= Kalavad taluka =

Kalavad is a Taluka of Jamnagar district, located in Saurashtra region of Gujarat, India. Its headquarters is located in city of Kalavad. Kalavad is largest and second most populous taluka of the Jamnagar district. Kalvad Taluka is surrounded by Jam Kandorna Taluka to the south, Lodhika Taluka to the east, Paddhari Taluka to the northeast and Dhrol Taluka to the north.

Kalavad Taluka consists of 125 villages and 97 Gram Panchayats. Kharedi is the most populous village and Mevasa (Haripar) is the least populous village of Kalavad Taluka. Mota Vadala is the biggest village in the Taluka with an area of 39 square kilometres (15 sq mi) and Mevasa (Haripar) is the smallest with 2 square kilometres (0.77 sq mi).

There is only one city in the Taluka that comes under the Taluka administration which is Kalavad Municipality.

Kalavad Taluka represents Kalavad Vidhan Sabha constituency in Gujarat legislative assembly, Pravin Musadia is a member of the legislative assembly to represent Kalavad constituency.

== Demographics ==
According to the 2011 census Kalavad census district has a population of around 1,11,415.

== Administration ==
Kalavad Taluka is administered by Kalavad Taluka Panchayat and Kalavad municipality administers headquarters Kalavad city.

== Famous temples ==
- Shitla Mataji Temple (Kalavad)
- Ramdev Pir Mandir (Nava Ranuja)
- Varudimata Mandir (Dhudasiya)
- Danidhar Mandir (Danidhar)
- Shiv Mandir (Laxmipur)
- Pragteshwar Mahadev (Mota Vadala)
- Fulnath Mahadev (dhun dhoraji)
