= Machhlivad =

- Village
- Location within Gujarat Location within India
- Coordinates: 22.180854°N 70.298923°E
- Country: India
- State: Gujarat
- District: Jamnagar
- Region: Saurashtra

Government
  - Type: Gram Panchayat
  - Body: Machhlivad Gram Panchayat
  - Sarpanch: Mr. Bhupat Singh Jadeja

Languages
  - Official: Gujarati, Sanskrit, English, Hindi
  - Spoken: Gujarati
- Time zone: UTC+5:30 (IST)
- Postal Index Number: 361 160
- Vehicle registration: GJ-10
- Website: Machhlivad

Machhlivad (also known as Machhaliwad, Machhalivad or Machalivad) is a medium-sized village and gram panchayat located in the Kalavad taluk of Jamnagar district, Gujarat, India.

It is 8 km (5.0 mi) from Kalavad and 51 km (32 mi) east of Jamnagar. Its postcode is 361160; its vill or location code is 513814. The nearest sizeable railway station is Rajkot Junction.

The total area of the village is 1808.46 hectares. The population in 2011 was 958 (484 males, 474 women) occupying 177 houses.
