= Nandpur =

- Village
- Location in Gujarat, India Nandpur (India)
- Coordinates: 22.406355°N 70.363014°E
- Country: India
- State: Gujarat
- District: Jamnagar

Population (2001)
  - Total: 1,600

Languages
  - Official: Gujarati, Hindi
- Time zone: UTC+5:30 (IST)
- Postal Index Number: 361130
- Vehicle registration: GJ
- Website: https://www.facebook.com/

Nandpur is a small village in Jamnagar, Gujarat, India. The road to it is from Kalavad to Ranuja, Dhutarpur, Bajrangpur, Vijaypur, Bharatpur Nandpur and from Dhrol to Falla, Ranjitpar, Jamwanthali, Nandpur. Most people there are farmers. Some of them are connected with animal husbandry.

== History ==
Nandpur Village was reestablished from old Locality named Virpur in 1982 due to the new construction of Und dem on the river of Und

== Statistics ==
- Population (approx): 1600
- Buildings (approx): 142
- Temples: 4
- Shops: 8
- Primary School: 1

== Co-ordinates ==
Nandpur Village Is Located At 22.406355°N 70.363014°E On Globe.
