= Harilal Upadhyay =

Gujarati author (1916–1994)

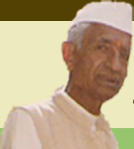
- Born: 22 January 1916; Mota Khijadiya, Bombay Presidency, India
- Died: 15 January 1994 (aged 77); Paddhari, Gujarat, India
- Other names: Haribhai Kavi, Sanyasi
- Occupations: Novelist, poet and astrologer
- Website: www.harilalupadhyay.com

Harilal Upadhyay was a Gujarati novelist and poet. He wrote more than 100 books.

== Life ==
Harilal Upadhyay was born on 22 January 1916 in Mota Khijadiya village near Rajkot in a family of Jadavji and Gangaben. His father was a priest in a temple at Makaji Meghpar. He completed his primary education from Paddhari while living with his father's elder brother Bhavanishankar and sister Dayakunwarben. He moved to Jamnagar and studied in Sanskrit Pathshala where he mastered in traditional rituals and texts under Trambakram Shastri.

He started writing poetry during his stay in Jamnagar. At the age of 13, he recited a poem in public. His first short story, "Hridaypalto", was published in Modhbandhu magazine at the age of 15, and another story was published in Beghadi Moj. He was connected with traditional bards and folk stories during this period. He was influenced by the bard Krishnada. He returned to Makaji Meghpar but he was not interested in priesthood. His uncle Bhavanishankar was also a traditional story teller and musician who used to go to different princely states for performance in royal courts. He went with him to different places and started taking notes on folk stories, incidents and folk songs. He also learned poetry presentation from him. He met Vajubhai Shulka, an Indian independence activist from Rajkot. He studied politics there and also wrote a 500 stanza long poem, "Tanya". Vajubhai brought "Tanya" to Bombay. After reading it, Harilal was invited to Bombay by Amritlal Sheth, journalist and the founder of Janmabhoomi newspaper.

He moved to Bombay and published his first short story collection, Jeevanchhaya, on the insistence of K. M. Munshi. He later moved to Paddhari and continued to write from there.

He died on 15 January 1994 in Paddhari, Gujarat, India.

== Works ==
Historical novels

He wrote a large number of historical novels. His Mewad or Suryavansh/Rajasthan historical novel series include Mevad Ni Tejchhaya, Mevad Na Maharathi : NariRatna PannaDai, Chittod Ni Rangarjana : RoopRani Padmini, Mevad No Kesri, ShauryaPratapi Maharana Pratap. Deshgaurav Bhamashah, and Jay Chittod. His Chandravansh/Gujarat historical novel series include ShauryaPratapi Chandravansh, Rudhir Nu Rajtilak, Lakho Fulani, Ranmedan, Ek Bhalo Saput, Tati Talvar, Navanagar Na Narbanka, Managal Fera, Rajsatta Na Rang, Nayan Ughadyu Ne Phool Kharyu, KachchhBhoomi Na Kesri, and Padata Gadh Na Padchhaya (Part 1 and 2). His books on Modh Brahmins are Otrada Vayara Utho Utho and Sonavarani (the history of Modh Brahmins). His social novels set in historical background are Kalank Ane Kirtirekha, Vijay Vardaan, Bhagya devata, Roshani, and Aparajita.

He wrote seven book series on Indian epic Mahabharata which include Bhishma Pratigna, Dharma Pratigna, Kurukshetra, Bhishma No Shantibodh, Dharma Vijay, Mahaprasthaan and Yog Viyog.

Social novels

- Ramkali (RoopMangala)
- Rahi Gai Man Ni Man Ma
- Gauri
- Tan Bhukhya Koi Dhan Bhukhya
- Preete Parovaya
- Dharati Lal Gulal
- Nathi Sukaya Neer
- Sukh Savaya Thay
- Kundan Chadyu Kante
- Savazada Senjal Pie
- Man Dubya Mrugjal Ma
- KesarBhino Kanth
- Varso Re Ur na Amee
- AmrutBhini Ankhaladi
- Tej Chhavai Raat
- Haiye Madhaya Het
- Nisha Sunave Naad
- Alka
- ManPankhi Na Mala
- Kanchan Lage Na Kaat
- Antar Khole Ankh
- Nari Hati Ek Namani
- Paras Sparshe Ek J War
- Ugyo Chandra Amase
- Dhabakatu Dhan
- Rajpur Ni Lachhu
- Van Man Khili Vasant
- Gori To Gunial Bhali
- Dharm Ane Rajkaran
- Andhkaar Chhaya
- Saheli
- Sukhlalsa
- Man Ne Lagi Maya
- Pagla Padya Kankuvarna
- Chhanydee
- Roshnee

Short story collections

- Saurashtra No Vartaras
- Saurashtra Ni Rasgatha (2 parts)
- Saurashtra Ni Veergathao (5 parts)
- Sorthi Lokvato
- Jeevanchhaya
- PushpMangal (BaalVartao – kids' literature)

Biographies

- Harsiddhi Ane Hinglaj
- Sant Dada Mekan
- Sant Dharamshi Bhagat
- Mast Avdhoot Moondiya Swami
- Naag Mahima
- Chhelnami Saurashtra
- Karma Prabhaav
- ShaktiParichay (about Mahadevi Hinglajmata, Mahadevi Harsiddhi and Mahadevi Khodiyar)

Children's literature

- Pushpamangal

Play

- Najar Samena Shamana (Dreams in Front of the Eyes)

== Recognition ==
- Jyotirvigyan Sanshodhan Award
- Kanaiyalal Munshi Award

== See also ==
- List of Indian writers
