= Balambha =

Village in Jodiya taluka of Jamnagar District of Gujarat in India

Coordinates: 22.739°N 70.422°E

Balambha is a village in Jodiya taluka of Jamnagar District of Gujarat in India. The taluka headquarters of Jodiya is at a distance of 20 km and Jamnagar city at a distance of 60 km. The Dadhiari Dam on Aji river is at a distance of only 1 km. After [26 January 2001] earthquake Balambha village peoples live in three different parts of village 1) old balambha, 2) Shanti Nagar and 3) Binadhar.

== History ==
Balambha has a strong inner citadel. This is said in the Tarikh-i-Sorath by Ranchhodji Diwan to have been built by Rao Deshalji I of Cutch State in 1714, but its construction is popularly ascribed to Meraman Khavas. Probably the Rao first built a small citadel in 1714, afterward strengthened and enlarged by Meraman Khavas in 1784.

The river Aji, which flows by Rajkot, falls into the Little Rann of Kutch about six miles from Balambha. There is a hillock in the lands of Balambha called Bina where there is a Chapter spring of fresh water called the Navghan Kui. It is said that when Ra Navghan of Junagadh was marching to Cutch to avenge Jaasal, he halted here and was athirst and the men that were with him. In his distress he called on his tutelary goddess to aid him. She directed him to plunge his spear into the hillock; he did so and water flowed forth and he appeased his thirst and that of his army.

In the rains of 1881, Balambha was at the centre of the cyclone which visited the north-west of the peninsula; forty-five inches of rain fell in the three days the cyclone lasted, hundreds of mud-houses were washed down, and it is said that only forty houses in the whole town were uninjured. This storm did much damage, and many cattle died from the damp and exposure.

== Education ==
The village has a aanganvadi pre primary school, a government primary school, and a government secondary and higher secondary school.

== Demographics ==
The population is of Gurjar Kshatriya Kadia, Sathvara, Lohana, Bharvad, Brahmin, Koli, Khoja, Muslim, etc.
