= Krushnanagar =

Village in Gujarat, India

Coordinates: 22.7432738°N 70.5873041°E

Krushnanagar is a village in Jodiya taluka of Jamnagar District of Gujarat in India. The village has a Government School.
