= Navagam Kalavad =

Navagam Kalavad નવાગામ કાલાવડ
- Location in Gujarat, India
- Coordinates: 22.062°N 70.305°E
- Country: India
- State: Gujarat
- District: Jamnagar district
- Tehsil: Kalavad

Population (2011)
  - Total: 2,272

Language
  - Official: Gujarati
- Time zone: UTC+5:30 (IST)

Navagam Kalavad is a village in Kalavad tehsil of Jamnagar district of Gujarat state of India. The 2011 Census of India counted 2,272 local inhabitants.

== See also ==
- Kalavad
- Jamnagar district
