= Bhimkata =

Village in Jodiya Taluka of Jamnagar district, Gujarat, India

Coordinates: 22°48′N 70°28′E

Bhimkata is a village in Jodiya Taluka of Jamnagar district, Gujarat, India.

It is situated near Balambha, about ten miles from the Gulf of Kutch. The soil of the surrounding country is salt. There is a water tank called the Megasri in the village provides drinking water which is also shared by the neighbouring village of Dudhai. It holds water for three months in the year.

The water being brackish, no garden crops can be raised. It was held by Gaekwad of Baroda State during British period.
