= Makaji Meghpar =

- Village
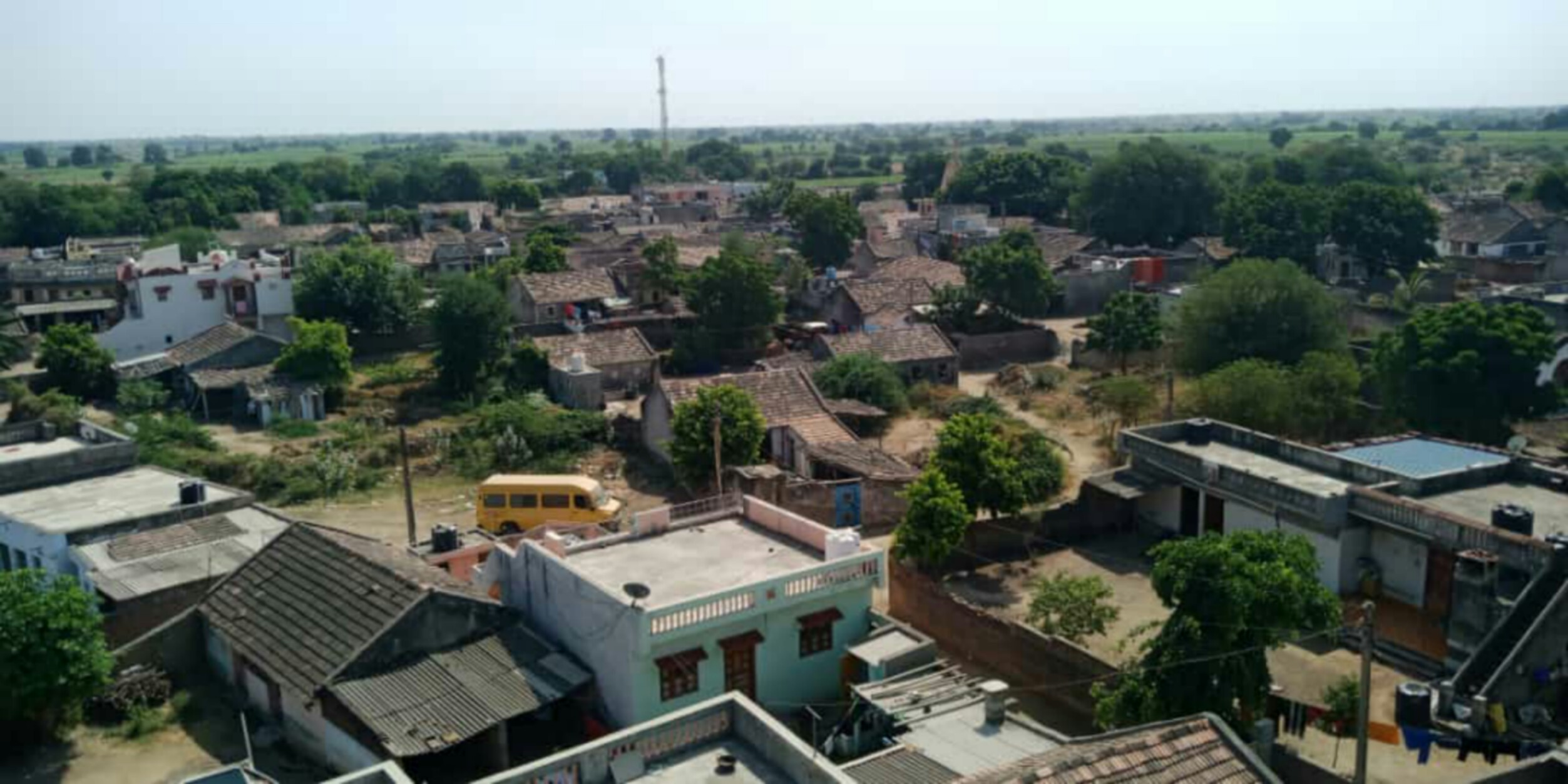
- Nicknames: Makaji Bapu na Meghpar; Meghana
- Location in state Makaji Meghpar (India)
- Coordinates: 22.3346389°N 70.4866111°E
- Country: India
- State: Gujarat
- Region: Saurashtra
- District: Jamnagar
- Taluka: Kalavad
- Makaji Bapu Na Meghpar: 1754
- Founder: Makanji Ketoji Jadeja of Dhrol State
- Named for: Makanji Jadeja

Government
  - Type: Gram Panchayat
  - Body: Makaji Meghpar Gram Panchayat
  - Sarpanch: Alabhai Gamara
  - Upsarpanch: B M Jadeja

Area
  - Total: 23.44 km^{2} (9.05 sq mi)
  - Rank: 10th
- Elevation: 53 m (174 ft)

Population (2011)
  - Total: 1,942
  - Rank: 11th
  - Density: 82.85/km^{2} (214.6/sq mi)
- Time zone: UTC+5:30 (IST)
- Postal Index Number: 360 110
- Telephone code: +91 02894
- Vehicle registration: GJ · 10
- Gender ratio: ♂1000 : 976♀
- Literacy: 74.45% (2011)
- Driving side: Left
- Avg. Temperature: 27 °C (81 °F)

Makaji Meghpar (/ˈməkɑːdʒiː meɪɡhpər/) (also known as Meghana) is a village in the Jamnagar district of Gujarat, India. Located in the Saurashtra region, it served historically as a chiefdom under the Hardhrol Jadeja chieftains. Established in 1754 by Makanji Ketoji Jadeja of Dhrol State, the village bears his name and legacy. Notably, the celebrated Gujarati writer Harilal Upadhyay hailed from Makaji Meghpar. Its population is predominantly composed of Jadeja Rajputs, alongside Brahmins, Patels, and Dalits

== History ==
Historic flag of Makaji Meghpar Jagir.

Founded in 1754 by Makanji Jadeja, Makaji Meghpar became the administrative center—or jagir—of his chiefdom. This status continued until India's independence, during which time it fell under the jurisdiction of the Nawanagar State

== Census ==
Makaji Meghpar is a medium size village located in Kalavad of Jamnagar district, with total 383 families residing. The Makaji Meghpar village has population of 1942 of which 983 are males while 959 are females as per Population Census 2011.

In Makaji Meghpar village population of children with age 0-6 is 259 which makes up 13.34% of total population of village. Average Sex Ratio of Makaji Meghpar village is 976 which is higher than Gujarat state average of 919. Child Sex Ratio for the Makaji Meghpar as per census is 837, lower than Gujarat average of 890. Makaji Meghpar village has lower literacy rate compared to Gujarat. In 2011, literacy rate of Makaji Meghpar village was 74.45% compared to 78.03% of Gujarat. In Makaji Meghpar Male literacy stands at 80.88% while female literacy rate was 68.01%.

=== Work Profile ===
In Makaji Meghpar village out of total population, 729 were engaged in work activities. 87.38% of workers describe their work as Main Work, while 12.62% were involved in Marginal activity providing livelihood for less than 6 months. Of 729 workers engaged in Main Work, 448 were cultivators while 116 were Agricultural labourer.

=== Data table ===
Particular	Total	Male ♂	Female ♀
Population	1,942	983	959
Child (0–6)	259	141	118
Schedule Caste	424	229	195
Literacy	74.45 %	80.88 %	68.01 %
Total Workers	729	593	136

=== Castes ===
Caste in Makaji Meghpar (by 2011)
1. Forward Castes (52.4%)
2. SEBC (25.8%)
3. Schedule Caste (21.8%)

Schedule Caste (SC) constitutes 21.83% and Socially and Educationally Backward Caste constitutes 25.75% of total population in Makaji Meghpar village. The village Makaji Meghpar currently doesn't have any Schedule Tribe (ST) population. Forward Castes (Rajputs, Brahmins and Patels) constitutes 52.42% of the population of Makaji Meghpar.

== Economy ==
Agriculture is the cornerstone of Makaji Meghpar's economy. The majority of the village's inhabitants are engaged in farming, cultivating crops such as groundnuts, millet (bajra), cotton, and wheat

== Administration ==
The village is governed by the Makaji Meghpar Gram Panchayat, which comprises eight wards. Each ward elects a representative, and the panchayat is headed by a Sarpanch, assisted by an Up-Sarpanch. As of the latest information, Alabhai M. Gamara serves as the Sarpanch, with B. M. Jadeja as the Up-Sarpanch; the panchayat secretary is Parakramsinh Jadeja.

== Geography ==
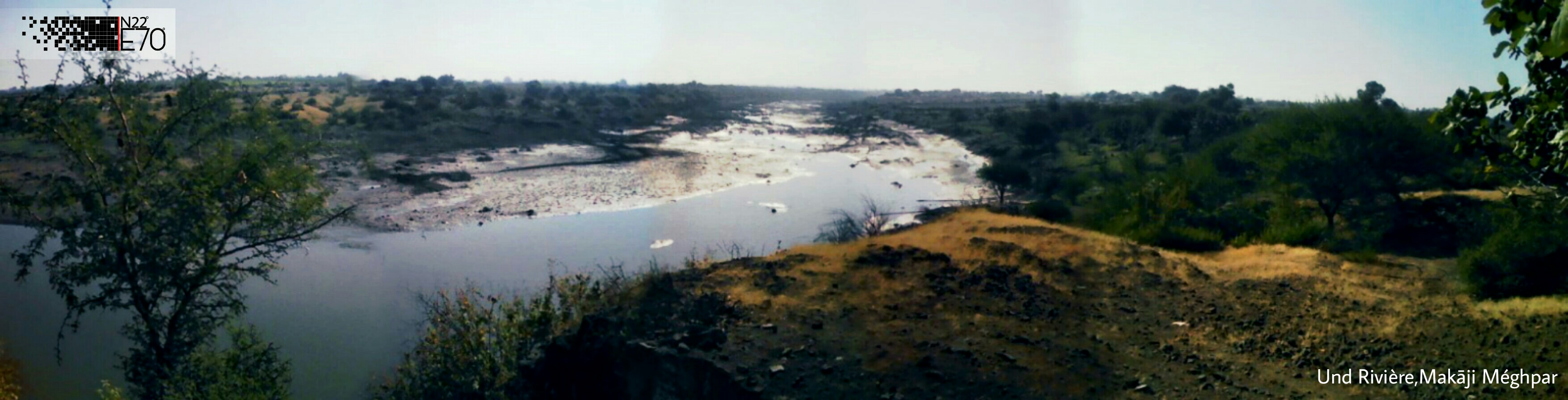
Und river at Makaji Meghpar

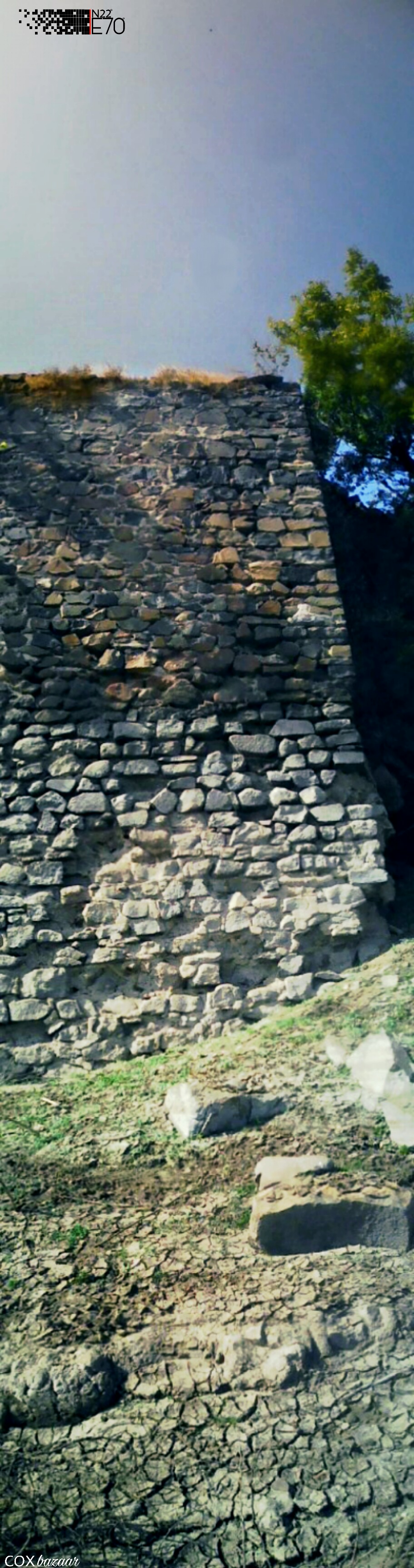
Kohh no Jodd, The construction about Old native irrigation systems on Und river

Situated at approximately 22.33°N latitude and 70.48°E longitude, Makaji Meghpar lies at an average elevation of 53 meters (174 feet) above sea level. The village spans an area of 23.44 km^{2} and is located along the banks of the Domdi and Und rivers. It also serves as the administrative center for the Makaji Meghpar Rural Complex, which includes the neighboring hamlets of Shivnagar and Mangalpur

== Demographics ==
Gujarati is the primary language spoken in Makaji Meghpar, reflecting the village's strong regional identity. The entire population practices Hinduism, and religious life plays a central role in community life. The village is dotted with temples dedicated to deities such as Aashapura Mata, Vaidyanath Mahadev, Hanuman, and Shakti Mata. In addition, there are several devdis (small shrines) honoring folk deities like Meladi Mata, Ramdeoji, Machchho Mata, Khetaliya Naag, and Sarmariya Naag, which are integral to local traditions and beliefs. Alongside its spiritual practices, the village fosters an active sporting culture. Cricket is the most popular game, while traditional sports such as Kabaddi and Kho-Kho are also commonly played, especially among the youth.

== Connectivity ==
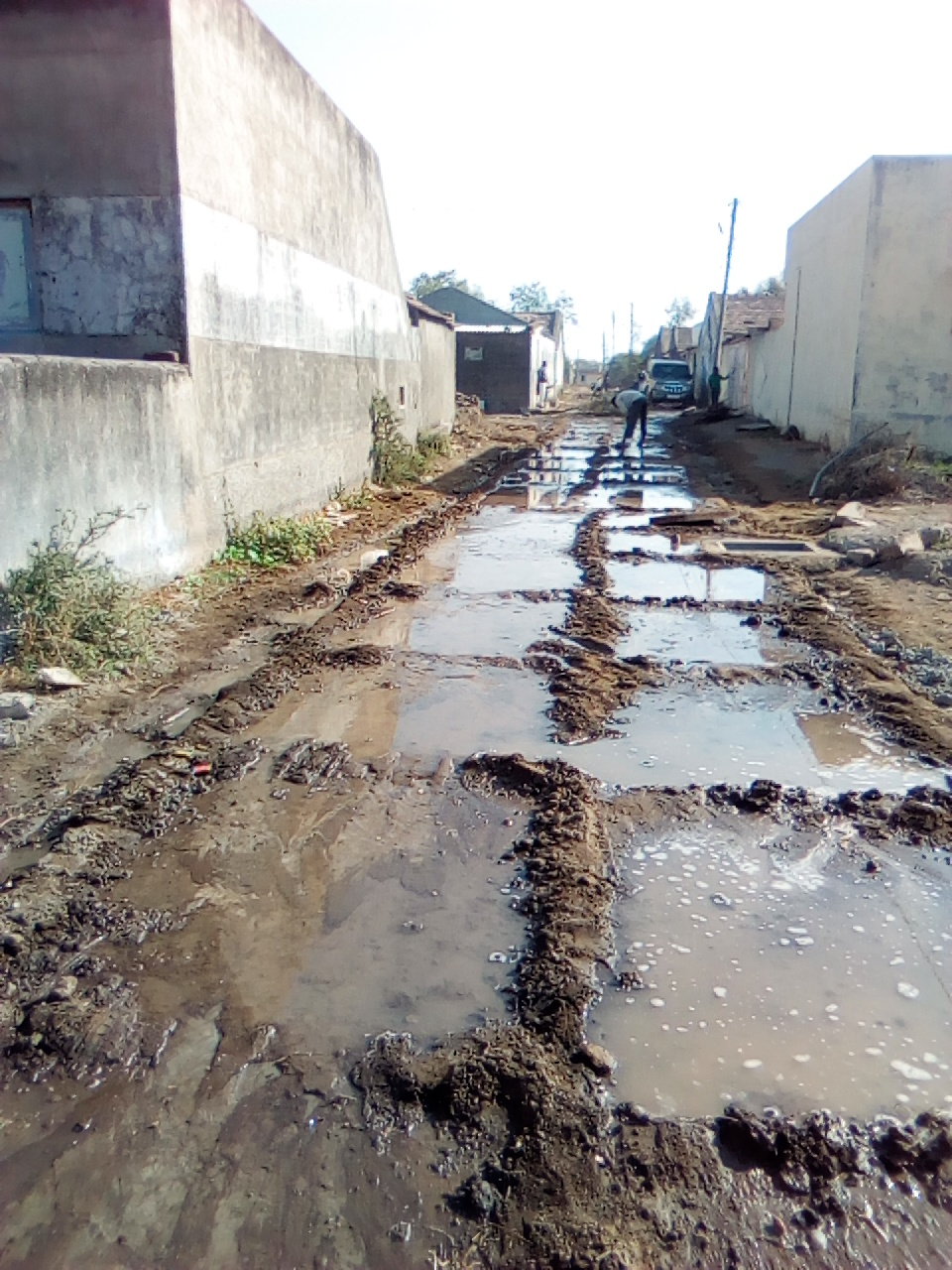
RCC Road being constructed in Makaji Meghpar

Makaji Meghpar connects to nearby hubs—Paddhari, Kalavad, and adjacent villages—via single-lane paved roads. The Rajkot International Airport is the nearest air travel facility, while Hadmatiya Junction and Paddhari serve as the closest railheads.
