= Motibanugar =

Motibanugar is a village in Jamnagar Taluka, Jamnagar district, Gujarat,situated on Jamnagar Rajkot highway, 18 km away from Jamnagar in India. The village has a population of around 4500.

== Religion ==
The village has main four temples of god and goddess:

- Ma Kumarika
- Great Hanumanji
- Mahadevji and Surapura bapa
- Khimabapa (SHAPARIA FAMILY)

== Education and economy ==
There are three primary schools in village

- government primary school,
- Akshardeep vidyalay,
- Shreyas vidyalay.

Secondary and higher secondary schools are also in the village.

The main occupation of the people is agriculture and other subsidiary depends on the same. More than 70% of villagers are educated. People are dispersed in all the fields like agriculture, Revenue, defense, teaching, politics, IT and many more. Few people are businessman, government workers, and professional too.
