= Jhilariya =

- Village
- Location in Saurashtra, India Jhilariya (India)
- Coordinates: 22°37′N 70°53′E
- Country: India
- State: Gujarat
- District: Rajkot
- Taluka: Paddhari

Government
  - Type: Gram Panchayat
  - Body: Jhilariya Gram Panchayat
  - Sarpanch: ?

Population (2011)
  - Total: 1,719

Languages
  - Official: Gujarati
- Time zone: UTC+5:30 (IST)
- Postal code: 360110
- Vehicle registration: GJ·03

Jhilariya is a village in Rajkot district in the Indian state of Gujarat. It is located near Makaji Meghpar.

== Administration ==
Jhilariya Gram Panchayat is the local self-government of the village. The panchayat has a total of 10 wards and each ward is represented by an elected ward member. The ward members are headed by a sarpanch.
