= Meghji Chavda =

Indian politician

Meghjibhai Chavda (born 1958) is an Indian politician from Gujarat. He is a member of the Gujarat Legislative Assembly from Kalavad Assembly constituency, which is reserved for Scheduled Caste community, in Jamnagar district. He won the 2022 Gujarat Legislative Assembly election representing the Bharatiya Janata Party.

== Early life and education ==
Chavda is from Kalavad, Jamnagar district, Gujarat. He is the son of Amrabhai Parbatbhai Chavda. He is a commerce graduate. His wife is in business and runs a studio.

== Career ==
Chavda won from Kalavad Assembly constituency representing the Bharatiya Janata Party in the 2022 Gujarat Legislative Assembly election. He polled 59,292 votes and defeated his nearest rival, Jignesh Solanki of the Aam Aadmi Party, by a margin of 15,850 votes. He first became an MLA winning the 2012 Gujarat Legislative Assembly election, also on the BJP ticket, defeating Dinesh Parmar of the Indian National Congress, by a margin of 6,119 votes.
