= Hadmatiya JN. =

- Village
- Nickname: Hadmatiya Morvāni
- Location within Gujarat Location within India
- Coordinates: 22.4320°N 70.4792°E
- Country: India
- State: Gujarat
- District: Jamnagar
- Region: Saurashtra

Government
  - Type: Gram Panchayat
  - Body: Hadmatiya Gram Panchayat
- Demonym: Hadmatian

Languages
  - Official: Gujarati, Sanskrit, English, Hindi
  - Spoken: Gujarati
- Time zone: UTC+5:30 (IST)
- Postal Index Number: 360 XXX
- Vehicle registration: GJ-XX
- Website: gujaratindia.com

Hadmatiya (JN) is a village in Rajkot District, Gujarat, India.
