= Kanavadala =

- Village
- Country: India
- State: Gujarat
- District: Rajkot
- Block/Tehsil: Jamkandorna

Area
  - Total: 112.3142 km^{2} (43.3648 sq mi)

Population
  - Total: 13,210 (2,460 households)
  - Density: 117.6/km^{2} (304.6/sq mi)
- Time zone: UTC+05:30 (IST)
- Vehicle registration: GJ 3

Kanavadala is a village located in Jamkandorna Tehsil of Rajkot district in Gujarat, India. It's situated 17 km away from the sub-district headquarters in Jamkandorna and 20 km. away from the district headquarters in Rajkot. As per the 2009 statistics, Kanavadala village is itself a gram Panchayat. According to the 2011 Census, the location code/village code of Kanavadala village is 513276.

The total geographical area of village is 1130.56 hectares. Kanavadala has a total population of 1,321 people and there are about 246 houses in Kanavadala village. and Kanavadala Village Sarpanch Chintan Hareshbhai Varsani Kalavad, approximately 28 km. away, is the nearest town to Kanavadala.

== Demographics ==
Total Population	Male Population	Female Population
13210	6740	6470

== Village Overview ==
Gram Panchayat	Kanavadala
Sarpanch	CHINTAN HARESHBBHAI VARSANI
Block / Tehsil	Jamkandorna
District	Rajkot
State	Gujarat
Pincode	360405
Area	1131.42 hectares
Households	2460
Nearest Town	Jamkandorna ( 17 km) and Rajkot
Schools	Shri Kanavadala Primary School
Temple	Varsani Family Kuldevi Shree Khodiyar Mataji Ram Mandir, Mahadev Mandir
