= Mota Vadala =

- Village
- Location in state Mota Vadala (India)
- Coordinates: 22.207988°N 70.37746°E
- Country: India
- State: Gujarat
- Region: Saurashtra
- District: Jamnagar
- Taluka: Kalavad

Government
  - Type: Gram Panchayat
  - Body: Mota Vadala Gram Panchayat

Area
  - Total: 39.3 km^{2} (15.2 sq mi)
  - Rank: 1st
- Elevation: 52 m (171 ft)

Population (2011)
  - Total: 4,129
  - Rank: 3rd
  - Density: 105/km^{2} (272/sq mi)
- Time zone: UTC+5:30 (IST)
- Postal Index Number: 361162
- Telephone code: +91 02894
- Vehicle registration: GJ · 10
- Gender ratio: ♂1000 : 930♀
- Literacy: 73.92% (2011)
- Driving side: Left
- Avg. Temperature: 26 °C (79 °F)

Mota Vadala is a village located in Jamnagar District of Gujarat. The village has 902 families and a population of 4129 of which 2139 are males and 1990 are females as per Indian Population Census 2011.

Mota Vadala has governmental facilities like hospital, school, panchayat, dairy, etc. It is located 5 km in-land from Rajkot-Kalavad state highway.

== Demographics ==
The Mota Vadala village is the third most populous village in Kalavad Taluka,. As of the 2011 Population Census, the population is 4,129, of which 2,139 are males while 1,990 are females. Hinduism, Islam and Jainism are major religions in Mota Vadala.

8.43%, or 348, of the village are aged 0 to 6. The average sex ratio of Mota Vadala village is 930, which is higher than Gujarat state average of 919. Child sex ratio for Mota Vadala as per census is 794, lower than Gujarat average of 890.

Mota Vadala village has lower literacy rate compared to Gujarat. In 2011, literacy rate of Mota Vadala village was 73.92% compared to 78.03% of Gujarat. In Mota Vadala, male literacy stands at 81.39% while female literacy rate was 66.01%.

=== Caste factor ===
Schedule Caste (SC) constitutes 4.00% while Schedule Tribe (ST) were 2.30% of total population in Mota Vadala village.

=== Work profile ===
In Mota Vadala village out of total population, 2,220 were engaged in work activities. 70.68% of workers describe their work as Main Work (employment or earning more than six months) while 29.32% were involved in Marginal activity providing livelihood for less than six months. Of the 2,220 workers engaged in Main Work, 868 were cultivators (owner or co-owner) while 144 were agricultural labourer.

== Economy ==
The main occupation of the people of Mota Vadala village is agriculture, farming, animal husbandry and diamond industry. In this village, mainly wheat, cumin, groundnut, sesame seeds, millet, chickpea, cotton, Deewela, Rajaka and other vegetables are harvested.
