= Keshiya =

Coordinates: 22°40′11″N 70°23′41″E

Keshiya is a large village located in the Jodiya sub division of Jamnagar district, Gujarat, India. The Village is located approximately 10 km from taluka headquarter Jodiya, 18 km from Dhrol City and 57 km from district headquarter Jamnagar. Keshiya Village has peaceful and clean atmosphere.

Keshiya Village Photo

== History ==
location of village

== Geography ==
Signboard at lakhtar village showing keshiya Village name

== Education ==
Keshiya village has many educational institutions which involves government, government aided and private. Various names of schools are listed below

1). Shri Keshiya Taluka shala This government primary school has education system upto 8th class.

2). Shri Keshiya Gram Panchayat highschool This Granted highschool governed by keshiya Gram Panchayat and education upto has secondary school ( 9th & 10th classes)

3). Shri Vivekananda vidya Mandir This is private primary school governed by Shri Atmiya education trust.

== Development ==
Recently in 2026 government department initiated process of building new Gram Panchayat Bhawan and Gram Panchayat highschool.Also government is repairing the old lake of keshiya Village.
