= Dhandhar River =

Dhandhar River is a river near Lalpur, Jamnagar district of Gujarat, India.

== Geology ==
Dhandhar River is a monsoon river that has water only in the Monsoon season. It has a very less quantity of water in winters while the volume of water increases in the summer season. It flows nearby from Jamnagar's city Lalpur.

== Bridge ==
Dhandhar River has a bridge in City Lalpur, which is built by Government. It connects Lalpur City to the Temple.

=== Tragic accident ===
Once in past, one GSRTC bus wants to pass from this bridge while raining. But due to water over-flowing, buses go away with water. Most passengers of the people died. Help comes to save them, but all goes in vain. All passengers died due to drowning.

== Use of water ==
Each drop of water should be used, where there is a shortage of water. Here water shortage happened in every year. In this river, there is no water in summer. But in winter and monsoon, there is some water. And in monsoon, sometimes, there is over-flow of water. So people around the river drain water from the river and use it for agriculture use and personal use also.
