= Rangmati River =

Coordinates: 22°30′N 70°05′E

Rangmati

Location
- Country: India
- State: Gujarat

Physical characteristics
- Source
  - location: India
- Mouth
  - location: Arabian Sea, India
- Length: 50 km (31 mi)
- Discharge
  - location: Arabian Sea

Rangmati River is a river in western India in Gujarat whose origin is near Rampar. Its basin has a maximum length of 50 km. The total catchment area of the basin is 518 km2. The city of Jamnagar lies on the banks of this river.

Rangmati Water Resources Project is built on this river.
