= Kalavad Assembly constituency =

Legislative Assembly constituency in Gujarat State, India

Coordinates: 22.21°N 70.38°E

Kalavad
- Constituency No. 76 for the Gujarat Legislative Assembly

Constituency details
- Country: India
- Region: Western India
- State: Gujarat
- District: Jamnagar
- Lok Sabha constituency: Jamnagar
- Total electors: 233,479
- Reservation: SC

Member of Legislative Assembly
- 15th Gujarat Legislative Assembly
- Incumbent Meghjibhai Amarabhai Chavda
- Party: Bharatiya Janata Party
- Elected year: 2022

Kalavad is one of the 182 Legislative Assembly constituencies of Gujarat state in India. It is part of Jamnagar district and is reserved for candidates belonging to the Scheduled Castes.

== List of segments ==
This assembly seat represents the following segments,

1. Kalavad Taluka
2. Jodiya Taluka (Part) Villages – Ranjitpar, Untbet-Shampar, Zinzuda, Rajpar, Fadsar, Bela, Rampar (Padabekad), Kothariya, Amran, Kharachiya, Kerali, Fatsar, Jivapar, Badanpar (Amran), Dhudkot, Mavnugam, Dudhai, Manamora, Bhimkata, Jamsar, Sampar, Ambala, Koyli, Padana, Jiragadh, Tarana, Madhapar, Balambha, Keshiya, Manpar, Morana, Meghpar, Jasapar, Bodka, Pithad, Gajdi, Rasnal, Timbdi.
3. Dhrol Taluka – Entire taluka except villages – Chhalla, Golita.
4. Paddhari Taluka (Part) of Rajkot District Villages – Khokhri, Jivapar.

== Members of the Legislative Assembly ==
Year	Member	Picture	Party
1980	Patel Bhimjibhai Vasrambhai		Independent politician
1985	Keshubhai Patel		Bharatiya Janata Party
1990	Patel Raghavji Hansraj		Bharatiya Janata Party
1995	Patel Raghavji Hansraj		Bharatiya Janata Party
1998	Ranchhodbhai Faldu		Bharatiya Janata Party
2002	Ranchhodbhai Faldu		Bharatiya Janata Party
2007	Ranchhodbhai Faldu		Bharatiya Janata Party
2012	Meghji Chavda		Bharatiya Janata Party
2017	Musadiya Pravinbhai Narashibhai		Indian National Congress
2022	Meghji Chavda		Bharatiya Janata Party

== Election results ==
=== 2022 ===
Gujarat Assembly election, 2022:Kalavad Assembly constituency
Party	Candidate	Votes	%	±%
BJP	Meghji Chavda	59292	45.22	
AAP	Dr. Jignesh Solanki	43442	33.13	
INC	Pravin Narashibhai Musadiya	24337	18.56	
NOTA	None of the above	2127	1.62	
Majority		15,850	12.09	
Turnout				
Registered electors		230,775		
BJP gain from INC		Swing		

=== 2017 ===
Gujarat Legislative Assembly Election, 2017: Kalavad
Party	Candidate	Votes	%	±%
INC	Musadiya Pravinbhai Narashibhai			
NOTA	None of the Above			
Majority				
Turnout				

=== 2012 ===
Gujarat Assembly Election, 2012
Party	Candidate	Votes	%	±%
BJP	Meghjibhai Chavda	49027	36.47	
INC	Dr. Dinesh Parmar	42908	31.92	
Majority		6119	4.55	
Turnout		134442	68.98	
BJP hold		Swing		

== See also ==
- List of constituencies of Gujarat Legislative Assembly
- Jamnagar district
