= Lalpur, Jamnagar district =

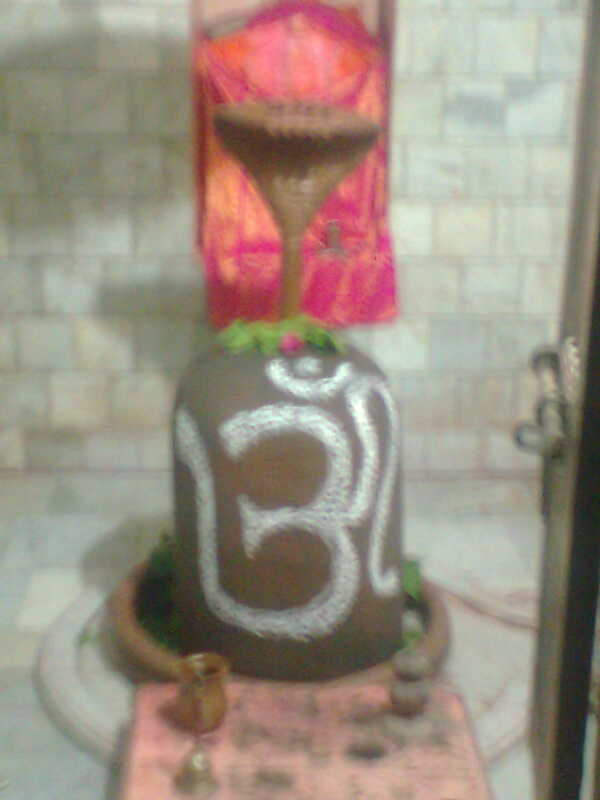
Bholeshwar Mahadev

Lalpur is a small town of Jamnagar district, Gujarat, India near the bank of the Dhandhar River.It is also tehsil itself. Lalpur has population of 17500 as per census of 2011. Lalpur is 30 km away from city Jamanagar and 123 km away from city Rajkot.
