= Nobat =

Indian newspaper

- Type: Daily (Evening)
- Format: Print, online
- Publisher: Madhwani Prakashan
- Political alignment: Centre-Right
- Language: Gujarati
- Headquarters: Gujarat
- City: Jamnagar, Gujarat
- Country: India
- Website: www.nobat.com

Nobat is a Gujarati language daily newspaper published in Jamnagar, Gujarat, India.
