= Pirotan =

Pirotan Lighthouse
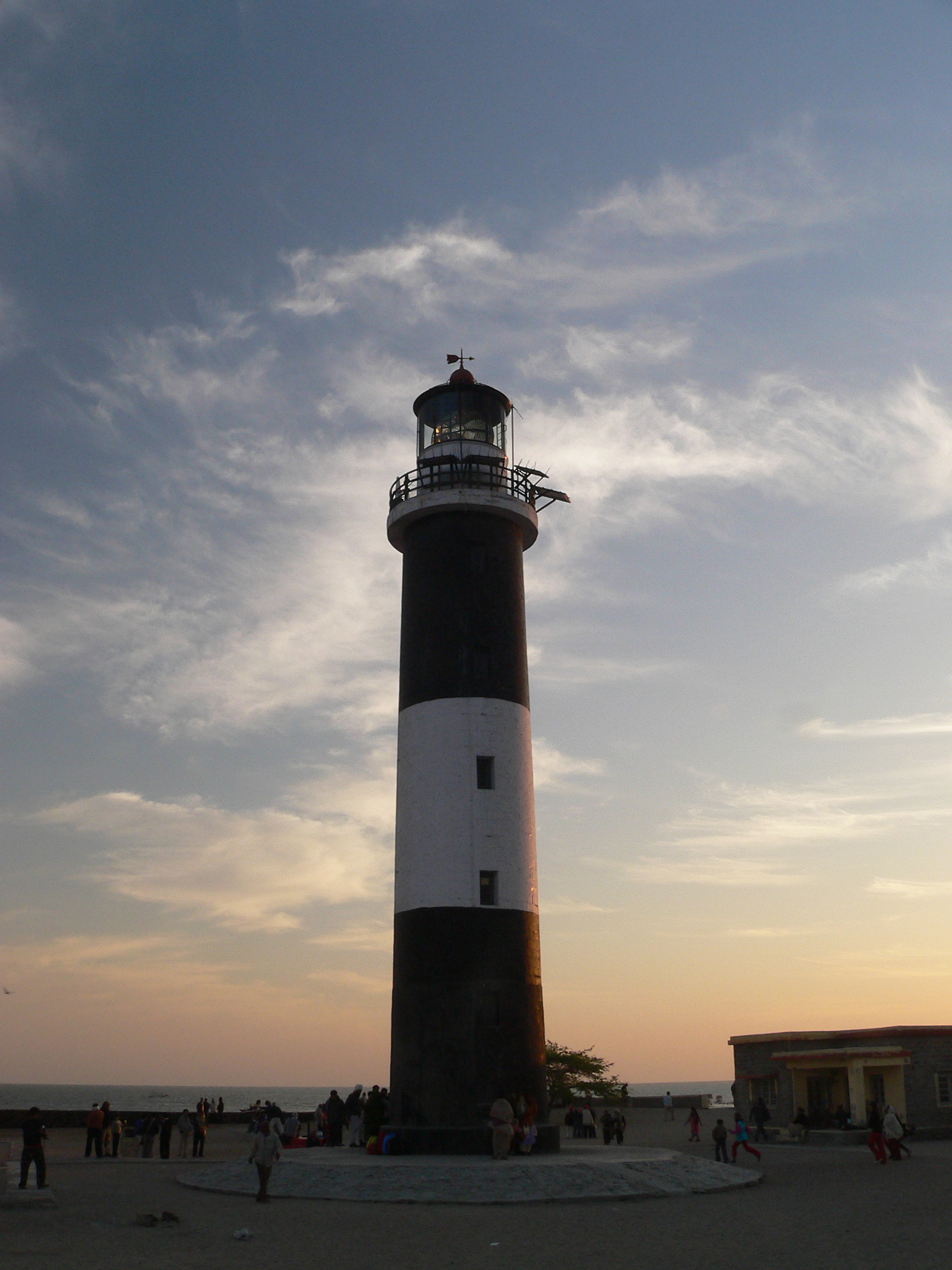
- Location: Pirotan, Jamnagar district, Gujarat, India
- Coordinates: 22°36′16″N 69°57′08″E

Tower
- Constructed: 1898 (first), 1958 (current)
- Construction: stone
- Height: 18 m (59 ft)
- Shape: cylindrical tower with balcony and lantern
- Markings: black (tower), white (stripe), red (dome)
- Racon: K

Light
- First lit: 1958
- Focal height: 26 m (85 ft)
- Range: 24 nmi (44 km; 28 mi)
- Characteristic: Fl W 20s

Pirotan Island (also known as Pirotan) is an island in the Marine National Park, Arabian Sea. It is located 12 nautical miles (22 km) off the coast (Bedi Port), Jamnagar District of Gujarat state, India. It consists of mangroves and low-tide beaches, and has an area of 3 square kilometres. Rozi island is located about 10 kilometres to the southeast.

Of the 42 islands in the park, Pirotan Island is the most popular. It is one of the two islands where visitors are normally permitted. Visitation is strictly limited; permission is required from the Forest Department, Customs Department and the Ports. The mangroves consist mainly of species of Rhizophora, Avicennia and Ceriops.

== History ==
The island derived its name from Pirotan Patan, the ancient city probably at the place of Bedi Bandar.

In 1867 a flagpole was placed at the Island's northern tip to aid in navigation. In 1898 it was replaced with a 21-metre masonry lighthouse, which in turn was replaced in 1955–57 with a 24-metre-high (79 ft) lighthouse tower. In 1996, the lighthouse power was converted from diesel generator to solar power. The diesel generators exist for backup generation.

The island along surrounding coral reefs covering an area of 3 square kilometres was notified as part of Marine National Park in 1982.

== Population ==
The only people there on the island are the forest guard, the lighthouse people and the Mujhavar (Server) at the Holy Saint Khwaja Khizer R.A. shrine (Durgah). The sacred shrine of Khwaja Khijer Rahmatullahialaih is located on the island.

Most visitors come in the morning with the high tide and leave by evening. Weekends in winters may bring more than 200–300 visitors.

== Visiting Pirotan ==
The island being protected marine park, several permissions are required for visiting. For Indian Nationals, permission from local Forest Department, Customs Department & Ports Department. Foreign nationals additionally require permission from the police office.

There is no routine ferry service to the island. One has to hire boats from the port. These boats take about 1.5 hours to reach the island. Since the beach is very shallow, the boats can only reach the island during high tide and leave the island during high tide.

== Fauna ==
=== Marine ===
Marine life-forms found include:

- Various types of Crabs
  - Neptune
  - Wolf
  - King crab
  - Hermit crabs
  - Ghost crabs
- Sea Scorpions
- Wiper- Isosceles
- Sea snakes
- Sea slugs
- Sea Horse
- Squid
- Sea Anemone
- Octopus
- Sea Worms
- sabella
- Mud Skipper
- Sea Bonellia
- Coaster Cather
- Sea Urchin

Plus there are Saw-scaled Vipers & Scorpions too

=== Sea-birds ===
- Pelicans
- Sea Gull
- Harring Gull
- Blackheaded Gull
- Crab Plover
- Different types of waders

== Gallery ==
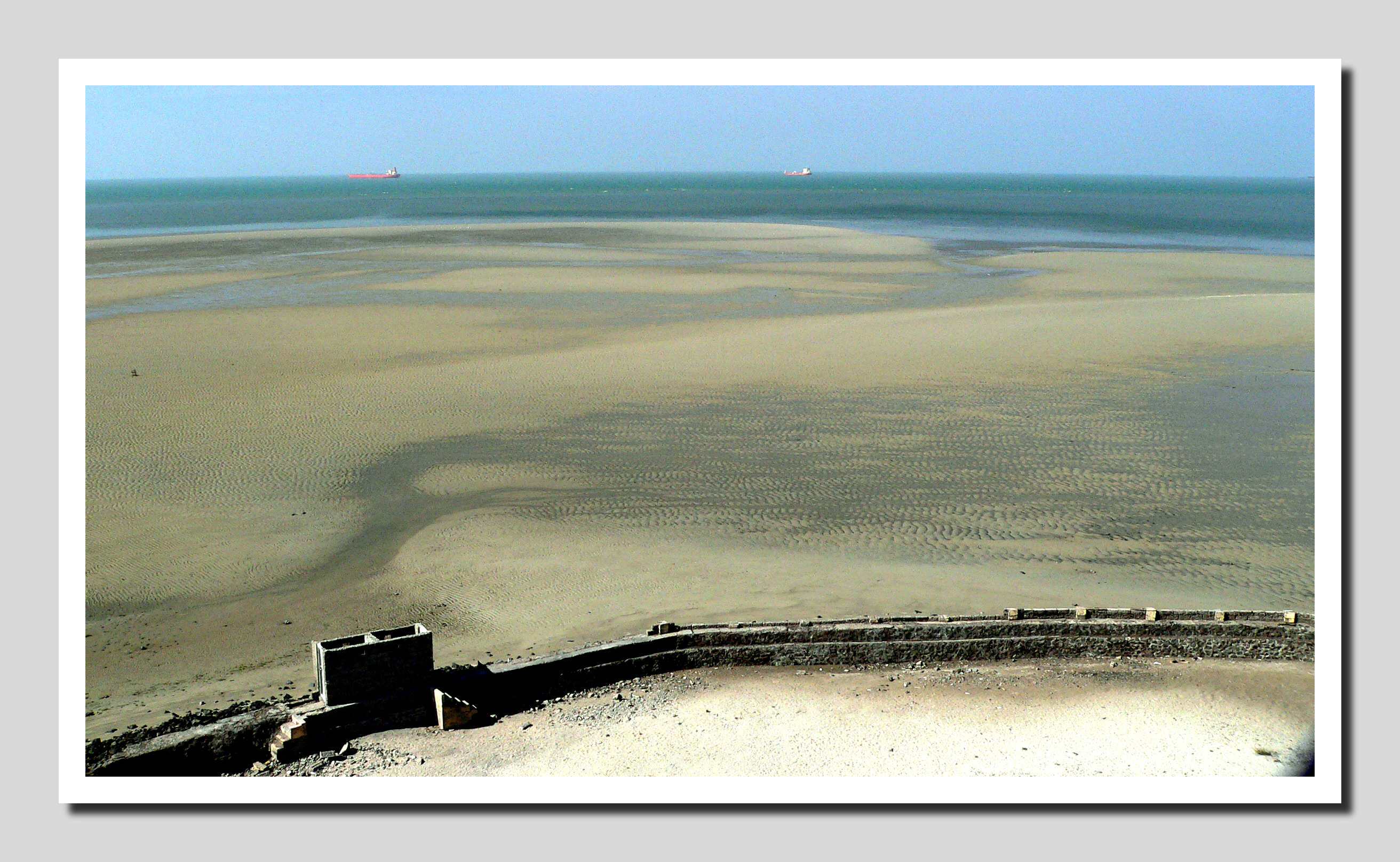
View of part of Pirotan island from the top of lighthouse

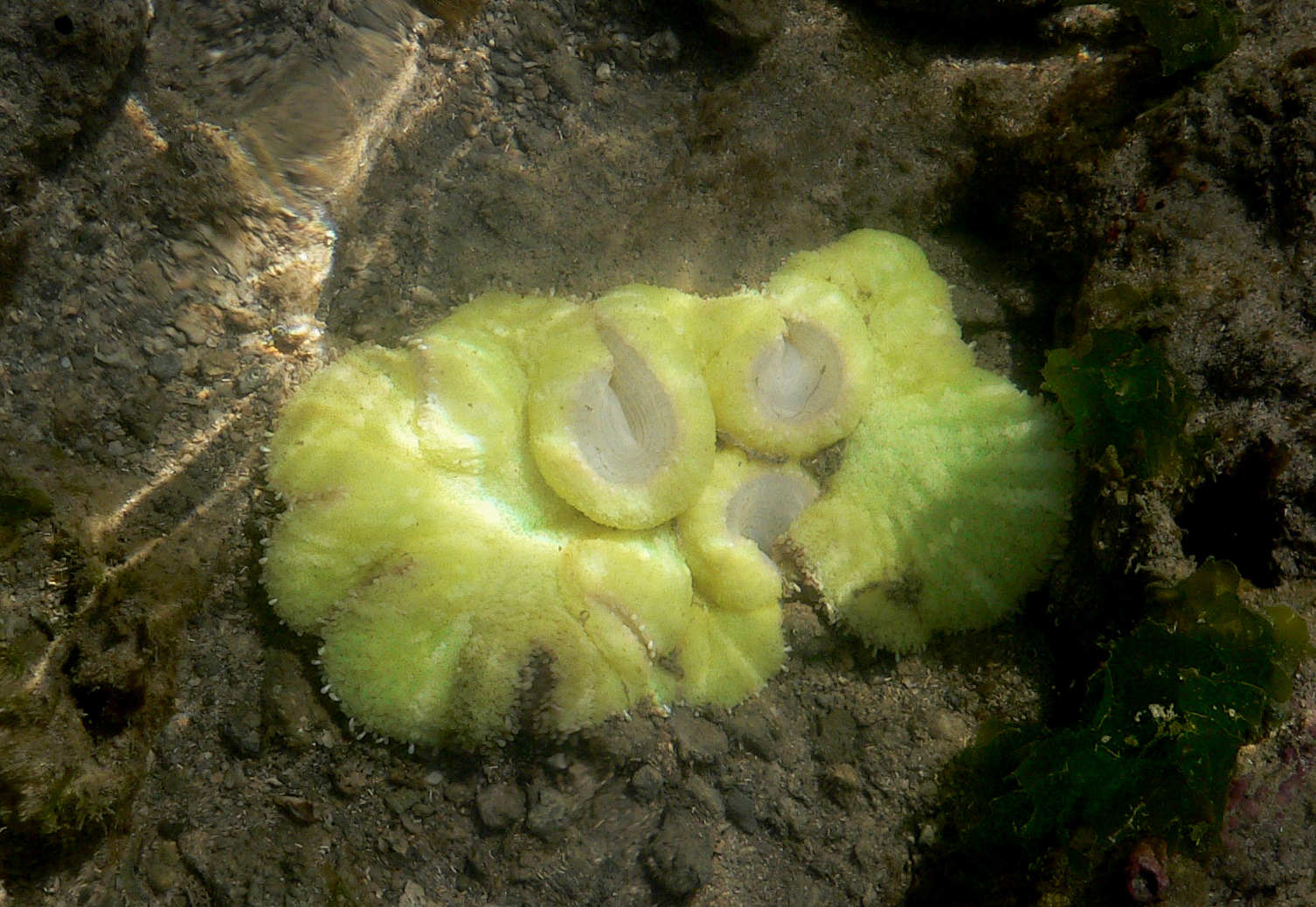
A beautiful fluorescent carpet anemone found on Pirotan Island
