= Jamnagar Municipal Corporation =

Local civic body in Jamnagar, Gujarat, India

Type
- Type: Municipal Corporation of Jamnagar

History
- Founded: 1981

Leadership
- Municipal Commissioner: D N Modi, IAS
- Mayor: TBA, Bharatiya Janata Party
- Deputy Mayor: TBA, BJP

Structure
- Seats: 64
- Political groups: Government (60): BJP (60); Opposition (4): INC (2); AAP (2)

Elections
- Last election: 2026
- Next election: 2031

Website
- mcjamnagar.com

Jamnagar Municipal Corporation is responsible for the civic infrastructure and administration of the city of Jamnagar in Gujarat state of India. The organization is known, in short, as JMC. It was established in 1981. This civic administrative body administers an area of 26.4 km^{2}. The Municipal commissioner of JMC is Shri D N Modi, IAS.

The governing structure of JMC consists of political and administrative wings. The political wing is an elected body of councilors headed by a mayor. The commissioner from the IAS cadre heads the administrative wing and is responsible for strategic and operational planning and management of the corporation. The commissioner takes decisions on behalf of the board or the standing committee formed from the elected councilors to perform the duties of the corporation.

Current Jamnagar city area population is 6.7 lakhs & district total population is 25.2 lakhs.

== History ==
- Jamnagar City Council was established on 30 Dec 1875 by the then Maharaja of Nawanagar.
- The revenue collection for the city council was started on 1 July 1902 to make the Body Financially Self Dependent.
- The City Council was axed and the Municipality of Jamnagar was established by the then Bombay State on 2 October 1949 as per Bombay Provincial Municipal Corporation Act 1949.
- The present Jamnagar Municipal Corporation was established on 6 October 1981 after Jamnagar was part of the state of Gujarat and since then all the administrative activities of the J.M.C. is conducted as per Bombay Provincial Municipal Corporation Act 1949.
- The Jamnagar Municipal Corporation has a governing urban area of about 26.40 square kilometres and an urban population of 6,68,000 in 2023.

== 2026 Election ==
2026 Jamnagar Municipal Corporation Election
#	Party	Seats
1.	Bharatiya Janata Party	60 ▲
2.	Indian National Congress	2 ▼
2.	others	2 ▼
Total		64

== Services ==
The Jamnagar Municipal Corporation is responsible for administering and providing basic infrastructure facilities to the city. The following are the major services provided by the Municipality:

- Water Purification and Supply
- Sewage treatment and Disposal
- Garbage disposal and Street Cleanliness
- Solid Waste Management
- Disaster Management
- Building and Maintenance of Roads, Streets and Flyovers.
- Street Lighting
- Maintenance of Parks, Gardens and Open Plots (Spaces)
- Cemeteries and Crematoriums
- Registering of Births and Deaths
- Conservation of Heritage Sites
- Disease control, including Immunization
- Maintaining (Public) Municipal managed schools.

=== City Civic Center ===
Jamnagar Municipal Corporation has started City Civic Center in different areas of city to get maximum advantage of the technology and give transparency in the day-to-day administration. JMC has four City Civic Centers, operational in different areas of Jamnagar Municipal Corporation for the urban resident citizens of Jamnagar. City Civic Center provides the following facilities:

- Collection and Assessment of Property Taxes
- Collection and Assessment of Water Charges
- Application for New Water Connection
- Complaint Redressal for the above, * Registration of Shop and Establishment
- Registration of Birth and Death Certificates
- Approvals for Construction of Buildings under Municipality Area
- Other Permissions and various Tax Collection.

For the Administrative purposes the city is divided 16 wards with each ward having 4 corporators totalling to 64 corporators with half of it reserved for women for the entire municipality who then elect Mayor and his deputy.

The Corporation is headed by a Municipal Commissioner, an IAS officer appointed by the government of Gujarat. He wields the executive power of the house. The mayor heads the party with the largest number of corporators elected. The mayor is responsible for the day-to-day running of the city services.

=== Environment Safety Initiative ===
- JMC Commissioner banned the usage of Polythene bags, plastic pouches all under 25 microns in Jamnagar promoting Green India, Clean India initiative.

=== Awards & Recognition ===
- In 2017, Computer Society of India, Kolkata gave CSI-Nihilent eGovernance Award to Jamnagar Municipal Corporation for Best eGovarnance Project of E-Governance: An Ushering into digital era for e-enablement of Citizens.
