= Jodia, Gujarat =

Town in Jamnagar district, Gujarat, India

Coordinates: 22.7000°N 70.3000°E

Jodia (also spelled Jodiya) is a town in Jamnagar district, Gujarat, India. Jodia was a well-known port of India before 1947. The activity of jodiya Port was at peak in 1980 era. Jodiya Port had railway connectivity till 1978.It has a sainik school located at Balachadi. It is the birthplace of Gunatitanand Swami. There is a clothes and a fish market. India's Second longest expressway Amritsar-Jamnagar economic corridor passing in this sub division.

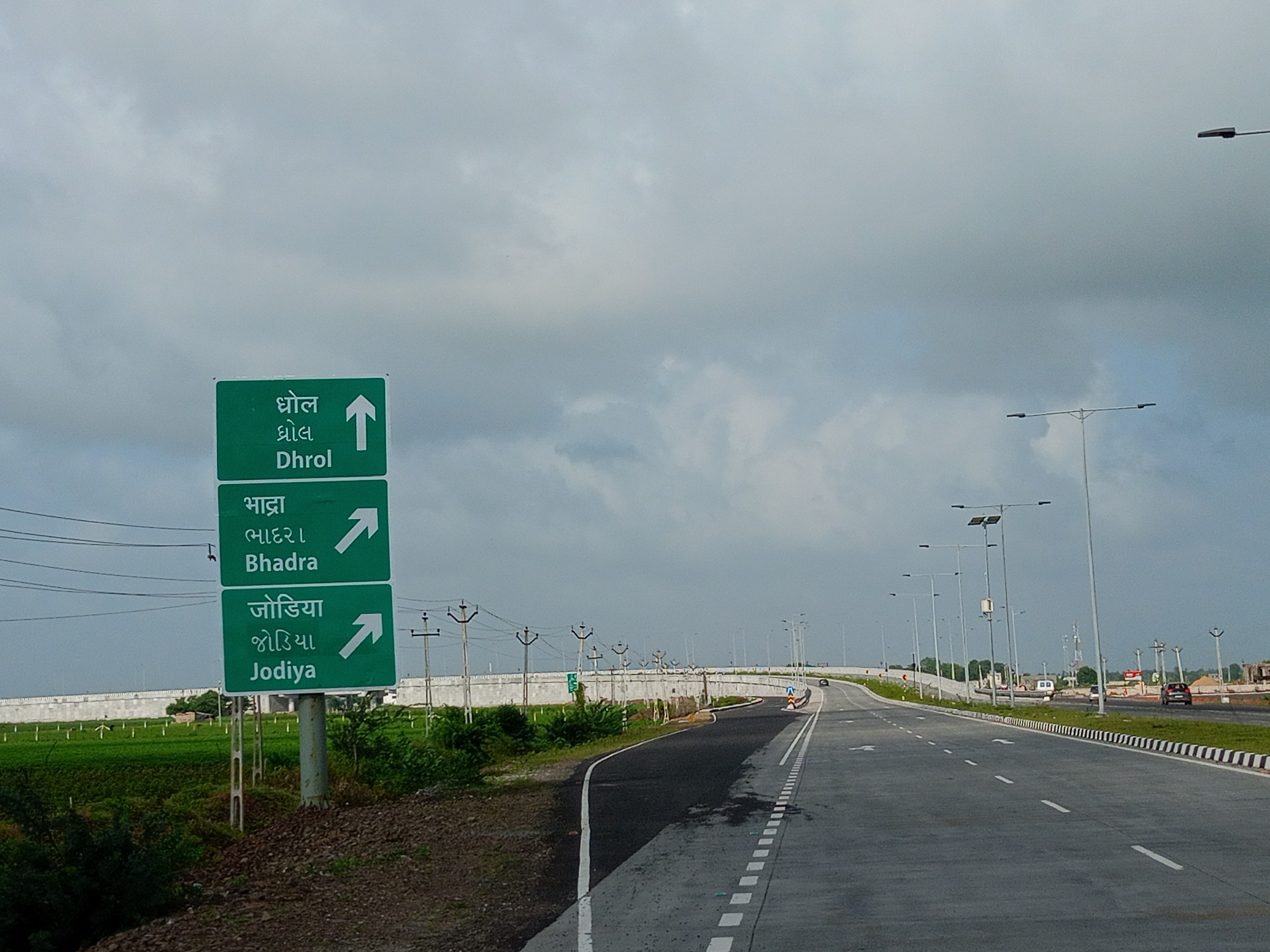
bhadra patiya section of NH151A which shows jodiya name

== Desalination plant ==
In November 2018, Gujarat Water Infrastructure Limited (GWIL) signed a memorandum of understanding with Essel InfraProjects to develop a 100 million liters per day (MLD) seawater desalination plant at the port of Jodia. The treatment plant was planned to provide water for the water grid of Gujarat for the next 25 years to Jamnagar, Rajkot and Morbi cities along with the other adjoining areas.

== Jodiya Port Revival ==
The Indian government is carrying out a survey to revive Jodiya Port with revival of 44.9 kilometres (27.9 mi) long Hadmatiya - Dhrol - Jodiya Railway line & construction of 44.1 kilometres (27.4 mi) long Jamnagar - Jodiya new Railway line.
