= Paddhari =

- Census town
- Location in Gujarat, India Paddhari (India)
- Coordinates: 22.43°N 70.6°E
- Country: India
- State: Gujarat
- District: Rajkot

Area
  - Total: 16.1 km^{2} (6.2 sq mi)
- Elevation: 62 m (203 ft)

Population (2011)
  - Total: 10,547
  - Rank: 1
  - Density: 655/km^{2} (1,700/sq mi)
- Demonym: Paddharian

Languages
  - Official: Gujarati, Hindi
- Time zone: UTC+5:30 (IST)
- PIN Code: 360110
- Vehicle registration: GJ-3

Paddhari is a census town in Rajkot district in the Indian state of Gujarat. Paddhari has headquarters of Paddhari Taluka.

== Geography ==
Paddhari is located at 22.43°N 70.6°E. It has an average elevation of 62 metres (203 ft).

== Demographics ==
As of 2001 India census, Paddhari had a population of 9225. Males constitute 51% of the population and females 49%. Paddhari has an average literacy rate of 65%, higher than the national average of 59.5%: male literacy is 70%, and female literacy is 59%. In Paddhari, 13% of the population is under 6 years of age.
