= Jamnagar =

City in Gujarat, India

Jamnagar Nawanagar
- City
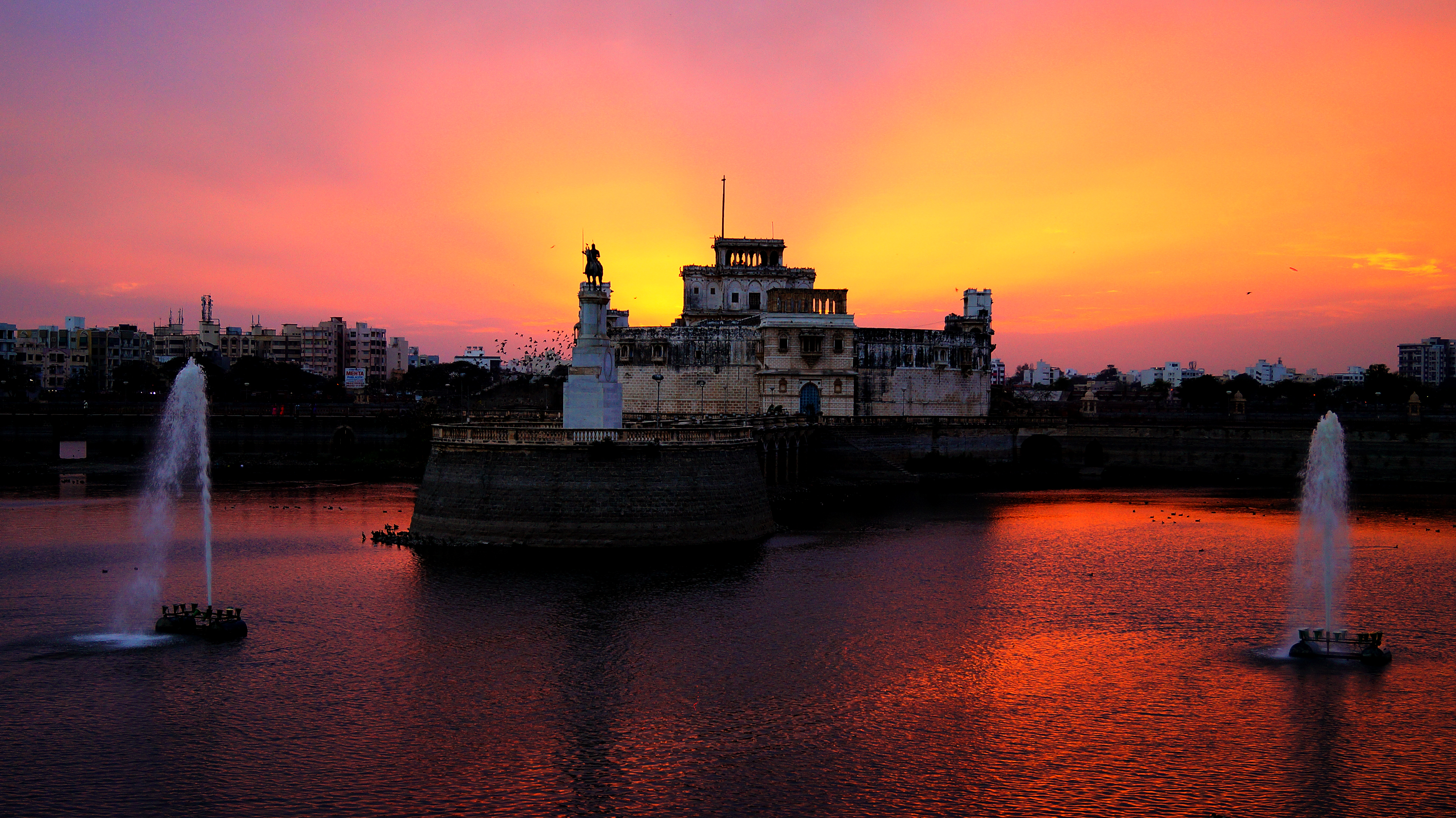
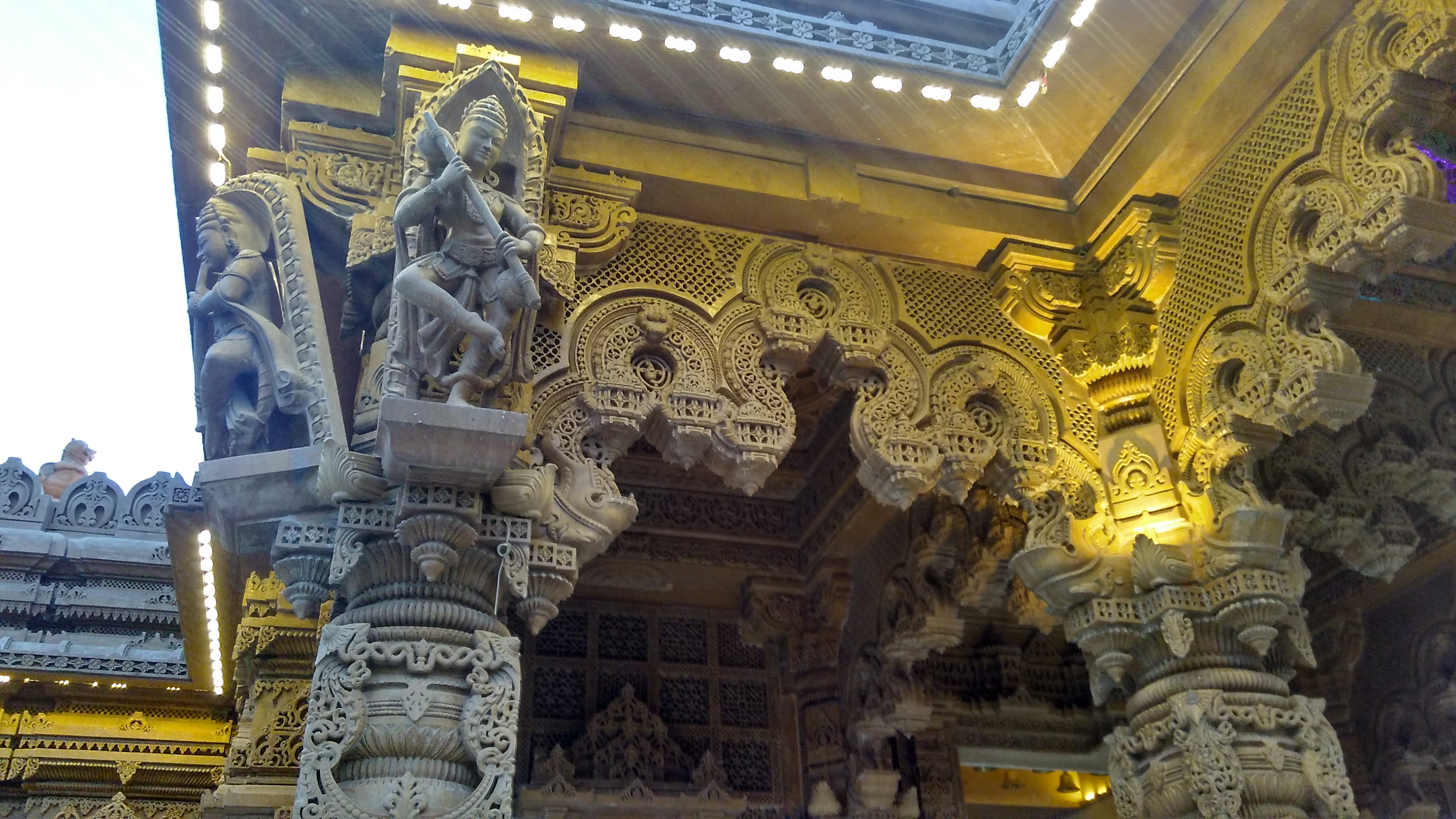
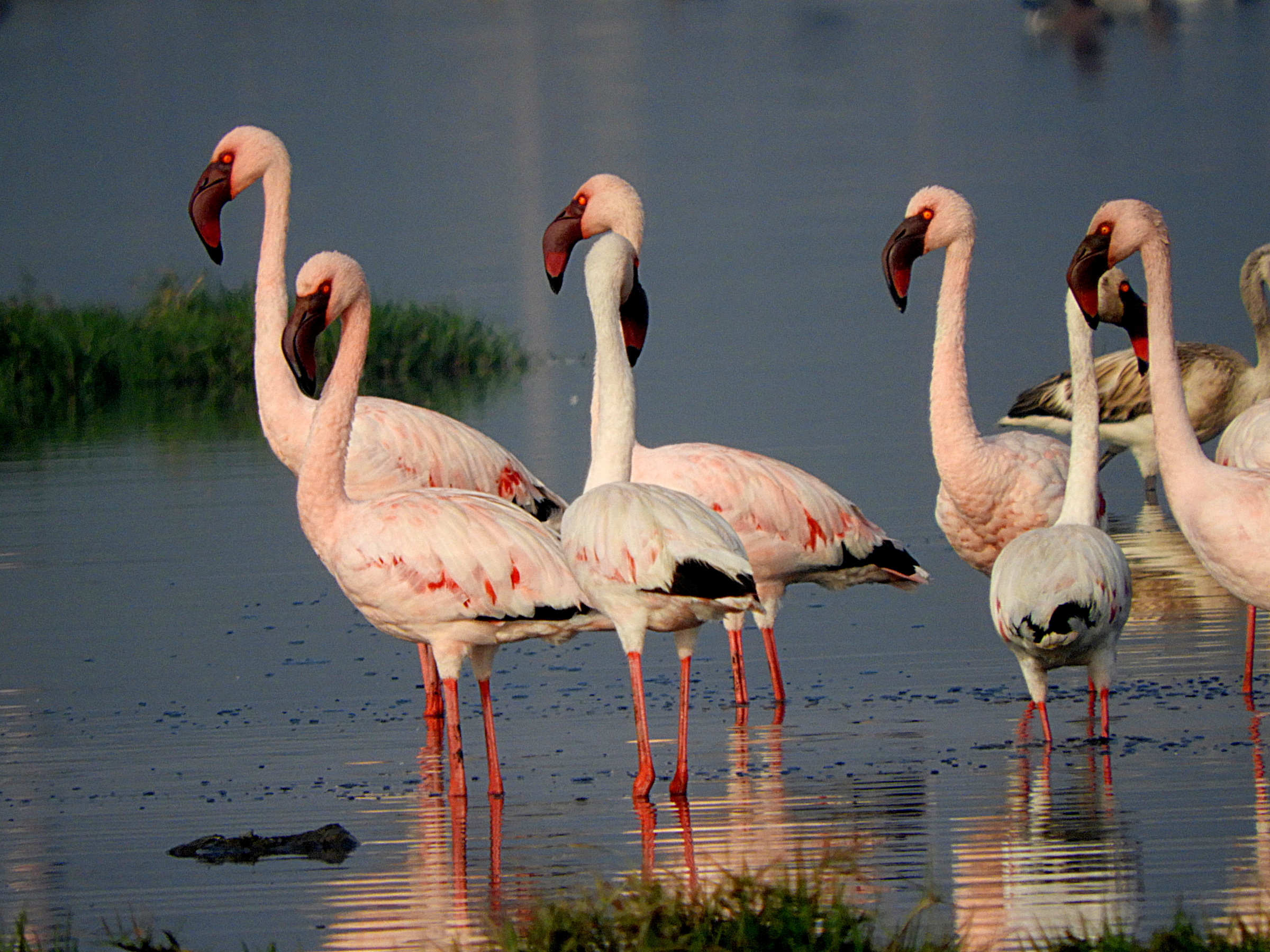
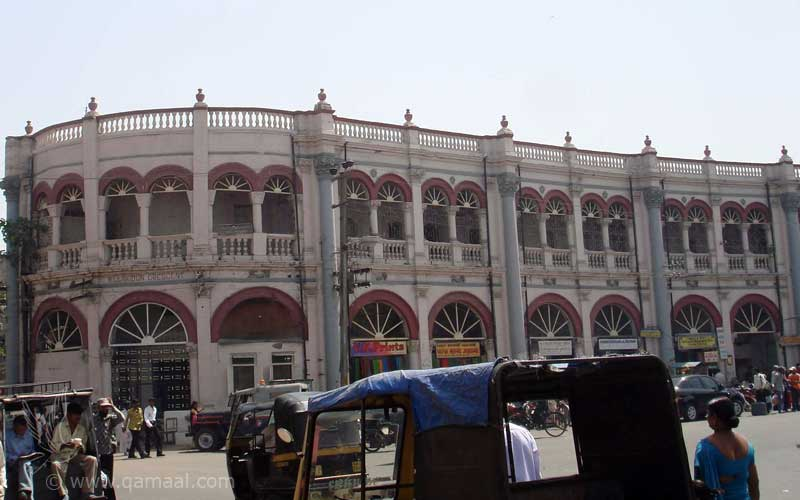
- Clockwise from top: Lakhota Lake, Lesser Flamingos, Darbar Garh Market, Swaminaryan Temple

- Logo of the Jamnagar Municipal Corporation

- Location in Gujarat, India Jamnagar (India)
- Coordinates: 22.47°N 70.07°E
- Country: India
- State: Gujarat
- Region: Saurashtra
- District: Jamnagar
- Established: August 1540
- Founder: Jam Rawal Jadeja
- Named for: Jam Rawal Jadeja

Government
  - Type: Municipal Corporation
  - Body: Jamnagar Municipal Corporation
  - Mayor: Monikaben Hemendrabhai Vyas

Area
  - Total: 121.80 km^{2} (47.03 sq mi)
  - Rank: 6
- Elevation: 17 m (56 ft)

Population (2025)
  - Total: 877,000 (Metropolitan)
  - Rank: India : 87th
  - Density: 5,780/km^{2} (15,000/sq mi)
- Demonym: Jamnagari
- Time zone: UTC+5:30 (IST)
- PIN: 361001-09
- Telephone code: 0288
- Vehicle registration: GJ-10
- Website: www.mcjamnagar.com

Jamnagar (Gujarati: Jāmnagar, pronounced [dʒaːmᵊn̪əgəɾᵊ]) is a city and the headquarters of Jamnagar district in the Indian state of Gujarat. The city lies just to the south of the Gulf of Kutch, some 337 kilometres (209 mi) west of the state capital, Gandhinagar. The city was the capital of Nawanagar princely state during British Raj.

India's largest private company, Reliance Industries, has established the world's largest oil refining and petrochemicals complex in Jamnagar district.

The World Health Organization (WHO) and the Government of India signed an agreement to establish the WHO Global Centre for Traditional Medicine in Jamnagar. This global knowledge centre for traditional medicine, supported by an investment of US$250 million from the Government of India, aims to harness the potential of traditional medicine from across the world through modern science and technology to improve the health of people and the planet.

India's largest private company, Reliance Industries is developing the world's largest zoo at a location of 28 km from Jamnagar city.

Jamnagar Municipal Corporation is planning to develop the riverfront on Rangmati – Nagmati river at an approximate cost of around Rs. 500 crores.

Jamnagar is famous for its traditional Bandhani (tie-dye) textiles, intricate silver and brass jewelry, unique handicrafts like agate paperweights, and specific snacks like Dryfruit Kachori and Ghughra, reflecting Gujarat's rich culture and craftsmanship, alongside its status as a major industrial hub for oil refining (Reliance Industries).

== History ==
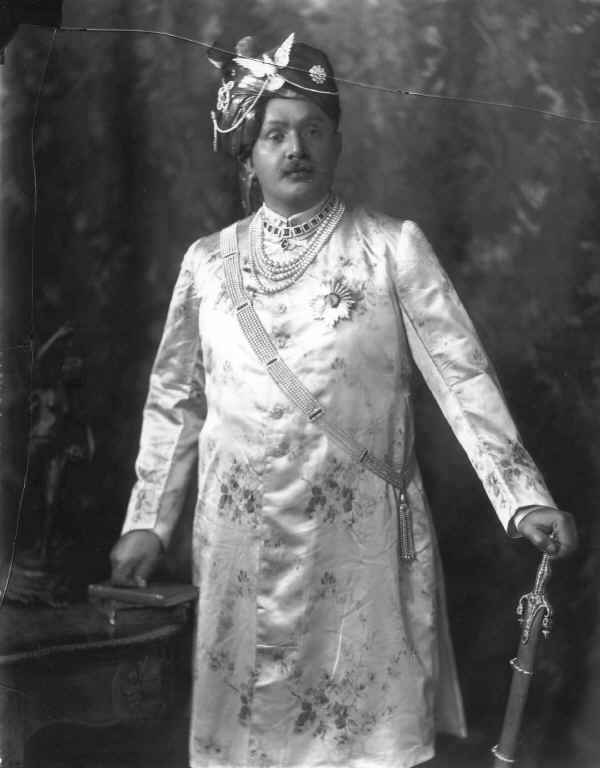
Maharaja Jamsaheb Shri of Nawanagar

Nawanagar was founded by Jam Rawal in 1540 as the capital of the eponymous princely state. Jamnagar, historically known as Nawanagar (the new town), was one of the most important and the largest princely states of the Jadejas in the Saurashtra region. It was a thirteen-gun salute state.

According to historical records, Bahadur Shah, Sultan of Gujarat bestowed upon Jam Lakhaji twelve villages in recognition of his role in the siege of Pawagadh. Shortly after he took possession of the villages, Jam Lakhaji was killed by his cousins, Tamachi Deda and Jam Hamir Jadeja. His son, Jam Rawal, murdered his father's killers and became ruler of Kutch. The State of Kutch was semi-independent from the Gujarat Sultanate.

Hamirji's sons, Khengarji and Sahibji, served the Sultan of Gujarat. During a hunt, the brothers saved the Sultan from being killed by a lion. As a reward for their valour, the Sultan sent an army with them to regain their kingdom. Jam Rawal prepared for battle after hearing that the two princes were returning to Kutch with the imperial army.

Goddess Ashapuraji, the supreme deity of the Jadeja Clan of Rajputs, appeared to Jam Rawal in a dream. She told him that although he had broken an oath taken in her name not to kill Hamirji, she had refrained from punishing him because he had previously honoured her. She said that Jam Rawal was no longer to dwell in Kutch.

As Jam Rawal and his entourage marched out of Kutch, they attacked and killed Tamachi Deda, the main conspirator in the murder of Jam Lakhaji. Jam Rawal also conquered the town of Amran and its dependencies, bestowing the rule of Dhrol province on his younger brother Hardholji. Hardholji died in battle at Mithoi near Khambhalia, passing the throne to his eldest son Jasoji. Jam Rawal conquered parts of Saurashtra and formed his kingdom with 999 villages named Halar.

While on a hunting trip in present-day Jamnagar, Jam Rawal's hunting dogs were scared by a hare brave enough to turn on them. Jam Rawal thought that if this land could breed such hares, the men born here would be superior to other men. As a result, he made this place his capital.

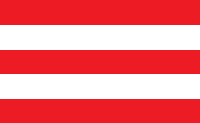
Flag of the Princely State of Nawanagar

On the seventh day of the bright half of the month of Shrawan, V.S.1956 (August 1540) on the banks of the Rangmati and Nagmati rivers, Jam Rawal laid the foundation of his new capital and named it Nawanagar (new town). After a few centuries, its name changed to Jamnagar or the Town of the JAMs.

During the 18th century, Nawanagar was ruled by the Jadeja Rajputs, who were known for their bravery and military prowess. They fought many battles with the neighbouring states and played a significant role in defending the region against foreign invasions.

In 1807, Nawanagar became a princely state under the British Raj. The first ruler of the state was Maharaja Ranjit Singhji, who was known for his progressive policies and efforts to modernize the state. He built many schools, hospitals, and other public facilities, and introduced a number of reforms to improve the lives of his subjects.

Jamsaib was instrumental in creating the city's modern infrastructure during his reign in the 1920s. Jam Saheb Shri Digvijaysinhji Ranjitsinhji expanded the city's development in the 1940s when it was part of the Princely state of Nawanagar.

== Geography ==
Major communities include the Jadeja, Khavas Rajput, Charan (Gadhvi), Satvaras (Dalvadis), Ahirs Sagars, Patels, Bhanushalis, Rajputs, Mers, Jains, Lohanas, Brahmins, Bhoi (Bhoiraj), and Vaghers (Muslim and Hindu)

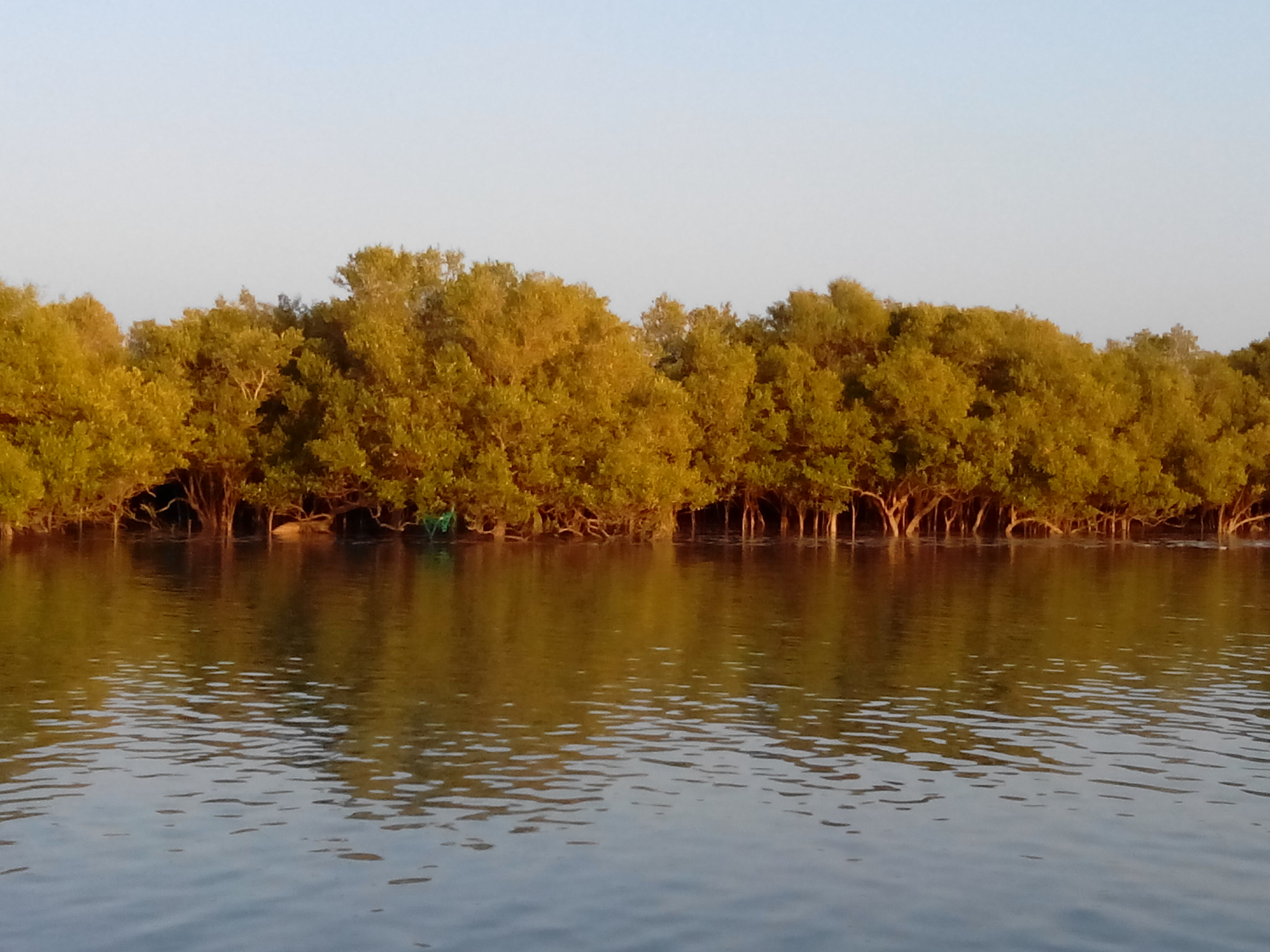
Mangroves jungle along canal near Pirotan Island

There are two important ports close to Jamnagar. Rozi Port is on the shore of the Gulf of Kutch; Bedi Port is two nautical miles (4 kilometres (2.5 mi)) inland on the Rangamati River. Bedi Port is an all-weather intermediate seaport that exports various commodities, including bauxite, soya meal extracts, and ground nut extracts. The port's imports include coal, fertilizer, and other items.

The coral reef island of Pirotan is one of the 42 islands which compose the Marine National Park. Pirotan lies in the Arabian Sea, 12 nautical miles off the coast, and stretches up to 3 square kilometres (1.2 sq mi).

Khijadia Bird Sanctuary, located 10 kilometres (6.2 mi) northeast of Jamnagar, was established 6 November 1982. It features a seasonal freshwater shallow lake, inter-tidal mudflats, creeks, saltpans, saline land, and mangrove scrub. The place is a known breeding ground of the Great Crested Grebe, the Little Grebe, Purple Moorhen, Coot, Black-winged Stilt, and Pheasant-tailed Jacana. Raptors, including Harriers, Eagles, Hawks, and Falcons also live here. The sanctuary also shelters migratory birds such as Swallows, Martins, Wagtails, and Waterfowl.

Jamnagar has huge reserves of bauxite, with its mines contributing 95% of the total production in the state.

=== Climate ===
Jamnagar has a hot semi-arid climate (Köppen: BSh). There are three defined seasons. The hot season lasts from March to May and is extremely hot and humid. Next is the wet season with extremely erratic monsoonal rainfall that averages around 500 millimetres (20 in). However, rainfall has varied from less than 100 millimetres (3.9 in) in 1911 and 1939 to over 1,500 millimetres (59.1 in) in 2010. Tropical cyclones sometimes affect the region during this period. The cool season is from October to February when it remains hot during the day but has negligible rainfall, low humidity, and cool nights.

The highest recorded temperature in Jamnagar was 47 °C (116.6 °F) on 5 May 1990, while the lowest recorded temperature was 1 °C (33.8 °F) on 5 February 1984.

Climate data for Jamnagar
Month	Jan	Feb	Mar	Apr	May	Jun	Jul	Aug	Sep	Oct	Nov	Dec	Year
Record high °C (°F)	36 (97)	38 (100)	44 (111)	45 (113)	47 (117)	46 (115)	40 (104)	39 (102)	41 (106)	43 (109)	40 (104)	38 (100)	47 (117)
Mean daily maximum °C (°F)	26.5 (79.7)	28.8 (83.8)	33 (91)	35.6 (96.1)	36.4 (97.5)	35.9 (96.6)	32.3 (90.1)	31.5 (88.7)	32 (90)	34.5 (94.1)	32.4 (90.3)	28 (82)	32.2 (90.0)
Daily mean °C (°F)	18.6 (65.5)	20.9 (69.6)	25.4 (77.7)	28.6 (83.5)	30.9 (87.6)	31.4 (88.5)	29.2 (84.6)	28.4 (83.1)	27.9 (82.2)	28 (82)	24.3 (75.7)	20.1 (68.2)	26.1 (79.0)
Mean daily minimum °C (°F)	9.7 (49.5)	13.8 (56.8)	17.8 (64.0)	21.6 (70.9)	25.4 (77.7)	27 (81)	26.2 (79.2)	25.4 (77.7)	23.9 (75.0)	20.7 (69.3)	14.7 (58.5)	11.4 (52.5)	19.8 (67.7)
Record low °C (°F)	1 (34)	1 (34)	9 (48)	13 (55)	18 (64)	20 (68)	10 (50)	12 (54)	16 (61)	11 (52)	8 (46)	1 (34)	1 (34)
Average precipitation mm (inches)	1 (0.0)	1 (0.0)	0 (0)	0 (0)	5 (0.2)	61 (2.4)	213 (8.4)	126 (5.0)	64 (2.5)	11 (0.4)	4 (0.2)	1 (0.0)	487 (19.1)
Source 1: Climate-Data.org (altitude: 23 metres or 75 feet), Voodoo Skies for record temperatures
Source 2: Jamnagar Weather

== Demographics ==
Jamnagar metropolitan area population in 2025 is 8,77,000.. Jamnagar has an average literacy rate of 82.14%, higher than the national average of 74.04%. Its male literacy rate is 86.90%, and its female literacy rate is 77.05%. In Jamnagar, 10% of the population is under six years of age. Males constitute 53% of the population and females 47%. The urban development authority of Jamnagar is Jamnagar Area Development Authority (JADA).

Most residents of Jamnagar are Gujarati and speak the Gujarati language. A small portion of the population speaks the Kutchi language, which is written in the Gujarati script but not mutually intelligible with Gujarati. The Kathiawadi language, a colloquial dialect of Gujarati, is widely used for day-to-day communication.

Historical religious demographics in Nawanagar Municipality
Religion	Population (1901)	Percentage (1901)
Hinduism	32,005	59.44%
Islam	17,027	31.62%
Jainism	4031	7.49%
Zoroastrianism	111	0.21%
Christianity	79	0.15%
Judaism	1	0%
Total	53,844	100%

== Economy ==
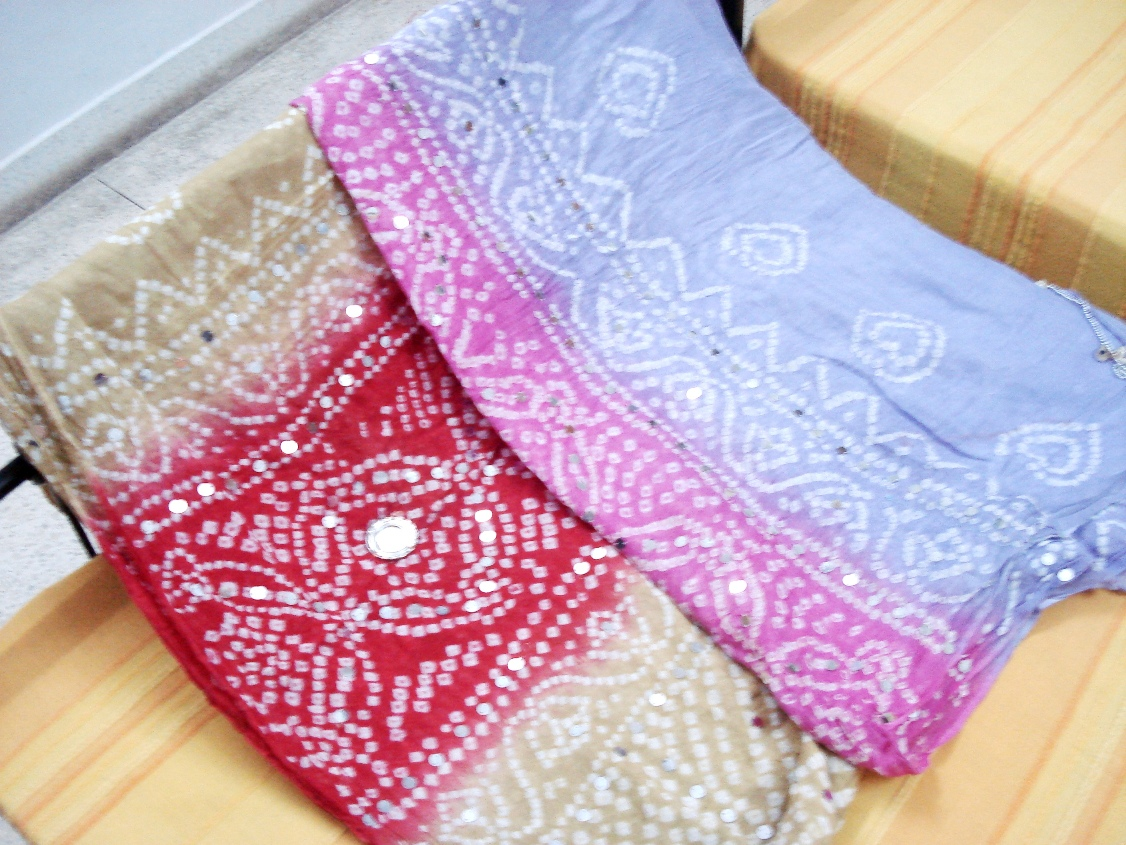
Bandhej cloth

The local population has given up its ancestral fishing businesses and has adopted different jobs created by industrialization and the arrival of several giant companies. Approximately 10% of the city's population earns their income by producing and exporting traditional Bandhani cloth. Digjam runs a composite mill manufacturing worsted fabrics at Jamnagar. It has been a notable player in the worsted textile industry in India.

Jamnagar was formerly known as the Brass City because it houses more than 5,000 large-scale and 10,000 small-scale workshops that manufacture brass items. Most workshops are in and around the industrial estates of Shankar Tekri, GIDC Phase-III, M P Shah Udhyognagar, and Dared GIDC-II Industrial estate. The workshops make brass parts and extruded rods for export. Jamnagar is the largest producer of brass items in India.

Jamnagar is home to the world's largest oil refinery, the Jamnagar Refinery, a private-sector crude oil refinery owned by Reliance Industries Limited. The refinery was commissioned on 14 July 1999 Nayara Energy owns Vadinar Refinery. India's second-largest single-site refinery is at Vadinar, Gujarat.

Jamnagar has base stations for the Indian Air Force, the Indian Army, and the Indian Navy. The city has a strategic location close to Pakistan. It also has sizable reserves of bauxite, with its mines contributing 95% of the total production in the state.

== Arts and culture ==
=== Religion ===
Religion in Jamnagar
Religion	Percent
Hinduism	77.59%
Islam	18.99%
Jainism	2.51%
Others	0.91%

Jamnagar has several temples, such as Sidhnath Mahadev Temple, Badri Kedar Nath, Nilkanth Mahadev Temple, and Bhid Bhanjan Mahadev Temple near the Town Hall and the Kashi Vishwanath Temple on K.V. Road. It is also well known for its four marble Jain temples: Vardhman Shah's Temple, Raisi Shah's Temple, Sheth's Temple, and Vasupujya Swami's Temple. All of these temples date to between 1574 and 1622. There are more than 30 Jain temples in Jamnagar.

The Bala Hanuman Temple on the southeastern side of Ranmal Lake is known for the continuous chanting of the mantra "Sri Ram, Jai Ram, Jai Jai Ram". Starting on 1 August 1964, this chant continues for 24 hours a day, earning the temple a place in the Guinness Book of World Records. Thousands of devotees visit the temple every year. Bholeshwar Mahadev Temple holds a fair every year on Shravani Amavas (New-moon day). During the holy month of Shravana, there are Hindu fairs on the dried river banks near Bohra Hajira.

=== Architecture ===
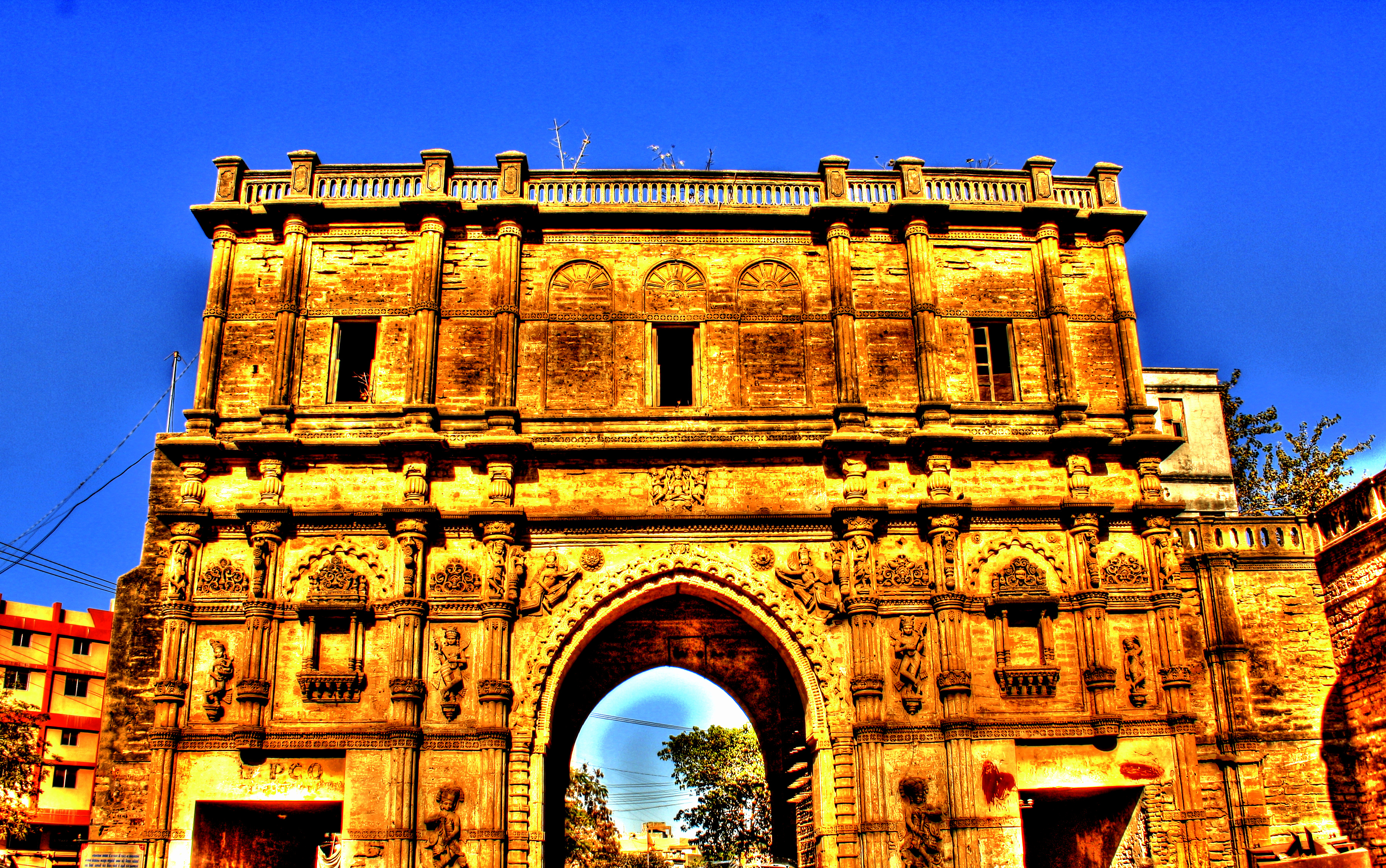
Khambaliya Gate

The Bohra Hajira is a white marble mausoleum built by Jam Rawal in 1540. Also known as Mazar E Badri, it is the resting place of the Muslim saint Mota Bawa. Bohra Hajira is on the banks of the Nagmati and Rangmati Rivers. The mausoleum is of Saracenic style and features intricate carvings. Jamnagar Trimandir is a two-storey structure with a large hall on the ground floor and a temple on the first floor. Wazir Meraman Khawa built the Khambhaliya Gate in the 17th century. It is one of two remaining city gates from that period.

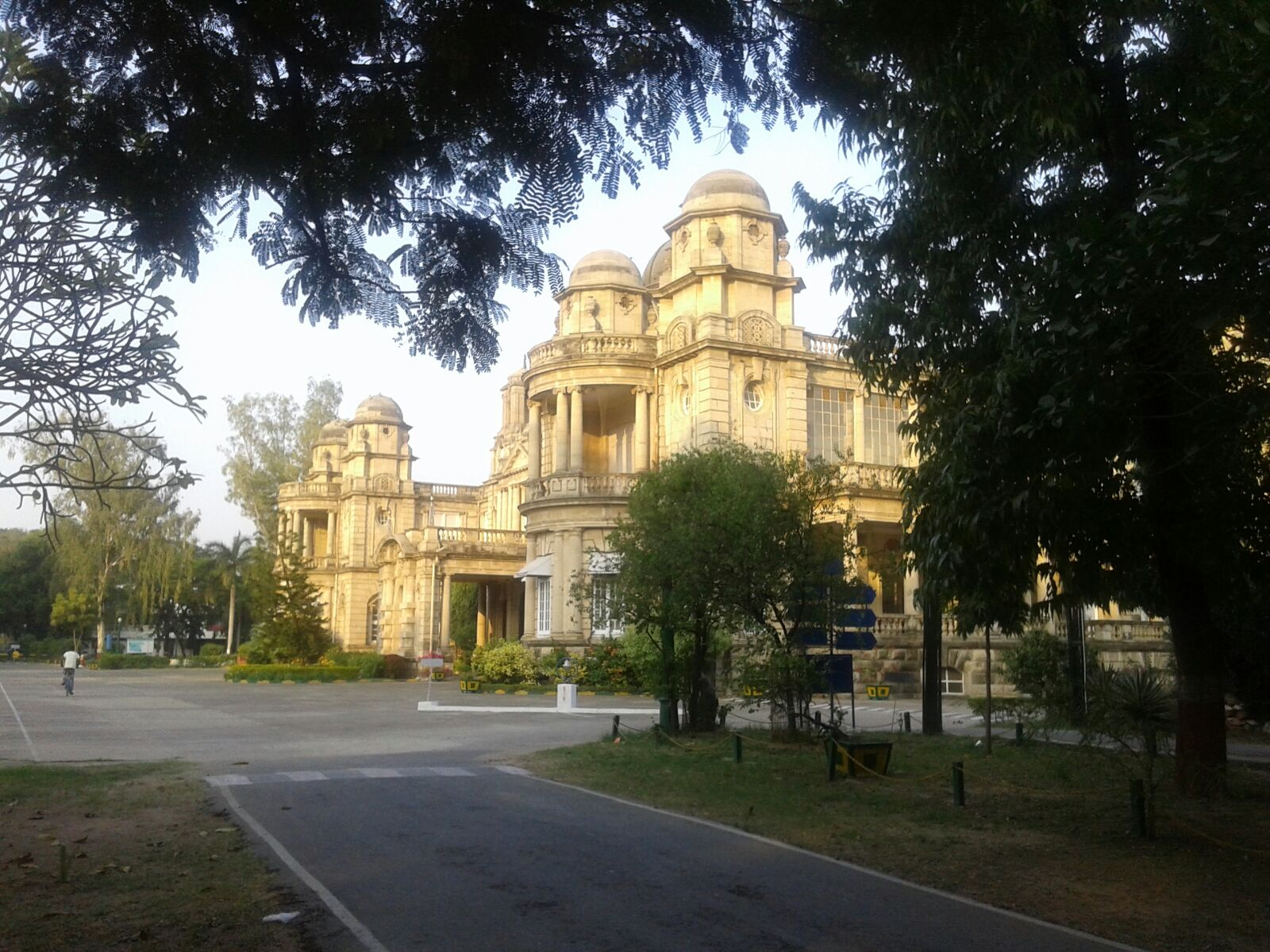
Pratap Vilas Palace

Pratap Vilas Palace, built during the rule of His Royal Highness Ranjitsinhji, features European architectural style with Indian carvings. It is an imitation of the Victoria Memorial Building in Calcutta, but its domes are in the tradition of Indian architecture. Three of the domes are glass. The palace's columns feature carvings of creepers, flowers, leaves, birds, and animals. The 2001 earthquake caused some damage to its parapets and the separation of some upper walls at the roof level in some corners. Willingdon Crescent (known Darbargarh Market now) was constructed by Ranjit Singh to replace a slum area. Inspired by Singh's European travels, it is an arcade of cusped arches, bigger on the ground floor and smaller on the upper storey. It has pilasters on the curving walls and balusters on the parapet. There is a statue of Jam Saheb in the center of the crescent. The 2001 Gujarat earthquake caused slight damage to this shopping area.

== Sports ==
Cricket is a popular sport in Jamnagar. A number of Indian Test cricketers hail from Jamnagar, including Vinoo Mankad, Indrajitsinhji, Ajay Jadeja, and Ravindra Jadeja. HH Shri Jam Ranjitsinji built the Ajitsinhji Pavilion cricket ground in 1908. The Ranji Trophy and Duleep Trophy Indian cricket competitions were named in memory of the princes of Jamnagar.

The municipal corporation built the sports complex with a swimming pool, badminton court, and other facilities. There is also an 80-year-old sports club, Summair Sports Club, built by the erstwhile rulers of Jamnagar. It has a swimming pool, tennis, squash, and badminton courts, a billiard hall, a table tennis facility, and a hotel.

== Parks and Recreation ==
Sardar Vallabhbhai Patel Amusement Park is a popular public amusement park located on Mehulnagar 80 Feet Road near Kamdar Colony in Jamnagar, Gujarat, India It is named after the Indian statesman Sardar Vallabhbhai Patel and spread over approximately 19,500 sq m, offering a mix of recreational facilities for families and children. The park features a variety of attractions including rides, a musical fountain, rain dance zone, food court, game area, jogging track, yoga hall and amphitheatre, making it a desirable picnic and leisure destination. Operated by the Jamnagar Municipal Corporation, it is frequented by locals and visitors alike for outdoor fun and fitness activities.

The Kotha Bastion museum contains sculptures, coins, inscriptions, copper plates, and the skeleton of a whale. The museum also has an old well where water is drawn by blowing into a small hole in the floor. The Lakhota Museum is in the former Lakhota Palace. This small museum has a collection of sculptures from the 9th to the 18th centuries, antique weapons, and pottery found in medieval villages from the surrounding area.

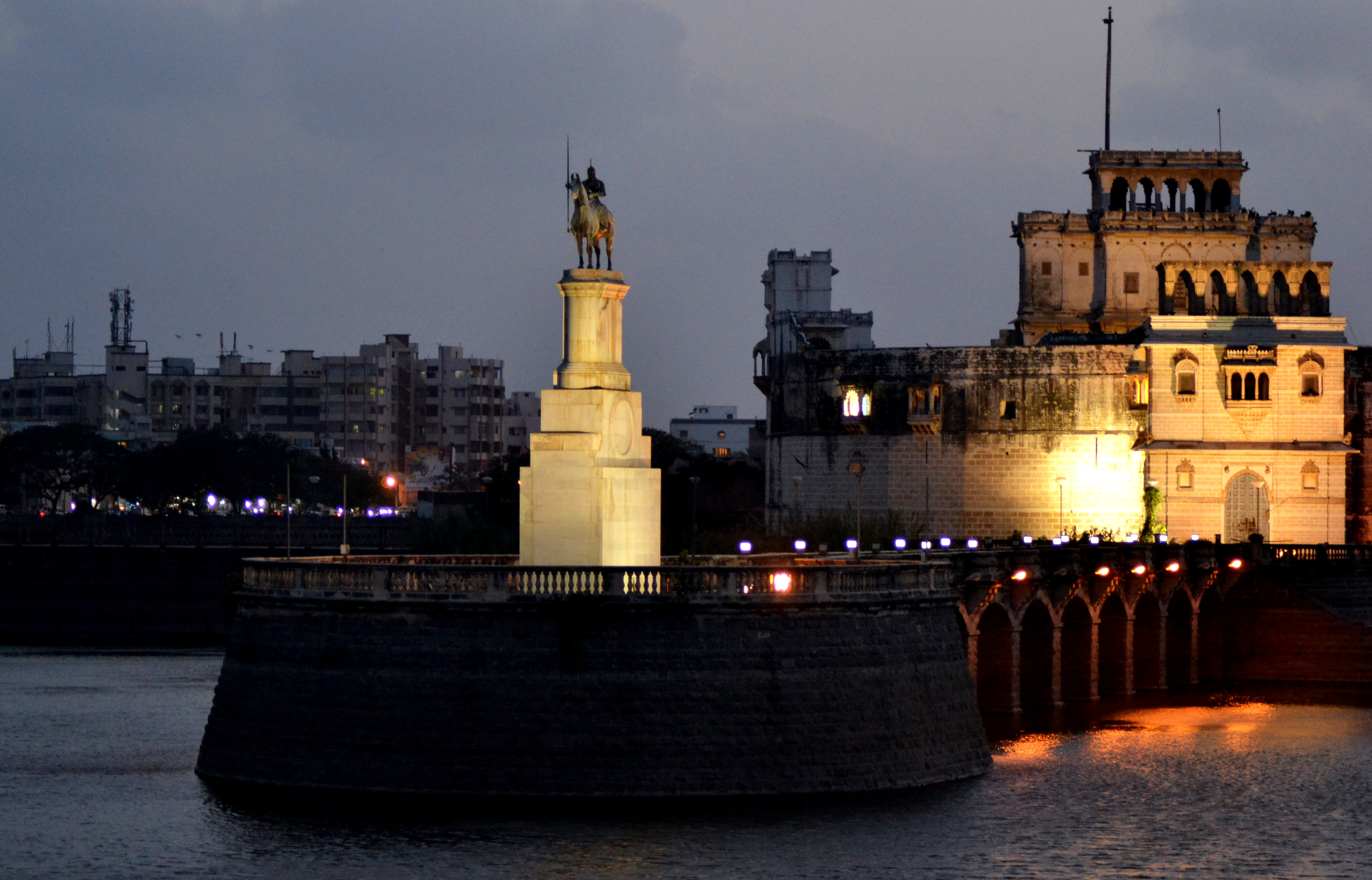
Lakhota palace

The Marine National Park on the Gulf of Kutch is India's first marine sanctuary. Located about 7 kilometres (4.3 mi) from the city centre, the park includes an archipelago of 42 islands noted for their coral reefs and mangroves. The area attracts birds, dolphins, finless porpoises, sea turtles, and tropical fish.

=== Vantara Animal Shelter and Wildlife Conservation Centre ===
Vantara is a 300-acre animal shelter conservatory launched by Anant Ambani and supported by Reliance Industries and Reliance Foundation. The facility focuses on providing and caring for abused, injured and endangered animals. The conservation centre is equipped with cutting-edge healthcare hospital facilities, a research institute and academic zones.

== Education ==
Jamnagar has many private and government-granted schools, including Jawahar Navodaya Vidyalaya; Podar International School and St. Xavier's High School, Jamnagar.

Jamnagar also has dental and health colleges, including M. P. Shah Medical College and Gujarat Ayurved University There are several colleges for arts, commerce, and science.

== Infrastructure ==
=== Transportation ===
Amritsar–Jamnagar Expressway(NH-754) is an under-construction 1,257 km long, 6-lane wide expressway in the north-western part of India. The expressway will reduce the distance between Amritsar and Jamnagar from earlier 1,430 km to 1,316 km (including Kapurthala-Amritsar section) and the time travel from 26 hours to only 13 hours. It is a part of the Bharatmala and Amritsar–Jamnagar Economic Corridor (EC-3). It will pass through four states of Punjab, Haryana, Rajasthan and Gujarat. The expressway is strategically important, as it will connect 3 big oil refineries of HMEL Bathinda, HPCL Barmer and Reliance Industries Limited(RIL) Refinery near Jamnagar. It will also connect Guru Nanak Dev Thermal Plant (Bathinda) and Suratgarh Super Thermal Power Plant (Sri Ganganagar). The expressway will meet the Ludhiana-Bathinda-Ajmer Expressway of the Pathankot–Ajmer Economic Corridor at Bathinda. The construction work on the expressway started in Haryana and Rajasthan in 2019. The Rajasthan section of the expressway from Jakhrawali in Hanumangarh district to Khetlawas in Jalore district was completed in early 2023 and was inaugurated by Prime Minister Narendra Modi on 8 July 2023, while the entire expressway is expected to be opened by September 2023.

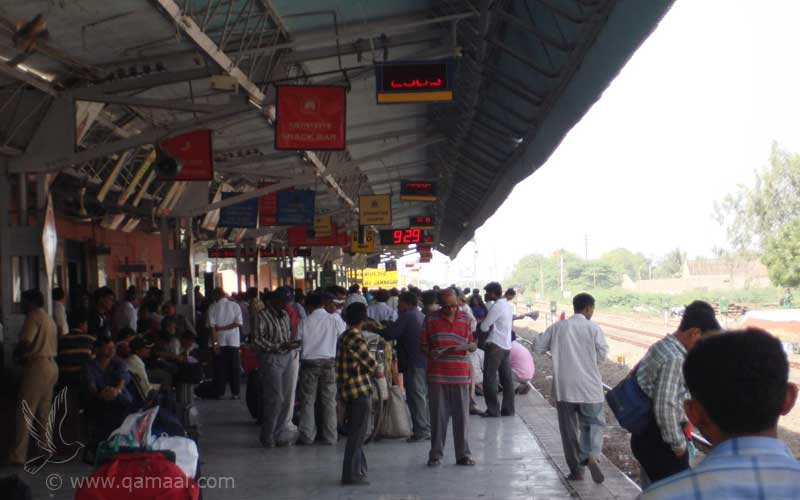
Jamnagar Railway Station platform

On 24 November 2025, Chief Minister Shri Bhupendra Patel inaugurated Saurashtra's longest flyover bridge, constructed at a cost of ₹226.99 crore (₹2,269,900,000) in Jamnagar. The total length of the four-lane elevated flyover bridge from Sat Rasta Circle to Subhash Chandra Bose Statue, including 4 approaches, is 3,750 metres. The main bridge consists of four lanes measuring 16.50 metres, while the approaches on Indira Marg and Dwarka Road consist of two lanes of 8.40 metres.

There are many private bus service providers with coaches running between Jamnagar and Rajkot, Bhuj, Ahmedabad, Surat, Vadodara, Mumbai, Pune, Delhi and other major cities. State Transport has bus services to almost all cities of Gujarat State and interstate transport facilities. The Jamnagar Municipal Corporation runs local buses. Also, Ola Cabs and auto rickshaws are available. Jamnagar has a railway station connected with a variety of India's destinations. Four daily trains go to Mumbai and weekly trains to the major cities to the north, east, and south of the country. The city has an airport with a daily direct flight to Mumbai and thrice-in-a-week flights to Hyderabad and Bengaluru. The airport is within a military enclave of the Indian Air Force.

=== Civic utilities ===
India's first IGBC platinum-rated net-zero green waste-to-energy campus is located in Jamnagar, established by Abellon Clean energy and designed by INI Design Studio. Per year, the facility processes 220,000 tons of municipal solid waste into 7.5 MW clean energy. The facility's design involves almost no human interface during the process and also has a see-through design inside the processing plant making it an educational hub for schools and visitors. The campus uses only 20% of its land for the facility and the other 80% is used for community activities and interactions.

== Media ==
All India Radio airs at 100.1 MHz. Top FM airs at 91.9 MHz. Radio Mirchi airs at 95 MHz.

Daily local and national newspapers are available in Jamnagar in multiple languages, including The Times of India, Economic Times, Indian Express, and Business Standard. Local newspapers published in Gujarati include Aajkaal, Bhoomi, Jamnagar Bhaskar, Khabar Gujarat, Lokwat, and Nobat. The Princely State is the local English language newspaper.

== Notable people ==
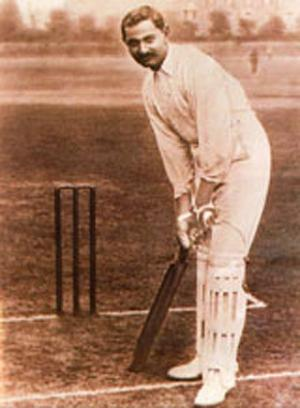
Ranjitsinhji, English cricketer, former King of Jamnagar princely state, British India.

The following individuals were born or have lived in Jamnagar:

- Ruskin Bond, author
- Ranjitsinhji, King of erstwhile Nawanagar State, first international cricketer of India, represented England cricket team.
- Vinoo Mankad, former cricketer
- Duleepsinhji, former cricketer
- Salim Durani, Indian former test cricketer
- Remo D'Souza, dancer, choreographer, actor, and film director
- Indrajitsinhji, ex test cricketer
- Ajay Jadeja, former ODI cricketer
- Rajendrasinhji Jadeja, first Chief of Army Staff
- Ravindra Jadeja, Indian cricketer
- Digvijaysinhji Ranjitsinhji, Jam Sahib of Nawanagar, also known as The Good Maharaja

== See also ==
- Amrapur, Jamnagar, Gujarat
- Largest Indian cities by GDP
