= Kalavad =

- City
- Nickname: Kalavad (Shitla)
- Location in Gujarat, India Kalavad (India)
- Coordinates: 22.22°N 70.38°E
- Country: India
- State: Gujarat
- District: Jamnagar
- Elevation: 87 m (285 ft)

Population (2001)
  - Total: 24,857

Languages
  - Official: Gujarati, Hindi
- Time zone: UTC+5:30 (IST)
- Postal code: 361160
- Vehicle registration: GJ-10
- Website: gujaratindia.com

Kalavad is a city and a municipality in Jamnagar district in the Indian state of Gujarat. Kalavad is known for Shitla Mataji Temple. The Pin Code of Kalavad is 361160.

== Geography ==
Kalavad is located at 22.22°N 70.38°E. It has an average elevation of 87 metres (285 feet).

== Demographics ==
As of 2001 India census, Kalavad had a population of 24,857. Males constitute 50% of the population and females 50%. Kalavad has an average literacy rate of 68%, higher than the national average of 59.5%: male literacy is 73%, and female literacy is 63%. In Kalavad, 11% of the population is under 6 years of age.

== Transport ==
National Highway 927D connects Kalavad with Dhoraji and Jamnagar.
