= Jamnagar district =

- District of Gujarat
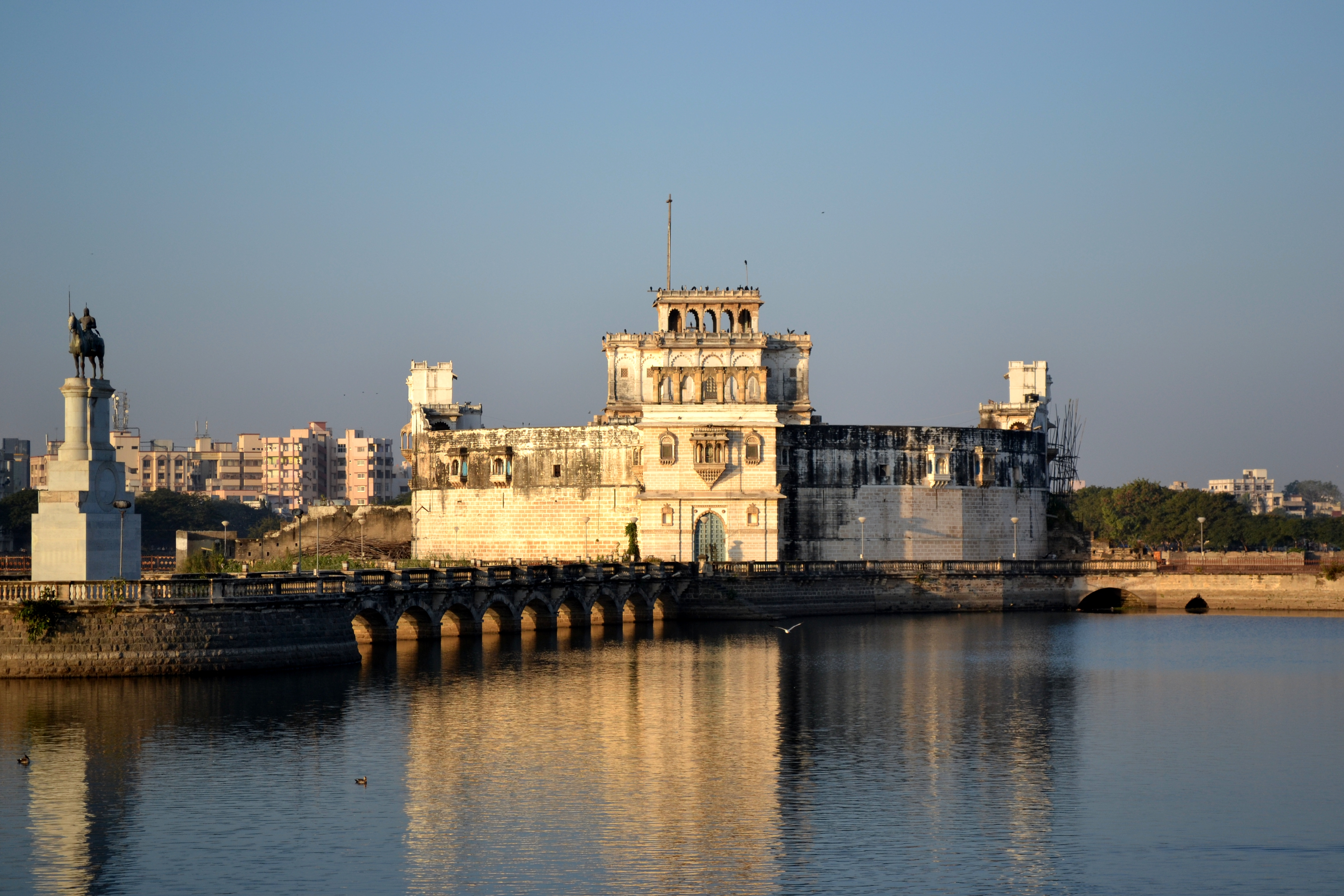
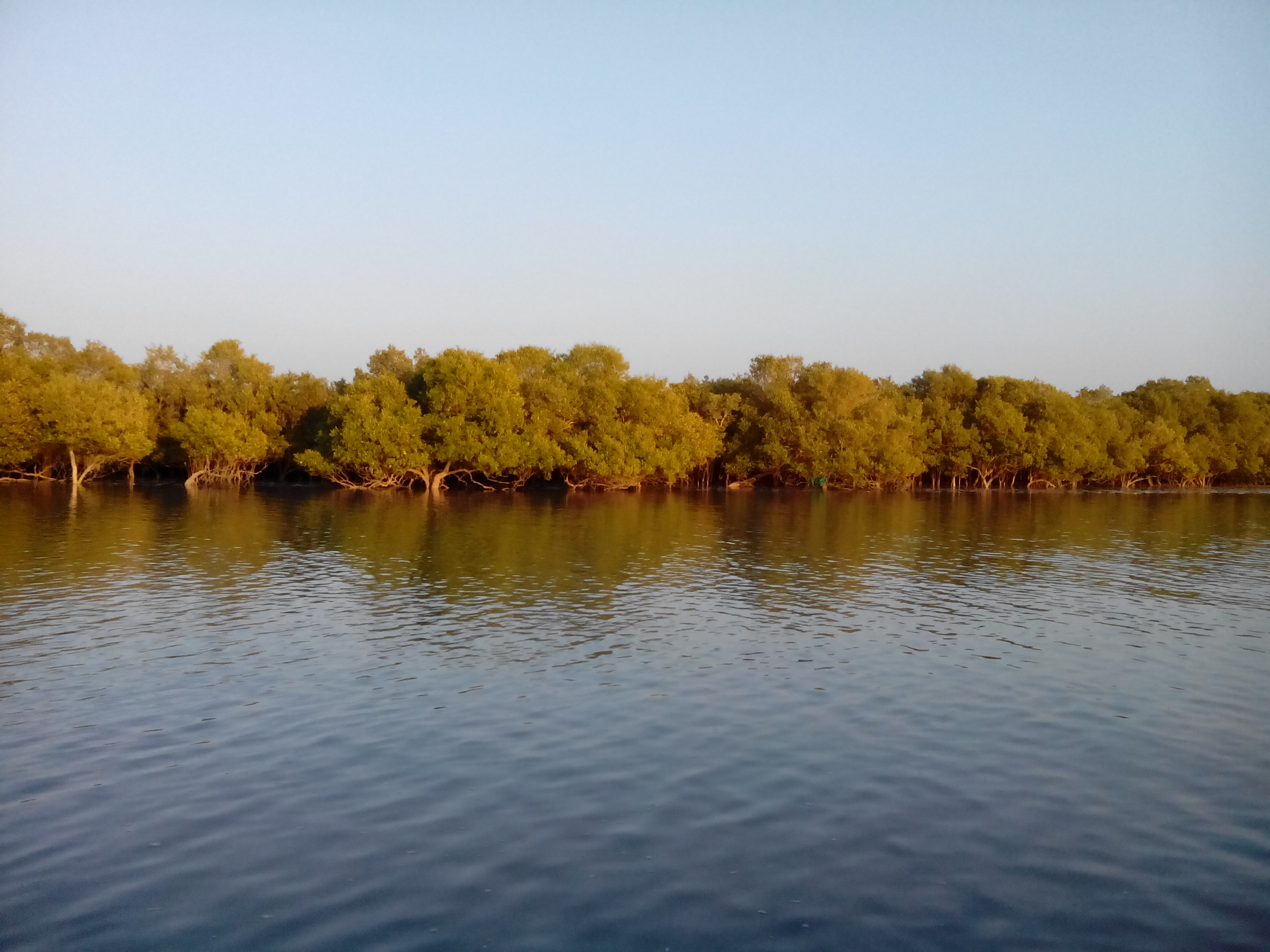
- Top: Lakhota Lake and museum, Jamnagar; Bottom: Mangroves in Pirotan Marine Reserve

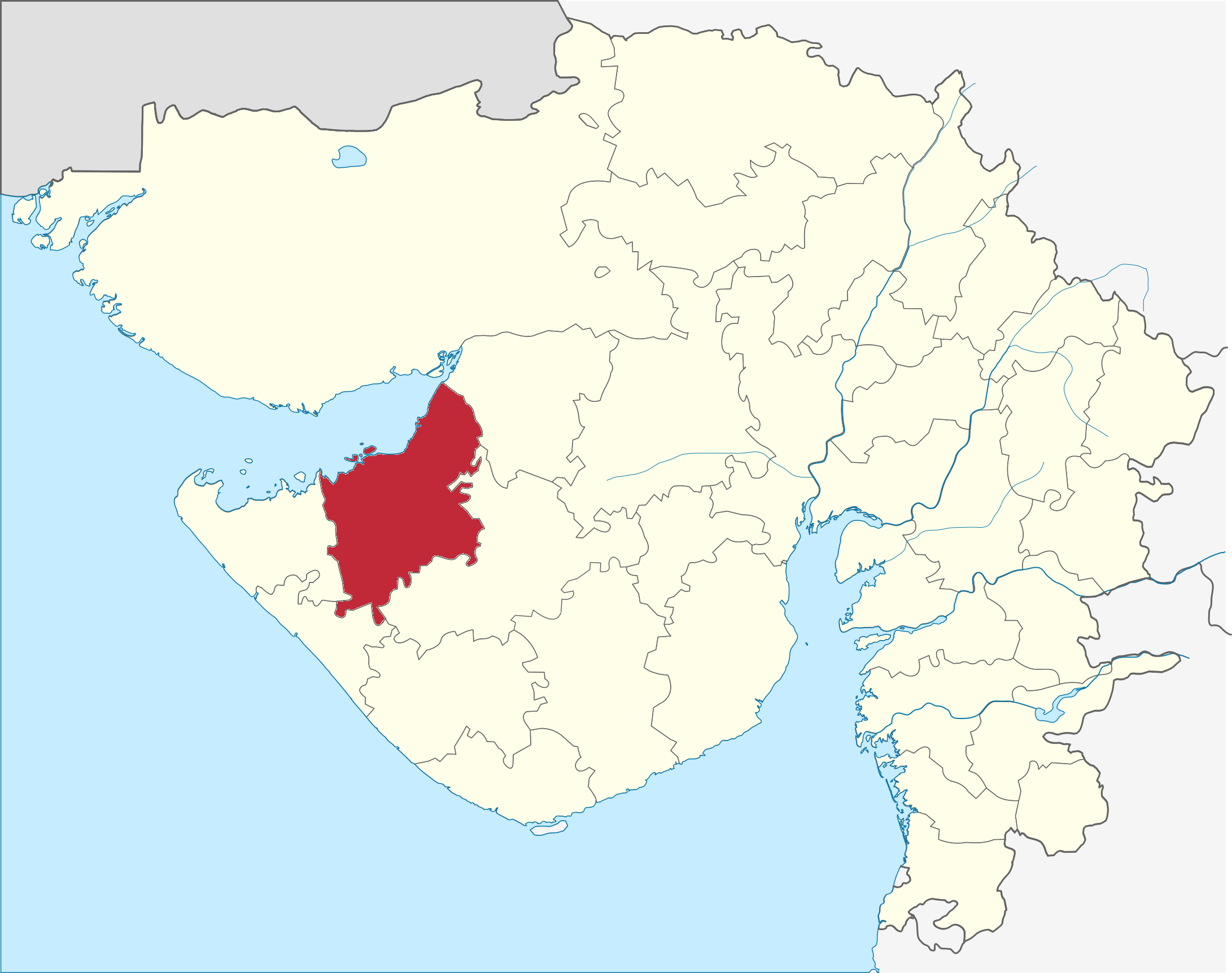
- Location of district in Gujarat
- Interactive map of Jamnagar district
- Coordinates: 22°15′N 70°00′E
- Country: India
- State: Gujarat
- Region: Saurashtra
- Headquarters: Jamnagar

Government
  - Collector & DM: Shri B. K. Pandya, IAS
  - Police Superintendent: Shri Premsukh Delu, IPS
  - District Development Officer: Shri Vikalp Bhardwaj, IAS
  - District Supply Officer: Shri Sudhir Barad
  - ICT Officer: Shri R. N. Thakariya

Area
  - Total: 14,184 km^{2} (5,476 sq mi)

Population (2023)
  - Total: 2,516,000
  - Density: 177.4/km^{2} (459.4/sq mi)

Languages
  - Official: Gujarati, Hindi
- Time zone: UTC+5:30 (IST)
- Vehicle registration: GJ-10
- Website: jamnagar.nic.in

Jamnagar district is a district of Gujarat in Western India. Its headquarters are located in the eponymous city of Jamnagar. It hosts the production facilities of large Indian companies such as Reliance. Among its attractions are several palaces, a Marine National Park and a Bird Sanctuary, known as Khijadiya Bird Sanctuary. In 2013, Devbhoomi Dwarka district was carved out of the western part of the district.

India's largest private company, Reliance Industries is developing world's largest zoo near by 28 kms from Jamnagar city. In Jamnagar, the company is also setting up biggest gigafactory, the biggest solar energy, the world's artificial intelligence infrastructure and Vantara (large-scale wildlife rescue and rehabilitation centre).

Jamnagar Municipal Corporation is planning to develop a riverfront on Rangmati – Nagmati river which costs around 500 crore (5 billion) INR.

== History ==
Jamnagar was founded by Jam Rawalji Jadeja in 1540 A.D. as the capital of the Princely State of Nawanagar. Jamnagar, historically known as Nawanagar (the new town), was one of the most important princely states of the Jadeja's in the region of Saurashtra.

According to bardic chronicles, impressed by Jam Lakhaji's role in at the siege of Pawagadh, Bahadurshah, the Emperor of Gujarat, bestowed 12 villages on him. As Jam Lakaji was going to take possession of his new fief, he was treacherously killed by his cousins, Tamachi Deda and Hamirji Jadeja. Jam Lakhajis son Jam Rawal escaped and on growing up, took vengeance of his father's murder in the same manner by killing Hamirji Jadeja.

Hamirji's two sons Khengarji and Sahibji fled to Delhi to pay obeisance to the mughal Emperor Humayun. During a lion hunt, the two brothers saved the Emperor from being killed by the lion. As a reward for their valour, an army was sent with them to regain their kingdom. When Jam Rawal heard of the two princes coming back to the Kutch with the imperial army, he started getting ready for the battle. On one night, he dreamt of the goddess Ashapura who told him that as he had broken an oath taken on her name about not killing Hamirji, even though, he was the person responsible for the death of his father. She had refrained from punishing him as he had at all other times honored her, but he was no longer to dwell in Kutch but cross the sea and reside in Kathiawar instead.

Jam Rawal and his entourage marched out of Kutch, attacked and killed King Tamachi the other conspirator in the killing of his father, and conquered the town of Dhrol and its dependencies. Jam Rawal bestowed the rule of Dhrol province to his brother Hardholji, who was later killed in battle, and the throne passed to his eldest son, Jasoji. Jam Rawal conquered parts of Saurashtra and formed his kingdom.

Once on a hunting trip on the land of present day Jamnagar, a hare was found to be brave enough to turn on the hunting dogs and putting them to flight. Deeply impressed by this, Jam Rawal thought that if this land can breed such hares, the men born here would be superior than other men, and accordingly made this place his capital. On the 7th day of the bright half of the month of Srawan, VS 1596 (August 1540 AD) on the banks of two rivers Rangmati and Nagmati, he lay the foundation of his new capital and named it Nawanagar (new town). Nawanagar eventually came to be known as Jamnagar meaning the town of the Jams.

== Geography ==
Jamnagar district lies between 22°13’N and 69°42’E in the region of Gujarat popularly referred to as Saurashtra. The Gulf of Kutch lies to the north of Jamnagar district and the Arabian Sea on the west. In the east lies the Rajkot district and the Junagadh district is to the south. The city has a hot dry climate for most of the year with extreme hot summers during March–May when the temperatures reach an average of 40 °C. The winter season begins from October and ends in February with average temperatures around 30 °C. June–September is the monsoon with frequent occurrences of tropical storms. The best time to visit Jamnagar is between October and February. Geologists have often debated on the exact origins of Jamnagar but deduce that the district was probably an island or a group of islands with volcanic sites.

== Talukas (administrative divisions) ==
1. Jam Jodhpur
2. Jodiya
3. Dhrol
4. Jamnagar
5. Jamnagar Rural
6. Lalpur
7. Kalavad Taluka

== Transport ==
There are many private bus service providers with coaches running between Jamnagar and Bhuj, Ahmedabad, Surat, Vadodara, Mumbai, Pune, and other major cities. State Transport has bus services to almost all cities of Gujarat State and interstate transport facilities. The Jamnagar Municipal Corporation runs local buses. Also, Ola Cabs and auto rickshaws are available.

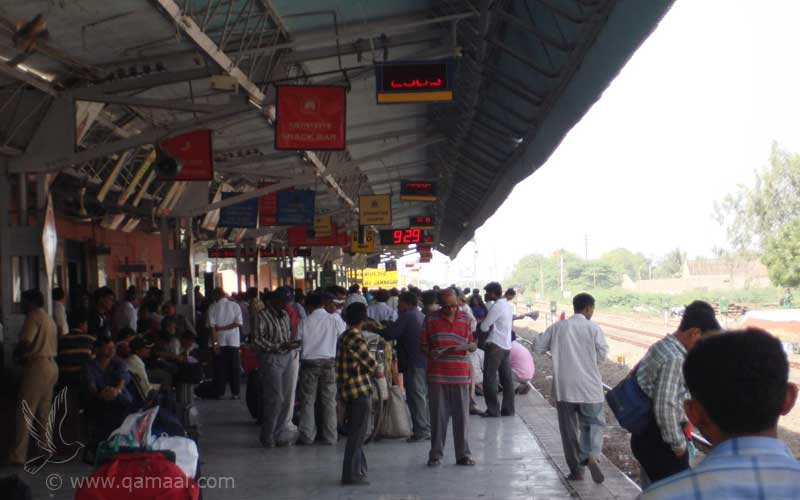
Jamnagar Railway Station platform

Jamnagar has a railway station connected with a variety of India's destinations. Four daily trains go to Mumbai and weekly trains to the major cities to the north, east, and south of the country.

The city has an airport with a daily direct flight to Mumbai and thrice-in-a-week flights to Hyderabad and Bengaluru. The airport is within a military enclave of the Indian Air Force.

=== Amritsar–Jamnagar Expressway(NH-754) ===
Amritsar–Jamnagar Expressway(NH-754) is an under-construction 1,257 km long, 6-lane wide expressway in the north-western part of India. The expressway will reduce the distance between Amritsar and Jamnagar from earlier 1,430 km to 1,316 km (including Kapurthala-Amritsar section) and the time travel from 26 hours to only 13 hours. It is a part of the Bharatmala and Amritsar–Jamnagar Economic Corridor (EC-3). It will pass through four states of Punjab, Haryana, Rajasthan and Gujarat.

The expressway is strategically important, as it will connect 3 big oil refineries of HMEL Bathinda, HPCL Barmer and Reliance Industries Limited(RIL) Jamnagar. It will also connect Guru Nanak Dev Thermal Plant (Bathinda) and Suratgarh Super Thermal Power Plant (Sri Ganganagar).

The expressway will meet the Ludhiana-Bathinda-Ajmer Expressway of the Pathankot–Ajmer Economic Corridor at Bathinda. The construction work on the expressway started in Haryana and Rajasthan in 2019. The Rajasthan section of the expressway from Jakhrawali in Hanumangarh district to Khetlawas in Jalore district was completed in early 2023 and was inaugurated by Prime Minister Narendra Modi on 8 July 2023, while the entire expressway is expected to be opened by September 2023.

=== Utilities ===
The Sikka Thermal Power Station is a coal-fired power station near Jamnagar. Various cable operators like GTPL are available in the city, along with DTH services from Tata Play, Airtel, DishTV, and Videocon D2H. Bharat Sanchar Nigam Limited (BSNL) provides broadband. Reliance has started its 5G service, Reliance Jio. All mobile operators are available in Jamnagar, including Vi, Airtel, Reliance, BSNL.

=== Wildlife conservation centre ===
Vantara, a large-scale animal rescue centre is located in Jamnagar. It is a rescue, conservation and rehabilitation centre, established by Reliance Industries with Reliance Foundation. It is located within the Reliance Jamnagar Refinery Complex in Jamnagar, Gujarat, India. The 3,000-acre sanctuary focuses on animal welfare and conservation. It was initiated by Anant Ambani, director on the boards of Reliance Industries and Reliance Foundation. Vantara was officially inaugurated by Indian prime minister Narendra Modi on 4 March 2025.

== Demographics ==
Historical population
Year	Pop.	±% p.a.
1901	352,150	—
1911	359,604	+0.21%
1921	359,631	+0.00%
1931	425,463	+1.70%
1941	517,833	+1.98%
1951	616,896	+1.77%
1961	828,419	+2.99%
1971	1,111,343	+2.98%
1981	1,393,076	+2.29%
1991	1,563,558	+1.16%
2001	1,904,278	+1.99%
2011	2,160,119	+1.27%

According to the 2023 estimated population of Jamnagar district is 2,516,000, roughly equal to the nation of Namibia or the US state of New Mexico. This gives it a district population ranking of 87th in India (out of a total of 640). The district has a population density of 153 inhabitants per square kilometre (400/sq mi) . Its population growth rate over the decade 2011–2023 was 16.48%. Jamnagar has a sex ratio of 938 females for every 1000 males. It had literacy rate of 66.4% in 2001 which rose impressively in a decade to literacy rate of 74.4% by 2011.

According to 2023 estimate population, the divided district had a population of 2,516,000, of which 6,68,000 lived in city areas. The residual district had a sex ratio of 939 females per 1000 males. Total male population is 1,297,811 and female population is 1,218,296.

Religions in Jamnagar district (2023)
Religion	Percent
Hinduism	83.81%
Islam	14.85%
Jainism	0.87%
Other or not stated	0.47%

In the residual district, Hindus were 2,108,804 (83.81), Muslims were 373,674 (14.85) and Jains 21,963 (0.87%).

=== Language ===
Languages of Jamnagar district (2011)
1. Gujarati (89.8%)
2. Kachchhi (5.84%)
3. Hindi (2.24%)
4. Sindhi (0.44%)
5. Urdu (0.36%)
6. Marathi (0.24%)
7. Others (1.13%)

At the time of the 2011 census, 89.75% of the population spoke Gujarati, 5.84% Kachchhi and 2.24% Hindi as their first language.

== Politics ==
District	No.	Constituency	Name	Party		Remarks
Jamnagar	76	Kalavad (SC)	Meghji Chavda			
Jamnagar	77	Jamnagar Rural	Raghavji Patel	Cabinet Minister		
Jamnagar	78	Jamnagar North	Rivaba Jadeja			
Jamnagar	79	Jamnagar South	Divyesh Akbari			
Jamnagar	80	Jamjodhpur	Hemant Khava		Aam Aadmi Party	AAP Deputy LP Leader

== See also ==
- Halar
- Jamnagar
