= India in World War II =

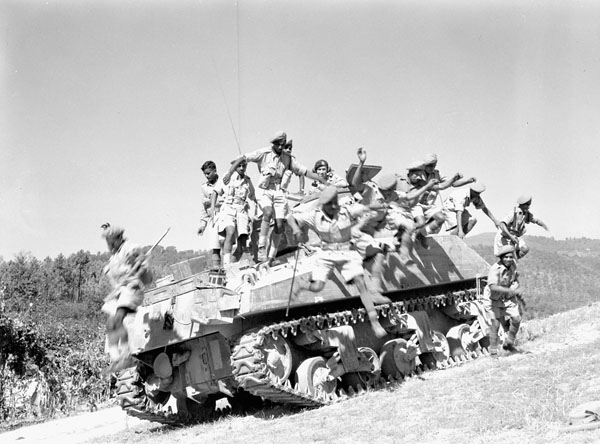
Infantrymen of the 1/5 Maratha Light Infantry during training, Florence, Italy, 28 August 1944

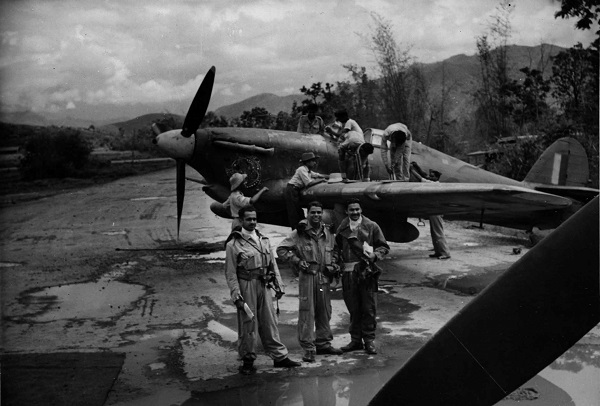
Indian Airforce Pilots after a mission during the Burma Campaign

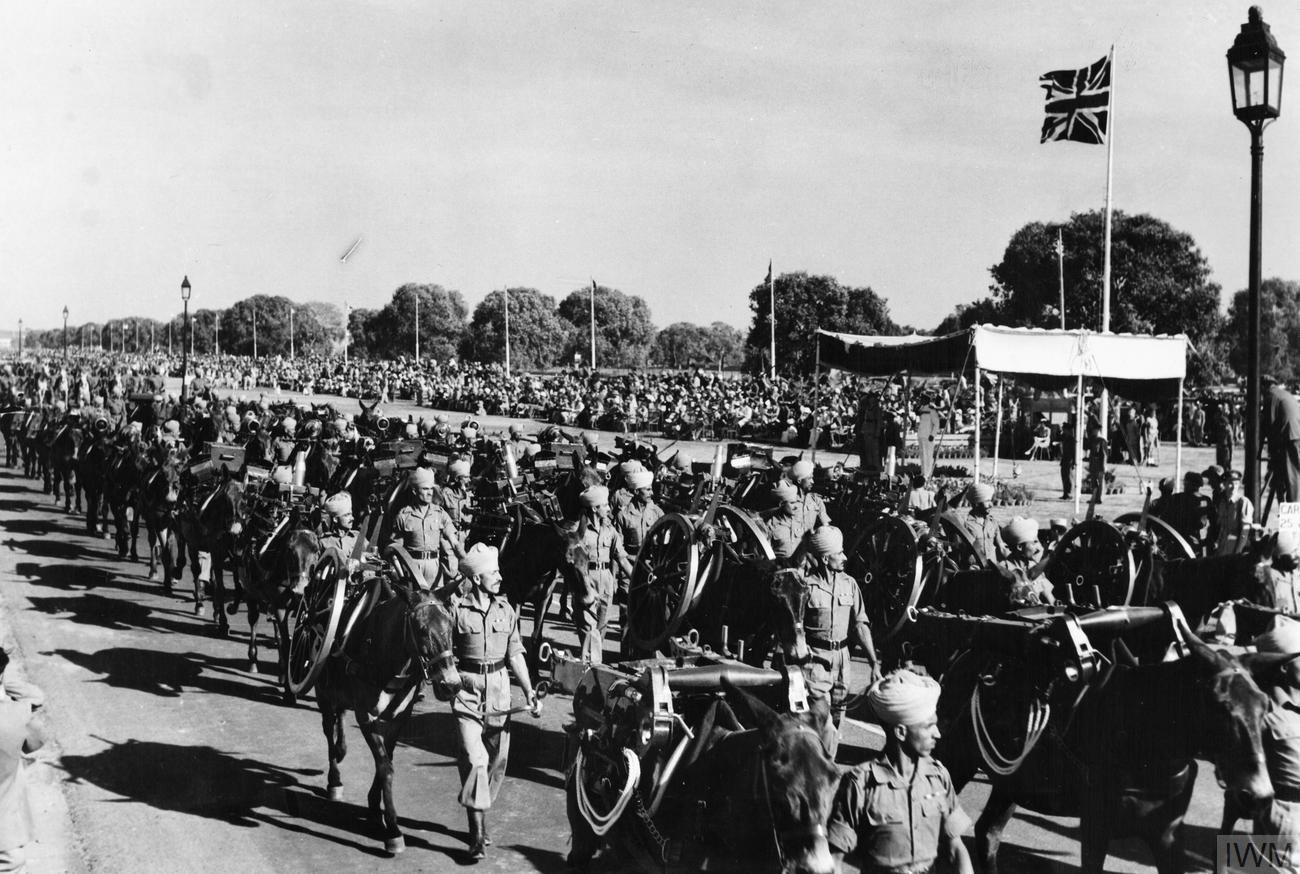
Victory Week Parade in Delhi to celebrate the final defeat of the Axis powers, March 1946.

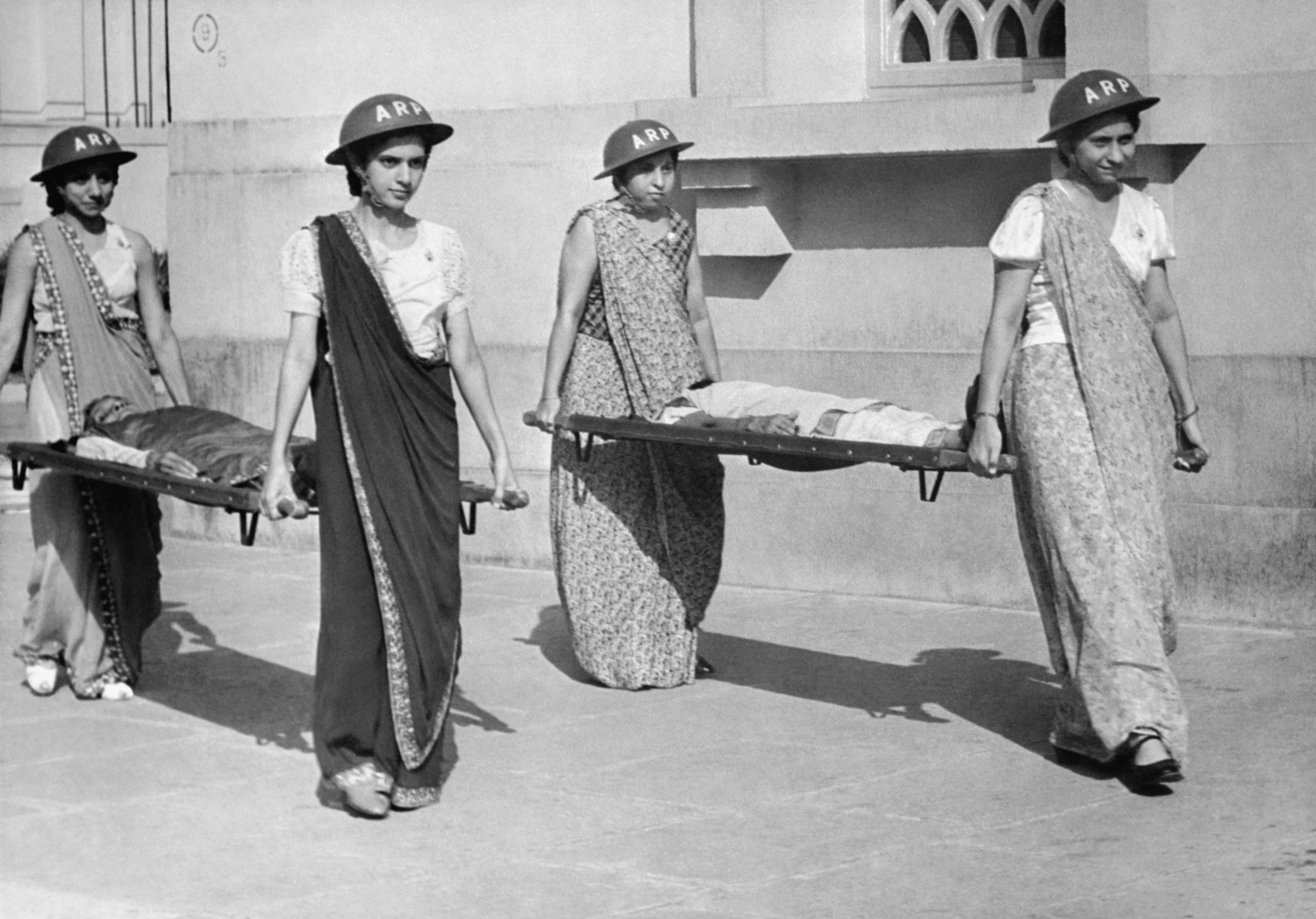
Indian women training for air raid precautions (ARP) duties in Bombay, 1942.

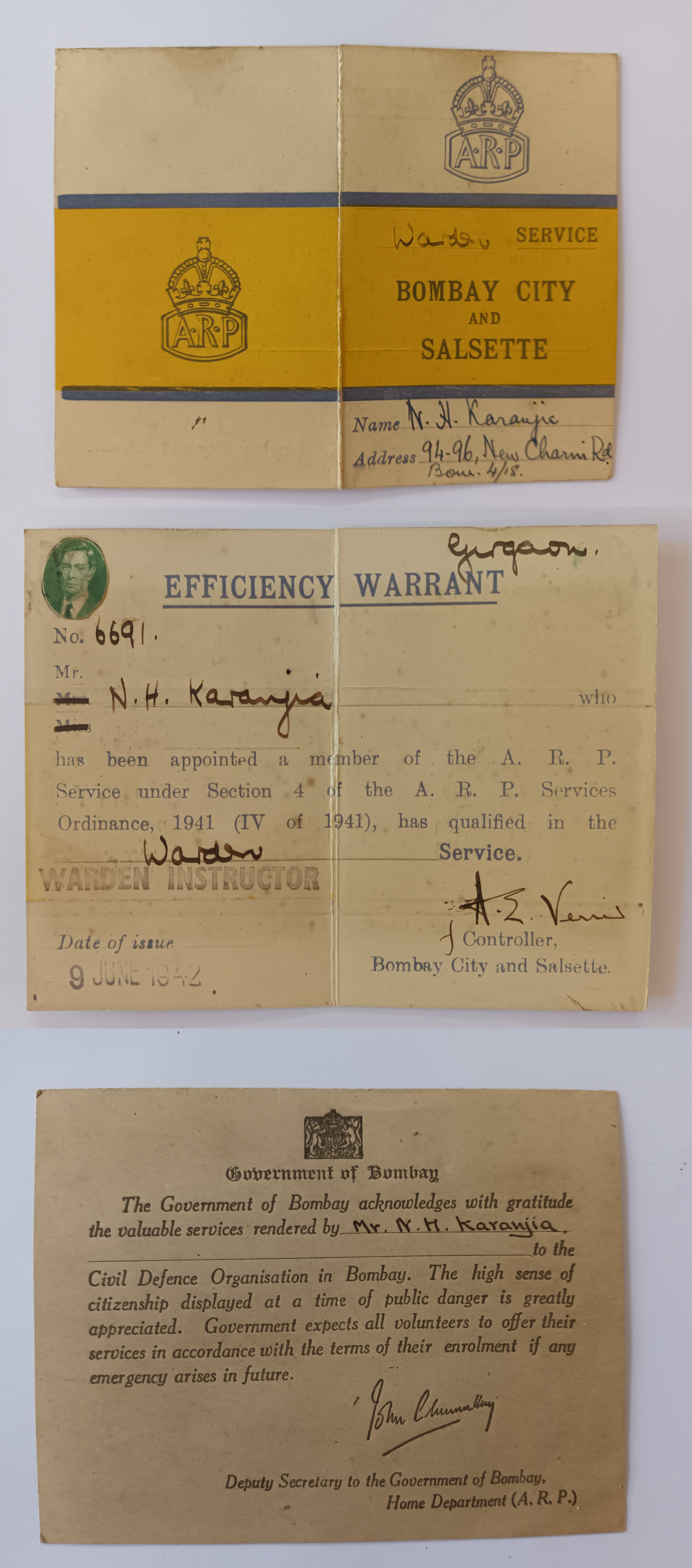
ARP Warden Service Efficiency Warrant issued to NH Karanjia, Bombay, June 1942 with Acknowledgement of Gratitude Card

During the Second World War (1939–1945), India was a part of the British Empire. British India officially declared war on Nazi Germany in September 1939. India, as a part of the Allied Nations, sent over two and a half million soldiers to fight under British command against the Axis powers. India was also used as the base for American operations in support of China in the China Burma India Theater.

Indians fought throughout the world, including in the European theatre against Germany, North African Campaign against fascist Italy, and in the southeast Asian theatre; while also defending the Indian subcontinent against the Japanese forces, including British Burma and the Crown colony of Ceylon. Indian troops were also redeployed in former colonies such as Singapore and Hong Kong, with the Japanese surrender in August 1945, after the end of World War II. Over 87,000 Indian troops, and 3 million civilians died in World War II. Field Marshal Sir Claude Auchinleck, former Commander-in-Chief, India, stated that Britain "couldn't have come through both wars [World War I and II] if they hadn't had the Indian Army."

There was pushback throughout India to expending lives supporting the colonial British Empire in Africa and Europe amidst movements for Indian independence. Particularly, Subhas Chandra Bose sought alliance with the Soviet Union and then ultimately with Nazi Germany as a tool for subverting the British empire. Many factions of the Indian Independence Movement did support Nazi Germany during the war, most notably the so-called Indian Legion which Bose was instrumental in creating and which was incorporated for some time as a division of the Waffen-SS.

The Marquess of Linlithgow, Viceroy of India, declared war on Germany on India's behalf in September 1939, an action for which he was criticised by elements of the Indian National Congress for not consulting the Indian people. Political parties such as the Muslim League and the Hindu Mahasabha supported the British war effort while the largest and most influential political party existing in India at the time, the Indian National Congress, demanded independence before it would help Britain. London refused, and when Congress announced a "Quit India" campaign in August 1942, tens of thousands of its leaders were imprisoned by the British for the duration. Meanwhile, under the leadership of Indian leader Subhas Chandra Bose, Japan set up an army of Indian POWs known as the Indian National Army which fought against the British. In 1943, a major famine in Bengal led to between 0.8 and 3.8 million deaths due to starvation, and a highly controversial issue remains regarding Winston Churchill's decision not to provide emergency food relief.

Indian participation in the Allied campaign remained strong. The financial, industrial and military assistance of India formed a crucial component of the British campaign against Nazi Germany and Imperial Japan. India's strategic location at the tip of the Indian Ocean, its large production of armaments, and its huge armed forces played a decisive role in halting the progress of Imperial Japan in the South-East Asian theatre. The Indian Army during World War II was one of the largest Allied forces contingents which took part in the North and East African Campaign, Western Desert Campaign. At the height of the second World War, more than 2.5 million Indian troops were fighting Axis forces around the globe. After the end of the war, India emerged as the world's fourth largest industrial power and its increased political, economic and military influence paved the way for its independence from the United Kingdom in 1947. The Indian servicemen who served in the British Indian Army, the Royal Indian Navy, and the Indian Air Force during World War II and still had service period remaining at the time of India's Independence would go on to become serving members of the future armies, navies, and air forces of post-Partition India and Pakistan.

== Quit India movement ==
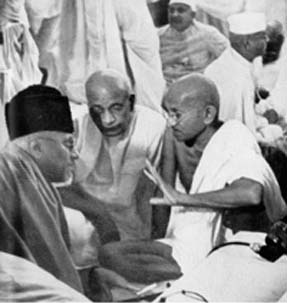
Prominent Indian leaders, including Gandhi, Patel and Maulana Azad, denounced Nazism as well as British imperialism.

The Indian National Congress, led by Mohandas Karamchand Gandhi, Vallabhbhai Patel and Maulana Azad, denounced Nazi Germany but would not fight it or anyone else until India was independent. Congress launched the Quit India Movement in August 1942, refusing to co-operate in any way with the government until independence was granted. The government, not ready for this, immediately arrested over 60,000 national and local Congress leaders, and then moved to suppress the violent reaction of Congress supporters. Key leaders were kept in prison until June 1945, although Gandhi was released in May 1944 because of his health. Congress, with its leaders incommunicado, played little role on the home front. Unlike the predominately Hindu Congress, the Muslim League rejected the Quit India movement and worked closely with the Raj authorities.

Supporters of the British Raj argued that decolonisation was impossible in the middle of a great war. So, in 1939, the British Viceroy, Lord Linlithgow declared India's entry into the War without consulting prominent Indian Congress leaders who were just elected in previous elections.

Subhas Chandra Bose (also called Netaji) had been a top Congress leader. He broke up with the Congress and tried to form a military alliance with Germany or Japan to gain independence. Bose, with the assistance of Germany, formed the Indian Legion from Indian students in Axis occupied Europe and Indian Army prisoners of war. With German reversals in 1942 and 1943, Bose and the Legion's officers were transported by U boat to Japanese territory to continue his plans. Upon arrival, Japan helped him set up the Indian National Army (INA) which fought under Japanese direction, mostly in the Burma Campaign. Bose also headed the Provisional Government of Free India, a government-in-exile based in Singapore. It controlled no Indian territory and was used only to raise troops for Japan.

== British Indian Army ==
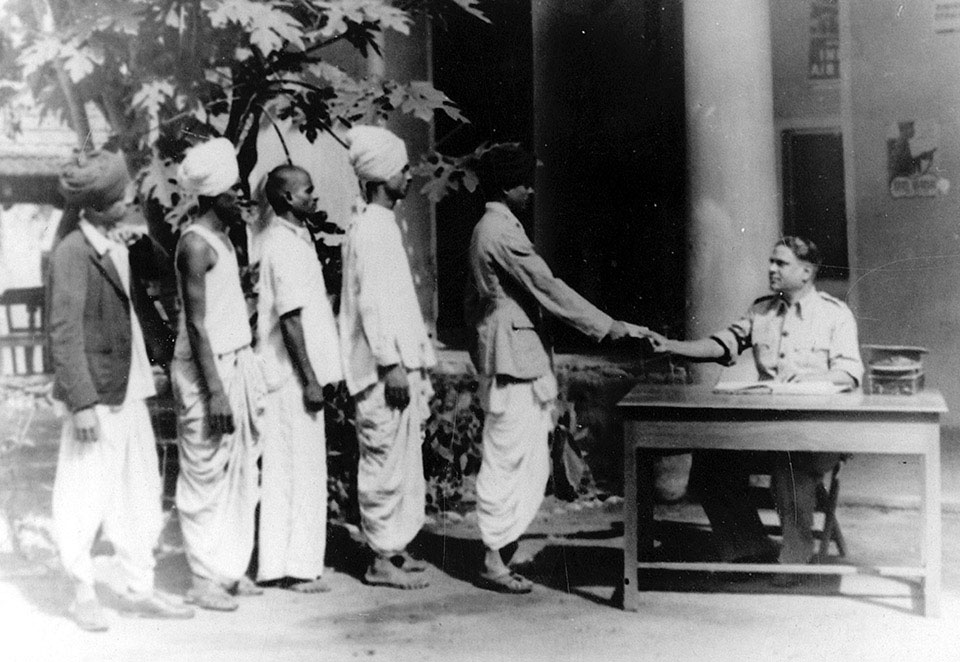
Recruits line up to enlist with the 5th Mahratta Light Infantry, 1943.

In 1939 the British Indian Army numbered 205,000 men. It took in volunteers and by 1945 was the largest all-volunteer force in history, rising to over 3.35 million men. These forces included tank, artillery and airborne forces.

Over World War II, officers and soldiers of the British Indian Army received 6,000 awards for gallantry. These included a total of 31 Victoria Crosses, the highest award in British and Commonwealth Forces for operational gallantry. British, Indian, Nepalese as well as future Pakistani soldiers and officers of the British Indian Army taken together account for these Victoria Crosses, as well for the other thousands of gallantry awards attributed to the British Indian Army. Indians were also awarded the George Cross, the highest award for non-operational gallantry and equivalent to the Victoria Cross. Significantly, in World War II, several Indian officers also received the Distinguished Service Order (DSO). The DSO was a level 2A order-cum-decoration, second only to the Victoria Cross, that could be bestowed only upon commissioned officers for operational gallantry and leadership under conditions of actual combat. The DSO became available to Indian officers largely following the gradual Indianisation of the officer ranks of the British Indian Army 1923 onwards. A rare exception was Hiraji Cursetji, an Indian military surgeon who was awarded the DSO during World War I. Level 3A decorations awarded to Indian officers in World War II included the Distinguished Service Cross (DSC), the Military Cross (MC), and the Distinguished Flying Cross (DFC). Other high military recognitions included appointments as officers or members of the Order of the British Empire (shortened as OBE and MBE respectively), both of which ranked below the DSO but above the level 3A decorations.

=== South-East Asian theatre ===
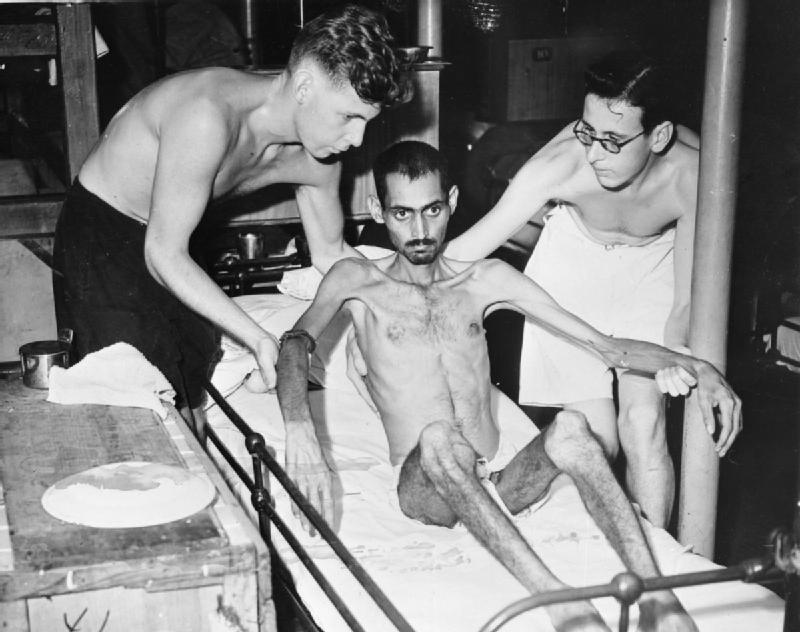
An Indian prisoner of war from Hong Kong after liberation in 1945.

The British Indian Army was the key British Empire fighting presence in the Burma Campaign. The Royal Indian Air force's first assault mission was carried out against Japanese troops stationed in Burma. The British Indian Army was key to breaking the siege of Imphal when the westward advance of Imperial Japan came to a halt.

The formations included the Indian III Corps, IV Corps, the Indian XXXIII Corps and the Fourteenth Army. As part of the new concept of Long Range Penetration (LRP), Gurkha troops of the Indian Army were trained in the present state of Madhya Pradesh under their commander (later Major General) Orde Charles Wingate.

These troops, popularly known as Chindits, played a crucial role in halting the Japanese advance into South Asia.

==== Capture of Indian territory ====
By 1942, neighbouring Burma was invaded by Japan, which by then had already captured the Indian territory of Andaman and Nicobar Islands. Japan gave nominal control of the islands to the Provisional Government of Free India on 21 October 1943, and in the following March, the Indian National Army with the help of Japan crossed into India and advanced as far as Kohima in Nagaland. This advance on the mainland of South Asia reached its farthest point on Indian territory, with the Japanese finally retreating from the Battle of Kohima and near simultaneous Battle of Imphal in June 1944.

==== Recapture of Axis-occupied territory ====
In 1944–45, Japan was under heavy air bombardment at home and suffered massive naval defeats in the Pacific. As its Imphal offensive failed, harsh weather and disease and withdrawal of air cover (due to more pressing needs in the Pacific) also took its toll on the Japanese and remnants of the INA and the Burma National Army. In spring 1945, a resurgent British army recaptured the occupied lands.

==== Notable Indian recipients of gallantry awards ====
For the highest gallantry in the South East Asian theatre, the Victoria Cross was awarded to Fazal Din, Abdul Hafiz, Karamjeet Judge, Ganju Lama, Bhandari Ram, Sher Shah, Gian Singh, Nand Singh, Parkash Singh, Prakash Singh Chib, Ram Sarup Singh, and Umrao Singh. In the same theatre, the George Cross was awarded to Mateen Ansari, Islam-ud-Din, Abdul Rahman, and Mahmood Khan Durrani (future Pakistan Army officer).

For their gallant leadership and personal bravery in different battles during the Burma Campaign, the DSO was awarded to Kondandera Subayya Thimayya (future COAS, Indian Army), Lionel Protip Sen (future CGS, Indian Army), S.P.P. Thorat (future CGS, Indian Army), Harbans Singh Virk, and Sarbjit Singh Kalha. Siri Kanth Korla, a future division commander of the Indian Army during the 1965 Indo-Pakistani War, was awarded the DSO, the MC, and two Mentions in Dispatches for gallantry in different episodes of this Campaign. The Indian DSO winners in Burma also included Akbar Khan, future leader of Pakistani irregular forces in the Indo-Pakistani War of 1947-48 as well as a future CGS, Pakistani Army.

Gurbakhsh Singh was awarded the DSO and appointed as an OBE for leading a contingent the British Indian Army in Japanese captivity in Singapore, and for preventing defection of his men to the Indian National Army during this internment. Abrar Hussain, a future divisional commander of the Pakistan Army in the 1965 Indo-Pakistani war, was appointed as an MBE for a similar feat with interned personnel of the 2/10 Baluch in Singapore.

K.M. Cariappa, the future second Field Marshal of the Indian Army, was appointed as an OBE for non-combat service in this theatre.

Miyan Hayaud Din, another future CGS, Pakistan Army, was appointed as MBE and awarded the MC for his actions in Burma.

Sam Manekshaw (the future first Field Marshal of the Indian Army) and A.A.K. Niazi, who would go on to lead the Indian and Pakistani armies respectively during the 1971 Indo-Pakistani War, were both awarded the MC in the Burma Campaign. Naveen Chand Rawlley, future VCOAS, Indian Army, was also awarded the MC in Burma.

=== Middle East and African theatre ===
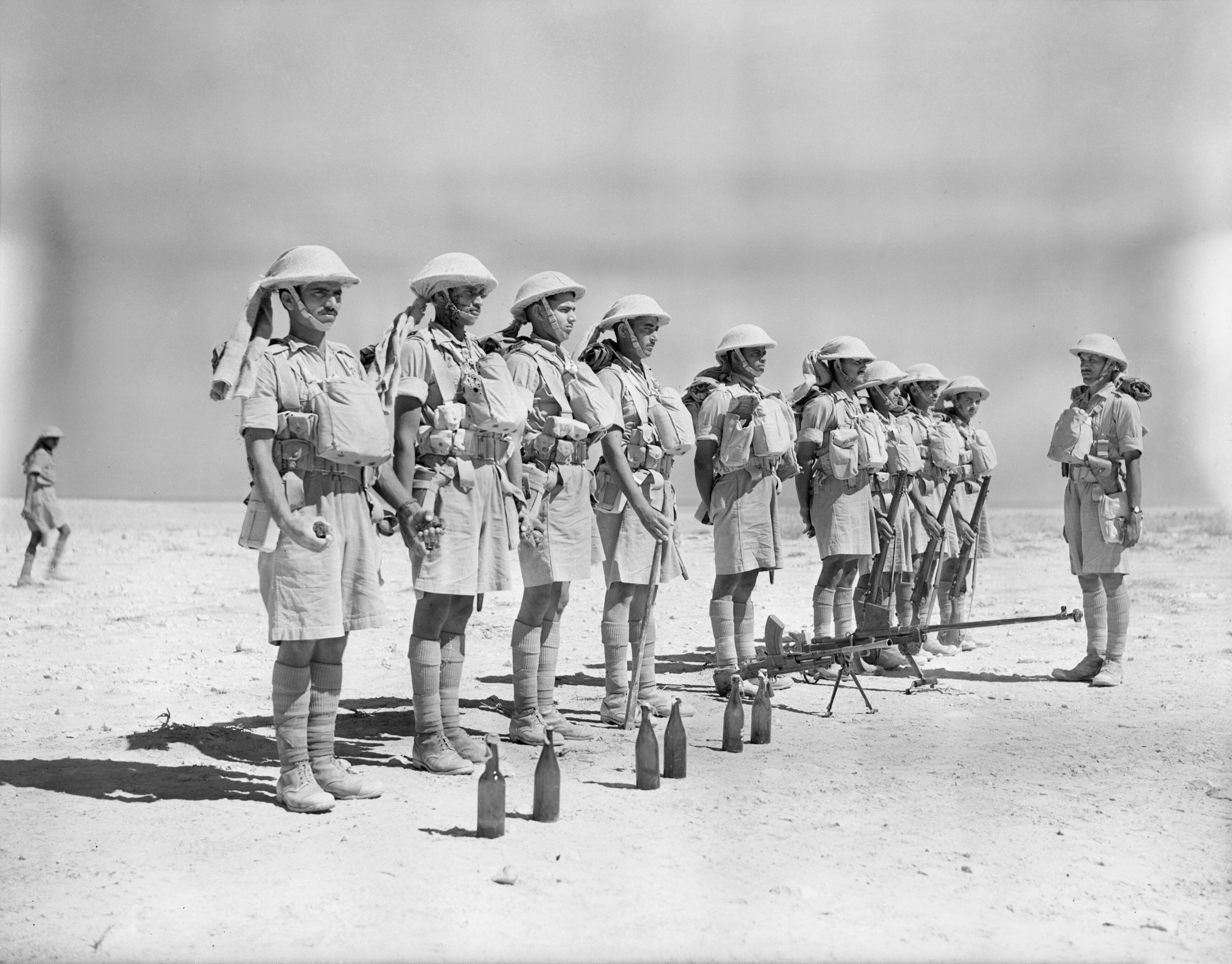
Indian troops in North Africa, 6 October 1940.

The British government meanwhile sent Indian troops to fight in West Asia and northern Africa against the Axis. India also geared up to produce essential goods such as food and uniforms.

The 4th, 5th and 10th Indian Divisions took part in the North African theatre against Rommel's Afrika Korps. In addition, the 18th Indian Infantry Brigade of the 8th Indian Division fought against the Afrika Korps at Deir el-Shein. Although they were overrun, they bought valuable time for the rest of the British 8th Army to prepare the defences for what was to be the First Battle of El Alamein, halting the German advance in Egypt. Earlier, the 4th and 5th Indian Divisions took part in the East African campaign against the Italians in Somaliland, Eritrea and Abyssinia capturing the mountain fortress of Keren. In the Battle of Bir Hakeim, Indian gunners played an important role by using guns in the anti tank role and destroying tanks of Rommel's panzer divisions.

Indian units also took part in the Anglo-Iraqi War, Syria-Lebanon campaign, and Anglo-Soviet invasion of Iran.

==== Notable Indian recipients of gallantry awards ====
Premindra Singh Bhagat (future co-author of the Henderson Brooks - Bhagat report), Richhpal Ram, and Chhelu Ram were awarded the Victoria Cross in the Middle East and African Theatre.

PP Kumaramangalam and Rajendrasinjhi Jadeja (both future COAS, Indian Army), and Vidya Dhar Jayal, a future brigade commander of the Indian Army during the 1947-48 Indo-Pakistani War, were awarded the DSO in this theatre.

Jayanto Nath Chaudhari, future COAS, Indian Army, was appointed as an OBE for gallant service in the Middle East.

Muhammad Musa (future head of the Pakistani Army during the 1965 Indo-Pakistani war) was appointed as an MBE for his action in the Middle East.

=== Invasion of Italy ===
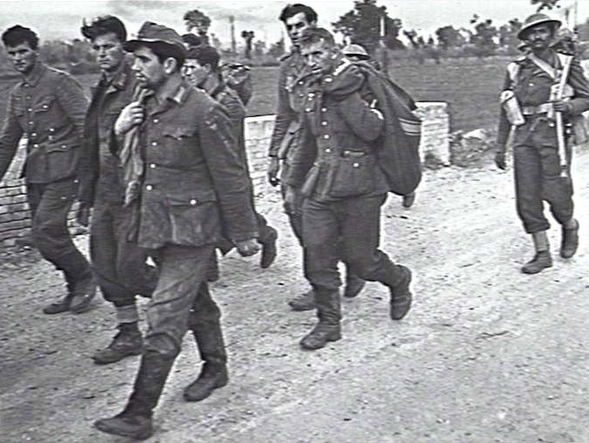
German prisoners being escorted by Indian troops after the Battle of the Sangro, Italy, December 1943.

Indian forces played a role in liberating Italy from Nazi control. India contributed the third largest Allied contingent in the Italian campaign after US and British forces. The 4th, 8th and 10th Divisions and 43rd Gurkha Infantry Brigade led the advance, notably at the gruelling Battle of Monte Cassino. They fought on the Gothic Line in 1944 and 1945.

==== Notable Indian recipients of gallantry awards ====
Yashwant Ghadge, Namdeo Jadhav, Kamal Ram, and Ali Haider (future Pakistani Army officer) were awarded the Victoria Cross during the Invasion of Italy. Subramaniam and Ditto Ram were awarded the George Cross for actions in Italy.

Thakur Mahadeo Singh, future first native commandant of the Indian Military Academy, was awarded the DSO for actions in Italy.

Kashmir Singh Katoch, future VCOAS, Indian Army, was awarded the MC in Italy. Bakhtiar Rana, future corps commander of the Pakistan Army in West Pakistan during the 1965 Indo-Pakistan War, was also awarded the MC in this theatre.

== Royal Indian Air Force ==
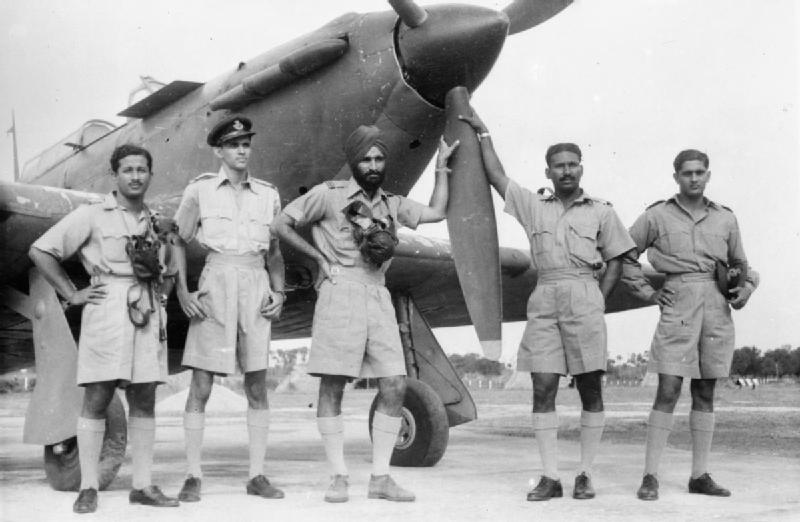
World War II photo: Arjan Singh (middle) as Flight Lieutenant. He went on to become Marshal of the Air Force.

During World War II, the IAF played an instrumental role in halting the advance of the Imperial Japanese Army in Burma, where the first IAF air strike was executed. The target for this first mission was the Japanese military base in Arakan, after which IAF strike missions continued against the Japanese airbases at Mae Hong Son, Chiang Mai and Chiang Rai in northern Thailand.

The IAF was mainly involved in strike, close air support, aerial reconnaissance, bomber escort and pathfinding missions for RAF and USAAF heavy bombers. RAF and IAF pilots would train by flying with their non-native air wings to gain combat experience and communication proficiency. Besides operations in the Burma Theatre IAF pilots participated in air operations in North Africa and Europe.

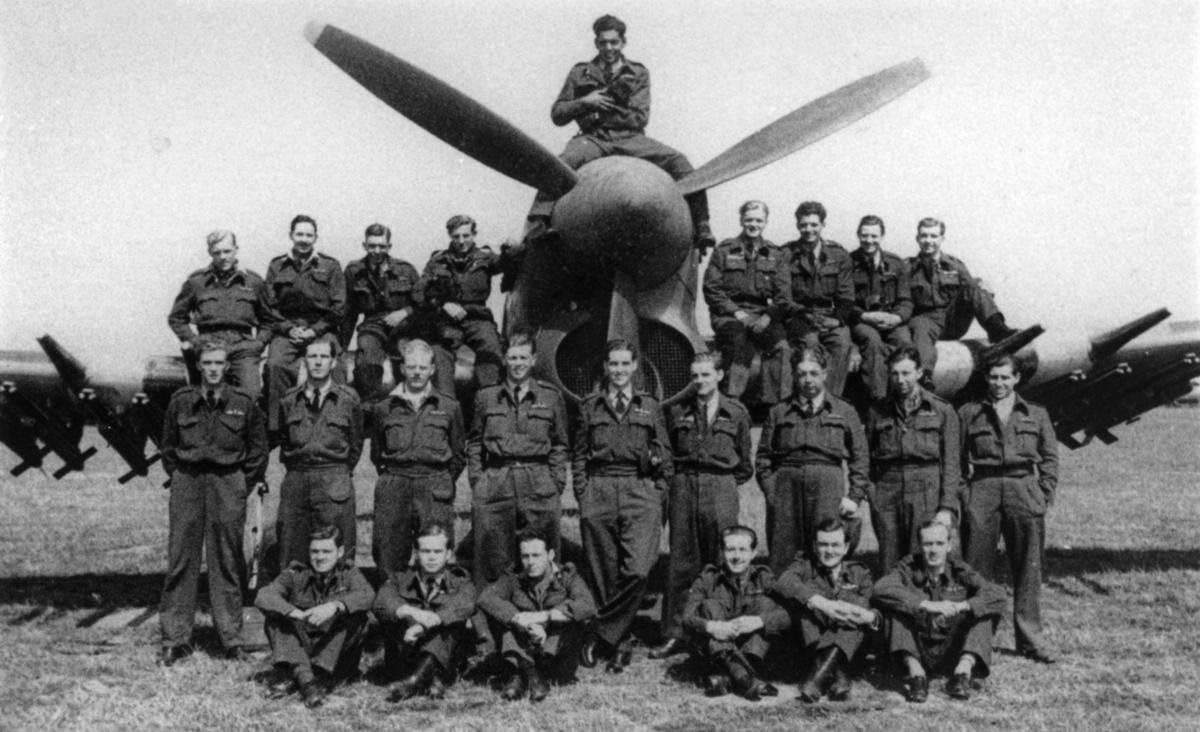
Pilots of No. 263 Squadron pose in front of their Typhoon. Pilot Officer Thyagarajan, an Indian pilot is seated on the engine cowling

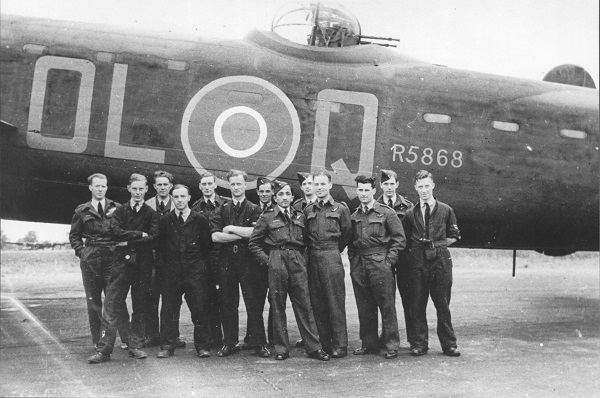
83 Squadron aircrew in front of their Lancaster R5868, Squadron Leader Shailendra Eknath Sukthankar, an Indian Navigator stands in the middle.

During the war, the IAF experienced a phase of steady expansion. Many Indian airmen in the Royal Air Force were seconded or transferred to the expanding IAF. New aircraft added to the fleet included the US-built Vultee Vengeance, Douglas Dakota, the British Hawker Hurricane, Supermarine Spitfire, Bristol Blenheim, and Westland Lysander.

Subhas Chandra Bose sent Indian National Army youth cadets to Japan to train as pilots. They went on to attend the Imperial Japanese Army Air Force Academy in 1944.

In recognition of the valiant service by the IAF, King George VI conferred the prefix "Royal" in 1945. Thereafter the IAF was referred to as the Royal Indian Air Force. In 1950, when India became a republic, the prefix was dropped and it reverted to being the Indian Air Force.

Post war, No. 4 Squadron IAF was sent to Japan as part of the Allied Occupation forces.

=== Notable Indian recipients of gallantry awards ===
In addition to the IAF, many native Indians and some 200 Indians resident in Britain volunteered to join the RAF and Women's Auxiliary Air Force (WAAF). One such officer volunteer was Assistant Section Officer Noor Inayat Khan, a pacifist of Indian origin who joined the WAAF, in November 1940, to fight against Nazism. Noor Khan served bravely as a secret agent with the Special Operations Executive (SOE) in France, but was eventually betrayed, captured, and executed by the Nazis. She was posthumously awarded the George Cross.

Mehar Singh, Indian flying prodigy, was awarded the DSO for his actions in Burma.

Karun Krishna Majumdar, the first Indian to reach the rank of Wing Commander, was awarded the DFC & bar. Arjan Singh (future Marshal of the Indian Air Force), Pratap Chandra Lal (future chief of the IAF during Indo-Pakistani War of 1971), and Ramaswamy Rajaram (future VCAS, IAF) were awarded the DFC in Burma. The brothers Aspy Engineer and Minoo Merwam Engineer, who both later became Air Marshals of the IAF, were also awarded the DFC.

== Royal Indian Navy ==
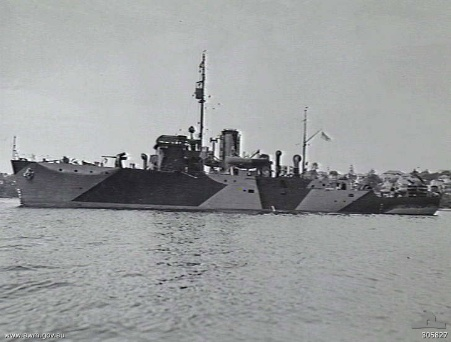
HMIS Bombay in Sydney Harbour, 1942.

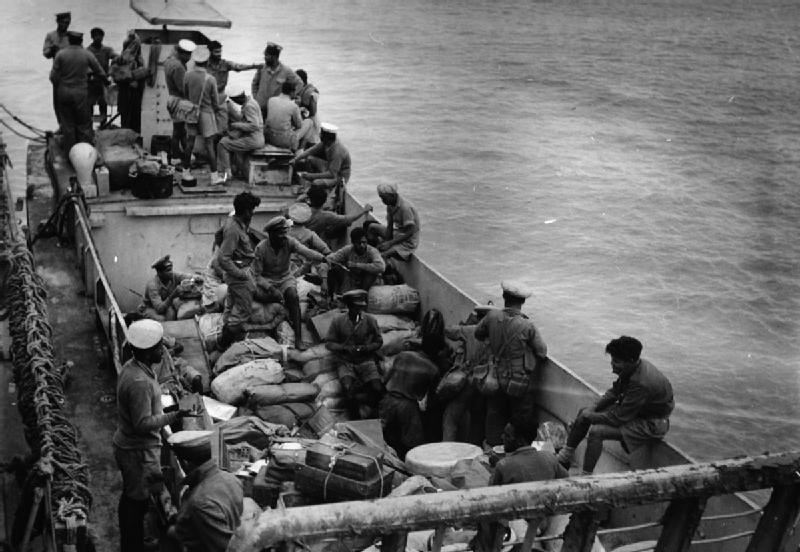
Royal Indian Naval personnel on board a landing craft during combined operations off Myebon, Burma, January 1945.

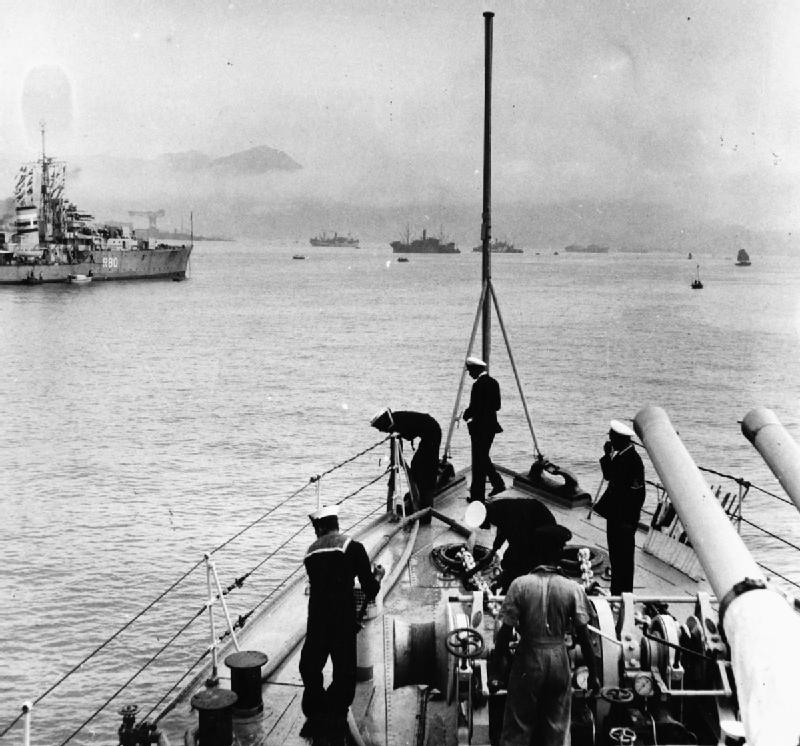
HMIS Sutlej leaves Hong Kong for Japan as part of the Allied forces of occupation.

In 1934, the Royal Indian Marine changed its name, with the enactment of the Indian Navy (Discipline) Act of 1934. The Royal Indian Navy was formally inaugurated on 2 October 1934, at Bombay. Its ships carried the prefix HMIS, for His Majesty's Indian Ship.

At the start of the Second World War, the Royal Indian Navy was small, with only eight warships. The onset of the war led to an expansion in vessels and personnel described by one writer as "phenomenal". By 1943 the strength of the RIN had reached twenty thousand. During the War, the Women's Royal Indian Naval Service was established, for the first time giving women a role in the navy, although they did not serve on board its ships.

During the course of the war six anti-aircraft sloops and several fleet minesweepers were built in the United Kingdom for the R.I.N. After commissioning, many of these ships joined various escort groups operating in the northern approaches to the British Isles. HMIS Sutlej and HMIS Jumna, each armed with six-high angle 4" guns, were present during the Clyde "Blitz" of 1941 and assisted the defence of this area by providing anti-aircraft cover. For the next six months these two ships joined the Clyde Escort Force, operating in the Atlantic and later the Irish Sea Escort Force where they acted as the senior ships of the groups. While engaged on these duties, numerous attacks against U-boats were carried out and attacks by hostile aircraft repelled. At the time of action in which the Bismarck was involved, the Sutlej left Scapa Flow, with all despatch as the senior member of a group, to take over a convoy from the destroyers which were finally engaged in the sinking of the Bismarck.

Later HMIS Cauvery, HMIS Kistna, HMIS Narbada, HMIS Godavari, also antiaircraft sloops, completed similar periods in the U.K. waters escorting convoys in the Atlantic and dealing with attacks from hostile U-boats, aircraft and glider bombs. These six ships and the minesweepers all eventually proceeded to India carrying out various duties in the North Atlantic, Mediterranean and Cape stations en route. The fleet minesweepers were HMIS Kathiawar, HMIS Kumaon, HMIS Baluchistan, HMIS Carnatic, HMIS Khyber, HMIS Konkan, HMIS Orissa, HMIS Rajputana, HMIS Rohilkhand.

HMIS Bengal was a part of the Eastern Fleet during World War II, and escorted numerous convoys between 1942 and 1945.

The sloops HMIS Sutlej and HMIS Jumna played a role in Operation Husky, the Allied invasion of Sicily by providing air defence and anti-submarine screening to the invasion fleet.

Furthermore, the Royal Indian Navy participated in convoy escort duties in the Indian Ocean and Mediterranean and was heavily involved in combat operations as part of the Burma Campaign, carrying out raids, shore bombardment, naval invasion support and other activities culminating in Operation Dracula and the mopping up operations during the final stages of the war.

=== Royal Indian Naval combat losses ===
The sloop HMIS Pathan sunk in June 1940 by the Italian Navy Submarine Galvani during the East African Campaign

In the days immediately following the Attack on Pearl Harbor, HMS Glasgow was patrolling the Laccadive Islands in search of Japanese ships and submarines. At midnight on 9 December 1941, HMS Glasgow sank the RIN patrol vessel HMIS Prabhavati with two lighters in tow en route to Karachi, with 6-inch shells at 6,000 yards (5,500 m). Prabhavati was alongside the lighters and was mistaken for a surfaced Japanese submarine.

HMIS Indus was sunk by Japanese aircraft during Burma Campaign on 6 April 1942.

=== Royal Indian Naval successes ===
HMIS Jumna was ordered in 1939, and built by William Denny and Brothers. She was commissioned in 1941, and with World War II underway, was immediately deployed as a convoy escort. Jumna served as an anti-aircraft escort during the Java Sea campaign in early 1942, and was involved in intensive anti-aircraft action against attacking Japanese twin-engined level bombers and dive bombers, claiming five aircraft downed from 24 to 28 February 1942.

In June 1942 HMIS Bombay was involved in the defence of Sydney Harbour during the attack on Sydney Harbour.

On 11 November 1942, Bengal was escorting the Dutch tanker Ondina to the southwest of Cocos Islands in the Indian Ocean. Two Japanese commerce raiders armed with six-inch guns attacked Ondina. Bengal fired her single four-inch gun and Ondina fired her 102 mm and both scored hits on Hōkoku Maru, which shortly blew up and sank.

On 12 February 1944, the Japanese submarine RO-110 was depth charged and sunk east-south-east off Visakhapatnam, India by the Indian sloop HMIS Jumna and the Australian minesweepers HMAS Launceston and HMAS Ipswich (J186). RO-110 had attacked convoy JC-36 (Colombo-Calcutta) and torpedoed and damaged the British merchant Asphalion (6274 GRT).

On 12 August 1944 the German submarine U-198 was sunk near the Seychelles, in position 03º35'S, 52º49'E, by depth charges from HMIS Godavari and the British frigate HMS Findhorn.

==== Notable Indian recipients of gallantry awards ====
HMS Choudri, the future first native Commander-in-Chief of the Pakistani Navy, was appointed as an MBE for his services in the Royal Indian Navy in 1945.

Nilakanta Krishnan, future commander of the Indian Navy in the Bay of Bengal during the 1971 Indo-Pakistani War, was awarded the DSC in 1941.

== Collaboration with the Axis powers ==
Several leaders of the radical revolutionary Indian independence movement broke away from the main Congress and went to war against Britain. Subhas Chandra Bose, once a prominent leader in the Indian National Congress, volunteered to help Nazi Germany and Japan; he claimed in speeches that Britain's opposition to Nazism and Fascism was "hypocrisy", since Britain was itself denying individual liberties to Indians. Moreover, he argued that it was not Germany and Japan but the British Raj which was the enemy, since the British were over-exploiting Indian resources for the war. Bose suggested that there was little possibility of India being attacked by any of the Axis powers provided it did not fight the war on Britain's side.

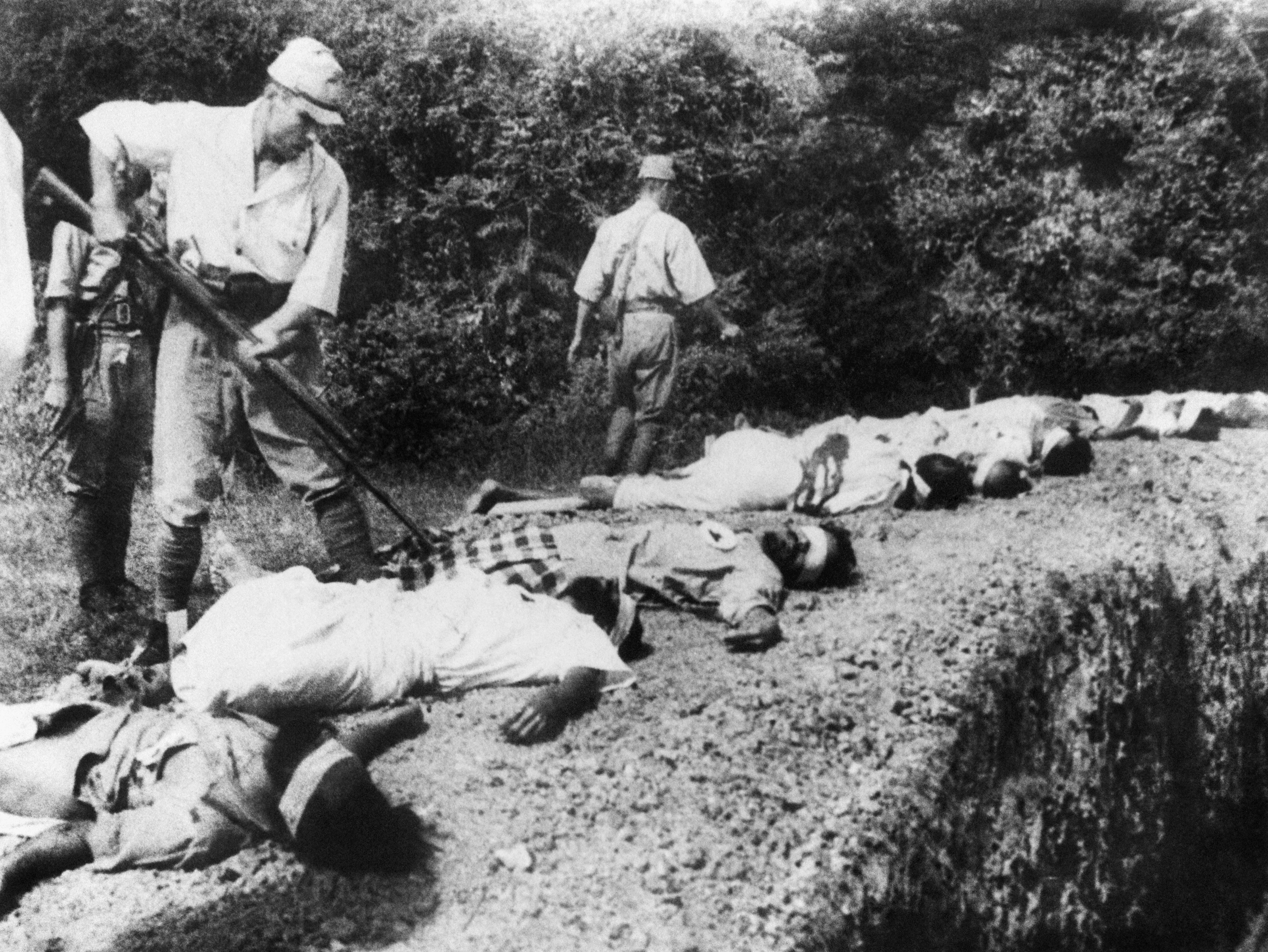
Captured soldiers of the British Indian Army who refused to join the INA were executed by the Japanese.

Nazi Germany was encouraging but gave little help. Bose then approached the Empire of Japan at Tokyo, which gave him control of Indian forces it had organised.

The Indian National Army (INA), formed first by Mohan Singh Deb, consisted initially of prisoners taken by the Japanese in Malaya and at Singapore who were offered the choice of serving the INA by Japan or remaining in very poor conditions in POW camps. Later, after it was reorganised under Subhas Chandra Bose, it drew civilian volunteers from Malaya and Burma. Ultimately, a force of under 40,000 was formed, although only two divisions ever participated in battle. Intelligence and special services groups from the INA were instrumental in destabilising the British Indian Army in the early stages of the Arakan offensive. It was during this time that the British Military Intelligence began propaganda work to shield the true numbers who joined the INA, and also described stories of Japanese brutalities that indicated INA involvement. Further, the Indian press was prohibited from publishing any accounts whatsoever of the INA.

As the Japanese offensive opened, the INA was sent into battle. Bose hoped to avoid set-piece battles for which it lacked arms, armament as well as man-power. Initially, he sought to obtain arms as well as increase its ranks from British Indian soldiers he hoped would defect to his cause. Once the Japanese forces were able to break the British defences at Imphal, he planned for the INA to cross the hills of North-East India into the Gangetic plain, where it was to work as a guerrilla army and expected to live off the land, garner support, supplies, and ranks from amongst the local populace to ultimately touch off a revolution.

Prem Kumar Sahgal, an officer of the INA once Military secretary to Subhas Bose and later tried in the first Red Fort trials, explained that although the war itself hung in balance and nobody was sure if the Japanese would win, initiating a popular revolution with grass-root support within India would ensure that even if Japan lost the war ultimately, Britain would not be in a position to re-assert its colonial authority, which was ultimately the aim of the INA and Azad Hind.

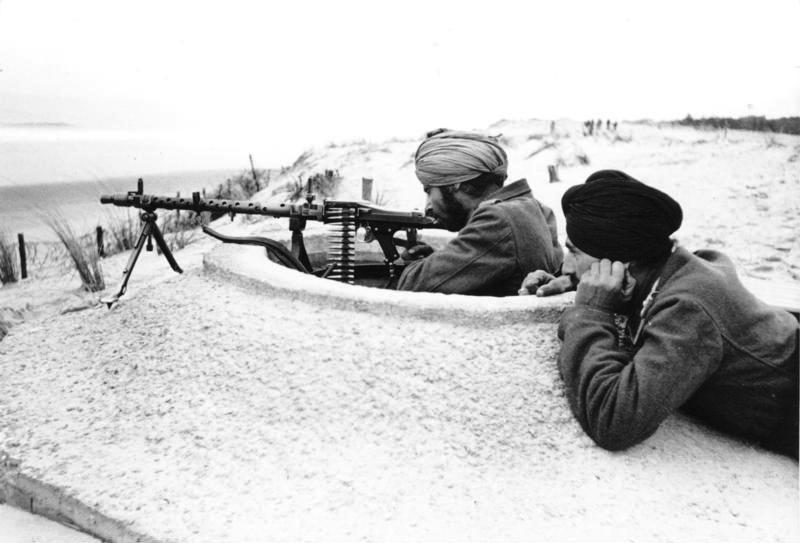
Troops of the Indische Legion guarding the Atlantic Wall in France in March 1944. Subhas Chandra Bose initiated the legion's formation, intended to serve as a liberation force from the British occupation of India.

As Japan opened its offensive towards India, the INA's first division, consisting of four Guerrilla regiments, participated in Arakan offensive in 1944, with one battalion reaching as far as Mowdok in Chittagong. Other units were directed to Imphal and Kohima, as well as to protect Japanese flanks to the south of Arakan, a task it successfully carried out. However, the first division suffered the same fate as did Mutaguchi's Army when the siege of Imphal was broken. With little or no supplies and supply lines deluged by the Monsoon, harassed by Allied air dominance, the INA began withdrawing when the 15th Army and Burma Area Army began withdrawing, and suffered the same terrible fate as wounded, starved and diseased men succumbed during the hasty withdrawal into Burma. Later in the war however, the INA's second division, tasked with the defence of Irrawaddy and the adjoining areas around Nangyu, was instrumental in opposing Messervy's 7th Indian Infantry Division when it attempted to cross the river at Pagan and Nyangyu during the successful Burma Campaign by the Allies the following year. The 2nd division was instrumental in denying the 17th Indian Infantry Division the area around Mount Popa that would have exposed the flank of Kimura's forces attempting to retake Meiktila and Nyangyu. Ultimately however, the division was obliterated. Some of the surviving units of the INA surrendered as Rangoon fell, and helped keep order till the allied forces entered the city. The other remnants began a long march over land and on foot towards Singapore, along with Subhas Chandra Bose. As the Japanese situation became precarious, Bose left for Manchuria to attempt to contact the Russians, and was reported to have died in an air crash near Taiwan.

The only Indian territory that the Azad Hind government controlled was nominally the Andaman and Nicobar Islands. However, they were bases for the Japanese Navy, and the navy never relinquished control. Enraged with the lack of administrative control, the Azad Hind Governor, Lt. Col. Loganathan, later relinquished his authority. After the War, a number of officers of the INA were tried for treason. However, faced with the possibility of a massive civil unrest and a mutiny in the Indian Army, the British officials decided to release the prisoners-of-war; in addition, the event became a turning point to expedite the process of transformation of power and independence of India.

== Bengal famine ==
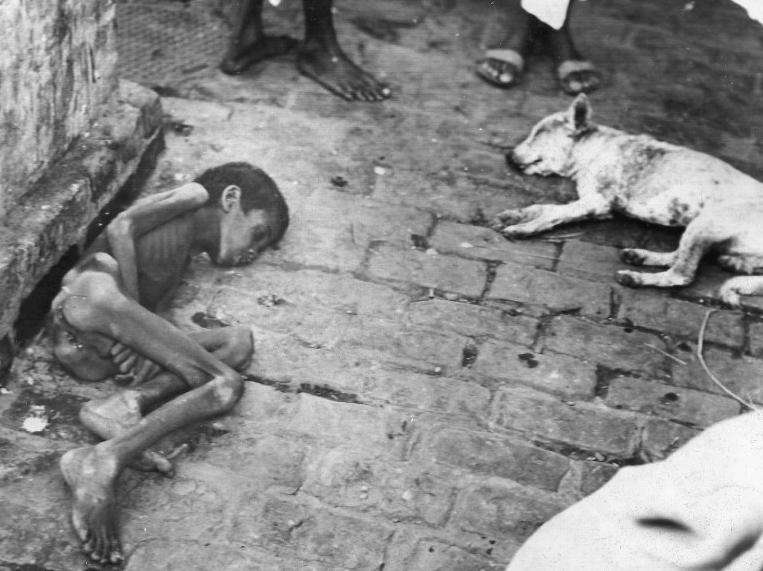
Child who starved to death during the Bengal famine of 1943.

The region of Bengal in India suffered a devastating famine from 1943 to 1944. Some of the key reasons for this famine are:

1. Japanese invasion of Burma which cut off food and other essential supplies to the region;
2. British export of food and material for the war in Europe;
3. British denial orders destroying essential food transportation throughout the Eastern region;
4. British banned transfer of grain from other provinces, turning down offers of grain from Australia;
5. mismanagement by British Indian regional governments;
6. constructing 900 airfields (2000 acres each) taking that huge amount of land out of agriculture in a time of dire need;
7. price inflation caused by war production
8. increase in demand partially as a result of refugees from Burma and Bengal.

The British government denied an urgent request from Leopold Amery, the Indian secretary of state, and Archibald Wavell, the Viceroy of India, to stop exports of food from Bengal in order that it might be used for famine relief. Winston Churchill, then prime minister, dismissed these requests in a fashion that Amery regarded as "Hitler-like," by asking why, if the famine was so horrible, Gandhi had not yet died of starvation.

Indian Economist Amartya Sen (1976) challenged this orthodoxy, reviving the claim that there was no shortage of food in Bengal and that the famine was caused by inflation.

== Princely states ==
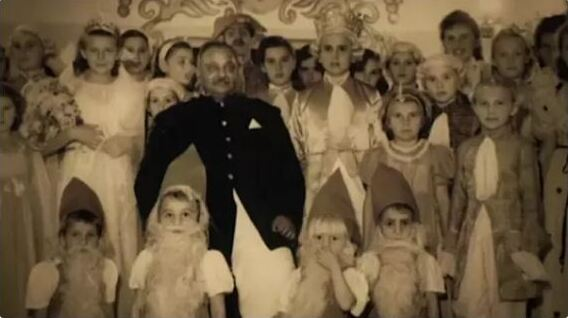
Maharaja Jam Sahib celebrates Christmas with Polish children he rescued from Soviet camps, 1943

During World War II, in 1941, the British presented a captured German BF 109 single-engined fighter to the Nizam of Hyderabad, in return for the funding of 2 RAF fighter squadrons.

There was a campsite for Polish refugees at Valivade, in Kolhapur State, it was the largest settlement of Polish refugees in India during the war. Another such campsite for Polish refugee children was located in Balachadi, it was built by K. S. Digvijaysinhji, Jam Saheb Maharaja of Nawanagar State in 1942, near his summer resort. He gave refuge to hundreds of Polish children rescued from Soviet camps (Gulags). The campsite is now part of the Sainik School.

== 1944–45 Insurgency in Balochistan ==
From 1944 to 1945, Daru Khan Badinzai led an insurgency against the authorities of the Raj. It began in the first half of 1944, when rebels of the Badinzai tribe began interfering with road construction on the British side of the Balochistan border. The insurgency had subsided by March 1945.

== Mazrak Zadran's invasion of India ==
In 1944, the Southern and Eastern provinces of Afghanistan entered a state of turmoil, with the Zadran, Safi and Mangal tribes rising up against the Afghan government. Among the leaders of the revolt was the Zadran chieftain, Mazrak Zadran, who opted to invade British India in late 1944. There he was joined by a Baloch chieftain, Sultan Ahmed. Mazrak was forced to retreat back into Afghanistan due to British aerial bombardment.

== See also ==
- Propaganda and India in World War II
- Burma Campaign
- U Go offensive
- Bombing of Calcutta
- Indian Army during World War II
- List of Indian divisions in World War I
- Military history of India
- Military production during World War II
- Military history of the British Commonwealth in the Second World War
