= India–Poland relations =

- India: Poland

Diplomatic mission
- Embassy of the Republic of Poland, New Delhi: Embassy of India, Warsaw

Envoy
- Chargé d’affaires Sebastian Domżalski: Ambassador Nagma Mallick

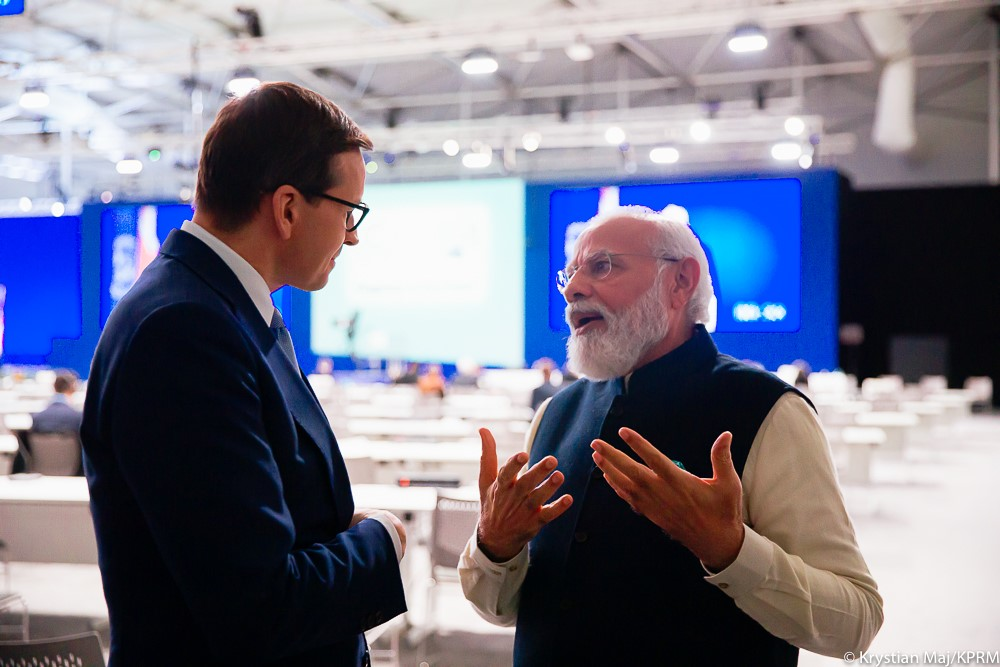
Indian Prime Minister Narendra Modi and Polish Prime Minister Mateusz Morawiecki at COP26 in Glasgow.

India–Poland relations are the bilateral relations between the Republic of Poland and the Republic of India. Diplomatic relations were established on 30 March 1954.

== History ==
=== The Age of Discovery ===
During the 16th century Renaissance and the Age of Discovery period in the Crown of the Kingdom of Poland, a small number of Poland's nobility, statesmen, merchants, and writers visited India and fostered the abiding interest of the Polish people in the civilization, philosophy, spiritual traditions, art, and culture of India.

One of the first diplomatic dignitaries and travellers during this period to make Polish contact with India—then under the expanding rule of the Mughal Empire—was the Polish nobleman and statesman Paweł Palczowski. He was a long-serving royal courtier to King Sigismund III Vasa and hailed from a branch of the distinguished senior Silesian noble House of Saszowski.

Others from this period include Erazm Kretkowski, a Polish diplomatic representative for King Sigismund II Augustus in the Ottoman Empire in 1538 and royal castellan of Brześć Kujawski and Gniezno, and Krzysztof Pawłowski, a Polish seafarer and diarist who provided a description of India preserved in Polish, recorded in a letter dated 1569 to an unknown person. Pawłowski, who came to India in 1569, left a rudimentary description of the sea route from Gdańsk via Portugal (Lisbon) to India (Goa) in the form of a comprehensive letter-relation to a friend in Kraków, in which he described the customs of "dark people".

A consequence of these voyages soon provided Indian echoes in Polish literature.

As early as 1611, the Polish Catholic priest, translator, and poet, Stanisław Grochowski (1542-1612), published a book titled Cudowne wiersze z indyjskiego języka (Wonderful Verses from the Indian Language). It was a translation of the Bhagavad Gita, which had first been translated from Sanskrit into Medieval Latin by the Italian poet and Jesuit missionary Francisco Benci (1542-1594), who had stayed in India and later lectured at the Jesuit college in Pułtusk, Poland, where Stanisław Grochowski was a professor.

=== 19th and early 20th centuries ===
During the 19th century, several Sanskrit classics were translated into Polish and a 'History of Ancient India' in Polish was one of the first of its kind to be published in Europe. A Chair of Sanskrit was set up at the Jagiellonian University of Kraków in 1893. Studies and research in Indian languages and literature had developed at the Universities of Kraków, Warsaw, Wrocław and Poznań.

A consulate of Poland in Mumbai, an honorary consulate in Kolkata and a consular agency in Amritsar were established in 1933, 1935 and 1936, respectively, and the consulate in Mumbai was elevated to a consulate-general in 1939.

=== World War II ===
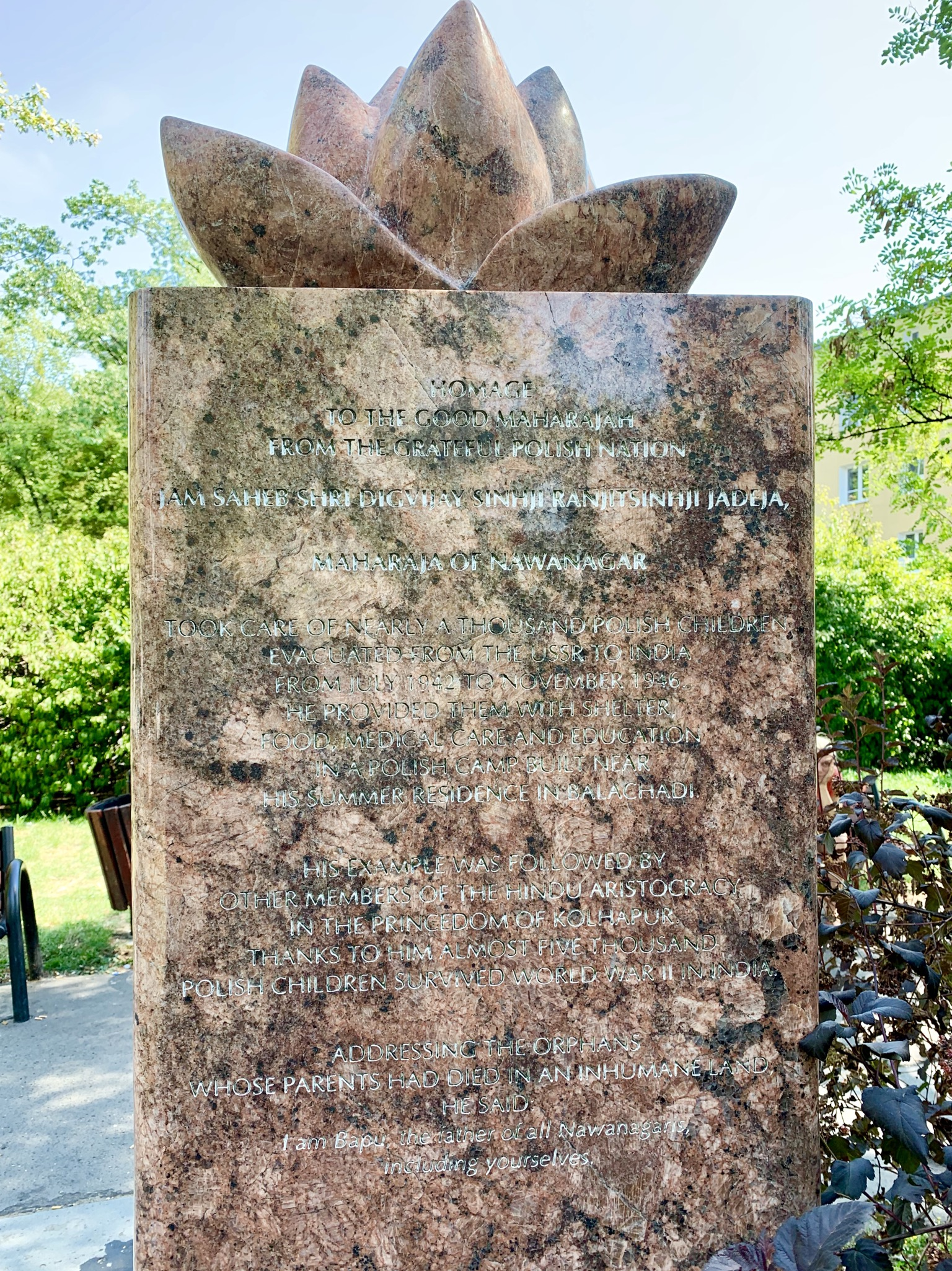
Monument to Digvijaysinhji Ranjitsinhji Jadeja at the Good Maharaja Square in Warsaw.

Mahatma Gandhi and Jawaharlal Nehru were known to be vocal supporters of Poland's struggle against the invasion of Poland by Germany, the Soviet Union, and a small Slovak contingent that marked the beginning of World War II. Both Indian intelligentsia and Indian military officials were vocal supporters of Polish autonomy and freedom when Germany and the Soviet Union occupied Poland in September 1939. Many Polish citizens were given refuge in India by Indian maharajas. One of the refugees was the accomplished Polish visual artist Stefan Norblin whom the Maharaja of Jodhpur commissioned to decorate the Umaid Bhawan Palace with a series of paintings, decorations and furniture designs. They were rediscovered in the 1990s. Whilst staying in India during World War II, Norblin also painted portraits of the local aristocracy and decorated their residences.

Indian prisoners of war were held by the Germans alike Polish and other Allied POWs in the Stalag XX-B and Stalag XXI-B POW camps located in Malbork and Tur, respectively.

Poles and Indians were part of the large Allied coalition in the major battles of Tobruk (1941) and Monte Cassino (1944).

==== Aid to Polish refugees in India ====
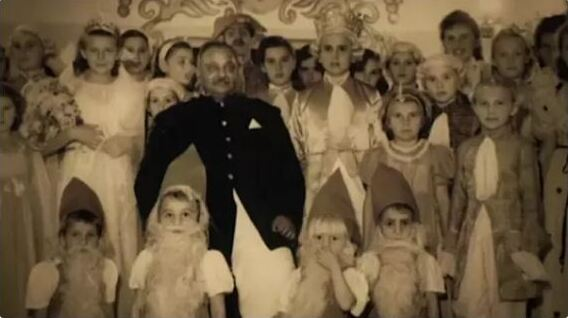
Maharaja Digvijaysinhji Ranjitsinhji Jadeja with Polish children on Christmas Eve

During the Second World War Occupation of Poland by the Soviet Union in the east and the German Reich in the west, the Maharaja Jam Sahib of Nawanagar State, Digvijaysinhji Ranjitsinhji Jadeja of Nawanagar, extended hospitality and sanctuary to more than 640 Polish displaced persons, the majority were orphaned children and women, out of some 5,000 refugees sent to India from Soviet deportation, and despite India itself suffering from a severe backdrop of drought and famine at that time. After their ship and plight was turned away by every country approached and when the British Crown governor in Mumbai (Bombay) too refused them entry, the Maharaja Jam Sahib, frustrated by the lack of empathy and unwillingness of the British government to act, ordered the ship to dock at Rozi port in his province. The displaced persons, lived in camps in several places in western India, including Balachadi (near Jamnagar), Valivade (near Kolhapur) and Panchgani. Digvijaysinhji Ranjitsinhji's unparalleled act of generosity, saw him become patron of the first public school complex founded in Poland after the Second World War, located in the capital of Warsaw, and named Jam Saheba Digvijay Sinhji in his honour. In 2012, the Sejm of the Republic of Poland, honoured the 50th anniversary of his death, posthumously awarding the Commander's Cross of the Order of Merit of the Republic of Poland, and the Warsaw City Council named one of its city park squares in Ochota district after him - the 'Square of the Good Maharaja' (Skwer Dobrego Maharadży).

=== Cold War ===
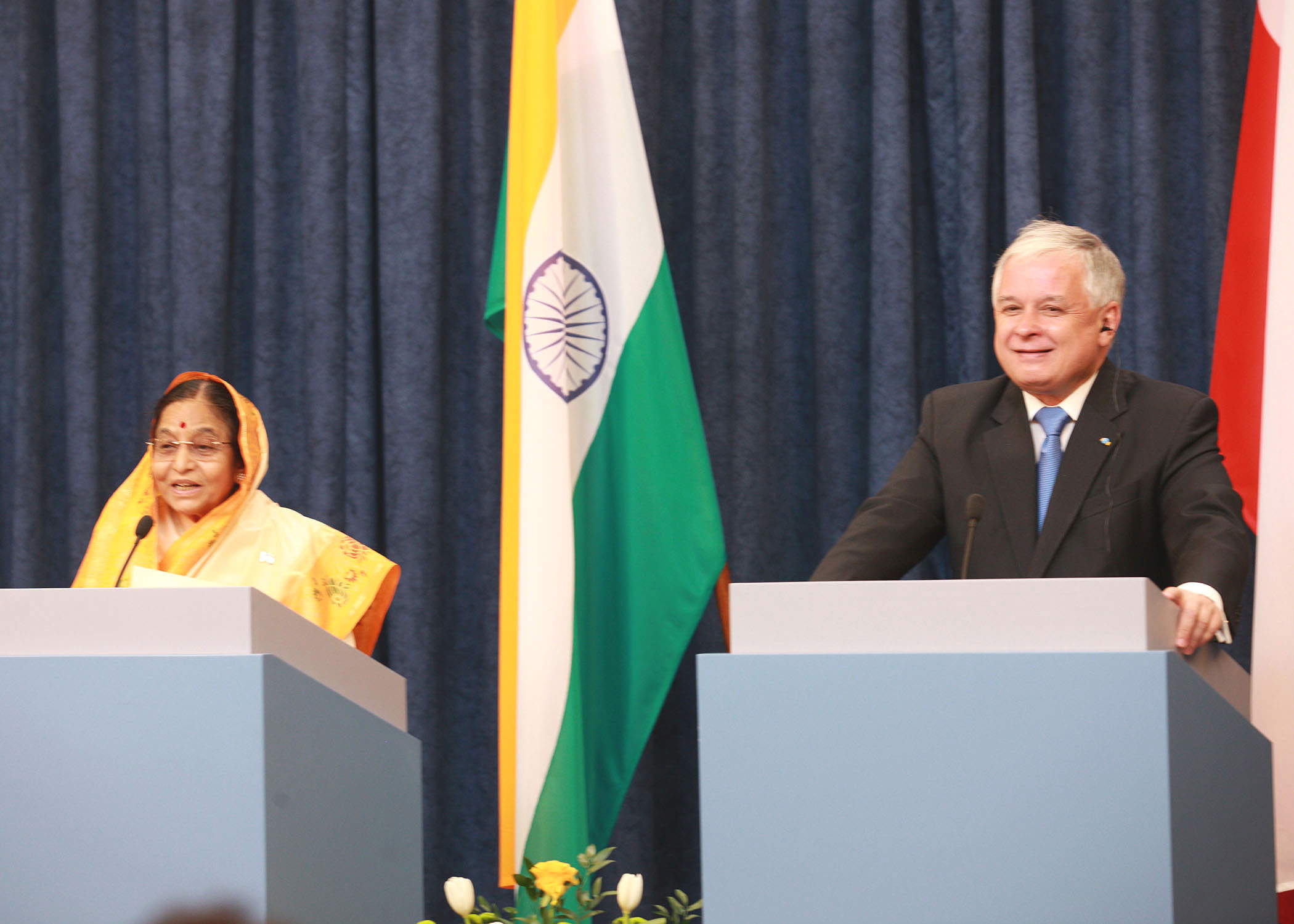
Then President of India, Pratibha Devisingh Patil and then President of Poland, Lech Kaczyński, delivering a press statement after the signing of a memorandum of understanding between India & Poland at the Presidential Palace in Warsaw, April 2009.

During the post-war period, when Poland became the Polish People's Republic under the Soviet Occupation Forces and Soviet-backed communist regime, Poland, then a state in the Eastern Bloc, was not a free agent to choose its destiny. This relaxed after the death of Joseph Stalin in 1953. The international situation became less tense, and the new Soviet leader Nikita Khrushchev took a liking to India's prime minister Jawaharlal Nehru. In 1954, Poland and India formally agreed to establish resident diplomatic missions, and the Indian Embassy in Warsaw was opened in 1957, shortly after the 1956 Polish October revolution that marked a change in the politics of Poland. During the Cold War period, both Warsaw and New Delhi had close ties with the Soviet Union and this made them natural friends. On 25 January 1977 an agreement on the operation of air services between the two countries was signed in New Delhi.

One of the political emigrants who avoided returning to communist Poland was the renowned architect Maciej Nowicki. While he was a professor at the University of North Carolina, he was entrusted with designing the modern capital of Punjab. His plans were groundbreaking and could constitute a new quality in world urban planning. However, his project was never realized due to his untimely death in a plane crash on his way back from India to the United States on 31 August 1950. Nowicki was only 40 at the time. The work on the plan of Chandigarh was consequently entrusted to the world-renowned Swiss-French architect Le Corbusier.

== Post Cold War ==
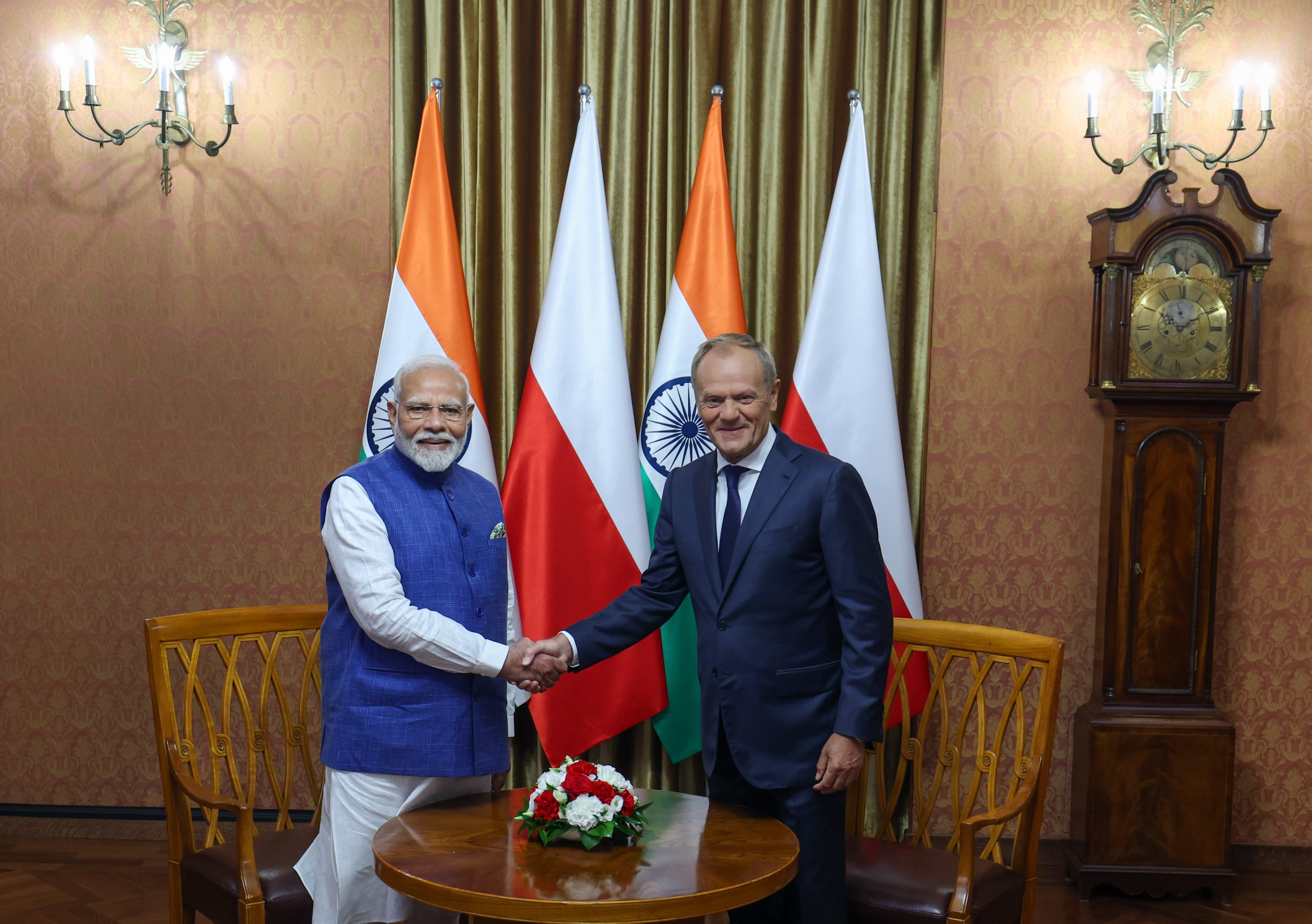
Polish Prime Minister Donald Tusk and Indian Prime Minister Narendra Modi during an official meeting in Warsaw on 22 August 2024

Following the fall of Communism in Poland, both countries focused on improving ties with the European Community and the United States. Even after the events of 1989, when Poland transitioned to the modern democratic Republic of Poland, relations with India have maintained continuity and have remained on an even keel reflecting relations with India were not an adjunct of the Cold War and are based on sound principles. Contacts between the Indian and Polish Parliaments were established after the collapse of Communism in 1989. A Polish parliamentary delegation led by the Marshal of the Sejm, had visited India in December 1992. A Polish-Indian Parliamentary Group had been set up during the term of the last Parliament which held office from 1996 to 2001. Speaker of Lok Sabha, Manohar Joshi led a multi-party Parliamentary delegation to Poland from 22 to 26 May 2002. Also, the Speaker of the Sejm of the Republic of Poland, Jozef Oleksy, led a Polish parliamentary delegation to India from 9–11 December 2004. In April 2009, Indian President Pratibha Devisingh Patil visited Poland. In September 2010, Polish Prime Minister Donald Tusk visited India and met with Indian politicians and businessmen.

In May 2021, Poland donated over 1.5 tons of medical equipment including oxygen concentrators to India in response to a sharp rise of COVID-19 infections in India.

During the 2022 Russian invasion of Ukraine, Poland served as one of the transit countries used by India during Operation Ganga, the evacuation of Indian nationals from Ukraine. Indian authorities stated that more than 4,000 Indian students were evacuated through Poland.

Prime Minister Narendra Modi visited Poland on 21–22 August 2024, the first visit by an Indian prime minister to the country in 45 years. During talks with Prime Minister Donald Tusk, India and Poland agreed to elevate their relations to a strategic partnership. The two governments also adopted an Action Plan for 2024–2028 covering political and security cooperation, trade and investment, transport, energy, mining, science and technology, and cooperation concerning India–European Union relations. The talks also included strengthening the defence industry collaboration between India and Poland as well as discussing the ongoing War in Ukraine.

In January 2026, Polish Deputy Prime Minister and Foreign Minister Radosław Sikorski visited India and held talks with Indian External Affairs Minister S. Jaishankar. The discussions included bilateral economic relations, security and India–European Union cooperation. The visit was also marked by public differences over Poland's relations with Pakistan and India's relations with Russia.

=== Trade, investment, defence and the economy ===
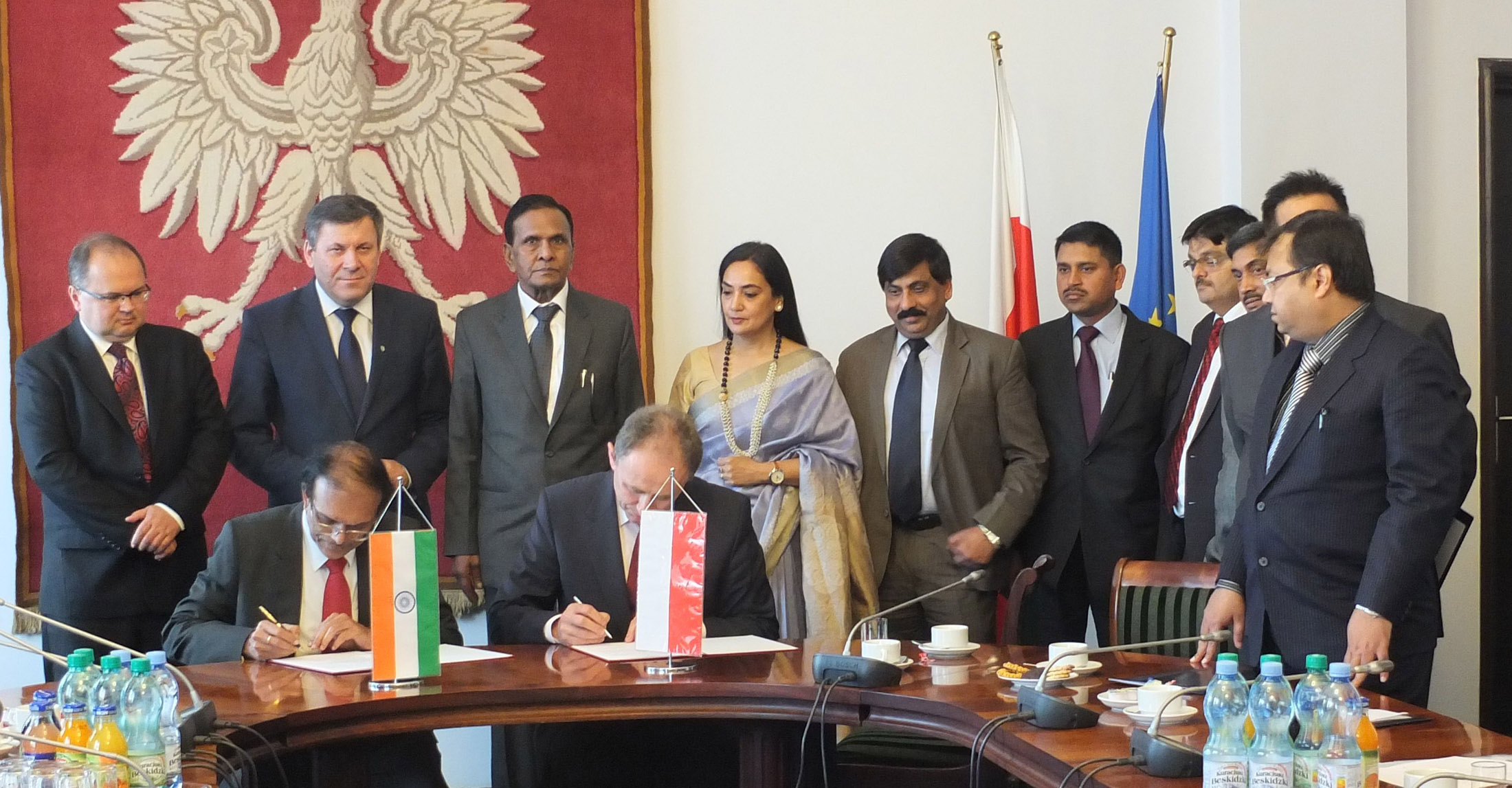
Former Secretary, Ministry of Steel, India, G. Mohan Kumar and former Deputy Prime Minister and Minister of Economy, Poland, Janusz Piechociński, strengthening ties between India and Poland, in Warsaw, October 2013.

=== Economic ties ===
Bilateral trade between the two countries has grown about eleven times from 1992 to 2008. Bilateral trade, which totaled US$675.73 million (approximately ₹3,825 crores) and US$861.78 million (approximately ₹4,873 crores) in 2006 and 2007 respectively, crossed US$1 billion (approximately ₹5,700 crores) in 2008 with US$1274.77 million (approximately ₹7,000 crores). During 2005, major Indian companies signed several agreements on investments that are expected to create more than 3,500 new jobs in Poland. India's major exports to Poland include Tea, Coffee, Spices, Textiles, Pharmaceuticals, machinery and instruments, auto parts and surgical items. India's imports from Poland include machinery except electric and electronic appliances, artificial resins, plastic material, non-ferrous metals and machine tools. Confederation of Indian Industry (CII) has sent several delegations to Poland to explore economic opportunities in various sectors. Indian companies such as Tata Consultancy Services, Wipro Technologies, ZenSar and Videocon have already set up their bases in Poland. The 'Indo-Polish Chamber of Commerce and Industry'(IPCCI) was formed in 2008 under the astute leadership of Mr Jowahar Jyothi Singh(JJ Singh) to protect and represent the interests within the range of economic activity and to promote economic relations between India and Poland. Direct nonstop flights provided by LOT Polish Airlines between Warsaw Chopin Airport and Indira Gandhi International Airport started September 12, 2019.

Both countries have a long-standing history of cooperation in science and technology. The first Indo-Polish Agreement on this cooperation was signed in March 1974; subsequently, a new agreement with more focus Programmes of Cooperation (POC) in science and technology were signed between the two countries from time to time. The Council of Scientific and Industrial Research (CSIR) and the Indian National Science Academy (INSA) have ongoing scientific exchange programs with the Polish Academy of Sciences (PAS).

=== Defence ties ===
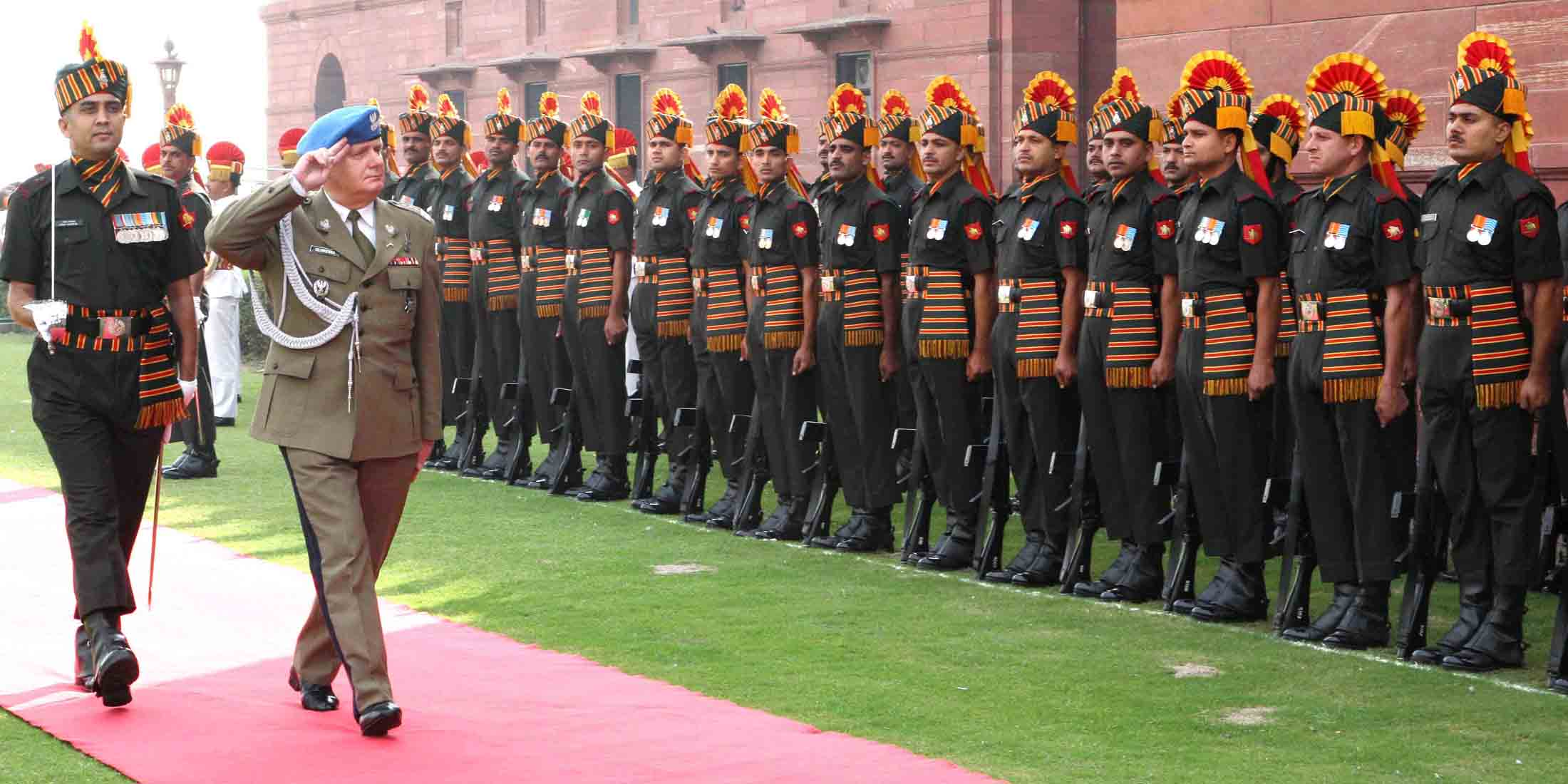
General Zbigniew Głowienka, Commander of the Polish Land Forces, in New Delhi in 2010

India's defence relations with Poland have grown from military cooperation to comprehensive defence cooperation that includes courses, training for UN peacekeeping operations, and exchange of observers during army exercises. India and Poland signed the Memorandum of Understanding on Defence Cooperation in February 2003 during the visit of the Prime Minister of Poland Leszek Miller to India. India awarded contracts worth US$600 million (₹3.5 thousand-crores) to Poland for modernisation of tanks and the acquisition of air defence missiles. The T-72M1 with 800 horsepower engines were upgraded with 1000 hp engines and re-equipped with modern fire control systems (DRAWA-T) and thermal imaging equipment. Both India and Poland are considering privatising their defence industries and see good prospects for mutual investments. Indian Army chief General Deepak Kapoor visited Warsaw in March 2008 followed by Poland's Deputy Foreign Minister Ryszard Schnepf in June the same year. India also acquired 625 assault parachutes from the Polish company Air-Pol with automatic devices ensuring their reliable opening, with a total value of US$1.5 million. India's growing defence buy-outs from Poland has disappointed Russia which had considered India a safe market for its military hardware. Poland also delivered a batch of 80 WZT-3 armoured recovery vehicles (ARVs) to the Indian Army in 2001 at the Kolar Gold Fields facility in Karnataka and the remaining batch in 2004. The final batch of 40 WZT-3 ARVs were assembled in India from kits supplied from Poland.

=== Education ===
Indian students were the third largest group of foreign students in Poland in 2021, the fifth largest in 2022 and the sixth largest in 2023 and 2024, at the same time being the largest group from South Asia.

== Resident diplomatic missions ==
- India has an embassy in Warsaw.
- Poland has an embassy in New Delhi and a consulate-general in Mumbai.
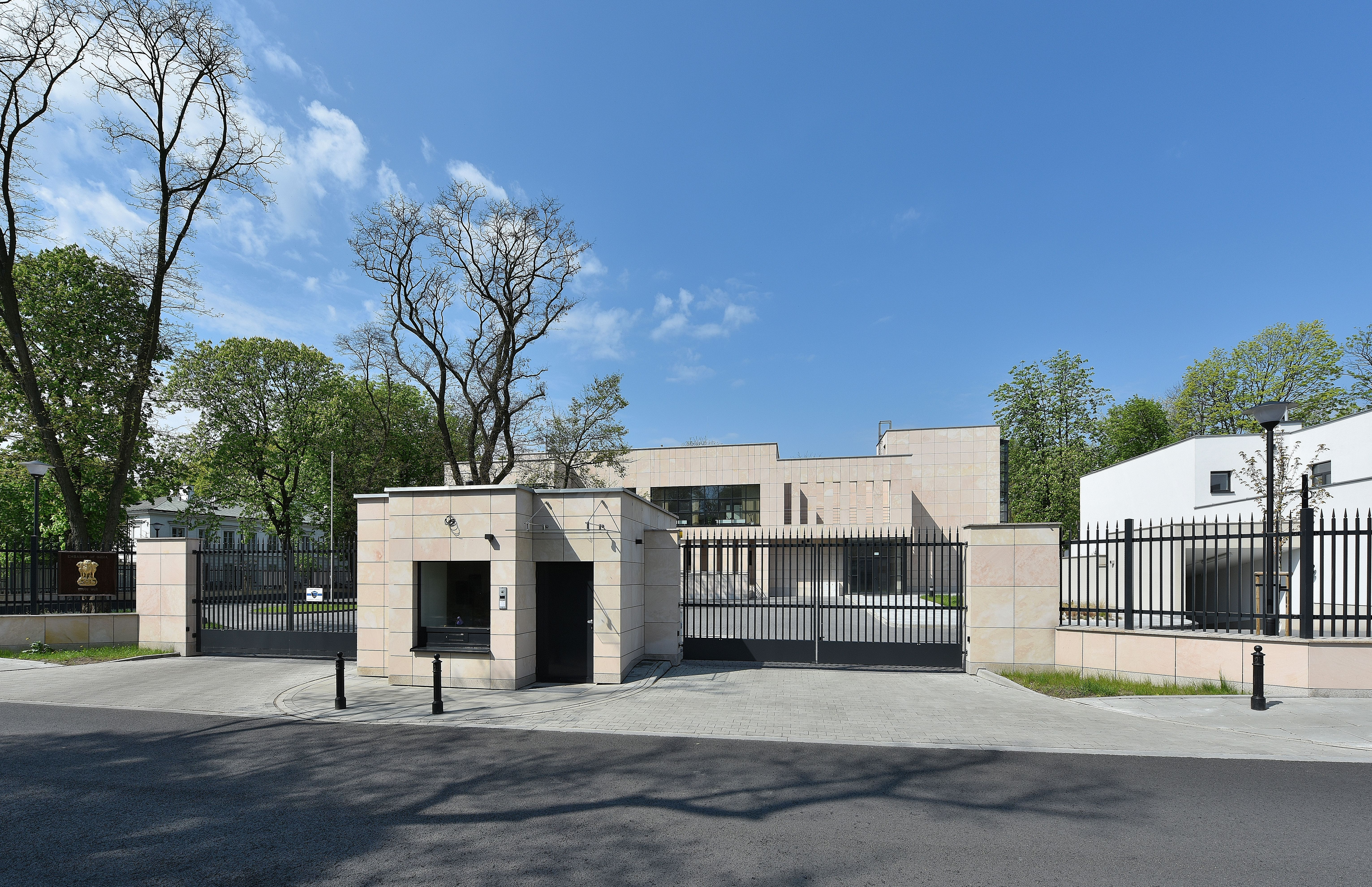
Embassy of India in Warsaw

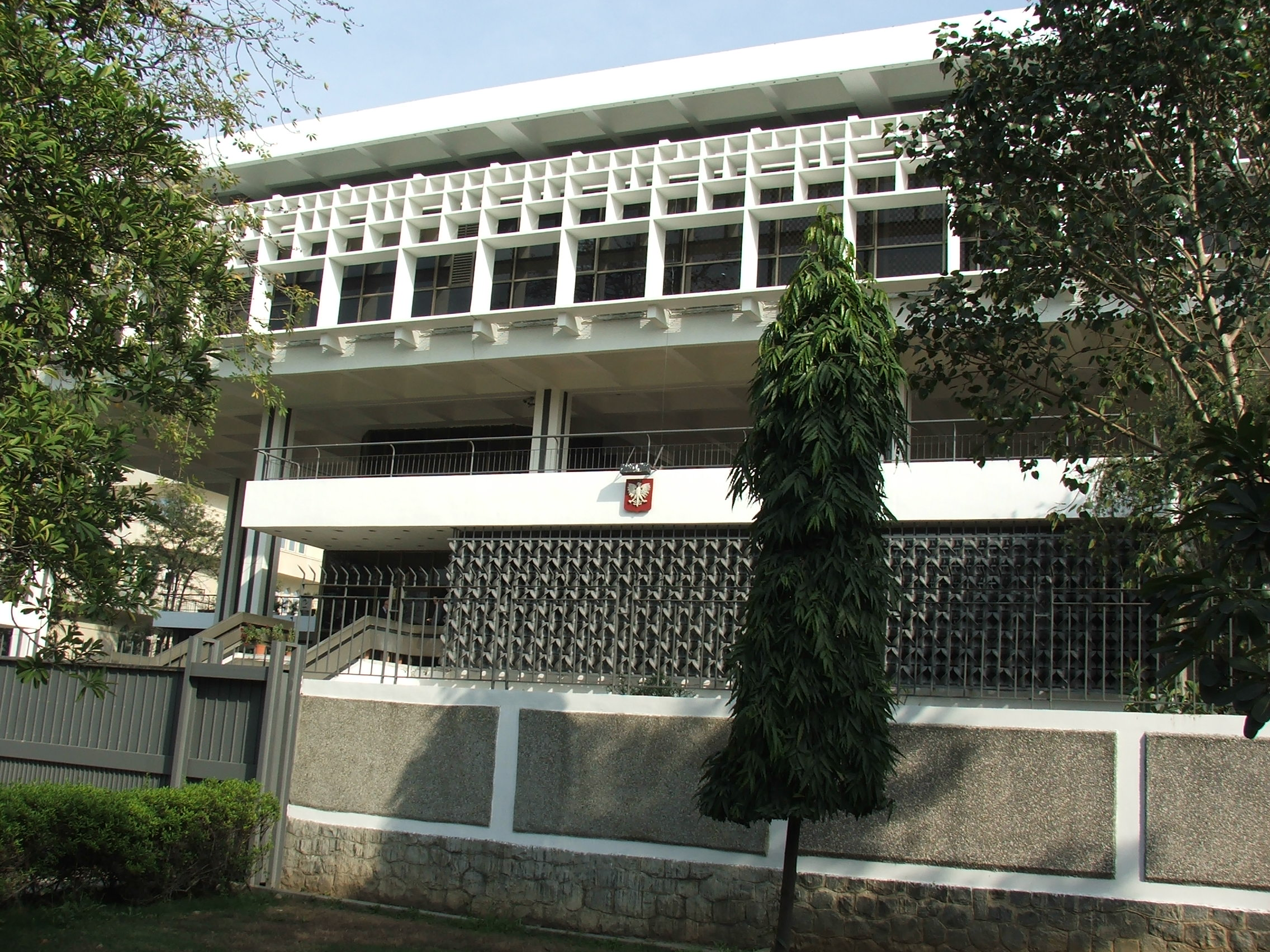
Embassy of Poland in New Delhi

== See also ==
- Foreign relations of India
- Foreign relations of Poland
- Indians in Poland
- Hinduism in Poland
