= Memorial Pillar (Valivade) =

World War II refugee memorial in India

The Memorial Pillar located in Valivade (a village near Kolhapur, India) is in memory of over 5000 Polish refugees who escaped to India during World War II and were given shelter in the area. Poland's Deputy Foreign Minister Marcin Przydacz unveiled the pillar on 14 September 2019. Valivade was India's largest Polish refugee camp, receiving its first group in June 1943 and caring for families until most returned home in 1948, though some remained permanently. Alongside the pillar, a commemorative museum was planned to house photographs, artifacts and oral histories of camp life, but the site has since suffered from deferred maintenance. Despite its state of neglect, the monument and adjacent cemetery continue to serve as potent symbols of India-Poland solidarity and wartime compassion.

== History ==
The Memorial Pillar at Valivade was unveiled on 14 September 2019 by Poland's Deputy Foreign Minister Marcin Przydacz in the presence of Poland's Ambassador Adam Burakowski and Maharashtra's Guardian Minister Chandrakant Patil, commemorating the more than 5,000 Polish refugees who found sanctuary in Valivade between 1943 and 1948 during World War II. Valivade was India's largest Polish refugee camp, with the first group arriving on 11 June 1943 and most returning home by 1948, although some chose to remain and make India their permanent home. Alongside the pillar, a commemorative museum was announced to house photographs, artifacts, and oral histories of camp life, ensuring that the legacy of wartime compassion endures. There were other smaller Polish settlements in India at the time in areas such as Balachadi and Panchgani which offered settlement mainly due to the hospitality of Maharaja of Kolhapur and Digvijaysinhji Ranjitsinhji Jadeja, Maharaja Jam Sahib of Nawanagar State.

In September 2019, a Polish ministerial delegation laid the Valivade pillar's foundation stone, marking the start of India-Poland commemoration at the original refugee site. In November 2024, Prime Minister Narendra Modi visited a sister memorial in Warsaw, becoming the first Indian premier there in 45 years. The Warsaw plaque reads, "Thanks to the hospitality of the principality of Kolhapur. Dispersed throughout the world, we remember India with heartfelt gratitude." Following the Warsaw visit and Modi's public mention, tourists flocking to photograph the pillar.

== Architecture ==
The Pillar is a monolithic column of polished stone rising from a two‑tiered stepped plinth, situated at the entrance to the former refugee camp in Valivade. Its smooth surface bears inscriptions in Polish and English commemorating "Polish Children's Camp, Valivade, 1943-1948," and it is surmounted by a sculpted bronze Polish Eagle emblem symbolizing national gratitude. The memorial plaza is paved with local stone and framed by low seating walls, offering a contemplative space for reflection. Interpretive panels at the base provide historical context drawn from refugee memoirs and camp records. A Polish cemetery is also in Vilavade, home to 78 people who died there. The structure itself now shows moss growth and chipped paint from years of deferred maintenance. Although a small museum was briefly built beside the pillar, lack of clear custodial responsibility (panchayat vs. district board) has left both museum and memorial largely unrestored, despite early plans to display barracks, photographs and artifacts from the 1943-48 refugee camp.

== See also ==
- India–Poland relations
