= Embassy of India, Warsaw =

Embassy of India in Warsaw
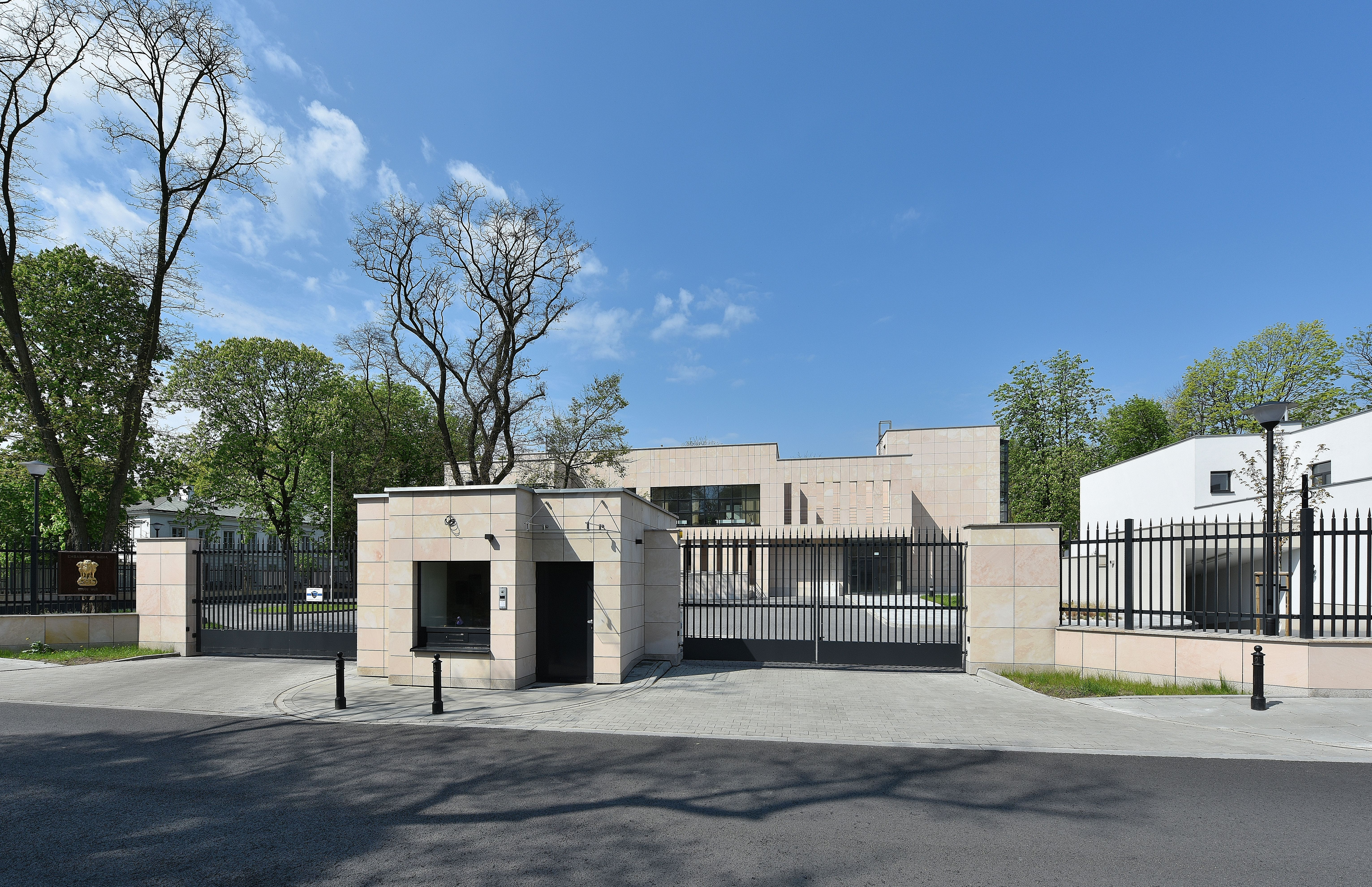
- The Embassy building in Warsaw
- Location: Warsaw
- Address: ul. Myśliwiecka 2, 00–459 Warsaw, Poland
- Inaugurated: 1954
- Ambassador: Nagma Mallick
- Jurisdiction: Poland; Lithuania
- Website: Embassy of India in Poland

Embassy of India in Warsaw is the chief diplomatic mission of the India in Poland. It is on Kawalerii street in the Ujazdów district. The current Indian ambassador to Poland is Nagma Mallick.

== Headquarters ==
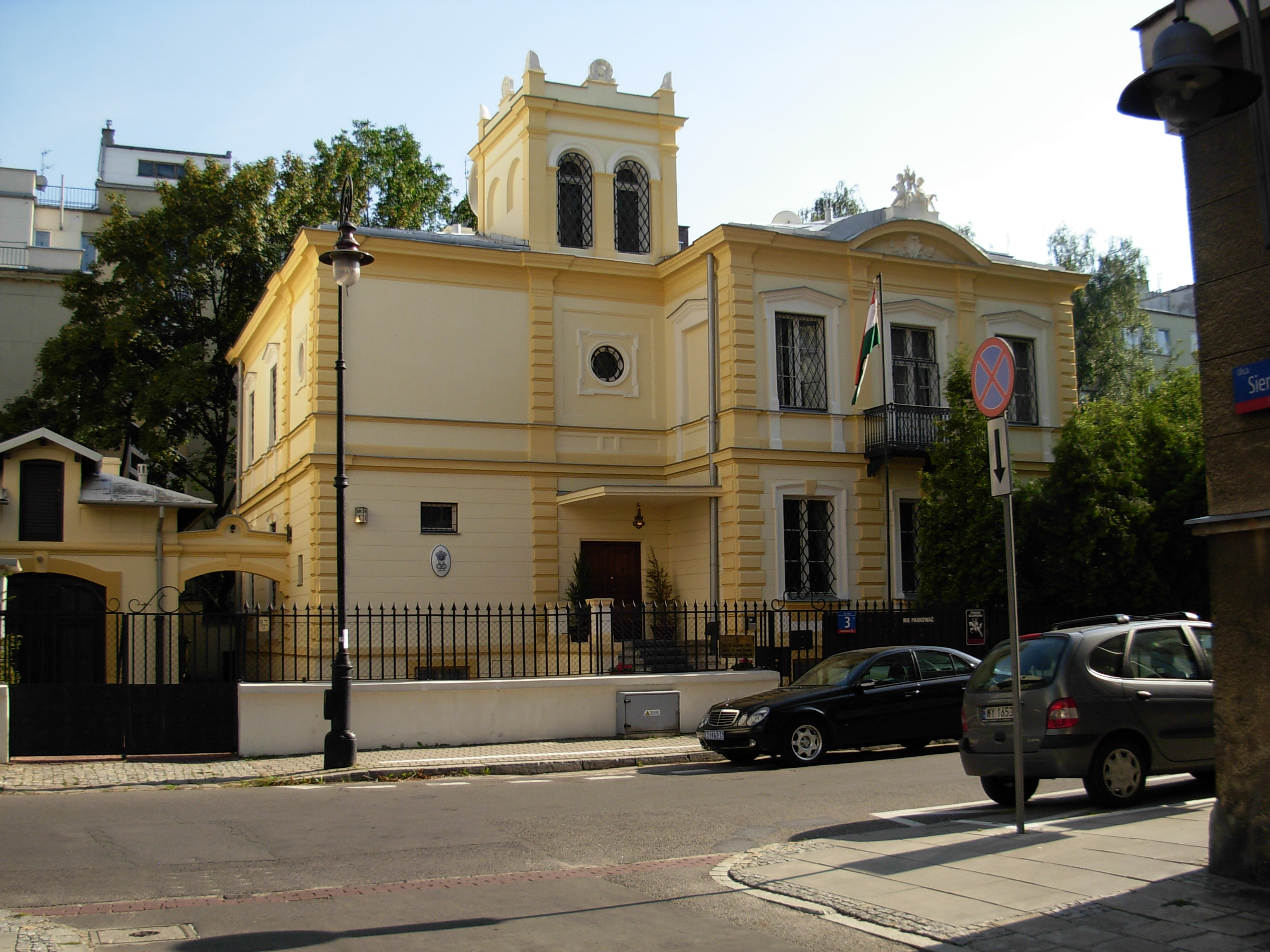
Dom Indyjski ("India House"), former seat of the Indian Embassy (1959) and then residence of the Indian Ambassador

India established diplomatic relations with Poland in 1954, and opened the embassy in Warsaw in 1957. Initially, the Indian ambassador to Moscow was also accredited in Warsaw. First seat of the Embassy was in Bristol Hotel at Krakowskie Przedmieście street (1957–1958), at al. Róż 3 (1959), at the Bristol Hotel at ul. Krakowskie Przedmieście (1961), at ul. Niegolewskiego 16 (1962–1978), at ul. Rejtana 15 (1979–1988), at ul. Starościńska 1b (1990–1991), then at ul. Rejtana 15 (1991–2015). From August 2015, the Embassy is located in the newly built headquarters at Myśliwiecka street.

== See also ==
- India–Poland relations

== Bibliography ==
- Polish diplomatic relations. Informant. Volume III. Asia, Transcaucasia, Australia and Oceania 1918–2009 , Ministry of Foreign Affairs, Archives / Askon Publishing House, Warsaw 2010, p. 286, ISBN 978-83-7452-042-3
