= Kira Banasińska =

Kira Banasińska (1899-2002) was the wife of Eugeniusz Banasiński, the first Polish Consul-General in Bombay. She was a representative of the Polish Red Cross in India. Kira cared for and helped in rehabilitating the lives of several thousand Polish children, women and old people who were refugees from Russia, who were accommodated during World War II with local help in India.

== Role in the Resettlement of Polish Refugees ==
While fleeing persecution in the erstwhile Soviet Union, thousands of malnourished Polish refugees had gathered on foot. She led the movement in India to source relief and aid for the refugees. She immediately initiated awareness campaigns and fundraisers in support of the refugees. Banasińska facilitated their entry into India on supply trucks. She then worked with government officials in Maharashtra and Gujarat to develop dedicated settlements for the refugees.

In 1942, she convinced Jam Sahib Digvijaysinhji Ranjitsinhji Jadeja of Nawanagar to shelter and school 1000 refugee Polish children at his winter home in Jamnagar-Balachadi.

By 1943, she worked with the Jam Sahib to start construction for a family camp at a stretch of his land in Valivade, a quarter city of Kolhapur. She helped move resources to build a large number of barracks to house over 6500 Poles. In 1945, the camp at Balachadi was closed and the children were transferred to the family camp in Valivade. The city, situated 9 km away from Kolhapur, was home to 10,000 Polish refugees during 1943–1947.

== Personal life ==
In 1944, Kira Banasińska and her husband left their jobs in India, and moved to London after the war. Two years later, Kira - reluctant to reside in communist Poland - returned to India. In 1958, the couple applied for Indian citizenship.

== Role in Montessori Education Movement in India ==
Banasińska pioneered Montessori Education in India with help from industrialist JRD Tata.

== Death ==
Kira lived to the age of 102 and died in Hyderabad in 2002. She was buried beside her husband in St Peter's cemetery at Mahalakshmi.

== Awards and recognition ==
in 1991, Banasińska was awarded the Order of Polonia Restituta, Poland's highest civilian order for her work on behalf of the children.
