= Balachadi =

Village in Jodiya Taluka of Jamnagar district, Gujarat, India

Coordinates: 22°36′N 70°13′E

Balachadi is a village in Jodiya Taluka of Jamnagar district, Gujarat, India. It is 25 kilometres east of Jamnagar, near the Gulf of Kutch.

== History ==
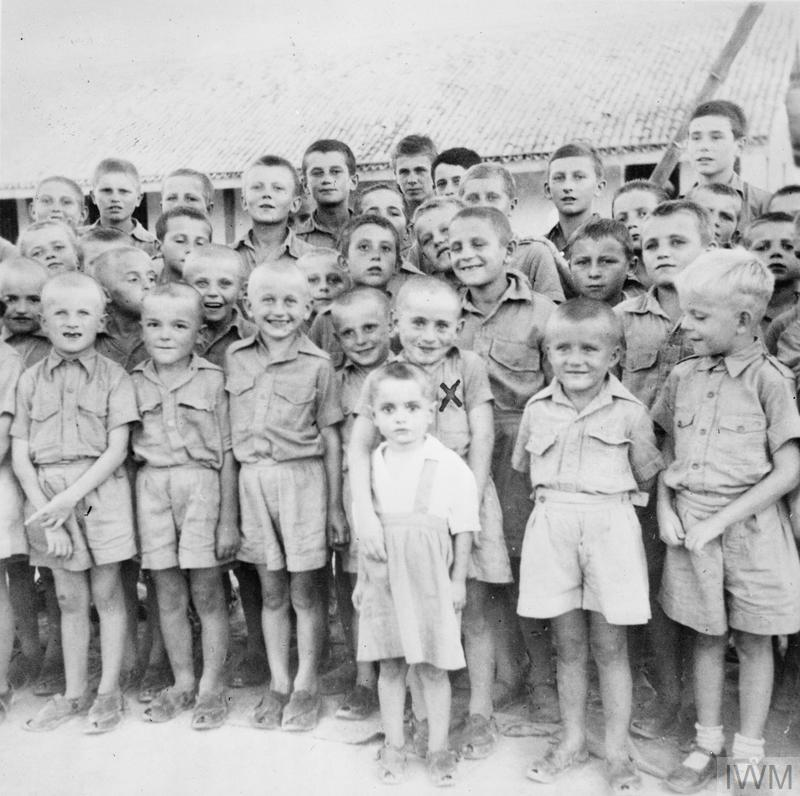
Polish child refugees and war orphans in Balachadi, India, 1941

During the British period, Balachari belonged to the Hadiana sub-division of the Jodiya pargana under Nawanagar State. The Balachadi Estate was formerly a seaside summer resort that belonged to the rulers of Nawanagar. The estate comprises 426 acres of land.

There was a campsite for Polish refugee children of World War II, built by K. S. Digvijaysinhji, Jam Saheb Maharaja of Nawanagar in 1942, near his summer resort. He gave refuge to hundreds of Polish children rescued from Soviet concentration camps. The campsite is now part of the Sainik School. There were other bigger Polish settlements in India at the time in areas such as Valivade and Panchgani in Maharashtra. Valivade was the largest settlement of Polish citizens In India during the war.

The Sainik School, Balachadi is the only Sainik School of Gujarat. It was established in 1961.

== Etymology ==
The sea-shore is about three-fourths of a mile to the north of the village, and there are some rocky heights, almost the only lofty ground along the southern shore of the Gulf of Kutch. It is probably to these high shores that the village owes its name namely Balachari, Lofty Village, as these bluffs are a great landmark in this part of the gulf.

Other derivation for the name of this village is from Balakhadi or 'the Burying Place of the Children,' as it is said in ancient legends to be the burial ground of the children of the Yadavas. But this derivation is mostly not accepted.

== Places of interest ==
It is believed that formerly the land extended far to the north of its present range and that it has encroached three or four miles to the south during the last 1000 or 1200 years. A small masonry platform on which are numerous lingas or symbols of Shiva is said to be visible on very extraordinary low tides.

On the sea-coast, about three-fourths of a mile from Balachari, is a temple of Baleshvar, specially worshiped by Rabaris and Bharvads, but also reverenced by other castes. Near the temple is a pipal tree called the Moksh Piplo and said to have been there since the time of Krishna. The legend regarding the Baleshvar Mahadev is as follows : That the linga was originally covered with sand, and a herdsman's cow used always to go there and pour her milk over the spot underneath which the linga lay. The herdsman noticing this one day followed her, and the cow, fearing that she might be prevented offering her adoration to the Mahadev, galloped to the spot and her hoof struck accidentally against the ling but with such force that an impression of her hoof was left in the stone. The herdsman following dug at the spot, and found that there was a linga. Accidentally his digging instrument struck the linga and blood spurted therefrom, and the mark of the blow is still visible, as is the impression of the cow's hoof. When the herdsman returned to his village and related these marvels a temple was built over it and it was installed with much devotion. Fairs are held at the Moksh Piplo or Salvation Pipal on the thirteenth-fourteenth and last day of the dark half of the month of Shraavana. Many people come from Jamnagar, Hariana, Jodiya, and the surrounding villages to this fair, and booths are erected, and toys, sweets, and country cloth are sold therein.

== Economy ==
The aloe littorals, Kunwar Pathu, abounds on the coast and its flower-stalks are gathered largely for pickling and exported. These stalks are called selran. Near the village is a large tank which however only retains its water until January or February according to the rainfall.

Fish are caught at both Balachari and Sachana in stone vadas or enclosures; the fish enter these at high tide, and when the tide recedes the water filters through the enclosure walls which are built of loose stones, and the fish are left stranded. Turtles are often caught in these enclosures. The loose stones of the walls of these enclosures are soon cemented together by oysters and are then very strong. They are semicircular in shape with the convex side facing the sea. At Sachana there is a bush vada not very far above low-water mark. Branches of Babul are firmly fixed in a low stone wall until a large hedged enclosure is completed some 600 or 800 yards in length. In this enclosure very large fish are often caught, especially rays of different kinds in which this coast abounds, sharks, sawfish, swordfish, pomfret, soles, and sometimes even the dugong. Turtles of very large size are found, and one of the species found in these seas has a large thick tail. The small pearl oyster is found on the coral reefs on the coast and also on those fringing the islands in the gulf as well as two or three other kinds of oyster.
