= Nagma Mallick =

Indian diplomat

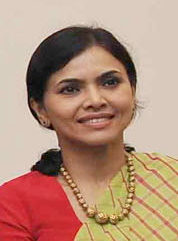
- Portrait of Mallick

Ambassador of India to Japan
- Incumbent
- Assumed office October 2025
- Prime Minister: Narendra Modi
- Preceded by: Sibi George

Personal details
- Born: 22 April 1967 (age 59)
- Education: St. Stephen's College; Delhi School of Economics

Nagma Mohamed Mallick (born 22 April 1967) is an Indian civil servant of the Indian Foreign Service. She holds the rank of Secretary/Grade I of the government. She is currently the Ambassador of India to Japan from 2025 onwards. Previously, she served as Ambassador of India to Republic of Poland and the Republic of Lithuania from 2021 till 2025. On 29 June 2015 she was appointed as the High Commissioner of India to Brunei Darussalam. Before this posting, she served as India's Ambassador to Tunisia from October 2012 to November 2015. She was a TV and stage actress, and acted in India's first television soap opera, Hum Log.

== Early life ==
She was born in New Delhi to Keralite parents from Kasaragod and was educated at St Stephen's College & Delhi School of Economics. She holds a bachelor's degree in English Literature and a master's degree in Sociology.

== Career ==
She joined the Indian Foreign Service in 1991 as a career diplomat. She was the first Muslim woman in the Indian Foreign Service. Her first posting was in Paris where she served in the Indian Mission to UNESCO. Thereafter, in New Delhi, she served in various capacities in the Ministry of External Affairs, including on the Western Europe desk. She served as a staff officer to the then Prime Minister of India, I.K. Gujral. She then served as the first woman Deputy Chief of Protocol (Ceremonial).

She served as Head of the Commercial Wing at the Embassy of India in Kathmandu where she was involved with negotiations leading to the revision of the India-Nepal Treaty of Trade. She then headed the Press and Culture Wing of the Indian High Commission in Colombo, where she was also Director of the Indian Cultural Centre. She was Deputy Spokesperson for the Ministry of External Affairs after returning to Delhi. She was then Director and later Joint Secretary in the Eurasia Division before moving to Bangkok as Deputy Chief of Mission.

In 2012, she was appointed Ambassador to Tunisia.

== Personal life ==
She is married with one son and one daughter. Her spouse, Farid Inam Mallick is a lawyer based in New Delhi. She speaks English, Hindi, Malayalam and French. Her interests are in Indian classical dance, English literature, fitness and nutrition.

== See also ==
- Syed Akbaruddin
