= Sainik School, Balachadi =

Sainik School Balachadi
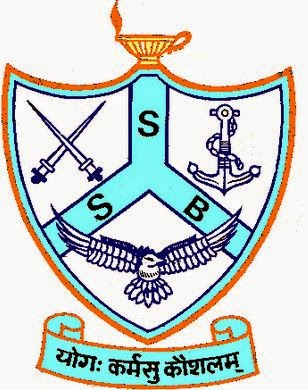

Location
- Jamnagar, Gujarat; India; 22°35′49.8″N 70°12′25.2″E

Information
- School type: Boarding School
- Motto: 'Yogah Karmasu Kaushalam'
- Established: July 1961
- Founder: Krishna Menon
- Authority: Ministry of Defence
- Principal: Col. Shreyash Mehta
- Faculty: 30
- Enrollment: 575
- Classes offered: sixth to 12th
- Campus size: 375 acres (152 ha)
- Houses: Pratap (Warriors); Garuda; Nehru; Angre; Sardar Patel; Shastri; Shivaji; Tagore
- Publication: Sandeshak
- School fees: 80000-90000 per annum
- Affiliations: CBSE
- Alumni: OBSSA Network
- Website: www.ssbalachadi.org

The Sainik School, Balachadi, in Jamnagar, Gujarat, is one of the leading Sainik Schools in the chain of Sainik Schools. It was established in July 1961 by the then Honorable Minister of Home Affairs, Shri Lal Bahadur Shastri. It is an English medium, fully residential boarding school for boys and girls, providing public education, with a military bias, up to 10+2 stage, as per the Central Board of Secondary Education.

Sainik Schools were a dream conceived by V K Krishna Menon, the then Defense Minister of India. The schools are run by the Government of India and managed by the Sainik School Society under the Government of India. The chain of Sainik Schools in India was established with the prime focus of strengthening the Armed Forces, the All India Civil Services IAS and the IPS, besides other fields of public service.

== Location ==
The school is 32 km (20 mi) from Jamnagar, alongside a coastal area in the Balachadi Estate. The approximately 900-acre (360 ha) campus is flanked by the Gulf of Kutch, encompassed by a Bungalow of the then ruler of Nawanagar, Maharaja Jam Shaheb Digvijaysinhji Ranjitsinhji, the Sachana Ship Breaking Yard and a natural coastal beach.

A campsite for the children of Polish refugees of World War II was built by K. S. Digvijaysinhji, Jam Saheb Maharaja of Nawanagar in 1942, near his summer resort. He gave refuge to hundreds of Polish children rescued from Polish and Soviet camps. The campsite is now a part of the Sainik School, Balachadi.

== National Cadet Corps ==
All the boys are enrolled into the National Cadet Corps and follow a combined syllabus of the three services (Army, Navy and Air Force). The school possesses a full-fledged NCC company.
