= Digvijaysinhji Ranjitsinhji Jadeja =

Maharaja of Nawanagar from 1933 to 1966

Digvijaysinhji Ranjitsinhji
- GCSI GCIE
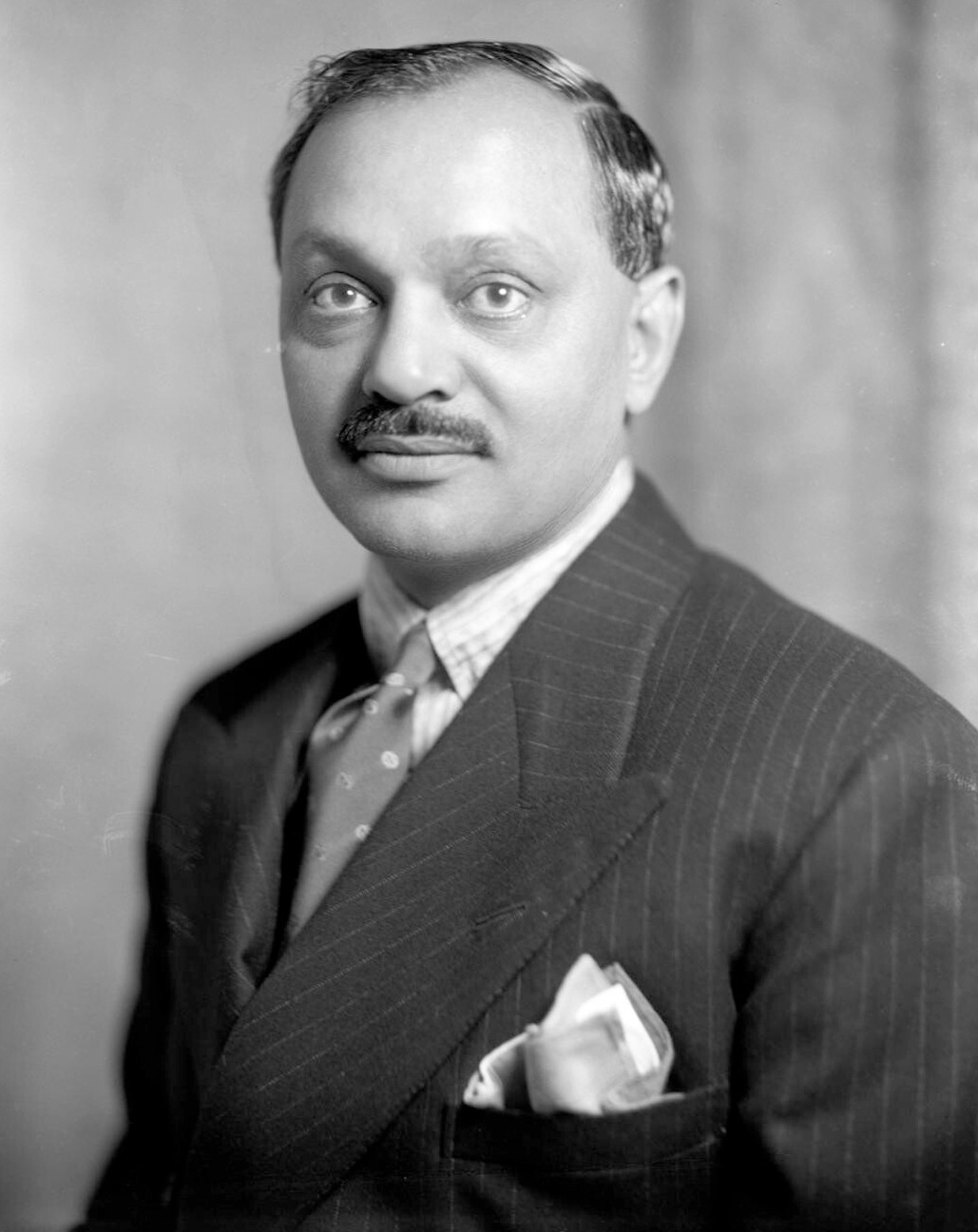
- Digvijaysinhji in 1935

Maharaja of Nawanagar
- Reign: 2 April 1933 – 3 February 1966
- Predecessor: Ranjitsinhji
- Successor: Shatrusalyasinhji
- Born: 18 September 1895; Sadodar, Nawanagar State, British India (now Jamnagar District, Gujarat, India)
- Died: 3 February 1966 (aged 70); Bombay, India
- Spouse: Maharajkumari Baiji Raj Shri Kanchan Kunverba Sahiba (m. 1923)
- Issue: Shatrusalyasinhji Jadeja
Names
- Digvijaysinhji Ranjitsinhji Jadeja
- House: Nawanagar
- Military career
- Branch: British Indian Army
- Service years: 1919–1947
- Cricket career

Cricket information
- Batting: Right-handed
- Bowling: Right-arm
- Role: Batsman

Domestic team information
- Years: Team
- 1933–1934: Western India

Career statistics
Competition	First-class
Matches	1
Runs scored	6
Batting average	3.00
100s/50s	0/0
Top score	6
Catches/stumpings	0/–
- Source: ESPNcricinfo, 8 June 2019

4th President of BCCI
- In office 1937–1938
- Preceded by: Sir Hamidullah Khan
- Succeeded by: P. Subbarayan

Sir Digvijaysinhji Ranjitsinhji Jadeja GCSI GCIE (18 September 1895 – 3 February 1966), known widely in Poland as the Good Maharaja (Polish: Dobry Maharadża), was the ruling Maharaja Jam Sahib of Nawanagar (present day Jamnagar), succeeding his uncle, the famed cricketer Ranjitsinhji. He ruled Nawanagar from 1933 to 1947, when Nawanagar was merged into the United State of Kathiawar, after which he held his title nominally.

Jadeja is personally credited with saving around 740 Polish orphans between 1942 and 1946, following the Invasion of Poland. While serving as the Hindu delegate to the British war cabinet he convinced members of the Red Cross and Anders' Army to transport the orphans to Jamnagar, where he provided them with food, shelter, clothes, education, and medical care in the nearby coastal village of Balachadi. Following the Surrender of Germany, the orphans were returned to Poland.

In 2011, Jadeja was posthumously bestowed the Commander's Cross of the Order of Merit by the President of Poland, and is honoured at the Good Maharaja Square in Warsaw.

== Biography ==
Digvijaysinhji Ranjitsinhji Jadeja was born on 18 September 1895 in the village of Sadodar (present-day Gujarat) during the British Raj. He was the nephew of the famed cricketer and Maharaja, Ranjitsinhji. He attended Rajkumar College in Rajkot as well as Malvern College and University College London.

Commissioned as second lieutenant in the British Indian Army in 1919, Jadeja enjoyed a military career for over a decade. Attached to the 125th Napier's Rifles (now 5th Battalion (Napier's), Rajputana Rifles) in 1920, he served with the Egyptian Expeditionary Force, subsequently receiving a promotion to Lieutenant in 1921. He then served with the Waziristan Field Force from 1922 to 1924; after a promotion to captain in 1929, he retired from the army in 1931. However, he would continue to receive honorary promotions in the Indian Army until 1947, ending with the rank of lieutenant-general.

=== Maharaja Jam Sahib ===
Following the death of his uncle, Jadeja became Maharaja Jam Sahib in 1933, continuing his uncle's policies of development and public service. He was knighted in 1935 and joined the Chamber of Princes, leading it as president from 1937 to 1943. Upholding the cricketing tradition of his uncle, he served as President of the Board of Control for Cricket in India in 1937 to 1938 and was a member of several prominent sporting clubs. He had previously played a single first-class match during the 1933–34 season, captaining Western India against the MCC during its tour of India and Ceylon. He scored 0 and 6 in his two innings, in what was also the only first-class match played by his brother, Pratapsinhji. During the Second World War, Jadeja served on the Imperial War Cabinet and the National Defence Council, along with the Pacific War Council.

=== Polish refugees ===
In 1942, he established the Polish Children's Camp in Balachadi for refugee Polish children who were brought out of the USSR during World War II.

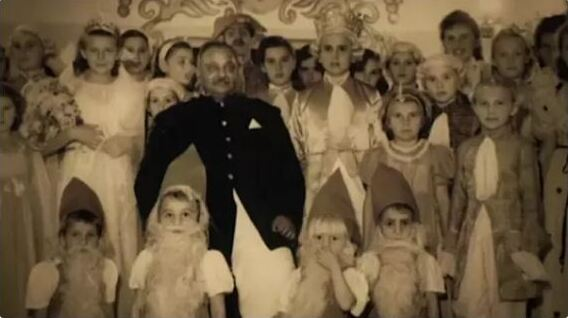
Maharaja Jadeja with Polish children on Christmas Eve

It existed until 1945, when it was closed and the children were transferred to Valivade, a quarter of the city of Kolhapur. The camp site today is part of 300 acre campus of the Sainik School Balachadi. The Jamsaheb Digvijay Singh Jadeja School in Warsaw was established to honour this legacy.

After the independence of India, he signed the Instrument of Accession to the Dominion of India on 15 August 1947. He merged Nawanagar into the United State of Kathiawar the following year, serving as its Rajpramukh, a Chief of State until the Government of India abolished the post in 1956.

=== League of Nations and United Nations delegate ===
Jadeja represented India as a delegate at the first session of the League of Nations in 1920.

He was also the Deputy Leader of the Indian delegation to the UN, and chaired both the UN Administration Tribunal and the UN Negotiating Committee on Korean Rehabilitation following the Korean War.

=== Death ===
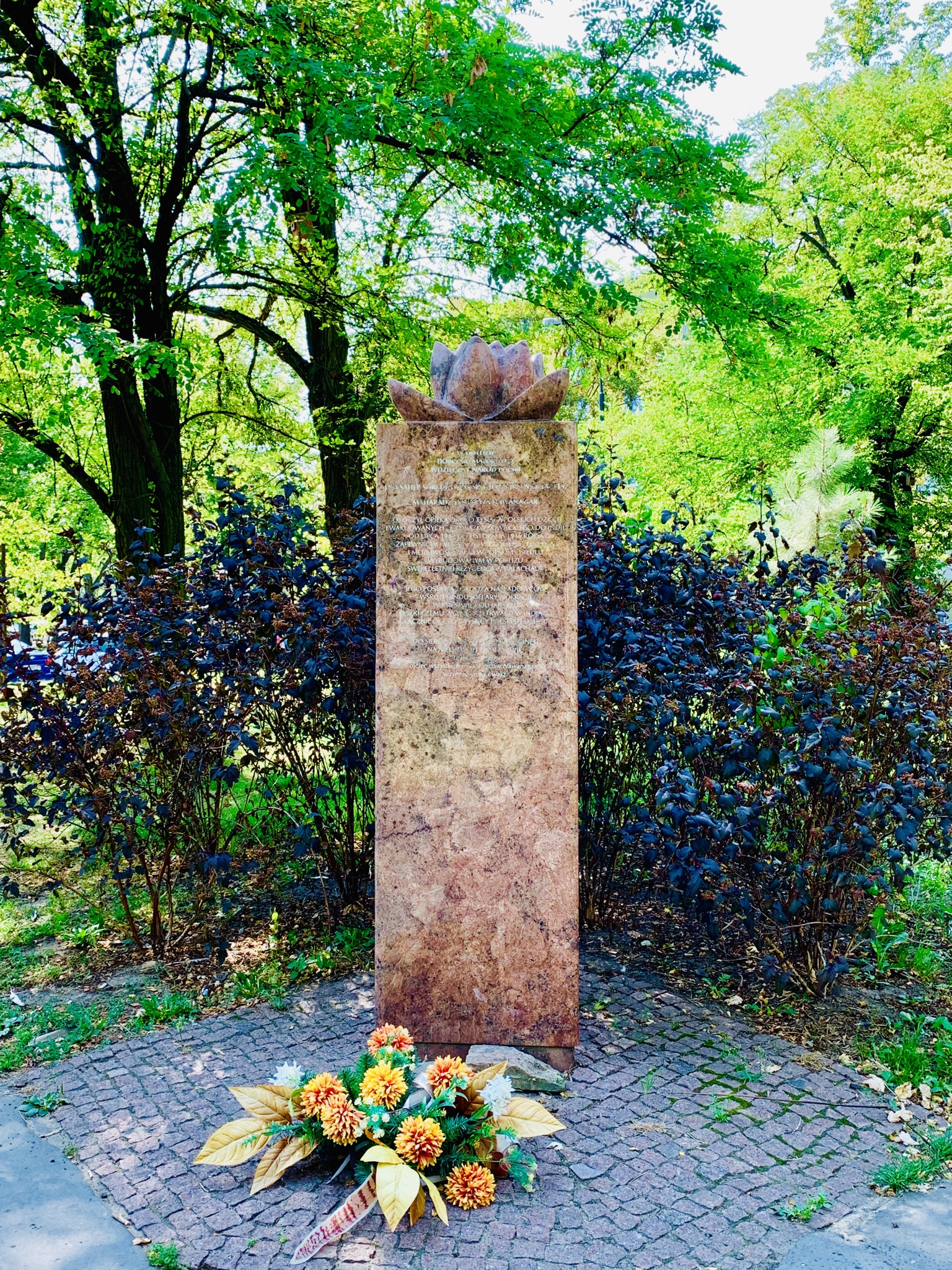
Memorial in Warsaw. The nearby "Good Maharaja's Square" was named after Digvijaysinhji Ranjitsinhji in recognition of his help to Polish refugees during World War II.

Jadeja died in Bombay on 3 February 1966, aged 70. He was survived by his only son, Shatrusalyasinhji, who was a first-class cricketer for Saurashtra.

=== Legacy ===
A 2015 documentary titled "Little Poland in India" was made in collaboration of both Indian and Polish governments to honour the efforts of Maharaja Jam Sahib and Kira Banasinska, who led the movement in India to rehabilitate Polish refugees. In 2025, a monument honoring Jadeja was installed in Nevatim, a community in southern Israel that has a sizable population of Jews from India.

== Honours ==

- India General Service Medal w/ Wazirstan Clasp-1924
- King George V Silver Jubilee Medal-1935
- King George VI Coronation Medal-1937
- Knight Grand Commander of the Order of the Indian Empire (GCIE)-1939
- 1939-1945 Star-1945
- Africa Star-1945
- Pacific Star-1945
- War Medal 1939-1945-1945
- Knight Grand Commander of the Order of the Star of India (GCSI)-1947 (KCSI-1935)
- India Service Medal-1945
- Order of the Star of India- 1947
- Indian Independence Medal-1947
- Commander's Cross of the Order of Merit of the Republic of Poland (posthumous) – 2011

== See also ==
- India–Poland relations

== Notes ==
Preceded by Jam Saheb Shri Ranjitsinhji	Jam Saheb of Nawanagar; 1933–1948	Succeeded by Merged with Dominion of India
