= Indrajitsinhji =

Indian cricketer (1937–2011)

Personal information
- Full name: Kumar Shri Madhavsinhji Jadeja Indrajitsinhji
- Born: 15 June 1937; Jamnagar, British India
- Died: 12 March 2011 (aged 73); Mumbai, India
- Batting: Right-handed
- Role: Wicket-keeper
- Relatives: Duleepsinhji (uncle); Ranjitsinhji (great uncle); Hanumant Singh (cousin); Suryaveer Singh (cousin)

International information
- National side: India
- Test debut (cap 109): 2 October 1964 v Australia
- Last Test: 15 October 1969 v New Zealand

Career statistics
Competition	Test	First-class
Matches	4	90
Runs scored	51	3694
Batting average	8.50	26.76
100s/50s	0/0	5/16
Top score	23	124
Catches/stumpings	6/3	133/80
- Source: ESPNcricinfo, 17 March 2011

Kumar Shri Indrajitsinhji Madhavsinhji (15 June 1937 – 12 March 2011) was an Indian cricketer who played in four Test matches from 1964 to 1969 as a wicket-keeper-batsman.

== Early life ==
Indrajitsinhji was born in Jamnagar, Gujarat. He was educated at the Rajkumar College and St. Stephen's College.

== Career ==
He played first-class cricket from 1954 to 1973, for Delhi and Saurashtra. He was one of the first wicketkeepers to pass 100 dismissals (caught or stumped) in the Ranji Trophy, and set a record by taking 23 dismissals in the competition in one year in the 1960–61 season.

Although an accomplished wicketkeeper in Indian domestic cricket, he was kept out of the India national cricket team by Farokh Engineer and Budhi Kunderan. He played in only four Test matches: the three-match series against Australia in 1964–65, and one Test against New Zealand at Hyderabad in 1969–70 when Engineer was injured.

He died in Mumbai at the age of 73.

== Personal life and family ==
His grandfather, Mohansinhji, was the brother of Ranjitsinhji and uncle of Duleepsinhji, both of whom also played Test cricket. His cousins included Suryaveer Singh and Hanumant Singh. He was educated at Rajkumar College, Rajkot.

=== Family tree ===
Descendants of Jivansinhji

Jivansinhji; 1846–1916
Devisinhji; 1865–?	Ranjitsinhji (Note: Test cricketers); 1872–1933	Juvansinhji; 1875–1942	Dilawarsinhji; 1883–1930	Mohansinhji; 1886–1941
Savaisinhji; 1889–?	Rajendrasinhji; 1899–1964	Pratapsinhji (Note: First-class cricketers); 1893–?	Digvijaysinhji; 1895–1966	Himmatsinhji; 1897–1973	Duleepsinhji; 1905–1959
Vikramsinhji	Sukhdevsinhji; 1936–	Daulatsinhji; 1935–	Chatrapalsinhji; 1936–2009	Shatrusalyasinhji; 1939–	Madhavsinhji
Dajirajsinhji; 1891–1917	Ajaysinhji; 1971–	Indravijaysinhji; 1915–1981	Ranvirsinhji; 1919–1962	Indrajitsinhji; 1937–2011
Yadvendrasinhji; 1916–?

Notes:
- Jam Sahibs of Nawanagar are underlined.
