= Ranvirsinhji =

Indian cricketer

Personal information
- Born: 7 October 1919; Nawanagar, British India
- Died: 4 April 1962 (aged 42); India
- Batting: Right-handed
- Bowling: Right-arm medium-pace
- Relatives: (see below)

Domestic team information
- Years: Team
- 1936-37 to 1946-47: Nawanagar
- 1950-51 to 1951-52: Services

Career statistics
Competition	FC
Matches	30
Runs scored	834
Batting average	17.37
100s/50s	0/1
Top score	53
Balls bowled	1527
Wickets	27
Bowling average	26.70
5 wickets in innings	1
10 wickets in match	0
Best bowling	6/84
Catches/stumpings	19/–
- Source: CricketArchive, 13 December 2014

Maharaj Shri Ranvirsinhji (7 October 1919 – 4 April 1962), a member of the Jamnagar royal family, played first-class cricket in India from 1936 to 1952. He toured Australia with the Indian team in 1947-48 but did not play Test cricket.

Ranvirsinhji made his first-class debut in 1936–37 at the age of 17, and played in the Nawanagar team that won the Ranji Trophy final a few months later, along with his brother Indravijaysinhji and their cousin Yadvendrasinhji. In 1937-38 he made his highest score, 53, opening the batting for Nawanagar in an innings victory over Sind.

He made 31 (top score) and 43 and took 6 for 84 when Nawanagar lost by an innings to Bombay in the Ranji Trophy in 1946–47. But overall, in three matches in 1946-47 he scored only 137 runs at an average of 27.40, and he was a surprise late inclusion in the Indian team that toured Australia in 1947-48. In his first match of the tour, against New South Wales, he was injured when a ball from Ray Lindwall struck him on the knee. Later on the tour he had trouble with his eyes, and a specialist in Melbourne had a pair of spectacles made for him. He played only two first-class matches and was the only member of the 17-man team who did not play any of the Tests.

After the tour he did not play first-class cricket until 1950–51, when he returned to play for two unsuccessful seasons with Services.

His son Prahlad Singh played five matches for Saurashtra from 1958 to 1967.

== Family tree ==
Descendants of Jivansinhji

Jivansinhji; 1846–1916
Devisinhji; 1865–?	Ranjitsinhji (Note: Test cricketers); 1872–1933	Juvansinhji; 1875–1942	Dilawarsinhji; 1883–1930	Mohansinhji; 1886–1941
Savaisinhji; 1889–?	Rajendrasinhji; 1899–1964	Pratapsinhji (Note: First-class cricketers); 1893–?	Digvijaysinhji; 1895–1966	Himmatsinhji; 1897–1973	Duleepsinhji; 1905–1959
Vikramsinhji	Sukhdevsinhji; 1936–	Daulatsinhji; 1935–	Chatrapalsinhji; 1936–2009	Shatrusalyasinhji; 1939–	Madhavsinhji
Dajirajsinhji; 1891–1917	Ajaysinhji; 1971–	Indravijaysinhji; 1915–1981	Ranvirsinhji; 1919–1962	Indrajitsinhji; 1937–2011
Yadvendrasinhji; 1916–?

Notes:
- Jam Sahibs of Nawanagar are underlined.
