= Yadvendrasinhji =

Indian cricketer (1916–?)

Personal information
- Born: c. December 1916
- Relatives: (see below)

Domestic team information
- Years: Team
- 1934-35 to 1935-36: Western India
- 1936-37 to 1947-48: Nawanagar

Career statistics
Competition	FC
Matches	25
Runs scored	841
Batting average	24.02
100s/50s	0/2
Top score	58
Balls bowled	174
Wickets	5
Bowling average	27.80
5 wickets in innings	0
10 wickets in match	0
Best bowling	1/9
Catches/stumpings	12/-
- Source: CricketArchive, 13 December 2014

Raj Kumar Yadvendrasinhji (c. December 1916 – ?), a member of the Jamnagar royal family, played first-class cricket in India from 1935 to 1947.

== Career ==
Yadvendrasinhji made his first-class debut in 1934–35, and played in the Nawanagar team that won the Ranji Trophy final in 1936–37, along with his cousins Indravijaysinhji and Ranvirsinhji. Batting at number nine, he made 39 not out and 45 not out, sharing a ninth-wicket partnership of 76 in the first innings with Ranvirsinhji, and a tenth-wicket partnership of 133 in 96 minutes in the second innings with Mubarak Ali.

He continued to play for Nawanagar with moderate success until 1947–48. He twice made his highest score of 58. In 1945–46, against Baroda, he made 58 and 27 and took a wicket in each innings. In his next match, in 1946–47, he top-scored with 58 in the second innings when Nawanagar lost by an innings to Bombay.

== Family tree ==
Descendants of Jivansinhji

Jivansinhji; 1846–1916
Devisinhji; 1865–?	Ranjitsinhji (Note: Test cricketers); 1872–1933	Juvansinhji; 1875–1942	Dilawarsinhji; 1883–1930	Mohansinhji; 1886–1941
Savaisinhji; 1889–?	Rajendrasinhji; 1899–1964	Pratapsinhji (Note: First-class cricketers); 1893–?	Digvijaysinhji; 1895–1966	Himmatsinhji; 1897–1973	Duleepsinhji; 1905–1959
Vikramsinhji	Sukhdevsinhji; 1936–	Daulatsinhji; 1935–	Chatrapalsinhji; 1936–2009	Shatrusalyasinhji; 1939–	Madhavsinhji
Dajirajsinhji; 1891–1917	Ajaysinhji; 1971–	Indravijaysinhji; 1915–1981	Ranvirsinhji; 1919–1962	Indrajitsinhji; 1937–2011
Yadvendrasinhji; 1916–?

Notes:
- Jam Sahibs of Nawanagar are underlined.
