= Indravijaysinhji =

Indian cricketer

Personal information
- Full name: Indravijaysinhji
- Born: 24 April 1915; Jamnagar, British India
- Died: 14 June 1981 (aged 66); Jamnagar, Gujarat, India
- Relatives: (see below)

Domestic team information
- Years: Team
- 1935: Western India
- 1936–1943: Nawanagar
- 1953: Saurashtra

Career statistics
Competition	FC
Matches	28
Runs scored	1039
Batting average	25.97
100s/50s	1/3
Top score	121*
Balls bowled	42
Wickets	0
Bowling average	n/a
5 wickets in innings	0
10 wickets in match	0
Best bowling	0/7
Catches/stumpings	16/-
- Source: CricketArchive, 17 October 2014

Rajkumar Shri Indravijaysinhji Dilawarsinhji Jadeja (24 April 1915 – 14 June 1981) was an Indian cricketer. A descendant of the ruling family of Nawanagar State, and a nephew of Ranjitsinhji, who played Test cricket for England, Indravijaysinhji was introduced to cricket at the Rajkumar College, Rajkot where most of his family had been educated. He went on to play Ranji Trophy matches for Western India, Nawanagar, and Saurashtra, captaining Nawanagar. He also appeared for several combined teams against touring international sides, and finished his career with 28 first-class matches and a single first-class century.

== Early life and family ==
Indravijaysinhji was a son of Maharaj Shri Dilawarsinhji (1883–1930). His father's family were prominent in Sarodar (or Sadodar), a village in Nawanagar State on Gujarat's Kathiawar peninsula. His paternal grandfather was descended from the Jam Sahibs of Nawanagar, and his paternal grandmother was a daughter of Takhatsinhji, the Maharaja of Jodhpur. Indravijaysinhji was educated at the Rajkumar College in neighbouring Rajkot State. The family were prominent in cricketing circles – his uncle, Ranjitsinhji, and first cousin, Duleepsinhji, played Test cricket for England, while three other first cousins played first-class cricket. Indravijaysinhji was briefly an officer in the British Indian Army, with the rank of lieutenant.

== Sporting career ==
Indravijaysinhji made his first-class cricket debut at the age of 19, during the inaugural 1934–35 edition of the Ranji Trophy. He appeared for a combined Western India side, playing little part in the game, and also played a first-class match for the Cricket Club of India against Bombay late in the season. Indravijaysinhji played two further matches for Western India in the following season of the Ranji Trophy, under the captaincy of the Ghulam Moinuddin Khan, Nawab KhanSaheb of Manavadar. From the 1936–37 tournament, a Nawanagar team participated, for whom he made most of his first-class appearances.

A middle or lower-order batsman, Indravijaysinhji's first notable innings came during the final of the 1936–37 Ranji Trophy, in which Nawanagar defeated Bengal by 256 runs to win its only title. After a duck in the first innings, he top-scored in the second, making 91 runs. Indravijaysinhji served as captain of Nawanagar in seven matches, from 1938 to 1941, of which the team won three, drew three, and lost one. Nawanagar's team at times included Indravijaysinhji; his brothers, Ranvirsinhji, Yadvendrasinhji, Jayendrasinhji. The side's most notable player during this time was Vinoo Mankad, who later played at Test level for India. Playing against Sindh during the 1938–39 tournament, Indravijaysinhji scored his only first-class century, an innings of 121 not out.

Indravijaysinhji's final Ranji Trophy match for Nawanagar came during the 1943–44 season. Outside of Indian domestic competition, he had also appeared for several combined teams against touring international sides, playing against the touring Australians during the 1935–36 season and a touring English team led by Lord Tennyson during the 1937–38 season. Nine years after his previous first-class appearance, now aged 38, Indravijaysinhji played one final match for a Saurashtra team in the 1953–54 Ranji Trophy. He finished his first-class career with 1,039 runs made at an average of 25.97, with no wickets and 16 catches. Indravijaysinhji died in Jamnagar in June 1981.

Descendants of Jivansinhji

Jivansinhji; 1846–1916
Devisinhji; 1865–?	Ranjitsinhji (Note: Test cricketers); 1872–1933	Juvansinhji; 1875–1942	Dilawarsinhji; 1883–1930	Mohansinhji; 1886–1941
Savaisinhji; 1889–?	Rajendrasinhji; 1899–1964	Pratapsinhji (Note: First-class cricketers); 1893–?	Digvijaysinhji; 1895–1966	Himmatsinhji; 1897–1973	Duleepsinhji; 1905–1959
Vikramsinhji	Sukhdevsinhji; 1936–	Daulatsinhji; 1935–	Chatrapalsinhji; 1936–2009	Shatrusalyasinhji; 1939–	Madhavsinhji
Dajirajsinhji; 1891–1917	Ajaysinhji; 1971–	Indravijaysinhji; 1915–1981	Ranvirsinhji; 1919–1962	Indrajitsinhji; 1937–2011
Yadvendrasinhji; 1916–?

Notes:
- Jam Sahibs of Nawanagar are underlined.
