= Sukhdevsinhji =

Indian cricketer

Personal information
- Full name: Sukhdevsinhji
- Born: 6 June 1936 (age 90)
- Relatives: (see below)

Domestic team information
- Years: Team
- 1953: Baroda

Career statistics
Competition	FC
Matches	1
Runs scored	3
Batting average	3.00
100s/50s	0/0
Top score	3
Catches/stumpings	16/-
- Source: CricketArchive, 17 October 2014

Rajkumar Shri Sukhdevsinhji Rajendrasinhji Jadeja (born 6 June 1936), known professionally as R. K. Sukhdevsinhji, is an Indian businessman and former cricketer. Sukhdevsinhji played a single first-class match for Baroda during the 1953–54 season, aged 17. His father, General Rajendrasinhji, was descended from the ruling family of Nawanagar State, and many other members of his family played cricket at high levels. Sukhdevsinhji later studied economics at St. Stephen's College, Delhi, and has held a variety of positions with companies in India's oil and gas sector, most notably as chairman of Bharat Petroleum.

== Early life and family ==
Sukhdevsinhji's father, General Rajendrasinhji, was a high-ranking officer in the post-independence Indian Army, and was both the last Commander-in-Chief and the first Chief of the Army Staff. Descended from the Jam Sahibs of Nawanagar, his father's family were prominent in Sarodar (or Sadodar), a village in Nawanagar State on Gujarat's Kathiawar peninsula. Ranitsinhji had played Test cricket for England, and a number of other members of the family played cricket. As with his father and most other male members of his family, Sukhdevsinhji schooling was at the Rajkumar College in Rajkot.

== Sporting career ==
A representative Commonwealth XI cricket team, captained by Australian Ben Barnett, toured India during the 1953–54 season. The tour began in western India, with the team's third match coming against Baroda, a Ranji Trophy side sponsored by and featuring Fatehsinghrao Gaekwad, the ruling Maharajah Gaekwad of Baroda State. Aged 17, Sukhdevsinhji was selected to appear for Baroda in the match, in what was to be his only game at first-class level. Batting ninth in Baroda's first innings, he made three runs before being dismissed by Jim McConnon, who played two Tests for England the following season. Vijay Hazare, Baroda's captain and a Test player for India, scored 175 not out in the same innings, and he and Sukhdevsinhji featured in an 18-run partnership for the eighth wicket. However, the match finished in a draw after three days. Sukhdevsinhji remained involved in cricket long after the conclusion of his playing career, and at one stage was on the executive committee of the Cricket Club of India.

== Business career ==
Sukhdevsinhji attended St. Stephen's College at the University of Delhi, studying economics. He was initially employed with India's Ministry of Petroleum and Natural Gas, and served as a director of the ministry's Oil Coordination Committee (OCC). Sukhdevsinhji has held board-level positions in a number of government corporations and publicly traded companies, including:

- Chairman of Bharat Petroleum Corporation Ltd. (and previously managing director), a state-controlled oil and gas corporation
- Chairman of Jhagadia Copper Ltd., a copper mining firm
- Managing Director of Essar Oil Ltd., an oil and gas firm
- Non-Executive Director of Asahi Songwon Colors Ltd., a pigment manufacturing firm
- Non-Executive Director of Swan Energy Ltd., an energy firm

Sukhdevsinhji is married to Vijaylakshmi Kumari, a daughter of Rao Narayan Singh Saheb, the Thakur of Masuda in Ajmer-Merwara.

Descendants of Jivansinhji

Jivansinhji; 1846–1916
Devisinhji; 1865–?	Ranjitsinhji (Note: Test cricketers); 1872–1933	Juvansinhji; 1875–1942	Dilawarsinhji; 1883–1930	Mohansinhji; 1886–1941
Savaisinhji; 1889–?	Rajendrasinhji; 1899–1964	Pratapsinhji (Note: First-class cricketers); 1893–?	Digvijaysinhji; 1895–1966	Himmatsinhji; 1897–1973	Duleepsinhji; 1905–1959
Vikramsinhji	Sukhdevsinhji; 1936–	Daulatsinhji; 1935–	Chatrapalsinhji; 1936–2009	Shatrusalyasinhji; 1939–	Madhavsinhji
Dajirajsinhji; 1891–1917	Ajaysinhji; 1971–	Indravijaysinhji; 1915–1981	Ranvirsinhji; 1919–1962	Indrajitsinhji; 1937–2011
Yadvendrasinhji; 1916–?

Notes:
- Jam Sahibs of Nawanagar are underlined.
