= Chatrapalsinhji =

Indian cricketer (1936–2009)

Personal information
- Born: 4 November 1936; Jamnagar, Gujarat, India
- Died: 29 April 2009 (aged 72); Ahmedabad, Gujarat
- Batting: Right-handed
- Relatives: Ajay Jadeja (nephew); Shatrusalyasinhji (cousin)

Domestic team information
- Years: Team
- 1957: Delhi
- 1958–1966: Saurashtra
- 1967–1970: Bihar
- 1971: Gujarat

Career statistics
Competition	First-class
Matches	37
Runs scored	1363
Batting average	23.10
100s/50s	0/8
Top score	98
Catches/stumpings	14/–
- Source: CricketArchive, 28 March 2014

Rajkumar Shri Chatrapalsinhji, later known as R.K. Chatrapalsinh Jadeja (4 November 1936 – 29 April 2009), a member of the Jamnagar royal family, played first-class cricket in India from 1957 to 1971.

== Education and cricket career ==
Chatrapalsinhji was educated at Rajkumar College, Rajkot, and Delhi University, where he opened the batting for the university team in the Rohinton Baria Trophy from 1955-56 to 1957-58. He made his first-class debut for Delhi in the Ranji Trophy in 1957-58. In his second match he scored 69 in the second innings, taking part in an opening partnership of 114 when Delhi successfully chased 136 for victory.

He returned to play for his home team Saurashtra in 1958-59, scoring 246 runs in four matches at an average of 30.75. He made his highest score of 98 against Gujarat in 1962-63, a drawn match in which two other members of the Jamnagar royal family, Indrajitsinhji and Shatrusalyasinhji, were also successful for Saurashtra.

From 1967-68 to 1969-70 he played for Bihar. In 1968-69 he was chosen to represent East Zone in his only appearance in the Duleep Trophy. In a low-scoring match he was East Zone's top scorer, with 42 and 10, in a loss to South Zone. He played one final match, for Gujarat, in 1971-72.

== Career with Air India ==
Chatrapalsinhji's work as an officer with Air India took him around India and the Gulf States. He was the instigator of the 1989 Nehru Cup international cricket tournament.

Descendants of Jivansinhji

Jivansinhji; 1846–1916
Devisinhji; 1865–?	Ranjitsinhji (Note: Test cricketers); 1872–1933	Juvansinhji; 1875–1942	Dilawarsinhji; 1883–1930	Mohansinhji; 1886–1941
Savaisinhji; 1889–?	Rajendrasinhji; 1899–1964	Pratapsinhji (Note: First-class cricketers); 1893–?	Digvijaysinhji; 1895–1966	Himmatsinhji; 1897–1973	Duleepsinhji; 1905–1959
Vikramsinhji	Sukhdevsinhji; 1936–	Daulatsinhji; 1935–	Chatrapalsinhji; 1936–2009	Shatrusalyasinhji; 1939–	Madhavsinhji
Dajirajsinhji; 1891–1917	Ajaysinhji; 1971–	Indravijaysinhji; 1915–1981	Ranvirsinhji; 1919–1962	Indrajitsinhji; 1937–2011
Yadvendrasinhji; 1916–?

Notes:
- Jam Sahibs of Nawanagar are underlined.
