= Nathu Singh Rathore =

Indian general (1902–1994)

Lieutenant General Nathu Singh Rathore
- Born: 22 April 1900; Gumanpura, Dungarpur, Rajasthan
- Died: 5 November 1994 (aged 94); Gumanpura, Dungarpur, Rajasthan
- Relatives: Ran Vijay Singh (son)
- Military career
- Allegiance: British India (1922–1947); India (from 1947)
- Branch: British Indian Army (1922–1947); Indian Army (1947–1954)
- Service years: 1922–1954
- Rank: Lieutenant General
- Unit: Rajput Regiment
- Commands: Eastern Command
- Conflicts: World War II; Indo-Pakistani War of 1947

Nathu Singh Rathore was an Indian Army officer from Gumanpura, Rajasthan.

== Early years ==
Nathu Singh Rathore was born in 1900, although official records say he was born on 10 May 1902 at Gumanpura in the princely state of Dungarpur. He was the only son of Hamir Singhji Mertiya and was a descendant of Jaimal Rathore of Merta. He lost his parents at a young age and grew up under the guardianship of Maharawal Vijay Singh of Dungarpur. He was educated at Mayo College, and later at the Royal Military College, Sandhurst in England to be trained as an officer to serve in the Mewar Army, on the request of Rajmata of Dungarpur.

== Career ==
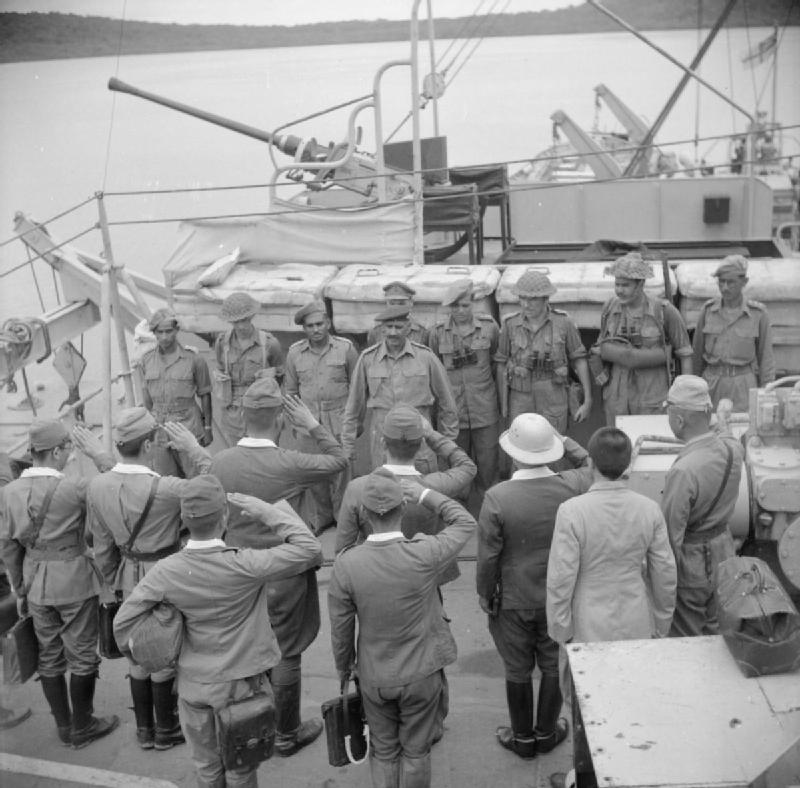
Surrender of the Japanese to Nathu Singh aboard HMS Rocksand in 1945

Singh was the second Indian officer to graduate from Sandhurst, after Rajendrasinhji Jadeja. After serving in the Mewar army, he was commissioned to the Rajput Regiment in 1925. He served at various places including Afghanistan and the Deccan. At Staff College, Camberley, he scored a still-record 935 out of 1000 in strategy. He served as the commander of a battalion of the Rajput regiment in Burma during the Second World War.

During Second World War, the Andaman and Nicobar islands were invaded by Japan. The Japanese captured Port Blair on 23 March 1942 and established control over the islands. The Japanese vice admiral Teizo Hara and major general Tamenori Sato surrendered to lieutenant colonel Nathu Singh on 15 August 1945 aboard the Royal Navy ship HMS Rocksand. On 7 October 1945, the territory was officially handed back to British brigadier J. A. Salomons, commander of the 116th Indian Infantry Brigade, and chief administrator Noel Patterson, in a ceremony at the Gymkhana Ground in Port Blair.

After the Indian independence, Singh climbed the military hierarchy of the Indian Army. In 1949, he was considered for the post of Commander-in-Chief of the army to replace Roy Bucher by defence minister Baldev Singh. Later, K. M. Cariappa, who was senior to Singh, was chosen for the post. Singh was appointed the inspector general of training and evaluation, and later served as the commander of the Eastern Army, from 1951 to 1954.

== Honours and decorations ==

	India General Service Medal (Mohmand 1933)	1939–1945 Star	
Burma Star	War Medal 1939–1945	India Service Medal 1939–1945	Indian Independence Medal

== Bibliography ==
- Singh, V. K. (2005). Leadership in the Indian army: biographies of twelve soldiers. ISBN 978-0-761-93322-9.
