= Admiral Singh =

Admiral Singh may refer to:

- Ajendra Bahadur Singh (fl. 1980s–2020s), Indian Navy vice admiral
- Karambir Singh (born 1959), Indian Navy admiral
- Kirpal Singh (Indian Navy officer) (1925–2021), Indian Navy rear admiral
- Madhvendra Singh (fl. 1950s–1990s), Indian Navy admiral
- Ran Vijay Singh (1932–1971), Indian Navy rear admiral
- Ravneet Singh (vice admiral) (fl. 1980s–2020s), Indian Navy vice admiral
- Sanjay Jasjit Singh (fl. 1980s–2020s), Indian Navy vice admiral
