= Budhi Kunderan =

Indian cricketer

Personal information
- Full name: Budhisagar Krishnappa Kunderan
- Born: 2 October 1939. Mulki, British India
- Died: 23 June 2006 (aged 66); Glasgow, Scotland
- Batting: Right-handed
- Bowling: Right-arm medium
- Role: Wicketkeeper-batsman

International information
- National side: India (1960–1967)
- Test debut (cap 96): 1 January 1960 v Australia
- Last Test: 13 July 1967 v England

Career statistics
Competition	Test	First-class
Matches	18	129
Runs scored	981	5,708
Batting average	32.70	28.97
100s/50s	2/3	12/19
Top score	192	205
Balls bowled	24	219
Wickets	0	3
Bowling average	–	53.33
5 wickets in innings	–	0
10 wickets in match	–	0
Best bowling	–	2/15
Catches/stumpings	23/7	176/85
- Source: CricketArchive, 1 November 2019

Budhisagar Krishnappa Kunderan (born Budhisagar Krishnappa Kunderam 2 October 1939 – 23 June 2006) was an Indian cricketer. He played as a wicket keeper for the most of his career, and was an exciting but unorthodox right-handed batsman who competed for international selection with contemporary Farokh Engineer. In his eighteen Tests between 1960 and 1967, he scored 981 runs with two centuries and a batting average of 32.70. With the gloves he took 23 catches and executed seven stumpings.

== Career ==
=== Early matches ===
Budhi Kunderan made his first-class debut for the Cricket Club of India against the touring West Indies in 1958–59. After just two first class matches, he was picked to play Test cricket for India against Australia in the next year. Through the fifties India had wicket keepers of about the same quality in Naren Tamhane, Probir Sen and Nana Joshi. Joshi and Tamhane had already been tried when Kunderan got his chance in the third Test. Kunderan got out hit wicket on his first appearance while attempting to pull Ian Meckiff but scored 71 and 33 in his next Test.

Kunderan had already played three Test matches when he made his Ranji Trophy debut in 1960 and scored 205 for Railways against Jammu-Kashmir. That was one of eight double-centuries scored by players making their Ranji Trophy debuts. He scored his second first-class hundred later in the year against the same opponents in a match that Railways won without losing a wicket. The Sino-Indian War put him temporarily out of action as the teams he represented, Railways and Services, were withdrawn from the competition; he just played one Ranji match.

=== Playing in the 1960s ===
From the early 1960s, Kunderan had a new competitor for the wicket keeping position in Farokh Engineer. Both played in the series against England at home and toured West Indies in 1961–62. Engineer was selected ahead of Kunderan when England again visited India in 1963–64, but he was found medically unfit on the eve of the first Test at Madras. Opening the innings, Kunderan hit 192 with 31 fours, 170 of which came on the first day of the match. He scored another hundred at Delhi and finished with an aggregate of 525 runs in the series. Since this series, only two other wicket keepers have scored more than 500 runs in a Test series – Denis Lindsay, 606 for South Africa v Australia in 1966-67 and Andy Flower, 540 for Zimbabwe v India in 2000–01.

Kunderan's wicket-keeping was perceived to have slipped, however, and the selectors left him out of all three Tests against Australia in 1964, replacing him with K. S. Indrajitsinhji. Engineer was then recalled for the New Zealand series that followed while Kunderan played as an opening batsman in the place of injured Dilip Sardesai.

In 1965, Kunderan left his job in the Railways and appeared for Mysore and the South Zone. A side effect of this was that he was able to keep wickets to the bowling of Chandrasekhar, Prasanna and Venkatraghavan in domestic matches. Recalled against West Indies in 1966–67, Kunderan scored 79 in 92 minutes in the Bombay Test. Early on in the innings, he appeared to have been caught by Garry Sobers but as the batsman prepared to depart, Sobers indicated that he had taken the catch on the bounce. One Test later, Kunderan again found himself out of the team.

The team that toured England in 1967 included both Kunderan and Engineer, but from here Engineer asserted himself as the primary 'keeper. Kunderan played purely as a batsman in the second and third Tests of the series. When Sardesai retired with a hand injury in the Lord's Test, he opened with Engineer and topscored with 47 out of India's 110 all out. He opened both batting and bowling at Birmingham where India played four spinners. This was to be Kunderan's last Test.

=== Style ===
Kunderan rose to fame when he scored 71 at a run a minute against the 1959–60 Australians at the Chepauk Stadium. He was noted for his "outrageous" strokes. Like Farokh Engineer, Kunderan had a knack for taking difficult catches while dropping easier ones.

=== Post-international career ===
He served as a professional in the Lancashire league and then with Drumpellier in the Western Union in Scotland. In the early 1980s, he played for Scotland in the Benson and Hedges Cup in England. Kunderan lived in Scotland from the turn of the 1970s. His brother Bharat, also a wicket-keeper, played first class cricket for Indian Universities in 1970–71.

Budhi Kunderan died from lung cancer at the age of 66. In June 2018, he was awarded with a Special Award by the Board of Control for Cricket in India (BCCI).
