= Bhanji Dal Jadeja =

Indian military commander

Bhanji Jadeja, also known as Bhanji Dal Jadeja, was a commander of the Nawanagar State army and jagirdar of Guana jagir. He commanded Jam Sataji's force during the Mughal attack on Junagadh State and defeated the attack.

After Vibhaji, Jam Sataji 1 became the king of Nawanagar. He defeated Emperor Akbar of Delhi twice in the battle of Junagadh near ‘Majevadi’ village ground in 1633. Chasing and defeating Muzaffarshah-III in a battle with Moghul Army with 3335 horses and 52 elephants. They were captured by Jam Sattaji’s commander in chief Bhanji Dal Jadeja.

As a revenge, Akbar attacked Jam Sattaji in 1640 again near Tamachan village, near the present Und irrigation dam, but he was badly defeated. Later, a furious Akbar replaced Suba of Ahmedabad with Aziz Koko as new governor ‘subo’ and attacked Bhanji Jadeja for the third time with an army of 90,000 soldiers. In the battle of Bhucharmori, near Dhrol, Jam Sattaji was defeated but Akbar compromised after an year and half and Jam Sattaji became the king of Nawanagar again.

In Akbarnaama, Akbar wrote “Satta was very powerful and notorious king keeping an army of 30,000”.
