= Farokh Engineer =

Indian cricketer (born 1938)

Personal information
- Full name: Farokh Maneksha Engineer
- Born: 25 February 1938 (age 88); Bombay, Bombay Province, British India
- Batting: Right-handed
- Role: Wicket-keeper-batsman

International information
- National side: India (1961–1975)
- Test debut (cap 102): 1 December 1961 v England
- Last Test: 23 January 1975 v West Indies
- ODI debut (cap 3): 13 July 1974 v England
- Last ODI: 14 June 1975 v New Zealand

Domestic team information
- Years: Team
- 1959/60–1974/75: Bombay
- 1961/62–1974/75: West Zone
- 1968–1976: Lancashire

Career statistics
Competition	Test	ODI	FC	LA
Matches	46	5	335	160
Runs scored	2,611	114	13,436	3,008
Batting average	31.08	38.00	29.52	23.31
100s/50s	2/16	0/1	13/69	0/12
Top score	121	54*	192	93
Catches/stumpings	66/16	3/1	704/120	159/31
- Source: CricketArchive (subscription required), 15 December 2023

Signature
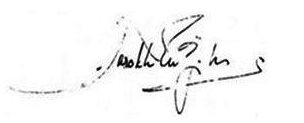

Farokh Maneksha Engineer (born 25 February 1938) is an Indian former cricketer. He was a wicket-keeper-batsman, usually an opening batsman, who represented India in 46 Test matches from 1961 to 1975. In first-class cricket, he played for Bombay from 1959/60 to 1974/75, for West Zone from 1961/62 to 1974/75, and for Lancashire County Cricket Club from 1968 to 1976. He was the first-choice wicket-keeper for the Rest of the World team which toured England in 1970 and Australia in 1971–72. Engineer is the first Man of the Match for India in the Men's Cricket World Cup because of his performance (54* & a catch) against East Africa in the 1975 Cricket World Cup.

Engineer is the last male member of the Parsi community to have played for India, although Arzan Nagwaswalla was selected for the international squad in 2021.

== Early life ==
=== Education and beginning of cricket career ===
Engineer was born 25 February 1938 into a Parsi family in Bombay. His father Manecksha was a doctor by profession, and his mother, Minnie was a housewife. Engineer studied at the Don Bosco High School in Matunga and later at Podar College, also in Matunga. Engineer became a student at the University of Bombay and, in 1958/59, played cricket for both their team and the Indian Universities team. He joined Bombay in 1959, though he continued to play for the Universities until 1961/62.

During his childhood, Engineer's first ambition was to be a pilot. However, he developed a love for sports from his father who played tennis and was himself a club cricketer. Farokh's older brother, Darius, was also a good club cricketer. He once took Farokh to the East Stand of the Brabourne Stadium, where they saw Denis Compton fielding. Farokh called to Compton who gave him a piece of chewing gum which he saved as his prized possession for many years. His father enrolled him in Dadar Parsi Colony Sporting Club where he learned the nuances of the game from the seniors and later became a regular member of the team.

== Test career ==
NOTE: All content in this section was moved to workspace because of sourcing and POV issues. A rewrite is in progress.

Engineer played in 46 Test matches for India from 1961/62 to 1974/75. He also played in five ODIs, all in 1974/75. He scored 2,611 runs in Tests, including two centuries with a highest score of 121. He took 66 catches and completed 16 stumpings.

=== Debut ===
Engineer made his Test debut on 1 December 1961 when India played England at the Modi Stadium in Kanpur. It was the second Test of the 1961/62 series. Engineer replaced Budhi Kunderan as wicket-keeper in the Indian team, and these two players competed for the role until Kunderan's retirement in 1967. The first Test, played three weeks earlier, had been drawn. India, captained by Nari Contractor, won the toss at Kanpur and batted first. Engineer was ninth man in at 414/7 and joined Polly Umrigar. They added 53 for the eighth wicket until Engineer was stumped by John Murray for 33. Contractor declared as soon as the wicket fell with India on 467/8 and Umrigar 147 not out. Engineer's first dismissal as a Test wicket-keeper was England opener Peter Richardson, whom he caught off Subhash Gupte for 22. Engineer later caught David Allen off Chandu Borde. England were all out for 244 and Contractor enforced the follow-on. With well over a day's play remaining, India hoped to dismiss England again and win the match, but England recovered well to score 497/5 with centuries by Geoff Pullar, Ken Barrington, and their captain Ted Dexter. The match ended in a draw.

== Lancashire ==
"He finds both cricket and life fun; he laughs easily and his jokes are often very funny but he can be grave. His appeals are as loud as anyone's yet off the field he is quietly spoken. As a batsman or wicketkeeper he is aggressive, yet he is a man of consideration and courtesy. There has always been a quality of generosity about his cricket and his way of life".

— Farokh – The Cricketing Cavalier by John Arlott

In 1968, when English cricket allowed its county clubs to sign overseas players, Engineer joined Lancashire alongside West Indies batsman Clive Lloyd. He spent nine seasons there, until he retired in 1976. Lancashire had not won a major honour since 1950 but, while Engineer and Lloyd played for them, they became a highly successful limited overs team, winning the Gillette Cup four times and the John Player League twice.

Engineer was playing for Lancashire in 1970 when he was selected as wicket-keeper for the Rest of the World team, captained by Garfield Sobers, which played five unofficial Tests against England that summer. Engineer also played for the Rest of the World cricket team in Australia in 1971–72. He enjoyed life in Manchester and, having married a local lady, decided to settle there after his retirement from playing. Lancashire granted him a testimonial in 1976, his final season, which raised £26,519.

He became a vice-president of the club in later years. On 24 January 2024, at a Naman Awards ceremony, the BCCI announced that the Colonel C. K. Nayudu Lifetime Achievement Award was bestowed on both Engineer and Ravi Shastri. His contributions to Lancashire county club were recognised as a stand was inaugurated in his name during the fourth test match of the Anderson–Tendulkar Trophy between England and India.

== In popular culture ==
The Bollywood film 83, released in 2021, was about India's first Cricket World Cup win in 1983. It depicts Engineer, resident in England at the time, as one of the TV commentators. The film features Boman Irani as Engineer and is directed and produced by Kabir Khan and Anurag Kashyap respectively.
