= International cricket in 1929–30 =

International cricket season

The 1929–30 international cricket season was from September 1929 to April 1930.

== Season overview ==
International tours
Start date	Home team	Away team	Results [Matches]			
Start date	Home team	Away team	Test	ODI	FC	LA
31 October 1929	Australia	Marylebone	—	—	2–2 [5]	—
26 December 1929	Ceylon	India	—	—	1–0 [1]	—
10 January 1930	New Zealand	England	0–1 [4]	—	—	—
11 January 1930	West Indies	England	1–1 [4]	—	—	—
18 March 1930	Argentina	England	—	—	0–1 [3]	—
3 April 1930	Ceylon	Australia	—	—	0–0 [1]	—

== October ==
=== MCC in Australia ===
First-class Series
No.	Date	Home captain	Away captain	Venue	Result
Match 1	31 Oct–2 November	(Western Australia) Harold Rowe	Harold Gilligan	WACA Ground, Perth	Marylebone by 7 wickets
Match 2	8–12 November	(South Australia) Vic Richardson	Harold Gilligan	Adelaide Oval, Adelaide	Marylebone by 239 runs
Match 3	15–19 November	(Victoria (state)) Jack Ryder	Harold Gilligan	Melbourne Cricket Ground, Melbourne	Victoria by 7 wickets
Match 4	22–26 November	(New South Wales) Alan Kippax	Harold Gilligan	Sydney Cricket Ground, Sydney	Match drawn
Match 5	29 Nov–2 December	(Queensland) Leo O'Connor	Harold Gilligan	The Gabba, Brisbane	Queensland by 7 wickets

== December ==
=== Bombay XI in Ceylon ===
First-class match
No.	Date	Home captain	Away captain	Venue	Result
Match	26–28 December	Churchill Gunasekara	Vithal Palwankar	Nondescripts Cricket Club Ground, Colombo	(Dominion of Ceylon) Rockwood's All Ceylon XI by 9 wickets

== January ==
=== England in New Zealand ===
Test Series
No.	Date	Home captain	Away captain	Venue	Result
Test 186	10–13 January	Tom Lowry	Harold Gilligan	AMI Stadium, Christchurch	England by 8 wickets
Test 188	24–27 January	Tom Lowry	Harold Gilligan	Basin Reserve, Wellington	Match drawn
Test 190	14–17 February	Tom Lowry	Harold Gilligan	Eden Park, Auckland	Match drawn
Test 191	21–24 February	Tom Lowry	Harold Gilligan	Eden Park, Auckland	Match drawn

=== England in the West Indies ===
Test Series
No.	Date	Home captain	Away captain	Venue	Result
Test 187	11–16 January	Teddy Hoad	Freddie Calthorpe	Kensington Oval, Bridgetown	Match drawn
Test 189	1–6 February	Nelson Betancourt	Freddie Calthorpe	Queen's Park Oval, Port of Spain	England by 167 runs
Test 192	21–26 February	Maurice Fernandes	Freddie Calthorpe	Bourda, Georgetown	West Indies by 289 runs
Test 193	3–12 April	Karl Nunes	Freddie Calthorpe	Sabina Park, Kingston	Match drawn (by agreement)

== March ==
=== England in Argentina ===
Two-day Series
No.	Date	Home captain	Away captain	Venue	Result
Match 1	18–19 March	Herbert Dorning	Julien Cahn	Belgrano Athletic Club Ground, Buenos Aires	Cahn's XI by 10 wickets
Match 2	22–24 March	Clement Gibson	L Green	Hurlingham Club Ground, Buenos Aires	Match drawn
Match 3	29–31 March	Clement Gibson	L Green	Belgrano Athletic Club Ground, Buenos Aires	Match drawn

== April ==
=== Australia in Ceylon ===
First-class match
No.	Date	Home captain	Away captain	Venue	Result
Match	26–28 December	Churchill Gunasekara	Bill Woodfull	Colombo Cricket Club, Colombo	Match drawn
