= K. M. Cariappa =

Indian Army General and Field Marshal (1899-1993)

Field Marshal K. M. Cariappa
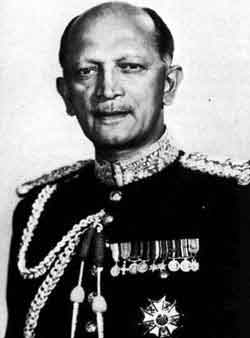

Indian High Commissioner to Australia and New Zealand
- In office 1954–1956
- Preceded by: M.S. Duleepsinghji
- Succeeded by: K. R. P. Singh

4th Chairman of the Chiefs of Staff Committee
- In office 14 October 1951 – 14 January 1953
- President: Rajendra Prasad
- Prime Minister: Jawaharlal Nehru
- Preceded by: Edward Parry
- Succeeded by: Mark Pizey

2nd Commander-in-Chief, Indian Army
- In office 15 January 1949 – 14 January 1953
- President: Rajendra Prasad (from 1950)
- Prime Minister: Jawaharlal Nehru
- Governor-General: C. Rajagopalachari (until 1950)
- Preceded by: F. R. Roy Bucher
- Succeeded by: Rajendrasinhji Jadeja

Personal details
- Born: 28 January 1899 Shanivarsanthe, Coorg Province, British India (now Kodagu district, Karnataka, India)
- Died: 15 May 1993 (aged 94) Bangalore, Karnataka, India
- Military career
- Relatives: K. C. Cariappa (son)
- Allegiance: British India; India
- Branch: British Indian Army; Indian Army
- Service years: 1919–1953, 1986–1993 (Note: Indian military officers of five-star rank hold their rank for life, and are considered to be serving officers until their deaths, like some U.S. officers holding the rank of General of the Army or Fleet Admiral.)
- Rank: Field Marshal
- Nickname: Kipper
- Service number: IA-937
- Unit: Rajput Regiment
- Commands: Western Army; Eastern Army; Bannu Brigade; 17 Rajput (Note: Previously 7th Rajput Machine Gun Battalion.)
- Conflicts: World War II; Indo-Pakistani War of 1947
- Awards: Officer of the Order of the British Empire; Mentioned in Despatches; Chief Commander of the Legion of Merit (United States)

Field Marshal Kodandera Madappa Cariappa (28 January 1899 – 15 May 1993) was an Indian military officer and diplomat who was the Indian Commander-in-Chief (C-in-C) of the Indian Army. He led Indian forces on the Western Front during the Indo-Pakistani War of 1947. He was appointed Commander-in-Chief of the Indian Army in 1949. He is one of only two Indian Army officers to hold the five-star rank of Field Marshal; the other being Field Marshal Sam Manekshaw.

His distinguished military career spanned almost three decades. Born in Madikeri, Kodagu district, Cariappa joined the British Indian Army shortly after the end of World War I, and was commissioned as a temporary first lieutenant into the 2/88 Carnatic Infantry. He was transferred between multiple regiments early in his career before settling on 1/7 Rajputs, which became his permanent regiment.

He was the first Indian military officer to attend the Staff College, Quetta, the first Indian to command a Chief of staff, and was also one of the first two Indians selected to undergo training at the Imperial Defence College in Camberley. He served in various staff capacities at various unit and command headquarters (HQ) and also at the General HQ, New Delhi. Before taking over as the C-in-C of the Indian Army, Cariappa served as the commander of the Indian Army's Eastern and Western Commands.

== Early life and education ==
Cariappa was born on 28 January 1899, in Shanivarsanthe, Coorg Province (present day Kodagu district), Karnataka to a family of farmers belonging to the Kodava clan. His father, Madappa, worked with the revenue department. Cariappa was the second child in a family of four sons and two daughters.

He was known as "Chimma" to his relatives. After completing his education in the Central High School at Madikeri in 1917, he attended Presidency College, Chennai, to pursue his education further. During college, he learned that Indians were being recruited into the Army, and that they were to be trained in India. As he wished to serve as a soldier he applied for the training. Of the 70 applicants, Cariappa was one of 42 who were finally granted admission into the Daly Cadet College, Indore. He scored well in all the aspects of his training and graduated seventh in his class.

== Military career ==
=== Early service ===
Cariappa graduated on 1 December 1919, and was granted a temporary commission. Subsequently, a permanent commission was granted on 9 September 1922, with effect from 17 July 1920. This was done to make Cariappa's rank junior to the officers who passed out (graduated) from Royal Military College, Sandhurst, on 16 July 1920. He was commissioned into the 2nd Battalion of the 88th Carnatic Infantry at Bombay (Mumbai) as a temporary second lieutenant. He was promoted to temporary lieutenant on 1 December 1920. Later he was transferred to the 2/125 Napier Rifles which moved to Mesopotamia (present-day Iraq) in May 1920. He was promoted to lieutenant on 17 July 1921. On his return to India, Cariappa was posted to the 37th (Prince of Wales's Own) Dogras in June 1922. In June 1923, Cariappa was transferred to the 1/7 Rajputs, which became his permanent regimental home.

In 1925, Cariappa went on a world tour to Europe as well as the United States, Japan, and China. He met a large number of soldiers and civilians in various nations. The tour proved to be educational for him. After this he was able to settle down. He was given the nickname "Kipper" by a British officer's wife, who found his name difficult to pronounce, while he was serving in Fatehgarh. In 1927, Cariappa was promoted to captain, but the appointment was not officially gazetted until 1931.

Cariappa was appointed the deputy assistant quarter master general (DAQMG) at HQ Peshawar District in 1931. The experience he had gained at headquarters, his coaching at Royal United Services Institute in 1932, and the courses he attended at Small Arms School (SAS) and the Royal School of Artillery (RSA) helped him to get through the Quetta Staff College's entrance examination. He was the first Indian military officer to attend the course. Though officers were generally given staff appointments after completion of the course, Cariappa was not given his staff appointment until two years later. Until then, he rendered regimental service with his parent unit on the North-West Frontier. In March 1936, he was appointed staff captain of the Deccan Area. In 1938, Cariappa was promoted to major and was appointed the deputy assistant adjutant and quarter master general (DAA & QMG).

=== World War II ===
In 1939, the Skeen Committee was set up to examine the options for the Indianisation of the Indian Army's officer ranks. As Cariappa was one of the most senior Indian officers with about 19 years of service, the committee held several discussions with him. He expressed his displeasure at the treatment of Indian officers in the Army. He stressed the discrimination shown toward Indian officers in terms of appointments, promotions, benefits and allowances to which European officers were entitled but Indian officers were not.

After World War II began, Cariappa was posted as brigade major to the 20th Indian Brigade stationed in Derajat. Later he was appointed the DAQMG of 10th Indian Division which was stationed in Iraq. He earned a Mention in Despatches as DAA and quartermaster general of General (later Field Marshal) William Slim's 10th Division. He served in Iraq, Iran and Syria in 1941–1942 and then in Burma in 1943–1944. Back in India in March 1942, he was posted as second-in-command of the newly raised 7th Rajput Machine Gun Battalion at Fatehgarh. On 15 April 1942, he was promoted to acting lieutenant colonel and was appointed commanding officer of the same battalion, receiving an advancement to temporary lieutenant-colonel on 15 July. With this appointment he became the first Indian to command a battalion (Note: A battalion comprises four rifle companies. A rifle company comprises three platoons. A platoon comprises three sections each of which has 10 men.) in the Indian Army. Cariappa was successful in stabilising the newly raised battalion in terms of administration, training, and the handling of arms. Later the unit was rechristened as the 52nd Rajput and put under 43rd Indian Armoured Division. Within a span of a few months, the unit observed two transformations and two moves. First, the battalion's machine guns were replaced with tanks in order to convert it into an armoured regiment. But soon the battalion was reverted to infantry and re-designated as 17/7 Rajputs. Subsequently, it was moved to Secunderabad. This move led to unrest among the unit's troops which was successfully handled by Cariappa.

On 1 April 1943, he was appointed the assistant quarter master general (AQMG) in the headquarters of Eastern Command. Though Cariappa wished to serve in combat, chance did not favour him. In August 1943, when the South East Asia Command was formed, and the Fourteenth Army was placed under it, Cariappa volunteered for active service in the war. But he was again posted as AQMG of the 26th Indian Division stationed at Buthidaung in Burma. The division played an important role in pushing the Japanese back from Arakan. For his services in the operation, Cariappa was awarded the Order of the British Empire (OBE) in June 1945.

On 1 November 1944, Cariappa was promoted to the acting rank of brigadier, but was not given the command of a brigade as expected. Instead, he became a member of the Reorganisation Committee chaired by Lieutenant General Sir Henry Willcox. Though Cariappa was not happy with the appointment initially, and protested to the Military Secretary, the experience proved to helpful when he took over as the C-in-C four years later. The committee closely worked with the General HQ and Viceroy's Secretariat. This gave the British hierarchy a chance to assess Cariappa.

=== Post-war career ===
On 1 May 1945, Cariappa was promoted to brigadier, becoming the first Indian officer to fully attain the rank. Finally, in November, Cariappa was made the commander of the Bannu Frontier Brigade in Waziristan. It was during this time that Colonel Ayub Khan – later field marshal and President of Pakistan (1962–1969) – served under him. Unlike previous commanders who tried to keep the local tribes under control by force, Cariappa adopted an alternate approach by extending friendly relations to them- which proved a far more effective tactic. When Head of the Interim Government, Jawaharlal Nehru, visited Bannu he found it extremely peaceful and settled, compared to Razmak where another brigade was stationed. Nehru was impressed by Cariappa's way of dealing with the tribes. He was also widely acclaimed for his treatment of the Indian National Army's (INA) prisoners. When Cariappa visited one of the camps that held INA prisoners, he was moved by the conditions in which they lived. He immediately wrote to the Adjutant General recommending that their living conditions be improved and to pardon some of those who were not guilty. These included Colonel Prem Kumar Sahgal, Gurbaksh Singh Dhillon and Shah Nawaz Khan. Cariappa pointed out that these prisoners had considerable support from the Indian leaders, who would later rule the country. This led the British authorities to release most of the prisoners who were detained.

In 1947, Cariappa was the first of two Indians selected to undergo training at the Imperial Defence College at Camberley in the United Kingdom, in order to attend the higher command courses. With the experience he had gained at the Imperial Defence College, Cariappa felt that dividing the Indian Army during the partition would have a devastating effect on both the Indians and Pakistanis. He explained to the hierarchy that without the assistance of British officers, there was a risk of inexperienced Indian officers taking over higher commands. Despite this, his concerns went unaddressed by the hierarchy. During partition, Cariappa handled the division of the Army and sharing of its assets between the two new nations as the officer in charge. On 30 July 1947, Cariappa was promoted to the rank of major-general, becoming one of the first Indians to be promoted to this rank in a combat arm of the Indian Army, along with brigadiers Muhammad Akbar Khan and Maharaj Shri Rajendrasinhji Jadeja.

=== Post-Independence ===
Post-Independence, Cariappa was appointed deputy chief of the general staff. In November 1947, on being promoted to the rank of lieutenant general, he was appointed the Eastern Army commander. In January 1948, owing to the worsening situation in Kashmir, Cariappa was called back to the capital and appointed the GOC-in-C Delhi and East Punjab Command. After taking over the command, he immediately renamed it the Western Command and moved its headquarters (HQ) to Jammu; he subsequently raised a corps HQ under Lt Gen S.M. Shrinagesh at Udhampur. He appointed Lt Gen Kodandera Subayya Thimayya as the GOC Jammu and Kashmir Force (later 19th Division), and Atma Singh as the GOC Jammu Division (later 25th Division).

He launched three subsequent attacks—Operations Kipper, Easy and Bison—to capture the Naushera, Jhangar, Poonch, Zoji La, Dras, and Kargil areas. On 6 July 1948, the Army HQ issued strict instructions against conducting any major operations without its permission. Cariappa protested against this, stating that this policy would threaten Leh, Kargil, and ultimately the Kashmir Valley, which would put the country's security at stake. Though Cariappa asked for two brigades to continue offensive strikes, he was provided only one and permitted to advance to Kargil. He disobeyed orders and launched strikes in the Ladakh area allowing India to assert control over the region. Cariappa continued several operations and offensive strikes against the Pakistanis, which involved high risk. Failure of any of them might have threatened the Indian forces. He was subsequently appointed to the supreme post of commander-in-chief.

=== C-in-C of the Indian Army ===
When Lieutenant General Sir Roy Bucher's appointment as the C-in-C of the Indian Army was about to expire in January 1949, it was decided to replace him with an Indian. Cariappa, Shrinagesh, and Nathu Singh were the contenders for the post. Though Shrinagesh was six months older than Cariappa, he had not served as long as Cariappa had; Nathu Singh had served two-and-a-half years less. But the Interim Government's Defence Minister Baldev Singh was not in favour of Cariappa. He contacted Shrinagesh and Nathu Singh asking for their opinion of being appointed C-in-C. Since both declined the offer, Cariappa took over as the first native Commander-in-Chief of the Indian Army.

The day Cariappa took over the reins of the Indian Army, 15 January 1949, was marked as official Army Day and celebrated annually. As the chief of the Army, Cariappa was instrumental in the formation of the Territorial Army in 1949. Though the National Cadet Corps had been already formed in 1948, it was Cariappa who extended support during its formative years. These two complementary branches of the Army later proved to be very helpful in the wars India fought in later years.

Several measures taken by Cariappa, such as his refusal to induct former Indian National Army personnel into the Army, kept the organisation out of political affairs and maintained its autonomy despite being put under a lot of pressure by Nehru. Nehru only relented when he threatened to resign. However INA's slogan Jai Hind which means "Victory to India", was adopted by Cariappa and later it became a formal phrase between personnel to greet each other. He also turned down the proposal to reserve vacancies in the Army for Scheduled Castes and Scheduled Tribes as had been done in other government services.

After four years of service as the C-in-C, Cariappa retired on 14 January 1953. Before he retired, he made a farewell visit to his parent regiment, the Rajput Regiment, at the Rajput Regimental Centre accompanied by his son and daughter. Rajendrasinhji Jadeja succeeded him as the C-in-C.

== Personal life ==
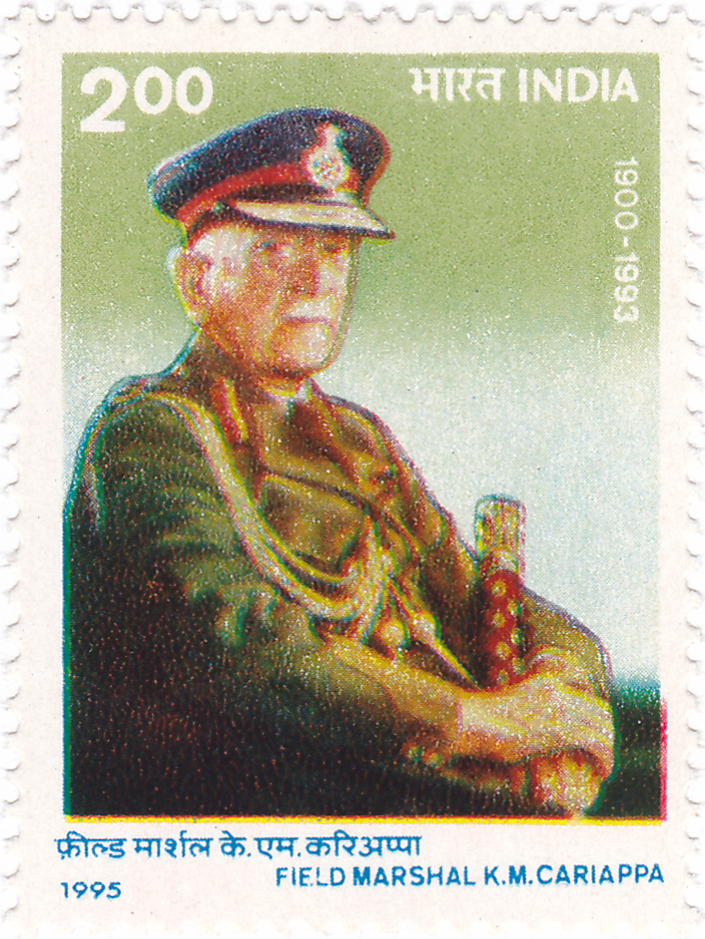
Cariappa on a 1995 stamp of India

Cariappa was married in March 1937, in Secunderabad, to Muthu Machia, a forest officer's daughter. Though their married life was happy initially, later, due to an age gap of almost 17 years, ideological differences, and Cariappa's professional commitments, their marriage broke down. In September 1945, the couple separated without any formal divorce. Three years later, Muthu died in an accident.

Cariappa and Muthu had a son and a daughter. Their son, K.C. Cariappa, was born on 4 January 1938, and daughter Nalini on 23 February 1948. Their son, called "Nanda", joined the Indian Air Force and rose to the rank of Air Marshal.

His sister Bollava's son, Lieutenant general Biddanda Chengappa Nanda also had a distinguished career in the Indian Army and retired as GOC-in-Chief Northern Command.

Cariappa was an ardent devotee of Sathya Sai Baba and regularly visited him to seek blessings. He also followed Sivananda Saraswati.

== Post-retirement and death ==
Cariappa's alliance with the Indian Army was spread over a period of around three decades, during which he had broad experience of staff and command work. After his retirement in 1953, he served as the Indian high commissioner to Australia and New Zealand until 1956. While in Canberra, Cariappa was instrumental in the founding of the Commonwealth Club. With a view toward ex-servicemen's welfare, Cariappa founded the Indian Ex-Servicemen's League (IESL) in 1964. He was also instrumental in setting up the Directorate of Resettlement (later Directorate General Resettlement), an inter-service organisation under the Department of Ex-servicemen Welfare, Ministry of Defence, that looked after the various issues surrounding the resettlement of retired soldiers, especially those who retired young.

Cariappa took part in the re-organisation of the armed forces in many foreign countries. He was awarded the Legion of Merit in the degree of Chief Commander by the American President Harry S. Truman.

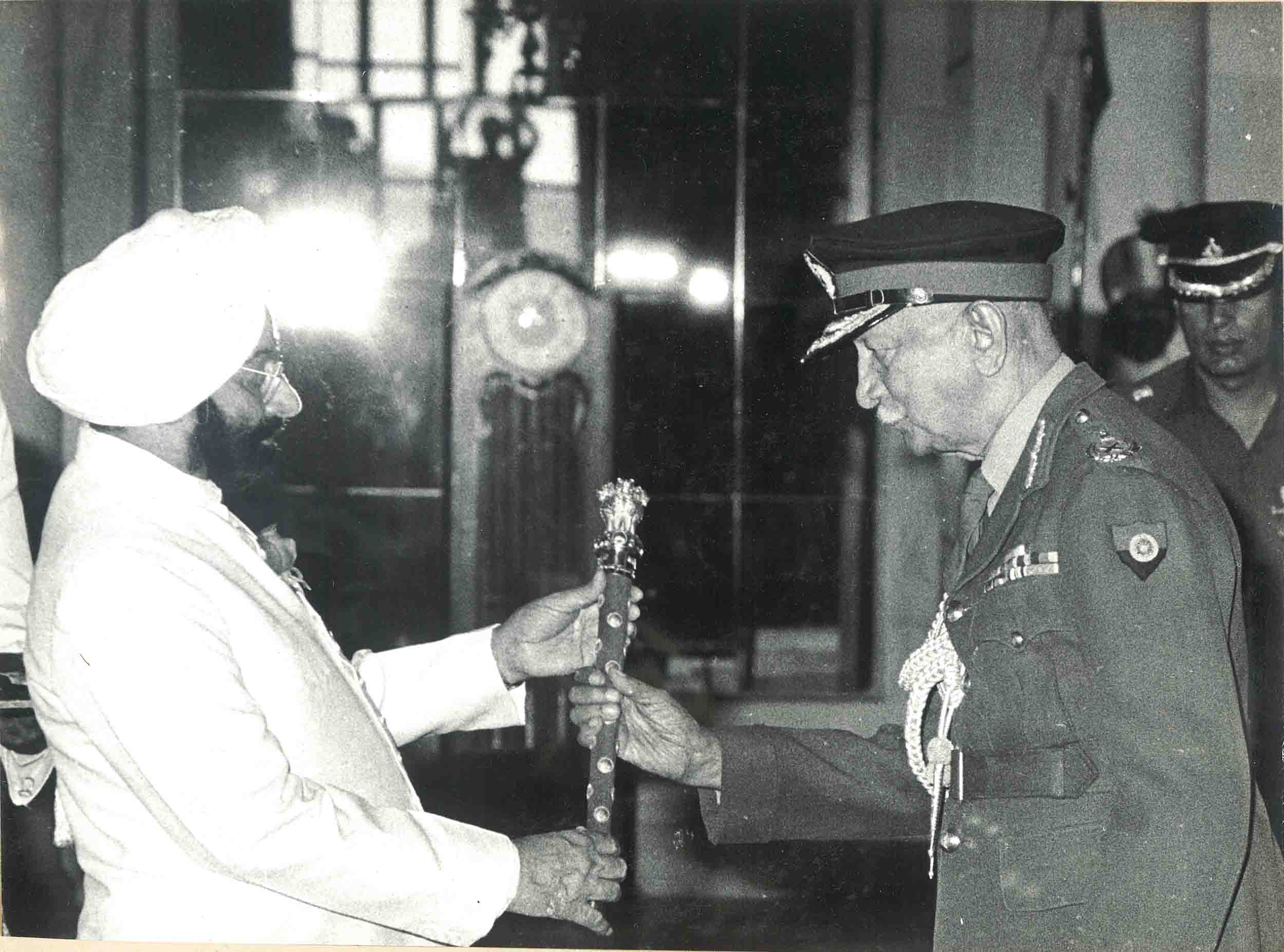
President Giani Zail Singh presenting the Field Marshal's baton to Cariappa

Cariappa also tried his luck in politics after a lot of persuasion from his friends and admirers. He contested 1971 Lok Sabha poll from Mumbai North East (Lok Sabha constituency) but came third. Erroneous claims about him contesting against Krishna Menon appear in some books but they are not supported by any evidence on any Indian govt site.

As a mark of recognition for his commendable service to the nation, the Government of India conferred the rank of field marshal on Cariappa on 15 January 1986, with a special investiture ceremony held at Rashtrapati Bhavan, the official home of the president of India, on 28 April.

Cariappa's health began to deteriorate in 1991; he suffered from arthritis and heart problems. He died in his sleep on 15 May 1993, at the Bangalore Command Hospital where he had been receiving treatment for a few years. His remains were cremated in Madikeri two days later. The cremation was attended by the three service chiefs along with Field Marshal Sam Manekshaw. Cariappa's son, Nanda, lit the pyre while the Honour Guard reversed arms.

== Personality ==
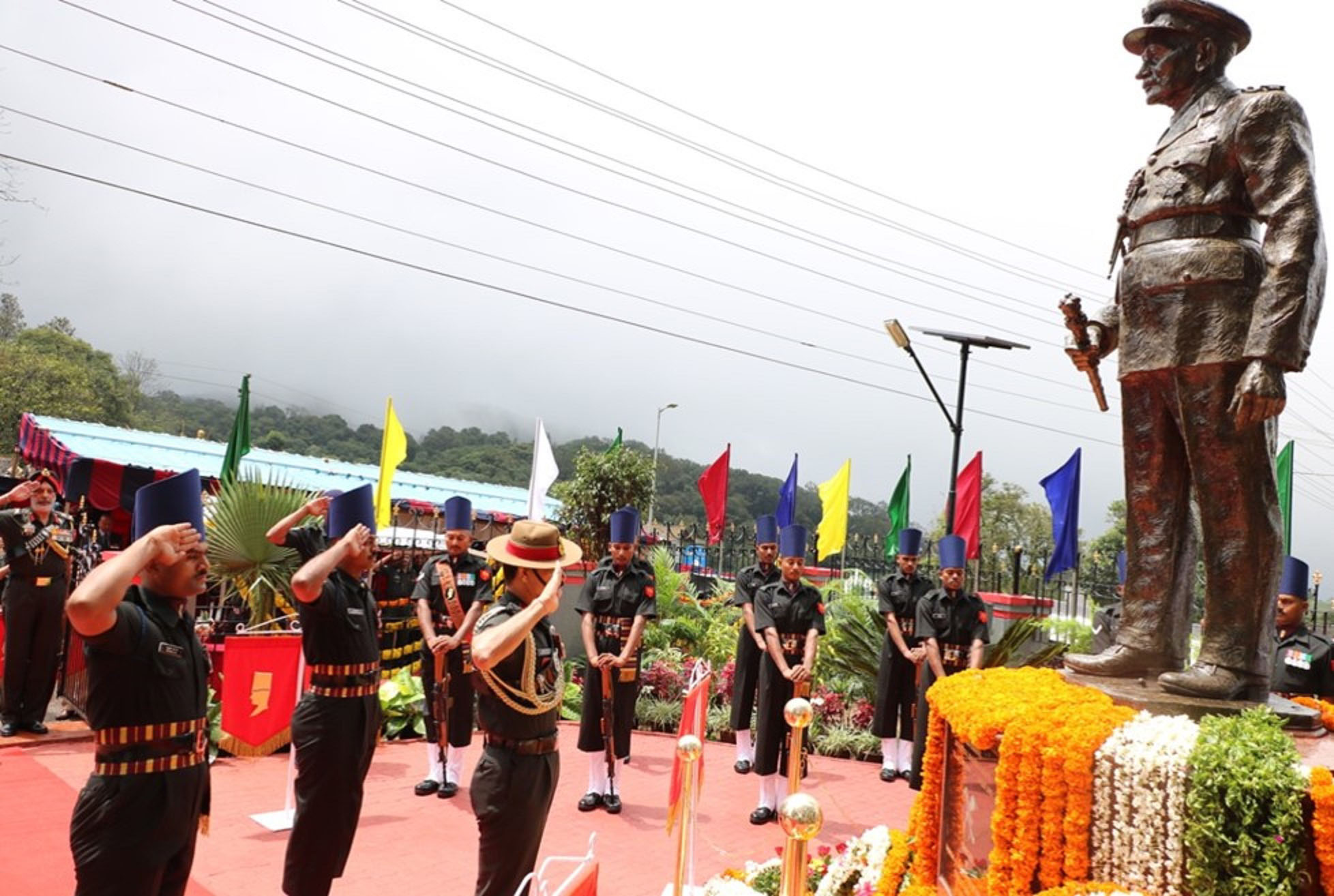
COAS Gen Dalbir Singh Suhag paying tributes at the FM Cariappa Memorial at Madikeri, Coorg

According to biographer Vijay Singh, it was unheard of for Cariappa to use his power and status for personal purposes. One example Singh cites occurred when Cariappa went to the Rajput Regimental Centre to pay farewell before he retired. He brought his son and daughter with him, and both of them stayed at the commandant's house till the next day. According to the rules, children were forbidden to attend the officers' mess. As chief, Cariappa could have taken them to the mess, but he did not.

After he was the C-in-C, he wanted Major (later Lieutenant General) Srinivas Kumar Sinha to be his military assistant (MA). The military secretary noted that a military assistant must hold the rank of lieutenant colonel which required a minimum of six-and-a-half years of service. Sinha was only a major with five years of service. On learning this, Cariappa backed off the idea not wanting to break the rules.

During the 1965 war, his son, Nanda, was shot down over Pakistan. He was captured and held as a prisoner of war (POW). On realizing the identity of the wounded soldier at Kargil, Radio Pakistan immediately announced the capture of the younger Cariappa. General Ayub Khan himself contacted General Cariappa, who was living a retired life at Mercara, his hometown, with information about his son's safety. When Ayub Khan offered to release his son immediately, Cariappa is reported to have scoffed at the idea and told him to give his son no better treatment than any other POW. Singh recounts that Cariappa replied, "He is my son no longer. He is the child of this country, a soldier fighting for his motherland like a true patriot. My many thanks for your kind gesture, but I request you to release all or release none. Give him no special treatment."

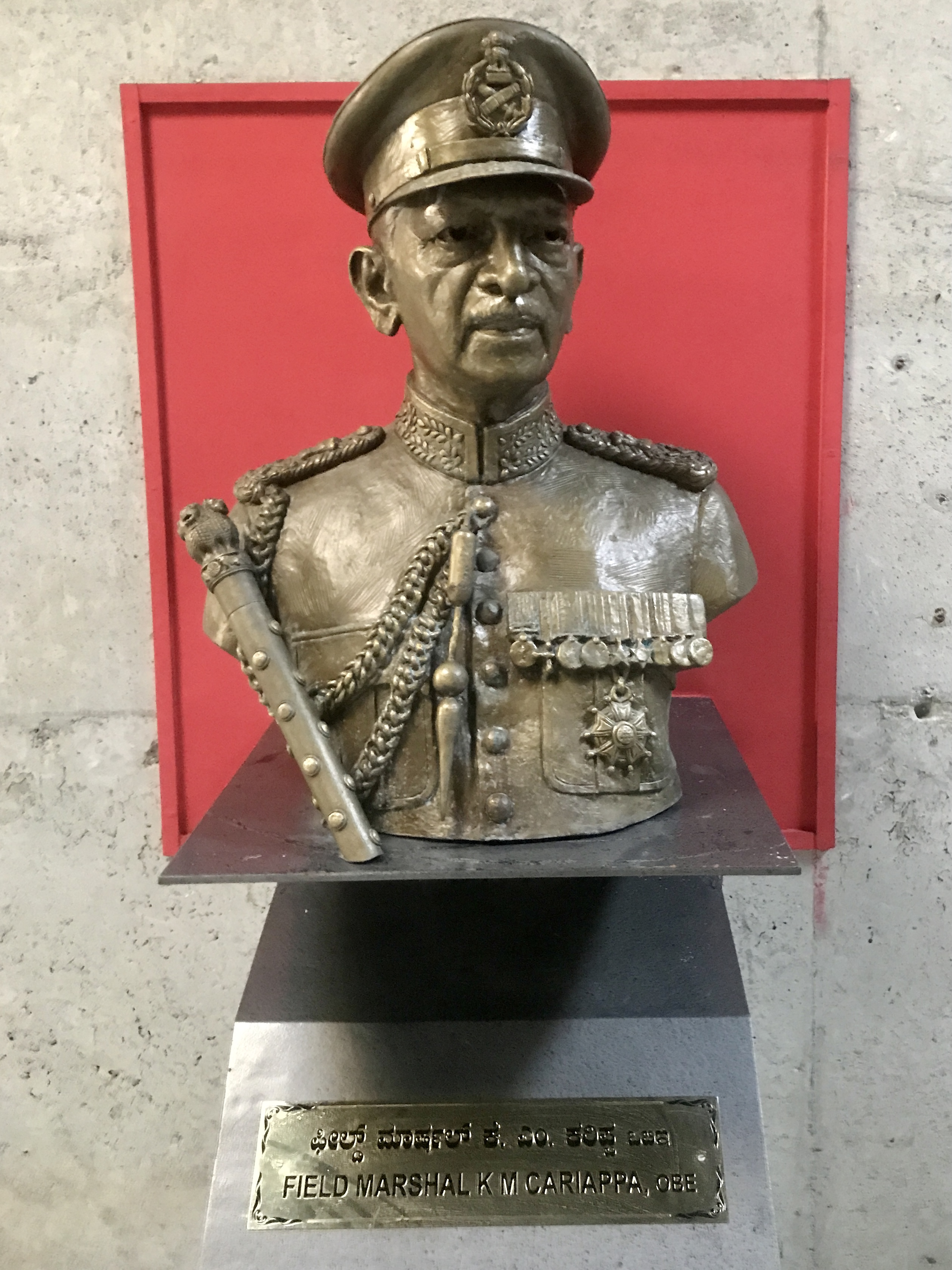
Bust of Cariappa at the National Military Memorial in Bengaluru.

== Awards and decorations ==
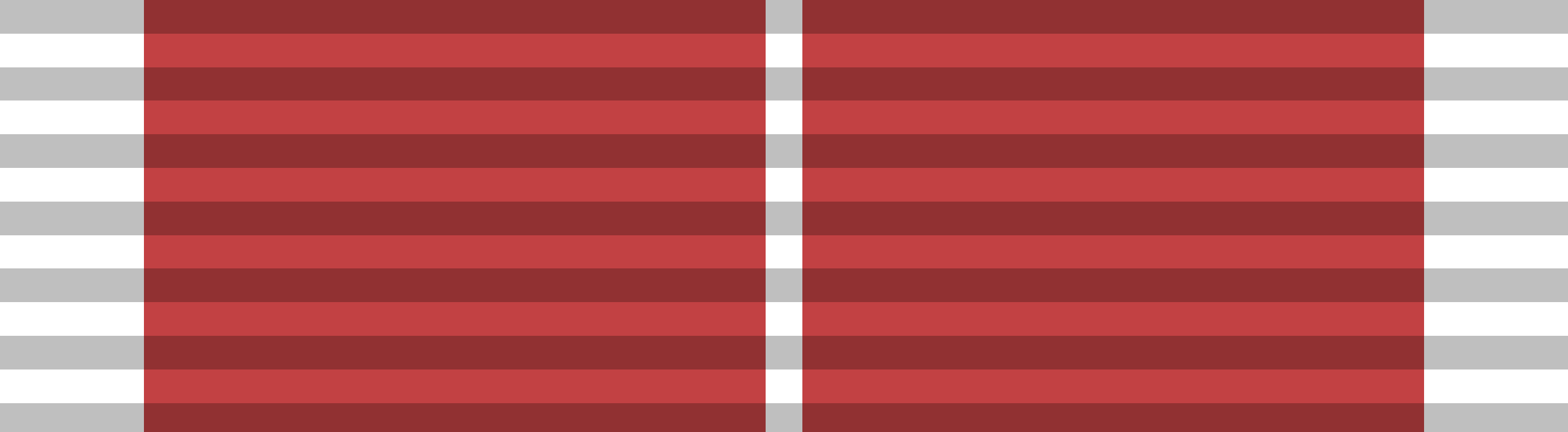
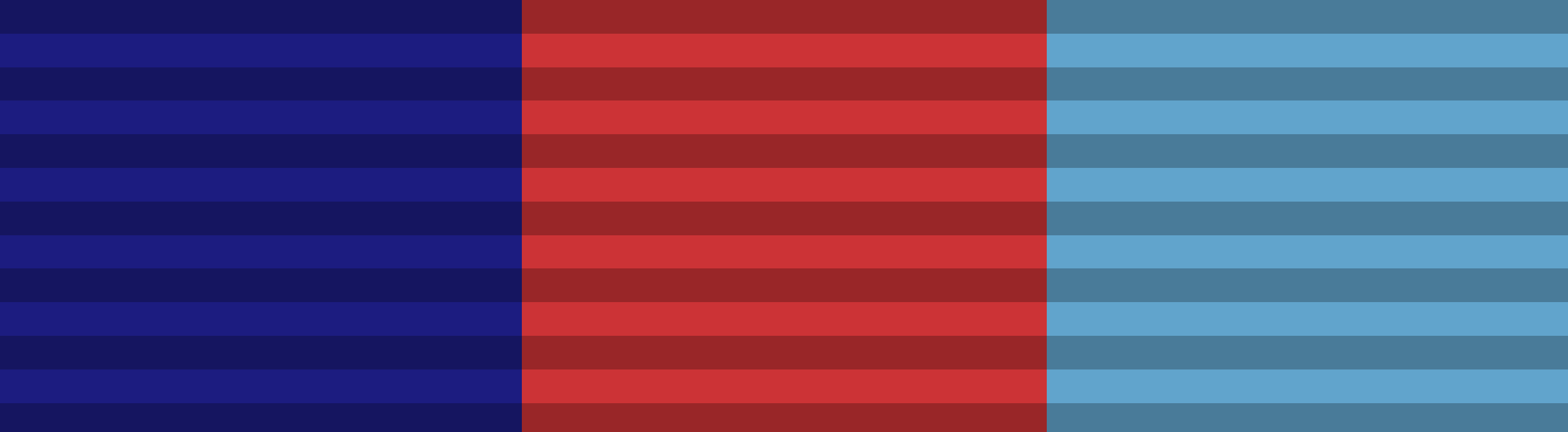

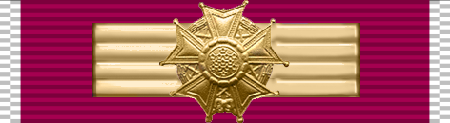

General Service Medal 1947	Indian Independence Medal	Order of the British Empire	1939–1945 Star
Burma Star	War Medal 1939–1945	India Service Medal	Legion of Merit (Chief Commander)

== Dates of rank ==
Insignia	Rank	Component	Date of rank
	Second Lieutenant	British Indian Army	1 December 1919 (temporary); 17 July 1920 (substantive)
	Lieutenant	British Indian Army	1 December 1920 (temporary); 17 July 1921 (substantive)
	Captain	British Indian Army	17 July 1927
	Major	British Indian Army	17 July 1938
	Lieutenant-Colonel	British Indian Army	July 1942 (acting); 15 July 1942 (temporary); 17 July 1946 (substantive)
	Colonel	British Indian Army	1 November 1944 (acting); 1 May 1945 (temporary)
	Brigadier	British Indian Army	1 November 1944 (acting); 1 May 1945 (temporary)
	Major-General	British Indian Army	30 July 1947
	Major-General	Indian Army	15 August 1947 (Note: Upon independence in 1947, India became a Dominion within the British Commonwealth of Nations. As a result, the rank insignia of the British Army, incorporating the Tudor Crown and four-pointed Bath Star ("pip"), was retained, as George VI remained Commander-in-Chief of the Indian Armed Forces. After 26 January 1950, when India became a republic, the President of India became Commander-in-Chief, and the Ashoka Lion replaced the crown, with a five-pointed star being substituted for the "pip.")
	Lieutenant-General	Indian Army	23 November 1947 (acting)
	General (COAS & C-in-C)	Indian Army	15 January 1949 (acting)
	General (COAS & C-in-C)	Indian Army	26 January 1950 (recommissioning and change in insignia)
	Field Marshal	Indian Army	15 January 1986

== See also ==
- Field Marshal Sam Manekshaw
- Marshal of the Indian Air Force Arjan Singh
- Admiral Ram Dass Katari
- Air Marshal Subroto Mukerjee

== Notes ==
Footnotes

Citations

Military offices
Preceded by Arthur Smith	Chief of the General Staff; 1947-1947	Succeeded by P. N. Thapar (officiating)
Preceded by Roy Bucher	General Officer Commanding-in-Chief Eastern Command; 1947–1948	Succeeded by Rajendrasinhji Jadeja
Preceded by Dudley Russell	General Officer Commanding-in-Chief Western Command; 1948–1949	Succeeded by S. M. Shrinagesh
Preceded by Roy Bucher	Chief of Army Staff & Commander-in-Chief, Indian Army; 1949–1953	Succeeded by Rajendrasinhji Jadeja
Preceded by Edward Parry	Chairman Chiefs of Staff Committee; 1949–1953	Succeeded by Mark Pizey
Diplomatic posts
Preceded by M. S. Duleepsinghji	High Commissioner of India to Australia and New Zealand; 1954–1956	Succeeded by K. R. P. Singh
