= Frank Orr (cricketer) =

English cricketer

Personal information
- Full name: Frank William Orr
- Born: 6 March 1879; Marylebone, Middlesex, England
- Died: 18 June 1967 (aged 88); Wandsworth, London, England
- Batting: Right-handed
- Bowling: Leg break

Career statistics
Competition	First-class
Matches	1
Runs scored	30
Batting average	15.00
100s/50s	–/–
Top score	28
Catches/stumpings	–/–
- Source: Cricinfo, 24 August 2019

Frank William Orr (6 March 1879 – 18 June 1967) was an English first-class cricketer.

Orr was born at Marylebone in March 1879. He was educated at Tonbridge School, before studying law at Brasenose College, Oxford. After graduating from Oxford, he became a solicitor. He made a single appearance in first-class cricket for the P. F. Warner's XI against the touring Gentlemen of Philadelphia at The Oval in 1903. Batting twice in the match, he was dismissed for 2 runs by Percy Clark in the P. F. Warner's XI first-innings, while in their second-innings he was dismissed for 28 runs by Bart King. Orr died at Wandsworth in June 1967.
