= Roy Bucher =

British Army general (1895–1980)

General Sir Roy Bucher KBE CB MC
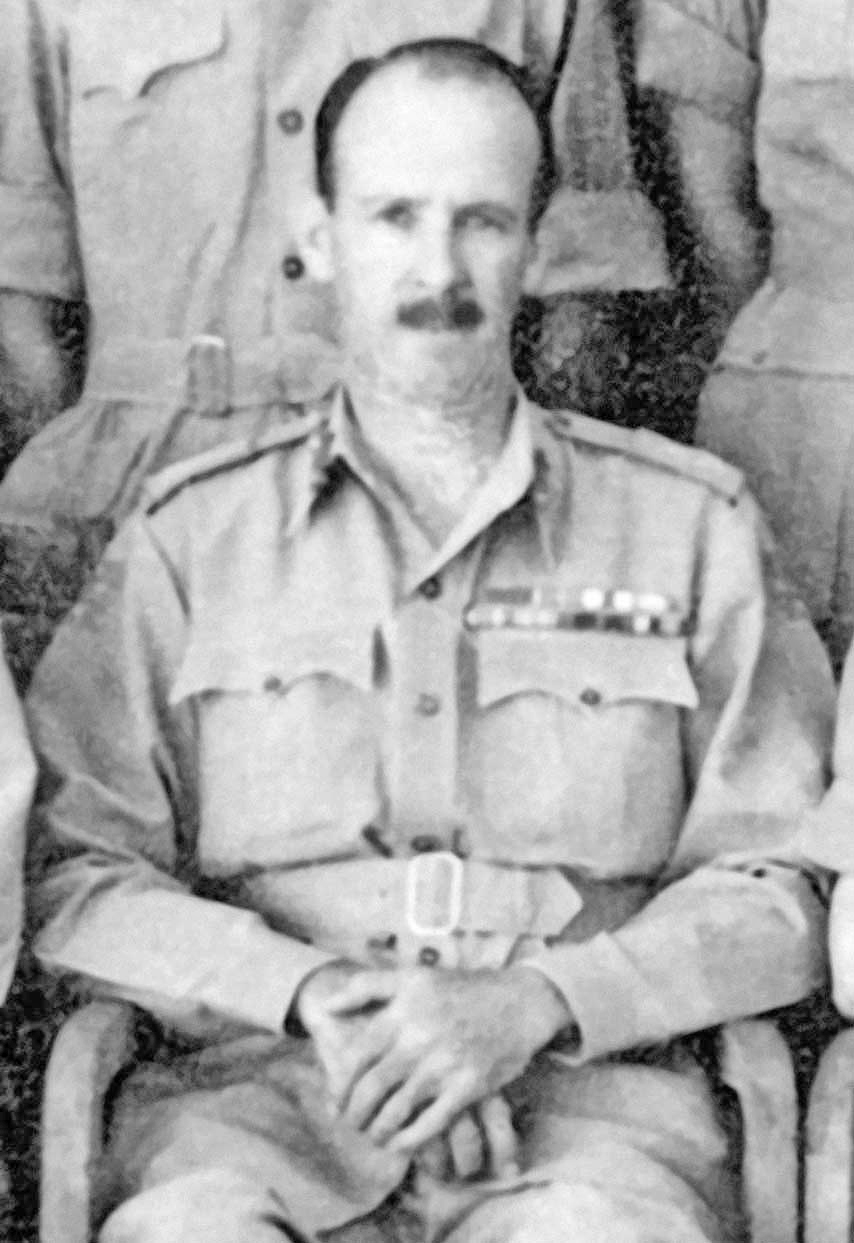
- Born: 31 August 1895; Edinburgh, Scotland
- Died: 5 January 1980 (aged 84)
- Military career
- Allegiance: United Kingdom; British India; India
- Branch: British Army; British Indian Army; Indian Army
- Service years: 1914–1949
- Rank: General
- Service number: 16708
- Commands: Eastern Command; 12th Cavalry; Indian Cavalry Training Centre; Indian Army
- Conflicts: First World War; Third Anglo-Afghan War; Second World War; Indo-Pakistani War of 1947
- Awards: Knight Commander of the Order of the British Empire; Companion of the Order of the Bath; Military Cross

General Sir Francis Robert Roy Bucher KBE CB MC (31 August 1895 – 5 January 1980) was a senior officer of the British Imperial Indian Army who served as the second Commander-in-Chief of the Indian Army from January 1948 to January 1949. He succeeded Sir Rob Lockhart and was the last British officer to hold the position, after which command passed to Field Marshal K. M. Cariappa.

Bucher’s tenure took place during the immediate aftermath of the Partition of India, creating the Dominions of Pakistan and India. This period was marked by the division of the armed forces between the two states and the outbreak of the Indo–Pakistani war of 1947–1948. As Commander-in-Chief, he oversaw the reorganization of the Indian Army and advising the civilian leadership on military operations during the conflict.

Following the transition of the Dominion of India into the Republic of India in 1950, he had already concluded his tenure as Commander-in-Chief and departed from the Indian Republic, marking the end of his association with the country’s military establishment. He returned to the United Kingdom, where he lived a largely private life. Unlike some of his contemporaries, he did not assume prominent public or political roles after retirement.

== Military career ==
Educated at the Edinburgh Academy, and was commissioned from the Royal Military College, Sandhurst as a Second Lieutenant into the Unattached List for the Indian Army, 15 August 1914. He was attached to the 4th Battalion, Cameronians (Scottish Rifles) in the UK from 25 August 1914 to 30 April 1915, when he joined the regiment's 1st Battalion in France. He remained there until 8 November 1915, when he transferred to the 55th Cokes Rifles in India. Confirmed as a second lieutenant in the Indian Army on 5 September 1915, he was promoted to lieutenant on 15 November 1916 (back-dated to 1 September 1915 on 17 August 1917).

He transferred to the 31st Duke of Connaught's Own Lancers in 1916, and was promoted to acting captain on 23 May 1917, again receiving the rank from 16 October 1917, and was promoted to the substantive rank of captain on 15 August 1918.

After the War he served in Afghanistan and Waziristan during the Third Anglo-Afghan War, for which he was awarded the Military Cross (MC) "for distinguished service in the Field in the Afghan War, 1919". He was sent on the course at the Staff College, Camberley in 1926. He was appointed a General Staff Officer 3rd Grade from 7 July 1929 to 15 June 1931 then Deputy Assistant Adjutant General from 16 June 1931 to 6 April 1933 for the Deccan District in India. He was promoted to major on 15 August 1932, and brevetted lieutenant-colonel on 1 July 1937.

Promoted to lieutenant-colonel on 1 November 1939, Bucher served in World War II, initially as Commandant of Sam Browne's Cavalry, then Assistant Commandant, Indian Cavalry Training Centre 1 March 1940 to 31 August 1940 then Commandant Indian Cavalry Training Centre 1 September 1940 to 23 January 1941. He was appointed Assistant Adjutant General at GHQ India from 24 January 1941 to 23 June 1941. He was made Assistant Quartermaster General in Iraq later that year and was put in charge of Administration at Southern Command in India on 21 March 1942, with the acting rank of major-general. He was promoted to colonel on 21 July 1942 (with seniority from 1 July 1940), and advanced to temporary major-general on 21 March 1943. He was appointed a Companion of the Order of the Bath (CB) in the 1945 New Year Honours, and Bucher was promoted to the substantive rank of major-general on 6 April 1945 (with seniority from 5 June 1944).

After the War he was appointed General Officer Commanding Bengal and Assam Area in India. Promoted to acting lieutenant-general on 4 August 1946, he became General Officer Commanding-in-Chief of Eastern Command in India and then, between 1 January 1948 and 15 January 1949, he served as the Commander-in-Chief, Indian Army.

During the Indo-Pakistani war of 1947–1948, the Indian army under his command succeeded in pushing back the Pakistani military and tribesmen and captured most of the contested territory. On 28 November 1948, Bucher had advised Prime Minister Jawaharlal Nehru to agree to a ceasefire because "overall military decision was no longer possible". Bucher in his interview with B.R. Nanda had said that Defence Minister Baldev Singh finally informed him on 31 December to go on with the ceasefire.

Appointed a Knight Commander of the Order of the British Empire, Military Division (KBE) in the 1948 King's Birthday Honours, he retired on 9 October 1949 with the honorary rank of general and was promoted to be major-general on the General List, Regular Army Reserve of Officers, British Army, on 26 September 1950, retaining the honorary rank of general.

== Bibliography ==
- Smart, Nick (2005). Biographical Dictionary of British Generals of the Second World War. Barnsley: Pen and Sword Books. ISBN 1844150496.

Military offices
Preceded by Sir Robert Lockhart	Commander-in-Chief, Indian Army; 1948–1949	Succeeded by KM Cariappa
