= Ran Vijay Singh =

Indian Navy admiral (1932–1971)

Rear Admiral Ran Vijay Singh
- Born: December 1932; Dungarpur, Rajasthan, India
- Died: 3 December 1971 (aged 38–39); Bay of Bengal, Indian Ocean
- Burial place: at sea
- Military career
- Allegiance: India
- Branch: Indian Navy
- Service years: 1953–1971
- Rank: Rear Admiral
- Commands: INS Karanj (S21)

Rear Admiral Ran Vijay Singh Rathore (December 1932 – 3 December 1971) served the Indian Navy from 1953 to 1971. He attended Dartmouth College. He was the son of Lieutenant General Nathu Singh Rathore. He was a descendant of Rao Jaimal Rathore.
