= Himmatsinhji (general) =

Major-General Kumar Shri Himmatsinhji

1st Deputy defence minister of India and 1st Lieutenant-Governor of Himachal Pradesh
- In office 1 March 1952 – 31 December 1954
- Preceded by: Office created
- Succeeded by: Bajrang Bahadur Singh

Personal details
- Born: 1897 British India
- Died: 9 January 1973 (aged 75–76) Republic of India
- Military career
- Allegiance: British India (1917–1947); India (after 1947)
- Branch: British Indian Army
- Service years: 1917–1931, 1939– 1946
- Rank: Major-General
- Conflicts: World War I World War II
- Awards: CIE (1946)

Major-General Kumar Shri Himmatsinhji Jadeja CIE (1897 – 9 January 1973) was the first Deputy defence minister of India and the first Lieutenant-Governor of Himachal Pradesh. A descendant of the rulers of Nawanagar State, he served with the Indian Army, reaching the rank of major-general. He was later a member of the two most recent predecessors of the lower house of the Parliament of India – the Central Legislative Assembly and the Constituent Assembly. He also played several first-class cricket matches and was the nephew of Ranjitsinhji and brother of Duleepsinhji, both of whom played Test cricket for England.

== Early life and family ==
Himmatsinhji was born at Sarodar a village in Nawanagar State on Gujarat's Kathiawar peninsula. Himmatsinhji's brother Duleepsinhji, a Test cricketer for England, and Digvijaysinhji, who succeeded the brothers' uncle, Ranjitsinhji, as ruler of Nawanagar. Rajendrasinhji, was India's first Chief of the Army Staff.

== Sporting career ==
Himmatsinhji
Cricket information
- Batting: Right-handed
- Bowling: Right-arm fast-medium
- Role: Batsman, wicket-keeper

Domestic team information
- Years: Team
- 1933–1937: Rajputana

Career statistics
| Competition | First-class |
|---|---|
| Matches | 5 |
| Runs scored | 92 |
| Batting average | 11.50 |
| 100s/50s | 0/0 |
| Top score | 39 |
| Catches/stumpings | 3/0 |
- Source: CricketArchive, 24 September 2014

A keen sportsman, like many in his family, Himmatsinhji was introduced to cricket during his education in England, where he boarded at Malvern College in Worcestershire. By his last year at the college, 1916, he was considered good enough to open the batting (and occasionally keep wicket) for the school team, with his best score an innings of 84 runs against Cheltenham College. Later in the season, he captained a combined Public Schools team against a team from the Royal Horse Artillery. The match, played at Lord's and umpired by Himmatsinhji's brother, Digvijaysinhji, included six other (future and former) first-class cricketers: for the Public Schools, Lionel Hedges and Nigel Atkinson, and for the Artillery team, Edward Lee, Graham Doggart, Frank Orr, and Peter Remnant. Himmatsinhji remained in England until at least the following year, when he played a charity match for an Indian XI against an Australian XI, for the benefit of war widows and orphans.

Having returned to India, Himmatsinhji played several matches at first-class level during the 1930s. His debut came for a Viceroy's XI against the Roshanara Club in February 1932, where he kept wicket but scored a duck in his only innings. Himmatsinhji's remaining matches came for Rajputana representative sides, predecessors of the current Rajasthan cricket team, including a match against the touring English team during the 1933–34 season and a match against a touring Australian side led by Frank Tarrant during the 1935–36 season. He also twice played at Ranji Trophy level, during the 1936–37 and 1937–38 editions of the tournament. Himmatsinhji's two highest first-class scores, innings of 20 and 39 runs, came during the first of these matches, which Rajputana lost to Central India by 125 runs. He played his last match at first-class level in the following season's tournament, again against Central India, and recorded a pair.

== Military career and later life ==
In World War I, Himmatsinhji received a temporary commission in the British Indian Army and saw service in Mesopotamia. Two of his relatives also served overseas during the war – a cousin, Savaisinhji Devisinhji, was wounded in African campaign, while a brother, Dajirajsinhji, was killed in action in France in 1917. By the end of the war, Himmatsinhji had been promoted to captain. On 26 March 1919, Himmatsinhji received a substantive commission in the British Indian Army as a second lieutenant, with date from 21 September 1918. He was promoted to lieutenant on 21 September 1919, and to captain on 26 March 1924.

His brothers, Pratapsinhji and Digvijaysinhji, with their uncle, Ranjitsinhji, the Jam Sahib of Nawanagar, regularly vacationed together at Ballynahinch Castle, his residence in County Galway, Ireland. In 1930, the three brothers were recalled from the Indian Army to take up roles in the armed forces of Nawanagar, with Himmatsinhji named Commander-in-Chief. As a result, Himmatsinhji relinquished his British commission on 14 June 1931. However, his time in this position was short. Ranjitsinhji died in April 1933, having named Digvijaysinhji as his heir.

After a brief period in the diplomatic service, Himmatsinhji returned to the army, seeing service in the Second World War. A war-substantive lieutenant-colonel at the war's end, he eventually reached the rank of major-general. He was appointed a Companion of the Order of the Indian Empire (CIE) in the 1946 New Year Honours. He was elected to the Central Legislative Assembly, India's pre-independence lower house, in 1946, and was later a member of the Constituent Assembly, the transitional body established after independence. A member of the Indian National Congress, he was a party whip before being appointed Deputy Minister of Defence in Jawaharlal Nehru's first ministry. In this position he chaired a committee responsible for recommended improvements to India's defences along its border with what was then the Kingdom of Tibet, prior to China's invasion and eventually annexation. Upon retirement, Himmatsinhji was appointed the first lieutenant-governor of Himachal Pradesh, a newly created Part C state of India. He served in the position from 1952 to 1954, when he was succeeded by Bajrang Bahadur Singh. Himmatsinhji died at Jamnagar on 9 January 1973.

== See also ==
- Himmatsinghji Committee Report or the North and North East Border Defence Committee

Government offices
| Preceded by Office created | Lieutenant-Governor of Himachal Pradesh; 1952–1954 | Succeeded by Bajrang Bahadur Singh |
