= Ajay Jadeja =

Indian former cricketer (born 1971)

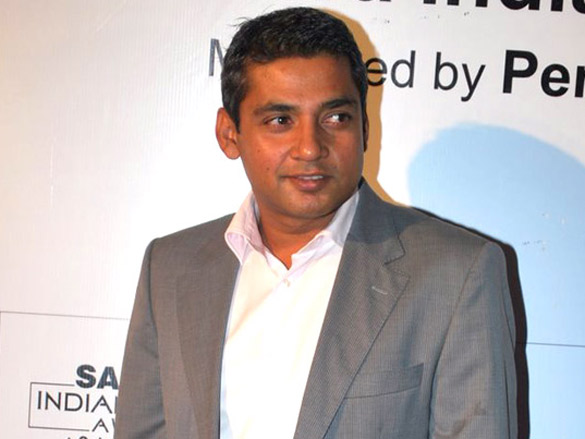
- Jadeja in 2012

Personal information
- Full name: Ajaysinhji Daulatsinhji Jadeja
- Born: 1 February 1971 (age 55); Jamnagar, Gujarat, India
- Height: 5 ft 10 in (1.78 m)
- Batting: Right-handed
- Bowling: Right-arm medium
- Role: All-rounder
- Relatives: Daulatsinhji Jadeja (father); Chatrapalsinhji (uncle)

International information
- National side: India (1992–2000)
- Test debut (cap 196): 13 November 1992 v South Africa
- Last Test: 26 February 2000 v South Africa
- ODI debut (cap 85): 28 February 1992 v Sri Lanka
- Last ODI: 3 June 2000 v Pakistan
- ODI shirt no.: 3

Domestic team information
- Years: Team
- 1988–1999: Haryana
- 2000: Jammu and Kashmir
- 2003–2004: Delhi
- 2005–2007: Rajasthan
- 2013: Haryana

Career statistics
Competition	Test	ODI	FC	LA
Matches	15	196	111	291
Runs scored	576	5,359	8,100	8,304
Batting average	26.18	37.47	54.00	37.91
100s/50s	0/4	6/30	20/40	11/48
Top score	96	119	264	119
Balls bowled	0	1,248	4,703	2,681
Wickets	–	20	54	49
Bowling average	–	54.70	39.62	46.10
5 wickets in innings	–	0	0	0
10 wickets in match	–	0	0	0
Best bowling	–	3/3	4/37	3/3
Catches/stumpings	5/–	59/–	73/–	93/1
Medal record
Men's cricket
Representing India
ACC Asia Cup
Winner	1995 UAE
Runner-up	1997 Sri Lanka
ACC U19 Asia Cup
Winner	1989 Bangladesh
- Source: ESPNcricinfo, 9 January 2018

Ajaysinhji "Ajay" Daulatsinhji Jadeja (born 1 February 1971) is an Indian former professional cricketer and crown prince of the Jamnagar royal family. He was a regular member of the Indian cricket team in the One Day International (ODI) format between 1992 and 2000. He played fifteen Test matches and 196 ODIs for India. He also occasionally captained the India national cricket team, and was popular for his flamboyant style of play and charisma. He was part of the Indian squad which won the 1995 Asia Cup. In 2023, Jadeja worked with the Afghanistan cricket team as the team mentor in their World Cup campaign.

Due to his alleged involvement in match fixing, the Board of Control for Cricket in India (BCCI) life banned him from cricket on 3 June 2000; later the BCCI reduced the ban to five years. On 27 January 2003, a Delhi court lifted the ban and acquitted him. However, Jadeja was not able to play again for Indian cricket team.

After he quit playing cricket, he found work as a coach and commentator. In the 2000s he acted in few Bollywood movies, appeared as contestant in dance reality show Jhalak Dikhhla Jaa and worked as pundit for SET Max, AajTak, NDTV India etc. various times.

== Personal life ==
Ajay Jadeja was born into an erstwhile Nawanagar royal family. which has a cricketing pedigree. His relatives include K. S. Ranjitsinhji, after whom the Ranji Trophy is named, and K. S. Duleepsinhji, for whom the Duleep Trophy is named. Jadeja's father Daulatsinhji Jadeja was a three-time parliamentarian, elected from Jamnagar to the Lok Sabha, the lower house of India's Parliament. His mother is a native of Alappuzha in Kerala. Jadeja married Aditi Jaitly, the daughter of politician and activist Jaya Jaitly, in 2001. The couple have two children, Aiman and Ameera.

Jadeja began his schooling at the Bharatiya Vidya Bhawan, New Delhi, He was subsequently sent to a Rajkumar College in Rajkot. He finally settled down at the Sardar Patel Vidyalaya, New Delhi, from where he completed his schooling. He met Aditi Jaitly here. He later went for higher studies to Hindu College, Delhi.

In October 2024, Jadeja was declared the next Jam Saheb of Nawanagar, (also known as Jamnagar) by the current Jam Saheb of Nawanagar Shatrusalyasinhji Digvijaysinhji Jadeja, making him heir to the Jamnagar royal throne. His current title is Yuvraj Saheb.

== International career ==
Jadeja was a regular in the Indian cricket team between 1992 and 2000, playing 15 Test matches and 196 One Day Internationals. He had a long tenure as vice-captain for the national side and often led his domestic teams. A protege of the great Kapil Dev, Jadeja was known for his stylish batting style, intelligent bowling, and natural athleticism. He benefitted from a very analytical mind while reading pitches and stages of the game, compensating for faults with energetic running between the wickets and a flair that endeared him to fans. He shone in limited overs formats but struggled in Tests.

He was regarded as one of the best fielders in the Indian team in his time and one of the first standout Indian fielders at an international stage, making a memorable debut by diving forward for a catch that would get Allan Border out.

One of his most memorable innings was his cameo in the 1996 Cricket World Cup quarter-final In Bengaluru against arch rivals Pakistan when he scored 45 off 25 balls, including 40 from the final two overs by Waqar Younis. Jadeja, along with Mohammed Azharuddin, holds the record for the highest one-day partnership 4th and 5th wicket, set against Zimbabwe and Sri Lanka respectively. Jadeja was renowned for his remarkable fielding and was considered one of the safest pair of hands in the Indian team during his tenure.

Another memorable occasion of his career was taking 3 wickets for 3 runs in 1 over against England in Sharjah to win the match for India. Jadeja has captained India in 13 One-day matches. One of favourite hunting grounds was the Chinnaswamy Stadium in Bangalore, the venue of the quarter-final against Pakistan in the 1996 World Cup. The last time Jadeja played in a One Day International was against Pakistan in the Pepsi Asia Cup on 3 June 2000. He scored 93 in a game that India eventually lost. Jadeja was the top scorer hitting 8 fours and 4 sixes.

== Match-fixing allegations ==
Jadeja's cricketing achievements were later overshadowed by a 5-year ban for match-fixing. The ban was later removed by the Delhi High Court on 27 January 2003, who acquitted Jadeja, making him eligible to play domestic and international cricket. Jadeja had approached the Delhi High Court on 2 February 2001, challenging the BCCI order imposing the five-year ban on the basis of the K. Madhavan Committee recommendations. The Delhi High Court declared that the investigation had been one-sided, unfairly carried out, and used inadmissible evidence, and cleared Jadeja of any wrongdoing. He was back playing Ranji in 2003.

== After cricket ==
In 2015, Jadeja was appointed as the main coach for Delhi cricket team but he resigned from the post. He worked as a cricket commentator and pundit for SET Max during number of Indian Premier League seasons in the Extra Innings show. He has also worked as cricket expert- analyst for news channels such as NDTV, Aajtak, Cricbuzz and more.

In September 2023, Afghanistan Cricket Board appointed Ajay Jadeja as Afghanistan's assistant coach/mentor for the ICC Men's Cricket World Cup 2023. Afghanistan went on to win four matches in the tournament, including wins against giants like England and Pakistan as well as a shockingly narrow game against the year's winners, Australia, a stark difference from their winless campaign in 2019. Numerous ex-cricketers have suggested that their newfound victories were largely credited to Jadeja's influence and the Afghanistan team and head coach repeatedly expressed gratitude for the impact he had on them. Aided by an increase in funding from the ICC, the team sustained their form by making history at ensuing international tournaments. Months after, ACB CEO Naseeb Khan revealed to the public that Jadeja had refused to take any payment for his mentorship multiple times.

Jadeja also worked as a Batting Coach for MI Emirates in ILT20 2024. He frequently appears on the live commentary in English, Hindi, and Gujarati for Jio Hotstar and Sony LIV. He also starred on the DP World Dressing Room Show for the Champions Trophy in 2025 alongside Wasim Akram and Waqar Younis, among others which was lauded for its quality and analysis, as well as the show of unity between Pakistani and Indian figures in the sporting world.

== Filmography ==
Jadeja acted in the 2003 movie Khel with Sunny Deol and Sunil Shetty. He also acted in the 2009 movie, Pal Pal Dil Ke Ssaat, directed by V.K.Kumar.

Jadeja was a contestant on the celebrity dance show Jhalak Dikhhla Jaa in its first season. He has been appeared on the TV show Comedy Circus, The Great Indian Laughter Challenge as a guest.

He did a cameo in Abhishek Kapoor's film Kai Po Che! acting as himself in a cricket commentator role and starred in many advertisements for multiple brands throughout the 90s and early 2000s.
