= Rajendrasinhji Jadeja =

Indian military officer (1899–1964)

General Maharaj Shri Rajendrasinhji Jadeja DSO
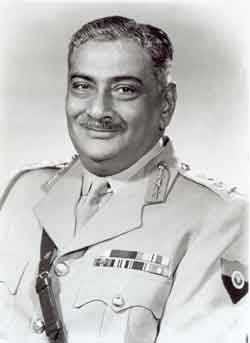

1st Chief of the Army Staff
- In office 1 April 1955 – 14 May 1955
- President: Rajendra Prasad
- Prime Minister: Jawaharlal Nehru
- Preceded by: Office Established
- Succeeded by: General SM Shrinagesh

3rd Commander-in-Chief, Indian Army (later COAS)
- In office 14 January 1953 – 1 April 1955
- Preceded by: Field Marshal K M Cariappa
- Succeeded by: Office Replaced by office of Chief of the Army Staff (India)

Personal details
- Born: 15 June 1899 Sarodar, Kathiawar, Nawanagar State
- Died: 1 January 1964 (aged 64)
- Military career
- Spouse: Maya Kunwarba
- Allegiance: British India; India
- Branch: British Indian Army; Indian Army
- Service years: 1921–1955
- Rank: General
- Service number: IA-35
- Unit: 2nd Lancers
- Commands: Southern Army; Eastern Army; Western Army (then called 'Delhi and East Punjab Command'); 2nd Lancers
- Conflicts: World War II; Indo-Pakistani War of 1947; Operation Polo
- Awards: Distinguished Service Order

General Maharaj Shri Rajendrasinhji Jadeja DSO (15 June 1899 – 1 January 1964), also known as K.S. Rajendrasinhji, was the first Chief of Army Staff of the Indian Army after independence and the second Indian, after Field Marshal K. M. Cariappa.

== Personal life ==
Rajendrasinhji was born on 15 June 1899, at Sarodar in the Kathiawar region of what is now the western Indian state of Gujarat. The family belonged to the ruling Jadeja Rajput dynasty of Nawanagar State (now Jamnagar). K.S. Ranjitsinhji, uncle of K.S.Duleepsinhji, are two other cricketing luminaries produced by that family. He was a cousin of the Maharaja of Nawanagar State and held the royal title of Maharaj (younger brother or close cousin of the Maharaja). In 1928, Rajendrasinh wed Maya Kunwarba. The couple became the parents of three children. His son, Sukhdevsinhji, married the daughter of the ruler of Masuda, Rajkumari Vijaylakshmi Masuda. His youngest daughter was married to the Raja Sahib of the erstwhile princely state of Khairagarh in then Madhya Pradesh (present day Chhattisgarh). She was an MP of the Lok Sabha and a popular leader in her constituency.

== Career ==
Rajendrasinhji attended Rajkumar College, Rajkot, then at Malvern College. Having resolved upon pursuing a military career, he joined the Royal Military College, Sandhurst. In 1921, he was commissioned as a Second lieutenant onto the Unattached List for the Indian Army. He spent a year attached to the 3rd battalion the King's Royal Rifle Corps and then joined the Indian Army and was posted to the 2nd Royal Lancers. As a King's Commissioned Indian Officer, he held various ranks and offices in the British Indian Army and served with distinction during the Second World War.

General Rajendrasinhji became the first Indian to be deputed to serve as Military Attaché to Washington DC in 1945–46.

=== Second World War ===
In 1941, Rajendrasinhji was sent to the Mediterranean and Middle East Theatre as a squadron commander of the 2nd Lancers. In April 1941, his brigade, the 3rd Indian Motor Brigade, was surrounded at Mechili by numerically superior Axis forces. Being encircled, the allied forces were left with no option but to hazard a headlong foray through the enemy forces, into the desert. Rajendrasinhji's squadron took the rearguard position during this operation. While the vanguard suffered much loss of life by a German tank attack, Rajendrasinhji's squadron was not seriously impacted. He led his squadron in a charge through the enemy ranks, and they gained respite in the safety of some nearby hills. The squadron essayed further action on the enemy forces after nightfall and achieved considerable success; indeed, it returned to base with sixty prisoners of war.

For his courageous leadership and determined action, Rajendrasinhji was awarded the Distinguished Service Order (DSO) in 1941. He was the first Indian to be honoured with this decoration during the Second World War.

Returning to India in October 1942, Rajendrasinhji was appointed commandant of 2 Royal Lancers in 1943. In May 1945, he was appointed the army's Deputy Director of Public Relations and posted to Washington, with a further appointment as military attache there from June. He was promoted to brigadier in September 1946 and assigned to command the Piska sub-area. He was then appointed the first Indian director of the Indian Armoured Corps, and shortly before Independence was promoted to acting Major General on 30 July 1947.

=== In India ===
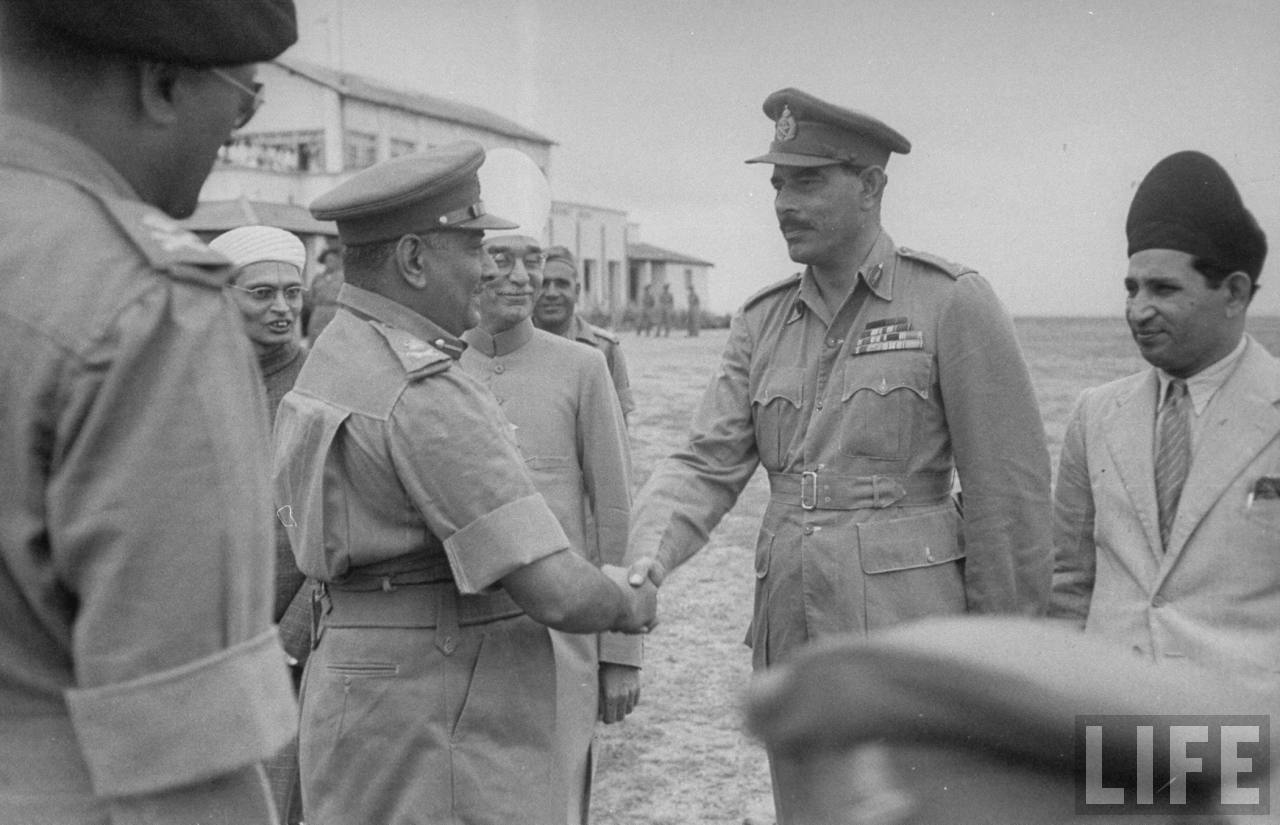
General Rajendrasinhji Jadeja, chief of Indian Army with Gen El Edroos at Hyderabad after Operation Polo

The Partition of India in 1947 caused an upheaval in both the security situation and the dynamics of the Indian army. The partition meant the division of the Indian army, which was concurrently called upon to deal with several critical security situations arising from the partition of the country and the anticipated integration of the princely states. Also during this period, British officers who held most of the senior ranks in the Indian army were gradually disengaged, being replaced with Indian officers. During this critical period, Rajendrasinhji was called upon to shoulder many onerous responsibilities and received rapid promotion in rank commensurately. As a new major-general, he was appointed to command the Delhi sub-area after Independence in August 1947, serving until 1948 as General Officer Commanding (GOC) of the redesignated Delhi and East Punjab Command (1947–48). He was promoted acting Lieutenant General on 18 January 1948 and appointed GOC-in-C Eastern Command. He was then appointed GOC-in-C Southern Command (1948–53), following the retirement of Lt. General E. N. Goddard. Operation Polo, which resulted in the integration of Hyderabad State with India, was executed during his term in office as GOC-in-C (South).

As the senior-most serving officer in the army, Gen. Rajendrasinhji was appointed Commander-in-Chief, Indian Army on 14 January 1953, following the retirement of General (later Field Marshal) K. M. Cariappa. Rajendrasinhji received the rank of General on the same day. With effect from 1 April 1955, the President of India was constitutionally designated the Commander-in-chief of the Indian Armed Forces. Rajendrasinhji then became the first head of the Indian army to be designated Chief of Army Staff. He held that office until his retirement from service on 14 May 1955 and was succeeded by Gen. S.M. Srinagesh.

== Death ==
General Maharaj Shri Rajendrasinhji died on 1 January 1964, aged 64 years.

== Awards and decorations ==

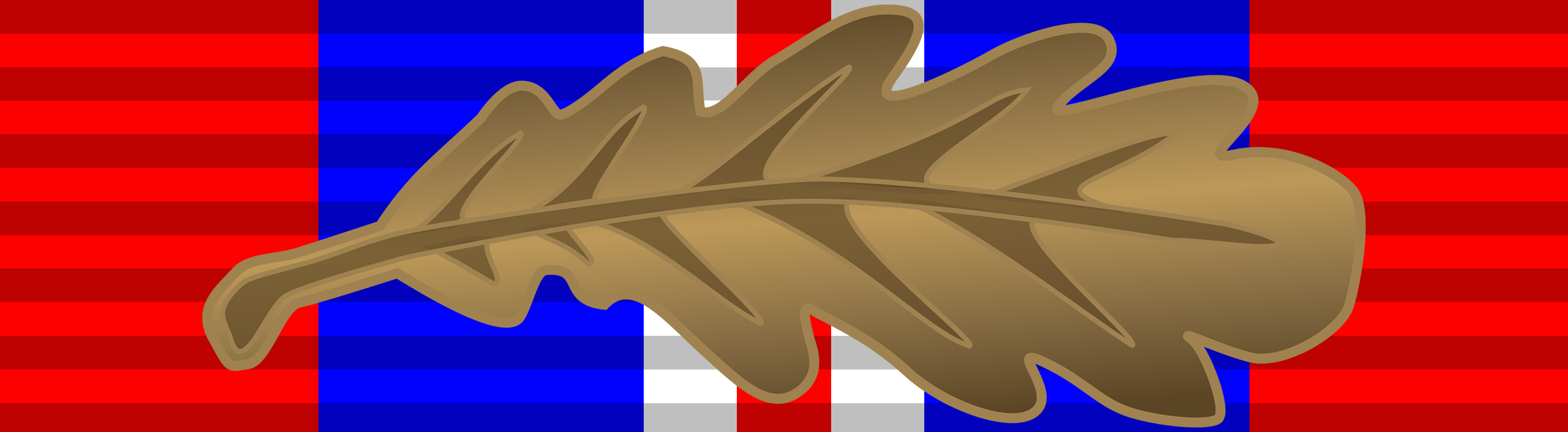

Distinguished Service Order (1941) (First Indian to be awarded in WW2)	India General Service Medal (1936–39)	1939–1945 Star	Africa Star
Burma Star	War Medal 1939–1945 (with oak leaf for MID 1941)	Defence Medal (1945)	Indian Independence Medal (1947)
King George V Silver Jubilee Medal (1935)	King George VI Coronation Medal (1937)	Queen Elizabeth II Coronation Medal (1953)	Legion of Merit (1948) (Degree of an Officer)

=== Others ===
- Order of Yugoslavia Army Class I

== Dates of rank ==
Insignia	Rank	Component	Date of rank
	Second Lieutenant	British Indian Army	14 July 1921
	Lieutenant	British Indian Army	14 October 1923
	Captain	British Indian Army	14 July 1929
	Major	British Indian Army	1 January 1937 (brevet); 1 August 1938 (substantive)
	Lieutenant-Colonel	British Indian Army	29 November 1943 (acting); 29 February 1944 (temporary); 14 July 1947 (substantive)
	Colonel	British Indian Army	11 May 1945 (acting)
	Brigadier	British Indian Army	20 March 1947 (temporary)
	Lieutenant-Colonel	Indian Army	15 August 1947 (Note: Upon independence in 1947, India became a Dominion within the British Commonwealth of Nations. As a result, the rank insignia of the British Army, incorporating the Tudor Crown and four-pointed Bath Star ("pip"), was retained, as George VI remained Commander-in-Chief of the Indian Armed Forces. After 26 January 1950, when India became a republic, the President of India became Commander-in-Chief, and the Ashoka Lion replaced the crown, with a five-pointed star being substituted for the "pip.")
	Major-General	Indian Army	30 July 1947 (acting)
	Lieutenant-General	Indian Army	16 January 1948 (acting)
	Lieutenant-General	Indian Army	26 January 1950 (acting, recommissioning and change in insignia)
	General (C-in-C, IA)	Indian Army	15 January 1953
	General (COAS)	Indian Army	3 May 1955

== Bibliography ==
- Board, Gujarat (2014). HMP Gujarat (PDF). Ahmedabad, Gujarat: ELT Quarterly. ISSN 0975-0258.

Military offices
Preceded by K. M. Cariappa	General Officer Commanding-in-Chief Eastern Command; 1948-1948	Succeeded by Thakur Nathu Singh
Preceded by Eric Goddard	General Officer Commanding-in-Chief Southern Command; 1948-1953	Succeeded by S. M. Shrinagesh
Preceded by K. M. Cariappa	Commander-in-Chief, Indian Army; 1953-1955	Office abolished
New title New Office	Chief of the Army Staff; 1955-1955	Succeeded by S. M. Shrinagesh
