= Shatrusalyasinhji =

Indian cricketer and maharaja

Shatrusalyasinhji Digvijaysinhji Jadeja
- Born: 20 February 1939 (age 87); Jamnagar, Nawanagar State, British India
- Family: Digvijaysinhji Ranjitsinhji (father)
- Cricket career

Personal information
- Full name: H. H. Jam Saheb Shatrusalyasinhji
- Batting: Right-handed
- Bowling: Right-arm off-spin

Domestic team information
- Years: Team
- 1959–1967: Saurashtra
- 1966: Indian Starlets

Career statistics
Competition	First-class
Matches	29
Runs scored	1,061
Batting average	22.57
100s/50s	1/5
Top score	164*
Balls bowled	2,674
Wickets	36
Bowling average	40.05
5 wickets in innings	0
10 wickets in match	0
Best bowling	4/104
Catches/stumpings	15/–
- Source: ESPNcricinfo, 27 March 2014

Shatrusalyasinhji Jadeja (born 20 February 1939) is a former first-class cricketer. He held the title of Maharaja of Nawanagar between 1966 and 1971.

== Family and education ==
His father, H H Jam Saheb Sri Digvijaysinhji Ranjitsinhji, played one first-class match, captaining Western India against MCC in 1933–34, just after succeeding Ranjitsinhji to the title of Maharaja of Nawanagar. Shatrusalyasinhji is also the nephew of Duleepsinhji.

Shatrusalyasinhji was educated at Malvern College in England, where he played for the First XI in 1957 and 1958. In 1957 he took 42 wickets at 15.11 and made 166 runs at 23.71, and in its schools report for the season Wisden (referring to him as "M.K.S. Shatrushalyasinhji") noted his "ability to bowl off-breaks at an unusually speedy pace". In 1958 he was "not as effective as in the previous year", taking 22 wickets at 18.22.

== Cricket career ==
Shatrusalyasinhji made his first-class debut in the 1958–59 season, playing for Saurashtra against Bombay, scoring 15 not out and a duck and taking the wicket of Arvind Apte. In 1959 he and his father visited England and he played three matches for Sussex Second XI as an amateur, without much success.

He played three matches for Saurashtra in 1959–60, four in 1961–62, and four in 1962–63, with a highest score of 65, the top score of the match, in a victory over Baroda in 1961–62. His highest career score came against Maharashtra in 1963–64, when batting at number three he scored 164 not out in seven and a half hours out of a total of 382.

In 1964, he brought his old Sussex teammates Les Lenham and Tony Buss to India; Lenham to coach him, Buss to bowl to him. Lenham said Shatrusalyasinhji "wanted to be a Ranji and a Duleep, all rolled into one, but he played too exotically". His batting yielded only 113 runs in four matches in 1964–65, but he did take his best bowling figures, 4 for 101 against Baroda, in a Saurashtra team that also included two other members of the Jamnagar royal family, Kumar Indrajitsinhji and Chatrapalsinhji.

In 1966–67, Shatrusalyasinhji's final season of first-class cricket, he captained Saurashtra in the Ranji Trophy, and Indian Starlets to the final of the Moin-ud-Dowlah Gold Cup Tournament, and was also selected for West Zone to play the touring West Indians. In seven first-class matches that season, he scored 257 runs at an average of 21.41.

== After cricket ==
Shatrusalyasinhji was head of the Saurashtra Cricket Association till 1972.

At one stage he kept around 8000 pets in his palaces. He has a 45-acre (18 ha) walled wildlife reserve opposite his house in Jamnagar.

During a three-day tour of Gujarat in April 2022, the Indian Prime Minister Narendra Modi visited Shatrusalyasinhji at his home. He spoke of their friendship and paid tribute to the goodwill Shatrusalyasinhji and his family had fostered around the world.

== Personal life ==
Shatrusalyasinhji married a member of the Nepalese royal family, and succeeded to the title of Maharaja Jam Saheb of Nawanagar in February 1966 on the death of his father. When the Twenty-sixth Amendment to the Constitution of India was passed in 1971, abolishing princely privy purses and entitlements, he became H H Jam Saheb Sri Shatrusalyasinhji.
