= Duleepsinhji =

Indian cricketer

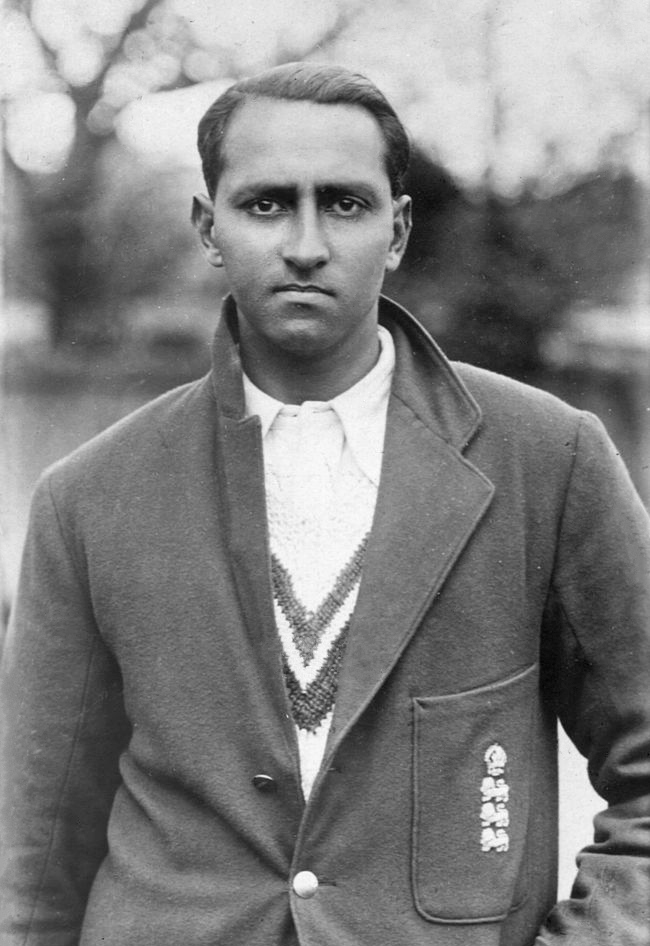

Personal information
- Full name: Kumar Shri Duleepsinhji
- Born: 13 June 1905; Nawanagar State, (present day Jamnagar), Kathiawar Agency, British India
- Died: 5 December 1959 (aged 54); Bombay, Bombay State, India
- Nickname: Mr. Smith
- Batting: Right-handed
- Bowling: Right-arm leg break

International information
- National side: England
- Test debut (cap 238): 15 June 1929 v South Africa
- Last Test: 18 August 1931 v New Zealand

Domestic team information
- Years: Team
- 1921–1923: Cheltenham Cricket Club
- 1925–1928: Cambridge University
- 1926–1932: Sussex
- 1928–1929: Hindus

Career statistics
| Competition | Test | First-class |
|---|---|---|
| Matches | 12 | 205 |
| Runs scored | 995 | 15,485 |
| Batting average | 58.52 | 49.96 |
| 100s/50s | 3/5 | 50/64 |
| Top score | 173 | 333 |
| Balls bowled | 6 | 1,835 |
| Wickets | 0 | 28 |
| Bowling average | – | 48.03 |
| 5 wickets in innings | – | 0 |
| 10 wickets in match | – | 0 |
| Best bowling | – | 4/49 |
| Catches/stumpings | 10/– | 256/– |
- Source: ESPNcricinfo, 1 October 2009

Kumar Shri Duleepsinhji (Note: Duleepsinhji's name includes the Gujarati suffix -sinhji, composed of two separate elements: -sinh, a cognate of Singh (a name common amongst the Rajputs of Gujarat ), and -ji, a general honorific. His name is less commonly given as Duleepsinhji. During his playing career, Duleepsinhji was often recorded on scorecards as Duleep or K. S. Duleepsinhji. The latter usage derives from the honorifics Kumar Shri, which were not his given names, but part of his title. The use of initials derived from the tradition of distinguishing amateur players from professionals – amateurs had their initials listed on scorecards, whereas professionals were denoted by only their surnames.) (13 June 1905 – 5 December 1959), often known as Duleep or K. S. Duleepsinhji, was an Indian international cricketer who represented the English cricket team. He was a right handed batsman and an occasional leg break bowler. Playing in the era before the Indian Independence and the establishment of the Indian cricket team, he played first class cricket in the United Kingdom and later represented the England team.

Descended from the royal family of Nawanagar, (present day Jamnagar), Duleepsinhji was born on the Kathiawar peninsula in present-day Gujarat. He was educated in Rajkot, before moving to England where he attended Cheltenham College and Cambridge University. He represented Sussex in the English county championship, whom he captained later. He was one of the most prolific scorers in first class cricket with more than 15,000 runs including 50 centuries at an average just below 50. He was a slip fielder and took 256 catches. Though he had a short test career, he scored 995 runs at an average of 58.52 and has one of the highest averages in the history of test cricket.

Post his cricketing career, Duleepsinhji served as the High Commissioner of India in Australia and New Zealand and later as the chairman of the Public Service Commission in Saurashtra. The Duleep Trophy, one of the premier first class cricket competitions in India is named after him.

== Early and personal life ==
Duleepsinhji was born on 13 June 1905 in Nawanagar, (present day Jamnagar), Kathiawar, British India (present day Gujarat, India). He was from the royal family of Nawanagar state and his siblings included Himmatsinhji, the first Lieutenant-Governor of Himachal Pradesh and Digvijaysinhji, who became the ruler of Nawanagar. Ranjitsinhji, after whom the Indian premier first class cricket competition Ranji Trophy is named, was his uncle. He was educated at the Rajkumar College, Rajkot, before moving to England where he attended Cheltenham College and Cambridge University.

== Cricket career ==
=== Early years ===
Duleepsinhji represented Cheltenham Cricket Club from 1921 to 1923 and captained the side later. He had a batting average of 52.36 with his highest score being 162 and took 50 wickets at an average of 13.66 runs with his leg breaks. In 1925, he moved to study in Cambridge University and represented the Cambridge University Cricket Club till 1928. In 1927, he scored his highest score of 254 against Middlesex which was the highest for Cambridge.

=== County career ===
Duleepsinhji made his first class debut for Sussex in 1926. He did not play the 1927 English cricket season due to suffering from a pulmonary disease and recuperated in Switzerland.

In natural gifts of eye, wrist and footwork he is certainly far above the ordinary measure... there is no doubt about the judgment and certainty with which he takes toll of straight balls of anything but the most immaculate length. His late cutting is quite beautiful and there is a certain ease and maturity about all his batting methods that stamps him as of a different class from the ordinary school batsman.

— Harry Altham, former president of Marylebone Cricket Club

He returned to play for Sussex in 1928 and scored more than 2500 runs in each of the next three seasons. In the 1930 English cricket season, he made his top score of 333 runs on a single day against Northamptonshire which is the highest score by a Sussex batter till date. He scored centuries in each of the two innings three times in his career.

In 1931, he was appointed the captain of Sussex and had his most prolific year scoring 12 centuries with four of them in successive innings. He retired from first class cricket in 1932 due to illness. He was one of the most prolific scorers in first class cricket with more than 15,485 runs including 50 centuries at an average of 49.95 with 9,178 runs including 35 centuries at an average of 51.56 for Sussex. He headed the batting average charts in the County championship in every season from 1926 to 1932. He was a prolific slip fielder and took 256 catches.

=== Test career ===
Of singular charm of character; extremely modest of his own wonderful ability; and with a love for the game which transcended his joy in all other pastimes, Duleepsinhji will always be remembered as one of the outstanding personalities during his period in first-class cricket.

— Wisden Cricketers' Almanack

He made his test debut for England against the visiting South African team in June 1929. His only tour abroad was with the Marylebone Cricket Club team in Australia and New Zealand in 1929-30, when he was the top scorer. In June 1930, he made his highest score of 173 in his first match against the Australian team at Lord's. Harold Gilligan, the captain rated him the best player of slow bowling on a wet pitch that he ever saw.

Duleep had to withdraw from the MCC team for the bodyline tour of Australia in 1932. He made 12 appearances in tests and scored 995 runs at an average of 58.52 and has one of the highest averages in the history of test cricket.

== Public service ==
Following his playing career, he served as the High Commissioner of India in Australia and New Zealand and later as the chairman of the Public Service Commission of Saurashtra after his return to India.

== Death ==
Duleepsinhji died on 5 December 1959, following a heart attack, in Bombay.

== Awards and honours ==
- Wisden Cricketer of the Year (1930)

== Legacy ==
The Duleep Trophy, one of the premier first class cricket competitions in India is named after him.

== Notes ==
Sporting positions
| Preceded by Harold Gilligan | Captain, Sussex county cricket team 1931–1932 | Succeeded by R. S. G. Scott |
