= Nawanagar State =

Former princely state in Gujarat, India (1540–1947)

Coordinates: 22.47°N 70.07°E

Kingdom of Nawanagar State of the Kingdom of Nawangar Kingdom State of Nawangar
- 1540–1947
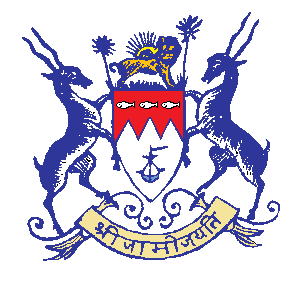
- Coat of arms

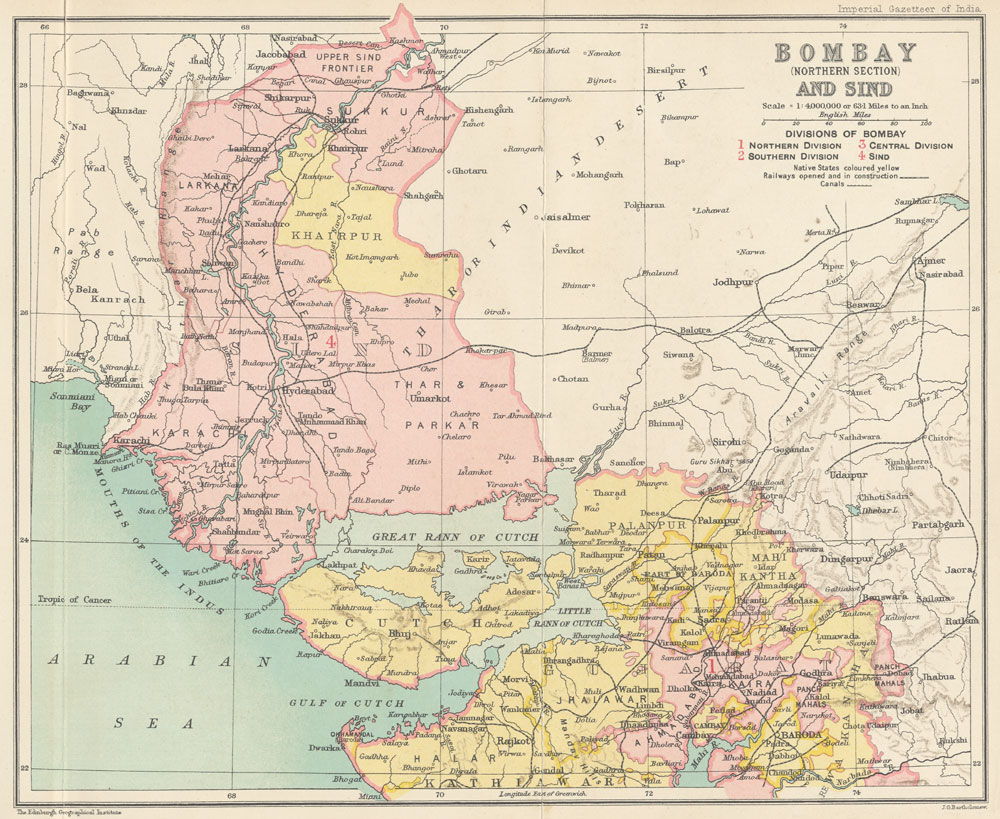
- Navanagar, part of Bombay Presidency, 1909
- Capital: Jamnagar
- Official languages: Gujarati
- Religion: Hinduism (Official); Islam; Jainism; Christianity
- Government: Monarchy

Establishment
- History
  - Battle of Mitoli: 1540
  - Established: 1540
  - Independence of India: 1947

Area
  - Total: 9,820 km^{2} (3,790 sq mi)
Succeeded by
India

Nawanagar was an Indian Petty kingdom in the historical Halar region, located on the southern shores of the Gulf of Kutch. It was ruled by the Jadeja Rajput dynasty and became a part of newly formed India. Its capital city was Jamnagar. It had an area of 3,791 square miles (9,820 km^{2}) and a population estimated at 336,779 in 1901. Its rulers, who used the honorific of "Jam Saheb" are of the same clan as the Rao of Kutch. They were entitled to a 13-gun salute. The state flag was a rectangular red flag with a white elephant, near and facing the hoist. During the British, the state was part of the Kathiawar Agency, within the Gujarat Division of Bombay Presidency.

The state had a pearl fishery and much of its wealth came from this. Nawanagar is also famous for its late ruler Jam Saheb Ranjitsinhji (died 1933), who was a famous cricket player at Cambridge in England and represented England in Test cricket, before his accession to the throne.

== History ==
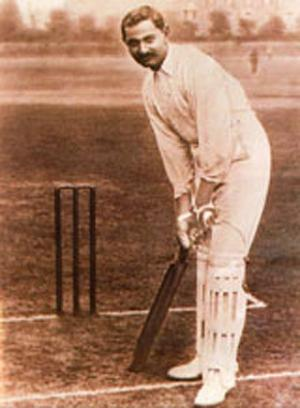
Picture of Ranjitsinhji, celebrated cricketer and Maharaja of Nawanagar.

Nawanagar was founded in 1540 by Jam Sri Rawalji, a descendant of the Jadeja ruler of Kutch, and was thereafter in an almost constant state of war with its neighbours and with the Mughal Empire. Two such major wars were the Battle of Mithoi and Battle of Bhuchar Mori fought in 1591. During the Reign of Shah Jahan, the ruler of Nawanagar paid tribute and maintained obedience to the Mughal government. The "Walker Treaty of 1807" brought peace to the Kathiawar states for the first time in several generations. Nawanagar came under British protection on 22 February 1812.

K. S. Ranjitsinhji was one of the world's greatest cricket players and, later, became Jam Saheb in 1907 until 1933. The inclusive circle of eight players promoted excellence in cricket, both in the county and domestic games. After his death, Ranji Trophy, a domestic first-class cricket championship played in India between different city and state sides, was started in 1934 by Board of Control for Cricket in India (BCCI).

Jam Saheb Shri Sir Ranjitsinhji remained the chancellor of the Chamber of Princes (1931–1933). After his death, in 1933, he was succeeded by his nephew Jam Saheb Shri Sir Digvijaysinhji, who became its chancellor (1937–1944) and continued to promote the octet circle in excellence in cricket, academics and welfare. In 1942 the Maharaja set up a refugee camp for Polish children in Balachadi.

Nawanagar was one of the first kingdoms to sign the Instrument of Accession in 1948 after Indian independence. Afterwards, the late ruler, Digvijaysinhji, served as the first Rajpramukh of Kathiawad, then represented his country at the United Nations.

In 1949, the princely states of Nawanagar and Dhrol, Jalia Dewani in Kathiawar merged into the new state of Saurashtra. On 19 June 1959, the boundaries of the district were enlarged by the inclusion of the adjoining Okha mandal, and the district was renamed Jamnagar. This district became part of the new state of Gujarat on the division of the State of Bombay on 1 May 1960.

Bhanji Dal Jadeja commanded Jam Sataji's force during the Mughal attack on Junagadh State and defeated the attack.

== Rulers (Jam Saheb) ==
Regime	Rulers	Born	Died
1540 – 1562	Rawalji Lakhaji	1480	1562
1562 – 1569	Vibhaji Rawalji		1569
1569 – 1608	Sataji Vibhaji		1608
1608 – 1624	Jasaji Sataji		1624
1624 – 1645	Lakhaji Ajaji		1645
1645 – 1661	Ranmalji Lakhaji		1661
1661 – 1664	Raisinhji Lakhaji		
1664 – 1673	Interregnum		
1673 – 1690	Tamachi Rainsinhji		
2 October 1690 – 13 October 1708	Lakhaji Tamachi		1708
13 October 1708 – 13 August 1711	Raisinhji Lakhaji		1711
13 August 1711 – 1743	Tamachi Raisinhji		1743
September 1743 - 2 November 1767	Lakhaji Tamachi	1743	1767
2 November 1767 – 6 August 1814	Jasaji Lakhaji		1814
6 August 1814 – 24 February 1820	Sataji II Lakhaji		1820
24 February 1820 – 22 February 1852	Ranmalji Sataji II		1852
22 February 1852 – 28 April 1895	HH Maharaja Jam Shri Vibhaji II Ranmalji	1827	1895
28 April 1895 – 14 August 1906	HH Maharaja Jam Shri Jashwantsinhji Vibhaji II	1882	1906
12 March 1907 – 2 April 1933	HH Maharaja Jam Shri Ranjitsinhji Vibhaji II	1872	1933
2 April 1933 – 15 August 1947	HH Maharaja Jam Shri Digvijaysinhji Ranjitsinhji	1895	1966
3 February 1966 - 12 October 2024	HH Maharaja Jam Shri. Shatrusalyasinhji Digvijaysinhji	1939	
12 October 2024 - Present	HH Maharaja Jam Shri. Ajaysinhji Daulatsinhji Jadeja	1971	

== Jewellery collection ==
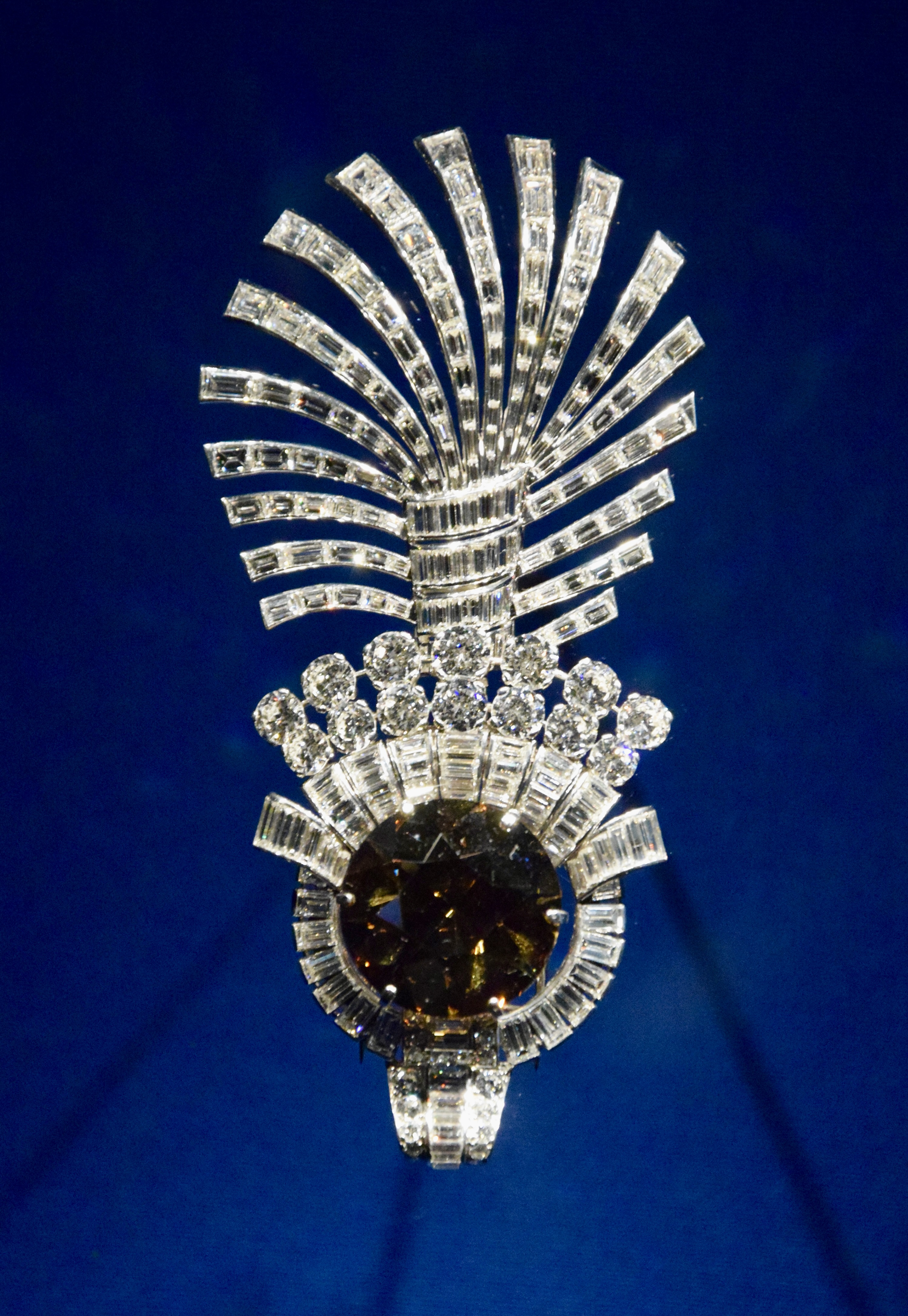
The Eye of the Tiger.

The Maharaja Jamsaheb of Nawanagar were also known for their jewellery collection; especially Ranjithsinhji, whose Emerald collection according to Jacques Cartier was "unequaled in the world, if not in quantity, then certainly in quality". The collection included an emerald and pearl necklace, an art deco emerald and diamond necklace designed by Jacques Cartier and an Emerald collar or choker also designed by Jacques Cartier.

The 61.5 carat (12.3 g) whisky-coloured diamond, "The Eye of the Tiger", was mounted by Cartier in a turban aigrette for the JMaharaja or Maharaja of Nawanagar in 1934.

== See also ==
- Nawanagar cricket team
- Political integration of India
- Western India States Agency
- Jam Sahib
- Jamnagar & Dwarka Railway
