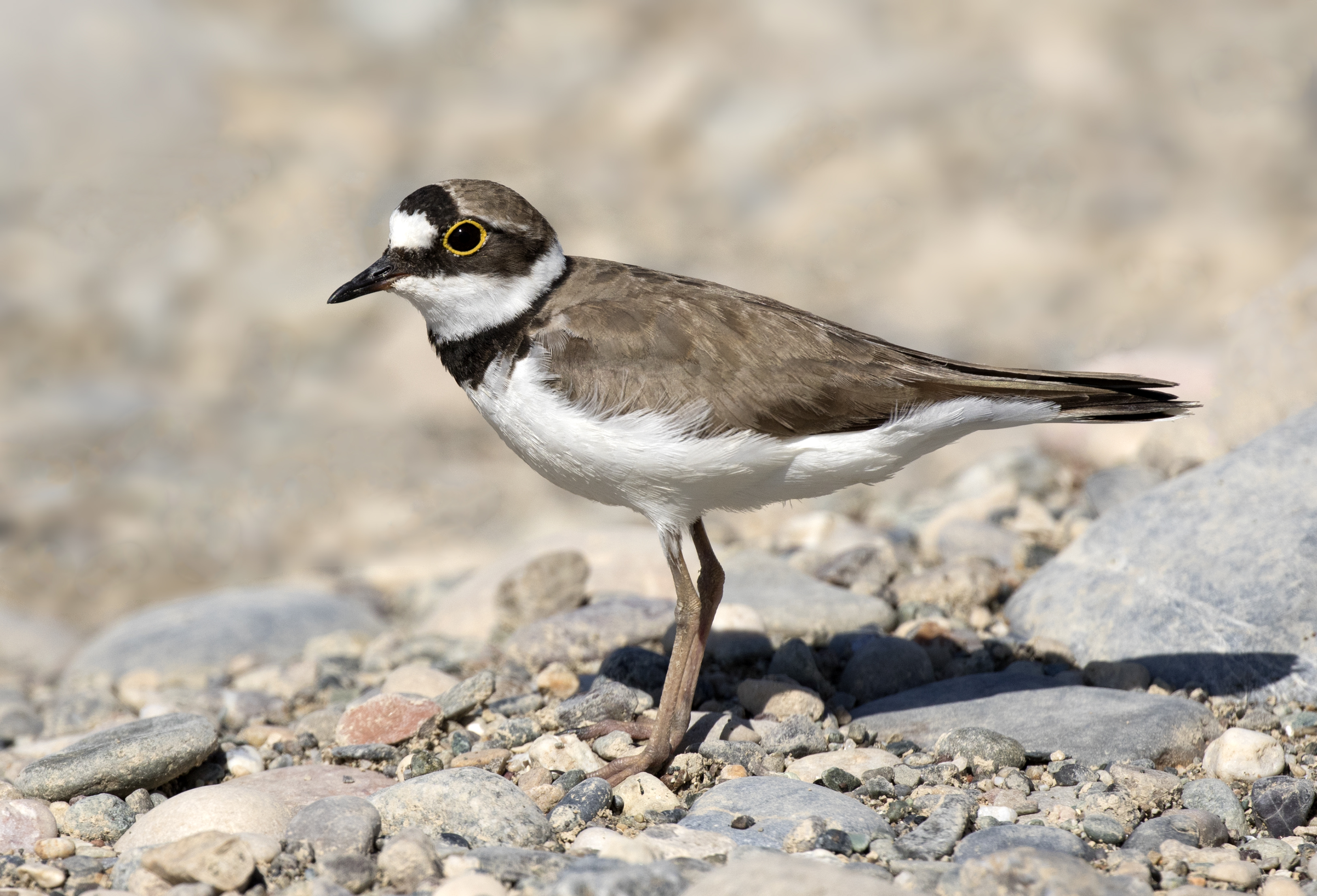
- In Kesmeburun, Osmaniye, Turkey

Conservation status
- Least Concern (IUCN 3.1)

Scientific classification
- Kingdom: Animalia
- Phylum: Chordata
- Class: Aves
- Order: Charadriiformes
- Family: Charadriidae
- Genus: Thinornis
- Species: T. dubius

Binomial name
- Thinornis dubius (Scopoli, 1786)
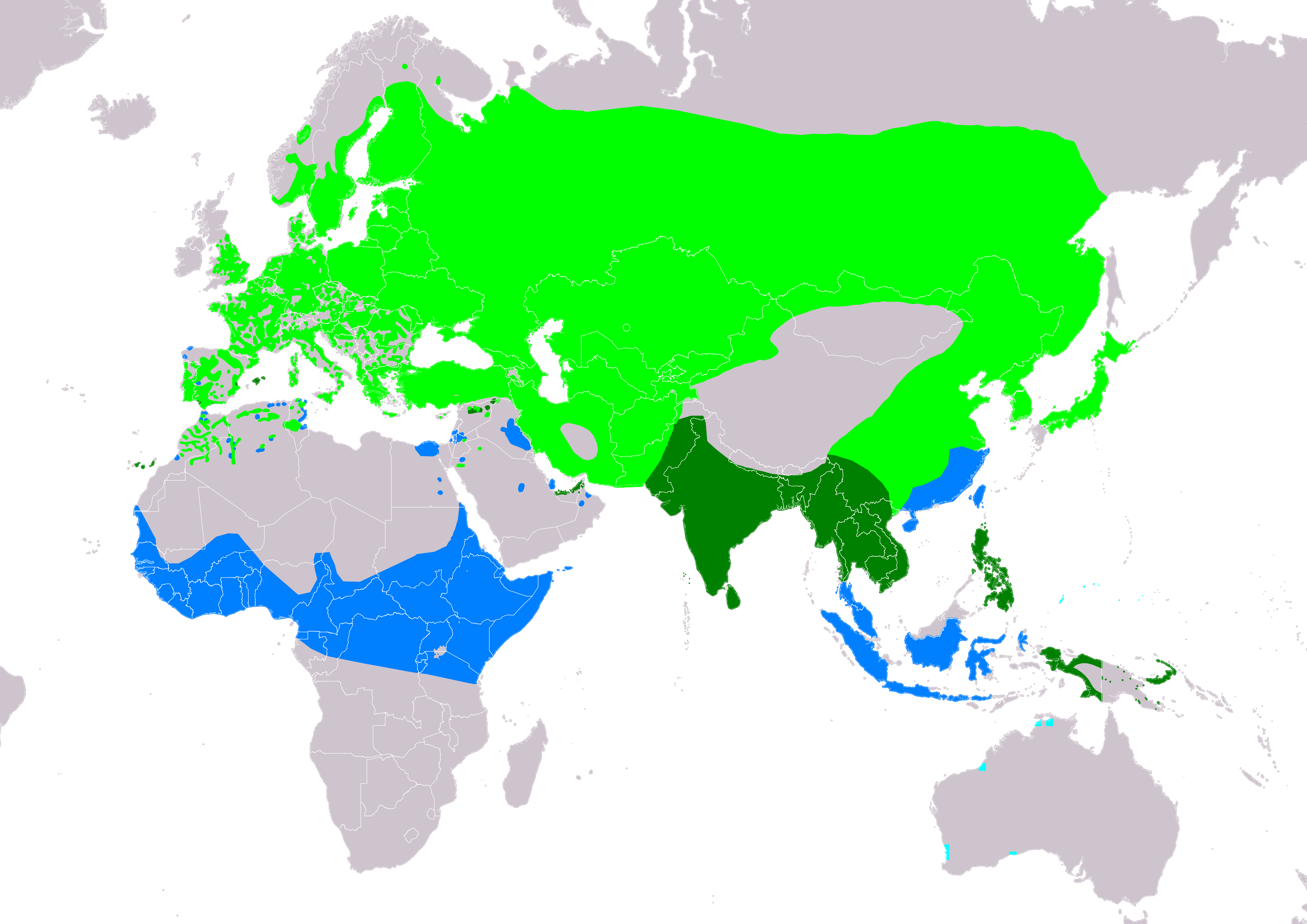
- Range of T. dubius Breeding Resident Passage Non-breeding

Synonyms
- Charadrius dubius

= Little ringed plover =

Species of bird

The little ringed plover (Thinornis dubius) is a small plover native to the Old World. It has mostly brown upperparts, a black neckband and a black mask around the eye with a noticeable yellow eyering. Its forehead, belly and the rest of the breast are white. A migratory species, it breeds in open gravel areas near freshwater, including gravel pits, islands and river edges. Its diet consists mainly of insects and worms, which it forages for in muddy areas.

== Taxonomy ==
The little ringed plover was formally described in 1786 as Chadrius dubius by the Austrian naturalist Giovanni Antonio Scopoli. The specific dubius is Latin meaning "doubtful", "uncertain" or "dubious" since French naturalist Pierre Sonnerat in 1876 had thought this bird might be just a variant of the common ringed plover. The little ringed plover is now one of seven plovers placed in the genus Thinornis that was introduced in 1789 by Johann Friedrich Gmelin. The genus name combines the Ancient Greek this meaning "beach" or "sand" with ornis meaning "bird".

Three subspecies are recognized:

- T. d. curonicus (Gmelin, JF, 1789) – breeds Palearctic from Scandinavia southward to northern Africa, eastward across Russia to Sea of Okhotsk and Ussuriland, southward through Middle East and eastward to Japan and Taiwan; winters to Africa and southern Asia
- T. d. jerdoni (Legge, WV, 1880) – India to southeastern Asia
- T. d. dubius (Scopoli, GA, 1786) – Philippines to New Guinea and Bismarck Archipelago

== Description ==
An adult little ringed plovers has a grey-brown back and wings, a white belly and a white breast with one black neckband. It has a brown cap, a white forehead, a black mask around the eyes with white above and a short dark bill. The legs are flesh-coloured and the toes are all webbed.

This species differs from the larger common ringed plover (Charadrius hiaticula) in the head pattern, leg colour, and the presence of a clear yellow eye-ring.

Call
Call of little ringed plover

== Gallery ==
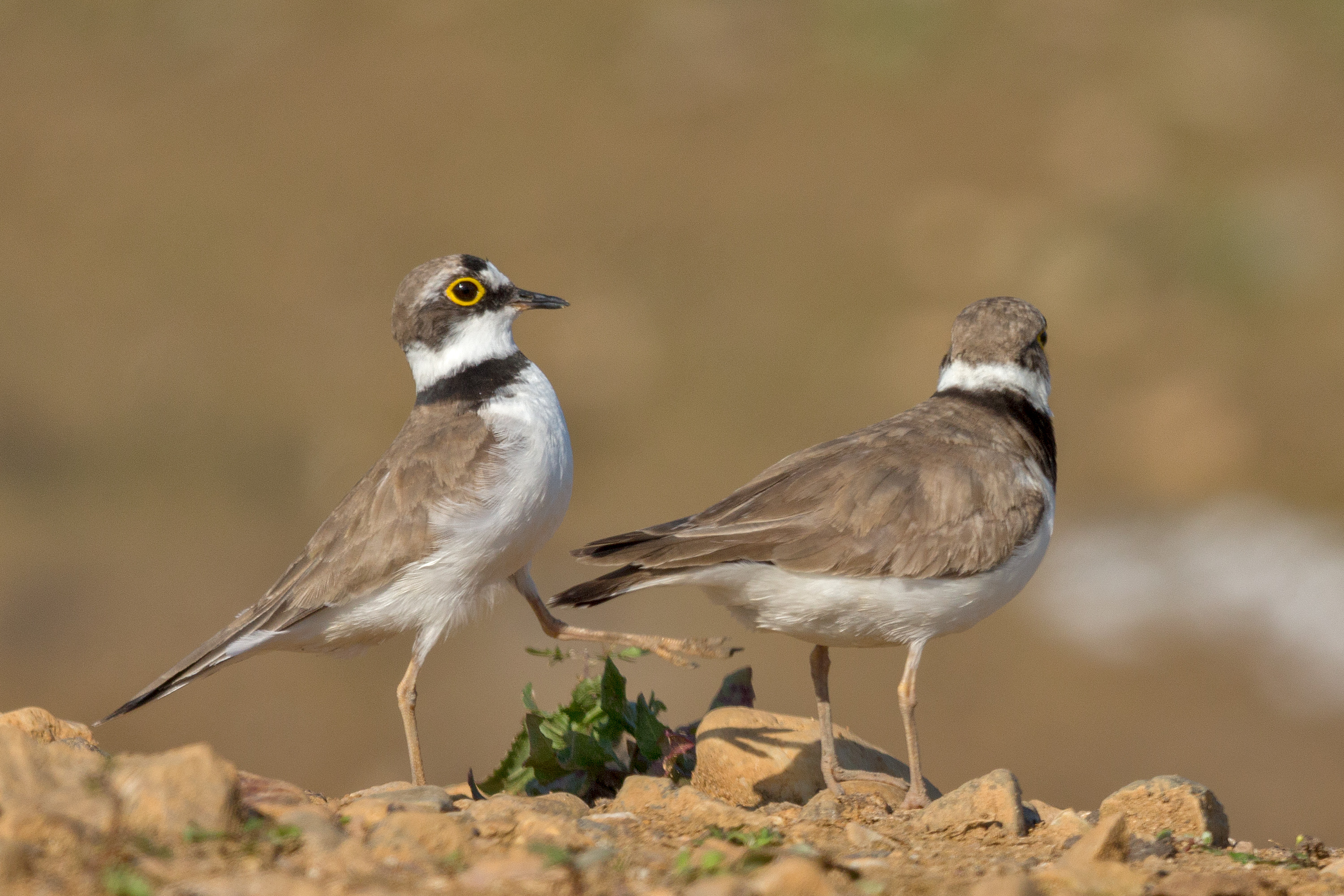
Mating, the male bird hits the cloaca of the female bird

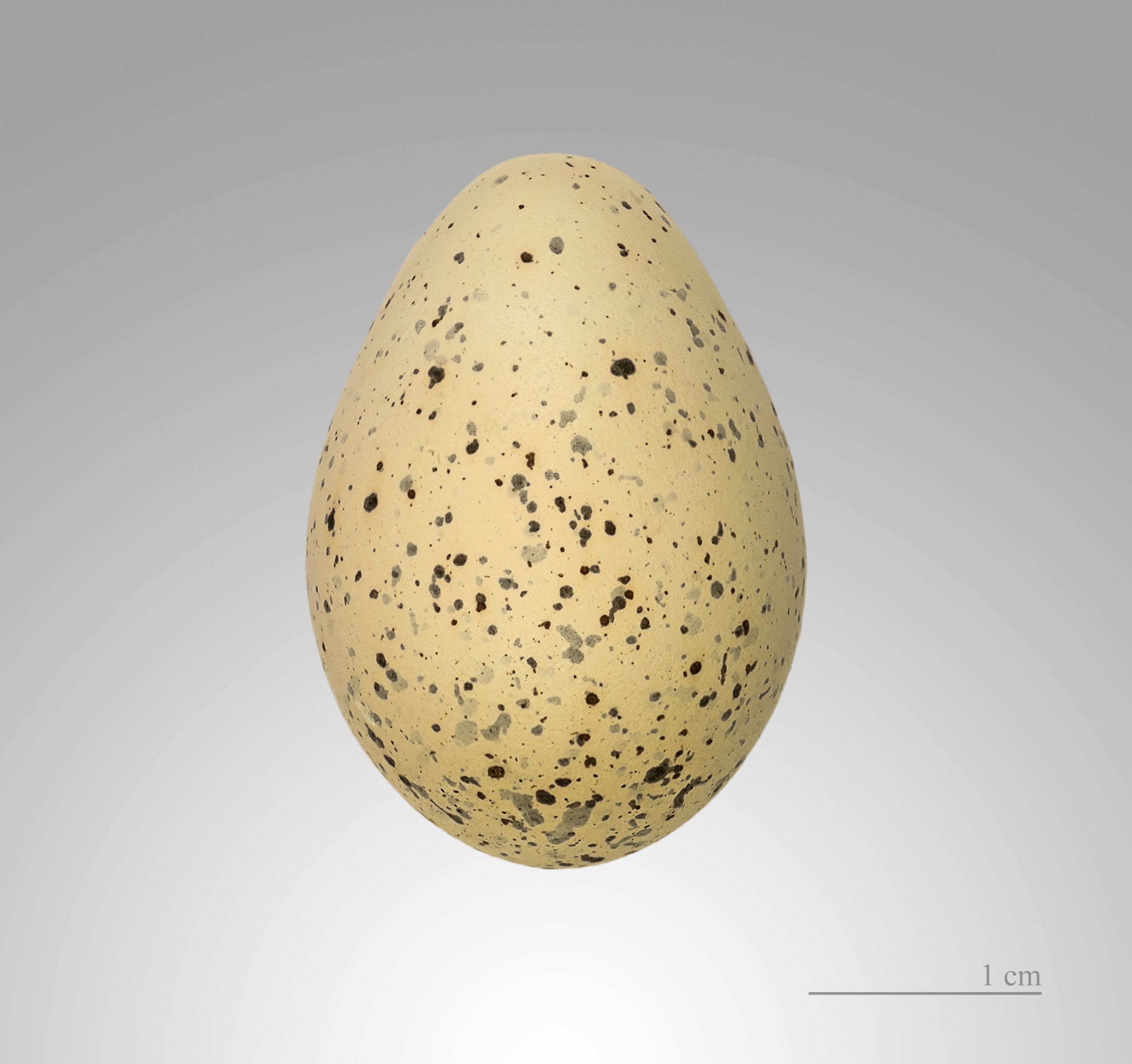
Egg of Charadrius dubius, MHNT

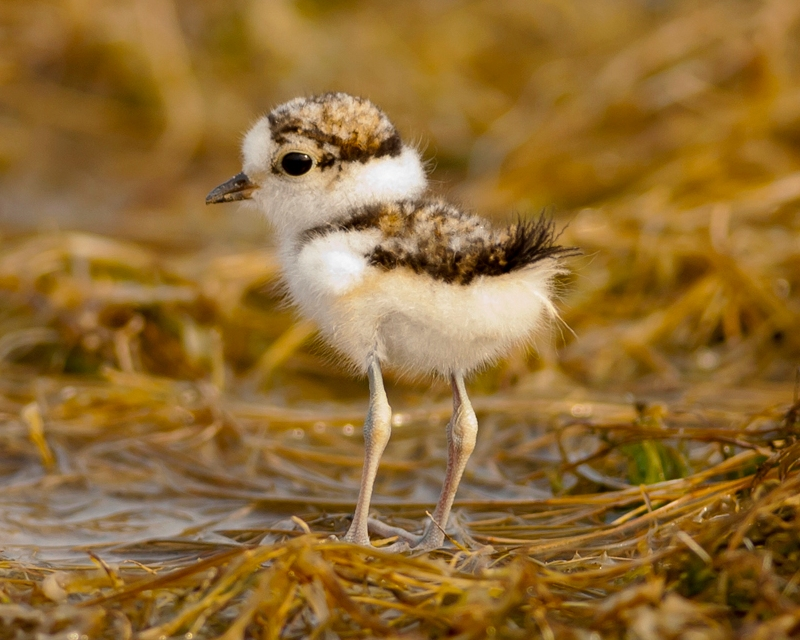
Little ringed plover chick

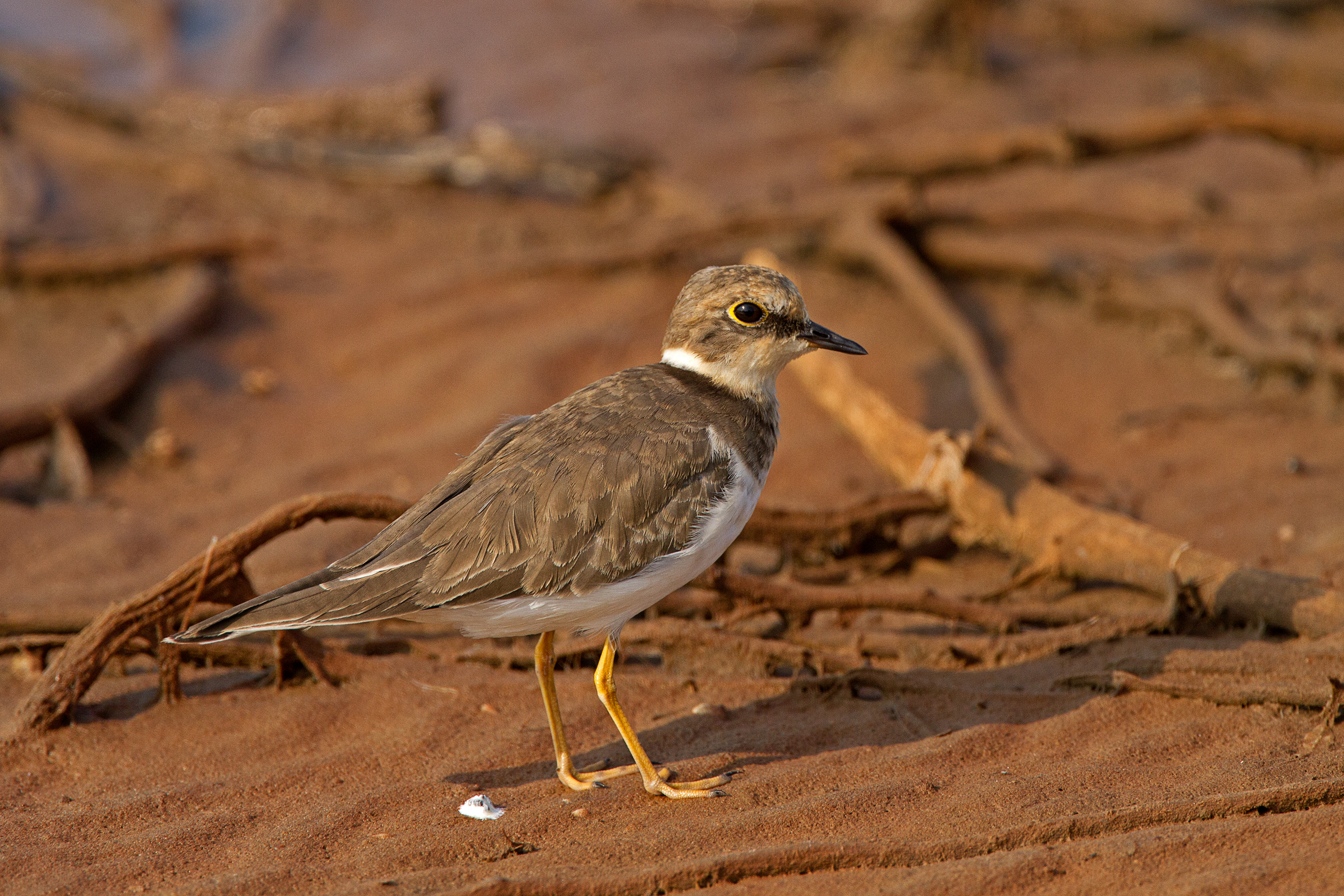
A juvenile at Pulicat Lake, India

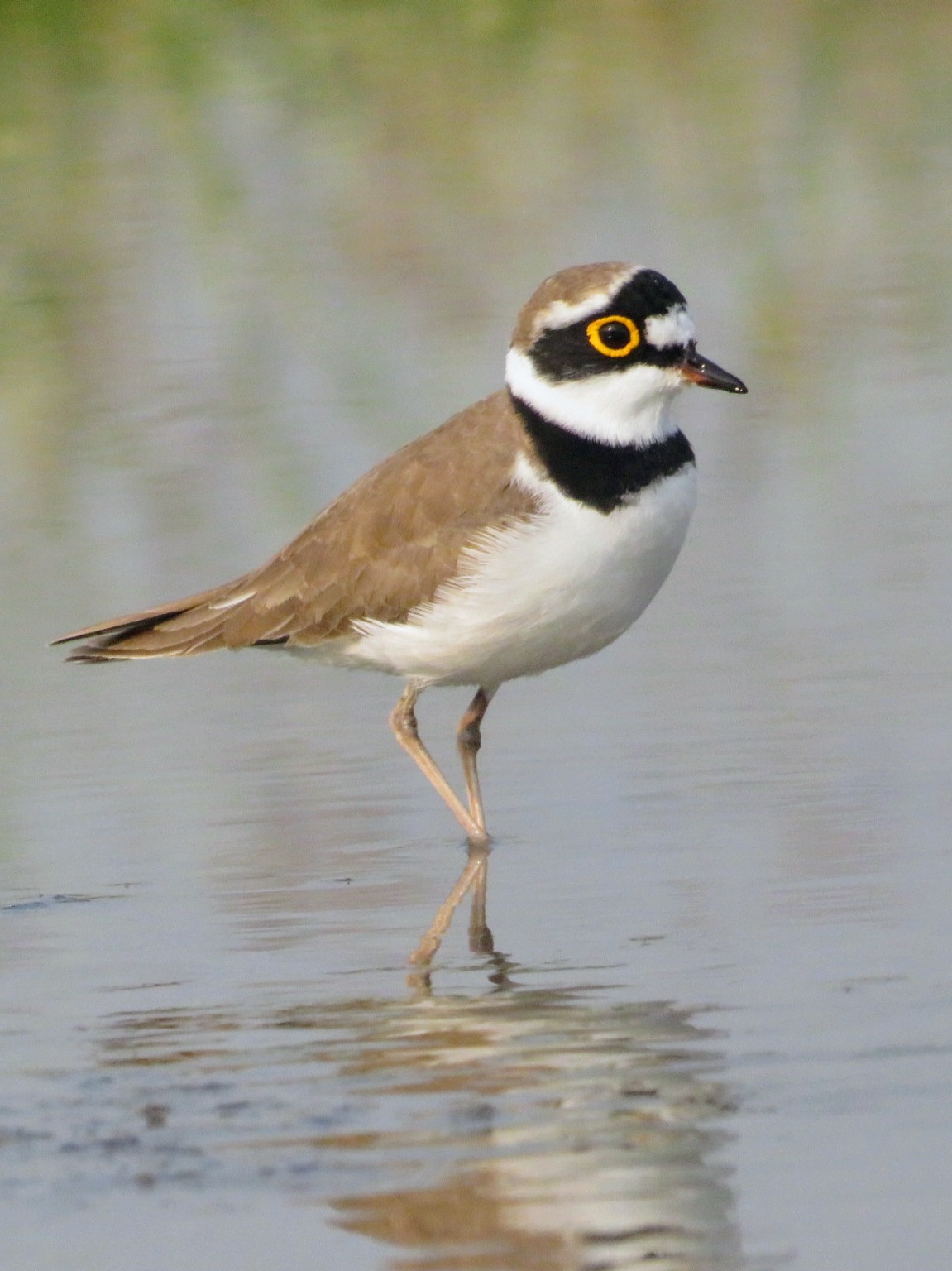
At Fulzar Dam, Jamnagar

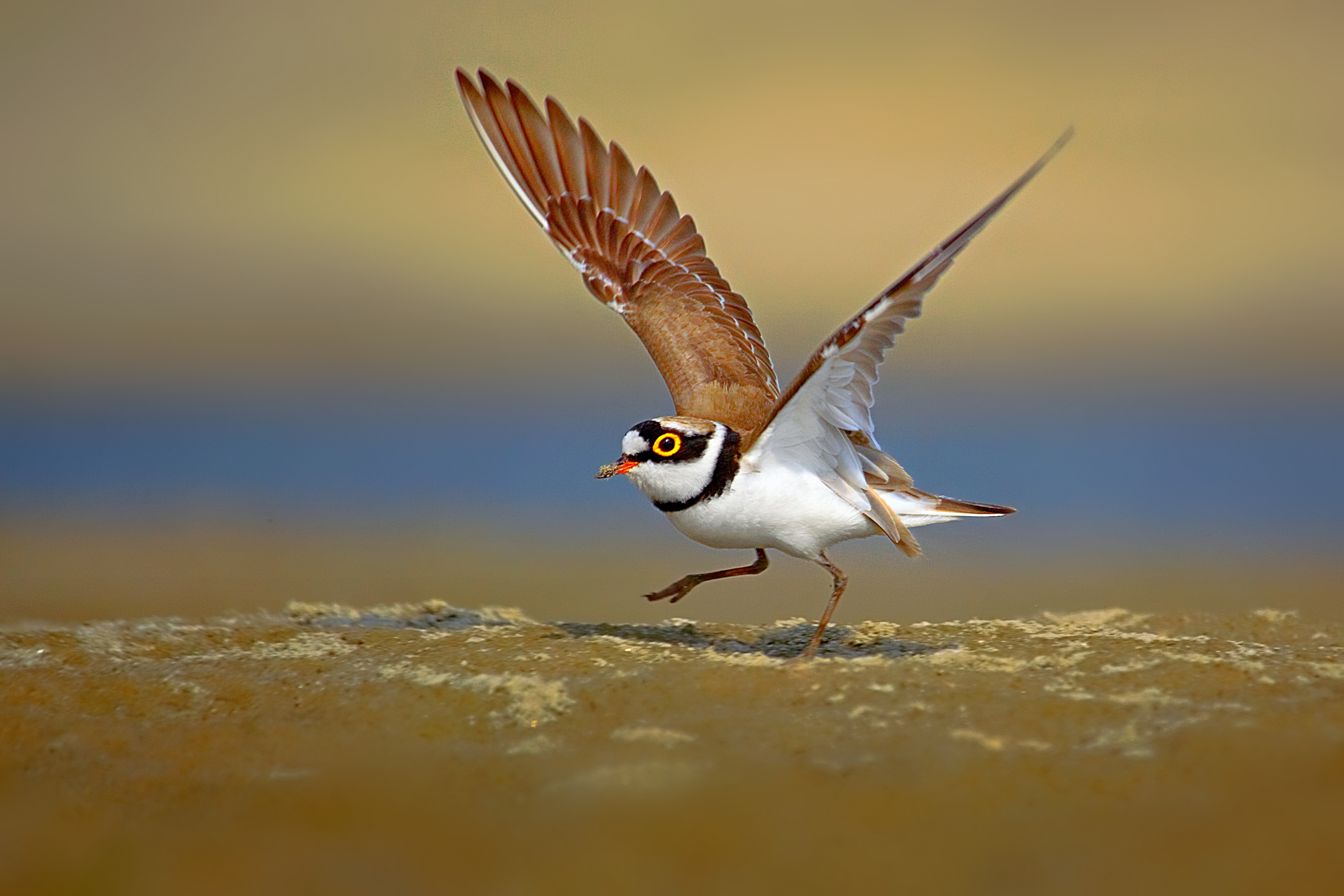
At Padma River, Bangladesh

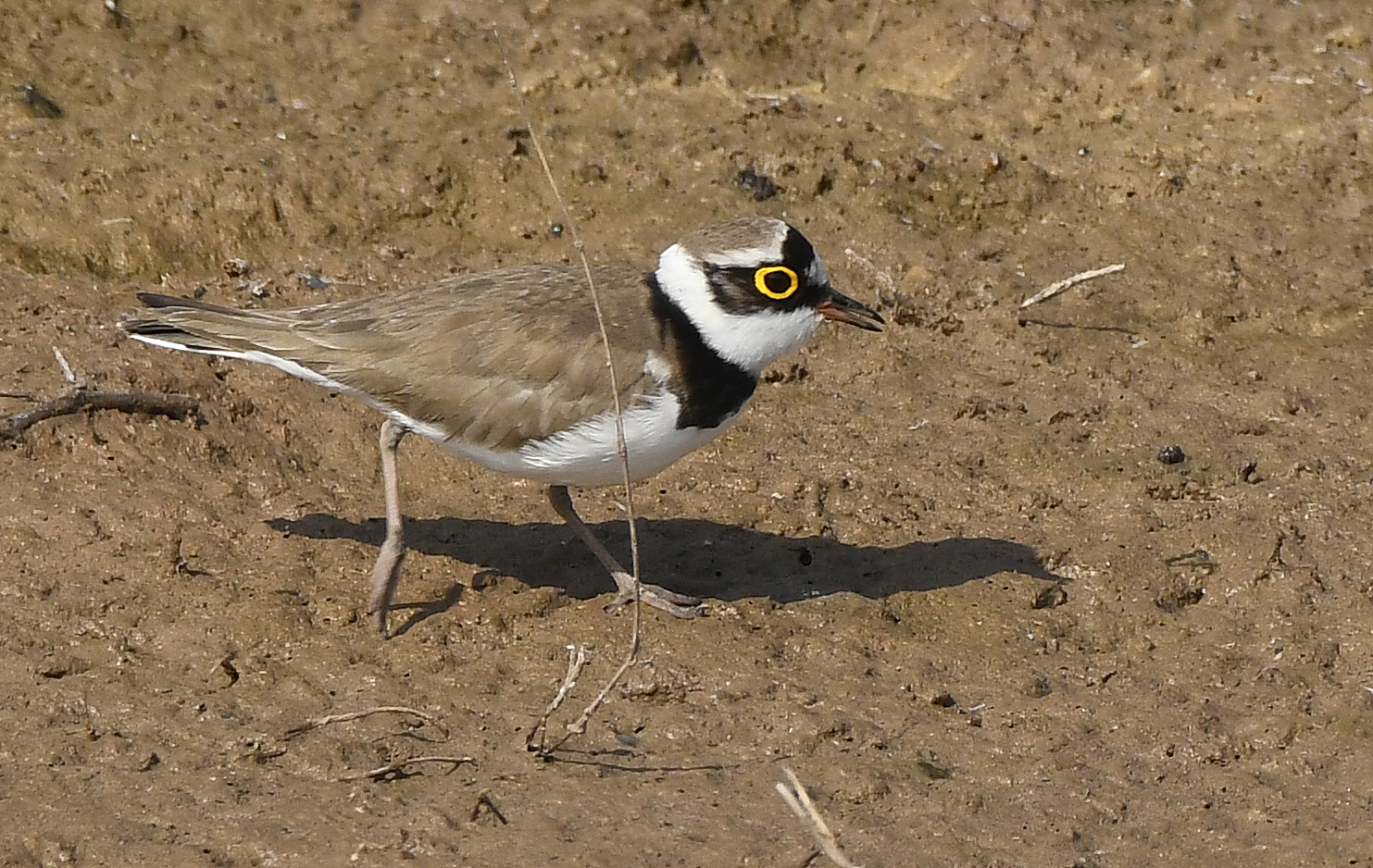
Adult in breeding plumage at Khijadiya Bird Sanctuary, Gujarat, India

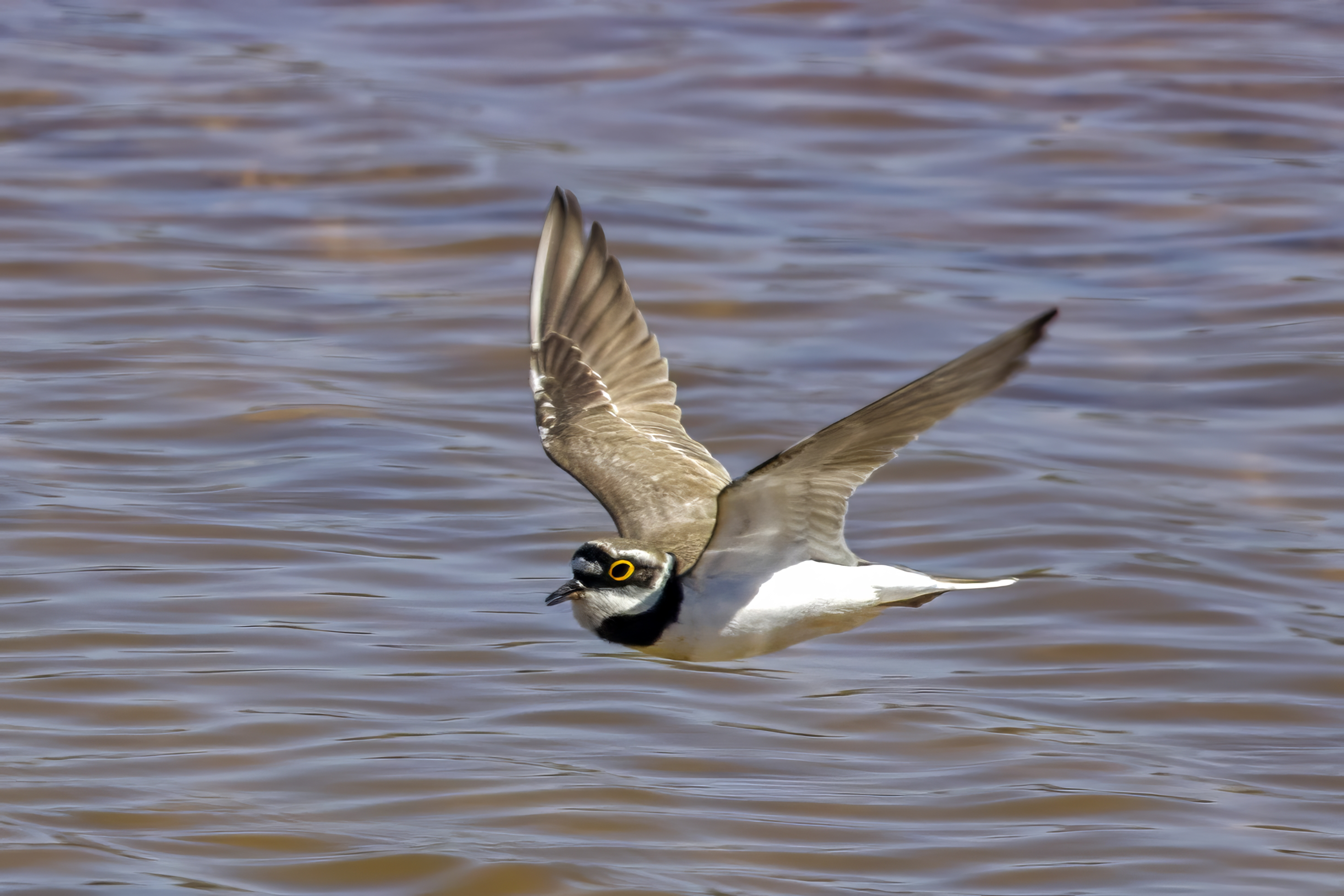
In Malta

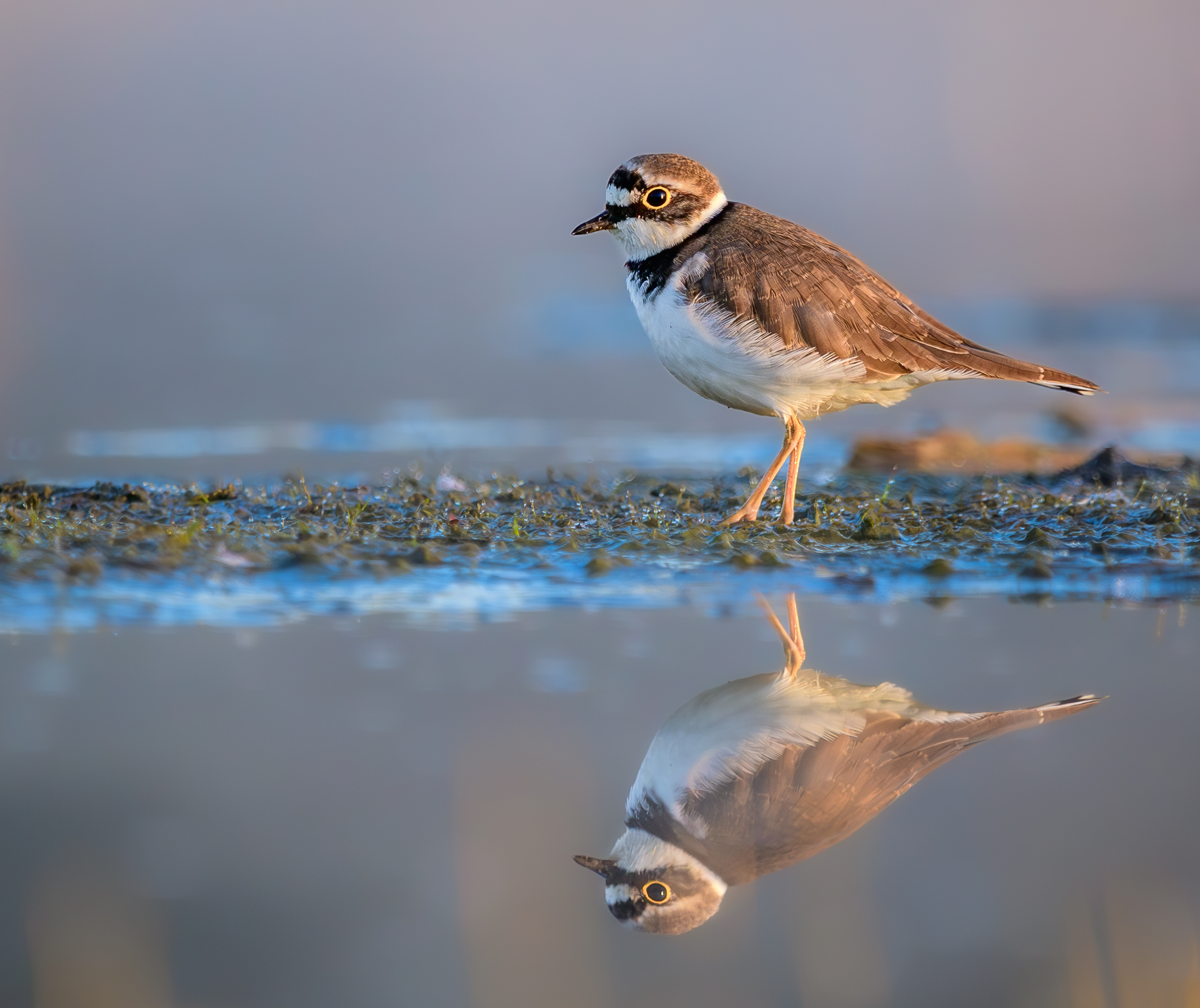
Near Roermond, Netherlands

== Habitats and range ==
Their breeding habitat is open gravel areas near freshwater, including gravel pits, islands and river edges across the Palearctic including northwestern Africa. They nest on the ground on stones with little or no plant growth. Both males and females take turns incubating the eggs.

They are migratory and winter in Africa. These birds forage for food on muddy areas, usually by sight. They eat insects and worms.

== Conservation ==
The little ringed plover is one of the species to which the Agreement on the Conservation of African-Eurasian Migratory Waterbirds (AEWA) applies. It is listed as a least concern species by the IUCN.
