= Kranich Museum =

Museum in Hessenburg, Mecklenburg-Vorpommern, Germany

Coordinates: 54°18′02″N 12°32′50″E

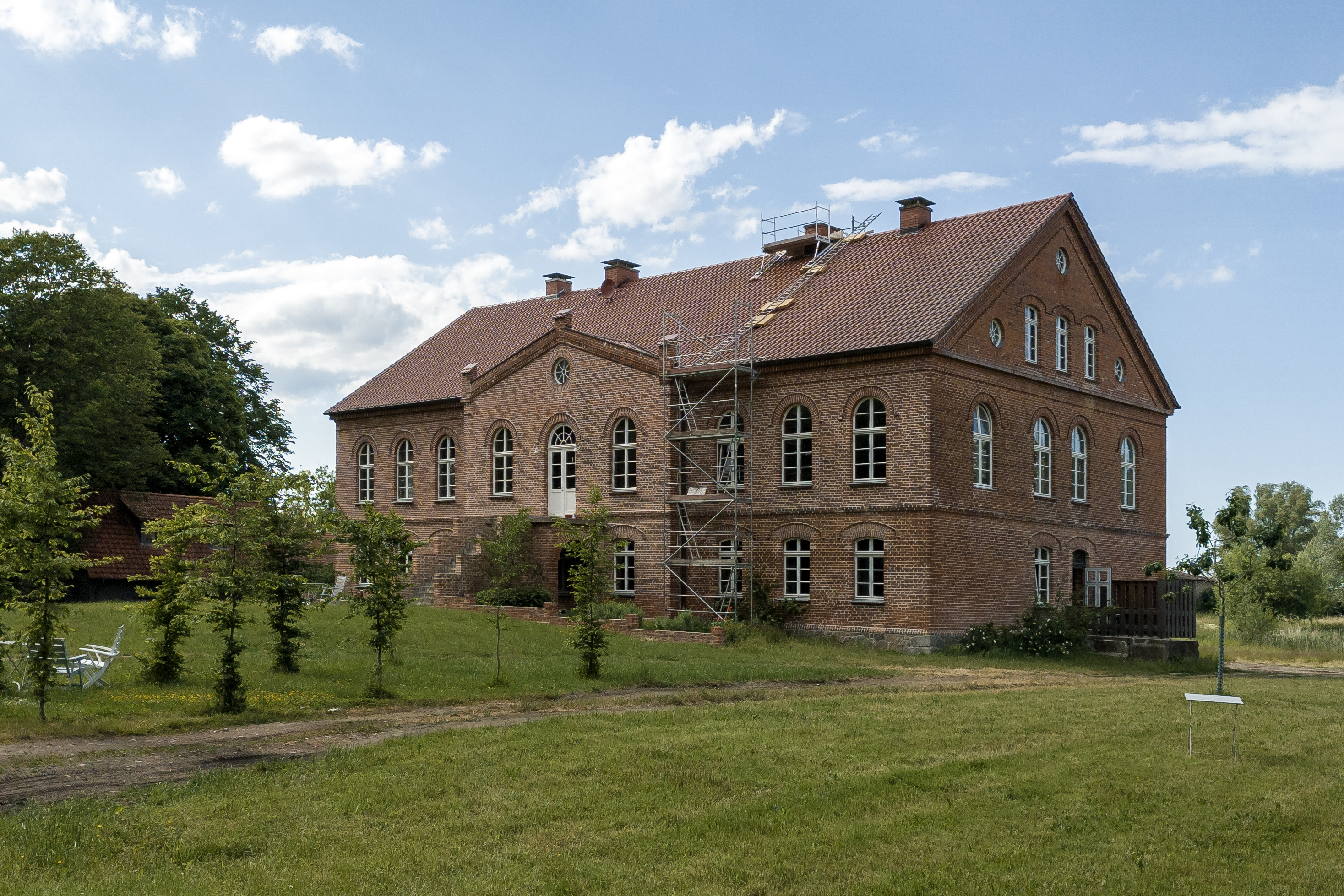
- Established: 24 September 2011
- Location: Hessenburg, Mecklenburg-Vorpommern, Germany
- Website: kranichmuseum.de

The Kranich Museum opened to the public on 24 September 2011. It is located in the village of Hessenburg in Mecklenburg-Vorpommern, Germany. It is one of 2,000 manor houses in the region and was specially restored to house a collection of international contemporary art that explores the crane, a bird that stops on the West Pomeranian plains every spring and autumn on its migratory flight from northern Europe to Spain and North Africa.

== Works ==
The new museum features sixteen permanent works curated by Khadija Carroll La and Alex Schweder La across six large galleries. The Museum is directed by Bettina Klein.

A Guide to Empathy: In III Parts by Emma Waltraud Howes and Kai Meyer is a piece that involves performance, costume, and video, of mimetic attempts to fly. "Faltungen" is a sound installation by Andy Graydon that tells the story of the folding of a thousand paper cranes. Composer Tamara Friebel's "I love you" is a mini loudspeaker and video installation which stages the dance of the brolga (Australian cranes). Ward Shelley's "Cranes Timeline" is a diagrammatic drawing depicting the evolutionary path of cranes, from the emergence on land of the amniotic egg, through the age of dinosaurs to modern birds.

Alex Schweder La's Waiting for the cranes is centered around a small field of corn planted for migrating cranes. This field is the same size as the room from which a visitor waits for the arrival of the crane. Likely never to appear, the work is about the gap between desire and gratification. The duo Hadley and Maxwell paint Maybe it is They who Watch Us, drawing on examples of various decorative styles that are a part of the building's history in various forms: as graffiti, in a mural, as a repeated pattern, and in a specially designed Toile de Jouy that pictorially tells a story of the museum itself. The fiction of the museum is affirmed in Khadija Carroll La's installation, which features Grus vigilans, a collection of stones from famous crane commentators, Aristotle, Chuang Tzu, and Virgil through to the likes of the brothers Grimm, Werner Herzog, and local collectors. An artist in residence program housed in the former coach house beside the manor will host writers and visual artists throughout the winter, who will respond to the museum's themes.

== The building ==
The museum includes twelve rooms, a library, lecture room, gift shop, café and Alte Schmiede restaurant. Layers of history are revealed in the restoration, which establishes a continuum from nineteenth century manor, to East German social housing in the post-war period, to the present. The wall text designed especially for the building and tuckpointed into its walls with a mixture of crane bone, ink, and mortar evoke the poetic in history.

== History ==
The museum building was renovated by a team of artists and builders in response to the existing architectural elements. The history of the Hessenburg estate goes back to the beginnings of the settlement of the region. Documented in the late 13th century as a fortress with moat belonging to the knight Antonius von dem Bughe, the village appears again in 1696, when the Swedish conquerors documented it in detail as Schlechtemühl, renamed in 1840 after the new owners von Hesse who built a late classical manor house and Neo-baroque landscape garden including ancient trees. Today, buildings such as the 250-year-old smithy, seasonal farmer's house, inspector's house with school, stables that were in use until 1990, and an old ice house all remain on the site. A library of historical videos are available to view in the salon.

Curator, Carroll La is quoted as saying: “The museum is in the vein of Museums Insel Homboerch or La Fundación Chinati, the Hessenburg estate and park offers an experience of art and architecture that responds to its powerful natural setting. It is also comparable to Paris’s Musée de la Chasse et de la Nature, the exhibition is complementary to the natural history of the crane.”

The Kranich Museum is sponsored by Förderung der integrierten ländlichen Entwicklung (ILERL M-V) 2011.
