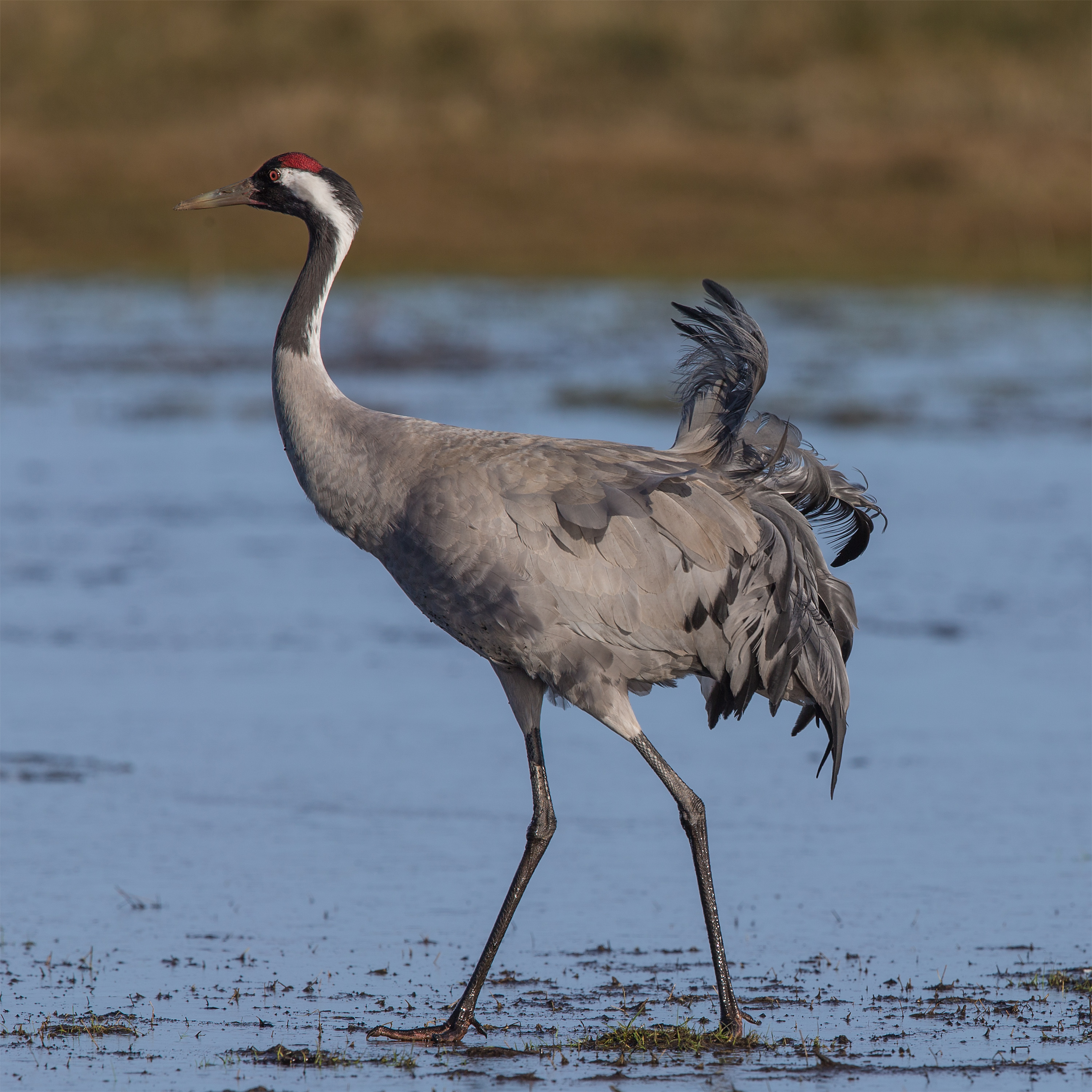
- Grus grus in Ribnitz-Damgarten, Germany

Conservation status
- Least Concern (IUCN 3.1)
- CITES Appendix II

Scientific classification
- Kingdom: Animalia
- Phylum: Chordata
- Class: Aves
- Order: Gruiformes
- Family: Gruidae
- Genus: Grus
- Species: G. grus

Binomial name
- Grus grus (Linnaeus, 1758)
- The range of the common crane Extant (non-breeding) Extant (resident) Extant (breeding)

Synonyms
- Ardea grus Linnaeus, 1758; Grus turfa Portis, 1884; Grus primigenia Milne-Edwards, 1871

Audio

= Common crane =

Common crane Temporal range: Piacenzian–Present

Species of bird also known as Eurasian crane

The common crane (Grus grus), also known as the Eurasian crane, is a bird of the family Gruidae, the cranes. A medium-sized species, it is the only crane commonly found in Europe besides the demoiselle crane (Grus virgo) and the Siberian crane (Leucogeranus leucogeranus) that only are regular in the far eastern part of the continent. Along with the sandhill crane (Antigone canadensis), demoiselle crane and the brolga (Antigone rubicunda), it is one of only four crane species not currently classified as threatened with extinction or conservation dependent on the species level. Despite the species' large numbers, local extinctions and extirpations have taken place in part of its range, and an ongoing reintroduction project is underway in the United Kingdom.

== Taxonomy ==
The first formal description of the common crane was by the Swedish naturalist Carl Linnaeus in 1758 in the tenth edition of his Systema Naturae under the binomial name Ardea grus. The current genus Grus was erected by the French zoologist Mathurin Jacques Brisson in 1760. Grus is the Latin word for a "crane". The species is considered to be monotypic: no subspecies are recognised.

== Description ==
The common crane is a large, stately bird and a medium-sized crane. It is 100–130 cm (39–51 in) long with a 180–240 cm (71–94 in) wingspan. The body weight can range from 3 to 6.1 kg (6.6 to 13.4 lb), with the nominate subspecies averaging around 5.4 kg (12 lb) and the eastern subspecies (G. g. lilfordi) averaging 4.6 kg (10 lb). Among standard measurements, the wing chord is 50.7–60.8 cm (20.0–23.9 in) long, the tarsus is 20.1–25.2 cm (7.9–9.9 in) and the exposed culmen is 9.5–11.6 cm (3.7–4.6 in).

Males are slightly heavier and larger than females, with weight showing the largest sexual size dimorphism, followed by wing, central toe, and head length in adults and juveniles.

This species is slate-grey overall. The forehead and lores are blackish with a bare red crown and a white streak extending from behind the eyes to the upper back. The overall colour is darkest on the back and rump and palest on the breast and wings. The primaries, the tips of secondaries, the alula, the tip of the tail, and the edges of upper tail coverts are all black and the greater coverts droop into explosive plumes. This combination of colouration ultimately distinguishes it from similar species in Asia, like the hooded (G. monacha) and black-necked cranes (G. nigricollis). The juvenile has yellowish-brown tips to its body feathers and lacks the drooping wing feathers and the bright neck pattern of the adult, and has a fully feathered crown. Every two years, before migration, the adult common crane undergoes a complete moult, remaining flightless for six weeks, until the new feathers grow.

It has a loud trumpeting call, given in flight and display. The call is piercing and can be heard from a considerable distance. It has a dancing display, leaping with wings uplifted, described in detail below.

== Distribution ==
The common crane breeds in Europe and across the Palearctic to Siberia. By far the largest breeding populations can be found in Russia, Finland and Sweden. It is a rare breeder in southern and western Europe, with larger numbers breeding in the central and eastern parts of the continent. It has reappeared in several western European countries where it had been extirpated as a breeding bird decades or even centuries ago, including the United Kingdom and, since 2021, the Republic of Ireland. In Russia, it breeds as far east at the Chukchi Peninsula. In Asia, the breeding range of the common crane extends as far south as northern China, Turkey and the Caucasus region.

The species is a migrant and common cranes that breed in Europe predominantly winter in Portugal, Spain and northern Africa. Autumn migration is from August to October in the breeding areas, but from late October to early December at the wintering sites. Spring migration starts in February at wintering sites up to early March, but from March through May at the breeding areas. Migration phenology of common cranes is changing due to climate change. Hydraulic models can be used to estimate the number of days that unmarked cranes remain in a given area during the spring migration. These models are developed using data from crane censuses conducted at spring migration stopover sites. Important staging areas occur anywhere from Sweden, the Netherlands and Germany to China (with a large one around the Caspian Sea) and many thousand cranes can be seen in one day in the Autumn. Some birds winter elsewhere in southern Europe, including Portugal and France. During mild winters, some may stay near their breeding locations year-round, even in northwestern Europe. Common cranes that breed in far eastern Europe, including European Russia, winter in the river valleys of Sudan, Ethiopia, Tunisia and Eritrea with smaller numbers in Turkey, northern Israel, Iraq and parts of Iran. The third major wintering region, primarily used by those breeding in central Russia, is in the northern half of the Indian subcontinent, including Pakistan. Minimal wintering also occurs in Burma, Vietnam and Thailand. Lastly, the easternmost breeders winter in eastern China, where they are often the most common crane. Migrating flocks fly in a "V" formation.

It is a rare visitor to Japan and Korea, mostly blown over from the Chinese wintering population, and is a rare vagrant to western North America, where birds are occasionally seen with flocks of migrating sandhill cranes.

== Habitat ==
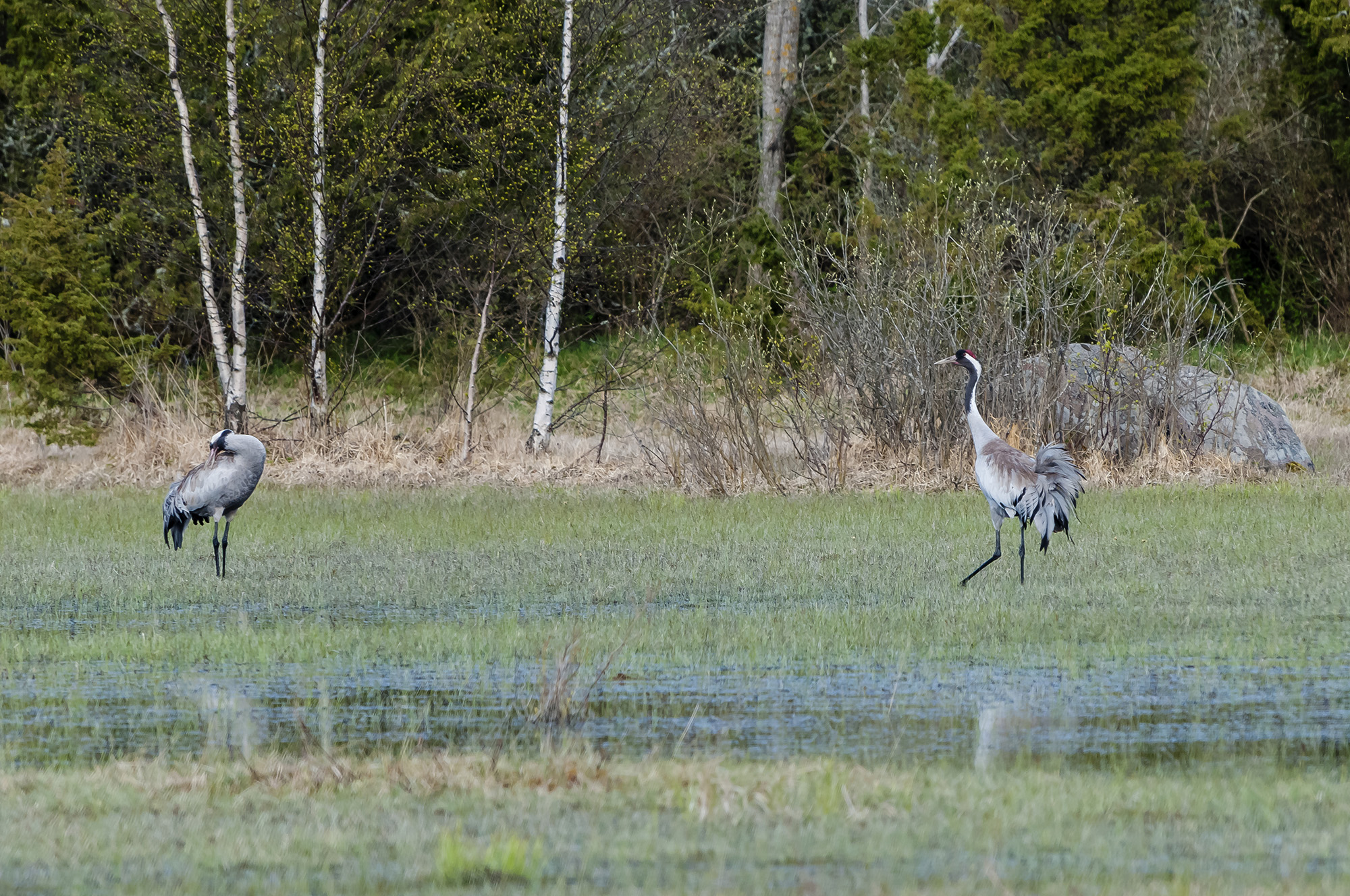
Common cranes in Osmussaar, Estonia. Wetlands are preferred habitats for the cranes.

In Europe, the common crane predominantly breeds in boreal and taiga forest and mixed forests, from an elevation of sea-level to 2,200 m (7,200 ft). In northern climes, it breeds in treeless moors, on bogs, or on dwarf heather habitats, usually where small lakes or pools are also found. In Sweden, breeders are usually found in small, swampy openings amongst pine forests, while in Germany, marshy wetlands are used. Breeding habitat used in Russia are similar, though they can be found nesting in less likely habitat such as steppe and even semi-desert, so long as water is near. Primarily, the largest number of common cranes are found breeding in wooded swamps, bogs and wetlands and seem to require quiet, peaceful environs with minimal human interference. They occur at low density as breeders even where common, typically ranging from 1 to 5 pairs per 100 km^{2} (39 sq mi).

In winter, this species moves to flooded areas, shallow sheltered bays, and swampy meadows. During the flightless moulting period there is a need for shallow waters or high reed cover for concealment. Later, after the migration period, the birds winter regularly in open country, often on cultivated lands and sometimes also in savanna-like areas, for example on the Iberian Peninsula.

== Behaviour ==
=== Diet ===
The common crane is omnivorous, as are all cranes. It largely eats plant matter, including roots, rhizomes, tubers, stems, leaves, fruits and seeds. They also commonly eat, when available, pond-weeds, heath berries, peas, potatoes, olives, acorns, cedar nuts and pods of peanuts. Notably amongst the berries consumed, the cranberry, is possibly named after the species.

Animal foods become more important during the summer breeding season and may be the primary food source at that time of year, especially while regurgitating to young. Their animal foods are insects, especially dragonflies, crickets, and also snails, earthworms, crabs, spiders, millipedes, woodlice, fish, amphibians, rodents, and small birds.

Common cranes may either forage on land or in shallow water, probing around with their bills for any edible organism. Although crops may locally be damaged by the species, they mostly consume waste grain in winter from previously harvested fields and so actually benefit farmers by cleaning fields for use in the following year. As with other cranes, all foraging (as well as drinking and roosting) is done in small groups, which may variously consist of pairs, family groups or winter flocks.

=== Breeding ===
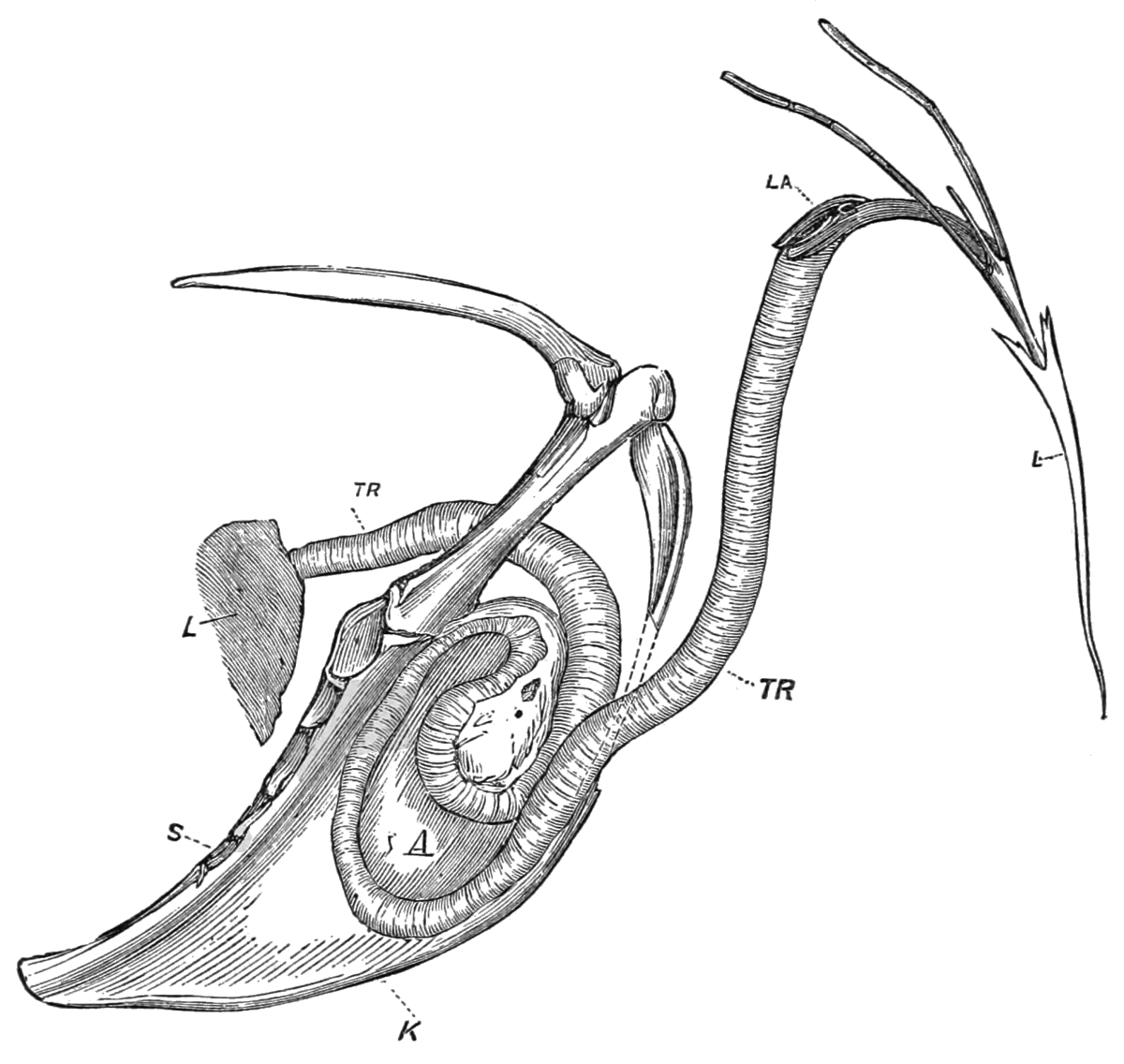
The long coiled trachea (TR) penetrating the sternum (S, K, A) produces the trumpeting calls of the crane. L on the left - lungs, LA - larynx, L on the right - tongue.

This species usually lays eggs in May, though seldom will do so earlier or later. Like most cranes, this species displays indefinite monogamous pair bonds. If one mate dies, a crane may attempt to court a new mate the following year. Although a pair may be together for many years, the courtship rituals of the species are enacted by every pair each spring. The dancing of common cranes has complex, social meanings and may occur at almost any time of year. Dancing may include bobs, bows, pirouettes, and stops, as in various crane species. Aggressive displays may include ruffled wing feathers, throwing vegetation in the air and pointing the bare red patch on their heads at each other. Courtship displays begin with a male following the female in a stately, march-like walk. The unison call, consists of the female holding her head up and gradually lowering down as she calls out. The female calls out a high note and then the male follows with a longer scream in a similar posture. Copulation consists of a similar, dramatic display.

pair showing the mating behavior

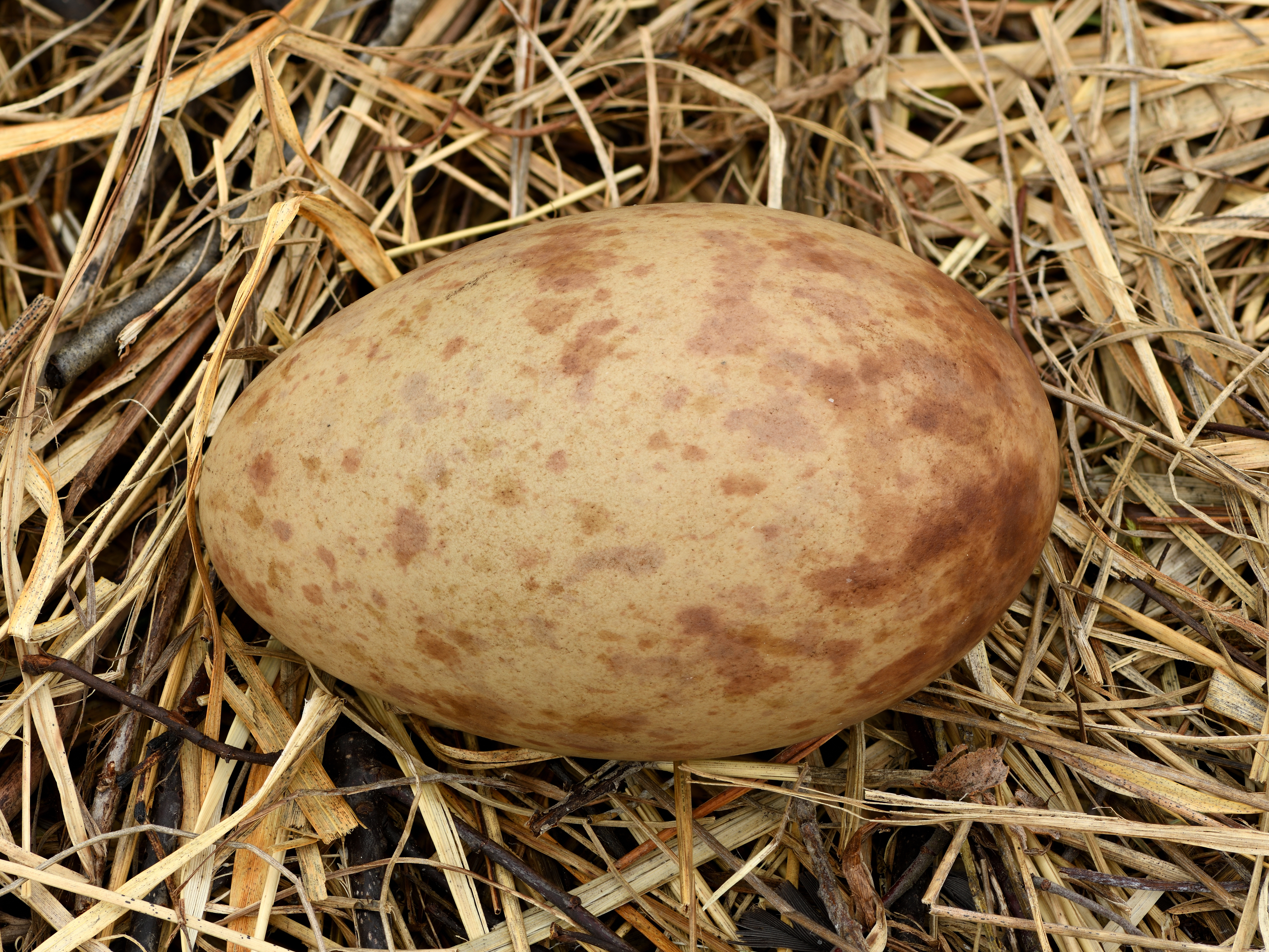
Egg on nest

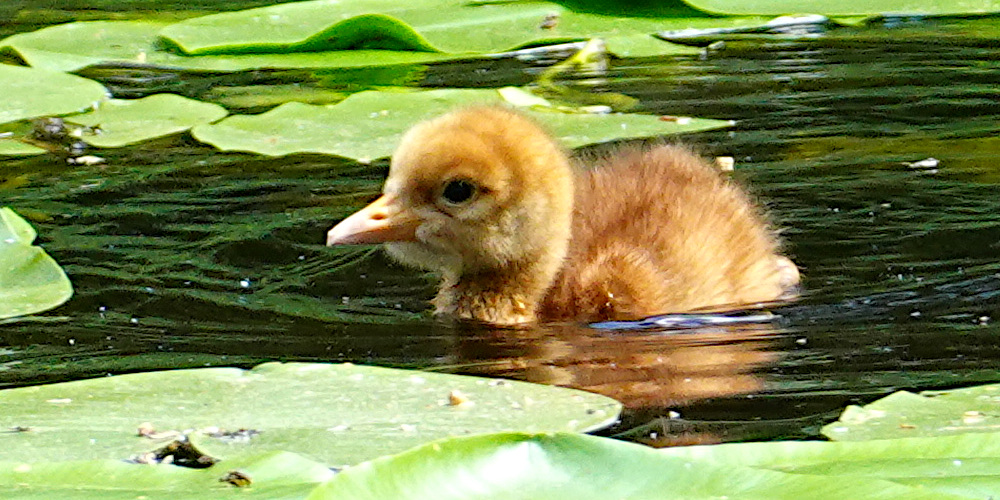
Chick on the Tidan River, Sweden

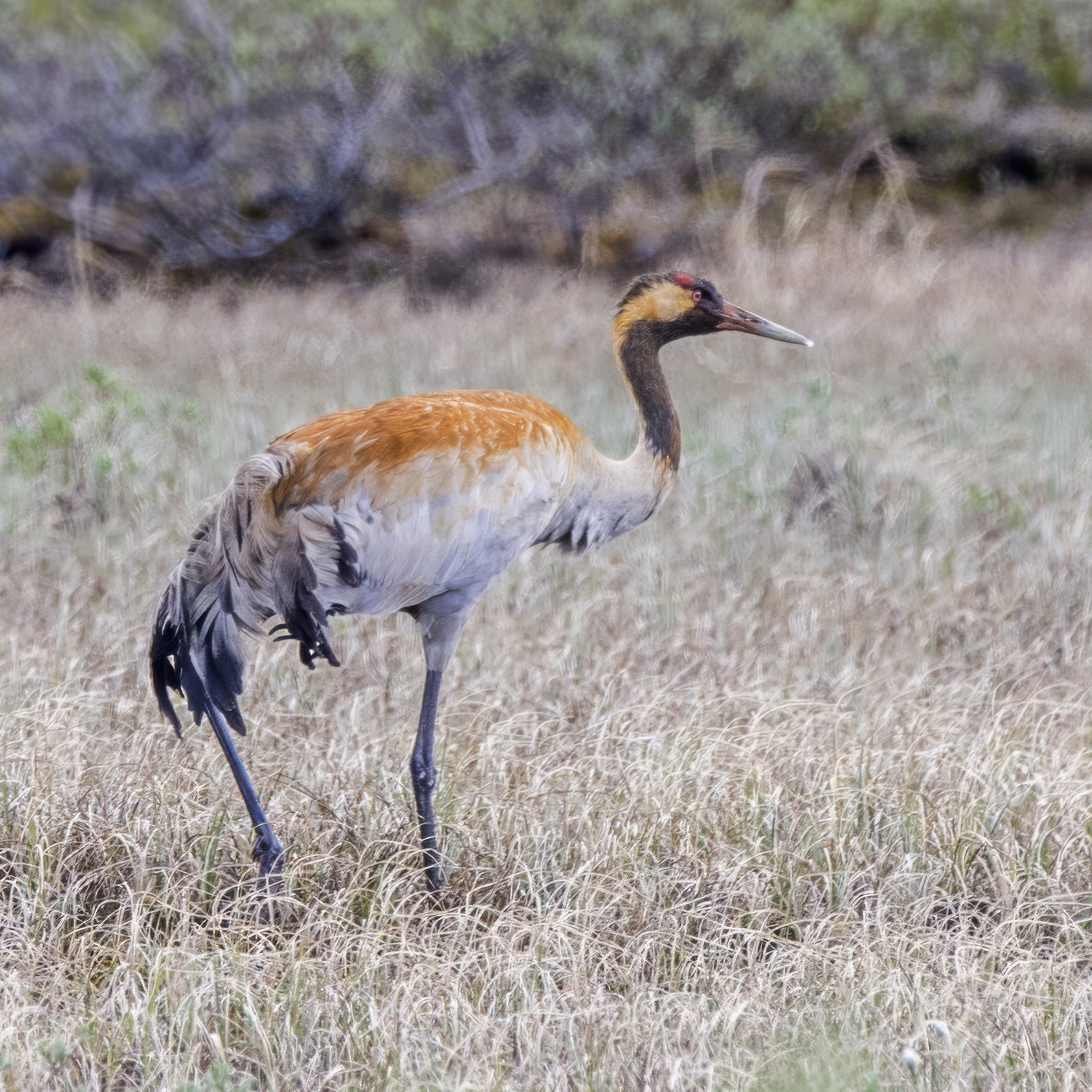
Juvenile in Norway, showing developing adult plumage

The nesting territory of common cranes is variable and is based on the local habitat. It can range in size from variously 2 to 500 ha (4.9 to 1,235.5 acres). In common with sandhill cranes (and no other crane species), common cranes "paint" their bodies with mud or decaying vegetation, apparently in order to blend into their nesting environment. The nest is either in or very near shallow water, often with dense shore vegetation nearby, and may be used over several years. The size and placement of the nest varies considerably over the range, with Arctic birds building relatively small nests. In Sweden, an average nest is around 90 cm (35 in) across.

The clutch of the common crane usually contains two eggs, with seldom one laid and, even more rarely, 3 or 4. If a clutch is lost early in incubation, the cranes may be able to lay another one within a couple of weeks. The incubation period is around 30 days and is done primarily by the female but occasionally by both sexes. If humans approach the nest both parents may engage in a distraction display but known ground predators (including domestic dogs (Canis lupus familiaris)) are physically attacked almost immediately.

New hatchlings are generally quite helpless but are able to crawl away from danger within a few hours, can swim soon after hatching and can run with their parents at 24 hours old. Chicks respond to danger by freezing, using their camouflaged brownish down to defend them beyond their fierce parents. Young chicks use their wings to stabilise them while running, while by 9 weeks of age they can fly short distances. The adult birds go through their postbreeding moult while caring for their young, rendering them flightless for about 5 to 6 weeks around the time the young also can't fly yet. According to figures of cranes wintering in Spain, around 48% birds have surviving young by the time they winter and around 18% are leading two young by winter. By the next breeding season, the previous years young often flock together. The age of sexual maturity in wild birds has been estimated at variously from 3 to 6 years of age.

=== Longevity ===
This species can live up to 30 or 40 years, though the data on maximum longevity (43 years) and life expectancy (12 years, N=7 cranes) were published with captive cranes. Common cranes living in the wild generally show shorter lives. Successful breeders, the best subjects in the population, are calculated to live on average 12 years. Unsuccessful breeding cranes may have shorter lives. Elementary survival analysis with the Euring database reports a life expectancy at birth (LEB) of c. 5 years. This LEB of 5 years was similar to that estimated for other crane species, as for example the Florida sandhill cranes (G. canadensis) (LEB = 7 years). Reports of tagged common cranes have increased rapidly in the last decades; therefore, longevity and life expectancy at birth of wild common cranes is expected to be updated.

The species has however proved highly vulnerable to the highly pathogenic avian influenza (HPAI) outbreaks, with mass mortality of over 18,000 birds in Germany and 15,000–20,000 in France in autumn 2025.

=== Sociality ===
The common crane is a fairly social bird while not breeding. Flocks of up to 400 birds may be seen flying together during migration. Staging sites, where migrating birds gather to rest and feed in the middle of their migration, may witness thousands of cranes gathering at once. However, the flocks of the species are not stable social units but rather groups that ensure greater safety in numbers and collectively draw each other's attention to ideal foraging and roosting sites. Possibly due to a longer molt, younger and non-breeding cranes are usually the earliest fall migrants and may band together at that time of year. During these migratory flights, common cranes have been known to fly at altitudes of up to 10,000 m (33,000 ft), one of the highest of any species of bird, second only to the Ruppell's vulture.

Cranes use a kleptoparasitic strategy to recover from temporary reductions in feeding rate, particularly when the rate is below the threshold of intake necessary for survival. When crane density is very high, such disturbances during foraging can occur frequently and reduce the flock's overall feeding rate. Accumulated intake of common cranes during daytime at a site of stopover and wintering shows a typical anti-sigmoid shape, with greatest increases of intake after dawn and before dusk. In winter the common crane behaves as a bayesian forager, which trade off maximization of food intake rate with benefits of remaining in a flock. They followed simple rate-maximizing rules only in patches where energy return was slower than that needed to meet 24-h requirements. However, they left rich patches earlier than expected probably sacrificing intake rate to remain in the foraging flock.

During the winter months, dominant cranes tend to pick new foraging areas where there are more cranes and food. Conversely, subordinate cranes tend to go to areas with fewer birds when switching to a new foraging area in the morning. Dominant cranes remain more faithful to their preferred foraging zone, whereas subordinate cranes are more mobile and switch between zones more frequently. On days when they switch to a new foraging area in winter, dominant cranes leave the roost later than subordinate cranes. This could be used to track the main flow of departures. Some crane families do not change their foraging areas during the winter months, but instead establish a foraging territory as long as there is enough food to feed their young. These families defend their foraging territories against other faimilies during the day, gathering at night with other cranes in communal roosts.

=== Interspecies interactions ===
There are few natural predators of adult cranes, although white-tailed eagle (Haliaeetus albicilla), Bonelli's eagle (Aquila fasciata), eastern imperial eagle (Aquila heliaca) and golden eagle (Aquila chrysaetos) are a potential predatory threat to common cranes of all ages. The crane has been known to counterattack eagles both on the land and in mid-flight, using their bill as a weapon and kicking with their feet. Mammals such as wild boar (Sus scrofa), wolverine (Gulo gulo) and red foxes (Vulpes vulpes) are attacked at the nest. Herbivorous mammals such as red deer (Cervus elaphus) may also be attacked at the nest, indicating the high aggressiveness of the birds while nesting. The determined attack of a parent crane often assures safety from predators including large mammals such as foxes, but occasional losses to predation are inevitable. The carrion crow (Corvus corone) is locally a successful predator of common cranes' eggs, trickily using distraction displays to steal them. Other species of Corvus may also cause some loss of eggs, with common ravens (Corvus corax) also taking some small chicks. Common cranes may loosely associate with any other crane in the genus Grus in migration or winter as well as greater white-fronted geese and bean geese.

== Population and conservation ==
Common Cranes at Beijing Wildlife Park, China

In 2025, the global population was estimated to be about 500,000 individuals. The vast majority of pairs nest in Russia, Finland (30–40,000 pairs in 2009) and Sweden (c. 30,000 pairs in 2012). On the fringes of its range, it has often become rare or even been extirpated, but in several European countries this trend has been reversed and overall the European population is increasing.

In the early 20th century, it was considered rare in Poland, but gradually began to increase and this has accelerated since the 1980s. In 2010–2012, the Polish population was estimated to number 20–22,000 pairs. Norway had 3–5,000 pairs in 2015 and Estonia had 5,800 pairs in 1999, with both increasing. The German breeding population increased from 700 pairs in 1978 to more than 10,000 pairs in 2017, which is still a fraction of the size of the numbers that once bred in the country. After having disappeared as a breeding bird decades earlier, the species began breeding again in France in 2000 and in 2017 there were more than 20 pairs. In Denmark, the common crane returned as a breeder in 1953, about a century after it had disappeared. Numbers remained extremely low, less than 5 pairs, until the 1990s when a rapid increase began; in 2022 there were at least 750 pairs in Denmark. In the Netherlands, the species disappeared as a breeding bird centuries ago, but it returned in 2001 and by 2020 there were about 40 pairs in the country. The common crane returned to the Czech Republic as a breeder in 1981 and by 2004 it had increased to 35 pairs. In 2009, the species again began to breed in Slovakia, and in Austria it returned as a breeding bird in 2018 after having disappeared in 1885. Although large numbers winter in Spain, the last breeding in the country had been in 1954. In 2017, a pair that had been released after being rehabilitated bred in Spain. It was extirpated as a breeder from Italy around 1920 and Hungary by 1952, and it also used to breed in the Balkans; significant numbers still pass through these countries during migration.

In the United Kingdom, the common crane became extirpated in the 17th century, but a small and increasing population now breeds again in the Norfolk Broads and a reintroduction began in 2010 in the Somerset levels. A total of 93 birds were released between 2010 and 2014 as part of the reintroduction effort, and there are now 180 resident birds in the UK. In 2016, a wild crane was born in Wales for the first time in over 400 years. In 2021, the British population had increased to 72 pairs. In the Republic of Ireland, several visiting flocks were observed in the 2000s and in 2021 a pair managed to breed for the first time on the island in 300 years.

The main threat to the species and the primary reason for its decline comes from habitat loss and degradation, as a result of dam construction, urbanisation, agricultural expansion, and drainage of wetlands. Although it has adapted to human settlement in many areas, nest disturbance, continuing changes in land use, and collision with utility lines are still potential problems. Further threats may include persecution due to crop damage, pesticide poisoning, egg collection, and hunting. The common crane is one of the species to which the Agreement on the Conservation of African-Eurasian Migratory Waterbirds (AEWA) applies.

== Culture ==
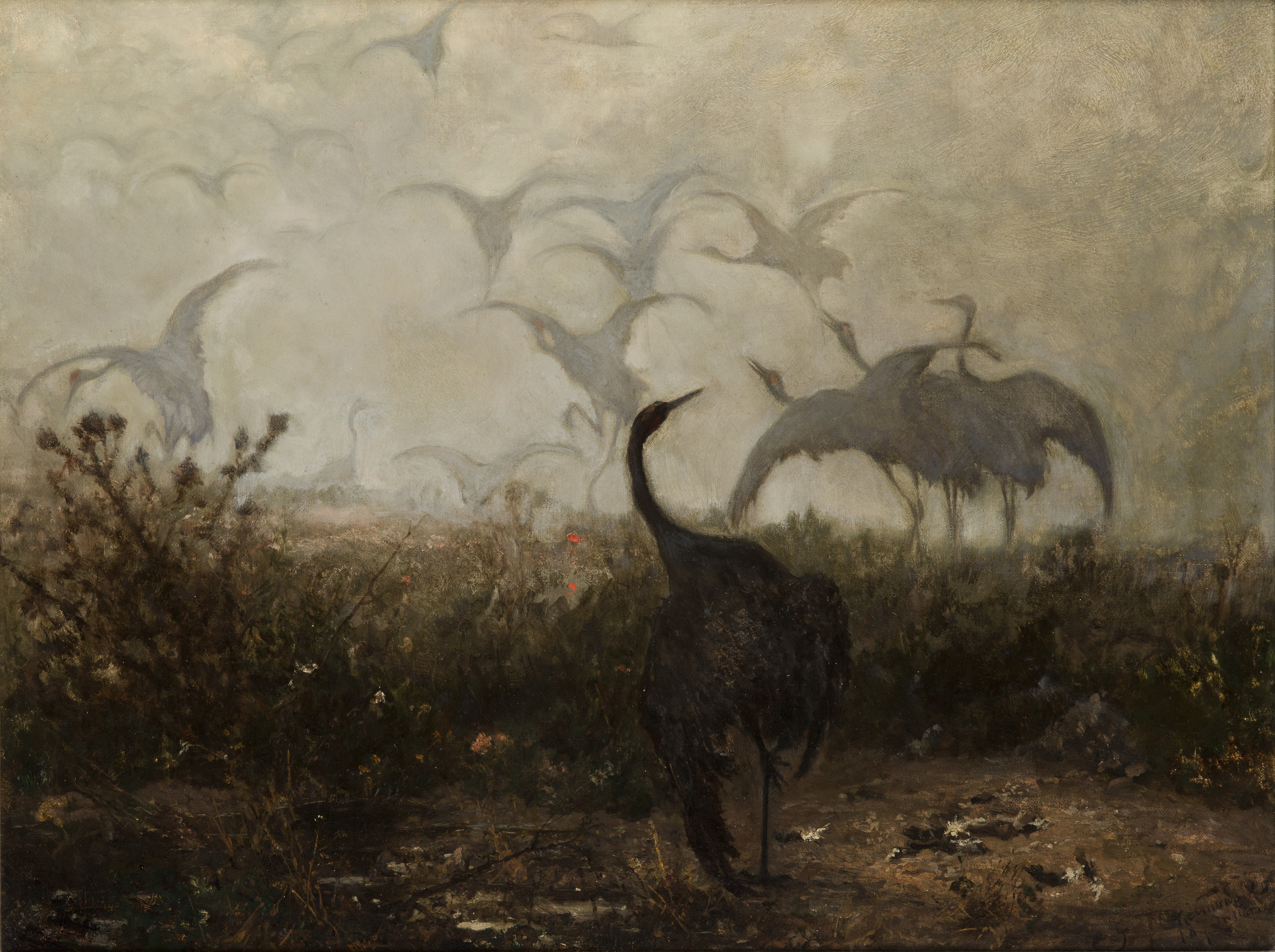
"Departure of Cranes" - picture of 1870 by Józef Chełmoński (National Museum in Kraków)

A common crane in the coat of arms in the Tervola municipality

In 1870 Józef Chełmoński painted a picture: "Departure of Cranes" (National Museum in Kraków)

In Ireland, despite being extinct for over 200 years, the common crane plays a very important part in Irish culture and folklore and thus recent efforts to encourage it back to Ireland are received with much enthusiasm.

The Kranich Museum in Hessenburg, Mecklenburg-Vorpommern, Germany, is dedicated to art and folklore related to the common crane.

The common crane is the sacred bird of the god Hephaestus, and it features heavily in the god's iconography. In Indian states of Rajsthan and Gujarat, this crane is featured in the well-known folk song Kurja, titled after the bird. In the song, a newly married woman whose husband has gone to a far away place for earning asks the crane to take a message to her husband that she wants him to come home early.

== Gallery ==
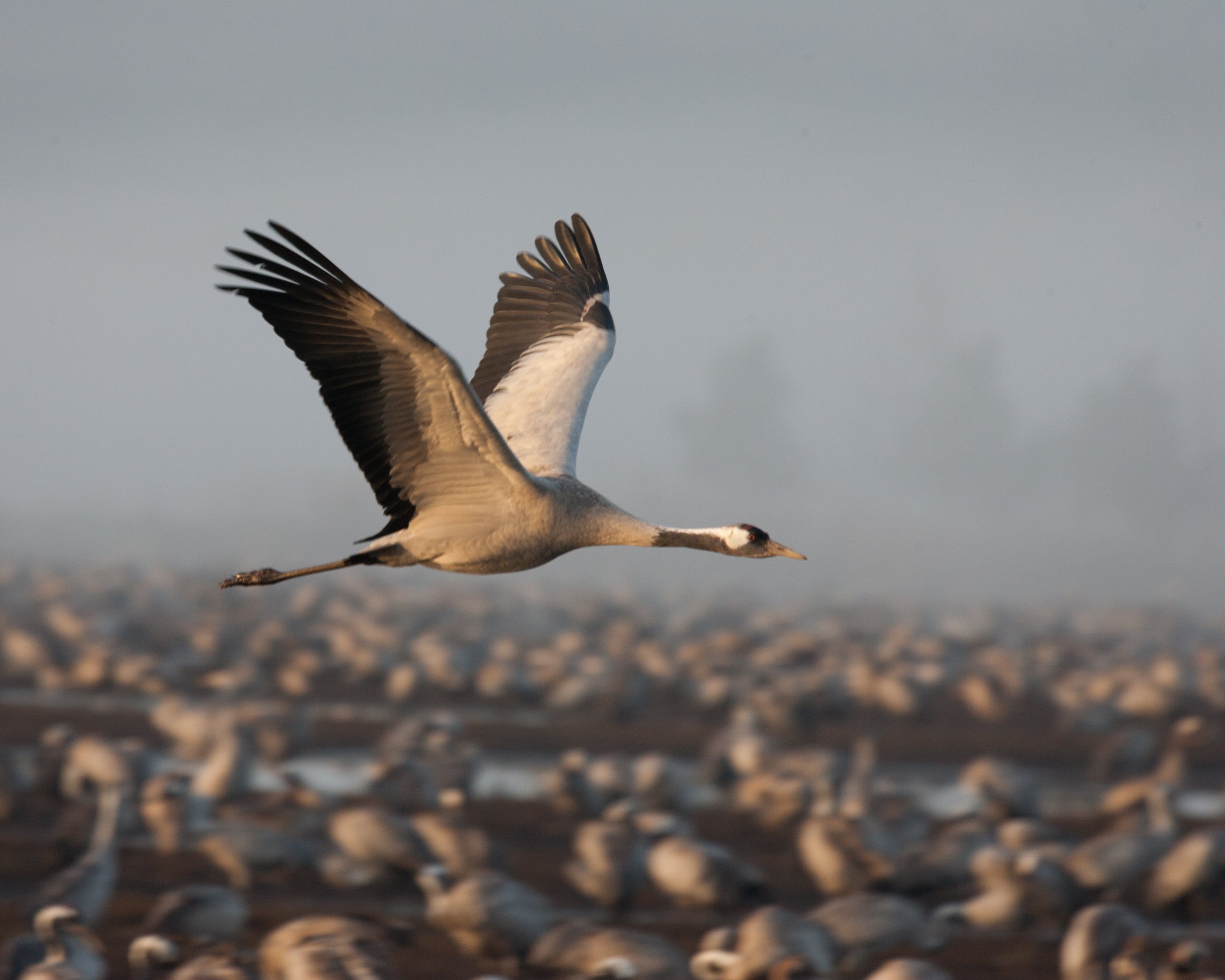
Adult in flight

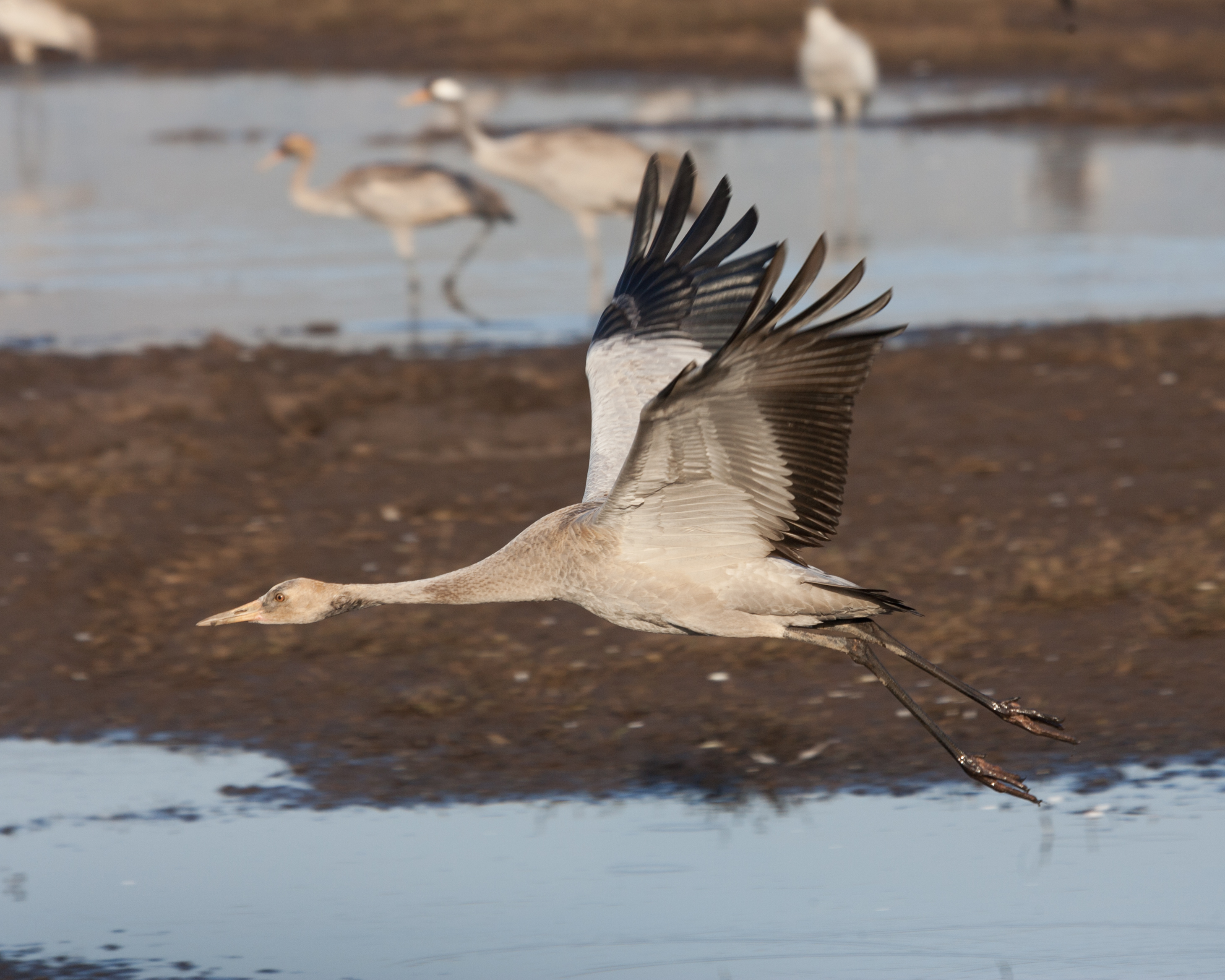
Juvenile in flight

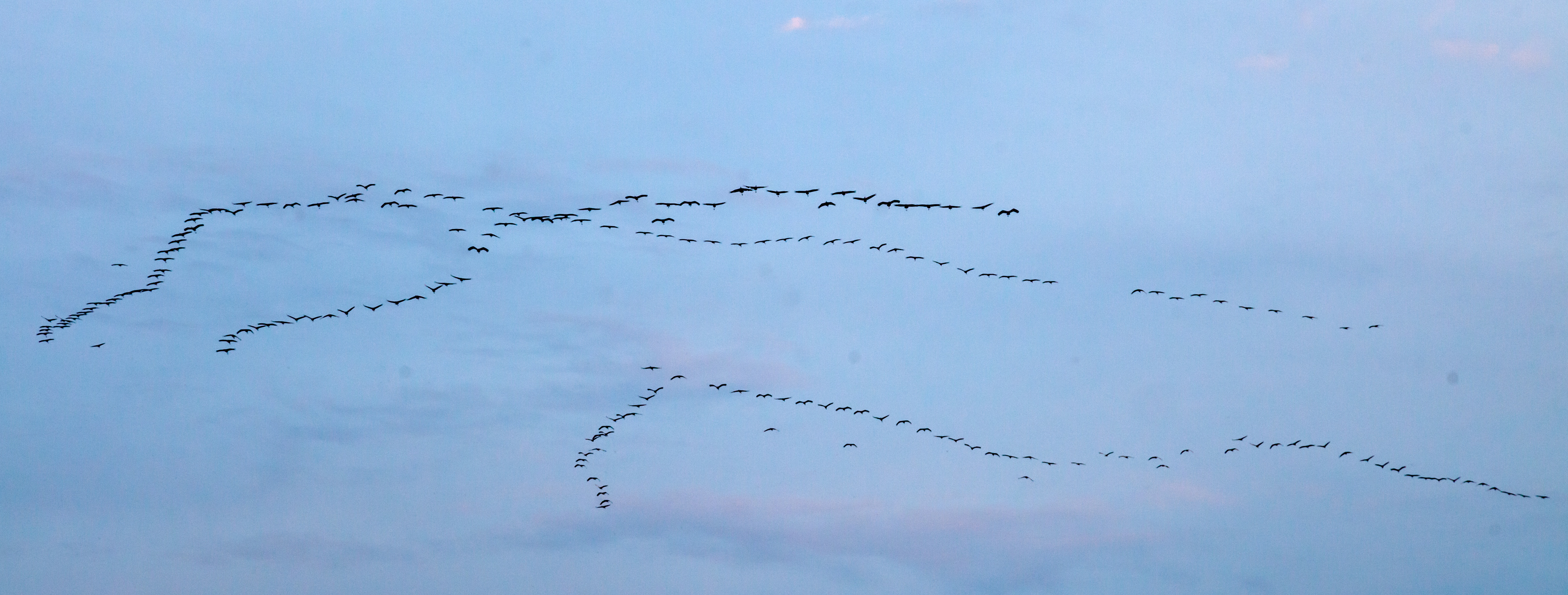
Large flock of cranes near Bobrowniki, Poland

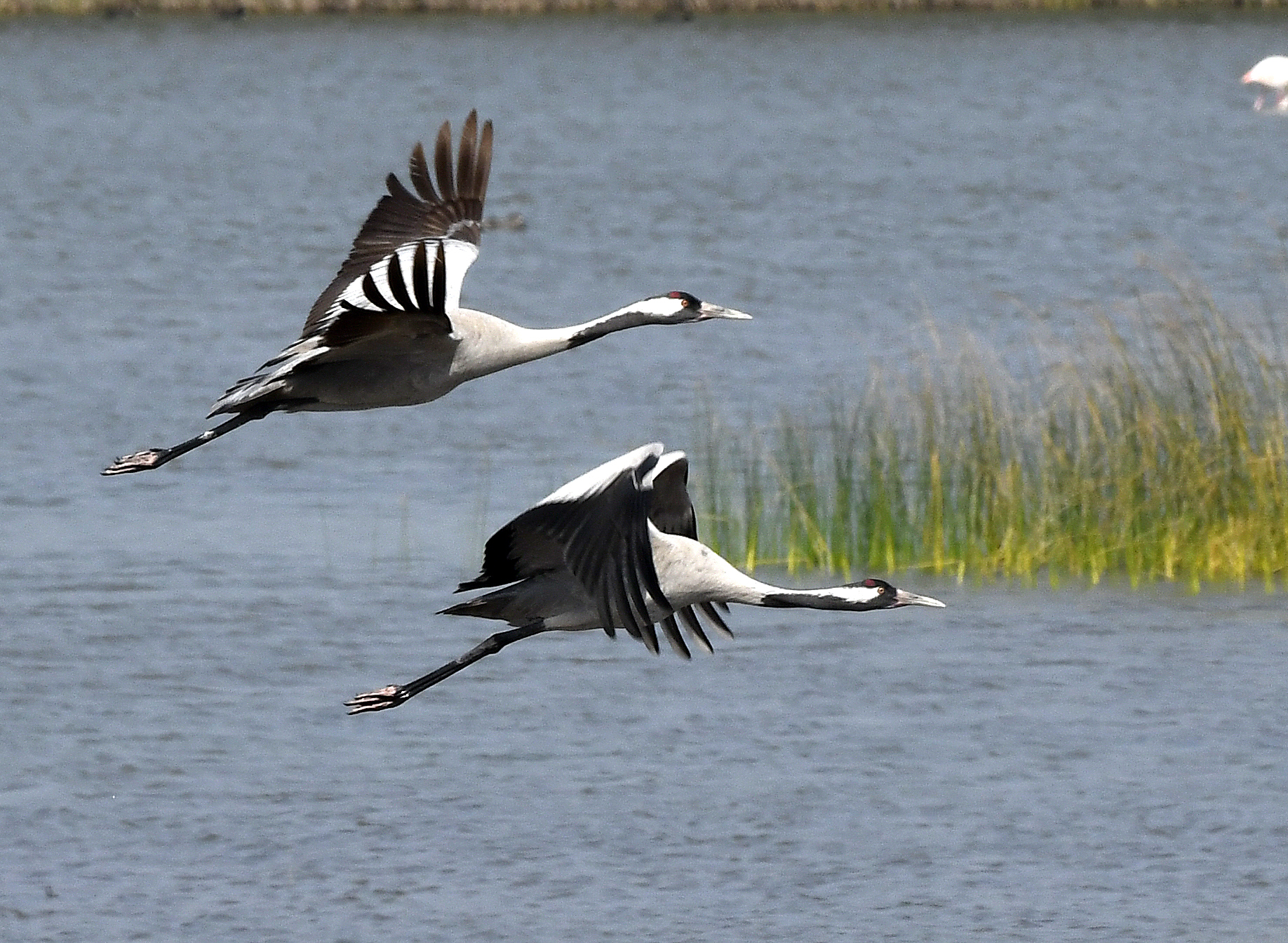
Adults in flight at Khijadiya Bird Sanctuary, Gujarat, India

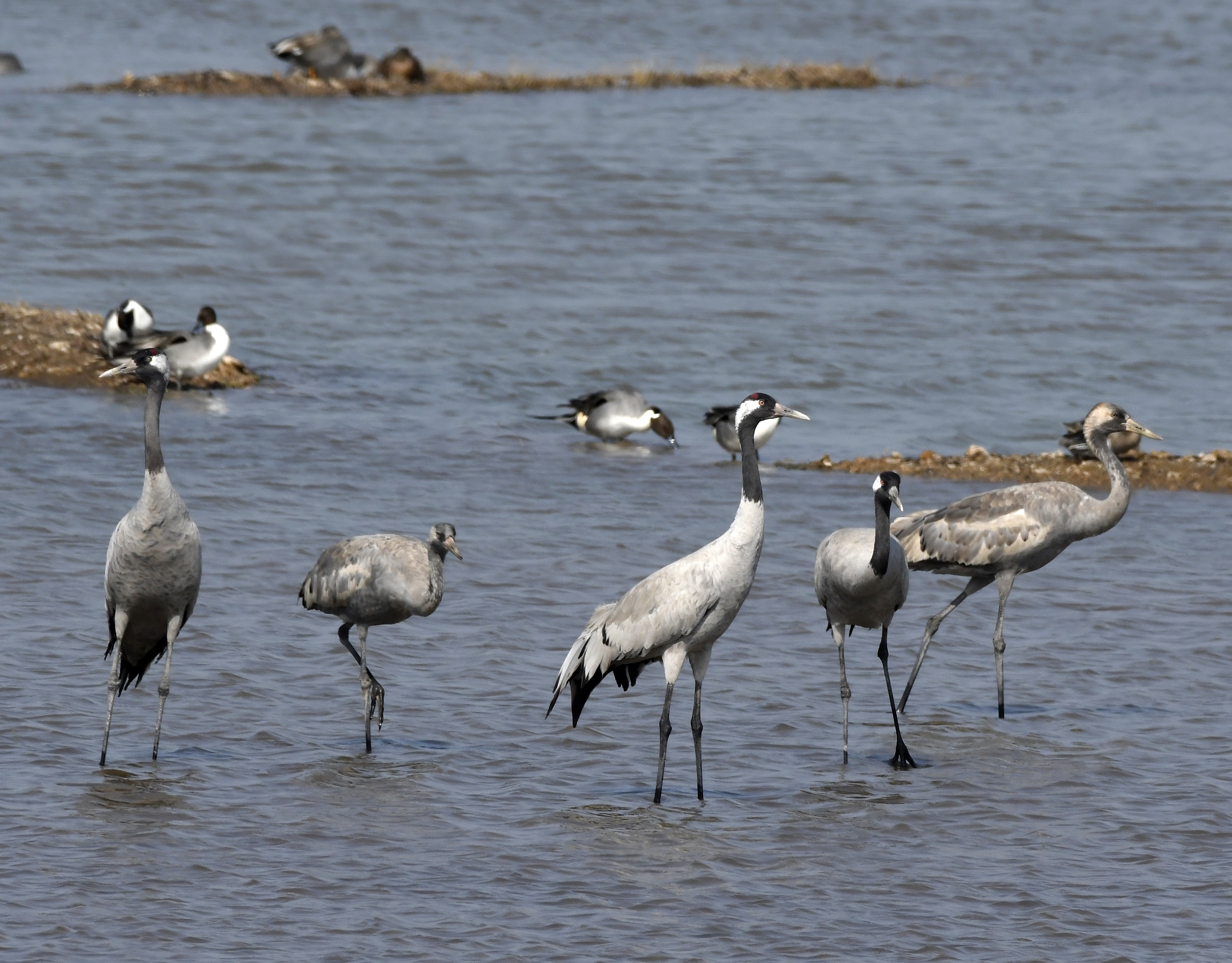
Family group - adults and immatures - at Khijadiya Bird Sanctuary, Gujarat, India

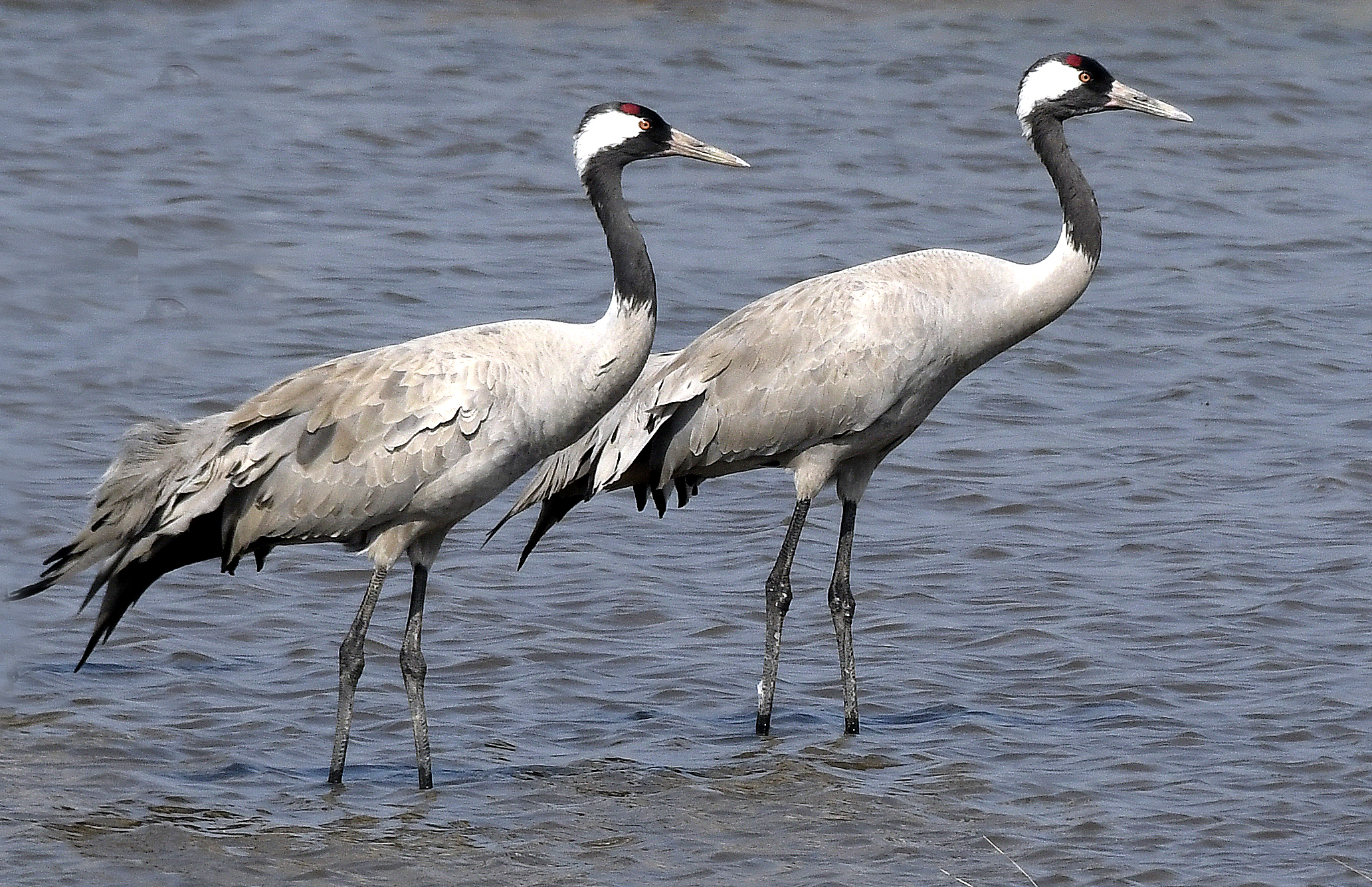
Adults at Khijadiya Bird Sanctuary, Gujarat, India

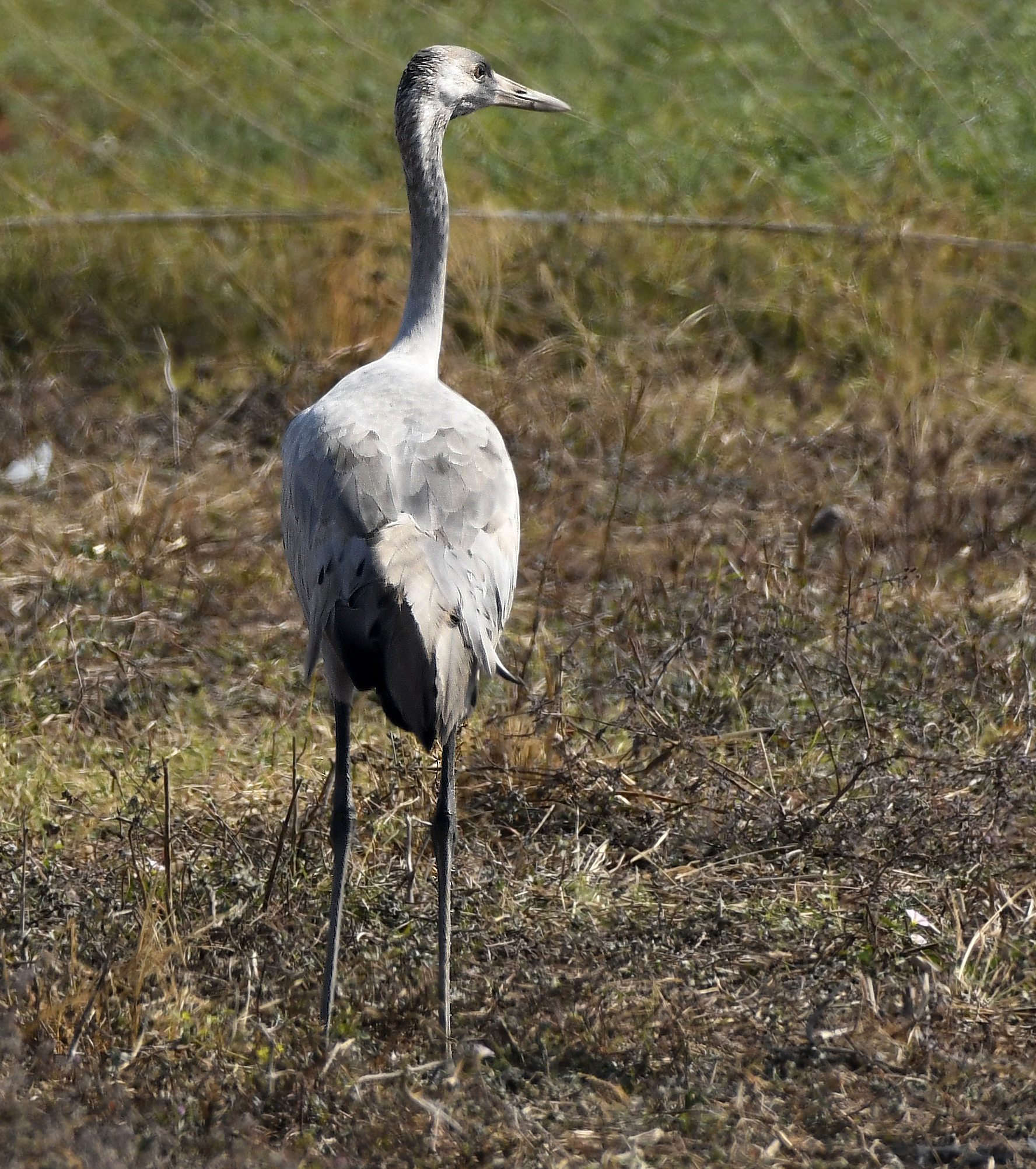
Immature at Khijadiya Bird Sanctuary, Gujarat, India

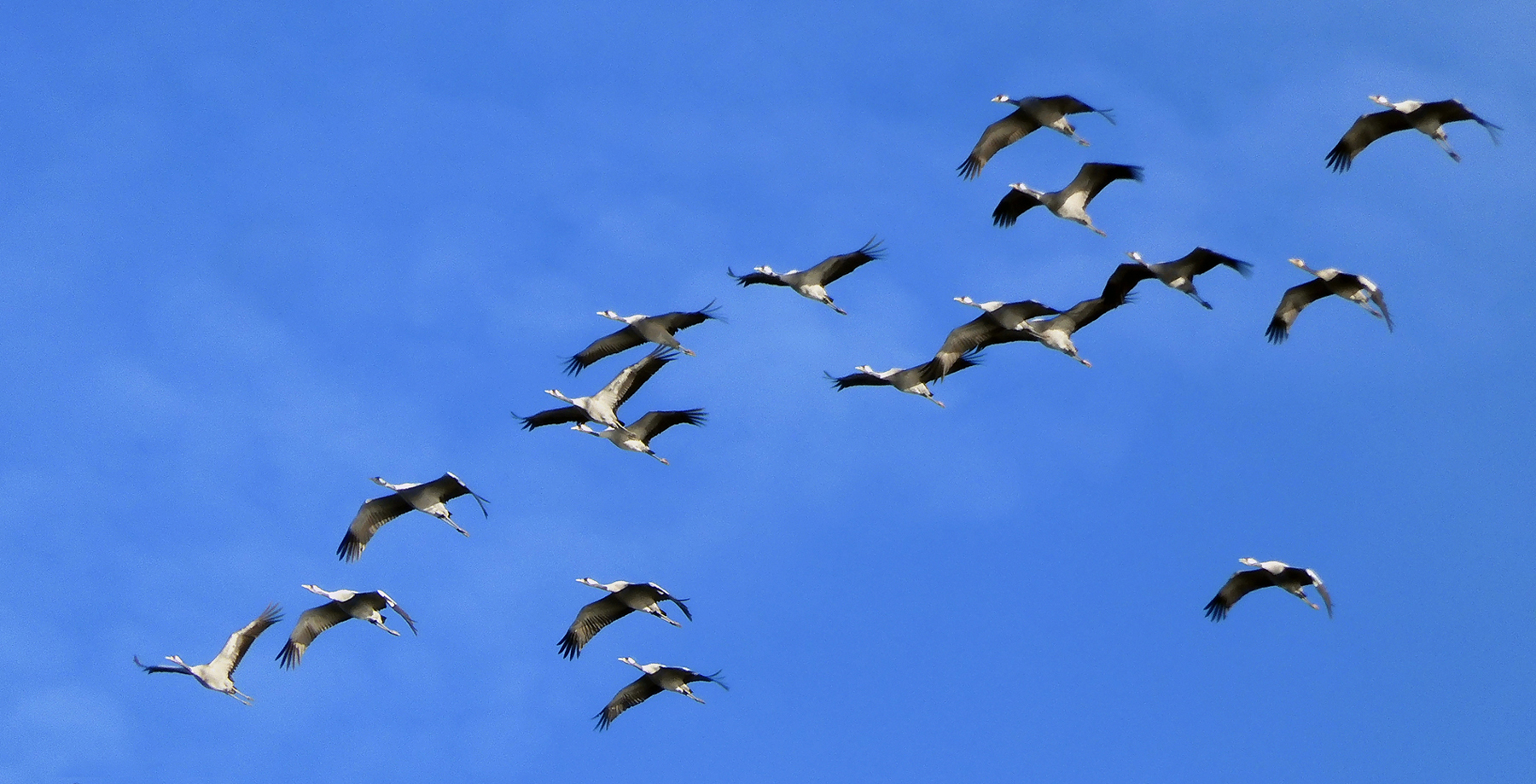
A small flock flies over Ystad.

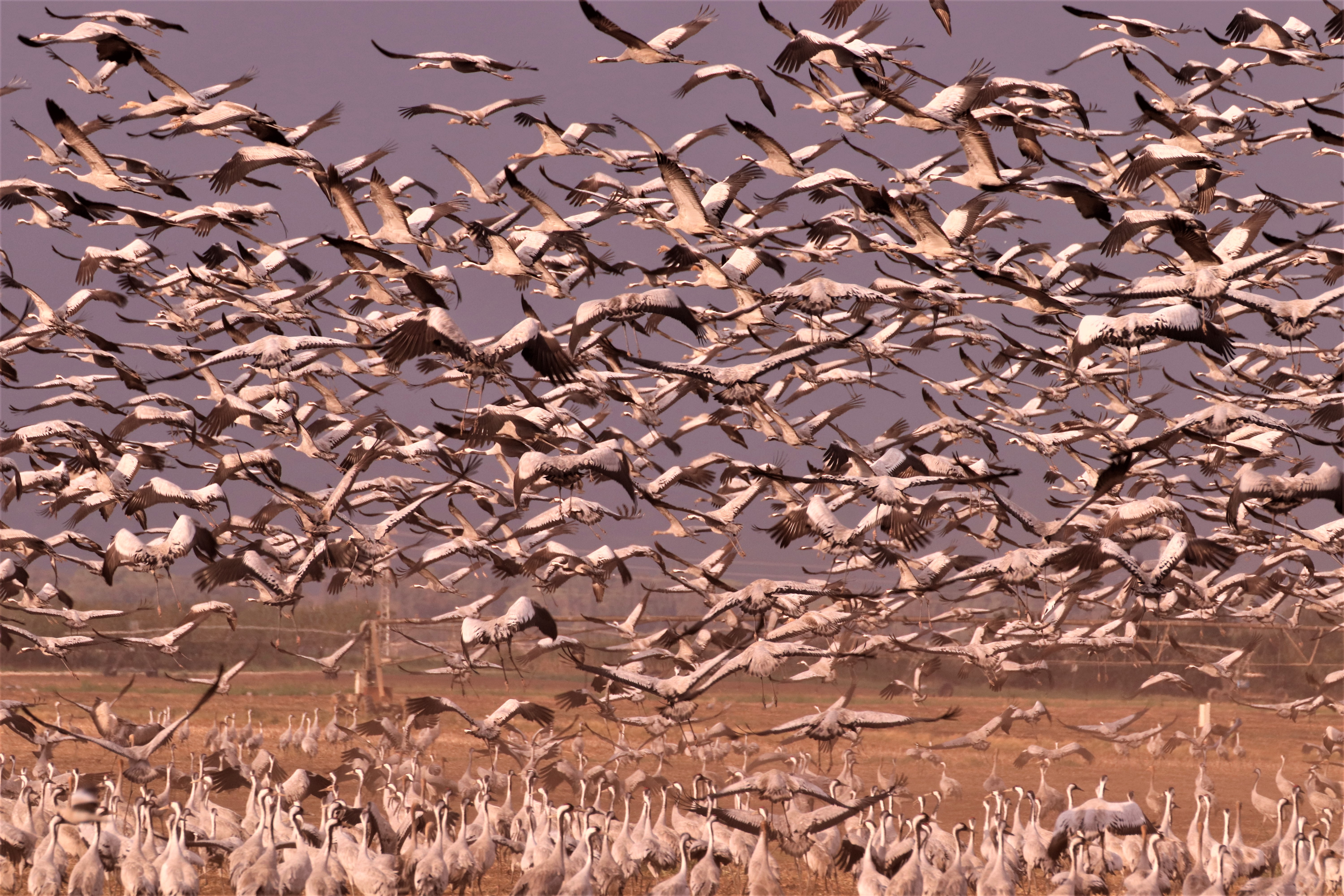
A large gathering of cranes at Hula Valley, Israel.

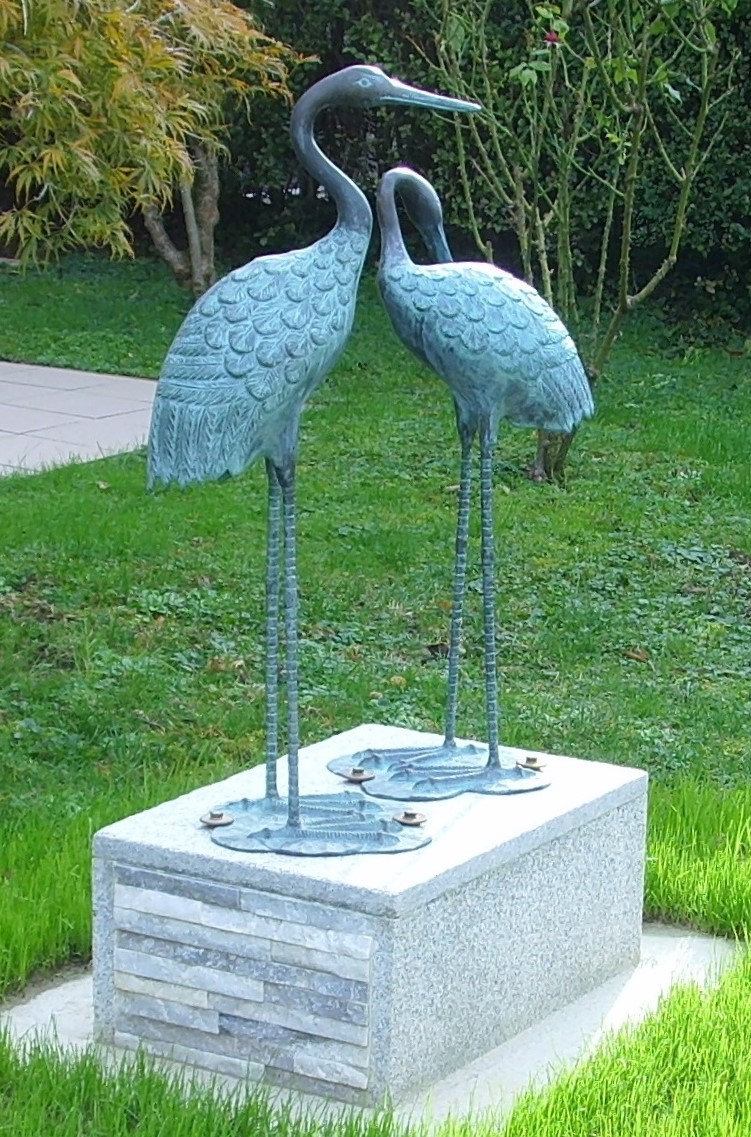
The sculpture depicts two cranes (bronze), Croatia.

== See also ==
- Cranes in Britain
- Lake Der-Chantecoq (migration stopover site)
- Hula Valley (migration stopover site)
- Lake Hornborga (migration stopover site)
