= Khijadiya Bird Sanctuary =

Bird sanctuary in Jamnagar district of Gujarat, India

- IUCN category IV (habitat/species management area)
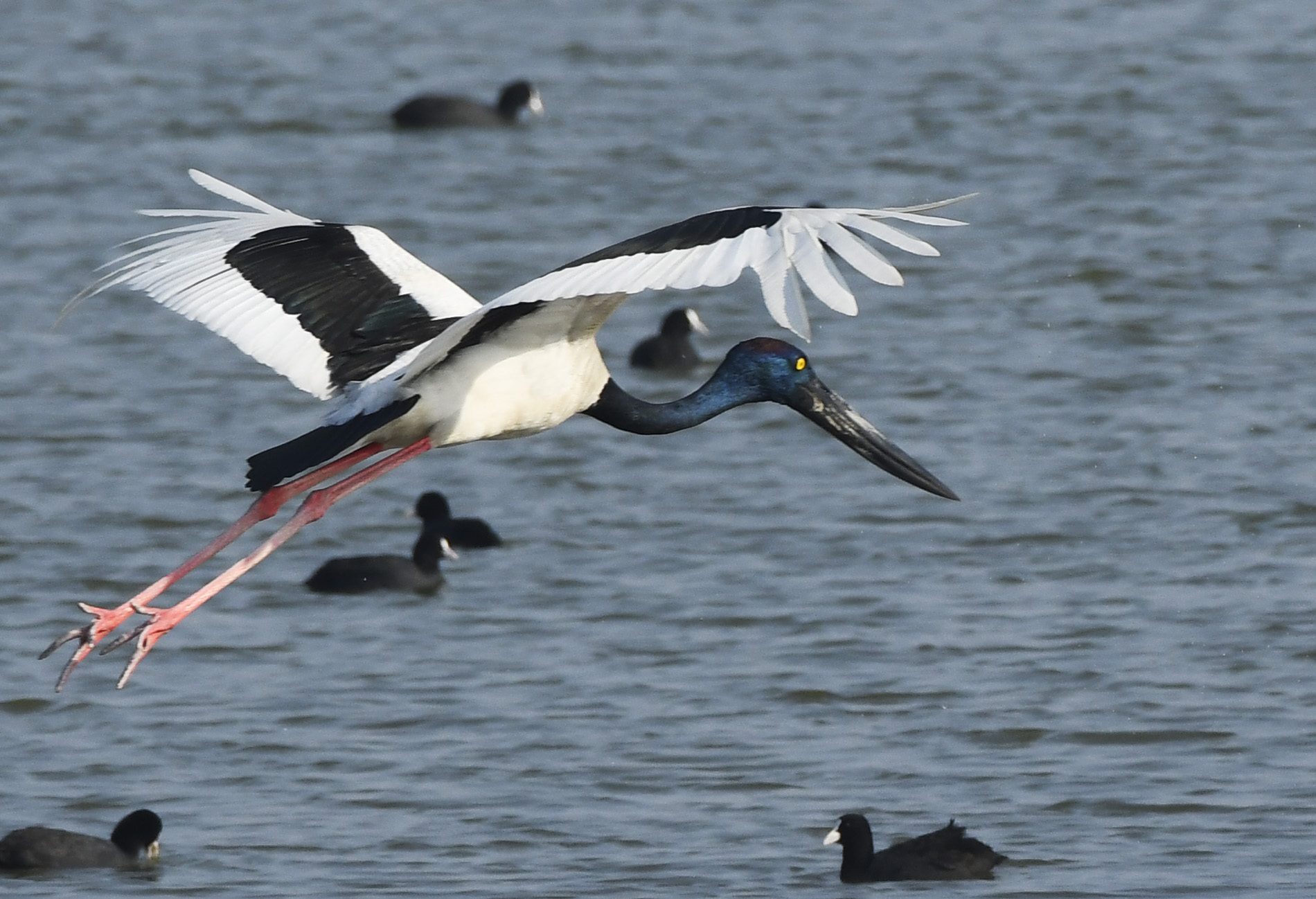
- Black-necked stork in Khijadiya

- Location within Gujarat Location within India
- Interactive map of Khijadiya Bird Sanctuary
- Location: Jamnagar district, Gujarat, India
- Nearest city: Jamnagar
- Coordinates: 22.51°N 70.14°E
- Area: 605 ha (1,490 acres)
- Established: 1982

Ramsar Wetland
- Official name: Khijadia Wildlife Sanctuary
- Designated: 13 April 2021
- Reference no.: 2464

Khijadiya Bird Sanctuary is a bird sanctuary located in Jamnagar district of Gujarat, India. About 300 species of migratory birds have been recorded here.

In 2022, on World Wetlands Day (2 February) it was declared as a Ramsar site.

== Sanctuary ==
The sanctuary is unique having both fresh water lakes, salt and freshwater marshlands. It is spread over an area of 6.05 km^{2}. Before Indian independence, a check dam was built for storing the waters of river Ruparel just before it entered the sea. Over the years with fresh water of the rain and river on one side and salt water of the sea on the other side, a unique area was formed here. On the other side of the bund large creeks flowing from the Gulf of Kutch are located. These creeks support mangroves and other marine vegetation while on land side of the sanctuary inland vegetation like babul, Pilu, Prosopis and others are found profusely. The sanctuary is located at the watershed of Ruparel river and Kalindri at the North East coastal region of Jamnagar district in the Gulf of Kutch and has a very special and unique ecosystem. Further, as sanctuary is located near Narara Island, and has a bio-diversified coral reef.

== Location ==
It is located about 12 km away from Jamnagar. The nearest airport is at Jamnagar having daily direct flight to Mumbai. It was declared as a Sanctuary on 6 November 1982. It is the biggest bird sanctuary in Gujarat. Buses and taxis are available for going to sanctuary, form where in you have to walk about 3 km to reach inside the sanctuary. It is divided into 2 major parts: Part 1 and Part 2 mainly dividing salt waters and fresh waters.

== Birds ==
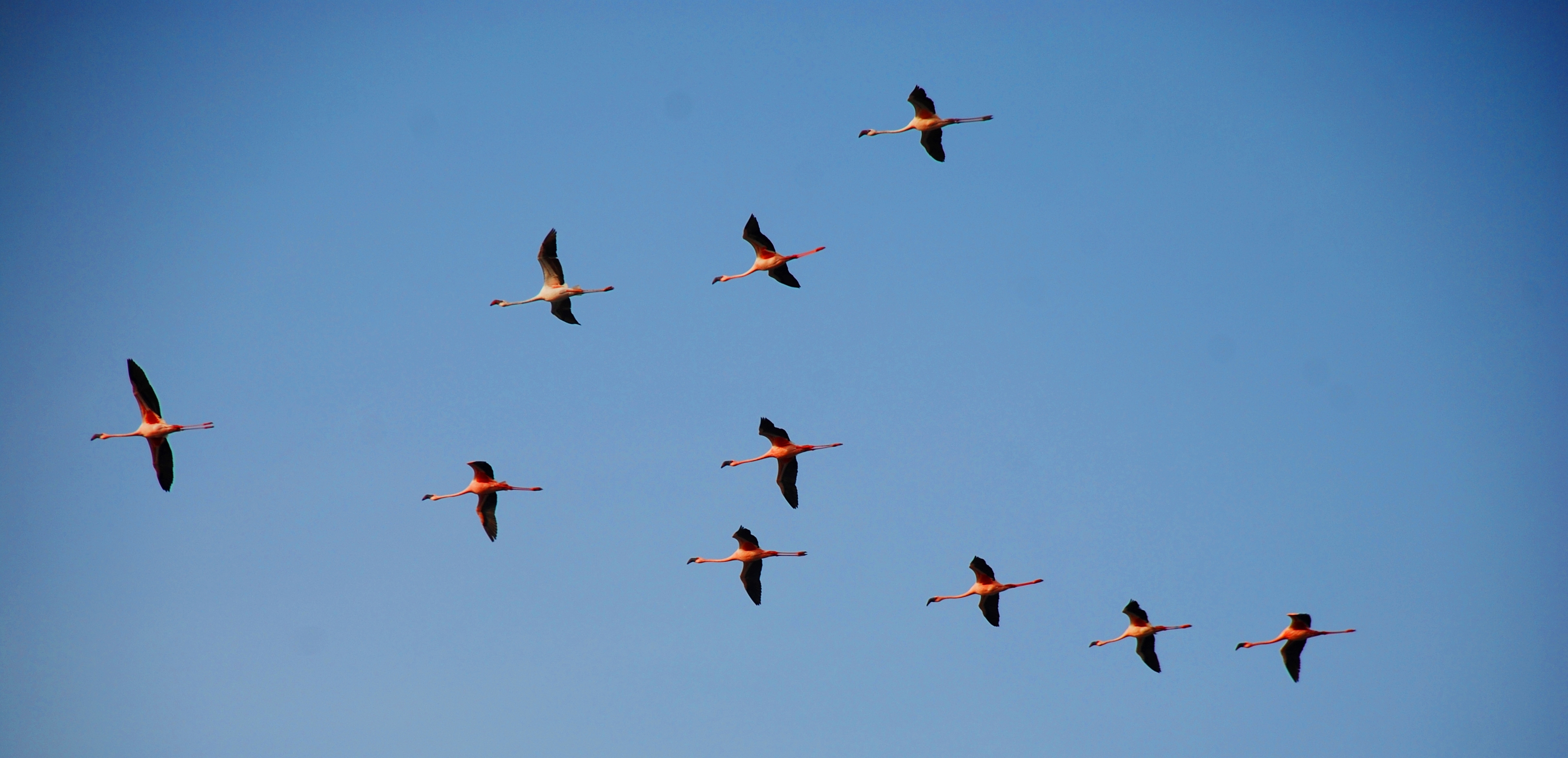
Flying pattern of lesser flamingos

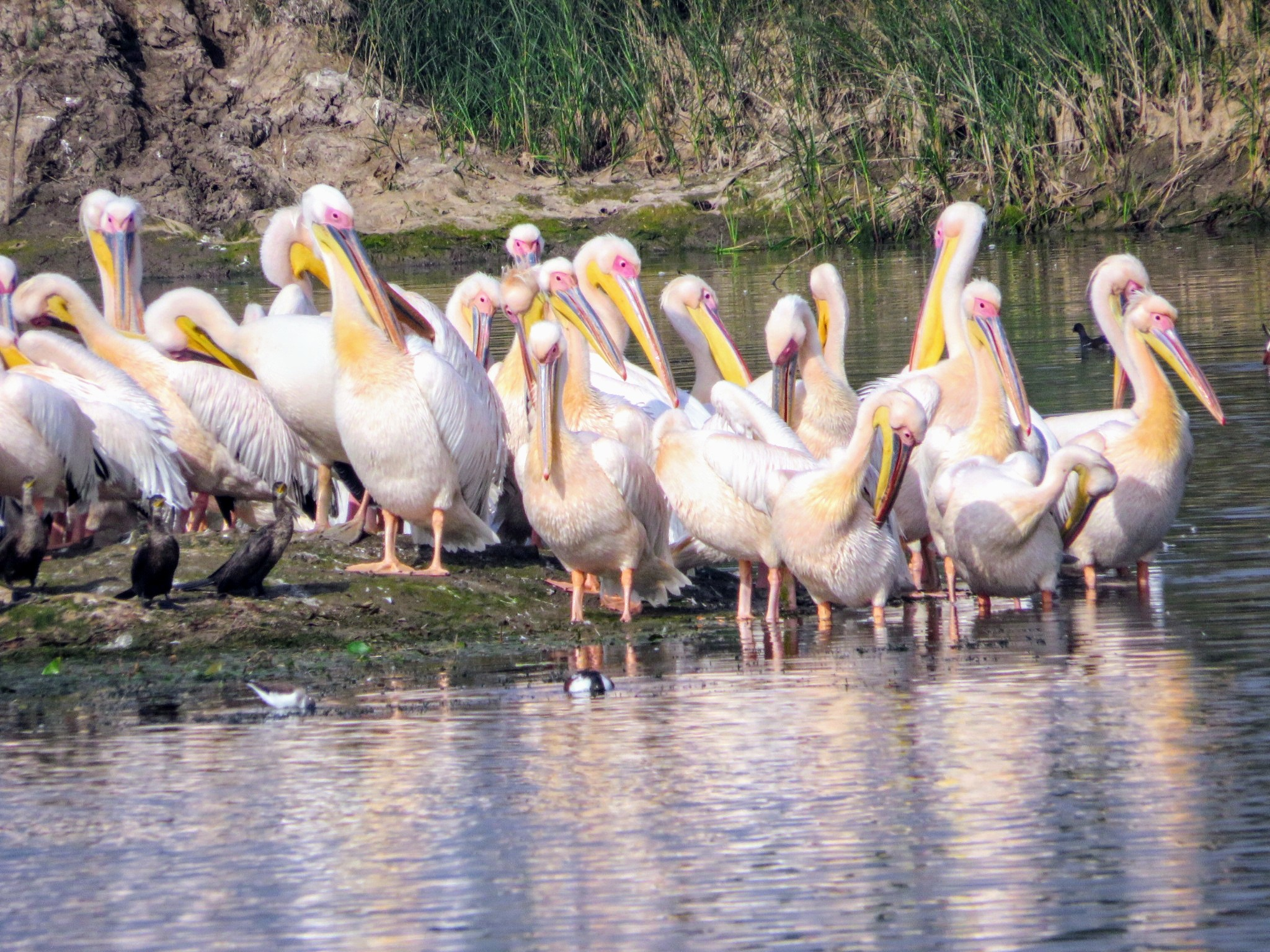
Great white pelicans preening

One can find both sea and shore birds, Every year over a hundreds of migratory birds species visit here to feed. In winter the sanctuary has both migratory and resident birds like the Grey hypocolius, Forest wagtail, Grey-necked bunting, Black-headed bunting, Greylag goose, European roller, black-necked stork, Great white pelican, Dalmatian pelican, Lesser flamingo, Greater flamingo, great crested grebe, shikra, Indian spotted eagle, black ibis, Blue-cheeked bee-eater, Barn swallow, Crested lark, Isabelline shrike, black-winged kite, brahminy kite, pheasant-tailed jacana, great thick-knee, common greenshank, grey francolin, imperial eagle, little tern, black-tailed godwit, knob-billed duck, common crane, common teal, dunlin, garganey, Gadwall, marsh harrier, northern pintail, shoveler, Whistling ducks, Eurasian wigeon, pale harrier, demoiselle, cormorants and darters. Among the other wildlife found here are blue bull, jackal, wolf, jungle cat, mongoose, Indian hare and snakes.

All the types of nests can be seen here, the ones on tree, on ground and floating nests on water. Varieties of ducks make floating nests. For instance, the black-necked storks, which are not found easily anywhere in India, are found here in abundance.

According to reports available least 257 to 300 types of migratory birds visit the Khijadiya Bird Sanctuary. The noted Indian ornithologist, Salim Ali when visited the sanctuary in 1984 and he reportedly sited 104 species on a single day.

== Tourism ==
Khijadiya was declared as India's 49th Ramsar site, a wetland of International Importance recently on February 2, 2022. This sanctuary provides habitat for over 310 bird species. People visit the sanctuary, which has now become an eco-tourist village. The birds can be seen here from September till February–March. During the winter of 2010, an International Bird Watcher's Conference was held at Khijadiya.

== See also ==
- Arid Forest Research Institute cater the forestry research needs of the Arid and semi arid region of Rajasthan, Gujarat & Dadra and Nagar Haveli & Daman-Diu.
