= Tamara Friebel =

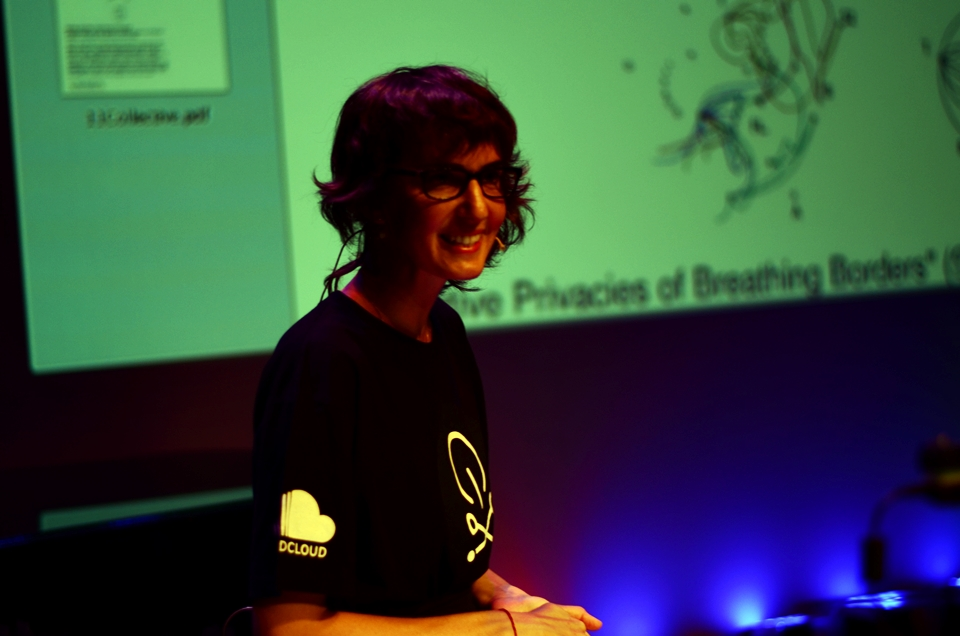
- Tamara Friebel in 2015

Background information
- Born: 1975; Cohuna, Victoria, Australia
- Website: tamarafriebel.com

Tamara Friebel (born 1975 in Cohuna, Victoria) is an Australian sound artist, composer and performance artist.

== Career ==
During her childhood, Tamara Friebel studied piano, violin, recorder, piano, and horn. Believing music wasn't important, she first studied sociology at University of Melbourne and architecture at Royal Melbourne Institute of Technology, and moved to Vienna, Austria as an exchange student.

In 2002 she took the entrance exam at the University of Music and Performing Arts in Vienna, to study composition and electroacoustics with Chaya Czernowin. She completed her studies in England at Huddersfield University, and in 2013 received her PhD in composition with a portfolio of works titled Generative Transcriptions, an opera of the self.

Since 2014 she has been a postdoctoral researcher at the Karl-Franzens University of Graz, and teaches at the University of Music and Performing Arts Graz.

In 2022 she performed her work Illuminations at the Festival Imago Dei in Austria.
