= Bharatiya Janata Party – Punjab =

Punjab affiliate of the Bharatiya Janata Party

- Abbreviation: BJP
- President: Kewal Singh Dhillon
- Founder: Atal Bihari Vajpayee; Lal Krishna Advani; Murli Manohar Joshi; Nanaji Deshmukh; K. R. Malkani; Sikandar Bakht; Vijay Kumar Malhotra; Vijaya Raje Scindia; Bhairon Singh Shekhawat; Shanta Kumar; Ram Jethmalani; Jagannathrao Joshi
- Founded: 6 April 1980 (46 years ago)
- Split from: Janata Party
- Preceded by: Bharatiya Jana Sangh (1951–1977); Janata Party (1977–1980)
- Headquarters: Amar Shaheed Dr. Syama Prasad, Mukherjee Smarak Bhawan, Dakshin Marg, Sector-37-A, Chandigarh,-160036, India
- Newspaper: Kamal Sandesh
- Youth wing: Bharatiya Janata Yuva Morcha
- Women's wing: BJP Mahila Morcha
- Labour wing: Bharatiya Mazdoor Sangh
- Peasant's wing: Bharatiya Kisan Sangh
- Ideology: Integral humanism; Conservatism; Neoliberalism; Hindu nationalism; Liberal Conservatism Faction Sikhism
- Political position: center-right to right wing
- Colours: Saffron
- ECI status: National Party
- Alliance: National Democratic Alliance
- Seats in Rajya Sabha: 6 / 7 (as of 2026)
- Seats in Lok Sabha: 0 / 13 (as of 2024)
- Seats in Punjab Legislative Assembly: 2 / 117 (as of 2022)

Election symbol
- Lotus

Party flag
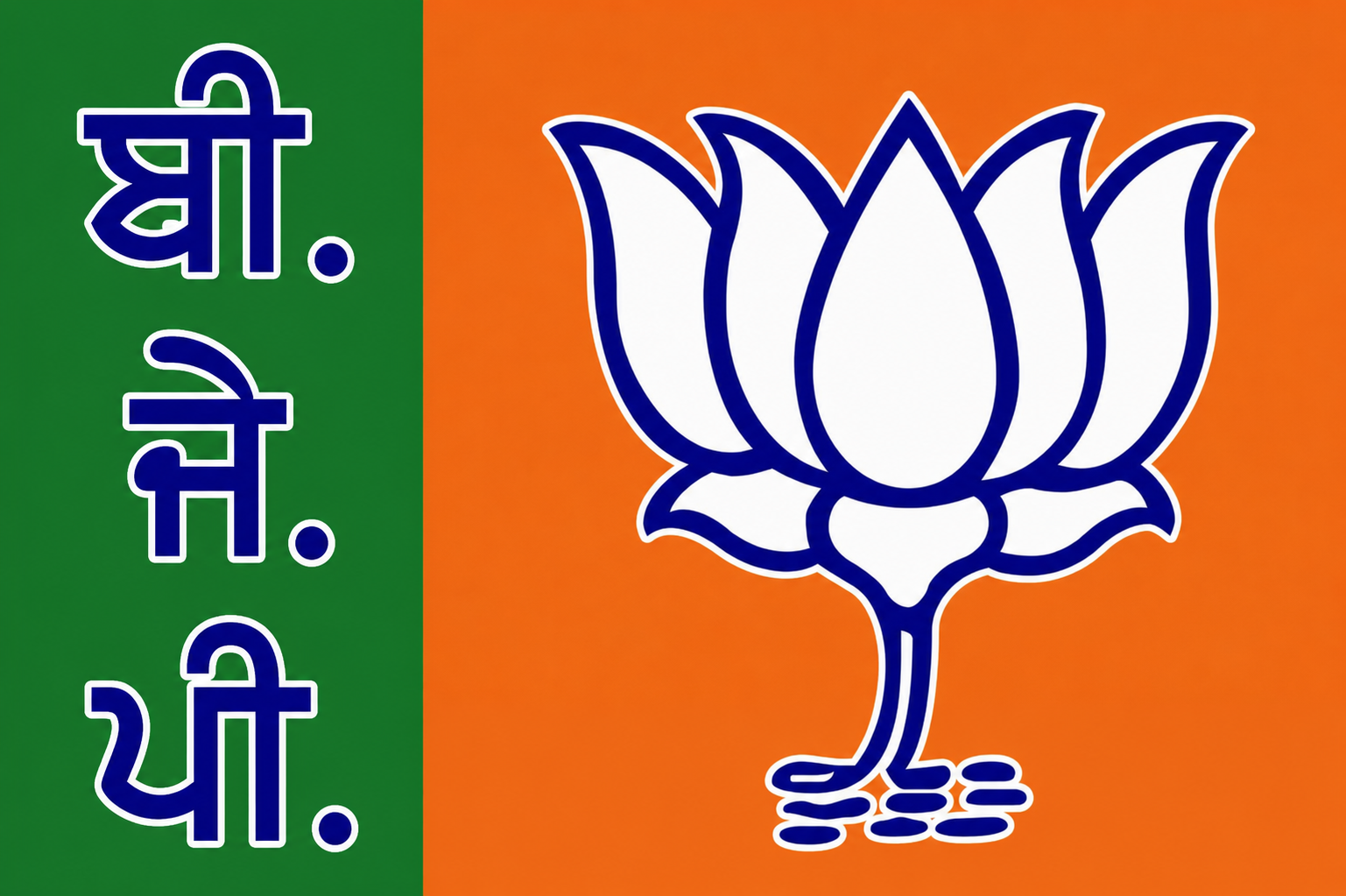
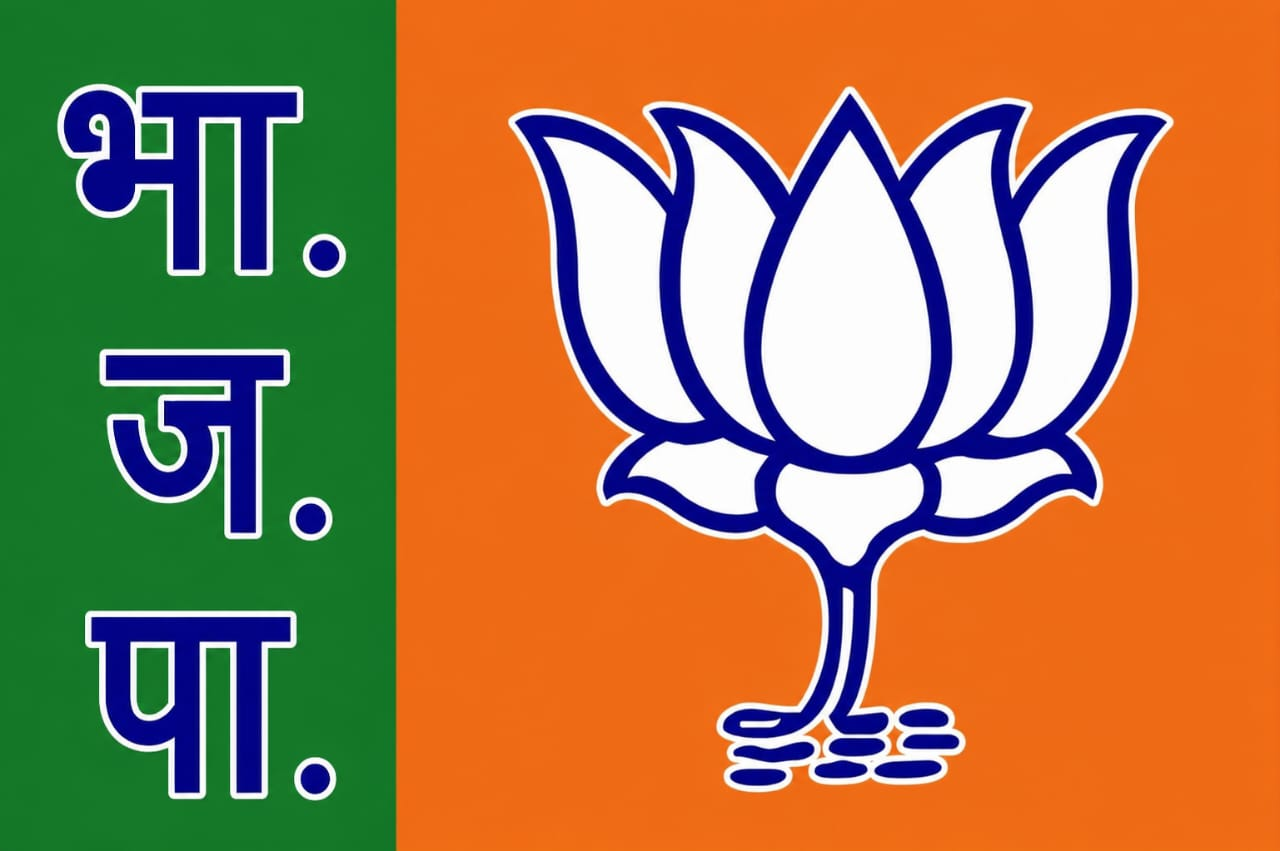

Website
- www.bjp.org/punjab

The Bharatiya Janata Party – Punjab (BJP Punjab) is the affiliate of the Bharatiya Janata Party in the Indian state of Punjab. Its head office is situated at the Amar Sahid Dr. Syama Prasad, Mukherjee Smarak Bhawan, Dakshin Marg, Sector-37-A, Chandigarh, Punjab-160036, India. The current president of BJP Punjab is Kewal Singh Dhillon .

== Electoral performance ==
=== Lok Sabha Elections in Punjab ===
Election Year	Leader	Alliance	Seats			Popular vote			Sitting side
Election Year	Leader	Alliance	seats contested	seats won	+/- in seats	Votes	votes %	±pp	Sitting side
Lok Sabha Elections Performance in Punjab
1985	Atal Bihari Vajpayee	None	3	0 / 13	New entry	3,45,316	4.77%	New entry	Opposition
1989	Lal Krishna Advani	National Front	3	0 / 13	Steady	1,61,236	4.23%	▼0.54%	Opposition
1992	Lal Krishna Advani	None	9	0 / 13	Steady	4,97,999	16.51%	▲12.28%	Opposition
1996	Atal Bihari Vajpayee	NDA	6	0 / 13	Steady	5,71,920	6.48%	▼10.03%	Opposition
1998	Atal Bihari Vajpayee	NDA	3	3 / 13	▲3	10,63,751	11.67%	▲5.19%	Government
1999	Atal Bihari Vajpayee	NDA	3	1 / 13	▼2	8,01,806	9.16%	▼2.51%	Government
2004	Lal Krishna Advani	NDA	3	3 / 13	▲2	10,71,650	10.48%	▲1.32%	Opposition
2009	Lal Krishna Advani	NDA	3	1 / 13	▼2	11,90,144	10.06%	▼0.42%	Opposition
2014	Narendra Modi	NDA	3	2 / 13	▲1	12,09,004	8.73%	▼1.33%	Government
2019	Narendra Modi	NDA	3	2 / 13	Steady	13,25,445	9.63%	▲0.90%	Government
2024	Narendra Modi	None	13	0 / 13	▼2	25,00,877	18.56%	▲8.93%	Government

==== Elected Members to Lok Sabha election in Punjab ====
Lok Sabha Members in Punjab
S.No.	Portrait	Name	Election Years	Constituency		Popular Votes				Prime Minister
S.No.	Portrait	Name	Election Years	No.	Name	Votes	Vote %	Margin	Margin %	Prime Minister
2019 Lok Sabha Members in Punjab
01.		Sunny Deol (br.19 October 1957)	2019	1	Gurdaspur	5,58,719	50.58%	82,459	7.46%	Narendra Modi
02.		Som Parkash (br.3 April 1949)	2019	5	Hoshiarpur	4,21,320	42.49%	48,530	4.90%	Narendra Modi
2014 Lok Sabha Members in Punjab
01.		Vinod Khanna (br.6 October 1946 - di.27 April 2017)	2014	1	Gurdaspur	4,82,255	46.25%	1,36,065	13.05%	Narendra Modi
02.		Vijay Sampla (br.6 July 1961)	2014	5	Hoshiarpur	3,46,643	36.05%	13,582	1.41%	Narendra Modi
2009 Lok Sabha Members in Punjab
01.		Navjot Singh Sidhu (br.20 October 1963)	2009	2	Amritsar	3,92,046	48.13%	6,858	0.84%	Opposition
2004 Lok Sabha Members in Punjab
01.		Vinod Khanna (br.6 October 1946 - di.27 April 2017)	2004	1	Gurdaspur	3,87,612	49.32%	24,983	3.18%	Opposition
02.		Navjot Singh Sidhu (br.20 October 1963)	2004	2	Amritsar	3,94,223	55.38%	1,09,532	15.39%	Opposition
03.		Avinash Rai Khanna (br.30 December 1960)	2004	6	Hoshiarpur	2,89,815	44.20%	1,04,371	15.92%	Opposition
1999 Lok Sabha Members in Punjab
01.		Vinod Khanna (br.6 October 1946 - di.27 April 2017)	1999	1	Gurdaspur	3,15,267	47.01%	1,399	0.21%	Atal Bihari Vajpayee
1998 Lok Sabha Members in Punjab
01.		Vinod Khanna (br.6 October 1946 - di.27 April 2017)	1998	1	Gurdaspur	3,98,527	56.6%	1,06,833	15.2%	Atal Bihari Vajpayee
02.		Daya Singh Sodhi (br.1 February 1925 - di.15 July 2011)	1998	2	Amritsar	3,61,133	56.1%	91,140	14.1%	Atal Bihari Vajpayee
03.		Kamal Chaudhry (br.3 July 1947 - di.25 June 2024)	1998	6	Hoshiarpur	3,04,091	51.5%	65,332	11.1%	Atal Bihari Vajpayee

=== Legislative Assembly Elections in Punjab ===
Election Year	Leader	Alliance	Seats			Popular vote			Result
Election Year	Leader	Alliance	seats contested	seats won	+/- in seats	Votes	votes %	±pp	Result
Legislative Assembly Elections Performance in Punjab
1980	None	None	41	1 / 117	New entry	4,05,106	6.48%	New entry	Opposition
1985	Krishan Lal Sharma	None	26	6 / 117	▲5	3,45,560	4.99%	▼1.49%	Opposition
1992	Madan Mohan Mittal	None	66	6 / 117	Steady	4,95,161	16.48%	▲11.49%	Opposition
1997	Balram Das Tandon	NDA	22	18 / 117	▲12	8,57,219	8.33%	▼8.15%	Government (Alliance with SAD)
2002	Brij Lal Rinwa	NDA	23	3 / 117	▼15	5,83,214	5.67%	▼2.66%	Opposition
2007	Avinash Rai Khanna	NDA	23	19 / 117	▲16	10,46,451	8.28%	▲2.61%	Government (Alliance with SAD)
2012	Ashwani Kumar Sharma	NDA	23	12 / 117	▼7	9,98,098	7.18%	▼1.10%	Government (Alliance with SAD)
2017	Vijay Sampla	NDA	23	3 / 117	▼9	8,33,092	5.40%	▼1.78%	Opposition
2022	Ashwani Kumar Sharma	NDA	73	2 / 117	▼1	1,027,143	6.60%	▲1.20%	Opposition

==== Elected Members to Legislative Assembly election in Punjab ====
Legislative Assembly Members in Punjab
S.No.	Portrait	Name	Election Years	Constituency			Popular Votes			
S.No.	Portrait	Name	Election Years	District	No.	Name	Votes	Vote %	Margin	Margin %
2022 Punjab Legislative Assembly Members
01.		Ashwani Kumar Sharma (br.23 January 1964)	2022	Pathankot	3	Pathankot	43,132	38.01%	7,759	6.84%
02.		Jangi Lal Mahajan	2022	Hoshiarpur	39	Mukerian	41,044	28.64%	2,691	1.88%
2017 Punjab Legislative Assembly Members
01.		Dinesh Singh (br.17 June 1962)	2017	Gurdaspur	1	Sujanpur	48,910	39.33%	18,701	15.04%
02.		Som Parkash (br.3 April 1949)	2017	Kapurthala	29	Phagwara (SC)	45,479	35.32%	2,009	1.56%
03.		Arun Narang	2017	Fazilka	81	Abohar	55,091	44.46%	3,279	2.65%
2012 Punjab Legislative Assembly Members
01.		Dinesh Singh (br.17 June 1962)	2012	Gurdaspur	1	Sujanpur	50,408	45.42%	23,096	20.81%
02.			2012							
03.			2012							
04.			2012							
05.			2012							
06.			2012							
07.			2012							
08.			2012							
09.			2012							
10.			2012							
11.			2012							
12.			2012							

=== Local elections ===
==== Municipal Corporation ====
Year	Municipal Corporation	Seats Won	Change in Seats	Status
Amritsar district
2012	Amritsar Municipal Corporation	24 / 65	▲4	Government (in alliance with SAD)
2017	Amritsar Municipal Corporation	5 / 85	▼19	Opposition
2024	Amritsar Municipal Corporation	9 / 85	▲4	Opposition
Barnala district
2026	Barnala Municipal Corporation	7 / 50	New entry	Opposition
Bathinda district
2015	Bathinda Municipal Corporation	8 / 50	New entry	Government (in alliance with SAD)
2021	Bathinda Municipal Corporation	0 / 50	▼8	Others
2026	Bathinda Municipal Corporation	1 / 50	▲1	Opposition
Fazilka district
2015	Abohar Municipal Corporation	11 / 33	New entry	Government (in alliance with SAD)
2021	Abohar Municipal Corporation	0 / 50	▼11	Others
2026	Abohar Municipal Corporation	28 / 50	▲28	Government
Gurdaspur district
2021	Batala Municipal Corporation	4 / 50	New entry	Opposition
2026	Batala Municipal Corporation	2 / 50	▼2	Opposition
Hoshiarpur district
2015	Hoshiarpur Municipal Corporation	17 / 33	New entry	Government (in alliance with SAD)
2021	Hoshiarpur Municipal Corporation	4 / 50	▼13	Opposition
Jalandhar district
2017	Jalandhar Municipal Corporation	8 / 85		Opposition
2024	Jalandhar Municipal Corporation	20 / 85	▲12	Opposition
Kapurthala district
2021	Kapurthala Municipal Corporation	0 / 50	Steady	Others
2026	Kapurthala Municipal Corporation	3 / 50	▲3	Opposition
Ludhiana district
2012	Ludhiana Municipal Corporation	12 / 75	Steady	Government (in alliance with SAD)
2017	Ludhiana Municipal Corporation	10 / 95	▼2	Opposition
2024	Ludhiana Municipal Corporation	19 / 95	▲9	Opposition
Moga district
2015	Moga Municipal Corporation	8 / 50	New entry	Government (in alliance with SAD)
2021	Moga Municipal Corporation	1 / 50	▼7	Opposition
2026	Moga Municipal Corporation	3 / 50	▲2	Opposition
Pathankot district
2015	Pathankot Municipal Corporation	29 / 50	New entry	Government
2021	Pathankot Municipal Corporation	11 / 50	▼18	Opposition
2026	Pathankot Municipal Corporation	22 / 50	▲11	Government
Patiala district
2002	Patiala Municipal Corporation	0 / 50	New entry	Others
2007	Patiala Municipal Corporation	9 / 50	▲9	Government (in alliance with SAD)
2012	Patiala Municipal Corporation	1 / 50	▼8	Government (in alliance with SAD)
2017	Patiala Municipal Corporation	0 / 60	▼1	Others
2024	Patiala Municipal Corporation	4 / 60	▲4	Opposition
Sahibzada Ajit Singh Nagar district
2015	Mohali Municipal Corporation	6 / 50	New entry	Government (in alliance with SAD)
2021	Mohali Municipal Corporation	0 / 50	▼6	Others
2026	Mohali Municipal Corporation	3 / 50	▲3	Opposition

== Leadership ==
=== List of Rajya Sabha members MPs from Punjab ===
S.No.	Portrait	Name	Constituency	Party	Term in office		
S.No.	Portrait	Name	Constituency	Party	Assumed office	Left office	Time in office
List of current Rajya Sabha MPs from Punjab 2022-2028
1.		Vikramjit Singh Sahney	Punjab	BJP	05-Jul-2022	04-Jul-2028	6 years, 0 days
2.	Ashok Mittal	Ashok Mittal	Punjab	BJP	10-Apr-2022	09-Apr-2028	6 years, 0 days
3.		Raghav Chadha	Punjab	BJP	10-Apr-2022	09-Apr-2028	6 years, 0 days
4.		Sandeep Pathak	Punjab	BJP	10-Apr-2022	09-Apr-2028	6 years, 0 days
5.		Harbhajan Singh	Punjab	BJP	10-Apr-2022	09-Apr-2028	6 years, 0 days
6.		Rajinder Gupta	Punjab	BJP	24-Oct-2025	09-Apr-2028	2 years, 255 days
List of Rajya Sabha MPs from Punjab 2022-1998
1.		Shwait Malik	Punjab	BJP	10-Apr-2016	09-Apr-2022	5 years, 364 days
2.		Avinash Rai Khanna	Punjab	BJP	10-Apr-2010	09-Apr-2016	5 years, 365 days
3.		Gurcharan Kaur	Punjab	BJP	07-Jun-2001	04-Jul-2004	3 years, 27 days
4.		Lajpat Rai	Punjab	BJP	10-Apr-1998	09-Apr-2004	5 years, 365 days

=== List of State Presidents of Bharatiya Janata Party – Punjab ===
S.No.	Portrait	Name (born /death)	Term in office		
S.No.	Portrait	Name (born /death)	Assumed office	Left office	Time in office
President Bharatiya Janata Party – Punjab
1.		Baldev Prakash (Born 3 February 1908 - di. 1992 )	6-April-1980	1988	8 years
2.		Babu Hitabhilashi Ji	August 1988	19 September 1988	1.5 month
3.		Madan Mohan Mittal (Born 17 March 1939)	1988	1995	7 years
4.		Balram Das Tandon (1 November 1927 – 14 August 2018)	1995	1997	2 years
5.		Manoranjan Kalia (Born 9 December 1958)	Feb 1997	Oct 1997	9 months
6.		Daya Singh Sodhi (1 February 1925 – 15 July 2011))	Oct 1997	2001	4 years
7.		Brij Lal Rinwa	2001	27-Sep-2003	2 years
8.		Avinash Rai Khanna (Born 30 December 1960)	27-Sep-2003	21-Apr-2007	3 years, 206 days
9.		Rajinder Bhandari	21-Apr-2007	4-Feb-2010	2 years, 289 days
10.	Ashwani Kumar Sharma (BJP_Punjab politician)	Ashwani Kumar Sharma (Born 23 January 1964)	4-Feb-2010	15-Jan-2013	2 years, 346 days
10.	Ashwani Kumar Sharma (BJP_Punjab politician)	Ashwani Kumar Sharma (Born 23 January 1964)	17-Jan-2020	4-Jul-2023	3 years, 168 days
11.		Kamal Sharma (17 March 1970 – 27 October 2019)	15-Jan-2013	8-Apr-2016	3 years, 84 days
12.		Vijay Sampla (Born 6 July 1961 )	8-Apr-2016	6-Apr-2018	1 year, 363 days
13.		Shwait Malik (Born 29 April 1963)	6-Apr-2018	17-Jan-2020	1 year, 286 days
14.		Sunil Kumar Jakhar (br. 9 February 1954 )	5-Jul-2023	27-May-2026	2 years, 326 days
15.		Kewal Singh Dhillon (br. 16 May 1950)	28-May-2026	Present	137 days

== See also ==
- Bharatiya Janata Party
- National Democratic Alliance
- Rashtriya Sikh Sangat
- Shiromani Akali Dal
