= 2026 Punjab, India local elections =

State elections in India

2026 Punjab municipal elections
- 26 May 2026

2,019 wards across 105 urban local bodies

	Majority party	Minority party	Third party
Leader	Bhagwant Mann	Amrinder Singh Raja Warring	Sukhbir Singh Badal
Party	AAP	INC	SAD
Last election	69	1,432	284
Seats won	954	393	192
Seat change	▲885	▼1,039	▼92
Popular vote	1,083,566	448,989	217,116
Percentage	48.46%	20.08%	9.71%
	Fourth party	Fifth party
Leader	Sunil Kumar Jakhar	Avtar Singh Karimpuri
Party	BJP	BSP
Last election	49	5
Seats won	172	7
Seat change	▲123	▲2
Popular vote	194,532	7,826
Percentage	8.70%	0.35%

Municipal elections were held in the Indian state of Punjab on 26 May 2026. The elections took place for 105 urban local bodies, including 8 municipal corporations, 76 municipal councils and 21 nagar panchayats.

== Background ==
Previously, elections for the five major municipal corporations in Amritsar, Jalandhar, Ludhiana, Patiala and Phagwara were held in December 2024, where Aam Aadmi Party lead the elections, winning 158 of 375 seats and had secured top positions in all these corporations. The 2026 elections covered a different set of eight municipal corporations including Mohali, Bathinda, Abohar, Barnala, Kapurthala, Moga, Batala and Pathankot; along with 76 municipal councils and 21 nagar panchayats, which were going to polls separately from the five corporations that voted in 2024.

== Elections ==
The Punjab State Election Commission announced the election schedule on 11 May 2026 at a press conference in Chandigarh held by State Election Commissioner Raj Kamal Chaudhuri. With the announcement, the Model Code of Conduct came into immediate effect across all affected jurisdictions. A total of 2,019 wards were contested across the 105 municipal bodies. For the elections, 3,977 polling stations were established across the districts. About 36,000 election personnel and 35,500 police personnel were deployed on election duty. IAS and PCS officers were appointed as observers in every district to monitor the polling process.

=== Expenditure limits ===
The State Election Commission notified the following campaign expenditure limits for candidates:

Category	Expenditure Limit
Municipal Corporation	₹4,00,000
Municipal Council – Class I	₹3,60,000
Municipal Council – Class II	₹2,30,000
Municipal Council – Class III	₹2,00,000
Nagar Panchayat	₹1,40,000

== Voter statistics ==
Gender	No. of voters
Male	18,98,990
Female	17,73,716
Other	226
Total	36,72,932

== Schedule ==
The election schedule was announced by the Punjab State Election Commission on 11 May 2026.

Poll event	Schedule
Notification date	11 May 2026
Start of nomination filing	13 May 2026
Last date for filing nomination	16 May 2026
Scrutiny of nomination	18 May 2026
Last date for withdrawal of nomination	19 May 2026
Date of poll	26 May 2026
Date of counting of votes	29 May 2026

== Municipal corporations ==
Elections were held for the following eight municipal corporations:

S.No.	Municipal Corporation
1.	Mohali Municipal Corporation
2.	Bathinda Municipal Corporation
3.	Abohar Municipal Corporation
4.	Barnala Municipal Corporation
5.	Kapurthala Municipal Corporation
6.	Moga Municipal Corporation
7.	Batala Municipal Corporation
8.	Pathankot Municipal Corporation

== Results ==
=== Results by alliance or party ===
Alliance/ Party	Popular vote		Seats		
Alliance/ Party	Votes	pp	Contested	Won	+/−
Aam Aadmi Party	1,083,566	48.46%	1,801	954	▲885
Indian National Congress	448,989	20.08%	1,550	393	▼1,039
Independents	283,972	12.70%	1,528	251	▼58
Shiromani Akali Dal	217,116	9.71%	1,251	192	▼92
Bharatiya Janata Party	194,532	8.70%	1,316	172	▲123
Bahujan Samaj Party	7,826	0.35%	96	07	▲2
Others			13	00	
NOTA					
Total		100%	1,977		—

=== Municipal Corporations ===
Total	AAP	BJP
8	6	2

Municipal Corporations
Corporation	Total Seats	Wards won				
Corporation	Total Seats	AAP	INC	BJP	SAD	Others
Mohali	50	27	12	3	4	4
Bathinda	50	35	5	1	3	6
Abohar	50	20	1	28	0	1
Barnala	50	36	2	7	0	5
Kapurthala	50	11	31	3	3	2
Moga	50	30	7	3	3	7
Batala	50	30	18	2	0	0
Pathankot	50	10	18	22	0	0

== Municipal councils results ==
=== District wise results ===
S. No.	District	Total seats						
S. No.	District	Total seats	AAP	INC	SAD	BJP	BSP	Others
1.	Amritsar	52	41	3	8	0	0	0
2.	Barnala	41	21	0	2	1	0	17
3.	Bathinda	174	57	17	65	0	0	35
4.	Faridkot	71	41	15	12	0	0	3
5.	Fatehgarh Sahib	80	51	14	4	4	0	7
6.	Fazilka	36	11	10	4	11	0	0
7.	Firozpur	76	26	28	8	8	1	5
8.	Gurdaspur	37	14	12	4	1	0	6
9.	Hoshiarpur	80	46	20	0	8	0	6
10.	Jalandhar	99	49	21	2	3	2	22
11.	Kapurthala	13	5	0	1	0	0	7
12.	Ludhiana	112	56	36	9	6	0	5
13.	Malerkotla	61	30	15	2	1	1	12
14.	Mansa	85	25	5	13	6	1	35
15.	Moga	13	12	0	0	0	0	1
16.	Pathankot	15	4	4	0	4	0	3
17.	Patiala	92	41	20	9	16	0	6
18.	Rupnagar	92	37	26	5	7	0	17
19.	S.A.S. Nagar	118	57	17	11	24	0	9
20.	Sangrur	74	55	7	2	1	0	9
21.	S.B.S. Nagar	47	16	8	4	1	2	16
22.	Sri Muktsar Sahib	77	51	14	11	1	0	0
23.	Tarn Taran	32	13	11	3	0	0	5
Total		1,577	759	303	179	103	7	226

== Nagar Panchayats ==
Nagar Panchayat election results, 2026
Sr. No.	District	Nagar Panchayat	Wards	AAP	BJP	BSP	INC	IND	SAD	Declared
1	Amritsar	Rayya	13	11	0	0	2	0	0	13
2	Bathinda	Bhagta Bhai Ka	13	1	0	0	5	0	7	13
3	Bathinda	Bhai Rupa	13	9	0	0	1	2	1	13
4	Bathinda	Kot Shamir	13	1	0	0	1	2	9	13
5	Bathinda	Kotha Guru	11	7	0	0	0	2	2	11
6	Bathinda	Lehra Mohabbat	11	0	0	0	0	5	6	11
7	Bathinda	Maluka	11	2	0	0	0	0	9	11
8	Bathinda	Mehraj	13	8	0	0	0	0	5	13
9	Bathinda	Nathana	11	2	0	0	0	3	6	11
10	Fatehgarh Sahib	Khamano	13	6	0	0	2	3	2	13
11	Fazilka	Arniwala Sheikh Subhan	11	6	0	0	1	0	4	11
12	Ferozepur	Mudki	13	7	0	0	0	0	6	13
13	Jalandhar	Lohian Khas	13	9	0	0	4	0	0	13
14	Jalandhar	Mehatpur	13	2	0	0	7	2	2	13
15	Malerkotla	Amargarh	11	3	0	1	1	6	0	11
16	Mansa	Boha	13	3	0	0	0	7	3	13
17	Mansa	Joga	13	5	0	0	0	8	0	13
18	Moga	Kot Ise Khan	13	12	0	0	0	1	0	13
19	Rupnagar	Kiratpur Sahib	11	4	0	0	0	6	1	11
20	Tarn Taran	Bhikhiwind	13	7	0	0	2	1	3	13

== See also ==
- 2024 Punjab, India local elections
- 2024 Indian general election in Punjab
- Elections in Punjab
- 2026 elections in India
