= 2021 elections in India =

Elections in India
- 2021

Elections in India in 2021 include by-elections to the Lok Sabha, elections to the Rajya Sabha, elections to legislative assemblies of 4 states and 1 union territory, and other by-elections to state legislative assemblies, councils and local bodies.

== Legislative assembly elections ==
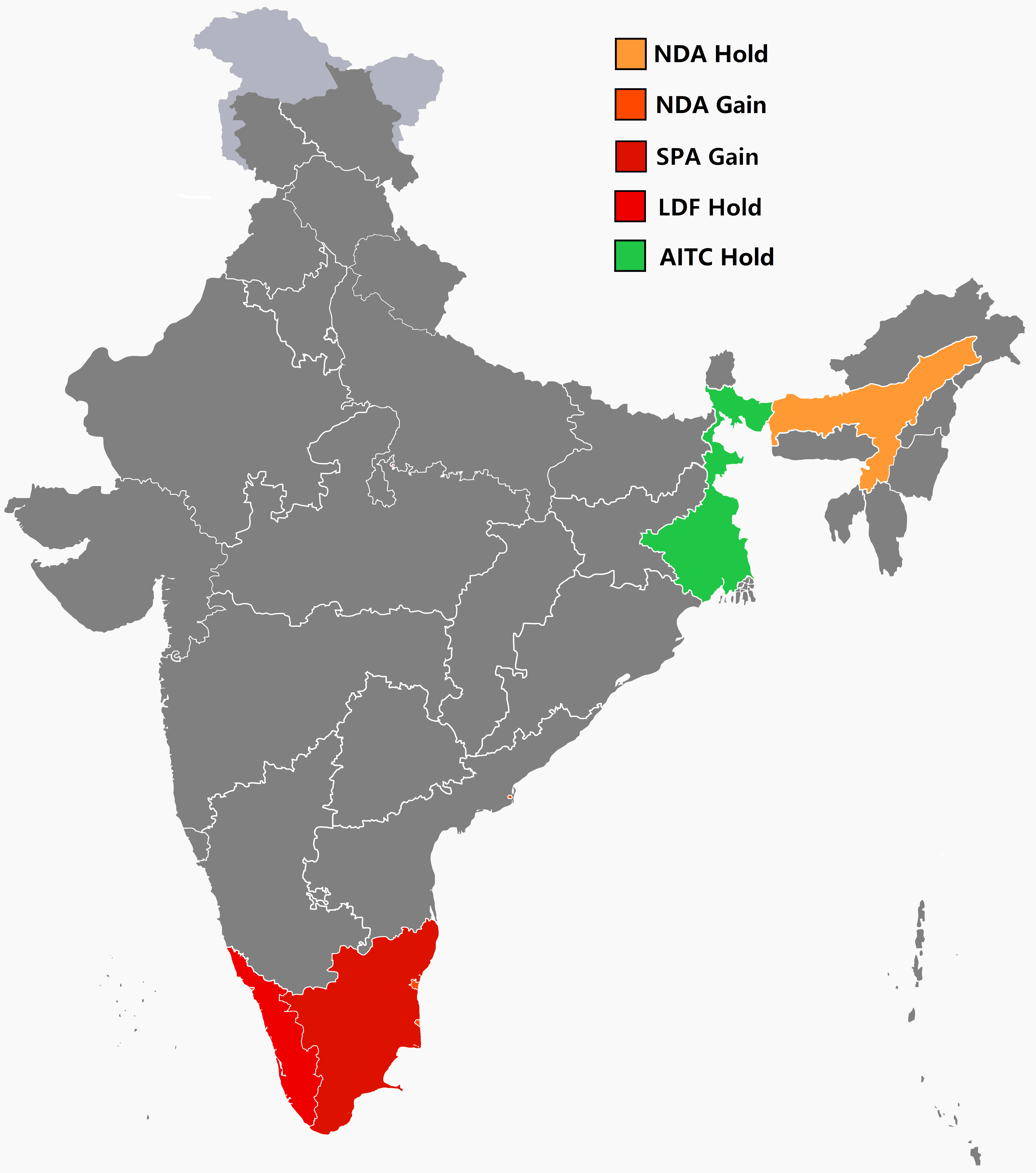
2021 Indian election Result Colour Map

Date(s)	State/UT	Government Before	Chief Minister before election	Government After	Elected Chief Minister	Maps
27 March – 6 April 2021	Assam	Bharatiya Janata Party	Sarbananda Sonowal	Bharatiya Janata Party	Himanta Biswa Sarma	
27 March – 6 April 2021	Assam	Asom Gana Parishad	Sarbananda Sonowal	Asom Gana Parishad	Himanta Biswa Sarma	
6 April 2021	Kerala	Communist Party of India (Marxist)	Pinarayi Vijayan	Communist Party of India (Marxist)	Pinarayi Vijayan	
6 April 2021	Puducherry	President's rule		All India N. R. Congress	N. Rangaswamy	
6 April 2021	Puducherry	President's rule		Bharatiya Janata Party	N. Rangaswamy	
6 April 2021	Tamil Nadu	All India Anna Dravida Munnetra Kazhagam	Edappadi K. Palaniswami	Dravida Munnetra Kazhagam	M. K. Stalin	
27 March – 29 April 2021	West Bengal	All India Trinamool Congress	Mamata Banerjee	All India Trinamool Congress	Mamata Banerjee	

== Lok Sabha by-elections ==
S.No	Date	Constituency	State/UT	MP before election	Party before election	Elected MP	Party after election	Remarks
1	6 April 2021	Kanniyakumari	Tamil Nadu	H. Vasanthakumar	Indian National Congress	Vijay Vasanth	Indian National Congress	Death of H. Vasanthakumar
2	6 April 2021	Malappuram	Kerala	P. K. Kunhalikutty	Indian Union Muslim League	M. P. Abdussamad Samadani	Indian Union Muslim League	Resignation by P. K. Kunhalikutty
3	17 April 2021	Tirupati	Andhra Pradesh	Balli Durga Prasad Rao	YSR Congress Party	Maddila Gurumoorthy	YSR Congress Party	Death of Balli Durga Prasad Rao
4	17 April 2021	Belgaum	Karnataka	Suresh Angadi	Bharatiya Janata Party	Mangala Suresh Angadi	Bharatiya Janata Party	Death of Suresh Angadi
5	30 October 2021	Dadra and Nagar Haveli	Dadra and Nagar Haveli and Daman and Diu	Mohanbhai Sanjibhai Delkar	Independent	Kalaben Delkar	Shiv Sena	Death of Mohanbhai Sanjibhai Delkar
6	30 October 2021	Khandwa	Madhya Pradesh	Nandkumar Singh Chauhan	Bharatiya Janata Party	Gyaneswar Patil	Bharatiya Janata Party	Death of Nandkumar Singh Chauhan
7	30 October 2021	Mandi	Himachal Pradesh	Ram Swaroop Sharma	Bharatiya Janata Party	Pratibha Singh	Indian National Congress	Death of Ram Swaroop Sharma

== Legislative assembly By-elections ==
=== Andhra Pradesh ===
S.No	Date	Constituency	MLA before election	Party before election	Elected MLA	Party after election
124	30 October 2021	Badvel	Gunthoti Venkata Subbaiah	YSR Congress Party	Dasari Sudha	YSR Congress Party

=== Assam ===
S.No	Date	Constituency	MLA before election	Party before election	Elected MLA	Party after election
28	30 October 2021	Gossaigaon	Majendra Narzary	Bodoland People's Front	Jiron Basumatary	United People's Party Liberal
41	30 October 2021	Bhabanipur	Phanidhar Talukdar	All India United Democratic Front	Phanidhar Talukdar	Bharatiya Janata Party
58	30 October 2021	Tamulpur	Leho Ram Boro	United People's Party Liberal	Jolen Daimary	United People's Party Liberal
101	30 October 2021	Mariani	Rupjyoti Kurmi	Indian National Congress	Rupjyoti Kurmi	Bharatiya Janata Party
107	30 October 2021	Thowra	Sushanta Borgohain	Indian National Congress	Sushanta Borgohain	Bharatiya Janata Party

=== Bihar ===
S.No	Date	Constituency	MLA before election	Party before election	Elected MLA	Party after election
78	30 October 2021	Kusheshwar Asthan	Shashi Bhushan Hazari	Janata Dal (United)	Aman Bhushan Hajari	Janata Dal (United)
164	30 October 2021	Tarapur	Mewalal Chaudhary	Janata Dal (United)	Rajeev Kumar Singh	Janata Dal (United)

=== Gujarat ===
S.No	Date	Constituency	MLA before election	Party before election	Elected MLA	Party after election
125	17 April 2021	Morva Hadaf	Bhupendrasinh Khant	Independent	Nimisha Suthar	Bharatiya Janata Party

=== Haryana ===
S.No	Date	Constituency	MLA before election	Party before election	Elected MLA	Party after election
46	30 October 2021	Ellenabad	Abhay Singh Chautala	Indian National Lok Dal	Abhay Singh Chautala	Indian National Lok Dal

=== Himachal Pradesh ===
S.No	Date	Constituency	MLA before election	Party before election	Elected MLA	Party after election
8	30 October 2021	Fatehpur	Sujan Singh Pathania	Indian National Congress	Bhawani Singh Pathania	Indian National Congress
50	30 October 2021	Arki	Virbhadra Singh	Indian National Congress	Sanjay Awasthy	Indian National Congress
65	30 October 2021	Jubbal-Kotkhai	Narinder Bragta	Bharatiya Janata Party	Rohit Thakur	Indian National Congress

=== Jharkhand ===
S.No	Date	Constituency	MLA before election	Party before election	Elected MLA	Party after election
13	17 April 2021	Madhupur	Haji Hussain Ansari	Jharkhand Mukti Morcha	Hafizul Hasan	Jharkhand Mukti Morcha

=== Karnataka ===
S.No	Date	Constituency	MLA before election	Party before election	Elected MLA	Party after election
47	17 April 2021	Basavakalyan	B. Narayan Rao	Indian National Congress	Sharanu Salagar	Bharatiya Janata Party
59	17 April 2021	Maski	Pratapgouda Patil	Indian National Congress	Basangouda Turvihal	Indian National Congress
33	30 October 2021	Sindagi	Mallappa Managuli	Janata Dal (Secular)	Bhusanur Ramesh Balappa	Bharatiya Janata Party
82	30 October 2021	Hangal	C. M. Udasi	Bharatiya Janata Party	Srinivas Mane	Indian National Congress

=== Madhya Pradesh ===
S.No	Date	Constituency	MLA before election	Party before election	Elected MLA	Party after election
55	17 April 2021	Damoh	Rahul Lodhi	Indian National Congress	Ajay Kumar Tandon	Indian National Congress
45	30 October 2021	Prithvipur	Brijendra Singh Rathore	Indian National Congress	Shishupal Yadav	Bharatiya Janata Party
62	30 October 2021	Raigaon	Jugal Kishore Bagri	Bharatiya Janata Party	Kalpana Verma	Indian National Congress
192	30 October 2021	Jobat	Kalawati Bhuria	Indian National Congress	Sulochana Rawat	Bharatiya Janata Party

=== Maharashtra ===
S.No	Date	Constituency	MLA before election	Party before election	Elected MLA	Party after election
252	17 April 2021	Pandharpur	Bharat Bhalke	Nationalist Congress Party	Samadhan Autade	Bharatiya Janata Party
90	30 October 2021	Deglur	Raosaheb Antapurkar	Indian National Congress	Jitesh Antapurkar	Indian National Congress

=== Meghalaya ===
S.No	Date	Constituency	MLA before election	Party before election	Elected MLA	Party after election
13	30 October 2021	Mawryngkneng	David Nongrum	Indian National Congress	Pyniaid Sing Syiem	National People's Party
24	30 October 2021	Mawphlang	Syntar Klas Sunn	Independent	Eugeneson Lyngdoh	United Democratic Party
47	30 October 2021	Rajabala	Azad Zaman	Indian National Congress	MD. Abdus Saleh	National People's Party

=== Mizoram ===
S.No	Date	Constituency	MLA before election	Party before election	Elected MLA	Party after election
26	17 April 2021	Serchhip	Lalduhoma	Zoram People's Movement	Lalduhoma	Zoram People's Movement
4	30 October 2021	Tuirial	Andrew H. Thangliana	Zoram People's Movement	K. Laldawngliana	Mizo National Front

=== Nagaland ===
S.No	Date	Constituency	MLA before election	Party before election	Elected MLA	Party after election
51	17 April 2021	Noksen	C. M. Chang	Nationalist Democratic Progressive Party	H. Chuba Chang	Nationalist Democratic Progressive Party
58	30 October 2021	Shamator Chessore	Toshi Wungtung	Nationalist Democratic Progressive Party	Keoshu Yimchunger	Nationalist Democratic Progressive Party

=== Odisha ===
S.No	Date	Constituency	MLA before election	Party before election	Elected MLA	Party after election
110	30 September 2021	Pipili	Pradeep Maharathy	Biju Janata Dal	Rudra Pratap Maharathy	Biju Janata Dal

=== Rajasthan ===
S.No	Date	Constituency	MLA before election	Party before election	Elected MLA	Party after election
24	17 April 2021	Sujangarh	Bhanwarlal Meghwal	Indian National Congress	Manoj Meghwal	Indian National Congress
175	17 April 2021	Rajsamand	Kiran Maheshwari	Bharatiya Janata Party	Deepti Maheshwari	Bharatiya Janata Party
179	17 April 2021	Sahara	Kailash Chandra Trivedi	Indian National Congress	Gayatri Devi Trivedi	Indian National Congress
155	30 October 2021	Vallabhnagar	Gajendra Singh Shaktawat	Indian National Congress	Preeti Shaktawat	Indian National Congress
157	30 October 2021	Dhariawad	Gautam Lal Meena	Bharatiya Janata Party	Nagraj Meena	Indian National Congress

=== Telangana ===
S.No	Date	Constituency	MLA before election	Party before election	Elected MLA	Party after election
87	17 April 2021	Nagarjuna Sagar	Nomula Narsimhaiah	Bharat Rashtra Samithi	Nomula Bhagath	Bharat Rashtra Samithi
31	30 October 2021	Huzurabad	Etela Rajender	Bharat Rashtra Samithi	Etela Rajender	Bharatiya Janata Party

=== Uttarakhand ===
S.No	Date	Constituency	MLA before election	Party before election	Elected MLA	Party after election
49	17 April 2021	Salt	Surendra Singh Jeena	Bharatiya Janata Party	Mahesh Singh Jeena	Bharatiya Janata Party

=== West Bengal ===
Date	Constituency		Previous MLA		Reason	Elected MLA	
30 September 2021	159	Bhabanipur	Sovandeb Chattopadhyay	Trinamool Congress	Resigned on 21 May 2021	Mamata Banerjee	Trinamool Congress
30 October 2021	7	Dinhata	Nisith Pramanik	Bharatiya Janata Party	Resigned on 12 May 2021	Udayan Guha	Trinamool Congress
30 October 2021	86	Santipur	Jagannath Sarkar	Bharatiya Janata Party	Resigned on 12 May 2021	Braja Kishore Goswami	Trinamool Congress
30 October 2021	109	Khardaha	Kajal Sinha	Trinamool Congress	Died on 25 April 2021	Sovandeb Chattopadhyay	Trinamool Congress
30 October 2021	127	Gosaba	Jayanta Naskar	Trinamool Congress	Died on 19 June 2021	Subrata Mondal	Trinamool Congress

== Local Body Elections ==
=== Andhra Pradesh ===
S.No.	Date	Municipal corporations	Winner 2021
1.	10 March 2021	Greater Visakhapatnam Municipal Corporation	YSR Congress Party
2.	10 March 2021	Vijayawada Municipal Corporation	YSR Congress Party
3.	10 March 2021	Guntur Municipal Corporation	YSR Congress Party
4.	10 March 2021	Tirupati Municipal Corporation	YSR Congress Party
5.	10 March 2021	Kurnool Municipal Corporation	YSR Congress Party
6.	10 March 2021	Ongole Municipal Corporation	YSR Congress Party
7.	10 March 2021	Machilipatnam Municipal Corporation	YSR Congress Party
8.	10 March 2021	Kadapa Municipal Corporation	YSR Congress Party
9.	10 March 2021	Vizianagaram Municipal Corporation	YSR Congress Party
10.	10 March 2021	Anantapuramu Municipal Corporation	YSR Congress Party
11.	10 March 2021	Eluru Municipal Corporation	YSR Congress Party
12.	10 March 2021	Chittoor Municipal Corporation	YSR Congress Party
13.	15 November 2021	Nellore Municipal Corporation	YSR Congress Party

=== Chandigarh ===
S.No.	Date	Municipal corporations	Winner 2021
1.	24 December 2021	Chandigarh Municipal Corporation	Bharatiya Janata Party

=== Chhattisgarh ===
S.No.	Date	Municipal corporations	Winner 2021
1.	20 December 2021	Birgaon Municipal Corporation	Indian National Congress
2.	20 December 2021	Bhilai Municipal Corporation	Indian National Congress
3.	20 December 2021	Risali Municipal Corporation	Indian National Congress
4.	20 December 2021	Bhilai-Charauda Municipal Corporation	Indian National Congress

=== Goa ===
S.No.	Date	Municipal corporations	Winner 2021
1.	March 2021	Municipal Corporation of Panaji	Bharatiya Janata Party

=== Gujarat ===
S.No.	Date	Municipal corporations	Winner 2021
1.	February 2021	Ahmedabad Municipal Corporation	Bharatiya Janata Party
2.	February 2021	Surat Municipal Corporation	Bharatiya Janata Party
3.	February 2021	Vadodara Municipal Corporation	Bharatiya Janata Party
4.	February 2021	Rajkot Municipal Corporation	Bharatiya Janata Party
5.	February 2021	Jamnagar Municipal Corporation	Bharatiya Janata Party
6.	February 2021	Bhavnagar Municipal Corporation	Bharatiya Janata Party
7.	October 2021	Gandhinagar Municipal Corporation	Bharatiya Janata Party

=== Himachal Pradesh ===
S.No.	Date	Municipal corporations	Winner 2021
1.	April 2021	Palampur Municipal Corporation	Indian National Congress
2.	April 2021	Solan Municipal Corporation	Indian National Congress
3.	April 2021	Mandi Municipal Corporation	Bharatiya Janata Party
4.	April 2021	Dharamshala Municipal Corporation	Bharatiya Janata Party

=== Karnataka ===
S.No.	Date	Municipal corporations	Winner 2021
1.	May 2021	Ballari Municipal Corporation	Indian National Congress
2.	September 2021	Kalaburagi Municipal Corporation	Bharatiya Janata Party
3.	September 2021	Belagavi Municipal Corporation	Bharatiya Janata Party
4.	September 2021	Hubli-Dharwad Municipal Corporation	Bharatiya Janata Party

=== Meghalaya ===
S.No.	Date	Autonomous councils	Winner 2021
1.	April 2021	Garo Hills Autonomous District Council	National People's Party

=== Mizoram ===
S.No.	Date	Municipal corporations	Winner 2021
1.	February 2021	Aizawl Municipal Corporation	Mizo National Front

=== Punjab ===
S.No.	Date	Municipal corporations	Winner 2021
1.	14 February 2021	Abohar Municipal Corporation	Indian National Congress
2.	14 February 2021	Batala Municipal Corporation	Indian National Congress
3.	14 February 2021	Bathinda Municipal Corporation	Indian National Congress
4.	14 February 2021	Hoshiarpur Municipal Corporation	Indian National Congress
5.	14 February 2021	Kapurthala Municipal Corporation	Indian National Congress
6.	14 February 2021	Mohali Municipal Corporation	Indian National Congress
7.	14 February 2021	Moga Municipal Corporation	Indian National Congress
8.	14 February 2021	Pathankot Municipal Corporation	Indian National Congress

=== Rajasthan ===
S.No.	Date	Municipal corporations	Winner 2021
1.	January 2021	Ajmer Municipal Corporation	Bharatiya Janata Party

=== Sikkim ===
S.No.	Date	Municipal corporations	Winner 2021
1.	31 March 2021	Gangtok Municipal Corporation	Independent

=== Telangana ===
S.No.	Date	Municipal corporations	Winner 2021
1.	May 2021	Greater Warangal Municipal Corporation	Bharat Rashtra Samithi
2.	May 2021	Khammam Municipal Corporation	Bharat Rashtra Samithi

=== Tripura ===
S.No.	Date	Municipal corporations/ Autonomous councils	Winner 2021
1.	6 April 2021	Tripura Tribal Areas Autonomous District Council	Tipra Motha Party
2	25 November 2021	Agartala Municipal Corporation	Bharatiya Janata Party

=== West Bengal ===
S.No.	Date	Municipal corporations	Winner 2021
1.	19 December 2021	Kolkata Municipal Corporation	Trinamool Congress

== See also ==
- 2020 elections in India
- 2022 elections in India
- 2021 Indian Rajya Sabha elections
