= 2021 Punjab, India local elections =

Local elections in India

2021 Punjab municipal elections
- 14 February 2021

2215 seats (400 municipal corporations + 1815 municipal councils/ nagar panchayats)
- Turnout: 73.53%

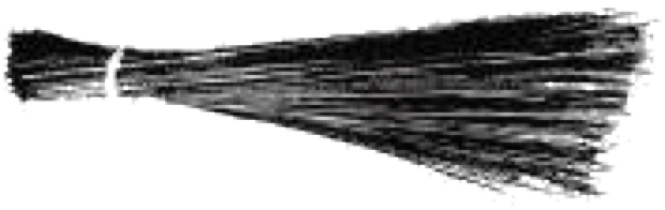
| | Majority party | Minority party |
|---|---|---|
| Leader | Amarinder Singh | Sukhbir Singh Badal |
| Party | INC | SAD |
| Leader's seat | -- | -- |
| Last election | 267 | 37 |
| Seats won | 317 | 33 |
| Seat change | ▲51 | ▼4 |
| | Third party | Fourth party |
| Leader | Ashwani Kumar Sharma | Bhagwant Maan |
| Party | BJP | AAP |
| Last election | 15 | 1 |
| Seats won | 20 | 18 |
| Seat change | ▲5 | ▲17 |

Municipal elections were held in the Indian state of Punjab on 14 February 2021; the result was declared on 17 February. The elections are scheduled for 117 urban local bodies, including 8 municipal corporations and 109 municipal councils and nagar panchayats. Elections were originally scheduled to be held in October 2020, but were delayed because of the COVID-19 pandemic.

== Background ==
The previous elections were held in February 2015, in which Shiromani Akali Dal and Bharatiya Janata Party led in most of the councils. The elections were the first since Akali Dal left the National Democratic Alliance over the farm laws protest; both Akali Dal and BJP were contesting alone. Bhagwant Maan, the state president of Aam Aadmi Party, said the party will contest elections on its party symbol (broom). Jarnail Nangal of Lok Insaaf Party demanded to postpone the elections, saying that a large number of farmers and peasants from the state were present at the farmers' protest in Delhi.

== Elections ==
On 16 January 2021, Punjab's state election commission announced the schedule for elections. Nominations were filed until 3 February, elections on 14 February and results on 17 February.

The expenditure limit for a candidate of a municipal corporation is ₹ 3 lakh; for the candidate of municipal council Class-I is ₹ 2.70 lakh, Class-II is ₹ 1.70 lakh, Class-III is ₹ 1.45 lakh, and candidates for Nagar panchayats is ₹ 1.05 lakh.

He said that 400 members would be elected for eight municipal corporations and 1,902 members would be elected for 109 municipal councils/Nagar panchayats in the state. Fifty per cent reservation has been given for women in municipal elections, according to Punjab Government's instructions.

=== Election day ===
20,510 polling officers with 19,000 police officials were posted for peaceful and fair elections in 109 municipal councils and nagar panchayats with eight municipal corporations.

In Bathinda Ward no. 34, a fake voter was caught in the polling booth. At many places conflict between Congress, AAP and Akali workers was seen.

Repolling for two booths of Samana and one booth of Patran in Patiala district was held on 16 February 2021.

Repolling for two booths of Mohali is ordered by Punjab Election Commission on 17 February 2021 on the day of results and subsequently, the result for Mohali Municipal Corporation was postponed to 18 February 2021.

== Voter statistics ==
| Gender | No. of voters |
|---|---|
| Male | 20,49,777 |
| Female | 18,65,354 |
| Other | 149 |
| Total | 39,15,280 |

=== Voter turnout ===
| S. no. | District | Vote% |
|---|---|---|
| 1. | Mansa | 82.99 |
| 2. | Bathinda | 79 |
| 3. | Sangrur | 77.39 |
| 4. | Fatehgarh Sahib | 75.78 |
| 5. | Faridkot | 71.03 |
| 6. | Pathankot | 75.37 |
| 7. | Ferozepur | 74.01 |
| 8. | Ropar | 73.90 |
| 9. | Jalandhar | 73.29 |
| 10. | Fazilka | 72.40 |
| 11. | Barnala | 71.99 |
| 12. | Patiala | 70.09 |
| 13. | Ludhiana | 70.33 |
| 14. | Amritsar | 71.20 |
| 15. | Moga | 69.50 |
| 16. | Kapurthala | 64.34 |
| 17. | Sri Muktsar Sahib | 68.65 |
| 18. | Hoshiarpur | 66.68 |
| 19. | Gurdaspur | 70.00 |
| 20. | S. B. S. Nagar | 69.71 |
| 21. | Tarn Taran | 73.12 |
| 22. | Mohali | 60.08 |
| Total | | 73.53 |

== Schedule ==
The election schedule was announced by the Election Commission of Punjab on 16 January 2021.

| Poll event | Schedule |
|---|---|
| Notification date | 30 January 2021 |
| Last date for filing nomination | 3 February 2021 |
| Scrutiny of nomination | 4 February 2021 |
| Last date for withdrawal of nomination | 5 February 2021 |
| Date of poll | 14 February 2021 |
| Date of counting of votes | 17 February 2021 |

== Party wise candidates ==
| S.no. | Party | Symbol | Candidates | Percentage |
|---|---|---|---|---|
| 1. | Indian National Congress | | 2037 | 22.09% |
| 2. | Shiromani Akali Dal | | 1569 | 17.01% |
| 3. | Aam Aadmi Party | | 1606 | 17.41% |
| 4. | Bharatiya Janata Party | | 1003 | 10.88% |
| 6 | Independent | | 2832 | 30.71% |
| 7. | Others | | 175 | 1.90% |
| Total | | | 9222 | 100% |

== List of participating municipal corporations/councils ==
=== Municipal corporations ===
Punjab has 13 municipal corporations, and eight went to the polls on 14 February 2021. In contrast, Ludhiana, Jalandhar, Patiala and Amritsar polled in 2018, and polling for Phagwara was suspended due to voter list formation.

Municipal corporations
| Rank | City | District | Municipal corporation | Area km2 | Population (2011) | Formation |
|---|---|---|---|---|---|---|
| 1. | Bathinda | Bathinda | Bathinda Municipal Corporation | | 285,813 | |
| 2. | Batala | Gurdaspur | Batala Municipal Corporation | 42 | 211,594 | 2019 |
| 3. | Mohali | Mohali | Mohali Municipal Corporation | 176.17 | 174,000 | |
| 4. | Hoshiarpur | Hoshiarpur | Hoshiarpur Municipal Corporation | | 168,731 | |
| 5. | Moga | Moga | Moga Municipal Corporation | | 163,897 | |
| 6. | Pathankot | Pathankot | Pathankot Municipal Corporation | | 159,460 | |
| 7. | Abohar | Fazilka | Abohar Municipal Corporation | 188.24 | 145,658 | 2019 |
| 8. | Kapurthala | Kapurthala | Kapurthala Municipal Corporation | | 101,854 | 2019 |

=== List of municipal councils ===
The municipal councils list is as follows:

| Sl. No. | District | Class-I | Class-II | Class-III |
|---|---|---|---|---|
| 1 | Sri Amritsar Sahib | - | 1. Jandiala Guru | 1. Majitha; 2. Ramdass |
| 2 | Gurdaspur | 1. Gurdaspur | 2. Dinanagar; 3. Dhariwal | 3. Quadian; 4. Sri Hargobindpur 5. Dera Baba Nanak 6. Fatehgarh Churian |
| 3 | Pathankot | | 4. Sujanpur | |
| 4 | Sri Tarn Taran Sahib | - | 5. Tarn Taran; 6. Patti | - |
| 5 | Jalandhar | 3. Nakodar | 7. Noormahal; 8. Phillaur 9. Kartarpur 10. Bhogpur 11. Adampur 12. Goraya | 7. Alawalpur |
| 6 | Kapurthala | | 13. Sultanpur Lodhi | - |
| 7 | Hoshiarpur | | 14. Dasuya; 15. Mukerian 16. Urmur Tanda 17. Garh Shankar | 8. Garhdiwala; 9. Hariana 10. Sham Churasi |
| 8 | Shaheed Bhagat Singh Nagar | 4. Nawanshahr | 18. Banga | 11. Rahon; 12. Balachaur |
| 9 | Ludhiana | 5. Khanna; 6. Jagraon | 19. Samrala; 20. Raikot 21. Sahnewal 22. Doraha 23. Mullanpur Dakha | 13. Payal; 14. Machhiwara |
| 10 | Roopnagar | 7. Nangal; 8. Anandpur Sahib | 24. Roop Nagar; 25. Morinda | |
| 11 | Sri Fatehgarh Sahib | 9. Gobindgarh | 26. Sirhind FG Sahib | 15. Bassi Pathana; 16. Amloh |
| 12 | Patiala | 10. Rajpura; 11. Nabha 12 Samana | 27. Patran | 17. Sanaur |
| 13 | Sangrur | 13. Sangrur; 14. Malerkotla 15. Sunam | 28. Ahmadgarh; 29. Dhuri 30. Lehragaga | 18. Longowal; 19. Bhawanigarh |
| 14 | Barnala | 16. Barnala | - | 20. Tapa; 21. Bhadaur 22. Dhanaula |
| 15 | Sahibzada Ajit singh Nagar | 17. Kharar; 18. Zirakpur 19. Dera Bassi | 31. Kurali | 23. Banur |
| 16 | Bathinda | - | 32. Rampura phul; 33. Bhucho Mandi 34. Goniana 35. Maur 36. Raman | 24. Kotfatta; 25. Sangat |
| 17 | Mansa | 20. Mansa | 37. Budhlada | 26. Bareta |
| 18 | Sri Muktsar Sahib | 21. Sri Muktsar Sahib; 22. Malout | 38. Gidderbaha | - |
| 19 | Firozpur | 23. Ferozepur | 39. Guru Har Sahai; 40. Zira 41. Talwandi Bhai | |
| 20 | Fazilka | 24. Fazilka | 42. Jalalabad | - |
| 21 | Faridkot | 25. Faridkot; 26. Kotkapura | 43. Jaito | - |
| 22 | Moga | - | 44. Bagha Purana; 45. Dharamkot | - |
| Total | | 26 | 45 | 26 |

== Party wise results ==
| S.no. | Party | Symbol | Candidates | Municipal corporations results 400 seats | Municipal councils/ panchayats results | Total seats won |
|---|---|---|---|---|---|---|
| 1. | Indian National Congress | | 2037 | 317 | 1,115 | 1432 |
| 2. | Shiromani Akali Dal | | 1569 | 33 | 251 | 284 |
| 3. | Aam Aadmi Party | | 1606 | 18 | 51 | 69 |
| 4. | Bharatiya Janata Party | | 1003 | 20 | 29 | 49 |
| 6 | Independent | | 2832 | 12 | 352 | 364 |
| 7. | Others | | 175 | 0 | 17(5 BSP + 12 CPI) | 17 |
| Total | | | 9222 | 400 | 1815 | 2215 |

== Municipal corporations results ==
| S.no. | Municipal corporations | | | | | | |
|---|---|---|---|---|---|---|---|
| 1. | Party | | | | | | |
| 1. | Party | INC | SAD | AAP+ | BJP | Others | Total |
| 2. | MC won | 8 | 0 | 0 | 0 | 0 | 8 |
| 3. | Seats won | 317 | 33 | 18 | 20 | 21 | 400 |

=== Municipal corporation detailed results ===
| SnNo. | Municipal corporations | Seats | | | | | |
| SnNo. | Municipal corporations | Seats | Indian National Congress | Shiromani Akali Dal | Aam Aadmi Party | Bharatiya Janata Party | Others |
|---|---|---|---|---|---|---|---|
| 1. | Abohar | 50 | 49 | 1 | 0 | 0 | 0 |
| 2. | Batala | 50 | 36 | 6 | 3 | 4 | 1 |
| 3. | Bathinda | 50 | 43 | 7 | 0 | 0 | 0 |
| 4. | Hoshiarpur | 50 | 41 | 0 | 2 | 4 | 3 |
| 5. | Kapurthala | 50 | 45 | 3 | 0 | 0 | 2 |
| 6. | Mohali | 50 | 37 | 0 | 9 | 0 | 4 |
| 7. | Moga | 50 | 29 | 15 | 4 | 1 | 1 |
| 8. | Pathankot | 50 | 37 | 1 | 0 | 11 | 1 |
| Total | | 400 | 317 | 33 | 18 | 20 | 21 |

== Municipal councils results ==
Municipal councils/nagar panchayats
| Party | | | | | | | | |
| Party | INC | SAD | AAP | CPI | BJP | BSP | Others/hung | Total |
| Councils/ panchayats won | 77 | 5 | 0 | 1 | 0 | 0 | 26 | 109 |
| Seats won | 1,115 | 251 | 51 | 12 | 29 | 5 | 352 | 1,815 |

=== District wise municipal councils/nagar panchayat results ===
| S.no. | Districts | Total seats | | | | | | |
| S.no. | Districts | Total seats | Indian National Congress | Shiromani Akali Dal | Aam Aadmi Party | Bharatiya Janata Party | Bahujan Samaj Party | Others |
| 1. | Amritsar | 67 | 39 | 25 | 0 | 0 | 0 | 3 |
| 2. | Barnala | 72 | 28 | 10 | 3 | 0 | 0 | 31 |
| 3. | Bathinda | 170 | 117 | 26 | 3 | 0 | 1 | 23 |
| 4. | Faridkot | 71 | 44 | 13 | 3 | 1 | 0 | 10 |
| 5. | Fatehgarh Sahib | 82 | 53 | 8 | 6 | 0 | 0 | 15 |
| 6. | Fazilka | 53 | 40 | 6 | 3 | 4 | 0 | 0 |
| 7. | Ferozpur | 102 | 86 | 13 | 1 | 0 | 0 | 2 |
| 8. | Gurdaspur | 96 | 73 | 12 | 0 | 0 | 0 | 11 |
| 9. | Hoshiarpur | 91 | 60 | 7 | 4 | 3 | 0 | 17 |
| 10. | Jalandhar | 110 | 47 | 1 | 1 | 0 | 2 | 59 |
| 11. | Kapurthala | 13 | 10 | 3 | 0 | 0 | 0 | 0 |
| 12. | Ludhiana | 114 | 82 | 16 | 3 | 2 | 0 | 11 |
| 13. | Mansa | 85 | 22 | 6 | 4 | 0 | 0 | 53 |
| 14. | Moga | 39 | 21 | 9 | 4 | 0 | 0 | 5 |
| 15. | Pathankot | 15 | 8 | 0 | 0 | 5 | 0 | 2 |
| 16. | Patiala | 92 | 66 | 11 | 2 | 2 | 0 | 11 |
| 17. | Roopnagar | 92 | 47 | 3 | 0 | 2 | 1 | 39 |
| 18. | S.A.S.Nagar | 145 | 85 | 34 | 1 | 5 | 0 | 20 |
| 19. | Sangrur | 150 | 96 | 19 | 5 | 2 | 0 | 28 |
| 20. | S.B.S.Nagar | 47 | 16 | 6 | 5 | 1 | 1 | 18 |
| 21 | SriMukatsar Sahib | 77 | 49 | 19 | 1 | 2 | 0 | 6 |
| 22. | Tarn Taran | 32 | 26 | 4 | 2 | 0 | 0 | 0 |
| Total | | 1,815 | 1,115 | 251 | 51 | 29 | 5 | 352 |

=== Results by municipality ===
| S.no. | Municipal council | Total seats | Winner | INC | SAD | BJP | AAP | Others |
|---|---|---|---|---|---|---|---|---|
| | Amritsar District | | | | | | | |
| 1. | Ajnala | 15 | | 7 | 8 | 0 | 0 | 0 |
| 2. | Jandiala Guru | 15 | | 10 | 3 | 0 | 0 | 2 |
| 3. | Majitha | 13 | | 2 | 10 | 0 | 0 | 1 |
| 4. | Ramdass | 11 | | 8 | 3 | 0 | 0 | 0 |
| 5. | Rayya | 13 | | 12 | 1 | 0 | 0 | 0 |
| | Barnala District | | | | | | | |
| 6. | Barnala | 31 | | 16 | 4 | 0 | 3 | 8 |
| 7. | Bhadaur | 13 | | 6 | 3 | 0 | 0 | 4 |
| 8. | Dhanaula | 13 | | 0 | 0 | 0 | 0 | 13 |
| 9. | Tapa | 15 | | 6 | 3 | 0 | 0 | 6 |
| | Bathinda District | | | | | | | |
| 10. | Bhucho Mandi | 13 | | 10 | 2 | 0 | 0 | 1 |
| 11. | Bhagta Bhai ka | 13 | | 9 | 3 | 0 | 0 | 1 |
| 12. | Bhai Roopa | 13 | | 8 | 4 | 0 | 0 | 1 |
| 13. | Goniana | 13 | | 7 | 0 | 0 | 0 | 6 |
| 14. | Raman | 15 | | 11 | 2 | 0 | 0 | 2 |
| 15. | Maluka | 11 | | 9 | 2 | 0 | 0 | 0 |
| 16. | Maur | 17 | | 13 | 1 | 0 | 0 | 3 |
| 17. | Nathana | 11 | | 1 | 3 | 0 | 3 | 4 |
| 18. | Kot Shahmir | 13 | | 10 | 1 | 0 | 0 | 2 |
| 19. | Kotha Guru | 11 | | 11 | 0 | 0 | 0 | 0 |
| 20. | Kot Fatta | 11 | | 9 | 0 | 0 | 0 | 2 |
| 21. | Lehra Muhobbat | 7 | | 7 | 0 | 0 | 0 | 0 |
| 22. | Mehraj | 13 | | 10 | 1 | 0 | 0 | 2 |
| 23. | Sangat | 9 | | 2 | 7 | 0 | 0 | 0 |
| | Faridkot District | | | | | | | |
| 24. | Faridkot | 25 | | 16 | 7 | 0 | 1 | 1 |
| 25. | Jaito | 17 | | 7 | 3 | 2 | 1 | 4 |
| 26. | Kotkapura | 29 | | 21 | 3 | 0 | 0 | 5 |
| | Fatehgarh Sahib District | | | | | | | |
| 27. | Bassi Pathana | 16 | | 9 | 2 | 0 | 1 | 4 |
| 28. | Khamano | 13 | | 5 | 1 | 0 | 0 | 7 |
| 28. | Mandi Gobindgarh | 29 | | 19 | 4 | 0 | 2 | 4 |
| 30. | Sirhind FG Sahib | 23 | | 19 | 1 | 0 | 3 | 0 |
| | Fazilka District | | | | | | | |
| 31. | Arniwala | 11 | | 10 | 1 | 0 | 0 | 0 |
| 32. | Fazilka | 25 | | 19 | 0 | 4 | 2 | 0 |
| 33. | Jalalabad | 17 | | 11 | 5 | 0 | 1 | 0 |
| | Ferozepur District | | | | | | | |
| 34. | Ferozepur | 33 | | 33 | 0 | 0 | 0 | 0 |
| 35. | Guru Har Sahai | 13 | | 13 | 0 | 0 | 0 | 0 |
| 36. | Mudki | 13 | | 5 | 8 | 0 | 0 | 0 |
| 37. | Mamdot | 13 | | 9 | 2 | 0 | 0 | 2 |
| 38. | Talwandi Bhai | 13 | | 9 | 3 | 0 | 0 | 1 |
| 39. | Zira | 17 | | 17 | 0 | 0 | 0 | 0 |
| | Gurdaspur District | | | | | | | |
| 40. | Dhariwal | 13 | | 9 | 2 | 0 | 0 | 2 |
| 41. | Dinanagar | 15 | | 14 | 0 | 0 | 0 | 1 |
| 42. | FatehgarhChurian | 13 | | 12 | 1 | 0 | 0 | 0 |
| 43. | Gurdaspur | 29 | | 29 | 0 | 0 | 0 | 0 |
| 44. | Qadian | 15 | | 6 | 7 | 0 | 0 | 2 |
| 45. | Sri Hargobindpur | 11 | | 3 | 1 | 0 | 0 | 7 |
| | Hoshiarpur District | | | | | | | |
| 46. | Dasuya | 15 | | 11 | 0 | 0 | 4 | 0 |
| 47. | Garhdiwala | 11 | | 10 | 0 | 0 | 0 | 1 |
| 48. | Garh Shankar | 13 | | 3 | 0 | 0 | 0 | 10 |
| 49. | Hariana | 11 | | 7 | 1 | 0 | 0 | 3 |
| 50. | Mukerian | 15 | | 11 | 1 | 3 | 0 | 0 |
| 51. | Sham Churasi | 9 | | 4 | 3 | 0 | 0 | 2 |
| 52. | Urmur Tanda | 15 | | 12 | 2 | 0 | 0 | 1 |
| | Jalandhar District | | | | | | | |
| 53. | Adampur | 13 | | 0 | 0 | 0 | 0 | 13 |
| 54. | Alawalpur | 11 | | 0 | 1 | 0 | 0 | 10 |
| 55. | Kartarpur | 15 | | 6 | 0 | 0 | 0 | 9 |
| 56. | Nakodar | 17 | | 9 | 0 | 0 | 0 | 8 |
| 57. | Noormahal | 13 | | 0 | 0 | 1 | 0 | 12 |
| 58. | Phillaur | 15 | | 11 | 0 | 0 | 0 | 4 |
| 59. | Lohian | 13 | | 10 | 0 | 0 | 0 | 3 |
| 60. | Mehatpur | 13 | | 11 | 0 | 0 | 0 | 2 |
| | Kapurthala District | | | | | | | |
| 61. | Sultanpur Lodhi | 13 | | 10 | 3 | 0 | 0 | 0 |
| | Ludhiana District | | | | | | | |
| 62. | Doraha | 15 | | 11 | 2 | 0 | 1 | 1 |
| 63. | Jagraon | 23 | | 17 | 1 | 0 | 0 | 5 |
| 64. | Khanna | 33 | | 19 | 6 | 2 | 2 | 4 |
| 65. | Payal | 11 | | 9 | 1 | 0 | 0 | 1 |
| 66. | Raikot | 15 | | 15 | 0 | 0 | 0 | 0 |
| 67. | Samrala | 15 | | 10 | 5 | 0 | 0 | 0 |
| | Mansa District | | | | | | | |
| 68. | Bareta | 13 | | 0 | 0 | 0 | 0 | 13 |
| 69. | Budhlada | 19 | | 6 | 2 | 0 | 1 | 10 |
| 70. | Joga | 13 | | 0 | 0 | 0 | 0 | 13 (12 CPI) |
| 71. | Boha | 13 | | 2 | 2 | 0 | 0 | 9 |
| 72. | Mansa | 27 | | 14 | 2 | 0 | 3 | 8 |
| | Moga District | | | | | | | |
| 73. | Badhni Kalan | 13 | | 4 | 5 | 0 | 0 | 4 |
| 74. | Kot Isse Khan | 13 | | 9 | 2 | 0 | 1 | 1 |
| 75. | Nihal Singh Wala | 13 | | 4 | 5 | 0 | 4 | 0 |
| | Pathankot District | | | | | | | |
| 76. | Sujanpur | 15 | | 8 | 0 | 6 | 0 | 1 |
| | Patiala District | | | | | | | |
| 77. | Nabha | 23 | | 14 | 6 | 0 | 0 | 3 |
| 78. | Patran | 17 | | 7 | 3 | 0 | 1 | 6 |
| 79. | Rajpura | 31 | | 27 | 1 | 2 | 1 | 0 |
| 80. | samana | 21 | | 18 | 1 | 0 | 0 | 2 |
| | Rupnagar District | | | | | | | |
| 81. | Anandpur Sahib | 13 | | 0 | 0 | 0 | 0 | 13 |
| 82. | Kiratpur Sahib | 11 | | 0 | 1 | 0 | 0 | 10 |
| 83. | Morinda | 15 | | 7 | 0 | 0 | 0 | 8 |
| 84. | Nangal | 19 | | 15 | 0 | 2 | 0 | 2 |
| 85. | Sri Chamkaur Sahib | 13 | | 9 | 0 | 0 | 0 | 3 |
| 86. | Rupnagar | 21 | | 16 | 2 | 0 | 0 | 3 |
| | S.A.S. Nagar District | | | | | | | |
| 87. | Banur | 13 | | 12 | 1 | 0 | 0 | 0 |
| 88. | Dera Bassi | 19 | | 13 | 3 | 1 | 0 | 2 |
| 89. | Kharar | 27 | | 10 | 8 | 0 | 1 | 8 |
| 90. | Kurali | 17 | | 9 | 2 | 1 | 0 | 5 |
| 91. | Larlu | 17 | | 12 | 2 | 0 | 0 | 3 |
| 92. | Nawan Gaon | 21 | | 6 | 10 | 3 | 0 | 2 |
| 93. | Zirakpur | 31 | | 23 | 8 | 0 | 0 | 0 |
| | Sangrur District | | | | | | | |
| 94. | Amargarh | 11 | | 5 | 5 | 0 | 1 | 0 |
| 95. | Ahmedgarh | 17 | | 9 | 3 | 0 | 1 | 4 |
| 96. | Bhawanigarh | 15 | | 13 | 1 | 0 | 0 | 1 |
| 97. | Dhuri | 21 | | 11 | 0 | 0 | 2 | 8 |
| 98. | Lehragaga | 15 | | 9 | 0 | 0 | 0 | 6 |
| 99. | Longowal | 15 | | 9 | 2 | 0 | 0 | 4 |
| 100. | Malerkotla | 33 | | 21 | 8 | 2 | 1 | 1 |
| 101 | Sunam | 23 | | 19 | 0 | 0 | 0 | 4 |
| | S.B.S. Nagar District | | | | | | | |
| 102. | Banga | 15 | | 5 | 3 | 1 | 5 | 1 |
| 103. | Nawan Shehar | 19 | | 11 | 3 | 0 | 0 | 5 |
| 104. | Rahon | 13 | | 7 | 4 | 0 | 0 | 2 |
| | Sri Muktsar Sahib District | | | | | | | |
| 105. | Gidderbaha | 19 | | 18 | 0 | 0 | 0 | 1 |
| 106. | Malout | 27 | | 14 | 9 | 0 | 0 | 4 |
| 107. | Sri Muktsar sahib | 31 | | 17 | 10 | 1 | 2 | 1 |
| | Tarn Taran District | | | | | | | |
| 108. | Patti | 19 | | 15 | 2 | 0 | 2 | 0 |
| 109. | Bhikhiwind | 13 | | 11 | 2 | 0 | 0 | 0 |

== Bypolls ==
| S.no. | District | Corporation/ council/ panchayat | Ward no. | Reservation | Winner |
|---|---|---|---|---|---|
| 1. | Amritsar | Amritsar | 37 | BC | INC |
| 2. | Ludhiana | Mullanpur Dakha | 8 | Gen. | INC |
| 3. | Ludhiana | Sahnewal | 6 | Gen. | SAD |
| 4. | FatehgarhSahib | Amloh | 12 | Gen. | INC |
| 5. | Hoshiarpur | Talwara | 1 | Gen. | INC |
| 6. | Hoshiarpur | Mahilpur | 1 | Women | INC |
| 6. | Hoshiarpur | Mahilpur | 11 | SC | INC |

== Aftermath ==
Indian National Congress won eight out of eight municipal corporations of its own, and nine out of ten independents joined the Indian National Congress in Moga Municipal Corporation.

In municipal councils and nagar panchayats of 109, INC won 78 of its own and 20 with the support of independents, having 98 out of 109. Akali dal won five, and CPI won Joga Council in Mansa. Still, five councils are not clear, and independents have the majority in those five.

== See also ==
- 2023 Punjab, India local elections
- 2021 Barnala district municipal elections
- 2017 Punjab Legislative Assembly election
- 2019 Indian general election in Punjab
- 2022 Punjab Legislative Assembly election
- 2021 elections in India
