= Salt Assembly constituency =

Legislative Assembly constituency in Uttarakhand, India

Coordinates: 29.66°N 79.16°E

Salt
- Constituency No. 49 for the Uttarakhand Legislative Assembly

Constituency details
- Country: India
- Region: North India
- State: Uttarakhand
- District: Almora
- Lok Sabha constituency: Almora
- Total electors: 97,035
- Reservation: None

Member of Legislative Assembly
- 5th Uttarakhand Legislative Assembly
- Incumbent Mahesh Singh Jeena
- Party: Bharatiya Janata Party
- Elected year: 2022

Salt Legislative Assembly constituency is one of the 70 Legislative Assembly constituencies of Uttarakhand state in India.

It is part of Almora district.

== Members of the Legislative Assembly ==
Election	Member	Party
2002	Ranjeet Singh	Indian National Congress
2007	Ranjeet Singh	Indian National Congress
2012	Surendra Singh Jeena	Bharatiya Janata Party
2017	Surendra Singh Jeena	Bharatiya Janata Party
2021^	Mahesh Singh Jeena	Bharatiya Janata Party
2022	Mahesh Singh Jeena	Bharatiya Janata Party

^By poll

== Election results ==
=== 2027 Assembly election ===
2027 Uttarakhand Legislative Assembly election: Salt
Party	Candidate	Votes	%	±%
INC				
BJP				
NOTA	None of the above			
Majority				
Turnout				
gain from		Swing		

=== Assembly Election 2022 ===
2022 Uttarakhand Legislative Assembly election: Salt
Party	Candidate	Votes	%	±%
BJP	Mahesh Singh Jeena	22,393	49.65%	▼3.22
INC	Ranjeet Singh Rawat	18,705	41.47%	▼0.04
UKD	Rakesh Nath	1,292	2.86%	New
AAP	Suresh Bisht	628	1.39%	New
Independent	Surendra Singh Jeena	540	1.20%	New
Independent	Lalit Mohan Singh	442	0.98%	New
NOTA	None of the above	331	0.73%	▼1.01
UKPP	Jagdish Chandra	327	0.73%	▼0.47
BSP	Adv. Bhole Shankar Arya	324	0.72%	New
Margin of victory		3,688	8.18%	▼3.18
Turnout		45,101	46.05%	▲3.46
Registered electors		97,946		▲0.82
BJP hold		Swing	▼3.22	

=== Assembly By-election 2021 ===
2021 Uttarakhand Legislative Assembly by-election: Salt
Party	Candidate	Votes	%	±%
BJP	Mahesh Singh Jeena	21,874	52.87%	▲3.87
INC	Ganga Pancholi	17,177	41.52%	▼0.89
NOTA	None of the above	721	1.74%	New
Independent	Surendra Singh	620	1.50%	New
UKPP	Jagdish Chandra	493	1.19%	▲0.58
Independent	Shiv Singh Rawat	466	1.13%	New
Independent	Pan Singh	346	0.84%	New
	Nand Kishor	209	0.51%	New
Margin of victory		4,697	11.35%	▲4.76
Turnout		41,373	42.70%	▼3.42
Registered electors		97,150		▲1.48
BJP hold		Swing	▲3.87	

=== Assembly Election 2017 ===
2017 Uttarakhand Legislative Assembly election: Salt
Party	Candidate	Votes	%	±%
BJP	Surendra Singh Jeena	21,581	49.00%	▼2.03
INC	Ganga Pancholi	18,677	42.41%	▲2.97
NOTA	None of the above	812	1.84%	New
Independent	Bhuvan Joshi	669	1.52%	New
BSP	Adv. Bhole Shankar Arya	664	1.51%	▲0.15
Uttarakhand Kranti Dal (Democratic)	Ganga Devi	459	1.04%	New
UKPP	Narayan Singh	268	0.61%	▼0.84
Independent	Mahipal Singh	262	0.59%	New
Margin of victory		2,904	6.59%	▼5.00
Turnout		44,044	46.01%	▼5.98
Registered electors		95,735		
BJP hold		Swing	▼2.03	

=== Assembly Election 2012 ===
2012 Uttarakhand Legislative Assembly election: Salt
Party	Candidate	Votes	%	±%
BJP	Surendra Singh Jeena	23,956	51.03%	▲33.46
INC	Ranjeet Singh Rawat	18,512	39.44%	▼4.21
Independent	Bhuvan Joshi	822	1.75%	New
URM	Dinesh Chandra Singh	784	1.67%	New
CPI(ML)L	Purushottam Sharma	741	1.58%	▼0.25
UKPP	Narayan Singh	681	1.45%	New
BSP	Anoop Ram Kohali	635	1.35%	▼3.66
UKD	Pan Singh	485	1.03%	▼2.82
RLD	Bhupendar	285	0.61%	New
Margin of victory		5,444	11.60%	▼8.84
Turnout		46,942	51.98%	▼5.70
Registered electors		90,303		
BJP gain from INC		Swing	▲7.39	

=== Assembly Election 2007 ===
2007 Uttarakhand Legislative Assembly election: Salt
Party	Candidate	Votes	%	±%
INC	Ranjeet Singh Rawat	15,190	43.64%	▲2.07
Independent	Dinesh Singh	8,075	23.20%	New
BJP	Pramod Kumar	6,115	17.57%	▼11.68
BSP	Govind Ram	1,743	5.01%	▲1.29
UKD	Bhagat Singh	1,342	3.86%	▼2.35
BJSH	Nandaballabh	1,040	2.99%	New
CPI(ML)L	Anand Singh Negi	638	1.83%	▼1.38
Independent	Anand Singh	399	1.15%	New
Uttarakhand Sanskriti Parishad	Narayan Singh	264	0.76%	New
Margin of victory		7,115	20.44%	▲8.13
Turnout		34,806	57.72%	▲9.25
Registered electors		60,337		▲1.34
INC hold		Swing	▲2.07	

=== Assembly Election 2002 ===
2002 Uttaranchal Legislative Assembly election: Salt
Party	Candidate	Votes	%	±%
INC	Ranjeet Singh Rawat	11,988	41.57%	New
BJP	Mohan Singh S/O Diwan Singh	8,436	29.25%	New
UKD	Khimanand	1,789	6.20%	New
Independent	Narayan Dutt	1,480	5.13%	New
BSP	Dinesh Singh	1,072	3.72%	New
Independent	Kedar Dutt Joshi	937	3.25%	New
CPI(ML)L	Anand Singh Negi	926	3.21%	New
Bharatiya Berozgar Mazdoor Kisan Dal	Mohan Singh S/O An Singh	755	2.62%	New
Independent	Jagat Pal Singh	695	2.41%	New
RLD	Diwan Singh	268	0.93%	New
SAP	Chandan Singh	267	0.93%	New
Margin of victory		3,552	12.32%	
Turnout		28,840	48.46%	
Registered electors		59,537		
INC win (new seat)				

== See also ==
- List of constituencies of the Uttarakhand Legislative Assembly
- Almora district
