= Mahesh Singh Jeena =

Indian politician

Member of Uttarakhand Legislative Assembly
- Incumbent
- Assumed office 2 May 2021
- Preceded by: Surendra Singh Jeena
- Constituency: Salt

Personal details
- Party: Bharatiya Janata Party
- Education: B.Com.
- Alma mater: Delhi University
- Profession: Businessman

Mahesh Singh Jeena is an Indian politician. He was elected to the Uttarakhand Legislative Assembly from Salt Assembly constituency in the 2021 Uttarakhand legislative assembly by-election and 2022 Uttarakhand Legislative Assembly election as a member of the Bharatiya Janata Party. He defeated Ganga Pancholi of Indian National Congress by 4,600 votes in 2021 By-elections. Elections happened due to Mahesh Singh Jeena's elder brother Surendra Singh Jeena, who was undergoing treatment for COVID-19 at a hospital in New Delhi, who died early on 12 November 2020. He was re-elected in 2022, defeating former mla Ranjeet Singh Rawat.

== Electoral performance ==
Election	Constituency	Party	Result	Votes %	Opposition Candidate	Opposition Party	Opposition vote %	Ref
2022	Salt	BJP	Won	49.65%	Ranjeet Singh Rawat	INC	41.47%	
2021 By-election	Salt	BJP	Won	52.87%	Ganga Pancholi	INC	41.52%	0
