= Avinash Rai Khanna =

Indian politician

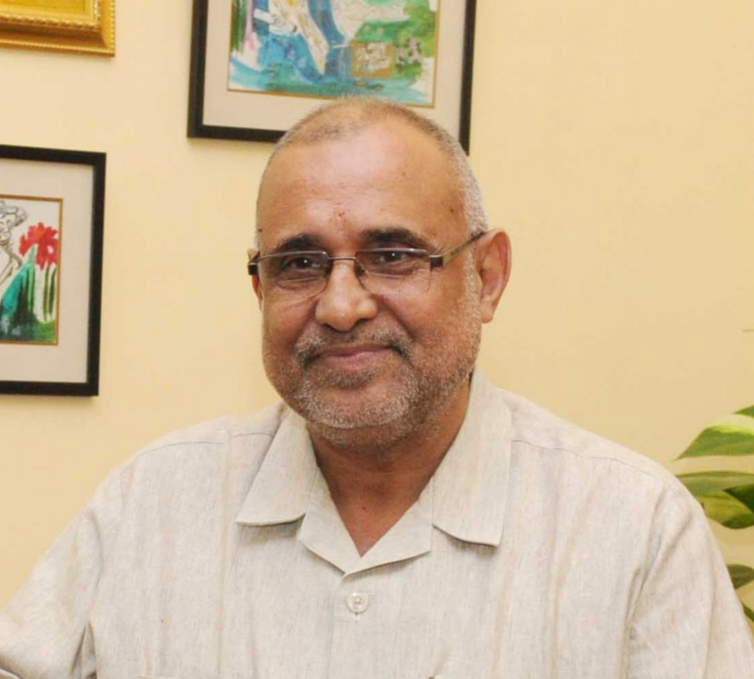

Member of Parliament, Rajya Sabha
- In office 10 April 2010 – 9 April 2016
- Succeeded by: Shwait Malik
- Constituency: Punjab

Member of Parliament, Lok Sabha
- In office 2004–2009
- Preceded by: Charanjit Singh
- Succeeded by: Santosh Chowdhary
- Constituency: Hoshiarpur

Member of Punjab Legislative Assembly
- In office 2002–2004
- Preceded by: Shingara Ram
- Succeeded by: Luv Kumar Goldy
- Constituency: Garhshankar

Personal details
- Born: 30 December 1960 (age 65) Garhshankar, Punjab, India
- Party: Bharatiya Janata Party
- Spouse: Minakhshi Khanna (m. 1985)
- Children: Shikha Khanna; Piyush Khanna
- As of 22 February, 2022

Avinash Rai Khanna (born 30 December 1960) is a Vice Chairman, Indian Red Cross Society and Vice President of Bhartiya Janta Party. He is also a BJP In-charge of Himacal Pradesh. Earlier, he served as ex member of Rajya Sabha and was also a member of the 14th Lok Sabha of India. He represented the Hoshiarpur constituency of Punjab. He was elected as an MLA from Garhshankar in 2002. In 2003, he was also elected as a State President B.J.P. Punjab. After that he was elected Member of Parliament from Hoshiarpur Constituency in 2004. Under his leadership, for the first time in Punjab B.J.P. got 19 seats out of 23 in Assembly elections in 2007 and played a major role in formation of Akali government in Punjab. During his five-year tenure as an M.P., he has asked 270 questions and participated in 116 debates.

In 2009 Parliamentary elections his Hoshiarpur seat was reserved. He became Member, Punjab State Human Rights Commission. He served as a member for around 10 months. In 2010, he was elected to Rajya Sabha and was also appointed Chief Whip of the party in the Rajya Sabha.
