= Batala Municipal Corporation =

City governing body in India

Type
- Type: Local Body Government

History
- Established: 2019
- Preceded by: Batala Municipal Council

Leadership
- Minister in charge: Harjot Singh Bains, AAP since 13 May 2026
- Mayor: Bhupinder Singh Bajwa, AAP since 11 June 2026
- Senior deputy mayor: Neelam Chouhan, AAP since 11 June 2026
- Deputy mayor: Sukhraj Kaur, AAP since 11 June 2026
- Municipal commissioner: Gursimran Singh Dhillon since 28 November 2025

Structure
- Seats: 51 (50 elected councillors+1 Ex-Officio)
- Political groups: Government (31): AAP (30) (Councillors); AAP (1) (Ex-Officio); Opposition (20): INC (18); BJP (2)
- Length of term: 5 Years

Elections
- First election: 14 February 2021
- Last election: 26 May 2026
- Next election: 2031

Website
- mcbatala.co.in

The Batala Municipal Corporation is a municipal corporation which administers the city of Batala, Punjab. It has 50 members elected with a first-past-the-post voting system and 1 ex-officio member which is MLA for Batala. In 2019 Government of Punjab decided to upgrade it into Municipal Corporation, earlier it was a municipal council.

== Mayor ==
=== Mayor of Batala ===
The Mayor of Batala is the elected chief of the Municipal Corporation of Batala. The mayor is the first citizen of the city. The role is largely ceremonial as the real powers are vested in the Municipal Commissioner. The mayor plays a decorative role of representing and upholding the dignity of the city and a functional role in deliberating over the discussions in the corporation. First election were held in February 2021 and Congeess got majority in the house, Sukhdeep Singh Teja elected the first Mayor and completed 5 years term. On the completion of tenure of 1 corporation, elections were delayed because of Court’s involvement. Second election were held with delay of Two months after the expiry of First Corporation. Aam Aadmi Party won the elected and First time elected Councillor, Bhupinder Singh Bajwa elected Mayor.

=== Additional charge ===
Under sections 407 and 407A of the Punjab Municipal Corporation Act 1976, the government of Punjab can appoint a person who will carry out the duties of the corporation or mayor until the new house is constituted. Most of the time, Government of Punjab appoints a Municipal Commissioner to carry out the mayor's duties. When Batala Municipal Council upgraded to Corporation in 2019, the powers of the mayor were given to Municipal Commissioner Balwinder Singh until the first corporation was elected in 2021. The second time, when the first house's tenure ended, but elections were delayed, power was given to Municipal Commissioner Gursimran Singh Dhillon.

=== List of Mayors ===
Key

- Additional Charge (Municipal Commissioner)

Color keys for the party of the Mayor

- Aam Aadmi Party (1)
- Indian National Congress (1)

S. No.	Name (Ward No.)	Took office	Left office	Tenure	Party	Corporation (Tenure)	Election	Ref.
(i)	Balwinder Singh	18 November 2019	19 April 2021	1 year, 152 days	-			
1	Sukhdeep Singh Teja (30th)	19 April 2021	18 April 2026	4 years, 364 days	Indian National Congress	1st (19 April 2021 to 18 April 2026)	2021	
(ii)	Gursimran Singh Dhillon	18 April 2026	11 June 2026	54 days	-			
2	Bhupinder Singh Bajwa (5th)	11 June 2026	Incumbent	101 days	Aam Aadmi Party	2nd (11 June 2026 - Present)	2026	

== Deputy mayors ==
Senior Deputy Mayor

S. No.	Name (Ward No.)	Took office	Left office	Tenure	Party	Corporation
1	Sunil Kumar Sareen (42nd)	19 April 2021	18 April 2026	4 years, 364 days	Indian National Congress	1st
2	Neelam Chouhan (33rd)	11 June 2026	Incumbent	101 days	Aam Aadmi Party	2nd

Deputy Mayor

S. No.	Name (Ward No.)	Took office	Left office	Tenure	Party	Corporation
1	Chandra Kanta (45th)	19 April 2021	18 April 2026	4 years, 364 days	Indian National Congress	1st
2	Sukhraj Kaur (32nd)	11 June 2026	Incumbent	101 days	Aam Aadmi Party	2nd

== Municipal Commissioner ==
Every municipal corporation in India is administratively headed by a municipal commissioner. While a Mayor is elected to serve as the ceremonial head of a municipal corporation, a municipal commissioner is appointed by the state government from the Indian Administrative Service or Provincial Civil Service (PCS) to head the administrative staff of the municipal corporation, implement the decisions of the corporation, and prepare its annual budget.

=== Keys ===
- ^{t} Transferred
- ^{ss} Suspended

S. No.	Name	Took office	Left office	Tenure	Ref.	Additional Charge of Mayor
1	Balwinder Singh (PCS)	18 November 2019	8 September 2021^{[t]}	1 year, 294 days		18 November 2019 - 19 April 2021
2	Jagwinderjit Singh (PCS)	8 September 2021	24 May 2022^{[t]}	258 days		
3	Shayari Malhotra (PCS)	24 May 2022	24 September 2024^{[t]}	1 year, 336 days		
4	Vikramjit Singh Panthey (PCS)	24 September 2024	22 November 2025 ^{[ss]}	1 year, 59 days		
5	Gursimran Singh Dhillon (PCS)	28 November 2025	Incumbent	296 days		18 April 2026 - 11 June 2026

== Ward Reservation ==
- General wards (17/50) - 1, 3, 5, 9, 11, 13, 15, 19, 21, 25, 27, 29, 31, 33, 35, 37 and 41.
- Reserved for Schedule Caste (7/50) - 7, 17, 23, 28, 39, 45 and 47.
- Reserved for Women (19/50) - 4, 10, 12, 14, 18, 20, 22, 26, 30, 32, 34, 36, 38, 40, 42, 43, 44, 49 and 50.
- Reserved for Schedule Caste Women (5/50) - 2, 6, 8, 24 and 48.
- Reserved for Backward Class (2/50) - 16 and 46.

== Councilors ==
Following is the list of Incumbent Councilors

Color Key for the Party of the Councilor

- AAP-Aam Aadmi Party
- BJP-Bharatiya Janata Party
- INC-Indian National Congress

Other keys

- G - General
- SC - Schedule Caste
- W - Women
- SCW - Schedule Caste Women
- BC - Backward Caste

Ward number	Councilor	Party
1 (G)	Bhupinder Singh Wahla	INC
2 (SCW)	Rajwant Kaur	AAP
3 (G)	Ayadwinder Singh	AAP
4 (W)	Amanpreet Kaur	AAP
5 (G)	Bhupinder Singh Bajwa (Mayor)	AAP
6 (SCW)	Suman	INC
7 (SC)	Rajkumar	INC
8 (SCW)	Veerpal	AAP
9 (G)	Rajdeep Singh	AAP
10 (W)	Manjit Kaur	AAP
11 (G)	Ramandeep Singh	AAP
12 (W)	Jasbir Kaur	AAP
13 (G)	Manjit Kaur	INC
14 (W)	Prabhjot Kaur	INC
15 (G)	Satnam Singh	AAP
16 (BC)	Bikramjit Singh	INC
17 (SC)	Vajinder Kumar	INC
18 (W)	Jagpreet Kaur	AAP
19 (G)	Anu Bala	AAP
20 (W)	Gurmeet Kaur	AAP
21 (G)	Gurinder Singh	AAP
22 (W)	Ramandeep Kaur	AAP
23 (SC)	Davinder Singh	AAP
24 (SCW)	Anju Bala	AAP
25 (G)	Manjit Singh	AAP
26 (W)	Khushbu Ohri	AAP
27 (G)	Sunil Chachowalia	BJP
28 (SC)	Neru Bhatti	BJP
29 (G)	Shaweta	AAP
30 (W)	Amanpreet Kaur	INC
31 (G)	Gourav Seth	INC
32 (W)	Sukhraj Kaur (Deputy Mayor)	AAP
33 (G)	Neelam Chouhan (Senior Deputy Mayor)	AAP
34 (W)	Kamaljit	AAP
35 (G)	Shashi Chanda	INC
36 (W)	Ritu	AAP
37 (G)	Davinder Singh	INC
38 (W)	Harveen Kaur	AAP
39 (SC)	Dheeraj Kumar	AAP
40 (W)	Rajni Soni	INC
41 (G)	Sunita Rani	AAP
42 (W)	Pinki	INC
43 (W)	Bachno	AAP
44 (W)	Mandeep Raj Kaur	AAP
45 (SC)	Vijay Kumar	INC
46 (BC)	Ravinder Tuli	INC
47 (SC)	Vijay Kumar	AAP
48 (SCW)	Sonia	INC
49 (W)	Gurjeet Kaur	AAP
50 (W)	Mamta John	INC

== Ex-officio member ==
According to Section 5 (1) (ii) of the Punjab Municipal Corporation Act 1976 ex-officio members comprising the members of Punjab legislative assembly representing the constituencies in which the city or any part there of falls.

Thus the person who represents the Batala Assembly Constituency in the Punjab Legislative Assembly is the ex-officio member of corporation.

Ex-officio member has voting right on par with elected members during the election of Mayor or Deputy mayors in corporation. His vote becomes crucial when a single party lacks required numbers of votes to secure mayor's post or when parties get equal numbers of elected ward members.

Color key for the party of ex-officio member

- Shiromani Akali Dal
- Aam Aadmi Party

List of ex-officio members

S. No.	Name	Party	Tenure			Elected to assembly	Corporation
1	Lakhbir Singh Lodhinangal	Shiromani Akali Dal	19 April 2021	11 March 2022	326 days	2017	1st
2	Amansher Singh Kalsi	Aam Aadmi Party	17 March 2022	18 April 2026	4 years, 32 days	2022	1st
2	Amansher Singh Kalsi	Aam Aadmi Party	11 June 2026	Incumbent	101 days	2022	2nd

== 1st election 2021 ==
=== 2021 Batala Municipal Corporation election ===
After the up gradation to Corporation the first election for all 50 wards were held on 14 February 2021 and result was declared on 17 February. Total 279 candidates stood for elections. The election programme was as follow:-

S. No.	Programme	Dates	Day
1	Last Date for filing nominations	3 February 2021	Wednesday
2	Date for the scrutiny of nominations	4 February 2021	Thursday
3	Last date to withdraw nominations	5 February 2021	Friday
4	Date of Voting	14 February 2021	Sunday
5	Date of Counting	17 February 2021	Wednesday
6	Date by which election shall be completed	20 February 2021	Saturday

=== Result ===
Party	Wards won	Contested
Indian National Congress	36	50
Shiromani Akali Dal	06	47
Bhartiya Janata Party	04	34
Aam Aadmi Party	03	49
Independent	01	92
Bahujan Samaj Party	00	7
Total	50	279
Vote turnout	74,961	65%
Registered voters	1,15,325	

=== Elected councilors ===
Color Key for the Party of the Councilor

- AAP-Aam Aadmi Party
- BJP-Bharatiya Janata Party
- INC-Indian National Congress
- SAD-Shiromani Akali Dal
- Independent

Ward number	Councilor	Party
1	Chanchaljit Kaur	INC
2	Joginder Singh	INC
3	Karanpal Kaur	INC
4	Suchha Singh	INC
5	Kulwinder Kaur	INC
6	Heera Lal	SAD
7	Pooja	INC
8	Kastoori Lal	INC
9	Reenu	INC
10	Puran Singh	SAD
11	Kanwalpreet Kaur	INC
12	Sanjiv Kumar	INC
13	Manjit Kaur	AAP
14	Gurpreet Singh	INC
15	Pooja Sharma	INC
15	Pooja Sharma	BJP (Note: On 23 May 2024, Pooja Sharma joined BJP)
16	Bikramjit Singh	INC
17	Manjit Kaur	SAD
18	Jagir Singh Khokhar	INC
19	Gurdish Kaur	INC
20	Harsimran Singh Heera	BJP
21	Harinder Kaur	INC
22	Narinder Pal Singh	INC
23	Sonia	INC
24	Balwant Singh (Note: Died in office)	INC
24	Satnam Singh (Note: Elected in bypoll on 21 December 2024.)	AAP
25	Rawinder Kaur	SAD
26	Harnek Singh	INC
27	Sudha Mahajan	BJP
27	Sudha Mahajan	SAD (Note: On 14 December 2023 Sudha Mahajan and Suman Handa joined Shiromani Akali Dal)
28	Rakesh Bhatti	Independent
29	Annu Agarwal	INC
30	Sukhdeep Singh Teja (Mayor)	INC
31	Kamani Seth	INC
32	Anil Kumar Sekhri	INC
33	Monika Sekhri	INC
34	Navin Nayyar Sekhri	INC
35	Sashi Chanda	INC
36	Sukhdev Singh Bajwa	INC
37	Gurpreet Kaur	INC
38	Harinder Singh	INC
39	Reena	INC
40	Chandar Mohan	INC
41	Madhu Mahajan	BJP
42	Sunil Kumar Sareen (Senior Deputy Mayor)	INC
43	Suman Handa	BJP
43	Suman Handa	SAD (Note: On 14 December 2023 Sudha Mahajan and Suman Handa joined Shiromani Akali Dal)
44	Prabhjot Singh Chatha	INC
45	Chandra Kanta (Deputy Mayor)	INC
46	Ravinder Tuli	AAP
47	Neelam Kumari	SAD
48	Sardool Singh	AAP
49	Rajwinder Kaur	INC
50	Manjit Kaur	SAD

== 2nd election 2026 ==
=== 2026 Batala Municipal Corporation election ===
S. No.	Programme	Dates	Days
1	Last Date for filing nominations	16 May 2026	Saturday
2	Date for the scrutiny of nominations	18 May 2026	Monday
3	Last date to withdraw nominations	19 May 2026	Tuesday
4	Date of Voting	26 May 2026	Tuesday
5	Date of Counting	29 May 2026	Friday
6	Date by which election shall be completed	1 June 2026	Monday

=== Result ===
Party	Contested	Wards Won	Change	Votes	Voteshare
Aam Aadmi Party	50	30	▲27	29,999	42.54%
Indian National Congress	49	18	▼18	27,510	39.01%
Bhartiya Janata Party	22	2	▼2	4,563	6.47%
Shiromani Akali Dal	22	0	▼6	2,447	3.47%
Independent	41	0	▼1	2,997	4.25%
Bahujan Samaj Party	1	0	0	21	0.03%
NOTA				2,595	3.68%
Invalid/Rejected/Blank votes				388	0.55%
Total	185	50			
Vote turnout	70,520	58.55%	▼6.45%		
Registered voters	1,20,443				

=== Elected Councillor ===
Other keys

- G - General
- SC - Schedule Caste
- W - Women
- SCW - Schedule Caste Women
- BC - Backward Caste

Ward number	Councilor	Party
1 (G)	Bhupinder Singh Wahla	INC
2 (SCW)	Rajwant Kaur	AAP
3 (G)	Ayadwinder Singh	AAP
4 (W)	Amanpreet Kaur	AAP
5 (G)	Bhupinder Singh Bajwa (Mayor)	AAP
6 (SCW)	Suman	INC
7 (SC)	Rajkumar	INC
8 (SCW)	Veerpal	AAP
9 (G)	Rajdeep Singh	AAP
10 (W)	Manjit Kaur	AAP
11 (G)	Ramandeep Singh	AAP
12 (W)	Jasbir Kaur	AAP
13 (G)	Manjit Kaur	INC
14 (W)	Prabhjot Kaur	INC
15 (G)	Satnam Singh	AAP
16 (BC)	Bikramjit Singh	INC
17 (SC)	Vajinder Kumar	INC
18 (W)	Jagpreet Kaur	AAP
19 (G)	Anu Bala	AAP
20 (W)	Gurmeet Kaur	AAP
21 (G)	Gurinder Singh	AAP
22 (W)	Ramandeep Kaur	AAP
23 (SC)	Davinder Singh	AAP
24 (SCW)	Anju Bala	AAP
25 (G)	Manjit Singh	AAP
26 (W)	Khushbu Ohri	AAP
27 (G)	Sunil Chachowalia	BJP
28 (SC)	Neru Bhatti	BJP
29 (G)	Shaweta	AAP
30 (W)	Amanpreet Kaur	INC
31 (G)	Gourav Seth	INC
32 (W)	Sukhraj Kaur (Deputy Mayor)	AAP
33 (G)	Neelam Chouhan (Senior Deputy Mayor)	AAP
34 (W)	Kamaljit	AAP
35 (G)	Shashi Chanda	INC
36 (W)	Ritu	AAP
37 (G)	Davinder Singh	INC
38 (W)	Harveen Kaur	AAP
39 (SC)	Dheeraj Kumar	AAP
40 (W)	Rajni Soni	INC
41 (G)	Sunita Rani	AAP
42 (W)	Pinki	INC
43 (W)	Bachno	AAP
44 (W)	Mandeep Raj Kaur	AAP
45 (SC)	Vijay Kumar	INC
46 (BC)	Ravinder Tuli	INC
47 (SC)	Vijay Kumar	AAP
48 (SCW)	Sonia	INC
49 (W)	Gurjeet Kaur	AAP
50 (W)	Mamta John	INC

== See also ==
- 2021 Punjab, India local elections
- Elections in Punjab
