= Surendra Singh Jeena =

Indian politician (1969–2020)

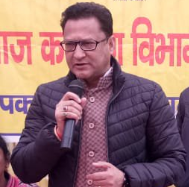

Member of Legislative Assembly Salt
- In office 30 January 2012 – 12 November 2020
- Preceded by: Ranjeet Singh Rawat
- Succeeded by: Mahesh Singh Jeena

Member of Legislative Assembly Bhikiyasain
- In office 21 February 2007 – 30 January 2012
- Preceded by: Pratap Singh Bisht
- Succeeded by: Constituency abolished

Personal details
- Born: 8 December 1969
- Died: 12 November 2020 (aged 50) Sir Ganga Ram hospital, Delhi, India
- Party: Bharatiya Janata Party

Surendra Singh Jeena (8 December 1969 – 12 November 2020) was an Indian politician and member of the Bharatiya Janata Party.

== Biography ==
Jeena was a member of the Uttarakhand Legislative Assembly from the Salt constituency in Almora district at the time of his death. He made it through to legislative assembly for the third time in a row. He was also the chairman of Kumaon Mandal Vikas Nigam (KMVN) in his first term. In 2007, he was elected as a member of legislative assembly from Bhikiyasain constituency. In his second term he won 2012 legislative election from Salt constituency. He was re-elected from Salt assembly constituency in 2017.

MLA from Salt in Almora district, Surendra Singh Jeena, who was undergoing treatment for COVID-19 at a hospital in New Delhi, died from the virus early on 12 November 2020, a party leader said.
