= Shwait Malik =

Indian politician

President, BJP Punjab
- In office 6 April 2018 – 17 January 2020
- Preceded by: Vijay Sampla
- Succeeded by: Ashwani Kumar Sharma

Member of Parliament, Rajya Sabha
- In office 9 April 2016 – 9 April 2022
- Preceded by: Avinash Rai Khanna
- Succeeded by: Sanjeev Arora
- Constituency: Punjab

Personal details
- Born: 29 April 1963 (age 63) Amritsar, Punjab, India
- Party: Bharatiya Janata Party
- Spouse: Reema Malik (m. 1986)
- Children: 2
- Education: Thapar University- B. E.
- Occupation: Politician

Shwait Malik (born 29 April 1963) is an Indian politician belonging to the Bharatiya Janata Party. On 10 March 2016 he was the party's choice to represent Punjab in the Rajya Sabha, the Upper House of Indian Parliament. On 31 March 2018 he was appointed as Punjab BJP Chief. He is currently serving as the State Executive Member of BJP Punjab.

Shwait Malik has also served in the capacity of Mayor for the city of Amritsar, Punjab, India.
