= Amritsar Municipal Corporation =

Local civic body in Amritsar, Punjab, India

Type
- Type: Municipal Corporation

History
- Preceded by: Amritsar Municipal Council

Leadership
- Mayor: Jatinder Singh, AAP since 27 January 2025
- Senior Deputy Mayor: Priyanka Sharma, AAP since 27 January 2025
- Junior Deputy Mayor: Anita Rani, AAP since 27 January 2025

Structure
- Seats: 85
- Political groups: Government (33): AAP (33); Opposition (52): INC (39); BJP (8); SAD (4); IND (1); Ex-officios: TBA
- Length of term: 5 years

Elections
- First election: 1991
- Last election: 21 December 2024
- Next election: 2029

Website
- Official website

The Amritsar Municipal Corporation is a nagar nigam (municipal corporation) which administers the city of Amritsar, Punjab. It has 85 members elected with a first-past-the-post voting system and 5 ex-officio members which are MLA for [Assembly Constituency members]. The corporation was founded 1977, and the first elections were held in 1991.

== List of Mayors ==
The mayor of Amritsar is the elected chief of the Municipal Corporation of Amritsar. The mayor is the first citizen of the city. The role is largely ceremonial as the real powers are vested in the Municipal Commissioner. The mayor plays a decorative role of representing and upholding the dignity of the city and a functional role in deliberating over the discussions in the corporation.

S. No.	Name	Took office	Left office	Tenure	Party	Ward No.	Ref.
1	Om Parkash Soni	25 June 1991	18 June 1996	4 years, 359 days	INC		
2	Subash Sharma	28 May 1997	18 October 2000	3 years, 143 days	BJP		
3	Brij Mohan Kapur	18 October 2000	27 April 2002	1 year, 191 days	BJP		
4	Sunil Dutti	15 June 2002	2007	5 years	INC		
5	Shwait Malik	6 September 2007	2012	5 years	BJP		
6	Bakshi Ram Arora	19 September 2012	2017	5 years	BJP		
7	Karamjit Singh Rintu	23 January 2018	27 January 2025	8 years, 127 days	AAP		
8	Jatinder Singh	27 January 2025	Incumbent	1 year, 125 days	AAP	26	

== List of deputy mayors ==
=== Senior Deputy Mayor ===
S. No.	Name	Took office	Left office	Tenure	Party	Ward No.	Ref.
1	Priyanka Sharma	27 January 2025	Incumbent	175 days	AAP	11	

=== Junior Deputy Mayor ===
S. No.	Name	Took office	Left office	Tenure	Party	Ward No.	Ref.
1	Anita Rani	27 January 2025	Incumbent	175 days	AAP	67	

== Current members ==
Amritsar Municipal Corporation has a total of 85 members or councillors, who are directly elected after a term of 5 years. The council is led by the Mayor. The latest elections were held in 21 December 2024. The current mayor of Amritsar is Jatinder Singh of the Aam Aadmi Party. The current senior deputy mayor and deputy mayor are Priyanka Sharma and Anita Devi of the Aam Aadmi Party respectively.

Mayor: Jatinder Singh
Senior Deputy Mayor: Priyanka Sharma
Junior Deputy Mayor: Anita Rani
Ward No.	Name of Councillor	Party	Remarks
1	Kuljit Kaur	Aam Aadmi Party	
2	Amarjit Singh	Aam Aadmi Party	
3	Navdeep Kaur	Indian National Congress	
4	Mandeep Singh Aujla	Aam Aadmi Party	Elected as Independent councillor; later joined AAP
5	Kriti Arora	Bharatiya Janata Party	
6	Amandeep Aery	Bharatiya Janata Party	
7	Kajal Devi	Aam Aadmi Party	
8	Balwinder Singh	Aam Aadmi Party	
9	Shobit Kaur	Indian National Congress	
10	Shruti Vij	Bharatiya Janata Party	
11	Priyanka Sharma	Aam Aadmi Party	
12	Narinder Singh	Indian National Congress	
13	Gurwinder Kaur	Aam Aadmi Party	
14	Rajkanwal Preetpal Singh Sandhu	Indian National Congress	
15	Rama Devi	Bharatiya Janata Party	
16	Sandeep Sharma	Indian National Congress	
17	Anita Kumari	Indian National Congress	
18	Navdeep Singh	Indian National Congress	
19	Navjeet Kaur	Aam Aadmi Party	
20	Gurinder Singh	Indian National Congress	
21	Kulwinder Kaur	Aam Aadmi Party	
22	Sujinder Bidlan	Indian National Congress	
23	Kulwinder Kaur	Indian National Congress	
24	Satnam Singh Sabha	Indian National Congress	
25	Monika Sharma	Indian National Congress	
26	Jatinder Singh	Aam Aadmi Party	
27	Preet Kaur	Aam Aadmi Party	Elected as BJP councillor, later joined AAP
28	Saurabh Madaan Mithu	Indian National Congress	
29	Shweta Devi	Indian National Congress	
30	Avtar Singh	Shiromani Akali Dal	
31	Sukhbir Kaur	Aam Aadmi Party	
32	Jagmeet Singh Ghulli	Aam Aadmi Party	Elected as Independent councillor; later joined AAP
33	Ashnoor Kaur	Aam Aadmi Party	
34	Amritpal Singh	Indian National Congress	
35	Amarji Kaur	Bharatiya Janata Party	
36	Ashok Kumar	Aam Aadmi Party	
37	Gurjit Kaur	Aam Aadmi Party	
38	Bhagwant Singh	Aam Aadmi Party	
39	Manpreet Kaur	Aam Aadmi Party	
40	Gurwinder Singh	Aam Aadmi Party	
41	Sukhwinder Kaur	Indian National Congress	
42	Gagandeep Singh	Indian National Congress	
43	Inderjit Singh	Shiromani Akali Dal	
44	Jaswinder Singh Gill	Indian National Congress	
45	Sukhbir Kaur	Indian National Congress	
46	Navpreet Singh	Indian National Congress	
47	Kiranjit Kaur	Aam Aadmi Party	
48	Ashwani Kumar	Indian National Congress	
49	Ritu Kundra	Indian National Congress	
50	Ritu Devi	Aam Aadmi Party	
51	Sarita Devi	Indian National Congress	
52	Vikas Soni	Indian National Congress	
53	Komal Shah	Indian National Congress	
54	Amit Kumar	Indian National Congress	
55	Kulbir Kaur	Indian National Congress	
56	Varinder Vicky Datta	Aam Aadmi Party	
57	Manju Mehra Pappal	Indian National Congress	
58	Jarnail Singh	Aam Aadmi Party	
59	Gurmeet Kaur	Indian National Congress	
60	Gaurav Gill	Bharatiya Janata Party	
61	Rajni Devi	Bharatiya Janata Party	
62	Sameer Dutta	Indian National Congress	
63	Usha Rani	Aam Aadmi Party	Elected as Independent councillor; later joined AAP
64	Nitu Tangri	Independent	
65	Neeraj Chaudhary	Indian National Congress	
66	Virat Devgan	Aam Aadmi Party	
67	Anita Devi	Aam Aadmi Party	Elected as Independent councillor; later joined AAP
68	Vikas Gill	Bharatiya Janata Party	
69	Gurpreet Kaur	Indian National Congress	
70	Vijay Kumar Bhagat	Aam Aadmi Party	Elected as Independent councillor; later joined AAP
71	Surjit Kaur	Aam Aadmi Party	
72	Avtar Singh	Indian National Congress	Elected as INC councillor; later joined AAP, then returned to INC
73	Kuldeep Singh	Indian National Congress	
74	Paramjeet Kaur Dhillon	Shiromani Akali Dal	
75	Kashmir Singh	Indian National Congress	
76	Sukhbir Singh	Aam Aadmi Party	
77	Sunita Devi	Indian National Congress	
78	Anita Sharma	Aam Aadmi Party	Elected as Independent councillor; later joined AAP
79	Shivali Devi	Aam Aadmi Party	Elected as INC councillor; later joined AAP
80	Raman Kumar	Indian National Congress	
81	Nisha Dhillon	Indian National Congress	
82	Sandeep Singh	Aam Aadmi Party	
83	Nagwant Kaur	Shiromani Akali Dal	
84	Rashpal Singh	Indian National Congress	
85	Natasha Gill	Aam Aadmi Party	Elected as Independent councillor; later joined AAP

== Previous election results ==
Year	Total Seats	INC	AAP	SAD(with an Alliance with BJP before 2024 elections)	BJP
2024	85	43	24	4	9
2017	85	60	4	13	Alliance with SAD
2012	65	4	~	48	Alliance with SAD
2007	65	18	~	33	Alliance with SAD
2002	60	33	~	7	Alliancee with SAD

~ Party didn't exist

== See also ==
Ludhiana Municipal Corporation

Patiala Municipal Corporation
