= Patiala Municipal Corporation =

Local civic body in Patiala, Punjab, India

Type
- Type: Municipal Corporation

History
- Founded: 24 September 1997
- Preceded by: Patiala Municipal Council

Leadership
- Minister in charge: Ravjot Singh
- Mayor: Kundan Gogia, AAP since 10 January 2025
- Senior deputy mayor: Harinder Singh Kohli, AAP since 10 January 2025
- Junior deputy mayor: Jagdeep Singh Jagga, AAP since 10 January 2025
- Municipal commissioner: Rajat Oberoi since 17 September 2024

Structure
- Seats: 63 (60 elected + 3 Ex-Officio)
- Political groups: Government (43): AAP (43); Opposition (11): INC (4); BJP (4); SAD (2); Vacant (7): Vacant (7); Ex-officios: TBA
- Length of term: 5 years

Elections
- First election: 2002
- Last election: 21 December 2024
- Next election: 2029

Website
- Official website

The Patiala Municipal Corporation is a nagar nigam (municipal corporation) which administers the city of Patiala, Punjab. It has 60 members elected with a first-past-the-post voting system and 3 ex-officio members which are MLAs for Patiala, Patiala Rural, and Sanaur. The corporation was founded on 24 September 1997, and the first elections were held in June 2002.

== Mayor ==
The mayor of Patiala is the elected chief of the Municipal Corporation of Patiala. The mayor is the first citizen of the city. The role is largely ceremonial as the real powers are vested in the Municipal Commissioner. The mayor plays a decorative role of representing and upholding the dignity of the city and a functional role in deliberating over the discussions in the Corporation.

S. No.	Name	Took office	Left office	Tenure	Party	Corporation	Ward No.	Ref.
1	Vishnu Sharma	13 June 2002	11 September 2007	5 years, 90 days	INC	1st		
2	Ajit Pal Singh Kohli	11 September 2007	17 September 2012	5 years, 6 days	SAD	2nd		
3	Jaspal Singh Pardhan	17 September 2012	25 February 2013	161 days	SAD	3rd	39	
4	Amaninder Bajaj	2 April 2013	17 December 2017	4 years, 249 days	SAD	3rd		
5	Sanjeev Sharma Bittu	17 December 2017	10 January 2025	7 years, 34 days	BJP	4th	8	
6	Kundan Gogia	10 January 2025	Incumbent	1 year, 216 days	Aam Aadmi Party	5th		

== Deputy mayors ==
Senior Deputy Mayor

S. No.	Name	Took office	Left office	Tenure	Party	Corporation	Ward No.
-	Yoginder Singh Yogi	17 December 2017	10 January 2025	7 years, 24 days	INC	4th	48
-	Harinder Singh Kohli	10 January 2025	Incumbent	1 year, 216 days	Aam Aadmi Party	5th	

Junior Deputy Mayor

S. No.	Name	Took office	Left office	Tenure	Party	Corporation	Ward No.
-	Vinita Sangar	17 December 2017	10 January 2025	7 years, 24 days	BJP	4th	51
-	Jagdeep Singh Jagga	10 January 2025	Incumbent	1 year, 216 days	Aam Aadmi Party	5th	

== Elections ==
Years					Others	Total
Years	INC	SAD	BJP	AAP	Others	Total
2002	38	6	0	–	6	50
2007	4	42		–	4	50
2012	8	39		–	2	49
2017	59	1	0	–	0	60
2024	4	2	4	43	0	60

== See also ==
Amritsar Municipal Corporation

Ludhiana Municipal Corporation
