= Ludhiana Municipal Corporation =

Local civic body in Ludhiana, Panjab, India

Ludhiana Municipal Corporation Ludhiana Nagar Nigam
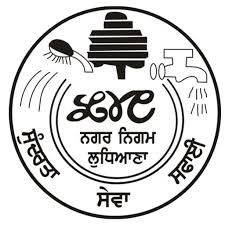

Type
- Type: Municipal Corporation

Leadership
- Mayor: Principal Inderjit Kaur, AAP since January 20, 2025
- Senior deputy mayor: Rakesh Prashar, AAP since January 20, 2025
- Junior deputy mayor: Prince Johar, AAP since January 20, 2025

Structure
- Seats: 95
- Political groups: Government (46): AAP (46); Opposition (47): INC (24); BJP (21); SAD (2); Others (2): IND (2); Ex-officios: TBA
- Length of term: 5 years

Elections
- Last election: 21 December 2024
- Next election: 2029

Website
- Official website

Ludhiana Municipal Corporation (LMC) is a local body to govern mainly urban area of Ludhiana, India. Municipal Corporation mechanism in India was introduced during British Rule with formation of municipal corporation in Madras (Chennai) in 1688, later followed by municipal corporations in Bombay (Mumbai) and Calcutta (Kolkata) by 1762. Ludhiana Municipal Corporation is headed by Mayor of city and governed by Commissioner. Ludhiana Municipal Corporation has been formed with functions to improve the infrastructure of town.

== Issues ==
The stray cows are a menace in the Indian cities including Ludhiana. Cow attacks on pedestrians and vehicles often becomes deadly. Moving vehicles colliding with stationary cow on the road, is the frequent cause of deadly road accidents in India. In 2021, Ludhiana MC had collected a cow cess of ₹3.5 crore. Hundreds of stray cows are seen roaming in the streets on public places.

== Revenue sources ==
The following are the Income sources for the Corporation from the Central and State Government.

=== Revenue from taxes ===
Following is the Tax related revenue for the corporation.

- Property tax.
- Profession tax.
- Entertainment tax.
- Grants from Central and State Government like Goods and Services Tax.
- Advertisement tax.

=== Revenue from non-tax sources ===
Following is the Non Tax related revenue for the corporation.

- Water usage charges.
- Fees from Documentation services.
- Rent received from municipal property.
- Funds from municipal bonds.

== Current members ==
Ludhiana Municipal Corporation has a total of 95 members or corporators, who are directly elected after a term of 5 years. The council is led by the Mayor. The latest elections were held in December 2024.

	Mayor: Inderjit Kaur					
	Senior Deputy Mayor: Rakesh Prashar					
	Junior Deputy Mayor: Prince Johar					
Zone	Ward No.	Category	Name of Corporator	Elected Party	Current Party	Remarks
Zone A
A	1	General (Women)	Ratanjit Kaur	IND	IND	
A	2	General (Women)	Sangeeta Kalsi	INC	INC	
A	3	General (Women)	Palvi Vinayak	BJP	BJP	
A	4	General	Sukhdev Bawa	INC	INC	
A	5	BC	Lakhwinder Chaudhary	AAP	AAP	
A	6	SC	Jagdish Lal	INC	AAP	Elected as an INC candidate, later defected to AAP.
A	7	General (Women)	Ravinder Kaur	INC	INC	
A	8	SC	Raj Kumar	INC	INC	
Zone B
B	9	General (Women)	Deeksha	BJP	BJP	
B	10	General	Pradeep Sharma	AAP	AAP	
B	11	General (Women)	Deepa Rani	IND	AAP	Elected as an independent candidate, later defected to AAP.
B	12	SC	Harjinder Paul	INC	INC	
B	13	General (Women)	Inderjit Kaur	AAP	AAP	Mayor of Ludhiana Municipal Corporation.
B	14	General	Sukhmail Singh	AAP	AAP	
B	15	SC (Women)	Jaspreet Kaur	AAP	AAP	
B	16	General	Ashwani Sharma	AAP	AAP	
B	17	SC (Women)	Ruby	BJP	BJP	
B	18	General	Anil Bhardwaj	BJP	BJP	
B	19	General (Women)	Nidhi Gupta	AAP	AAP	
B	20	General	Chatarveer Singh	SAD	SAD	Briefly joined AAP before returning to SAD.
B	21	General (Women)	Anita	BJP	AAP	Elected as a BJP candidate, later defected to AAP.
B	22	General	Jaspal Singh Grewal	AAP	AAP	
B	23	General (Women)	Shobha Sharma	BJP	BJP	
B	24	General	Gurmeet Singh	INC	INC	
B	25	General (Women)	Sukhjinder Kaur	INC	INC	
B	26	General	Gaurav	INC	INC	
B	27	General (Women)	Jasvir Kaur	BJP	BJP	
B	28	General	Amarjit Singh	AAP	AAP	
B	29	General (Women)	Kamal Manoucha	AAP	AAP	
B	30	SC	Nikku Bharti	AAP	AAP	
Zone C
C	31	General (Women)	Harmandeep Kaur	INC	INC	
C	32	SC	Jaswinder Singh	INC	INC	
C	33	SC (Women)	Kuldeep Kaur	BJP	BJP	
C	34	General	Rajesh Mishra	BJP	BJP	
C	35	General (Women)	Prabhpreet Kaur	AAP	AAP	
C	36	General	Satnam Singh	INC	INC	
C	37	General (Women)	Saroj Manan	AAP	AAP	
C	38	General	Satpal Singh	INC	INC	
C	39	General (Women)	Mandeep Kaur	INC	INC	
C	40	General	Prince Johar	AAP	AAP	Senior Deputy Mayor (2025–present).
C	41	General (Women)	Mamta Rani	INC	INC	
C	42	General	Jagmeet Singh	INC	AAP	Elected as an INC candidate, later defected to AAP.
C	43	General (Women)	Baljeet Kaur	INC	INC	
C	44	General	Sohan Singh Goga	AAP	AAP	
C	45	General (Women)	Parmjit Kaur	INC	AAP	Elected as an INC candidate, later defected to AAP.
C	46	General	Sukhdev Singh	INC	INC	
C	47	SC (Women)	Usha Rani Kalyan	AAP	AAP	
C	48	General	Rakhwinder Singh Gabria	SAD	SAD	
Zone D
D	49	General (Women)	Anita Sharma	BJP	BJP	
D	50	General	Yuvraj Singh Sidhu	AAP	AAP	
D	51	General (Women)	Komal Preet	AAP	AAP	
D	52	SC	Nirmal Singh Kaira	INC	INC	
D	53	General (Women)	Mehak Chadha	AAP	AAP	
D	54	General	Dilraj Singh	INC	INC	
D	55	General (Women)	Amrit Varsha Rampal	AAP	AAP	
D	56	General	Tanvir Singh Dhaliwal	AAP	AAP	
D	57	General (Women)	Veeran Bedi	AAP	AAP	
D	58	General	Satnam Singh	AAP	AAP	
D	59	General (Women)	Sonal Sharma	INC	INC	
D	60	General	Gurpreet Singh	AAP	AAP	
D	61	General (Women)	Parminder Kaur	INC	INC	
D	62	General	Sunil Moudgill	BJP	BJP	
D	63	General (Women)	Maninder Kaur Ghuman	AAP	AAP	
D	64	General (Women)	Indu Munish Shah	AAP	AAP	
D	65	General (Women)	Navdeep Kaur	INC	INC	
D	66	General	Rohit Sikka	BJP	BJP	
D	67	General (Women)	Sharanjit Kaur	AAP	AAP	
D	68	General	Pushpinder Kumar Bhanot	AAP	AAP	
D	69	General (Women)	Deepika Sunny Bhalla	INC	INC	
D	70	General (Women)	Suman Verma	BJP	BJP	
D	71	General (Women)	Nandini Jairath	AAP	AAP	
D	72	SC	Kapil Kumar	AAP	AAP	
D	73	General (Women)	Ruchi Vishal Gulati	BJP	BJP	
Zone B
B	74	General	Iqbal Singh	INC	INC	
B	75	General (Women)	Simranpreet Kaur	AAP	AAP	
B	76	General	Mukesh Khatri	BJP	BJP	
Zone A
A	77	General (Women)	Poonam Ratra	BJP	BJP	
A	78	BC	Surinder Kaur	AAP	AAP	
Zone B
B	79	General (Women)	Bhavneet Kaur	BJP	BJP	
B	80	General	Gourav	BJP	BJP	
B	81	General (Women)	Manju Gupta	BJP	BJP	
Zone A
A	82	General	Arun Sharma	INC	INC	
A	83	General (Women)	Monika Jaggi	IND	IND	
A	84	General	Sham Sunder Malhotra	INC	INC	
Zone D
D	85	General (Women)	Shallu Dawar	INC	INC	
Zone A
A	86	General	Manjit Singh Dhillon	AAP	AAP	
A	87	SC (Women)	Gurjeet Kaur	AAP	AAP	
A	88	General	Neeraj Ahuja	AAP	AAP	
A	89	SC (Women)	Aradhana Atwal	AAP	AAP	
A	90	General	Rakesh Prashar	AAP	AAP	Senior Deputy Mayor (2025–present)
Zone D
D	91	General (Women)	Tejinder Kaur	AAP	AAP	
D	92	General	Narinder Bhardwaj	AAP	AAP	
D	93	General (Women)	Bhupinder Kaur	INC	INC	
Zone A
A	94	General	Aman Kumar	AAP	AAP	
A	95	SC (Women)	Kashmir Kaur	AAP	AAP	

=== Party-wise Tally ===
Party-wise tally in the Ludhiana Municipal Corporation (2025–2030)
Party	Elected	Net Change	Current
Aam Aadmi Party	41	▲5	46
Indian National Congress	27	▼3	24
Bharatiya Janata Party	22	▼1	21
Shiromani Akali Dal	2	—	2
Independent	3	▼1	2
Total	95		95

== Election results ==
Year	Total Seats	INC	AAP	BJP	SAD	Others
2024	95	27	41	22	2	3
2018	95	62	1	21		11
2012	75	17	~	44		14
2007	75	15	~	42		18
2002	70	37	~	21		12

~ Party didn't exist

== See also ==
Amritsar Municipal Corporation

Patiala Municipal Corporation
