= 2024 Punjab, India local elections =

State elections in India

2024 Punjab municipal elections
- 21 December 2024

	Majority party	Minority party	Third party
Leader	Bhagwant Mann	Amrinder Singh Raja Warring	Sunil Kumar Jakhar
Party	AAP	INC	BJP
Last election	1	267	15
Seats won	158	122	56
Seat change	▲157	▼145	▲41
	Fourth party
Leader	Sukhbir Singh Badal
Party	SAD
Last election	37
Seats won	12
Seat change	▼25

Municipal elections were held in the Indian state of Punjab on 21 December 2024. The elections took place for 46 urban local bodies, including 5 municipal corporations and 41 municipal councils and nagar panchayats.

== Background ==
Previously, elections for these local bodies were held in December 2017, where Indian National Congress won four out of 5 Municipal Corporations with the BJP winning 1. Terms of Amritsar, Patiala and Jalandhar ended in January 2022, and of Ludhiana in March 2022 and of Phagwara in March 2020.

== Elections ==
Delimitition of the wards started in December 2022. In March 2023, Punjab and Haryana High Court directed Punjab state election commission to draw schedule for elections within two weeks. On 16 October 2023, election commission announced schedule for electoral rolls, with final publication for rolls scheduled for 10 November 2023.

Elections were held for the five municipal corporations--Amritsar, Jalandhar, Ludhiana, Phagwara and Patiala--besides the 44 municipal councils and by-polls to some urban local bodies.

Total of 1,609 polling locations having 3,809 polling booths were made by state election commission

== Voter statistics ==
Gender	No. of voters
Male	19,55,888
Female	17,76,544
Other	204
Total	37,32,636

== Schedule ==
The election schedule was announced by the Election Commission of Punjab on 8 December 2024.

Poll event	Schedule
Notification date	9 December 2024
Last date for filing nomination	12 December 2024
Scrutiny of nomination	13 December 2024
Last date for withdrawal of nomination	14 December 2024
Date of poll	21 December 2024
Date of counting of votes	21 December 2024

== Municipal corporations results ==
S.No.	Municipal corporation	Government before	Government after
1.	Amritsar Municipal Corporation	Indian National Congress	Aam Aadmi Party
2.	Jalandhar Municipal Corporation	Indian National Congress	Aam Aadmi Party
3.	Patiala Municipal Corporation	Indian National Congress	Aam Aadmi Party
4.	Ludhiana Municipal Corporation	Indian National Congress	Aam Aadmi Party
5.	Phagwara Municipal Corporation	Bharatiya Janata Party	Aam Aadmi Party

S.no.	Municipal corporations						
1.	Party						
1.	Party	INC	SAD	BJP	AAP	Others	Total
2.	MC won	0	0	0	5	0	5
3.	Seats won	122	12	56	158	20	368

=== Municipal corporation detailed results ===
SnNo.	Municipal corporations	Seats					
SnNo.	Municipal corporations	Seats	Indian National Congress	Shiromani Akali Dal	Aam Aadmi Party	Bharatiya Janata Party	Others
1.	Ludhiana	95	31	2	40	19	3
2.	Amritsar	85	43	4	24	9	5
3.	Jalandhar	85	24	0	38	20	3
4.	Patiala*	60	4	2	43	4	–
5.	Phagwara	50	20	4	13	4	9
Total		375	122	12	158	56	20

*Election to some wards of Patiala was cancelled by High Court of Punjab.

== Municipal Councils Results ==
Overall Ward Results
S.No.	Party	Wards Won
1	Aam Aadmi Party	515
2	Indian National Congress	187
3	Bharatiya Janata Party	68
4	Shiromani Akali Dal	26
5	Bahujan Samaj Party	3
6	Independents	155

== Aftermath ==
Aam Aadmi Party won five out of five municipal corporations of its own after several members defected from other parties and joined it.

== See also ==
2024 Indian general election in Punjab

Elections in Punjab
