= Mohali Municipal Corporation =

Local civic body in Mohali, Punjab, India

Type
- Type: Municipal Corporation

History
- Preceded by: Amarjeet Singh Sidhu (2021-2026)

Leadership
- Mayor: Sarabjit Singh Samana, AAP since 2026

Structure
- Seats: 50
- Political groups: Government (27): AAP (27); Opposition (20): INC (12); IND (4); SAD (4); BJP (3)
- Length of term: 5 years

Elections
- Last election: 26 May 2026
- Next election: 2031

Motto
- Think Big Achieve Big

Meeting place
- Municipal Corporation Complex, Sector 68, Mohali

Website
- mcmohali.org

The Mohali Municipal Corporation, also known as Municipal Corporation SAS Nagar, is the civic body that governs the planned city of Mohali in Punjab, India. Mohali is also the headquarters of the Mohali district. There are 50 wards of the city. There was 60.48% voter turnout in first election held on 22 February 2015.

== Past City Corporation (2015-2020) ==
Kulwant Singh was inaugural Mayor of Mohali since 31 August 2015 while Rishabh Jain was elected senior Deputy Mayor and Manjit Singh Sethi was Deputy Mayor of Mohali until 2020. Following is list of corporators chosen after Mohali Municipal Council Election 2015:-

== Problems ==
The main problems in city include parking, water shortage, garbage and parks/green belts maintenance are to be taken care of by these corporators.
