= Moga Municipal Corporation =

Local civic body in Moga, Punjab, India

Type
- Type: Municipal Corporation

History
- Founded: 24 November 1994
- Preceded by: Moga Municipal Council

Leadership
- Minister in charge: Balkar Singh
- Mayor: Vinaypal Kaur, AAP since 2026
- Senior Deputy Mayor: Rakesh Kumar, AAP since 2026
- Junior Deputy Mayor: Gaurav Garg, AAP since 2026
- Municipal commissioner: Gurwinder Singh Johal since 2026

Structure
- Seats: 50
- Political groups: Government (30): AAP (30); Opposition (20): INC (7); IND (7); SAD (3); BJP (3)
- Length of term: 5 Years

Elections
- Last election: 26 May 2026
- Next election: 2031

Website
- https://mcmoga.punjab.gov.in/Home

The Moga Municipal Corporation is a municipal corporation which administers the city of Moga, Punjab. It has 50 members elected with a first-past-the-post voting system and 1 ex-officio members which is MLA for Moga Assembly Constituency. The corporation was founded 2011, and the first elections were held in 2015.

== Mayor ==
The mayor of Moga is the elected chief of the Municipal Corporation of Moga. The mayor is the first citizen of the city. The role is largely ceremonial as the real powers are vested in the Municipal Commissioner. The mayor plays a decorative role of representing and upholding the dignity of the city and a functional role in deliberating over the discussions in the corporation.

No.	Name	Took office	Left office	Tenure	Party	Ward No.	Ref.
1	Akhsit Jain	10 March 2015	12 May 2021	6 years, 63 days	SAD	35	
2	Nitika Bhalla	13 May 2021	4 July 2023	2 years, 52 days	INC	5	
3	Baljit Singh Channi	21 August 2023	27 November 2025	2 years, 98 days	AAP	8	
(Note: Interim)	Parveen Kumar Peena	2 December 2025	18 January 2026	47 days	AAP	36	
3	Parveen Kumar Peena	19 January 2026	29 May 2026	130 days	AAP	36	
4	Vinaypal Kaur	11 June 2026	Incumbent	133 days	AAP	8	

== Deputy mayors ==
Senior Deputy Mayor

No.	Name	Took office	Left office	Tenure	Party	Ward No.
1	Parveen Kumar Sharma	13 May 2021	1 December 2025	4 years, 202 days	INC	36
1	Parveen Kumar Sharma	13 May 2021	1 December 2025	4 years, 202 days	AAP	36
2	Rakesh Kumar	6 July 2026	Incumbent	108 days	AAP	13

Junior Deputy Mayor

S. No.	Name	Took office	Left office	Tenure	Party	Ward No.
1	Ashok Dhamija	13 May 2021	29 May 2026	5 years, 16 days	INC	12
1	Ashok Dhamija	13 May 2021	29 May 2026	5 years, 16 days	AAP	12
2	Gaurav Garg	6 July 2026	Incumbent	108 days	AAP	41

== Elections ==
Years					Others	Total
Years	INC	SAD	BJP	AAP	Others	Total
2015	1	24	8	–	17	50
2021	20	15	1	4	10	50
2026	7	3	3	30	7	50

== List of Councilors ==
=== 2026 Councilors ===
Ward No.	Councilor		Margin
Ward No.	Name	Party	Margin
1	Harjeet Singh	Ind	104
2	Manpreet Kaur	INC	439
3	Manjeet Singh Mann	INC	1135
4	Kulwinder Kaur Sachdeva	AAP	328
5	Arvinder Singh	AAP	363
6	Ramandeep Kaur Khosa	AAP	888
7	Gavardhan Lal Arora	SAD	258
8	Vinaypal Kaur	AAP	228
9	Paramjit Kaur Sidhu	INC	162
10	Vikramjeet Singh Kalsi	AAP	288
11	Rita Chopra	AAP	839
12	Vandana Dhamija	AAP	274
13	Rakesh Kumar	AAP	1579
14	Ritu Bala	AAP	704
15	Devinder Singh	AAP	433
16	Varsha	AAP	309
17	Vikram Singh Bhatoa	AAP	98
18	Asha Rani	AAP	546
19	Manjit Singh Dhammu	SAD	60
20	Mridula	AAP	345
21	Ajay Kumar	BJP	272
22	Asha Rani	AAP	549
23	Yogesh Kumar	BJP	51
24	Hem Lata	BJP	30
25	Darshan Singh	INC	14
26	Sukhwinder Kaur	AAP	386
27	Varinder Singh	AAP	232
28	Gurwinder Kaur	AAP	66
29	Milap Singh	AAP	176
30	Rajni Mattu	AAP	171
31	Avtar Singh	AAP	88
32	Simran Bains	Ind	396
33	Jagseer Singh Hundal	AAP	471
34	Maya	Ind	25
35	Gurminderjeet Singh Sidhu	AAP	94
36	Tamana Rani	AAP	90
37	Reema Sood	INC	371
38	Dimple Sahil Arora	INC	55
39	Sanjay Sharma	AAP	236
40	Neeta Kaur	AAP	338
41	Gaurav Garg	AAP	791
42	Virdhi Gupta	Ind	95
43	Renu Rani	Ind	109
44	Sarabjit Kaur	AAP	—N/a (Note: Won unopposed)
45	Bharat Bhushan Garg	INC	33
46	Sapna Chopra	Ind	33
47	Raj Kumar Makhija	AAP	145
48	Rashpal Kaur Gill	AAP	385
49	Piara Singh	Ind	222
50	Satveer Kaur Brar	SAD	56

=== 2021 Councilors ===
Ward No.	Councilor		Margin
Ward No.	Name	Party	Margin
1	Harwinder Kaur Gill	SAD	151
2	Jaspreet Singh	Ind	464
3	Manjeet Singh Mann	INC	992
4	Gurpreet Singh Sachdeva	Ind	682
5	Nitika Bhalla	INC	741
6	Arvinder Kaur	Ind	22
7	Saroj Rani	SAD	103
8	Baljeet Singh	AAP	67
9	Sarabjeet Kaur	AAP	215
10	Vikramjeet Singh Kalsi	AAP	2
11	Rita Chopra	INC	850
12	Ashok Dhamija	INC	99
13	Anju Bala	SAD	575
14	Amarjit	INC	83
15	Parveen Kumari	SAD	859
16	Vijay Bhushan	INC	551
17	Kuldeep Kaur	INC	221
18	Bharat Bhushan Garg	SAD	59
19	Sukhdeep Kaur Dhammu	SAD	130
20	Manjit Singh Dhammu	SAD	95
21	Karamjit Paul	BJP	16
22	Parveen Kumar Makkar	Ind	595
23	Sapna Chopra	SAD	44
24	Tarsem Singh	INC	118
25	Varinder Kaur	INC	248
26	Vijay Kumar Khurana	INC	187
27	Kulwinder Kaur	INC	11
28	Jagjeet Singh	INC	69
29	Ram Kaur	SAD	57
30	Boota Singh	Ind	9
31	Gurdeep Kaur	INC	216
32	Boota Singh	SAD	22
33	Kiran Kaur Hundal	AAP	81
34	Hari Ram	SAD	107
35	Sukhwinder Kaur	Ind	56
36	Parveen Kumar Sharma	INC	287
37	Reema Sood	Ind	295
38	Sahil Arora	INC	384
39	Kusum Bali	INC	39
40	Tirath Ram	Ind	82
41	Payal	Ind	540
42	Gaurav Gupta	SAD	30
43	Renu Rani	SAD	117
44	Matwal Singh	SAD	71
45	Mandeep Kaur	INC	439
46	Surinder Singh	Ind	205
47	Poonam Rani Makhija	SAD	364
48	Kulwinder Singh Gill	INC	258
49	Surjeet Kaur Gill	INC	662
50	Jaswinder Singh	INC	515
