= Abohar Municipal Corporation =

Municipal corporation for Abohar, Punjab

Type
- Type: Municipal Corporation

History
- Founded: 4 September 2019
- Preceded by: Abohar Municipal Council

Leadership
- Minister in charge: Harjot Singh Bains
- Mayor: Pooja Wadhwa, BJP since 21 July 2026
- Senior Deputy Mayor: Dharamveer Malkat, BJP since 21 July 2026
- Junior Deputy Mayor: Deepak Chhapola, BJP since 21 July 2026
- Municipal commissioner: Amarpreet Kaur Sandhu, IAS

Structure
- Seats: 50
- Political groups: Government (28): BJP (28); Opposition (22): AAP (20); INC (1); IND (1)
- Length of term: 5 Years

Elections
- Last election: 26 May 2026
- Next election: 2031

Website
- mcabohar.punjab.gov.in/Home

The Abohar Municipal Corporation is a municipal corporation which administers the city of Abohar, Punjab, India. It has 50 members elected with a first-past-the-post voting system and 1 ex-officio members which is MLA for Abohar Assembly Constituency. The corporation was founded 2019, and the first elections were held in 2021.

== Mayor ==
The mayor of Abohar is the elected chief of the Municipal Corporation of Abohar. The role is largely ceremonial as the real powers are vested in the Municipal Commissioner. The mayor plays a decorative role of representing and upholding the dignity of the city and a functional role in deliberating over the discussions in the corporation.

No.	Name	Took office	Left office	Tenure	Party	Ward	Ref.
1	Vimal Thathai	9 April 2021	10 August 2023	5 years, 47 days	Indian National Congress	40	
1	Vimal Thathai	10 August 2023	26 May 2026	5 years, 47 days	Bharatiya Janata Party	40	
2	Pooja Wadhwa	21 July 2026	Incumbent	100 days	Bharatiya Janata Party	12	

== Deputy mayors ==
Senior Deputy Mayor
No.	Name	Took office	Left office	Tenure	Party	Ward	Ref.
1	Ganpat Ram	9 April 2021	10 August 2023	5 years, 47 days	Indian National Congress	50	
1	Ganpat Ram	10 August 2023	26 May 2026	5 years, 47 days	Bharatiya Janata Party	50	
2	Dharamvir Malkat	21 July 2026	Incumbent	100 days	Bharatiya Janata Party	1	

Junior Deputy Mayor
No.	Name	Took office	Left office	Tenure	Party	Ward	Ref.
1	Raj Kumar	9 April 2021	10 August 2023	5 years, 47 days	Indian National Congress	18	
1	Raj Kumar	10 August 2023	26 May 2026	5 years, 47 days	Bharatiya Janata Party	18	
2	Deepak Chhapola	21 July 2026	Incumbent	100 days	Bharatiya Janata Party	9	

== Elections ==
Years					Others	Total
Years	INC	SAD	BJP	AAP	Others	Total
2021	49	1	0	0	0	50
2026	1	0	28	20	1	50

== Councillor's List ==
List of Councillors in Abohar Municipal Corporation (2026–2031)
Ward No.	Councillor Name	Political Party	Locality / Area Covered
1	Sunil Lata	Aam Aadmi Party	Sant Nagar, Street No. 2
2	Nirmaljeet Singh Richi	Bharatiya Janata Party	Jammu Basti, Main Street
3	Jashanpreet Singh Sandhu	Bharatiya Janata Party	Baba Deep Singh Nagar
4	Gurpreet Kaur	Aam Aadmi Party	Panjpeer Nagar
5	Jagdish Kumar Dugal	Bharatiya Janata Party	Panjpeer Nagar, Street No. 1
6	Rani	Aam Aadmi Party	Dharam Nagari, Street No. 2
7	Bhisham Kumar Dhuria	Bharatiya Janata Party	Ekta Colony
8	Salochna	Bharatiya Janata Party	South Avenue, Street No. 10
9	Anil Kumar	Bharatiya Janata Party	Subhash Nagar, Street No. 2
10	Ranjit Kaur	Aam Aadmi Party	Waryam Nagar
11	Naresh Kumar	Bharatiya Janata Party	Main City Area
12	To be updated	Bharatiya Janata Party	New Abadi East
13	To be updated	Bharatiya Janata Party	Central Town
14	To be updated	Aam Aadmi Party	Railway Road Area
15	To be updated	Bharatiya Janata Party	Sadar Bazaar
16	To be updated	Aam Aadmi Party	Old Grain Market
17	To be updated	Bharatiya Janata Party	Major Basti Area
18	Raj Kumar Nirania	Aam Aadmi Party	Azimgarh, House No. 26
19	To be updated	Bharatiya Janata Party	Local Extension Area
20	To be updated	Aam Aadmi Party	New Basti West
21	To be updated	Bharatiya Janata Party	Model Town Area
22	Veerpal Kaur	Aam Aadmi Party	Shahid Bhagat Singh Nagar, St. 1
23	To be updated	Bharatiya Janata Party	Preet Nagar
24	To be updated	Aam Aadmi Party	Defence Colony Link
25	Satish Narula	Bharatiya Janata Party	Dashmesh Nagar, Street 2-3
26	Anita Rani	Aam Aadmi Party	Nai Abadi, Street No. 21
27	Guddi Devi	Indian National Congress	Kandwala Road, Durga Nagari
28	Madhu	Independent	Chandigarh Mohalla, Kandwala Road
29	Satyawan	Aam Aadmi Party	Shiv Shakya Nagar
30	Jasbir Kaur	Bharatiya Janata Party	Jaswant Nagar, Ganganagar Road
31	Narinder Verma	Bharatiya Janata Party	Chotti Pouri, Street No. 1
32	Kamla Devi	Aam Aadmi Party	Indra Nagari, Street No. 5
33	Punit Kumar	Bharatiya Janata Party	Indra Nagari, Street No. 1
34	Rikul Sharma	Bharatiya Janata Party	Near Amrti Colony
35	To be updated	Aam Aadmi Party	Azeemgarh North
36	To be updated	Bharatiya Janata Party	Gobind Nagari
37	To be updated	Aam Aadmi Party	Anand Nagari Area
38	To be updated	Bharatiya Janata Party	Thakur Abadi
39	To be updated	Aam Aadmi Party	Canal Colony Backside
40	Vimal Kumar Thathai	Bharatiya Janata Party	Patel Nagar, Street No. 6
41	To be updated	Bharatiya Janata Party	Rajiv Nagar
42	To be updated	Aam Aadmi Party	Suratgarh Road Enclave
43	To be updated	Aam Aadmi Party	Housing Board Colony
44	To be updated	Bharatiya Janata Party	Sant Nagar West
45	To be updated	Aam Aadmi Party	Gaushala Road
46	To be updated	Bharatiya Janata Party	Border Road Area
47	To be updated	Aam Aadmi Party	Hanumangarh Road Basti
48	To be updated	Bharatiya Janata Party	Green Avenue Link
49	To be updated	Aam Aadmi Party	Shanti Nagar
50	Ganpat Ram Dholia	Bharatiya Janata Party	Dayal Nagari
