= Bathinda Municipal Corporation =

Local civic body in Bathinda, Punjab, India

Type
- Type: Municipal Corporation

History
- Preceded by: Bathinda Municipal Council

Leadership
- Minister in charge: Sanjeev Arora
- Mayor: Padamjeet Singh Mehta, AAP since 2026
- Municipal commissioner: Kanchan, IAS

Structure
- Seats: 51 (50 elected + 1 ex-officio)
- Political groups: Government (35): AAP (35); Opposition (15): IND (6); INC (5); SAD (3); BJP (1); Ex-officio: AAP (1)
- Length of term: 5 Years

Elections
- Last election: 26 May 2026
- Next election: 2031

Website
- Official website

The Bathinda Municipal Corporation is a municipal corporation which administers the city of Bathinda, Punjab. It has 50 members elected with a first-past-the-post voting system and 1 ex-officio member which is MLA for Bathinda Urban. The corporation was founded 2003, and the first elections were held in 2005.

== Mayor ==
The mayor of Bathinda is the elected chief of the Municipal Corporation of Bathinda. The mayor is the first citizen of the city. The role is largely ceremonial as the real powers are vested in the Municipal Commissioner. The Mayor plays a decorative role of representing and upholding the dignity of the city and a functional role in deliberating over the discussions in the corporation.

S. No.	Name	Took office	Left office	Tenure	Party	Corporation	Ward No.	Ref.
-	Raman Goyal	16 April 2021	5 February 2025	3 years, 295 days	INC			
-	Padamjeet Singh Mehta	5 February 2025	Incumbent	1 year, 213 days	AAP			

== Elections ==
Years					Others	Total
Years	INC	SAD	BJP	AAP	Others	Total
2015	10	21	8	0	11	50
2021	43	7	0	0	0	50
2026	5	3	1	35	6	50
