= List of current Indian mayors =

Mayors of Indian cities is the list of mayors of various cities and towns in India. A mayor in India is the head of the municipal corporation and first citizen of that city of town. Many cities and towns in India have mayors and the procedure to elect them varies from one state to another. The term of their office, their powers and the procedure for electing them too varies from one Indian state to another.

== Current mayors ==
This is the list of current mayors in the Indian cities:

=== States ===
==== Andhra Pradesh ====
No.	District	City	Corporation	Mayor	Party	Elections	
No.	District	City	Corporation	Mayor	Party	Previous	Next
1	Anantapur	Anantapur	Anantapur Municipal Corporation	Chitluru Ramesh Goud	YSR Congress Party	2026	2031
2	Chittoor	Chittoor	Chittoor Municipal Corporation	Kathari Hemalatha	Telugu Desam Party	2026	2031
3	East Godavari	Rajahmundry	Rajamahendravaram Municipal Corporation	Election scheduled on 26 November 2026		2014	2026
4	Eluru	Eluru	Eluru Municipal Corporation	Reddy Appalanayudu	Jana Sena Party	2026	2031
5	Guntur	Guntur	Guntur Municipal Corporation	Kovelamudi Lakshmi Aparna	Telugu Desam Party	2026	2031
6	Guntur	Mangalagiri - Tadepalli	Mangalagiri – Tadepalli Municipal Corporation	Newly created (Election on 26 November 2026)		—	2026
7	Kadapa	Kadapa	Kadapa Municipal Corporation	Nellaturi Suvarna	Telugu Desam Party	2026	2031
8	Kakinada	Kakinada	Kakinada Municipal Corporation	Election scheduled on 26 November 2026		2017	2026
9	Krishna	Machilipatnam	Machilipatnam Municipal Corporation	Shaik Abdul Abida	Telugu Desam Party	2026	2031
10	Kurnool	Kurnool	Kurnool Municipal Corporation	Bolleddula Jyothi Prathyusha	Telugu Desam Party	2026	2031
11	Nellore	Nellore	Nellore Municipal Corporation	Poluboina Roop Kumar Yadav	Telugu Desam Party	2026	2031
12	NTR	Vijayawada	Vijayawada Municipal Corporation	Vangaveeti Radhakrishna	Jana Sena Party	2026	2031
13	Prakasam	Ongole	Ongole Municipal Corporation	Nallimilli Sri Shilpa	Telugu Desam Party	2026	2031
14	Srikakulam	Srikakulam	Srikakulam Municipal Corporation	Newly created (Election on 26 November 2026)		—	2026
15	Tirupati	Tirupati	Tirupati Municipal Corporation	Mannem Srinivasa Prasad	Telugu Desam Party	2026	2031
16	Visakhapatnam	Visakhapatnam	Greater Visakhapatnam Municipal Corporation	Mukka Sravani	Telugu Desam Party	2026	2031
17	Vizianagaram	Vizianagaram	Vizianagaram Municipal Corporation	Avanapu Bhargavi	Telugu Desam Party	2026	2031

==== Arunachal Pradesh ====
No.	District	City	Corporation	Mayor	Party	Elections	
No.	District	City	Corporation	Mayor	Party	Previous	Next
1	Itanagar	Itanagar	Itanagar Municipal Corporation	Likha Nari Tadar	Bharatiya Janata Party	2025	2030

==== Assam ====
No.	District	City	Corporation	Mayor	Party	Elections	
No.	District	City	Corporation	Mayor	Party	Previous	Next
1	Cachar	Silchar	Silchar Municipal Corporation	Amarendra Paul	Bharatiya Janata Party	2026	2031
2	Dibrugarh	Dibrugarh	Dibrugarh Municipal Corporation	Saikat Patra	Bharatiya Janata Party	2022	2027
3	Kamrup Metropolitan	Guwahati	Guwahati Municipal Corporation	Mrigen Sarania	Bharatiya Janata Party	2022	2027

==== Bihar ====
No.	District	City	Corporation	Mayor	Party	Elections	
No.	District	City	Corporation	Mayor	Party	Previous	Next
1	Begusarai	Begusarai	Begusarai Municipal Corporation	Pinki Devi	Non-partisan	2022	2027
2	Bhagalpur	Bhagalpur	Bhagalpur Municipal Corporation	Basundhara Lal	Non-partisan	2022	2027
3	Bhojpur	Arrah	Arrah Municipal Corporation	Indu Devi	Non-partisan	2022	2027
4	Darbhanga	Darbhanga	Darbhanga Municipal Corporation	Anjum Ara	Non-partisan	2022	2027
5	East Champaran	Motihari	Motihari Municipal Corporation	Preeti Kumari	Non-partisan	2022	2027
6	Gaya	Gaya	Gaya Municipal Corporation	Birendra Kumar	Non-partisan	2022	2027
7	Katihar	Katihar	Katihar Municipal Corporation	Usha Devi Agarwal	Non-partisan	2022	2027
8	Madhubani	Madhubani	Madhubani Municipal Corporation	Arun Rai	Non-partisan	2022	2027
9	Munger	Munger	Munger Municipal Corporation	Kumkum Devi	Non-partisan	2022	2027
10	Muzaffarpur	Muzaffarpur	Muzaffarpur Municipal Corporation	Nirmala Sahu	Non-partisan	2022	2027
11	Nalanda	Bihar Sharif	Bihar Sharif Municipal Corporation	Aneeta Devi	Non-partisan	2022	2027
12	Patna	Patna	Patna Municipal Corporation	Sita Sahu	Non-partisan	2022	2027
13	Purnia	Purnia	Purnia Municipal Corporation	Vibha Kumari	Non-partisan	2022	2027
14	Rohtas	Sasaram	Sasaram Municipal Corporation	Kajal Kumari	Non-partisan	2022	2027
15	Saharsa	Saharsa	Saharsa Municipal Corporation	Priya Sanjeev Jha	Non-partisan	2022	2027
16	Samastipur	Samastipur	Samastipur Municipal Corporation	Anita Ram	Non-partisan	2022	2027
17	Saran	Chhapra	Chhapra Municipal Corporation	Lakshmi Narayan Gupta	Non-partisan	2022	2027
18	Sitamarhi	Sitamarhi	Sitamarhi Municipal Corporation	Raunak Jahan Parvez	Non-partisan	2022	2027
19	West Champaran	Bettiah	Bettiah Municipal Corporation	Garima Devi Sikaria	Non-partisan	2022	2027

==== Chhattisgarh ====
No.	District	City	Corporation	Mayor	Party	Elections	
No.	District	City	Corporation	Mayor	Party	Previous	Next
1	Bastar	Jagdalpur	Jagdalpur Municipal Corporation	Sanjay Pandey	Bharatiya Janata Party	2025	2030
2	Bilaspur	Bilaspur	Bilaspur Municipal Corporation	Pooja Vidhani	Bharatiya Janata Party	2025	2030
3	Dhamtari	Dhamtari	Dhamtari Municipal Corporation	Jagdish Ramu Mehra	Bharatiya Janata Party	2025	2030
4	Durg	Bhilai Charoda	Bhilai Charoda Municipal Corporation	Nirmal Kosare	Indian National Congress	2021	2026
5	Durg	Bhilai	Bhilai Municipal Corporation	Neeraj Pal	Indian National Congress	2021	2026
6	Durg	Durg	Durg Municipal Corporation	Alka Baghmar	Bharatiya Janata Party	2025	2030
7	Durg	Risali	Risali Municipal Corporation	Shashi Sinha	Indian National Congress	2021	2026
8	Korba	Korba	Korba Municipal Corporation	Sanju Devi Rajput	Bharatiya Janata Party	2025	2030
9	Koriya	Chirmiri	Chirmiri Municipal Corporation	Ram Naresh Rai	Bharatiya Janata Party	2025	2030
10	Raigarh	Raigarh	Raigarh Municipal Corporation	Jeevardhan Chauhan	Bharatiya Janata Party	2025	2030
11	Raipur	Birgaon	Birgaon Municipal Corporation	Nandlal Devangan	Indian National Congress	2021	2026
12	Raipur	Raipur	Raipur Municipal Corporation	Meenal Choubey	Bharatiya Janata Party	2025	2030
13	Rajnandgaon	Rajnandgaon	Rajnandgaon Municipal Corporation	Madhusudan Yadav	Bharatiya Janata Party	2025	2030
14	Surguja	Ambikapur	Ambikapur Municipal Corporation	Manjusha Bhagat	Bharatiya Janata Party	2025	2030

==== Goa ====
No.	District	City	Corporation	Mayor	Party	Elections	
No.	District	City	Corporation	Mayor	Party	Previous	Next
1	North Goa	Panaji	Panaji City Corporation	Rohit Monserrate	Non-partisan (Note: Officially non-partisan though affiliates with the BJP.)	2026	2031

==== Gujarat ====
No.	District	City	Corporation	Mayor	Party	Elections	
No.	District	City	Corporation	Mayor	Party	Previous	Next
1	Ahmedabad	Ahmedabad	Ahmedabad Municipal Corporation	Hitesh Barot	Bharatiya Janata Party	February 2026	2031
2	Anand	Anand	Anand Municipal Corporation	Dipika Patel	Bharatiya Janata Party	February 2026	2031
3	Bhavnagar	Bhavnagar	Bhavnagar Municipal Corporation	Ushaben Talreja	Bharatiya Janata Party	February 2026	2031
4	Gandhinagar	Gandhinagar	Gandhinagar Municipal Corporation	TBA	Bharatiya Janata Party	October 2026	2031
5	Jamnagar	Jamnagar	Jamnagar Municipal Corporation	Monika Vyas	Bharatiya Janata Party	February 2026	2031
6	Junagadh	Junagadh	Junagadh Municipal Corporation	Dharmesh Posiya	Bharatiya Janata Party	2025	2030
7	Kheda	Nadiad	Nadiad Municipal Corporation	Manish Patel	Bharatiya Janata Party	February 2026	2031
8	Kutch	Gandhidham	Gandhidham Municipal Corporation	Divya Nathani	Bharatiya Janata Party	February 2026	2031
9	Mehsana	Mehsana	Mehsana Municipal Corporation	Sonalben Oza	Bharatiya Janata Party	February 2026	2031
10	Morbi	Morbi	Morbi Municipal Corporation	Uttam Surani	Bharatiya Janata Party	February 2026	2031
11	Navsari	Navsari	Navsari Municipal Corporation	Ashok Dhorajiya	Bharatiya Janata Party	February 2026	2031
12	Porbandar	Porbandar	Porbandar Municipal Corporation	Sagar Modi	Bharatiya Janata Party	February 2026	2031
13	Rajkot	Rajkot	Rajkot Municipal Corporation	Nehal Shukla	Bharatiya Janata Party	February 2026	2031
14	Surat	Surat	Surat Municipal Corporation	Mayaben Mavani	Bharatiya Janata Party	February 2026	2031
15	Surendranagar	Surendranagar	Surendranagar Municipal Corporation	Rakesh Rathod	Bharatiya Janata Party	February 2026	2031
16	Vadodara	Vadodara	Vadodara Municipal Corporation	Gitaben Makwana	Bharatiya Janata Party	February 2026	2031
17	Valsad	Vapi	Vapi Municipal Corporation	Daksha Patel	Bharatiya Janata Party	February 2026	2031

==== Haryana ====
No.	District	City	Corporation	Mayor	Party	Elections	
No.	District	City	Corporation	Mayor	Party	Previous	Next
1	Ambala	Ambala	Ambala Municipal Corporation	Akshita Saini	Bharatiya Janata Party	2026	2031
2	Faridabad	Faridabad	Faridabad Municipal Corporation	Praveen Joshi	Bharatiya Janata Party	2025	2030
3	Gurugram	Gurugram	Gurugram Municipal Corporation	Rajrani Malhotra	Bharatiya Janata Party	2025	2030
4	Gurugram	Manesar	Manesar Municipal Corporation	Inderjeet Kaur Yadav	Bharatiya Janata Party	2025	2030
5	Hisar	Hisar	Hisar Municipal Corporation	Praveen Popli	Bharatiya Janata Party	2025	2030
6	Karnal	Karnal	Karnal Municipal Corporation	Renu Bala Gupta	Bharatiya Janata Party	2025	2030
7	Panchkula	Panchkula	Panchkula Municipal Corporation	Shyam Lal Bansal	Bharatiya Janata Party	2026	2031
8	Panipat	Panipat	Panipat Municipal Corporation	Komal Saini	Bharatiya Janata Party	2025	2030
9	Rohtak	Rohtak	Rohtak Municipal Corporation	Ram Avtar Singh	Bharatiya Janata Party	2025	2030
10	Sonipat	Sonipat	Sonipat Municipal Corporation	Rajeev Jain	Bharatiya Janata Party	2026	2031
11	Yamunanagar	Yamunanagar	Yamunanagar–Jagadhri Municipal Corporation	Suman Bahmani	Bharatiya Janata Party	2025	2030

==== Himachal Pradesh ====
No.	District	City	Corporation	Mayor	Party	Elections	
No.	District	City	Corporation	Mayor	Party	Previous	Next
1	Hamirpur	Hamirpur	Hamirpur Municipal Corporation	Newly created			2026
2	Kangra	Dharamshala	Dharamshala Municipal Corporation	Shamsher Nehria	Bharatiya Janata Party	May 2026	2031
3	Kangra	Palampur	Palampur Municipal Corporation	Radha Sood	Indian National Congress	May 2026	2031
4	Mandi	Mandi	Mandi Municipal Corporation	Suman Thakur	Bharatiya Janata Party	May 2026	2031
5	Shimla	Shimla	Shimla Municipal Corporation	Surinder Chauhan	Indian National Congress	2023	2028
6	Solan	Baddi	Baddi Municipal Corporation	Newly created			2026
7	Solan	Solan	Solan Municipal Corporation	Sushma Sharma	Bharatiya Janata Party	May 2026	2031
8	Una	Una	Una Municipal Corporation	Newly created			2026

==== Jharkhand ====
No.	District	City	Corporation	Mayor	Party	Elections	
No.	District	City	Corporation	Mayor	Party	Previous	Next
1	Bokaro	Bokaro Steel City & Chas	Chas Municipal Corporation	Bholu Paswan	Non-partisan	2026	2031
2	Deoghar	Deoghar	Deoghar Municipal Corporation	Ravi Kumar Raut	Non-partisan	2026	2031
3	Dhanbad	Dhanbad	Dhanbad Municipal Corporation	Sanjeev Singh	Non-partisan	2026	2031
4	East Singhbhum	Jamshedpur	Mango Municipal Corporation	Sudha Gupta	Non-partisan	2026	2031
5	Giridih	Giridih	Giridih Municipal Corporation	Pramila Mehra	Non-partisan	2026	2031
6	Hazaribagh	Hazaribagh	Hazaribagh Municipal Corporation	Arvind Kumar Rana	Non-partisan	2026	2031
7	Palamu	Medininagar	Medininagar Municipal Corporation	Aruna Shankar	Non-partisan	2026	2031
8	Ranchi	Ranchi	Ranchi Municipal Corporation	Roshni Khalkho	Non-partisan	2026	2031
9	Seraikela Kharsawan	Adityapur	Adityapur Municipal Corporation	Sanjay Sardar	Non-partisan	2026	2031

==== Karnataka ====
No.	District	City	Corporation	Mayor	Party	Elections	
No.	District	City	Corporation	Mayor	Party	Previous	Next
1	Ballari	Ballari	Ballari City Corporation	Administrative Control (Note: Term ended in April 2026 prompting the corporation to be under administrative control.)		April 2021	2026
2	Belagavi	Belgaum	Belagavi City Corporation	Mangesh Pawar	Bharatiya Janata Party	September 2021	2026
3	Bengaluru Urban	Bengaluru	Bengaluru Central City Corporation	Newly created (Note: Erstwhile BBMP, now quintuplicated and coordinated under an apex body GBA.)			2026
4	Bengaluru Urban	Bengaluru	Bengaluru East City Corporation	Newly created			2026
5	Bengaluru Urban	Bengaluru	Bengaluru North City Corporation	Newly created			2026
6	Bengaluru Urban	Bengaluru	Bengaluru South City Corporation	Newly created			2026
7	Bengaluru Urban	Bengaluru	Bengaluru West City Corporation	Newly created			2026
8	Bidar	Bidar	Bidar City Corporation	Upgraded from Municipal Council to Municipal Corporation			2026
9	Dakshina Kannada	Mangaluru	Mangaluru City Corporation	Administrative Control (Note: Term ended in 2024 prompting the corporation to be under administrative control.)		2019	2026
10	Davanagere	Davanagere	Davanagere City Corporation	Administrative Control		2019	2026
11	Dharwad	Hubli & Dharwad	Hubli-Dharwad Municipal Corporation	Ramappa Badiger	Bharatiya Janata Party	September 2021	2026
12	Hassan	Hassan	Hassan City Corporation	Newly created			2026
13	Kalaburagi	Kalaburagi	Kalaburagi City Corporation	Yellappa Naikodi	Indian National Congress	September 2021	2026
14	Mysuru	Mysuru	Mysuru City Corporation	Administrative Control (Note: Term ended in 2024 prompting the corporation to be under administrative control.)		2018	2026
15	Raichur	Raichur	Raichur City Corporation	Newly created			2026
16	Shivamogga	Shivamogga	Shivamogga City Corporation	Administrative Control (Note: Term ended in 2024 prompting the corporation to be under administrative control.)		2018	2026
17	Tumakuru	Tumakuru	Tumakuru City Corporation	Administrative Control		2018	2026
18	Vijayapura	Vijayapura	Vijayapura City Corporation	Corporation Dissolved (Note: Corporation was dissolved in March 2025 after councillors failed to submit asset declaration forms.)		2022	2026

==== Kerala ====
No.	District	City	Corporation	Mayor	Party	Elections	
No.	District	City	Corporation	Mayor	Party	Previous	Next
1	Ernakulam	Kochi	Kochi Municipal Corporation	V. K. Minimol	United Democratic Front	2025	2030
2	Kannur	Kannur	Kannur Municipal Corporation	P. Indira	United Democratic Front	2025	2030
3	Kollam	Kollam	Kollam Municipal Corporation	A. K. Hafeez	United Democratic Front	2025	2030
4	Kozhikode	Kozhikode	Kozhikode Municipal Corporation	O. Sadashivan	Left Democratic Front	2025	2030
5	Thiruvananthapuram	Thiruvananthapuram	Thiruvananthapuram Corporation	V. V. Rajesh	National Democratic Alliance	2025	2030
6	Thrissur	Thrissur	Thrissur Municipal Corporation	Niji Justin	United Democratic Front	2025	2030

==== Madhya Pradesh ====
No.	District	City	Corporation	Mayor	Party	Elections	
No.	District	City	Corporation	Mayor	Party	Previous	Next
1	Bhopal	Bhopal	Bhopal Municipal Corporation	Malti Rai	Bharatiya Janata Party	2022	2027
2	Burhanpur	Burhanpur	Burhanpur Municipal Corporation	Madhuri Patel	Bharatiya Janata Party	2022	2027
3	Chhindwara	Chhindwara	Chhindwara Municipal Corporation	Vikram Singh Ahake	Indian National Congress	2022	2027
4	Dewas	Dewas	Dewas Municipal Corporation	Geeta Agrawal	Bharatiya Janata Party	2022	2027
5	Gwalior	Gwalior	Gwalior Municipal Corporation	Shobha Sikarwar	Indian National Congress	2022	2027
6	Indore	Indore	Indore Municipal Corporation	Pushyamitra Bhargav	Bharatiya Janata Party	2022	2027
7	Jabalpur	Jabalpur	Jabalpur Municipal Corporation	Jagat Bahadur Singh	Bharatiya Janata Party	2022	2027
8	Katni	Katni	Katni Municipal Corporation	Preeti Suri	Bharatiya Janata Party	2022	2027
9	Khandwa	Khandwa	Khandwa Municipal Corporation	Amrita Yadav	Bharatiya Janata Party	2022	2027
10	Morena	Morena	Morena Municipal Corporation	Sharda Solanki	Bharatiya Janata Party	2022	2027
11	Ratlam	Ratlam	Ratlam Municipal Corporation	Prahlad Patel	Bharatiya Janata Party	2022	2027
12	Rewa	Rewa	Rewa Municipal Corporation	Ajay Mishra	Indian National Congress	2022	2027
13	Sagar	Sagar	Sagar Municipal Corporation	Sangeeta Tiwari	Bharatiya Janata Party	2022	2027
14	Satna	Satna	Satna Municipal Corporation	Yogesh Kumar Tamrakar	Bharatiya Janata Party	2022	2027
15	Singrauli	Singrauli	Singrauli Municipal Corporation	Rani Agrawal	Aam Aadmi Party	2022	2027
16	Ujjain	Ujjain	Ujjain Municipal Corporation	Mukesh Tatwal	Bharatiya Janata Party	2022	2027

==== Maharashtra ====
No.	District	City	Corporation	Mayor	Party	Elections	
No.	District	City	Corporation	Mayor	Party	Previous	Next
1	Ahilyanagar	Ahilyanagar	Ahilyanagar Municipal Corporation	Jyoti Gade	Nationalist Congress Party	2026	2031
2	Akola	Akola	Akola Municipal Corporation	Sharda Khedkar	Bharatiya Janata Party	2026	2031
3	Amravati	Amravati	Amravati Municipal Corporation	Shrichand Tejwani	Bharatiya Janata Party	2026	2031
4	Chandrapur	Chandrapur	Chandrapur Municipal Corporation	Sangeeta Khandekar	Bharatiya Janata Party	2026	2031
5	Chhatrapati Sambhajinagar	Chhatrapati Sambhajinagar	Chhatrapati Sambhajinagar Municipal Corporation	Sameer Rajurkar	Bharatiya Janata Party	2026	2031
6	Dhule	Dhule	Dhule Municipal Corporation	Pratibha Chaudhari	Bharatiya Janata Party	2026	2031
7	Jalgaon	Jalgaon	Jalgaon Municipal Corporation	Deepmala Kale	Bharatiya Janata Party	2026	2031
8	Jalna	Jalna	Jalna Municipal Corporation	Vandana Magre	Bharatiya Janata Party	2026	2031
9	Kolhapur	Ichalkaranji	Ichalkaranji Municipal Corporation	Uday Dhatunde	Bharatiya Janata Party	2026	2031
10	Kolhapur	Kolhapur	Kolhapur Municipal Corporation	Ruparani Nikam	Bharatiya Janata Party	2026	2031
11	Latur	Latur	Latur Municipal Corporation	Jayashri Sonkamble	Indian National Congress	2026	2031
12	Mumbai City	Mumbai	Brihanmumbai Municipal Corporation	Ritu Tawde	Bharatiya Janata Party	2026	2031
12	Mumbai Suburban	Mumbai	Brihanmumbai Municipal Corporation	Ritu Tawde	Bharatiya Janata Party	2026	2031
13	Nagpur	Nagpur	Nagpur Municipal Corporation	Neeta Thakre	Bharatiya Janata Party	2026	2031
14	Nanded	Nanded	Nanded Municipal Corporation	Kavita Muley	Bharatiya Janata Party	2026	2031
15	Nashik	Malegaon	Malegaon Municipal Corporation	Nasreen Khalid	Indian Secular Largest Assembly of Maharashtra	2026	2031
16	Nashik	Nashik	Nashik Municipal Corporation	Himgauri Aher	Bharatiya Janata Party	2026	2031
17	Palghar	Vasai-Virar	Vasai-Virar Municipal Corporation	Ajiv Patil	Bahujan Vikas Aghadi	2026	2031
18	Parbhani	Parbhani	Parbhani Municipal Corporation	Syed Iqbal	Shiv Sena (UBT)	2026	2031
19	Pune	Pimpri-Chinchwad	Pimpri-Chinchwad Municipal Corporation	Ravi Landge	Bharatiya Janata Party	2026	2031
20	Pune	Pune	Pune Municipal Corporation	Manjusha Nagpure	Bharatiya Janata Party	2026	2031
21	Raigad	Panvel	Panvel Municipal Corporation	Nitin Patil	Bharatiya Janata Party	2026	2031
22	Sangli	Sangli	Sangli Municipal Corporation	Dheeraj Suryavanshi	Bharatiya Janata Party	2026	2031
23	Solapur	Solapur	Solapur Municipal Corporation	Vinayak Kondyal	Bharatiya Janata Party	2026	2031
24	Thane	Bhiwandi	Bhiwandi Municipal Corporation	Narayan Chaudhary	Independent	2026	2031
25	Thane	Kalyan-Dombivli	Kalyan-Dombivli Municipal Corporation	Harshali Chaudhari	Shiv Sena	2026	2031
26	Thane	Mira-Bhayandar	Mira-Bhayandar Municipal Corporation	Dimple Mehta	Bharatiya Janata Party	2026	2031
27	Thane	Navi Mumbai	Navi Mumbai Municipal Corporation	Sujata Patil	Bharatiya Janata Party	2026	2031
28	Thane	Thane	Thane Municipal Corporation	Sharmila Pimplolkar	Shiv Sena	2026	2031
29	Thane	Ulhasnagar	Ulhasnagar Municipal Corporation	Ashwini Nikam	Shiv Sena	2026	2031

==== Manipur ====
No.	District	City	Corporation	Mayor	Party	Elections	
No.	District	City	Corporation	Mayor	Party	Previous	Next
1	Imphal East	Imphal	Imphal Municipal Corporation	Administrative Control (Note: Term ended in 2024 prompting the corporation to be under administrative control.)		2016	2026
1	Imphal West	Imphal	Imphal Municipal Corporation	Administrative Control		2016	2026

==== Mizoram ====
No.	District	City	Corporation	Mayor	Party	Elections	
No.	District	City	Corporation	Mayor	Party	Previous	Next
1	Aizawl	Aizawl	Aizawl Municipal Corporation	H. Lalremtluanga	Zoram People's Movement	2026	2031

==== Odisha ====
No.	District	City	Corporation	Mayor	Party	Elections	
No.	District	City	Corporation	Mayor	Party	Previous	Next
1	Cuttack	Cuttack	Cuttack Municipal Corporation	Subhash Chandra Singh	Biju Janata Dal	2022	2027
2	Ganjam	Brahmapur	Berhampur Municipal Corporation	Sanghamitra Dalai	Biju Janata Dal	2022	2027
3	Khordha	Bhubaneswar	Bhubaneswar Municipal Corporation	Sulochana Das	Biju Janata Dal	2022	2027
4	Puri	Puri	Puri Municipal Corporation	Newly created			TBA
5	Sambalpur	Sambalpur	Sambalpur Municipal Corporation	Administrative Control (Note: Municipal Corporation was formed in 2014 but elections have never been held.)			TBA
6	Sundergarh	Rourkela	Rourkela Municipal Corporation	Administrative Control			TBA

==== Punjab ====
No.	District	City	Corporation	Mayor	Party	Elections	
No.	District	City	Corporation	Mayor	Party	Previous	Next
1	Amritsar	Amritsar	Amritsar Municipal Corporation	Jatinder Singh	Aam Aadmi Party	2024	2029
2	Barnala	Barnala	Barnala Municipal Corporation	Hasanpreet Bhardwaj	Aam Aadmi Party	2026	2031
3	Bathinda	Bathinda	Bathinda Municipal Corporation	Padamjeet Mehta	Aam Aadmi Party	2026	2031
4	Fazilka	Abohar	Abohar Municipal Corporation	Pooja Wadhwa	Bharatiya Janata Party	2026	2031
5	Gurdaspur	Batala	Batala Municipal Corporation	Bhupinder Singh Bajwa	Aam Aadmi Party	2026	2031
6	Hoshiarpur	Hoshiarpur	Hoshiarpur Municipal Corporation	Praveen Saini	Aam Aadmi Party	2026	2031
7	Jalandhar	Jalandhar	Jalandhar Municipal Corporation	Vaneet Dhir	Aam Aadmi Party	2024	2029
8	Kapurthala	Kapurthala	Kapurthala Municipal Corporation	Narinder Singh Manso	Aam Aadmi Party	2026	2031
9	Ludhiana	Ludhiana	Ludhiana Municipal Corporation	Inderjit Kaur	Aam Aadmi Party	2024	2029
10	Moga	Moga	Moga Municipal Corporation	Vinaypal Kaur	Aam Aadmi Party	2026	2031
11	Pathankot	Pathankot	Pathankot Municipal Corporation	TBA (Note: BJP is SLP in Pathankot with 22 wards, Congress won 18 wards and Aam Aadmi Party won 10 wards. When a party gets its mayor, it will be added)		2026	2031
12	Patiala	Patiala	Patiala Municipal Corporation	Kundan Gogia	Aam Aadmi Party	2024	2029
13	Sahibzada Ajit Singh Nagar	Mohali	Mohali Municipal Corporation	Sarabjit Singh Samana	Aam Aadmi Party	2026	2031

==== Rajasthan ====
No.	District	City	Corporation		Mayor	Party	Elections	
No.	District	City	Name	Wards	Mayor	Party	Previous	Next
1	Ajmer	Ajmer	Ajmer Municipal Corporation	80	Ananamika Sharma	Bharatiya Janata Party	2026	2031
2	Alwar	Alwar	Alwar Municipal Corporation	65	Sumanlata Agarwal	Bharatiya Janata Party	2026	2031
3	Bharatpur	Bharatpur	Bharatpur Municipal Corporation	65	Anuradha Singh	Bharatiya Janata Party	2026	2031
4	Bhilwara	Bhilwara	Bhilwara Municipal Corporation	70	Jaswant Kanwar	Bharatiya Janata Party	2026	2031
5	Bikaner	Bikaner	Bikaner Municipal Corporation	80	Anil Kalla	Indian National Congress	2026	2031
6	Jaipur	Jaipur	Jaipur Municipal Corporation	150	Sunil Kothari	Bharatiya Janata Party	2026	2031
7	Jodhpur	Jodhpur	Jodhpur Municipal Corporation	100	Prasannchand Mehta	Bharatiya Janata Party	2026	2031
8	Kota	Kota	Kota Municipal Corporation	100	Anusuya Goswami	Bharatiya Janata Party	2026	2031
9	Pali	Pali	Pali Municipal Corporation	65	Namita Bubkia	Bharatiya Janata Party	2026	2031
10	Udaipur	Udaipur	Udaipur Municipal Corporation	80	Paras Singhvi	Bharatiya Janata Party	2026	2031

==== Sikkim ====
No.	District	City	Corporation	Mayor	Party	Elections	
No.	District	City	Corporation	Mayor	Party	Previous	Next
1	Gangtok	Gangtok	Gangtok Municipal Corporation	Tsering Palden Bhutia	Sikkim Krantikari Morcha	2026	2031

==== Tamil Nadu ====
No.	District	City	Corporation	Mayor	Party	Elections	
No.	District	City	Corporation	Mayor	Party	Previous	Next
1	Chengalpattu	Tambaram	Tambaram Municipal Corporation	K. Vasanthakumari	Dravida Munnetra Kazhagam	2022	2027
2	Chennai	Chennai	Greater Chennai Corporation	Priya Rajan	Dravida Munnetra Kazhagam	2022	2027
3	Coimbatore	Coimbatore	Coimbatore Municipal Corporation	R. Ranganayaki	Dravida Munnetra Kazhagam	2022	2027
4	Cuddalore	Cuddalore	Cuddalore Municipal Corporation	R. Sundari	Dravida Munnetra Kazhagam	2022	2027
5	Dindigul	Dindigul	Dindigul Municipal Corporation	J. Ilamathi	Dravida Munnetra Kazhagam	2022	2027
6	Erode	Erode	Erode Municipal Corporation	S. Nagarathinam	Dravida Munnetra Kazhagam	2022	2027
7	Kanchipuram	Kanchipuram	Kanchipuram Municipal Corporation	M. Mahalakshmi	Dravida Munnetra Kazhagam	2022	2027
8	Kanyakumari	Nagercoil	Nagercoil Municipal Corporation	Mary Princy	Dravida Munnetra Kazhagam	2022	2027
9	Karur	Karur	Karur Municipal Corporation	Kavitha Ganesan	Dravida Munnetra Kazhagam	2022	2027
10	Krishnagiri	Hosur	Hosur Municipal Corporation	S. A. Sathya	Dravida Munnetra Kazhagam	2022	2027
11	Madurai	Madurai	Madurai Municipal Corporation	P. Indirani Ponvasanth	Dravida Munnetra Kazhagam	2022	2027
12	Namakkal	Namakkal	Namakkal Municipal Corporation	Newly created			2027
13	Pudukkottai	Pudukkottai	Pudukkottai Municipal Corporation	Newly created			2027
14	Salem	Salem	Salem Municipal Corporation	A. Ramachandran	Dravida Munnetra Kazhagam	2022	2027
15	Sivaganga	Karaikudi	Karaikudi Municipal Corporation	Newly created			2027
16	Thanjavur	Kumbakonam	Kumbakonam Municipal Corporation	K. Saravanan	Indian National Congress	2022	2027
17	Thanjavur	Thanjavur	Thanjavur Municipal Corporation	S. Ramanathan	Dravida Munnetra Kazhagam	2022	2027
18	Thoothukkudi	Thoothukkudi	Thoothukkudi Municipal Corporation	P. Jegan	Dravida Munnetra Kazhagam	2022	2027
19	Tiruchirappalli	Tiruchirappalli	Tiruchirappalli Municipal Corporation	M. Anbalagan	Dravida Munnetra Kazhagam	2022	2027
20	Tirunelveli	Tirunelveli	Tirunelveli Municipal Corporation	G. Ramakrishnan	Dravida Munnetra Kazhagam	2022	2027
21	Tiruppur	Tiruppur	Tiruppur Municipal Corporation	N. Dinesh Kumar	Dravida Munnetra Kazhagam	2022	2027
22	Tiruvallur	Avadi	Avadi Municipal Corporation	G. Udhayakumar	Dravida Munnetra Kazhagam	2022	2027
23	Tiruvannamalai	Tiruvannamalai	Tiruvannamalai Municipal Corporation	Newly created			2027
24	Vellore	Vellore	Vellore Municipal Corporation	Sujatha Anandakumar	Dravida Munnetra Kazhagam	2022	2027
25	Virudhunagar	Sivakasi	Sivakasi Municipal Corporation	I. Sangeetha	Dravida Munnetra Kazhagam	2022	2027

==== Telangana ====
No.	District	City	Corporation	Mayor	Party	Elections	
No.	District	City	Corporation	Mayor	Party	Previous	Next
1	Bhadradri Kothagudem	Kothagudem	Kothagudem Municipal Corporation	M. Ganesh	Communist Party of India	2026	2031
2	Hyderabad	Cyberabad	Cyberabad Municipal Corporation	Newly created (Note: Erstwhile GHMC was trifurcated into 76-ward CMC, 150-ward GHMC and 74-ward MMC)			2026
3	Hyderabad	Hyderabad	Greater Hyderabad Municipal Corporation	Newly created			2026
4	Karimnagar	Karimnagar	Karimnagar Municipal Corporation	Kolagani Srinivas	Bharatiya Janata Party	2026	2031
5	Khammam	Khammam	Khammam Municipal Corporation	Administrative Control (Note: Term ended in April 2026 prompting the corporation to be under administrative control.)		2021	2026
6	Mahabubnagar	Mahabubnagar	Mahabubnagar Municipal Corporation	G. Mamatha	Indian National Congress	2026	2031
7	Mancherial	Mancherial	Mancherial Municipal Corporation	Dharni Madhukar	Indian National Congress	2026	2031
8	Medchal-Malkajgiri	Malkajgiri	Malkajgiri Municipal Corporation	Newly created (Note: Erstwhile GHMC was trifurcated into 76-ward CMC, 150-ward GHMC and 74-ward MMC)			2026
9	Nalgonda	Nalgonda	Nalgonda Municipal Corporation	Chaitanya Reddy	Indian National Congress	2026	2031
10	Nizamabad	Nizamabad	Nizamabad Municipal Corporation	Umarani Mudiraj	Indian National Congress	2026	2031
11	Peddapalli	Ramagundam	Ramagundam Municipal Corporation	Mahankali Swamy	Indian National Congress	2026	2031
12	Warangal	Warangal	Greater Warangal Municipal Corporation	Administrative Control (Note: Term ended in April 2026 prompting the corporation to be under administrative control.)		2021	2026

==== Tripura ====
No.	District	City	Corporation	Mayor	Party	Elections	
No.	District	City	Corporation	Mayor	Party	Previous	Next
1	West Tripura	Agartala	Agartala Municipal Corporation	Dipak Majumder	Bharatiya Janata Party	2021	2026

==== Uttar Pradesh ====
No.	District	City	Corporation		Mayor	Party	Elections	
No.	District	City	Name	Wards	Mayor	Party	Previous	Next
1	Agra	Agra	Agra Municipal Corporation	100	Hemlata Divakar	Bharatiya Janata Party	2023	2028
2	Aligarh	Aligarh	Aligarh Municipal Corporation	90	Prashant Singhal	Bharatiya Janata Party	2023	2028
3	Ayodhya	Ayodhya	Ayodhya Municipal Corporation	60	Girish Pati Tripathi	Bharatiya Janata Party	2023	2028
4	Bareilly	Bareilly	Bareilly Municipal Corporation	80	Umesh Gautam	Bharatiya Janata Party	2023	2028
5	Firozabad	Firozabad	Firozabad Municipal Corporation	70	Kamini Rathore	Bharatiya Janata Party	2023	2028
6	Ghaziabad	Ghaziabad	Ghaziabad Municipal Corporation	100	Sunita Dayal	Bharatiya Janata Party	2023	2028
7	Gorakhpur	Gorakhpur	Gorakhpur Municipal Corporation	80	Manglesh Srivastava	Bharatiya Janata Party	2023	2028
8	Jhansi	Jhansi	Jhansi Municipal Corporation	60	Bihari Lal Arya	Bharatiya Janata Party	2023	2028
9	Kanpur Nagar	Kanpur	Kanpur Municipal Corporation	110	Pramila Pandey	Bharatiya Janata Party	2023	2028
10	Lucknow	Lucknow	Lucknow Municipal Corporation	110	Sushma Kharakwal	Bharatiya Janata Party	2023	2028
11	Mathura	Mathura–Vrindavan	Mathura–Vrindavan Municipal Corporation	70	Vinod Agarwal	Bharatiya Janata Party	2023	2028
12	Meerut	Meerut	Meerut Municipal Corporation	90	Harikant Ahluwalia	Bharatiya Janata Party	2023	2028
13	Moradabad	Moradabad	Moradabad Municipal Corporation	70	Vinod Agrawal	Bharatiya Janata Party	2023	2028
14	Prayagraj	Prayagraj	Prayagraj Municipal Corporation	100	Ganesh Kesarwani	Bharatiya Janata Party	2023	2028
15	Saharanpur	Saharanpur	Saharanpur Municipal Corporation	70	Ajay Kumar Singh	Bharatiya Janata Party	2023	2028
16	Shahjahanpur	Shahjahanpur	Shahjahanpur Municipal Corporation	60	Archana Verma	Bharatiya Janata Party	2023	2028
17	Varanasi	Varanasi	Varanasi Municipal Corporation	100	Ashok Tiwari	Bharatiya Janata Party	2023	2028

==== Uttarakhand ====
No.	District	City	Corporation		Mayor	Party	Elections	
No.	District	City	Name	Wards	Mayor	Party	Previous	Next
1	Almora	Almora	Almora Municipal Corporation	40	Ajay Verma	Bharatiya Janata Party	2025	2030
2	Dehradun	Dehradun	Dehradun Municipal Corporation	100	Saurabh Thapliyal	Bharatiya Janata Party	2025	2030
3	Dehradun	Rishikesh	Rishikesh Municipal Corporation	40	Shambhu Paswan	Bharatiya Janata Party	2025	2030
4	Haridwar	Haridwar	Haridwar Municipal Corporation	60	Kiran Jaisal	Bharatiya Janata Party	2025	2030
5	Haridwar	Roorkee	Roorkee Municipal Corporation	40	Anita Agrawal	Bharatiya Janata Party	2025	2030
6	Nainital	Haldwani	Haldwani Municipal Corporation	60	Gajraj Singh Bisht	Bharatiya Janata Party	2025	2030
7	Pauri Garhwal	Kotdwar	Kotdwar Municipal Corporation	40	Shailendra Singh Rawat	Bharatiya Janata Party	2025	2030
8	Pauri Garhwal	Srinagar	Srinagar Municipal Corporation	40	Arti Bhandari	Independent	2025	2030
9	Pithoragarh	Pithoragarh	Pithoragarh Municipal Corporation	40	Kalpana Devlal	Bharatiya Janata Party	2025	2030
10	Udham Singh Nagar	Kashipur	Kashipur Municipal Corporation	40	Deepak Bali	Bharatiya Janata Party	2025	2030
11	Udham Singh Nagar	Rudrapur	Rudrapur Municipal Corporation	40	Vikas Sharma	Bharatiya Janata Party	2025	2030

==== West Bengal ====
No.	District	City	Corporation		Mayor	Party	Elections	
No.	District	City	Name	Wards	Mayor	Party	Previous	Next
1	Darjeeling	Siliguri	Siliguri Municipal Corporation (Note: Municipal Corporation was dissolved in 2026 after Mayor Goutam Deb resigned on 19 June 2026.)	47	Administrative Control		2022	2027
2	Hooghly	Chandannagar	Chandannagar Municipal Corporation (Note: Municipal Corporation was dissolved in 2026 after all AITC councillors including the Mayor resigned.)	33	Administrative Control		2022	2027
3	Howrah	Howrah	Howrah Municipal Corporation (Note: Elections have not been held after 2013.)	68	Administrative Control		2013	2026
4	Kolkata	Kolkata	Kolkata Municipal Corporation (Note: Municipal Corporation was dissolved in 2026 after Mayor Firhad Hakim resigned on 5 June 2026.)	209	Administrative Control		2021	2026
5	North 24 Parganas	Bidhannagar	Bidhannagar Municipal Corporation (Note: Municipal Corporation was dissolved in 2026 after Mayor Krishna Chakraborty resigned.)	41	Administrative Control		2022	2027
6	Paschim Bardhaman	Asansol	Asansol Municipal Corporation (Note: Municipal Corporation was dissolved in 2026 citing irregularities in the corporation.)	106	Administrative Control		2022	2027
7	Paschim Bardhaman	Durgapur	Durgapur Municipal Corporation (Note: Elections have not been held after 2017.)	43	Administrative Control		2017	2026

=== Union Territories ===
==== Chandigarh ====
No.	District	City	Corporation		Mayor	Party	Elections	
No.	District	City	Name	Wards	Mayor	Party	Previous	Next
1	Chandigarh	Chandigarh	Chandigarh Municipal Corporation	35 (Note: There are a total of 45 seats in Chandigarh Municipal Corporation. However, only 35 wards have direct election. Rest are nominated seats and one seat is of Chandigarh's Lok Sabha MP.)	Saurabh Joshi	Bharatiya Janata Party	2021	2026

==== Delhi ====
No.	District	City	Corporation		Mayor	Party	Elections	
No.	District	City	Name	Wards	Mayor	Party	Previous	Next
1	Delhi	Delhi	Municipal Corporation of Delhi	250	Pravesh Wahi	Bharatiya Janata Party	2022	2027

==== Jammu and Kashmir ====
No.	District	City	Corporation		Mayor	Party	Elections	
No.	District	City	Name	Wards	Mayor	Party	Previous	Next
1	Jammu	Jammu	Jammu Municipal Corporation	75	Administrative Control (Note: Terms ended in 2023 prompting the corporation to be under administrative control.)		2018	2026
2	Srinagar	Srinagar	Srinagar Municipal Corporation	74	Administrative Control		2018	2026

== City-wise lists of mayors ==
- List of mayors of Ahmedabad
- List of mayors of Ahmednagar
- List of mayors of Ayodhya
- List of mayors of Bengaluru
- List of mayors of Bhopal
- List of mayors of Chennai
- List of mayors of Coimbatore
- List of mayors of Firozabad
- List of mayors of Hyderabad
- List of mayors of Kanpur
- List of mayors of Kolkata
- List of mayors of Kozhikode
- List of mayors of Lucknow
- List of mayors of Moradabad
- List of mayors of Mumbai
- List of mayors of Nagpur
- List of mayors of Prayagraj
- List of mayors of Pune
- List of mayors of Salem, Tamil Nadu
- List of mayors of Srinagar
- List of mayors of Surat
- List of mayors of Varanasi
- List of mayors of Vijayawada
- List of mayors of Yanam

== See also ==
- List of the youngest mayors in India
- List of municipal corporations in India
