= 2023 Lucknow Municipal Corporation election =

2023 Elections for electing all 110 councilors of LMC

- 4 May 2023

All 110 seats of Lucknow Municipal Corporation 56 seats needed for a majority
- Turnout: 36.97% (▼13.53%)
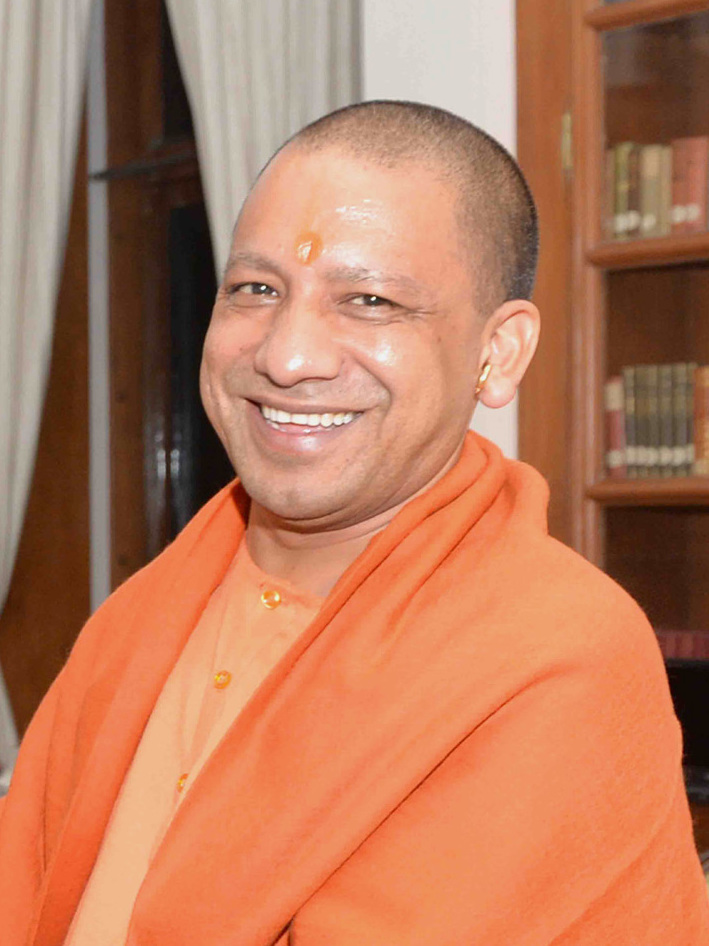

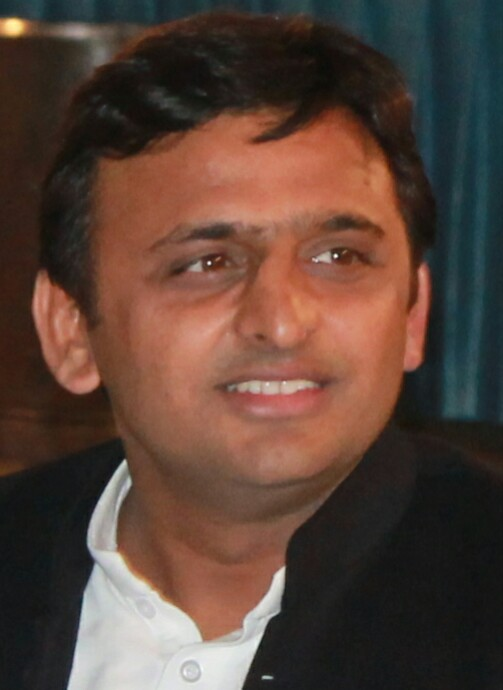

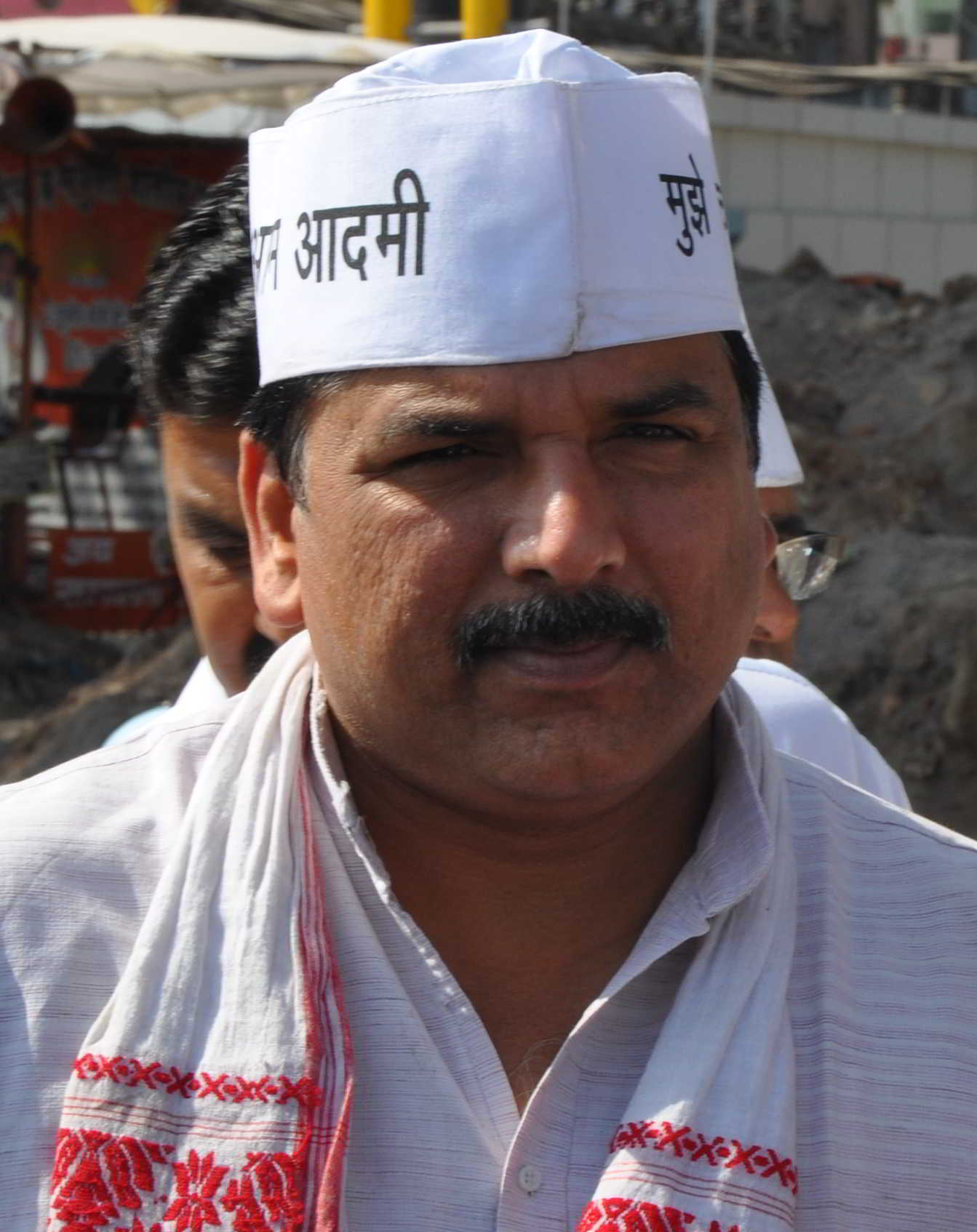

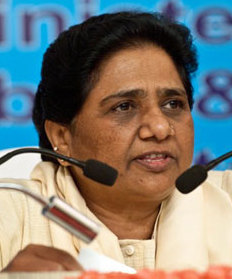
	First party	Second party	Third party
Leader	Yogi Adityanath	Akhilesh Yadav	Brijlal Khabri
Party	BJP	SP	INC
Alliance	NDA	SP+	UPA
Last election	57 seats	31 seats	8 seats
Seats before	58 seats	28 seats	8 seats
Seats won	80 seats	21 seats	4 seats
Seat change	▲23	▼10	▼4
	Fourth party	Fifth party
Leader	Sanjay Singh	Mayawati
Party	AAP	BSP
Alliance	None	None
Last election	Did not contest	2
Seats before	0 seats	2 seats
Seats won	0 seats	1
Seat change	Steady	▼1
Mayor before election
Sanyukta Bhatia
BJP
Elected mayor
Sushma Kharakwal
BJP

The Municipal Corporation election held in Lucknow City on 4 May 2023 for electing the members (corporators) and mayor of Lucknow Municipal Corporation which governs Lucknow, the capital and the largest city of the Indian state of Uttar Pradesh.

The votes were counted and the result was declared on 13 May 2023 in which the BJP again won the simple majority and formed the gorvenment in the city with Shushma Kharakwal as mayor.

== Background ==
After the 2017 LMC elections, Sanyukta Bhatia of Bharatiya Janata Party who got about 41.94% of total votes cast in the election became the first female mayor of Lucknow with the absolute majority of NDA in the house.

There were 14 candidates who won independently from their wards in the 2017 LMC elections.

The delimitation process was done by SEC after which the number of wards is the same as it was earlier, but several wards have been bifurcated and many of the wards are merged into a single. The Lucknow Mayoral seat was again given women reservation this time by the commission like in the previous elections in 2017.

There was a delay in conducting elections because of 3 months of stay order from Supreme Court to the decision of Allahabad High Court to have elections without OBC reservation. The Supreme Court gave judgement in the side of the state government and ordered to have elections with OBC reservation.

The date of dissolution of the house was 20 January 2023, there was an administrator period in the city till the election were done completely i.e 13 May 2023.

== Schedule ==
Election Event	Schedule
Date of issue of notification of election	11 April 2023
Last date of filling nomination	17 April 2023
Scrutiny of nominations	18 April 2023
Last date for withdrawal of nomination	20 April 2023
Date of allotting symbols	21 April 2023
Date of poll	4 May 2023
Date of counting of votes and Result Declaration	13 May 2023

Source-

== Parties and alliances ==
=== National Democratic Alliance ===
No.	Party	Flag	Symbol	Leader	Photo	Seats Contested
1.	Bharatiya Janata Party			Chaudhary Bhupendra Singh		110

=== Samajwadi Party+ ===
No.	Party	Flag	Symbol	Leader	Photo	Seat Contested
1.	Samajwadi Party			Akhilesh Yadav		110

=== United Progressive Alliance ===
No.	Party	Flag	Symbol	Leader	Photo	Seats Contested
1.	Indian National Congress			Priyanka Gandhi Vadra		110

=== Others ===
No.	Party	Flag	Symbol	Leader	Photo	Seats Contested
1.	Aam Aadmi Party			Sanjay Singh		110
2.	Bahujan Samaj Party			Mayawati		110

== Mayoral Candidates ==
No.	Party	Symbol	Candidate's Name
(1)	Bharatiya Janata Party		Sushma Kharkwal
(2)	Samajwadi Party		Vandana Mishra
(3)	Aam Aadmi Party		Anju Bhatt
(4)	Indian National Congress		Sangeeta Jaiswal
(5)	Bahujan Samaj Party		Shahin Bano

== Results ==
Vote share of the different parties in the election.
1. BJP (48.5%)
2. SP (28.8%)
3. INC (9.91%)
4. BSP (7.34%)
5. AAP (2.43%)
6. IND (2.34%)

=== Mayor Election ===
Party	Candidate	Votes	%	±%
BJP	Sushma Kharakwal	502,660	48.52	
SP	Vandana Mishra	2,98,519	28.81	
INC	Sangeeta Jaiswal	1,02,633	9.91	
BSP	Shaheen Bano	75,997	7.34	
AAP	Anju Bhatt	25,206	2.43	
Independent	Other Independents	24,241	2.34	
Margin of victory		2,04,141	19.71	▲5.11
Turnout		10,29,256		
BJP hold		Swing		

=== Elected corporators of the different parties ===
80	21	4	1	4
BJP	SP	INC	BSP	IND

Ward		Elected Candidate	
No.	Name	Name	Party
1	Shraddhya Atal Bihari Vajpayee	Chandawati	Samajwadi Party
2	Sharda Nagar - II	Draupadi	Bharatiya Janata Party
3	Ibrahimpur - II	Muskan Bharti	Samajwadi Party
4	Ibrahimpur - I	Brij Mohan Sharma	Bharatiya Janata Party
5	Raja Bijli Pasi - II	Pinki	Bharatiya Janata Party
6	Raja Bijli Pasi - I	Rajni Yadav	Samajwadi Party
7	Lal Ji Tandon	Roshini	Bharatiya Janata Party
8	Ambedkar Nagar	Shubhash Chandra	Samajwadi Party
9	Kalyan Singh	Asha Rawat	Samajwadi Party
10	Sarojini Nagar - I	Geeta Devi	Bharatiya Janata Party
11	Shaheed Bhagar Singh - II	Ramu	Samajwadi Party
12	Kargapur Sarsava	Rajesh Kumar	Samajwadi Party
13	Shaheed Bhagar Singh - I	Yogyata Yadav	Bharatiya Janata Party
14	Bharwara Malhaur	Mamta Rawat	Samajwadi Party
15	Lal Bahadur Shastri - I	Surendra Kumar Valmiki	Independent
16	Faizullaganj - IV	Ramu	Bharatiya Janata Party
17	Vikramaditya - Mahatama Gandhi	Amit Chaudhary	Bahujan Samaj Party
18	Sarojini Nagar - II	Ram Naresh	Bharatiya Janata Party
19	Sharda Nagar - I	Himanshu Ambedkar	Bharatiya Janata Party
20	New Haiderganj - III	Vinod Kumar Yadav	Bharatiya Janata Party
21	Malviya Nagar	Mamta Chaudhary	Indian National Congress
22	Jankipuram - III	Dipak Kumar Lodhi	Bharatiya Janata Party
23	Gurunanak Nagar	Piyush Diwan	Bharatiya Janata Party
24	Saadatganj	Shiv Kumar Yadav	Bharatiya Janata Party
25	Babu Kunj Bihari - Omnagar	Sarita Mishra	Bharatiya Janata Party
26	Aishbagh	Sandeep Sharma	Bharatiya Janata Party
27	Balaganj	Kamlesh Kumari Diwedi	Bharatiya Janata Party
28	Rammohan Rai	Madhu Singh	Bharatiya Janata Party
29	Kharika - II	Rajni Awasthi	Bharatiya Janata Party
30	Kharika - I	Krishna Narayan Singh	Bharatiya Janata Party
31	Jankipuram - I	Nisha Tiwari	Bharatiya Janata Party
32	Alamnagar	Rekha Singh	Bharatiya Janata Party
33	Lalkuan	Shushil Kumar Tiwari	Bharatiya Janata Party
34	Hazratganj - Ramtirth	Nagendra Singh Chauhan	Bharatiya Janata Party
35	Hind Nagar	Saurabh Singh 'Monu'	Bharatiya Janata Party
36	Kesari Kheda	Devendra Singh Yadav	Samajwadi Party
37	Gomti Nagar	Kaushal Shankar Pandey	Indian National Congress
38	Kanhaiya - Madhavpur - II	Md. Shakir	Independent
39	New Haiderganj - II	Dharmendra Kumar Singh	Bharatiya Janata Party
40	Indira Priyadarshini	Kalpana Verma	Bharatiya Janata Party
41	Ram Ji Lal - Sardar Patel Nagar	Sandhya Mishra	Bharatiya Janata Party
42	Shankarpurva - II	Shivam Upadhya	Bharatiya Janata Party
43	Ismailganj - II	Ranjana Awasthi	Bharatiya Janata Party
44	Faizullaganj - II	Priyanka	Bharatiya Janata Party
45	Guru Govind Singh	Shravan Nayak	Bharatiya Janata Party
46	Kunwar Jyoti Prasad	Gauri Sanvariya	Bharatiya Janata Party
47	Daliganj - Niralanagar	Abhilasha Katiyar	Bharatiya Janata Party
48	Faizullaganj - I	Rashmi Singh	Bharatiya Janata Party
49	Mahakavi Jai Shankar Prasad	Swadesh Singh	Bharatiya Janata Party
50	Chinhat - I	Arun Kumar Rai	Bharatiya Janata Party
51	Ismailganj - I	Mukesh Singh Chauhan	Indian National Congress
52	Kanhaiya - Madhavpur - I	Ram Naresh Chaurasiya	Samajwadi Party
53	Mahanagar	Harishchandra Lodhi	Bharatiya Janata Party
54	Geetapalli	Richa Mishra	Bharatiya Janata Party
55	Rani Laxmi Bai	Shafikur Rehman	Samajwadi Party
56	Vidhya Vati	Kaushalendra Diwedi	Bharatiya Janata Party
57	Babu Banarsi Das	Ashish Kumar Hitaishi	Bharatiya Janata Party
58	Moti Lal Nehru - Chandra Bhanu Gupta Nagar	Charanjit Gandhi	Bharatiya Janata Party
59	Colvin College - Nishatganj	Pramod Singh	Bharatiya Janata Party
60	Vidhya Vati - III	Nirmala Singh	Bharatiya Janata Party
61	Tilak Nagar - Kundari Rakabganj	Rajiv Bajpayee	Bharatiya Janata Party
62	Rafi Ahmed Kidwai	Malti Yadav	Bharatiya Janata Party
63	Ayodhya Das - II	Awdhesh Tripathi	Bharatiya Janata Party
64	Vidhya Vati - I	Pratima Tiwari	Bharatiya Janata Party
65	Chitragupta Nagar	Narendra Kumar	Bharatiya Janata Party
66	Chinhat - II	Shailendra Verma	Bharatiya Janata Party
67	Lala Lajpat Rai	Raghav Ram Tiwari	Bharatiya Janata Party
68	Babu Jagjivan Ram	Bhrigunath Shukla	Bharatiya Janata Party
69	J.C. Bose	Yavar Hussain Reshu	Samajwadi Party
70	Paper Mill Colony	Rajesh Singh	Bharatiya Janata Party
71	Mankameshwar Mandir	Ranjit Singh	Bharatiya Janata Party
72	Shankarpurva - III	Umesh Chandra Sanval	Bharatiya Janata Party
73	Faizullaganj - III	Pradeep Kumar Shukla	Bharatiya Janata Party
74	Jankipuram - II	Rajkumari Maurya	Bharatiya Janata Party
75	Bhartendu Harishchandra	Man Singh Yadav	Bharatiya Janata Party
76	Rajiv Gandhi - I	Sanjay Rathore	Bharatiya Janata Party
77	Maithlisharan Gupta	Ashok Kumar Upadhya	Independent
78	Labor Colony	Ajay Dixit	Bharatiya Janata Party
79	Rajajipuram	Kaumudi Tripathi	Bharatiya Janata Party
80	Indira Nagar	Puja Jaswani	Bharatiya Janata Party
81	Mallahi Tola - II	Gulshan Abbas	Samajwadi Party
82	Triveni Nagar	Dev Sharma Mishra	Bharatiya Janata Party
83	New Haiderganj - I	Rajnii Gupta	Bharatiya Janata Party
84	Kadam Rasool	Mohd. Nadeem	Samajwadi Party
85	Mallahi Tola - I	CB Singh	Bharatiya Janata Party
86	Lohia Nagar	Rajesh Mishra	Bharatiya Janata Party
87	Gola Ganj	Mohd. Haleem	Samajwadi Party
88	Bashiratganj - Ganeshganj	Girish Gupta	Bharatiya Janata Party
89	Sheetla Devi	Anoop Kamal Saxena	Bharatiya Janata Party
90	Rajendra Nagar	Rajesh Kumar Dixit	Bharatiya Janata Party
91	Vivekanand Puri	Nupur Shankghar	Bharatiya Janata Party
92	Shankarpurva - I	Namita Yadav	Samajwadi Party
93	Husainabad	Lubana Ali	Bharatiya Janata Party
94	Daulatganj	Rani Kanaujia	Bharatiya Janata Party
95	Maulvi Ganj	Mukesh Singh 'Monti'	Bharatiya Janata Party
96	Lal Bahadur Shashtri - II	Bhupendra Kumar Sharma	Bharatiya Janata Party
97	Gadhi Pir Khan	Shaista Parveen	Independent
98	Yadunath Sanyal - Nazarbagh	Kaamran Beg	Samajwadi Party
99	Acharya Narendra Dev	Manish Rastogi	Bharatiya Janata Party
100	Rajiv Gandhi - II	Arun Kumar Tiwari	Bharatiya Janata Party
101	Amberganj	Saba Ahsan Mansuri	Samajwadi Party
102	Maulana Kalbe Abid	Ifham Ullah	Indian National Congress
103	Mashakganj - Wazirganj	Mohd. Naeem	Samajwadi Party
104	Yahiaganj - Netaji Subhash Chandra Bose	Narendra Sharma	Bharatiya Janata Party
105	Kashmiri Mohalla	Laeek Aaga	Samajwadi Party
106	Chowk - Bazar Kali Ji	Anurag Mishra 'Annu'	Bharatiya Janata Party
107	Raja - Bazar	Rahul Mishra	Bharatiya Janata Party
108	Bhawaniganj	Reeta Rai	Bharatiya Janata Party
109	Aliganj	Prithvi Gupta	Bharatiya Janata Party
110	Ayodhya Das - I	Musbbor Ali Manshu	Samajwadi Party

== See also ==
- 2023 elections in India
- List of mayors of Lucknow
- Lucknow Municipal Corporation
- Lucknow
