= 2025 Chhattisgarh local elections =

Elections in Chhattisgarh, India

2025 Chhattisgarh local bodies elections
- 11 February 2025
- 173 municipalities in Chhattisgarh
Party	Leader	Vote %	Seats	+/–
BJP	Kiran Singh Deo	56	126	+83
INC	Deepak Baij	31.25	30	−33
BSP	Hemant Poyam	3.36	01	New
AAP	Komal Hopendi	1.06	01	New
JCC	Amit Jogi	0.4	0	−21
Independents		7.73	15	+4
This lists parties that won seats. See the complete results below.

2025 Chhattisgarh local bodies elections were held on 11 February 2025 to elect members of local bodies in Chhattisgarh. The counting of votes for 10 Municipal Corporation, 49 Nagar Palikas, 114 Nagar Panchayats were declared on 15th February 2025.

In the results of the municipal elections, the Bharatiya Janata Party secured victory in 126 out of 173 local bodies, while the Indian National Congress got 30 seats. Independents led in 15 bodies, while the Bahujan Samaj Party and the Aam Aadmi Party won one each. The Janta Congress Chhattisgarh did not get any seats. In all 10 municipal corporations, including the state capital Raipur, BJP's mayoral candidates emerged victorious. For the first time in approximately 111 years, the BJP won in Kanker Nagar Panchayat.

== Election schedule ==
Poll Event	Schedule
Notification Date	17 January 2025
Last Date for filing nomination	28 January 2025
Scrutiny of nomination	29 January 2025
Last Date for Withdrawal of nomination	31 January 2025
Allotment of Symbols	31 January 2025
Date of Poll	11 February 2025
Date of Counting of Votes	15 February 2025

== Voter turnout ==
District	Turnout (%)
Raipur	51.37 (lowest)
Bilaspur	51.37 (lowest)
Jashpur	75.58
Mungeli	72.53
Janjgir-Champa	77.58
Sakti	81.44
Kawardha	64.04
Raigarh	81.44
Sarangarh-Bilaigarh	78.52
Surajpur	66.15
Balrampur	79.85
Surguja	64.85
Gaurela-Pendra-Marwahi	71.41
Mahasamund	70.48
Dhamtari	76.10
Kanker	76.31
Kabirdham	77.44
Bastar	70.43
Durg	67.96
Narayanpur	70.71
Balod	75.34
Kondagaon	81.13
Rajnandgaon	75.82
Dantewada	72.52
Koriya	84.99 (highest)
Khairagarh	83.50
Sukma	66.97
Bijapur	58.71
Korba	74.10
Total	72.44

== Parties and Alliance ==
Alliance/Party	Flag	Symbol	Leader	Seats Contested
Bharatiya Janata Party			Kiran Singh Deo	173
Indian National Congress			Deepak Baij	173
Bahujan Samaj Party			Hemant Poyam	173

== Candidates ==
=== Mayoral Election ===
- On 26 January 2025, BJP released list of mayoral candidates.
- On 27 January 2025, INC released list of mayoral candidates.

No.	Municipal Corporation	District	BJP candidate	INC candidate
1	Ambikapur Municipal Corporation	Sarguja	Manjusha Bhagat	Ajay Tirkey
2	Durg Municipal Corporation	Durg	Alka Baghmar	Premlata Sahu
3	Bilaspur Municipal Corporation	Bilaspur	Pooja Vidhani	Pramod Nayak
4	Raipur Municipal Corporation	Raipur	Meenal Choubey	Deepti Dubey
5	Chirmiri Municipal Corporation	Koriya	Ram Naresh Rai	Vinay Jaiswal
6	Dhamtari Municipal Corporation	Dhamtari	Jagadish Ramu Mehra	— (Note: Congress candidate Vijay Golchha's candidature was rejected.)
7	Jagdalpur Municipal Corporation	Bastar	Sanjay Pandey	Malkeet Singh Gaidu
8	Rajnandgaon Municipal Corporation	Rajnandgaon	Madhusudan Yadav	Nikhil Dwivedi
9	Korba Municipal Corporation	Korba	Sanju Devi Rajput	Usha Tiwari
10	Raigarh Municipal Corporation	Raigarh	Jeevardhan Chauhan	Janki Katju

== Municipal general election results ==
=== Party wise ===
Municipal general election results
Party	Mayors/Chairpersons		Corporators/ Councillors/ Ward Members	
Party	Seats	+/-	Seats	+/-
Bharatiya Janata Party	10	10 ▲	1868	▲1063
Indian National Congress	0	10 ▼	952	▼754
Bahujan Samaj Party	0	Steady	1	▲1
Independent	0	Steady	13	▼4
Total	10	Steady	3200	▲305

=== Body wise ===
Division	Seats					
Division	Seats	BJP	INC	BSP	AAP	IND
Municipal Corporation	10	10	0	0	0	0
Nagar Palika	49	35	8	0	1	5
Nagar Panchayat	114	81	22	1	0	10
Total	173	126	30	1	1	15

=== Municipal Corporation wise ===
No.	Municipal Corporation	District	Winning party	Elected Mayor
1	Ambikapur Municipal Corporation	Sarguja	Bharatiya Janata Party	Manjusha Bhagat
2	Durg Municipal Corporation	Durg	Bharatiya Janata Party	Alka Baghmar
3	Bilaspur Municipal Corporation	Bilaspur	Bharatiya Janata Party	Pooja Vidhani
4	Raipur Municipal Corporation	Raipur	Bharatiya Janata Party	Meenal Choubey
5	Chirmiri Municipal Corporation	Koriya	Bharatiya Janata Party	Ram Naresh Rai
6	Dhamtari Municipal Corporation	Dhamtari	Bharatiya Janata Party	Jagadish Ramu Mehra
7	Jagdalpur Municipal Corporation	Bastar	Bharatiya Janata Party	Sanjay Pandey
8	Rajnandgaon Municipal Corporation	Rajnandgaon	Bharatiya Janata Party	Madhusudan Yadav
9	Korba Municipal Corporation	Korba	Bharatiya Janata Party	Sanju Devi Rajput
10	Raigarh Municipal Corporation	Raigarh	Bharatiya Janata Party	Jeevardhan Chauhan
