= Kanausi =

Coordinates: 25°39′N 86°10′E

Kanausi lies in the Kesari Khera Ward of Lucknow Municipal Corporation. The ward's councilor lives in Kanausi. It was previously a village.
