= List of mayors of Lucknow =

Head of the civic body or government of Lucknow, India

Mayor of Lucknow
- Incumbent; Sushma Kharakwal since 26 May 2023
- Status: Head of the LMC
- Member of: Lucknow Municipal Corporation
- Seat: Lucknow Municipal Corporation Headoffice, Lalbagh, Lucknow
- Appointer: Elected by voters
- Term length: 5 years
- Formation: 1960 (66 years ago)
- First holder: Dr SC Rai
- Deputy: Deputy Mayor
- Website: lmc.up.nic.in

The Mayor of Lucknow is the head of Lucknow Municipal Corporation in Lucknow, Uttar Pradesh, India. The mayor is the first citizen of the city. The mayor plays a decorative role of representing and upholding the dignity of the city and a functional role in deliberating over the discussions in the corporation. The role of the mayor is largely ceremonial.

The city is divided into 110 wards, each of them headed by a corporators who work under the mayor. In addition to the 110 councilors, there are Deputy Commissioners and Heads of various departments and Zonal officers.

Sushma Kharakwal is the current mayor of the city since 26 May 2023. She has been elected in the 2023 LMC elections and is the second consecutive female mayor of the city.

== Election of the mayor ==
The mayor is elected from within the ranks of the council in a quinquennial election. The elections are conducted in all 110 wards in the city to elect corporators together of this the people also vote for the mayor. The out of mayoral who gets the maximum vote in the elections get elected as the mayor of the city,

The tenure of the mayor is of 5 years or till dissolution of municipal corporation, either by themselves or by state law.

== List of mayors of LMC ==
Sr No.	Name	Term start	Term ended	Duration	Notes
City Head of Lucknow Municipal Board
1	Raj Kumar Srivastava	1 February 1960	1 February 1961	1 year, 0 days	First City Head of Lucknow
2	Giriraj Sharan Rastogi	2 February 1961	1 May 1962	1 year, 88 days	
3	Dr Purshottam Das Kapoor	2 May 1962	1 May 1963	364 days	
(3)	Dr Purshottam Das Kapoor	2 May 1963	1 May 1964	365 days	
4	Captain VR Mohan	2 May 1964	1 May 1965	364 days	Owner of Mohan Meakins
5	Om Narayan Bansal	2 May 1965	30 June 1966	1 year, 59 days	
Administrator Period		1 July 1966	4 July 1968	2 years, 3 days	
6	Dr Madan Mohan Singh Siddhu	4 July 1968	30 June 1969	361 days	A practicing physician of Charbagh
7	Balak Ram Vaishya	1 July 1969	30 June 1970	364 days	Protege of Chief Minister CB Gupta
8	Beni Prasad Halwasiya	1 July 1970	30 June 1971	364 days	Businessman of Hazratganj
9	Dr Dauji Gupta	5 July 1971	30 June 1972	361 days	Candidate of Chief Minister CB Gupta
(9)	Dr Dauji Gupta	1 July 1972	30 June 1973	364 days	
Administrator Period		30 June 1973	26 August 1989	16 years, 57 days	
(9)	Dr Dauji Gupta	26 August 1989	27 May 1992	2 years, 275 days	
Administrator Period		27 May 1992	13 May 1993	351 days	
10	Dr. Akhilesh Das Gupta	13 May 1993	30 November 1995	2 years, 201 days	
11	Dr SC Rai	1 December 1995	30 November 2000	4 years, 365 days	
(11)	Dr SC Rai	1 December 2000	21 November 2002	1 year, 355 days	
Mayors of Lucknow Municipal Corporation
1	Dr SC Rai	21 November 2002	13 February 2006	3 years, 84 days	First Mayor of the city
Administrator Period		13 February 2006	14 November 2006	274 days	
2	Dr Dinesh Sharma	14 November 2006	23 February 2011	4 years, 101 days	
Administrator Period		23 February 2011	14 July 2012	1 year, 142 days	
(2)	Dr Dinesh Sharma	14 July 2012	19 March 2017	4 years, 248 days	Left office to be the part of First Yogi Aditynath ministry and became deputy chief minister of the state.
3	Suresh Chandra Awasthi (Acting)	24 March 2017	11 August 2017	140 days	
Administrator Period		11 August 2017	12 December 2017	123 days	
4	Sanyukta Bhatia	12 December 2017	19 January 2023	5 years, 38 days	First woman mayor of the city
Administrator Period		20 January 2023	25 May 2023	125 days	
5	Sushma Kharakwal	26 May 2023	-	3 years, 104 days	

== See also ==
- 2022 Lucknow Municipal Corporation election
- Lucknow Municipal Corporation
- 2017 Lucknow Municipal Corporation election
- Mayors of Indian cities
