= 2025 Korba Municipal Corporation election =

Election to the municipal corporation of Korba, Chhattisgarh in India

- 11 February 2025

All 67 seats in the Korba Municipal Corporation 34 seats needed for a majority

	Majority party	Minority party	Third party
Leader	Sanju Devi Rajput	Usha Tiwari	none
Party	BJP	INC	Independent
Last election	30	35	-
Seats won	45	11	11
Seat change	15 ▲	24 ▼
Mayor before election
Rajkishore Prasad
INC
Elected mayor
Sanju Devi Rajput
BJP

The 2025 Korba Municipal Corporation (KMC) election was held on February 11, 2025, to elect the mayor and councilors who would govern Korba, the power city of Chhattisgarh, India. This election was part of the broader municipal elections taking place across the state.

BJP won the mayoral race by over 48 thousand votes and secured 45 of the 67 wards.

== Election schedule ==
The State Election Commission of Chhattisgarh announced the dates for election on 17 January 2025.

Poll Event	Schedule
Notification Date	17 January 2025
Last Date for filing nomination	28 January 2025
Scrutiny of nomination	29 January 2025
Last Date for Withdrawal of nomination	31 January 2025
Allotment of Symbols	31 January 2025
Date of Poll	11 February 2025
Date of Counting of Votes	15 February 2025

== Candidates ==
=== Mayoral election ===
No.	Party	Symbol	Candidate's Name
1	Bharatiya Janata Party		Sanju Devi Rajput
2	Indian National Congress		Usha Tiwari

== Results ==
=== Mayoral election ===
2025 Korba Municipal Corporation Election: Mayor
Party	Candidate	Votes	%	±%
BJP	Sanju Devi Rajput	'93,587'		
INC	Usha Tiwari	45,471		
NOTA	None of the above			
Majority		48,116		
Turnout				

=== Result by party in wards ===
Party	Popular vote			Seats		
Party	Votes	%	±pp	Contested	Won	+/−
Bharatiya Janata Party				67	45	
Indian National Congress				67	11	
Independents					11	
NOTA						
Total					67	
