= Sushma Kharakwal =

Indian politician

5th Mayor of Lucknow
- Incumbent
- Assumed office 26 May 2023
- Preceded by: Sanyukta Bhatia

Personal details
- Party: Bharatiya Janata Party
- Profession: Politician

Sushma Kharakwal is an Indian politician from Lucknow who is currently serving as the mayor of Lucknow Municipal Corporation from 26 May 2023.

She won the 2023 LMC elections held in May representing the Bharatiya Janata Party.

== Early life ==
Kharakwal is from Uttarakhand but settled in Lucknow, Uttar Pradesh. She is a Pahadi Brahmin and her husband, Prem Kharakwal, is a retired havildar from Indian army. Together, they have two sons, Manish and Mayank.

She did her graduation at a college affiliated with Srinagar Garhwal University, Uttarakhand. She is a BJP worker for 30 years. She served as the president of the Avadh region Mahila Morcha and was also a member of the Sainik Welfare Board and Railway Users Advisory Committee.

== Career ==
Kharakwal represented the BJP and won the mayoral election defeating her nearest rival Vandana Mishra of the Samajwadi Party by a margin of 20, 414 votes. She polled 335,035 votes. She won in 80 of the 110 wards.

=== Controversies ===
In January 2025, she made a controversial statement that 2 lakh Bangladeshis have entered Lucknow. Congress councillor Mukesh Singh Chauhan questioned her statement and demanded clarity on certain points. In August 2024, she allegedly threatened to throw the officials of the Municipal Corporation into the dirty drains, if they failed to keep them clean.
