= Satish Chandra Rai =

Indian surgeon (1929–2016)

Mayor of Lucknow
- In office 1 December 1995 – 13 February 2006
- Preceded by: Dr. Akhilesh Das Gupta
- Succeeded by: Dinesh Sharma
- Constituency: Lucknow

Personal details
- Born: 12 February 1929 Lucknow, United Provinces, British India
- Died: 28 August 2016 (aged 87) Lucknow, Uttar Pradesh, India
- Party: Bharatiya Janata Party
- Education: MBBS
- Profession: Doctor (Surgeon)

Satish Chandra Rai (12 February 1929 – 28 August 2016) was a surgeon from Uttar Pradesh. He was the first elected mayor of Lucknow and personal doctor to two Prime Ministers.
