= 2025 Bilaspur, Chhattisgarh Municipal Corporation election =

Election to the municipal corporation of Bilaspur, Chhattisgarh in India

2025 Bilaspur Municipal Corporation election
- 11 February 2025

All 70 seats in the Bilaspur Municipal Corporation 36 seats needed for a majority

	Majority party	Minority party	Third party
Leader	Pooja Vidhani	Pramod Nayak
Party	BJP	INC	Independent
Last election	30	35	-
Seats won	49	18	3
Seat change	19 ▲	17 ▼
Mayor before election
Ramsharan Yadav
INC
Elected mayor
Pooja Vidhani
BJP

The 2025 Bilaspur Municipal Corporation (BMC) election was held on February 11, 2025, to elect the mayor and councilors who would govern Bilaspur, the second largest city of Chhattisgarh, India. This election was part of the broader municipal elections taking place across the state.

The Bharatiya Janata Party delivered a remarkable performance in the Municipal Corporation elections. BJP candidate Pooja Vidhni won by a margin of more than 66 thousand votes. BJP also won 49 of the 70 wards of the corporation.

== Election schedule ==
The State Election Commission of Chhattisgarh announced the dates for election on 17 January 2025.

Poll Event	Schedule
Notification Date	17 January 2025
Last Date for filing nomination	28 January 2025
Scrutiny of nomination	29 January 2025
Last Date for Withdrawal of nomination	31 January 2025
Allotment of Symbols	31 January 2025
Date of Poll	11 February 2025
Date of Counting of Votes	15 February 2025

== Candidates ==
=== Mayoral election ===
No.	Party	Symbol	Candidate's Name
1	Bharatiya Janata Party		Pooja Vidhani
2	Indian National Congress		Pramod Nayak

== Results ==
=== Mayoral election ===
2025 Raipur Municipal Corporation Election: Mayor
Party	Candidate	Votes	%	±%
BJP	Pooja Vidhani	'152,011'		
INC	Pramod Nayak	85,944		
NOTA	None of the above	2,892		
Majority		66,067		
Turnout				

=== Result by party ===
Party	Popular vote			Seats		
Party	Votes	%	±pp	Contested	Won	+/−
Bharatiya Janata Party				70	49	
Indian National Congress				70	18	
Independents				no	3	
NOTA						
Total					70	
