= Agartala Municipal Corporation =

Local civic body in Agartala, Tripura, India

Type
- Type: Municipal Corporation
- Term limits: 5 years

Leadership
- Mayor: Dipak Majumder, BJP
- Deputy Mayor: Manika Das Datta, BJP
- Municipal Commissioner: Vishal Kumar, IAS

Structure
- Seats: 51
- Political groups: Government (51): BJP (51)

Elections
- Voting system: First-past-the-post
- Last election: 25 November 2021
- Next election: 27 November 2026

Meeting place
- Agartala, Tripura

Website
- amcservices.agartalasmartcityservices.in/amc/

The Agartala Municipal Corporation (AMC) is the municipal body which governs and maintains the city of Agartala, the capital of the Indian state of Tripura. Formed in the year 1871 as the oldest municipal body in Northeast India, AMC had a vital role in developing & modernizing the state and managing in its various activities. This civic administrative body administers an area of 76.5 km^{2}. AMC is headed by Dipak Majumder, who is serving as the present Mayor of Agartala.

== Objective ==
The Municipal Corporation consists of councillors elected by the residents of the city. The city is divided into municipal wards and each ward elects a councillor to the Council.

The current majority of AMC belongs to the Bharatiya Janata Party (BJP).

The municipal area was 16.012 km^{2} with a population of 1,89,329 at the 2001 census. The Urban Development Department Notification No.F.2(2)–UDD /2003 dated 2 July 2004 the Agartala Municipal Council has further been extended taking 16 No. of Grams of Dukli R.D.Block, 7 No. of Grams of Mohanpur R.D. Block and 2 No. of Grams of Jirania R.D. Block with an area of 42.83 square kilometers and a population of 178,495. The present municipal building is located near the City center of Agartala location namely Paradise Chowhamani.

Year	Population	Area
1961	54,878	3 square miles (8 km^{2})
1971	100,264	3 square miles (8 km^{2})
1981	132,186	10.94 km^{2}
1991	157,358	15.81 km^{2}
2001	188,540	16.02 km^{2}
2004	367,822	58.84 km^{2}
2011	399,688	58.84 km^{2} (Greater Agartala Planning Area: 512,264 and 92 km^{2})

An estimated value of the population of Agartala in each decades as shown here from 1961 along with its size in area.

== Members of the Mayor-in-Council ==
S.No	Name	Designation	Departments	Party
1.	Dipak Majumdar	Mayor	General Administration; Revenue; Market Development (including shopping complex); Other affairs not allocated to Members	BJP
2.	Smt. Manika Das Datta	Deputy Mayor	Accounts and Cash; Slum Development; Cultural affairs	BJP
Mayor-in-Council
3.	Hiralal Debnath	Member	Vehicle; PWD	BJP
4.	Tushar Kanti Bhattacharjee	Member	Public Health (excluding SWM); Drinking Water	BJP
5.	Smt. Himani Debbarma	Member	ST Development; ICDS	BJP
6.	Hari Sadhan Debnath	Member	Poverty alleviation (Housing Scheme); Sports	BJP
7.	Uday Bhaskar Chakraborty	Member	Electric; SWM	BJP
8.	Jagadish Das	Member	Municipal Properties; Literacy	BJP
9.	Smt. Sampa Sarkar Sen	Member	School Education; NULM	BJP
10.	Bapi Das	Member	TUEP; SC Development	BJP

== Current members ==
Agartala Municipal Corporation has a total of 51 members or corporators, who are directly elected after a term of 5 years. The council is led by the Mayor. The latest elections were held in November 2021. The current mayor of Agartala is Dipak Majumder of the Bharatiya Janata Party.

Mayor: Dipak Majumder
Deputy Mayor: Manika Das Datta
Ward No.	Name of Councillor	Party	Remarks
1	Mitra Rani Das	Bharatiya Janata Party	
2	Sharmistha Bardhan	Bharatiya Janata Party	
3	Jagadish Das	Bharatiya Janata Party	
4	Suparna Debnath	Bharatiya Janata Party	
5	Lata Nath	Bharatiya Janata Party	
6	Mithun Das Baishnab	Bharatiya Janata Party	
7	Jaya Dhanuk	Bharatiya Janata Party	
8	Sampa Sarkar	Bharatiya Janata Party	
9	Uttam Kumar Ghosh	Bharatiya Janata Party	
10	Soma Majumder	Bharatiya Janata Party	
11	Hiralal Debnath	Bharatiya Janata Party	
12	Santana Saha	Bharatiya Janata Party	
13	Pradip Chanda	Bharatiya Janata Party	
14	Snigdha Das	Bharatiya Janata Party	
15	Nibas Das	Bharatiya Janata Party	
16	Dipak Majumder	Bharatiya Janata Party	
17	Shikha Banerjee	Bharatiya Janata Party	
18	Abhishek Datta	Bharatiya Janata Party	
19	Bhaswati Debbarma	Bharatiya Janata Party	
20	Ratna Datta	Bharatiya Janata Party	
21	Alak Bhattacharjee	Bharatiya Janata Party	
22	Himani Debbarma	Bharatiya Janata Party	
23	Manimukta Bhattacharjee	Bharatiya Janata Party	
24	Sukhamoy Saha	Bharatiya Janata Party	
25	Sima Debnath	Bharatiya Janata Party	
26	Shilpi Dewan	Bharatiya Janata Party	
27	Subhash Bhowmik	Bharatiya Janata Party	
28	Nanda Dulal Debnath	Bharatiya Janata Party	
29	Ruma Das	Bharatiya Janata Party	
30	Pintu Ranjan Das	Bharatiya Janata Party	
31	Anjana Das	Bharatiya Janata Party	
32	Shilpi Sen	Bharatiya Janata Party	
33	Abhijit Mallik	Bharatiya Janata Party	
34	Jahnabai Das Chowdhury	Bharatiya Janata Party	
35	Tushar Kanti Bhattacharjee	Bharatiya Janata Party	
36	Nitu Dey	Bharatiya Janata Party	
37	Bapi Das	Bharatiya Janata Party	
38	Anjana Das	Bharatiya Janata Party	
39	Alok Roy	Bharatiya Janata Party	
40	Sampa Sarkar	Bharatiya Janata Party	
41	Abhijit Ghosh	Bharatiya Janata Party	
42	Sathi Rudra Paul	Bharatiya Janata Party	
43	Manika Das Datta	Bharatiya Janata Party	
44	Uday Bhaskar Chakraborty	Bharatiya Janata Party	
45	Apu Adya Datta	Bharatiya Janata Party	
46	Prasenjit Lodh	Bharatiya Janata Party	
47	Minarani Sarkar	Bharatiya Janata Party	
48	Sabita Kar	Bharatiya Janata Party	
49	Harisadhan Debnath	Bharatiya Janata Party	
50	Rinki Das	Bharatiya Janata Party	
51	Sushanta Chandra Bhowmik	Bharatiya Janata Party	

== Election ==
Date: 25 November 2021

Result: 28 November 2021

Total Seats : 51

Winning Party : BJP with 51 seats.

== See also ==
- List of cities and towns in Tripura
