= Dipak Majumder =

Indian politician

Member of the Tripura Legislative Assembly
- Incumbent
- Assumed office 2024
- Preceded by: Surajit Datta
- Constituency: Ramnagar

Mayor of Agartala
- Incumbent
- Assumed office 6 December 2021

Personal details
- Party: Bharatiya Janata Party

Dipak Majumder is an Indian politician serving as a Member of the Tripura Legislative Assembly since 2024. He has also served as Mayor of Agartala Municipal Corporation since 2021.
