= 2017 Lucknow Municipal Corporation election =

- 26 November 2017

All 110 seats of Lucknow Municipal Corporation 56 seats needed for a majority
- Turnout: 50.5%
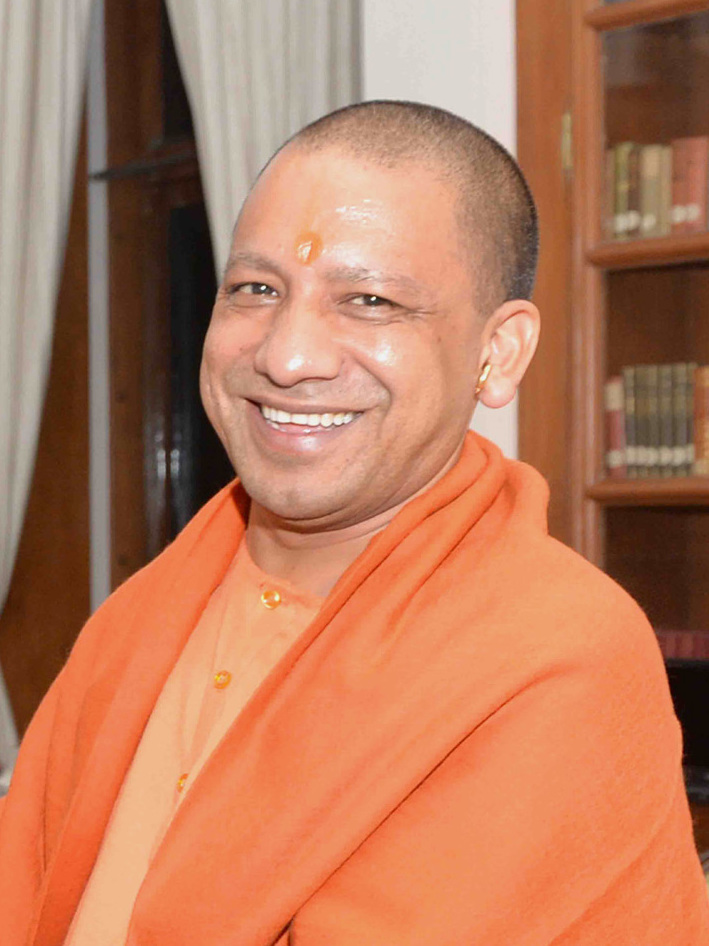

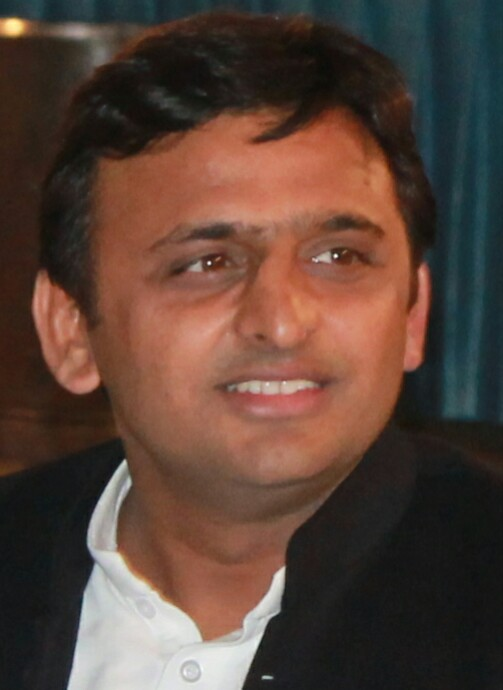

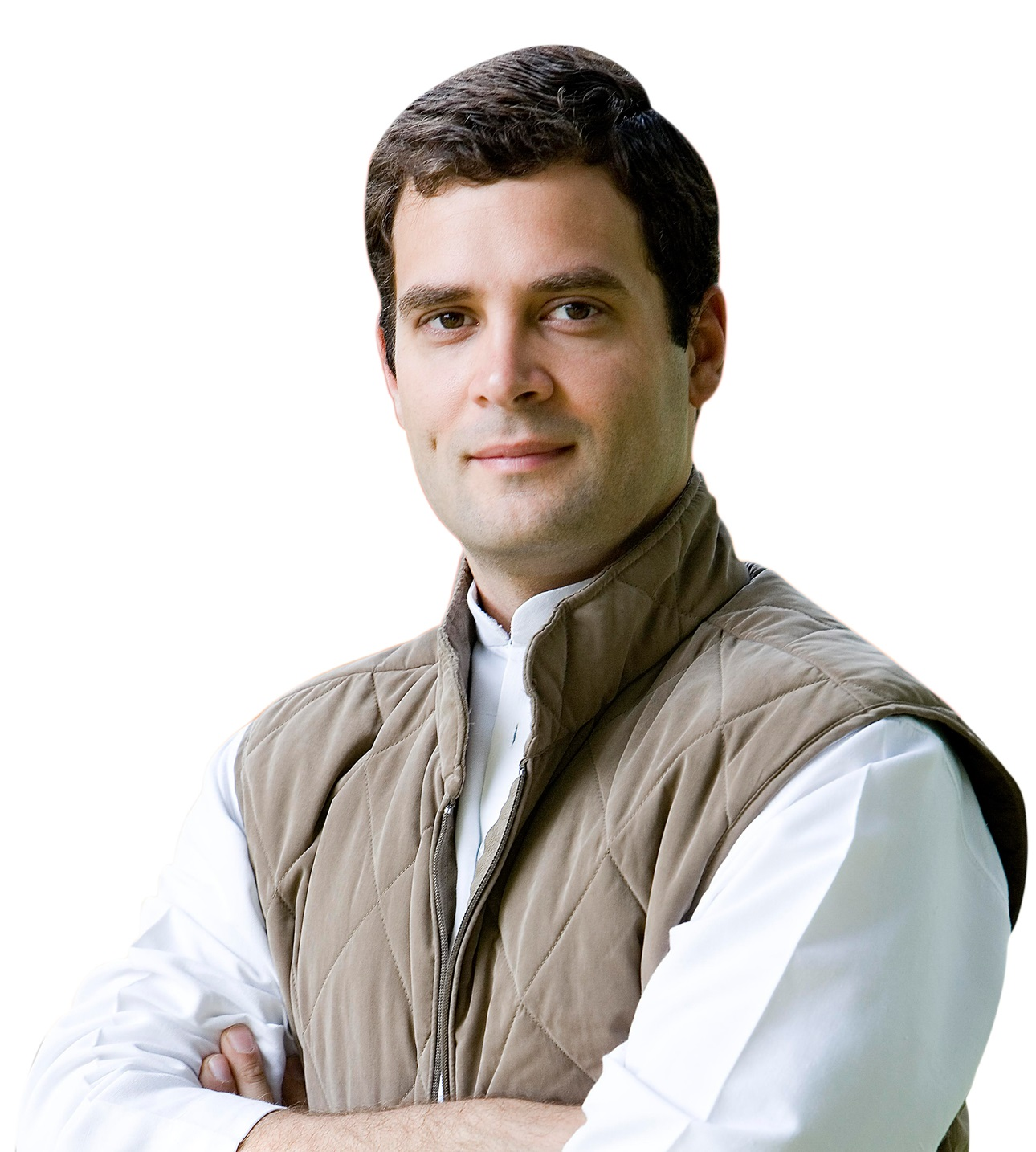
	First party	Second party	Third party
Leader	Yogi Adityanath	Akhilesh Yadav	Rahul Gandhi
Party	BJP	SP	INC
Alliance	NDA	SP+	UPA
Leader since	2017	2012	2014
Seats after	57	31	8
Mayor before election
Suresh Awasthi
BJP
Elected mayor
Sanyukta Bhatia
BJP

The 2017 Lucknow Municipal Corporation election was an election of members to the Lucknow Municipal Corporation which governs Lucknow, capital and the largest city of Indian state of Uttar Pradesh. It took place on 26 November 2017.

Total number of voters were 24,43,991 out of which 13,01,788 were male voters and 11,42,203 were female voters.

== Schedule ==
The elections of 2017 Lucknow Municipal Corporation were announced by the Uttar Pradesh State Election Commission.

The elections of LMC were held in single phase on 26 November 2017 and the results were announced on 1 December 2017.

Election Event	Schedule
Date of issue of notification	1-11-2017
Last date of nomination	7-11-2017
Scrutiny of nominations	8-11-2017
Last Date for withdrawal of nomination	10-11-2017
Date of allotting symbols	11-11-2017
Date of poll	26-11-2017
Announcement of result	1-12-2017

== Results ==
Results of LMC were announced on 1 December 2017 the Bharatiya Janata Party (BJP) lead NDA alliance won with absolute majority by winning 58 seats out of 110.

On 12 December 2017, the mayoral candidate of BJP, Sanyukta Bhatia sworn as the 14th and first female mayor of the LMC in last 100 years.

=== Corporator elections ===
S.No.	Party name	Party flag or symbol	Number of Corporators	Change
01	Bharatiya Janata Party (BJP)		58	▲14
02	Samajwadi Party (SP)		28	New
03	Indian National Congress (INC)		8	▼3
04	Bahujan Samaj Party (BSP)		2	New
05	Independents		14	▼40

== See also ==
- Lucknow Municipal Corporation
- 2017 elections in India
- 2017 Uttar Pradesh Legislative Assembly election
