= List of mayors of Bhopal =

Mayor of Bhopal Municipal Corporation
- Incumbent; Malti Rai since 8 July 2022
- Reports to: Chief Minister
- Residence: Bhopal, Madhya Pradesh, India
- Term length: 5 years or till next Election
- Formation: 1983

The Mayor of Bhopal is the leader of the city of Bhopal in Madhya Pradesh state of India. The mayor is the head of the Bhopal Municipal Corporation. The mayor is supported by a commissioner with executive powers. Malti Rai of the Bhartiya Janta Party became the city's tenth mayor in 2022.
