= Chhapra Municipal Corporation =

Civic body governing Chhapra, Bihar, India

Type
- Type: Municipal corporation

History
- Founded: 2017; 8 years ago

Leadership
- Mayor: Lakshmi Narayan gupta
- Deputy Mayor: Ragini Kumari
- Municipal Commissioner: Sanjay Kumar Upadhyay
- Seats: 45

Elections
- Last election: 2022

Meeting place
- Salempur, Sadhapur, Chhapra, Bihar - 841301

Website
- nagarseva.bihar.gov.in/chhapra

Chhapra Municipal Corporation or Chhapra Nagar Nigam, is the civic body that governs Chhapra, a city of Bihar in India.Municipal Corporation mechanism in India was introduced during British Rule with formation of municipal corporation in Madras (Chennai) in 1688, later followed by municipal corporations in Bombay (Mumbai) and Calcutta (Kolkata) by 1762. Chhapra Municipal Corporation consists of democratically elected members, is headed by a Mayor, and administers the city's infrastructure, public services, and supplies.

== Revenue ==
The following are the Income sources for the corporation from the Central and State Government

== Functions ==
Chhapra Municipal Corporation is created for the following functions:

- Planning for the town including its surroundings which are covered under its Department's Urban Planning Authority .
- Approving construction of new buildings and authorising use of land for various purposes.
- Improvement of the town's economic and Social status.
- Arrangements of water supply towards commercial, residential and industrial purposes.
- Planning for fire contingencies through Fire Service Departments.
- Creation of solid waste management, public health system and sanitary services.
- Working for the development of ecological aspect like development of Urban Forestry and making guidelines for environmental protection.
- Working for the development of weaker sections of the society like mentally and physically handicapped, old age and gender biased people.
- Making efforts for improvement of slums and poverty removal in the town.

=== Revenue from taxes ===
Following is the Tax related revenue for the corporation:

- Property tax
- Profession tax
- Entertainment tax
- Grants from Central and State Government like Goods and Services Tax
- Advertisement tax

=== Revenue from non-tax sources ===
Following is the Non Tax related revenue for the corporation:

- Water usage charges
- Fees from Documentation services
- Rent received from municipal property
- Funds from municipal bonds
