= List of mayors of Ayodhya =

Ayodhya Mayoral Constituency is one of the 16 mayoral constituencies of Uttar Pradesh, which was formed in year 2017.

== Total Number of Voters ==
Election	Polling Stations	Male Voters	Female Voters	Total Voters
2023	N/A	N/A	N/A	1,98,905

== List of Mayors ==
Key

BJP

Election	Mayor	Party
2017	Rishikesh Upadhyay	Bharatiya Janata Party
2023	Girish Pati Tripathi	Bharatiya Janata Party

== Election results ==
Uttar Pradesh Local Body Election, 2023: Ayodhya
Party	Candidate	Votes	%	±%
BJP	Girish Pati Tripathi	75,456	47.92	
SP	Rakesh Pandey	41,831	26.30	
	Girish Chandra	6,033	6.07	
INC	Shailendra Mani	3,601	3.62	
AAP	Sarvesh Kumar Verma	1,180	1.19	
none of the above	None of the Above	686	0.69	
Majority		3,601	3.62	
Turnout		99,447	50.00	
BJP hold		Swing		

Uttar Pradesh Local Body Election, 2017: Ayodhya
Party	Candidate	Votes	%	±%
BJP	Rishikesh Upadhyay	44,642	44.89	
SP	Gulshan Bindu	41,041	41.27	
BSP	Girish Chandra	6,033	6.07	
INC	Shailendra Mani	3,601	3.62	
AAP	Sarvesh Kumar Verma	1,180	1.19	
none of the above	None of the Above	686	0.69	
Majority		3,601	3.62	
Turnout		99,447	50.00	
BJP win (new seat)				
