= Malti Rai =

Indian politician

- मालती राय

Mayor of Bhopal
- Incumbent
- Assumed office 8 July 2022

Personal details
- Party: Bharatiya Janata Party
- Profession: Teacher, Politician

Malti Rai is an Indian politician who is mayor of Bhopal and president of the Bharatiya Janata Party of Bhopal, which nominated her for mayor. She is Bhopal's first female mayor. She was a city councillor from Ashoka Garden, Bhopal from 2004 to 2009.

== Personal life ==
She was born in Bina. In 1980 she married Munnalal Rai, a farmer.
