= 2021 Tripura municipal elections =

Indian state election

- 25 November 2021
- Turnout: 81.54%

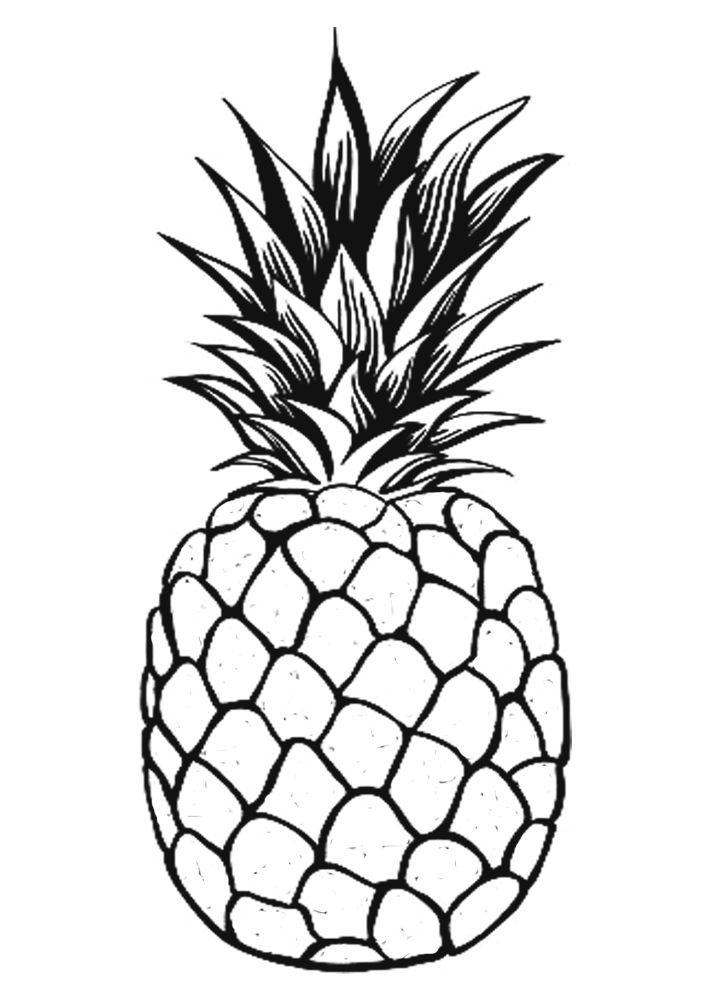
Party	BJP	CPI(M)	TMC
Alliance	NDA	Left Front
Percentage	59.01%	18.13%	16.68%
Seats Won	329	3	1
Party	TIPRA
Seats Won	1

Municipal elections were held in the Indian state of Tripura on 25 November 2021 to elect 222 of the 334 seats in one Municipal Corporation, 13 Municipal Councils and 6 Nagar Panchayats. The polls were hit with widespread violence and accusations of rigging. On polling day, the Supreme Court ordered the Ministry of Home Affairs to deploy two additional companies of Central paramilitary forces to ensure free and fair election in Tripura. A total of 785 candidates contested 222 seats and over 4.93 lakh electors were eligible to vote in this election.

== Contesting parties ==
Party	Symbol	Alliance
Bharatiya Janata Party (BJP)		NDA
Communist Party of India (Marxist) (CPI(M))		Left Front
Communist Party of India (CPI)		Left Front
Revolutionary Socialist Party (RSP)		Left Front
All India Forward Bloc (AIFB)		Left Front
Indian National Congress (INC)		None
Amra Bangali		None
All India Trinamool Congress (AITC)		None
Tripura Democratic Front		None
Tipra Motha Party		None
Independents (IND)		None

== Results ==
Votes were counted on 28 November 2021, following which the results were announced by Tripura State Election Commission.

=== By political parties ===
Alliance	Party	Popular vote		Seats			Position in civic bodies
Alliance	Party	Votes	%	Contested	Won	Earned second position	Position in civic bodies
National Democratic Alliance	Bharatiya Janata Party	2,38,962	59.01	334	329	5	Government in 20 local bodies
Left Front	Communist Party of India (Marxist)	73,402	19.99	192	3	158	Opposition in 2 local bodies, runner-up in 13 local bodies
Left Front	Communist Party of India	3,089	19.99	6	0	158	Opposition in 2 local bodies, runner-up in 13 local bodies
Left Front	All India Forward Bloc	1,305	19.99	5	0	158	Opposition in 2 local bodies, runner-up in 13 local bodies
Left Front	Revolutionary Socialist Party	1,790	19.99	2	0	158	Opposition in 2 local bodies, runner-up in 13 local bodies
None	Trinamool Congress	66,388	16.68	120	1	59	Runner-up in one local body
None	Tipra Motha Party			8	1	0	–
None	Indian National Congress	8,364	2.07	92	0	9	–
None of the Above		6,983	1.72	222			
Total		3,97,971	100	222			
Valid votes		3,97,971					

=== By local bodies ===
Local Body	Winning party (vote percentage)	Runner-up party (vote percentage)	Others (Vote percentage greater than 10% are given)	Ref(s)
Dharmanagar Municipal Council	BJP (67.98%)	Left Front (20.41%)	—	
Kailashahar Municipal Council	BJP (55.96%)	Left Front (28.81%)	—	
Kumarghat Municipal Council	BJP (61.77%)	Left Front (33.36%)	—	
Ambassa Municipal Council	BJP (45.02%)	AITC (27.45%)	Left Front (22.78%)	
Khowai Municipal Council	BJP (78.33%)	Left Front (18.98%)	—	
Teliamura Municipal Council	BJP (53.57%)	AITC (27.15%)	Left Front (17.37%)	
Melaghar Municipal Council	BJP (79.24%)	Left Front (14.55%)	—	
Bilonia Municipal Council	BJP (65.47%)	Left Front (27.25%)	—	
Panisagar Nagar Panchayat	BJP (65.31%)	Left Front (30.13%)	—	
Sonamura Nagar Panchayat	BJP (48.92%)	Left Front (26.33%)	AITC (19.30%)	
Amarpur Nagar Panchayat	BJP (68.11%)	Left Front (22.57%)	—	
Sabroom Nagar Panchayat	BJP (62.67%)	Left Front (32.77%)	—	
Agartala Municipal Corporation	BJP (57.39%)	AITC (20.14%)	Left Front (17.94%)	
