= 2026 Gujarat local elections =

Elections in Gujarat

- 26 April 2026

15 municipal corporations, 84 municipalities, 34 district panchayats, 260 taluka panchayats
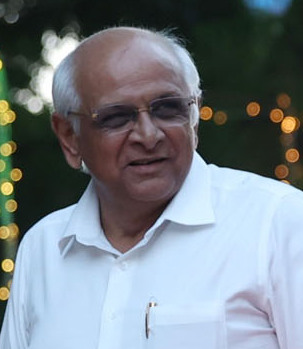

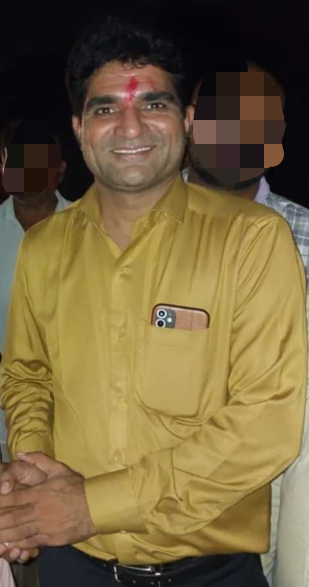
	Majority party	Minority party	Third party
Leader	Bhupendrabhai Patel	Amit Chavda	Isudan Gadhvi
Party	BJP	INC	AAP
Alliance	NDA	INDIA	-
Leader since	13 September 2021	17 July 2025	4 January 2023
Last election	485	57	28
Seats won	894	95	6
Seat change	▲409	▲38	▼22
Percentage	59.36%	26.46%	10.27%
Swing	▲6.28%	▼0.44%	▼3.01%

Local elections were held in the Indian state of Gujarat on 26 April 2026. Elections for the Gandhinagar Municipal Corporation were be held on 11 October. 9 municipal corporations were elected for the first time.

The governing Bharatiya Janata Party (BJP) saw a landslide victory, winning the majority of the 84 municipalities, 34 district panchayats, and 260 taluka panchayats. The BJP also won all 15 municipal corporations, in a show of strength ahead of the next 2027 Gujarat Legislative Assembly election. The opposition Indian National Congress made minor gains, while the Aam Aadmi Party suffered a setback from its gains in the previous elections. The All India Majlis-e-Ittehadul Muslimeen and Samajwadi Party also made their entry into Gujarat civic politics. Overall, of 9,900 elected seats, 730 went uncontested. The BJP won over 6,472 of the seats. Municipal corporations saw a voter turnout of 55.1%, municipalities 65.53%, district panchayats 66.64%, and taluka panchayats 67.26%.

The BJP also won 38 of the 44 wards in the election held in Gandhinagar Municipal Corporation in on 11 October.

== Results ==
=== Municipal Corporations ===
Corporation	Party won	Seats composition
Ahmedabad Municipal Corporation; Total seats (192)	Bharatiya Janata Party	BJP (160); INC (32)
Surat Municipal Corporation; Total seats (120)	Bharatiya Janata Party	BJP (115); AAP (4); INC (1)
Vadodara Municipal Corporation; Total seats (76)	Bharatiya Janata Party	BJP (69); INC (6); Others (1)
Rajkot Municipal Corporation; Total seats (72)	Bharatiya Janata Party	BJP (65); INC (7)
Jamnagar Municipal Corporation; Total seats (64)	Bharatiya Janata Party	BJP (60); INC (2); Others (2)
Bhavnagar Municipal Corporation; Total seats (52)	Bharatiya Janata Party	BJP (44); INC (8)
Anand Municipal Corporation; Total seats (52)	Bharatiya Janata Party	BJP (43); INC (8); Others (1)
Gandhidham Municipal Corporation; Total seats (52)	Bharatiya Janata Party	BJP (41); INC (11)
Mehsana Municipal Corporation; Total seats (52)	Bharatiya Janata Party	BJP (47); INC (5)
Morbi Municipal Corporation; Total seats (52)	Bharatiya Janata Party	BJP (52)
Nadiad Municipal Corporation; Total seats (52)	Bharatiya Janata Party	BJP (51); INC (1)
Navsari Municipal Corporation; Total seats (52)	Bharatiya Janata Party	BJP (50); INC (2)
Porbandar Chhaya Municipal Corporation; Total seats (52)	Bharatiya Janata Party	BJP (52)
Surendranagar Municipal Corporation; Total seats (52)	Bharatiya Janata Party	BJP (51); INC (1)
Vapi Municipal Corporation; Total seats (52)	Bharatiya Janata Party	BJP (37); INC (11); Others (4)
Gandhinagar Municipal Corporation; Total seats (44)	Bharatiya Janata Party	BJP (38); INC (5); Others (1)
