= Birgaon =

- city
- Location in Chhattisgarh, India Birgaon (India)
- Coordinates: 21.30116°N 81.62866°E
- Country: India
- State: Chhattisgarh
- District: Raipur

Population (2011)
  - Total: 96,294

Languages
  - Official: Hindi, Chhattisgarhi
- Time zone: UTC+5:30 (IST)
- Vehicle registration: CG

Birgaon is a municipal corporation and a part of Raipur urban agglomeration in Raipur district in the state of Chhattisgarh, India.

The town is known for its famous Banjari Mata Temple.

== Demographics ==
As of the 2001 India census, Birgaon had a population of 23,352. Males constitute 54% of the population and females 46%. Birgaon has an average literacy rate of 60%, higher than the national average of 59.5%; with male literacy of 70% and female literacy of 48%. 21% of the population is under 6 years of age.
