= Bilaspur Municipal Corporation =

Civic body that governs the city of Bilaspur in Chhattisgarh, India

Bilaspur Municipal Corporation बिलासपुर नगर निगम

Type
- Type: Municipal Corporation
- Term limits: 5 years

History
- Founded: 2009

Leadership
- Leader of House (Mayor): Pooja Vidhani, BJP since 15 February 2025
- Leader of the Opposition: Bharat Kashyap, INC since 16 April 2025

Structure
- Seats: 70
- Political groups: Government (45): BJP (49); Opposition (11): INC (18); Others (11): IND (3)
- Length of term: 5 years

Elections
- Voting system: First-past-the-post
- Last election: 11 February 2025
- Next election: 2030

Meeting place
- Bilaspur, Chhattisgarh

Website
- www.bmcbilaspur.com

Bilaspur Municipal Corporation is the civic body governing Indian city of Bilaspur, Chhattisgarh. Municipal Corporation mechanism in India was introduced during British Rule with formation of municipal corporation in Madras (Chennai) in 1688, later followed by municipal corporations in Bombay (Mumbai) and Calcutta (Kolkata) by 1762. Bilaspur Municipal Corporation is headed by Mayor of city and governed by Commissioner.

== History and administration ==
Bilaspur Municipal Corporation was formed in 2009 to improve the infrastructure of the town as per the needs of local population. Bilaspur Municipal Corporation has been expanded by Chhattisgarh Government to include additional Municipal Council, Nagar Panchayat, Gram Panchayat and Gram (village). Bilaspur Municipal Corporation has 70 wards and each ward is headed by councillor for which elections are held every 5 years.

== Functions ==
Berhampur Municipal Corporation is created for the following functions:

- Planning for the town including its surroundings which are covered under its Department's Urban Planning Authority .
- Approving construction of new buildings and authorising use of land for various purposes.
- Improvement of the town's economic and Social status.
- Arrangements of water supply towards commercial, residential and industrial purposes.
- Planning for fire contingencies through Fire Service Departments.
- Creation of solid waste management, public health system and sanitary services.
- Working for the development of ecological aspect like development of Urban Forestry and making guidelines for environmental protection.
- Working for the development of weaker sections of the society like mentally and physically handicapped, old age and gender biased people.
- Making efforts for improvement of slums and poverty removal in the town.

== Revenue sources ==
The following are the Income sources for the Corporation from the Central and State Government.

=== Revenue from taxes ===
Following is the Tax related revenue for the corporation.

- Property tax.
- Profession tax.
- Entertainment tax.
- Grants from Central and State Government like Goods and Services Tax.
- Advertisement tax.

=== Revenue from non-tax sources ===
Following is the Non Tax related revenue for the corporation.

- Water usage charges.
- Fees from Documentation services.
- Rent received from municipal property.
- Funds from municipal bonds.

== Election results ==
=== Ward-wise ===
==== 2025 ====
Bilaspur Municipal Corporation
Party	Won	+/−
Bharatiya Janata Party	49	▲19
Indian National Congress	18	▼17
Independents	3	▼2
Total	70	

==== 2019 ====
Bilaspur Municipal Corporation
Party	Won	+/−
Indian National Congress	35	
Bharatiya Janata Party	30	
Independents	5	
Total	70	

== See also ==
- List of Municipal Corporations in India.
