= Korba Municipal Corporation =

Civic body that governs the city of Korba in Chhattisgarh, India

Korba Municipal Corporation कोरबा नगर निगम

Type
- Type: Municipal Corporation
- Term limits: 5 years

History
- Founded: 2000

Leadership
- Leader of House (Mayor): Sanju Devi Rajput, BJP since 15 February 2025
- Chairman of House (Speaker): Nootan Singh thakur
- Leader of the Opposition: Kriparam Sahu, INC since 27 March 2025
- Municipal Commissioner: Ashutosh Pandey, IAS

Structure
- Seats: 67
- Political groups: Government (45): BJP (45); Opposition (11): INC (11); Others (11): IND (11)
- Length of term: 5 years

Elections
- Voting system: First-past-the-post
- Last election: 11 February 2025
- Next election: 2030

Meeting place
- Korba, Chhattisgarh

Website
- www.korbamunicipal.in/mck/Default.aspx

Korba Municipal Corporation (KMC) is the Municipal Corporation for the city of Chhattisgarh. The functions of KMC include the administration of the civic infrastructure and in the city of Korba, Chhattisgarh. Municipal Corporation mechanism in India was introduced during British Rule with formation of municipal corporation in Madras (Chennai) in 1688, later followed by municipal corporations in Bombay (Mumbai) and Calcutta (Kolkata) by 1762. The organization is known, in short, as KMC. This civic administrative body administers an area of 215.02 km^{2} (250.29 sq mi). KMC is by shri Ashutosh pandey Commissioner and Sanju Devi Rajput the Mayor.

== History and administration ==
Korba Municipal Corporation was formed in 2000 to improve the infrastructure of the town as per the needs of local population. Korba Municipal Corporation has been categorised into wards and each ward is headed by councillor for which elections are held every 5 years.

Korba Municipal Corporation is governed by mayor Sanju Devi Prasad and administered by Municipal Commissioner Kuldeep Sharma.

== Election results ==
=== Ward-wise ===
==== 2025 ====
Korba Municipal Corporation
Party	Won	+/−
Bharatiya Janata Party	45	▲15
Indian National Congress	11	▼24
Independents	11	Steady
Total	67	
