= Lucknow Municipal Corporation =

City governing body of Lucknow, India

Lucknow Municipal Corporation Lucknow Nagar Nigam

Type
- Type: Municipal Corporation
- Term limits: 5 years

History
- Founded: 1884; 142 years ago as Lucknow Municipal Board

Leadership
- Mayor: Sushma Kharakwal, BJP
- Municipal Commissioner: Gaurav Kumar, IAS

Structure
- Seats: 110
- Political groups: Government (80): BJP (80); Opposition (30): SP (21); INC (4); BSP (1); IND (4)
- Length of term: 5 years

Elections
- Last election: 4 May 2023
- Next election: May 2028

Motto
- Clean Lucknow, Beautiful Lucknow

Meeting place
- Municipal Corporation Head Office, Lalbagh, Lucknow, Uttar Pradesh

Website
- Municipal Corporation

The Lucknow Municipal Corporation (LMC), or the Lucknow Nagar Nigam is a local government for Lucknow, the capital and the largest city of the Indian state of Uttar Pradesh. It is responsible for the civic infrastructure and administration in the city of Lucknow.

In 2025, LMC passed a budget of 4,304 Crore INR for the financial year 2025–2026, a major jump from the last years budget of 2,865 Crore INR.

== Main functions ==
This local governing body is responsible for planning and development of several civic community and infrastructure within different parts of the city. The LMC is concerned with providing local amenities to the citizens.

- Maintenance & development of roads, subways, bridges, and flyovers
- Spreading green environment concept
- Developing the slums into better living zones for backward classes
- Construction of health units, schools, and food canteens
- Garbage disposal unit at every part of the city
- Providing sufficient water and electricity facility
- Free education with meal and clothes to poverty ridden children up to 12 years.

Apart from these social services, the LMC is concentrating on preserving the city heritage structure and buildings. The municipality is responsible for issuing of birth and death certificate to city residents. This policy helps in maintaining a record on the population growth rate.

The city development plan (CDP) is a project undertaken by LMC in association with JNNURM. The main purpose of this project is to offer a through city assessment. This is required for development of the Lucknow city in the near future. There is a 3-tier strategy to be implanted under this plan:

- Infrastructure & service delivery improvement
- Basic services to urban poor
- Institutional & governance reforms

The CDP formulation procedure was carried out after consulting the entire stakeholders associated with this project. One on one discussion session with every stakeholder was carried out.

Under the three-tier strategy, major issues to be focused and services offered include:

- Water Supply
- Sewerage and Sanitation
- Solid Waste Management
- Drainage
- Transportation

Another project undertaken by LMC is city GIS mapping. The municipality will conduct a detailed GIS mapping of the city. This will help in locating any area within the city through internet. It is also a part of JNNURM program. Funding for this project is being provided by Central Government.

== Developments ==
On 2 December 2020, LMC got listed on Bombay Stock Exchange (BSE), becoming the first civic body in north India to issue bonds under Atal Mission for Rejuvenation and Urban Transformation (AMRUT).

== Departments ==
There are 7 working departments which comes under LMC.

1. Health Department
2. Home Tax Department
3. Air Quality Management
4. Garden Department
5. Publicity Department
6. Accounts Department
7. Property Department

== Administration ==
- The LMC is headed by an IAS officer who serves as Municipal Commissioner and appointed by the Uttar Pradesh Government, having all the executive powers.
- The Mayor, usually from the majority party, serves as head of the house. Mayor is known as the first citizen of the city.

The current municipal commissioner is IAS Gaurav Kumar.

LMC Officials
Post	Incumbent	Since	Appointed/ Elected	References
Mayor	Sushma Kharakwal	26 May 2023	Elected in 2023 LMC elections.	
Municipal Commissioner	Gaurav Kumar (IAS)	24 April 2025	Appointed by Government of Uttar Pradesh	

== Legislature ==
LMC consists of 110 wards for which a quinquennial election is held to elect corporators, who are responsible for basic civic infrastructure and enforcing duty in their constituencies (wards).

Various political parties nominate their candidates and the people of respective wards cast their votes during elections to elect the corporator for their ward.

== Mayor ==
The mayor is elected from within the ranks of the council in a quinquennial election. The elections are conducted in all 110 wards in the city to elect corporators. The party that wins the maximum number of seats holds an internal voting to decide the mayor. Mayor is considered as the first citizen of the city.

Shushma Kharakwal is the current mayor of Lucknow since 26 May 2023. She was elected in the 2023 LMC elections after defeating her closest rival the SP candidate Vandana Mishra by a margin of 52,699 votes. She is the second female mayor of the city after her predecessor Sanyukta Bhatia.

== Current Corporators ==
Ward		Corporators	
No.	Name	Name	Party
1	Shraddhya Atal Bihari Vajpayee	Chandawati	Samajwadi Party
2	Sharda Nagar - II	Draupadi	Bharatiya Janata Party
3	Ibrahimpur - II	Muskan Bharti	Samajwadi Party
4	Ibrahimpur - I	Brij Mohan Sharma	Bharatiya Janata Party
5	Raja Bijli Pasi - II	Pinki	Bharatiya Janata Party
6	Raja Bijli Pasi - I	Rajni Yadav	Samajwadi Party
7	Lal Ji Tandon	Roshini	Bharatiya Janata Party
8	Ambedkar Nagar	Shubhash Chandra	Samajwadi Party
9	Kalyan Singh	Asha Rawat	Samajwadi Party
10	Sarojini Nagar - I	Geeta Devi	Bharatiya Janata Party
11	Shaheed Bhagar Singh - II	Ramu	Samajwadi Party
12	Kargapur Sarsava	Rajesh Kumar	Samajwadi Party
13	Shaheed Bhagar Singh - I	Yogyata Yadav	Bharatiya Janata Party
14	Bharwara Malhaur	Mamta Rawat	Samajwadi Party
15	Lal Bahadur Shastri - I	Surendra Kumar Valmiki	Independent
16	Faizullaganj - IV	Ramu	Bharatiya Janata Party
17	Vikramaditya - Mahatama Gandhi	Amit Chaudhary	Bahujan Samaj Party
18	Sarojini Nagar - II	Ram Naresh	Bharatiya Janata Party
19	Sharda Nagar - I	Himanshu Ambedkar	Bharatiya Janata Party
20	New Haiderganj - III	Vinod Kumar Yadav	Bharatiya Janata Party
21	Malviya Nagar	Mamta Chaudhary	Indian National Congress
22	Jankipuram - III	Dipak Kumar Lodhi	Bharatiya Janata Party
23	Gurunanak Nagar	Piyush Diwan	Bharatiya Janata Party
24	Saadatganj	Shiv Kumar Yadav	Bharatiya Janata Party
25	Babu Kunj Bihari - Omnagar	Sarita Mishra	Bharatiya Janata Party
26	Aishbagh	Sandeep Sharma	Bharatiya Janata Party
27	Balaganj	Kamlesh Kumari Diwedi	Bharatiya Janata Party
28	Rammohan Rai	Madhu Singh	Bharatiya Janata Party
29	Kharika - II	Rajni Awasthi	Bharatiya Janata Party
30	Kharika - I	Krishna Narayan Singh	Bharatiya Janata Party
31	Jankipuram - I	Nisha Tiwari	Bharatiya Janata Party
32	Alamnagar	Rekha Singh	Bharatiya Janata Party
33	Lalkuan	Shushil Kumar Tiwari	Bharatiya Janata Party
34	Hazratganj - Ramtirth	Nagendra Singh Chauhan	Bharatiya Janata Party
35	Hind Nagar	Saurabh Singh 'Monu'	Bharatiya Janata Party
36	Kesari Kheda	Devendra Singh Yadav	Samajwadi Party
37	Gomti Nagar	Kaushal Shankar Pandey	Indian National Congress
38	Kanhaiya - Madhavpur - II	Md. Shakir	Independent
39	New Haiderganj - II	Dharmendra Kumar Singh	Bharatiya Janata Party
40	Indira Priyadarshini	Kalpana Verma	Bharatiya Janata Party
41	Ram Ji Lal - Sardar Patel Nagar	Sandhya Mishra	Bharatiya Janata Party
42	Shankarpurva - II	Shivam Upadhya	Bharatiya Janata Party
43	Ismailganj - II	Ranjana Awasthi	Bharatiya Janata Party
44	Faizullaganj - II	Priyanka	Bharatiya Janata Party
45	Guru Govind Singh	Shravan Nayak	Bharatiya Janata Party
46	Kunwar Jyoti Prasad	Gauri Sanvariya	Bharatiya Janata Party
47	Daliganj - Niralanagar	Abhilasha Katiyar	Bharatiya Janata Party
48	Faizullaganj - I	Rashmi Singh	Bharatiya Janata Party
49	Mahakavi Jai Shankar Prasad	Swadesh Singh	Bharatiya Janata Party
50	Chinhat - I	Arun Kumar Rai	Bharatiya Janata Party
51	Ismailganj - I	Mukesh Singh Chauhan	Indian National Congress
52	Kanhaiya - Madhavpur - I	Ram Naresh Chaurasiya	Samajwadi Party
53	Mahanagar	Harishchandra Lodhi	Bharatiya Janata Party
54	Geetapalli	Richa Mishra	Bharatiya Janata Party
55	Rani Laxmi Bai	Shafikur Rehman	Samajwadi Party
56	Vidhya Vati	Kaushalendra Diwedi	Bharatiya Janata Party
57	Babu Banarsi Das	Ashish Kumar Hitaishi	Bharatiya Janata Party
58	Moti Lal Nehru - Chandra Bhanu Gupta Nagar	Charanjit Gandhi	Bharatiya Janata Party
59	Colvin College - Nishatganj	Pramod Singh	Bharatiya Janata Party
60	Vidhya Vati - III	Nirmala Singh	Bharatiya Janata Party
61	Tilak Nagar - Kundari Rakabganj	Rajiv Bajpayee	Bharatiya Janata Party
62	Rafi Ahmed Kidwai	Malti Yadav	Bharatiya Janata Party
63	Ayodhya Das - II	Awdhesh Tripathi	Bharatiya Janata Party
64	Vidhya Vati - I	Pratima Tiwari	Bharatiya Janata Party
65	Chitragupta Nagar	Narendra Kumar	Bharatiya Janata Party
66	Chinhat - II	Shailendra Verma	Bharatiya Janata Party
67	Lala Lajpat Rai	Raghav Ram Tiwari	Bharatiya Janata Party
68	Babu Jagjivan Ram	Bhrigunath Shukla	Bharatiya Janata Party
69	J.C. Bose	Yavar Hussain Reshu	Samajwadi Party
70	Paper Mill Colony	Rajesh Singh	Bharatiya Janata Party
71	Mankameshwar Mandir	Ranjit Singh	Bharatiya Janata Party
72	Shankarpurva - III	Umesh Chandra Sanval	Bharatiya Janata Party
73	Faizullaganj - III	Pradeep Kumar Shukla	Bharatiya Janata Party
73	Faizullaganj - III	Lalit Kishore Tiwari	Samajwadi Party
74	Jankipuram - II	Rajkumari Maurya	Bharatiya Janata Party
75	Bhartendu Harishchandra	Man Singh Yadav	Bharatiya Janata Party
76	Rajiv Gandhi - I	Sanjay Rathore	Bharatiya Janata Party
77	Maithlisharan Gupta	Ashok Kumar Upadhya	Independent
78	Labor Colony	Ajay Dixit	Bharatiya Janata Party
79	Rajajipuram	Kaumudi Tripathi	Bharatiya Janata Party
80	Indira Nagar	Puja Jaswani	Bharatiya Janata Party
81	Mallahi Tola - II	Gulshan Abbas	Samajwadi Party
82	Triveni Nagar	Dev Sharma Mishra	Bharatiya Janata Party
83	New Haiderganj - I	Rajnii Gupta	Bharatiya Janata Party
84	Kadam Rasool	Mohd. Nadeem	Samajwadi Party
85	Mallahi Tola - I	CB Singh	Bharatiya Janata Party
86	Lohia Nagar	Rajesh Mishra	Bharatiya Janata Party
87	Gola Ganj	Mohd. Haleem	Samajwadi Party
88	Bashiratganj - Ganeshganj	Girish Gupta	Bharatiya Janata Party
89	Sheetla Devi	Anoop Kamal Saxena	Bharatiya Janata Party
90	Rajendra Nagar	Rajesh Kumar Dixit	Bharatiya Janata Party
91	Vivekanand Puri	Nupur Shankghar	Bharatiya Janata Party
92	Shankarpurva - I	Namita Yadav	Samajwadi Party
93	Husainabad	Lubana Ali	Bharatiya Janata Party
94	Daulatganj	Rani Kanaujia	Bharatiya Janata Party
95	Maulvi Ganj	Mukesh Singh 'Monti'	Bharatiya Janata Party
96	Lal Bahadur Shashtri - II	Bhupendra Kumar Sharma	Bharatiya Janata Party
97	Gadhi Pir Khan	Shaista Parveen	Independent
98	Yadunath Sanyal - Nazarbagh	Kaamran Beg	Samajwadi Party
99	Acharya Narendra Dev	Manish Rastogi	Bharatiya Janata Party
100	Rajiv Gandhi - II	Arun Kumar Tiwari	Bharatiya Janata Party
101	Amberganj	Saba Ahsan Mansuri	Samajwadi Party
102	Maulana Kalbe Abid	Ifham Ullah	Indian National Congress
103	Mashakganj - Wazirganj	Mohd. Naeem	Samajwadi Party
104	Yahiaganj - Netaji Subhash Chandra Bose	Narendra Sharma	Bharatiya Janata Party
105	Kashmiri Mohalla	Laeek Aaga	Samajwadi Party
106	Chowk - Bazar Kali Ji	Anurag Mishra 'Annu'	Bharatiya Janata Party
107	Raja - Bazar	Rahul Mishra	Bharatiya Janata Party
108	Bhawaniganj	Reeta Rai	Bharatiya Janata Party
109	Aliganj	Prithvi Gupta	Bharatiya Janata Party
110	Ayodhya Das - I	Musbbor Ali Manshu	Samajwadi Party

== LMC elections ==
=== Mayor elections ===
==== 2023 ====
Lucknow Municipal Corporation Elections : 2023
Party	Candidate	Votes	%	±%
BJP	Sushma Kharakwal	5,02,660	48.52	
SP	Vandana Mishra	2,98,519	28.81	
INC	Sangeeta Jaiswal	1,02,633	9.91	
BSP	Shaheen Bano	75,997	7.34	
AAP	Anju Bhatt	25,206	2.43	
NOTA	None of the Above	24,241	2.34	
Margin of victory		2,04,141	19.71	▲5.11
Turnout		10,29,256		
BJP hold		Swing		

==== 2017 ====
Lucknow Municipal Corporation Elections : 2017
Party	Candidate	Votes	%	±%
BJP	Sanyukta Bhatia	3,77,166	41.94	
SP	Meera Vardhan	2,45,810	27.34	
INC	Prema Awasthi	1,09,571	12.19	
BSP	Bulbul Godiyal	83,120	9.24	
AAP	Priyanka Maheshwari	24,577	2.73	
NOTA	None of the Above	5,449	0.61	
Margin of victory		1,31,356	14.60	
Turnout		8,99,214	38.64	
BJP hold		Swing		

==== 2012 ====
Lucknow Municipal Corporation Elections : 2012
Party	Candidate	Votes	%	±%
BJP	Dr. Dinesh Sharma	3,35,106		
INC	Dr. Neeraj Bora	1,63,282		
Margin of victory		1,71,824		
Turnout		N/A		
BJP hold		Swing		

==== 2006 ====
Lucknow Municipal Corporation Elections : 2006
Party	Candidate	Votes	%	±%
BJP	Dr. Dinesh Sharma	2,21,713	30.33	
INC	Dr. Manzoor Ahmed	2,12,410	29.05	
SP	Dr. Madhu Gupta	1,58,918	21.74	
IND.	Shiv Kumar Gupta	34,155	4.67	
IND.	Shailesh Kumar Singh	25,631	3.51	
RLD	Bhawaan Singh Rawat	15,476	2.12	
IND.	Mahesh Diwan	11,169	1.53	
Margin of victory		9,303	1.28	
Turnout		7,31,097	N/A	
BJP hold		Swing		

=== Corporator elections ===
==== 2023 ====
S.No	Party name	Party flag or symbol	Number of Corporators	Change
01	Bharatiya Janata Party (BJP)		80	▲22
02	Samajwadi Party (SP)		21	▼7
03	Indian National Congress (INC)		4	▼4
04	Bahujan Samaj Party (BSP)		1	▼1
05	Independents		4	▼10

==== 2017 ====
S.No.	Party name	Party flag or symbol	Number of Corporators	Change
01	Bharatiya Janata Party (BJP)		58	▲14
02	Samajwadi Party (SP)		28	
03	Indian National Congress (INC)		8	▼3
04	Bahujan Samaj Party (BSP)		2	New
05	Independents		14	▼40

== See also ==
- Lucknow
- List of mayors of Lucknow
- List of municipal corporations in India
- 2023 Lucknow Municipal Corporation election
