= Sanyukta Bhatia =

Indian politician and 4th Mayor of Lucknow (2017-2023)

4th Mayor of Lucknow
- In office 12 December 2017 – 19 January 2023
- Preceded by: Suresh Awasthi
- Succeeded by: Sushma Kharakwal

Personal details
- Born: 19 October 1946 (age 79) Basti, United Provinces, British India
- Party: Bharatiya Janata Party
- Spouse: Late. Satish Bhatia (Ex.MLA)
- Education: Post Graduate

Sanyukta Bhatia (born 19 October 1946) is an Indian politician who was the first woman to be elected as the Mayor of Lucknow Municipal Corporation, which is one of the biggest municipal corporations in India.
