= List of urban local bodies in Gujarat =

The following is the list of urban local bodies in the state of Gujarat, India. In India, there are various types of urban local bodies such as Municipal Corporation, Municipality, Notified Area Committee, Town Area Committee, Special Purpose Agency, Township, Port Trust, Cantonment Board etc.

1. Municipal Corporations - 17
2. Municipalities - 149
3. Nagar Panchayat -16

== Urban local governance ==
Gujarat is the fifth most urbanized state in India, with 43.9% of its population living in urban areas as of the 2011 census, which is higher than the national average of 31.16%. The urban population in Gujarat has been growing rapidly and was estimated to be around 23 million in 2020. Gujarat has 247 Statutory Towns and 118 Census Towns, according to the 2011 census.

Gujarat has several rapidly growing urban centers, including Ahmedabad, Surat, Vadodara, Rajkot, and Gandhinagar. Ahmedabad, the largest city in the state, is a major industrial and commercial hub, and home to several prestigious educational institutions. Surat is known for its diamond industry and is a major center for textile manufacturing, while Vadodara is a hub for the petrochemical industry. Rajkot is known for its engineering and auto parts industries, while Gandhinagar, the state capital, is a planned city that houses the administrative headquarters of the state government.

=== Municipal acts ===
There are three municipal acts in effect in Gujarat:

Name of Act	Area of Effect
Gujarat Provincial Municipal Corporations Act, 1949	All Municipal Corporations in Gujarat
Gujarat Municipalities Act, 1963	All Municipalities in Gujarat
Gujarat Panchayats Act, 1993	All Gram Panchayats and Taluka Panchayats in Gujarat

Section 3 of Gujarat Provincial Municipal Corporations Act, and Section 3 of Gujarat Municipalities Act, 1963 created the following categories of urban areas based on their population.

Type	Population criterion	Type of Local Body
City	More than 1,00,000	Municipal Corporation
Municipality	20,000 or more, but less than 1,00,000	Municipality
Notified Area	Less than 20,000	Notified Area Committee

Furthermore, depending on the population size, the Acts prescribe the minimum and maximum number of councillors/wards allowed within each type of local government.

Minimum and maximum numbers of councillors allowed in municipalities in Gujarat
Population	Minimum	Maximum
Municipal Corporations
Above 40 lakhs		
Above 20 lakhs but not more than 40 lakhs		
Above 10 lakhs but not more than 20 lakhs		
Above 5 lakhs but not more than 10 lakhs		
Above 3 lakhs but not more than 5 lakhs		
Above 2 lakhs but not more than 3 lakhs		
Above 1 lakh but not more than 2 lakhs		
Above 50,000 but not more than 1 lakh		
Above 25,000 but not more than 50,000		
Municipalities
50,000 or more		
25,000 or more but less than 50,000		
Less than 25,000		

== Municipal Corporations ==
Organizational structure of the AMC

- State Government
  - Municipal Corporation
    - Commishiner
      - D.Y.N.C.s
      - Asst. M.C.
      - other Officers
    - Mayor
      - Secretary
      - Chief Auditor
      - Transport Officer
      - V.S. Hospital Boards
        - Superindendant V.S. Hospital
      - School Board Committee
        - M.J. Library Board
          - Grandhpal

There are 17 Corporations in Gujarat. During the Budget session of 2024-25 the State's Finance Minister announced 9 new Municipal Corporations in the state. The status of Municipal Corporation has been granted by the Government of Gujarat from 1 January 2025.

Sr. no.	Corporation Name	City	District	Area (km^{2})	Population (2011)	Year of establishment	No. of wards	No. of seats	Last Election	Ruling Party	Mayor	Website
1	Ahmedabad Municipal Corporation	Ahmedabad	Ahmedabad	505	82,53,084	1950	48	192	2026	BJP	Pratibhaben Rakeshkumar Jain	
2	Karamsad Anand Municipal Corporation	Anand	Anand	85.67	4,18,840	2025	13	52	2026	BJP		
3	Bhavnagar Municipal Corporation	Bhavnagar	Bhavnagar	108.27	7,71,365	1962	13	52	2026	BJP	Kirtiben Dhanidhariya	
4	Gandhidham Municipal Corporation	Gandhidham	Kutch	63.49	3,23,000	2025	13	52	2026	BJP		
5	Gandhinagar Municipal Corporation	Gandhinagar	Gandhinagar	326	4,10,618	2010	11	44	2021	BJP	Hitesh Makwana	
6	Jamnagar Municipal Corporation	Jamnagar	Jamnagar	125.67	6,82,302	1981	16	64	2026	BJP	Vinodbhai Khimsuriya	
7	Junagadh Municipal Corporation	Junagadh	Junagadh	160	4,15,838	2002	15	60	2025	BJP	Dharmesh Poshiya	
8	Mehsana Municipal Corporation	Mehsana	Mehsana	120	4,05,000	2025	13	52	2026	BJP	Sonal Oza	
9	Morbi Municipal Corporation	Morbi	Morbi	46.58	3,27,000	2025	13	52	2026	BJP		
10	Nadiad Municipal Corporation	Nadiad	Kheda	78.55	4,08,000	2025	13	52	2026	BJP	Manish Patel	
11	Navsari Municipal Corporation	Navsari	Navsari	43.71	3,67,002	2025	11	44	2026	BJP		
12	Porbandar–Chhaya Municipal Corporation	Porbandar–Chhaya	Porbandar	38.43	2,82,000	2025	13	52	2026	BJP		
13	Rajkot Municipal Corporation	Rajkot	Rajkot	163.21	19,34,975	1973	18	72	2026	BJP	Anand Patel	
14	Surat Municipal Corporation	Surat	Surat	462.14	74,90,598	1966	30	120	2026	BJP	Daxesh Kishorbhai Mavani	
15	Surendranagar Municipal Corporation	Surendranagar	Surendranagar	58.60	3,29,005	2025	11	44	2026	BJP		
16	Vadodara Municipal Corporation	Vadodara	Vadodara	220.33	16,70,806	1950	19	76	2026	BJP	Pinkyben Nirajbhai Soni	
17	Vapi Municipal Corporation	Vapi	Valsad	72	4,50,000	2025	11	44	2026	BJP		

== Municipalities ==
District	#	Municipality Name	Class	Zone
Ahmedabad	1	Dholka	B	Ahmedabad
Ahmedabad	2	Viramgam	B	Ahmedabad
Ahmedabad	3	Bavla	C	Ahmedabad
Ahmedabad	4	Dhandhuka	C	Ahmedabad
Ahmedabad	5	Sanand	C	Ahmedabad
Ahmedabad	6	Bareja	D	Ahmedabad
Botad	7	Botad	A	Ahmedabad
Botad	8	Gadhada	C	Ahmedabad
Botad	9	Barwala	D	Ahmedabad
Kheda	10	Kapadvanj	C	Ahmedabad
Kheda	11	Kheda	C	Ahmedabad
Kheda	12	Mehmedabad	C	Ahmedabad
Kheda	13	Chaklasi	C	Ahmedabad
Kheda	14	Dakor	C	Ahmedabad
Kheda	15	Kathlal	D	Ahmedabad
Kheda	16	Mahudha	D	Ahmedabad
Kheda	17	Thasra	D	Ahmedabad
Kheda	18	Kanjari	D	Ahmedabad
Surendranagar	19	Dhrangadhara	B	Ahmedabad
Surendranagar	20	Limbdi	C	Ahmedabad
Surendranagar	21	Thangadh	C	Ahmedabad
Surendranagar	22	Chotila	D	Ahmedabad
Surendranagar	23	Patadi	D	Ahmedabad
Bhavnagar	24	Mahuva	B	Bhavnagar
Bhavnagar	25	Palitana	B	Bhavnagar
Bhavnagar	26	Shihor	B	Bhavnagar
Bhavnagar	27	Gariadhar	C	Bhavnagar
Bhavnagar	28	Talaja	C	Bhavnagar
Bhavnagar	29	Vallabhipur	D	Bhavnagar
Amreli	30	Amreli	A	Bhavnagar
Amreli	31	Savarkundla	B	Bhavnagar
Amreli	32	Babra	C	Bhavnagar
Amreli	33	Bagasara	C	Bhavnagar
Amreli	34	Jafrabad	C	Bhavnagar
Amreli	35	Rajula	C	Bhavnagar
Amreli	36	Lathi	D	Bhavnagar
Amreli	37	Chalala	D	Bhavnagar
Amreli	38	Damnagar	D	Bhavnagar
Gir Somnath	39	Veraval	A	Bhavnagar
Gir Somnath	40	Una	B	Bhavnagar
Gir Somnath	41	Kodinar	C	Bhavnagar
Gir Somnath	42	Sutrapada	C	Bhavnagar
Gir Somnath	43	Talala	D	Bhavnagar
Junagadh	44	Keshod	B	Bhavnagar
Junagadh	45	Mangrol	B	Bhavnagar
Junagadh	46	Manavadar	C	Bhavnagar
Junagadh	47	Vanthali	D	Bhavnagar
Junagadh	48	Visavadar	D	Bhavnagar
Junagadh	49	Bantwa	D	Bhavnagar
Junagadh	50	Chorwad	D	Bhavnagar
Gandhinagar	51	Kalol	A	Gandhinagar
Gandhinagar	52	Dahegam	C	Gandhinagar
Gandhinagar	53	Mansa	C	Gandhinagar
Aravalli	54	Modasa	A	Gandhinagar
Aravalli	55	Bayad	D	Gandhinagar
Banaskantha	56	Palanpur	A	Gandhinagar
Banaskantha	57	Deesa	A	Gandhinagar
Mehsana	58	Kadi	A	Gandhinagar
Mehsana	59	Unjha	A	Gandhinagar
Mehsana	60	Vadnagar	A	Gandhinagar
Mehsana	61	Visnagar	A	Gandhinagar
Mehsana	62	Vijapur	C	Gandhinagar
Mehsana	63	Kheralu	D	Gandhinagar
Mehsana	64	Becharaji	D	Gandhinagar
Patan	65	Patan	A	Gandhinagar
Patan	66	Siddhpur	B	Gandhinagar
Patan	67	Radhanpur	C	Gandhinagar
Patan	68	Chanasma	D	Gandhinagar
Patan	69	Harij	D	Gandhinagar
Sabarkantha	70	Himmatnagar	A	Gandhinagar
Sabarkantha	71	Idar	C	Gandhinagar
Sabarkantha	72	Khedbrahma	C	Gandhinagar
Sabarkantha	73	Prantij	D	Gandhinagar
Sabarkantha	74	Talod	D	Gandhinagar
Sabarkantha	75	Vadali	D	Gandhinagar
Vav-Tharad	76	Tharad	C	Gandhinagar
Vav-Tharad	77	Dhanera	C	Gandhinagar
Vav-Tharad	78	Bhabhar	D	Gandhinagar
Vav-Tharad	79	Thara	D	Gandhinagar
Rajkot	80	Gondal	A	Rajkot
Rajkot	81	Jetpur	A	Rajkot
Rajkot	82	Dhoraji	B	Rajkot
Rajkot	83	Upleta	B	Rajkot
Rajkot	84	Jasdan	C	Rajkot
Rajkot	85	Bhayavadar	D	Rajkot
Devbhoomi Dwarka	86	Okha	B	Rajkot
Devbhoomi Dwarka	87	Khambhaliya	C	Rajkot
Devbhoomi Dwarka	88	Dwarka	C	Rajkot
Devbhoomi Dwarka	89	Salaya	C	Rajkot
Devbhoomi Dwarka	90	Bhanvad	D	Rajkot
Devbhoomi Dwarka	91	Jamraval	D	Rajkot
Jamnagar	92	Dhrol	C	Rajkot
Jamnagar	93	Jamjodhpur	C	Rajkot
Jamnagar	94	Kalavad	C	Rajkot
Jamnagar	95	Sikka	C	Rajkot
Kachchh	96	Bhuj	A	Rajkot
Kachchh	97	Anjar	B	Rajkot
Kachchh	98	Mandvi	B	Rajkot
Kachchh	99	Bhachau	C	Rajkot
Kachchh	100	Nakhatrana	C	Rajkot
Kachchh	101	Rapar	C	Rajkot
Kachchh	102	Mundra-Baroi	D	Rajkot
Morbi	103	Halvad	C	Rajkot
Morbi	104	Wankaner	C	Rajkot
Morbi	105	Maliya-Miyana	D	Rajkot
Morbi	106	Tankara	D	Rajkot
Porbandar	107	Ranavav	C	Rajkot
Porbandar	108	Kutiyana	D	Rajkot
Surat	109	Bardoli	B	Surat
Surat	110	Kadodara	C	Surat
Surat	111	Tarsadi	C	Surat
Surat	112	Mandvi	D	Surat
Bharuch	113	Bharuch	A	Surat
Bharuch	114	Ankleswar	B	Surat
Bharuch	115	Jambusar	C	Surat
Bharuch	116	Amod	D	Surat
Narmada	117	Rajpipla	A	Surat
Navsari	118	Bilimora	B	Surat
Navsari	119	Gandevi	D	Surat
Tapi	120	Vyara	C	Surat
Tapi	121	Songadh	C	Surat
Valsad	122	Valsad	A	Surat
Valsad	123	Pardi	C	Surat
Valsad	124	Umargam	C	Surat
Valsad	125	Dharampur	D	Surat
Vadodara	126	Dabhoi	B	Vadodara
Vadodara	127	Karjan	C	Vadodara
Vadodara	128	Padra	C	Vadodara
Vadodara	129	Savli	D	Vadodara
Vadodara	130	Waghodiya	D	Vadodara
Anand	131	Borsad	B	Vadodara
Anand	132	Khambhat	B	Vadodara
Anand	133	Petlad	B	Vadodara
Anand	134	Umreth	C	Vadodara
Anand	135	Karamsad	C	Vadodara
Anand	136	Anklav	D	Vadodara
Anand	137	Sojitra	D	Vadodara
Anand	138	Boriavi	D	Vadodara
Anand	139	Oad	D	Vadodara
Anand	140	Vallabh Vidyanagar	D	Vadodara
Chhota Udaipur	141	Chhota Udaipur	A	Vadodara
Dahod	142	Dahod	A	Vadodara
Dahod	143	Jhalod	C	Vadodara
Dahod	144	Devgadh Baria	D	Vadodara
Mahisagar	145	Lunawada	C	Vadodara
Mahisagar	146	Balasinor	C	Vadodara
Mahisagar	147	Santrampur	D	Vadodara
Panchmahal	148	Godhra	A	Vadodara
Panchmahal	149	Halol	B	Vadodara
Panchmahal	150	Kalol	C	Vadodara
Panchmahal	151	Shehera	D	Vadodara

== District wise overview ==
District	Municipal Corporation	Municipality			
District	Municipal Corporation	A	B	C	D
Ahmedabad	Ahmedabad	-	Dholka, Viramgam	Bavla, Dhandhuka, Sanand	Bareja
Amreli	-	Amreli	Savarkundla	Babra, Bagasara, Jafrabad, Rajula	Damnagar, Chalala, Lathi
Anand	Anand	-	Borsad, Khambhat, Petlad	Karamsad, Umreth	Anklav, Boriavi, Ode, Sojitra, Vallabh Vidyanagar
Aravalli	-	Modasa	-	-	Bayad
Banaskantha	-	Palanpur, Deesa	-	-	-
Bharuch	-	Bharuch	Ankleshwar	Jambusar	Amod
Bhavnagar	Bhavnagar	-	Mahuva, Palitana, Shihor	Gariadhar, Talaja	Vallabhipur
Botad	-	Botad	-	Gadhda	Barwala
Chhota Udaipur	-	Chhota Udaipur	-	-	-
Dahod	-	Dahod	-	Jhalod	Devgadh Baria
Dang	-	-	-	-	-
Devbhoomi Dwarka	-	-	Okha	Dwarka, Khambhaliya, Salaya	Bhanvad, Jam Raval
Gandhinagar	Gandhinagar	Kalol	-	Dahegam, Mansa	-
Gir Somnath	-	Veraval	Una	Kodinar, Sutrapada	Talala
Jamnagar	Jamnagar	-	-	Dhrol, Jamjodhpur, Kalavad, Sikka	-
Junagarh	Junagadh	-	Keshod, Mangrol	Manavadar	Bantwa, Chorvad, Vanthali, Visavadar
Kutch	Gandhidham	Bhuj	Anjar, Mandvi	Bhachau, Nakhatrana, Rapar	Mundra-Baroi
Kheda	Nadiad	-	-	Chaklasi, Dakor, Kapadvanj, Kheda, Mehmedabad	Kanjari, Kathlal, Mahuda, Thasra
Mahisagar	-	-	-	Balasinor, Lunawada	Santrampur
Mehsana	Mehsana	Kadi, Unjha, Vadnagar, Visnagar	-	Vijapur	Kheralu, Becharaji
Morbi	Morbi	-	-	Halvad, Wankaner	Maliya-Miyana, Tankara
Narmada	-	Rajpipla	-	-	-
Navsari	Navsari	-	Bilimora	-	Gandevi
Panchmahal	-	Godhra	Halol	Kalol	Shehera
Patan	-	Patan	Siddhpur	Radhanpur	Chanasma, Harij
Porbandar	Porbandar	-	-	Ranavav	Kutiyana
Rajkot	Rajkot	Jetpur, Gondal	Dhoraji, Upleta	Jasdan	Bhayavadar
Sabarkantha	-	Himatnagar	-	Idar, Khedbrahma	Prantij, Talod, Vadali
Surat	Surat	-	Bardoli	Kadodara, Tarsadi	Mandvi
Surendranagar	Surendranagar	-	Dhrangadhara	Limbdi, Thangadh	Chotila, Patadi
Tapi	-	-	-	Vyara, Songadh	-
Vadodara	Vadodara	-	Dabhoi	Karjan, Padra	Savli, Waghodiya
Valsad	Vapi	Valsad	-	Pardi, Umargam	Dharampur
Vav-Tharad	-	-	-	Tharad, Dhanera	Bhabhar, Thara

== See also ==
- 2021 Gujarat local elections
- List of urban local bodies in Uttar Pradesh
