= Rajkot Municipal Corporation =

Administrative body of Rajkot, Gujarat, India

- Emblem of the Rajkot Municipal Corporation

Type
- Type: Municipal corporation

History
- Founded: 1973; 53 years ago

Leadership
- Mayor: TBA
- Deputy Mayor: TBA
- Municipal commissioner: Tushar D. Sumera (IAS)

Structure
- Seats: 72
- Political groups: Government (65): BJP (65); Opposition (7): INC (7)
- Length of term: 5 years

Elections
- Voting system: First past the post
- Last election: 26 April 2026
- Next election: February 2031

Meeting place
- Rajkot, Gujarat

Website
- www.rmc.gov.in

Rajkot Municipal Corporation (RMC) is responsible for the civic infrastructure and administration of the city of Rajkot in Gujarat state of India. Established on 19 November 1973, this civic administrative body administers an area of 104.86 km^{2}. RMC is headed by the Mayor of Rajkot.

The governing structure of RMC consists of political and administrative wings. The political wing is an elected body of councilors headed by a mayor. The municipal commissioner from the IAS cadre heads the administrative wing and is responsible for strategic and operational planning and management of the corporation. The commissioner takes decisions on behalf of the board or the standing committee formed from the elected councilors to perform the duties of the corporation.

== Services ==
The RMC is responsible for administering and providing basic infrastructure to the city.

- City bus service - BRTS & RMTS
- Water Purification and Supply
- Sewage treatment and Disposal
- Garbage disposal and Street Cleanliness
- Solid Waste Management
- Disaster Management
- Building and Maintenance of Roads, Streets and Flyovers.
- Street Lighting
- Maintenance of Parks, Gardens and Open Plots (Spaces)
- Cemeteries and Crematoriums
- Registering of Births and Deaths
- Conservation of Heritage Sites
- Disease control, including Immunization
- Maintaining (Public) Municipal managed schools.

=== City Civic Center ===
Rajkot Municipal Corporation has started City Civic Center in different areas of city to get maximum advantage of the technology and give transparency in the day-to-day administration. RMC has five City Civic Centers, operational in different areas of Rajkot Municipal Corporation for benefits of citizens of Rajkot. Now any citizen can access municipal corporation's services within 3 km from his/her residence. All city civic centers are connected with one other by online networking facility. City civic center provides facilities like: Property Tax Assessment and Collection, Water Charges Assessment and Collection, New water connection, Complaint Redressal, Shop and Establishment, Birth's and Death's certificates, Building plans' permissions and various tax collection.

- Amin Marg City Civic Center
- Krishna Nagar City Civic Center
- East Zone City Civic Center
- Central Office City Civic Center
- West Zone City Civic Center
- Kothariya Road City Civic Center

Administrative purposes the city is divided into 3 zones - Central, East and West. The city is further divided in 18 wards.

The corporation is headed by a Municipal Commissioner, an IAS officer appointed by the government of Gujarat. He wields the executive power of the house. Each ward is represented by 4 corporators. An election is held to elect corporators to power. The mayor heads the party with the largest number of corporators elected. The mayor is responsible for the day-to-day running of the city services.

== Initiatives ==
=== Environment Safety Initiative ===
- In 2018, RMC banned plastic pouches in Rajkot in order to save the environment.

=== Rajkot Marathon 2017 ===
Rajkot Municipal Corporation had organized Marathon on 5 February 2017 (Sunday). There were six different routes offered to the runners:

- Full Marathon (42.195 km)
- Half Marathon (21.097 km)
- Dream Run (10.00 km)
- Rangeela Rajkot Run (5.00 km)
- Senior Citizen Run (2.50 km)
- Special Run - For disabled people (1.00 km)

Cheteshwar Pujara, Indian Cricketer was the brand ambassador of that marathon. The objective of the marathon was to spread awareness about smart city under the slogan of "Run for Smart Rajkot"
There were 63595 runners participated in various offered marathon routes. It became the second largest marathon of the world and the largest marathon of Asia with such huge participation.

== Reception ==
=== Awards and recognition ===
- In 2015, Quality Council of India, New Delhi felicitated Rajkot Municipal Corporation with Effective Management of Malnutrition in Slum Children Award
- In 2015, Nation Accreditation Board For Hospitals & Healthcare Providers (Constituent Board of Quality Council of India.) felicitated Rajkot Municipal Corporation with Nabh Accreditation Award (Nabh Accreditation To Nana Mawa Health Center 1st Urban Health Center of India To Get Such Accreditation.)
- In 2015, Government Of Gujarat felicitated Rajkot Municipal Corporation with 'Kayakalp Award' For Best Practice In Healthcare Felicitated By Hon. Chief Minister Shri Anandiben Patel
- In 2016, Quality Council of India, New Delhi felicitated Rajkot Municipal Corporation with National Award For Implementation of Food Safety Act-2016

=== Guinness World Records ===
- In 2017, Rajkot Municipal Corporation has become the Guinness World Record holder for "Largest House Cleaning Lesson" in which there were 1890 people from the various areas of Rajkot participated in performed the same as demonstrated by the trainer. This lesson lasted for more than 50 minutes. The participants were taught and trained about cleaning kitchen, bedroom, bathroom, living room and floor along with tips for segregation of waste at source. Further, every participant was gifted the kit containing two dustbins, a mop, a broom and a duster. This record attempt was made on 28 May 2017 at Rajkot. Official Link of Guinness World Records page.

== See also ==
- Amdavad Municipal Corporation
- Bhavnagar Municipal Corporation
- Gandhinagar Municipal Corporation
- Jamnagar Municipal Corporation
- Junagadh Municipal Corporation
- Surat Municipal Corporation
- Vadodara Municipal Corporation
- Veraval Municipal Council
