= 2021 Gujarat local elections =

Elections in Gujarat

- 2021

Total Seats:576
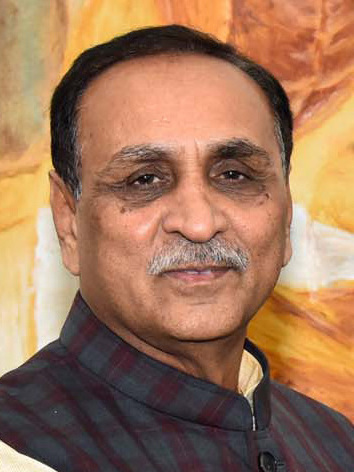

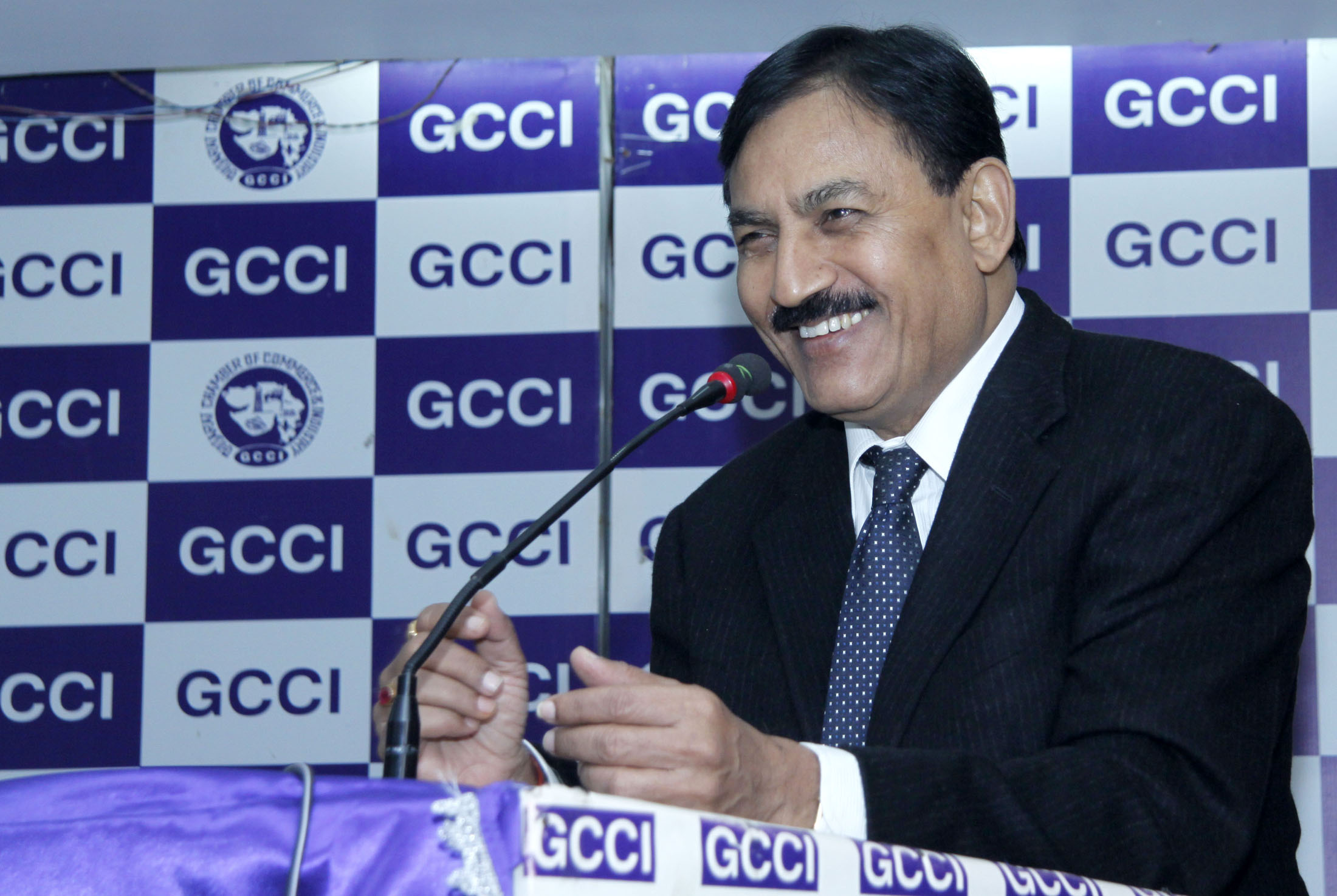
	Majority party	Minority party	Third party
			AAP
Leader	Vijay Rupani	Bharatsinh Madhavsinh Solanki	Gopal Italia
Party	BJP	INC	AAP
Alliance	NDA	UPA	-
Leader since	2016	2015	2012
Last election	405	192	-
Seats won	485	57	28
Seat change	▲80	▼135	▲28
Percentage	53.08%	26.9%	13.28%
Swing	▲3.95%	▼14.45%	▲13.28%

Local elections were held in the Indian state of Gujarat in 2021. Elections were held for 8,235 seats, with 237 seats having only one unopposed candidates. No form was filled for two seats in Taluka panchayat. The elections included six municipal corporations where elections took place in February — Ahmedabad, Surat, Vadodara, Rajkot, Bhavnagar and Jamnagar – and one (Gandhinagar) in which the elections were held on 3 October. Results to Gandhinagar Municipal Corporation were declared on 5 October 2021.

Before the elections, the Bharatiya Janata Party (BJP) ruled all the municipal corporations in the state.

== Background ==
In previous elections, the BJP won 389 seats and Indian National Congress (INC) won 176 seats. In 2017 BJP won the state assembly elections and was able to win all Lok Sabha seats in 2019.

In 2021, Aam Aadmi Party (AAP) and All India Majlis-e-Ittehadul Muslimeen (AIMIM) had also decided to contest elections to civic bodies. This is the first election in state since COVID-19 pandemic began. Candidates in 6 corporations include 577 from the BJP, 566 by Congress, and 470 by AAP. Election to Gandhinagar Municipal Corporation were held in October 2021 to 44 seats across 11 wards. Results were declared on 5 October 2021.

For Gandhinagar elections BJP and Congress have given 44 candidates each and AAP has given 40 candidates. The elections to Gujarat local bodies were held in view of strict COVID-19 guidelines

== Voters ==
Gender	Voters
Female	60.60 lakh
Males	54.06 lakh
Total	1.14 crore

The six municipal corporations reported an average 46.1% voting.

== Results ==
S.No.	Month of Poll	Municipal Bodies	Winning Party
1.	February 2021	Amdavad Municipal Corporation	Bharatiya Janata Party
2.	February 2021	Surat Municipal Corporation	Bharatiya Janata Party
3.	February 2021	Vadodara Municipal Corporation	Bharatiya Janata Party
4.	February 2021	Rajkot Municipal Corporation	Bharatiya Janata Party
5.	February 2021	Jamnagar Municipal Corporation	Bharatiya Janata Party
6.	February 2021	Bhavnagar Municipal Corporation	Bharatiya Janata Party
7.	October 2021	Gandhinagar Municipal Corporation	Bharatiya Janata Party

Party	Corporations won	Municipalities	District Panchayat	Taluka Panchayat
BJP	7	74	31	196
Indian National Congress	0	1	0	18
Aam Aadmi Party	0	0	0	0
Others	0	0	0	0

=== Votes percentage (party wise) ===
Corporation	BJP	Congress	AAP	Others
Surat Municipal Corporation	48.93%	18.6%	28.47%	4%
Ahmedabad Municipal Corporation	54.57%	29.26%	6.99%	9.18%
Vadodara Municipal Corporation	57.1%	34.98%	2.81%	5.11%
Bhavnagar Municipal Corporation	52.72%	32.97%	6.99%	7.32%
Jamnagar Municipal Corporation	50.68%	32.97%	8.41%	7.94%
Rajkot Municipal Corporation	53.7%	24.81%	17.4%	4.09%
Gandhinagar Municipal Corporation	46.49%	28.02%	21.77%	3.72%

=== By municipal corporation ===
BJP won all the 6 Municipal Corporation. Congress, the biggest opposition party, had won 55 seats. AAP became biggest opposition in Surat Municipal Corporation. AAP won seats in Surat and Gandhinagar Municipal elections.

BJP gained 94 seats while Congress lost 121 seats this time.

AIMIM also contested local body polls and won seven seats in Ahmedabad's Muslim-dominated Jamalpur and Maktampura wards. Bahujan Samaj Party (BSP) won 3 seats in Jamnagar Municipal Corporation. In 6 municipalities and 15 taluka panchayats, no party holds clear majority. In October 2021 results for Gandhinagar Municipal elections were declared. BJP won the election to Gandhinagar Corporation too with 40 seats. In all the 7 bodies BJP won with majority.

==== Amdavad Municipal Corporation ====
Party	Seats
Bharatiya Janata Party	159
Indian National Congress	25
All India Majlis-e-Ittehadul Muslimeen	7
Others	1
Total	192
Source: Times of India

==== Surat Municipal Corporation ====
Party	Seats
Bharatiya Janata Party	93
Aam Aadmi Party	27
Indian National Congress	0
Others	0
Total	120
Source: India Today

==== Vadodara Municipal Corporation ====
Party	Seats
Bharatiya Janata Party	69
Indian National Congress	7
Others	0
Total	76
Source: India Today

==== Bhavnagar Municipal Corporation ====
Party	Seats
Bharatiya Janata Party	44
Indian National Congress	8
Others	0
Total	52
Source: India Today

==== Jamnagar Municipal Corporation ====
Party	Seats
Bharatiya Janata Party	50
Indian National Congress	11
Bahujan Samaj Party	3
Others	0
Total	64
Source: India Today

==== Rajkot Municipal Corporation ====
Party	Seats
Bharatiya Janata Party	68
Indian National Congress	4
Others	0
Total	72
Source: India Today

==== Gandhinagar Municipal Corporation ====
Party	Seats
Bharatiya Janata Party	41
Indian National Congress	2
Aam Aadmi Party	1
Others	0
Total	44
Source: India Today

== Reactions ==
Prime Minister Modi congratulated the party's workers. CM Vijay Rupani expressed his gratitude towards Gujarati people. Delhi Chief Minister Arvind Kejriwal did a road show in Surat for party's representation as main opposition. Home Minister Amit Shah expressed his gratitude towards Gujarati people and party workers.
