= Bhatha =

- Neighbourhood
- Location in Gujarat, India
- Coordinates: 21°11′N 72°46′E
- Country: India
- State: Gujarat
- District: Surat

Government
  - Body: ગ્રામ પંચાયત Gram Panchayat

Languages
  - Official: Gujarati, Hindi
- Time zone: UTC+5:30 (IST)
- PIN: 394510
- Telephone code: 91261-XXX-XXXX
- Vehicle registration: GJ-5
- Lok Sabha constituency: Surat
- Civic agency: Surat Municipal Corporation

Bhatha is a village located in the outskirts of Surat. Pal is the most closest place to Bhatha which has recorded highest development since 2010. The village is divided into several streets and has well constructed kaccha house and pakka house.

== Location ==
Bhatha is 3 km from Pal RTO towards Hazira. People coming from Surat Railway station can reach Bhatha via Adajan Patia or Gujarat Gas circle by rickshaw or bus. The village is on the bank of the river Tapi.

== Culture and occupation of Bhatha ==
The main occupation of people of Bhatha is agriculture. Almost every house in Bhatha has some land to their property. People grow different kinds of vegetables in their farms. People own good agricultural tools and vehicles. There are other occupants residing in Bhatha including milkmen. There is a large community of people who possess good dairy cattle and contribute good quality milk to Choryasi dairy. People start their dayin the early morning around 4 AM. Milkmen with their cattle milk go to the dairy where a good amount of milk is collected, which is then transported to Choryasi dairies.

Bhatha is also very famous for a dry snack called "Kani ". This is a dry snack made out of gram flour. People from different parts of the Surat city visits Bhatha for buying "Kani" packets. Another two things Bhatha is very famous for are Indian Plum - "Bor" in Gujarati and doub Palm - "galeli" in Gujarati. During the summer season people are very busy with selling galeli harvested from Palm trees available in their farms. Galeli season starts by the end of February and continues till end of May. During this 4 months, there is a galeli fair in the morning at the village main entrance and buyers from different parts of city and district comes to Bhatha for galeli. Bhatha's fame for Indian Plum - "Bor" has given it a name as "Bor Bhatha" to distinguish it from another Bhatha in Surat which is known as "Chapra Bhatha".

== Religious practices of Bhatha ==
Very large majority of Bhatha is full of Patels. All Patels in Bhatha owns big lands and possess good property to their treasure. People in Bhatha are in Hindu majority. There are different Hindu temples in Bhatha which are worshipped in different parts of the village. One of the most ancient temple is of Lord Shiva. This temple is situated in a street called as "Navi odi". Shivling in this temple is believed to be Svayambhu (Sanskrit: स्वयम्भू / स्वयंभू) means "self-manifested".

All marriage rituals are performed as mentioned in Hindu mythology. Patels in Bhatha are very firm about getting their children marry in either same village or in village adjacent to Bhatha known as "Bhatpore". During marriages whole village is invited to attend the weddings and give blessings to the bride and groom. Apart from invitation card - a person is hired who goes to every house to invite for dinner.

Apart from Patels, there are good number of Parsis in Bhatha. Parsis are believed to be staying in Bhatha for more than 100 years. They follow Zoroastrianism and have their temple in Bhatha called as Agiyari.

== Architecture in Bhatha ==
Most of the houses in Bhatha are constructed in pure Parsi architecture. There is Fire temple "Agiyari" in Bhatha which as per Parsi Calendar was constructed in the year 1912. There are houses in Bhatha which were constructed in the era of 1800. The houses are very well constructed, airy and have peaceful atmosphere.
