= Valook Weir =

Diversion dam in Kerala, India

Valook Weir is a small diversion dam constructed across Kavadippuzha in Naripatta panchayath of Kozhikode district in Kerala, India. It is one of the two weirs of Vilangad SHEP. It is located 85 km away from Kozhikode town. It is a run- off the river scheme utilizing water of Vaniyampuzha and Kavadipuzha. The weir has a height of 7.9 metres (26 ft) from deepest foundation and a length of 45.95 metres (150.8 ft).

== Power project ==
It is a 7.5 MW (3 x 2.50 MW) power project built on Vaniyampuzha and Kavadipuzha, the tributaries of Mahe river, with an investment of Rs 59.49 crore INR. The project consists of dams at Panoth and Valookku and two canals (1750 meter long Valook Canal and 2850 meter long Panoth canal) and a fore-bay tank with a penstock pipe. This Along with three 2.5 MW generators creates the Power and the water flows through a 124-meter tailrace channel. The power generated is conveyed to Nadapuram substation which is 14 kilometers away from the power house.

== Specifications ==
- LocationLatitude:11⁰45’36.5”N
- Longitude:75⁰46’32.5”E
- Panchayath : Naripatta
- Village: Thinur
- District:Kozhikode
- River Basin : Mahe puzha
- River: Kavadi puzha
- Release from Dam to river : Mahe puzha
- Taluk through which release flows Vadakara
- Year of completion : 2014
- Name of Project : Vilangad Small Hydro Electric Project
- Purpose of Project : Hydro Power

Dam Features

- Type of Dam : Concrete gravity
- Classification : weir
- Maximum Water Level (MWL):EL 184.96 m
- Full Reservoir Level ( FRL) : EL 183.90 m
- Storage at FRL : Diversion only
- Height from deepest foundation : 7.90m
- Length :45.95m
- Spillway : 2 Nos. 1.50 x 1.30 m
- Crest Level : EL 183.90 m
- River Outlet: NIL
- Officers in charge & phone No. : Executive Engineer, KG Division, Kakkayam, PIN-673615 Phone.9446008466
- Installed capacity of the Project : 7.5 MW
