= Yusuf Parmar =

Indian politician

Deputy Mayor of Gandhinagar Municipal Corporation
- Incumbent
- Assumed office 2010

Personal details
- Born: Gandhinagar, India
- Party: Indian National Congress
- Profession: Politician

Yusuf Parmar is former Deputy Mayor of Gandhinagar, India and a senior Indian National Congress politician.

== See also ==
- Bharatiya Janata Party
