= SCB =

SCB may refer to:

== Organisations ==
- Saunders College of Business, a college at Rochester Institute of Technology in Rochester, New York, US
- Schola Cantorum Basiliensis, a music academy in Basel, Switzerland
- Secunderabad Cantonment Board, a civic authority of Secunderabad, India
- Securities Commission of the Bahamas
- Ship Characteristics Board, a US Navy body (1945 – c. 1970)
- Society for Conservation Biology, organization concerned with conserving biological diversity
- Solomon Cordwell Buenz, an international architecture firm based in Chicago, Illinois, US
- Southern Cross Broadcasting, an Australian television broadcaster
- Standing Council of the Baronetage, a British organization for baronets
- Statistics Sweden (Swedish: Statistiska centralbyrån, lit. 'Central Statistics Bureau'), a Swedish government department

=== Banks ===
- Shanghai Commercial Bank, a commercial bank headquartered in Hong Kong
- Siam Commercial Bank, a commercial bank headquartered in Bangkok, Thailand
- Standard Chartered, a British bank headquartered in London
- Sai Gon Joint Stock Commercial Bank, a Vietnamese commercial bank headquartered in Ho Chi Minh City, Vietnam

== Sports ==
- SC Bern, a Swiss ice hockey team
- SC Bastia, soccer club in Bastia, France
- S.C. Braga, soccer club in Braga, Portugal
- Speedway Control Bureau or Speedway Control Board, a British motorcycle racing organization
- Stock Car Brasil, Brazilian motor racing series

== Other uses ==
- Serbo-Croat-Bosnian or Serbo-Croatian, a pluricentric South Slavic language
- Standard Colloquial Bengali, of the Bengali language
- Surat City Bus, bus service in Surat, Gujarat, India
- Survey of Current Business, a monthly publication of the US Bureau of Economic Analysis
