= Godsamba =

- Neighbourhood
- Country: India
- State: Gujarat
- District: Surat

Government
  - Body: Surat Municipal Corporation

Languages
  - Official: Gujarati, Hindi
- Time zone: UTC+5:30 (IST)
- PIN: 394163
- Telephone code: 91261-XXX-XXXX
- Vehicle registration: GJ
- Lok Sabha constituency: Surat
- Civic agency: Surat Municipal Corporation
- Website: gujaratindia.com

Godsamba is a village located in Surat, Gujarat, India.

== See also ==
- List of tourist attractions in Surat
