= Nirav Shah (disambiguation) =

Nirav Shah (born 1974) is an Indian cinematographer.

Other notable people named Nirav Shah include:

- Nirav Shah (Indian politician), former deputy mayor of Surat Municipal Corporation
- Nirav D. Shah (born 1977), an American epidemiologist and politician
