= Somnath Urban Development Authority =

Urban development authority in Gujarat, India

Urban development authority overview
- Formed: 2025
- Jurisdiction: Government of Gujarat
- Headquarters: Somnath, Gujarat, India
- Parent department: Urban Development and Urban Housing Department, Government of Gujarat

Somnath Urban Development Authority (SUDA) is a statutory urban planning authority responsible for the planned development of the Somnath urban region in the state of Gujarat, India. The authority was constituted by the Government of Gujarat in 2025 to oversee urban, tourism, and infrastructure development in the region.

== History ==
The Somnath Urban Development Authority was established in 2025 through a notification issued by the Government of Gujarat as part of efforts to strengthen planned urban development and manage increasing pilgrimage-driven growth in the Somnath region. The creation of the authority is part of a broader trend in Gujarat of establishing dedicated urban development authorities for rapidly growing urban and pilgrimage centres.

== Jurisdiction ==
SUDA governs the Somnath urban region located in Gir Somnath district. The district was formed in 2013, with Somnath serving as its administrative headquarters. The authority's jurisdiction includes: Somnath Municipal Council and surrounding villages.

== Functions ==
The authority performs statutory urban planning and development functions, including:

- Preparation and implementation of development plans
- Regulation of land use and zoning
- Execution of town planning schemes
- Development of urban infrastructure such as roads, water supply, and drainage systems

SUDA is also involved in planning tourism-related infrastructure in the Somnath region, including development of areas surrounding major religious sites.

== Significance ==
The authority plays a role in facilitating planned urban expansion in the Somnath region, which is an important religious tourism destination in India. Its development initiatives are linked to broader state-level efforts to improve infrastructure and visitor facilities in major pilgrimage centres.

== See also ==
- Urban Development Authority (India)
- Somnath Temple
- Veraval Municipal Council
