= Narippatta Gram Panchayat =

Narippatta Grama Panchayat Narippatta
- village
- Location in Kerala, India Narippatta Grama Panchayat (India)
- Coordinates: 11°42′N 75°42′E
- Country: India
- State: Kerala
- District: Kozhikode

Languages
  - Official: Malayalam, English
- Time zone: UTC+5:30 (IST)
- PIN: 673507
- Telephone code: 0496
- Vehicle registration: KL 18
- Nearest city: Nadapuram
- Lok Sabha constituency: Vatakara

Narippatta is a village and a Grama Panchayath in the north of Kozhikode district, Kerala, India.

== Politics ==
Narippatta is a part of Nadapuram assembly constituency, which is part of Vatakara (Lok Sabha constituency)

Babu K	President of Narippatta Gramapanchayath
Beena V K	vice president of Narippatta gramapanchayath
Muraleedharan	Member of Parliament
EK Vijayan	Member of Legislative Assembly

Member of Grama Panchayath ( 2015–2020)

== Hospitals ==
- Primary Health Centre Narippatta(Arayakkool)

== Educational institutions ==
- GOVERNMENT ITI NARIPPATTA-(Kaiveli-vallithara)
- RNMHSS Narippatta (Transformer mukku)
- GSTS LP school thinoor (mullambath)
- Cheekkonnu UP school (kaiveli)
- Nambyathamkund LP School
- Narippatta UP School (Kuniya poyil School)
- Narippatta MLP School (Palliyath School Thazhe Narippatta)
- Narippatta North LP School ( Orappil School Thazhe Narippatta)
- Narippatta South LP School ( Manniyoor Thazhe School)

== Masjids ==
- Cheekkonnu Salafi Masjid
- Kandothkuni Juma Masjid
- Nambiythamkundu Juma Masjid
- Kizhakedathvayal Masjid (Kunjippalli)
- Masjidu Thaqva thinoor
- Thazhe Narippatta(cherukavil Palli)
- Mandokandy juma masjid
- mullambath masjid
- CP Muck Juma Masjid

== Temples ==
- sree shankara narayana kshetram Thinoor
- sree muthappan kshethram irumbamthadam
- Moyiloth Sree Paradevatha - Bhadrakali Temple (Arayakkool)
- sree muthappan temble payyekandy kumbalachola
- sree subramanya swami temble payyekandy
- sree ayyappa bhajana madam eendhumkade
- sree puzhayoram bhadhrakali temble thaniyullapoyil
- Neerveli temple tazhe narippatta

== Transportation ==
Naripata village connects to other parts of India through Vatakara town on the west and Kuttiady town on the east. National highway No.66 passes through Vatakara and the northern stretch connects to Mangalore, Goa and Mumbai. The southern stretch connects to Cochin and Trivandrum. The eastern National Highway No.54 going through Kuttiady connects to Mananthavady, Mysore and Bangalore. The nearest airports are at Kannur and Kozhikode. The nearest railway station is at Vatakara. There are many public transportation menas to reach Narippetta, like bus service and jeep service. The Private bus and KSRTC bus routes are there from Kozhikode to Kaiveli(via, Kuttaidy), Kozhikode - Kaiveli (via Vadakara). The jeep services are available from Kuttaidy and Kakkattil.

== Achievements ==
- Narippatta Grama Panchayat is an ISO 9001:2015 certified panchayth. (certificate No. TQS/Q-328)
- The panchayath has won certificate of recognition and momento for 100% tax collection from the Respected minister for Local self Governance for the economic year 2017–18
- Narippatta Grama Panchayat has won the second prize in the category Sampoorna Jaivakarshika Mandalam Award in Kozhikode Dist for the outstanding performance under Organic farming programme.
- Narippatta Grama Panchayat has been appreciated for collecting 100% taxation for consecutive four years from 2017–18 to 2020–21.
- Narippatta Family Health Center, has received Kozhikode district first in Kayakalp Awards for 2021. Family health center was also awarded by DMO (H) Kozhikode for outstanding performance by a Health Center, for 2021.
- Naripatta village figures in the malayalam movie Kusruthi Kurup starring Jayaram and Meena.

== See also ==
- Vatakara
- Nadapuram
