= Nirav Shah (Indian politician) =

Indian politician

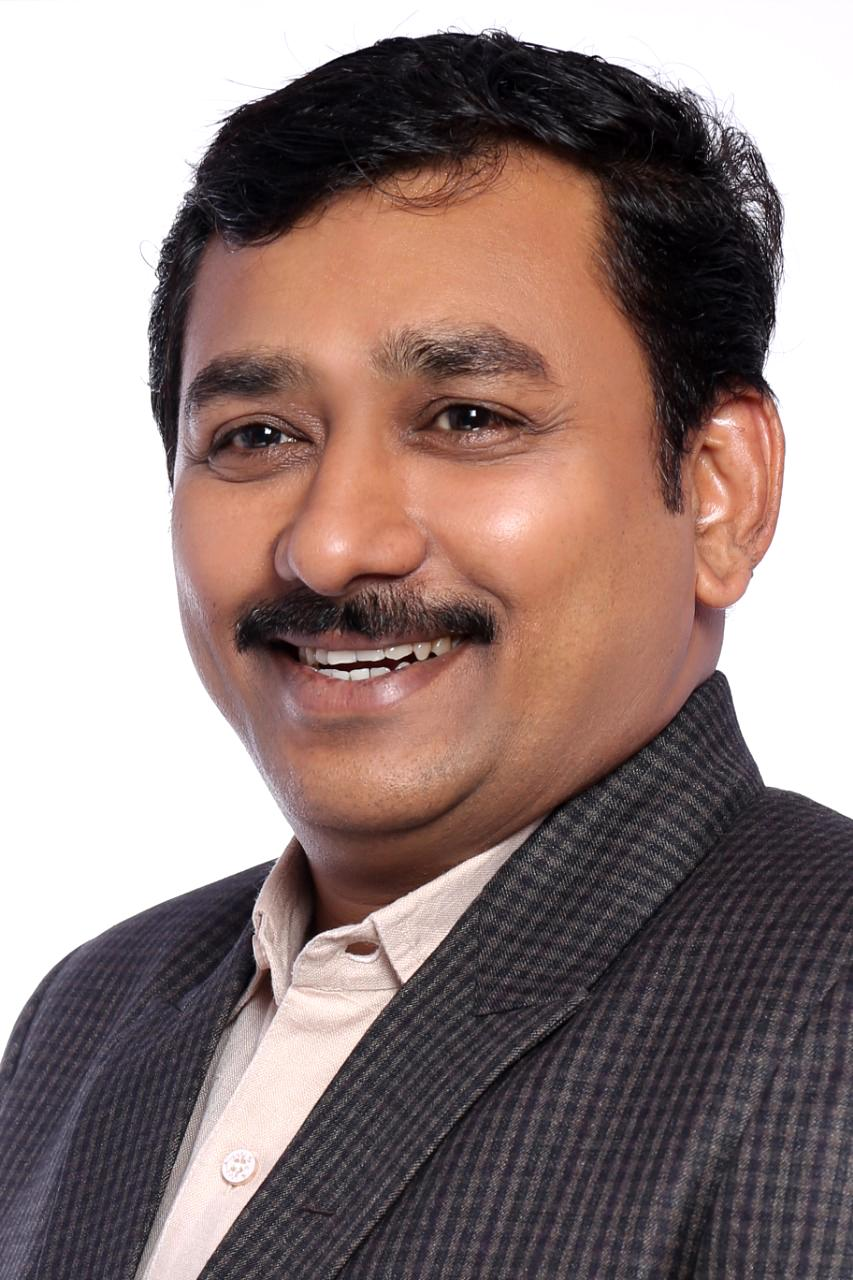

Deputy Mayors of Surat
- In office 14 June 2018 – 12 December 2020
- Preceded by: Shankarlal Vrajlal Chevli

Personal details
- Born: 1 May 1971 (age 55) Deesa,(Gujarat)
- Citizenship: India
- Party: Bharatiya Janata Party (BJP)
- Occupation: Businessman, politician
- Website: https://niravshah.in

Nirav Shah is an Indian politician who is former deputy mayor of Surat Municipal Corporation. He has been affiliated with the Bhartiya Janta Party since 1992.

== Political career ==
Nirav Shah was appointed as chairman of the standing committee of Surat Municipal Corporation (SMC) in July 2014. He was elected as deputy mayor of SMC in June 2018. Media outlets credited him for celebrating meatless day on 25 December 2018 — the day when SMC had decided to close their butcher houses for a day. He organized a massive tree plantation campaign in September 2020 on account of Prime Minister Narendra Modi's 70th birthday where 70,000 trees were plant all across Surat.

=== Controversy ===
During the 2020 coronavirus lockdown in India, Nirav Shah allegedly broke the rules of the government imposed lockdown and did not practise social distancing while meeting Jain monks for relief work of animals. A First Information Report was filed against him for violating section 144 of IPC, which prohibits meeting more than 4 persons at one place.

== Initiatives on Prime Minister Narendra Modi’s Birthday ==
Nirav Shah has organised several social initiatives through the Samprati Foundation on the occasion of the birthday of Prime Minister Narendra Modi.

In 2025, the Samprati Foundation organised “Samprati Sevayagna” in Surat during celebrations marking the Prime Minister’s 75th birthday. The initiative included health services such as blood tests and blood donation drives. As part of the programme, mobility aids including 75 wheelchairs, 75 walkers, and 75 underarm crutches were distributed to persons with disabilities.

In 2021, the Samprati Foundation launched the “NaMo Niramay” campaign on the occasion of the Prime Minister’s 71st birthday, aimed at providing subsidised medicines to citizens for a period of 171 days.

In 2020, Shah pledged to plant 70,000 trees in Surat to mark the 70th birthday of Prime Minister Narendra Modi.
