= Panoth Weir =

Diversion dam in Kerala, India

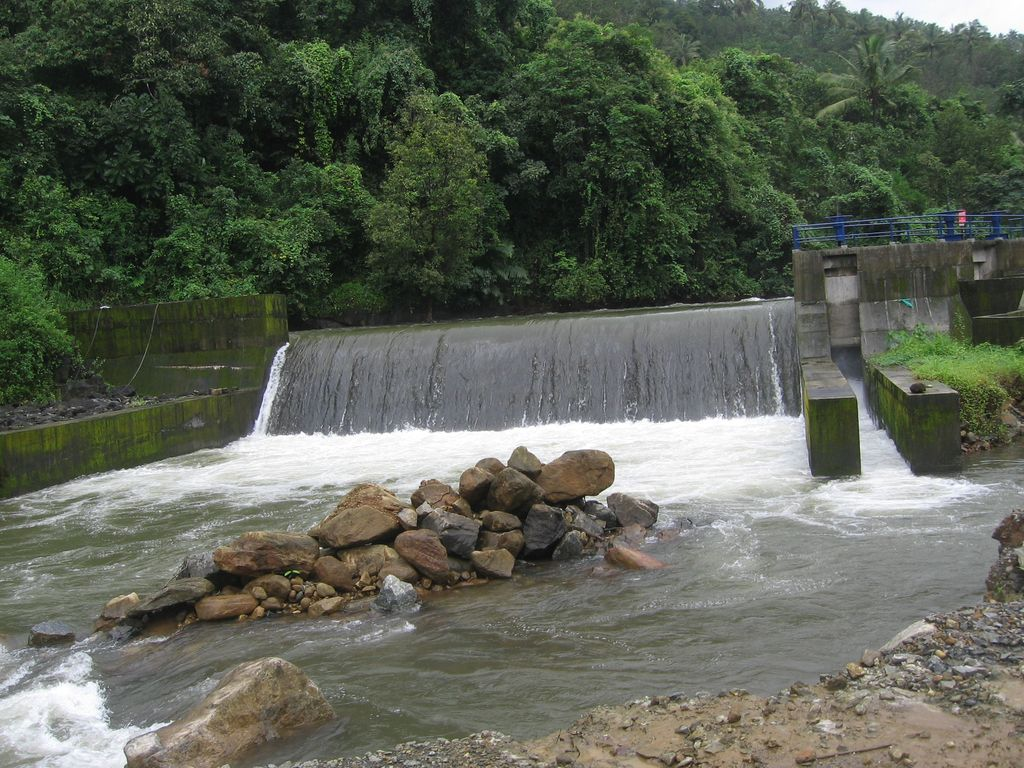
Panoth Weir

Panoth Weir is a small diversion dam across Vaniyam puzha which is a tributary of Mahe puzha at Panoth in Naripatta panchayath in Vilangad village of Kozhikode district in Kerala, India. It is the second weir of Vilangad SHEP. It is located at Panoth near Vilangad in Vadakara taluk of Kozhikode district. The project was commissioned in 2014 The weir has a height of 8.55 metres (28.1 ft) from deepest foundation and a length of 44.5 metres (146 ft)

== Power Project ==
It is a 7.5 MW (3 x 2.50 MW) power project built on Vaniyampuzha and Kavadipuzha, the tributaries of Mahe river, with an investment of Rs 59.49 crore INR. The project consists of dams at Panoth and Valookku and two canals (1750 meter long Valook Canal and 2850 meter long Panoth canal) and a fore-bay tank with a penstock pipe. This Along with three 2.5 MW generators creates the Power and the water flows through a 124-meter tailrace channel. The power generated is conveyed to Nadapuram substation which is 14 kilometers away from the power house.

== Specifications ==
Dam/Weir: PANOTH (Vilangadu SHEP)
Location	Latitude:11⁰46’36.6”N Longitude:75⁰47’9.74”E	Dam Features	
	Type of Dam	Concrete gravity	
Panchayath	Naripatta	Classification	Weir
Village	Vilangad	Maximum Water Level (MWL)	EL 186.33 m
District	Kozhikode	Full Reservoir Level ( FRL)	EL 185.05 m
River Basin	Vaniyam	Storage at FRL	Diversion only
River	Mahe puzha	Height from deepest foundation	8.55m
Release from Dam to river	Mahe puzha	Length	44.5m
Taluk through which release flows	Vadakara	Spillway	2 Nos. 1.50 x 1.30 m
Year of completion	2014	Crest Level	EL 185.05m
Name of Project	Vilangad Small Hydro Electric Project	River Outlet	1 No. sluice gate
Purpose of Project	Hydro Power	Officers in charge	Executive Engineer, KG Division, Kakkayam
Installed capacity of the Project	7.5 MW	Assistant Executive Engineer, SHEP, Kakkayam	
Project Identification Code ( PIC)	Nil		
