= Mahendrasinh Rana =

Indian politician

Mayor of Gandhinagar Municipal Corporation
- In office 2010–2015

Personal details
- Born: Gandhinagar, India
- Party: Bharatiya Janata Party
- Profession: Politician

Mahendrasinh Rana was an Indian National Congress politician, who later defected to the Bharatiya Janata Party. He was the first mayor of Gandhinagar.

== See also ==
- Gandhinagar Municipal Corporation
- Bharatiya Janata Party
