= Junagadh Municipal Corporation =

Local civic body in Junagadh, Gujarat, India

Junagadh Municipal Corporation (JuMC) Junāgadha Mahānagarapālikā

Type
- Type: Municipal corporation of Junagadh

History
- Founded: 2004; 22 years ago

Leadership
- Mayor: Dharmesh Posiya (BJP), BJP
- Municipal Commissioner: Tejas Parmar (IAS)

Structure
- Seats: 60
- Political groups: Government (48): BJP (48); Opposition (12): INC (11); IND (1)
- Length of term: 5 years

Elections
- Last election: 16 February 2025
- Next election: 2030

Meeting place
- Junagadh, Gujarat

Website
- junagadhmunicipal.org

The Junagadh Municipal Corporation (JuMC) is the civic body governing Indian city of Junagadh. Municipal Corporation mechanism in India was introduced during British Rule with formation of municipal corporation in Madras (Chennai) in 1688, later followed by municipal corporations in Bombay (Mumbai) and Calcutta (Kolkata) by 1762. Junagadh Municipal Corporation is headed by Mayor of city and governed by Commissioner.

== History and administration ==
The Junagadh Municipal Corporation was formed in 2004 to improve the infrastructure of the town, as per the needs of its local population. The Junagadh Municipal Corporation is categorised into wards, and each ward is headed by a councillor for which elections are held every five years.

The Junagadh Municipal Corporation is administered by a commissioner acting as the chief administrative head, with the assistance of the mayor and deputy mayor.

== Functions ==
The Junagadh Municipal Corporation is created for the following functions:

- Planning for the town, including its surroundings, which are covered under its Department's Urban Planning Authority
- Approving construction of new buildings and authorising use of land for various purposes
- Improving of the town's economic and social status
- Arranging the supply of water for commercial, residential and industrial purposes
- Planning for fire contingencies through Fire Service Departments
- Creating systems for solid waste management, public health and sanitary services.
- Developing ecological aspects, such as urban forestry, and creating guidelines for environmental protection
- Developing assistance for the mentally and physically handicapped, the elderly, and gender biased people
- Improving local slums and removing poverty

== Members ==
2025 Junagadh Municipal Corporation election results
#	Party	Seats
1.	BJP	48
2.	INC	11
3.	Ind	1
Total		60

=== List of Members of Corporation ===
https://jumc.gujarat.gov.in/electedbody

== Revenue sources ==
The following are the Income sources for the Corporation from the Central and State Government.

== See also ==
- List of municipal corporations in India
- Veraval Municipal Council
