= Kadodara =

- Suburb
- Location in Gujarat, India Kadodara (India)
- Coordinates: 21.172°N 72.960°E
- Country: India
- State: Gujarat
- City: Surat

Government
  - Body: Surat Municipality

Area
  - Total: 3 km^{2} (1.2 sq mi)
- Elevation: 18 m (59 ft)

Population (2001)
  - Total: 14,519
  - Density: 4,800/km^{2} (13,000/sq mi)

Languages
  - Official: Gujarati, Hindi
- Time zone: UTC+5:30 (IST)
- Vehicle registration: GJ 05
- City: Surat
- Website: gujaratindia.com

Kadodara is a Suburban area and Municipality in the Surat City in the Indian state of Gujarat. Kadodara is a junction of NH 6 and NH 8 highways and kadodara is the middle way on Surat-Bardoli road. The civil agency of Kadodara. A boom in kadodara's real estate attracted many industrialists and due to its proximity to Surat. Many residential projects are under construction in Kadodara arpit pandey

.

Kadodara is known for the famous hanumanji temple which is located nearby to the station.and also Residency project in bardoli road like Shri Niwas Green City society who cover more than 100 apartment like Shiv Residency, prince residency, opera, and also school named vidhya bharti high school. The nearest airport of kadodara is surat airport.

== Demographics ==
As of 2001 India census, Kadodara had a population of 14,819. Males constitute 68% of the population and females 32%. Kadodara has an average literacy rate of 68%, higher than the national average of 59.5%: male literacy is 77%, and female literacy is 50%. In Kadodara, 12% of the population is under 6 years of age.

== See also ==
- List of tourist attractions in Surat
