= Surat City Bus =

- Parent: Surat Municipal Corporation
- Founded: 2007
- Service area: Surat, India
- Service type: Commuter bus
- Fleet: 1136
- Daily ridership: 3.50 Lakhs
- Fuel type: Diesel; CNG; Electric

Surat City Bus is the name under which city buses are operated in Surat, Gujarat, India. It is operated by a private entity-'Sitilink' under a public private partnership model for the Surat Municipal Corporation (SMC). The model is based on an earlier model by the Ahmedabad Municipal Transport Service (AMTS) which operated bus services in Ahmedabad on a public-private partnership, but subsequently failed. In 2012, the Government of Gujarat announced that it would set up similar transport facilities in 180 cities across the state under a public-private partnership.

== History ==
In 1997, the Surat Municipal Corporation had submitted a feasibility report to the Government of Gujarat, for privatisation of bus services in Surat city, as existing services being operated by the state-run Gujarat State Road Transport Corporation (GSRTC) were found to be loss-making and insufficient for the city. In 1999, the GSRTC inaugurated a new bus stand and office at Udhna for city and rural bus services in and around the city.

== Operations ==
In August 2007, the SMC entered into an agreement with a private entity to provide bus services for a period of five years. These buses were referred to as Redline buses and were fueled by compressed natural gas (CNG). In 2013, the SMC was unable to find a new operator, forcing it to extend the existing agreement by a few months. Subsequently, Redline services were suspended because the operator could not break even with the service. This reportedly affected 80,000 commuters per day across the city. In July 2013, the SMC launched a new line of services labelled Blueline buses, operated by a different operator. A total of 120 bus stops were constructed by the SMC prior to the Blueline buses being flagged off. The Blueline service is expected to run 125 buses for six years. The passenger number has risen from 3,000 to 65,000 and the SMC's revenue, too, shot up from ₹46,000 to ₹600,000 daily. The ministry said that in Surat city the model shift of passengers from autorickshaw to city bus is about 86.91 per cent. At least 6.18 per cent of two-wheel passengers, 0.67 per cent of car users and nearly 5 per cent of other passengers have started using city buses.

== Fleet ==
It consists of 1136 buses and runs on 66 different routes, covering 85 per cent of urban area. More than 3.50 lakh passengers use public transport daily.
