= Kayakalp Award =

- Awarded for: Health centers in India
- Sponsored by: Government of India
- First award: 2015
- Final award: 2024

The Kayakalp Award is an award presented by the Indian Ministry of Health and Family Welfare to recognize health centers that promote cleanliness, hygiene, and infection control as an extension of the Swachh Bharat Mission in India. Upon its initial May 2015 founding, the award was limited to district hospitals, but between 2016 and 2017, eligible recipients were expanded to include public health centers and urban health facilities.

== Types ==
The Ministry of Health and Family Welfare presents a Best District Hospital Award for each state and union territory of India, presenting additional runner-up awards for areas with more than 25 district hospitals:

State	Number of District Hospitals	Amount of Cash Award
Category A	10 – 25	Rs. 50.00 lakhs – Winner
Category B	26 – 50	Rs. 50.00 lakhs – Winner, Rs. 20.00 lakhs – Runner-Up
Category C	> 50	Rs. 50.00 lakhs – Winner, Rs. 20.00 lakhs – First Runner-Up, Rs. 10.00 lakhs – Second Runner-Up

Additionally, the Ministry of Health and Family Welfare presents a Best Community Health Center and Sub-District Hospital Award for each state and union territory. In areas with more than ten district hospitals, the Ministry awards two of these awards. Lastly, the Ministry of Health and Family Welfare recognizes the Best Primary Health Center in each district of India.

== Criteria ==
The Ministry of Health and Family Welfare selects recipients based on the facility's upkeep, sanitation, waste management, infection control, support services, and hygiene promotion. Facilities are graded on standardized metrics and only those that receive at least a 70% score are eligible to be picked by state-level review boards.
