= Gandhinagar =

Capital city of Gujarat, India

- State capital city
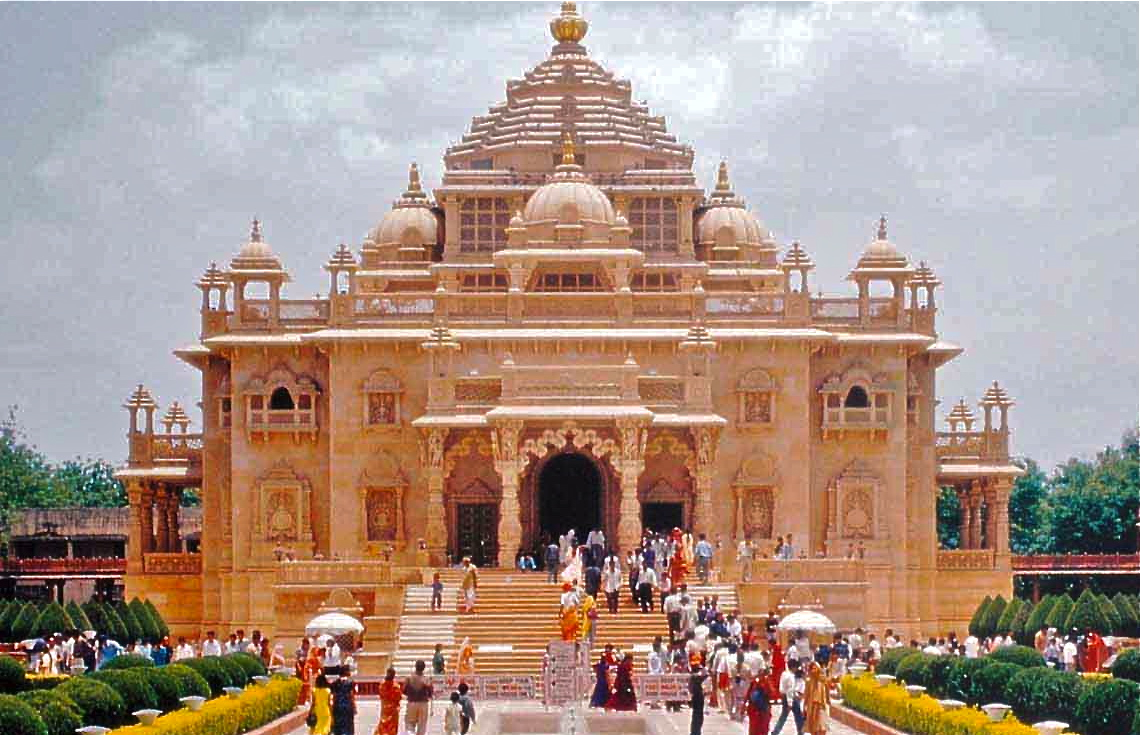
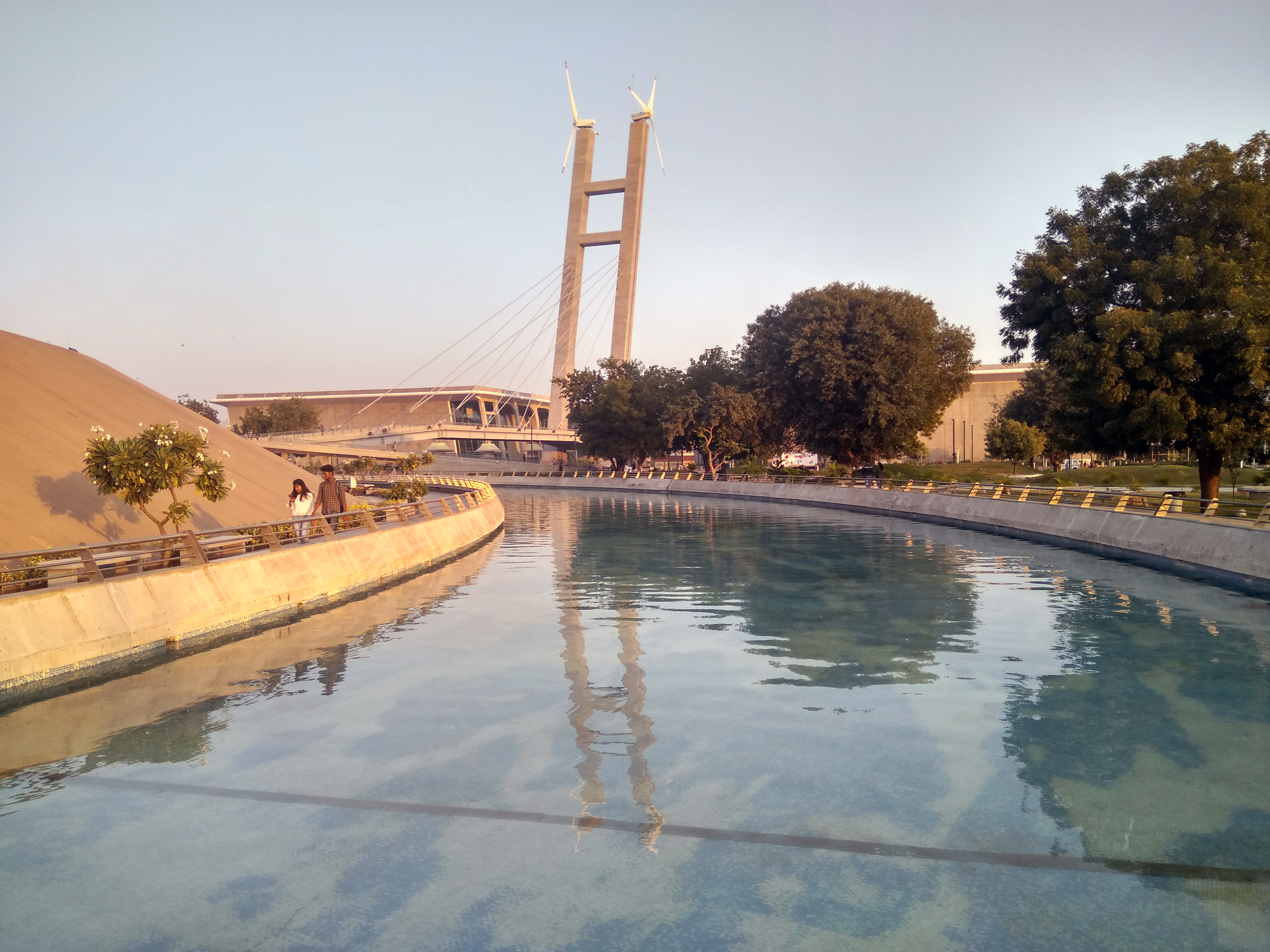
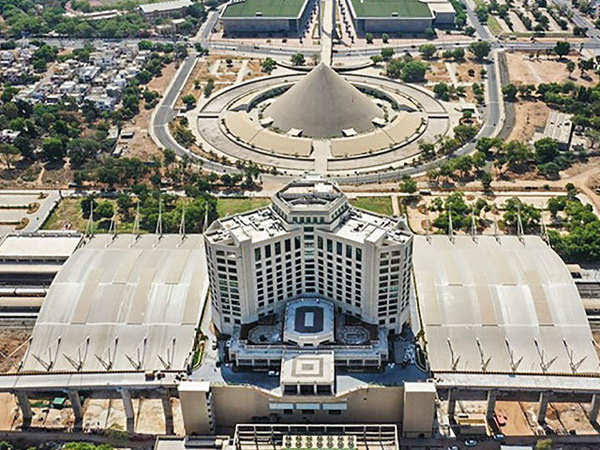
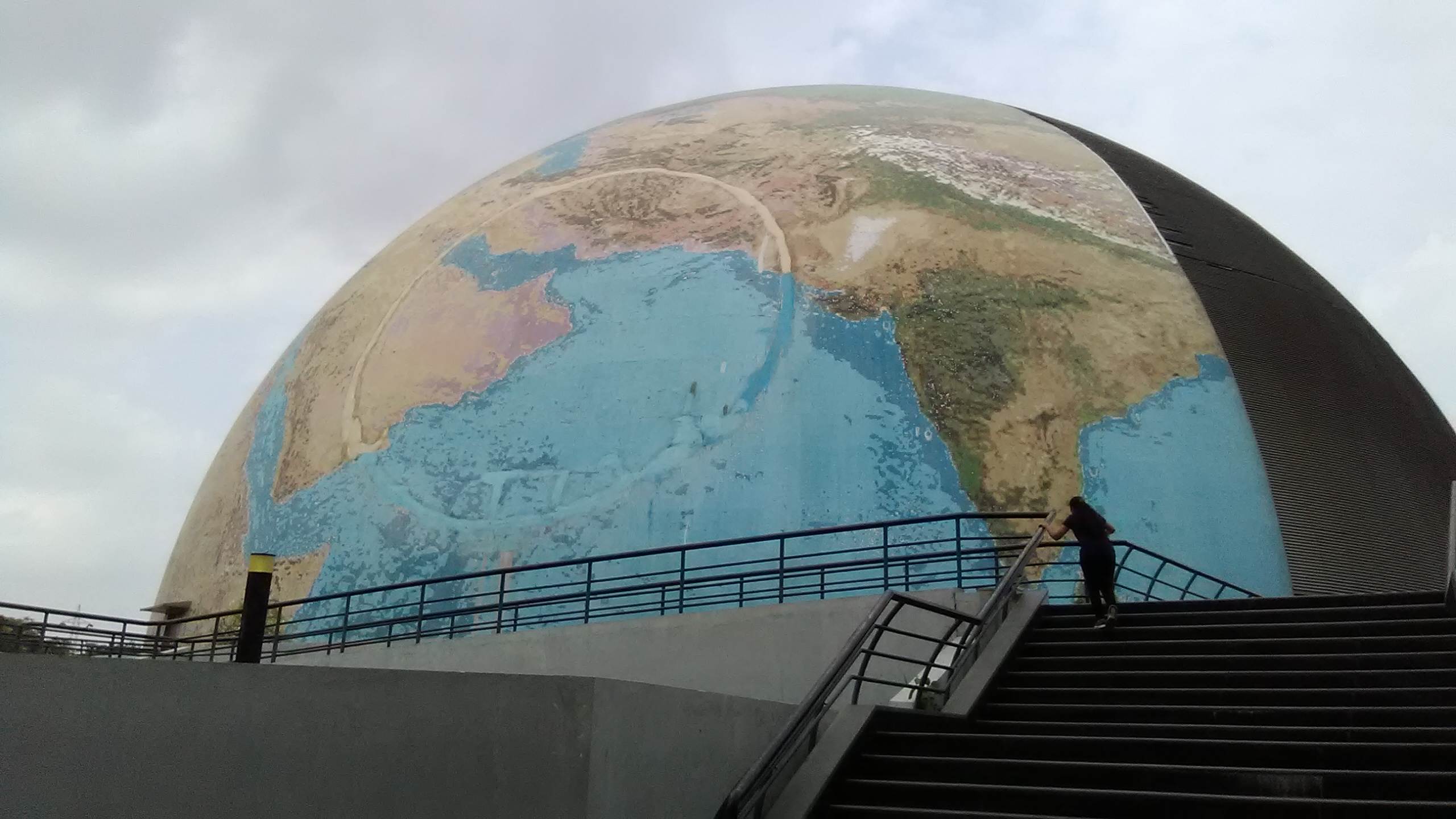
- Clockwise, from top: Akshardham Temple, Gandhinagar Capital railway station, Gujarat Science City, Mahatma Mandir Convention Centre

- Logo of the Gandhinagar Municipal Corporation
- Interactive map of Gandhinagar
- Location in Gujarat Location in India Location in Asia
- Coordinates: 23°13′23″N 72°39′00″E
- Country: India
- State: Gujarat
- District: Gandhinagar
- Region: North Gujarat
- Established: 16th March, 1960
- Named for: Mahatma Gandhi

Government
  - Type: Mayor–Council
  - Body: Gandhinagar Municipal Corporation
  - Mayor: Meeraben Patel (BJP)
  - Member of Parliament: Amit Shah, BJP

Area
  - Total: 326 km^{2} (126 sq mi)
- Elevation: 81 m (266 ft)

Population (2011)
  - Total: 292,167
  - Density: 896/km^{2} (2,320/sq mi)

Languages
  - Official: Gujarati; Hindi
- Time zone: UTC+5:30 (IST)
- PIN CODE: 382010
- Telephone code: 079
- Vehicle registration: GJ-18
- Website: gujaratindia.com

Gandhinagar (Gujarati: gāndhīnagara, pronounced [ˈɡɑːndʱinəɡəɾ(ə)]) in India is the capital of the state of Gujarat and of Gandhinagar district. Gandhinagar is located approximately 23 kilometres (14 mi) north of Ahmedabad, on the west central point of the industrial corridor between the megacities of Delhi and Mumbai.

Gandhinagar lies on the west bank of the Sabarmati River, about 545 kilometres (339 mi) north of Mumbai and 901 kilometres (560 mi) southwest of Delhi. The Akshardham temple is located in Gandhinagar. There was a determination to make Gandhinagar a purely Indian enterprise, partly because the state of Gujarat was the birthplace of Mahatma Gandhi. For this reason, the planning was done by two Indian town planners: Prakash M Apte and H. K. Mewada, who had apprenticed with Le Corbusier in Chandigarh.

== Etymology ==
The name of the city means "Gandhi's city" and it is named after Mahatma Gandhi.

== History ==
The city was planned by Chief Architect H.K. Mewada, a Cornell University graduate, and his assistant Prakash M Apte. It was developed in the 1960s.

== Demographics ==
According to the 2011 census of India, Gandhinagar had a population of 208,299. Males constitute 53% of the population and females 47%. Gandhinagar has an average literacy rate of 90%. Male literacy is 91%, and female literacy is 89%. In Gandhinagar, 11% of the population is under 6 years of age. Over 95% of the population of Gandhinagar are Hindus.

== Geography ==
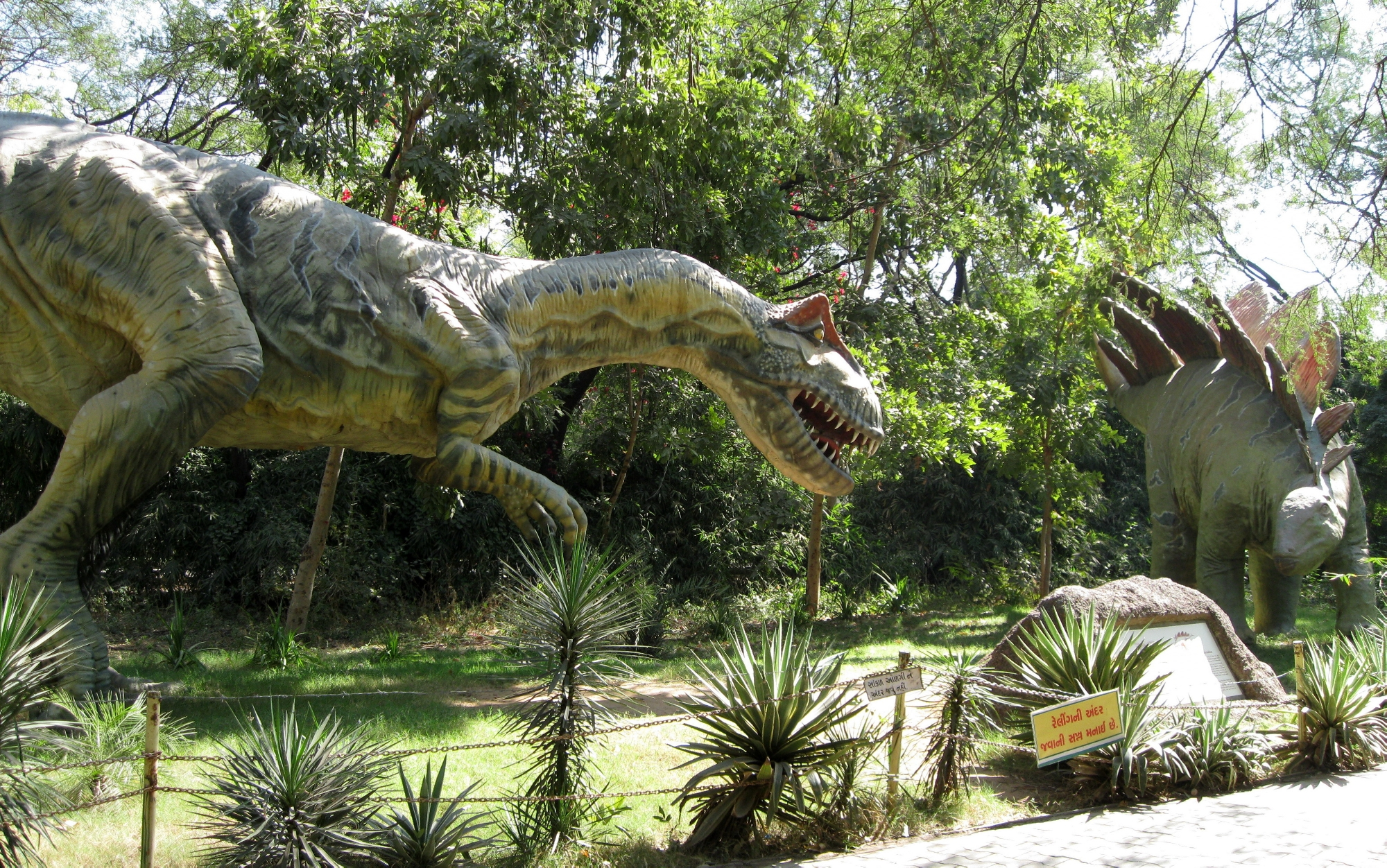
Indroda Dinosaur and Fossil Park

Gandhinagar has an average elevation of 81 metres (266 feet). The city sits on the banks of the Sabarmati River, in north-central-east Gujarat. The 20,543 km^{2} area around Gandhinagar is defined by Gujarat capital territory. Gandhinagar spans an area of 326 km^{2} (126 sq mi). The river frequently dries up in the summer, leaving only a small stream of water. Gandhinagar is India's tree capital with 54% green cover on its land area.

== Climate ==
Gandhinagar

Climate chart (precipitation, max. and min. temperature)
J	F	M	A	M	J	J	A	S	O	N	D
0.5 28 12	0 31 15	0.8 36 19	0.7 39 24	1.3 42 28	91 39 29	284 33 27	271 32 26	110 33 25	13 35 22	1.8 33 17	0.6 29 12
- █ Average max. and min. temperatures in °C
- █ Precipitation totals in mm
Imperial conversion
J	F	M	A	M	J	J	A	S	O	N	D
0 82 53	0 88 58	0 97 66	0 103 75	0.1 107 82	3.6 102 83	11 92 80	11 89 78	4.3 92 77	0.5 95 71	0.1 91 63	0 85 54
- █ Average max. and min. temperatures in °F
- █ Precipitation totals in inches

Gandhinagar has a hot semi-arid climate (Köppen BSh) with three main seasons: summer, monsoon and winter. The climate is generally dry and hot outside of the monsoon season. The weather is hot to severely hot from March to May when the maximum temperature stays in the range of 36 to 42 °C (97 to 108 °F), and the minimum in the range of 19 to 27 °C (66 to 81 °F). It is pleasant in the winter days and quite chilling in the night during December to February. The average maximum temperature is around 29 °C (84 °F), the average minimum is 13 °C (55 °F), and the climate is extremely dry. The southwest monsoon brings a humid climate from mid-June to mid-September. The average annual rainfall is around 773.6 mm (30.46 in).

Climate data for Gandhinagar (1991–2020)
Month	Jan	Feb	Mar	Apr	May	Jun	Jul	Aug	Sep	Oct	Nov	Dec	Year
Record high °C (°F)	34.5 (94.1)	38.1 (100.6)	43.2 (109.8)	44.6 (112.3)	48.0 (118.4)	45.0 (113.0)	40.5 (104.9)	36.7 (98.1)	41.0 (105.8)	39.2 (102.6)	37.4 (99.3)	36.5 (97.7)	48.0 (118.4)
Mean daily maximum °C (°F)	27.8 (82.0)	31.0 (87.8)	35.9 (96.6)	39.4 (102.9)	41.8 (107.2)	38.9 (102.0)	33.4 (92.1)	31.8 (89.2)	33.2 (91.8)	35.2 (95.4)	32.5 (90.5)	29.4 (84.9)	34.6 (94.3)
Mean daily minimum °C (°F)	11.6 (52.9)	14.7 (58.5)	19.1 (66.4)	24.0 (75.2)	27.9 (82.2)	28.5 (83.3)	26.6 (79.9)	25.7 (78.3)	25.2 (77.4)	21.8 (71.2)	17.2 (63.0)	12.4 (54.3)	21.6 (70.9)
Record low °C (°F)	3.6 (38.5)	3.1 (37.6)	7.0 (44.6)	14.5 (58.1)	19.2 (66.6)	19.0 (66.2)	21.3 (70.3)	20.0 (68.0)	19.4 (66.9)	12.5 (54.5)	7.6 (45.7)	4.4 (39.9)	3.1 (37.6)
Average rainfall mm (inches)	0.5 (0.02)	0.0 (0.0)	0.8 (0.03)	0.7 (0.03)	1.3 (0.05)	91.0 (3.58)	284.1 (11.19)	270.8 (10.66)	109.5 (4.31)	12.5 (0.49)	1.8 (0.07)	0.6 (0.02)	773.6 (30.46)
Average rainy days	0.1	0.0	0.1	0.1	0.0	3.6	10.9	10.3	5.4	1.0	0.3	0.1	31.9
Source: India Meteorological Department

== Governance and politics ==
Religions in Gandhinagar City (2011)
Religion	Percent
Hinduism	94.46%
Islam	3.29%
Others	2.25%

On 1 May 1960, Gujarat was created out of the 17 northern districts of the former State of Bombay. These districts were further subdivided later on. There are 33 administrative districts in the state. Gandhinagar is a political hub for the state of Gujarat.

Congress won the first municipal election in 2011. Mahendrasinh Rana became the first mayor of the city. The current Member of the Lok Sabha for Gandhinagar is Amit Shah from the Bharatiya Janata Party (BJP).

Gandhinagar is also situated near the west command post of the Indian Army and Indian Air force and also has a command centre in the city.

Gandhinagar has recently developed the Gujarat State Emergency Disaster Management centre.

== Transport ==
=== Air ===
Sardar Vallabhbhai Patel International Airport located in Ahmedabad is 18 km away from Gandhinagar, providing both domestic and international flights.

=== Rail ===
Gandhinagar Capital railway station (GNC) is located in Sector 14. Many trains running on the western zones pass through Gandhinagar. Currently, there are five trains running from this station in which three are express trains and two are MEMU trains. Jaipur-Bandra Garib Rath, Haridwar mail for Delhi and Haridwar and Shanti Express for Indore Junction BG are main express trains running through this station.

Ahmedabad Railway Station (ADI) in Kalupur Ahmedabad is the nearest rail junction (25 km away) which provides connectivity with all the major cities and towns of India. The Indian Railways transports are available for moving in northern India and eastern India from Kalol Junction railway station (KLL).

Gandhinagar Capital railway station

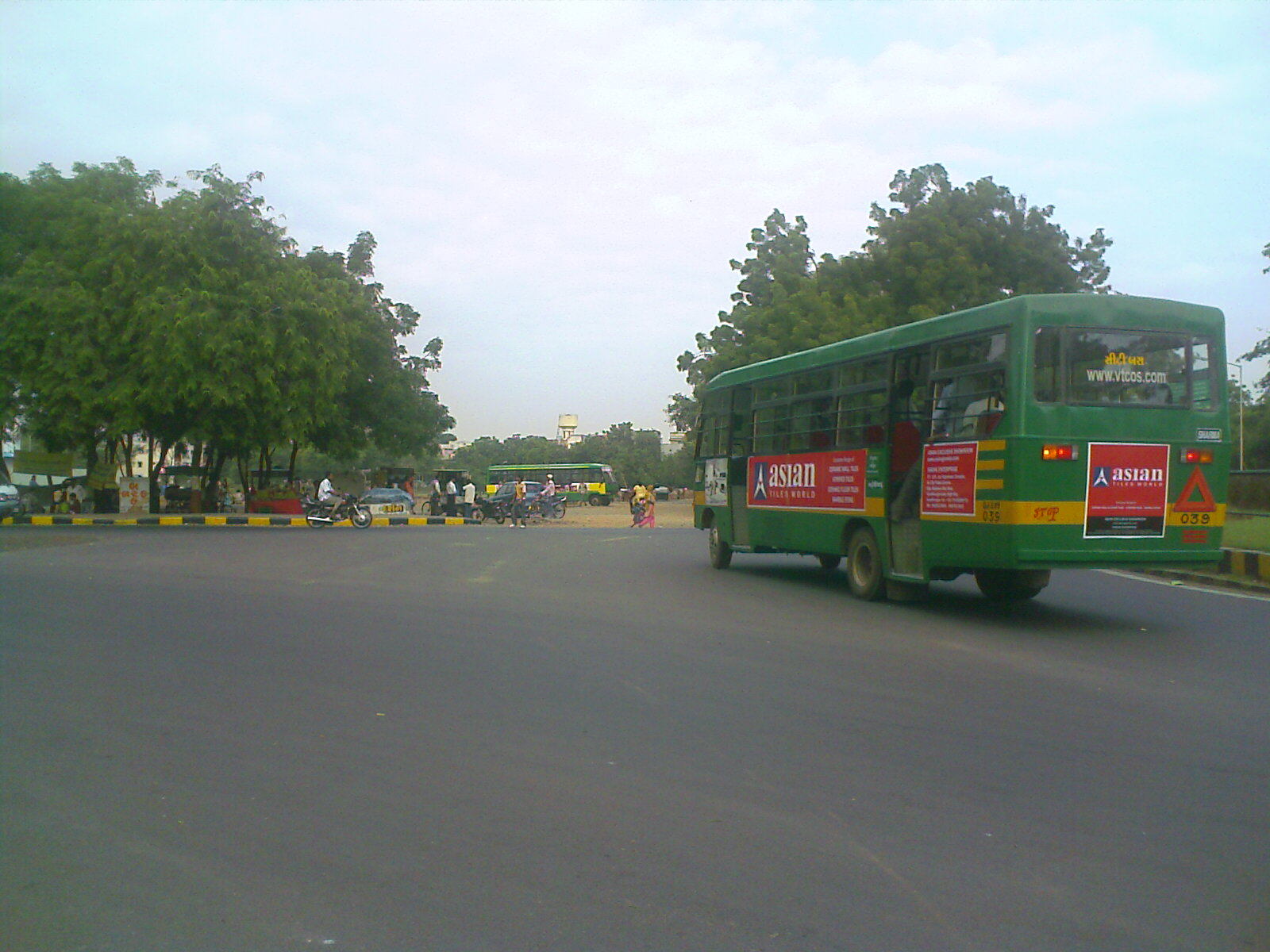
Gandhinagar City Bus

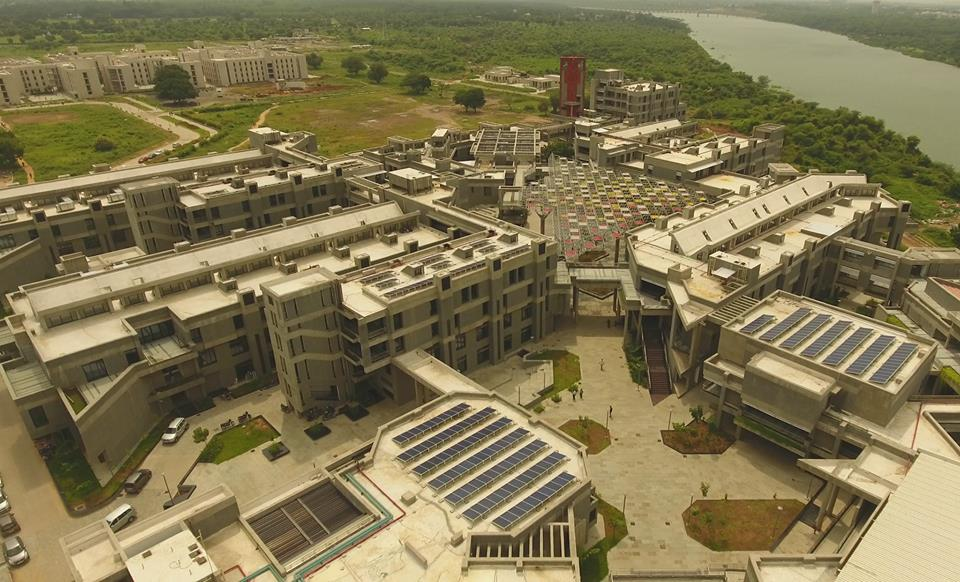
Indian Institute of Technology Gandhinagar

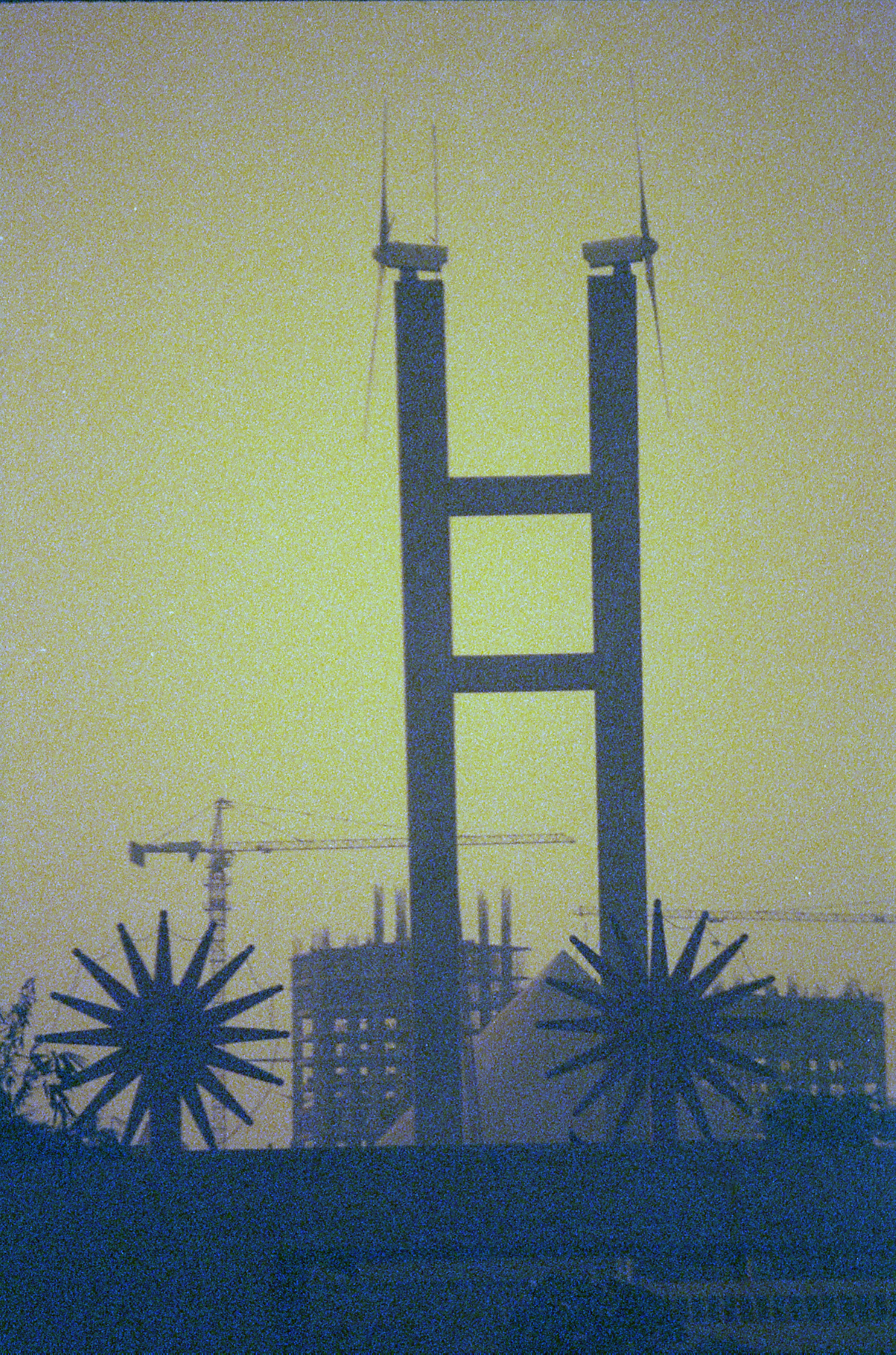
Mahatma Mandir as seen from Swarnim Park

The Leela Gandhinagar hotel above Gandhinagar Capital railway station

==== Metro ====
Under Phase II of the Ahmedabad Metro, total 22.8 km long network connecting Gandhinagar with Ahmedabad is being constructed. The north–south line of the Ahmedabad Metro is being extended from Motera station to Mahatma Mandir station. A branch line will connect GNLU station to GIFT City station.

== See also ==
- Patan
- Software Technology Parks of India (STPI)
- Gujarat National Law University (GNLU)
