= Veraval Municipal Council =

Local civic body in Veraval, Gujarat, India

Veraval Municipal Council Verāval Nagarpālikā

Type
- Type: Municipal Council
- Term limits: 5 years

History
- Founded: 1950; 76 years ago

Leadership
- President: Naresh Gohel, BJP
- Vice President: Hemiben Jethva, BJP
- Chief Officer: Paras Makwana, GAS

Structure
- Seats: 44
- Political groups: Government (24): BJP (24); Opposition (20): INC (20)

Elections
- Voting system: First past the post
- Last election: 2026
- Next election: 2031

Motto
- Service with Devotion

Meeting place
- Som Bhavan, Veraval

Website
- VMC

The Veraval Municipal Council, officially known as Somnath Municipal Council, is the municipal governing body of the city Veraval in the Indian state of Gujarat. Established in 1950, it is responsible for the administration of civic infrastructure and public services in the city, including water supply, sanitation, road maintenance, and urban planning. It consists of elected representatives from 11 municipal wards, with a total of 44 councillors forming a council. According to the Census of India 2011, Veraval has a population of 185,797.

== History ==
Prior to the independence of India in 1947, Veraval was part of the princely state of Junagadh in the Kathiawar region, which functioned under indirect British rule.

Administration in Junagadh State was carried out under the authority of the Nawab, with local governance managed through appointed officials rather than elected municipal bodies. Civic functions such as maintenance of roads, sanitation, and port-related activities were overseen by state authorities.

After integration, the region came under the administrative framework of the former Bombay State. During this period, urban local bodies in smaller towns were governed under laws such as the Bombay Municipal Boroughs Act, 1925, which provided the statutory basis for municipal administration.

The Veraval Municipal Council was formally established in January 1950 as part of efforts to introduce elected local governance and modern civic administration in the region.

Following the reorganisation of states in 1960 and the formation of Gujarat, the municipal body came under the Gujarat Municipalities Act, 1963, which continues to regulate municipal councils in the state.

The role of the municipal council was further strengthened by the 74th Constitutional Amendment Act in 1992, which granted constitutional status to urban local bodies and expanded their responsibilities.

== Administration ==
The council is headed by a president (chairperson), while administrative functions are carried out by a chief officer appointed by the Government of Gujarat.

== Functions ==
The Veraval Municipal Council performs civic and administrative functions as an urban local body in accordance with the provisions of the 74th Constitutional Amendment Act. The functional responsibilities of municipalities in India are outlined in the Twelfth Schedule of the Constitution, which lists subjects related to urban governance.

These functions broadly include:

- Urban planning and development – including town planning and preparation of development plans
- Regulation of land use and construction – enforcement of building regulations and land-use policies
- Roads and infrastructure – construction and maintenance of roads, bridges, and public infrastructure
- Water supply – provision of water for domestic, industrial, and commercial use
- Public health and sanitation – including solid waste management, drainage, and disease control
- Environmental management – urban forestry, protection of the environment, and ecological initiatives
- Fire and emergency services – coordination of fire protection services
- Urban poverty alleviation and welfare – including development programs for weaker sections
- Slum improvement and urban housing – upgrading informal settlements and improving living conditions
- Public amenities – maintenance of parks, gardens, playgrounds, street lighting, and public facilities
- Cultural and social development – promotion of educational, cultural, and aesthetic activities
- Vital statistics and civic records – registration of births and deaths
- Public utilities and regulation – including burial grounds, slaughterhouses, and animal control

These functions are implemented through various municipal departments and committees, and are supported by state government agencies where required. The exact scope and execution of these responsibilities are determined by state legislation such as the Gujarat Municipalities Act, 1963.

== Structure and Composition ==
The council is a unicameral body consisting of 44 elected councillors representing 11 municipal wards.

Members are elected through the first-past-the-post voting system in elections conducted by the Gujarat State Election Commission.

=== Electoral history ===
Year	BJP	INC	Other parties	IND
2026	24	20	0	0
2021	28	13	1	2
2015	27	17	0	0
2010	5	15	1	21
2005	29	13	0	0

=== Ward-wise representation ===
Ward	Councillor	Party
1	Hemiben Jethva	Bharatiya Janata Party
1	Riddhiben Bhupta	Bharatiya Janata Party
1	Prahlad Shyamla	Bharatiya Janata Party
1	Jiten Upadhyay	Bharatiya Janata Party
2	Rizwanabanu Bhadarka	Indian National Congress
2	Aishaben Malang	Indian National Congress
2	Ahmed Bhadarka	Indian National Congress
2	Basir Gohel	Indian National Congress
3	Babiben Vala	Indian National Congress
3	Hemiben Gadhiya	Indian National Congress
3	Nareshbhai Chavda	Indian National Congress
3	Laxman Solanki	Indian National Congress
4	Chandrika Sikotariya	Bharatiya Janata Party
4	Dipikaben Kotiya	Bharatiya Janata Party
4	Paresh Kotiya	Bharatiya Janata Party
4	Yogesh Solanki	Bharatiya Janata Party
5	Ruksanaben Banva	Indian National Congress
5	Zarina Panja	Indian National Congress
5	Mohammadfarukh Mirza	Indian National Congress
5	Salman Sakhiyani	Indian National Congress
6	Nusratbanu Tajwani	Indian National Congress
6	Mohzam Panja	Indian National Congress
6	Hanifbhai Malek	Indian National Congress
6	Haji Kalu	Indian National Congress
7	Komalben	Bharatiya Janata Party
7	Priyankaben Oza	Bharatiya Janata Party
7	Brijesh Mehta	Bharatiya Janata Party
7	Pravin Rupareliya	Bharatiya Janata Party
8	Usha Dholiya	Bharatiya Janata Party
8	Shilaben Bhambhani	Bharatiya Janata Party
8	Naresh Gohel	Bharatiya Janata Party
8	Uday Shah	Bharatiya Janata Party
9	Gitaben Parmar	Bharatiya Janata Party
9	Ritaben Tanna	Bharatiya Janata Party
9	Paresh Bariya	Bharatiya Janata Party
9	Sanjay Davda	Bharatiya Janata Party
10	Manishaben Malam	Indian National Congress
10	Muskan Rathod	Indian National Congress
10	Bharatkumar Chariya	Indian National Congress
10	Mustakbhai Chauhan	Indian National Congress
11	Kamlaben Fofandi	Bharatiya Janata Party
11	Gangaben Gohel	Bharatiya Janata Party
11	Vijay Malamdi	Bharatiya Janata Party
11	Kanjibhai Jadav	Bharatiya Janata Party

== See also ==
- List of urban local bodies in Gujarat
- Somnath Urban Development Authority
