= Gandhinagar Municipal Corporation =

Local civic body in Gandhinagar, Gujarat, India

Type
- Type: Municipal corporation

History
- Founded: 16 March 2010; 16 years ago

Leadership
- Mayor: Meeraben Patel, BJP
- Deputy Mayor: Natuji Thakor, BJP
- Municipal commissioner: Shri J S Prajapati, IAS

Structure
- Seats: 44
- Political groups: Government (38) BJP (38) Opposition (6) INC (5) IND (1)

Elections
- First election: 2011
- Last election: 2026
- Next election: 2031

Website
- gandhinagarmunicipal.com

Gandhinagar Municipal Corporation is the local civic body responsible for the administration of Gandhinagar, the capital of the Indian state of Gujarat. It was set up in 2010. Gandhinagar Municipal Corporation has 326 sq km area.

== History ==
The Gandhinagar Municipal Corporation was set up on 16 March 2010 after a ruling by the Gujarat High Court in 2009. Prior to that, Gandhinagar was the only state capital in India which did not have an elected body administering it. The establishment of a Municipal Corporation to administrate and govern the city introduced municipal taxes to the residents of the city as well as made the city eligible to receive funding from the Government of India under the Jawaharlal Nehru National Urban Renewal Mission (JNNURM). The then Ministry of Urban Development at the centre, led by Saugata Roy, however refused to allot funds to the GMC under the JNNURM plan as it had already reached the maximum number of cities it could accommodate.

=== Council and elections ===
The Corporation has a council that comprises 33 seats representing various wards. The maiden election to the council was held in April 2011. The party that won majority seats in the Corporation Council was the Indian National Congress with 18 seats while the Bharatiya Janata Party, which governs the state of Gujarat won 15 council members.

The election was the first in India to allow Non resident Indians (NRIs) to vote using an online platform instead of a postal ballot which was the only way non resident voters could cast their vote earlier.

The first mayor of the city was Mahendrasinh Rana, while the deputy mayor was Yusuf Parmar of the Congress, who were elected unanimously by the council.

In 2012, three members of the ruling Congress, including the mayor, defected to the BJP, giving it the majority needed to run the corporation.

== Election Results ==
2011 Municipal Election
Party	Seats won
Indian National Congress	18
Bharatiya Janata Party	15
Others	0

2016 Municipal Election
Party	Seats won	Seats +/−	Vote %
Bharatiya Janata Party	16	▲1	44.76%
Indian National Congress	16	▼2	46.93%
Others	0	Steady	8.31%

2021 Municipal Election
Party	Seats won	Seats +/−	Vote %	Swing
Bharatiya Janata Party	41	▲25	46.49%	▲1.73%
Indian National Congress	2	▼14	28.02%	▼18.91%
Aam Aadmi Party	1	▲1	21.77%	▲21.77%
Others	0	Steady	3.73%	▼4.58%

2026 Municipal Election
Party	Seats won	Seats +/−	Vote %	Swing
Bharatiya Janata Party	38	▼3	56.64%	▲10.15%
Indian National Congress	5	▲3	37.05%	▲9.03%
Independent Politician	1	▲1		

== Taxes ==
The Corporation levies property tax on the residents of the areas within its jurisdiction. It levies taxes based on localities and the income of the residents.

== Functions ==
As of 2012, the Corporation had a very limited role that of sanitary activities such as clearing of garbage in the city because the Government of Gujarat was yet to transfer the land under GMC jurisdiction to the corporation from the forest, roads and buildings authorities. In 2012, the Corporation launched a facility for citizens to register grievances by sending an SMS.

=== Fire and Emergency Services ===
The Corporation also runs the Fire and Emergency Services wing of Gandhinagar City. The Gandhinagar Fire and Emergency Services (GFES) also operates in the three towns of Mansa, Dehgam and Kalol which fall outside GMC limits. It has a sanctioned strength of fifty firefighters but has five full-time staff.

=== Sanitation ===
The GMC performs basic sanitary functions such as removal of weeds, cleaning up of garbage, cleaning up drainage systems and removal of dead animals.

=== Transport ===
Out of 62 kilometres (39 miles) of roads, 57 kilometres (35 miles) of roads come within the jurisdiction of the GMC. These roads are maintained by the Roads and Buildings Department of the Government of Gujarat. In 2011, the state government decided to rename roads in the city. It was rumoured by officials that this was done to prevent the Congress-led corporation from naming roads after their leaders.

Unlike the neighbouring city of Ahmedabad, buses are run in the city by the Gujarat State Road Transport Corporation (GSRTC), private player VTCOS and the Ahmedabad Municipal Transport Service (AMTS).

=== Water Supply ===
Water Supply to the city was earlier handled by the Gujarat Water Supply and Sewerage Board (GWSSB). After the formation of the corporation, the GMC took over water supply and planned to install water meters across all consumer premises.
