= Surat Municipal Corporation =

Administrative body for the city of Surat

Surat Municipal Corporation Surata Mahānagarapālikā
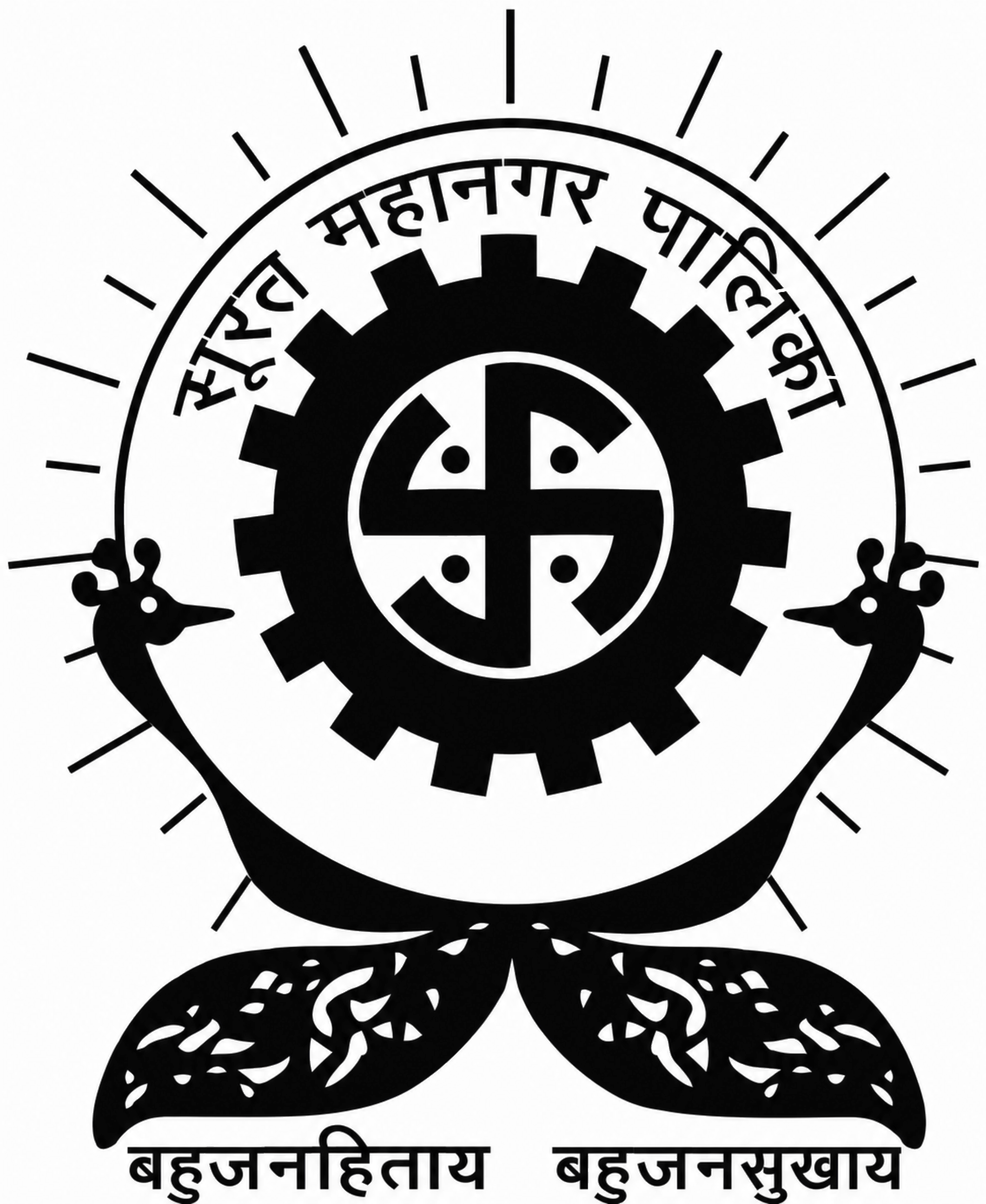
- Emblem of Surat Municipal Corporation

Type
- Type: Municipal Corporation of the Surat

Leadership
- Mayor: TBA, BJP
- Leader of opposition: TBA
- Municipal Commissioner: M. Nagarajan I.A.S.

Structure
- Seats: 120
- Political groups: Government (115): BJP (115); Opposition (5): AAP (4); INC (1)
- Length of term: 5 years

Elections
- Voting system: First past the post
- Last election: 26 April 2026
- Next election: February 2031

Meeting place
- Surat, Gujarat

Website
- www.suratmunicipal.gov.in

Surat Municipal Corporation (SMC) is the local civic body responsible for the administration of Surat, Gujarat which has come into being under the Bombay Provincial Municipal Act, 1949. The Surat Municipal Corporation was established on 2 October 1966. Surat Municipal Corporation area 462.149 km^{2}. It carries out the designated functions under the 1949 Act, with the following mission.

To make Surat a dynamic, vibrant, self-reliant and sustainable city with all basic amenities, Surat Municipal Corporation perceives its role as the principal facilitator and provider of services as detailed below to provide a better quality of people life.

== History ==
Surat Municipal Corporation is local self-government that came into being under the provisions of the Bombay Provincial Municipal Act, 1949 carries out all the obligatory and discretionary functions prescribed thereunder.

== 2026 results ==
Surat Municipal Corporation
Party	Seats won	Seats +/−	Vote %	Swing
Bharatiya Janata Party	115	▲13		▼
Aam Aadmi Party	4	▼13		▲
Indian National Congress	1	▲1		▼
Others	0	Steady		▼

== Services ==
Surat Municipal Corporation perceives its role as the principal facilitator and provider of services to provide a better quality of life.

The SMC supplies potable drinking water to the residents of Surat. The water is drawn from the River Tapi and treated at treatment plants in the city. The supplied water received ISO-9000-2008 certification in 2010.

Building homes and shelters for homeless and poor people in Surat. These homes also provide education, government benefits, social security schemes, and voter IDs to help them live a better life and find jobs to support themselves.

The SMC operates bus services in the city under a public–private partnership.

== Administration ==
The Surat Municipal Corporation operates under the Provisions of Bombay Provincial Municipal Corporations Act, 1949, under the executive power of the municipal commissioner.

The Surat Municipal Corporation ranked 7th out of 21 Cities for best administrative practices in India in 2014. It scored 3.5 on 10 compared to the national average of 3.3. It is the only city in India to disclose municipal budgets on a weekly basis.

== See also ==
- List of tourist attractions in Surat
