= 2021 Telangana local elections =

Elections in the Indian state

2021 Telangana urban local bodies elections
- 30 April 2021

126 wards/divisions across 2 municipal corporations; 122 wards across 10 municipalities
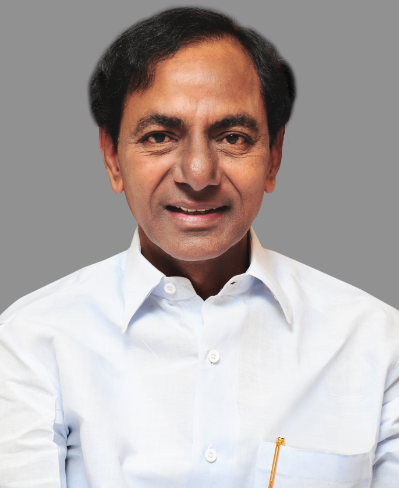

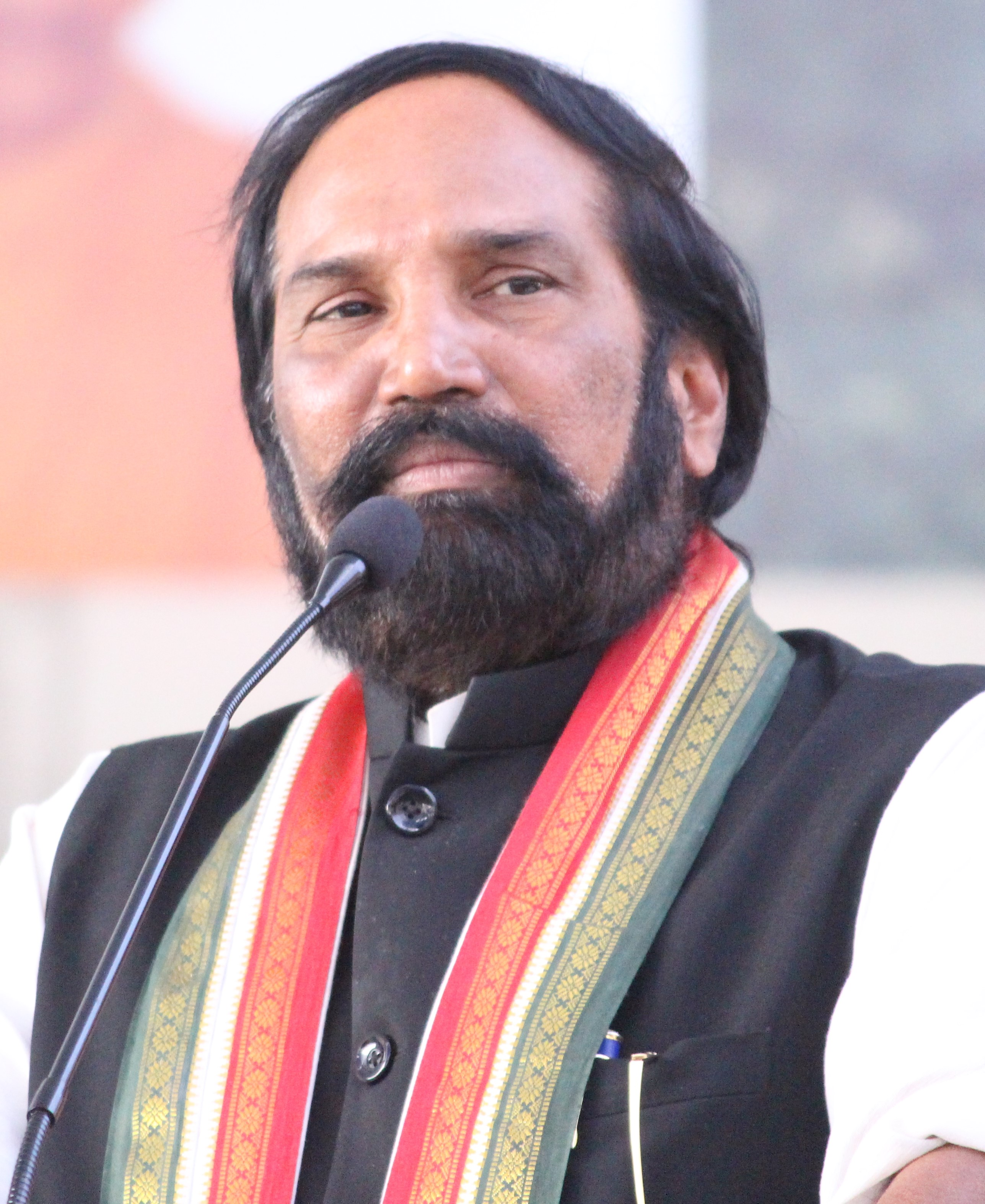
	First party	Second party	Third party
			BJP
Leader	K. Chandrashekar Rao	N. Uttam Kumar Reddy	Bandi Sanjay Kumar
Party	TRS	INC	BJP
Alliance	BRS+	UPA	None
Wards	181	23	20
Wards ±	▲54	▲2	▲17
ULBs	7	0	0
ULBs ±	▲3	Steady	Steady

Local elections were held in the Indian state of Telangana on 30 April 2021 for 2 municipal corporations and 5 municipalities, namely Warangal, Khammam, Jadcherla, Achampet, Siddipet, Kothur, and Nakrekal.

The first elections were held in newly created municipalities Jadcherla, Kothur, and Nakrekal.

== Background ==
In the previous elections (for these urban local bodies) held in 2016, the Telangana Rashtra Samithi swept all 4 urban local bodies (Khammam, Warangal, Achampet, Siddipet) by an impressive margin. The 2016 elections resulted in the wipeout of the Telugu Desam Party and the weakening of the Indian National Congress and the Bharatiya Janata Party.

== Results ==
=== By Municipal Corporation ===
Greater Warangal Municipal Corporation

Party	Seats
Telangana Rashtra Samithi	48
Bharatiya Janata Party	10
Indian National Congress	4
Others	4
Total	66
Source: The Indian Express

Khammam Municipal Corporation

Party	Seats
Telangana Rashtra Samithi	43
Indian National Congress	9
Bharatiya Janata Party	1
Communist Party of India	2
Communist Party of India (Marxist)	3
Others	2
Total	60
Source: The Indian Express

=== By Municipality ===
Achampet Municipality

Party	Seats
Telangana Rashtra Samithi	13
Indian National Congress	6
Bharatiya Janata Party	1
Communist Party of India	0
Others	–
Total	20
Source: The Indian Express

Jadcherla Municipality

Party	Seats
Telangana Rashtra Samithi	23
Bharatiya Janata Party	2
Indian National Congress	2
Others	0
Total	27
Source: The Indian Express

Kothur Municipality

Party	Seats
Telangana Rashtra Samithi	7
Indian National Congress	5
Others	0
Total	12
Source: The Indian Express

Nakrekal Municipality

Party	Seats
Telangana Rashtra Samithi	11
Indian National Congress	2
Others	7
Total	20
Source: The Indian Express

Siddipet Municipality

Party	Seats
Telangana Rashtra Samithi	36
Bharatiya Janata Party	1
All India Majlis-e-Ittehadul Muslimeen	1
Others	5
Total	43
Source: The Hindu

== See also ==
- 2020 Telangana urban local bodies elections
- Elections in Telangana
