= 2020 Telangana local elections =

Elections in the Indian state

2020 Telangana urban local bodies elections
- 2020

535 wards/divisions across 11 municipal corporations; 2,727 wards across 120 municipalities (Note: Total number of wards in municipal corporations where elections were held is the added number of the wards of 9 municipal corporations which held election on 22 January 2020, Karimnagar Municipal Corporation which held election on 24 January 2020, and Greater Hyderabad Municipal Corporation which held election on 1 December 2020.)
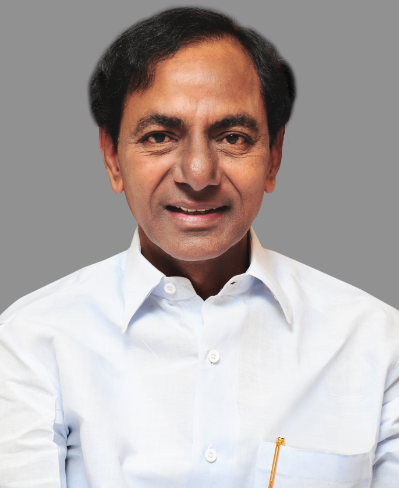

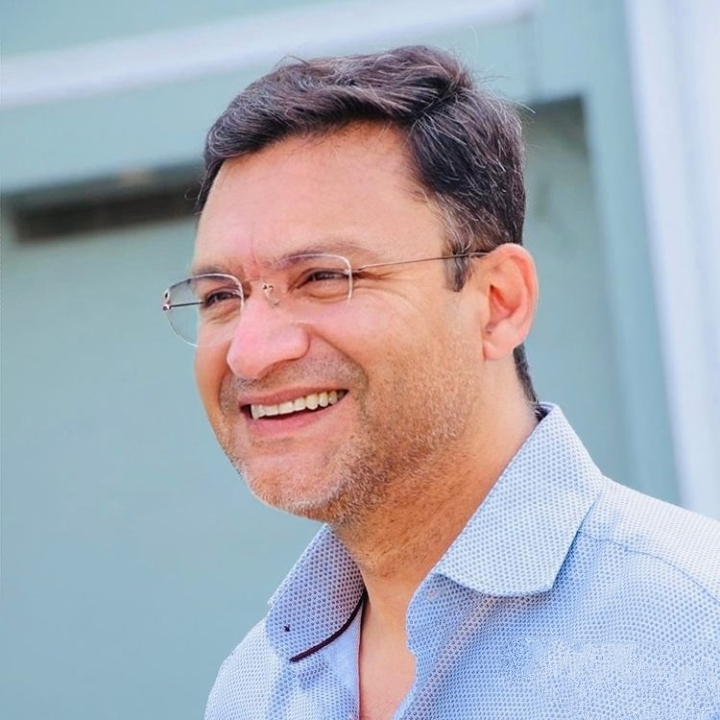

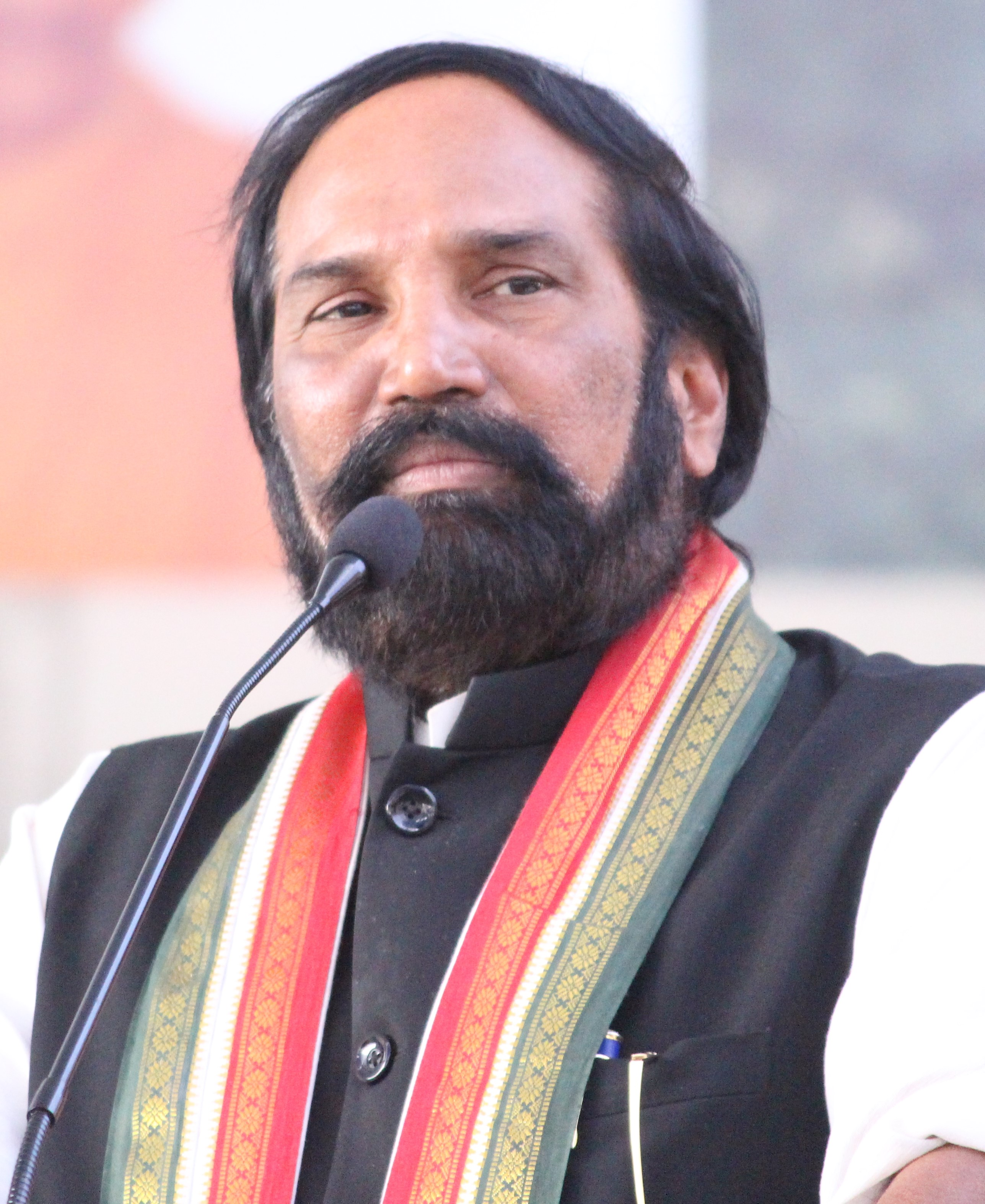

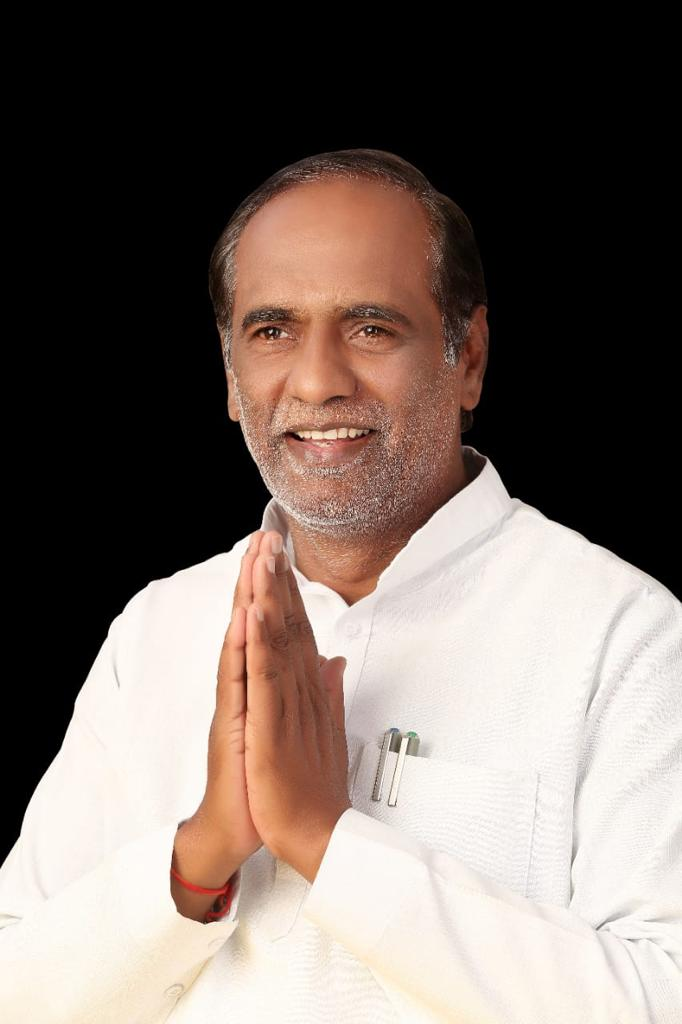
	First party	Second party	Third party
Leader	K. Chandrashekar Rao	Akbaruddin Owaisi	N. Uttam Kumar Reddy
Party	TRS	AIMIM	INC
Wards	1,686	87	569
Wards ±	TBC	TBC	TBC
ULBs	114	5	5
ULBs ±	▲89	▲15	▼14
	Fourth party
Leader	K. Laxman
Party	BJP
Wards	293
Wards ±	TBC
ULBs	4
ULBs ±	▲1

Local elections in the Indian state of Telangana were held in 2020 for 11 municipal corporations and 120 municipalities. Elections for 9 municipal corporations and 120 municipalities were held on 22 January 2020. Elections for Karimnagar Municipal Corporation were held on 24 January 2020 whereas elections for the Greater Hyderabad Municipal Corporation were held on 1 December 2020.

== Background ==
Most previous elections for the urban local bodies were held from 2014-2016. In 2014, the Telangana Rashtra Samithi won 3 municipal corporations and 22 municipalities, followed by the Indian National Congress with 19 municipalities, the Telugu Desam Party with 4 municipalities, the Bharatiya Janata Party with 3 municipalities, and the All India Majlis-e-Ittehadul Muslimeen with 1 municipality. In 2016, the TRS had swept the GHMC bagging 99 out of 150 wards, a clear two-third majority.

== Results ==
=== By municipal corporation ===
Greater Hyderabad Municipal Corporation

Party	Seats
Telangana Rashtra Samithi	56
Bharatiya Janata Party	48
All India Majlis-e-Ittehadul Muslimeen	44
Indian National Congress	2
Others	0
Total	150
Source: The Financial Express

Karimnagar Municipal Corporation

Party	Seats
Telangana Rashtra Samithi	33
Bharatiya Janata Party	13
All India Majlis-e-Ittehadul Muslimeen	6
Others	8
Total	60
Source: The Financial Express

Ramagundam Municipal Corporation

Party	Seats
Telangana Rashtra Samithi	19
Indian National Congress	11
All India Forward Bloc	9
Bharatiya Janata Party	5
Others	6
Total	50
Source: The Hans India

== See also ==
- 2016 Telangana urban local bodies elections
- 2021 Telangana urban local bodies elections
- Elections in Telangana
