= 2016 Telangana local elections =

Elections in the Indian state

2016 Telangana municipal elections
- 2016

324 municipal wards across various urban local bodies
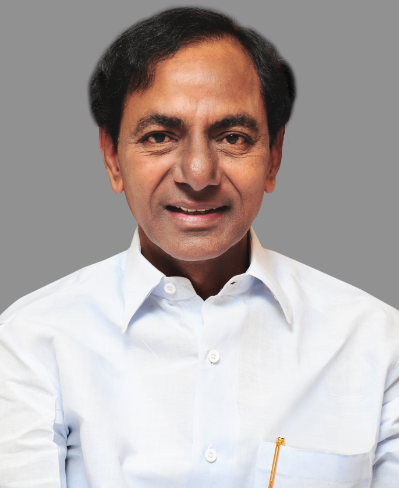

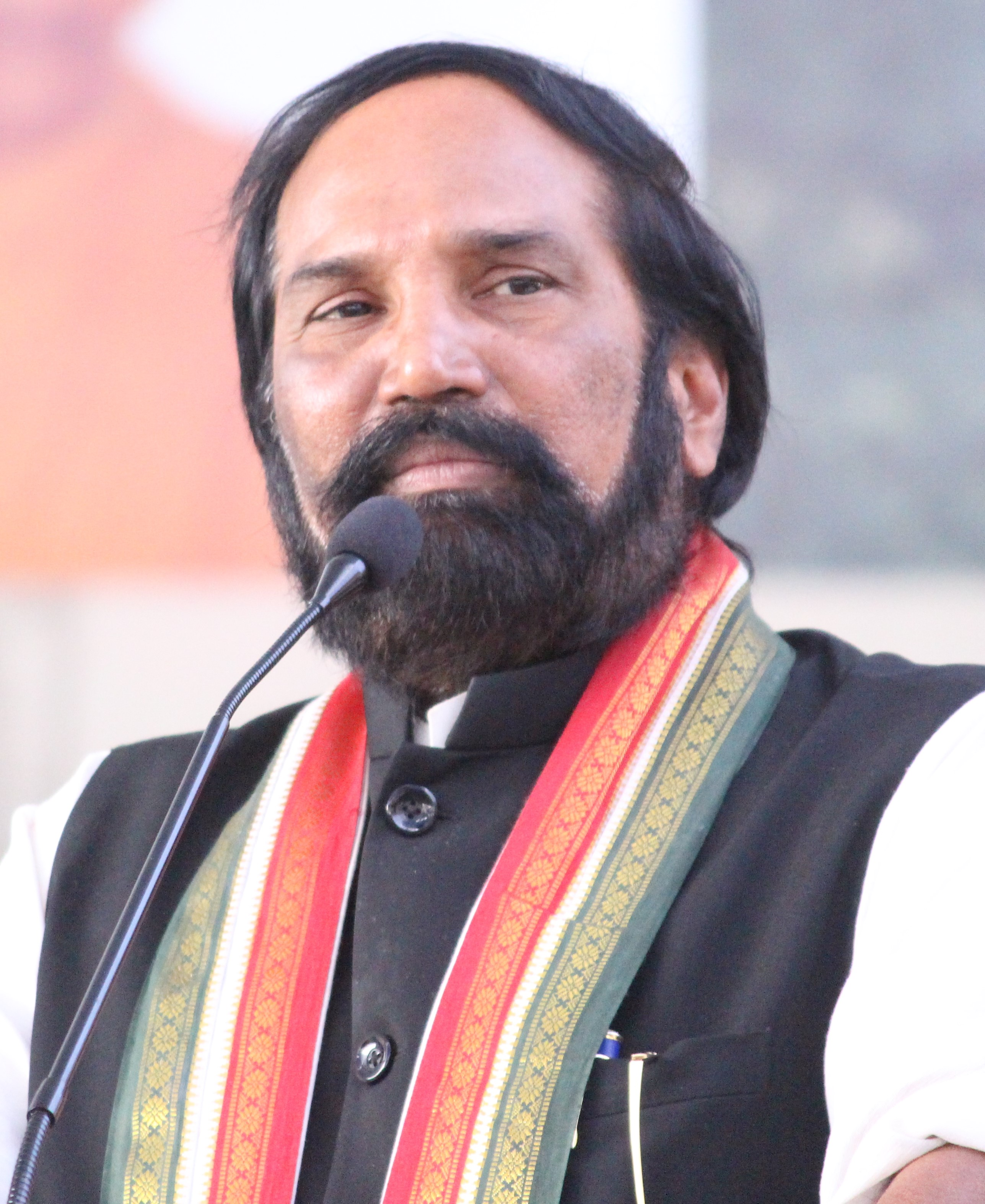

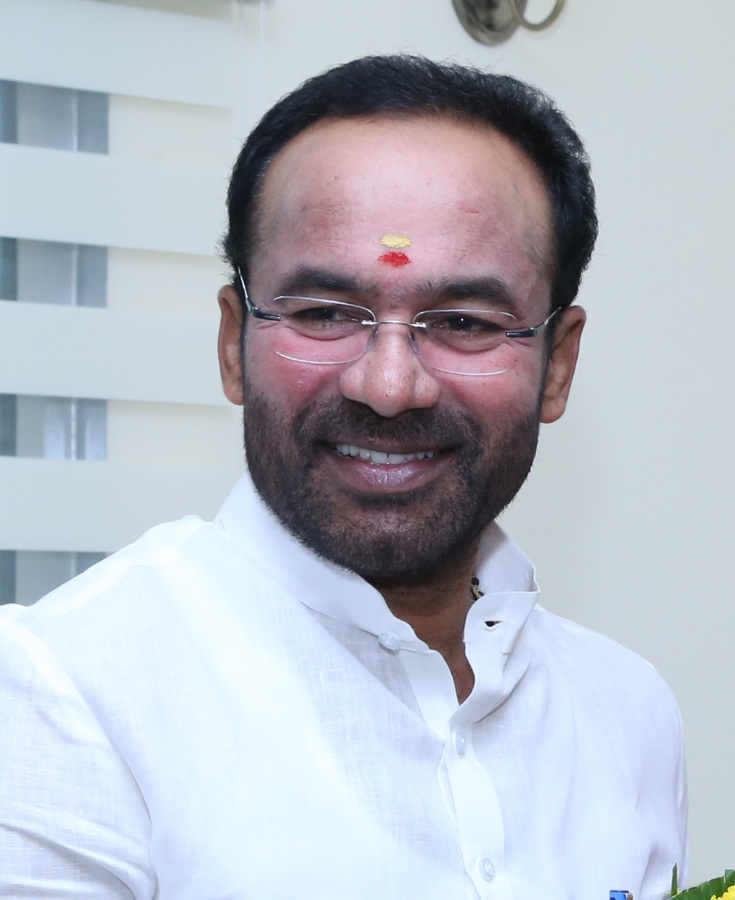
	First party	Second party	Third party
Leader	K. Chandrashekar Rao	N. Uttam Kumar Reddy	G. Kishan Reddy
Party	TRS	INC	BJP
Wards	226	23	7
Wards ±	▲226	▼29	▲2
ULBs	5	0	0
ULBs ±	▲5	Steady	Steady

Local elections were held in the Indian state of Telangana in 2016 for 3 municipal corporations and 3 municipalities. Elections for Greater Hyderabad Municipal Corporation were held on 2 February 2016, Greater Warangal Municipal Corporation, Khammam Municipal Corporation and Achampet Municipality in March 2016, and Siddipet Municipality in April 2016.

== Background ==
In previous GHMC elections held in 2009, the Indian National Congress won 52 seats, followed by the Telugu Desam Party with 45 seats, and All India Majlis-e-Ittehadul Muslimeen won 43 seats. The Congress party and AIMIM formed the government together.

== See also ==
- 2014 Andhra Pradesh urban local bodies elections
- 2020 Telangana urban local bodies elections
- Elections in Telangana
