= Devuni Kadapa =

Devuni Kadapa (Patha Kadapa) Old Kadapa City
- Historical site
- Nickname: Threshold to Tirupati Venkateswara Temple
- Interactive map of Devuni Kadapa
- Coordinates: 14°29′29″N 78°50′9″E
- Country: India
- State: Andhra Pradesh
- City: Kadapa

Government
  - Body: Kadapa Municipal Corporation

Languages
  - Official: Telugu
- Time zone: UTC+5:30 (IST)
- PIN: 516001
- Telephone code: 08562
- Vehicle registration: AP04

Devuni Kadapa is a part of Kadapa City and a historical site. It is also known as Patha Kadapa, meaning Old Kadapa. It is famous for its temple of Sri Lakshmi Venkateswara Swami.

== Toponymy ==
The name "Devuni Kadapa" is derived from the word gadapa, which means "threshold" or "door sill". The pilgrims who wanted to visit the Tirumala Venkateswara Temple, located in Tirupati, had to first visit the Lakshmi Venkateswara Swami Temple in Devuni Kadapa, hence gaining its name.

== History ==
Kadapa is named after the word Gadapa which is originated from the words "Devuni Gadapa" means "Threshold of the entrance for The Lord Venkateswara Swamy". The Idol of the Lord Venkateswara has been established by Kripacharya, hence the ancient name of Devuni kadapa is also mentioned in puranas as "Kripavathi Kshetram". Sri Lakshmi Venkateshwara Temple stands as an example of Vijayanagara architecture. It is said that Tallapaka Annamacharya visited this place and all the Sankaracharyas of the Advaita Mutt and the great poet Kshetrayya also visited this place. This temple was undertaken by the Tirumala Tirupati Devasthanam.

== Transport ==
It has the nearest railway station of Kadapa. The nearest airport is the Kadapa Airport which is located in the outskirts of the city and is about 9.5 km from Devuni Kadapa.
