= Kadapa Municipal Corporation =

Local civic body in Kadapa, Andhra Pradesh, India

Type
- Type: Municipal Corporation of the Kadapa

History
- Founded: 2005

Leadership
- Mayor: Vacant (since 18 March 2026)
- Deputy Mayor: Vacant (since 18 March 2026)
- Municipal commissioner: Sri G.Surya Sai Praveenchand I.A.S
- Seats: 50

Elections
- Last election: 1 November 2026
- Next election: TBH

Website
- Kadapa Municipal Corporation

Kadapa Municipal Corporation is the civic body that governs the city of Kadapa in the Indian state of Andhra Pradesh. It is one of the oldest Municipalities of the state, constituted in the year 1868 and was upgraded to Corporation in 2004. Its jurisdiction encompasses an area of 164.08 km2 (63.35 sq mi). Established in the year 2004, the executive power of the corporation is vested in the Municipal Commissioner, appointed by the Government of Andhra Pradesh which is currently held by Sri G. Surya Sai Praveenchand.

== History ==
Kadapa is one of the oldest municipalities in the Indian state of Andhra Pradesh. It is located in the Rayalaseema region, and is the district headquarters of Kadapa district. It was constituted as a III–Grade municipality in 1868. It was then upgraded to II–Grade in 1958 and Special Grade in 1980. It covers an area of 6.84 km^{2}. It was upgraded as Municipal Corporation on 17 November 2004 vide G.O.Ms.No.481, dated : 17.11.2004 with an area of 91.05 km^{2}. subsequently vide G.O.Ms.No.125, dated : 17.03.2005 and G.O.Ms.No.89, MA, dated : 30.05.2006 the area of corporation was increased to 164.08 km2 (63.35 sq mi) by merging surrounding gram panchayat. The population of the city in the 2001 Census of India was (2,87,093) and the approximate population in the 2011 Census of India was 3,44,078.

== Jurisdiction ==
The municipal corporation has an area of 164.08 square kilometres (63.35 sq mi).

== List of Mayors ==
Sno.	Mayor	DY Mayor	Tenure			Political Party	Election	Ref.
Sno.	Mayor	DY Mayor	Took office	Left office	Duration	Political Party	Election	Ref.
1	Pochimareddy Ravindranath Reddy		2005	2010	5 years	Indian National Congress		
2	Kothamaddi Sureshbabu	B.Arifulla	2014	2019	5 years	YSR Congress Party	2014	
2	Kothamaddi Sureshbabu	1.Bandi Nityanandareddy; 2.Sd.Mumthajbegam	2021	2025	4.8 years	YSR Congress Party	2021	
3	Paka Suresh	1.Bandi Nityanandareddy; 2.Sd.Mumthajbegam	2025	2026		YSR Congress Party		

=== 2021 elections ===
Party name	Symbol	Won	Change
YSR Congress Party		48	Steady
Telugu Desam Party		1	Steady
Jana Sena Party		1	Steady

== Civic administration ==
The area of Kadapa Municipal Corporation is 164.08 km^{2} (63.35 mi^{2}). The corporation is administered by an elected body headed by the Mayor. The corporation population as per the 2011 census was 3,44,078. The present commissioner of the corporation is G.Surya Sai Praveenchand I.A.S. and the mayor is Kothamaddi Suresh Babu.

== Public services ==
The Kadapa Municipal Corporation provides drinking water to the public and its per capita water supply per day is 120 LPCD. It has 3 public parks, secondary schools, elementary schools and many other services including colleges, playgrounds etc.

== Functions ==
Kadapa Municipal Corporation is created for the following functions:

- Planning for the town including its surroundings which are covered under its Department's Urban Planning Authority .
- Approving construction of new buildings and authorising use of land for various purposes.
- Improvement of the town's economic and Social status.
- Arrangements of water supply towards commercial, residential and industrial purposes.
- Planning for fire contingencies through Fire Service Departments.
- Creation of solid waste management, public health system and sanitary services.
- Working for the development of ecological aspect like development of Urban Forestry and making guidelines for environmental protection.
- Working for the development of weaker sections of the society like mentally and physically handicapped, old age and gender biased people.
- Making efforts for improvement of slums and poverty removal in the town.

== Revenue sources ==
The following are the Income sources for the corporation from the Central and State Government.

=== Revenue from taxes ===
Following is the Tax related revenue for the corporation.

- Property tax.
- Profession tax.
- Entertainment tax.
- Grants from Central and State Government like Goods and Services Tax.
- Advertisement tax.

=== Revenue from non-tax sources ===
Following is the Non Tax related revenue for the corporation.

- Water usage charges.
- Fees from Documentation services.
- Rent received from municipal property.
- Funds from municipal bonds.

== Kadapa Municipal Elections ==
=== 2021 Ordinary Elections ===
After 2014, third Kadapa Municipal Corporation elections were held in March 2021.

S.No.	Party Name	Symbol	Won	Change
1	YSR Congress Party		48	▲6
2	Telugu Desam Party		1	▼7
3	Independents		1	Steady
4	Jana Sena Party		0	Steady
5	Bharatiya Janata Party		0	Steady

=== 2014 Ordinary Elections ===
The second Kadapa Municipal Corporation elections were conduced in 2014.

S.No.	Party Name	Symbol	Won	Change
1	YSR Congress Party		42	Steady
2	Telugu Desam Party		8	Steady
3	Bharatiya Janata Party		0	Steady
