= Ameen Peer Dargah =

Sufi dargah (or shrine) in Kadapa City, India

- Arabic: امین پیر درگاہ; Telugu: అమీన్ పీర్ దర్గా - పెద్ద దర్గా
- Location in Andhra Pradesh

Religion
- Affiliation: Islam
- Ecclesiastical or organisational status: Dargah

Location
- Location: Kadapa, Andhra Pradesh
- Country: India
- Coordinates: 14°29′06″N 78°49′27″E

Architecture
- Architect: Pilgrimage
- Style: Islamic architecture

Ameenpeer Dargah is a Sufi dargah (or shrine) located in Kadapa City in Andhra Pradesh, India.

== See ==
- rict
- Andhra Muslims
