= Kadapa =

City in Andhra Pradesh, India

Kadapa Cuddapah
- City corporation
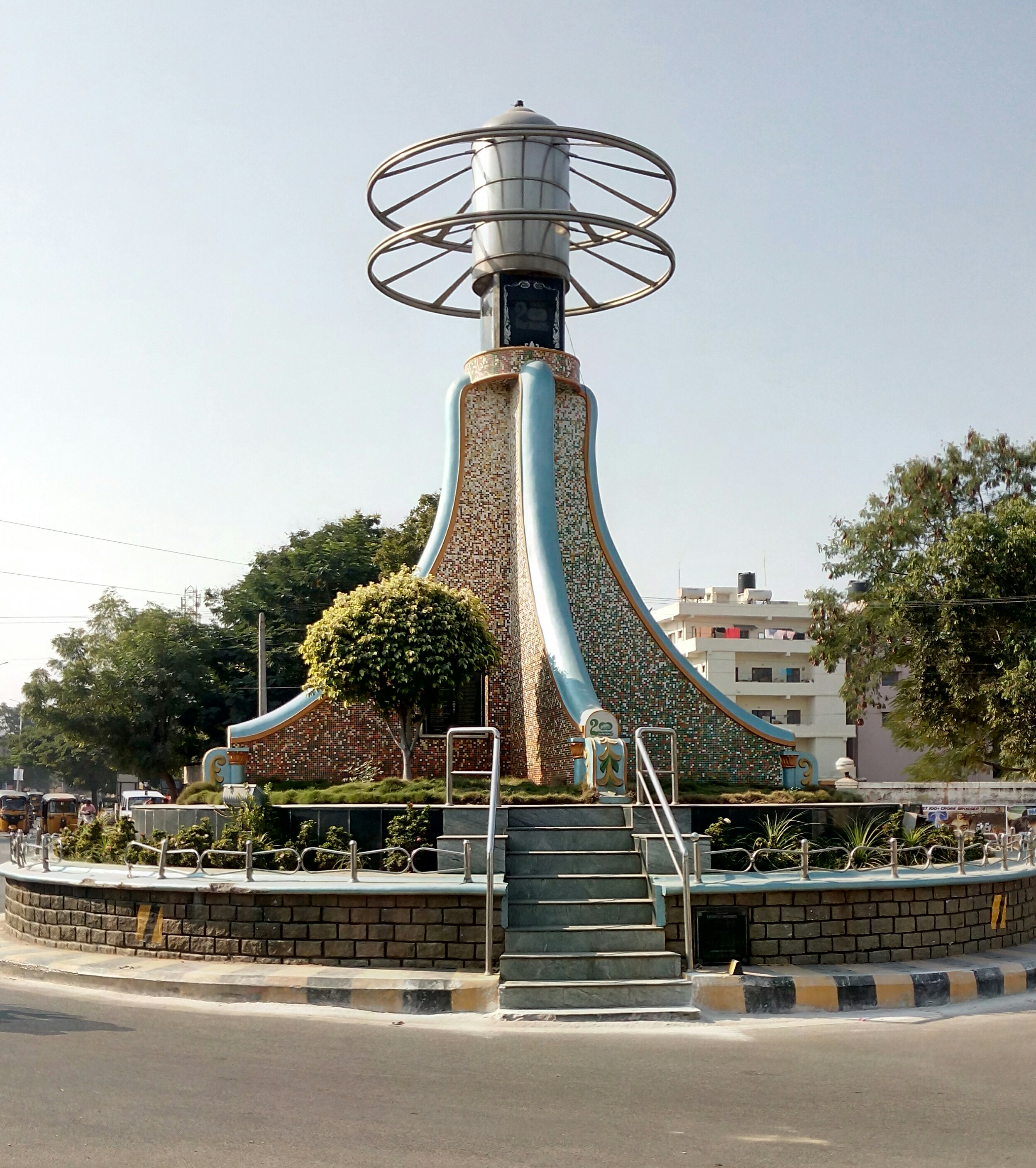
- Pylon commemorative of 200 years
- Interactive map of Kadapa
- Location within Andhra Pradesh Location within India
- Coordinates: 14°28′11.425″N 78°49′26.352″E
- Country: India
- State: Andhra Pradesh
- Region: Rayalaseema
- District: YSR Kadapa District
- Incorporated (Municipality): 1868
- Incorporated (Corporation): 2004

Government
  - Type: Municipal corporation
  - Body: Kadapa Municipal Corporation Annamayya Urban Development Authority (AUDA)
  - Mayor: Vacant (since 18 March 2026)
  - MLA: Reddeppagari Madhavi Reddy(TDP)
  - MP: Y. S. Avinash Reddy(YSRCP)

Area
  - City corporation: 164.08 km^{2} (63.35 sq mi)
- Elevation: 138 m (453 ft)

Population (2022)
  - City corporation: 466,000
  - Rank: 126th (India); 8th (Andhra Pradesh)
  - Density: 2,840/km^{2} (7,360/sq mi)
- Demonym: Kadapollu

Languages
  - Official: Telugu; Urdu
- Time zone: UTC+5:30 (IST)
- PIN: 516001,002,003,004,005,126
- Telephone code: 08562
- Vehicle registration: AP-39 (now), AP-04 (previous)
- Website: kmc.ap.gov.in

Kadapa is a city in the southern part of Andhra Pradesh, India. It is located in the Rayalaseema region, and is the district headquarters of YSR Kadapa district. It is located 8 kilometres (5.0 mi) south of the Penna River. The city is surrounded on three sides by the Nallamala and Palkonda Hills lying on the tectonic landscape between the Eastern and Western ghats. Black and red ferrous soils occupy the region. The city is nicknamed "Gadapa" ('threshold') since it is the gateway from the west to the hills of Tirumala.

Kadapa has been under different rulers in its history, including the Cholas, the Vijayanagara Empire and the Kingdom of Mysore.

== Etymology ==
The city's name originated from the Telugu word "Gadapa" meaning threshold or gate. It acquired this name with its relation to the Venkateswara Temple, Tirumala; one had to pass through this city in the olden days to reach Venkateswara Temple, Tirumala. In Telugu, the word Gadapa means a threshold and over time, the name evolved into Kadapa. It was spelled "Cuddapah" for several since the British times but was changed to "Kadapa" on 19 August 2005 to align with authentic native pronunciation. Other inscriptions showed the town to be named Hiranyanagaram as well as other official records that show it was also called Nekanamabad.

== History ==
=== Post classical era (200–800 AD) ===
The history of Kadapa dates back to the second century BC. The evidences of Archaeological Survey of India suggest that it started with Mourya and Satavahana dynasty. And since then it has been under the rule of numerous dynasties including Chalukya, Cholas and Pallava. Among all of these dynasties, first one to rule over Kadapa was Pallava dynasty. Pallava kings ruled over the city during the fifth century after penetrating into North of Kadapa. After that Cholas ruled till the eighth century after defeating Pallavas. Later Banas ruled over Kadapa.

=== Era (8th to 18th centuries AD) ===
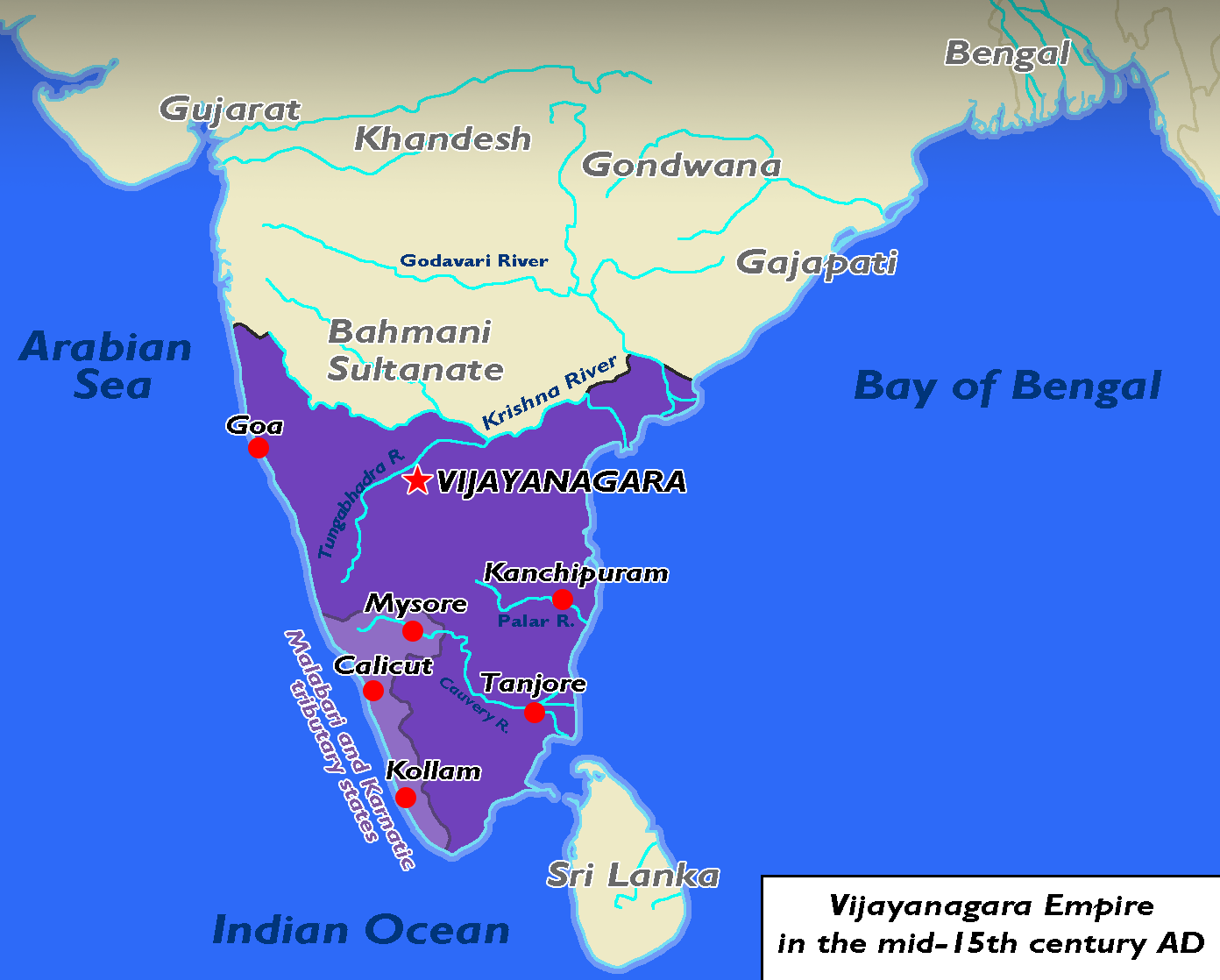
Ancient Kadapa region part of Vijayanagara Empire ruled between 1336 - 1646

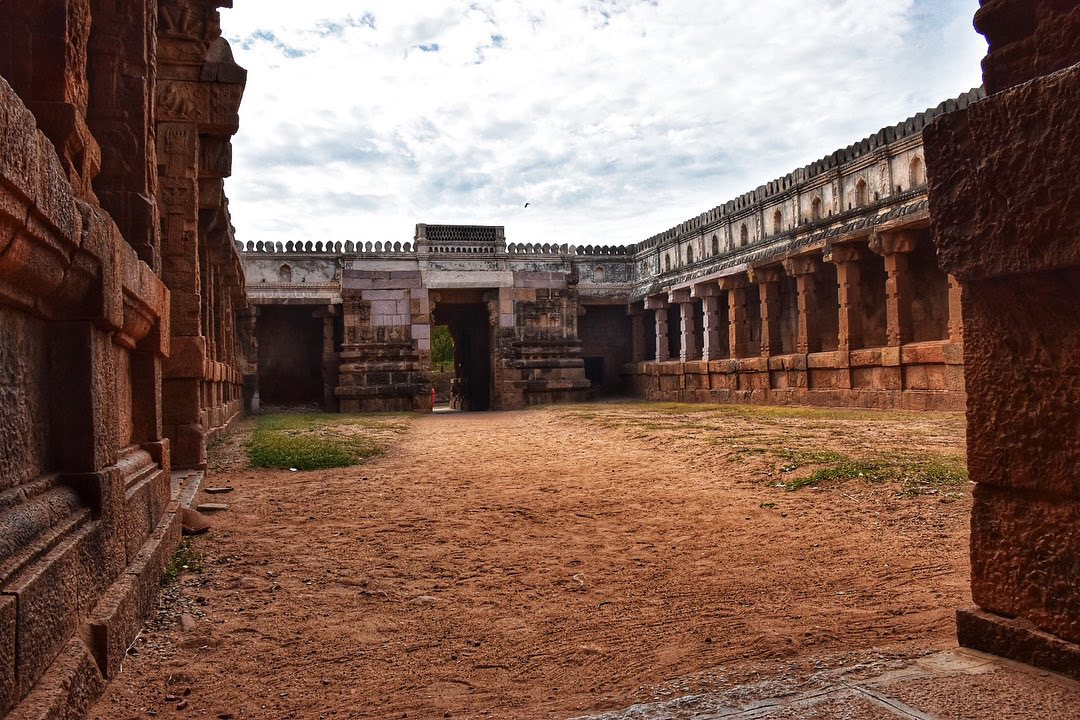
Siddhout fort near Kadapa

After Banas, Rashtrakutas ruled Kadapa region Among the popular rulers of Kadapa was King Indra III, who served during the period of 915 AD. In his period, Kadapa gained a lot of power and influence, which declined with his death later. Telugu Cholas, were the next one to rule Kadapa. Ambadeva ruled Kadapa in the latter half of the 13th century when he established the capital at Vallur, which is located at a distance of about 15 km from Kadapa.

After the death of Ambadeva, the Kakatiya king Prataparudra II ruled until the early 14th century. Prataparudra was defeated by Muslims in the reign of Khalji emperor Alla Uddin. Later in the mid-14th century, Hindus of Vijayanagar dynasty drove the Muslims out of Warangal and subsequently Kadapa and ruled for around two centuries till they were defeated by the Gulbarga sultans. The most illustrious ruler during this time was Pemmasani Thimma Nayudu (1422 CE) who developed the region and constructed many tanks and temples here. Muslims of Golkonda conquered the region in 1594 when Mir Jumla II raided Gandikota fort and defeated Chinna Thimma Nayudu by treachery. Marathas took over the city in 1740 after defeating the Nawab of Kurnool and Cuddapah.

Hyder Ali and Tipu Sultan also ruled the city (1784–1792) before it fell in the hands of Nizam by the Treaty of Seringapatam in 1792. Tipu's grandmother, Hyder Ali’s mother Fatima Fakhr-un-Nisa was the daughter of Mir Muin-ud-Din, the governor of the fort of Kadapa.

Later the British took control of Kadapa District in 1800 CE. Although the town is an ancient one, it was probably extended by dilazak Neknam Khan, the Qutb Shahi commander, who called the extension as "Neknamabad". The name "Neknamabad" was used for the town for some time but slowly fell into disuse and the records of the 18th century refer to the rulers not as "Nawab of Kadapa". Except for some years in the beginning, Kadapa District was the seat of the Mayana Nawabs in the 18th century. With the British occupation of the tract in 1800 CE, it became the headquarters of one of the four subordinate collectorates under the principal collector Sir Thomas Munro. In 2004, Kadapa was recognised as a municipal corporation.

== Geography ==
=== Topography ===
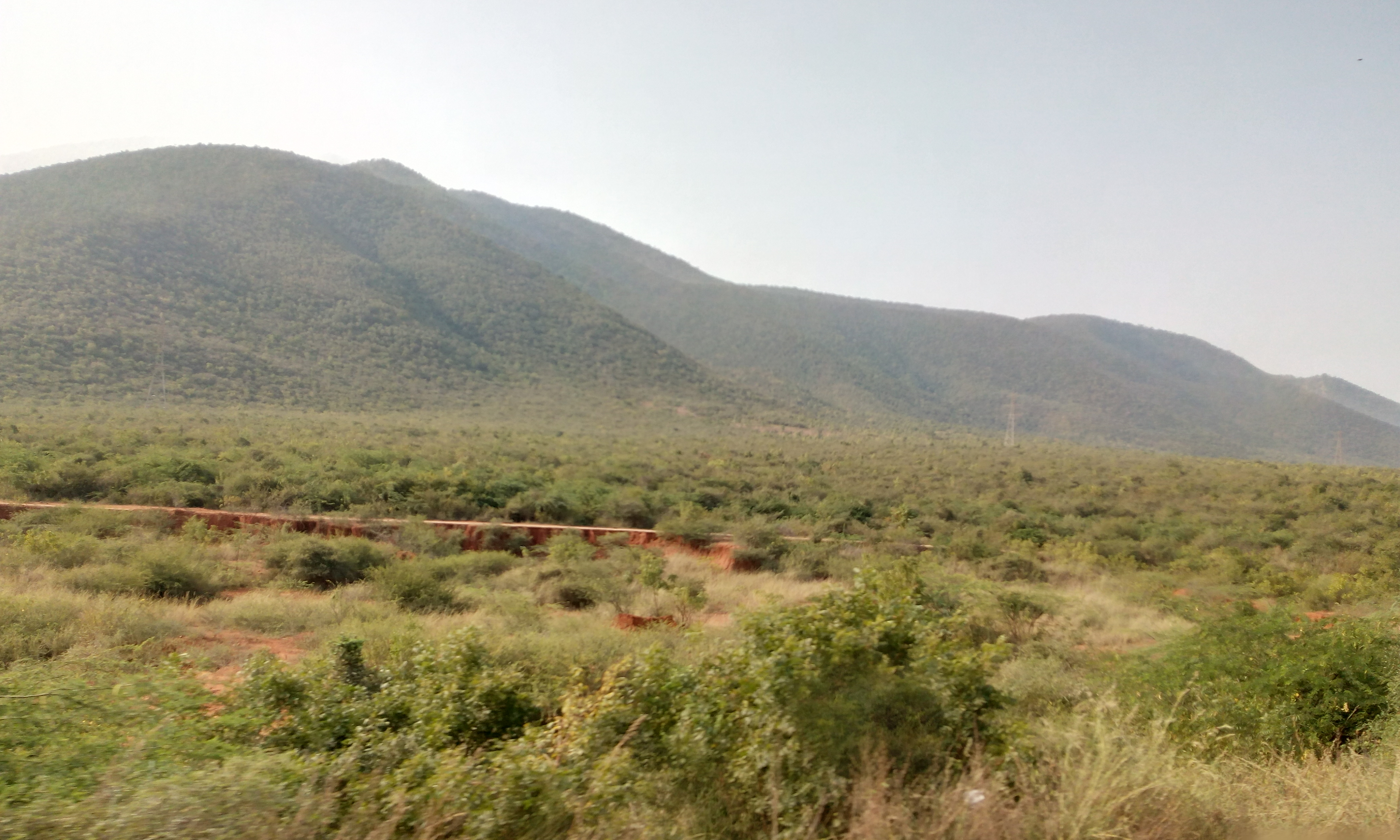
Palkonda Hills near Kadapa

Kadapa in the Rayalaseema region of Andhra Pradesh is located at 14.47°N 78.82°E about 250 km from Bangalore, 260 km from Chennai, 360 km from Vijayawada and 410 km from Hyderabad. The city is situated in the Bugga vanka or Ralla Vanka rivers bordered by the Palakondas to the south and to the east by a patch of hills casting north for the Lankamalas on Penna's other side. It has an average elevation of 138 metres (452 ft). Veligonda hills separates the districts of Nellore and Kadapa.

=== Climate ===
Kadapa has a hot semi-arid (Köppen BSh) climate characterised by year round high temperatures. It has a record of reaching 45 degree Celsius. Summers are especially uncomfortable with hot and humid conditions. During this time temperatures range from a minimum of 25 °C or 77.0 °F and can rise up to a maximum of 45 °C or 113.0 °F. Humidity is around 75% during the summer months. The monsoon season brings substantial rain to the area, and Kadapa gets some rainfall from both the southwest monsoon and the northeast monsoon. About 615 millimetres or 24.2 inches of the average total annual rainfall of around 770 millimetres or 30.3 inches occurs between June and October. Winters are comparatively milder and the temperatures are lower after the onset of the monsoons. During this time the temperatures range from a minimum of 17 °C or 63 °F and can rise up to a maximum of 32 °C or 90 °F. Humidity is much lower during the winter season, which is the best time to visit the area.

Climate data for Kadapa (1991–2020, extremes 1901–present)
Month	Jan	Feb	Mar	Apr	May	Jun	Jul	Aug	Sep	Oct	Nov	Dec	Year
Record high °C (°F)	37.8 (100.0)	41.5 (106.7)	43.5 (110.3)	45.3 (113.5)	46.2 (115.2)	45.7 (114.3)	40.6 (105.1)	40.0 (104.0)	39.8 (103.6)	39.5 (103.1)	36.5 (97.7)	35.6 (96.1)	46.2 (115.2)
Mean daily maximum °C (°F)	32.3 (90.1)	35.2 (95.4)	38.8 (101.8)	40.8 (105.4)	40.5 (104.9)	37.3 (99.1)	34.9 (94.8)	33.7 (92.7)	33.4 (92.1)	32.4 (90.3)	31.2 (88.2)	30.5 (86.9)	35.1 (95.2)
Mean daily minimum °C (°F)	18.6 (65.5)	20.4 (68.7)	23.9 (75.0)	26.9 (80.4)	27.7 (81.9)	26.6 (79.9)	25.4 (77.7)	25.0 (77.0)	24.5 (76.1)	23.8 (74.8)	21.1 (70.0)	18.5 (65.3)	23.5 (74.3)
Record low °C (°F)	10.0 (50.0)	12.0 (53.6)	12.6 (54.7)	17.2 (63.0)	18.0 (64.4)	17.6 (63.7)	16.2 (61.2)	16.0 (60.8)	14.6 (58.3)	16.0 (60.8)	13.8 (56.8)	10.6 (51.1)	10.0 (50.0)
Average rainfall mm (inches)	0.6 (0.02)	0.4 (0.02)	6.7 (0.26)	16.3 (0.64)	47.6 (1.87)	78.5 (3.09)	109.8 (4.32)	115.2 (4.54)	153.4 (6.04)	147.4 (5.80)	64.2 (2.53)	18.5 (0.73)	758.7 (29.87)
Average rainy days	0.1	0.1	0.5	1.0	2.2	4.2	6.2	6.5	6.9	6.7	4.0	1.3	39.8
Average relative humidity (%) (at 17:30 IST)	52	43	33	31	35	46	52	56	58	64	66	61	50
Source: India Meteorological Department

Kadapa has been ranked 23rd best “National Clean Air City” under (Category 2 3-10L Population cities) in India.

== Demographics ==
Historical population
Year	Pop.	±%
1871	16,307	—
1891	18,307	+12.3%
1901	16,432	−10.2%
1911	17,807	+8.4%
1961	49,027	+175.3%
1971	66,195	+35.0%
1981	103,125	+55.8%
1991	121,463	+17.8%
2001	287,093	+136.4%
2011	344,893	+20.1%

Religion in Kadapa (2011)
Hinduism	65.42%
Islam	31.65%
Christianity	1.81%
Other or not stated	1.12%

The population of Kadapa was first counted in 1871 during the first census of India, which was held until 1911 (pg 176). However, after no historical records are available until 1961. Kadapa is one of the largest and fastest developing cities in Andhra Pradesh. As per the 1991 census the population of the town was 1,21,463. It didn't increase much as per the 2001 census which recorded 1,26,505 lakhs for 20 wards population with an average decadal growth rate of 0.36 per cent. Later it was converted to a Municipal Corporation in 2005. As per provisional data of 2011 census, Kadapa urban agglomeration has a population of 344,078, out of which males are 172,969 and females are 171,109. The literacy rate is 79.34 per cent. The religious population has 65% Hindus, 32% Muslims and 2% Christians.

=== Languages ===
Languages of Kadapa (2011)
1. Telugu (67.4%)
2. Urdu (31.0%)
3. Others (1.59%)

At the time of the 2011 census, 67.37% of the population spoke Telugu and 31.04% Urdu as their first language.

== Administration ==
=== Local government ===
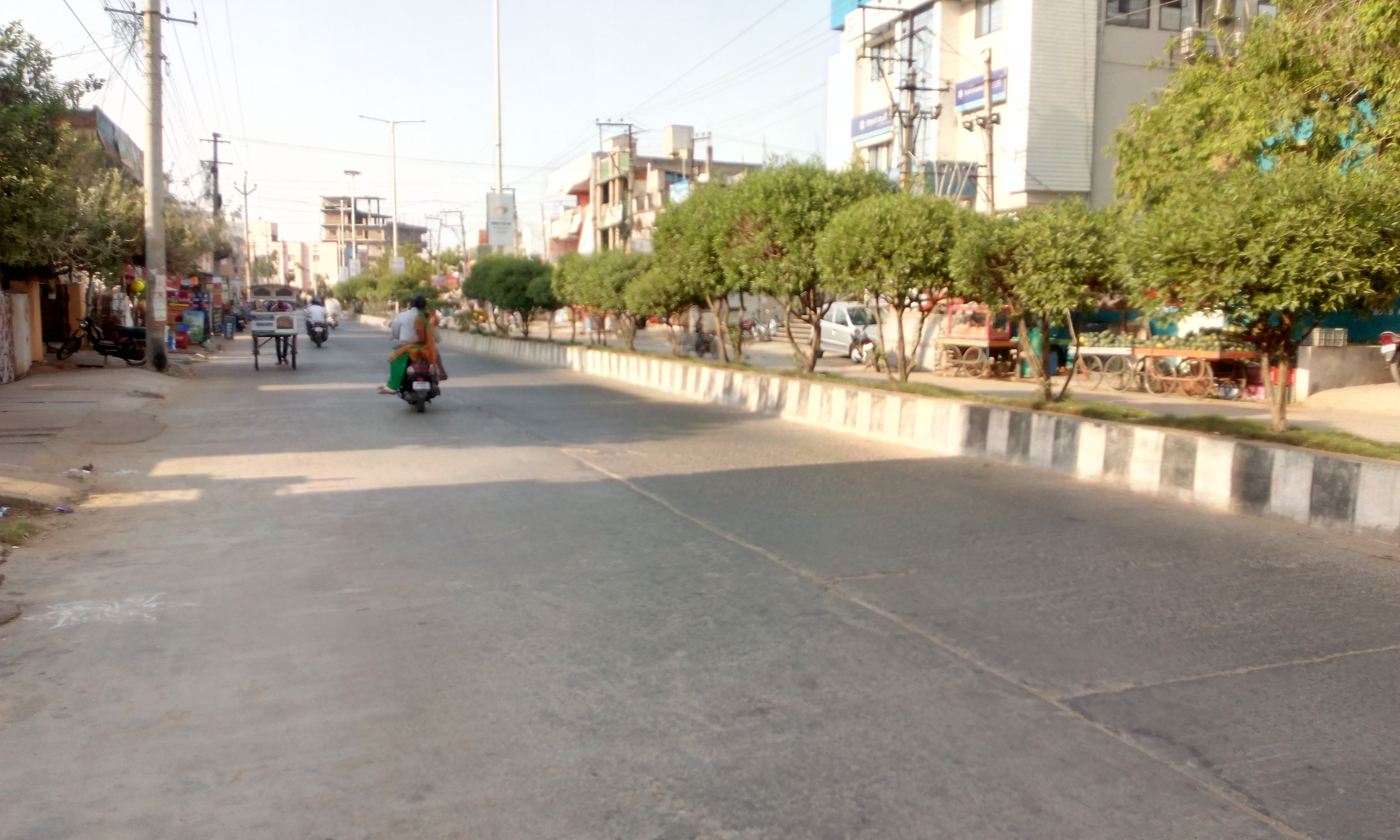
A 4 Lane Service road, NGO Colony Kadapa

Kadapa's municipal administration was established in 1868 with the constitution of a III-Grade Municipality. The municipality was subsequently upgraded to II-Grade status in 1958 and attained Special Grade status in 1980. In 2004, it was elevated to the status of the Kadapa Municipal Corporation, marking a significant expansion in its administrative responsibilities and urban governance. The corporation administers an area of 164.08 square kilometres.

The Kadapa Municipal Corporation oversees the civic needs of the city and was constituted in the year 2005. It has 50 municipal wards represented by a corporator through direct election, who in turn elects the Mayor.

=== Administrative zones of Kadapa Municipal Corporation ===
Zone	Wards	Area (km²)	Population	Ward numbers
East	14	22.747	94,349	2, 3, 4, 5, 6, 7, 8, 9, 10, 11, 12, 25, 26, 27
West	11	35.81	82,829	40, 41, 42, 43, 44, 45, 46, 47, 48, 49, 50
North	13	23.028	85,769	1, 28, 29, 30, 31, 32, 33, 34, 35, 36, 37, 38, 39
South	12	82.495	81,943	13, 14, 15, 16, 17, 18, 19, 20, 21, 22, 23, 24
Total	50	164.08	344,890	—

The administrative functions of the Kadapa Municipal Corporation are headed by the Municipal Commissioner, Kum. H. S. Bhavana, IAS (FAC). The Commissioner is assisted by the Deputy Commissioner, Sri P. Srinivasa Rao, in the administration of the corporation. The elected wing is headed by the Mayor, Sri Kothamaddi Suresh Babu. The corporation has two Deputy Mayors, Sayed Munthaj Begum and Nithyanandha Reddy Bandi, who assist the Mayor in the functioning of the elected body.

The Kadapa Municipal Corporation functions through several administrative departments that oversee civic administration and the delivery of municipal services. These include the General Administration, Engineering, Public Health, Revenue, Town Planning, Sachivalayams, UCD, Horticulture, Education, Finance and IT Governance departments, each responsible for specific aspects of the corporation's administration and public services.

The Kadapa District Court is located in Kadapa.

== Culture ==
The city has rich culture and heritage with the influence of different dynasties. There are different rituals, customs and traditions with the existence of different religions such as, Hinduism, Islam, Christianity, Buddhism and Jainism. The city is known for its historic Devuni Kadapa and Ameen Peer Dargah.

=== Arts and crafts ===
Shilparamam is a crafts village situated in the outskirts of Kadapa.

=== Cuisine ===
Kadapa is well known for its spicy food which is very similar to South Indian cuisine as a whole. Karam dosa is very popular in Kadapa. dosa, idly, sambar and chutney are usually served during breakfast. Rice, daal and curry is usually served as lunch. Most restaurants serve South Indian thali including these dishes in their lunch and dinner menu. Although the town has a South Indian touch in its dishes it also has a diverse variety of its own which include ragi sangati, boti curry, natukodi chicken, paya curry, etc. Ragi sangati with chicken curry is the staple food in Kadapa and is also one of the most famous dishes in the city. Many other varieties of dishes can also be found in the local restaurants. Like many other cities of India fast food is also increasing its reach in the city.

== Economy ==
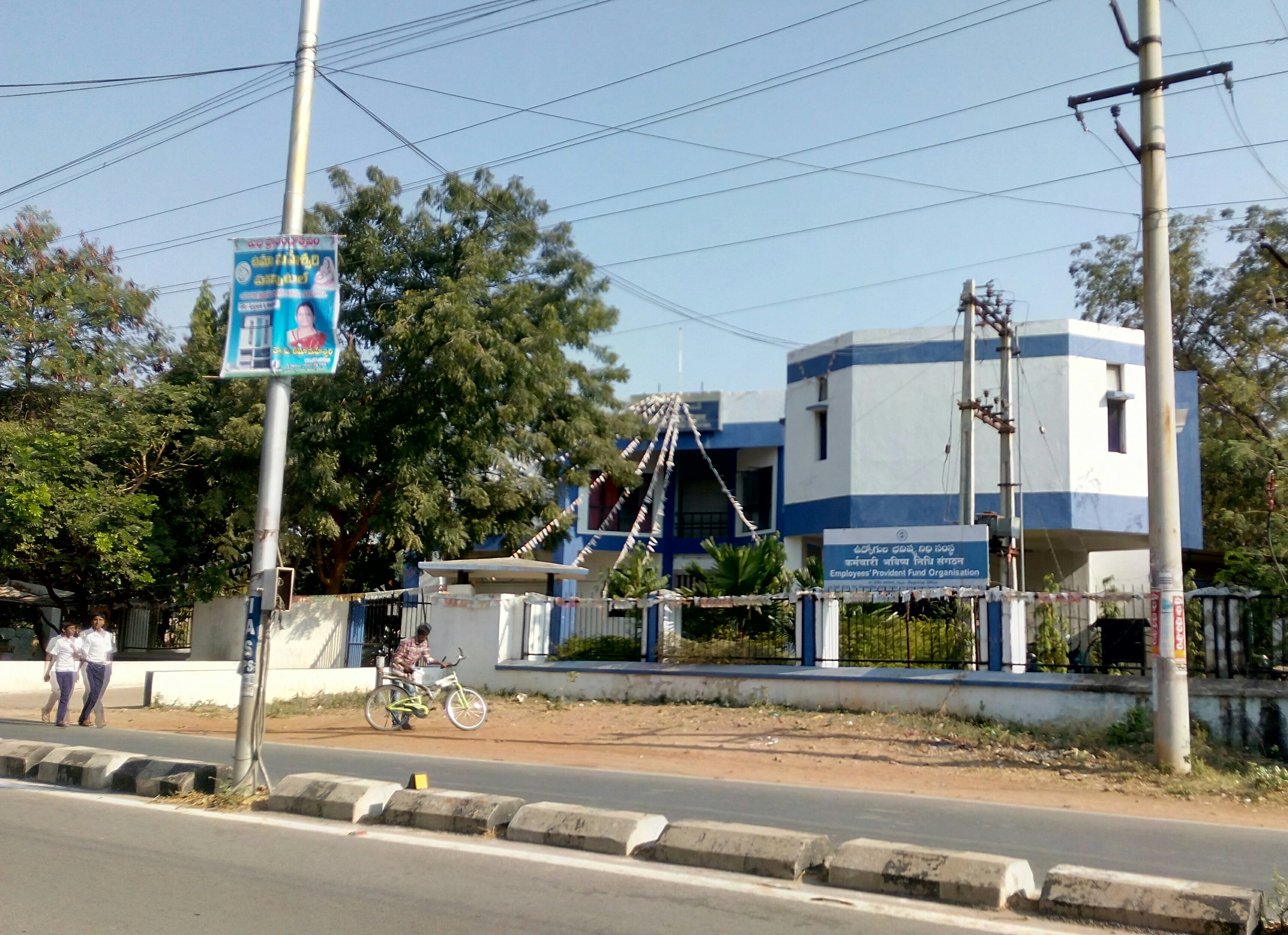
Employees' Provident Fund Organisation, Kadapa

As of 2020, the GDP of Kadapa city was $2.038 billion.

The economy of the city is largely based on agriculture crops like ground nut, cotton, red gram, Bengal gram are grown here and mining. Being a district headquarters all types of government departments are situated within the city. For most of the families the source of income is through the government jobs and private sector jobs in various departments including shops, hospitality industry, and marketing. Tourism also forms a part of the city's economy. Kadapa is one of the 49 metropolitan clusters selected by McKinsey & Company as growth hotspots in India.

== Education ==
The primary and secondary school education is imparted by government, aided and private schools of the School Education Department of the state.

=== Institutions ===
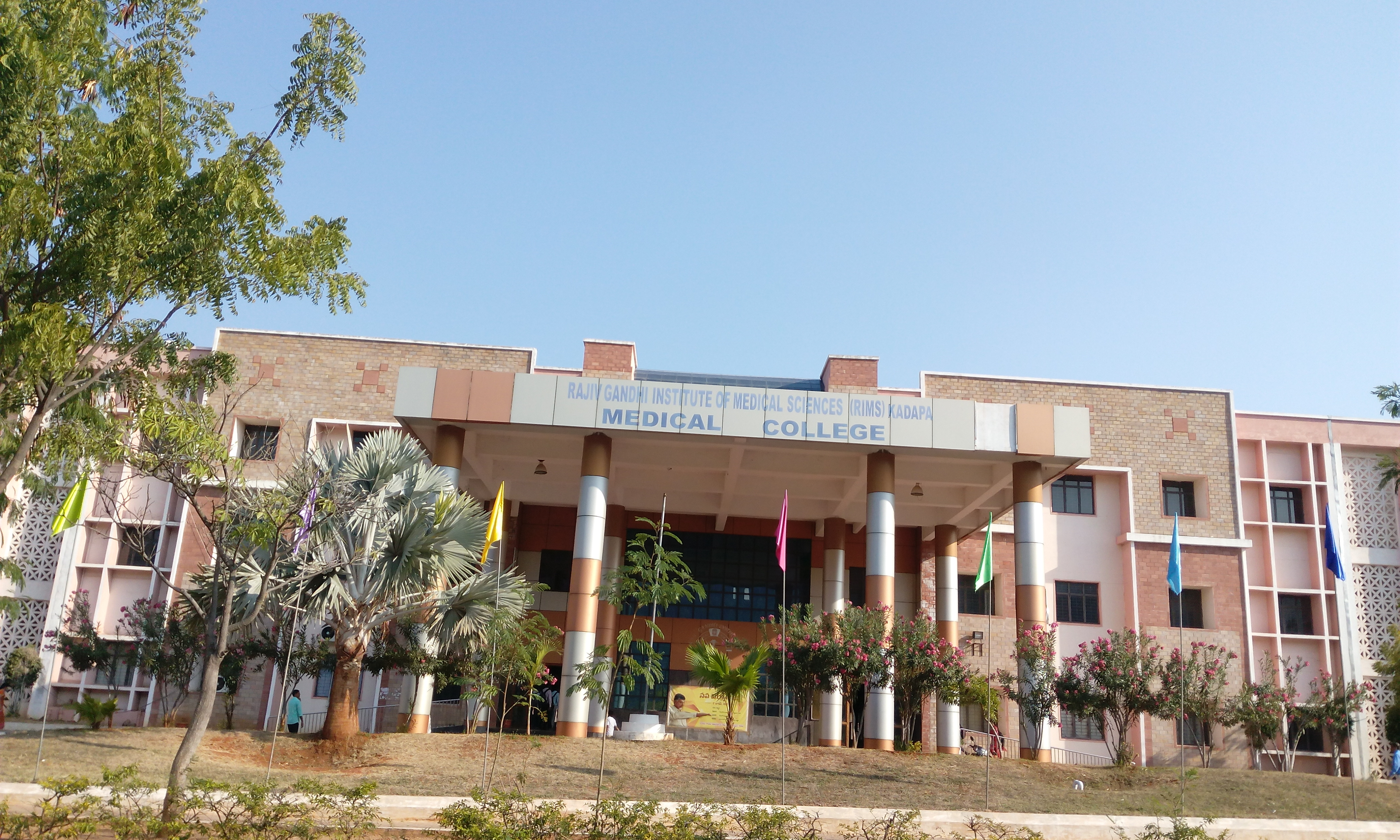
RIMS Medical College entrance

- Rajiv Gandhi Institute of Medical Sciences, Kadapa
- KSRM College of Engineering
- Yogi Vemana University
- Fatima Institute of Medical Sciences

== Transport ==
Kadapa City is well connected by road, rail and air.

=== Roadways ===
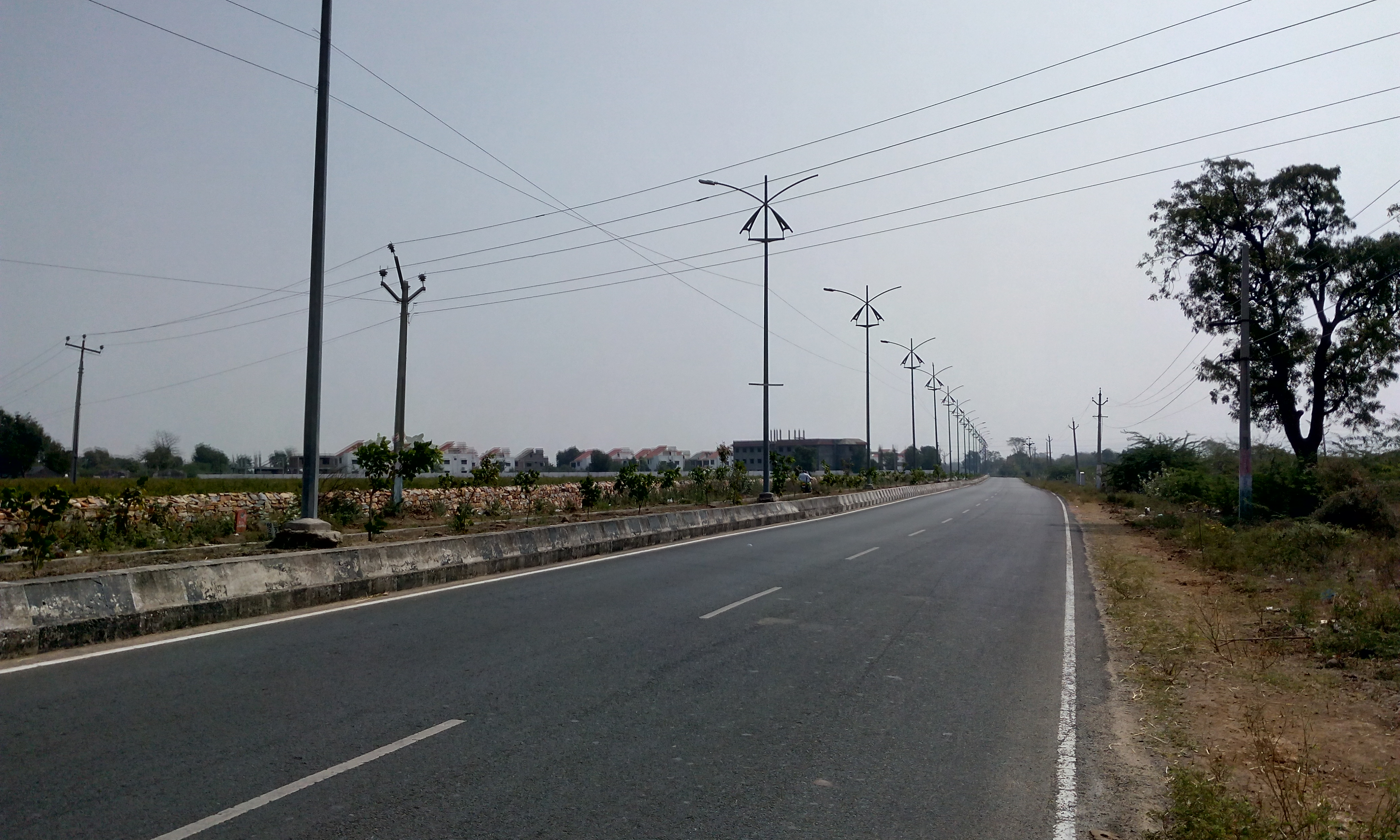
Pulivendula-Kadapa 4 lane road near Pulivendula

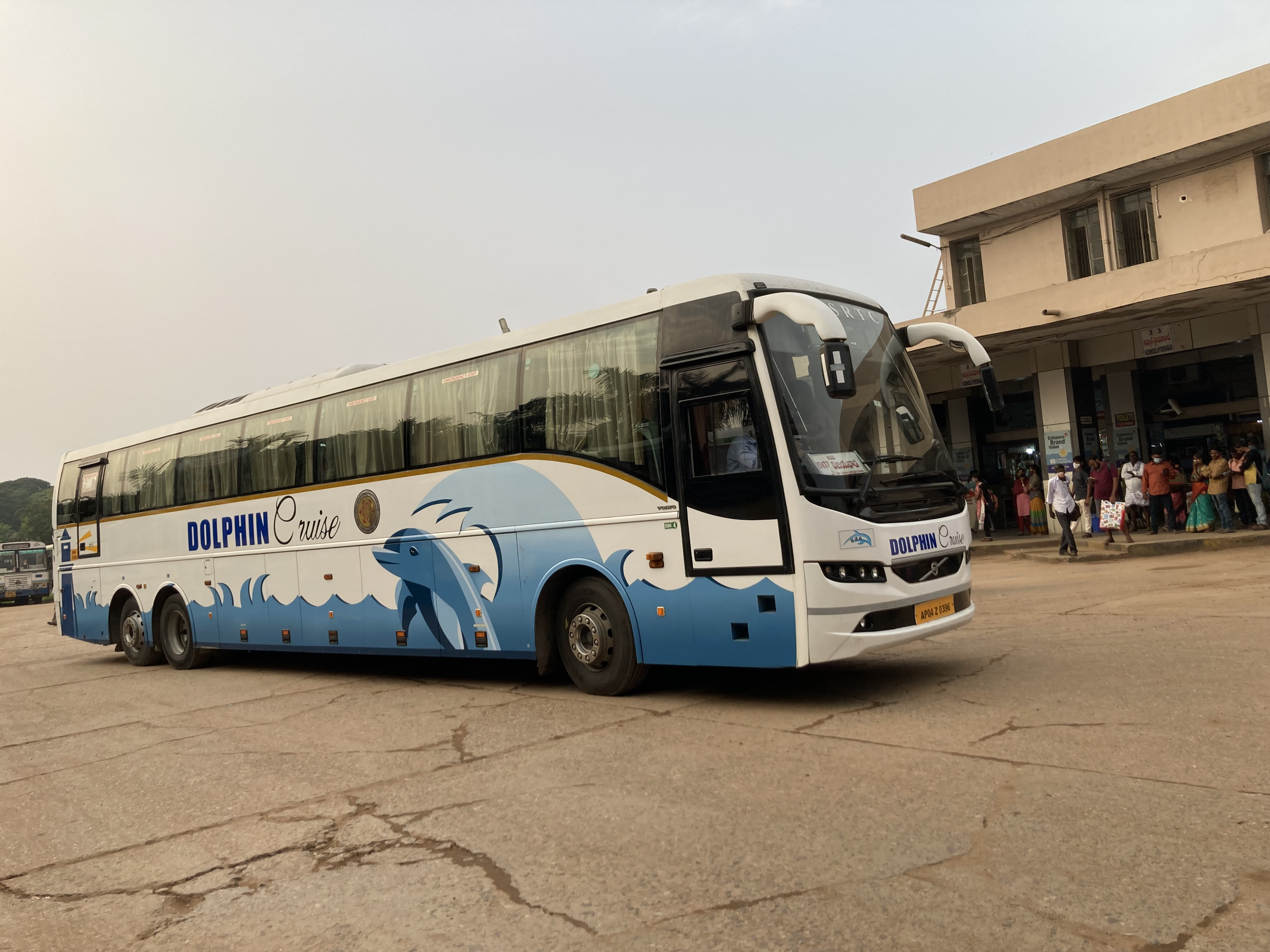
Kadapa bus station view

Kadapa has good road connectivity to the other major cities like Tirupati, Bangalore, Chennai, Visakhapatnam, Vijayawada, Rajahmundry, Kakinada, Nellore, Kurnool, Anantapur. APSRTC provides bus services to various destinations of the Kadapa district and other cities across South India. The city has a total road length of 803.84 km.

=== Railways ===
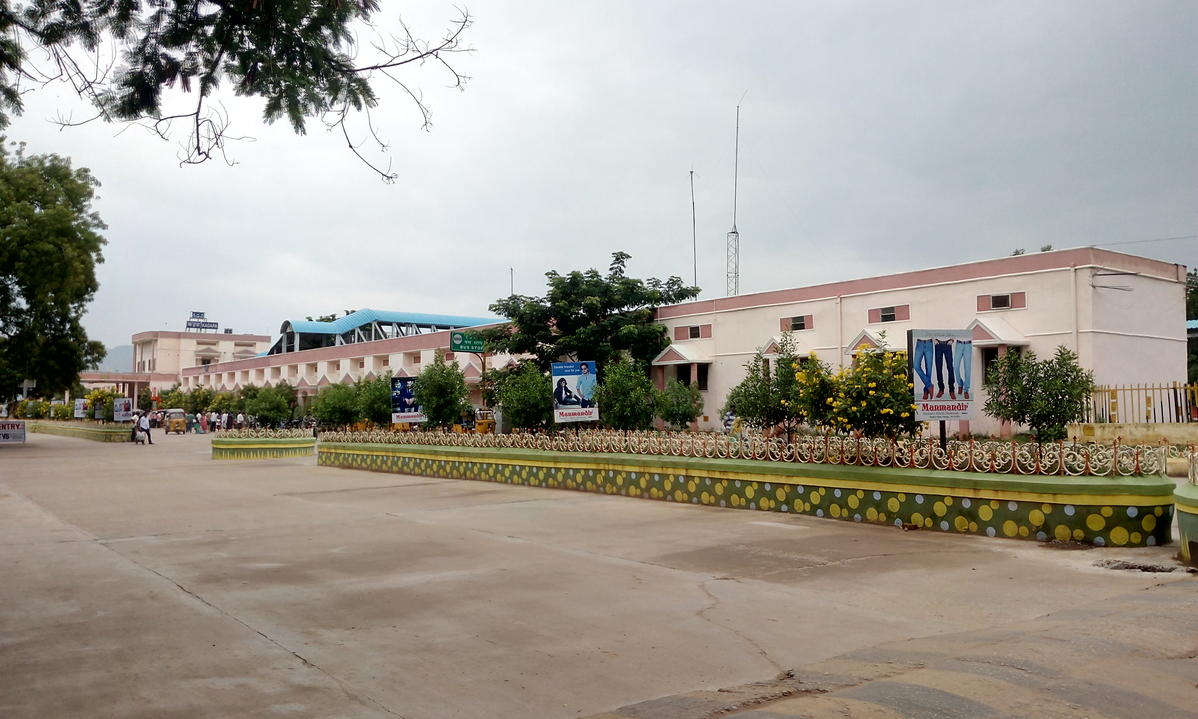
Long view of station building

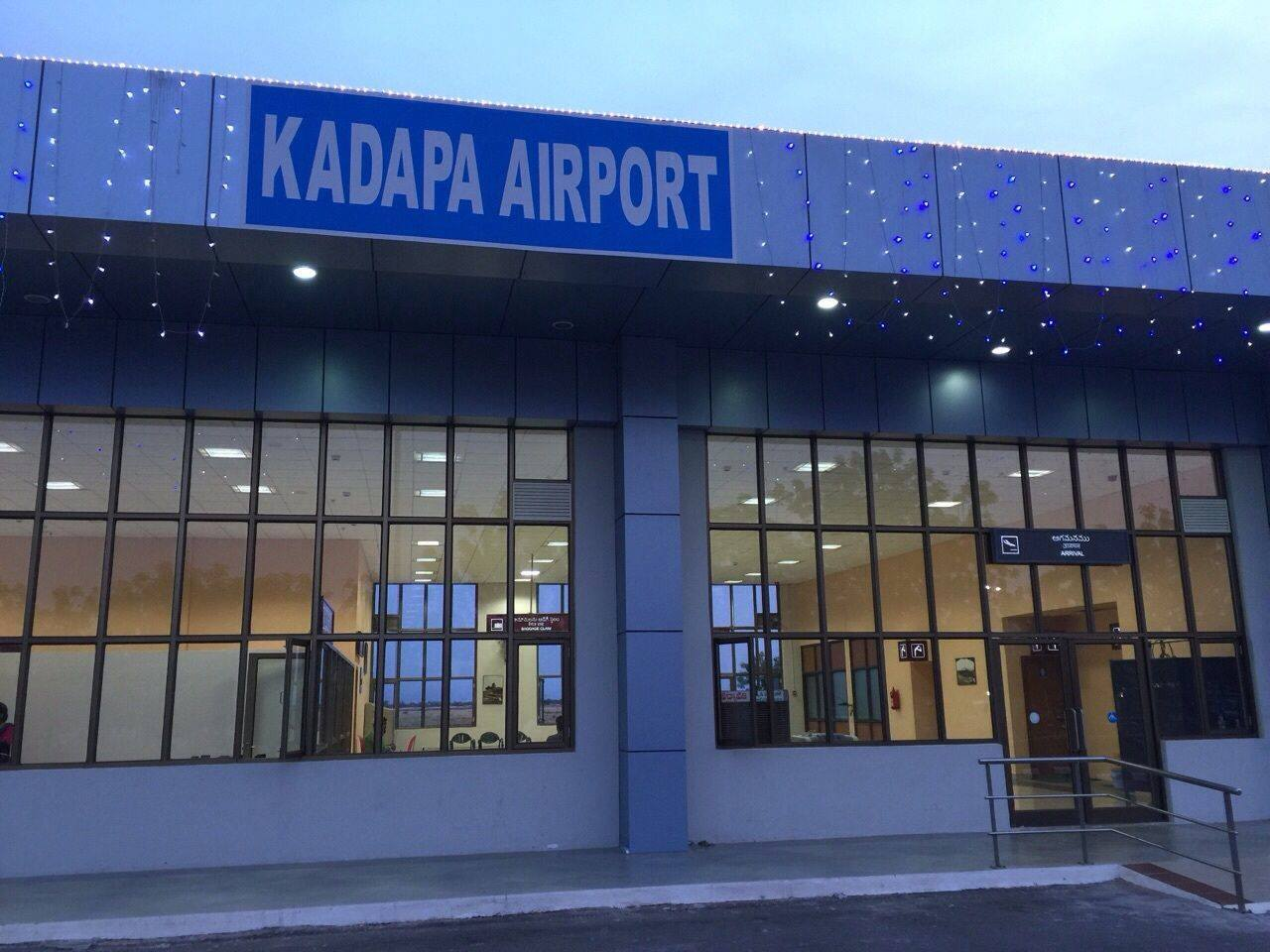
Kadapa Airport terminal

Kadapa has its own railway station in the city. It is one of the oldest railway stations in the state and opened around 1866. The Mumbai–Chennai line, one of the busiest lines in the south coast region, passes through Kadapa railway station. It is one of the A category railway stations in South Coast Railway zone under Guntakal railway division. A new railway line Kadapa–Bangalore section is under construction. As of August 2021, there is no direct train to Bengaluru from Kadapa, although occasional special trains and diverted trains do connect them. Kadapa is well connected by road so bus services are widely used.

=== Airways ===
Kadapa Airport was opened for air traffic on 7 June 2015. It is located at a distance of 12 km north west of the city.

Airlines and destinations – Kadapa Airport
Airlines	Destinations
Indigo	Bangalore, Chennai, Hyderabad, Vijayawada, Visakhapatnam

== See also ==
- List of urban agglomerations in Andhra Pradesh
- List of municipal corporations in Andhra Pradesh
