= 2014 Andhra Pradesh urban local bodies elections =

Elections in the Indian state

2014 Andhra Pradesh urban local body elections
- 30 March 2014

10 municipal corporations; 14 municipalities

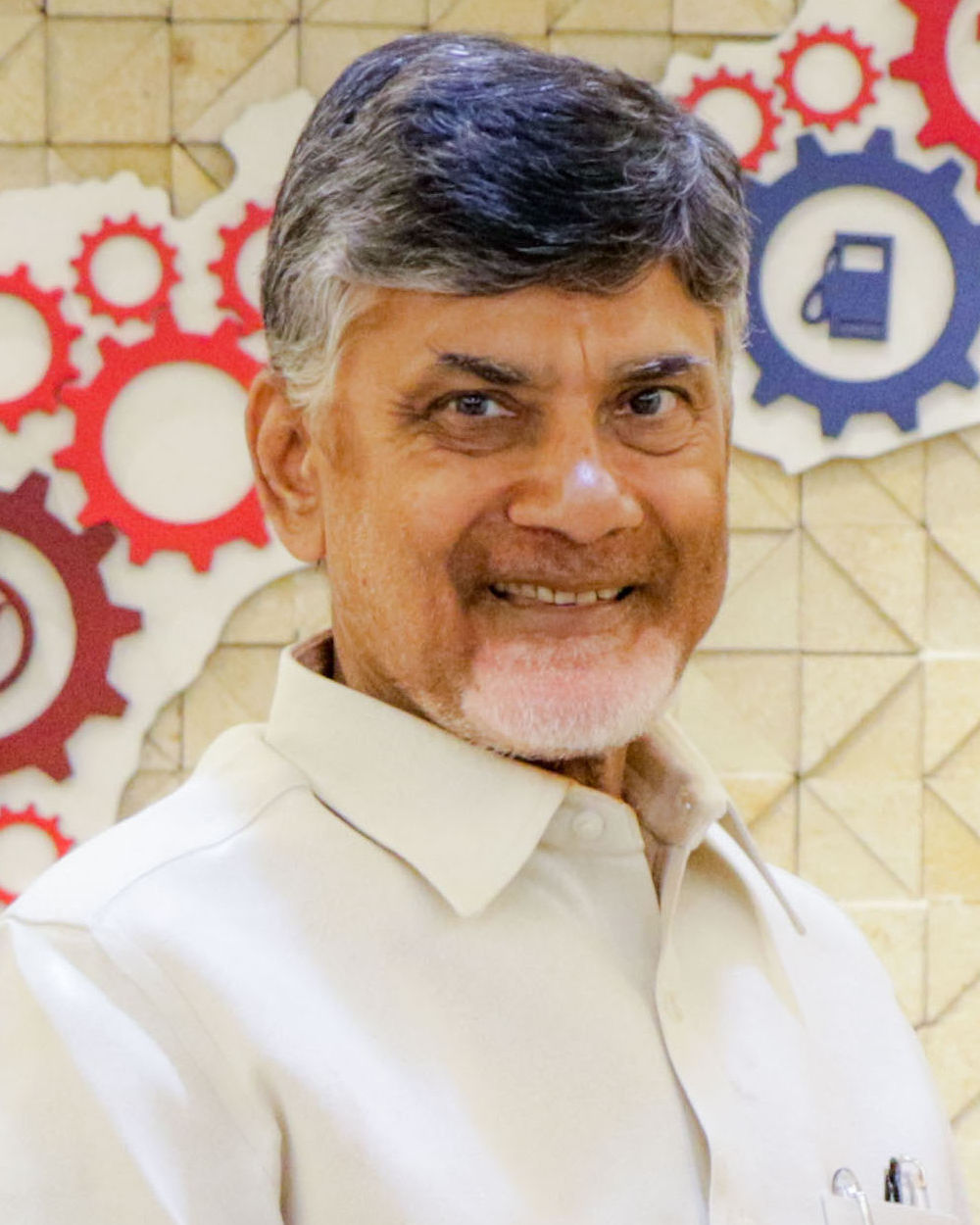

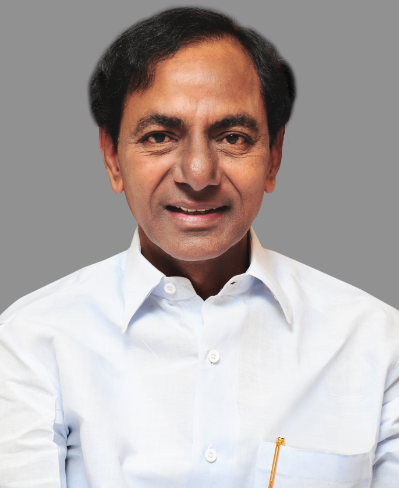

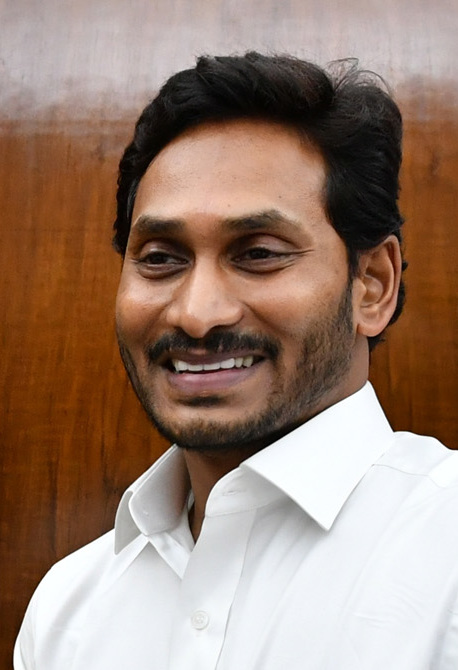
	First party	Second party	Third party
Leader	Raghu Veera Reddy-Ponnala Lakshmaiah	N. Chandrababu Naidu	K. Chandrashekar Rao
Party	INC	TDP	TRS
Councillors	601 (Note: INC won 2 divisions and 51 wards across Seemandhra, and 48 divisions and 500 wards in Telangana.)	1,754 (Note: TDP won 153 divisions and 1,444 wards across Seemandhra, and 157 wards in Telangana.)	354 (Note: TRS won 49 divisions and 305 wards in Telangana.)
Councillors ±	TBC	TBC	TBC
ULBs	23	75	11
ULBs ±	TBC	TBC	TBC
Mayors	23	79	22
Mayors ±	TBC	TBC	TBC
	Fourth party
Leader	Y. S. Jagan Mohan Reddy
Party	YSRCP
Councillors	1,021 (Note: YSRCP won 121 divisions and 900 wards in Seemandhra.)
Councillors ±	TBC
ULBs	22
ULBs ±	TBC
Mayors	20
Mayors ±	TBC

The state of Andhra Pradesh held urban local bodies elections on 30 March 2014. This included 10 Municipal Corporations, and 145 Municipal Councils and Nagar Panchayats (Notified Area Council). Elections in the remaining bodies were not held due to issues such as court cases, delays in the preparation of electoral rolls, problems in the delimitation of wards, and the creation of new bodies.

== Background ==
On 3 February, the High Court criticized the government for not conducting the local bodies' elections despite clear directions to do so. The Court threatened to take action against the Chief Secretary of the state if they failed to comply with the orders. Despite going to the Supreme Court, the government received no respite. On 3 March, the State Election Commissioner announced that the elections would not receive the Governor's permission, due to the President's rule in the state.

These were the last local body elections in the soon-to-be bifurcated state.

=== Election schedule ===
Event	Date
Date for Nominations	10 March 2014
Last Date for filing Nominations	13 for M.Corp, 14 for M.Council March 2014
Date for scrutiny of nominations	15 March 2014
Date for commencement of withdrawal of candidature	
Last date for withdrawal of candidatures and publication of contesting candidates	18 March 2014
Date of poll	30 March 2014
Date of re-poll, if any	
Date of counting	12 May 2014
Date before which the election shall be completed	

== Election results ==
Initially, the results were to be declared on 2 April. However, due to concern from certain political parties that the results could influence voters in the coming assembly and parliamentary elections, they were postponed until 12 May.

=== Party Wise Results ===
==== Results in Andhra Pradesh ====
Direct elections

S.No.	Party	Symbol	M.Corp	M.Councils/ Nagar Panchayats	Total
1.	Indian National Congress		0	0	0
2.	Telugu Desam Party		5	65	70
3.	YSR Congress Party		2	20	22
4.	Communist Party of India		0	0	0
5.	Independent		0	0	0
6.	AAP		0	7	7
Total			7	92	99

Indirect elections to mayor

S.No.	Party	Symbol	M.Corp	M.Councils/ Nagar Panchayats	Total
1.	Indian National Congress		0	1	1
2.	Telugu Desam Party		5	70	75
3.	YSR Congress Party		2	18	20
4.	Communist Party of India			1	1
5.	Independent			2	2
Total			7	92	99

==== Results in Telangana ====
Direct elections

S.No.	Party	Symbol	M.Corp	M.Councils/ Nagar Panchayats	Total
1.	Indian National Congress		0	23	23
2.	Telangana Rashtra Samithi		0	11	11
3.	Telugu Desam Party		0	5	5
4.	Bharatiya Janata Party		0	5	5
5.	All India Majlis-e-Ittehadul Muslimeen		0	1	1
6.	Bahujan Samaj Party		0	1	1
7.	Hung		3	12	15
Total			3	53	56

Indirect elections to mayor

S.No.	Party	Symbol	M.Corp	M.Councils/ Nagar Panchayats	Total
1.	Indian National Congress		0	22	22
2.	Telugu Desam Party		0	4	4
3.	Telangana Rashtra Samithi		2	20	22
4.	Bharatiya Janata Party		0	3	3
5.	All India Majlis-e-Ittehadul Muslimeen		0	1	1
6.	Independent		1	3	4
Total			3	53	56

== See also ==
- 2016 Telangana urban local bodies elections
- 2021 Andhra Pradesh urban local bodies elections
