= Khammam Municipal Corporation =

Local civic body in khammam, Telangana, India

Type
- Type: Municipal Corporation of the Khammam

Leadership
- Mayor: Punukollu neeraja, TRS
- Deputy Mayor: Smt. Fathima Johra, TRS
- Municipal Commissioner: Shri. Abhishek Augustya I.A.S

Website
- Khammam Municipal Corporation

The Khammam Municipal Corporation is a civic body of Khammam in the Indian state of Telangana. It was formed on 19 October 2012.

== History ==
The municipality of Khammam was constituted as a III–Grade in the year 1952. It was then upgraded to II–Grade in 1959, I–Grade in 1980 and then to Special Grade on 18 May 2001.

The first municipal mayor for Khammam municipal corporation is Shri. Guguloth Papalal.

The first woman mayor for Khammam Municipal Corporation is Smt. Punukollu Neeraja.

== Jurisdiction ==
The corporation is spread over an area of 94.37 km^{2} (36.44 sq mi) with 51 election wards. Fourteen villages were merged into the corporation. The merged villages include, Ballepalli, Dwamsalapuram, Edulapuram, Gollagudem, Gudimalla, Gurralapadu, Kaikondaigudem, Khanapuram Haveli, Mallemadugu and Peddathanda, Polepalli, Velugumatla and Venkatagiri.

== Administration ==
The corporation is administered by an elected body, headed by a mayor. The corporation population as per the 2011 Census of India was 153,756. The present commissioner of the corporation is G. Venugopal Reddy.

== Elections ==
The first elections for Khammam Municipal Corporation has conducted on 6 March 2016. Around 68 percent of voters registered for the elections. A total of 291 candidates from TRS, TDP, Congress-CPI combine, CPI (M), YSR Congress, BJP and independents were in the fray for 50 divisions of the civic body. The city has 2,65,710 registered voters. Counting will be held on 9 March.
