= 2027 elections in India =

2027 Indian elections
- ← 2025 2026 2027 2028 2029 →

Rajya Sabha elections
- Seats contested: 4
- Net seat change: TBD

State elections
- States contested: 7

The 2027 elections in India are expected to include the elections of the Rajya Sabha, President of India, and 7 state legislative assemblies.

== Presidential election ==
Date	Before election		After election	
Date	President	Party	President	Party
July 2027	Droupadi Murmu	Bharatiya Janata Party	TBD	TBD

== Lok Sabha by-elections ==
Date	Constituency	State/UT	Previous MP	Party	Date of vacancy	Reason	Elected MP	Party
TBA	Shillong	Meghalaya	Ricky A. J. Syngkon	Voice of the People Party	19 Feb 2026	Death	TBD	
TBA	Basirhat	West Bengal	Haji Nurul Islam	Trinamool Congress	25 Sep 2024	Death	TBD	
TBA	Srinagar	Jammu and Kashmir	Aga Syed Ruhullah Mehdi	Jammu & Kashmir National Conference	3 Nov 2026	Resignation	TBD	

== State legislative assembly elections ==
Date	State	Incumbent		Elected		Maps
Date	State	Party	CM	Party	CM	Maps
February /March 2027	Punjab	Aam Aadmi Party	Bhagwant Singh Mann	TBD		
February /March 2027	Goa	Bharatiya Janata Party	Pramod Sawant	TBD		
February /March 2027	Manipur	Bharatiya Janata Party	Yumnam Khemchand Singh	TBD		
February /March 2027	Uttarakhand	Bharatiya Janata Party	Pushkar Singh Dhami	TBD		
February /March 2027	Uttar Pradesh	Bharatiya Janata Party	Yogi Adityanath	TBD		
November 2027	Himachal Pradesh	Indian National Congress	Sukhvinder Singh Sukhu	TBD		
December 2027	Gujarat	Bharatiya Janata Party	Bhupendrabhai Patel	TBD		

== State Assembly by-elections ==
State/UT	Date	Constituency		Previous MLA	Party	Date of vacancy	Reason	Elected MLA	Party
Chhattisgarh	TBD	67	Ahiwara	Domanlal Korsewada	BJP	30 Oct 2026	Death	TBD	
Himachal Pradesh	TBD	66	Rampur	Nand Lal	INC	3 Nov 2026	Death	TBD	
Jharkhand	TBD	32	Giridih	Sudivya Kumar	JMM	6 Sep 2026	Death	TBD	
Karnataka	TBD	100	Hiriyur	D. Sudhakar	INC	10 May 2026	Death	TBD	
Rajasthan	TBD	62	Behror	Jaswant Singh Yadav	BJP	8 Nov 2026	Death	TBD	
Tamil Nadu	TBD	13	Kolathur	V S Babu	TVK	19 Nov 2026	Death	TBD	
Tamil Nadu	TBD	103	Perundurai	S. Jayakumar	AIADMK	25 May 2026	Resignation	TBD	
Tamil Nadu	TBD	135	Karur	M. R. Vijayabhaskar	AIADMK	29 Jun 2026	Resignation	TBD	
Tamil Nadu	TBD	141	Tiruchirappalli East	C. Joseph Vijay	TVK	10 May 2026	Resignation	TBD	
Tamil Nadu	TBD	179	Viralimalai	C. Vijayabaskar	AIADMK	16 June 2026	Resignation	TBD	
Tamil Nadu	TBD	225	Ambasamudram	E. Subaya	AIADMK	26 May 2026	Resignation	TBD	
Telangana	TBD	60	Khairatabad	Danam Nagender	BRS	18 Sep 2026	Disqualified	TBD	

== Municipal Corporation elections ==
=== Assam ===
Date	Municipal Corporation	Government before	Government after
TBA	Guwahati	BJP	TBD
TBA	Dibrugarh	BJP	TBD

=== Chhattisgarh ===
Date	Municipal Corporation	Government before	Government after
TBD	Bhilai Charoda	INC	TBD
TBD	Bhilai	INC	TBD
TBD	Birgaon	INC	TBD
TBD	Risali	INC	TBD

=== Bihar ===
Date	Municipal Corporation	Government before	Government after
TBA	Patna	Non-partisan IND	TBD
TBA	Gaya	Non-partisan IND	TBD
TBA	Bhagalpur	Non-partisan IND	TBD
TBA	Muzaffarpur	Non-partisan IND	TBD
TBA	Bihar Sharif	Non-partisan IND	TBD
TBA	Darbhanga	Non-partisan IND	TBD
TBA	Purnia	Non-partisan IND	TBD
TBA	Arrah	Non-partisan IND	TBD
TBA	Begusarai	Non-partisan IND	TBD
TBA	Katihar	Non-partisan IND	TBD
TBA	Munger	Non-partisan IND	TBD
TBA	Samastipur	Non-partisan IND	TBD
TBA	Chhapra	Non-partisan IND	TBD
TBA	Saharsa	Non-partisan IND	TBD
TBA	Sasaram	Non-partisan IND	TBD
TBA	Madhubani	Non-partisan IND	TBD
TBA	Bettiah	Non-partisan IND	TBD
TBA	Motihari	Non-partisan IND	TBD
TBA	Sitamarhi	Non-partisan IND	TBD

=== Delhi ===
Date	Municipal Corporation	Government before	Government after
TBD	Delhi	BJP	TBD

=== Himachal Pradesh ===
Date	Municipal Corporation	Government before	Government after
TBD	Baddi	Newly formed	TBD
TBD	Hamirpur	Newly formed	TBD
TBD	Una	Newly formed	TBD

=== Jammu and Kashmir ===
Date	Municipal Corporation	Government before	Government after
TBA	Jammu	BJP	TBD
TBA	Srinagar	JKAP	TBD

=== Karnataka ===
Date	Municipal Corporation	Government before	Government after
TBA	Bengaluru Central	BJP (Erstwhile BBMP, now bifurcated and coordinated under an apex body GBA)	TBD
TBA	Bengaluru North	BJP (Erstwhile BBMP, now bifurcated and coordinated under an apex body GBA)	TBD
TBA	Bengaluru East	BJP (Erstwhile BBMP, now bifurcated and coordinated under an apex body GBA)	TBD
TBA	Bengaluru South	BJP (Erstwhile BBMP, now bifurcated and coordinated under an apex body GBA)	TBD
TBA	Bengaluru West	BJP (Erstwhile BBMP, now bifurcated and coordinated under an apex body GBA)	TBD
TBA	Mangaluru	BJP	TBD
TBA	Greater Mysore	BJP	TBD
TBA	Shivamogga	BJP	TBD
TBA	Belagavi	BJP	TBD
TBA	Hubli - Dharwad	BJP	TBD
TBA	Vijayapura	BJP	TBD
TBA	Davanagere	INC	TBD
TBA	Tumakuru	INC	TBD
TBA	Ballari	INC	TBD
TBA	Kalaburagi	INC	TBD
TBA	Raichur	Newly formed	TBD
TBA	Bidar	Newly formed	TBD
TBA	Hassan	Newly formed	TBD

=== Madhya Pradesh ===
Date	Municipal Corporation	Government before	Government after
TBD	Indore	BJP	TBD
TBD	Bhopal	BJP	TBD
TBD	Ujjain	BJP	TBD
TBD	Burhanpur	BJP	TBD
TBD	Khandwa	BJP	TBD
TBD	Sagar	BJP	TBD
TBD	Satna	BJP	TBD
TBD	Jabalpur	BJP	TBD
TBD	Chhindwara	BJP	TBD
TBD	Morena	BJP	TBD
TBD	Dewas	BJP	TBD
TBD	Ratlam	BJP	TBD
TBD	Katni	BJP	TBD
TBD	Gwalior	INC	TBD
TBD	Rewa	INC	TBD
TBD	Singrauli	AAP	TBD

=== Manipur ===
Date	Municipal Corporation	Government before	Government after
TBA	Imphal	INC	TBD

=== Odisha ===
Date	Municipal Corporation	Government before	Government after
TBA	Bhubaneswar	BJD	TBD
TBA	Cuttack	BJD	TBD
TBA	Berhampur	BJD	TBD
TBA	Rourkela	Newly formed	TBD
TBA	Sambalpur	Newly formed	TBD
TBA	Puri	Newly formed	TBD

=== Tamil Nadu ===
Date	Municipal Corporation	Government before	Government after
TBD	Greater Chennai	DMK	TBD
TBD	Tambaram	DMK	TBD
TBD	Avadi	DMK	TBD
TBD	Kancheepuram	DMK	TBD
TBD	Coimbatore	DMK	TBD
TBD	Tiruchirappalli	DMK	TBD
TBD	Madurai	DMK	TBD
TBD	Salem	DMK	TBD
TBD	Tiruppur	DMK	TBD
TBD	Erode	DMK	TBD
TBD	Tirunelveli	DMK	TBD
TBD	Vellore	DMK	TBD
TBD	Thoothukudi	DMK	TBD
TBD	Hosur	DMK	TBD
TBD	Karur	DMK	TBD
TBD	Thanjavur	DMK	TBD
TBD	Nagercoil	DMK	TBD
TBD	Cuddalore	DMK	TBD
TBD	Kumbakonam	DMK	TBD
TBD	Dindigul	DMK	TBD
TBD	Sivakasi	DMK	TBD
TBD	Pudukkottai	Newly formed	TBD
TBD	Karaikudi	Newly formed	TBD
TBD	Namakkal	Newly formed	TBD
TBD	Tiruvannamalai	Newly formed	TBD

=== Telangana ===
Date	Municipal Corporation	Government before	Government after
TBA	Hyderabad	INC (Unified GHMC)	TBD
TBA	Malkajgiri	INC (Unified GHMC)	TBD
TBA	Cyberabad	INC (Unified GHMC)	TBD
TBA	Warangal	BRS	TBD
TBA	Khammam	BRS	TBD

=== West Bengal ===
Date	Municipal Corporation	Government before	Government after
TBD	Kolkata	AITC	TBD
TBD	Howrah	AITC	TBD

=== West Bengal ===
Date	Municipal Corporation	Government before	Government after
TBA	Asansol	AITC	TBD
TBA	Bidhannagar	AITC	TBD
TBA	Chandernagore	AITC	TBD
TBA	Durgapur	AITC	TBD
TBA	Siliguri	AITC	TBD

== Autonomous District Council elections ==
Date	Autonomous Council	State/UT	Government before	Government after
TBA	Tiwa	Assam	BJP	TBD
TBA	Thengal Kachari	Assam	BJP	TBD
TBA	Karbi Anglong	Assam	BJP	TBD
TBA	Deori	Assam	BJP	TBD
TBA	Bodo Kachari	Assam	Newly formed	TBD
TBA	Kamtapur	Assam	Newly formed	TBD
TBA	Matak	Assam	Newly formed	TBD
TBA	Moran	Assam	Newly formed	TBD
TBA	Sadar Hills	Manipur	INC	TBD
TBA	Chandel	Manipur	NPF	TBD
TBA	Manipur North	Manipur	NPF	TBD
TBA	Tamenglong	Manipur	NPF	TBD
TBA	Ukhrul	Manipur	NPF	TBD
TBA	Churachandpur	Manipur	IND	TBD
TBA	Garo Hills	Meghalaya	NPP	TBD
TBA	Mara	Mizoram	BJP	TBD
TBA	Gorkhaland	West Bengal	BGPM	TBD

== See also ==
- 2026 elections in India
- list of elections in 2027
