= List of urban local bodies in Tamil Nadu =

Urban local bodies in Tamil Nadu, consisting of municipal corporations, municipalities, and town panchayats, have been established by the Government of Tamil Nadu in accordance with the Constitution of India. Municipal corporations cater to larger urban areas, municipalities serve smaller urban areas, and town panchayats cater to areas that are under transition from rural to urban. As of 2026, there are 25 municipal corporations, 148 municipalities and 490 town panchayats in Tamil Nadu.

== Municipal Corporations ==
A municipal corporation is headed by a mayor, who presides over elected councilors representing individual wards. Chennai Corporation, established in 1688, is the oldest urban body in India and is the second oldest corporation in the world after London. As of 2026, there are 25 municipal corporations in Tamil Nadu.

Note: Sorted by date of formation followed by alphabetical order

List of Municipal Corporations
No	City	District	Name	Population (Revised) (Note: For corporations which were expanded or newly formed by combining multiple existent administrative units, the figures correspond to the revised estimates based on the 2011 census (wherever data is available). For corporations with no change in limits, the population is quoted as such as per the census.)	Population (2011) (Note: The figures correspond to the limits of the local bodies as existent during the 2011 census)	Date of formation	Number of zones	Wards	Area (km^{2})
1	Chennai	Chennai district	Greater Chennai Corporation	6,672,000	4,646,732	29 September 1688	15	200	426.00
2	Madurai	Madurai district	Madurai Municipal Corporation	1,470,755	1,573,616	1 May 1971	5	100	147.99
3	Coimbatore	Coimbatore district	Coimbatore Municipal Corporation	1,601,438	1,050,721	1 July 1981	5	100	257.04
4	Tiruchirappalli	Tiruchirappalli district	Tiruchirappalli Municipal Corporation	916,674	847,387	1 June 1994	4	65	167.20
5	Salem	Salem district	Salem Municipal Corporation	831,038	829,267	1 June 1994	4	60	91.34
6	Tirunelveli	Tirunelveli district	Tirunelveli Municipal Corporation	874,838	473,637	1 June 1994	4	55	108.65
7	Vellore	Vellore district	Vellore Municipal Corporation	781,966	185,803	1 August 2008	4	60	153.14
8	Tiruppur	Tiruppur district	Tiruppur Municipal Corporation	877,778	444,352	1 January 2008	4	60	159.35
9	Erode	Erode district	Erode Municipal Corporation	498,129	157,101	1 January 2008	4	60	109.52
10	Thoothukudi	Thoothukudi district	Thoothukudi Municipal Corporation	372,408	237,830	5 August 2008	4	60	90.66
11	Dindigul	Dindigul district	Dindigul Municipal Corporation	207,327	207,327	19 February 2014	NA	48	14.01
12	Thanjavur	Thanjavur district	Thanjavur Municipal Corporation	251,655	222,943	19 February 2014	NA	51	128.02
13	Nagercoil	Kanyakumari district	Nagercoil Municipal Corporation	236,774	224,849	20 February 2019	NA	52	80.73
14	Hosur	Krishnagiri district	Hosur Municipal Corporation	245,354	116,821	20 February 2019	NA	45	72.41
15	Avadi	Thiruvallur district	Avadi Municipal Corporation	344,701	344,701	17 June 2019	NA	48	65.00
16	Kumbakonam	Thanjavur district	Kumbakonam Municipal Corporation	222,524	140,113	24 August 2021	NA	48	64.02
17	Cuddalore	Cuddalore district	Cuddalore Municipal corporation	173,639	173,639	21 October 2021	NA	45	27.69
18	Kancheepuram	Kancheepuram district	Kancheepuram Municipal Corporation	232,816	164,384	21 October 2021	NA	51	36.14
19	Karur	Karur district	Karur Municipal corporation	145,278	70,980	21 October 2021	NA	48	53.26
20	Sivakasi	Virudhunagar district	Sivakasi Municipal corporation	126,402	71,040	21 October 2021	NA	48	19.89
21	Tambaram	Chengalpattu district	Tambaram Municipal Corporation	723,017	174,787	21 October 2021	5	70	87.64
22	Karaikudi	Sivaganga district	Karaikudi Municipal Corporation	191,850	106,784	15 March 2024	NA	48	85.68
23	Namakkal	Namakkal district	Namakkal Municipal Corporation	120,957	119,491	15 March 2024	NA	48	55.24
24	Pudukkottai	Pudukkottai district	Pudukottai Municipal Corporation	216,000	117,630	15 March 2024	NA	48	121.00
25	Tiruvannamalai	Tiruvannamalai district	Tiruvannamalai Municipal Corporation	165,000	145,278	15 March 2024	NA	48	102.99

== Municipalities ==
Municipalities are classified into four categories based on their annual income.

Classification of municipalities
Classification	Annual Income	Count
Special Grade	Exceeding Rs.100 million	16
Selection Grade	Between Rs. 60 to 100 million	29
Grade I	Between Rs. 40 to 60 million	31
Grade II	Below Rs. 40 million	62

Their elected representatives include ward councilors and a presiding officer, Municipal Chairperson. Municipal Commissioner is the executive authority. As of 2025, there are 138 municipalities in the state.

List of municipalities
Region	District					
Chengalpattu	Thiruvallur	Chengalpattu	Kanchipuram	Cuddalore		
Chengalpattu	1. Tiruvallur; 2. Tiruttani; 3. Ponneri; 4. Naravarikuppam; 5. Veppampattu	1. Chengalpattu; 2. Maduranthakam; 3. Mamallapuram; 4. Maraimalai Nagar; 5. Nandivaram-Guduvancheri	1. Kundrathur; 2. Mangadu; 3. Sriperumbudur	1. Chidambaram; 2. Panruti; 3. Nellikuppam; 4. Tittakudi; 5. Vadalur; 6. Virudhachalam		
Vellore	Viluppuram	Kallakurichi	Vellore	Ranipet	Tirupathur	Tiruvannamalai
Vellore	1. Kottakuppam; 2. Tindivanam; 3. Viluppuram	1. Kallakurichi; 2. Tirukoilur; 3. Ulundurpettai	1. Gudiyatham; 2. Pernambut	1. Arakkonam; 2. Arcot; 3. Melvisharam; 4. Ranipet; 5. Sholinghur; 6. Walajapet	1. Ambur; 2. Jolarpettai; 3. Tirupattur; 4. Vaniyambadi	1. Arni; 2. Chengam; 3. Polur; 4. Thiruvathipuram; 5. Vandavasi
Salem	Dharmapuri	Salem	Krishnagiri	Namakkal	Karur	
Salem	1. Dharmapuri; 2. Harur	1. Attur; 2. Edaganasalai; 3. Edappadi; 4. Mettur; 5. Narasingapuram; 6. Sangagiri; 7. Tharamangalam	1. Krishnagiri	1. Komarapalayam; 2. Mohanur; 3. Pallipalayam; 4. Rasipuram; 5. Tiruchengode	1. Kulithalai; 2. Pallapatti; 3. Pugalur	
Coimbatore	Coimbatore	Erode	Tiruppur	Nilgiris		
Coimbatore	1. Mettupalayam; 2. Karamadai; 3. Gudalur; 4. Karumathampatti; 5. Sulur; 6. Pollachi; 7. Valparai	1. Bhavani; 2. Gobichettipalayam; 3. Kavandapadi; 4. Perundurai; 5. Punjai Puliampatti; 6. Sathyamangalam	1. Avinashi; 2. Dharapuram; 3. Kangeyam; 4. Palladam; 5. Thirumuruganpoondi; 6. Udumalaipettai; 7. Vellakoil	1. Coonoor; 2. Gudalur; 3. Kotagiri; 4. Nelliyalam; 5. Udagamandalam		
Tiruchirappalli	Tiruchirappalli	Nagapattinam	Mayiladuthurai	Ariyalur		
Tiruchirappalli	1. Manapparai; 2. Musiri; 3. Lalgudi; 4. Thuraiyur; 5. Thuvakudi	1. Nagapattinam; 2. Vedaranyam	1. Mayiladuthurai; 2. Sirkazhi	1. Ariyalur; 2. Jayankondam		
Tiruchirappalli	Perambalur	Thiruvarur	Thanjavur	Pudukkottai		
Tiruchirappalli	1. Perambalur	1. Koothanallur; 2. Mannargudi; 3. Thiruthuraipoondi; 4. Thiruvarur	1. Adirampattinam; 2. Pattukkottai; 3. Thiruvaiyaru	1. Aranthangi		
Madurai	Madurai	Theni	Dindigul	Sivagangai	Ramanathapuram	
Madurai	1. Melur; 2. Thirumangalam; 3. Usilampatti	1. Bodinayakkanur; 2. Chinnamanur; 3. Cumbum; 4. Gudalur; 5. Periyakulam; 6. Theni Allinagaram; 7. Uthamapalayam	1. Kodaikanal; 2. Oddanchatram; 3. Palani	1. Devakottai; 2. Manamadurai; 3. Sivaganga	1. Kilakarai; 2. Paramakudi; 3. Ramanathapuram; 4. Rameswaram	
Tirunelveli	Tirunelveli	Tenkasi	Virudhunagar	Thoothukkudi	Kanniyakumari	
Tirunelveli	1. Ambasamudram; 2. Kalakkad; 3. Vadakkuvalliyur; 4. Vikramasingapuram	1. Kadayanallur; 2. Puliyankudi; 3. Sankarankovil; 4. Sengottai; 5. Surandai; 6. Tenkasi	1. Aruppukkottai; 2. Rajapalayam; 3. Sattur; 4. Srivilliputhur; 5. Virudhunagar	1. Kayalpatnam; 2. Kovilpatti; 3. Tiruchendur	1. Padmanabhapuram; 2. Kuzhithurai; 3. Colachel; 4. Kollankodu; 5. Kanyakumari	

== Town panchayats ==
Tamil Nadu was the first state to establish town panchayats as a new administrative unit. They are classified into four categories based on their annual income.

Classification of town panchayats
Classification	Annual Income	Count
Special Grade	Exceeding Rs.20 million	47
Selection Grade	Between Rs. 10 to 20 million	187
Grade I	Between Rs. 5 to 10 million	194
Grade II	Below Rs. 5 million	62
Total		490

Their elected representatives include councilors and a presiding officer, panchayat chairman. As of 2025, there are 490 town panchayats in the state.
