= 2022 elections in India =

2022 Indian elections
- ← 2020 2021 2022 2023 2024 →
- Next Lok Sabha: 17th

Presidential election
- Partisan control: NDA hold
- Electoral vote
- Draupadi Murmu: 676,803
- Yashwant Sinha: 380,177

Vice presidential election
- Partisan control: NDA hold
- Electoral vote
- Jagdeep Dhankhar: 528
- Margaret Alva: 182

State elections
- States contested: 7 of 31 states
- Net state change: NDA -1

State by-elections
- Seats contested: 86
- Net seat change: NDA +7

Elections in India in 2022 include election to the office of the President of India, vice president of India, by-elections to the Lok Sabha, elections to the Rajya Sabha, elections to state legislative assemblies of 7 (seven) states, by-elections to state legislative assemblies and numerous other elections and by-elections to state legislative councils and local bodies.

== Presidential election ==
The presidential election was held on 18 July 2022. The counting of votes took place on 21 July 2022 and Droupadi Murmu was elected as the next President of India.

Date	President before election	Party before election	Elected president	Party after election
18 July 2022	Ram Nath Kovind	Bharatiya Janata Party	Droupadi Murmu	Bharatiya Janata Party

== Vice presidential election ==
Vice presidential election was held on 6 August 2022. The votes were counted on the same day and Jagdeep Dhankhar was elected as the next Vice president of India.

Date	Vice president before election	Party before election	Elected vice president	Party after election
6 August 2022	Venkaiah Naidu	Bharatiya Janata Party	Jagdeep Dhankhar	Bharatiya Janata Party

== Lok Sabha by-elections ==
S.No	Date	Constituency	State/UT	MP before election	Party before election	Elected MP	Party after election	Remarks
40	12 April 2022	Asansol	West Bengal	Babul Supriyo	Bharatiya Janata Party	Shatrughan Sinha	Trinamool Congress	Resignation by Babul Supriyo
12	23 June 2022	Sangrur	Punjab	Bhagwant Mann	Aam Aadmi Party	Simranjit Singh Mann	Shiromani Akali Dal (Amritsar)	Resignation by Bhagwant Mann
7	23 June 2022	Rampur	Uttar Pradesh	Azam Khan	Samajwadi Party	Ghanshyam Singh Lodhi	Bharatiya Janata Party	Resignation by Azam Khan
69	23 June 2022	Azamgarh	Uttar Pradesh	Akhilesh Yadav	Samajwadi Party	Dinesh Lal Yadav "Nirahua"	Bharatiya Janata Party	Resignation by Akhilesh Yadav
21	5 December 2022	Mainpuri	Uttar Pradesh	Mulayam Singh Yadav	Samajwadi Party	Dimple Yadav	Samajwadi Party	Death of Mulayam Singh Yadav

== State legislative assembly elections ==
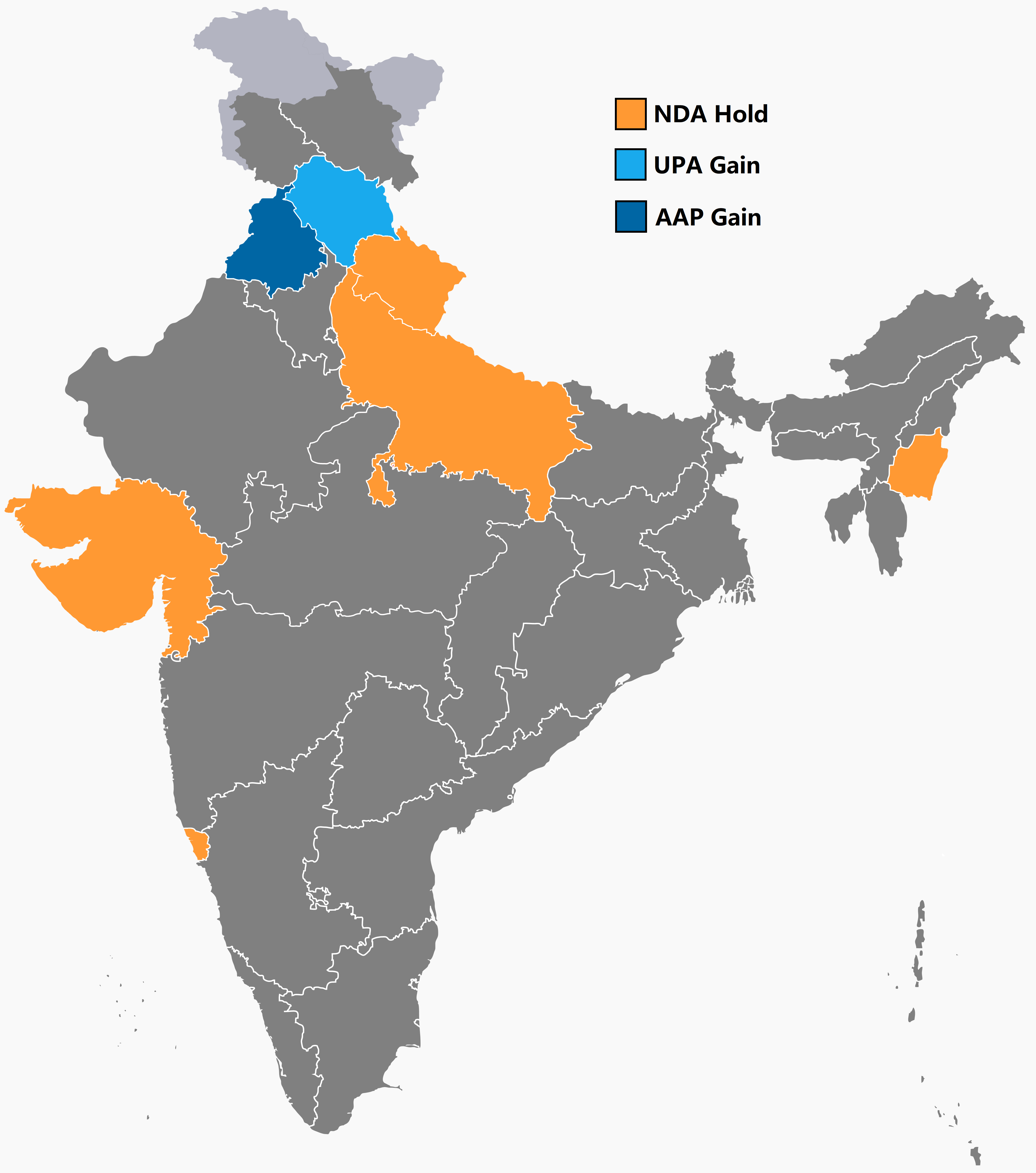
2022 Indian Election Results

Date(s)	State	Government before election	Chief Minister before election	Government after election	Chief Minister after election	Maps
14 February 2022	Goa	Bharatiya Janata Party	Pramod Sawant	Bharatiya Janata Party	Pramod Sawant	
14 February 2022	Goa	Bharatiya Janata Party	Pramod Sawant	Maharashtrawadi Gomantak Party	Pramod Sawant	
14 February 2022	Uttarakhand	Bharatiya Janata Party	Pushkar Singh Dhami	Bharatiya Janata Party	Pushkar Singh Dhami	
20 February 2022	Punjab	Indian National Congress	Charanjit Singh Channi	Aam Aadmi Party	Bhagwant Singh Mann	
28 February and 5 March 2022	Manipur	Bharatiya Janata Party	N. Biren Singh	Bharatiya Janata Party	N. Biren Singh	
28 February and 5 March 2022	Manipur	National People's Party	N. Biren Singh	Bharatiya Janata Party	N. Biren Singh	
28 February and 5 March 2022	Manipur	Naga People's Front	N. Biren Singh	Bharatiya Janata Party	N. Biren Singh	
10, 14, 20, 23, 27 February, 3 and 7 March 2022	Uttar Pradesh	Bharatiya Janata Party	Yogi Adityanath	Bharatiya Janata Party	Yogi Adityanath	
10, 14, 20, 23, 27 February, 3 and 7 March 2022	Uttar Pradesh	Bharatiya Janata Party	Yogi Adityanath	NISHAD Party	Yogi Adityanath	
10, 14, 20, 23, 27 February, 3 and 7 March 2022	Uttar Pradesh	Bharatiya Janata Party	Yogi Adityanath	Apna Dal	Yogi Adityanath	
12 November 2022	Himachal Pradesh	Bharatiya Janata Party	Jai Ram Thakur	Indian National Congress	Sukhvinder Singh Sukhu	
1 and 5 December 2022	Gujarat	Bharatiya Janata Party	Bhupendrabhai Patel	Bharatiya Janata Party	Bhupendrabhai Patel	

== Legislative Assembly by-elections ==
=== Andhra Pradesh ===
Date	S.No	Constituency	MLA before election	Party before election	Elected MLA	Party after election
23 June 2022	115	Atmakur	Mekapati Goutham Reddy	YSR Congress Party	Mekapati Vikram Reddy	YSR Congress Party

=== Assam ===
Date	S.No	Constituency	MLA before election	Party before election	Elected MLA	Party after election
7 March 2022	99	Majuli	Sarbananda Sonowal	Bharatiya Janata Party	Bhuban Gam	Bharatiya Janata Party

=== Bihar ===
Date	S.No	Constituency	MLA before election	Party before election	Elected MLA	Party after election
12 April 2022	91	Bochahan	Musafir Paswan	Vikassheel Insaan Party	Amar Kumar Paswan	Rashtriya Janata Dal
3 November 2022	101	Gopalganj	Subash Singh	Bharatiya Janata Party	Kusum Devi	Bharatiya Janata Party
3 November 2022	178	Mokama	Anant Kumar Singh	Rashtriya Janata Dal	Nilam Devi	Rashtriya Janata Dal
5 December 2022	93	Kurhani	Anil Sahani	Rashtriya Janata Dal	Kedar Prasad Gupta	Bharatiya Janata Party

=== Chhattisgarh ===
Date	S.No	Constituency	MLA before election	Party before election	Elected MLA	Party after election
12 April 2022	73	Khairagarh	Devwrat Singh	Janta Congress Chhattisgarh	Yashoda Verma	Indian National Congress
5 December 2022	80	Bhanupratappur	Manoj Singh Mandavi	Indian National Congress	Savitri Manoj Mandavi	Indian National Congress

=== Delhi ===
Date	S.No	Constituency	MLA before election	Party before election	Elected MLA	Party after election
23 June 2022	39	Rajinder Nagar	Raghav Chadha	Aam Aadmi Party	Durgesh Pathak	Aam Aadmi Party

=== Jharkhand ===
Date	S.No	Constituency	MLA before election	Party before election	Elected MLA	Party after election
23 June 2022	66	Mandar	Bandhu Tirkey	Indian National Congress	Shilpi Neha Tirkey	Indian National Congress

=== Haryana ===
Date	S.No	Constituency	MLA before election	Party before election	Elected MLA	Party after election
3 November 2022	47	Adampur	Kuldeep Bishnoi	Indian National Congress	Bhavya Bishnoi	Bharatiya Janata Party

=== Kerala ===
Date	S.No	Constituency	MLA before election	Party before election	Elected MLA	Party after election
31 May 2022	83	Thrikkakara	P. T. Thomas	Indian National Congress	Uma Thomas	Indian National Congress

=== Maharashtra ===
Date	S.No	Constituency	MLA before election	Party before election	Elected MLA	Party after election
12 April 2022	82	Kolhapur North	Chandrakant Jadhav	Indian National Congress	Jayshri Jadhav	Indian National Congress
3 November 2022	26	Andheri East	Ramesh Latke	Shiv Sena	Rutuja Latke	Shiv Sena (Uddhav Balasaheb Thackeray)

=== Odisha ===
Date	S.No	Constituency	MLA before election	Party before election	Elected MLA	Party after election
31 May 2022	6	Brajarajnagar	Kishore Kumar Mohanty	Biju Janata Dal	Alka Mohanty	Biju Janata Dal
3 November 2022	46	Dhamnagar	Bishnu Sethi	Bharatiya Janata Party	Suryabanshi Suraj	Bharatiya Janata Party
5 December 2022	1	Padampur	Bijaya Ranjan Singh Bariha	Biju Janata Dal	Barsha Singh Bariha	Biju Janata Dal

=== Rajasthan ===
Date	S.No	Constituency	MLA before election	Party before election	Elected MLA	Party after election
5 December 2022	21	Sardarshahar	Bhanwar Lal Sharma	Indian National Congress	Anil Kumar Sharma	Indian National Congress

=== Telangana ===
Date	S.No	Constituency	MLA before election	Party before election	Elected MLA	Party after election
3 November 2022	93	Munugode	Komatireddy Raj Gopal Reddy	Indian National Congress	Kusukuntla Prabhakar Reddy	Bharat Rashtra Samithi

=== Tripura ===
Date	S.No	Constituency	MLA before election	Party before election	Elected MLA	Party after election
23 June 2022	6	Agartala	Sudip Roy Barman	Bharatiya Janata Party	Sudip Roy Barman	Indian National Congress
23 June 2022	8	Town Bordowali	Ashish Kumar Saha	Bharatiya Janata Party	Manik Saha	Bharatiya Janata Party
23 June 2022	46	Surma	Asish Das	Bharatiya Janata Party	Swapna Das Paul	Bharatiya Janata Party
23 June 2022	57	Jubarajnagar	Ramendra Chandra Debnath	Communist Party of India (Marxist)	Malina Debnath	Bharatiya Janata Party

=== Uttar Pradesh ===
Date	S.No	Constituency	MLA before election	Party before election	Elected MLA	Party after election
3 November 2022	139	Gola Gokrannath	Arvind Giri	Bharatiya Janata Party	Aman Giri	Bharatiya Janata Party
5 December 2022	37	Rampur	Azam Khan	Samajwadi Party	Akash Saxena	Bharatiya Janata Party
5 December 2022	15	Khatauli	Vikram Singh Saini	Bharatiya Janata Party	Madan Kasana	Rashtriya Lok Dal

=== Uttarakhand ===
Date	S.No.	Constituency	MLA before election	Party before election	Elected MLA	Party after election
31 May 2022	55	Champawat	Kailash Chandra Gahtori	Bharatiya Janata Party	Pushkar Singh Dhami	Bharatiya Janata Party

=== West Bengal ===
Date	Constituency		Previous MLA		Reason	Elected MLA	
12 April 2022	161	Ballygunge	Subrata Mukherjee	Trinamool Congress	Died on 4 November 2021	Babul Supriyo	Trinamool Congress

== Local body elections ==
=== Andaman and Nicobar Islands ===
Date	Municipal council	Government before	Government after
6 March 2022	Port Blair Municipal Council	Bharatiya Janata Party	Bharatiya Janata Party

=== Assam ===
Date	Municipal corporation/ Autonomous Council	Government before	Government after
20 January 2022	Thengal Kachari Autonomous Council	Bharatiya Janata Party	Bharatiya Janata Party
22 April 2022	Guwahati Municipal Corporation	Indian National Congress	Bharatiya Janata Party
8 June 2022	Karbi Anglong Autonomous Council	Bharatiya Janata Party	Bharatiya Janata Party
8 November 2022	Deori Autonomous Council	Bharatiya Janata Party	Bharatiya Janata Party

=== Delhi ===
Date	Municipal corporation	Government before	Government after
4 December 2022	Delhi Municipal Corporation	Bharatiya Janata Party	Aam Aadmi Party

=== Karnataka ===
Date	Municipal corporation	Government before	Government after
28 October 2022	Vijayapura City Corporation	Indian National Congress	Bharatiya Janata Party

=== Madhya Pradesh ===
Date	Municipal Corporation	Government before	Government after
6 July 2022	Indore Municipal Corporation	Bharatiya Janata Party	Bharatiya Janata Party
6 July 2022	Bhopal Municipal Corporation	Bharatiya Janata Party	Bharatiya Janata Party
6 July 2022	Ujjain Municipal Corporation	Bharatiya Janata Party	Bharatiya Janata Party
6 July 2022	Burhanpur Municipal Corporation	Bharatiya Janata Party	Bharatiya Janata Party
6 July 2022	Khandwa Municipal Corporation	Bharatiya Janata Party	Bharatiya Janata Party
6 July 2022	Sagar Municipal Corporation	Bharatiya Janata Party	Bharatiya Janata Party
6 July 2022	Satna Municipal Corporation	Bharatiya Janata Party	Bharatiya Janata Party
6 July 2022	Singrauli Municipal Corporation	Bharatiya Janata Party	Aam Aadmi Party
6 July 2022	Gwalior Municipal Corporation	Bharatiya Janata Party	Indian National Congress
6 July 2022	Jabalpur Municipal Corporation	Bharatiya Janata Party	Indian National Congress
6 July 2022	Chhindwara Municipal Corporation	Bharatiya Janata Party	Indian National Congress
13 July 2022	Rewa Municipal Corporation	Bharatiya Janata Party	Indian National Congress
13 July 2022	Morena Municipal Corporation	Bharatiya Janata Party	Indian National Congress
13 July 2022	Dewas Municipal Corporation	Bharatiya Janata Party	Bharatiya Janata Party
13 July 2022	Ratlam Municipal Corporation	Bharatiya Janata Party	Bharatiya Janata Party
13 July 2022	Katni Municipal Corporation	Bharatiya Janata Party	Independent

=== Mizoram ===
Date	Municipal Corporation/ Autonomous Council	Government before	Government after
5 May 2022	Mara Autonomous District Council	Indian National Congress	Indian National Congress

=== Odisha ===
Date	Municipal corporation	Government before	Government after
24 March 2022	Bhubaneswar Municipal Corporation	Biju Janata Dal	Biju Janata Dal
24 March 2022	Cuttack Municipal Corporation	Biju Janata Dal	Biju Janata Dal
24 March 2022	Berhampur Municipal Corporation	Biju Janata Dal	Biju Janata Dal

=== Tamil Nadu ===
Date	Municipal corporation	Government before	Government after
19 February 2022	Greater Chennai Corporation	All India Anna Dravida Munnetra Kazhagam	Dravida Munnetra Kazhagam
19 February 2022	Coimbatore City Municipal Corporation	All India Anna Dravida Munnetra Kazhagam	Dravida Munnetra Kazhagam
19 February 2022	Tiruchirappalli City Municipal Corporation	All India Anna Dravida Munnetra Kazhagam	Dravida Munnetra Kazhagam
19 February 2022	Corporation of Madurai	All India Anna Dravida Munnetra Kazhagam	Dravida Munnetra Kazhagam
19 February 2022	Salem City Municipal Corporation	All India Anna Dravida Munnetra Kazhagam	Dravida Munnetra Kazhagam
19 February 2022	Tirunelveli City Municipal Corporation	All India Anna Dravida Munnetra Kazhagam	Dravida Munnetra Kazhagam
19 February 2022	Tiruppur City Municipal Corporation	All India Anna Dravida Munnetra Kazhagam	Dravida Munnetra Kazhagam
19 February 2022	Vellore Corporation	All India Anna Dravida Munnetra Kazhagam	Dravida Munnetra Kazhagam
19 February 2022	Erode City Municipal Corporation	All India Anna Dravida Munnetra Kazhagam	Dravida Munnetra Kazhagam
19 February 2022	Thoothukudi Municipal Corporation	All India Anna Dravida Munnetra Kazhagam	Dravida Munnetra Kazhagam
19 February 2022	Thanjavur City Municipal Corporation	All India Anna Dravida Munnetra Kazhagam	Dravida Munnetra Kazhagam
19 February 2022	Dindigul City Municipal Corporation	All India Anna Dravida Munnetra Kazhagam	Dravida Munnetra Kazhagam
19 February 2022	Hosur City Municipal Corporation	did not exist	Dravida Munnetra Kazhagam
19 February 2022	Nagercoil Corporation	did not exist	Dravida Munnetra Kazhagam
19 February 2022	Avadi City Municipal Corporation	did not exist	Dravida Munnetra Kazhagam
19 February 2022	Kancheepuram City Municipal Corporation	did not exist	Dravida Munnetra Kazhagam
19 February 2022	Karur City Municipal Corporation	did not exist	Dravida Munnetra Kazhagam
19 February 2022	Cuddalore City Municipal Corporation	did not exist	Dravida Munnetra Kazhagam
19 February 2022	Sivakasi City Municipal Corporation	did not exist	Dravida Munnetra Kazhagam
19 February 2022	Tambaram City Municipal Corporation	did not exist	Dravida Munnetra Kazhagam
19 February 2022	Kumbakonam City Municipal Corporation	did not exist	Dravida Munnetra Kazhagam

=== West Bengal ===
Date	Municipal Corporation/ Autonomous Council	Government before	Government after
12 February 2022	Asansol Municipal Corporation	Trinamool Congress	Trinamool Congress
12 February 2022	Bidhannagar Municipal Corporation	Trinamool Congress	Trinamool Congress
12 February 2022	Chandernagore Municipal Corporation	Trinamool Congress	Trinamool Congress
12 February 2022	Siliguri Municipal Corporation	Communist Party of India (Marxist)	Trinamool Congress
26 June 2022	Gorkhaland Territorial Administration	Gorkha Janmukti Morcha	Bharatiya Gorkha Prajatantrik Morcha

== See also ==
- 2021 elections in India
- 2023 elections in India
- 2022 Indian Rajya Sabha elections
- 2022 Indian National Congress presidential election
