= List of municipal corporations in Tamil Nadu =

Municipal Corporations are the local governing bodies of the urban areas in the Indian state of Tamil Nadu. A municipal corporation carries out its functions through well organized divisions or departments. The 74th Amendment to the Constitution of India defined the formations of urban local governments and their activities.

The Greater Chennai Corporation, which was established on 29 September 1688 as the Corporation of Madras, is the oldest municipal corporation in India and the second oldest in the world after London. It is the largest city corporation of Tamil Nadu, both in area and population. Madurai Municipal Corporation was established in 1971 and Coimbatore Municipal Corporation in 1981. Three more were established in 1994 and the count remained at six till 2007. Since then 19 more urban bodies have been upgraded as municipal corporations. As of 2026, there are 25 municipal corporations in the state.

== List of municipal corporations ==
Note: Sorted by date of formation followed by alphabetical order

List of municipal corporations
| No | City | District | Name | Population (revised) (Note: For corporations which were expanded or newly formed by combining multiple existent administrative units, the figures correspond to the revised estimates based on the 2011 census (wherever data is available). For corporations with no change in limits, the population is quoted as such as per the census.) | Population (2011) (Note: The figures correspond to the limits of the local bodies as existent during the 2011 census) | Date of formation | Number of zones | Wards | Area (km^{2}) |
|---|---|---|---|---|---|---|---|---|---|
| 1 | Chennai | Chennai district | Greater Chennai Corporation | 6,672,000 | 4,646,732 | 29 September 1688 | 15 | 200 | 426.00 |
| 2 | Madurai | Madurai district | Madurai Municipal Corporation | 1,470,755 | 1,573,616 | 1 May 1971 | 5 | 100 | 147.99 |
| 3 | Coimbatore | Coimbatore district | Coimbatore Municipal Corporation | 1,601,438 | 1,050,721 | 1 July 1981 | 5 | 100 | 456.0 |
| 4 | Tiruchirappalli | Tiruchirappalli district | Tiruchirappalli Municipal Corporation | 916,674 | 847,387 | 1 June 1994 | 4 | 65 | 167.20 |
| 5 | Salem | Salem district | Salem Municipal Corporation | 831,038 | 829,267 | 1 June 1994 | 4 | 60 | 91.34 |
| 6 | Tirunelveli | Tirunelveli district | Tirunelveli Municipal Corporation | 874,838 | 473,637 | 1 June 1994 | 4 | 55 | 108.65 |
| 7 | Vellore | Vellore district | Vellore Municipal Corporation | 781,966 | 185,803 | 1 August 2008 | 4 | 60 | 153.14 |
| 8 | Tiruppur | Tiruppur district | Tiruppur Municipal Corporation | 877,778 | 444,352 | 1 January 2008 | 4 | 60 | 159.35 |
| 9 | Erode | Erode district | Erode Municipal Corporation | 498,129 | 157,101 | 1 January 2008 | 4 | 60 | 109.52 |
| 10 | Thoothukudi | Thoothukudi district | Thoothukudi Municipal Corporation | 372,408 | 237,830 | 5 August 2008 | 4 | 60 | 90.66 |
| 11 | Dindigul | Dindigul district | Dindigul Municipal Corporation | 207,327 | 207,327 | 19 February 2014 | NA | 48 | 14.01 |
| 12 | Thanjavur | Thanjavur district | Thanjavur Municipal Corporation | 251,655 | 222,943 | 19 February 2014 | NA | 51 | 128.02 |
| 13 | Nagercoil | Kanyakumari district | Nagercoil Municipal Corporation | 236,774 | 224,849 | 20 February 2019 | NA | 52 | 80.73 |
| 14 | Hosur | Krishnagiri district | Hosur Municipal Corporation | 245,354 | 116,821 | 20 February 2019 | NA | 45 | 72.41 |
| 15 | Avadi | Thiruvallur district | Avadi Municipal Corporation | 344,701 | 344,701 | 17 June 2019 | NA | 48 | 65.00 |
| 16 | Kumbakonam | Thanjavur district | Kumbakonam Municipal Corporation | 222,524 | 140,113 | 24 August 2021 | NA | 48 | 64.02 |
| 17 | Cuddalore | Cuddalore district | Cuddalore Municipal corporation | 173,639 | 173,639 | 21 October 2021 | NA | 45 | 27.69 |
| 18 | Kancheepuram | Kancheepuram district | Kancheepuram Municipal Corporation | 232,816 | 164,384 | 21 October 2021 | NA | 51 | 36.14 |
| 19 | Karur | Karur district | Karur Municipal corporation | 145,278 | 70,980 | 21 October 2021 | NA | 48 | 53.26 |
| 20 | Sivakasi | Virudhunagar district | Sivakasi Municipal corporation | 126,402 | 71,040 | 21 October 2021 | NA | 48 | 19.89 |
| 21 | Tambaram | Chengalpattu district | Tambaram Municipal Corporation | 723,017 | 174,787 | 21 October 2021 | 5 | 70 | 87.64 |
| 22 | Karaikudi | Sivaganga district | Karaikudi Municipal Corporation | 191,850 | 106,784 | 15 March 2024 | NA | 48 | 85.68 |
| 23 | Namakkal | Namakkal district | Namakkal Municipal Corporation | 120,957 | 119,491 | 15 March 2024 | NA | 48 | 55.24 |
| 24 | Pudukkottai | Pudukkottai district | Pudukottai Municipal Corporation | 216,000 | 117,630 | 15 March 2024 | NA | 48 | 121.00 |
| 25 | Tiruvannamalai | Tiruvannamalai district | Tiruvannamalai Municipal Corporation | 210,491 | 145,278 | 15 March 2024 | NA | 48 | 102.99 |

== See also ==
- List of municipalities in Tamil Nadu
- List of nagar panchayats in Tamil Nadu
- List of urban local bodies in Tamil Nadu
- List of metropolitan areas in Tamil Nadu
- List of most populous metropolitan areas in India
- List of most populous cities in India
