= Local elections in Tamil Nadu =

Elections to Local Bodies in Tamil Nadu are conducted once in five years to elect the representatives to the Urban and Rural local bodies. These elections are conducted by Tamil Nadu State Election Commission

== Local Bodies in Tamil Nadu ==
Urban local bodies include 25 Municipal corporations, 148 Municipalities and 561 Town panchayats.

Rural local bodies include 12,620 Village Panchayats, 385 Panchayat Unions, and 37 District Panchayats.

== Previous elections ==
The first election to the local bodies in Tamil Nadu were held in October 1996. Subsequent elections were conducted in October 2001 and October 2006. Recent elections to Local bodies were held in two phases in the month of October 2011 - 17 October 2011 and 19 October 2011.

=== 2011 local body elections ===
AIADMK received 39.02% of the popular vote: 39.24% of the urban vote and 38.69% of the rural vote. DMK received 26.09% of the popular vote: 26.67% of the urban vote and 25.71% of the rural vote. DMDK received 10.11% of the popular vote. Congress received 5.71% of the popular vote. PMK received 3.55% of the popular vote. MDMK received 1.70% of the popular vote. The Communist Party (Marxist) received 1.02% of the popular vote, and the Communist Party 0.71%. Independents received an additional 9.46% of votes.

Elections to village panchayats are non-party contests.

City Municipal Corporation mayoral results
Corporation	Winner		Runner-up	
Corporation	Candidate	Party	Candidate	Party
Chennai	Saidai Sa. Duraisamy	AIADMK	M. Subramaniam	DMK
Coimbatore	S. M. Velusamy	AIADMK	N. Karthik	DMK
Madurai	V. V. Rajan Chellappa	AIADMK	P. Packianathan	DMK
Tiruchirapalli	M. S. R. Jaya	AIADMK	J. Vijaya Jayaraj	DMK
Salem	S. Soundappan	AIADMK	S. T. Kalai Amudhan	DMK
Tirunelveli	Vijila Sathyanand	AIADMK	S. Amutha	DMK
Erode	Mallika Paramasivam	AIADMK	A. Sellaponni Manoharan	DMK
Tirupur	A. Visalakshi	AIADMK	K. Selvaraj	DMK
Vellore	P. Karthiyayini	AIADMK	R. Rajeswari	DMK
Thoothukudi	Sasikala Pushpa	AIADMK	Pon Initha	DMK

Urban - Corporation Councilor
1. AIADMK (71.3%)
2. DMK (15.8%)
3. IND (6.71%)
4. INC (2.07%)
5. MDMK (1.34%)
6. DMDK (0.98%)
7. BJP (0.49%)
8. CPI (0.49%)
9. PMK (0.24%)
10. CPI(M) (0.37%)
11. Others (0.12%)

Urban Local Body results
Local Body/Party	Corporation Mayor	Corporation Councilor	Municipal chairman	Municipal Councilor	Town Panchayat chairman	Town Pt. Ward Member
All India Anna Dravida Munnetra Kazhagam	10	585	90	1,688	287	2,928
Bharatiya Janata Party	0	4	2	37	13	181
Communist Party of India	0	4	0	10	2	32
CPI(M)	0	3	2	20	5	103
Dravida Munnetra Kazhagam	0	130	23	964	121	1,833
Indian National Congress	0	17	0	165	24	386
Marumalarchi Dravida Munnetra Kazhagam	0	11	1	49	7	82
Pattali Makkal Katchi	0	2	0	60	2	109
Desiya Murpokku Dravida Kazhagam	0	8	2	119	3	395
Viduthalai Chiruthaigal Katchi	0	2	0	13	0	11
Bahujan Samaj Party	0	0	0	2	0	2
Rashtriya Janata Dal	0	0	0	1	0	7
Puthiya Tamilagam	0	0	0	0	0	7
All India Forward Bloc	0	0	0	0	0	1
Indhiya Jananayaga Katchi	0	0	0	2	0	3
Independent politician	0	55	5	554	65	2,179
Others	0	0	0	12	0	15

Rural Local Body results
Local Body/Party	District Councilor	Township Councilor
All India Anna Dravida Munnetra Kazhagam	602	3,893
Bharatiya Janata Party	2	29
Communist Party of India	4	49
CPI(M)	2	25
Dravida Munnetra Kazhagam	30	1,007
Indian National Congress	5	153
Marumalarchi Dravida Munnetra Kazhagam	2	45
Pattali Makkal Katchi	3	229
Desiya Murpokku Dravida Kazhagam	5	339
Viduthalai Chiruthaigal Katchi	0	6
Puthiya Tamilagam	0	9
Rashtriya Janata Dal	0	1
Bahujan Samaj Party	0	1
Independent politician	0	679
Others	0	2

=== 2019 Rural local body election ===
Rural Local Body results
Local Body/Party	District Panchayat Chairmen	District Panchayat Councillors	Panchayat Union Chairmen	Panchayat Union Councillor
DMK	12	243	125	2111
AIADMK	13	214	140	1797
PMK	1	16	7	224
CPI	0	7	3	64
BJP	0	7	3	88
INC	0	13	5	132
AMMK	0	0	2	94
CPI(M)	0	2	0	33
DMDK	0	4	0	99
MDMK	0	2	0	20
VCK	0	1	0	8
TMC(M)	0	1	0	8
NTK	0	0	0	0
Independent	0	3	25	440
Total seats faced election	26	515	314	5090

- Corporation Mayor, Chairman of Municipalities and Town panchayat will be elected through in-direct election method.

i.e. The elected Councillors of the local bodies will elect the heads of the urban local bodies among-st themselves after the results.

Urban Local body elections and elections for the newly formed 9 districts were not held due to pandemic situation.

=== 2022 Urban local body election ===
Counting of votes commenced on 22 February 2022. Official results were published on Tamil Nadu State Election Commission website.

Date	Municipal corporation	Government before	Government after
19 February 2022	Coimbatore City Municipal Corporation	All India Anna Dravida Munnetra Kazhagam	Dravida Munnetra Kazhagam
19 February 2022	Dindigul City Municipal Corporation	All India Anna Dravida Munnetra Kazhagam	Dravida Munnetra Kazhagam
19 February 2022	Erode City Municipal Corporation	All India Anna Dravida Munnetra Kazhagam	Dravida Munnetra Kazhagam
19 February 2022	Greater Chennai Corporation	All India Anna Dravida Munnetra Kazhagam	Dravida Munnetra Kazhagam
19 February 2022	Madurai Municipal Corporation	All India Anna Dravida Munnetra Kazhagam	Dravida Munnetra Kazhagam
19 February 2022	Salem City Municipal Corporation	All India Anna Dravida Munnetra Kazhagam	Dravida Munnetra Kazhagam
19 February 2022	Thanjavur City Municipal Corporation	All India Anna Dravida Munnetra Kazhagam	Dravida Munnetra Kazhagam
19 February 2022	Thoothukkudi City Municipal Corporation	All India Anna Dravida Munnetra Kazhagam	Dravida Munnetra Kazhagam
19 February 2022	Tiruchirappalli City Municipal Corporation	All India Anna Dravida Munnetra Kazhagam	Dravida Munnetra Kazhagam
19 February 2022	Tirunelveli City Municipal Corporation	All India Anna Dravida Munnetra Kazhagam	Dravida Munnetra Kazhagam
19 February 2022	Tiruppur City Municipal Corporation	All India Anna Dravida Munnetra Kazhagam	Dravida Munnetra Kazhagam
19 February 2022	Vellore Corporation	All India Anna Dravida Munnetra Kazhagam	Dravida Munnetra Kazhagam
19 February 2022	Hosur City Municipal Corporation	did not exist	Dravida Munnetra Kazhagam
19 February 2022	Nagercoil Corporation	did not exist	Dravida Munnetra Kazhagam
19 February 2022	Avadi City Municipal Corporation	did not exist	Dravida Munnetra Kazhagam
19 February 2022	Kancheepuram City Municipal Corporation	did not exist	Dravida Munnetra Kazhagam
19 February 2022	Karur City Municipal Corporation	did not exist	Dravida Munnetra Kazhagam
19 February 2022	Cuddalore City Municipal Corporation	did not exist	Dravida Munnetra Kazhagam
19 February 2022	Sivakasi City Municipal Corporation	did not exist	Dravida Munnetra Kazhagam
19 February 2022	Tambaram City Municipal Corporation	did not exist	Dravida Munnetra Kazhagam
19 February 2022	Kumbakonam City Municipal Corporation	did not exist	Dravida Munnetra Kazhagam

== See also ==
- Tamil Nadu State Election Commission
