= Next Tamil Nadu local elections =

- January - February
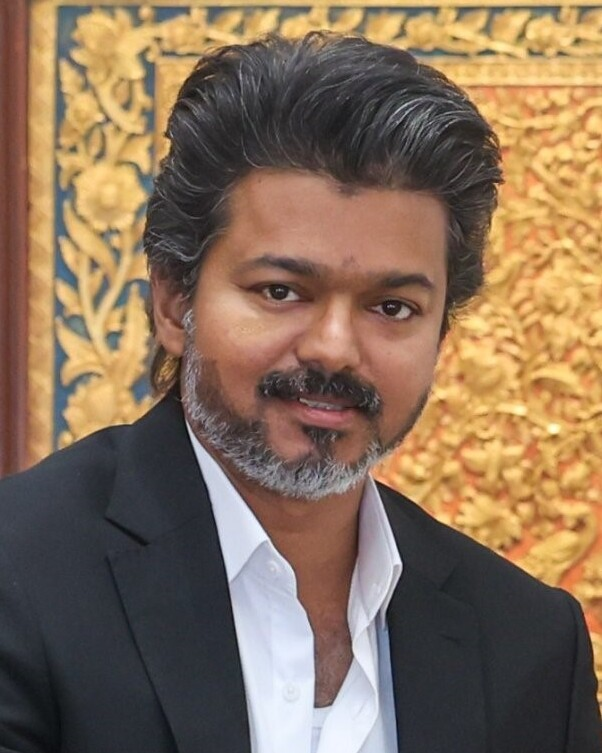

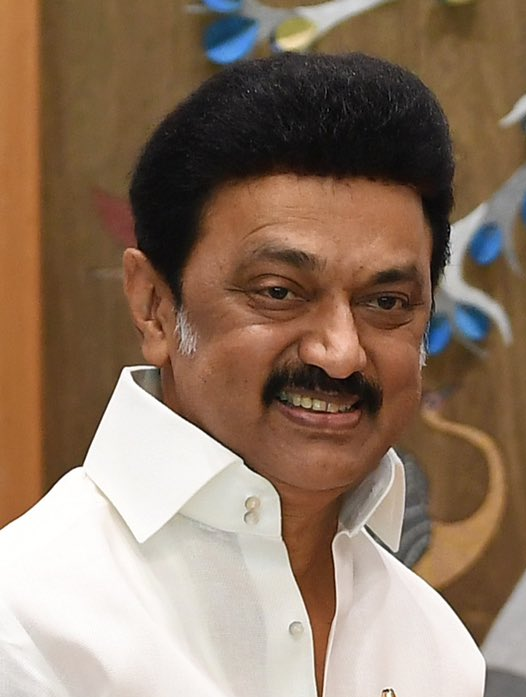

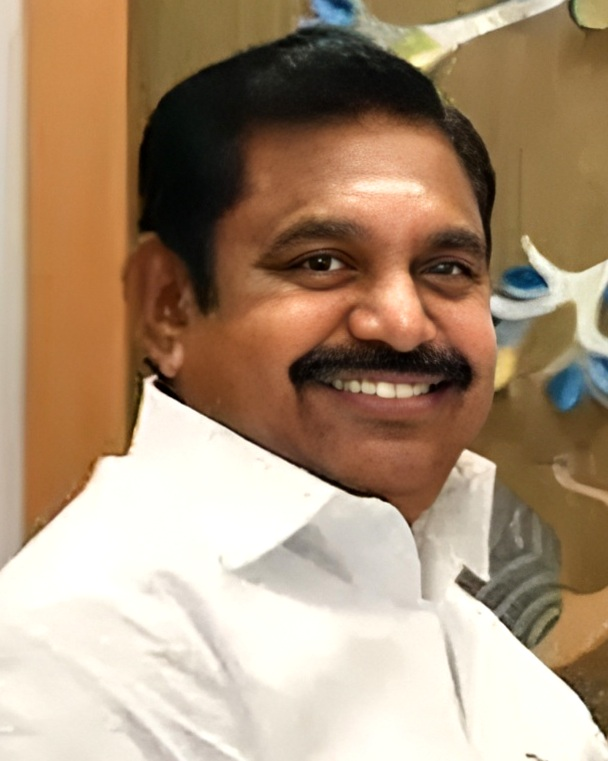
Leader	C. Joseph Vijay	M. K. Stalin	Edappadi K. Palaniswami
Party	TVK	DMK	AIADMK
Alliance	SSJVA	DMK+	AIADMK+
Leader since	2024	2018	2017
Last election	New entry	2360	638

The Next Tamil Nadu local elections are expected to be held in early 2027 to elect representatives to urban and rural local bodies in the Indian state of Tamil Nadu. As of October 2026, an official polling date had not been announced. The Tamil Nadu State Election Commission was undertaking the delimitation of wards ahead of the elections; the terms of elected representatives in rural local bodies had already ended in most districts, while the terms of urban local-body representatives are due to end on 1 March 2027.

The elections cover local authorities including municipal corporations, municipalities, town panchayats and rural local bodies. Mayors and the chairpersons of municipalities and town panchayats are elected indirectly by the councillors of those bodies. The previous urban local-body elections were held in February 2022.

== Seats ==
S.No	District	Corporation	Corporation councilor	Municipal councilor	Town panchayat ward members
1	Ariyalur			39	30
2	Erode	Erode	60	102	628
3	Cuddalore	Cuddalore	45	180	222
4	Karur	Karur	48	75	123
5	Kallakurichi			72	81
6	Kanyakumari	Nagercoil	52	99	828
7	Kanchipuram	Kancheepuram	50	57	48
8	Krishnagiri	Hosur	45	33	93
9	Coimbatore	Coimbatore	100	198	513
10	Sivaganga	Karaikudi	48	117	167
11	Chengalpattu	Tambaram	70	108	99
12	Chennai	Greater Chennai	200		
13	Salem	Salem	60	165	474
14	Thanjavur	Thanjavur | Kumbakonam	99	60	299
15	Dharmapuri	Hosur	45	33	159
16	Dindigul	Dindigul	48	75	363
17	Tiruchirappalli	Tiruchirappalli	65	120	216
18	Tirunelveli	Tirunelveli	55	69	273
19	Tirupathur			126	45
20	Tiruppur	Tiruppur	60	147	233
21	Tiruvannamalai	Tiruvannamalai	48	123	150
22	Tiruvallur	Aavadi	48	141	129
23	Tiruvarur			111	105
24	Thoothukudi	Thoothukkudi	60	81	261
25	Tenkasi			180	260
26	Theni			177	336
27	Nagapattinam			57	60
28	Namakkal	Namakkal	48	153	294
29	Nilgiris			108	186
30	Pudukkottai	Pudukkottai	48	69	120
31	Perambalur			21	60
32	Madurai	Madurai	100	78	144
33	Mayiladuthurai			59	63
34	Ranipet			168	120
35	Ramanathapuram			111	108
36	Virudhunagar	Sivakasi	48	171	143
37	Viluppuram			102	108
38	Vellore	Vellore	60	57	63
Total			1373	3842	7604

== Seats and Alliances ==
=== TVK-led Alliance ===
TVK-led Alliance
Party	Flag	Symbol	Leader	Seats
Tamilaga Vettri Kazhagam			C. Joseph Vijay	TBD
Indian National Congress			Manickam Tagore	TBD
Marumalarchi Dravida Munnetra Kazhagam			Vaiko	TBD
Viduthalai Chiruthaigal Katchi			Thol. Thirumavalavan	TBD
Indian Union Muslim League			K.M. Kader Mohideen	TBD

=== DMK-led Alliance ===
DMK-led Alliance
Party	Flag	Symbol	Leader	Seat
Dravida Munnetra Kazhagam			M. K. Stalin	TBD
Desiya Murpokku Dravida Kazhagam			Premalatha Vijayakant	TBD
Makkal Needhi Maiam			Kamal Haasan	TBD
Manithaneya Makkal Katchi			M. H. Jawahirullah	TBD
Kongunadu Makkal Desia Katchi			E. R. Eswaran	TBD
Social Democratic Party of India			V. M. S. Mohamed Mubarak	TBD
Manithaneya Jananayaga Katchi			M. Thamimun Ansari	TBD
Tamil Nadu Peasants and Workers Party			Pon. Kumar	TBD
Tamil Nadu Kongu Ilaingar Peravai			U. Thaniyarasu	TBD
Tamizhar Desam Katchi			K. K. Selvakumar	TBD
Adhi Tamilar Peravai			R. Adhiyaman	TBD
Mukkulathor Pulipadai			Karunas	TBD
Makkal Viduthalai Katchi			K. Murugavelrajan	TBD
Dravida Vettri Kazhagam			C. E. Sathya	TBD
Samathuva Makkal Kazhagam			Ernavoor Narayanan	TBD
Jananayaga Muslim Makkal Party			Dr.M.F. Tamim	TBD

=== AIADMK-Led Alliance ===
AIADMK-led Alliance
Party	Flag	Symbol	Leader	Seats contested
All India Anna Dravida Munnetra Kazhagam			Edappadi K. Palaniswami	TBD
Bharatiya Janata Party			Nainar Nagendran	TBD
Pattali Makkal Katchi			Anbumani Ramadoss	TBD
Amma Makkal Munnettra Kazagam			T. T. V. Dhinakaran	TBD
South India Forward Bloc			K.C. Thirumanan	TBD
Puthiya Needhi Katchi			A. C. Shanmugam	TBD
Indhiya Jananayaga Katchi			T. R. Paarivendhar	TBD
All India Moovendar Munnani Kazhagam			N. Sethuraman	TBD
Tamil Maanila Bahujan Samaj			Porkodi Armstrong	TBD
Singa Tamizhar Munnetra Kazhagam			R.V. Bharthan	TBD
Moovendar Munnetra Kazhagam			Sridhar Vandayar	TBD
Pasumpon Desiya Kazhagam			Jothi Muthuramalingam	TBD
Perunthalaivar Makkal Katchi			N. R. Dhanapalan	TBD
Puratchi Bharatham Katchi			M. Jaganmoorthy	TBD

== Results ==
Date	Municipal Corporation	Government before	Government after
TBD	Greater Chennai	DMK	TBD
TBD	Tambaram	DMK	TBD
TBD	Avadi	DMK	TBD
TBD	Kancheepuram	DMK	TBD
TBD	Coimbatore	DMK	TBD
TBD	Tiruchirappalli	DMK	TBD
TBD	Madurai	DMK	TBD
TBD	Salem	DMK	TBD
TBD	Tiruppur	DMK	TBD
TBD	Erode	DMK	TBD
TBD	Tirunelveli	DMK	TBD
TBD	Vellore	DMK	TBD
TBD	Thoothukudi	DMK	TBD
TBD	Hosur	DMK	TBD
TBD	Karur	DMK	TBD
TBD	Thanjavur	DMK	TBD
TBD	Nagercoil	DMK	TBD
TBD	Cuddalore	DMK	TBD
TBD	Kumbakonam	DMK	TBD
TBD	Dindigul	DMK	TBD
TBD	Sivakasi	DMK	TBD
TBD	Pudukkottai	Newly formed	TBD
TBD	Karaikudi	Newly formed	TBD
TBD	Namakkal	Newly formed	TBD
TBD	Tiruvannamalai	Newly formed	TBD

Urban Local Body results
Local Body/Party	Corporation councilor	Municipal councilor	Town panchayat ward members
TVK	0	0	0
DMK	0	0	0
AIADMK	0	0	0
BJP	0	0	0
INC	0	0	0
CPI(M)	0	0	0
CPI	0	0	0
VCK	0	0	0
DMDK	0	0	0
We the leaders	0	0	0
Others	0	0	0
Independent	0	0	0
Total seats faced election	0	0	0

Rural Local Body results
Local Body/Party	District Panchayat Chairmen	District Panchayat Councillors	Panchayat Union Chairmen	Panchayat Union Councillor
TVK	0	0	0	0
DMK	0	0	0	0
AIADMK	0	0	0	0
BJP	0	0	0	0
INC	0	0	0	0
CPI(M)	0	0	0	0
CPI	0	0	0	0
VCK	0	0	0	0
DMDK	0	0	0	0
We the leaders	0	0	0	0
Others	0	0	0	0
Independent	0	0	0	0
Total seats faced election	0	0	0	0

- Corporation Mayor, Chairman of Municipalities and Town panchayat will be elected through in-direct election method.

i.e. The elected Councillors of the local bodies will elect the heads of the urban local bodies among-st themselves after the results.

== Greater Chennai Municipal Corporation ==
The seats of the Mayor, Deputy Mayor and the Greater Chennai Corporation Council had been vacant since 2016. The Greater Chennai Corporation went to polling on 19 February 2022, to elect 200 councillors to represent the city's 200 wards; the councillors choose one amongst themselves as the mayor of Chennai, a historically significant, coveted office. The Government of Tamil Nadu had announced that the Mayor's seat has been reserved for a Scheduled Caste woman this time. The election results were announced on 22 February 2022 by the Tamil Nadu State Election Commission. The Dravida Munnetra Kazhagam (DMK) won 153 out of the total 200 wards in Chennai, with the other parties in its Secular Progressive Alliance winning 25 more seats—13 for Indian National Congress, four for Communist Party of India – Marxist (CPI-M), four for Viduthalai Chiruthaigal Katchi (VCK), two for Marumalarchi Dravida Munnetra Kazhagam (MDMK), one each for Communist Party of India (CPI) and Indian Union Muslim League (IUML). The All India Anna Dravida Munnetra Kazhagam (AIADMK) won 15 seats. The Bharatiya Janata Party (BJP), the ruling party of the Union Government of India, won one seat. The Amma Makkal Munnettra Kazagam (AMMK) also won a seat. Aside parties, five independent candidates won in their respective wards. The councillors formally elected the Mayor and the Deputy Mayor on 4 March 2022. Having secured an absolute majority, the DMK's mayoral candidate Priya Rajan became the 46th Mayor of Chennai, unopposed. She is the youngest mayor in Chennai's history (aged 28), and the first Dalit woman to hold the office.

== Tambaram City Municipal Corporation ==
DMK and its allies in the Secular Progressive Alliance, won 54 wards out of total 70 wards in the Tambaram City Municipal Corporation election. The DMK won 50 and its allies 4.

== Avadi City Municipal Corporation ==
DMK and its allies in the Secular Progressive Alliance, won 39 wards out of total 48 wards in the Avadi City Municipal Corporation election. The DMK won 35 and its allies 4.

== Coimbatore Municipal Corporation ==
DMK and its allies in the Secular Progressive Alliance, won 96 wards out of total 100 wards in the Coimbatore Municipal Corporation election. The DMK won 76 and its allies 20. Among the allies of DMK, Congress won nine, CPI(M) and CPI - four each, and MDMK three wards. The incumbent ruling party in the Coimbtore corporation council, AIADMK won three seats. Social Democratic Party of India won 1 ward.

== Madurai Municipal Corporation ==
DMK and its allies in the Secular Progressive Alliance, won 80 wards out of total 100 wards in the Madurai Municipal Corporation election. The DMK won 67 and its allies 13.

== Tiruchirappalli City Municipal Corporation ==
DMK and its allies in the Secular Progressive Alliance, won 56 wards out of total 65 wards in the Tiruchirappalli City Municipal Corporation election. The DMK won 49 and its allies 7.

== Salem City Municipal Corporation ==
The Salem City Municipal Corporation went to polling on 19 February 2022 for the seats of the mayor, deputy mayor and the Salem Corporation Council, alongside 20 other municipal corporations of Tamil Nadu, to elect 60 councillors to represent the city's 60 wards. The election results were announced on 22 February 2022 by the Tamil Nadu State Election Commission. The Dravida Munnetra Kazhagam (DMK) won 48 out of the total 60 wards in Salem, with the other parties in its Secular Progressive Alliance winning 2 seats by Indian National Congress. The All India Anna Dravida Munnetra Kazhagam (AIADMK) won 7 seats. 3 independent candidates won in their respective wards. Having secured an absolute majority, the DMK councillors will formally elect the Mayor and the Deputy Mayor on 4 March 2022.
