= 2022 Tamil Nadu local elections =

2022 Tamil Nadu urban civic body elections
- 19 February 2022
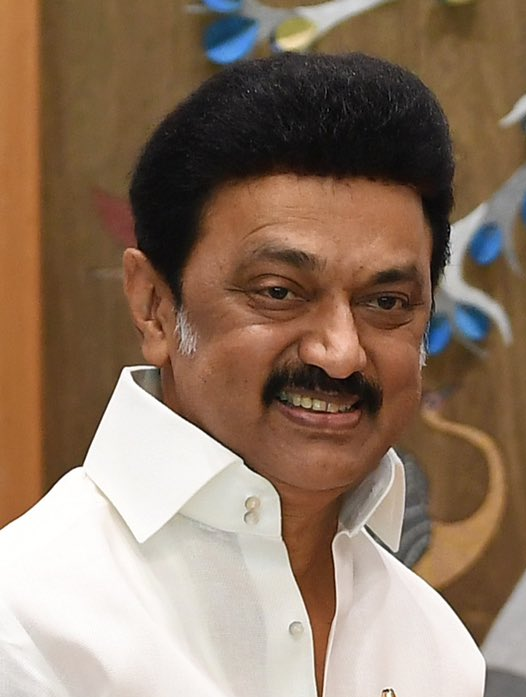

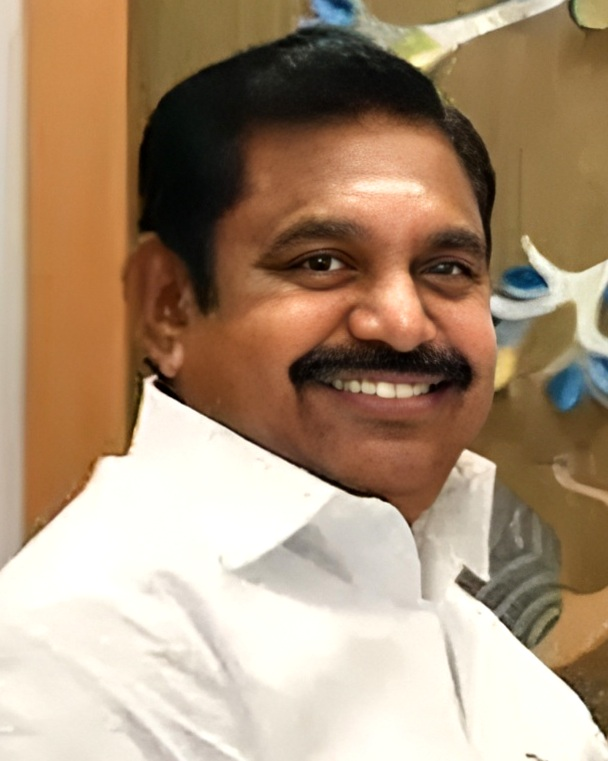
	First party	Second party
Leader	M. K. Stalin	Edappadi K. Palaniswami
Party	DMK	AIADMK
Alliance	SPA	AIADMK+
Leader since	2017	2017
Seats won	2360	638

The 2022 Tamil Nadu urban local body elections to the local government in Tamil Nadu were held in urban areas in February 2022. The Greater Chennai Corporation, alongside 20 other municipal corporations of Tamil Nadu, went to polling on 19 February 2022 to elect councillors to represent the wards in the respective cities; the elected councillors chose a mayor from amongst themselves.

== Seats ==
S.No	District	Corporation councilor	Municipal councilor	Town panchayat ward members
1	Ariyalur		39	30
2	Erode	60	102	628
3	Cuddalore	45	180	222
4	Karur	48	75	123
5	Kallakurichi		72	81
6	Kanyakumari	52	99	828
7	Kanchipuram	50	57	48
8	Krishnagiri	45	33	93
9	Coimbatore	100	198	513
10	Sivaganga		117	167
11	Chengalpattu	70	108	99
12	Chennai	200		
13	Salem	60	165	474
14	Thanjavur	99	60	299
15	Dharmapuri		33	159
16	Dindigul	48	75	363
17	Tiruchirappalli	65	120	216
18	Tirunelveli	55	69	273
19	Tirupathur		126	45
20	Tiruppur	60	147	233
21	Tiruvannamalai		123	150
22	Tiruvallur	48	141	129
23	Tiruvarur		111	105
24	Thoothukudi	60	81	261
25	Tenkasi		180	260
26	Theni		177	336
27	Nagapattinam		57	60
28	Namakkal		153	294
29	Nilgiris		108	186
30	Pudukkottai		69	120
31	Perambalur		21	60
32	Madurai	100	78	144
33	Mayiladuthurai		59	63
34	Ranipet		168	120
35	Ramanathapuram		111	108
36	Virudhunagar	48	171	143
37	Viluppuram		102	108
38	Vellore	60	57	63
Total		1373	3842	7604

== Election results ==
Counting of votes commenced on 22 February 2022. Official results were published on Tamil Nadu State Election Commission website.

Date	Municipal corporation	Government before	Government after
19 February 2022	Coimbatore City Municipal Corporation	All India Anna Dravida Munnetra Kazhagam	Dravida Munnetra Kazhagam
19 February 2022	Dindigul City Municipal Corporation	All India Anna Dravida Munnetra Kazhagam	Dravida Munnetra Kazhagam
19 February 2022	Erode City Municipal Corporation	All India Anna Dravida Munnetra Kazhagam	Dravida Munnetra Kazhagam
19 February 2022	Greater Chennai Corporation	All India Anna Dravida Munnetra Kazhagam	Dravida Munnetra Kazhagam
19 February 2022	Madurai Municipal Corporation	All India Anna Dravida Munnetra Kazhagam	Dravida Munnetra Kazhagam
19 February 2022	Salem City Municipal Corporation	All India Anna Dravida Munnetra Kazhagam	Dravida Munnetra Kazhagam
19 February 2022	Thanjavur City Municipal Corporation	All India Anna Dravida Munnetra Kazhagam	Dravida Munnetra Kazhagam
19 February 2022	Thoothukkudi City Municipal Corporation	All India Anna Dravida Munnetra Kazhagam	Dravida Munnetra Kazhagam
19 February 2022	Tiruchirappalli City Municipal Corporation	All India Anna Dravida Munnetra Kazhagam	Dravida Munnetra Kazhagam
19 February 2022	Tirunelveli City Municipal Corporation	All India Anna Dravida Munnetra Kazhagam	Dravida Munnetra Kazhagam
19 February 2022	Tiruppur City Municipal Corporation	All India Anna Dravida Munnetra Kazhagam	Dravida Munnetra Kazhagam
19 February 2022	Vellore Corporation	All India Anna Dravida Munnetra Kazhagam	Dravida Munnetra Kazhagam
19 February 2022	Hosur City Municipal Corporation	did not exist	Dravida Munnetra Kazhagam
19 February 2022	Nagercoil Corporation	did not exist	Dravida Munnetra Kazhagam
19 February 2022	Avadi City Municipal Corporation	did not exist	Dravida Munnetra Kazhagam
19 February 2022	Kancheepuram City Municipal Corporation	did not exist	Dravida Munnetra Kazhagam
19 February 2022	Karur City Municipal Corporation	did not exist	Dravida Munnetra Kazhagam
19 February 2022	Cuddalore City Municipal Corporation	did not exist	Dravida Munnetra Kazhagam
19 February 2022	Sivakasi City Municipal Corporation	did not exist	Dravida Munnetra Kazhagam
19 February 2022	Tambaram City Municipal Corporation	did not exist	Dravida Munnetra Kazhagam
19 February 2022	Kumbakonam City Municipal Corporation	did not exist	Dravida Munnetra Kazhagam

== Greater Chennai Corporation results ==
2022 Chennai Municipal Corporation election Government SPA (DMK+) (178) DMK: 153 seats INC: 13 seats CPI(M): 4 seats VCK: 4 seats MDMK: 2 seats IUML: 1 seat CPI: 1 seat Opposition (22) AIADMK: 15 seats BJP: 1 seat AMMK: 1 seat Others (5) Independents: 5 seats

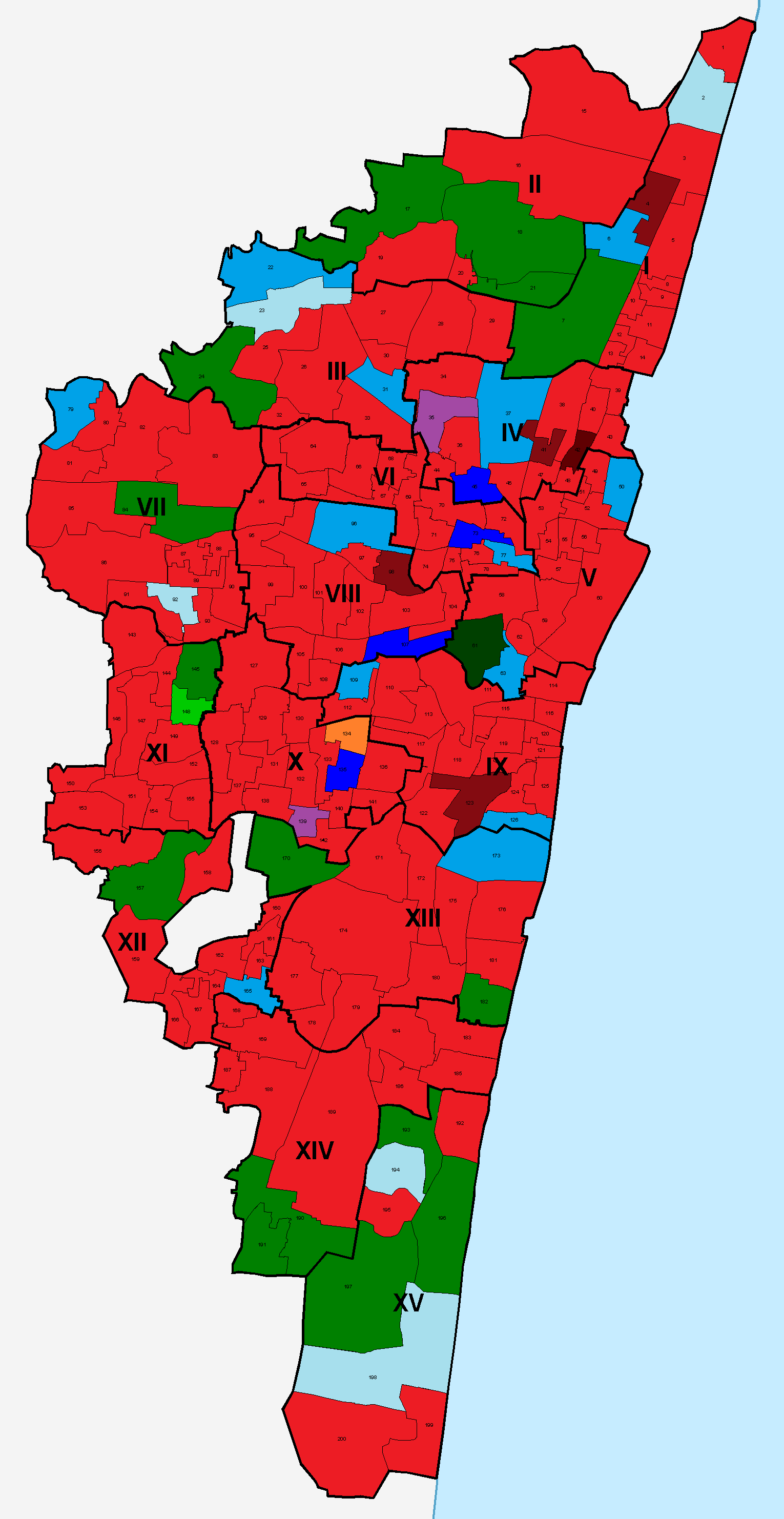
Map of Chennai showing corporation wards and winning parties

=== Chennai ===
The seats of the Mayor, Deputy Mayor and the Greater Chennai Corporation Council had been vacant since 2016. The Greater Chennai Corporation went to polling on 19 February 2022, to elect 200 councillors to represent the city's 200 wards; the councillors choose one amongst themselves as the mayor of Chennai, a historically significant, coveted office. The Government of Tamil Nadu had announced that the Mayor's seat has been reserved for a Scheduled Caste woman this time. The election results were announced on 22 February 2022 by the Tamil Nadu State Election Commission. The Dravida Munnetra Kazhagam (DMK) won 153 out of the total 200 wards in Chennai, with the other parties in its Secular Progressive Alliance winning 25 more seats—13 for Indian National Congress, four for Communist Party of India – Marxist (CPI-M), four for Viduthalai Chiruthaigal Katchi (VCK), two for Marumalarchi Dravida Munnetra Kazhagam (MDMK), one each for Communist Party of India (CPI) and Indian Union Muslim League (IUML). The All India Anna Dravida Munnetra Kazhagam (AIADMK) won 15 seats. The Bharatiya Janata Party (BJP), the ruling party of the Union Government of India, won one seat. The Amma Makkal Munnettra Kazagam (AMMK) also won a seat. Aside parties, five independent candidates won in their respective wards. The councillors formally elected the Mayor and the Deputy Mayor on 4 March 2022. Having secured an absolute majority, the DMK's mayoral candidate Priya Rajan became the 46th Mayor of Chennai, unopposed. She is the youngest mayor in Chennai's history (aged 28), and the first Dalit woman to hold the office.

== Coimbatore City Municipal Corporation results ==
2022 Coimbatore Municipal Corporation election Ruling Party (96) SPA (96) DMK: 76 wards INC: 9 wards CPIM: 4 wards CPI: 4 wards MDMK: 3 wards Opposition (4) AIADMK: 3 wards SDPI: 1 ward

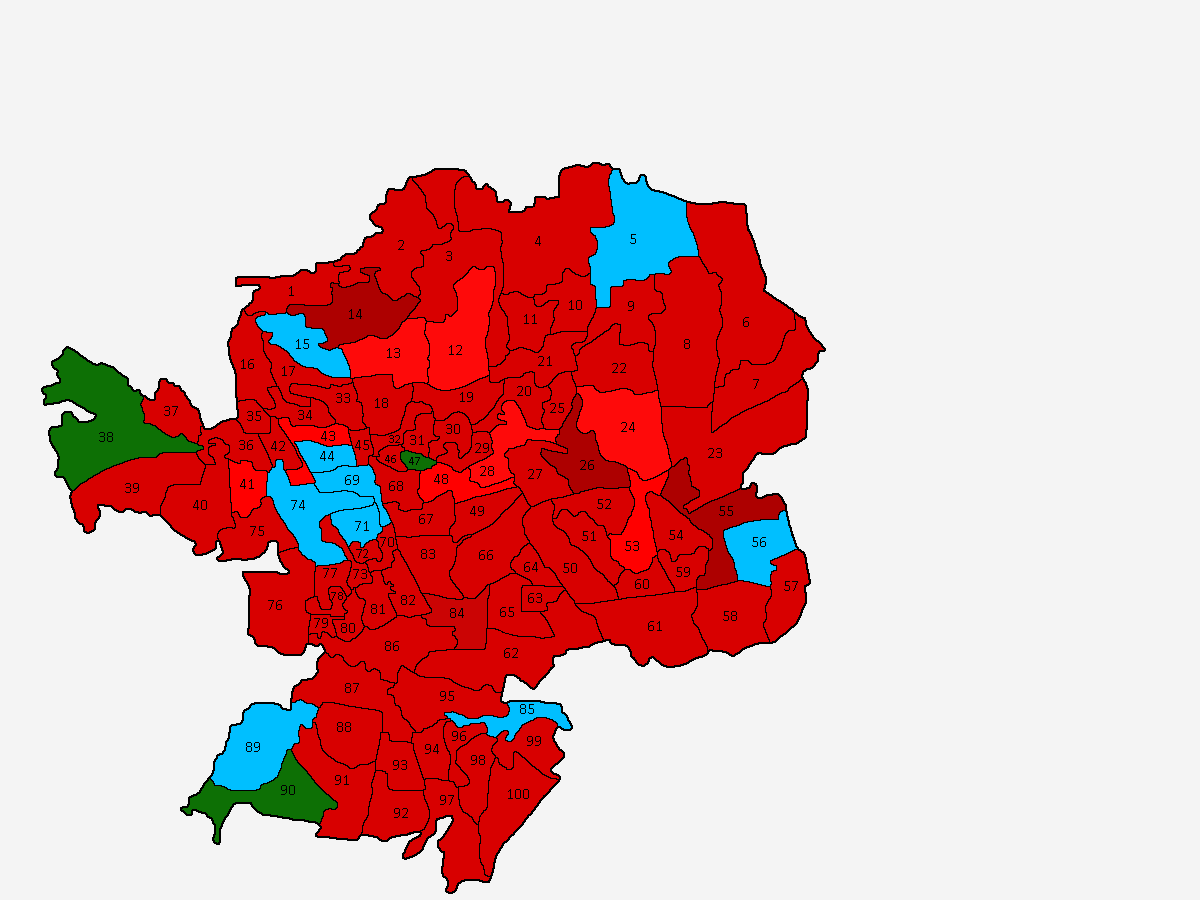
Coimbatore map showing Corporation wards and winning parties

DMK and its allies in the Secular Progressive Alliance, won 96 wards out of total 100 wards in the Coimbatore Municipal Corporation election. The DMK won 76 and its allies 20. Among the allies of DMK, Congress won nine, CPI(M) and CPI - four each, and MDMK three wards. The incumbent ruling party in the Coimbtore corporation council, AIADMK won three seats. Social Democratic Party of India won 1 ward.

=== Win percentage ===
The percentage of winning candidates from each parties in the election.

Parties	Municipal corporations	Municipality	Town panchayats
Dravida Munnetra Kazhagam	69.29%	61.41%	57.58%
All India Anna Dravida Munnetra Kazhagam	11.94%	16.60%	15.82%
Indian National Congress	5.31%	3.93%	4.83%
Communist Party of India	1.75%	1.1%	1.33%
Bharatiya Janata Party	1.60%	1.46%	3%
Communist Party of India	1%	0.5%	0.34%
Desiya Murpokku Dravida Kazhagam	0.0%	0.3%	0.3%
Bahujan Samaj Party	0.0%	0.08%	0.01%
Others	9.10%	14.62%	16.52%

=== Party-wise ===
Parties	Municipal corporations	Municipality	Town panchayats
Dravida Munnetra Kazhagam	952	2360	4389
All India Anna Dravida Munnetra Kazhagam	164	638	1206
Independent politician	73	381	980
Indian National Congress	73	151	368
Communist Party of India	24	41	101
Bharatiya Janata Party	22	56	230
Marumalarchi Dravida Munnetra Kazhagam	21	34	34
Viduthalai Chiruthaigal Katchi	16	26	51
Communist Party of India	13	19	26
Indian Union Muslim League	6	23	12
Pattali Makkal Katchi	5	48	73
Amma Makkal Munnettra Kazagam	3	33	66
Social Democratic Party of India	1	5	16
All India Forward Bloc	0	1	0
All India Majlis-E-Ittehadul Muslimeen	0	1	0
All India Samathuva Makkal Katchi	0	1	0
Bahujan Samaj Party	0	3	1
Communist Party of India (Marxist-Leninist)	0	0	1
Desiya Murpokku Dravida Kazhagam	0	12	23
Indians Victory Party	0	0	0
Indhiya Jananayaga Katchi	0	2	1
Janata Dal	0	1	0
Manithaneya Jananayaga Katchi	0	1	1
Manithaneya Makkal Katchi	0	4	13
Naam Tamilar Katchi	0	0	6
Nationalist Congress Party	0	0	1
Puthiya Tamilagam	0	1	3
Tamilaga Makkal Munnetra Kazhagam	0	0	1
Source:www.tnsec.tn.nic.in

== Salem City Municipal Corporation results ==
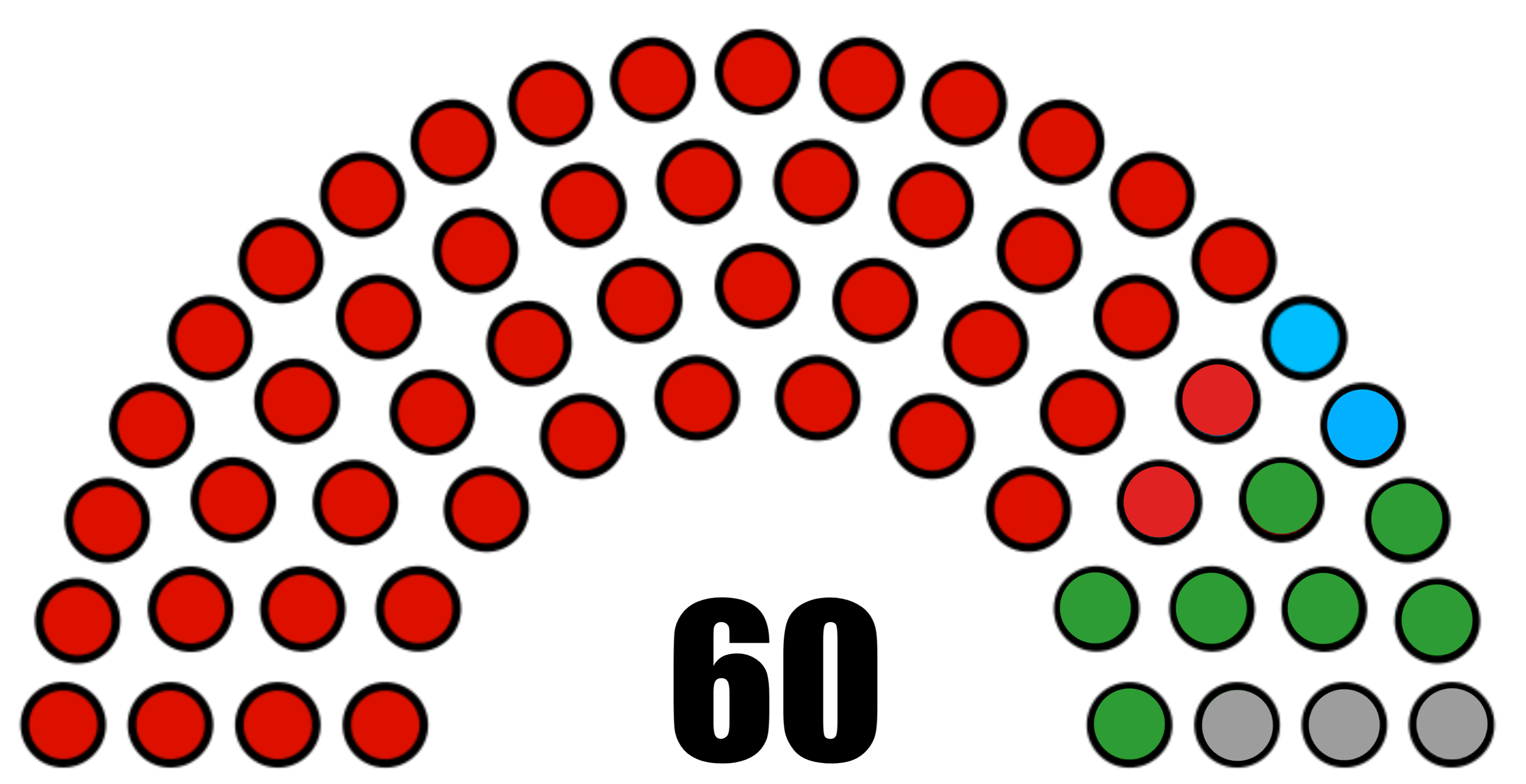
2022 Salem Municipal Corporation election Dravida Munnetra Kazhagam: 48 seats Indian National Congress: 2 seats All India Anna Dravida Munnetra Kazhagam: 7 seats Independent : 3 seats

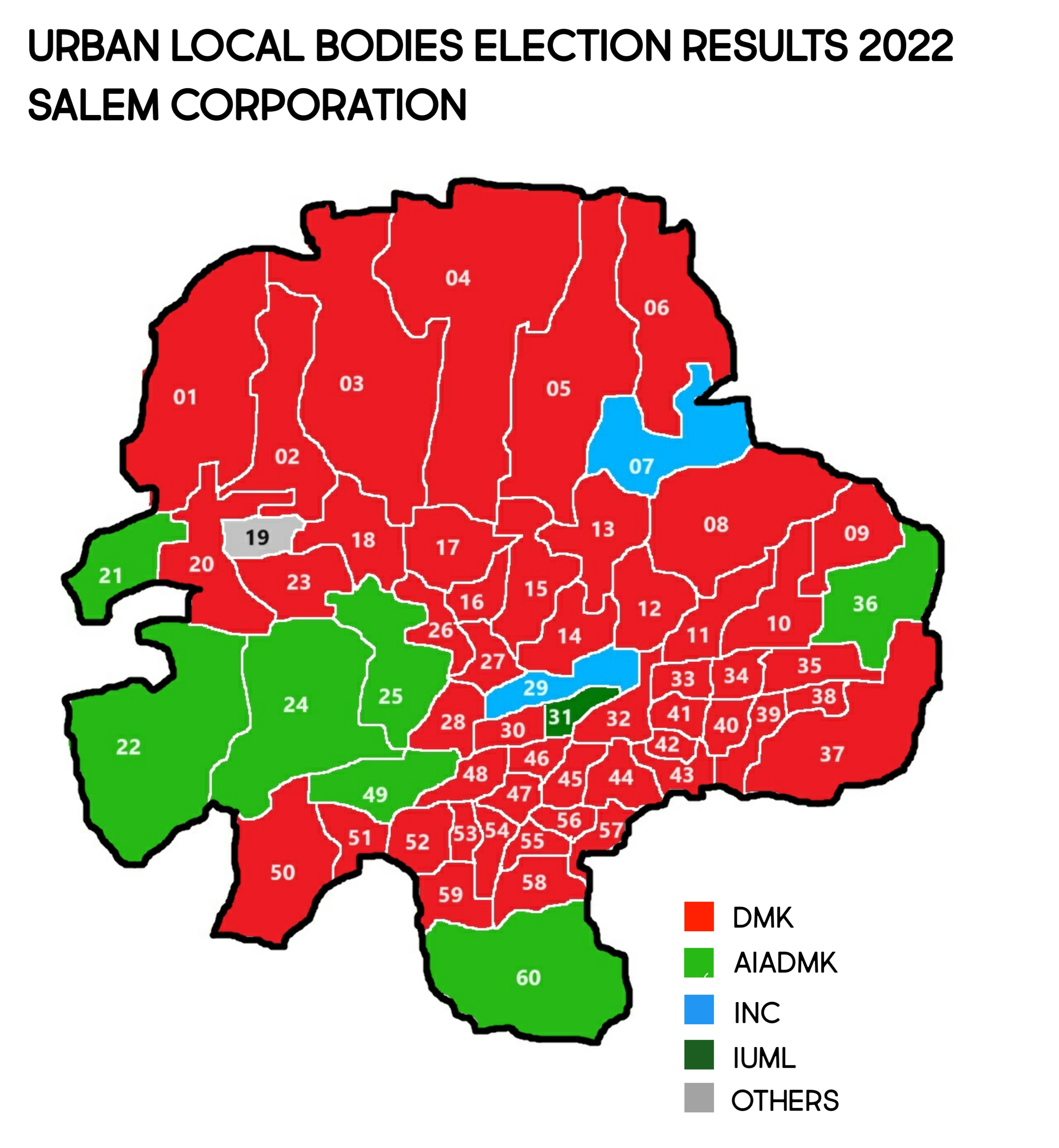
Map of Salem showing corporation wards and winning parties

The Salem City Municipal Corporation went to polling on 19 February 2022 for the seats of the mayor, deputy mayor and the Salem Corporation Council, alongside 20 other municipal corporations of Tamil Nadu, to elect 60 councillors to represent the city's 60 wards. The election results were announced on 22 February 2022 by the Tamil Nadu State Election Commission. The Dravida Munnetra Kazhagam (DMK) won 48 out of the total 60 wards in Salem, with the other parties in its Secular Progressive Alliance winning 2 seats by Indian National Congress. The All India Anna Dravida Munnetra Kazhagam (AIADMK) won 7 seats. 3 independent candidates won in their respective wards. Having secured an absolute majority, the DMK councillors will formally elect the Mayor and the Deputy Mayor on 4 March 2022.
