= 2022 Azamgarh by-election =

Local election in India

- 23 June 2022

Azamgarh constituency
- Turnout: 49.36% (▼8.26 pp)
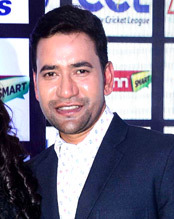

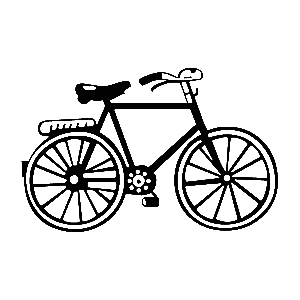

Candidate	Dinesh Lal Yadav 'Nirahua'	Dharmendra Yadav	Shah Alam
Party	BJP	SP	BSP
Popular vote	312,768	3,04,089	2,66,210
Percentage	34.39%	33.44%	29.27%
Swing	▲17.92	▲13.59	▲13.59
MP before election
Akhilesh Yadav
SP
Elected MP
Dinesh Lal Yadav
BJP

On 23 June 2022 a parliamentary by-election was held in Azamgarh Lok Sabha constituency. The election was won by BJP candidate Dinesh Lal Yadav 'Nirahua' who defeated Samajwadi Party candidate Dharmendra Yadav by a margin of 8,679 votes. The by-election occurred due to the resignation of sitting Samajwadi Party supremo Akhilesh Yadav after he was elected from Karhal Assembly constituency.

== Result ==
BJP won the seat after 13 years, which was typically considered a SP bastion. However, the margin of victory was 8,679 votes.

=== 2022 by election ===
Bye-Elections, 2022: Azamgarh
Party	Candidate	Votes	%	±%
BJP	Dinesh Lal Yadav	312,768	34.39	▼0.71
SP	Dharmendra Yadav	3,04,089	33.44	▼26.60
BSP	Shah Alam	2,66,210	29.27	New
NOTA	None of the Above	5,369	0.59	▼0.11
Independent	Rajiv Talwar	2,549	0.28	▲0.07
Majority		8,679	0.95	▼24.29
Turnout		9,09,654	49.36	▼8.20
BJP gain from SP		Swing		

== See also ==
- 2022 elections in India
