= Tamil Nadu State Election Commission =

State electoral regulator in India

- தமிழ்நாடு மாநில தேர்தல் ஆணையம்

State Election Commission Body overview
- Formed: 15 July 1994
- Jurisdiction: Tamil Nadu Local Bodies
- Headquarters: No.208/2, Jawaharlal Nehru Road, Opp. CMBT, Arumbakkam, Chennai 600 106
- State Election Commission Body executives: B. Jothi Nirmalasamy I.A.S. (R), Tamil Nadu State Election Commissioner; Thiru. K. Balasubramaniam, I.A.S.,, Secretary

The Tamil Nadu State Election Commission is an autonomous, independent Constitutional and Statutory authority of Tamil Nadu. It was formed under the Constitution of India as per the provisions of the 73rd and 74th Amendments Acts of 1992 on 15 July 1994. All Local Body elections of Tamil Nadu are conducted by this Commission.

== History ==
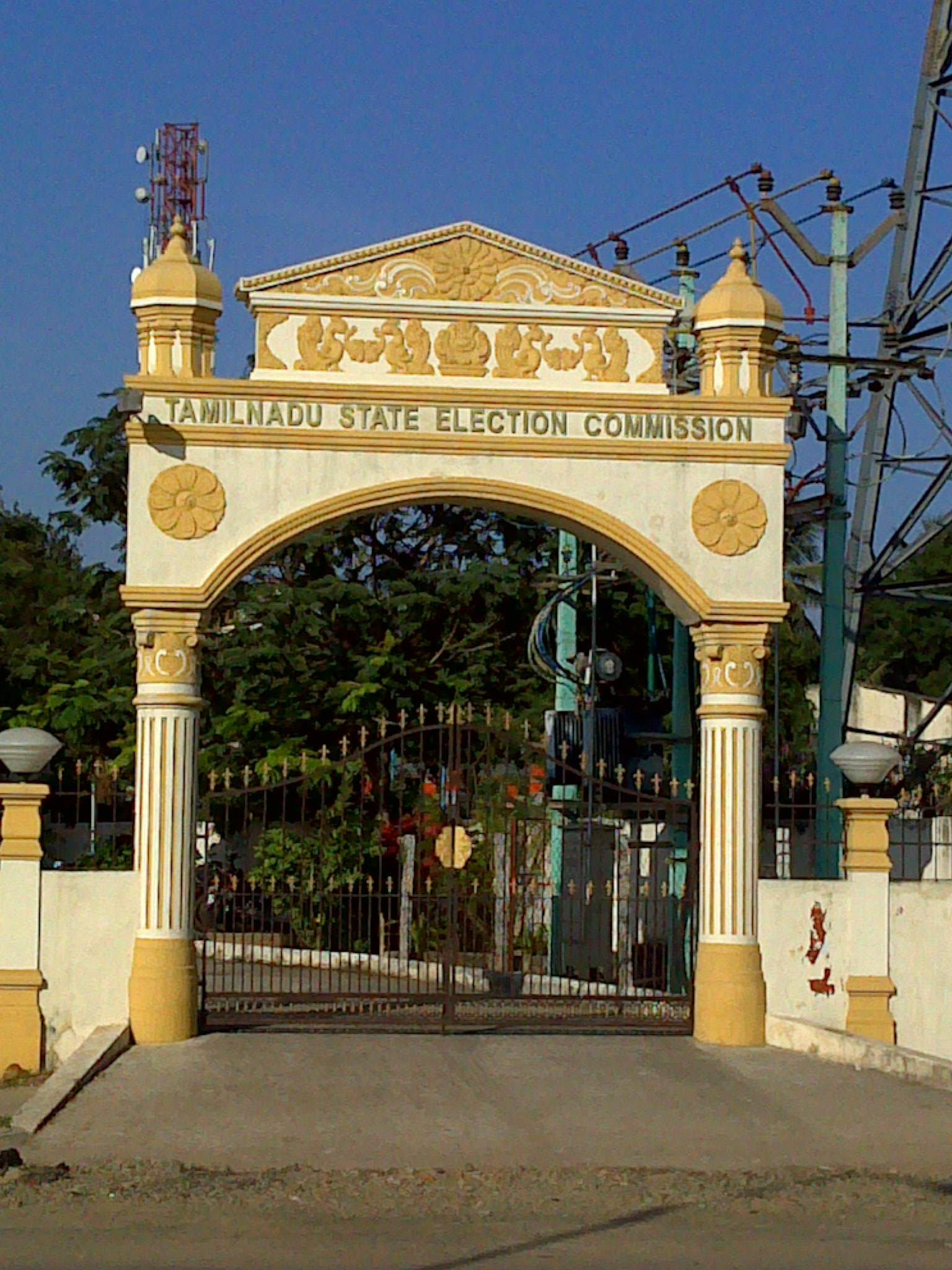
Entrance of Tamil Nadu State Election Commission, Chennai - 106

Tamil Nadu Panchayats Act, 1994 was enacted according to the 73rd and 74th Constitutional amendments of India in May 1994 which paved way for the creation of Tamil Nadu State Election Commission. But, the first election to the Local Bodies of Tamil Nadu was conducted in October 1996. Consecutive elections were then conducted in October 2001, October 2006, October 2011 successfully and December 2019 election held as partially.

== Structure ==
The Tamil Nadu State Election Commission is headed by a Tamil Nadu State Election Commissioner appointed by the Governor of Tamil Nadu. Tamil Nadu State Election Commissioner holds his term for two years which is eligible for reappointment for two terms. Usually, Tamil Nadu State Election Commissioners are appointed in the rank of Secretary to Govt. of Tamil Nadu. Currently, Tmt. B. Jothi Nirmalasamy, I.A.S.,(R) is the Tamil Nadu State Election Commissioner. Commissioner is assisted by a Secretary in the cadre of a senior IAS Officer and Officers and sufficient staff.

== Duties ==
Tamil Nadu State Election Commission, Chennai - 106

The conduct of elections to Rural and Urban bodies of Tamil Nadu are held by both direct and indirect elections. The sole controlling authority vests with the Tamil Nadu State Election Commission. Elections to the various posts are held by this commission by direct and indirect election.

Electoral rolls as per the electoral rolls of Tamil Nadu Legislative Assembly constituency are prepared by this commission. Polling stations are then identified based on the rolls. Followed by which is the notification for elections. Similar norms followed for the assembly elections are adhered here.

== See also ==
- Local Bodies in India
- Local Body Election in Tamil Nadu
- Local Bodies in Tamil Nadu
