= Chhindwara Municipal Corporation =

Local civic body in Madhya Pradesh, India

The Chhindwara Municipal Corporation is the civic body that governs Chhindwara city in the Indian state of Madhya Pradesh. 48 wards in city divided in 5 zones current mayor vikram ahake is responsible for the civic infrastructure and administration of the city. Chhindwara Municipal Corporation is headed by the Mayor of city and governed by the Commissioner.
