= Pudukkottai Municipal Corporation =

Headquarters of the Pudukkottai district

Pudukkottai City Municipal Corporation புதுக்கோட்டை மாநகராட்சி
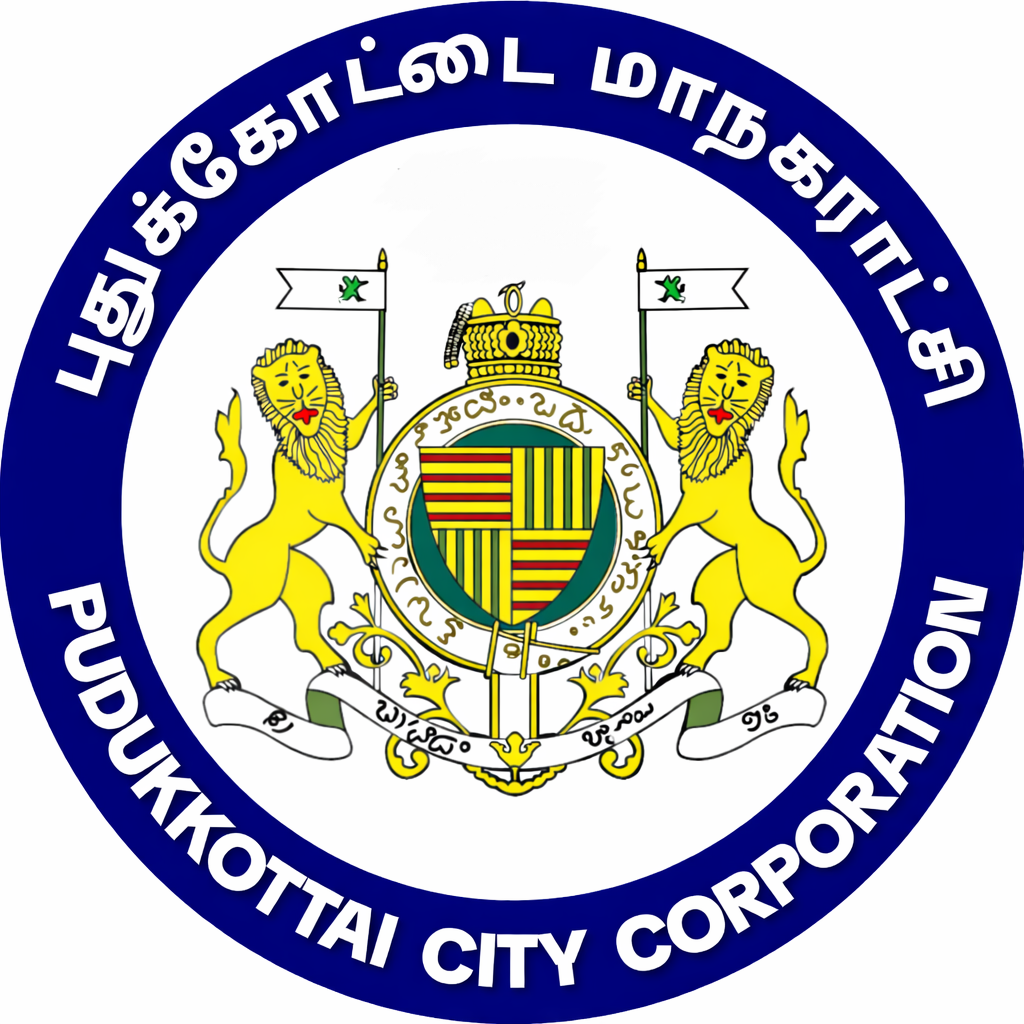

Type
- Type: Municipal Corporation of the Pudukkottai

History
- Founded: March 15, 2024; 2 years ago

Leadership
- Mayor: Mrs. S.Thilagavathy Senthil.
- Deputy Mayor: Mr. M.Liyakath Ali.
- Municipal Commissioner: Mr. M. Gandhiraj (B.Com., M.B.A.)
- District Collector: Mrs. M. Aruna, I.A.S.

Elections
- Next election: 2027

Meeting place
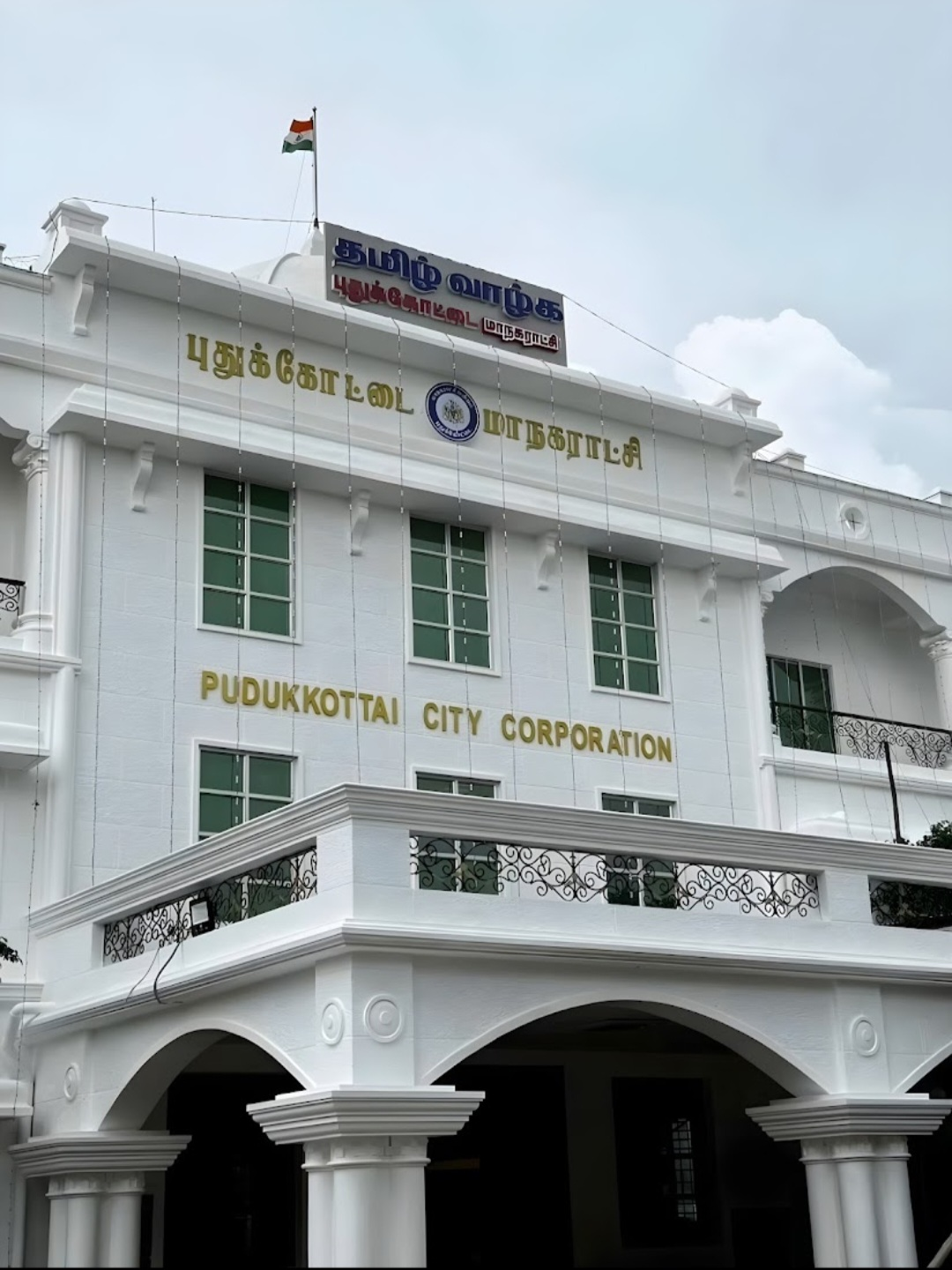
- City Municipal Corporation Office, Pudukkottai.

Website
- https://www.tnurbantree.tn.gov.in/pudukottai/

The Pudukkottai City Municipal Corporation is the municipal corporation which looks after the city administration of Pudukkottai in Tamil Nadu, India. The Tamil Nadu Government announced Pudukkottai as a New City Corporation on March 15 2024 by agglomerating 12 nearby village panchayats. This new city will be administered by a city Mayor. It is the 22nd municipal corporation of Tamil Nadu. It consists of a legislative and an executive body. The legislative body is headed by the city mayor while the executive body is headed by a Corporation Commissioner.

== History with Municipal administration and Politics ==
City Corporation Officials
Mayor	Mrs. Thilagavathi Senthil
Corporation Commissioner	Mr. Narayanan
Deputy Meyor	Mr. Liyakath Ali
Elected members
Member of Legislative Assembly	Mr. Muthuraja
Member of Parliament	Mr. Durai Vaiko

Among the municipalities in Tamil Nadu, the history of Pudukkottai municipality is 100 years old. During the British rule in the country, Pudukkottai became a princely state. Pudukkottai Municipality was formed in the year 1912 during the reign of the king Marthanda Bhairava Thondaiman.The city was constituted as a third-grade municipality in 1912 and promoted to first-grade during 1963, and selection-grade from 1998. The Municipality has 42 wards and there is an elected councillor for each of those wards.[22] The functions of the municipality are devolved into six departments: general administration/personnel, Engineering, Revenue, Public Health, city planning and Information Technology (IT). All these departments are under the control of a Municipal Commissioner who is the executive head.[23] The legislative powers are vested in a body of 42 members, one each from the 42 wards.[24] The legislative body is headed by an elected chairperson assisted by a deputy chairperson. On March 15 2024, the Tamil Nadu Government announced Pudukkottai as a New City Corporation by agglomerating 12 nearby village panchayats. This new city will be administered by a city Mayor. It is the 22nd municipal corporation of Tamil Nadu. The Panchayats to be merged into Pudukkottai Municipal Corporation are Vasavasal, Mullur, Thirukattalai, Thirumalairayasamutram, Kavinadu East, Kavinadu West, 9A Nathampannai, 9B Nathampannai completely and wards 1, 2, 3 in Thekkatur Panchayat, wards 3, 4 in Tiruvenkai Vasal and wards 7, 8, 9 wards in Vellanoor are being merged thereby expanding the Pudukkottai municipality with a population of 2.16 lakhs and an area of 121 square kilometers. The total revenue is estimated to rise to Rs 64.21 crore.

Pudukkottai City Municipal Corporation will have a Commissioner, a Mayor, a Council, a Standing Committee, and a Wards Committee for facilitating various works.

== Factors driving Pudukkottai City Municipal Corporation ==
This Municipal Corporation is driven by following factors:

- Population Growth.
- Increase in annual Income.
- Improvement of Roads.
- Providing drinking water.
- Improving landscape.
- Waste Management.
- Establishing industrial units.
- Providing sewage connection.
