= Tiruvannamalai Municipal Corporation =

Tiruvannamalai City Municipal Corporation

History
- Founded: August 12, 2024; 7 months ago

Leadership
- Municipal Commissioner: Gandhirajan

Website
- https://www.tnurbantree.tn.gov.in/tiruvannamalai/

Tiruvannamalai is the headquarters of the Tiruvannamalai district. The Tiruvannamalai municipality was established in 1886 during British times. It was promoted to a second-grade municipal municipality in 1959, first grade in 1974, selection grade in 1998 and special grade in 2008 and Municipal Corporation on August 12, 2024. Tiruvannamalai has been declared a New City Corporation by agglomerating 18 nearby village panchayats. This new city will be administered by a city Mayor as announced by government of Tamil Nadu.

== History and administration ==
Tiruvannamalai City Municipal Corporation in Tiruvannamalai district was formed on 15 March 2024 and is the 22nd municipal corporation of Tamil Nadu. Tiruvannamalai City Municipal Corporation will include 18 panchayats adjacent to the town and its limit will be extended as announced by government of Tamil Nadu. Along with Thiruvannamalai municipality, the panchayats of Venkikal, Chinnakangeyanur, Kilnachipattu, Nochimalai, Enthal, Thaenmathur, Kilikacharapattu, Upoorkavu, Chavalpoondi, Nallavanpalayam, Kananthampoondi, Anaiparanthan, Adiyenthal, Adi Annamalai, Devanendal, Adaiyur, Durgai Namiyenthal, Malappambadi and areas of Adimalai Protected Forest are included. and the Tiruvannamalai Corporation is formed with these mentioned areas.

Tiruvannamalai City Municipal Corporation will be having a Commissioner, a Mayor, a Council, a Standing Committee, and a Wards Committee for facilitating various works.

== Factors driving Tiruvannamalai City Municipal Corporation ==
This Municipal Corporation is driven by following factors:

- Population Growth.
- Increase in annual Income.
- Improvement of Roads.
- Providing drinking water.
- Improving landscape.
- Waste Management.
- Establishing industrial units.
- Providing sewage connection.
