= Hosur City Municipal Corporation =

13th biggest Municipal Corporation of Tamilnadu

Type
- Type: Municipal Corporation of the Hosur

History
- Founded: February 13, 2019; 7 years ago

Leadership
- Mayor: Thiru. S. A. Sathya DMK
- Deputy Mayor: Thiru. C. Anandaiah DMK
- Corporation Commissioner: Thiru. Mohammed Shabeer Alam IAS
- City Health Officer: Dr. Ajeetha MBBS, MD

Structure
- Seats: 45
- Political groups: Government (22) SPA (22): DMK (21); INC (1); Opposition (17): AIADMK (16); BJP (1); Others (6): Independent

Elections
- Last election: 2022
- Next election: 2027

Motto
- Clean city Green city

Meeting place
- Hosur Municipal Corporation office

Website
- Official website

Hosur City Municipal Corporation is the civic body governing city of industrial hub Hosur in Tamil Nadu state of India. It was the 13th Municipal corporation in Tamilnadu established on 13 February 2019. It is headed by a Mayor, who presides over a Deputy mayor, 45 councillors who represents over 45 wards of the city, and it has adjoined with Mathigiri town panchayat, Zuzuvadi, Chennathur, Avalapalli and Mookandapalli village panchayat. The annual tax revenue of the corporation is 102.41 crore rupees. Hosur is one of the major industrial city in Tamil Nadu and had a population of 345,354 with an area of 72.41 km².

== History and administration ==
Hosur town was constituted as Selection Grade Town Panchayat in 1962 and then upgraded to Second Grade Municipality in 1992 and to Selection Grade Municipality in 1998. In 2011, vide GO. No. 127 dated 8 September 2011 town panchayat of Mathigiri and village panchayats of Zuzuvadi, Mookandapalli, Avalapalli, and Chennathur were included in Hosur Municipality and upgraded as Special Grade municipality.

On 13 February 2019, Hosur Municipality was upgraded to Municipal Corporation by former Chief Minister of TamilNadu Edappadi K. Palaniswami. and becomes one of the 21 municipal corporations in Tamil Nadu. It was the first corporation to be made without a district's headquarters.

At present Hosur corporation has adjoined with Mathigiri town panchayat, Zuzuvadi, Avalapalli, Chennathur, and Mookandapalli village panchayat. In April 2022, plans to expand the city limit up to 740 square kilometers were announced.

Hosur Town Panchayat (Begapalli, Nallur, Onnaivadi, Kothakondapalli, Chennasandiram [Visawanathapuram (Part)], Thorapalli Agraharam [Kumdhepalli, Gandhi Nagar, Ellamma Kothur (Part)], Perandapalli, Moranapalli (Shoolagiri Town Panchayat) soon to be annexed to Hosur Municipal Corporation.

== Election ==
The seats of the Mayor, Deputy Mayor and the corporation council of Hosur Municipal Corporation have been vacant since 2016. As part of the 2022 Tamil Nadu urban civic body elections. Hosur Corporation went to polling on 19 February 2022, alongside 20 other municipal corporations of Tamil Nadu, to elect 45 councillors to represent the city's 45 wards; the councillors will choose one amongst themselves as the Mayor of Hosur Corporation. The election results were announced on 22 February 2022 by the Tamil Nadu State Election Commission. Dravida Munnetra Kazhagam (DMK) won 21 out of the total 45 wards in Hosur, with the other parties in its Secular Progressive Alliance winning 1 more seat—1 for Indian National Congress. All India Anna Dravida Munnetra Kazhagam (AIADMK) won 16 seats. Bharatiya Janata Party (BJP), the ruling party of the Union Government of India, won 1 seat. Aside parties, six independent candidates won in their respective wards.

== List of officials ==
=== Mayors ===
Council (Term)	No.	Portrait	Name	Term		Party
Council (Term)	No.	Portrait	Name	Start	End	
1st (2022 — 2027)	1		S.A. Sathya	4 March 2022	Incumbent	DMK

=== Deputy Mayors ===
Council (Term)	No.	Portrait	Name	Term		Party
Council (Term)	No.	Portrait	Name	Start	End	
1st (2022 — 2027)	1		C Anandhaiya	4 March 2022	Incumbent	DMK

=== City Councils ===
Council (Term)	Term		Government		Opposition	
Council (Term)	Start	End	Parties	Seats	Parties	Seats
1st (2022 — 2027)	4 March 2022	Incumbent	DMK+	22 / 45	AIADMK+	17 / 45

== Zones ==
Zones
Hosur East	Hosur West	Hosur North	Hosur South
Wards
45

Commissioner
Mohammed Shabeer Alam

IAS

Mayor
S.A.Sathya

DMK

Deputy Mayor
C.Anandhaiah

DMK

Members of HCMC wards
45

== See also ==
- List of municipal corporations in Tamil Nadu
- List of municipal corporations in India
