= Namakkal Municipal Corporation =

Indian civic governing body

Type
- Type: Municipal Corporation of the Namakkal

History
- Founded: March 15, 2024; 23 months ago

Leadership
- Mayor: D.Kalanithi
- Deputy Mayor: S.Boopathi
- Municipal Commissioner: K.Sivakumar
- District Collector: Durgamoorthi I.A.S

Website
- https://www.tnurbantree.tn.gov.in/namakkal/

Namakkal Municipal Corporation is the civic body governing city of Namakkal in Tamil Nadu state of India. It is one of the 25 Municipal corporation in Tamil Nadu, and was established on 15 March 2024. It will be headed by a mayor, who presides over a deputy mayor and will be administrated by City Commissioner.

== History and administration ==
Namakkal was constituted as a municipality and was upgraded to a Grade II Municipality in 1973, to Selection Grade in 1988, to a special grade in 2013, and City Corporation in 2024. The functions of the city corporation are divided into six departments: general administration/personnel, Engineering, Revenue, Public Health, city planning and Information Technology (IT).

On 15 March 2024, Namakkal Municipality was upgraded to Municipal Corporation by Chief minister of Tamil Nadu M.K. Stalin and became one of the 25 municipal corporations in Tamil Nadu. It was the first corporation to be made in the Namakkal District.

== Factors ==
Namakkal Municipal Corporation is driven by:

- Population growth
- Increase in annual income
- Improvement of roads
- Providing drinking water
- Improving landscape
- Waste management
- Establishing industrial units
- Providing sewage connection
