= Nagercoil Municipal Corporation =

14th Biggest Corporation of Tamilnadu

Nagercoil Corporation நாகர்கோவில் மாநகராட்சி Nākarkōvil Mānakarāṭci
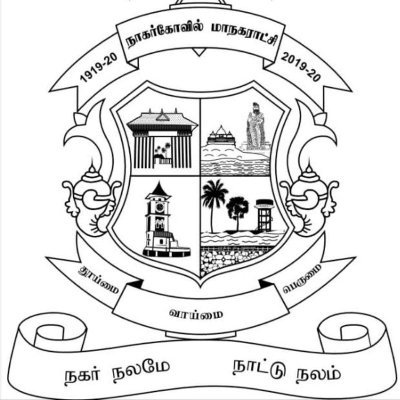
- Emblem of the Nagercoil Corporation.

Type
- Type: Municipal corporation of the Kanniyakumari District

History
- Founded: February 14, 2019; 7 years ago

Leadership
- Mayor: Tmt. Mary Princy, DMK
- Commissioner: R. Ishwarya, IAS
- District Collector: M. Prathap, IAS

Structure
- Seats: 52
- Political groups: Government (Alliance) (24): SPA (24); DMK (24); Opposition (26): BJP (11); AIADMK (7); SSJVA (8); INC (7); MDMK (1); Others (2): IND (2)

Elections
- Last election: 19 February 2022
- Next election: 2027

Meeting place
- Kalaivanar Maaligai, Balamore Road, Nagercoil.

Website
- www.tnurbantree.tn.gov.in/nagercoil/

Nagercoil Corporation is located in Kanniyakumari district. Nagercoil is the administrative headquarters of Kanniyakumari district and it is located in southern Tamil Nadu. The corporation is located 18 km north of Kanyakumari. Nagercoil Corporation is a forum with 52 members. At present Kottar, Vadasery and Vetturnimadam are the important places in Nagercoil Corporation. The annual tax revenue of this corporation is 81 crore rupees.

== History ==
Nagercoil Municipality was established in 1920 during the reign of the Travancore State and was upgraded to a first grade municipality in 1947. Following the States Reorganisation Act of 1956, Kanniyakumari district was merged with Madras State (present-day Tamil Nadu), and Nagercoil was classified as a second-grade municipality. As the town's population and revenue grew, it was upgraded to a first-grade municipality in 1961, followed by an upgrade to selection grade on 12 October 1978, and special grade status on 30 May 1988. On 14 February 2019, the municipality was formally upgraded to a municipal corporation by the then Chief Minister of Tamil Nadu, Edappadi K. Palaniswami.

== Administration ==
The elected councillors of the city appoint, from among themselves, the Mayor and Deputy Mayor who preside over 7 general committees and 4 ward committees. These committees meet periodically to deliberate on specific issues. The executive wing is headed by the Commissioner. In addition, there are deputy commissioners, various heads of departments and 15 zonal officers.

=== Administrative Zones ===
The Nagercoil Municipal Corporation consists of 52 wards, which have been grouped into 15 divisions, centred at their respective division offices. These divisions are further grouped into zones.

== Elections ==
The seats of the Mayor, Deputy Mayor and the Corporation Council of Nagercoil had been vacant since 2016. As part of the 2022 Tamil Nadu urban civic body elections, polling was held on 19 February 2022, alongside 20 other municipal corporations of Tamil Nadu, to elect 52 councillors to represent the city's 52 wards. The election results were announced on 22 February 2022 by the Tamil Nadu State Election Commission. The Dravida Munnetra Kazhagam (DMK) won 24 out of the total 52 wards in Nagercoil, with the other parties in its Secular Progressive Alliance winning 8 more seats—7 for Indian National Congress, 1 for Marumalarchi Dravida Munnetra Kazhagam (MDMK). The All India Anna Dravida Munnetra Kazhagam (AIADMK) won 7 seats. The Bharatiya Janata Party (BJP), the ruling party of the Union Government of India, won 11 seats. Aside parties, two independent candidates won in their respective wards. In the subsequent indirect elections, R. Mahesh of the DMK was elected the first Mayor of the Nagercoil Municipal Corporation.

== Important information ==
Area sq.km
61.36 sq.km
Population
2021 Estimates to		6,22,759	
Zones
East Zone Thiru.B.Selva Kumar	West Zone Tmt.G.Augustina Kohilavani	South Zone Thiru. Dr.P.Muthuraman	North Zone Thiru. I.Jawahar
Corporators
52
Working teams
Tax and Found Team
Work Team
Plan Team
Welfare Team
Education Team
Calculation team

== Administrative Areas ==
Covering an area of 61.36 km^{2}, Nagercoil Corporation consisted of former Nagercoil village, Vadiveeswaram village, Vadasery village and Neendakarai village. Currently, the Asaripallam Town Panchayat is annexed to the Nagercoil municipality. The corporation functions as a forum with 52 members.

== Wards ==
S.No	Ward Member	Party
1		
2		
3		
4		
5		
6		
7		
8		
9		
10		
11		
12		
13		
14		
