= Thanjavur Municipal Corporation =

Local authority in India

Thanjavur City Municipal Corporation

Type
- Type: Municipal Corporation of the Thanjavur

History
- Founded: 10 April 2014; 12 years ago

Leadership
- Mayor: Thiru. Sun.Ramanathan, DMK
- Deputy mayor: Dr. Anjugam Boopathy, DMK
- Commissioner: Thiru. K.Saravanakumar
- District Collector: Thiru. Dinesh Ponraj Oliver, IAS

Elections
- Last election: 2022
- Next election: 2027

Website
- thanjavurcorporation.org

Thanjavur City Municipal Corporation is a civic body that governs Thanjavur city, India. It has been awarded as the Best municipal corporation in Tamil Nadu in 2021. This corporation consist of 51 wards and the legislative body is headed by an elected chairperson assisted by a deputy chairperson and 51 councillors who represent each wards in the city.

Government of Tamil Nadu announced for upgrade of Thanjavur Special Grade Municipality to City Municipal Corporation of Thanjavur on 10 April 2014.
