= Tirunelveli Municipal Corporation =

Urban local body of Tamil Nadu, India

Tirunelveli City Municipal Corporation

Type
- Type: Municipal Corporation of Tirunelveli
- Established: June 1, 1994; 32 years ago

Leadership
- Mayor: G.Ramakrishnan
- Deputy Mayor: K.R.Raju
- Commissioner: Dr.Monika Rana, IAS
- District Collector: Dr.R.Sukumar, IAS

Structure
- Seats: 55
- Political groups: Government (46): SPA (46); DMK (45); MDMK (1); Opposition (9): AIADMK+ (4); AIADMK (4); TVK+ (4); INC (4); Others (1); IND (1)

Elections
- Last election: 2022
- Next election: 2027

Meeting place
- Office of Tirunelveli Corporation

Website
- www.tirunelvelicorporation.in

Tirunelveli City Municipal Corporation is the civic body which administers the city of Tirunelveli in Tamil Nadu, India. It consists of a legislative and an executive body. The legislative body is headed by the city mayor while the executive body is headed by a Chief Commissioner.

== History ==
The former Tirunelveli Municipality was constituted on 1 November 1866 as per the Town Improvements Act of 1865. It initially covered the area of Tirunelveli town and Tirunelveli Junction alone. Palayamkottai used to be an independent municipality. Tirunelveli and Palayamkottai for this reason are even today considered as twin cities. In 1994, Tirunelveli along with Tiruchirappalli and Salem was upgraded to a municipal corporation. Tirunelveli City Municipal Corporation was formed by merging the municipalities of Tirunelveli and Palayamkottai along with surrounding areas.

== Structure ==
Zones of Tirunelveli City Municipal Corporation

- Melapalayam Zone
- Palayamkottai Zone
- Thatchanallur Zone
- Tirunelveli Zone
- Pettai Zone

== Achievements ==
Tirunelveli City Municipal Corporation is the first Municipal Corporation in the whole country to introduce segregation of waste during collection itself. Plastics and polythene bags are collected only on Wednesdays. If citizens are fined for breaking the rule.
