= Dindigul Municipal Corporation =

Civic body in Tamil Nadu, India

Dindigul City Municipal Corporation Tiṇṭukkal Māṉakarāṭci

Type
- Type: Municipal Corporation of the Dindigul

History
- Founded: 19 February 2014

Leadership
- Mayor: J. Ilamathi, DMK since 4 March 2022
- Deputy Mayor: S. Rajappa, DMK since 4 March 2022
- Corporation Commissioner: N. Ravichandran
- District Collector: M. N. Poongodi

Structure
- Seats: 48
- Political groups: Government (33): SPA (33); DMK (30); Opposition (12): SSJVA (6); INC (2); IUML (1); VCK (3); CPI(M) (3); Others (11): AIADMK-led Alliance (6); AIADMK (5); BJP (1); IND (5)

Elections
- Last election: 2022
- Next election: 2027

Meeting place
- Dindigul City Municipal Corporation Office, Main Road, Dindigul

Website
- Dindigul Municipal Corporation; Dindigul District

The Dindigul City Municipal Corporation is a civic body that governs Dindigul city, India. This corporation consist of 48 wards and the legislative body is headed by an elected Chairperson assisted by a Deputy Chairperson and 48 councillors who represent each wards in the city. Government of Tamil Nadu announced for upgrade of Dindigul Special Grade Municipality to City Municipal Corporation of Dindigul.

On 19 February 2014, Chief Minister of Tamil Nadu, J. Jayalalithaa declared that Dindigul Municipality has been immediately upgraded to Corporation status. The said government order was handed over to the Municipal Chairman, V. Marudharaj

== History ==
In 1866 Nov 1, Dindigul town became a municipality. In 1988, on Jan 14, Dindigul Municipality became a Special Grade Municipality. Adiyanthu, Balakrishnanpuram, Chettinaickenpatti, Kurambapatti, Mullipadi, Pallapatti, Seelapadi, Thottanuthu Village Panchayat annexed to Dindigul City Municipal Corporation.
