= Kumbakonam Municipal Corporation =

Local government in Tamil Nadu, India

Kumbakonam City Municipal Corporation
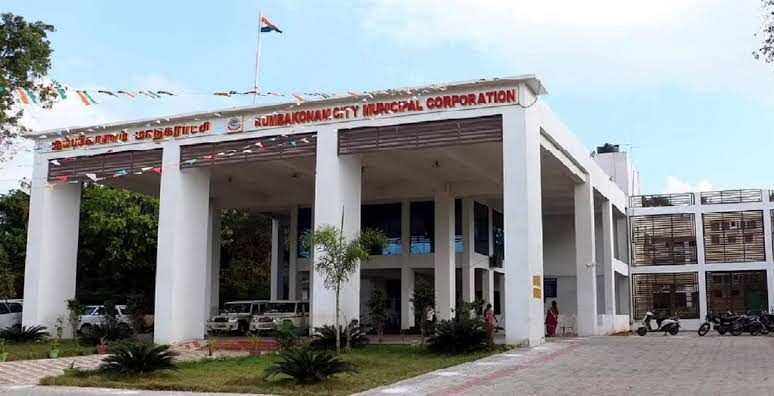

Type
- Type: Municipal Corporation of Kumbakonam

History
- Founded: 2021; 5 years ago

Leadership
- Mayor: K. Saravanan, INC since 4 March 2022
- Deputy Mayor: S. P. Tamizhazhagan, DMK since 4 March 2022
- Municipal Commissioner: M. Senthil Murugan
- District Collector: Tmt. B.Priyanka Pankajam, IAS

Elections
- Last election: 2022
- Next election: 2027

Website
- www.tnurbantree.tn.gov.in/kumbakonam/

Kumbakonam City Municipal Corporation is the civic body governing city of Kumbakonam in the Indian state of Tamil Nadu. Municipal Corporation mechanism in India was introduced during British Rule with formation of municipal corporation in Madras (Chennai) in 1688, later followed by municipal corporations in Bombay (Mumbai) and Calcutta (Kolkata) by 1762. Kumbakonam City Municipal Corporation is headed by Mayor of city and governed by Commissioner.

== History and administration ==
Kumbakonam City Municipal Corporation in Thanjavur district was formed on 20 December 2021 and is the 21st municipal corporation of Tamil Nadu. Kumbakonam City Municipal Corporation will include Darasuram town panchayat and 13 panchayats adjacent to the place. The place is driven spiritually through many important temples.

Kumbakonam City Municipal Corporation has a Commissioner, a Mayor, a Council, a Standing Committee, and a Wards Committee for facilitating various works.

== Factors driving Kumbakonam City Municipal Corporation ==
Kumbakonam City Municipal Corporation is driven by following factors:

- Population Growth.
- Increase in annual Income.
- Improvement of Roads.
- Providing drinking water.
- Improving landscape.
- Improving employment opportunities.
- Improving relations between police and public.
- Waste management.
- Arranging facilities during natural calamities.
- Establishing industrial units.
- Providing sewage connection.
- Clean Sanitation.

== Kumbakonam City Municipal Corporation local body polls ==
Kumbakonam City Municipal Corporation will get a mayor and municipal council through local body polls.

== See also ==
- List of municipal corporations in India
