= Karur City Municipal Corporation =

City government body in Tamil Nadu, India

History
- Founded: 2021; 5 years ago

Leadership
- Mayor of Karur: Thirumathi. V Kavitha Ganesan
- Deputy Mayor: Thiru. Dharani Saravanan

Elections
- Last election: 2022
- Next election: 2027

Website
- https://www.tnurbantree.tn.gov.in/karur/

Karur City Municipal Corporation is the civic body governing city of Karur in Indian state of Tamil Nadu. Municipal Corporation mechanism in India was introduced during British Rule with formation of municipal corporation in Madras (Chennai) in 1688, later followed by municipal corporations in Bombay (Mumbai) and Calcutta (Kolkata) by 1762. Karur City Municipal Corporation is headed by Mayor of city and governed by Commissioner. Karur is also one of the fastest growing cities of Tamil Nadu. Karur was a historical city and played a major role in the history of Tamil country.

== History and administration ==
Karur City Municipal Corporation in Karur district was formed in year 2021 and is and is one of the 21 municipal corporations in Tamil Nadu. It is one of the oldest municipalities in Tamil Nadu with 145 years. Karur City Municipal Corporation a Commissioner Mayor, a Council, a Standing Committee, a Wards Committee for facilitating various works.

Thirumathi. V Kavitha Ganesan and Thiru. Dharani Saravana,respectively are mayor and deputy mayor of Karur City Municipal Corporation.

== Factors driving Karur City Municipal Corporation ==
Karur City Municipal Corporation is driven by following factors:

- Population Growth.
- Increase in annual Income.
- Improvement of Roads.
- Providing drinking water.
- Improving landscape.
- Improving employment opportunities.
- Improving relations between police and public.
- Waste Management.
- Arranging facilities during natural calamities.
- Establishing industrial units.
- Providing sewage connection.

== Karur City Municipal Corporation local body polls ==
Karur City Municipal Corporation members are elected through local body polls.

== See also ==
- List of municipal corporations in India
