= Kancheepuram City Municipal Corporation =

Civic body that governs Kancheepuram, India

History
- Founded: 21 October 2021; 4 years ago

Leadership
- Mayor: M. Mahalakshmi
- Deputy Mayor: R. Kumaragurunaathan
- Municipal Commissioner: G. Kannan

Website
- https://www.tnurbantree.tn.gov.in/kancheepuram/

Kancheepuram City Municipal Corporation is the civic body that governs the city of Kancheepuram in the Indian state of Tamil Nadu. It is one of the four municipal corporations within the Chennai Metropolitan Area, the other three being the central Greater Chennai Corporation, the satellite Tambaram City Municipal Corporation and the Avadi City Municipal Corporation. Inaugurated on 21 October 2021 covering an area of 36.14 Sqkm with a population of 232,816. It is headed by Mayor who presides over 51 councillors, each of whom represents one of the 51 wards of the city and executive is governed by Municipal Commissioner. Located about 75 km from Chennai in Tamilnadu state of southern India, Kanchipuram is a temple City renowned for its majestic temple architecture and Silk sarees. Of the 108 holy temples of the Hindu god Vishnu (DivyaDesams), 14 are located in Kanchipuram. In ancient time the city was a hub for religious education and was known as the ghatikasthanam, or "place of learning".

== History and administration ==
Kancheepuram City Municipal Corporation was formed in the year 2021 and is one of 21 municipal corporations in Tamil Nadu. The place is driven spiritually through many important spiritual places linked to several ancient Vaishnavite and Saivite temples with continuous inflow of visitors.

Kancheepuram City Municipal Corporation a Commissioner Mayor, a Council, a Standing Committee, a Wards Committee for facilitating various works.

Currently the Municipal Commissioner is G. Kannan.

Koneerikuppam, Thiruparuthikundram, Karuppadithattadai, Kizhkathirpur, Sirukaveripakkam, Thimmasamudram, Keezhambi, Putheri, Kaliyanoor, Vaipavoor, Enathur Village Panchayats are annexed to Kanchipuram City Municipal Corporation

== Factors driving Kancheepuram City Municipal Corporation ==
Kancheepuram City Municipal Corporation is driven by following factors:

- Population Growth.
- Increase in annual Income.
- Improvement of Roads.
- Providing drinking water.
- Improving landscape.
- Improving employment opportunities.
- Improving relations between police and public.
- Waste Management.
- Arranging facilities during natural calamities.
- Establishing industrial units.
- Providing sewage connection.

== Municipal elections ==
In the 2022 urban polls, the DMK-led Secular Progressive Alliance won 32 of the 51 wards in the Kancheepuram City Municipal Corporation. M. Mahalakshmi, the DMK councillor from Ward 9, became the first Mayor of the city. R. Kumaragurunaathan is the first deputy mayor of the kanchipuram corporation.

== See also ==
- List of municipal corporations in India
