= Cuddalore Municipal Corporation =

Indian city governing body

Cuddalore City Municipal Corporation

History
- Founded: 2021

Leadership
- Mayor: R. Sundari
- Deputy Mayor: Pa. Tamaraiselvan
- Municipal Commissioner: P M N Mujibeer Rahumaan

Website
- https://www.tnurbantree.tn.gov.in/cuddalore/

Cuddalore City Municipal Corporation is the civic body governing the city of Cuddalore, which is in the Cuddalore district of the Indian state of Tamil Nadu. The corporation is headed by the Mayor and governed by a commissioner.

== History and administration ==
The Cuddalore City Municipal Corporation was formed in 2021 and is one of the 25 municipal corporations in Tamil Nadu.

Corporation members are elected through local polls. They then elect the Mayor from amongst themselves. The first election to the corporation was held on 19 February 2022.

== List of mayors ==
No.	Name	Term in office			Political party
No.	Name	Assumed office	Left office	Time in office	Political party
1	R. Sundari	4 March 2022	Incumbent	4 years, 104 days	Dravida Munnetra Kazhagam

== List of deputy mayors ==
No.	Name	Term in office			Political party
No.	Name	Assumed office	Left office	Time in office	Political party
1	Thamarai Selvan	4 March 2022	Incumbent	4 years, 104 days	Viduthalai Chiruthaigal Katchi

== See also ==
- List of municipal corporations in India
