= Sivakasi Municipal Corporation =

Government for Sivakasi, Tamil Nadu, India

Sivakasi City Municipal Corporation

History
- Founded: 2021; 5 years ago

Website
- https://www.tnurbantree.tn.gov.in/sivakasi/

Sivakasi City Municipal Corporation is the civic body governing city of Sivakasi in Indian state of Tamil Nadu. Municipal Corporation mechanism in India was introduced during British Rule with formation of municipal corporation in Madras (Chennai) in 1688, later followed by municipal corporations in Bombay (Mumbai) and Calcutta (Kolkata) by 1762. Sivakasi City Municipal Corporation is headed by Mayor of city and governed by Commissioner.

== History and administration ==
Sivakasi Municipal Corporation in Virudhunagar district was formed in year 2021 and is one of the 21 municipal corporations in Tamil Nadu. The place is known majorly for manufacturing fire crackers.

Sivakasi City Municipal Corporation a Commissioner Mayor, a Council, a Standing Committee, a Wards Committee for facilitating various works.

Currently the Municipal Commissioner is .

== Factors driving Sivakasi City Municipal Corporation ==
Sivakasi City Municipal Corporation is driven by following factors:

- Population Growth.
- Increase in annual Income.
- Improvement of Roads.
- Providing drinking water.
- Improving landscape.
- Improving employment opportunities.
- Improving relations between police and public.
- Waste Management.
- Arranging facilities during natural calamities.
- Establishing industrial units.
- Providing sewage connection.

== Sivakasi City Municipal Corporation local body polls ==
Sivakasi City Municipal Corporation will get a mayor and municipal council through local body polls.

== See also ==
- List of municipal corporations in India
