= Balasubramaniam =

Balasubramaniam బాలసుబ్రహ్మణ్యం பாலசுப்ரமணியம் ಬಾಲಸುಬ್ರಹ್ಮಣ್ಯಂ ബാലസുബ്രഹ്മണ്യം
- Gender: Male
- Language: Tamil; Telugu; Kannada; Malayalam

Origin
- Meaning: Young Subramaniam
- Region of origin: Southern India; North-eastern Sri Lanka

Other names
- Alternative spelling: Balasubramanian; Balasubramaniem; Balasubramanyam; Balasubrahmanyam
- Derived: Murugan

Balasubramaniam or Balasubramanian (Telugu: బాలసుబ్రహ్మణ్యం; Tamil: பாலசுப்ரமணியம்; Kannada: ಬಾಲಸುಬ್ರಹ್ಮಣ್ಯಂ; Malayalam: ബാലസുബ്രഹ്മണ്യം) is a male given name in South India and Sri Lanka. Due to the South Indian tradition of using patronymic surnames it may also be a surname for males and females. Balasubramaniam is derived from the Sanskrit words balu meaning "young" and Subramaniam (itself derived from the Sanskrit words su, meaning "auspicious" and brahmanyam, translated loosely as "auspicious effulgence of the Supreme Spirit"). By extension, it refers to the Hindu god Murugan as a child or young man, the way the term Balakrishna refers to the young Krishna.

In Telugu, the name is written as Balasubrahmanyam or Balasubramanyam, closer to the Sanskrit root word. In Kannada, the name is transliterated as Balasubrahmanya or Balasubramanya.

== Notable people ==
=== Family name ===
- Balasubramanian, Indian politician
- Balasubramaniem (born 1966), Indian cinematographer
- A. Balasubramaniam (born 1971), Indian artist
- D. Balasubramaniam, Indian actor
- G. N. Balasubramaniam (1910–1965), Indian musician
- K. Balasubramanian, Indian politician
- Krishnakumar Balasubramanian, Indian actor
- Kudavayil Balasubramanian, Indian archaeologist
- P Balasubramaniam (1960–2013), Malaysian police officer
- P. Balasubramanian, Indian politician
- R. Balasubramaniam, Indian actor
- Ramachandran Balasubramanian (born 1951), Indian mathematician
- S. Balasubramanian (1935–2014), Indian journalist
- S. P. Balasubrahmanyam (1946–2020), Indian musician
- S. R. Balasubramaniam, Indian politician
- Shankar Balasubramanian (born 1966), British chemist
- Shanker Balasubramaniam, Indian-American electrical engineer
- Sirpi Balasubramaniam (born 1936), Indian poet and academic
- V. P. Balasubramanian, Indian politician
- Prisca Thevenot, née Balasoobramanen (born 1985), French politician

=== Surname ===
- Balasubramaniam Deniswaran, Sri Lankan lawyer and politician
- Balasubramanian Muthuraman, Indian businessman
- Balasubramaniam Neminathan (1922–1984), Ceylonese politician
- Balasubramaniam Ramamurthi (1922–2003), Indian physician
- Balasubramanian Sundaram, Indian chemist
- Malar Balasubramanian (born 1976), American physician
- Rajeev Balasubramanyam (born 1974), British author
