= R. Nallakannu =

Indian politician (1924–2026)

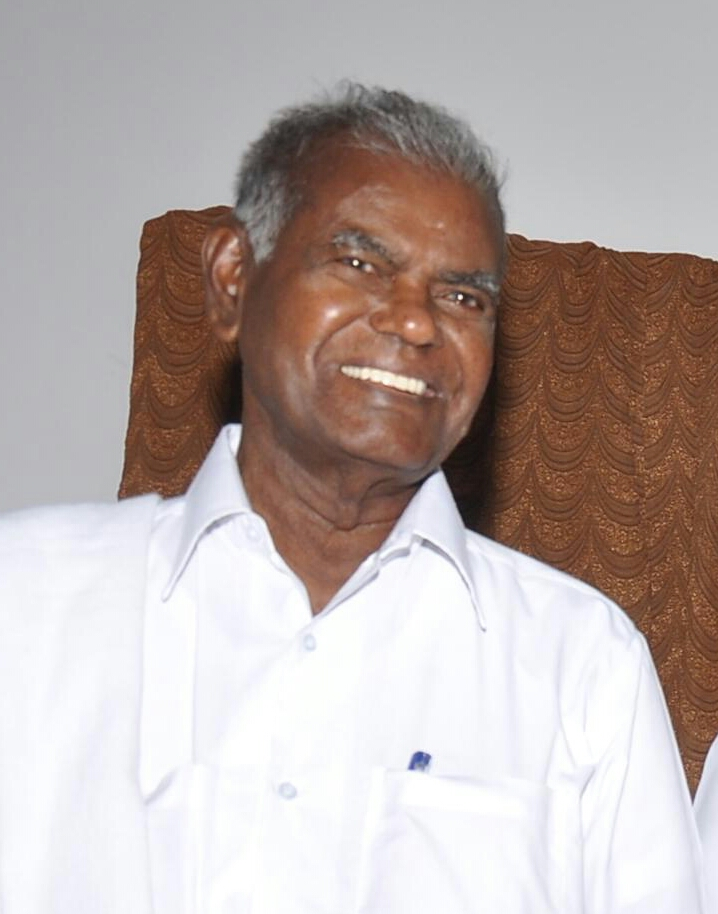

Secretary, CPI Tamil Nadu State Committee
- In office 7 March 1992 – 15 April 2005
- Preceded by: P. Manickam
- Succeeded by: Tha. Pandian

Personal details
- Born: 26 December 1924 Tiruvaikuntam, Tirunelveli district, Madras Presidency, British India (now Srivaikuntam, Thoothukudi district, Tamil Nadu, India)
- Died: 25 February 2026 (aged 101) Chennai, Tamil Nadu, India
- Party: Communist Party of India
- Spouse: Ranjitham Ammal
- Parents: Ramasamy (father); Karuppayi Ammal (mother)
- Occupation: Politician, social activist

Ramasamy Nallakannu (26 December 1924 – 25 February 2026) was an Indian politician. He was a senior leader of the Communist Party of India (CPI), who served as the State Secretary of the Communist Party of India of Tamil Nadu from 1992 to 2005.

== Career ==
In 2018, Nallakannu individually fought a court case in Madurai, and won at the High Court. The court ordered a ban on digging sands from the Thamirabarani River of his native place. On 2 December 2010, the court banned the taking of sand from the river for 5 years. He undertook many hunger strikes, some lasting more than 20 days. He was honoured by the Vice President of the People's Republic of China during his visit to Beijing.

In 1999, Nallakannu stood for Coimbatore constituency on parliamentary election. He secured 43.21% of total votes, and was defeated by CP Radhakrishnan.

== Personal life and death ==
Nallakannu married Ranjitham Ammal, a retired school headmistress from Srivaikuntam in Tuticorin district, with whom he had two daughters. Ranjitham died in Chennai in 2016, aged 82.

Nallakannu died from multiple organ failure on 25 February 2026, at the age of 101.

== Recognition ==
- Sahayogi Puraskar Award from Governor Surjit Singh Barnala of Tamil Nadu (14 August 2007)
- Ambedkar Award for Contribution to Public Life (2007)
- Gandhian Award for Social Service from All India Mahatma Gandhi Social Welfare Forum (3 October 2008)
- Jeeva Award from District Writers Association (21 January 2009)

== Electoral history ==
=== Lok Sabha elections ===
| Elections | Assembly | Constituency | Political party | Result | Vote percentage | Opposition | | |
| Elections | Assembly | Constituency | Political party | Result | Vote percentage | Candidate | Political party | Vote percentage |
|---|---|---|---|---|---|---|---|---|
| 1999 | 13th | Coimbatore | CPI | Lost | 43.02% | C. P. Radhakrishnan | BJP | 49.21% |

=== Tamil Nadu Assembly elections ===
| Elections | Assembly | Constituency | Political party | Result | Vote percentage | Opposition | | |
| Elections | Assembly | Constituency | Political party | Result | Vote percentage | Candidate | Political party | Vote percentage |
|---|---|---|---|---|---|---|---|---|
| 1967 | 4th | Ambasamudram | CPI | Lost | 11.10% | G. Gomathisankara Dikshidar | INC | 46.35% |
| 1977 | 6th | Ambasamudram | CPI | Lost | 32.63% | Eswaramoorthy Alias Soranam | CPI(M) | 35.33% |
