= Ratnavel Pandian =

Former judge of the Supreme Court of India

The Honourable Justice S Ratnavel Pandian

Judge, Supreme Court of India
- In office 14 December 1988 – 12 March 1994
- Appointed by: R. Venkataraman (President of India)
- Chief Justice(s): Raghunandan Swarup Pathak (1986-89); E.S. Venkataramiah (1989); Sabyasachi Mukharji (1989-90); Ranganath Misra (1990-91); Kamal Narain Singh (1991); Madhukar Hiralal Kania (1991-92); Lalit Mohan Sharma (1992-93); Manepalli Narayanarao Venkatachaliah (1993-94)

Chief Justice, Madras High Court

Personal details
- Born: 13 March 1929 Thiruppudaimaruthur, Tinnevely District, Madras Presidency, British India (now Tirunelveli District, Tamil Nadu, India)
- Died: 28 February 2018 (aged 88) Chennai, Tamil Nadu, India
- Spouse: Lalitha
- Children: Ratnavel Pandian Subbiah (son)
- Education: Madras University (BA), (BL)

Justice S. Rathinavel Pandian (13 March 1929 - 28 February 2018) was a judge of the Supreme Court of India. He was among the nine judges on the Constitution Bench which heard the famous Mandal Commission Case "Indira Sawhney vs Union of India". In that judgment delivered in 1992, the reservation for the backward classes was affirmed.

On August 14, 2006, Justice Pandian took charge as the Chairman of the National Commission for Backward Classes. He was given the status of a Cabinet Minister during his tenure, until 2009.

== Early life and education ==
Pandian was born on 13 March 1929 in Tirupudaimarudur, a village near Ambasamudram in present-day Tirunelveli district, Tamil Nadu. Rathinavel Pandian completed his schooling at Theerthapathi School, Ambasamudram and his college education at St. Xavier College, Tirunelveli. In 1954, he studied law at the Madras Law College.

== Political career ==
Pandian was the District Secretary of the Dravida Munnetra Kazhagam (DMK) in Tirunelveli District in the 1960s. When the party president M. Karunanidhi was arrested during the anti-Hindi agitations and was in Palayamkottai Central Prison, Rathinavel Pandian used to visit him every day.

Pandian unsuccessfully contested as a DMK candidate in the assembly constituencies of Ambasamudram (in 1962) and Cheranmadevi (in 1971).

1962 Madras Legislative Assembly election: Ambasamudram
Party	Candidate	Votes	%	±%
INC	G. Gomathisankara Dikshidar	25,883	38.16%	−12.36%
CPI	A. Nallasivan	20,216	29.81%	
DMK	S. Rathinavelpandian	17,107	25.22%	
SWA	R. K. Viswanathan	3,907	5.76%	
Independent	M. P. Annamalai	707	1.04%	
Margin of victory		5,667	8.36%	−6.20%
Turnout		67,820	76.33%	23.28%
Registered electors		91,722		
INC hold		Swing	-12.36%	

1971 Tamil Nadu Legislative Assembly election: Cheranmadevi
Party	Candidate	Votes	%	±%
SWA	D. S. A. Sivaprakasam	34,739	50.14%	New
DMK	S. Ratnavelpandian	34,546	49.86%	New
Margin of victory		193	0.28%	−9.19%
Turnout		69,285	77.20%	−3.42%
Registered electors		91,676		
SWA hold		Swing	-3.64%	

== Legal career ==
=== As Advocate ===
In the early days Mr. Ratnavel Pandian, took his apprenticeship with Mr. K. Narayanasamy, Senior Advocate. After Mr. K. Narayanasamy Mudaliar became a Judge of the Madras High Court, Mr. Pandian worked as a Junior Advocate with Mr. Cellapandian and with Mr. Rajagopala Iyer. After 17 years as a lawyer, he was appointed the Attorney General of the Madras High Court in 1971. Vaiko, the future general secretary of the Marumalarchi Dravida Munnetra Kazhagam (MDMK), was one of his junior lawyers.

=== As High Court Judge ===
Mr. Ratnavel Pandian was elevated as a Judge of the Madras High Court in 1974.

The statue of Manu Neethi or Samaneethi Cholan was erected by Justice Ratnavel Pandian at the Madras High Court premises. (The statue of Manuneedhi Cholan, who executed his son and sentenced him to death for causing the death of a calf for which the cow had sought justice.)

=== As Supreme Court Judge ===
On December 14, 1988, he was appointed a Judge of the Supreme Court of India. On March 12, 1994, he retired from his service as the Judge of the Supreme Court of India.

== Post-retirement ==
After his retirement in 1994, he served as the Chairman of the 5th Pay Commission of India and submitted his final report in April 1997.

== Award ==
Madras Bar Association had given "Life Time Achievement Award" to Justice S. Ratnavel Pandian. It was presented by Mr. Justice Sathish K. Agnihotri Acting Chief Justice, Madras High Court on 21 June 2014.

== Death ==
Pandian died on 28 February 2018 due to cardiac arrest at his residence in Anna Nagar locality of Chennai, two weeks before his 89th birthday.

== Family ==
He is survived by five sons and a daughter. His son Ratnavel Pandian Subbaiah, is a sitting judge of the Madras High Court.
