= Reddiarpatti V. Narayanan =

Indian politician

Member of the Tamil Nadu Legislative Assembly
- Incumbent
- Assumed office 4 May 2026
- Preceded by: Ruby R. Manoharan
- Constituency: Nanguneri
- In office 24 October 2019 – 2 May 2021
- Preceded by: H. Vasanthakumar
- Succeeded by: Ruby R. Manoharan
- Constituency: Nanguneri

Personal details
- Party: Tamilaga Vettri Kazhagam
- Other political affiliations: All India Anna Dravida Munnetra Kazhagam
- Profession: Politician

Reddiarpatti V. Narayanan is an Indian politician from Tamil Nadu. He is a member of the Tamil Nadu Legislative Assembly from Nanguneri representing Tamilaga Vettri Kazhagam.

== Political career ==
Narayanan won the Nanguneri seat in the 2026 Tamil Nadu Legislative Assembly election as a candidate of Tamilaga Vettri Kazhagam. He received 74,952 votes and defeated Ruby R. Manoharan of the Indian National Congress by a margin of 16,419 votes.
