= V. Narayanan (politician) =

Indian politician

Member of Tamil Nadu Legislative Assembly
- In office 24 October 2019 – 2 May 2021
- Preceded by: H. Vasanthakumar
- Succeeded by: Ruby R. Manoharan

Personal details
- Party: All India Anna Dravida Munnetra Kazhagam

V. Narayanan is an Indian politician in the All India Anna Dravida Munnetra Kazhagam party. He was elected as a member of the Tamil Nadu Legislative Assembly from Nanguneri on 24 October 2019.
