= P. Andivel =

Member of the Legislative Assembly, Tamil Nadu Legislative Assembly
- In office 2001–2006
- Preceded by: S. V. Krishnan
- Succeeded by: M. Dhandapani
- Constituency: Vedasandur

Personal details
- Born: 12 April 1957 Nagaiyakottai
- Party: All India Anna Dravida Munnetra Kazhagam
- Profession: Farmer

P. Andivel is an Indian politician and a former Member of the Tamil Nadu Legislative Assembly. He hails from Nagaiyakottai village in the Dindigul district. Having completed his school education, Andivel is a member of the All India Anna Dravida Munnetra Kazhagam (AIADMK) party. He was elected to the Tamil Nadu Legislative Assembly in the 2001 elections, representing the Vedasandur Assembly constituency.

== Electoral Performance ==
=== 2001 ===
2001 Tamil Nadu Legislative Assembly election: Vedasandur
Party	Candidate	Votes	%	±%
AIADMK	P. Andivel	65,415	49.01%	+20.09
DMK	R. Kavitha Parthipan	46,289	34.68%	−9.31
MDMK	S. Karnan	8,381	6.28%	−18.24
Thaayaga Makkal Katchi	V. Rethinam	6,984	5.23%	New
Independent	P. Sivasubramani Alias Dalit Siva	2,296	1.72%	New
Independent	K. Andavan	1,966	1.47%	New
JD(U)	A. Karuppanan	1,221	0.91%	New
CPI(ML)L	S. Murugesan	923	0.69%	New
Margin of victory		19,126	14.33%	−0.74%
Turnout		133,475	61.67%	−4.79%
Registered electors		216,457		
AIADMK gain from DMK		Swing	5.02%	
