= P. H. Pandian =

Indian politician (1945–2020)

Member of Parliament, Lok Sabha
- In office 10 October 1999 – 22 May 2004
- Preceded by: M. R. Kadambur Janarthanan
- Succeeded by: R. Dhanuskodi Athithan
- Constituency: Tirunelveli

6th Speaker of the Tamil Nadu Legislative Assembly
- In office 27 February 1985 – 5 February 1989
- Deputy: V. P. Balasubramanian
- Preceded by: K. Rajaram
- Succeeded by: M. Tamilkudimagan

Member of Tamil Nadu Legislative Assembly
- In office 30 June 1977 – 30 January 1991
- Preceded by: D. S. A. Sivaprakasam
- Succeeded by: R. Puthunainar Adithan
- Constituency: Cheranmadevi

Personal details
- Born: 27 February 1945 Tirunelveli, Tamil Nadu, British Raj
- Died: 4 January 2020 (aged 74) Chennai, Tamil Nadu, India
- Children: Paul Manoj Pandian (Son)

Paul Hector Pandian (27 February 1945 – 4 January 2020) was an Indian politician affiliated with the All India Anna Dravida Munnetra Kazhagam (AIADMK) and a Member of the Legislative Assembly of Tamil Nadu from Tirunelveli district. He served as the Speaker of the Tamil Nadu Legislative Assembly from 1985 to 1989.

He served as both Deputy Speaker and Speaker of the Tamil Nadu Legislative Assembly from 21 June 1980 to 5 February 1989. In the 1989 election, he was one of only two candidates elected from the V. N. Janaki Ramachandran faction of the AIADMK, winning the Cheranmahadevi seat.

Pandian was later elected to the Lok Sabha from the Tirunelveli parliamentary constituency in the 1999 general election. He also served as the organising secretary of the AIADMK under the leadership of former Chief Minister J. Jayalalithaa.

His son, Paul Manoj Pandian, was also elected an MLA for AIADMK in 2001 from Cheranmahadevi, the same constituency represented by P. H. Pandian in 1989.

Pandian was one of the two senior AIADMK leaders who had not supported the ascension of Sasikala within the party after the death of Jayalalithaa in December 2016. Pandian further spoke out against Sasikala's chief ministerial candidacy in February 2017, asserting that she was unfit for the position. He also raised suspicions over Jayalalithaa's death claiming that she had died under unnatural circumstances.

== Electoral performance ==
1991 Tamil Nadu Legislative Assembly election: Cheranmadevi
Party	Candidate	Votes	%	±%
AIADMK	R. Puthunainar Adithan	59,358	65.44%	+38.38
Independent	P. H. Pandian	24,890	27.44%	New
Independent	N. S. Nadarajan	4,912	5.42%	New
Margin of victory		34,468	38.00%	37.27%
Turnout		90,705	67.06%	−11.54%
Registered electors		139,906		
AIADMK hold		Swing	38.38%	

1989 Tamil Nadu Legislative Assembly election: Cheranmadevi
Party	Candidate	Votes	%	±%
AIADMK	P. H. Pandian	26,113	27.06%	−40.39
DMK	R. Avudaiappan	25,413	26.34%	−5.31
INC	P. Veldurai	23,270	24.12%	New
AIADMK	T. P. S. H. Amarnath Prapahar Ram Sait	20,409	21.15%	−46.3
Margin of victory		700	0.73%	−35.08%
Turnout		96,494	78.60%	0.92%
Registered electors		124,735		
AIADMK hold		Swing	-40.39%	

1984 Tamil Nadu Legislative Assembly election: Cheranmadevi
Party	Candidate	Votes	%	±%
AIADMK	P. H. Pandian	55,898	67.45%	+9.83
DMK	P. S. Pandian	26,225	31.64%	New
Margin of victory		29,673	35.80%	19.50%
Turnout		82,874	77.68%	6.43%
Registered electors		112,131		
AIADMK hold		Swing	9.83%	

1980 Tamil Nadu Legislative Assembly election: Cheranmadevi
Party	Candidate	Votes	%	±%
AIADMK	P. H. Pandian	42,793	57.62%	+22.27
INC	V. Ratnasabhapathy	30,683	41.31%	+9.31
Independent	M. James	407	0.55%	New
Margin of victory		12,110	16.30%	12.97%
Turnout		74,274	71.25%	3.50%
Registered electors		105,348		
AIADMK hold		Swing	22.27%	

1977 Tamil Nadu Legislative Assembly election: Cheranmadevi
Party	Candidate	Votes	%	±%
AIADMK	P. H. Pandian	24,256	35.34%	New
INC	V. Ratnasabapathi	21,964	32.00%	New
DMK	K. S. Subramaniam	11,469	16.71%	−33.15
JP	K. Selvaraj	10,946	15.95%	New
Margin of victory		2,292	3.34%	3.06%
Turnout		68,635	67.75%	−9.45%
Registered electors		102,377		
AIADMK gain from SWA		Swing	-14.80%	
