= S. Gandhirajan =

Indian politician

Member of the Tamil Nadu Legislative Assembly
- In office 2 May 2021 – 4 May 2026
- Political Party: DMK
- Preceded by: V. P. B. Paramasivam
- Succeeded by: V. P. B. Paramasivam
- Constituency: Vedasandur
- In office June 1991 – May 1996
- Political Party: AIADMK
- Preceded by: P. Muthusamy
- Succeeded by: S. V. Krishnan
- Constituency: Vedasandur

Deputy Speaker of Tamil Nadu legislative assembly
- In office 1993–1996
- Preceded by: K. Ponnuswamy
- Succeeded by: Parithi Ilamvazhuthi
- Constituency: Vedasandur

Personal details
- Party: Dravida Munnetra Kazhagam

S. Gandhirajan is a Member of the Legislative Assembly (MLA) of Vedansandur, Tamil Nadu during the 16th Tamil Nadu Assembly (2021-2026). He was elected to represent the constituency Vedasandur, then a constituency of Dindigul district (Earlier under the "Palani Lok Sabha constituency", currently under the "Karur Lok Sabha constituency"), in the election of 1991. During his period as MLA, he also held the position as the chairman of the "Tamilnadu Water and drainage Board department" (1992–1993) and also as the deputy speaker of the legislative assembly from 1993 to 1996.

In 2006 Gandhirajan's "sidelining" by the All India Anna Dravida Munnetra Kazhagam was considered to have weakened their position in Vedasandur, as Gandhirajan loyalists were less willing to work for the candidate nominated in his place. This led to his decision to join the opposition party Dravida Munnetra Kazhagam led by Dr. M. Karunanidhi (also cited as Kalaingar).

== Elections contested ==
Election	Constituency	Party	Result	Vote %	Runner-up	Runner-up Party	Runner-up vote %	Ref.
1989 Tamil Nadu state assembly election	Vedasandur	ADMK(JL)	Lost	29.02	P. Muthusmay	DMK	29.72	
1991 Tamil Nadu state assembly election	Vedasandur	ADMK	Won	76.47	P. Muthusmay	DMK	22.43	
1996 Tamil Nadu state assembly election	Vedasandur	ADMK	Lost	28.92	S.V.Krishnan	DMK	43.98	
2021 Tamil Nadu Legislative Assembly election	Vedasandur	DMK	Won	50.45%	V. P. B. Paramasivam	ADMK	42.13%	
