= H. Vasanthakumar =

Indian businessman and politician (1950–2020)

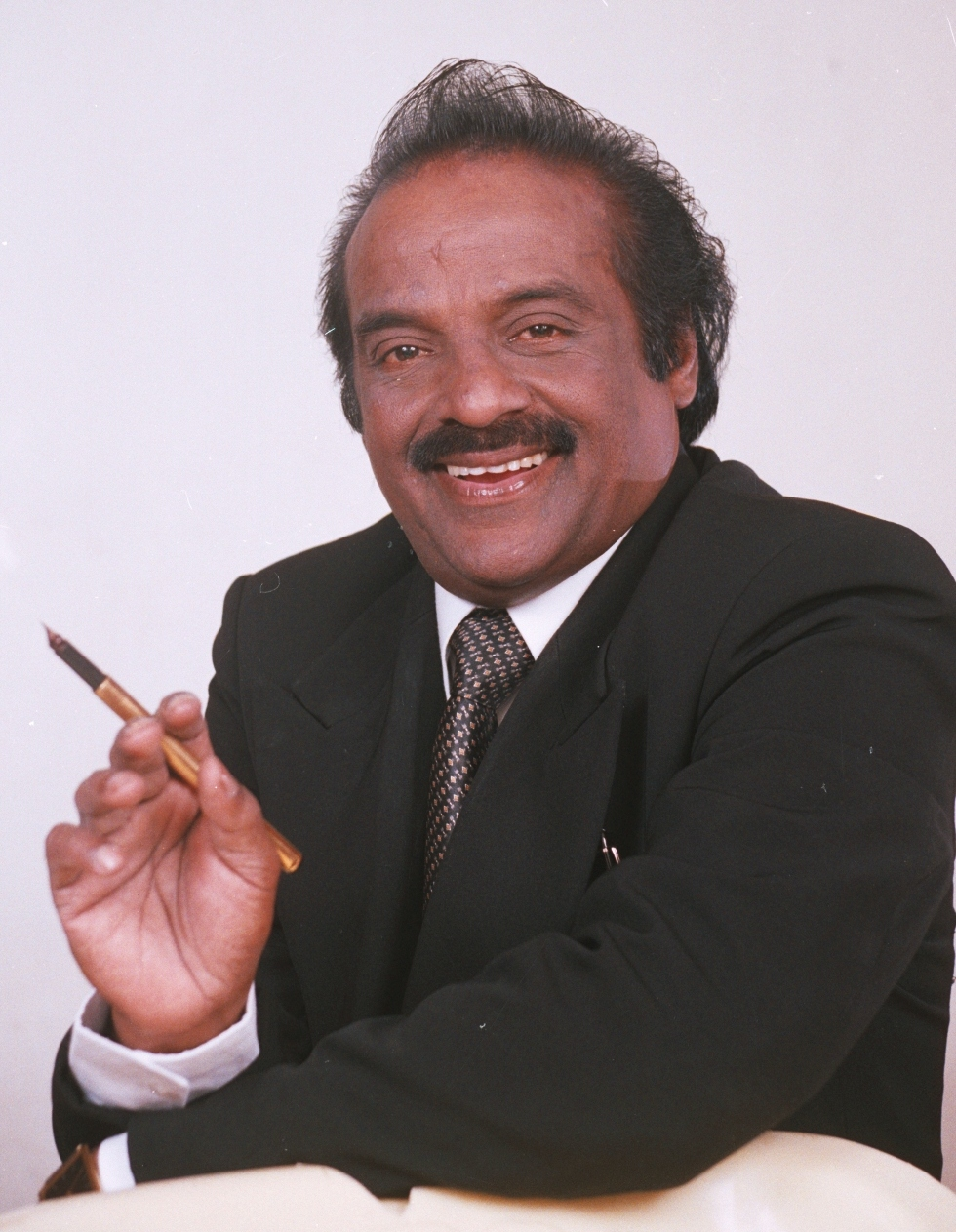

Member of Parliament, Lok Sabha
- In office 18 June 2019 – 28 August 2020
- Speaker: Om Birla
- Preceded by: Pon Radhakrishnan
- Succeeded by: Vijay Vasanth
- Constituency: Kanniyakumari

Member of Tamil Nadu Legislative Assembly
- In office 25 May 2016 – 29 May 2019
- Speaker: P. Dhanapal
- Preceded by: A. Narayanan
- Succeeded by: Reddiarpatti V. Narayanan
- Constituency: Nanguneri
- In office 17 May 2006 – 14 May 2011
- Speaker: R. Avudaiappan
- Preceded by: S. Manickaraj
- Succeeded by: A. Narayanan
- Constituency: Nanguneri

Personal details
- Born: Harikrishnan Vasanthakumar; 14 April 1950 Agasteeswaram, Travancore–Cochin, India (present-day Kanyakumari District, Tamil Nadu, India)
- Died: 28 August 2020 (aged 70) Chennai, Tamil Nadu, India
- Party: Indian National Congress
- Spouse: Tamilselvi
- Children: Vijay Vasanth; Vinothkumar; Thangamalar
- Parents: Harikrishnan Nadar (father); Thangammal (mother)
- Relatives: Kumari Ananthan (elder brother); Tamilisai Soundararajan (niece)
- Occupation: Businessman Politician
- Known for: Founder, chairman and managing director of Vasanth & Co, Vasanth TV

Harikrishnan Nadar Vasanthakumar (14 April 1950 – 28 August 2020) was an Indian businessman and politician. He was the founder and chairman of Vasanth & Co, one of the largest retail home appliance chains in Tamil Nadu. He was also the founder and managing director of the Tamil satellite TV channel Vasanth TV. He was elected as the member of parliament to the 17th Lok Sabha from Kanyakumari constituency in the 2019 Indian general election. He was also elected as member of the Tamil Nadu Legislative Assembly from Nanguneri constituency in the 2006 and 2016 elections.

== Early life ==
Vasanthakumar was born in Agastheeswaram in the Kanniyakumari district to Harikrishnan Nadar and Thangammal on 14 April 1950. He completed his primary education from a Panchayat board school in Kanniyakumari, later obtaining his bachelor's and master's degrees in Tamil literature from Madurai Kamaraj University. His brother, Kumari Ananthan, was also a legislator from the Indian National Congress.

== Business career ==
He started his career as a salesman in the early 1970s, including working with VGP. In 1978, he started his own home appliances sales showroom Vasanth & Co, with its first store in the T. Nagar neighborhood in Chennai. The company went on to become one of the leading retail chains with showrooms across Tamil Nadu, Karnataka, Kerala, and Puducherry. Vasanthakumar and his company are credited with pioneering sales of consumer electronics goods on equated monthly installments in the Indian market, as well as centralized after-sales support.

Vasanthakumar founded the Tamil satellite television network Vasanth TV in 2008.

== Political career ==
Vasanthakumar started his political career as a worker with the Indian National Congress political party taking up multiple local organizational roles. His first electoral politics stint was in 2006, as the MLA of Tamil Nadu from the Nanguneri constituency in Tamil Nadu. He won the elections by defeating S.P. Sooryakumar of the All India Anna Dravida Munnetra Kazhagam political party. This was a significant win for the party because it was after three decades that the party was able to win this electoral seat. One of his campaign promises included the establishment of a Special economic zone with a hi-tech park in Nanguneri. He contested the election from Kanyakumari Lok Sabha constituency in 2014 against Pon Radhakrishnan and lost the elections. In his second term as a member of the Tamil Nadu Legislative Assembly, he represented Nanguneri again in 2016. He served the constituency until 2019 when he went on to become the MP, as a member of the 17th Lok Sabha from the Kanyakumari Lok Sabha constituency. He won this election, against the incumbent Minister of State in the Ministry of Finance, and Minister of State in the Ministry of Shipping Pon Radhakrishnan, by winning with a margin of over 250,000 votes.

He was the working President of the Tamil Nadu Congress Committee (TNCC) from 2019 through his death in August 2020. Earlier, he had served as the Vice-President of the TNCC, and also as the Chairman of the TNCC Traders wing.

== Electoral Career ==
=== Tamil Nadu Legislative Assembly Elections Contested ===
Elections	Constituency	Party	Result	Vote percentage	Opposition Candidate	Opposition Party	Opposition vote percentage
2006	Nanguneri	INC	Won	51.76	S. P. Sooriyakumar	AIADMK	32.58
2011	Nanguneri	INC	Lost	37.31	A. Narayanan	AIADMK	45.91
2016	Nanguneri	INC	Won	43.45	M. Vijayakumar	AIADMK	33.41

=== Lok Sabha Elections Contested ===
Elections	Constituency	Party	Result	Vote percentage	Opposition Candidate	Opposition Party	Opposition vote percentage
2014 Indian general election	Kanniyakumari	INC	Lost	24.64	Pon Radhakrishnan	BJP	37.62
2019 Indian general election	Kanniyakumari	INC	Won	59.77	Pon Radhakrishnan	BJP	35.00

== Writings ==
Vasanthakumar wrote a three part autobiographical book series in Tamil, titled "Vetri Padikattu" – (transl. Ladder of Success), focusing on his entrepreneurial success and community building initiatives.

== Death ==
Vasanthakumar died of complications from COVID-19 at the Apollo Hospitals in Chennai on 28 August 2020, during the COVID-19 pandemic in India. He was admitted to the hospital on 10 August 2020, and was on ECMO and ventilator life support, prior to his death.

President Ram Nath Kovind, Prime Minister Narendra Modi, Tamil Nadu Chief Minister Edappadi K. Palaniswami, Congress leader and Wayanad MP Rahul Gandhi, Governor of Tamil Nadu Banwarilal Purohit among others were amongst those who expressed their condolences.

He is survived by his wife Tamil Selvi, two sons, and a daughter. His wife was also undergoing treatment for COVID-19 at the time of his death.

Lok Sabha
Preceded by Pon Radhakrishnan	Member of Parliament for Kanyakumari; 2019–2020	Succeeded by Vijay Vasanth
