= Subramaniam =

Subramaniam சுப்பிரமணியம் సుబ్రహ్మణ్యం
- Gender: Male
- Language: Tamil; Telugu

Origin
- Meaning: dear to Brahmins, used as a name of son of Hindu god Shiva
- Region of origin: Southern India; North-eastern Sri Lanka

Other names
- Alternative spelling: Subrahmanyam; Subrahmanyan; Subramania; Subramanian; Subramaniya; Subramanyam; Subramanyan
- Derived: Murugan
- See also: Balasubramaniam

Subramaniam, Subrahmaniam, Subramaniam or Subramanian (Tamil: சுப்பிரமணியம்; Telugu: సుబ్రహ్మణ్యం) is a South Indian male given name. Due to the South Indian tradition of using patronymic surnames it may also be a surname for males and females. The etymology of the name is from Sanskrit; however, a common translation is "pure, white, fresh", or "clarity in full". Proposed translation is derived from merging two common Sanskrit words su-bra- (सु), meaning "white, clear" or "transparent," and ani-ya, meaning wearing; the name translates precisely as "person with transparent qualities or God". Subramania is one of the many names of the Hindu god Karthikeya, also known as Kumara or Murugan.

In Telugu, Subrahmaniam or Subramaniam is the transliteration of the name (closer to the Sanskrit root word).

== Notable people ==
- A. L. Subramanian, Indian politician
- Chidambaram Subramaniam (1910–2000), Indian politician
- E. M. Subramaniam (1948–2015), Indian musician
- G. Subramania Iyer (1855–1916), Indian journalist
- K. Subrahmanyam (1929–2011), Indian strategist
- K. A. Subramaniam (1931–1989), Sri Lankan politician
- Ka. Naa. Subramanyam (1912–1988), Indian author
- K. G. Subramanyan (1924–2016), Indian artist
- Kandala Subrahmanyam (1920–2018), Indian lawyer
- Krishnaswami Subrahmanyam (1904–1971), Indian film director
- L. Subramaniam (born 1947), Indian musician
- M. Arun Subramanian, Indian politician
- M. Subramaniam, Indian politician
- M. G. Subramaniam (1931–1993), Indian cricket umpire
- M. M. Subramaniam (c. 1870–1945), Ceylonese politician
- M. P. Subramaniam, Indian politician
- Mas Subramanian, Indian chemist
- Mukkur N. Subramanian, Indian politician
- Musiri Subramania Iyer, Indian singer
- N. Subramanian, Indian politician
- N. Subramanian Chettiar, Indian politician
- O. Subramanian, Indian politician
- Olappamanna Subramanian Namboothirippad, Malayalam poet
- P. Subramaniam, Indian film director
- Patnam Subramania Iyer, Indian music composer
- R. C. Subramanian, Indian politician
- Sattur A. G. Subramaniam (1916–1977), Indian musician
- P. V. Subramaniam (1917–2007), Indian music critic
- S. Pakkur Subramanyan, Indian politician
- S. Subramania Iyer (1842–1924), Indian lawyer
- S. Subramaniam (footballer) (born 1985), Malaysian footballer
- S. Subramanian, Indian police chief
- Subramaniam Chettiar (1901–1975), Indian journalist
- Subramaniam Iswaran (born 1962), Singaporean politician
- Subramaniam Sathasivam (born 1953), Malaysian politician
- Subramaniam Sinniah (1944–2022), Malaysian politician
- Subramaniam Siva, Indian film director
- Subramanian (GC) (died 1944), Indian soldier and George Cross recipient
- Subramaniya Siva (1884–1925), Indian writer
- Subramanya Nagarajarao, Indian author
- T. Subramanian, Indian politician
- T. R. Subramaniam (1929–2013), Indian musician
- T. S. R. Subramanian, Indian civil servant
- V. Subramanian, Indian politician
- V. M. Subramanian, Indian politician
- V. N. Subramanian, Indian politician
- Venkataraman Subramanya (born 1936), Indian cricketer

=== Surname ===
- Amanchi Venkata Subrahmanyam (1957–2013), Indian journalist
- Ambi Subramaniam (born 1991), American musician
- Annapurni Subramaniam, Indian physicist
- Arun Subramanian (born 1979), American judge
- Arundhathi Subramaniam, Indian poet
- Arvind Subramanian, Indian economist
- Avanidhar Subrahmanyam, American academic
- Babu Subramaniam, American television director
- Bachimanchi Venkata Subrahmanyam Ravi (born 1974), Indian writer
- Batlagundu Subramanian Ramiah (1905–1983), Indian writer
- Bindu Subramaniam, American musician
- Bouloussou Soubramanion Sastroulou (1866–1941), Indian judge
- Chittoor Subramaniam Pillai (1898–1975), Indian musician
- Chittur Subramanian Venkiteswaran (born 1956), Indian film critic
- Chitra Subramaniam, Indian journalist
- Dasari Subrahmanyam (born 1932), Indian author
- Dharmavarapu Subramanyam (1963–2013), Indian film actor and director
- Gopal Subramaniam, Indian lawyer
- Kavita Subramaniam, Indian film playback singer
- Krishna Subramanian, American businessman
- Kumar Subramaniam (born 1979), Malaysian hockey player
- Manayangath Subramanian Viswanathan (1928–2015), Indian composer
- Mani Subramanian, Indian businessman
- Marti G. Subrahmanyam, Indian academic
- Murugesvaran Subramaniam, Warrant Officer of the Royal Air Force
- Namini Subrahmanyam Naidu, Indian author
- Natty Subramaniam, Indian cinematographer
- Padma Subrahmanyam (born 1943), Indian dancer
- Padmanabhan Subramanian Poti (1923–1998), Indian judge
- Palani Subramaniam Pillai (1908–1962), Indian musician
- Parivakkam Subramaniam Veeraraghavan (born 1948), Indian space scientist
- Ramya Subramanian, Indian actress
- Ravi Subramanyam, Indian cricket umpire
- Ravi Subramanian, Indian author
- Samanth Subramanian, Indian writer
- Sanjay Subrahmanyam (born 1961), Indian historian
- Sanjay Subrahmanyan (born 1968), Indian musician
- Shashank Subramanyam, Indian musician
- Shiv Kumar Subramaniam, Indian actor
- Siva Subrahmanyam Banda (born 1951), American engineer
- Subrahmanyam Jaishankar (born 1955), Indian diplomat
- Subrahmanyan Chandrasekhar (1910–1995), Indian physicist
- Subramania Bharati (1882–1921), Indian writer
- Subramaniam Badrinath (born 1980), Indian cricketer
- Subramaniam Kunanlan (born 1986), Malaysian footballer
- Subramaniam Mohanadas, Sri Lankan chemist and academic
- Subramaniam Pillai, Indian politician
- Subramaniam Ramachandran, Sri Lankan journalist
- Subramaniam Ramadorai (born 1945), Indian engineer
- Subramaniam Sivapalan (c1890–1960), Ceylonese politician
- Subramaniam V. Iyer (born 1957), Indian businessman
- Subramaniam Veenod (born 1988), Malaysian footballer
- Subramanian Anand (born 1986), Sri Lankan cricketer
- Subramanian Arun Prasad (born 1988), Indian chess player
- Subramanian Krishnamoorthy (1929–2014), Indian author
- Sivapragasam Subramaniam (1970–1990), Malaysian murder victim
- Subramanian Swamy (born 1939), Indian politician
- Subramanyan Ramaswamy, Indian politician
- Sunil Subramaniam (born 1967), Indian cricketer
- Tekur Subramanyam, Indian politician
- Vidya Subramaniam (born 1957), Indian author
- Vidya Subramanian, Indian musician
- Vijayalakshmy Subramaniam, Indian singer
- Viji Subramaniam (1952–1995), Indian musician
- Vincent Subramaniam (born 1955), Singaporean football coach

== Other uses ==
=== Films ===
- Ganesha Subramanya, 1992 Kannada film
- Ravi Subramanyam, 2014 Telugu film
- Santosh Subramaniam, 2008 Tamil film
- Subramanyam for Sale, 2015 Telugu film
- Subramaniya Swamy, 1994 Tamil film
- Yevade Subramanyam, 2015 Telugu film

=== Characters ===
- Caleb Subramanian, a character introduced in Season 4 of The Walking Dead.

=== Places ===
- Subramanya, Karnataka, village in Karnataka
- Subramanyapuram, village in Tamil Nadu

=== Temples ===
- Thiruparankundram Subramaniya Swamy temple, Madurai, Tamil Nadu
- Thiruchendur Subramaniya Swamy temple, Tamil Nadu
- Thiruttani Subramaniya Swamy temple, Tamil Nadu
- Ghati Subramanya, Karnataka
- Kukke Subramanya Temple, Karnataka
