= V. P. B. Paramasivam =

Indian politician (born 1980)

Member of Tamil Nadu Legislative Assembly
- In office 23 May 2016 – 3 May 2021
- Preceded by: S. Palanichamy
- Succeeded by: S. Gandhirajan
- Constituency: Vedasandur

AIADMK Tamil Nadu State Youth wing Secretary
- Incumbent
- Assumed office 25 July 2020
- Preceded by: M. Paranjothi

AIADMK Dindigul District Deputy Secretary
- In office 2019–2020

AIADMK Dindigul District Medical Deputy Secretary
- In office 2006–2019

Personal details
- Born: 28 May 1980 (age 46) Dindigul, Tamil Nadu, India
- Party: All India Anna Dravida Munnetra Kazhagam
- Parent: V. P. Balasubramanian (father)
- Occupation: Orthopedic Doctor, Politician

Dr. V. P. Balasubramanian Paramasivam is an orthopedic doctor and politician who represented as a Member of the Legislative Assembly (MLA) from Vedansandur, Tamil Nadu during the 15th Tamil Nadu Assembly (2016-2021).

== Personal life ==
Dr. V. P. B. Paramasivam is married to a Government Service Pediatrician and has two sons. He has one brother (Dr. V. P. B. Maharajan) who is a General Surgeon and works with the Government of Tamilnadu Health Department.

== Contribution to Medical Field ==
VPB Memorial Ortho and Speciality Hospital was founded by Dr. V. P. B. Paramasivam at Pandian Nagar, Dindigul in memory of his late father V. P. Balasubramanian.

== Contribution as Member of Legislative Assembly ==
Dr. V. P. B. Paramasivam brought in many new infrastructure development schemes for the constituency during his tenure.

== Contribution to Government and Governance ==
Dr. V. P. B. Paramasivam was appointed a member of multiple committees in the 15th Tamilnadu Legislative Assemblies.

S.No.	Committee	Membership	Type	Year(s)
1	Estimates	Member	Financial	2017-2018
2	Public Accounts	Member	Financial	2018-2020

Dr. V. P. B. Paramasivam was appointed a member of the Fourth Police Commission, Tamilnadu in the year 2019.

Dr. V. P. B. Paramasivam was nominated for the Board of Management at Tamilnadu Veterinary and Animal Sciences University as the representative from 15th Tamil Nadu Assembly (2016-2021).

== Elections contested ==
Elections	Constituency	Party	Result	Vote percentage	Opposition Candidate	Opposition Party	Opposition vote percentage
2016 Tamil Nadu state assembly election	Vedasandur	AIADMK	Won	49.13	Siva Sakthivel Goundar	Congress	39.09
2021 Tamil Nadu state assembly election	Vedasandur	AIADMK	Lost	41.73	S. Gandhirajan	DMK	49.97
