= Nanguneri Assembly constituency =

One of the 234 State Legislative Assembly Constituencies in Tamil Nadu, in India

Coordinates: 8.48°N 77.67°E

Nanguneri
- Constituency No. 227 for the Tamil Nadu Legislative Assembly

Constituency details
- Country: India
- Region: South India
- State: Tamil Nadu
- District: Tirunelveli
- Lok Sabha constituency: Tirunelveli
- Established: 1951
- Total electors: 2,57,480

Member of Legislative Assembly
- 17th Tamil Nadu Legislative Assembly
- Incumbent Reddiarpatti V. Narayanan
- Party: TVK
- Alliance: TVK+
- Elected year: 2026

Nanguneri is an assembly constituency located in Tirunelveli district in Tamil Nadu. It falls under Tirunelveli Lok Sabha constituency. It is one of the 234 State Legislative Assembly Constituencies in Tamil Nadu, in India.

== Members of Legislative Assembly ==
Year	Member	Political party
Madras State
1952	M. G. Sankar	Indian National Congress
1957	M. G. Sankar	Indian National Congress
1962	M. G. Sankar	Indian National Congress
1967	N. Duraipandian	Indian National Congress
Tamil Nadu
1971	T. Ganapathy	Dravida Munnetra Kazhagam
1977	M. John Vincent	Janata Party
1980	M. John Vincent	All India Anna Dravida Munnetra Kazhagam
1984	M. John Vincent	All India Anna Dravida Munnetra Kazhagam
1989	M. Mani Achiyur	Dravida Munnetra Kazhagam
1991	V. Paulraj Natesan	All India Anna Dravida Munnetra Kazhagam
1996	S. V. Krishnan	Communist Party of India
2001	S. Manickaraj	All India Anna Dravida Munnetra Kazhagam
2006	H. Vasanthakumar	Indian National Congress
2011	A. Narayanan	All India Anna Dravida Munnetra Kazhagam
2016	H. Vasanthakumar	Indian National Congress
2019 (Note: H. Vasanthakumar resigned as the Congress MLA from Nanguneri in May 2019 to contest and win the Kanyakumari Lok Sabha seat, thereby triggering a by-election in Nanguneri.)	V. Narayanan	All India Anna Dravida Munnetra Kazhagam
2021	Ruby R. Manoharan	Indian National Congress
2026	V. Narayanan	Tamilaga Vettri Kazhagam

== Election results ==
Vote share of winning candidates
2026	35.79%
2021	39.43%
2019 by-election	55.88%
2016	43.45%
2011	45.91%
2006	51.76%
2001	51.54%
1996	40.27%
1991	72.90%
1989	31.87%
1984	58.00%
1980	52.18%
1977	27.71%
1971	53.42%
1967	53.34%
1962	43.97%
1957	50.15%
1952	51.77%

=== 2026 ===
2026 Tamil Nadu Legislative Assembly election: Nanguneri
Party	Candidate	Votes	%	±%
TVK	Reddiarpatti V. Narayanan	74,952	35.79	New
INC	Ruby R. Manoharan	58,533	27.95	▼11.79
AMMK	R. Esakkimuthu	38,316	18.30	▲1.61
PT	Tamilselvi	11,141	5.32	New
Independent	M. Kumar	1,098	0.52	New
All India Puratchi Thalaivar Makkal Munnetra Kazhagam	Dr. S. Vellai Durai	1,048	0.50	New
NOTA	NOTA	721	0.34	▼0.46
BSP	R. Janarthanan	659	0.31	New
Independent	S. Mariyappan	637	0.30	New
Independent	A. Rani Nadar Alias Pushparani	529	0.25	New
TVK	Chithirai Selvan	491	0.23	New
Independent	Thanithangam	441	0.21	New
Thamizhaka Padaippalar Makkal Katchi	Krish. Mariappan	377	0.18	New
Puthiya Makkal Tamil Desam Katchi	Thulasi Sudalai	366	0.17	New
Independent	T. Sankar	360	0.17	New
Independent	Shanmugam	293	0.14	New
Independent	Dev. P. Jegadeesan	265	0.13	New
Independent	N. Kalaberumal	265	0.13	New
Independent	M. Aruna	251	0.12	New
Naam Indiar Party	S. Shunmuga Sundaram	202	0.10	New
Independent	Sudaroli S. Murugan Yadhav B.Com	191	0.09	New
Independent	T. Lingadurai	178	0.08	New
Independent	Nallakkannu Alias Karthic. K	170	0.08	New
Independent	R. Ananthi	169	0.08	New
Independent	T. Rajkumar	148	0.07	New
Margin of victory		16,419	7.84	▼0.79
Turnout		2,09,419	81.33	▲12.53
Registered electors		2,57,480		▼20,098
TVK gain from INC		Swing	▲35.79	

=== 2021 ===
2021 Tamil Nadu Legislative Assembly election: Nanguneri
Party	Candidate	Votes	%	±%
INC	Ruby R. Manoharan	75,902	39.74%	−3.7
AIADMK	N. Ganesaraja	59,416	31.11%	−2.3
AMMK	S. Paramasiva Iyyappan	31,870	16.69%	New
NOTA	NOTA	1,537	0.80%	−0.01
Independent	T. Kathiravan	1,154	0.60%	New
Margin of victory		16,486	8.63%	−1.41%
Turnout		190,985	68.80%	−2.54%
Rejected ballots		615	0.32%	
Registered electors		277,578		
INC gain from AIADMK		Swing	-15.64%	

=== 2019 by-election ===
2019 Tamil Nadu Legislative Assembly by-elections: Nanguneri
Party	Candidate	Votes	%	±%
AIADMK	V. Reddiarpatti Narayanan	95,377	55.88	
INC	Ruby R. Manoharan	61,932	36.28	
IND	A. Hari Nadar	4,243	2.49	
Majority		33,445	19.59	
Turnout		1,70,687	66.31	
AIADMK gain from INC		Swing		

=== 2016 ===
2016 Tamil Nadu Legislative Assembly election: Nanguneri
Party	Candidate	Votes	%	±%
INC	H. Vasanthakumar	74,932	43.45%	+6.14
AIADMK	M. Vijayakumar	57,617	33.41%	−12.51
AIFB	S. Suresh Alias Kasinivendan	14,203	8.24%	New
DMDK	K. Jeyabalan	9,446	5.48%	New
BJP	V. Manikandan	6,609	3.83%	+0.12
Independent	V. Essakkimuthu	1,903	1.10%	New
NOTA	NOTA	1,399	0.81%	New
Margin of victory		17,315	10.04%	1.43%
Turnout		172,470	71.35%	−3.45%
Registered electors		241,732		
INC gain from AIADMK		Swing	-2.47%	

=== 2011 ===
2011 Tamil Nadu Legislative Assembly election: Nanguneri
Party	Candidate	Votes	%	±%
AIADMK	A. Narayanan	65,510	45.91%	+13.34
INC	H. Vasanthakumar	53,230	37.31%	−14.45
JMM	T. Dhevanathan Yadav	13,425	9.41%	New
BJP	M. Mahakannan	5,290	3.71%	+2.43
Independent	S. Murugan	2,207	1.55%	New
BSP	M. Ananth	2,075	1.45%	−0.33
Independent	V. Senaidurainadar	940	0.66%	New
Margin of victory		12,280	8.61%	−10.57%
Turnout		190,748	74.80%	9.13%
Registered electors		142,677		
AIADMK gain from INC		Swing	-5.84%	

=== 2006 ===
2006 Tamil Nadu Legislative Assembly election: Nanguneri
Party	Candidate	Votes	%	±%
INC	H. Vasanthakumar	54,170	51.76%	New
AIADMK	S. P. Sooriyakumar	34,095	32.58%	−18.97
AIFB	R. Sankar	6,869	6.56%	New
DMDK	I. Packia Raj	2,700	2.58%	New
Independent	A. Navaneetha Krishnan	1,964	1.88%	New
BSP	U. Pandy	1,872	1.79%	New
BJP	Nellai R. Sollalagan	1,335	1.28%	New
Independent	K. Youkendran	908	0.87%	New
Margin of victory		20,075	19.18%	9.05%
Turnout		104,665	65.66%	13.74%
Registered electors		159,393		
INC gain from AIADMK		Swing	0.21%	

=== 2001 ===
2001 Tamil Nadu Legislative Assembly election: Nanguneri
Party	Candidate	Votes	%	±%
AIADMK	S. Manickaraj	46,619	51.54%	+14.67
MTD	V. Ramachandran	37,458	41.41%	New
MDMK	Tamil Mani Noble	2,942	3.25%	−3.22
Independent	P. Essakkipandi	1,711	1.89%	New
Independent	Ratnaraj	965	1.07%	New
Independent	R. Bothiraj	755	0.83%	New
Margin of victory		9,161	10.13%	6.73%
Turnout		90,450	51.93%	−8.48%
Registered electors		174,269		
AIADMK gain from CPI		Swing	11.27%	

=== 1996 ===
1996 Tamil Nadu Legislative Assembly election: Nanguneri
Party	Candidate	Votes	%	±%
CPI	S. V. Krishnan	37,342	40.27%	New
AIADMK	A. S. A. Karunakaran	34,193	36.87%	−36.03
MDMK	R. Vamadevan	6,002	6.47%	New
BJP	M. Jeyakumar	5,349	5.77%	New
Independent	Uma Sankar	3,890	4.19%	New
AIIC(T)	P. Muthiah Swamy Dassan	2,144	2.31%	New
Independent	P. Chandrasekaran	1,139	1.23%	New
Margin of victory		3,149	3.40%	−45.81%
Turnout		92,737	60.40%	1.86%
Registered electors		162,580		
CPI gain from AIADMK		Swing	-32.63%	

=== 1991 ===
1991 Tamil Nadu Legislative Assembly election: Nanguneri
Party	Candidate	Votes	%	±%
AIADMK	V. Paulraj Natesan	65,514	72.90%	+52.26
DMK	M. Mani Achiyur	21,294	23.69%	−8.17
PMK	C. Ramasamy	1,292	1.44%	New
Margin of victory		44,220	49.20%	47.63%
Turnout		89,870	58.54%	−9.26%
Registered electors		157,676		
AIADMK gain from DMK		Swing	41.03%	

=== 1989 ===
1989 Tamil Nadu Legislative Assembly election: Nanguneri
Party	Candidate	Votes	%	±%
DMK	M. Mani Achiyur	30,222	31.87%	−8.39
INC	P. Sironmani	28,729	30.29%	New
AIADMK	A. S. A. Karunagaran	19,576	20.64%	−37.35
Independent	D. Selvin Kumar	8,566	9.03%	New
AIADMK	Y. S. M. Yusuf	6,408	6.76%	−51.24
Margin of victory		1,493	1.57%	−16.17%
Turnout		94,837	67.80%	−0.60%
Registered electors		142,173		
DMK gain from AIADMK		Swing	-26.13%	

=== 1984 ===
1984 Tamil Nadu Legislative Assembly election: Nanguneri
Party	Candidate	Votes	%	±%
AIADMK	M. John Vincent	45,825	58.00%	+5.82
DMK	E. Namdi	31,807	40.25%	New
Independent	J. Devasahayam	469	0.59%	New
Independent	A. Pitchai	418	0.53%	New
Margin of victory		14,018	17.74%	11.99%
Turnout		79,014	68.41%	8.60%
Registered electors		122,639		
AIADMK hold		Swing	5.82%	

=== 1980 ===
1980 Tamil Nadu Legislative Assembly election: Nanguneri
Party	Candidate	Votes	%	±%
AIADMK	M. John Vincent	36,725	52.18%	+24.77
INC	J. Thangaraj	32,676	46.43%	+27.31
Independent	G. Subba Reddiar	440	0.63%	New
Margin of victory		4,049	5.75%	5.45%
Turnout		70,383	59.80%	3.27%
Registered electors		119,072		
AIADMK gain from JP		Swing	24.46%	

=== 1977 ===
1977 Tamil Nadu Legislative Assembly election: Nanguneri
Party	Candidate	Votes	%	±%
JP	M. John Vincent	18,668	27.71%	New
AIADMK	D. Veliah	18,464	27.41%	New
INC	M. Rajagopalan	12,877	19.12%	−27.46
DMK	S. Sudalaiyandi	9,381	13.93%	−39.49
Independent	V. Periasamy	7,485	11.11%	New
Independent	M. Vallinayagam	484	0.72%	New
Margin of victory		204	0.30%	−6.53%
Turnout		67,359	56.54%	−10.54%
Registered electors		120,256		
JP gain from DMK		Swing	-25.70%	

=== 1971 ===
1971 Tamil Nadu Legislative Assembly election: Nanguneri
Party	Candidate	Votes	%	±%
DMK	T. Ganapathy	33,099	53.42%	+6.76
INC	S. T. Thavasikani	28,863	46.58%	−6.76
Margin of victory		4,236	6.84%	0.15%
Turnout		61,962	67.07%	−2.63%
Registered electors		97,502		
DMK gain from INC		Swing	0.07%	

=== 1967 ===
1967 Madras Legislative Assembly election: Nanguneri
Party	Candidate	Votes	%	±%
INC	N. Duraipandian	33,269	53.34%	+9.38
DMK	T. G. Nadar	29,097	46.66%	New
Margin of victory		4,172	6.69%	−1.53%
Turnout		62,366	69.70%	−7.15%
Registered electors		92,044		
INC hold		Swing	9.38%	

=== 1962 ===
1962 Madras Legislative Assembly election: Nanguneri
Party	Candidate	Votes	%	±%
INC	M. G. Sankar	28,548	43.97%	−6.18
SWA	S. Madasamy	23,211	35.75%	New
CPI	P. Muthumanickam	9,996	15.40%	New
We Tamils	S. Muthiah Nadar	3,173	4.89%	New
Margin of victory		5,337	8.22%	−3.03%
Turnout		64,928	76.85%	24.92%
Registered electors		86,398		
INC hold		Swing	-6.18%	

=== 1957 ===
1957 Madras Legislative Assembly election: Nanguneri
Party	Candidate	Votes	%	±%
INC	M. G. Sankar	21,786	50.15%	−1.62
Independent	S. Madasami	16,898	38.90%	New
Independent	E. Thothadri	3,336	7.68%	New
Independent	Kumarasami	1,425	3.28%	New
Margin of victory		4,888	11.25%	−14.91%
Turnout		43,445	51.93%	−11.65%
Registered electors		83,654		
INC hold		Swing	-1.62%	

=== 1952 ===
1952 Madras Legislative Assembly election: Nanguneri
Party	Candidate	Votes	%	±%
INC	M. G. Sankar	24,849	51.77%	New
Independent	S. Madasami	12,289	25.60%	New
CPI	Gnamuthu	8,076	16.82%	New
Independent	V. N. Kanthayya	2,789	5.81%	New
Margin of victory		12,560	26.17%	
Turnout		48,003	63.58%	
Registered electors		75,499		
INC win (new seat)				
