= E. Subaya =

Indian politician

Esakki Subaya

Member of the Tamil Nadu Legislative Assembly
- In office 12 May 2021 – 26 May 2026
- Preceded by: R. Murugaiah Pandian
- Constituency: Ambasamudram
- In office 16 May 2011 – 22 May 2016
- Preceded by: R. Avudaiyappan
- Succeeded by: R. Murugaiah Pandian
- Constituency: Ambasamudram

Minister for Law, Courts and Prisons
- In office 16 May 2011 – 3 July 2011
- Preceded by: Durai Murugan
- Succeeded by: G. Senthamizhan

Personal details
- Party: Tamilaga Vettri Kazhagam (since 26 May 2026)
- Other political affiliations: All India Anna Dravida Munnetra Kazhagam (until 26 May 2026)

E. Subaya, popularly known as Esakki Subaya is an Indian politician and the incumbent member of the Tamil Nadu Legislative Assembly representing the Ambasamudram constituency. He is affiliated with the All India Anna Dravida Munnetra Kazhagam (AIADMK) party.

In July 2011, E. Subaya was dismissed from the position of Minister for Law, Courts, and Prisons by Chief Minister Jayalalithaa. His successor, G. Senthamizhan, was also dismissed in November of the same year.

Esakki Subaya won from Ambasamudram in 2026 Election and on 26 May 2026 tendered his resignation from the Tamil Nadu Assembly to join TVK.

== Electoral performance ==
Election	Constituency	Political party	Result	Vote %	Opposition			Ref
Election	Constituency	Political party	Result	Vote %	Candidate	Political party	Vote %	Ref
2011	Ambasamudram	AIADMK	Won	55.11%	R. Avudaiyappan	DMK	38.19%	
2021	Ambasamudram	AIADMK	Won	48.41%	R. Avudaiyappan	DMK	38.80%	-
2026	Ambasamudram	AIADMK	Won	34.30%	V. P. Durai	INC	28.95%	-
