= P. Veldurai =

Indian politician (1949–2023)

P. Veldurai (30 November 1949 – 24 October 2023) was an Indian politician and Member of the Legislative Assembly (MLA). He was elected to the Tamil Nadu legislative assembly as an Indian National Congress candidate from Cheranmadevi constituency in the 1996 and 2006 elections. P. Veldurai died on 24 October 2023, at the age of 73.

== Controversy ==
P. Veldurai courted controversy during his tenure as MLA as in 2011 the Supreme Court held that his election from Cheranmahadevi constituency in May 2006 was illegal, null and void, as he was a registered government civil contractor at the time of filing nominations and his registration had not been cancelled as per law. Veldurai was asked to repay ₹ 21.58 lakh that he'd drawn as salary, which he contested in the court of law. Finally, he was subject of a landmark judgement of the Madras High Court on 26 February 2019 that held that Members of Parliament (MPs) as well as MLAs are liable to be asked to repay salaries and other emoluments, along with penalty, if a court of law declares their election to be illegal, null and void either before or after the completion of their tenure.

== Electoral performance ==
2006 Tamil Nadu Legislative Assembly election: Cheranmadevi
Party	Candidate	Votes	%	±%
INC	P. Veldurai	48,527	43.72%	New
AIADMK	P. H. Manoj Pandian	42,495	38.29%	−15.23
DMDK	S. Rajendra Nathan	8,122	7.32%	New
AIFB	A. Paramasivan	5,966	5.37%	New
BSP	S. Udayakumar	1,920	1.73%	New
BJP	P. Arumuganainar	1,626	1.46%	−40.27
RLD	R. Achuthan	1,055	0.95%	New
Independent	A. Paulrathinam	805	0.73%	New
Margin of victory		6,032	5.43%	−6.34%
Turnout		110,996	69.85%	9.52%
Registered electors		158,911		
INC gain from AIADMK		Swing	-9.79%	

1996 Tamil Nadu Legislative Assembly election: Cheranmadevi
Party	Candidate	Votes	%	±%
TMC(M)	P. Veldurai	39,004	39.41%	New
Independent	P. H. Pandian	26,897	27.18%	New
AIADMK	M. R. Janarthanan	18,002	18.19%	−47.25
CPI(M)	S. K. Palanichamy	6,296	6.36%	New
Independent	S. Mariyasundaram	2,405	2.43%	New
Independent	M. Susindran	2,179	2.20%	New
BJP	S. Muthappa	1,985	2.01%	New
Independent	M. Raj	629	0.64%	New
Margin of victory		12,107	12.23%	−25.77%
Turnout		98,977	71.69%	4.63%
Registered electors		145,196		
TMC(M) gain from AIADMK		Swing	-26.03%	

1989 Tamil Nadu Legislative Assembly election: Cheranmadevi
Party	Candidate	Votes	%	±%
AIADMK	P. H. Pandian	26,113	27.06%	−40.39
DMK	R. Avudaiappan	25,413	26.34%	−5.31
INC	P. Veldurai	23,270	24.12%	New
AIADMK	T. P. S. H. Amarnath Prapahar Ram Sait	20,409	21.15%	−46.3
Margin of victory		700	0.73%	−35.08%
Turnout		96,494	78.60%	0.92%
Registered electors		124,735		
AIADMK hold		Swing	-40.39%	
