= Vedasandur Assembly constituency =

One of the 234 State Legislative Assembly Constituencies in Tamil Nadu, in India

Coordinates: 10°31′49″N 77°55′22″E

Vedasandur
- Constituency No. 133 for the Tamil Nadu Legislative Assembly

Constituency details
- Country: India
- Region: South India
- State: Tamil Nadu
- District: Dindigul
- Lok Sabha constituency: Karur
- Established: 1951
- Total electors: 2,43,998
- Reservation: None

Member of Legislative Assembly
- 17th Tamil Nadu Legislative Assembly
- Incumbent Saminathan.T
- Party: DMK
- Elected year: 2026

Vedasandur is a legislative assembly constituency in Dindigul district in the Indian state of Tamil Nadu. Its State Assembly Constituency number is 133. It comes under Karur Lok Sabha constituency for parliament elections. It is one of the 234 State Legislative Assembly Constituencies in Tamil Nadu, in India. Elections and winners from this constituency are listed below.

== Members of Legislative Assembly ==
Year	Member	Political party
Madras State
1952	V. Madanagopal	Communist Party of India
1957	T. S. Soundram	Indian National Congress
1962	S. Nanjunda Rao	Indian National Congress
1967	N. Varadarajan	Communist Party of India (Marxist)
Tamil Nadu
1971	P. Muthusamy	Dravida Munnetra Kazhagam
1977	S. M. Vasan	All India Anna Dravida Munnetra Kazhagam
1980	V. P. Balasubramanian	All India Anna Dravida Munnetra Kazhagam
1984	V. P. Balasubramanian	All India Anna Dravida Munnetra Kazhagam
1989	P. Muthusamy	All India Anna Dravida Munnetra Kazhagam (JA)
1991	S. Gandhirajan	All India Anna Dravida Munnetra Kazhagam
1996	S. V. Krishnan	Dravida Munnetra Kazhagam
2001	P. Andivel	All India Anna Dravida Munnetra Kazhagam
2006	M. Dhandapani	Indian National Congress
2011	S. Palanichamy	All India Anna Dravida Munnetra Kazhagam
2016	V. P. B. Paramasivam	All India Anna Dravida Munnetra Kazhagam
2021	S. Gandhirajan	Dravida Munnetra Kazhagam
2026	T. Saminathan	Dravida Munnetra Kazhagam

== Election results ==
Vote share of winning candidates
2026	37.50%
2021	50.45%
2016	49.13%
2011	61.92%
2006	46.16%
2001	49.01%
1996	43.98%
1991	76.47%
1989	29.72%
1984	55.48%
1980	63.89%
1977	37.21%
1971	54.18%
1967	48.16%
1962	48.58%
1957	50.64%
1952	51.52%

=== 2026 ===
2026 Tamil Nadu Legislative Assembly election: Vedasandur
Party	Candidate	Votes	%	±%
DMK	Saminathan.T	84,948	37.50	▼12.95
AIADMK	V. P. B. Paramasivam	74,885	33.05	▼9.08
TVK	Dr.N. Nakajothi	56,804	25.07	New
NTK	Khaja Hussain Ahamed.A	7,095	3.13	▼0.89
Independent	Murugan.V	727	0.32	New
NOTA	NOTA	474	0.21	
Independent	Marimuthu.S	355	0.16	New
Independent	Manikandaprabhu.N C	294	0.13	New
Independent	Maneeshankar.M.G	205	0.09	New
Samaniya Makkal Nala Katchi	Boomiraj.K	184	0.08	New
CPI(ML)L	Ravi.R	153	0.07	New
TVK	Ramesh.T	131	0.06	New
Independent	Selvaraj.V	94	0.04	New
Independent	Natchimuthu.R	78	0.03	New
Independent	Suresh.B	72	0.03	New
Independent	Dhivakar.A	55	0.02	New
Margin of victory		10,063	4.45	▼3.87
Turnout		2,26,554	92.85	▲12.69
Registered electors		2,43,998		▼19,313
DMK hold		Swing	▼12.95	

=== 2021 ===
2021 Tamil Nadu Legislative Assembly election: Vedasandur
Party	Candidate	Votes	%	±%
DMK	S. Gandhirajan	106,481	50.45	New
AIADMK	V. P. B. Paramasivam	88,928	42.13	−7
NTK	R. Pothumani	8,495	4.02	New
AMMK	P. Ramasamy	2,041	0.97	New
Independent	B. Palanichamy	1,293	0.61	New
MNM	S. Vetrivel	1,215	0.58	New
Margin of victory		17,553	8.32	−1.73
Turnout		211,065	80.16	−0.38
Rejected ballots		157	0.07	
Registered electors		263,311		
DMK gain from AIADMK		Swing	1.32	

=== 2016 ===
2016 Tamil Nadu Legislative Assembly election: Vedasandur
Party	Candidate	Votes	%	±%
AIADMK	V. P. B. Paramasivam	97,555	49.13	−12.79
INC	R. Sivasakthivel Gounder	77,617	39.09	+7.21
DMDK	S. R. K. Balu	12,445	6.27	New
Independent	R. Kannan	2,512	1.27	New
NOTA	NOTA	2,256	1.14	New
BSP	M. Palanichamy	1,264	0.64	−0.34
Independent	S. Vengadash	1,206	0.61	New
Margin of victory		19,938	10.04	−20.01
Turnout		198,558	80.54	0.86
Registered electors		246,548		
AIADMK hold		Swing	-12.79	

=== 2011 ===
2011 Tamil Nadu Legislative Assembly election: Vedasandur
Party	Candidate	Votes	%	±%
AIADMK	S. Palanichamy	104,511	61.92	+25.64
INC	M. Dhandapani	53,799	31.88	−14.29
Independent	P. Varatharaj	2,018	1.20	New
Independent	N. Rajan	1,643	0.97	New
BSP	M. Palanichamy	1,640	0.97	+0
BJP	M. Raman	1,635	0.97	−0.49
Independent	R. Lakshmi	1,259	0.75	New
Margin of victory		50,712	30.05	20.17
Turnout		168,772	79.68	8.61
Registered electors		211,823		
AIADMK gain from INC		Swing	15.76	

=== 2006 ===
2006 Tamil Nadu Legislative Assembly election: Vedasandur
Party	Candidate	Votes	%	±%
INC	M. Dhandapani	68,953	46.16	New
AIADMK	S. Palanichamy	54,195	36.28	−12.73
DMDK	S. Venkatachalam	16,693	11.18	New
Independent	A. Paraman	2,263	1.52	New
BJP	N. Palanisamy	2,180	1.46	New
BSP	D. Dhayalan	1,445	0.97	New
Independent	P. Selvaraj	802	0.54	New
Margin of victory		14,758	9.88	−4.45
Turnout		149,370	71.06	9.39
Registered electors		210,197		
INC gain from AIADMK		Swing	-2.85	

=== 2001 ===
2001 Tamil Nadu Legislative Assembly election: Vedasandur
Party	Candidate	Votes	%	±%
AIADMK	P. Andivel	65,415	49.01	+20.09
DMK	R. Kavitha Parthipan	46,289	34.68	−9.31
MDMK	S. Karnan	8,381	6.28	−18.24
Thaayaga Makkal Katchi	V. Rethinam	6,984	5.23	New
Independent	P. Sivasubramani Alias Dalit Siva	2,296	1.72	New
Independent	K. Andavan	1,966	1.47	New
JD(U)	A. Karuppanan	1,221	0.91	New
CPI(ML)L	S. Murugesan	923	0.69	New
Margin of victory		19,126	14.33	−0.74
Turnout		133,475	61.67	−4.79
Registered electors		216,457		
AIADMK gain from DMK		Swing	5.02	

=== 1996 ===
1996 Tamil Nadu Legislative Assembly election: Vedasandur
Party	Candidate	Votes	%	±%
DMK	S. V. Krishnan	60,639	43.98	+21.55
AIADMK	S. Gandhirajan	39,870	28.92	−47.55
MDMK	V. P. Balasubramanian	33,802	24.52	New
BJP	H. R. S. Muthukrishnan	733	0.53	New
Margin of victory		20,769	15.06	−38.98
Turnout		137,863	66.46	3.38
Registered electors		216,941		
DMK gain from AIADMK		Swing	-32.49	

=== 1991 ===
1991 Tamil Nadu Legislative Assembly election: Vedasandur
Party	Candidate	Votes	%	±%
AIADMK	S. Gandhirajan	94,937	76.47	+46.75
DMK	P. Muthusamy	27,847	22.43	New
Margin of victory		67,090	54.04	53.34
Turnout		124,147	63.08	−9.37
Registered electors		203,269		
AIADMK hold		Swing	46.75	

=== 1989 ===
1989 Tamil Nadu Legislative Assembly election: Vedasandur
Party	Candidate	Votes	%	±%
AIADMK	P. Muthusamy	37,928	29.72	−25.76
Independent	S. Gandhirajan	37,038	29.02	New
INC	M. Dhandapani	25,742	20.17	New
Independent	V. P. Balasubramaniam	21,045	16.49	New
Independent	Durai Marikannu	3,302	2.59	New
Margin of victory		890	0.70	−24.83
Turnout		127,615	72.45	1.42
Registered electors		180,162		
AIADMK hold		Swing	-25.76	

=== 1984 ===
1984 Tamil Nadu Legislative Assembly election: Vedasandur
Party	Candidate	Votes	%	±%
AIADMK	V. P. Balasubramanian	60,583	55.48	−8.41
DMK	P. Muthusamy	32,714	29.96	New
INC	G. S. Veerappan	13,359	12.23	−23.88
Independent	Marikkannan Durai	983	0.90	New
Independent	P. Sathiyamurthy	837	0.77	New
Margin of victory		27,869	25.52	−2.25
Turnout		109,194	71.03	11.78
Registered electors		162,490		
AIADMK hold		Swing	-8.41	

=== 1980 ===
1980 Tamil Nadu Legislative Assembly election: Vedasandur
Party	Candidate	Votes	%	±%
AIADMK	V. P. Balasubramanian	58,128	63.89	+26.68
INC	G. P. V. Raju	32,857	36.11	+1.46
Margin of victory		25,271	27.77	25.22
Turnout		90,985	59.25	9.10
Registered electors		156,681		
AIADMK hold		Swing	26.68	

=== 1977 ===
1977 Tamil Nadu Legislative Assembly election: Vedasandur
Party	Candidate	Votes	%	±%
AIADMK	Vasan	26,995	37.21	New
INC	S. Nanjunda Row	25,141	34.66	+0.73
JP	R. V. Subbarayalu	9,808	13.52	New
DMK	P. Abdul Kader Sait	6,467	8.91	−45.27
Independent	S. M. J. Ali Mohamad	2,040	2.81	New
Independent	M. Dorai	1,192	1.64	New
Independent	V. M. Moosa	903	1.24	New
Margin of victory		1,854	2.56	−17.70
Turnout		72,546	50.15	−18.45
Registered electors		146,304		
AIADMK gain from DMK		Swing	-16.97	

=== 1971 ===
1971 Tamil Nadu Legislative Assembly election: Vedasandur
Party	Candidate	Votes	%	±%
DMK	P. Muthusamy	36,746	54.18	New
INC	S. Nanjundarow	23,007	33.92	−13.13
CPI(M)	N. Varadarajan	8,068	11.90	−36.26
Margin of victory		13,739	20.26	19.15
Turnout		67,821	68.60	1.37
Registered electors		106,399		
DMK gain from CPI(M)		Swing	6.02	

=== 1967 ===
1967 Madras Legislative Assembly election: Vedasandur
Party	Candidate	Votes	%	±%
CPI(M)	N. Varadarajan	30,063	48.16	New
INC	S. N. Rao	29,372	47.05	−1.53
Independent	T. P. Gowder	1,912	3.06	New
Independent	M. M. Ramasamy	1,079	1.73	New
Margin of victory		691	1.11	−7.24
Turnout		62,426	67.23	−1.82
Registered electors		98,263		
CPI(M) gain from INC		Swing	-0.43	

=== 1962 ===
1962 Madras Legislative Assembly election: Vedasandur
Party	Candidate	Votes	%	±%
INC	S. Nanjunda Roy	30,394	48.58	−2.06
CPI	V. Madanagopal	25,171	40.24	−3.54
DMK	P. Muthusamy	5,558	8.88	New
SWA	S. Subbiah Gounder	1,436	2.30	New
Margin of victory		5,223	8.35	1.48
Turnout		62,559	69.06	12.08
Registered electors		94,573		
INC hold		Swing	-2.06	

=== 1957 ===
1957 Madras Legislative Assembly election: Vedasandur
Party	Candidate	Votes	%	±%
INC	T. S. Soundram Ramachandran	26,312	50.64	+21.76
CPI	V. Madanagopal	22,745	43.78	−7.74
Independent	P. Kandasamy Chetti	2,899	5.58	New
Margin of victory		3,567	6.87	−15.77
Turnout		51,956	56.97	1.56
Registered electors		91,194		
INC gain from CPI		Swing	-0.87	

=== 1952 ===
1952 Madras Legislative Assembly election: Vedasandur
Party	Candidate	Votes	%	±%
CPI	V. Madanagopal	21,012	51.52	New
INC	M. R. Krishnaswami Reddiar	11,779	28.88	New
KMPP	P. N. Govindarajulu Saidu	6,604	16.19	New
Independent	N. Muthuswami Pillai	1,392	3.41	New
Margin of victory		9,233	22.64	
Turnout		40,787	55.41	
Registered electors		73,604		
CPI win (new seat)				
