= M. Mani Achiyur =

Indian politician

M. Mani Achiyur was an Indian politician and former Member of the Legislative Assembly. He was elected to the Tamil Nadu Legislative Assembly as a Dravida Munnetra Kazhagam candidate representing the Nanguneri constituency in the 1989 election.
