= S. Chellapandi =

Indian politician

S. Chellapandian

Member of the Madras State Assembly
- In office 1952–1957
- Preceded by: S. Dasaratharam
- Constituency: Cheranmadevi

Personal details
- Party: Indian National Congress

S. Chellapandian was an Indian politician and former Member of the Legislative Assembly. He was elected to the Tamil Nadu legislative assembly as an Indian National Congress candidate from the Cheranmadevi constituency in the 1952 election.
