= T. Ganapathy =

Indian politician

T. Ganapathy was an Indian politician and former Member of the Legislative Assembly. He was elected to the Tamil Nadu legislative assembly as an Indian National Congress candidate from Palavur constituency in 1952 election.

He was again elected as a Dravida Munnetra Kazhagam candidate from Nanguneri constituency in 1971 election.
