= Vasanth & Co =

Indian retail chain

- Type: Partnership
- Industry: Retail
- Founded: 1978
- Founder: H. Vasanthakumar
- Headquarters: Chennai, Tamil Nadu, India
- Number of locations: 156 (2026)
- Area served: Tamil Nadu, Puducherry
- Key people: V.Tamilselvi (Managing Partner); V.Thangamalar Jaganath (Partner); V.Vijayakumar(alias) Vijayvasanth (Partner); V.Vinothkumar (Partner)
- Products: Consumer Electronics, Home Appliances, Gadgets, Mobiles, Laptops, Furniture
- Revenue: ▲₹1500 Crores US$200million (2021)
- Number of employees: 1200
- Website: vasanthandco.in

Vasanth & Co is a chain dealer of consumer electronics and home appliances in Tamil Nadu, India. The company was founded in 1978 by H. Vasanthakumar.

== Expansion ==
The chain reported a turnover of ₹ 5 billion (100 million US dollars) in the year 2007, which had doubled by 2020.

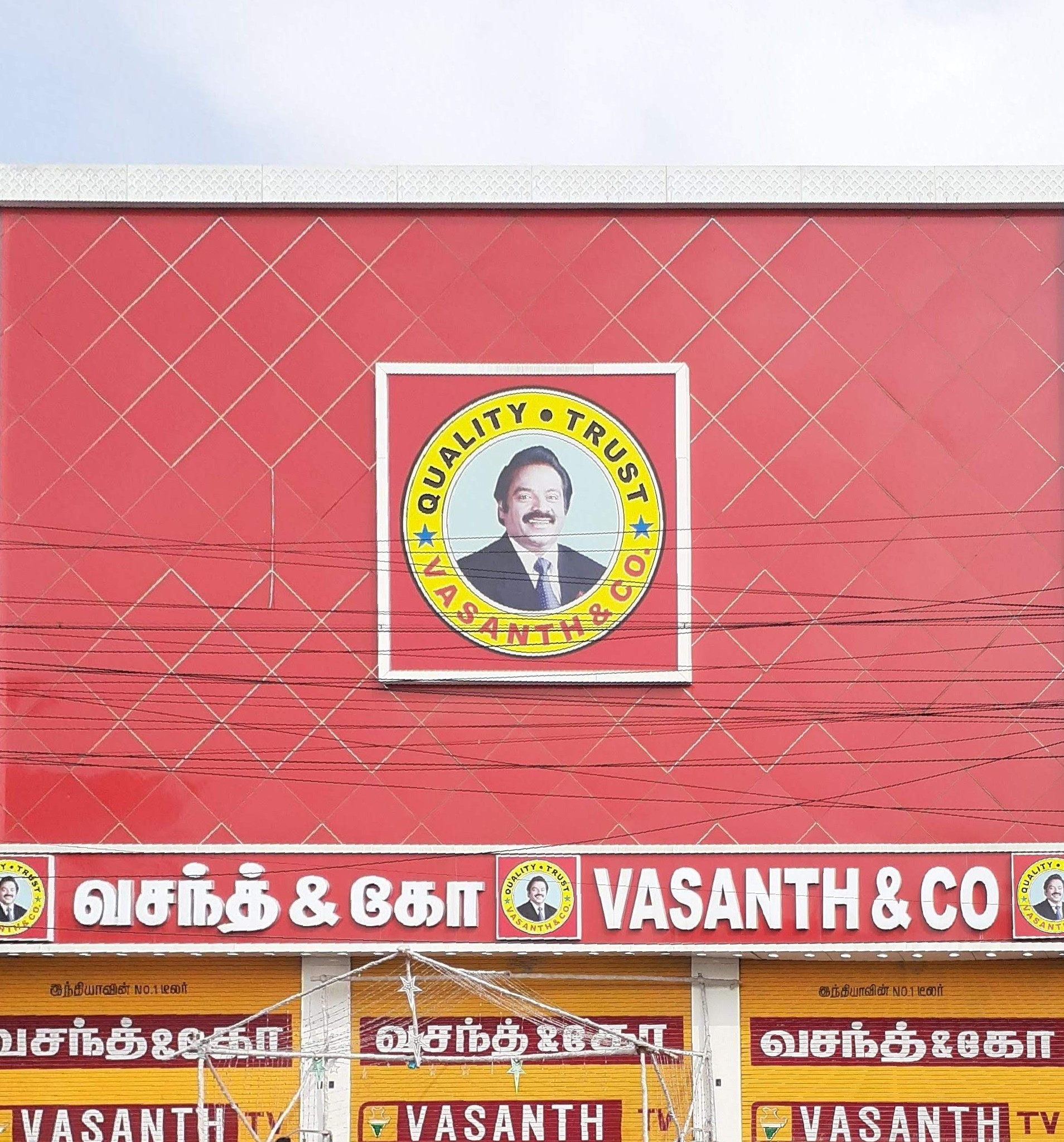
Vasanth & Co., Purasawalkam, Chennai, India

== SAP implementation ==
The company chose to implement the mySAP ERP in 50 of its showrooms.

== See also ==
- Vasanth TV
