= Ratnavel Pandian Subbiah =

The Honourable Justice of Madras High Court Justice R Subbiah
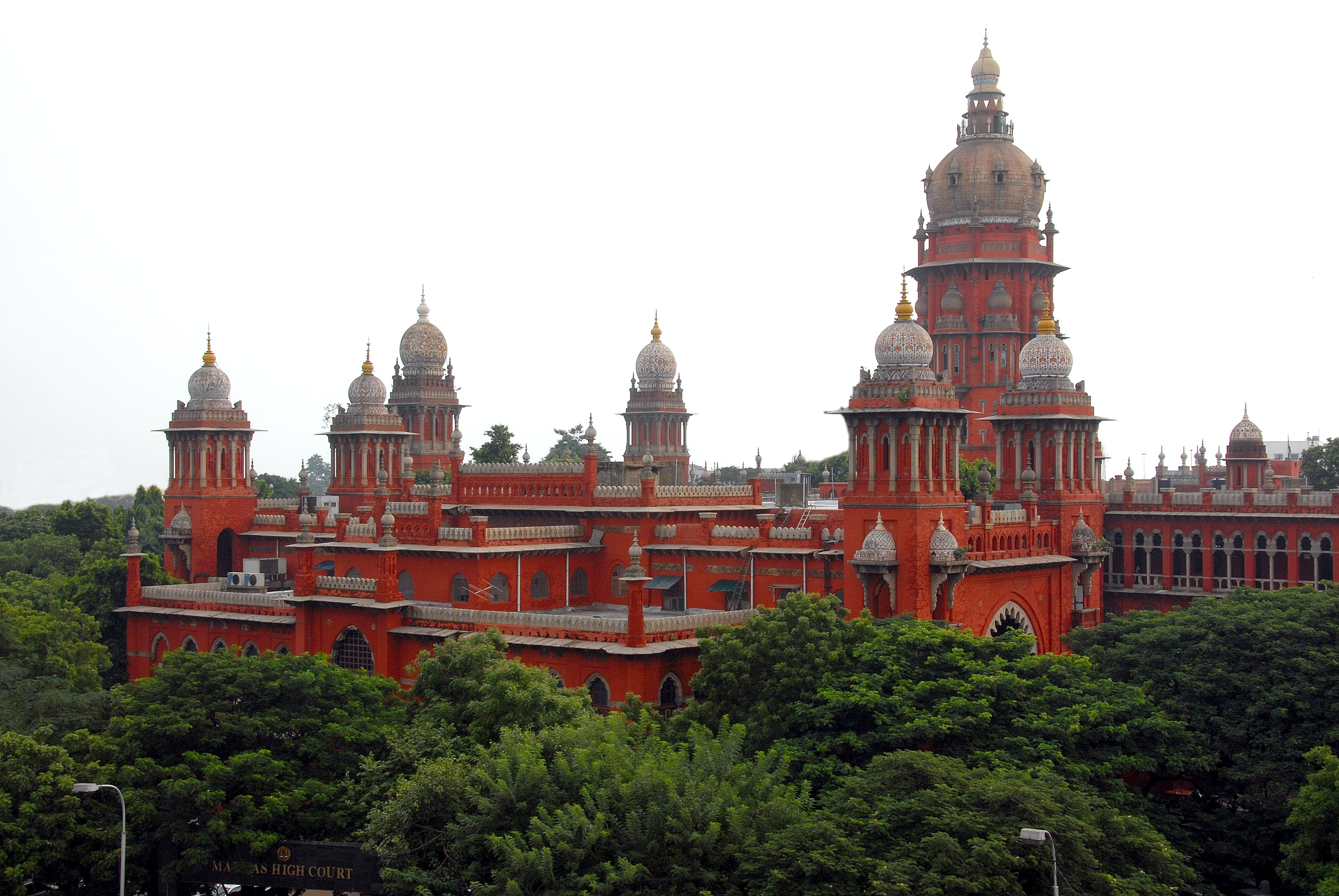

Madras High Court
- Nominated by: Prathiba Patil, the then President of India
- Appointed by: Prathiba Patil, the then President of India

2nd Judge of High Court
- Appointed by: Prathiba Patil, the then President of India

Personal details
- Born: 21 June 1959 (age 67) Thirupudaimaruthur, Tamil Nadu, India
- Parent: Justice S Ratnavel Pandian (father)
- Education: Madras Law College
- Occupation: Justice

Justice Ratnavel Pandian Subbiah is a sitting judge of the Charted High Court of Madras. Subbiah is the Executive Chairman for the Tamil Nadu State Legal Services Authority. He was elevated as a judge of High Court of Madras on 24 March 2008.

Subbiah is the son of retired Supreme Court judge S Rathnavel Pandian. Subbiah was appointed as an Additional judge of the Madras High Court on 24 March 2008 by the President of India, Pratibha Patil.

== Early life ==
Subbiah was born on 21 June 1959. He is the son of Supreme Court Justice S Ratnavel Pandian.

After completing his graduation with a degree in law, from Madras Law College, Subbiah has enrolled as an advocate on 14 December 1983.

== Advocate profession ==
Subbiah had practiced for 23 years in the High Court of Madras in all subjects. He specialized in constitutional, civil, criminal and service matters.

Subbiah worked as a panel advocate for Pondicherry Industrial Promotion and Development Investment Corporation and he worked as a panel advocate for the Chennai Port Trust and for the Bharat Sanchar Nigam Limited (BSNL), Chennai.

Subbiah worked as a standing counsel for the Industrial Promotion Corporation of Tamil Nadu and for various Government Organizations and he worked as special government pleader (CS) Government of Tamil Nadu.

== Judge of High Court ==
Subbiah was appointed as an additional judge of the Madras High Court on 24 March 2008. President of India Srimathi Pratibha Patil issued the warrant to appoint him.

Subbiah was appointed as Permanent Judge of the Madras High Court on 9 November 2009.

== Important orders ==
=== John Doe Order ===
John Doe order is a pre-infringement injunction remedy provided to protect the intellectual property rights of the creator of artistic works like movies, songs, etc. John Doe order is also known as Rolling Anton Pillar, Anton Pillar or Ashok Kumar order.

John Doe Order was passed by Justice R Subbiah in the case relating to the movie Dhammu. This Movie was created by Creative Commercials Media & Entertainment Ltd. and the John Doe order was passed against BSNL and other ISP's restraining them from infringing their copyrights.

=== Corruption Act Order ===
Subbiah and Justice Krishnan Ramaswamy, sitting in a Bench, dismissed a petition filed by a Puduchery Member of Legislative Assembly, challenging his disqualification through an order by the Speaker. The Bench Dismissed the Petition filed by the Petitioner by giving a finding that Corruption was proved before the Special Court and hence, the petitioner has lost his locus to be a Member of Legislative Assembly.

=== Online Gaming Order ===
Subbiah, sitting as a Judge of Madras High Court, refused to stay ordinance banning Online Gambling Games. This order was passed on a petition challenging the Ordinance. The Ordinance was passed, when many youth and students have lost their earning through online Gaming. It was argued on the side of the Petitioner that Rummy is a game of wit. But, the Ordinance already made clear that the online Gaming spoiled the life of youngsters. Following that object for which the Ordinance was promulgated, Subbiah had dismissed the plea.

=== Right to Education Order ===
A challenge was made by CBSE Schools Under the Right to Education Act that the State Government has no right to interfere with the collection of fee. Subbiah, as a member in the Bench, ruled that the State Government is having right to reimburse the Fee Collected under Section 25 of the Right to Education Act. This Act provides free education for the Weaker Section Students, in All Schools and every School should reserve 25% of the total seat for the free education for the Weaker Section Students. All private unaided schools were fixing their own fee structure, till the year 2009. But, after the Court order, the fee structure was regularized.

=== TCS Employee Order ===
A Pregnant Woman employee of TCS IT Company was terminated from service. When she filed a case before the High Court, Subbiah had passed an interim order restraining the IT company from removing her from the employment. Afterwards the IT Company had withdrawn the termination order of the employee.
