= Cheranmadevi Assembly constituency =

Former legislative assembly constituency in Tamil Nadu, India

Coordinates: 8.68°N 77.57°E

Cheranmadevi
- Former constituency for the Tamil Nadu Legislative Assembly

Constituency details
- Country: India
- Region: South India
- State: Tamil Nadu
- District: Tirunelveli
- Lok Sabha constituency: Thiruchendur
- Established: 1951
- Abolished: 2008
- Total electors: 1,58,911
- Reservation: None

Cheranmadevi was an assembly constituency located in Tiruchendur Lok Sabha constituency in Tamil Nadu. After the realignment of Lok Sabha and Vidhan Sabha segments in 2008, both this assembly segment and its parent parliament seat ceased to exist.

== Members of the Legislative Assembly ==
| Year | Name | Party |
|---|---|---|
| 1952 | S. Chellapan | Indian National Congress |
| 1967 | D. S. Adhimoolam | Swatantra Party |
| 1971 | D. S. A. Sivaprakasam | Swatantra Party |
| 1977 | P. H. Pandian | All India Anna Dravida Munnetra Kazhagam |
| 1980 | P. H. Pandian | All India Anna Dravida Munnetra Kazhagam |
| 1984 | P. H. Pandian | All India Anna Dravida Munnetra Kazhagam |
| 1989 | P. H. Pandian | All India Anna Dravida Munnetra Kazhagam (JA) |
| 1991 | R. Puthunainar Adithan | All India Anna Dravida Munnetra Kazhagam |
| 1996 | P. Veldurai | Tamil Maanila Congress |
| 2001 | P. H. Manoj Pandian | All India Anna Dravida Munnetra Kazhagam |
| 2006 | P. Veldurai | Indian National Congress |

== Election results ==
Vote share of winning candidates
| 2006 | 43.72% |
| 2001 | 53.51% |
| 1996 | 39.41% |
| 1991 | 65.44% |
| 1989 | 27.06% |
| 1984 | 67.45% |
| 1980 | 57.62% |
| 1977 | 35.34% |
| 1971 | 50.14% |
| 1967 | 53.78% |
| 1952 | 45.94% |

=== 2006 ===
2006 Tamil Nadu Legislative Assembly election: Cheranmadevi
| Party | Candidate | Votes | % | ±% |
|---|---|---|---|---|
| INC | P. Veldurai | 48,527 | 43.72 | New |
| AIADMK | P. H. Manoj Pandian | 42,495 | 38.29 | −15.23 |
| DMDK | S. Rajendra Nathan | 8,122 | 7.32 | New |
| AIFB | A. Paramasivan | 5,966 | 5.37 | New |
| BSP | S. Udayakumar | 1,920 | 1.73 | New |
| BJP | P. Arumuganainar | 1,626 | 1.46 | −40.27 |
| RLD | R. Achuthan | 1,055 | 0.95 | New |
| Independent | A. Paulrathinam | 805 | 0.73 | New |
| Margin of victory | | 6,032 | 5.43 | −6.34 |
| Turnout | | 110,996 | 69.85 | 9.52 |
| Registered electors | | 158,911 | | |
| INC gain from AIADMK | | Swing | -9.79 | |

=== 2001 ===
2001 Tamil Nadu Legislative Assembly election: Cheranmadevi
| Party | Candidate | Votes | % | ±% |
|---|---|---|---|---|
| AIADMK | P. H. Manoj Pandian | 49,873 | 53.51 | +35.32 |
| BJP | N. Chockalingam | 38,898 | 41.74 | +39.73 |
| Independent | R. Achuthan | 1,885 | 2.02 | New |
| Independent | R. Charles | 1,147 | 1.23 | New |
| Independent | B. Krishnan | 615 | 0.66 | New |
| Independent | S. Ganesaraj | 483 | 0.52 | New |
| Margin of victory | | 10,975 | 11.78 | −0.46 |
| Turnout | | 93,200 | 60.32 | −11.37 |
| Registered electors | | 154,502 | | |
| AIADMK gain from TMC(M) | | Swing | 14.10 | |

=== 1996 ===
1996 Tamil Nadu Legislative Assembly election: Cheranmadevi
| Party | Candidate | Votes | % | ±% |
|---|---|---|---|---|
| TMC(M) | P. Veldurai | 39,004 | 39.41 | New |
| Independent | P. H. Pandian | 26,897 | 27.18 | New |
| AIADMK | M. R. Janarthanan | 18,002 | 18.19 | −47.25 |
| CPI(M) | S. K. Palanichamy | 6,296 | 6.36 | New |
| Independent | S. Mariyasundaram | 2,405 | 2.43 | New |
| Independent | M. Susindran | 2,179 | 2.20 | New |
| BJP | S. Muthappa | 1,985 | 2.01 | New |
| Independent | M. Raj | 629 | 0.64 | New |
| Margin of victory | | 12,107 | 12.23 | −25.77 |
| Turnout | | 98,977 | 71.69 | 4.63 |
| Registered electors | | 145,196 | | |
| TMC(M) gain from AIADMK | | Swing | -26.03 | |

=== 1991 ===
1991 Tamil Nadu Legislative Assembly election: Cheranmadevi
| Party | Candidate | Votes | % | ±% |
|---|---|---|---|---|
| AIADMK | R. Puthunainar Adithan | 59,358 | 65.44 | +38.38 |
| Independent | P. H. Pandian | 24,890 | 27.44 | New |
| Independent | N. S. Nadarajan | 4,912 | 5.42 | New |
| Margin of victory | | 34,468 | 38.00 | 37.27 |
| Turnout | | 90,705 | 67.06 | −11.54 |
| Registered electors | | 139,906 | | |
| AIADMK hold | | Swing | 38.38 | |

=== 1989 ===
1989 Tamil Nadu Legislative Assembly election: Cheranmadevi
| Party | Candidate | Votes | % | ±% |
|---|---|---|---|---|
| AIADMK | P. H. Pandian | 26,113 | 27.06 | −40.39 |
| DMK | R. Avudaiappan | 25,413 | 26.34 | −5.31 |
| INC | P. Veldurai | 23,270 | 24.12 | New |
| AIADMK | T. P. S. H. Amarnath Prapahar Ram Sait | 20,409 | 21.15 | −46.3 |
| Margin of victory | | 700 | 0.73 | −35.08 |
| Turnout | | 96,494 | 78.60 | 0.92 |
| Registered electors | | 124,735 | | |
| AIADMK hold | | Swing | -40.39 | |

=== 1984 ===
1984 Tamil Nadu Legislative Assembly election: Cheranmadevi
| Party | Candidate | Votes | % | ±% |
|---|---|---|---|---|
| AIADMK | P. H. Pandian | 55,898 | 67.45 | +9.83 |
| DMK | P. S. Pandian | 26,225 | 31.64 | New |
| Margin of victory | | 29,673 | 35.80 | 19.50 |
| Turnout | | 82,874 | 77.68 | 6.43 |
| Registered electors | | 112,131 | | |
| AIADMK hold | | Swing | 9.83 | |

=== 1980 ===
1980 Tamil Nadu Legislative Assembly election: Cheranmadevi
| Party | Candidate | Votes | % | ±% |
|---|---|---|---|---|
| AIADMK | P. H. Pandian | 42,793 | 57.62 | +22.27 |
| INC | V. Ratnasabhapathy | 30,683 | 41.31 | +9.31 |
| Independent | M. James | 407 | 0.55 | New |
| Margin of victory | | 12,110 | 16.30 | 12.97 |
| Turnout | | 74,274 | 71.25 | 3.50 |
| Registered electors | | 105,348 | | |
| AIADMK hold | | Swing | 22.27 | |

=== 1977 ===
1977 Tamil Nadu Legislative Assembly election: Cheranmadevi
| Party | Candidate | Votes | % | ±% |
|---|---|---|---|---|
| AIADMK | P. H. Pandian | 24,256 | 35.34 | New |
| INC | V. Ratnasabapathi | 21,964 | 32.00 | New |
| DMK | K. S. Subramaniam | 11,469 | 16.71 | −33.15 |
| JP | K. Selvaraj | 10,946 | 15.95 | New |
| Margin of victory | | 2,292 | 3.34 | 3.06 |
| Turnout | | 68,635 | 67.75 | −9.45 |
| Registered electors | | 102,377 | | |
| AIADMK gain from SWA | | Swing | -14.80 | |

=== 1971 ===
1971 Tamil Nadu Legislative Assembly election: Cheranmadevi
| Party | Candidate | Votes | % | ±% |
|---|---|---|---|---|
| SWA | D. S. A. Sivaprakasam | 34,739 | 50.14 | New |
| DMK | S. Ratnavelpandian | 34,546 | 49.86 | New |
| Margin of victory | | 193 | 0.28 | −9.19 |
| Turnout | | 69,285 | 77.20 | −3.42 |
| Registered electors | | 91,676 | | |
| SWA hold | | Swing | -3.64 | |

=== 1967 ===
1967 Madras Legislative Assembly election: Cheranmadevi
| Party | Candidate | Votes | % | ±% |
|---|---|---|---|---|
| SWA | D. S. Adhimoolam | 36,206 | 53.78 | New |
| INC | S. Chellapandian | 29,831 | 44.31 | New |
| Independent | N. Hariharan | 840 | 1.25 | New |
| Independent | P. Annamalai | 445 | 0.66 | New |
| Margin of victory | | 6,375 | 9.47 | |
| Turnout | | 67,322 | 80.62 | |
| Registered electors | | 85,484 | | |
| SWA win (new seat) | | | | |

=== 1952 ===
1952 Madras Legislative Assembly election: Cheranmadevi
| Party | Candidate | Votes | % | ±% |
|---|---|---|---|---|
| INC | S. Chellapandi | 18,625 | 45.94 | New |
| Socialist Party (India) | S. Dasaratharam | 12,720 | 31.37 | New |
| Independent | S. R. Subramaniam | 6,874 | 16.95 | New |
| Independent | M. Madaswamy | 2,326 | 5.74 | New |
| Margin of victory | | 5,905 | 14.56 | |
| Turnout | | 40,545 | 56.89 | |
| Registered electors | | 71,265 | | |
| INC win (new seat) | | | | |
