= M. Sakthivel Murugan =

Indian politician (died 2020)

Member of the Tamil Nadu Legislative Assembly
- In office 2001–2006
- Constituency: Ambasamudram

Personal details
- Party: All India Anna Dravida Munnetra Kazhagam

M. Sakthivel Murugan (died 3 January 2020) was an Indian politician and former Member of the Legislative Assembly. He was elected to the Tamil Nadu Legislative Assembly as an Anna Dravida Munnetra Kazhagam candidate from Ambasamudram constituency in the 2001 election. He died from a heart attack on 3 January 2020.

== Electoral performance ==
Election	Constituency	Political party	Result	Vote %	Opposition			Ref
Election	Constituency	Political party	Result	Vote %	Candidate	Political party	Vote %	Ref
2001	Ambasamudram	AIADMK	Won	48.04%	R. Avudaiyappan	DMK	43.55%	
