= Vasanth TV =

Coordinates: 13°1′38″N 80°13′30.6″E

- Country: India
- Broadcast area: India
- Headquarters: Chennai, Tamil Nadu, India

Programming
- Language: Tamil
- Picture format: 576i (SDTV)

History
- Launched: 5 May 2008
- Founder: H. Vasanthakumar

Links
- Website: Vasanth.tv

Vasanth TV is a Tamil entertainment satellite channel which is owned by Vinoth Vasanthakumar of Vasanth & Co Group.

The company has tied up with Tata Communications for providing the uplinking facilities.

== List of shows ==
- Aalaya Darisanam
- Kitchen Killadigal
- Vetri Padi Kattu
- Fun O Fun
- Thenaruvi
- Mann Pesum Sarithram
- Gala Gala Galatta
- Marmam

== List of films ==
- Pizhai (2020)
- Day Knight (2020)
- Dha Dha 87 (2019)
- Kaathadi (2018)
- Koottali (2018)
- Andhra Mess (2018)
- Genius (2018)
- Pandigai (2017)
- Attu (2017)
- Bongu (2017)
- Chennaiyil Oru Naal 2 (2017)
- Mupparimanam (2017)
- Aarambame Attagaasam (2017)
- Maaveeran Kittu (2017)
- Kadhal Kasakuthaiya (2017)
- Nenjil Thunivirundhal (2017)
- Adhagappattathu Magajanangalay (2017)
- Mudhal Kadhal Mazhai (2010)
- Sanikizhamai Saayangalam 5 Mani (2010)
- Ochayee (2010)
- Lathika (2011)

== See also ==
- Vasanth & Co
