= P. H. Manoj Pandian =

Indian politician

P. H. Manoj Pandian, M.L.

Member of Tamil Nadu Legislative Assembly
- Incumbent
- Assumed office 12 May 2021
- Preceded by: Dr. Poongothai Aladi Aruna
- Constituency: Alangulam
- In office 13 May 2001 – 11 May 2006
- Preceded by: P. Veldurai
- Succeeded by: P. Veldurai
- Constituency: Cheranmahadevi

Member of Parliament, Rajya Sabha
- In office 30 June 2010 – 29 June 2016
- Succeeded by: A. Vijayakumar
- Constituency: Tamil Nadu

Personal details
- Born: 8 August 1971 (age 55)
- Party: Dravida Munnetra Kazhagam
- Other political affiliations: AIADMK (until 2022); Independent (2022–2025)
- Spouse: Deepti Manoj Pandian
- Children: 2
- Parent(s): Dr. P. H. Pandian, (father); Dr. Cynthia Pandian, (mother)
- Education: B.L., M.L., educated at Dr. Ambedkar Law College, Chennai and Madras University, Chennai
- Occupation: Advocate

Paul Hector Manoj Pandian (born 8 August 1971), better known as P. H. Manoj Pandian, is a politician and former Member of the Legislative Assembly for Alangulam and Cheranmadevi constituencies for various times periods. His father, P. H. Pandian, was the speaker of Tamil Nadu assembly in 1980s.

He was elected to the Tamil Nadu legislative assembly as an Anna Dravida Munnetra Kazhagam candidate from Cheranmahadevi constituency in 2001 election and from Alangulam in 2021. He was a Member of Parliament (Rajya Sabha) from 2010 to 2016

On 4 November 2025, Pandian joined the DMK and resigned as MLA from his Alangulam seat later that day.

== Schooling ==
- Balar Kalvi Nilayam (Anitha School from Nursery to 2nd Std)
- CSI Bain School, Kilpauk from 3rd Std to 5th Std.
- Don Bosco Matriculation Higher Secondary School, Egmore, Chennai (From 6th Std to 12th Std)

== Educational qualifications ==
Bachelor Of Law (B.L.), Madras Law College. M.L. (International and Constitutional Law) (Madras University).

== Posts held ==
- MP (Member of Parliament) Rajya Sabha from 2010 to 2016
- Member of the Petition Committee of the Parliament.
- Member of the Parliamentary Committee on Science and Technology and Environment and Forests.
- Member of Consultative Committee, Ministry of Civil Aviation of the Parliament.
- M.L.A. (Member of Legislative Assembly) from 2001 to 2006 – Cheranmahadevi Constituency.
- Was the Chairman of the Tamil Nadu Legislative Assembly Estimates Committee.
- Was the Member of the Dr. Ambedkar University Senate
- Was a member of Ex-Servicemen Board

== Party positions held ==
- Member of AIADMK from 1993.
- Appointed Joint Secretary, AIADMK, Advocates Wings in 2000.
- Appointed Secretary, AIADMK, State Advocates Wings in 2007.
- Past he was the Organizing Secretary of the AIADMK.
- Joined DMK party on 04-11-2025 by the presence of M. K. Stalin

== Electoral performance ==
Election	Party	Constituency Name	Result	Votes gained	Vote share%
2026	DMK	Alangulam	Won	69,170	31.32%
2021	AIADMK	Alangulam	Won	74,153	36.44%
2006	AIADMK	Cheranmadevi	Lost	42,495	38.29%
2001	AIADMK	Cheranmadevi	Won	49,873	53.51%

== Important conferences attended ==
- Was sponsored by American Consulate on behalf of India to attend the International Youth Visitor Leadership Programme conducted in Washington, USA in the year 2009.
- Attended the" COP21 Summit on Climate Change" in Paris, France in 2015.

== Associations ==
- Member of Madras High Court Advocate Association
- Member of Madras Bar Association
