= V. Paulraj Natesan =

Indian politician

V. Paulraj Natesan was an Indian politician and former Member of the Legislative Assembly. He was elected to the Tamil Nadu legislative assembly as an Anna Dravida Munnetra Kazhagam candidate from Nanguneri constituency in 1991 election.
