= S. Shangumuthu Thevar =

Indian politician

S. Shangumuthu Thevar was an Indian politician and former Member of the Legislative Assembly.People called him Sattaiadi Shanmuga Thever. He was elected to the Tamil Nadu legislative assembly as an Indian National Congress (Organisation) candidate from Ambasamudram constituency in 1971 election.

== Electoral performance ==
Election	Constituency	Political party	Result	Vote %	Opposition			Ref
Election	Constituency	Political party	Result	Vote %	Candidate	Political party	Vote %	Ref
1971	Ambasamudram	INC	Won	46.52%	R. V. Ananthakrishnan	DMK	41.32%	
1980	Ambasamudram	INC	Lost	40.89%	Easwarmoorthy alias Soranam	CPI(M)	47.39%	
