= K. Ravi Arunan =

Indian politician

Member of the Tamil Nadu Legislative Assembly
- In office 1996–2001
- Constituency: Tenkasi
- In office 1989–1991
- Constituency: Ambasamudram

Personal details
- Party: Tamil Maanila Congress

K. Ravi Arunan is an Indian politician and was a Member of the Legislative Assembly. He was elected to the Tamil Nadu legislative assembly as an Indian National Congress (INC) candidate from Ambasamudram constituency in the 1989 election and from Tenkasi constituency as a Tamil Maanila Congress (Moopanar) (TMC) candidate in the 1996 election.

Arunan left the TMC and became a member of the Bharatiya Janata Party (BJP) in early 2001. He had lost the chance to defend the Tenkasi seat as a TMC candidate in the 2001 elections because of an election pact between the TMC and the All India Anna Dravida Munnetra Kazhagam (AIADMK). In the 2006 elections, he stood as a BJP candidate in Tenkasi and came a very distant third place, with 5190 votes.

Arunan was a member of the Oil Selection Board at the Indian Ministry of Petroleum and Natural Gas, created in 1993, which consisted of a chairman (Justice M. Maruthamuthu) and two members (K. Ravi Arunan and P. Subbarayan). The board had jurisdiction over Tamil Nadu, Puducherry, and the Andaman and Nicobar Islands.

== Electoral performance ==
Election	Constituency	Political party	Result	Vote %	Opposition			Ref
Election	Constituency	Political party	Result	Vote %	Candidate	Political party	Vote %	Ref
1989	Ambasamudram	INC	Won	34.17%	R. Murugaiah Pandian	AIADMK	29.69%	
1996	Tenkasi	TMC(M)	Won	52.82%	Aladi Sankaraiya	INC	26.08%	
