= M. John Vincent =

Indian politician

M. John Vincent was an Indian politician and three times Member of the Legislative Assembly. He was elected to the Tamil Nadu legislative assembly from Nanguneri constituency in the 1977 election as a Janata Party candidate, and as an Anna Dravida Munnetra Kazhagam candidate at the 1980 and 1984 elections.
