= V. P. Balasubramanian =

Indian politician (born 1946)

Deputy Speaker of Tamil Nadu Legislative Assembly
- In office 27 February 1985 – 30 January 1988
- Speaker: P. H. Pandian
- Preceded by: P. H. Pandian
- Succeeded by: V. P. Duraisamy
- Constituency: Vedasandur

Member of Tamil Nadu Legislative Assembly
- In office 1980–1988
- Preceded by: Vasan
- Succeeded by: P. Muthusamy
- Constituency: Vedasandur

Personal details
- Born: 1946 (age 79–80)
- Died: 17 July 2003
- Party: All India Anna Dravida Munnetra Kazhagam
- Children: V. P. B. Paramasivam; V. P. B. Maharajan (sons)

V. P. Balasubramanian (1946 – 17 July 2003) was an Indian politician of the Anna Dravida Munnetra Kazhagam. He served as a Member of the Legislative Assembly of Tamil Nadu from 1980 to 1988 representing the Vedasandur Assembly constituency, and Deputy speaker of Tamil Nadu Legislative Assembly from 1985 to 1988.
