= R. Puthunainar Adithan =

Indian politician

R. Puthunainar Adithan அர்.புதுநயினார் ஆதித்தன்

M.L.A (1991)
- In office 1991–1995
- Constituency: Cheranmadevi

Personal details
- Party: ADMK

R. Puthunainar Adithan was an Indian politician and former MLA elected to Tamil Nadu legislative assembly in 1991 as an ADMK candidate from Cheranmadevi constituency. His own elder brother is Mr. R. Dhanushkodi Adithan a notable Congress leader from south Tamil Nadu and 5 times Lok Sabha Member.
