= S. Manickaraj =

Indian politician

S. Manickaraj was an Indian politician and former Member of the Legislative Assembly. He was elected to the Tamil Nadu legislative assembly as an All India Anna Dravida Munnetra Kazhagam candidate from Nanguneri constituency in 2001 election.
