= M. Dhandapani =

Indian politician

M. Dhandapani was elected to the Tamil Nadu Legislative Assembly from the Vedasandur constituency in the 2006 election. He was a candidate of the Indian National Congress (INC) party.
