= Subramanyapuram =

Subramanyapuram Under Saasthavi Nallur Panchayat
- village
- Country: India
- State: Tamil Nadu
- District: Thoothukudi

Languages
  - Official: Tamil
- Time zone: UTC+5:30 (IST)
- PIN: 628702
- Telephone code: 04639 - 261
- Vehicle registration: TN-69X
- Coastline: 0 kilometres (0 mi)
- Nearest city: Thoothukudi
- Lok Sabha constituency: Tiruchendur (old), Thoothukudi (New)
- Website: www.subramanyapuram.blogspot.com

Subramanyapuram is a small village located near Sathan Kulam, Thoothukudi district, Tamil Nadu. It is about 4 km to the east of Sathan Kulam towards Thattar Madam.
