= Easwarmoorthy (Soranam) =

Indian politician

Member of the Tamil Nadu Legislative Assembly
- In office 1977–1984
- Constituency: Ambasamudram

Personal details
- Party: Communist Party of India (Marxist)

Easwaramoorthy (Soranam) was an Indian politician and former Member of the Legislative Assembly. He was elected to the Tamil Nadu legislative assembly as a Communist Party of India (Marxist) candidate from Ambasamudram constituency in 1977 and 1980 elections.

== Electoral performance ==
Election	Constituency	Political party	Result	Vote %	Opposition			Ref
Election	Constituency	Political party	Result	Vote %	Candidate	Political party	Vote %	Ref
1977	Ambasamudram	CPI(M)	Won	35.33%	R. Nallakannu	CPI	32.63%	
1980	Ambasamudram	CPI(M)	Won	47.39%	S. Shanmugamuthu Thevar	INC	40.89%	
