= S. Palanichamy =

Indian politician

S. Palanichamy is an Indian politician and former member of the Tamil Nadu Legislative Assembly from the Vedasandur constituency. He represented the All India Anna Dravida Munnetra Kazhagam party.
