= Balasubramanian (Ambasamudram MLA) =

Indian politician

Member of the Tamil Nadu Legislative Assembly
- In office 1984–1989
- Constituency: Ambasamudram

Personal details
- Party: All India Anna Dravida Munnetra Kazhagam

S. Balasubramanian is an Indian politician and former Member of the Legislative Assembly. He was elected to the Tamil Nadu Legislative Assembly as an Anna Dravida Munnetra Kazhagam candidate from Ambasamudram constituency in 1984 election.

== Electoral performance ==
Election	Constituency	Political party	Result	Vote %	Opposition			Ref
Election	Constituency	Political party	Result	Vote %	Candidate	Political party	Vote %	Ref
1984	Ambasamudram	AIADMK	Won	54.75%	A. Nallasivan	CPI(M)	44.14%	
