= M. G. Sankar =

Indian philanthropist, entrepreneur and politician

M. G. Sankar Reddiyar

Member of the Tamil Nadu Legislative Assembly
- In office 1952–1962
- Constituency: Nanguneri

Personal details
- Born: India
- Died: 25 December 1962 Tamil Nadu, India
- Party: Indian National Congress
- Parent(s): Kuruvaiya Reddiar (father), Subbammal (mother)
- Education: Studied in Ceylon (now Sri Lanka)
- Occupation: Philanthropist, Entrepreneur, Politician
- Known for: Infrastructure development, education, agriculture initiatives in Nanguneri

M. G. Sankar Reddiyar was an Indian philanthropist, entrepreneur and politician. He served as a Member of the Legislative Assembly thrice during his lifetime. He was elected to Tamil Nadu Legislative Assembly from Nanguneri constituency in 1952, 1957 and 1962 elections as an Indian National Congress candidate. Born to Shri. Kuruvaiya Reddiar and Smt. Subbammal, he went to Ceylon (now Sri Lanka) to pursue his studies. The entrepreneurial spirit within him inspired Shri. M G Sankarto venture into a soft beverages business. His beverages branded as "Vimto House" were popular with the British Army who were serving in the island during that time. His business grew and gathered roots in the island. On his return to India, he settled down near Nanguneri and continued his acts of entrepreneurship and philanthropy.

He played a key role in the construction of Manimuttar dam which was proposed by the British Government and was left untouched. Now Manimuttar dam feeds more than 30 thousand acres in Naguneri and Rathapuram taluks, without which the whole area would have been dry and unimproved.

Shri.Sankar was the key influence behind the ChittaruPattinangal Water Scheme that was developed in Rathapuram taluk by the then Government. His untiring efforts made this scheme happen which came as a boon to the erstwhile rain fed areas in the taluk, helping irrigation and human consumption.

He invested his time and resources in building schools for the economically deprived. He constructed a building for the school at Naguneri and donated it to the government. Today the school has grown to become a Higher Secondary School bearing his name. He also donated 26 acres of land to the government in construction of buildings in the name of Guru Sankar Government High School, and contributed 25 acres of land and constructed buildings for basic teachers training school, which is now functioning as District Institute of Education and Training.

On the social front, Shri. M G Sankar was instrumental in constructing link roads between villages. The drinking water wells were provided under rural development scheme under his leadership are still yielding.

He also created vast acres of farms to encourage agriculture in the region that helped the otherwise arid region become self-reliant. Thousands of families benefitted from the employment opportunities the farms provided. Shri.Sankar virtually brought about an economical revolution in the little town of Nanguneri in Tirunelveli district and the surrounding villages through his undaunted efforts and spirit of social consciousness.

He was elected to the Indian National Congress as the member of legislative assembly of the then Nanguneri Constituency thrice and worked tirelessly for the upliftment of the people and his constituency. Sankar Reddiar died on 25 December 1962 while serving his third term.
