= Malar Balasubramanian =

American doctor

Malar Balasubramanian (November 15, 1976 - February 15, 2017) was an American pediatrician who pleaded guilty on January 30, 2006 to a charge of involuntary manslaughter of her mother and was sentenced to 10 years in prison.

== Education and career ==
Malar Balasubramanian graduated from the Case Western Reserve University School of Medicine in Cleveland in 2001 and completed a pediatric residency program at Children's Hospital in Pittsburgh in June, 2004. She practiced medicine in India for a time before returning to her home in the Blue Ash suburb of Cincinnati, Ohio two or three weeks prior to her mother's homicide. She was planning to move to St. Louis to begin a fellowship in pediatric cardiology.

== Initial Story of Homicide ==
On July 27, 2005, Malar Balasubramaniam's brother and sister received an email from her. Parts of this email read, "Once I realized that I won't succeed the way I wanted to in life and decided to end it, I realized that I couldn't leave you two alone with Amma" ("Amma" means "mother") and "I'm sorry for what I did to Amma, I am, but I'm glad she's not here to hurt us anymore."

She told police she wanted to kill herself, but did not want to leave her mother behind to harm her brother and sister. She also told police she left a six-page letter in the car that explained why she killed her mother.

She was indicted Friday, July 29, 2005 on one count of aggravated murder.

== First Court Appearance ==
Malar Balasubramanian was arraigned on charges of aggravated murder before Hamilton County, Ohio Judge Dennis Helmick on August 8, 2005. She did not enter a plea, so Judge Helmick entered a "Not Guilty" plea for her. She was jailed without bond.

== Plea Change ==
On Friday, September 16, 2005, Malar Balasubramanian changed her plea to "not guilty by reason of insanity". Lawyers representing Dr. Balasubramanian said the new plea was supported by evidence that suggested the then 28-year-old doctor was distraught, injured and under the influence of drugs. The evidence included an e-mail police believed Dr. Balasubramanian transmitted to her brother and sister near the time of their mother's death. In the message, she tells her siblings she did not want to leave them alone with their mother and that she was "very sorry to have done this to you." She also wrote that she had considered hurting herself many times and had finally decided she could not go on because she was a "second-rate" friend, sibling and doctor.

== Final Plea Change and Sentencing ==
On Monday, January 30, 2006, Dr. Malar Balasubramanian changed her plea to guilty of a reduced charge of "involuntary manslaughter." She was sentenced to 10 years in jail by Judge Dennis Helmick. She was released on December 18, 2012 on judicial release. The judicial release kept her under the probation until the December 2017 however due to her good conduct she was given an early release from the probation.

== Death ==
On Wednesday, February 15, 2017, she was found in her apartment in Upper Manhattan where she had hanged herself.

== References / External Links ==
- Doctor will be charged after mother found dead Cincinnati Enquirer, July 28, 2005
- Indian doctor to be charged with mother's death Hindustan Times / Associated Press, July 28, 2005
- "Daughter Held Without Bond In Mother's Murder". WKRC-TV. August 8, 2005. Archived from the original on 2005-11-25.
- Daughter Held Without Bond In Mother's Murder (Video) WKRC-TV, August 8, 2005
- Pediatrician taken to jail after stay in hospital Cincinnati Enquirer, August 9, 2005
- "Defendant's Motion to Suppress and Memorandum in Support" - filed in Case No. B0507468, State of Ohio v. Malar Balasubramanian, September 16, 2005
- "Cincinnati.com", February 17, 2017
