= R. Murugaiah Pandian =

Indian politician

Member of the Tamil Nadu Legislative Assembly
- In office 2016–2021
- Constituency: Ambasamudram
- In office 1991–1996

Personal details
- Party: All India Anna Dravida Munnetra Kazhagam

R. Murugaiah Pandian is an Indian politician and Member of the Legislative Assembly. He was elected to the Tamil Nadu legislative assembly as an Anna Dravida Munnetra Kazhagam candidate from Ambasamudram constituency in 1991 and 2016 elections. He served as chairman of Tamil Nadu Housing Board from 2011 to 2016.

== Electoral performance ==
Election	Constituency	Political party	Result	Vote %	Opposition			Ref
Election	Constituency	Political party	Result	Vote %	Candidate	Political party	Vote %	Ref
1989	Ambasamudram	AIADMK	Lost	29.69%	K. Ravi Arunan	INC	34.17%	
1991	Ambasamudram	AIADMK	Won	65.33%	S. Chellappa	CPI(M)	32.10%	
1996	Ambasamudram	AIADMK	Lost	28.02%	R. Avudaiyappan	DMK	48.89%	
2006	Ambasamudram	AIADMK	Lost	31.11%	R. Avudaiyappan	DMK	45.66%	
2016	Ambasamudram	AIADMK	Won	45.80%	R. Avudaiyappan	DMK	38.12%	
