= Ernavoor A. Narayanan =

Indian politician

Ernavoor A.Narayanan

Member of Tamil Nadu legislative assembly for Nanguneri
- In office 15 May 2011 – 12 May 2016

Founder and president of Samathuva Makkal Kazhagam
- Incumbent
- Assumed office 11 March 2016

A Narayanan
- Born: 5 May 1957 , Sathankulam, Madras State ( now Tamilnadu) , India
- Other name: Ernavoor A Narayanan
- Occupations: Politician and Businessman
- Organization: Sri Mangalam Finance Hotel Chennai Deluxe Apple Residency Hotel Chennai Le palace
- Spouse: Latha Narayanan
- Children: Pappathi Varunkumar Karthik Narayanan Shakila Prabhu Usha Kumaran

A. Narayanan is an Indian politician and an incumbent member of the Tamil Nadu Legislative Assembly from the Nanguneri constituency. He is the founder and president of Samathuva Makkal Kazhagam, a political party in Tamil Nadu, India. He formerly represented the All India Anna Dravida Munnetra Kazhagam party in 2011 and won from Nanguneri. He is also the Managing Director of Sri Mangalam Finance, Hotel Chennai Deluxe, Apple Residency and Chennai Le Palace.
