= Ambasamudram Assembly constituency =

One of the 234 State Legislative Assembly Constituencies in Tamil Nadu, in India

Coordinates: 8.7°N 77.47°E

Ambasamudram
- Constituency No. 225 for the Tamil Nadu Legislative Assembly

Constituency details
- Country: India
- Region: South India
- State: Tamil Nadu
- Lok Sabha constituency: Tirunelveli
- Established: 1951
- Total electors: 2,28,246

Member of Legislative Assembly
- 17th Tamil Nadu Legislative Assembly
- Incumbent Vacant

Ambasamudram is a constituency in the Tamil Nadu legislative assembly, that includes the city of Ambasamudram within Tirunelveli district. It was part of Tenkasi Lok Sabha constituency originally but moved to Tirunelveli Lok Sabha constituency now. In the 2011 election, the constituency had a total electorate of 193,552 comprising 96,157 males and 97,395 females. It is one of the 234 State Legislative Assembly Constituencies in Tamil Nadu, in India.

Ambasamudram Assembly constituency

== Members of Legislative Assembly ==
Year	Member	Political party
Madras State
1952	P. Chockalingam	Independent politician
1957	G. G. Dikshidar	Indian National Congress
1962	G. G. Dikshidar	Indian National Congress
1967	G. G. Dikshidar	Indian National Congress
Tamil Nadu
1971	S. Shangumuthu Thevar	Indian National Congress
1977	Easwarmoorthy	Communist Party of India (Marxist)
1980	Easwarmoorthy	Communist Party of India (Marxist)
1984	Balasubramanian	All India Anna Dravida Munnetra Kazhagam
1989	K. Ravi Arunan	Indian National Congress
1991	R. Murugaiah Pandian	All India Anna Dravida Munnetra Kazhagam
1996	R. Avudaiyappan	Dravida Munnetra Kazhagam
2001	M. Sakthivel Murugan	All India Anna Dravida Munnetra Kazhagam
2006	R. Avudaiyappan	Dravida Munnetra Kazhagam
2011	Dr. Esakki Subaya	All India Anna Dravida Munnetra Kazhagam
2016	R. Murugaiah Pandian	All India Anna Dravida Munnetra Kazhagam
2021	Dr. Esakki Subaya	All India Anna Dravida Munnetra Kazhagam
2026	Dr. Esakki Subaya	All India Anna Dravida Munnetra Kazhagam
2026^		

Madras State

== Election results ==
Vote share of winning candidates
2026	34.41%
2021	47.96%
2016	45.80%
2011	55.11%
2006	45.66%
2001	48.04%
1996	48.89%
1991	65.33%
1989	34.17%
1984	54.75%
1980	47.39%
1977	35.33%
1971	46.52%
1967	46.35%
1962	38.16%
1957	50.52%
1952	43.14%

=== Assembly By-election 2026 ===
2026 Tamil Nadu Legislative Assembly Bye-election: Ambasamudram
Party	Candidate	Votes	%	±%
TVK				
DMK				
AIADMK				
NTK	Seeman			
Other parties	Other party candidates			
Independent	Independent candidates			
NOTA	None of the above			
Margin of victory				
Turnout				
Registered electors				
gain from		Swing		

=== Assembly election 2026 ===
2026 Tamil Nadu Legislative Assembly election : Ambasamudram
Party	Candidate	Votes	%	±%
AIADMK	Dr. Esakki Subaya	65,589	34.23%	▼14.18
INC	V. P. Durai	55,344	28.88%	New
TVK	S. Rajagopal	53,611	27.98%	New
NTK	Dr. V. Sivasankaran	14,906	7.78%	▼0.02
NOTA	None of the above	1,060	0.55%	▼0.40
Margin of victory		10,245	5.36%	▼4.25
Turnout		191,613	83.95%	▲11.15
Total valid votes		191,195		
Registered electors		228,246		▼6.84
AIADMK gain from AIADMK		Swing	▼14.11	

=== Assembly election 2021 ===
2021 Tamil Nadu Legislative Assembly election : Ambasamudram
Party	Candidate	Votes	%	±%
AIADMK	Dr. Esakki Subaya	85,211	48.41%	▲2.61
DMK	R. Avudaiyappan	68,296	38.80%	▲0.68
NTK	Shenbaga Valli	13,735	7.80%	▲6.76
AMMK	C. Rani Ranjitham	4,194	2.38%	New
MNM	C. Sengulam Ganesan	2,807	1.59%	New
NOTA	None of the above	1,673	0.95%	▼0.24
Margin of victory		16,915	9.61%	▲1.93
Turnout		178,361	72.80%	▼0.33
Total valid votes		176,008		
Rejected ballots		307	0.17%	▼0.05
Registered electors		245,003		▲4.23
AIADMK hold		Swing		

=== Assembly election 2016 ===
2016 Tamil Nadu Legislative Assembly election : Ambasamudram
Party	Candidate	Votes	%	±%
AIADMK	R. Murugaiah Pandian	78,555	45.80%	▼9.31
DMK	R. Avudaiyappan	65,389	38.12%	▼0.07
CPI(M)	P. Karpagavalli	13,690	7.98%	New
BJP	V. Sasikala	4,711	2.75%	▲0.90
NOTA	None of the above	2,041	1.19%	New
NTK	S. Thennarasu	1,778	1.04%	New
PMK	R. Anbalagan	1,310	0.76%	New
Margin of victory		13,166	7.68%	▼9.24
Turnout		171,903	73.13%	▼1.95
Total valid votes		171,528		
Rejected ballots		375	0.22%	▲0.22
Registered electors		235,065		▲21.33
AIADMK hold		Swing		

=== Assembly election 2011 ===
2011 Tamil Nadu Legislative Assembly election : Ambasamudram
Party	Candidate	Votes	%	±%
AIADMK	Dr. Esakki Subaya	80,156	55.11%	▲24.00
DMK	R. Avudaiyappan	55,547	38.19%	▼7.47
JMM	S. Nambirajan	2,971	2.04%	New
BJP	N. Balachandran	2,688	1.85%	▲0.53
Independent	S. Sureshkumar	1,466	1.01%	
Margin of victory		24,609	16.92%	▲2.36
Turnout		145,461	75.08%	▲8.67
Total valid votes		145,460		
Rejected ballots		1	0.00%	
Registered electors		193,734		▲19.04
AIADMK gain from DMK		Swing	▲9.45	

=== Assembly election 2006 ===
2006 Tamil Nadu Legislative Assembly election : Ambasamudram
Party	Candidate	Votes	%	±%
DMK	R. Avudaiyappan	49,345	45.66%	▲2.11
AIADMK	R. Murugaiah Pandian	33,614	31.11%	New
JD(U)	A. Narayanan	16,370	15.15%	New
DMDK	S. Ponraj	2,412	2.23%	New
AIFB	M. Venkatasalam	1,541	1.43%	New
BJP	S. V. Anburaj Subramanian	1,425	1.32%	New
BSP	E. Ganesan	959	0.89%	New
Independent	Velmurugan	650	0.60%	
Margin of victory		15,731	14.56%	▲10.07
Turnout		108,069	66.41%	▲8.57
Total valid votes		108,059		
Registered electors		162,742		▲5.01
DMK gain from AIADMK		Swing	▼2.38	

=== Assembly election 2001 ===
2001 Tamil Nadu Legislative Assembly election : Ambasamudram
Party	Candidate	Votes	%	±%
AIADMK	M. Sakthivel Murugan	43,021	48.04%	▲20.02
DMK	R. Avudaiyappan	39,001	43.55%	▼5.34
MDMK	Selvaraj Franklin	3,894	4.35%	▼9.40
Independent	K. Thangaraja	1,655	1.85%	
SP	G. Murugadasan	754	0.84%	New
Independent	K. P. Singanatham Shanmuga Thevar	635	0.71%	
Margin of victory		4,020	4.49%	▼16.38
Turnout		89,639	57.84%	▼10.65
Total valid votes		89,554		
Rejected ballots		85	0.09%	▼4.99
Registered electors		154,974		▲6.88
AIADMK gain from DMK		Swing	▼0.85	

=== Assembly election 1996 ===
1996 Tamil Nadu Legislative Assembly election : Ambasamudram
Party	Candidate	Votes	%	±%
DMK	R. Avudaiyappan	46,116	48.89%	New
AIADMK	R. Murugaiah Pandian	26,427	28.02%	New
MDMK	K. Meena Zacharias	12,969	13.75%	New
BJP	M. Mariyappan	1,863	1.98%	New
JP	M. Arumugaperumal	1,802	1.91%	▲1.41
Independent	R. Achutha Nadar	1,386	1.47%	
Independent	S. Pannai Krishna Kanthan (Lion)	1,284	1.36%	
AIIC(T)	C. Gunasekaran	1,199	1.27%	New
Margin of victory		19,689	20.87%	▼12.36
Turnout		99,308	68.49%	▼0.30
Total valid votes		94,324		
Rejected ballots		5,041	5.08%	▲1.86
Registered electors		144,992		▲9.81
DMK gain from AIADMK		Swing	▼16.44	

=== Assembly election 1991 ===
1991 Tamil Nadu Legislative Assembly election : Ambasamudram
Party	Candidate	Votes	%	±%
AIADMK	R. Murugaiah Pandian	57,433	65.33%	New
CPI(M)	S. Chellappa	28,219	32.10%	▲6.64
PMK	S. Poothathan	1,004	1.14%	New
Margin of victory		29,214	33.23%	▲28.76
Turnout		90,837	68.79%	▼5.35
Total valid votes		87,907		
Rejected ballots		2,923	3.22%	▲1.43
Registered electors		132,041		▲4.83
AIADMK gain from INC		Swing	▲31.16	

=== Assembly election 1989 ===
1989 Tamil Nadu Legislative Assembly election : Ambasamudram
Party	Candidate	Votes	%	±%
INC	K. Ravi Arunan	31,337	34.17%	▲33.06
AIADMK	R. Murugaiah Pandian	27,234	29.69%	New
CPI(M)	M. Pandian	23,354	25.46%	▼18.68
Independent	R. S. K. Durai	5,762	6.28%	
Independent	N. Paramasivan	1,237	1.35%	
Independent	R. Ganapathy	636	0.69%	
Margin of victory		4,103	4.47%	▼6.14
Turnout		93,391	74.14%	▼1.62
Total valid votes		91,721		
Rejected ballots		1,670	1.79%	▼3.17
Registered electors		125,960		▲11.07
INC gain from AIADMK		Swing	▼20.58	

=== Assembly election 1984 ===
1984 Tamil Nadu Legislative Assembly election : Ambasamudram
Party	Candidate	Votes	%	±%
AIADMK	Balasubramanian	44,707	54.75%	New
CPI(M)	A. Nallasivan	36,041	44.14%	▼3.25
INC	M. Eramasamy	910	1.11%	▼39.78
Margin of victory		8,666	10.61%	▲4.11
Turnout		85,922	75.76%	▲11.72
Total valid votes		81,658		
Rejected ballots		4,264	4.96%	▲3.54
Registered electors		113,411		▲8.54
AIADMK gain from CPI(M)		Swing	▲7.36	

=== Assembly election 1980 ===
1980 Tamil Nadu Legislative Assembly election : Ambasamudram
Party	Candidate	Votes	%	±%
CPI(M)	Easwarmoorthy alias Soranam	31,262	47.39%	▲12.06
INC	S. Shangumuthu Thevar	26,975	40.89%	New
Independent	K. V. Subramaniam	6,999	10.61%	
Independent	N. Sethuramasamy	730	1.11%	
Margin of victory		4,287	6.50%	▲3.80
Turnout		66,914	64.04%	▼2.96
Total valid votes		65,966		
Rejected ballots		948	1.42%	▲0.16
Registered electors		104,484		▲4.56
CPI(M) hold		Swing		

=== Assembly election 1977 ===
1977 Tamil Nadu Legislative Assembly election : Ambasamudram
Party	Candidate	Votes	%	±%
CPI(M)	Easwarmoorthy alias Soranam	23,356	35.33%	▲23.18
CPI	R. Nallakannu	21,569	32.63%	New
JP	S. S. Rajalinga Raja	12,208	18.47%	New
DMK	P. Arumugam	8,114	12.27%	▼29.05
Independent	K. M. Arunasalam	863	1.31%	
Margin of victory		1,787	2.70%	▼2.50
Turnout		66,953	67.00%	▼7.93
Total valid votes		66,110		
Rejected ballots		843	1.26%	▲1.26
Registered electors		99,927		▲5.43
CPI(M) gain from INC		Swing	▼11.19	

=== Assembly election 1971 ===
1971 Tamil Nadu Legislative Assembly election : Ambasamudram
Party	Candidate	Votes	%	±%
INC	S. Shangumuthu Thevar	31,192	46.52%	New
DMK	R. V. Ananthakrishnan	27,707	41.32%	New
CPI(M)	A. Nallasivan	8,148	12.15%	▼30.40
Margin of victory		3,485	5.20%	▲1.40
Turnout		71,016	74.93%	▼2.36
Total valid votes		67,047		
Registered electors		94,781		▲7.06
INC gain from INC		Swing	▲0.17	

=== Assembly election 1967 ===
1967 Madras State Legislative Assembly election : Ambasamudram
Party	Candidate	Votes	%	±%
INC	G. Gomathisankara Dikshidar	30,682	46.35%	▲8.19
CPI(M)	A. Nallasivan	28,169	42.55%	New
CPI	R. Nallakannu	7,345	11.10%	▼18.71
Margin of victory		2,513	3.80%	▼4.56
Turnout		68,426	77.29%	▲0.96
Total valid votes		66,196		
Registered electors		88,528		▼3.48
INC hold		Swing		

=== Assembly election 1962 ===
1962 Madras State Legislative Assembly election : Ambasamudram
Party	Candidate	Votes	%	±%
INC	G. Gomathisankara Dikshidar	25,883	38.16%	▼12.36
CPI	A. Nallasivan	20,216	29.81%	▼6.16
DMK	S. Rathinavelpandian	17,107	25.22%	New
SWA	R. K. Viswanathan	3,907	5.76%	New
Independent	M. P. Annamalai	707	1.04%	
Margin of victory		5,667	8.36%	▼6.19
Turnout		70,014	76.33%	▲23.27
Total valid votes		67,820		
Registered electors		91,722		▼3.78
INC hold		Swing		

=== Assembly election 1957 ===
1957 Madras State Legislative Assembly election : Ambasamudram
Party	Candidate	Votes	%	±%
INC	G. Gomathisankara Dikshidar	25,552	50.52%	▲16.03
CPI	A. Nallasivan	18,191	35.97%	New
Independent	S. Kandasamy	5,516	10.91%	
Independent	Annamali	1,316	2.60%	
Margin of victory		7,361	14.55%	▲5.90
Turnout		50,575	53.06%	▼12.26
Total valid votes		50,575		
Registered electors		95,325		▲24.71
INC gain from Independent		Swing	▲7.38	

=== Assembly election 1952 ===
1952 Madras State Legislative Assembly election : Ambasamudram
Party	Candidate	Votes	%	±%
Independent	P. Chockalingam	21,538	43.14%	New
INC	Lakshmi Sankara Iyer	17,220	34.49%	New
Socialist Party (India)	Handare Subramaniam	6,144	12.31%	New
Independent	Paul T. Diraviam	4,540	9.09%	New
Independent	Ramalingam	485	0.97%	New
Margin of victory		4,318	8.65%	
Turnout		49,927	65.32%	
Total valid votes		49,927		
Registered electors		76,436		
Independent win (new seat)				
