= Ruby R. Manoharan =

Indian politician

Member of the Tamil Nadu Legislative Assembly
- In office 12 May 2021 – 4 May 2026
- Preceded by: N. Ganesaraja
- Succeeded by: V. Reddiarpatti Narayanan
- Constituency: Nanguneri

Personal details
- Party: Indian National Congress

Ruby R. Manoharan is an Indian politician who is a Member of Legislative Assembly of Tamil Nadu. He was born in Kanyakumari District on 25 May 1959. He was elected from Nanguneri as an Indian National Congress candidate in 2021.

== Electoral performance ==
Election	Constituency	Party	Result	Vote %	Runner-up	Runner-up Party	Runner-up vote %
2021 Tamil Nadu Legislative Assembly election	Nanguneri	INC	Won	45.51%	N. Ganesaraja	AIADMK	39.12%
