= G. Gomathisankara Dikshidar =

Indian politician

Member of the Tamil Nadu Legislative Assembly
- In office 1957 - 1962 1962 - 1967 1967 - 1972
- Constituency: Ambasamudram

Personal details
- Party: Indian National Congress

G. Gomathisankara Dikshidar was an Indian politician and former Member of the Legislative Assembly. He was elected to the Tamil Nadu legislative assembly as an Indian National Congress candidate from Ambasamudram constituency in 1957, 1962 and 1967 elections.

== Electoral performance ==
| Election | Constituency | Political party | Result | Vote % | Opposition | | | Ref |
| Election | Constituency | Political party | Result | Vote % | Candidate | Political party | Vote % | Ref |
|---|---|---|---|---|---|---|---|---|
| 1957 | Ambasamudram | INC | Won | 50.52% | A. Nallasivan | CPI | 35.97% | |
| 1962 | Ambasamudram | INC | Won | 38.16% | A. Nallasivan | CPI | 29.81% | |
| 1967 | Ambasamudram | INC | Won | 46.35% | A. Nallasivan | CPI(M) | 42.55% | |
