= S. V. Krishnan =

Indian politician

S. V. Krishnan was an Indian politician and former Member of the Legislative Assembly. He was elected to the Tamil Nadu legislative assembly as a Communist Party of India candidate from Nanguneri constituency in 1996 election.
