= R. Avudaiyappan =

Indian politician

11th Speaker of the Tamil Nadu Legislative Assembly
- In office 19 May 2006 – 15 May 2011
- Chief Minister: M. Karunanidhi
- Preceded by: K. Kalimuthu
- Succeeded by: D. Jayakumar

Member of the Tamil Nadu legislative assembly
- In office 11 May 2006 — 13 May 2011
- Preceded by: M. Sakthivel Murugan
- Succeeded by: Dr. Esakki Subbaiah
- Constituency: Ambasamudram
- In office 22 May 1996 – 21 May 2001
- Preceded by: R. Murugaiah Pandian
- Succeeded by: M. Sakthivel Murugan
- Constituency: Ambasamudram

R. Avudaiyappan is an Indian politician and former speaker of Tamil Nadu Assembly. He was elected to the Tamil Nadu legislative assembly as a Dravida Munnetra Kazhagam candidate from Ambasamudram constituency in 1996 and 2006 elections.

In 2011 Tamil Nadu State Assembly election also he contested from Ambasamudram Constituency. However, he lost to E.Subaya (AIADMK). In 2016 election he contested and lost to Murugaiah pandian of AIADMK. In 2021, he again lost to Esakki Subbiah He served as speaker of Tamil Nadu state assembly from 2006 to 2011.

== Electoral performance ==
Election	Constituency	Political party	Result	Vote %	Opposition			Ref
Election	Constituency	Political party	Result	Vote %	Candidate	Political party	Vote %	Ref
1996	Ambasamudram	DMK	Won	48.89%	R. Murugaiah Pandian	AIADMK	28.02%	
2001	Ambasamudram	DMK	Lost	43.55%	M. Sakthivel Murugan	AIADMK	48.04%	
2006	Ambasamudram	DMK	Won	45.66%	R. Murugaiah Pandian	AIADMK	31.11%	
2011	Ambasamudram	DMK	Lost	38.19%	Dr. Esakki Subaya	AIADMK	55.11%	
2016	Ambasamudram	DMK	Lost	38.12%	R. Murugaiah Pandian	AIADMK	45.80%	
2021	Ambasamudram	DMK	Lost	38.80%	Dr. Esakki Subaya	AIADMK	48.41%	-
