= AIADMK-led Alliance =

Indian political alliance

- அஇஅதிமுக தலைமையிலான கூட்டணி AIADMK-led Alliance
- Abbreviation: AIADMK+
- Chairperson: Edappadi K. Palaniswami
- Founder: M. G. Ramachandran
- Founded: 1977
- Ideology: Big tent Factions: Populism; Welfarism; Progressivism; Social equality Indian Nationalism; Hindutva; Tamil nationalism Social democracy
- Political position: Centre
- Colours: Green Saffron
- Alliance: National Democratic Alliance (National)
- Seats in Rajya Sabha: 6 / 18
- Seats in Lok Sabha: 0 / 40
- Seats in Tamil Nadu Legislative Assembly: 46 / 234
- Seats in Puducherry Legislative Assembly: 18 / 30
- Number of states and union territories in government: 1 / 31

The AIADMK-led Alliance (abbr. AIADMK+) is an Indian regional political party alliance in the state of Tamil Nadu and the union territory of Puducherry led by the All India Anna Dravida Munnetra Kazhagam (AIADMK).

== History ==
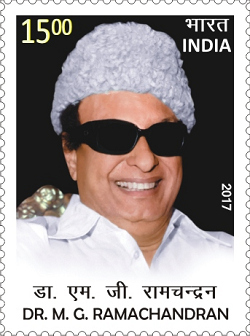
Dr. M.G. Ramachandran Founder of the alliance

AIADMK founder M. G. Ramachandran (M.G.R) formed the alliance, consisting of the Indian National Congress (INC) and the Communist Party of India (CPI), and faced the party's first ever general election post-emergency in 1977. Though that election resulted in a heavy defeat for the Prime Minister of India Indira Gandhi-led Indian National Congress at the national level, the AIADMK-INC Alliance swept Tamil Nadu by winning 34 out of 39 Lok Sabha seats in the state. The Janata Party won the election at the centre. After the election, the AIADMK ended up supporting the Janata Party under Morarji Desai. In 1979, AIADMK continued to support the Janata Party by supporting the Charan Singh government, which resulted in the appointment of two AIADMK cabinet members, making it the first time a non-congress Dravidian party member and the regional party member made it to the council of ministers at the national level.

AIADMK won the 1977 Tamil Nadu Legislative Assembly election with its allies, defeating its rival Dravida Munnetra Kazhagam (DMK), and M. G. Ramachandran (M.G.R) was sworn in as the third chief minister of Tamil Nadu.

In the 1980 Indian general election, the AIADMK and Janata Party alliance faced an upset defeat at the hands of the INC and DMK alliance, winning only 2 seats in Tamil Nadu. The INC and DMK alliance won 37 out of 39 seats in that election, which emboldened their alliance and made them think that people lost their faith in the M.G.R.-led government in the state. Under DMK's pressure, the AIADMK ministry and the Tamil Nadu legislative assembly were dismissed by the Indira Gandhi-led government on grounds of civil disorder due to farmers' protests for electricity subsidies. The Tamil Nadu legislative assembly election was held in 1980, in which the AIADMK and its allies, the AIFB, CPI, CPI(M), and GKNC won 162 seats, and again M.G.R. was sworn in as chief minister of Tamil Nadu for the second time. After this election, INC came close to the AIADMK.

In the wake of Chief Minister MGR's hospitalization in New York City and subsequent assassination of Indira Gandhi, newly assumed Prime Minister Rajiv Gandhi felt that his Government required a fresh mandate from the people, and dissolved the Lok Sabha a year before its actual end of term, for fresh general elections. At the same time, AIADMK recommended dissolution of the Tamil Nadu State Assembly a year ahead of the end of term, to use the sympathy wave of Congress due to Indira's death and M.G.R's illness. Congress(I) and AIADMK formed an alliance and contested both general elections to Lok Sabha and Tamil Nadu Assembly in 1984. The allocation of seats were done what was later dubbed, "The M.G.R formula". Where the regional party would contest 70% of the assembly seats and the national party would be given 70% of the Lok Sabha seats. The result was a landslide victory for INC and its ally AIADMK, winning 37 out of 39 Lok Sabha seats in the state and 195 seats in Tamil Nadu Assembly. M. G. Ramachandran (M.G.R) was sworn in as Chief Minister, for the third time. After the death of M. G. Ramachandran (M.G.R) in December 1987, the AIADMK split into two factions, one led by Janaki and the other by J. Jayalalithaa. Janaki briefly served as the chief minister and her government was dismissed by prime minister Rajiv Gandhi on 30 January 1988 citing the disruptions in the assembly. After a year of President's rule, Both the AIADMK factions contested with different alliances with separate symbols as the election commission froze the "two leaves" symbol of the AIADMK to them for 1989 assembly election. Congress contested the elections alone without allying with either factions and Rajiv Gandhi campaigned extensively making multiple campaign visits to Tamil Nadu. Due to its split, the AIADMK suffered heavily in the election, with the Janaki and Jayalalithaa factions winning only 2 and 27 seats, respectively. Following the AIADMK's rout in the election, the factions led by Jayalalithaa and Janaki merged under Jayalalithaa's leadership on 7 February 1989, as Janaki decided to quit politics as it was not her forte. On 8 February 1989, the Two Leaves symbol was granted to the united AIADMK led by Jayalalithaa. AIADMK and Congress again allied in mid 1989. This marks the start of the dominance of INC-AIADMK, for the next decade winning 38 seats in 1989 Lok Sabha election and all 39 seats in 1991 Lok Sabha election. In the wake of Rajiv Gandhi Assassination during the election campaign in Tamil Nadu, Democratic Progressive Alliance of AIADMK - Congress swept the state in both the Tamil Nadu assembly and Lok Sabha elections in 1991. AIADMK General Secretary J. Jayalalithaa sworn in as the chief minister for the first time. AIADMK - Congress Alliance routed in 1996 assembly election and Lok Sabha polls.

MGR Formula – seat sharing
Tamil Nadu Assembly election: 1. AIADMK (70.0%); 2. INC (30.0%)	Lok Sabha general election in Tamil Nadu: 1. AIADMK (30.0%); 2. INC (70.0%)

In the 1998 Indian general election, the AIADMK revived its electoral fortunes when it formed an alliance with the Bharatiya Janata Party (BJP), Marumalarchi Dravida Munnetra Kazhagam (MDMK) and Pattali Makkal Katchi (PMK), and the alliance won 30 seats out of 39 in Tamil Nadu. In the Atal Bihari Vajpayee-led government between 1998 and 1999, the AIADMK shared power with the BJP but withdrew its support of the 18 elected Lok Sabha MPs in early 1999, causing the BJP government to fall.

Following this, the AIADMK once again allied with the INC in the 1999 general election, and the alliance won 13 seats out of 39 in Tamil Nadu. In the 2001 assembly election, the AIADMK-led Secular Democratic Progressive Alliance, consisting of the Indian National Congress, the Tamil Maanila Congress (Moopanar) (TMC(M)), the Left Front, and the Pattali Makkal Katchi (PMK), regained power, winning 197 seats to the AIADMK's 132. Jayalalithaa sworn in as the chief minister for the second time. In 2004 Lok Sabha general election, AIADMK led National Democratic Alliance consisting of BJP, won none of the 39 Lok Sabha seats from the state. (Note: Joined in 15 Feb 2004, but leaved as de facto By late 2004, Jayalalithaa stopped attending NDA coordination meetings in Delhi.) In 2006 assembly election, in spite of media speculations of a hung assembly, the AIADMK led Democratic People Alliance, contesting with only the support of the MDMK, VCK and few other smaller parties, won 69 seats, with the AIADMK winning 61, compared to the DMK's 96. The AIADMK's electoral reversals continued in the 2009 general election. However, the party's performance was better than its debacle in 2004, and the AIADMK-led Third Front consisting of PMK, MDMK and left parties managed to win 12 seats, with the AIADMK winning 9 seats.

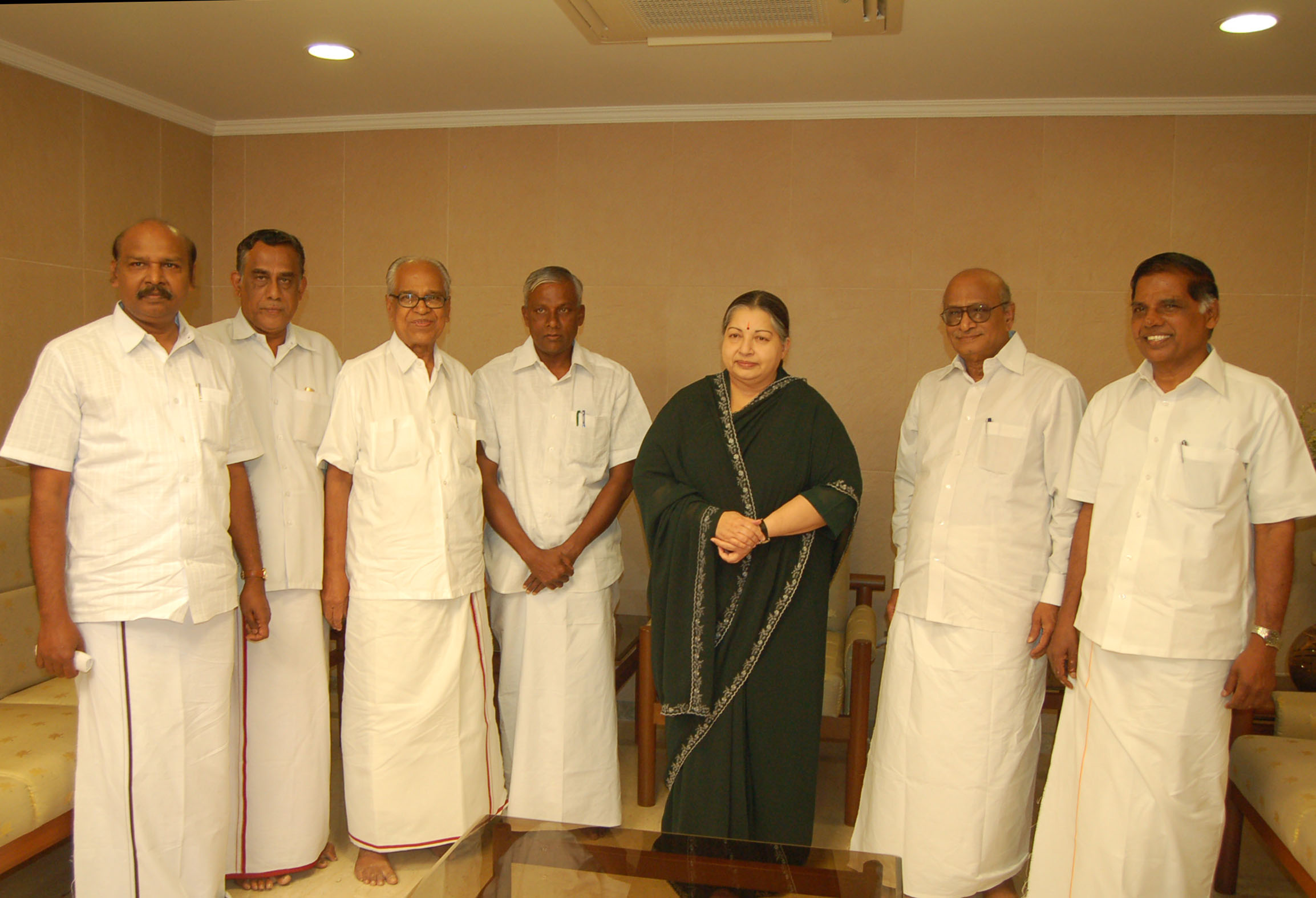
Jayalalithaa with the leaders of CPI(M) Party

In the 2011 assembly election, AIADMK led alliance with parties like the left and actor-turned-politician Vijayakant's Desiya Murpokku Dravida Kazhagam (DMDK), swept the polls, winning 203 seats, with the AIADMK winning 150. Jayalalithaa was sworn in as chief minister for the fourth time. In the union territory of Puducherry, the AIADMK allied with N. Rangasamy's All India N.R. Congress (AINRC) and won the 2011 assembly election, which was held in parallel with the Tamil Nadu assembly election. Rangasamy, on the other hand, formed the government without consulting the AIADMK and refused to share power with the pre-election alliance partner. So Jayalalithaa accused him of betraying the coalition.

The AIADMK's good electoral performance continued in the 2014 general election as well. It opted not to join any alliance and contested all seats in the state of Tamil Nadu and the union territory of Puducherry on its own. The party won an unprecedented 37 out of the 40 parliamentary constituencies it contested and emerged as the third largest party in the 16th Lok Sabha of the Indian Parliament. It was a massive victory that no other regional political party had ever achieved in the history of general elections. In the 2016 assembly election, running without allies, she swept the polls, winning 135 out of 234 seats. It was the most audacious decision made by her for the spectacular victory that no other political leader had ever made in the history of Tamil Nadu. On 23 May 2016, Jayalalithaa was sworn in as chief minister for the sixth time. After Jayalalithaa's death on 5 December 2016, AIADMK had gone through a sea changes, from accepting Sasikala as acting general secretary, Party Split, Merger of EPS and OPS factions, Sasikala's expulsion to Introduction of dual Leadership in the party.

In the 2019 Lok Sabha election, AIADMK led by then Tamil Nadu Chief Minister Edappadi K. Palaniswami and Deputy Chief Minister O. Panneerselvam as Coordinators, in alliance with the BJP again, won only one of the 39 Lok Sabha seats from the state and lost to the DMK led Secular Progressive Alliance. Later, in the 2021 assembly election, the AIADMK-led National Democratic Alliance, consisting of the PMK, BJP, and a few other smaller parties, won 75 seats compared to the 159 seats won by the DMK alliance and was pushed out of power by the DMK after a decade. The AIADMK emerged as the main party of the opposition in the assembly by winning 66 seats. During the period of 2022–23, The AIADMK again undergone many changes like abolition of dual leadership and the election of Edappadi K. Palaniswami as its General Secretary. Following the tensions with the BJP, The AIADMK left the National Democratic Alliance, by snapping ties with the BJP and It was officially announced on 25 September 2023. AIADMK to form and lead the new alliance headed by the General secretary Palaniswami to face the 2024 Indian general election and TN Assembly election in the state.

In the 2024 general election, the AIADMK-led Alliance consisting of Desiya Murpokku Dravida Kazhagam (DMDK), Puthiya Tamilagam (PT), and the Social Democratic Party of India (SDPI) contested in the state of Tamil Nadu and the union territories of Puducherry and Andaman and Nicobar Islands for the 18th Lok Sabha polls. In the alliance, the AIADMK contested 36 constituencies and the DMDK contested five constituencies. The alliance lost in all the constituencies it contested, and the Indian National Developmental Inclusive Alliance swept the election in Tamil Nadu and Puducherry. On 11 April 2025, AIADMK General Secretary Edappadi K. Palaniswami and BJP leader and Home Minister Amit Shah announced their alliance for 2026 TN Assembly election on a Joint Press Conference at Chennai. In January 2026, AIADMK formed ally with former partner PMK & long-time rival T. T. V. Dhinakaran-led AMMK.

== Electoral performance ==
=== Indian general elections ===
Lok Sabha Elections
Year	Lok Sabha	Alliance parties	Seats contested	Seats won	Change in seats	Percentage of votes	Vote swing	Popular vote	Outcome
1977	6th	AIADMK, CPI, INC, and IUML	40	35 / 542	▲35	5.56%	Steady	10,497,750	Alliance Broken
1980	7th	AIADMK, CPI, CPI(M), and JP	40	2 / 529	▼33	3.77%	▼1.79%	7,458,680	Opposition
1984	8th	AIADMK, GKNC, and INC	40	38 / 541	▲36	5.57	▲1.80%	13,101,318	Government
1989	9th	AIADMK, and INC	40	39 / 529	▲1	5.06%	▼0.51%	15,233,238	Opposition
1991	10th	AIADMK, and INC	40	40 / 534	▲1	5.52%	▲0.46%	15,189,033	Government
1996	11th	AIADMK, and INC	40	1 / 543	▼39	2.17%	▼3.35%	7,279,636	Opposition
1998	12th	AIADMK, BJP, JP, MDMK, PMK, and TRC	40	30 / 543	▲29	3.33%	▲1.16%	12,272,434	Government
1999	13th	AIADMK, CPI, CPI(M), INC, and INL	40	14 / 543	▼16	3.16%	▼0.17%	11,514,496	Opposition
2004	14th	AIADMK, and BJP	40	0 / 543	▼14	2.61%	▼0.55%	10,175,385	Lost
2009	15th	AIADMK, CPI, CPI(M), MDMK, and PMK	40	12 / 543	▲12	2.77%	▲0.16%	11,545,205	Others
2014	16th	AIADMK	40	37 / 543	▲25	3.31%	▲0.54%	18,111,579	Others
2019	17th	AIADMK, AINRC, BJP, DMDK, PMK, PNK, PT, and TMC(M)	40	1 / 543	▼36	2.23%	▼1.08%	13,555,095	Government
2024	18th	AIADMK, DMDK, PT, and SDPI	41	0 / 543	▼1	1.56%	▼0.67%	10,081,203	Lost

=== State legislative assembly elections ===
Tamil Nadu Legislative Assembly Elections
Duration	Election year	Allied parties	Seats won
AIADMK led Alliance
1977	1977	AIADMK, CPI(M), AIFB, IUML	144 / 234
1979–1980	1980	AIADMK, CPI, CPI(M), AIFB, GKNC	162 / 234
AIADMK - Congress Alliance
1984–1988	1984	AIADMK, INC, GKNC	195 / 234
AIADMK Factional Alliances
1988–1989	1989	AIADMK (Jayalalithaa), CPI	27 / 234
1988–1989	1989	AIADMK (Janaki), TMM	2 / 234
Democratic Progressive Alliance
1989–1996	1991	AIADMK, INC, IC(S)	225 / 234
1989–1996	1996	AIADMK, INC, IUML	4 / 234
Secular Democratic Progressive Alliance
1999–2001	2001	AIADMK, TMC, INC, PMK, CPI, CPI(M), AIFB, IUML, INL, TMMK	196 / 234
Democratic People Alliance
2006	2006	AIADMK, MDMK, VCK, INL, INTUC, MMK, JDS, TMML	69 / 234
AIADMK led Alliance
2008–2014	2011	AIADMK, DMDK, CPI, CPI(M), MMK, PT, AIFB, AISMK, RPI, AIMMK, TNKIP	203 / 234
AIADMK+
2014–2019	2016	AIADMK, AISMK, RPI, TNKIP, MP, MJK, TMML	136 / 234
National Democratic Alliance
2019–2023	2021	AIADMK, PMK, BJP, TMC, PTMK, TMMK, MMK, AIMMK, PBK, PDK	75 / 234
2025–present	2026	AIADMK, BJP, PMK, AMMK, TMC, IJK, PBK, PNK, TMMK, STMK, TMBSP, SIFB	53 / 234

All time - AIADMK+ Tamil Nadu assembly seat count (For majority=118 seats)

==== Tamil Nadu Assembly election result by alliance ====
Election	Seats won			Winning Coalition	Majority
Election	AIADMK+	DMK+	Others	Winning Coalition	Majority
1977	144	48	43	AIADMK+	96
1980	162	69	3	AIADMK+	93
1984	195	34	5	AIADMK+	161
1989	32	169	31	DMK+	137
1991	225	7	2	AIADMK+	218
1996	4	221	9	DMK+	217
2001	196	37	1	AIADMK+	159
2006	69	163	2	DMK+	94
2011	203	31	0	AIADMK+	172
2016	136	98	0	AIADMK+	38
2021	75	159	0	DMK+	84
2026	53	73	108	TVK	Hung

Puducherry Legislative Assembly Elections
Year	Assembly	Alliance parties	Seats contested	Seats won	Change in seats	Percentage of votes	Vote swing	Popular vote	Outcome
1974	4th	AIADMK, and CPI	28	14 / 30	▲14	36.28%	Steady	79,280	Government
1977	5th	AIADMK	27	14 / 30	Steady	30.96%	▼5.32%	69,873	Government
1980	6th	AIADMK, CPI, and CPI(M)	27	1 / 30	▼13	26.15%	▼4.81%	64,145	Others
1985	7th	AIADMK, and INC	30	21 / 30	▲20	48.43%	▲22.28%	146,122	Government
1990	8th	AIADMK, and INC	30	14 / 30	▼7	43.21%	▼5.22%	181,544	Opposition
1991	9th	AIADMK, INC, and ICS(SCS)	30	21 / 30	▲7	47.34%	▲4.13%	185,098	Government
1996	10th	AIADMK, and INC	30	12 / 30	▼9	37.87%	▼9.47%	174,296	Opposition
2001	11th	AIADMK, and PMK	30	3 / 30	▼9	20.27%	▼17.60%	96.714	Government
2006	12th	AIADMK, MDMK, PMC, and VCK	30	7 / 30	▲4	27.97%	▲7.70%	158,144	Others
2011	13th	AIADMK, AINRC, CPI, CPI(M), and DMDK	30	20 / 30	▲13	48.41%	▲20.44%	337,859	Alliance Broken
2016	14th	AIADMK	30	4 / 30	▼16	16.82%	▼31.59%	134,597	Others
2021	15th	AIADMK, AINRC, and BJP	30	16 / 30	▲12	43.65%	▲26.83%	365,170	Government
2026	16th	AIADMK, AINRC, BJP and LJK	30	18 / 30	▲2	38.70%	▼4.95%	335,177	Government

== List of members ==
No.	Political party	Flag	Election symbol	Leader	Seats				ECI Status
No.	Political party	Flag	Election symbol	Leader	Lok Sabha in TN and PY	Rajya Sabha in TN and PY	Tamil Nadu Legislative Assembly	Puducherry Legislative Assembly	ECI Status
1	All India Anna Dravida Munnetra Kazhagam (AIADMK)			Edappadi K. Palaniswami	0 / 40	4 / 19	41 / 234	1 / 30	State Party in Puducherry and Tamil Nadu
2	Bharatiya Janata Party (BJP)			Nainar Nagenthran	0 / 40	1 / 19	1 / 234	6 / 30	National Party
3	All India N. R. Congress (AINRC)			N. Rangasamy	0 / 40	0 / 19	0 / 234	10 / 30	State Party in Puducherry
4	Amma Makkal Munnettra Kazhagam (AMMK)			T. T. V. Dhinakaran	0 / 40	0 / 19	0 / 234	0 / 30	Unrecognised Party in Tamil Nadu
5	Indhiya Jananayaga Katchi (IJK)			T. R. Paarivendhar	0 / 40	0 / 19	0 / 234	0 / 30	Unrecognised Party in Tamil Nadu
6	Puthiya Needhi Katchi (PNK)			A. C. Shanmugam	0 / 40	0 / 19	0 / 234	0 / 30	Unrecognised Party in Tamil Nadu
7	Tamil Maanila Bahujan Samaj Party (TMBSP)			Porkodi Armstrong	0 / 40	0 / 19	0 / 234	0 / 30	Unrecognised Party in Tamil Nadu
TOTAL					0 / 40	5 / 19	42 / 234	17 / 30	Steady

== Withdrawals ==
Political Party	ECI Status	Date	Reason for Withdrawal
Indian National Congress	National Party	28 September 2001	AIADMK broke the alliance for local body elections
Communist Party of India (Marxist)	National Party	6 March 2014	Seat sharing problem in 2014 Indian general election
Communist Party of India	State Party	6 March 2014	Seat sharing problem in 2014 Indian general election
Indian Union Muslim League	State Party	3 January 2004	Aligned with the Democratic Progressive Alliance
Viduthalai Chiruthaigal Katchi	State Party	27 September 2006	Aligned with the Democratic Progressive Alliance
Manithaneya Makkal Katchi	Unrecognised Party	10 January 2014	Aligned with the Democratic Progressive Alliance
Marumalarchi Dravida Munnetra Kazhagam	Unrecognised Party	20 March 2011	Seat share problem in 2011 Tamil Nadu Legislative Assembly election
Puducherry Munnetra Congress (In Puducherry)	Unrecognised Party	6 June 2006	Quit the alliance after 2006 Pondicherry Assembly Election
All India Forward Bloc	State Party	19 April 2025	Quit the alliance due to AIADMK aligned with the National Democratic Alliance
Social Democratic Party of India	Unrecognised Party	19 April 2025	Quit the alliance due to AIADMK aligned with the National Democratic Alliance
Desiya Murpokku Dravida Kazhagam	State Party	19 February 2026	Aligned with the Secular Progressive Alliance
Tamil Maanila Congress (Moopanar)	Unrecognised Party	14 June 2026	Quit the alliance after 2026 Tamil Nadu Assembly Election
Tamizhaga Makkal Munnetra Kazhagam	Unrecognised Party	22 June 2026	Quit the alliance after 2026 Tamil Nadu Assembly Election
Pattali Makkal Katchi	Unrecognised Party	18 September 2026	Quit the alliance after 2026 Tamil Nadu Assembly Election

== Legislative leaders ==
=== List of presidents ===
No.	Portrait	Name (Birth–Death)	Home state	Term in office			Election
No.	Portrait	Name (Birth–Death)	Home state	Assumed office	Left office	Time in office	Election
1		Fakhruddin Ali Ahmed (1905–1977)	National Capital Territory of Delhi	24 August 1974	11 February 1977	2 years, 171 days	1974
2		Neelam Sanjiva Reddy (1913–1996)	Andhra Pradesh	25 July 1977	25 July 1982	5 years	1977
3		Giani Zail Singh (1916–1994)	Punjab	25 July 1982	25 July 1987	5 years	1982
4		R. Venkataraman (1910–2009)	Tamil Nadu	25 July 1987	25 July 1992	5 years	1987
5		Shankar Dayal Sharma (1918–1999)	Madhya Pradesh	25 July 1992	25 July 1997	5 years	1992
6		K. R. Narayanan (1920–2005)	Kerala	25 July 1997	25 July 2002	5 years	1997
7		A. P. J. Abdul Kalam (1931–2015)	Tamil Nadu	25 July 2002	25 July 2007	5 years	2002
8		Ram Nath Kovind (b. 1945)	Uttar Pradesh	25 July 2017	25 July 2022	5 years	2017
9		Droupadi Murmu (b. 1958)	Odisha	25 July 2022	Incumbent	4 years, 55 days	2022

=== List of vice presidents ===
No.	Portrait	Name (Birth–Death)	Home state	Term in office			Election
No.	Portrait	Name (Birth–Death)	Home state	Assumed office	Left office	Time in office	Election
1		B. D. Jatti (1912–2002)	Karnataka	31 August 1974	30 August 1979	5 years	1974
2		M. Hidayatullah (1905–1992)	Madhya Pradesh	31 August 1979	30 August 1984	5 years	1979
3		R. Venkataraman (1910–2009)	Tamil Nadu	31 August 1984	24 July 1987	2 years, 327 days	1984
4		Shankar Dayal Sharma (1918–1999)	Madhya Pradesh	3 September 1987	24 July 1992	4 years, 325 days	1987
5		K. R. Narayanan (1920–2005)	Kerala	21 August 1992	24 July 1997	4 years, 337 days	1992
6		M. Venkaiah Naidu (b. 1948)	Andhra Pradesh	11 August 2017	10 August 2022	4 years, 364 days	2017
7		Jagdeep Dhankhar (b. 1950)	Rajasthan	11 August 2022	21 July 2025	2 years, 345 days	2022
8		C. P. Radhakrishnan (b. 1957)	Tamil Nadu	12 September 2025	Incumbent	1 year, 6 days	2025

=== List of prime ministers ===
No.	Portrait	Name (Birth–Death)	Term in office			Lok Sabha (Election)	Elected constituency (House)
No.	Portrait	Name (Birth–Death)	Assumed office	Left office	Time in office	Lok Sabha (Election)	Elected constituency (House)
1		Morarji Desai (1896–1995)	24 March 1977	28 July 1979	2 years, 126 days	6th (1977)	Surat (Lok Sabha)
2		Charan Singh (1902–1987)	28 July 1979	14 January 1980	170 days	6th (1977)	Baghpat (Lok Sabha)
3		Rajiv Gandhi (1944–1991)	31 December 1984	2 December 1989	4 years, 336 days	8th (1984)	Amethi (Lok Sabha)
4		P. V. Narasimha Rao (1921–2004)	21 June 1991	16 May 1996	4 years, 330 days	10th (1991)	Nandyal (Lok Sabha)
5		Atal Bihari Vajpayee (1924–2018)	19 March 1998	8 April 1999	1 year, 116 days	12th (1998)	Lucknow (Lok Sabha)
5		Atal Bihari Vajpayee (1924–2018)	15 February 2004	21 May 2004	1 year, 116 days	13th (1999)	Lucknow (Lok Sabha)
6		Narendra Modi (b. 1950)	19 February 2019	25 September 2023		17th (2019)	Varanasi (Lok Sabha)
6		Narendra Modi (b. 1950)	11 April 2025	Incumbent		18th (2024)	Varanasi (Lok Sabha)

=== List of deputy prime ministers ===
No.	Portrait	Name (Birth–Death)	Term in office			Lok Sabha (Election)	Elected constituency (House)	Prime Minister
No.	Portrait	Name (Birth–Death)	Assumed office	Left office	Time in office	Lok Sabha (Election)	Elected constituency (House)	Prime Minister
1		Charan Singh (1902–1987)	24 January 1979	16 July 1979	173 days	6th (1977)	Baghpat (Lok Sabha)	Morarji Desai
2		Jagjivan Ram (1908–1986)	24 January 1979	28 July 1979	185 days	6th (1977)	Sasaram (Lok Sabha)	Morarji Desai
3		Yashwantrao Chavan (1913–1984)	28 July 1979	14 January 1980	170 days	6th (1977)	Satara (Lok Sabha)	Charan Singh

=== List of union cabinet ministers ===
No.	Portrait	Name (Birth–Death)	Portfolio	Term in office			Elected constituency (House)	Prime Minister
No.	Portrait	Name (Birth–Death)	Portfolio	Assumed office	Left office	Time in office	Elected constituency (House)	Prime Minister
1		P. Ramachandran (1921–2001)	Ministry of Energy	26 March 1977	28 July 1979	2 years, 124 days	Chennai Central (Lok Sabha)	Morarji Desai
2		C. Subramaniam (1910–2000)	Ministry of Defence	30 July 1979	14 January 1980	168 days	Palani (Lok Sabha)	Charan Singh
3		Sathiavani Muthu (1923–1999)	Ministry of Social Welfare	19 August 1979	23 December 1979	126 days	Tamil Nadu (Rajya Sabha)	Charan Singh
4		Aravinda Bala Pajanor (1935–2013)	Ministry of Petroleum, Chemicals and Fertilizers	19 August 1979	23 December 1979	126 days	Puducherry (Lok Sabha)	Charan Singh
5		Sedapatti R. Muthiah (1945–2022)	Ministry of Surface Transport	19 March 1998	8 April 1998	20 days	Periyakulam (Lok Sabha)	Atal Bihari Vajpayee
6		M. Thambidurai (b. 1947)	Ministry of Law and Justice and Company Affairs	19 March 1998	8 April 1999	1 year, 20 days	Karur (Lok Sabha)	Atal Bihari Vajpayee
6		M. Thambidurai (b. 1947)	Ministry of Surface Transport	8 April 1998	8 April 1999	1 year	Karur (Lok Sabha)	Atal Bihari Vajpayee
7		Valappaddy K. Ramamurthy (1940–2002)	Ministry of Petroleum and Natural Gas	19 March 1998	13 October 1999	1 year, 208 days	Salem (Lok Sabha)	Atal Bihari Vajpayee
8		Rangarajan Kumaramangalam (1952–2000)	Ministry of Power	19 March 1998	13 October 1999	1 year, 208 days	Tiruchirappalli (Lok Sabha)	Atal Bihari Vajpayee
8		Rangarajan Kumaramangalam (1952–2000)	Ministry of Parliamentary Affairs	30 January 1999	13 October 1999	256 days	Tiruchirappalli (Lok Sabha)	Atal Bihari Vajpayee
8		Rangarajan Kumaramangalam (1952–2000)	Ministry of Non-Conventional Energy Sources	3 February 1999	13 October 1999	252 days	Tiruchirappalli (Lok Sabha)	Atal Bihari Vajpayee
8		Rangarajan Kumaramangalam (1952–2000)	Ministry of Non-Conventional Energy Sources	9 April 1999	8 June 1999	60 days	Tiruchirappalli (Lok Sabha)	Atal Bihari Vajpayee

=== List of union ministers of state (independent charge) ===
No.	Portrait	Name (Birth–Death)	Portfolio	Term in office			Elected constituency (House)	Prime Minister
No.	Portrait	Name (Birth–Death)	Portfolio	Assumed office	Left office	Time in office	Elected constituency (House)	Prime Minister
1		K. Gopal (1934–unknown)	Ministry of Parliamentary Affairs	4 August 1979	14 January 1980	163 days	Karur (Lok Sabha)	Charan Singh
2		Maragatham Chandrasekhar (1917–2001)	Ministry of Women and Social Welfare	31 December 1984	25 September 1985	268 days	Nominated (Rajya Sabha)	Rajiv Gandhi
3		P. Chidambaram (b. 1945)	Ministry of Commerce	21 June 1991	9 July 1992	2 years, 71 days	Sivaganga (Lok Sabha)	P. V. Narasimha Rao
3		P. Chidambaram (b. 1945)	Ministry of Commerce	10 February 1995	3 April 1996	2 years, 71 days	Sivaganga (Lok Sabha)	P. V. Narasimha Rao
4		Valappaddy K. Ramamurthy (1940–2002)	Ministry of Labour	21 June 1991	30 July 1991	39 days	Krishnagiri (Lok Sabha)	P. V. Narasimha Rao
5		Dalit Ezhilmalai (1945–2020)	Ministry of Health and Family Welfare	20 March 1998	14 August 1999	1 year, 147 days	Chidambaram (Lok Sabha)	Atal Bihari Vajpayee

=== List of chief ministers ===
==== Chief Ministers of Tamil Nadu ====
No.	Portrait	Name (Birth–Death)	Term in office			Assembly (Election)	Elected constituency	Ministry
No.	Portrait	Name (Birth–Death)	Assumed office	Left office	Time in office	Assembly (Election)	Elected constituency	Ministry
1		M. G. Ramachandran (1917–1987)	30 June 1977	17 February 1980	10 years, 65 days	6th (1977)	Aruppukkottai	Ramachandran I
1		M. G. Ramachandran (1917–1987)	9 June 1980	9 February 1985	10 years, 65 days	7th (1980)	Madurai West	Ramachandran II
1		M. G. Ramachandran (1917–1987)	10 February 1985	24 December 1987	10 years, 65 days	8th (1984)	Andipatti	Ramachandran III
Acting		V. R. Nedunchezhiyan (1920–2000)	24 December 1987	7 January 1988	14 days	8th (1984)	Athoor	Nedunchezhiyan II
2		V. N. Janaki Ramachandran (1923–1996)	7 January 1988	30 January 1988	23 days	8th (1984)	did not contest	Janaki
3		J. Jayalalithaa (1948–2016)	24 June 1991	12 May 1996	14 years, 124 days	10th (1991)	Bargur	Jayalalithaa I
3		J. Jayalalithaa (1948–2016)	14 May 2001	21 September 2001	14 years, 124 days	12th (2001)	did not contest	Jayalalithaa II
3		J. Jayalalithaa (1948–2016)	2 March 2002	12 May 2006	14 years, 124 days	12th (2001)	Andipatti	Jayalalithaa III
3		J. Jayalalithaa (1948–2016)	16 May 2011	27 September 2014	14 years, 124 days	14th (2011)	Srirangam	Jayalalithaa IV
3		J. Jayalalithaa (1948–2016)	23 May 2015	22 May 2016	14 years, 124 days	14th (2011)	Dr. Radhakrishnan Nagar	Jayalalithaa V
3		J. Jayalalithaa (1948–2016)	23 May 2016	5 December 2016	14 years, 124 days	15th (2016)	Dr. Radhakrishnan Nagar	Jayalalithaa VI
4		O. Panneerselvam (b. 1951)	21 September 2001	2 March 2002	1 year, 105 days	12th (2001)	Periyakulam	Panneerselvam I
4		O. Panneerselvam (b. 1951)	28 September 2014	23 May 2015	1 year, 105 days	14th (2011)	Bodinayakanur	Panneerselvam II
4		O. Panneerselvam (b. 1951)	6 December 2016	15 February 2017	1 year, 105 days	15th (2016)	Bodinayakanur	Panneerselvam III
5		Edappadi K. Palaniswami (b. 1954)	16 February 2017	6 May 2021	4 years, 79 days	15th (2016)	Edappadi	Palaniswami

==== Chief Minister of Puducherry ====
No.	Portrait	Name (Birth–Death)	Term in office			Assembly (Election)	Elected constituency	Ministry
No.	Portrait	Name (Birth–Death)	Assumed office	Left office	Time in office	Assembly (Election)	Elected constituency	Ministry
1		S. Ramassamy (1939–2017)	6 March 1974	28 March 1974	1 year, 155 days	4th (1974)	Karaikal South	Ramassamy I
1		S. Ramassamy (1939–2017)	2 July 1977	12 November 1978	1 year, 155 days	5th (1977)	Karaikal South	Ramassamy II
2		M. O. H. Farook (1937–2012)	16 March 1985	7 March 1990	4 years, 356 days	7th (1985)	Lawspet	Farook III
3		V. Vaithilingam (b. 1950)	4 July 1991	25 May 1996	4 years, 326 days	9th (1991)	Nettapakkam	Vaithilingam I
4		P. Shanmugam (1927–2013)	22 March 2000	23 May 2001	1 year, 62 days	10th (1996)	Yanam	Shanmugam I

==== Chief Minister of Karnataka ====
No.	Portrait	Name (Birth–Death)	Term in office			Assembly (Election)	Elected constituency	Ministry
No.	Portrait	Name (Birth–Death)	Assumed office	Left office	Time in office	Assembly (Election)	Elected constituency	Ministry
1		Veerendra Patil (1924–1997)	30 November 1989	10 October 1990	314 days	9th (1989)	Chincholi	Patil II
2		S. Bangarappa (1933–2011)	17 October 1990	19 November 1992	2 years, 33 days	9th (1989)	Soraba	Bangarappa
3		M. Veerappa Moily (b. 1940)	19 November 1992	11 December 1994	2 years, 22 days	9th (1989)	Karkala	Moily

=== List of deputy chief ministers ===
==== Deputy Chief Minister of Tamil Nadu ====
No.	Portrait	Name (Birth–Death)	Term in office			Assembly (Election)	Elected constituency	Chief Minister
No.	Portrait	Name (Birth–Death)	Assumed office	Left office	Time in office	Assembly (Election)	Elected constituency	Chief Minister
1		O. Panneerselvam (b. 1951)	21 August 2017	6 May 2021	3 years, 258 days	15th (2016)	Bodinayakanur	Edappadi K. Palaniswami

=== List of deputy speakers of the Lok Sabha ===
No.	Portrait	Name (Birth–Death)	Term in office			Lok Sabha (Election)	Elected constituency	Speaker
No.	Portrait	Name (Birth–Death)	Assumed office	Left office	Time in office	Lok Sabha (Election)	Elected constituency	Speaker
1		M. Thambidurai (b. 1947)	22 January 1985	27 November 1989	9 years, 229 days	8th (1984)	Dharmapuri	Balram Jakhar
1		M. Thambidurai (b. 1947)	13 August 2014	25 May 2019	9 years, 229 days	16th (2014)	Karur	Sumitra Mahajan

=== List of union ministers of state ===
No.	Portrait	Name (Birth–Death)	Portfolio	Term in office			Elected constituency (House)	Cabinet Minister	Prime Minister
No.	Portrait	Name (Birth–Death)	Portfolio	Assumed office	Left office	Time in office	Elected constituency (House)	Cabinet Minister	Prime Minister
1		P. Chidambaram (b. 1945)	Ministry of Personnel, Public Grievances and Pensions	20 January 1986	2 December 1989	3 years, 316 days	Sivaganga (Lok Sabha)	Rajiv Gandhi	Rajiv Gandhi
1		P. Chidambaram (b. 1945)	Ministry of Home Affairs	24 June 1986	2 December 1989	3 years, 161 days	Sivaganga (Lok Sabha)	P. V. Narasimha Rao Buta Singh	Rajiv Gandhi
2		R. Prabhu (b. 1947)	Ministry of Agriculture	22 October 1986	2 December 1989	3 years, 41 days	Nilgiris (Lok Sabha)	Gurdial Singh Dhillon Bhajan Lal Bishnoi	Rajiv Gandhi
3		M. Arunachalam (1944–2004)	Ministry of Industry	25 September 1985	2 December 1989	4 years, 68 days	Tenkasi (Lok Sabha)	N. D. Tiwari Jalagam Vengala Rao	Rajiv Gandhi
3		M. Arunachalam (1944–2004)	Ministry of Urban Development	21 June 1991	18 January 1993	1 year, 211 days	Tenkasi (Lok Sabha)	Sheila Kaul	P. V. Narasimha Rao
3		M. Arunachalam (1944–2004)	Ministry of Small Scale Industries and Agro Industries	18 January 1993	3 April 1996	3 years, 76 days	Tenkasi (Lok Sabha)	K. Karunakaran	P. V. Narasimha Rao
4		Rangarajan Kumaramangalam (1952–2000)	Ministry of Parliamentary Affairs	21 June 1991	2 July 1992	1 year, 11 days	Salem (Lok Sabha)	Ghulam Nabi Azad	P. V. Narasimha Rao
4		Rangarajan Kumaramangalam (1952–2000)	Ministry of Law and Justice and Company Affairs	21 June 1991	2 July 1992	1 year, 11 days	Salem (Lok Sabha)	Kotla Vijaya Bhaskara Reddy	P. V. Narasimha Rao
4		Rangarajan Kumaramangalam (1952–2000)	Ministry of Science and Technology	2 July 1992	2 December 1993	1 year, 153 days	Salem (Lok Sabha)	P. V. Narasimha Rao	P. V. Narasimha Rao
4		Rangarajan Kumaramangalam (1952–2000)	Ministry of Parliamentary Affairs	2 July 1992	2 December 1993	1 year, 153 days	Salem (Lok Sabha)	Ghulam Nabi Azad Vidya Charan Shukla	P. V. Narasimha Rao
5		R. K. Kumar (1942–1999)	Ministry of Parliamentary Affairs	19 March 1998	22 May 1998	64 days	Tamil Nadu (Rajya Sabha)	Madan Lal Khurana	Atal Bihari Vajpayee
5		R. K. Kumar (1942–1999)	Ministry of Finance	20 March 1998	22 May 1998	63 days	Tamil Nadu (Rajya Sabha)	Yashwant Sinha	Atal Bihari Vajpayee
6		Kadambur M. R. Janarthanan (1929–2020)	Ministry of Personnel, Public Grievances and Pensions	20 March 1998	8 April 1999	1 year, 19 days	Tirunelveli (Lok Sabha)	Atal Bihari Vajpayee	Atal Bihari Vajpayee
6		Kadambur M. R. Janarthanan (1929–2020)	Ministry of Finance	22 May 1998	8 April 1999	321 days	Tirunelveli (Lok Sabha)	Yashwant Sinha	Atal Bihari Vajpayee

=== List of speakers ===
==== Speakers of the Tamil Nadu Legislative Assembly ====
No.	Portrait	Name (Birth–Death)	Term in office			Assembly (Election)	Elected constituency
No.	Portrait	Name (Birth–Death)	Assumed office	Left office	Time in office	Assembly (Election)	Elected constituency
1		Munu Adhi (1926–2005)	6 July 1977	18 June 1980	2 years, 348 days	6th (1977)	Tambaram
2		K. Rajaram (1926–2008)	21 June 1980	24 February 1985	4 years, 248 days	7th (1980)	Panamarathupatti
3		P. H. Pandian (1945–2020)	27 February 1985	5 February 1989	3 years, 344 days	8th (1984)	Cheranmadevi
4		Sedapatti R. Muthiah (1945–2022)	3 July 1991	21 May 1996	4 years, 323 days	10th (1991)	Sedapatti
5		K. Kalimuthu (1942–2006)	24 May 2001	1 February 2006	4 years, 253 days	12th (2001)	Thirumangalam
6		D. Jayakumar (b. 1960)	27 May 2011	29 September 2012	1 year, 125 days	14th (2011)	Royapuram
7		P. Dhanapal (b. 1951)	10 October 2012	24 May 2016	8 years, 196 days	14th (2011)	Rasipuram
7		P. Dhanapal (b. 1951)	3 June 2016	3 May 2021	8 years, 196 days	15th (2016)	Avanashi

====Speaker of the Puducherry Legislative Assembly====

No.	Portrait	Name (Birth–Death)	Term in office			Assembly (Election)	Elected constituency
No.	Portrait	Name (Birth–Death)	Assumed office	Left office	Time in office	Assembly (Election)	Elected constituency
1		S. Pakkiam (Unknown)	26 March 1974	28 March 1974	2 days	4th (1974)	Bussy

=== List of deputy speakers ===
==== Deputy Speakers of the Tamil Nadu Legislative Assembly ====
No.	Portrait	Name (Birth–Death)	Term in office			Assembly (Election)	Elected constituency	Speaker
No.	Portrait	Name (Birth–Death)	Assumed office	Left office	Time in office	Assembly (Election)	Elected constituency	Speaker
1		Su. Thirunavukkarasar (b. 1949)	6 July 1977	17 February 1980	2 years, 226 days	6th (1977)	Arantangi	Munu Adhi
2		P. H. Pandian (1945–2020)	21 June 1980	15 November 1984	4 years, 147 days	7th (1980)	Cheranmadevi	K. Rajaram
3		V. P. Balasubramanian (1946–2003)	27 February 1985	30 January 1988	2 years, 337 days	8th (1984)	Vedasandur	P. H. Pandian
4		K. Ponnusamy (b. 1942)	3 July 1991	16 May 1993	1 year, 317 days	10th (1991)	Marungapuri	Sedapatti R. Muthiah
5		S. Gandhirajan (b. 1951)	27 October 1993	13 May 1996	2 years, 199 days	10th (1991)	Vedasandur	Sedapatti R. Muthiah
6		A. Arunachalam (b. 1948)	24 May 2001	12 May 2006	4 years, 353 days	12th (2001)	Varahur	K. Kalimuthu
7		P. Dhanapal (b. 1951)	27 May 2011	9 October 2012	1 year, 135 days	14th (2011)	Rasipuram	D. Jayakumar
8		Pollachi V. Jayaraman (b. 1952)	29 October 2012	21 May 2016	8 years, 174 days	14th (2011)	Udumalaipettai	P. Dhanapal
8		Pollachi V. Jayaraman (b. 1952)	3 June 2016	3 May 2021	8 years, 174 days	15th (2016)	Pollachi	P. Dhanapal

=== List of leaders of the house ===
==== Leaders of the House in the Tamil Nadu Legislative Assembly ====
No.	Portrait	Name (Birth–Death)	Term in office			Assembly (Election)	Elected constituency
No.	Portrait	Name (Birth–Death)	Assumed office	Left office	Time in office	Assembly (Election)	Elected constituency
1		Nanjil K. Manoharan (1929–2000)	4 July 1977	17 February 1980	2 years, 228 days	6th (1977)	Palayamkottai
2		V. R. Nedunchezhiyan (1920–2000)	19 June 1980	15 November 1984	12 years, 51 days	7th (1980)	Tirunelveli
2		V. R. Nedunchezhiyan (1920–2000)	25 February 1985	6 January 1988	12 years, 51 days	8th (1984)	Athoor
2		V. R. Nedunchezhiyan (1920–2000)	1 July 1991	13 May 1996	12 years, 51 days	10th (1991)	Theni
3		R. M. Veerappan (1926–2024)	7 January 1988	30 January 1988	23 days	8th (1984)	Tirunelveli
4		C. Ponnaiyan (b. 1942)	22 May 2001	12 May 2006	4 years, 355 days	12th (2001)	Tiruchengode
5		O. Panneerselvam (b. 1951)	23 May 2011	27 November 2014	8 years 127 days	14th (2011)	Bodinayakkanur
5		O. Panneerselvam (b. 1951)	12 August 2015	21 May 2016	8 years 127 days	14th (2011)	Bodinayakkanur
5		O. Panneerselvam (b. 1951)	25 May 2016	16 February 2017	8 years 127 days	15th (2016)	Bodinayakkanur
5		O. Panneerselvam (b. 1951)	4 January 2018	3 May 2021	8 years 127 days	15th (2016)	Bodinayakkanur
6		Natham R. Viswanathan (b. 1949)	28 November 2014	11 August 2015	256 days	14th (2011)	Natham
7		K. A. Sengottaiyan (b. 1948)	17 February 2017	3 January 2018	320 days	15th (2016)	Gobichettipalayam

==== Leader of the House in the Puducherry Legislative Assembly ====
No.	Portrait	Name (Birth–Death)	Term in office			Assembly (Election)	Elected constituency
No.	Portrait	Name (Birth–Death)	Assumed office	Left office	Time in office	Assembly (Election)	Elected constituency
1		S. Ramassamy (1939–2017)	6 March 1974	28 March 1974	1 year, 155 days	4th (1974)	Karaikal South
1		S. Ramassamy (1939–2017)	2 July 1977	12 November 1978	1 year, 155 days	5th (1977)	Karaikal South

=== List of leaders of the opposition ===
==== Leaders of the Opposition in the Tamil Nadu Legislative Assembly ====
No.	Portrait	Name (Birth–Death)	Term in office			Assembly (Election)	Elected constituency
No.	Portrait	Name (Birth–Death)	Assumed office	Left office	Time in office	Assembly (Election)	Elected constituency
1		J. Jayalalithaa (1948–2016)	9 February 1989	1 December 1989	5 years, 280 days	9th (1989)	Bodinayakanur
1		J. Jayalalithaa (1948–2016)	29 May 2006	14 May 2011	5 years, 280 days	13th (2006)	Andipatti
2		S. R. Eradha (1934–2020)	1 December 1989	19 January 1991	1 year, 49 days	9th (1989)	Madurai East
3		G. K. Moopanar (1931–2001)	19 January 1991	30 January 1991	11 days	9th (1989)	Papanasam
4		S. R. Balasubramoniyan (b. 1938)	3 July 1991	13 May 1996	4 years, 315 days	10th (1991)	Pongalur
5		O. Panneerselvam (b. 1951)	19 May 2006	28 May 2006	9 days	13th (2006)	Periyakulam
6		Vijayakant (1952–2023)	27 May 2011	21 February 2016	4 years, 270 days	14th (2011)	Rishivandiyam
7		Edappadi K. Palaniswami (b. 1954)	11 May 2021	10 May 2026	4 years, 364 days	16th (2021)	Edappadi

==== Leaders of the Opposition in the Puducherry Legislative Assembly ====
No.	Portrait	Name (Birth–Death)	Term in office			Assembly (Election)	Elected constituency
No.	Portrait	Name (Birth–Death)	Assumed office	Left office	Time in office	Assembly (Election)	Elected constituency
1		P. K. Loganathan (1938–2013)	16 March 1985	4 March 1990	4 years, 353 days	7th (1985)	Oupalam
2		V. M. C. V. Ganapathy (b. 1960)	4 July 1991	13 May 1996	4 years, 314 days	9th (1991)	Neravy – T. R. Pattinam

=== List of deputy leaders of the opposition ===
==== Deputy Leaders of the Opposition in the Tamil Nadu Legislative Assembly ====
No.	Portrait	Name (Birth–Death)	Term in office			Assembly (Election)	Elected constituency	Leader of the Opposition
No.	Portrait	Name (Birth–Death)	Assumed office	Left office	Time in office	Assembly (Election)	Elected constituency	Leader of the Opposition
1		Su. Thirunavukkarasar (b. 1949)	9 February 1989	23 July 1990	1 year, 164 days	9th (1989)	Aranthangi	J. Jayalalithaa S. R. Eradha
2		K. A. Sengottaiyan (b. 1948)	23 June 1990	19 January 1991	189 days	9th (1989)	Gobichettipalayam	S. R. Eradha
2		K. A. Sengottaiyan (b. 1948)	19 May 2006	28 May 2006	189 days	13th (2006)	Gobichettipalayam	O. Panneerselvam
3		O. Panneerselvam (b. 1951)	29 May 2006	14 May 2011	6 years, 12 days	13th (2006)	Periyakulam	J. Jayalalithaa
3		O. Panneerselvam (b. 1951)	14 June 2021	11 July 2022	6 years, 12 days	16th (2021)	Bodinayakanur	Edappadi K. Palaniswami
4		R. B. Udhayakumar (b. 1973)	19 July 2022	10 May 2026	3 years, 295 days	16th (2021)	Thirumangalam	Edappadi K. Palaniswami

== See also ==
- AINRC-led Alliance
- National Democratic Alliance
- Secular Progressive Alliance
- Secular Social Justice Victory Alliance
- Indian National Developmental Inclusive Alliance
