= Bangarappa ministry =

Government of Karnataka, India (1990–92)

- 19th Ministry of the State of Karnataka
- Date formed: 17 October 1990
- Date dissolved: 19 November 1992

People and organisations
- Head of state: Bhanu Pratap Singh (8 May 1990 – 6 – January 1992); Khurshed Alam Khan (6 January 1992 – 2 December 1999)
- Head of government: S. Bangarappa
- Member parties: Indian National Congress
- Status in legislature: Majority
- Opposition party: Janata Dal
- Opposition leader: D. B. Chandregowda; R. V. Deshpande(assembly)

History
- Election: 1989
- Outgoing election: 1994 (After Moily ministry)
- Legislature term: 2 years 1 month
- Predecessor: Second Veerendra Patil ministry
- Successor: Moily ministry

Bangarappa ministry was the Council of Ministers in Karnataka, a state in South India headed by S. Bangarappa that was formed after Veerendra Patil submitted resignation.

In the government headed by S. Bangarappa, the Chief Minister was from INC. Apart from the CM, there were other ministers in the government.

== Tenure of the Government ==
In 1989, Indian National Congress emerged victorious and Veerendra Patil was elected as leader of the Party, hence sworn in as CM in 1989. A year later he submitted resignation and President's Rule was imposed and S. Bangarappa sworn in as Chief Minister later. The ministry was dissolved when S. Bangarappa submitted resignation and M. Veerappa Moily was elected as CM and S. M. Krishna was picked as Deputy Chief Minister in 1992.

== Council of Ministers ==
Sr. No.	Name	MLA/MLC	Constituency	Designation	Portfolio(s)	Party	Term of Office	
Sr. No.	Name	MLA/MLC	Constituency	Designation	Portfolio(s)	Party	Took Office	Left Office
Chief Minister
1.	S. Bangarappa	MLA	Sorab	Chief Minister	Other departments not allocated to a Minister	Indian National Congress	17 October 1990	19 November 1992
Cabinet Ministers
2.	M. Veerappa Moily	MLA	Karkala	Cabinet Minister	Law; Youth Service, Culture, Information; Parliamentary Affairs; Primary & Secondary Education	Indian National Congress	20 October 1990	19 November 1992
3.	Mallikarjun Kharge	MLA	Gurmitkal	Cabinet Minister	Revenue; Rural Development; Panchayati Raj	Indian National Congress	20 October 1990	19 November 1992
4.	K. S. Nagarathnamma	MLA	Gundlupet	Cabinet Minister	Health & Family Welfare	Indian National Congress	20 October 1990	19 November 1992
5.	K. H. Patil	MLA	Gadag	Cabinet Minister	Rural Development	Indian National Congress	20 October 1990	9 February 1992
6.	K. J. George	MLA	Bharathinagar	Cabinet Minister	Housing; Urban Development	Indian National Congress	20 October 1990	19 November 1992
7.	V. Muniyappa	MLA	Sidlaghatta	Cabinet Minister	Sericulture	Indian National Congress	20 October 1990	19 November 1992
8.	D. K. Shivakumar	MLA	Sathanur	Minister of State	Prisons and Home Guards	Indian National Congress	20 October 1990	19 November 1992

If the office of a minister is vacant for any length of time, it automatically comes under the charge of the chief minister.

== See also ==
- Karnataka Legislative Assembly
