= Tiruvannamalai special grade municipality =

Tiruvannamalai Municipality திருவண்ணாமலை மாநகராட்சி
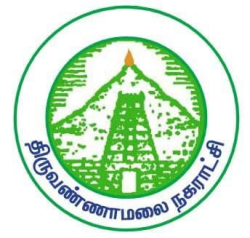

History
- Founded: October 21, 1866; 159 years ago

Leadership
- Chairman: Nirmala Karthivelmaran (DMK)
- Deputy Chairman: Sumathi Arul (DMK)

Structure
- Seats: 39
- Political groups: Government (32) SPA (32): DMK (30); INC (2); Opposition (6): AIADMK (6); Others (1): Independent (1)

Tiruvannamalai special grade municipality is the civic agency which governs urban area of Tiruvannamalai in the south Indian state of Tamil Nadu. . It was first constituted as Municipal body in the year 1866, being one of the oldest surviving municipal agency of Madras presidency. later upgraded into Second grade, first grade and selection grade municipalities in the past century and currently a special Grade municipal body, a superior agency with municipality status from the year 2008.
