= B. N. Ravi Kumar =

Indian politician (born 1969)

B. N. Ravi Kumar (born 1 January 1969) is an Indian politician from Karnataka. He is a member of the Karnataka Legislative Assembly from Sidlaghatta Assembly constituency in Chikkaballapura district. He was elected in the 2023 Karnataka Legislative Assembly election representing Janata Dal (Secular) party.

== Early life and education ==
Kumar is from Melur, in the erstwhile Kolar district, which is presently in Chikkaballapura district. His father B. Narayanaswamy is a farmer. He studied Class 7 at Government Higher Primary School, Melur and passed the examinations in 1988. He later discontinued his studies.

== Career ==
Kumar was first elected in the Sidlaghatta Assembly constituency representing the Janata Dal (Secular) Party in the 2023 Karnataka Legislative Assembly election. He polled 68,932 votes and defeated his nearest rival, Puttu Anjinappa, an independent candidate, by a margin of 16,772 votes and the Congress candidate B. V. Rajeev Gowda, who finished third. Earlier, he contested the 2018 Karnataka Legislative Assembly election, also on Janata Dal (Secular) ticket, but lost to V. Muniyappa of the Indian National Congress, by a margin of 9,709 votes. In 2018, he polled 66,531 votes against 76,240 votes garnered by Muniyappa.
