= Moily ministry =

Government of Karnataka, India (1992–94)

- 20th Ministry of the State of Karnataka
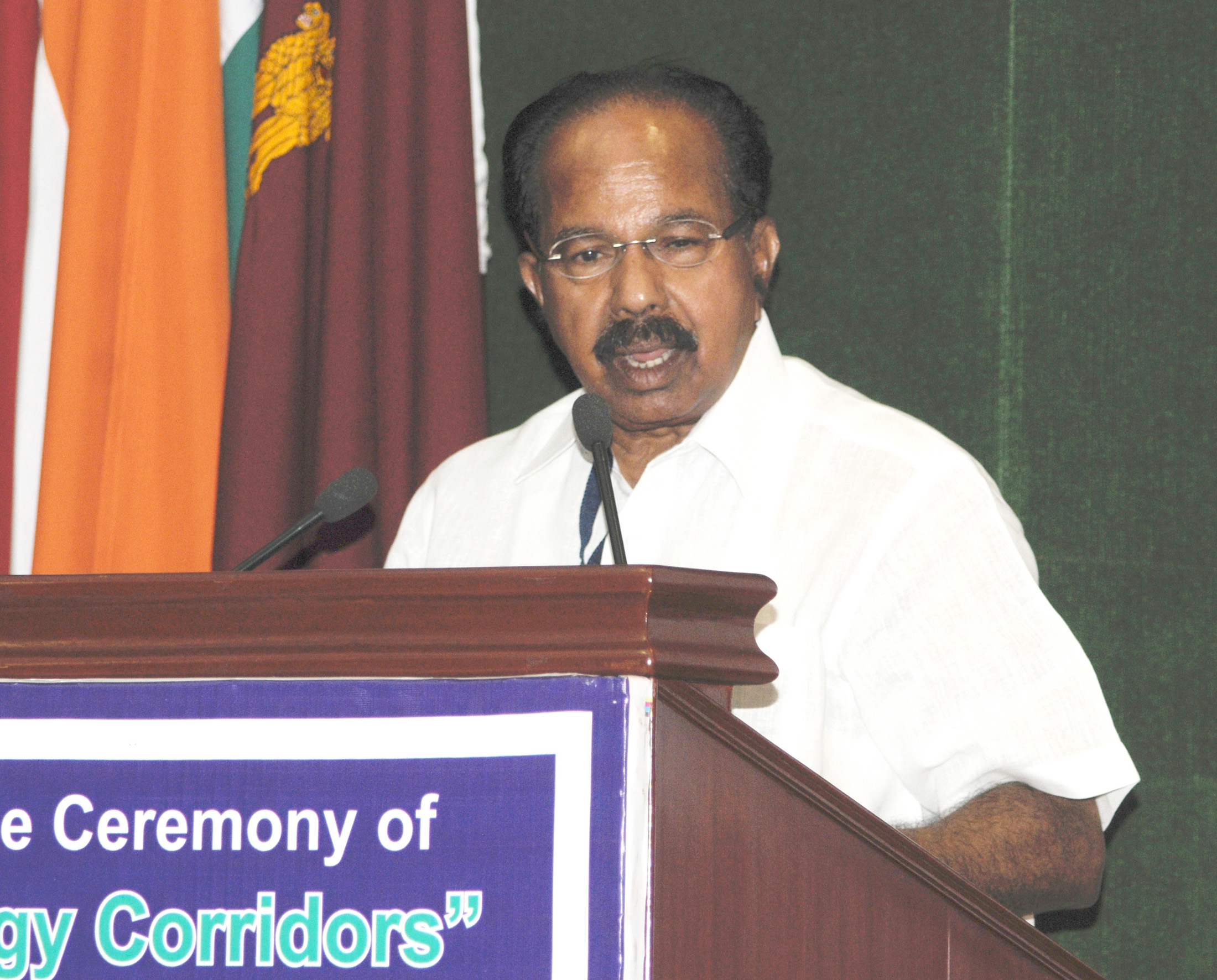
- M. Veerappa Moily; Chief Minister of Karnataka
- Date formed: 19 November 1992
- Date dissolved: 11 December 1994

People and organisations
- Head of state: Khurshed Alam Khan (6 January 1992 – 2 December 1999)
- Head of government: M. Veerappa Moily
- Deputy head of government: S. M. Krishna
- No. of ministers: 46
- Member parties: Janata Dal
- Status in legislature: Majority
- Opposition party: Indian National Congress
- Opposition leader: R. V. Deshpande(assembly)

History
- Election: 1989
- Outgoing election: 1994
- Legislature term: 2 years 22 days
- Predecessor: Bangarappa ministry
- Successor: Deve Gowda ministry

Moily ministry was the Council of Ministers in Karnataka, a state in South India headed by M. Veerappa Moily that was formed after S. Bangarappa submitted resignation.

In the government headed by M. Veerappa Moily, the Chief Minister was from Indian National Congress party. Apart from the CM, there were Deputy Chief Minister and other ministers in the government.

== Tenure of the Government ==
In 1989, Indian National Congress emerged victorious and Veerendra Patil was elected as leader of the Party, hence sworn in as CM in 1989. A year later he submitted resignation and President's Rule was imposed and S. Bangarappa sworn in as Chief Minister later. In 1992 S. Bangarappa submitted resignation and M. Veerappa Moily was elected as CM and S. M. Krishna was picked as Deputy Chief Minister. The ministry was dissolved when Indian National Congress lost badly in 1994 elections and H. D. Deve Gowda became the Chief Minister.

== Council of Ministers ==
=== Chief Minister and deputy Chief Minister ===
SI No.	Name	Constituency	Department	Term of Office		Party
1.	M. Veerappa Moily; Chief Minister	Karkala	Finance; Other departments not allocated to a Minister	19 November 1992	11 December 1994	Indian National Congress
2.	S. M. Krishna; Deputy chief Minister	Maddur	Irrigation; Energy	21 January 1993	11 December 1994	Indian National Congress

=== Cabinet Ministers ===
S.No	Portfolio	Minister	Constituency	Term of Office		Party
1.	Revenue	M. Rajasekara Murthy	Chamundeshwari	19 November 1992	11 December 1994	INC
2.	Transport	Bheemanna Khandre	MLC	19 November 1992	11 December 1994	INC
3.	Co-operation; Medium and Large Industries	Mallikarjun Kharge	Gurmitkal	19 November 1992	11 December 1994	INC
4.	Social Welfare	Kagodu Thimappa	Sagar	19 November 1992	11 December 1994	INC
5.	.	Raja Madan Gopal Naik	Shorapur	19 November 1992	11 December 1994	INC
6.	Command Area Development Authority	K. H. Hanume Gowda	Hassan	19 November 1992	11 December 1994	INC
7.	Forest	M. P. Keshavamurthy	Anekal	19 November 1992	11 December 1994	INC
8.	Industries	Ramalinga Reddy	Jayanagar	19 November 1992	11 December 1994	INC
9.	Energy	V. Muniyappa	Sidlaghatta	19 November 1992	11 December 1994	INC
10.	Labour	Blasius D'Souza	Mangalore City	19 November 1992	11 December 1994	INC
11.	Urban Development	Chowdareddy	Chintamani	19 November 1992	11 December 1994	INC

=== Minister of State ===
If the office of a Minister is vacant for any length of time, it automatically comes under the charge of the Chief Minister.

S.No	Portfolio	Minister	Constituency	Term of Office		Party
1.	Sericulture	G. Parameshwara	Madhugiri	19 November 1992	11 December 1994	INC
2.	Home (Prisons, Fire Force, and Home Guards); Excise	Ramanath Rai	Bantval	19 November 1992	11 December 1994	INC

== See also ==
- Karnataka Legislative Assembly
