= Second Veerendra Patil ministry =

Government of Karnataka, India (1989–1990)

- 18th Ministry of the State of Karnataka
- Date formed: 30 November 1989
- Date dissolved: 10 October 1990

People and organisations
- Head of state: Pendekanti Venkatasubbaiah (26 February 1987 – 5 February 1990); Bhanu Pratap Singh (8 May 1990 – 6 – January 1992)
- Head of government: Veerendra Patil
- No. of ministers: 13
- Member parties: Indian National Congress
- Status in legislature: Majority
- Opposition party: Janata Dal
- Opposition leader: D. B. Chandregowda(assembly)

History
- Election: 1989
- Outgoing election: 1994 (After Moily ministry)
- Legislature term: 10 months
- Predecessor: S. R. Bommai ministry
- Successor: Bangarappa ministry

Veerendra Patil ministry was the Council of Ministers in Karnataka, a state in South India headed by Veerendra Patil that was formed after Indian National Congress won 178 seats in 224 seat Assembly of Karnataka in 1989 elections.

In the government headed by Veerendra Patil, the Chief Minister was from INC. Apart from the CM, there were other ministers in the government.

== Tenure of the Government ==
In 1989, Indian National Congress emerged victorious and Veerendra Patil was elected as leader of the Party, hence sworn in as CM in 1989. A year later he submitted resignation and President's Rule was imposed and S. Bangarappa sworn in as Chief Minister later.

== Council of Ministers ==
Sr. No.	Name	MLA/MLC	Constituency	Designation	Portfolio(s)	Party	Term of Office	
Sr. No.	Name	MLA/MLC	Constituency	Designation	Portfolio(s)	Party	Took Office	Left Office
Chief Minister
1.	Veerendra Patil	MLA	Chincholi	Chief Minister	Other departments not allocated to a Minister.	Indian National Congress	30 November 1989	10 October 1990
Cabinet Ministers
2.	M. Rajasekara Murthy	MLA	Chamundeshwari	Cabinet Minister	Finance; Excise	Indian National Congress	30 November 1989	10 October 1990
3.	M. Veerappa Moily	MLA	Karkala	Cabinet Minister	Law	Indian National Congress	30 November 1989	10 October 1990
4.	Sarekoppa Bangarappa	MLA	Sorab	Cabinet Minister	Agriculture; Horticulture	Indian National Congress	30 November 1989	10 October 1990
5.	M. Y. Ghorpade	MLA	Sandur	Cabinet Minister	Rural Development; Panchayati Raj	Indian National Congress	3 May 1990	10 October 1990
6.	K. H. Patil	MLA	Gadag	Cabinet Minister	Revenue; Labour	Indian National Congress	3 May 1990	10 October 1990
7.	K. J. George	MLA	Bharathinagar	Minister of State (I/C)	Transport; Food and Civil Supplies	Indian National Congress	30 November 1989	10 October 1990

=== Chief Whip of Ruling Party ===
C. S. Nadagouda

== See also ==
- Karnataka Legislative Assembly
