= DMK-led alliance =

Indian political alliance

- திமுக தலைமையிலான கூட்டணி DMK-led alliance
- Abbreviation: DMK+/SPA
- Chairperson: M. K. Stalin (Tamil Nadu); (Puducherry)
- Founder: C. N. Annadurai; M. Karunanidhi; M. K. Stalin
- Founded: (DMK+) 1967; (DPA) 20 January 2004; (SPA) 1 March 2019
- Ideology: Big tent Factions: Dravidianism; Tamil nationalism Social democracy Secularism
- Political position: Centre-left
- ECI status: Not required
- Seats in Rajya Sabha: 10 / 19
- Seats in Lok Sabha: 22 / 40
- Seats in State Legislative Assemblies: 60 / 234 (Tamil Nadu Legislative Assembly) 5 / 33 (Puducherry Legislative Assembly)
- Number of states and union territories in government: 0 / 31

The DMK-led alliance (abbr. DMK+), also known as Secular Progressive Alliance, is an Indian regional political party alliance in the state of Tamil Nadu and the union territory of Puducherry led by the Dravida Munnetra Kazhagam (DMK). It was founded by the former chief minister of Tamil Nadu C. N. Annadurai in 1967.

== History ==
Naming History
Name	Period	Notes
DMK-led Alliance (DMK+)	1957–2004	
Democratic Progressive Alliance (DPA)	2004–2019	
Secular Progressive Alliance (SPA)	2019–present	

== Current members ==
#	Party	Abbr.	Flag	Symbol	Leader
1	Dravida Munnetra Kazhagam	DMK			M. K. Stalin
2	Desiya Murpokku Dravida Kazhagam	DMDK			Premalatha Vijayakant
3	Kongunadu Makkal Desia Katchi	KMDK			E. R. Eswaran
4	Makkal Needhi Maiam	MNM			Kamal Haasan
5	Manithaneya Makkal Katchi	MNMK			M. H. Jawahirullah
6	Social Democratic Party of India	SDPI			V. M. S. Mohamed Mubarak
7	Manithaneya Jananayaga Katchi	MJK			M. Thamimun Ansari
9	Tamil Nadu Peasants and Workers Party	TNPWP			Pon. Kumar
10	Tamil Nadu Kongu Ilaingar Peravai	TNKIP			U. Thaniyarasu
11	Tamizhar Desam Katchi	TDK			K. K. Selvakumar
12	Adhi Tamilar Peravai	ATP			R. Adhiyaman
13	Mukkulathor Pulipadai	MKLP			Karunas
14	Makkal Viduthalai Katchi	MVK			K. Murugavelrajan
15	Dravida Vettri Kazhagam	DVK			C. E. Sathya
16	Samathuva Makkal Kazhagam	SMK			Ernavoor Narayanan
17	Jananayaga Muslim Makkal Party	JMMK			Dr.M.F. Tamim

== Indian general elections ==
=== Tamil Nadu ===
Lok Sabha elections in Tamil Nadu
Duration	Election year	Allied parties	Seats won
1989	1989 Indian general election	DMK, CPI, CPI(M) and JD	1 / 39
1991	1991 Indian general election	DMK, CPI, CPI(M) and JD	0 / 39
United Front
1996	1996 Indian general election	TMC(M), DMK and CPI	39 / 39
1998	1998 Indian general election	TMC(M), DMK and CPI	9 / 39
National Democratic Alliance
1999	1999 Indian general election	DMK , PMK, BJP, MDMK, MADMK, MGRK and TRC	26 / 39
United Progressive Alliance
2004	2004	DMK, INC, CPI(M), CPI, PMK, MDMK, IUML, CJP	39 / 39
United Progressive Alliance
2004–2013	2009	DMK, INC, VCK, IUML	27 / 39
Democratic Progressive Alliance
2013–2016	2014 Indian general election in Tamil Nadu	DMK, VCK, MMK, PT, IUML	0 / 39
United Progressive Alliance
2016–2023	2019 Indian general election in Tamil Nadu	DMK, VCK, CPI(M), CPI, MDMK, KMDK, IUML, IJK	38 / 39
Indian National Developmental Inclusive Alliance
2023–2026	2024 Indian general election in Tamil Nadu	DMK, INC, VCK, CPI(M), CPI, MDMK, KMDK, MNM, IUML	39 / 39

=== Puducherry ===
Lok Sabha elections in Puducherry
Duration	Election year	Allied parties	Contested by	Result	style="text-align:center;"	DMK – Congress Alliance
1971	1971	DMK, INC, CPI and IUML	INC	Won		
DMK – Congress(O) Alliance
1977	1977	DMK, INC(O), CPI(M)	INC	Lost		
DMK – Congress Alliance
1980	1980	DMK, INC(O), CPI(M)	INC	Won		
DMK – Janata Party Alliance
1984	1984	DMK, JP, CPI(M), CPI	DMK	Lost		
National Front
1989	1989	DMK, JP, CPI(M), CPI	DMK	Lost		
National Front
1991	1991	DMK, JP, CPI(M), CPI	DMK	Lost		
United Front
1996	1996	DMK, TMC(M), CPI	DMK	Lost		
United Front
1998	1998	DMK, TMC(M), CPI	DMK	Won		
National Democratic Alliance
1999	1999	DMK, BJP, PMK	PMK	Lost		
United Progressive Alliance
2004	2004	DMK, INC, PMK, IUML, CPI, CPI(M)	PMK	style="text-align:center;"	United Progressive Alliance	
2004–2013	2009	DMK, INC, VCK	INC	Won		
DMK-VCK Alliance
2013–2016	2014	DMK, VCK, MMK, PT	DMK	Lost		
United Progressive Alliance
2016–2023	2019	DMK, VCK, CPI(M), CPI	INC	Won		
Indian National Developmental Inclusive Alliance
2023–2026	2024	DMK, VCK, CPI(M), CPI, MNM	INC	Won		

=== State Legislative Assembly elections ===
==== Tamil Nadu ====
State Legislative Assembly Elections in Tamil Nadu
Duration	Election Year	Allied parties	Seats won
United Front
1967	1967 Indian general election	DMK, SP, CPI(M) and IUML, PSP, SSP, NTK, TAK and two Independents	179 / 234
Progressive Front
1971	1971 Tamil Nadu Legislative Assembly election	DMK, INC(R), CPI, IUML, PSP and AIFB	205 / 234
DMK+
1977	1977 Tamil Nadu Legislative Assembly election	DMK	48 / 234
DMK – Congress Alliance
1980	1980 Tamil Nadu Legislative Assembly election	DMK, INC, IUML and two Independents	69 / 234
DMK-led Alliance
1984	1984 Tamil Nadu Legislative Assembly election	DMK, JP, CPI (M) and CPI	34 / 234
1989	1989 Tamil Nadu Legislative Assembly election	DMK, CPI(M) and JD	150 / 234
1991	1991 Tamil Nadu Legislative Assembly election	DMK, CPI, TMK, CPI(M) and JD	7 / 234
United Front
1996	1996 Tamil Nadu Legislative Assembly election	DMK, TMC(M), AIFB, IUML and CPI	221 / 234
National Democratic Alliance
2001	2001 Tamil Nadu Legislative Assembly election	DMK, BJP, PT, MDK, PNK, MADMK, MGRK, IUUK, TCP, TBK, VCK, CJP, TMIJ, TPMK, TNMS and KMK	37 / 234
Democratic Progressive Alliance
2006	2006 Tamil Nadu Legislative Assembly election	DMK, INC, PMK, IUML, CPI(M), CPI, PBK and AIFB (Vallarasu)	163 / 234
Democratic Progressive Alliance
ஜனநாயக முற்போக்குக் கூட்டணி
2004–2006	2006	DMK, INC, PMK, CPI(M), CPI, PBK, IUML, FB (Vallarasu)	163 / 234
2006–2011	2011	DMK, INC, PMK, VCK, KMK, MMK, PMK, IUML	31 / 234
2011–2016	2016	DMK, INC, VCK, MMK, PT, PMK, TPWP, IUML, SSP	98 / 234
Secular Progressive Alliance
2017–2021	2021	DMK, INC, VCK, CPI, CPI(M), MMK, MDMK, PMK, KMDK, AIFB, IUML, MVK, ATP	159 / 234
2026	2026	DMK, INC, DMDK, VCK, CPI, CPI(M), IUML, MNM,MMK,KMDK,SDPI	73 / 234

=== Puducherry ===
State Legislative Assembly elections in Puducherry
Duration	Election Year	Allied parties	Seats won
DMK-CPI Alliance
1969	1969 Pondicherry Legislative Assembly election	DMK, CPI and two Independents	20 / 30
DMK+
1974	1974 Pondicherry Legislative Assembly election	DMK	2 / 30
1977	1977 Pondicherry Legislative Assembly election	DMK	3 / 30
DMK-Congress (Indira) Alliance
1980	1980 Pondicherry Legislative Assembly election	DMK, Indian National Congress(Indira) and two Independents	26 / 30
DMK-Janata Party Alliance
1985	1985 Pondicherry Legislative Assembly election	DMK and JP	7 / 30
DMK-led Alliance
1990	1990 Pondicherry Legislative Assembly election	DMK, CPI, JD and an independent	16 / 30
1991	1991 Pondicherry Legislative Assembly election	DMK, CPI, JD and two Independents	9 / 30
1996	1996 Pondicherry Legislative Assembly election	DMK, TMC(M), CPI, JD and two Independents	17 / 30
National Democratic Alliance
2001	2001 Pondicherry Legislative Assembly election	DMK, BJP, PMC	12 / 30
United Progressive Alliance
2004–2021	2006	DMK, INC, PMK, CPI	20 / 30
2004–2021	2011	DMK, INC, PMK, VCK	9 / 30
2004–2021	2016	INC, DMK	18 / 30
2004–2021	2021	INC, DMK, VCK, CPI, Independent	9 / 30
Secular Progressive Alliance
2025–2026	2026	DMK	5 / 30

== Strength in Legislative Assembly ==
=== Tamil Nadu ===
Party	Abbr.	Ideology	Seats	Remarks
Dravida Munnetra Kazhagam	DMK	Dravidianism	59 / 234	
Desiya Murpokku Dravida Kazhagam	DMDK	Dravidianism	1 / 234	

=== Puducherry ===
Party	Abbr.	Ideology	Seats
Dravida Munnetra Kazhagam	DMK	Dravidianism	5 / 30

== Strength in Lok Sabha ==
=== Tamil Nadu ===
Party	Abbr.	Ideology	Seats
Dravida Munnetra Kazhagam	DMK	Dravidianism	22 / 39

== Withdrawals ==
Political party	State	Date	Reason for withdrawal
Tamizhaga Makkal Munnetra Kazhagam	Tamil Nadu	2009	Allied with BSP
Puratchi Bharatham Katchi	Tamil Nadu	2011	Allied with AIADMK+
Pattali Makkal Katchi	Tamil Nadu	2014	Allied with NDA
Kongunadu Munnetra Kazhagam	Tamil Nadu	2019	Allied with AIADMK+
Puthiya Tamilagam	Tamil Nadu	2019	Allied with AIADMK+
Perunthalaivar Makkal Katchi	Tamil Nadu	2019	Allied with AIADMK+
Indian Uzhavar Uzhaippalar Katchi	Tamil Nadu	2021	Allied with AIADMK+
Indhiya Jananayaga Katchi	Tamil Nadu	2021	Allied with MNM-led Alliance
Tamizhaga Vazhvurimai Katchi	Tamil Nadu	2026	Withdrew its support
Moovendar Munnetra Kazhagam	Tamil Nadu	2026	Allied with AIADMK+
Indian National Congress	Tamil Nadu	2026	Allied with SSJVA
Indian Union Muslim League	Tamil Nadu	2026	Allied with SSJVA
Viduthalai Chiruthaigal Katchi	Tamil Nadu	2026	Allied with SSJVA
Communist Party of India	Tamil Nadu	2026	Formed LF
Communist Party of India (Marxist)	Tamil Nadu	2026	Formed LF
Marumalarchi Dravida Munnetra Kazhagam	Tamil Nadu	2026	Alied with SSJVA

The Left parties defected to the All India Anna Dravida Munnetra Kazhagam (AIADMK)-led front in 2009 after it withdrew support to the Indian National Congress-led United Progressive Alliance coalition in the centre.

The Pattali Makkal Katchi withdrew support in 2008 over differences with the DMK but it still remained in the Congress-led UPA in the centre. But after differences over seat sharing before the 15th Lok Sabha, it withdrew support to the UPA also and crossed over to the AIADMK-led front.

The Manithaneya Makkal Katchi was formed in 2009 by the Tamil Nadu Muslim Munnetra Kazagham and immediately joined the DPA. However, before the Lok Sabha elections, its demand for two Lok Sabha seats and one Rajya Sabha seat was turned down by the DMK, which offered them a lone Lok Sabha seat. The MMK withdrew from the DPA, and is now tied up with small parties like actor Sarath Kumar-led Akila Indiya Samathuva Makkal Katchi, the Puthiya Tamilzhagam and the Bharatiya Janata Party (BJP).

Prior to the 2026 Tamil Nadu Legislative Assembly election, the Tamilaga Vazhvurimai Katchi and Moovendar Munnetra Kazhagam withdrew their support from the SPA alliance. Following the election, the Indian National Congress, which had won five seats as part of the SPA alliance, extended its support to Tamilaga Vettri Kazhagam. The Communist Party of India, Communist Party of India (Marxist), Viduthalai Chiruthaigal Katchi and Indian Union Muslim League also extended unconditional support to TVK to facilitate the formation of a government before the deadline (10 May) and avoid the imposition of President's rule, while continuing their alliance with the DMK-led SPA. Subsequently, the IUML and VCK joined the TVK-led coalition government, with their MLAs being sworn in as ministers. The parties also formally confirmed that they would continue as part of the SPA alliance. Communist Party of India (Marxist) later left the alliance when M. K. Stalin stirred up a controversy by commenting on the alliance partners support for the Tamilaga Vettri Kazhagam led Tamil Nadu Government, saying it was after its (Dravida Munnetra Kazhagam) approval, CPI(M) state secretary P Shanmugam denied it saying it was an independent decision and left the alliance .Communist Party of India and as well as Marumalarchi Dravida Munnetra Kazhagam too withdrew there support and left the alliance.

== Governments and legislative leaders ==
- Annadurai ministry (1967–1969)
- First Karunanidhi ministry (1969–1971)
- Second Karunanidhi ministry (1971–1976)
- Third Karunanidhi ministry (1989–1991)
- Fourth Karunanidhi ministry (1996–2001)
- Fifth Karunanidhi ministry (2006–2011)
- Narayanasamy ministry (2016–2021)
- M. K. Stalin ministry (2021–2026)

== See also ==
- AINRC-led Alliance
- National Democratic Alliance
- Secular Social Justice Victory Alliance
- Indian National Developmental Inclusive Alliance
