= Moovendar Munnetra Kazhagam =

- Leader: G.M. Sreedhar Vandaiyar
- Founder: G.M. Premkumar Vandaiyar
- Alliance: AIADMK-led Alliance (2006 - 2009) (2014 - 2016) (2021 - 2024) (2026-); Secular Progressive Alliance (2019 - 2021) (2024 - 26); All India Forward Bloc (2016); DMK-led Alliance (2009 - 2014)

Party flag
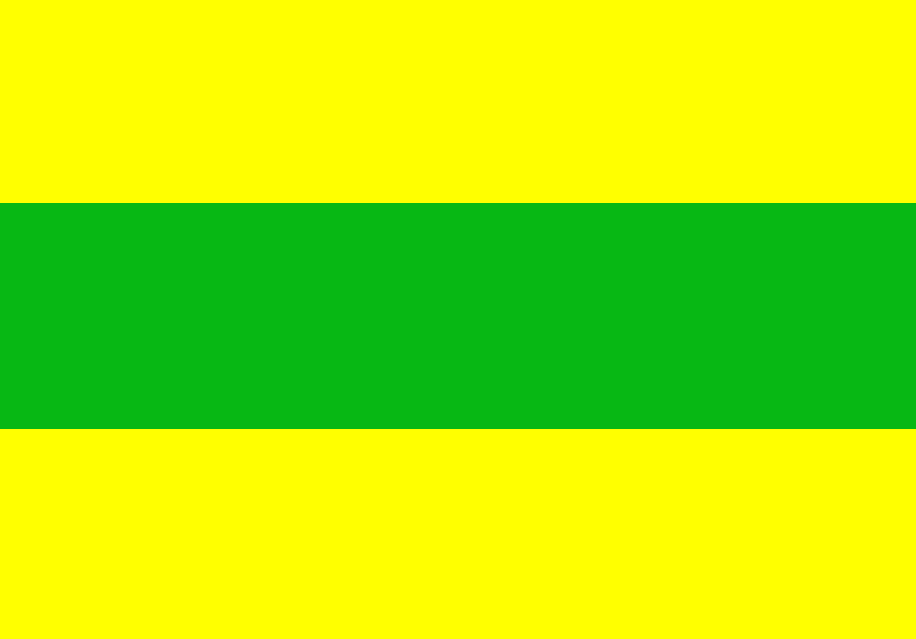

Moovendar Munnetra Kazhagam is a Tamil political party in India, based amongst the Thevar caste. The party was founded by G.M. Premkumar Vandaiyar and the present president is G.M. Sreedhar Vandaiyar.

== Performance ==
All India Anna Dravida Munnetra Kazhagam fielded Sreedhar Vandaiyar in the Thiruverumbur Lok Sabha constituency during 2006 and he lost by a small margin to K.N. Sekaran.

== 2009 and 2026 ==
Presently in 2011 MMK is in alliance with All India Anna Dravida Munnetra Kazhagam. In 2009 parliamentary election G.M. Sreedhar Vandaiyar made an alliance with DMK.
