= Perunthalaivar Makkal Katchi =

- Leader: N. R. Dhanapalan
- Founded: 2011
- Alliance: AIADMK-led Alliance (2019–present); SPA (2011–2019)
- Seats in Rajya Sabha: 0 / 245
- Seats in Lok Sabha: 0 / 543
- Seats in Tamil Nadu Legislative Assembly: 0 / 234
- Number of states and union territories in government: 0 / 31

Party flag
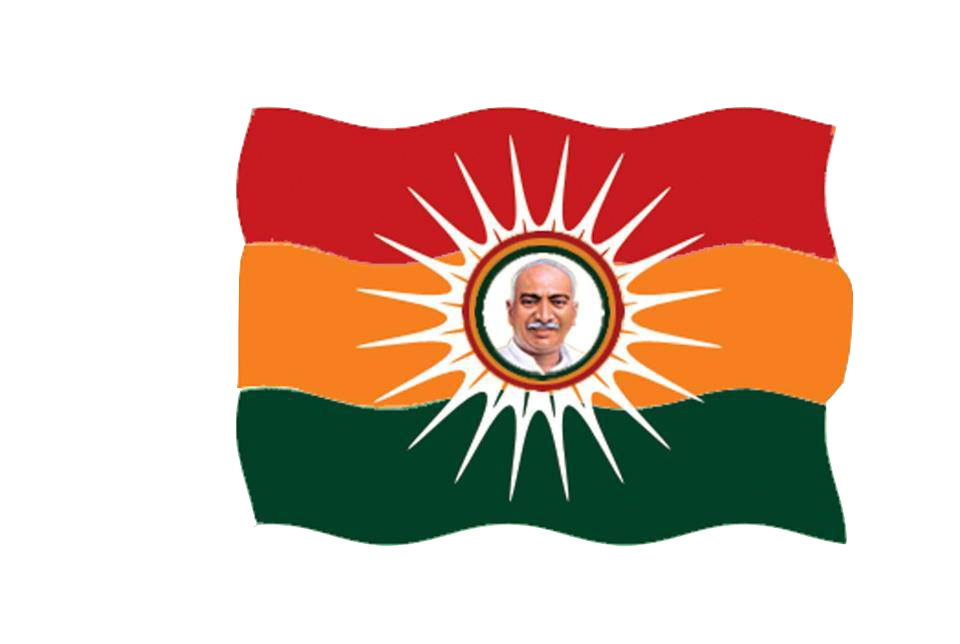

Website
- htthhb://www.ptmkparty.com

Perunthalaivar Makkal Katchi (PTMK) is a political party in the Indian state of Tamil Nadu.

== History ==
The party is floated as a forum by the Nadar community who are primarily found in southern-most districts of Tamil Nadu such as Thoothukudi, Tenkasi, Tirunelveli, and Kanniyakumari. Nadars, primarily Hindus and Christians, have traditionally supported the Congress Party, but in recent times have become a non-monolithic voting group, supporting caste-oriented parties, DMK/ADMK and the BJP in recent elections. The latter has seen an increasing number of Nadars joining the ranks, notably Tamilisai Soundararajan.

The party believes and focused to get high turnouts with its vote base mainly concentrated towards the Nadars in the southern region of Tamil Nadu.

== Election history ==
Year	General Election	Votes Polled	Seats Contested	Seats Won	Alliance with
2011	2011 Tamil Nadu Legislative Assembly election		1		DMK front

== Election Alliance ==
The ruling Dravida Munnetra Kazhagam (DMK) in Tamil Nadu on allotted one seat for them. Both parties signed an agreement in this regard at the DMK headquarters here after talks with DMK president and Chief Minister M. Karunanidhi. Mr. Dhanapalan is the party candidate contesting with the DMK symbol.
