= V. Sunil Kumar =

Indian politician

Minister of Energy Government of Karnataka
- In office 4 August 2021 – 13 May 2023
- Chief Minister: Basavaraj Bommai
- Preceded by: B. S. Yediyurappa

Minister of Kannada & Culture Government of Karnataka
- In office 4 August 2021 – 13 May 2023
- Chief Minister: Basavaraj Bommai
- Preceded by: Arvind Limbavali

Member of Karnataka Legislative Assembly
- Incumbent
- Assumed office 8 May 2013
- Preceded by: H. Gopal Bhandary
- Constituency: Karkala
- In office 2004–2008
- Preceded by: H. Gopal Bhandary
- Constituency: Karkala

Personal details
- Born: Vasudev Sunil Kumar; 15 August 1975 (age 51) Karkala Neklaje Guthu, Karnataka, India
- Party: Bharatiya Janata Party
- Spouse: Priyanka
- Children: 3
- Parent: Vasudev Pramoda

Vasudev Sunil Kumar (born 15 August 1975) is an Indian politician from Karnataka. He is the member of the legislative assembly from Bharatiya Janata Party representing Karkala Assembly constituency. He served as Chief Whip of BJP Government in Karnataka Legislative Assembly. In November 2020, he was appointed the co-incharge of BJP in Kerala.

== Political career ==
Sunil Kumar started his political career as a leader of the student wing of the RSS, the Akhil Bharatiya Vidyarthi Parishad. Later he joined Bharatiya Janata Party in the year 2004.

In the 2004 Karnataka Legislative Assembly election he contested against the incumbent member H. Gopal Bhandary of Indian National Congress and he was elected to Karnataka Legislative Assembly from Karkala constituency for the first time. He defeated Congress candidate by a margin of over 10000 votes. Kumar lost the seat to H. Gopal Bhandary in the 2008 Karnataka Legislative Assembly election by a narrow margin of 1537 votes. Kumar later contested Udupi-Chikmagalur Loksabha by-election in 2012. The seat was vacated after D. V. Sadananda Gowda became Chief Minister of Karnataka. He lost by huge margin against K. Jayaprakash Hegde of Congress. Kumar was elected as MLA from Karkala Constituency in 2013 Karnataka Legislative Assembly election by defeating H. Gopal Bhandary by over 4000 votes. Currently he is serving as the chief Whip of ruling party in Karnataka government.

He was re-elected as the MLA from Karkala Constituency by defeating H. Gopal Bhandary for the 3rd time with a margin of 42566 votes on 15 May 2018. In November 2020, he was appointed Co-incharge of BJP Kerala by party president Jagat Prakash Nadda.

When BJP formed government under B.S.Yediyurappa in 2019, it was highly expected that Sunil Kumar will be made cabinet minister but his name was missing. His name was again ignored during cabinet expansion in January 2021. Sunil Kumar wrote a letter to State BJP Party president Nalin Kumar Kateel expressing displeasure.

He was later sworn in as a cabinet minister, under Basavaraj Bommai in August 2021. He was given the energy ministry and the ministry for Kannada and culture.

He was re-elected as the MLA from Karkala for the fourth time in May 2023, defeating Uday Shetty of the Indian National Congress (INC) with a lead of 4,602 votes.

== Personal life ==
Sunil Kumar married Priyanka and they have 3 children.
