= H. Gopal Bhandary =

Indian politician (1952–2019)

Member of the Karnataka Legislative Assembly
- In office 1999–2004
- Preceded by: K P Shenoy
- Succeeded by: V. Sunil Kumar
- Constituency: Karkala

Member of the Karnataka Legislative Assembly
- In office 2008–2013
- Preceded by: V. Sunil Kumar
- Succeeded by: V. Sunil Kumar

Personal details
- Born: 7 July 1952; Hebri, India
- Died: 4 July 2019 (aged 66); Bejai Mangaluru, India
- Political party: Indian National Congress

Hutturke Gopal Bhandary (7 July 1952 – 4 July 2019) was an Indian politician from the State of Karnataka and a member of Legislative Assembly of Karnataka. He was elected as MLA from Karkala constituency and served in 1999-2004 and 2008–2013.

== Political career ==
H. Gopal Bhandary won the Karkala assembly seat by 1537 votes when the elections for Karnataka state assembly were last held in 2008. He was defeated by V. Sunil Kumar of BJP in 2013 by a margin of 4254 votes. H. Gopal Bhandary first became the Member of Karnataka Legislative Assembly (MLA) in 1999. He defeated K P Shenoy of BJP. Gopal Bhandary polled 49591 votes, 62.68% of the total votes polled. He contested 2004 elections but lost to V.Sunil Kumar of BJP. However H. Gopal Bhandary emerged victorious again in 2008.

== Death ==
H. Gopal Bhandary died due to heart attack on 4 July 2019 while he was travelling from Bengaluru to Mangaluru on a Volvo Bus. His cremation took place at Hutturke, Hebri, in Udupi district.
