= Tamil Nadu Peasants and Workers Party =

- Leader: Pon Kumar
- Headquarters: No 4, Nerkundram Pathai, Vadapalani Chennai – 600018

Tamil Nadu Peasants and Workers Party (Tamil: தமிழ்நாடு விவசாயிகள் தொழிலாளர் கட்சி, TNPWP) is a political party in the Indian state of Tamil Nadu. The president of TNPWP is Pon Kumar. TNPWP supported the All India Anna Dravida Munnetra Kazhagam (AIADMK) for 22 years, but the alliance broke down ahead of the 2006 Tamil Nadu assembly election. Instead the TNPWP aligned itself with the Samajwadi Party. Since the 2006 elections, TNPWP has supported the Dravida Munnetra Kazhagam (DMK)-led Democratic Progressive Alliance government.

The flag of TNPWP is green-yellow-red.
