= Dravidian nationalism =

Indian political ideology

Dravidian nationalism, or Dravidianism, developed in Madras Presidency which comprises the four major ethno-linguistic groups in South India. This idea was popularized during the 1930s to 1950s by a series of small movements and organizations that contended that the South Indians (Dravidian people) formed a racial and a cultural entity that was different from the North Indians. Dravidianists have claimed that the Brahmins and other upper castes were originally Aryan migrants from outside of India, and that they imposed their language, Sanskrit, religion and heritage on the Dravidian people. The claim was based on a hypothesis floated first during colonial times, popularized by Max Mueller, which is now described a myth by most present-day historians, based on modern DNA evidence studies.

== History ==
The early Dravidian movement led by E. V. Ramasami Periyar demanded an independent Dravidian State, which included all four Dravidian speaking states of South India. The movement failed to find support among other Dravidian people and had to be limited to Tamil Nadu. A new morphed ideology of Dravidian nationalism gained momentum within Tamil Nadu during the 1930s and 1950s.

Dravidian Nationalism was thus based on three ideologies: dismantling of Brahmin hegemony; revitalization of the Dravidian languages (that include Telugu, Kannada, Malayalam and Tamil) and social reform by abolition of existing caste systems, religious practices and recasting women's equal position in society.

By the late 1960s, the political parties who were espousing Dravidian ideology gained power within the state of Tamil Nadu. The Sixteenth Amendment of the Indian Constitution (popularly known as the Anti-Secessionist Amendment) banned any party with sectarian principles from participating in elections. Faced with the new constitutional changes, Dravidian ideologues left the call for an independent Tamil homeland on the back burner. Subsequently, they aimed at achieving better co-operation between the states and claimed more autonomy for Tamil Nadu.

== Political parties ==
Since the 1969 election victory of Dravida Munnetra Kazhagam (DMK) under C. N. Annadurai, Dravidian nationalism has been a permanent feature of the government of Tamil Nadu. After the Dravidian people achieved self-determination, the claim for secession became weaker with most mainstream political parties, except a fringe few, are committed to development of Tamil Nadu within a united India. Most major Tamil Nadu regional parties such as DMK, All India Anna Dravida Munnetra Kazhagam (AIADMK) and Marumalarchi Dravida Munnetra Kazhagam (MDMK) frequently participate as coalition partners of other pan-Indian parties in the Union Government of India at New Delhi. The inability of the national parties of India to comprehend and capitalize on Dravidian nationalism is one of the main reasons for the lack of presence in modern Tamil Nadu. Modern-day Dravidian nationalism has actually contributed to a more flaccid celebration of Dravidian identity and the ‘uplift’ of the poor.
