= 1977 Indian presidential election =

Election of Neelam Sanjiva Reddy

- 6 August 1977
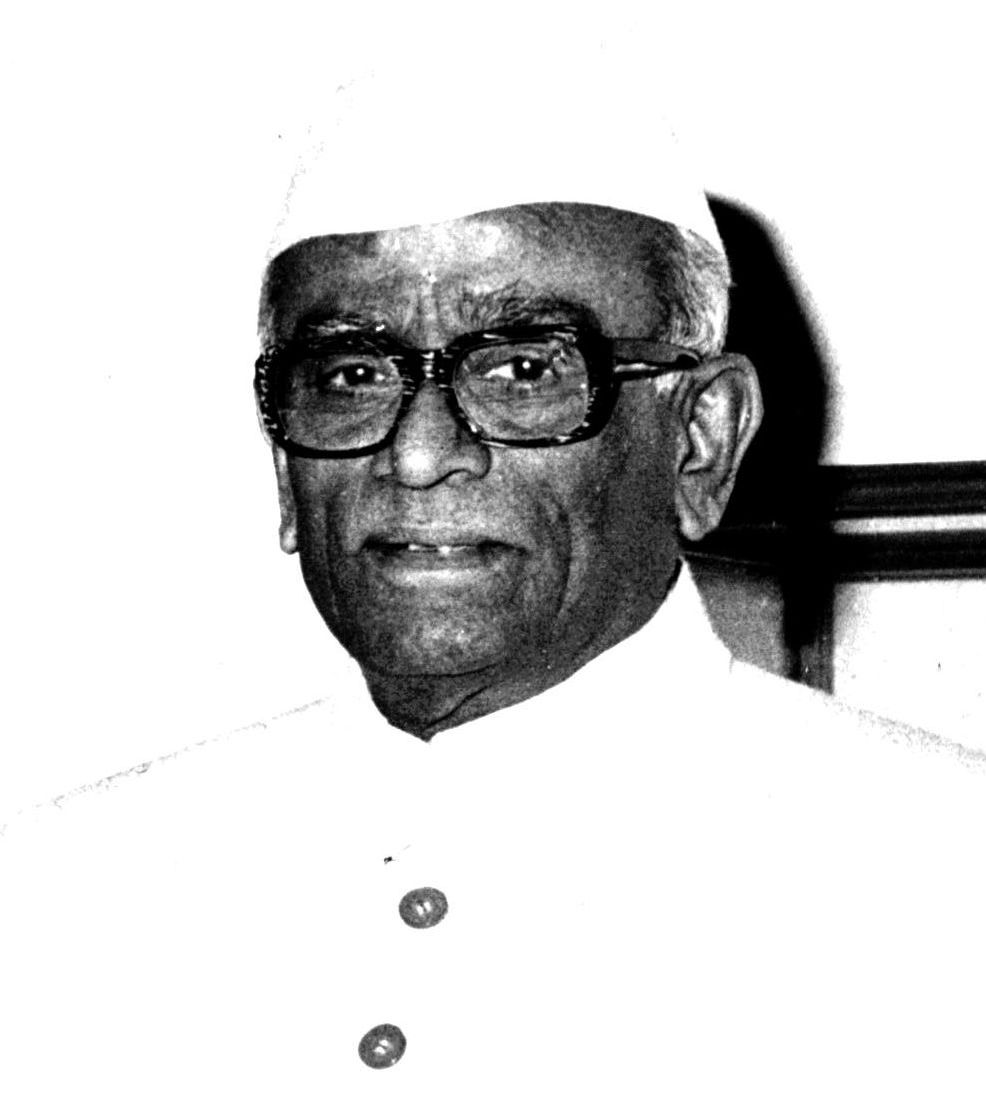
Nominee	Neelam Sanjiva Reddy
Party	JP
Home state	Andhra Pradesh
Electoral vote	Unopposed
President before election
Fakhruddin Ali Ahmed
INC
Elected President
Neelam Sanjiva Reddy
JP

The Election Commission of India held indirect seventh presidential elections of India on 6 August 1977. Even though 37 candidates filed their nominations, 36 of them were rejected, leading to Neelam Sanjiva Reddy being one of the two Presidents of India winning unopposed.

== Background ==
After the death of the sitting president, Fakhruddin Ali Ahmed, on 11 February 1977, the vice-president B. D. Jatti took charge as acting President. An election to the office of President was required to be held within 6 months of the date of the vacancy.

The Electoral College consisted of the members of Lok Sabha (524), Rajya Sabha (232) and 22 state Legislative Assemblies (3776), all together totalling 4532 electors.

== Schedule ==
The election schedule was announced by the Election Commission of India on 4 July 1977.

S.No.	Poll Event	Date
1.	Last Date for filing nomination	18 July 1977
2.	Date for Scrutiny of nomination	19 July 1977
3.	Last Date for Withdrawal of nomination	21 July 1977
4.	Date of Poll	6 August 1977
5.	Date of Counting	NA

== See also ==
- 1979 Indian vice presidential election
