= 1979 Indian vice presidential election =

Vice-presidential election in India

- 27 August 1979
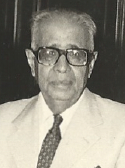
Nominee	Mohammad Hidayatullah
Party	Independent
Home state	Uttar Pradesh
Electoral vote	Unopposed
Vice President before election
Basappa Danappa Jatti
INC(R)
Elected Vice President
Mohammad Hidayatullah
Independent

The 1979 Indian vice presidential election was held in mid-1979 to elect the vice president of India. Former chief justice Mohammad Hidayatullah was elected unopposed for the post. Had the election been contested by more than one candidate, it would have occurred on 27 August 1979.

== Schedule ==
The election schedule was announced by the Election Commission of India on 23 July 1979.

S.No.	Poll Event	Date
1.	Last Date for filing nomination	6 August 1979
2.	Date for Scrutiny of nomination	7 August 1979
3.	Last Date for Withdrawal of nomination	9 August 1979
4.	Date of Poll	27 September 1979
5.	Date of Counting	NA

== Result ==
Mohammad Hidayatullah was declared elected unopposed to the office of the Vice-President on 9 August 1979. He was sworn in to the office on 31 August 1979.

== See also ==
- 1977 Indian presidential election
