= Sidlaghatta Assembly constituency =

Legislative Assembly constituency in Karnataka, India

Coordinates: 13.39°N 77.87°E

Sidlaghatta
- Constituency No. 142 for the Karnataka Legislative Assembly

Constituency details
- Country: India
- Region: South India
- State: Karnataka
- District: Chikballapur
- Lok Sabha constituency: Kolar
- Established: 1956
- Total electors: 209,846
- Reservation: None

Member of Legislative Assembly
- 16th Karnataka Legislative Assembly
- Incumbent B. N. Ravi Kumar
- Party: JD(S)
- Alliance: NDA
- Elected year: 2023
- Preceded by: V. Muniyappa

Sidlaghatta Assembly constituency is one of the 224 constituencies in the Karnataka Legislative Assembly of Karnataka, a southern state of India. It is also part of Kolar Lok Sabha constituency.

== Members of the Legislative Assembly ==
Election	Member	Party
1957	J. Venkatappa	Independent politician
1962	S. Avala Reddy	Indian National Congress
1967	B. Venkatarayappa	Indian National Congress
1972	J. Venkatappa	Indian National Congress
1978	S. Munishainappa	Indian National Congress
1983	V. Muniyappa	Indian National Congress
1985	S. Munishainappa	Janata Party
1989	V. Muniyappa	Indian National Congress
1994	V. Muniyappa	Indian National Congress
1999	B. Muniyappa	Indian National Congress
2004	S. Munishainappa	Janata Dal
2008	V. Muniyappa	Indian National Congress
2013	M. Rajanna	Janata Dal
2018	V. Muniyappa	Indian National Congress
2023	B. N. Ravi Kumar	Janata Dal

== Election results ==
=== Assembly Election 2023 ===
2023 Karnataka Legislative Assembly election : Sidlaghatta
Party	Candidate	Votes	%	±%
JD(S)	B. N. Ravi Kumar	68,932	38.89%	▼0.17
Independent	Puttu Anjinappa	52,160	29.43%	New
INC	B. V. Rajeev Gowda	36,157	20.40%	▼24.36
BJP	Seekal Ramachandra Gowda	15,446	8.71%	▲6.60
AAP	B. S. Moula Jaan	1,387	0.78%	New
NOTA	None of the above	520	0.29%	▼0.27
Margin of victory		16,772	9.46%	▲3.76
Turnout		177,856	87.37%	▲1.44
Total valid votes		177,260		
Registered electors		203,564		▲2.70
JD(S) gain from INC		Swing	▼5.87	

=== Assembly Election 2018 ===
2018 Karnataka Legislative Assembly election : Sidlaghatta
Party	Candidate	Votes	%	±%
INC	V. Muniyappa	76,240	44.76%	▲5.26
JD(S)	B. N. Ravikumar	66,531	39.06%	▼10.23
Independent	Puttu Anjinappa	10,986	6.45%	New
Independent	M. Rajanna	8,593	5.05%	New
BJP	Suresh. H	3,596	2.11%	▲0.90
ANC	B. S. Moula Jaan	1,081	0.63%	New
NOTA	None of the above	958	0.56%	New
Margin of victory		9,709	5.70%	▼4.09
Turnout		170,325	85.93%	▼1.10
Total valid votes		170,322		
Registered electors		198,207		▲12.07
INC gain from JD(S)		Swing	▼4.53	

=== Assembly Election 2013 ===
2013 Karnataka Legislative Assembly election : Sidlaghatta
Party	Candidate	Votes	%	±%
JD(S)	M. Rajanna	77,931	49.29%	▲4.27
INC	V. Muniyappa	62,452	39.50%	▼10.45
KJP	D. R. Shivakumar Gowda	5,838	3.69%	New
Independent	Rajanna. G. A	2,097	1.33%	New
BJP	J. V. Sadashiva	1,914	1.21%	▼0.84
Margin of victory		15,479	9.79%	▲4.87
Turnout		153,915	87.03%	▲4.60
Total valid votes		158,113		
Registered electors		176,860		▲10.33
JD(S) gain from INC		Swing	▼0.66	

=== Assembly Election 2008 ===
2008 Karnataka Legislative Assembly election : Sidlaghatta
Party	Candidate	Votes	%	±%
INC	V. Muniyappa	65,939	49.95%	▲6.25
JD(S)	M. Rajanna	59,437	45.02%	▼4.83
BJP	Swethaja Lokesh	2,713	2.05%	▼1.07
BSP	G. Rajendra	1,135	0.86%	New
Independent	R. Subbareddy	1,023	0.77%	New
Margin of victory		6,502	4.92%	▼1.23
Turnout		132,148	82.43%	▲1.71
Total valid votes		132,022		
Registered electors		160,306		▲6.81
INC gain from JD(S)		Swing	▲0.10	

=== Assembly Election 2004 ===
2004 Karnataka Legislative Assembly election : Sidlaghatta
Party	Candidate	Votes	%	±%
JD(S)	S. Munishainappa	60,322	49.85%	New
INC	V. Muniyappa	52,875	43.70%	▼10.94
BJP	Mir Bahaddur Hussain	3,781	3.12%	New
JP	G. Rajendra	2,555	2.11%	New
RPI(A)	Sreeramanna. R	1,463	1.21%	New
Margin of victory		7,447	6.15%	▼5.10
Turnout		121,145	80.72%	▼0.56
Total valid votes		120,996		
Registered electors		150,089		▲7.40
JD(S) gain from INC		Swing	▼4.79	

=== Assembly Election 1999 ===
1999 Karnataka Legislative Assembly election : Sidlaghatta
Party	Candidate	Votes	%	±%
INC	B. Muniyappa	60,514	54.64%	▲11.43
JD(U)	S. Munishainappa	48,049	43.38%	New
CPI(M)	K. M. Venkatesh	2,188	1.98%	New
Margin of victory		12,465	11.25%	▲4.64
Turnout		113,584	81.28%	▼0.58
Total valid votes		110,751		
Rejected ballots		2,763	2.43%	▲0.79
Registered electors		139,742		▲6.36
INC hold		Swing	▲11.43	

=== Assembly Election 1994 ===
1994 Karnataka Legislative Assembly election : Sidlaghatta
Party	Candidate	Votes	%	±%
INC	V. Muniyappa	45,679	43.21%	▼13.26
JD	S. Munishainappa	38,692	36.60%	▲6.91
BJP	P. Veerappa	18,441	17.44%	New
INC	Matama Reddy. D. L	2,159	2.04%	New
Margin of victory		6,987	6.61%	▼20.17
Turnout		107,554	81.86%	▼1.62
Total valid votes		105,711		
Rejected ballots		1,761	1.64%	▼1.15
Registered electors		131,383		▲13.89
INC hold		Swing	▼13.26	

=== Assembly Election 1989 ===
1989 Karnataka Legislative Assembly election : Sidlaghatta
Party	Candidate	Votes	%	±%
INC	V. Muniyappa	52,870	56.47%	▲13.64
JD	S. Munishainappa	27,798	29.69%	New
JP	P. Veerappa	12,664	13.53%	New
Margin of victory		25,072	26.78%	▲13.93
Turnout		96,301	83.48%	▲2.37
Total valid votes		93,618		
Rejected ballots		2,683	2.79%	▲1.49
Registered electors		115,364		▲16.36
INC gain from JP		Swing	▲0.79	

=== Assembly Election 1985 ===
1985 Karnataka Legislative Assembly election : Sidlaghatta
Party	Candidate	Votes	%	±%
JP	S. Munishainappa	44,199	55.68%	New
INC	V. Muniyappa	33,998	42.83%	▼8.71
BJP	B. Munivenkatappa	689	0.87%	New
Margin of victory		10,201	12.85%	▲9.12
Turnout		80,419	81.11%	▲3.35
Total valid votes		79,375		
Rejected ballots		1,044	1.30%	▼0.42
Registered electors		99,147		▲12.37
JP gain from INC		Swing	▲4.14	

=== Assembly Election 1983 ===
1983 Karnataka Legislative Assembly election : Sidlaghatta
Party	Candidate	Votes	%	±%
INC	V. Muniyappa	34,757	51.54%	▲50.89
Independent	S. Munishainappa	32,244	47.82%	New
Margin of victory		2,513	3.73%	▼7.80
Turnout		68,610	77.76%	▼6.28
Total valid votes		67,432		
Rejected ballots		1,178	1.72%	▼0.45
Registered electors		88,234		▲10.37
INC gain from INC(I)		Swing	▼1.23	

=== Assembly Election 1978 ===
1978 Karnataka Legislative Assembly election : Sidlaghatta
Party	Candidate	Votes	%	±%
INC(I)	S. Munishainappa	34,683	52.77%	New
JP	E. Venkmatarayappa	27,106	41.24%	New
CPI(M)	G. Papanna	3,205	4.88%	▼1.53
INC	Narayanappa	424	0.65%	▼60.16
Margin of victory		7,577	11.53%	▼16.51
Turnout		67,184	84.04%	▲6.16
Total valid votes		65,727		
Rejected ballots		1,457	2.17%	▲2.17
Registered electors		79,941		▲18.22
INC(I) gain from INC		Swing	▼8.04	

=== Assembly Election 1972 ===
1972 Mysore State Legislative Assembly election : Sidlaghatta
Party	Candidate	Votes	%	±%
INC	J. Venkatappa	31,308	60.81%	▲6.49
Independent	B. Venkatarayappa	16,874	32.78%	New
CPI(M)	G. Papanna	3,299	6.41%	New
Margin of victory		14,434	28.04%	▲19.40
Turnout		52,661	77.88%	▲5.62
Total valid votes		51,481		
Registered electors		67,618		▲16.36
INC hold		Swing	▲6.49	

=== Assembly Election 1967 ===
1967 Mysore State Legislative Assembly election : Sidlaghatta
Party	Candidate	Votes	%	±%
INC	B. Venkatarayappa	21,908	54.32%	▼3.25
Independent	G. Papanna	18,422	45.68%	New
Margin of victory		3,486	8.64%	▼6.50
Turnout		41,988	72.26%	▲1.99
Total valid votes		40,330		
Registered electors		58,110		▲4.19
INC hold		Swing	▼3.25	

=== Assembly Election 1962 ===
1962 Mysore State Legislative Assembly election : Sidlaghatta
Party	Candidate	Votes	%	±%
INC	S. Avala Reddy	21,696	57.57%	▲16.42
Independent	J. Venkatappa	15,989	42.43%	New
Margin of victory		5,707	15.14%	▼2.56
Turnout		39,191	70.27%	▲9.27
Total valid votes		37,685		
Registered electors		55,772		▲14.47
INC gain from Independent		Swing	▼1.28	

=== Assembly Election 1957 ===
1957 Mysore State Legislative Assembly election : Sidlaghatta
Party	Candidate	Votes	%	±%
Independent	J. Venkatappa	17,490	58.85%	New
INC	S. Avala Reddy	12,230	41.15%	New
Margin of victory		5,260	17.70%	
Turnout		29,720	61.00%	
Total valid votes		29,720		
Registered electors		48,721		
Independent win (new seat)				

== See also ==
- Chikballapur district
- List of constituencies of Karnataka Legislative Assembly
