= Handiganala =

Village in Karnataka, India

Handiganala is a village in Shidlaghatta Taluk in Chikballapur District of Karnataka State, India It is located 15 km towards East from District headquarters Chikballapur 2 km from Sidlaghatta 62 km from State capital Bangalore Mallur ( 6 km ), Ablodu ( 7 km ), Devaramallur ( 8 km ), Bannikuppe ( 12 km ), Cheemangala ( 13 km ) are the nearby Villages to Handiganala.

Handiganala is surrounded by Vijayapura Taluk towards South, Chikballapur Taluk towards west, Devanhalli Taluk towards South, Chintamani Taluk towards East Sidlaghatta, Vijayapura, Chikkaballapur, Chintamani are the nearby Cities to Handiganala. This Place is in the border of the Chikballapur District and Bangalore Rural District, Bangalore Rural District Vijayapura is South towards this place

- Demographics of Handiganala Kannada is the Local Language here.
- Handiganala LocationTaluk Name : Sidlaghatta
- District : Chikballapur State : Karnataka
- Language : Kannada and English
- Time zone: IST (UTC+5:30)
- Elevation / Altitude: 904 meters. Above Sea level
- Telephone Code / Std Code: 08158

== How to Reach Handiganala ==
=== Train ===
Sidlaghatta Rail Way Station are the very nearby railway stations to Handiganala. Chintamani Rail Way Station (near to Chintamani), Chik Ballapur Rail Way Station (near to Chikkaballapur), Nandi Halt Rail Way Station (near to Chikkaballapur), Venkatagirikote Rail Way Station (near to Vijayapura) are the Rail way stations reachable from near by towns. However Bangalore Cy Jn Rail Way Station is amajor railway station 60 km from Handiganala

=== Road (Driving) ===
Vijayapura, Chikkaballapur, Chintamani, Bagepalli are the nearby by towns to Handiganala having road connectivity to Handiganala
Pincodes near Handiganala 562102 ( Melur (Kolar) ), 562105 ( Sidlaghatta ), 562101 ( Chickballapur )
Nearby Railway Stations
Sidlaghatta- 3 km  Chik Ballapur- 14 km
Venkatagiri Kote 14 km

== Places near Handiganala ==
- Nandi Hills- 20 km
- Bangalore- 59 km
- Lepakshi- 59 km
- Horsley Hills- 75 km
- Shivagange- 79 km
- Handiganala Nearby Places
- Few nearby places of Handiganala are listed below for your reference:
- Cities
- Sidlaghatta- 3 km
- Vijayapura- 12 km
- Chikkaballapur- 15 km
- Chintamani- 26 km
- Taluks
- Sidlaghatta- 3 km
- Chikballapur- 14 km
- Devanhalli- 22 km
- Chintamani- 26 km
- Airports
- Bengaluru International Airport- 27 km
- Mysore Airport- 197 km
- Tirupati Airport- 208 km
- Salem Airport- 219 km
- District Headquarters
- Chikballapur- 14 km
- Bangalore Rural- 26 km
- Kolar- 46 km
- Bangalore- 58 km
