= 1996 Indian general election in Pondicherry =

Indian general election in Pondicherry, 1996
- April–May 1996

1 (of 543) seat in the Lok Sabha
- Turnout: 477,437 (75.35%) (▲7.64%)
	First party	Second party
Leader	M. O. H. Farooq	S. Arumugham
Party	INC	DMK
Leader's seat	Pondicherry (won)	Pondicherry (lost)
Seats won	1	0
Seat change	Steady	Steady
Popular vote	183,986	183,702
Percentage	39.97%	39.91%
Swing	▼13.10%	▲4.10%
Prime Minister before election
P. V. Narasimha Rao
INC
Prime Minister after election
Atal Bihari Vajpayee
BJP

The 1996 Indian general election was held in Pondicherry on to elect 1 member of the 11th Lok Sabha.

The contest was primarily between two alliances. The INC–AIADMK alliance fielded a joint candidate from the INC, the incumbent MP M. O. H. Farook.

The DMK–TMC(M) alliance fielded a joint candidate from the DMK.

Other parties that fielded candidates included PMK, BJP, MDMK, along with several other parties and independent candidates.

== Election schedule ==
Poll event	Phase
Poll event	I
Date of poll	27 April 1996
Date of counting of votes	8 May 1996
Declaration of result	11 May 1996

== Voter Turnout ==
In the 1996 Pondicherry Lok Sabha election, the total number of electors was 6,33,635. Out of these, 4,77,437 voters cast their votes, resulting in a poll percentage of 75.35%. The number of valid votes recorded was 4,60,322.

== Constituency Data - Summary ==
Category	Male	Female	Total
Nominated	28	1	29
Rejected	0	0	0
Withdrawn	8	0	8
Contested	20	1	21
Forfeited Deposit	18	1	19

== Parties and alliances ==
=== Indian National Congress ===
Indian National Congress

Party	Flag	Symbol	Leader	Seats contested
Indian National Congress			M. O. H. Farook	1

=== Dravida Munnetra Kazhagam ===
Dravida Munnetra Kazhagam

Party	Symbol	Leader	Seats contested
Dravida Munnetra Kazhagam		S. Arumugham	1

=== Others ===
Party	Flag	Symbol	Leader	Seats contested
Bharatiya Janata Party			S. Thiyagarajan	1
Pattali Makkal Katchi			Bavany Madura Cavy	1
Marumalarchi Dravida; Munnetra Kazhagam			R. Balasubramani	1

== Results by Party ==
Party Name	Popular vote			Seats		
Party Name	Votes	%	±pp	Contested	Won	+/−
INC	1,83,986	39.97		1	1	
DMK	1,83,702	39.91		1	0	
BJP	20,351	4.42		1	0	
PMK	19,792	4.30		1	0	
MDMK	13,397	2.91		1	0	
BSP	4,005	0.87		1	0	
IC(S)	3,819	0.83		1	0	
JP	1,823	0.40		1	0	
IND	29,447	6.40		13	0	Steady
Total	4,60,322	100%	-	21	1	-

== Detailed Result ==
In the Pondicherry Lok Sabha constituency, M. O. H. Farook of the Indian National Congress (INC) won the election by a narrow margin, securing 1,83,986 votes (39.97%). He defeated S. Arumugham of the Dravida Munnetra Kazhagam (DMK), who polled 1,83,702 votes (39.91%).

Constituency		Winner				Runner-up				Margin	
Constituency		Candidate	Party	Votes	%	Candidate	Party	Votes	%	Votes	%
1	Pondicherry	M. O. H. Farook	INC	183,986	39.97	S. Arumugham	DMK	183,702	39.91	284	0.06
