= V. Muniyappa =

Indian politician

V. Muniyappa at a public event

Vadigenahalli Munishamappa Muniyappa (born 20 April 1947) is an Indian politician from Karnataka. A member of the Indian National Congress, he has served multiple terms as a Member of the Legislative Assembly representing the Sidlaghatta constituency in Chikkaballapur district.

Muniyappa was elected to the Karnataka Legislative Assembly six times since 1983 and has contested the MLA elections from Sidlaghatta nine times. He contested the Lok Sabha election once, in 1996. He served as a cabinet minister in the governments of S. Bangarappa (1991), Veerappa Moily (1993), and S. M. Krishna (1999), holding portfolios including Sericulture, Energy, and Mines & Geology. In January 2019, he was appointed as the Political Secretary to Chief Minister H. D. Kumaraswamy.

== Early life ==
Vadigenahalli Munishamappa Muniyappa was born on 20 April 1947 in Handiganala village, Sidlaghatta taluk, originally part of Kolar district and now within Chikkaballapur district following the administrative reorganization in 2007.

He is the eldest son of V. Munishamappa, a former chairman of the local village Panchayat, and Smt. Pillamma.

He completed his early education at the Government School in Sidlaghatta and matriculated from a government school in Kolar. He later earned a Bachelor of Science (B.Sc.) degree from Chintamani Degree College.

Muniyappa married Smt. Ratnamma; they have two sons and one daughter.

== Political career ==
V. Muniyappa began his political career in the National Students' Union of India (NSUI) while at university. He was associated with the Taluk Agricultural Products Co-operative Marketing Society (TAPCMS) in 1967 and served as Director of PLD Bank for two terms. He was involved with the Indian Youth Congress from 1970 to 1971, and then vice-president of Karnataka Pradesh Congress Committee (KPCC) from 1975 to 1983.

In 1983, he was first elected as a Member of the Legislative Assembly (MLA) from Sidlaghatta. He was subsequently re-elected in 1989, 1994, and 1999. He served in the cabinets of S. Bangarappa (1991) as Minister of Sericulture, Veerappa Moily (1993) as Minister of Energy, and S. M. Krishna (1999-2004) as Minister for Mines and Geology.

From 2004 to 2008, he held positions in the KPCC and the All India Congress Committee (AICC). In 2008, he was again elected MLA. In 2013, he was again appointed as vice-president of the KPPC. While in this role, he participated in a bike rally from Sidlaghatta during the government led by Shri. Siddaramaiah.

In 2018, he was elected MLA for the sixth time. In 2019, the Congress-JDS coalition government appointed him political secretary to Chief Minister of Karnataka. During the COVID-19 pandemic, he was involved in prevention efforts in Sidlaghatta.
