= Karkala Assembly constituency =

Legislative Assembly constituency in Karnataka State, India

Coordinates: 13.22°N 75°E

Karkala
- Constituency No. 122 for the Karnataka Legislative Assembly

Constituency details
- Country: India
- Region: South India
- State: Karnataka
- District: Udupi
- Lok Sabha constituency: Udupi Chikmagalur
- Established: 1951
- Total electors: 190,611
- Reservation: None

Member of Legislative Assembly
- 16th Karnataka Legislative Assembly
- Incumbent V. Sunil Kumar
- Party: Bharatiya Janata Party
- Elected year: 2023
- Preceded by: H. Gopal Bhandary

Karkala Assembly constituency is one of the 224 Legislative Assembly constituencies of Karnataka in India.

It is part of Udupi district.

== Members of the Legislative Assembly ==
Election	Member	Party
1952	A. B. Shetty	Indian National Congress
1957	Hegde Kanthappa Khedinji	Indian National Congress
1957	Manjappa Ullal	Indian National Congress
1962	Dayanand. R. Kalle	Praja Socialist Party
1967	B. R. Shetty	Bharatiya Jana Sangh
1972	Veerappa Moily	Indian National Congress
1978	Veerappa Moily	Indian National Congress
1983	Veerappa Moily	Indian National Congress
1985	Veerappa Moily	Indian National Congress
1989	Veerappa Moily	Indian National Congress
1994	Veerappa Moily	Indian National Congress
1999	H. Gopal Bhandary	Indian National Congress
2004	V. Sunil Kumar	Bharatiya Janata Party
2008	H. Gopal Bhandary	Indian National Congress
2013	V. Sunil Kumar	Bharatiya Janata Party
2018	V. Sunil Kumar	Bharatiya Janata Party
2023	V. Sunil Kumar	Bharatiya Janata Party

== Election results ==
=== Assembly Election 2023 ===
2023 Karnataka Legislative Assembly election : Karkala
Party	Candidate	Votes	%	±%
BJP	V. Sunil Kumar	77,028	49.11%	▼13.41
INC	Udaya Shetty Muniyal	72,426	46.18%	▲12.82
Independent	Pramod Muthalik	4,508	2.87%	New
NOTA	None of the above	921	0.59%	▼0.33
Margin of victory		4,602	2.93%	▼26.24
Turnout		156,964	82.35%	▲1.69
Total valid votes		156,843		
Registered electors		190,611		▲5.29
BJP hold		Swing	▼13.41	

=== Assembly Election 2018 ===
2018 Karnataka Legislative Assembly election : Karkala
Party	Candidate	Votes	%	±%
BJP	V. Sunil Kumar	91,245	62.52%	▲8.30
INC	H. Gopal Bhandary	48,679	33.36%	▼17.31
AIMEP	Maksood Ahamed	1,817	1.25%	New
BSP	Uday Kumar	1,348	0.92%	▲0.19
NOTA	None of the above	1,340	0.92%	New
Margin of victory		42,566	29.17%	▲25.62
Turnout		146,016	80.66%	▼0.40
Total valid votes		145,935		
Registered electors		181,031		▲12.43
BJP hold		Swing	▲8.30	

=== Assembly Election 2013 ===
2013 Karnataka Legislative Assembly election : Karkala
Party	Candidate	Votes	%	±%
BJP	V. Sunil Kumar	65,039	54.22%	▲4.91
INC	H. Gopal Bhandary	60,785	50.67%	▼0.02
JD(S)	Walter D'souza	1,302	1.09%	New
BSP	Anna Sunil Soans	878	0.73%	New
Independent	U. K. Syad	873	0.73%	New
Margin of victory		4,254	3.55%	▲2.17
Turnout		130,512	81.06%	▲2.91
Total valid votes		119,957		
Registered electors		161,012		▲12.80
BJP gain from INC		Swing	▲3.53	

=== Assembly Election 2008 ===
2008 Karnataka Legislative Assembly election : Karkala
Party	Candidate	Votes	%	±%
INC	H. Gopal Bhandary	56,529	50.69%	▲7.60
BJP	V. Sunil Kumar	54,992	49.31%	▼3.76
Margin of victory		1,537	1.38%	▼8.61
Turnout		111,546	78.15%	▲4.37
Total valid votes		111,521		
Registered electors		142,739		▲7.26
INC gain from BJP		Swing	▼2.38	

=== Assembly Election 2004 ===
2004 Karnataka Legislative Assembly election : Karkala
Party	Candidate	Votes	%	±%
BJP	V. Sunil Kumar	52,061	53.07%	▲16.60
INC	H. Gopal Bhandary	42,266	43.09%	▼19.59
Kannada Nadu Party	Pandarinatha Shenoy. Y	2,205	2.25%	New
JD(S)	Anand Bandimata. C	1,560	1.59%	▲0.75
Margin of victory		9,795	9.99%	▼16.22
Turnout		98,185	73.78%	▲5.38
Total valid votes		98,092		
Registered electors		133,079		▲12.72
BJP gain from INC		Swing	▼9.61	

=== Assembly Election 1999 ===
1999 Karnataka Legislative Assembly election : Karkala
Party	Candidate	Votes	%	±%
INC	H. Gopal Bhandary	49,591	62.68%	▲16.04
BJP	K. P. Shenoy	28,857	36.47%	▲11.18
JD(S)	M. N. Jayakumar	668	0.84%	New
Margin of victory		20,734	26.21%	▲4.86
Turnout		80,759	68.40%	▼1.69
Total valid votes		79,116		
Rejected ballots		1,634	2.02%	▲0.63
Registered electors		118,064		▲5.53
INC hold		Swing	▲16.04	

=== Assembly Election 1994 ===
1994 Karnataka Legislative Assembly election : Karkala
Party	Candidate	Votes	%	±%
INC	Veerappa Moily	36,068	46.64%	▼10.16
BJP	K. P. Shenoy	19,558	25.29%	▲15.06
JD	Balaraj Rai	11,017	14.25%	▼16.64
INC	S. Kumara	9,545	12.34%	New
Margin of victory		16,510	21.35%	▼4.56
Turnout		78,418	70.09%	▲1.23
Total valid votes		77,330		
Rejected ballots		1,088	1.39%	▼1.96
Registered electors		111,881		▲2.73
INC hold		Swing	▼10.16	

=== Assembly Election 1989 ===
1989 Karnataka Legislative Assembly election : Karkala
Party	Candidate	Votes	%	±%
INC	Veerappa Moily	41,171	56.80%	▲3.61
JD	M. K. Vijaya Kumar	22,391	30.89%	New
BJP	B. S. Bhandary	7,416	10.23%	▼34.74
JP	Chandrakeerthi Jain	1,077	1.49%	New
Margin of victory		18,780	25.91%	▲17.69
Turnout		74,993	68.86%	▼4.03
Total valid votes		72,482		
Rejected ballots		2,511	3.35%	▲2.35
Registered electors		108,913		▲25.43
INC hold		Swing	▲3.61	

=== Assembly Election 1985 ===
1985 Karnataka Legislative Assembly election : Karkala
Party	Candidate	Votes	%	±%
INC	Veerappa Moily	33,330	53.19%	▲1.34
BJP	M. K. Vijaya Kumar	28,178	44.97%	▲4.81
Margin of victory		5,152	8.22%	▼3.48
Turnout		63,293	72.89%	▲3.24
Total valid votes		62,663		
Rejected ballots		630	1.00%	▼0.52
Registered electors		86,829		▲17.97
INC hold		Swing	▲1.34	

=== Assembly Election 1983 ===
1983 Karnataka Legislative Assembly election : Karkala
Party	Candidate	Votes	%	±%
INC	Veerappa Moily	26,176	51.85%	▲48.64
BJP	M. K. Vijaya Kumar	20,272	40.16%	New
JP	A. C. Amin	3,352	6.64%	▼32.30
Independent	K. Parmanand Kukian	682	1.35%	New
Margin of victory		5,904	11.70%	▼4.92
Turnout		51,259	69.65%	▼7.86
Total valid votes		50,482		
Rejected ballots		777	1.52%	▼0.05
Registered electors		73,600		▲4.19
INC gain from INC(I)		Swing	▼3.71	

=== Assembly Election 1978 ===
1978 Karnataka Legislative Assembly election : Karkala
Party	Candidate	Votes	%	±%
INC(I)	Veerappa Moily	29,941	55.56%	New
JP	M. K. Vijaya Kumar	20,985	38.94%	New
INC	B. Vittal Salian	1,732	3.21%	▼64.52
Independent	R. Nirmala Kumar	576	1.07%	New
Independent	K. Krishna Moorthy	407	0.76%	New
Margin of victory		8,956	16.62%	▼37.16
Turnout		54,753	77.51%	▲14.25
Total valid votes		53,893		
Rejected ballots		860	1.57%	▲1.57
Registered electors		70,641		▲17.04
INC(I) gain from INC		Swing	▼12.17	

=== Assembly Election 1972 ===
1972 Mysore State Legislative Assembly election : Karkala
Party	Candidate	Votes	%	±%
INC	Veerappa Moily	25,360	67.73%	▲26.47
INC(O)	Sunder Hegde	5,224	13.95%	New
ABJS	Bola Raghurama Shetty	4,303	11.49%	▼45.55
Independent	Perody Vittal Shetty	2,214	5.91%	New
Independent	Y. Thanyappa	340	0.91%	New
Margin of victory		20,136	53.78%	▲38.00
Turnout		38,184	63.26%	▼5.42
Total valid votes		37,441		
Registered electors		60,356		▲11.39
INC gain from ABJS		Swing	▲10.69	

=== Assembly Election 1967 ===
1967 Mysore State Legislative Assembly election : Karkala
Party	Candidate	Votes	%	±%
ABJS	B. R. Shetty	20,112	57.04%	New
INC	N. Hegde	14,548	41.26%	▲2.29
Independent	H. V. Kini	600	1.70%	New
Margin of victory		5,564	15.78%	▼4.31
Turnout		37,211	68.68%	▲4.05
Total valid votes		35,260		
Registered electors		54,182		▲16.45
ABJS gain from PSP		Swing	▼2.01	

=== Assembly Election 1962 ===
1962 Mysore State Legislative Assembly election : Karkala
Party	Candidate	Votes	%	±%
PSP	Dayanand. R. Kalle	17,234	59.05%	▲21.87
INC	K. K. Hegde	11,372	38.97%	▼23.85
Independent	R. Devaraya Shenoy	578	1.98%	New
Margin of victory		5,862	20.09%	▼5.55
Turnout		30,071	64.63%	▲19.32
Total valid votes		29,184		
Registered electors		46,527		▼50.39
PSP gain from INC		Swing	▼3.77	

=== Assembly Election 1957 ===
1957 Mysore State Legislative Assembly election : Karkala
Party	Candidate	Votes	%	±%
INC	Hegde Kanthappa Khedinji	26,696	62.82%	▲16.22
PSP	Sheonoy Devaraya Ranga. R	15,801	37.18%	New
INC	Manjappa Ullal			
Margin of victory		10,895	25.64%	▲15.58
Turnout		42,497	45.31%	▼14.01
Total valid votes		42,497		
Registered electors		93,788		▲41.12
INC hold		Swing	▲16.22	

=== Assembly Election 1952 ===
1952 Madras State Legislative Assembly election : Karkala
Party	Candidate	Votes	%	±%
INC	A. B. Shetty	18,370	46.60%	New
KMPP	Dharmasamarajaya	14,404	36.54%	New
Independent	R. Shenoi Devaraya	6,649	16.87%	New
Margin of victory		3,966	10.06%	
Turnout		39,423	59.32%	
Total valid votes		39,423		
Registered electors		66,461		
INC win (new seat)				

== See also ==
- List of constituencies of the Karnataka Legislative Assembly
- Udupi district
