= Ammapet =

Ammapet Ammapettai
- Town
- Ammapet, Salem, Tamil Nadu
- Coordinates: 11.6548°N 78.1877°E
- Country: India
- State: Tamil Nadu
- District: Salem
- Elevation: 313.28 m (1,027.8 ft)

Languages
  - Official: Tamil, English
  - Speech: Tamil, English
- Time zone: UTC+5:30 (IST)
- PIN: 636003
- Telephone code: +91427xxxxxxx
- Vehicle registration: TN 54 ** xxxx
- Other Neighbourhoods: Salem, Suramangalam, Gugai, Kondalampatti, Kandhampatti, Gorimedu, Hasthampatti
- Corporation: Salem City Municipal Corporation
- LS: Salem
- VS: Salem South

Ammapet also called as "Ammapettai" is a town in Salem district of Tamil Nadu state in India.

== Location ==
Ammapet is located with the coordinates of (11.6548°N 78.1877°E) in Salem.

Ammapet (Salem)

== Medical facilities ==
There is a secondary (government) hospital, constructed at a cost of about ₹42 crore, funded by Japan International Cooperation Agency, by which people of rural areas of Salem are benefited, is located in Ammapet.

== Religion ==
=== Hindu temples ===
Two Hindu temples viz., Madheswaran Temple and Madurai Veeran Temple which are maintained under the control of Hindu Religious and Charitable Endowments Department, Government of Tamil Nadu are situated in Ammapet.
