= Visalakshi (disambiguation) =

Visalakshi is an epithet of the Hindu goddess Parvati. Visalakshi may also refer to:

== People ==
- Visalakshi Nityanand, Indian music vocalist
- A. Visalakshi, Indian politician
- Dwivedula Visalakshi (1929–2014), Indian writer in Telugu

== Other uses ==
- Visalakshi Nagar, neighborhood in Visakhapatnam, Andhra Pradesh, India
- Sri GVG Visalakshi College for Women, college in India
- Kunnuvarankottai Kasi Visalakshi-Viswanathar Temple, temple in Tamil Nadu, India
