= Chong Chiu Sen =

Malaysian-born Chinese Carnatic vocalist

Chong Chiu Sen 张秋胜
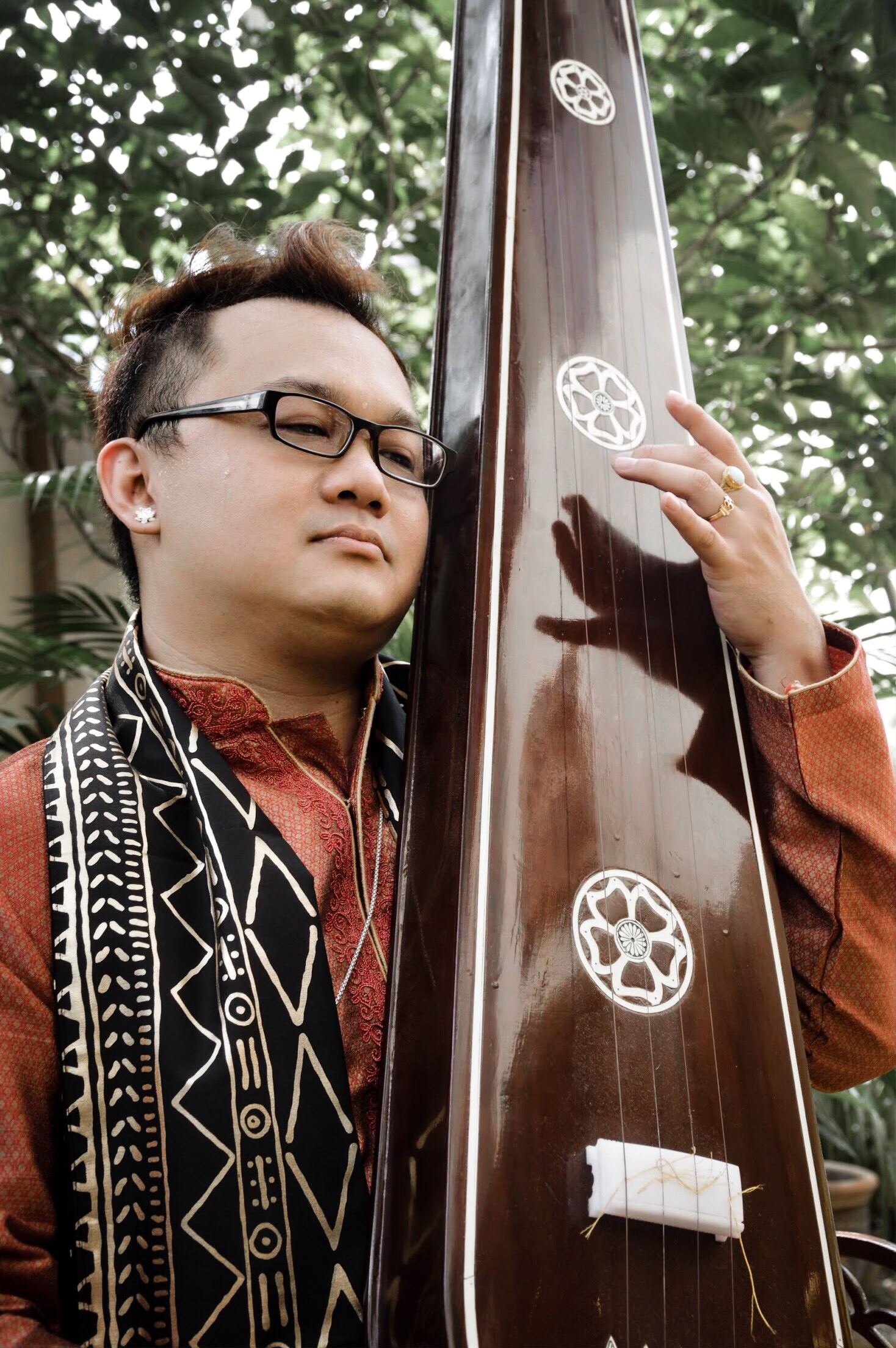

Background information
- Also known as: Sai Madhana Mohan Kumar
- Genres: Carnatic music, Indian classical music, Bhajan
- Occupation: Vocalist
- Instrument: Harmonium
- Website: Chong Chiu Sen on Facebook

Chong Chiu Sen is a Malaysian-born Chinese Carnatic vocalist. He was an apprentice of Carnatic musician D. K. Pattammal who also adopted him as her god-grandson and named him Sai Madhana Mohan Kumar.

== Biography ==
Chong was introduced to Carnatic music through Bhajans. He started formal training in Bhajan singing under the tutelage of Datin Shanthi Jegathesan and R. Vatsala in Malaysia. Chong was interested in both, playing the harmonium and singing Bhajans. He learned to play the harmonium from Jullius Tan Teck Joo and practiced basic vocal training under Vijayalakshmi Kulaveerasingam from Kuala Lumpur, Malaysia.

Subsequently, he studied Bharatha Natyam under Usha Srinivasan and started learning the veena under Sangeetha Kala Acharya, Kalpakam Swaminathan. He had an opportunity to meet Padma Vibhushan, Sangita Kalanidhi, Gana Sarasvati, Smt. D.K Pattammal at her home and sing for her. His rendition of Maha Ganapathim in raga nattai convinced her to accept him as her student. She later adopted him as her god-grandson and name him Sai Madhana Mohan Kumar.

After 2006, Chiu Sen continued his music lessons under Pattammal's granddaughter, Gayathri Sundararaman. In Malaysia, Chiu Sen is guided by Visalakshi Nityanand and his friend in the USA, Kamalakiran Vinjamuri has been helping him in various aspects of music.

In year 2021, Chiu Sen sought guidance under N. Vijay Siva to continue the Patantaram of the DKP-DKJ School of Music.

== Major performances ==
- On February 16, 2024, as part of the Chinese New Year celebrations at Prasanthi Nilayam in Puttaparthi, Chong Chiu Sen and his esteemed music team were honored to present a selection of devotional songs in various Indian languages during a musical program.
- 27 August 2017, he was invited to perform in Brindavan, Sri Sathya Sai Baba Ashram (Whitefield), Kadugodi, Bengaluru.
- 27 December 2016, Chong performed his 1st full fledge Carnatic music concert during Chennai Music Season under Sri Rama Bhakta Jana Samaj Music Festival.
- 21 November 2013, he performed during Sri Sathya Sai Baba's 88th birthday celebration in Puttaparthi.
- 1 January 2006, he performed in the 79th Annual Conference of The Music Academy in Chennai.
- 12 November 2005, he performed during the 32nd National Festival Spirit of Unity concerts for the Universal Integration Committee.

== Awards and recognition ==
- On 15th Jan 2023, Chong received the title ‘MAHARAJ’ bestowed by World Shirdi Sai Baba Organization (UK).
- LIFE TIME ACHIEVEMENT AWARD 2019 given by Shirdi Sai Baba Society of Malaysia in recognition of a lifetime of Dedication, Commitment and Devotion in promoting significantly the Indian Carnatic Music & Sai Bhajans nationally & globally.
- In 2019, Chong received the title ‘GAANA GANDHARVA’ bestowed by ICC & Temple, Memphis, TN, USA.
- On 10 March 2018, Chong was the recipient of THE OUTSTANDING PERSON AWARD for Promoting Culture given by AIKYA Oneness through music | Global Adjustments Foundation.
- On 27 November 2015, he received an award from Padma Vibhushan Pandit Jasraj for the Pt. Jasraj — Rotary Club of Hyderabad AWARD FOR CROSS CULTURAL UNDERSTANDING in Hyderabad.
