= Alagapuram, Salem =

Alagapuram அழகாபுரம்
- Metropolitan Area
- Location in Salem, India Alagapuram (Tamil Nadu) Alagapuram (India)
- Coordinates: 11.6863°N 78.1474°E
- Country: India
- State: Tamil Nadu
- District: Salem
- Assembly constituency: Salem West
- Lok Sabha constituency: Salem
- Elevation: 288 m (945 ft)
- Time zone: IST (UTC+5:30)

Alagapuram is metro area in Hastampatti zone of Salem City Municipal Corporation. Alagapuram is a locality in Salem in Tamil Nadu, India.

== Nearby areas ==
Arumugam Nagar, Bhuvaneswari Nagar, Thangavel Nagar, Thangavel Nagar, MDS Nagar are the nearby localities to Alagapuram.
