= A. Ramachandran (politician) =

Tamil politician

6th Mayor of Salem
- Incumbent
- Assumed office 4 March 2022
- Deputy: M. Saradha Devi
- Preceded by: S. Soundappan

Councillor, Salem City Municipal Corporation
- Incumbent
- Assumed office 2 March 2022
- Constituency: Ward 6

Personal details
- Born: 1944 (age 81–82) Salem, Madras Province, British India
- Party: Dravida Munnetra Kazhagam (1961-present)
- Spouse: Meenatchi
- Children: Sudharsan Babu (son); Sumithra (daughter)
- Parent: Arumugam (father)
- Education: SSLC
- Occupation: Politician
- Nickname(s): AR, Periyavar (elder)

Arumugam Ramachandran is an Indian politician and the incumbent Mayor of Salem. A member of the Dravida Munnetra Kazhagam (DMK) since 1961, he has served in a number of posts in the DMK's Salem unit.

== Early life ==
Ramachandran was born to Arumugam of Gorimedu, Salem in 1944. He studied up to SSLC.

== Politics ==
=== Early years and recognition ===
In 1961, Ramachandran joined the Dravida Munnetra Kazhagam (DMK), then headed by C.N. Annadurai. He participated in many protests held by DMK and went to prison numerous times. Later, he became close with senior DMK leaders such as Arcot N. Veeraswami, K. Sundaram, Parithi Ilamvazhuthi, and C. Chittibabu. During his three-year stay in Chennai, Ramachandran worked with Chittibabu to erect a number of DMK flagpoles as instructed by the party's former president M. Karunanidhi. When Karunanidhi came to hoist the flag on these poles, he saw the name "Gorimedu Ramachandran" in the inscriptions beneath them and became curious to know about him. Eventually, Ramachandran met Karunanidhi and then his son M. K. Stalin.

=== Posts held in the party ===
After his return to Salem, Ramachandran resumed his partywork as member of the DMK's branch executive committee and branch secretary. In 1984, upon the recommendation of A. L. Thangavel (then DMK union secretary for Salem District) Ramachandran was appointed by Veerapandy S. Arumugam (then Salem District secretary) as the party's representative for Salem district. After some time, he became the party treasurer for Hastampatti area.

After the death of Veerapandy S. Arumugam in 2012, his successor R. Rajendran (secretary of Salem Central District DMK), appointed Ramachandran as Hastampatti area secretary. Additionally, he became the secretary of the Parent teacher association at Kamarajar Girls Higher Secondary School, Manakkadu.

=== 2022 civic polls ===
In the February 2022 Tamil Nadu urban local body elections, Ramachandran contested in Ward 6 of the Salem City Municipal Corporation. He defeated his nearest rival Vishnu Parthiban (of the AMMK) by a margin of 1,068 votes. Consequently, Ramachandran took oath as councillor on 2 March. The next day, the DMK's leadership declared him as its mayoral candidate for indirect election to the post. As no other candidate from the elected councillors filed their nomination for Mayorship, Ramachandran was elected unopposed to the post. He was sworn in as the sixth Mayor of Salem on 4 March, along with M. Saradha Devi (INC councillor from Ward 7) as his deputy.

== Mayorship (2022-) ==
Upon taking charge as Mayor, Ramachandran indicated that his focus would be on providing basic amenities such as water, drainage and road facilities. Later, he also mentioned the redeveloping of Panamarathupatti lake as one of his goals.

== Personal life ==
Ramachandran is married to Meenatchi. The couple has a son named Sudarsan Babu and a daughter named Sumithra.

Sudarsan Babu is a regional manager in Tamil Nadu Civil Supplies Corporation. Sumithra is a teacher at Government Higher Secondary School, Kannankurichi.

== See also ==
- List of mayors of Salem, Tamil Nadu
- Salem City Municipal Corporation
