= Salem Central Prison =

Prison in Tamil Nadu, India

- Location in Salem Salem Central Prison (Tamil Nadu) Salem Central Prison (India)
- Location: Hastampatti, Salem; 11.6815°N 78.1598°E
- Status: Operational
- Security class: Central Prison
- Capacity: 1,431
- Opened: 1862
- Managed by: Tamil Nadu Prison Department
- Director: Shanmugasundaram.G (DIG of Prisons, Coimbatore range)
- Website: http://www.prisons.tn.nic.in

Salem Central Prison is a prison constructed in 1862 near Hastampatti in Salem, Tamil Nadu, India. It was initially built to house adult prisoners. However, as the need arose to accommodate adolescent prisoners, a jail annex was constructed in 1934 specifically for this purpose.

== History ==
The Prison Regulation Act was first introduced in 1835 under the name Prison Reform Scheme. According to this Act, the Central Jail was built in Salem in the year 1862 during the British rule. The prison has an area of 113.19 acres. The jail has a total of 1432 individual cells. And the British used this jail to keep a series of prisoners. Salem Central Jail is known as Karupukulla Jail (Tamil: கருப்புகுல்லா சிறை) and Alangottai Jail.

In February 1950, the jail witnessed a brutal incident of police shooting and killing 22 inmates. Around 19 of them were Communist Party of India workers from Malabar District.

== Prison Infrastructure ==
This prison is spread across an area of 113.19 acres, providing ample space for its various facilities. The authorized accommodation of the prison is 1,431. This prison was originally classified to house repeat offenders but in 2024, it was reclassified as a casual prison, meaning first-time offenders can be housed there.

== Prison Initiatives ==
As a part of rehabilitation of prisoners, The Department of Prisons and Correctional Services, takes some initiatives and implements various schemes.

=== Computer coaching centre ===
Prisons authorities launched the centre offers offline computer coaching centre in Salem Central Prison on 9 July 2024. Coaching center offers prisoners to learn basic computer knowledge including, Microsoft office, including MS Word, MS Excel, MS PowerPoint, Photoshop, Printing, Xerox, Scanning and Operation.

=== Thozhirpettai ===
Salem Central Prison officials launched initiative called Thozhirpettai for prisoners for developing self employment skills, and experts provides training to prisoners in various fields. Salem Central Prison superintendent G.Vinoth inaugurated this initiative on 22 June 2024.

=== Reading initiative ===
The Prison department undertaken initiative called "Valluvar Vaasagar Vattam" (Reading Circle) as a part of rehabilitation of prisoners. G. Vinoth Superintendent of Salem Central Prison formally started this initiative in September 2023 for improving reading skills among prisoners. Collection of 6000 volumes were sourced from prison library for this purpose.

=== Vaazhkai paalam ===
Vaazhkai Paalam (Tamil: வாழ்க்கை பாலம்) is an initiative by prison department. This scheme is initiated on November 2, 2023, for giving counselling and training from social workers and psychologist for prisoners who were with suicidal thoughts. Prison officials stated that, this initiative shows positive response among prisoners.

=== Prison petrol bunk ===
Salem Prison launched a petrol bunk, manned by prisoners. Petrol bunk is located in Salem - Yercaud state Highway. ₹200 will pay for Prisoners who works in the bunk.

=== Sports event ===
Prison officials conducted sports event for inmates to control th from depression and suicidal thoughts. 30 inmates out of 1,060 were participated in various events held on 7 December 2023.

=== Exam coaching center ===
Prison administration launched a competitive exam coaching center for family members of prison staffs. In October 2023 prison administration started daycare center and tution centre for prison staffs and their family members.

== Architectural Design ==
The architectural design of this prison is unique, with a circular shape resembling lotus petals. All the cells face inwardly towards a central point, creating a distinct and centralized layout. Prison has 15 blocks namely, Higher Security Block, Factory Block, Remand Block, Hospital Block, New Admission Block, Convict Block and Goondas Block.
