= Salem City Municipal Corporation =

Municipal governing body of Salem, India

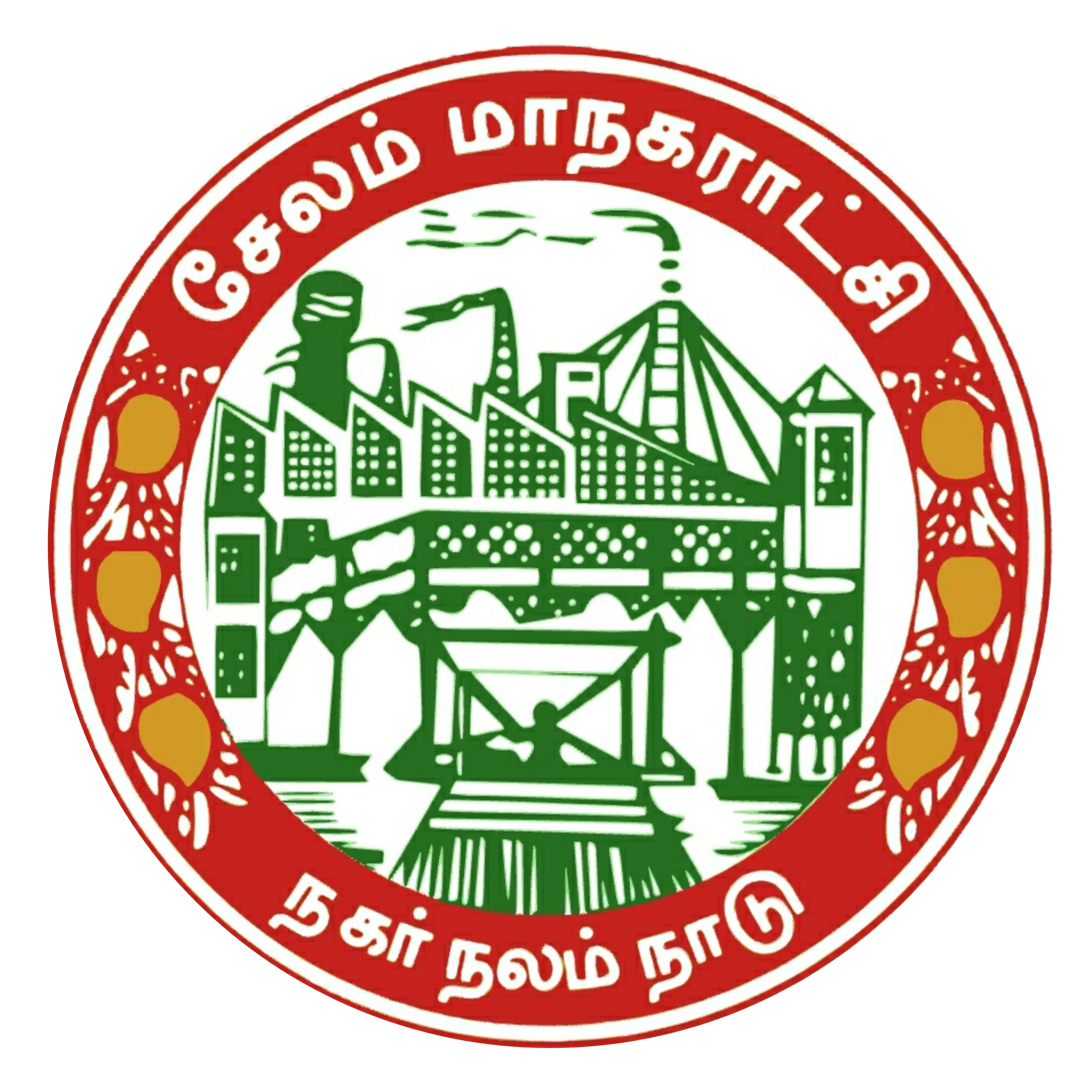
- Salem Corporation emblem

Type
- Type: Municipal Corporation
- Houses: 2 Houses: Legislature Assembly; Executive Assembly
- Established: 1 April 1866 (160 years ago)

Leadership
- Mayor: A. Ramachandran
- Deputy Mayor: Saradha Devi
- Commissioner: Lalith Aditya Neelam IAS
- District Collector: Ilam Bahavath, IAS
- City Police Commissioner: Tr. Joshi Nirmal Kumar IPS

Structure
- Seats: 60
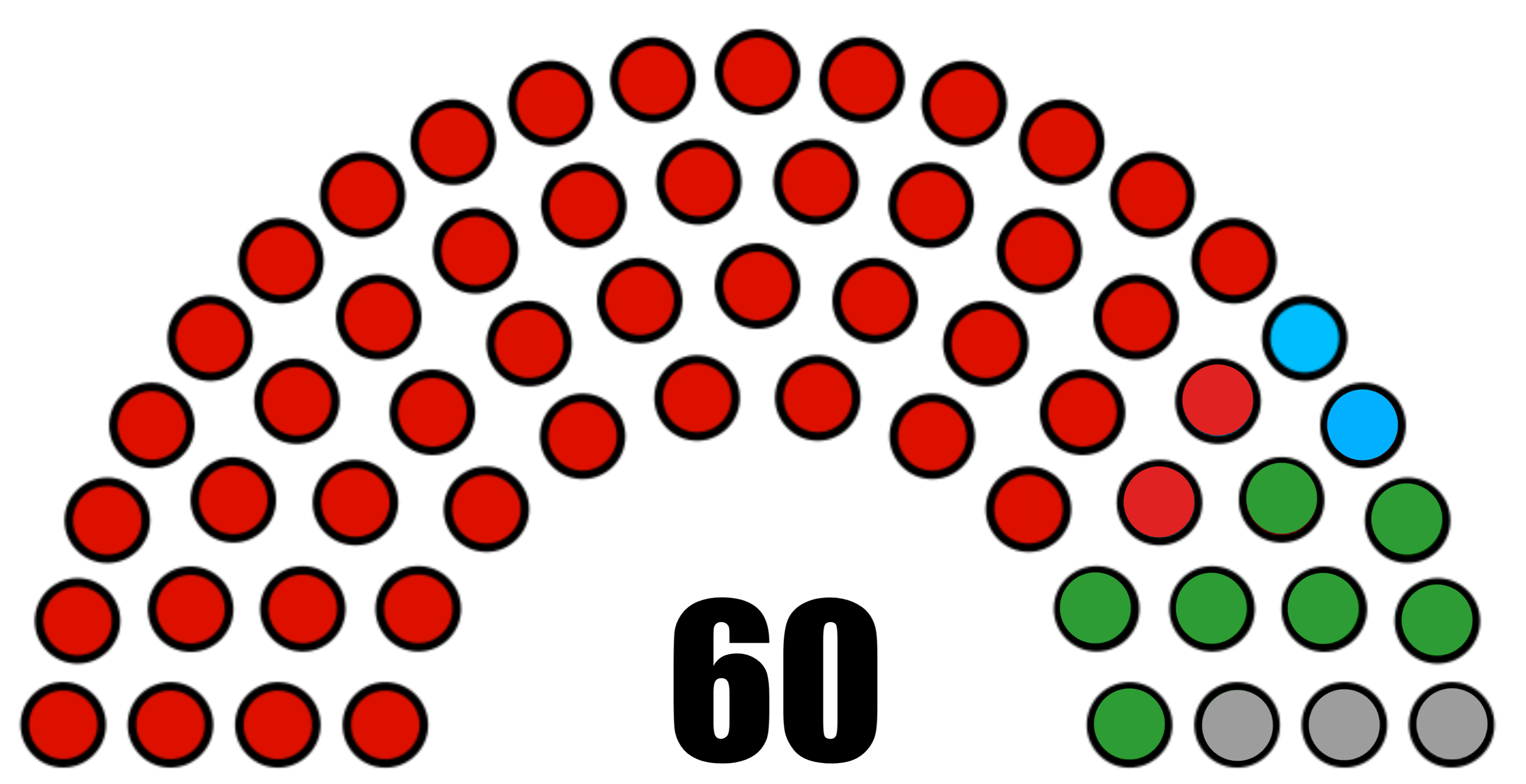
- Political groups: Government (48): SPA (48); DMK (48); Opposition (12): AIADMK+ (7); AIADMK (7); TVK+ (2); INC (2); Others (3); IND (3)
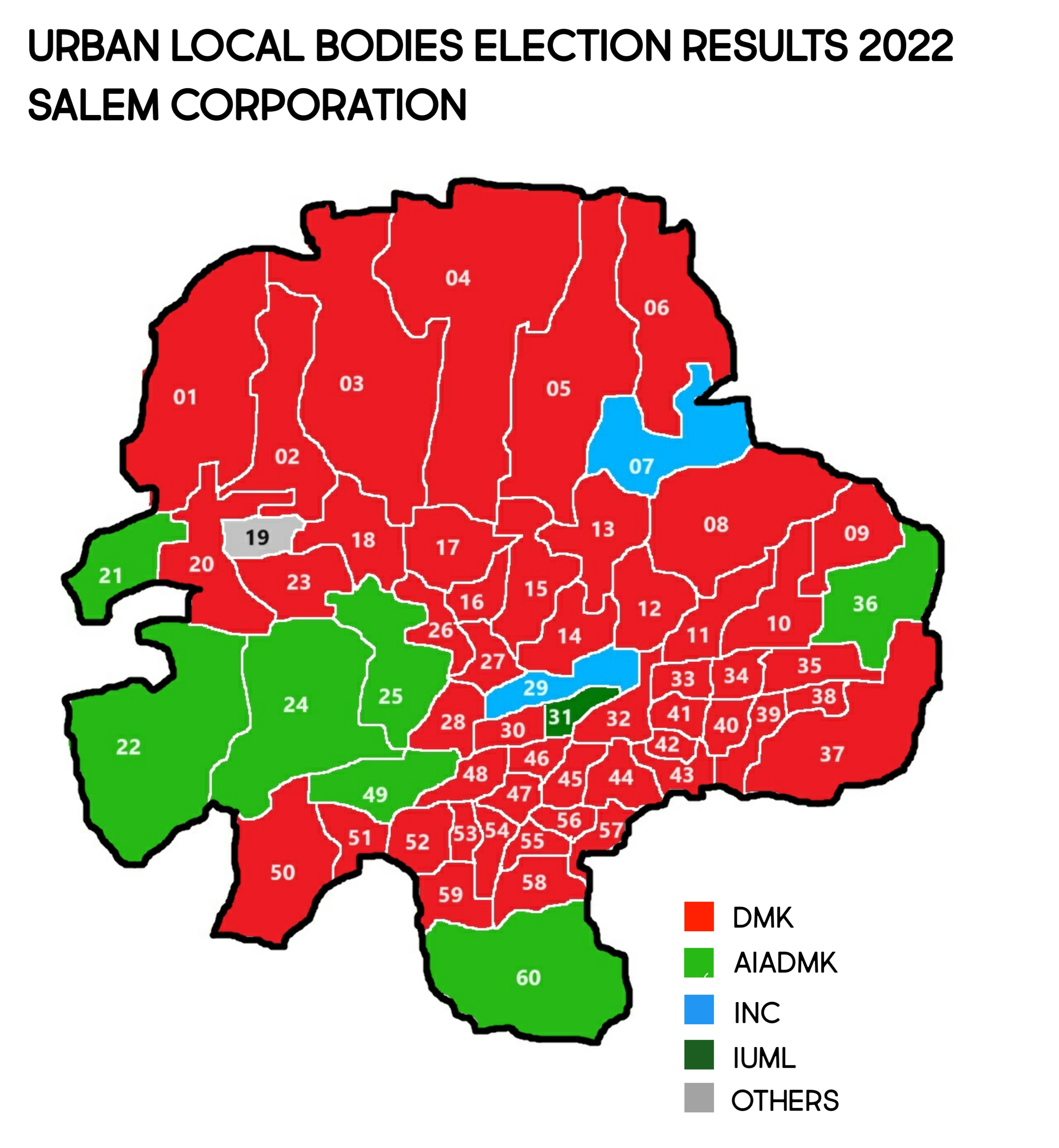
- Ward: 60
- Zones: 4 Zones: Hastampatti; Ammapettai; Kondalampatti; Suramangalam

Elections
- Voting system: First past the post
- Last election: 19 February 2022
- Next election: 2027

Motto
- நகர் நலம் நாடு (tamil); City Wealth Country

Meeting place
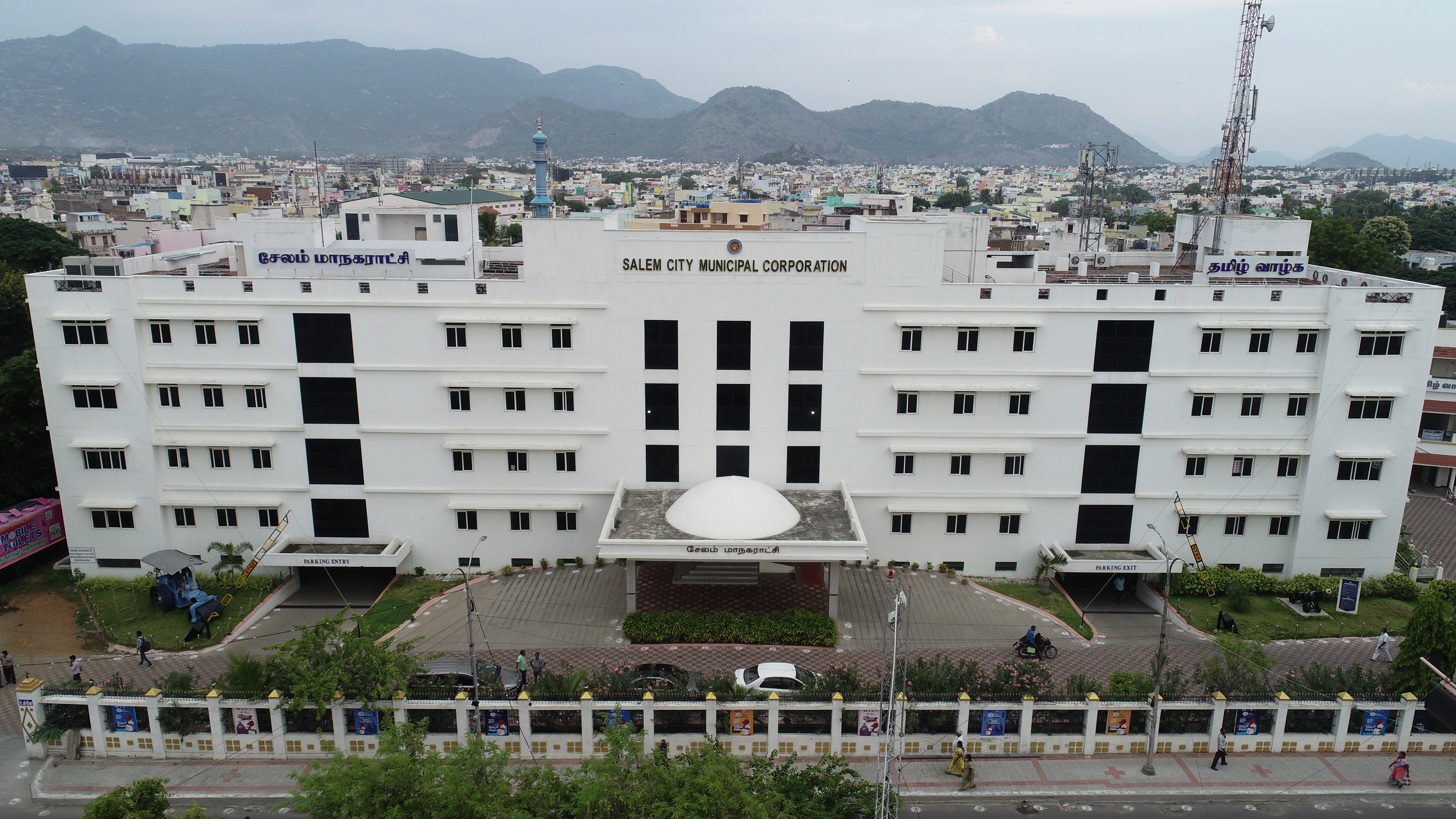

Website
- www.salemcorporation.gov.in

Salem City Municipal Corporation (SCMC) is a civic body that governs Salem city, Tamil Nadu, India. It consists of a legislative and an executive body. The legislative body is headed by the city mayor while the executive body is headed by a Chief Commissioner. This corporation consists of 60 wards and is headed by a Mayor who presides over a Deputy Mayor and 60 councillors who represent each ward in the city. SCMC is the fifth largest municipal corporation in Tamil Nadu. For administrative purposes, the Salem corporation is divided into four zones: Suramangalam, Hasthampatty, Ammapettai, and Kondalampatty. Each Zonal Office has its own Zonal Chairman and an Asst. Commissioner to take care of Zonal Activities.

== History ==
The Centurion Municipality was declared as the Salem City Municipal Corporation on 1 June 1994. The Salem City Municipal Council celebrated its centenary in 1966. Fittingly the Municipality was upgraded into a special grade Municipality with effect from 1 April 1979. Salem City Municipal Limits were further extended by the inclusion of Suramangalam Municipality, Jarikondalampatty Town Panchayat, Kannankurichi Town Panchayat and 21 other Village panchayats with effect from 1.4.94, with an extent of 91.34 km^{2} (35.27 sq mi) and a total population of 8,29,267 (2011 Census). Salem is the Headquarters of the Salem district.

Salem Corporation consists of 60 wards categorized under 4 Zonal Offices namely Suramangalam Zonal, Hasthampatty Zonal, Ammapet Zonal, Kondalampatty Zonal. Each Zonal Office has its own Zonal Chairman and an Asst. Commissioner to take care of Zonal Activities.

== Forums ==
Salem City Municipal Corporation consist of 2 Houses, namely,

- Legislature Assembly
- Executive Assembly

=== Legislature Assembly ===
Legislature Assembly is one of the assembly councils in SCMC. This is headed by city Mayor who presides over Deputy Mayor and 60 councillors who represents each ward of the city.

=== Executive Assembly ===
Executive Assembly is also one of the two assembly council of SCMC. This is headed by Chief Commissioner, the person graded with IAS position. There are 4 zonal officers under City Chief Commissioner. This assembly executes the decision taken in both the assembly particularly in Legislature Assembly.

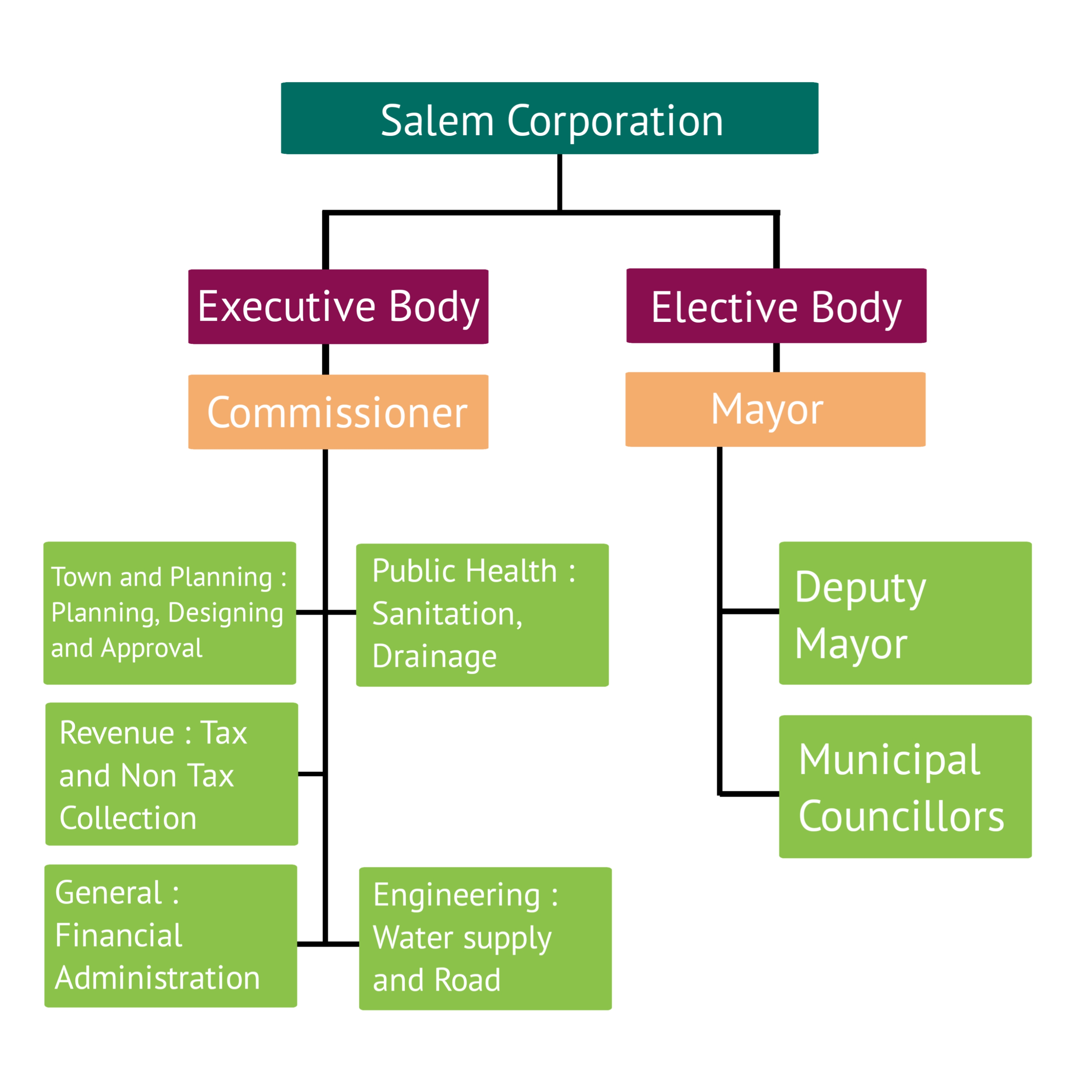
Organisational structure of SCMC

== Zones ==
Zones
Suramangalam	Hastampatti	Ammapettai	Kondalampatti
Wards
60

Commissioner	Mayor	Deputy Mayor	Zonal Heads	Member of SCMC wards
S. Balachander Indian Administrative Service	A. Ramachandran Dravida Munnetra Kazhagam	Saradha devi Indian National Congress	4	60

== Administrations ==
City officials, as of March 2022
Mayor	A. Ramachandran DMK
Deputy Mayor	M. Saradha Devi INC
Corporation Commissioner	S. Balachander IAS
Commissioner of Police	Vijayakumari IPS

From among themselves, the councillors elect the mayor and a deputy mayor who preside over about ten standing committees. The council normally meets once a month. The executive wing is headed by the Commissioner. In addition, there are deputy commissioners, various heads of departments and four zonal officers.

=== Municipal finance ===
According to financial data published on the CityFinance Portal of the Ministry of Housing and Urban Affairs, the Salem City Municipal Corporation reported total revenue receipts of ₹275 crore (US$33 million) and total expenditure of ₹404 crore (US$49 million) in 2022–23. Tax revenue accounted for about 39.3% of the total revenue, while the corporation received ₹85 crore in grants during the financial year.

== Elections ==
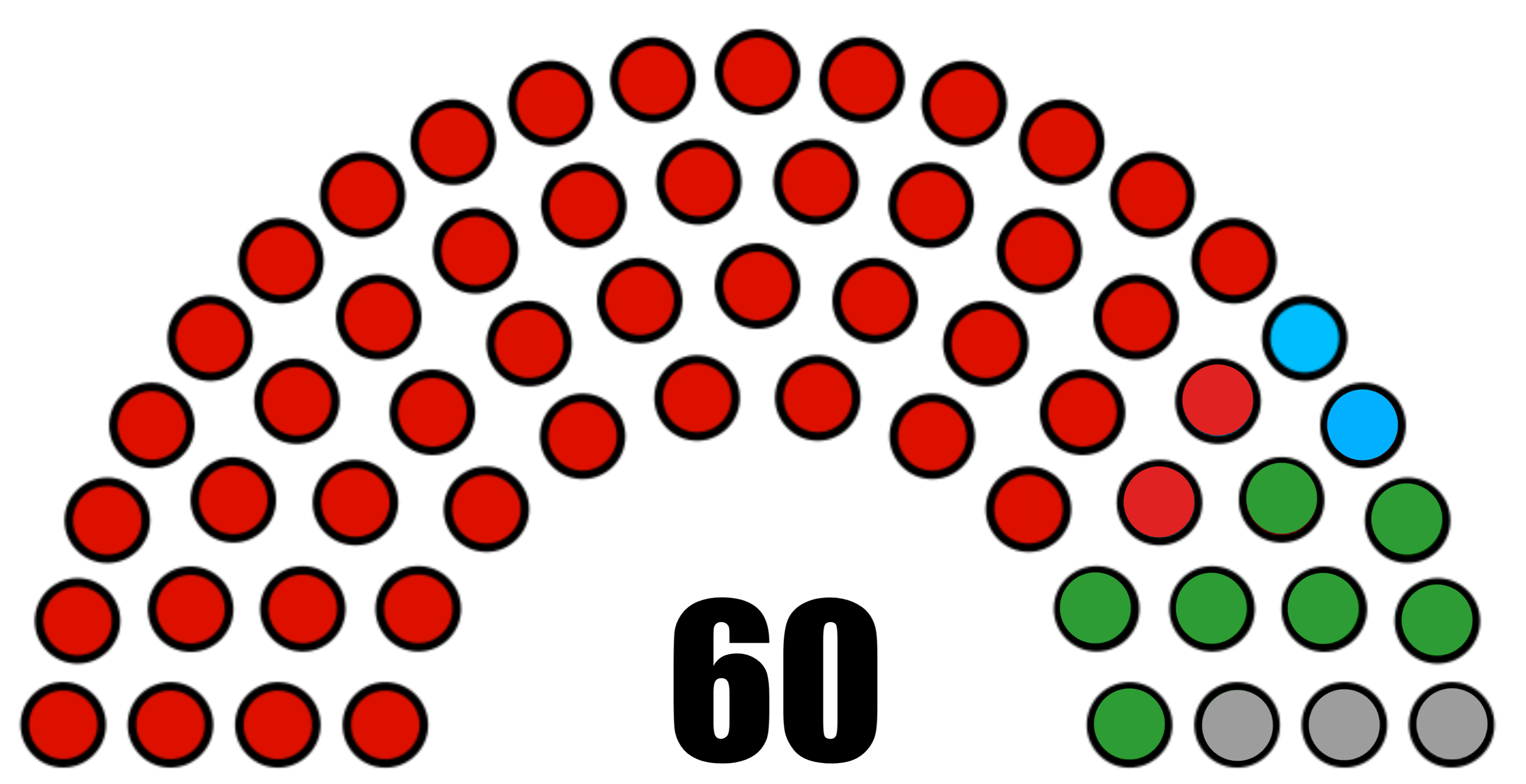
2022 Salem Municipal Corporation Election Dravida Munnetra Kazhagam: 48 seats Indian National Congress: 2 seats All India Anna Dravida Munnetra Kazhagam: 7 seats Independent : 3 seats

The seats of the mayor, deputy mayor and the Salem Corporation Council have been vacant since 2016. As part of the 2022 Tamil Nadu urban civic body elections, the Salem City Municipal Corporation went to polling on 19 February 2022, alongside 20 other municipal corporations of Tamil Nadu, to elect 60 councillors to represent the city's 60 wards; the councillors will choose one amongst themselves as the Mayor of Salem, a historically significant, coveted office. The election results were announced on 22 February 2022 by the Tamil Nadu State Election Commission. The Dravida Munnetra Kazhagam (DMK) won 48 out of the total 60 wards in Salem, with the other parties in its Secular Progressive Alliance winning 2 seats by Indian National Congress. The All India Anna Dravida Munnetra Kazhagam (AIADMK) won 7 seats. 3 independent candidates won in their respective wards. Having secured an absolute majority, the DMK councillors will formally elect the Mayor and the Deputy Mayor on 4 March 2022.

== Emblem ==
Salem Corporation is centurion municipality in 1966. Centurion municipality became Salem Municipal corporation in 1994. After forming municipal corporation unique emblem for corporation is created. It is created with city's unique identities in emblem. The emblem holds the theme of urbanization of the city by including the icons of industries and households. It also consists of six mangoes icon, three on each side of the emblem, which indicates the fame of the city. It also holds the tag line (Nagar Nalam Naadu) which means the growth of the country begins with the growth of the city (tamil நகர் நலம் நாடு).

== Departments ==
S.No	Department
1	Finance
2	Developmental Planning
3	Health and Family Welfare
4	Rehabilitation Project Committee
5	Smart City Project Committee
6	Income Tax Department
7	Educational and Sports Developmental Authority

== List of mayors ==
S.No. (Note: A parenthetical number indicates that the incumbent has previously held office.)	Portrait	Name	Elected Ward	Political Party (Note: This column only names the mayor's party. The corporation the mayor heads may be a complex coalition of several parties and independents; these are not listed here.)	Term of Office			Corporation Election
S.No.	Portrait	Name	Elected Ward	Political Party	From	To	Days in office	Corporation Election
1		G. Soodamani		Dravida Munnetra Kazhagam	1996	2001	1st (5 years)	1st
2		Suresh Kumar	Directly elected	All India Anna Dravida Munnetra Kazhagam	2001	2006	1st (5 years)	2nd
3		S. Soundappan		All India Anna Dravida Munnetra Kazhagam	2006	2006	1st (210 days)	2nd
4		J. Rekha Priyadharshini	Directly elected	Dravida Munnetra Kazhagam	2006	2011	1st (5 years)	3rd
(5)		S. Soundappan	Directly elected	All India Anna Dravida Munnetra Kazhagam	2011	24 October 2016	2nd (5 years)	4th
Corporation / Mayoralty suspended (25 October 2016 – 2 March 2022)
6		A. Ramachandran	6	Dravida Munnetra Kazhagam	4 March 2022	Incumbent	1st (4 years, 206 days)	5th

== Salem Smart City ==
In the State of Tamil Nadu, there are 11 Smart Cities and Salem is one among the 11 Smart Cities as identified by Ministry of Housing & Urban Affairs, GoI. Salem is the fifth largest city in Tamil Nadu. The name 'Salem' appears to have been derived from Sela or Shalya by which the term refers to the country around the hills, as in the inscriptions. The city's vision emphases upon enlightening the city's potentials and eliminating its weakness. Salem is known for its industrial base and has varied small scale commercial business. The Coimbatore – Bangalore Industrial corridor and Coimbatore – Salem Industrial corridor proposals paves way for economic development in the city. Hence a base for these activities is an indispensable need. Provision of urban services is efficient but lacks technological interventions thus craving a need for smart technologies in service delivery. The identified Smart City area is the Central Business District of Salem holding an area of 690 acre and it is inhabited by approximately 8% (71,295 persons) of the total Salem population (8,29,267 persons). The existence of city bus stand as well as the market areas attracts large volume of population from all over. It holds humungous opportunities for growth and improvement of local livelihood. Accordingly the core city area with maximum coverage was taken up which included; Mix of high commercial activities, congested transit hubs (old bus stand & railway station), narrow roads, diverse traffic composition, dense residential pockets, markets, informal hawking areas, heritage places, rejuvenation of Thirumanimutharu river channel to cater environmental problems and also ensuring a mix of different social and income groups. The vision of Salem Smart City is making the identified Central Business District in to a vibrant commercial business center by providing an enhanced core infrastructure with ICT based solutions, Transit Oriented Development to boost local economy, promote interactions, and ensure citizen security.

The Government of India launched Smart Cities Mission on 25 June 2015. The objective is to promote sustainable and inclusive cities that provide core infrastructure and give a decent quality of life to its citizens, a clean and sustainable environment and application of ‘Smart solutions’. The Smart city mission covers 100 cities in India, and Salem is covered as one of the Smart city in India, with the vision ""To establish Salem as commercial cum industrial hub with a diversified economic base that provides equitable opportunities to all and to provide paramount quality services through leading edge technology on the foundation of New Urbanism principles." As a part of Smart City initiatives, the State-of-the-art Integrated Command Control Centre (Centre) needs to be set up. This ICCC shall effectively bring all necessary data pointers from various sources such ULB, police, transport, water, sewerage, power, etc. under one roof through electronic data integrations. The ICCC solution shall be able to consume such data and predict useful information which would be useful for authorities to take informed decision making. The Command and Control Centre (CCC) acts as a fulcrum in effectively integrating most of the envisaged smart city works.

The Mission is operated as a Centrally Sponsored Scheme. Central Government will give financial support to the extent of Rs. 48,000 crores over 5 years i.e. on an average Rs.100 crore per city per year. An equal amount on a matching basis is to be provided by the State/ULB. Additional resources are to be raised through convergence, from ULBs’ own funds, grants under Finance Commission, innovative finance mechanisms such as Municipal Bonds, other government programs and borrowings. Emphasis has been given on the participation of private sector through Public Private Partnerships (PPP). Citizens’ aspirations were captured in the Smart City Proposals (SCPs) prepared by the selected cities. Aggregated at the national level, these proposals contained more than 5,000 projects worth over Rs. 2,00,000 crores, of which 45 percent is to be funded through Mission grants, 21 percent through convergence, 21 percent through PPP and rest from other sources.

== Salem metropolitan area ==
The Salem Metropolitan Area is the 16th most populous metropolitan area in India. It is the third most populous metropolitan area in Tamil Nadu, only after Chennai and Coimbatore. The Salem Metropolitan Area consist of the city of Salem and its suburbs in Salem district. Salem Corporation covers 124 km^{2} (48 sq mi) and population is 8,29,267 while Salem metropolitan area covers 799.59 km^{2} (308.72 sq mi) and population is 1,774,122. It consist of Salem City Municipal Corporation and suburban areas spread over the Salem district. New construction in areas under the Salem Local Planning Authority needs their approval to start work.

== Planning authority ==
The Salem Urban Development Authority (SUDA) is nodal planning agency for Salem City Municipal Corporation and it's Suburbs of Indian state of Tamil Nadu. Salem Urban Development Authority administers the Salem Metropolitan Area, spread over an area of 1265.197 km^{2}. And covers the area of Salem City Municipal Corporation, 2 Municipalities, 8 Town Panchayats and 7 Panchayat Unions. Total population of the area covered by Salem Urban Development Authority is 2,463,367.

== Law and enforcement ==
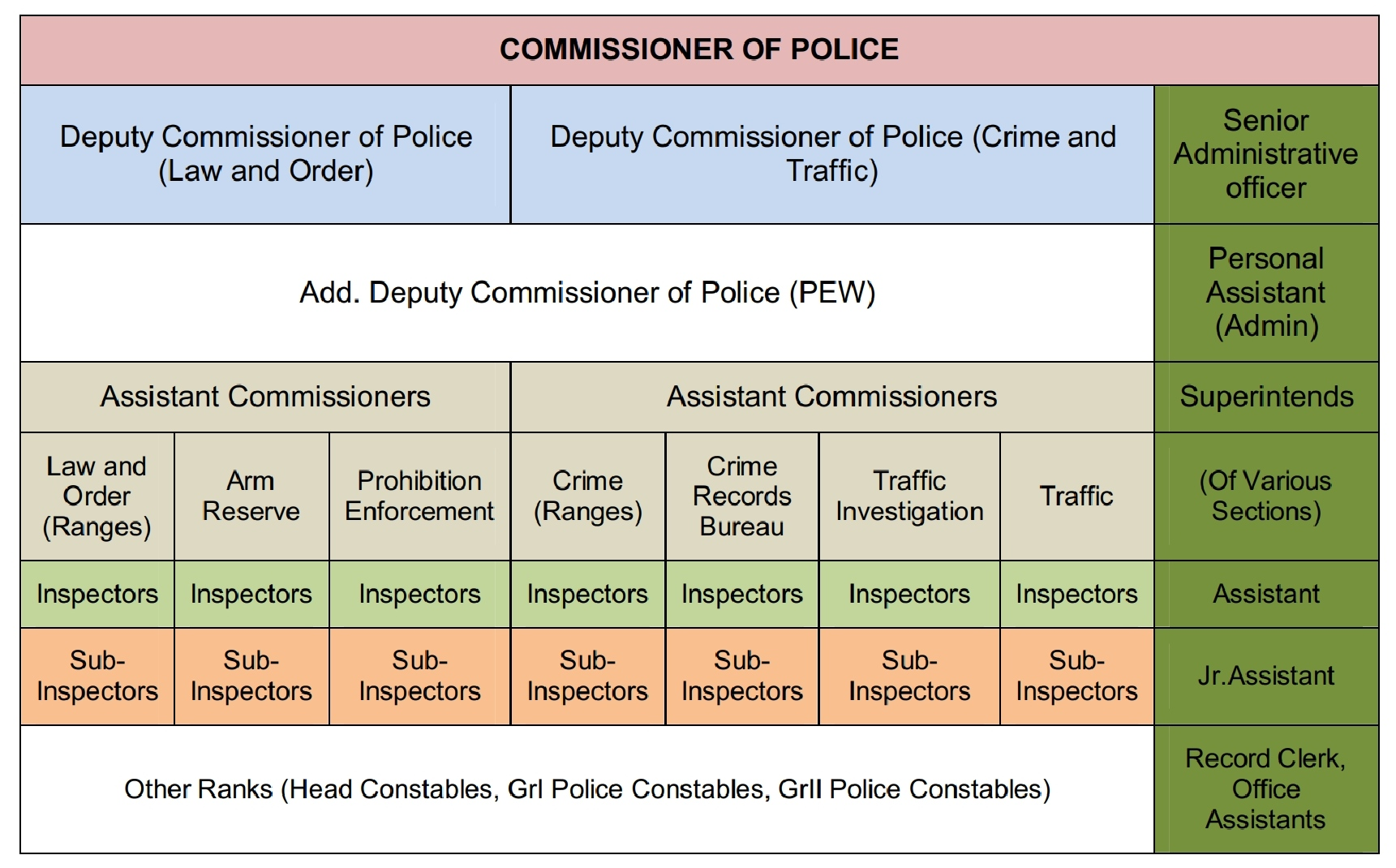

The Salem City Police was formed in 1972 and The Salem Police Commissionerate was formed in 1990 for the major metropolitan cities like Salem, Coimbatore, Madurai and Tiruchirapalli. The jurisdiction of Salem city police commissionerate extends jurisdiction limit to Salem City Municipal Corporation. There are 11 police stations in Salem city, numbered B-1 to B-11. City Police has five wings: traffic wing, traffic investigation wing, prohibition enforcement wing, city crime record bureau, armed reserve, in three zones Salem North, Salem South and Salem West.

=== Wings ===
Wings of Salem city police with address
South range, Salem city
Inspector of Police, Salem Town PS, D.No.426/44, Big Bazaar St, Salem-636 001
North range, Salem city
Inspector of Police, Hasthampatty PS,

D.No.1/1, Kallikadu, Kannankurchi main road, Salem 636007.

West range, Salem city
Inspector of Police, Sooramangalam PS, D.No.1/1, Junction main road, Sooramangalam, Salem 636005
Traffic wing, Salem city
Inspector of Police, (South Traffic) Apsara Theater Near, Shevapet, Salem-2
Traffic investigation wing, Salem city
Inspector of Police, Traffic Investigation Wing, Fairlands Police Station Back Side, Salem City-16
Prohibition enforcement wing, Salem city
ACP (PEW) P.G Nagar, Jahir Ammapalayam, Vennakudi Muniyappan Koil back Side, Salem
City crime record bureau, Salem city
Inspector of Police, CCRB, No.5 Rajaji Kalai Mandram, Bretts road, Salem-7
Armed reserve, Salem city
Inspector of Police, Armed Reserve, Line Medu, Salem-6
