= Mayor of Salem =

Mayor of Salem may refer to:

== United States ==
- Mayor of Salem, Illinois
- Mayor of Salem, Indiana
- Mayor of Salem, Massachusetts
- Mayor of Salem, Missouri
- Mayor of Salem, Ohio
- Mayor of Salem, Oregon
- Mayor of Salem, Utah
- Mayor of Salem, Virginia

== Other ==
- Mayor of Salem, Baden-Württemberg, Germany
- Mayor of Salem, Schleswig-Holstein, Germany
- Mayor of Salem, Tamil Nadu, India
