= 2011 Tamil Nadu local elections =

- 17 and 19 October

All elected seats in the local bodies
- Turnout: 78.80%
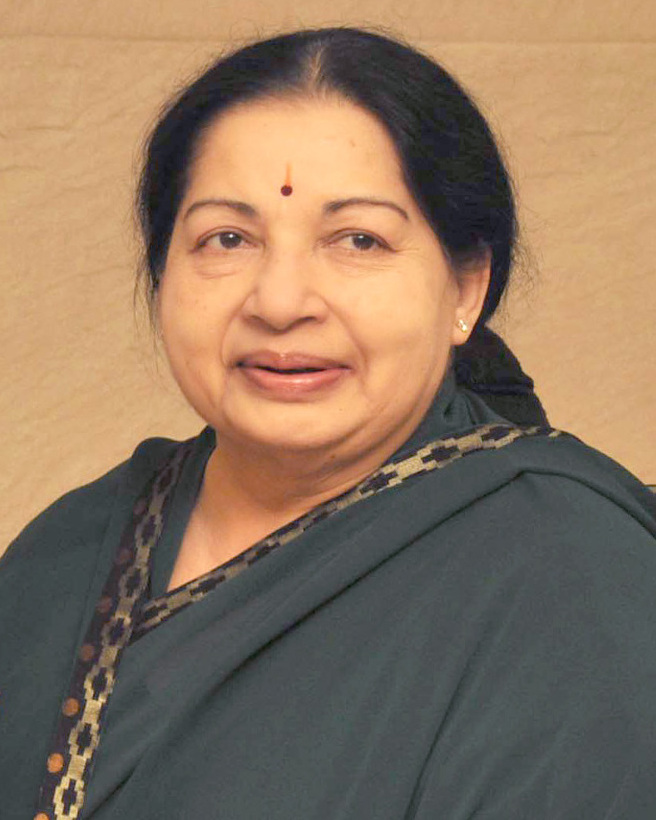

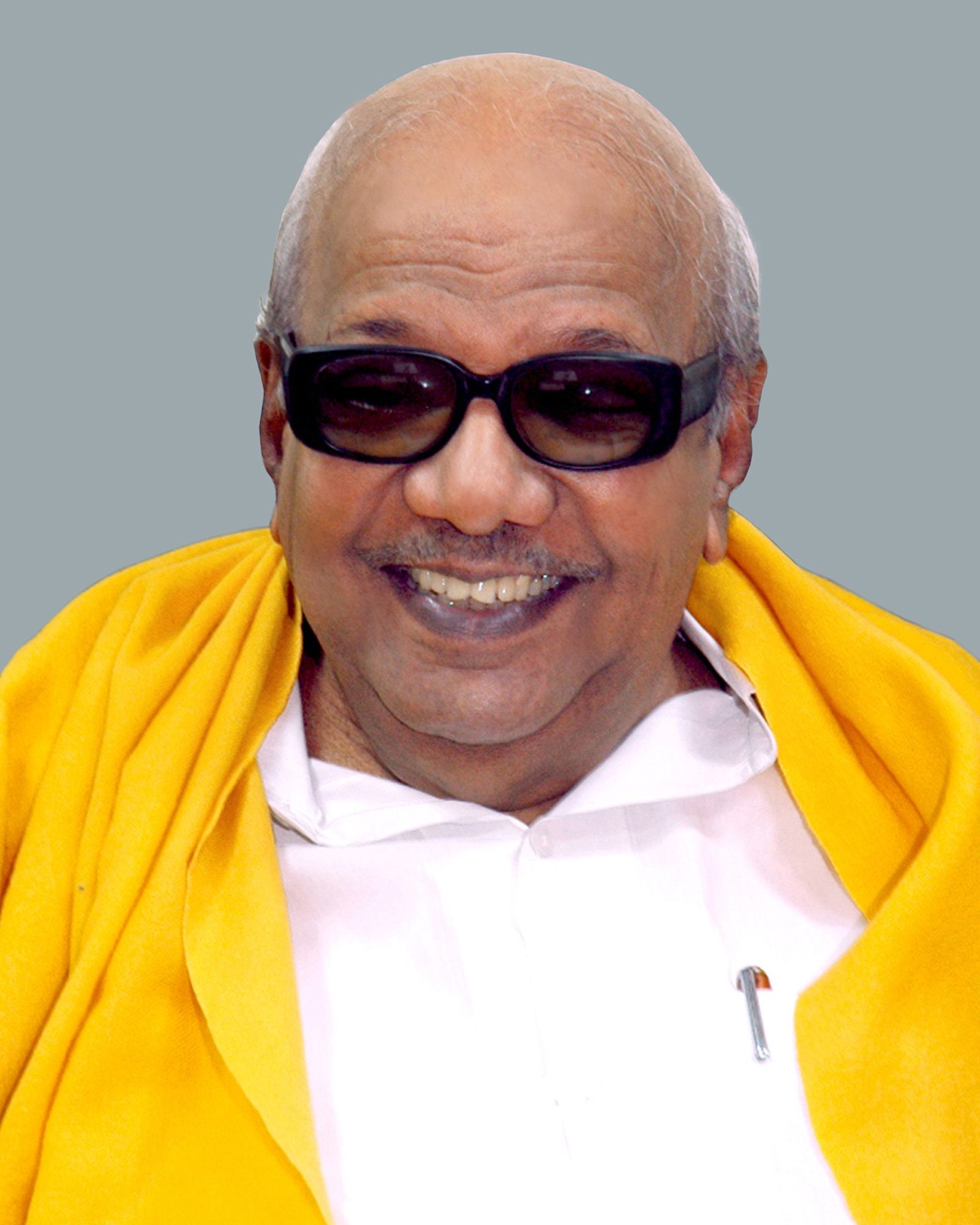
| | First party | Second party |
|---|---|---|
| Leader | J. Jayalalithaa | M. Karunanidhi |
| Party | AIADMK | DMK |
| Alliance | AIADMK Alliance | DPA |
| Leader since | 1989 | 1969 |
| Seats won | 9864 | 4059 |
| Percentage | 39.02% | 26.09% |

Elections were held in Tamil Nadu on 17 and 19 October 2011 for the chairs and council members of all local bodies in the state. To the three levels of urban local bodies: 10 chairs (mayors) and 820 members of municipal corporations; 125 chairs and 3,697 members of municipal councils; and 529 chairs and 8,303 members of town councils. To the three tires of rural local bodies: 12,524 chairs and 99,333 members of village panchayats; 385 chairs and 6,470 members of township panchayats; and 31 chairs and 655 members of district panchayats. The ruling party in the state, the All India Anna Dravida Munnetra Kazhagam (AIADMK), won a landslide victory, securing all of the corporation mayoral posts and a plurality of the other posts.

== Election results ==
AIADMK received 39.02% of the popular vote: 39.24% of the urban vote and 38.69% of the rural vote. DMK received 26.09% of the popular vote: 26.67% of the urban vote and 25.71% of the rural vote. DMDK received 10.11% of the popular vote. Congress received 5.71% of the popular vote. PMK received 3.55% of the popular vote. MDMK received 1.70% of the popular vote. The Communist Party (Marxist) received 1.02% of the popular vote, and the Communist Party 0.71%. Independents received an additional 9.46% of votes.

Elections to village panchayats are non-party contests.

City Municipal Corporation mayoral results
| Corporation | Winner | | Runner-up | |
| Corporation | Candidate | Party | Candidate | Party |
|---|---|---|---|---|
| Chennai | Saidai Sa. Duraisamy | AIADMK | M. Subramaniam | DMK |
| Coimbatore | S. M. Velusamy | AIADMK | N. Karthik | DMK |
| Madurai | V. V. Rajan Chellappa | AIADMK | P. Packianathan | DMK |
| Tiruchirapalli | M. S. R. Jaya | AIADMK | J. Vijaya Jayaraj | DMK |
| Salem | S. Soundappan | AIADMK | S. T. Kalai Amudhan | DMK |
| Tirunelveli | Vijila Sathyanand | AIADMK | S. Amutha | DMK |
| Erode | Mallika Paramasivam | AIADMK | A. Sellaponni Manoharan | DMK |
| Tirupur | A. Visalakshi | AIADMK | K. Selvaraj | DMK |
| Vellore | P. Karthiyayini | AIADMK | R. Rajeswari | DMK |
| Thoothukudi | Sasikala Pushpa | AIADMK | Pon Initha | DMK |

Urban - Corporation Councilor
1. AIADMK (71.3%)
2. DMK (15.8%)
3. IND (6.71%)
4. INC (2.07%)
5. MDMK (1.34%)
6. DMDK (0.98%)
7. BJP (0.49%)
8. CPI (0.49%)
9. PMK (0.24%)
10. CPI(M) (0.37%)
11. Others (0.12%)

Urban Local Body results
| Local Body/Party | Corporation Mayor | Corporation Councilor | Municipal chairman | Municipal Councilor | Town Panchayat chairman | Town Pt. Ward Member |
|---|---|---|---|---|---|---|
| All India Anna Dravida Munnetra Kazhagam | 10 | 585 | 90 | 1,688 | 287 | 2,928 |
| Bharatiya Janata Party | 0 | 4 | 2 | 37 | 13 | 181 |
| Communist Party of India | 0 | 4 | 0 | 10 | 2 | 32 |
| CPI(M) | 0 | 3 | 2 | 20 | 5 | 103 |
| Dravida Munnetra Kazhagam | 0 | 130 | 23 | 964 | 121 | 1,833 |
| Indian National Congress | 0 | 17 | 0 | 165 | 24 | 386 |
| Marumalarchi Dravida Munnetra Kazhagam | 0 | 11 | 1 | 49 | 7 | 82 |
| Pattali Makkal Katchi | 0 | 2 | 0 | 60 | 2 | 109 |
| Desiya Murpokku Dravida Kazhagam | 0 | 8 | 2 | 119 | 3 | 395 |
| Viduthalai Chiruthaigal Katchi | 0 | 2 | 0 | 13 | 0 | 11 |
| Bahujan Samaj Party | 0 | 0 | 0 | 2 | 0 | 2 |
| Rashtriya Janata Dal | 0 | 0 | 0 | 1 | 0 | 7 |
| Puthiya Tamilagam | 0 | 0 | 0 | 0 | 0 | 7 |
| All India Forward Bloc | 0 | 0 | 0 | 0 | 0 | 1 |
| Indhiya Jananayaga Katchi | 0 | 0 | 0 | 2 | 0 | 3 |
| Independent politician | 0 | 55 | 5 | 554 | 65 | 2,179 |
| Others | 0 | 0 | 0 | 12 | 0 | 15 |

Rural Local Body results
| Local Body/Party | District Councilor | Township Councilor |
|---|---|---|
| All India Anna Dravida Munnetra Kazhagam | 602 | 3,893 |
| Bharatiya Janata Party | 2 | 29 |
| Communist Party of India | 4 | 49 |
| CPI(M) | 2 | 25 |
| Dravida Munnetra Kazhagam | 30 | 1,007 |
| Indian National Congress | 5 | 153 |
| Marumalarchi Dravida Munnetra Kazhagam | 2 | 45 |
| Pattali Makkal Katchi | 3 | 229 |
| Desiya Murpokku Dravida Kazhagam | 5 | 339 |
| Viduthalai Chiruthaigal Katchi | 0 | 6 |
| Puthiya Tamilagam | 0 | 9 |
| Rashtriya Janata Dal | 0 | 1 |
| Bahujan Samaj Party | 0 | 1 |
| Independent politician | 0 | 679 |
| Others | 0 | 2 |
