= United Front (India, 1996) =

Coalition government (1996–1998)

- Abbreviation: UF
- Chairman: N. Chandrababu Naidu
- Founded: 1996
- Dissolved: 1998
- Preceded by: National Front
- Headquarters: Andhra Pradesh Bhavan, New Delhi

The United Front was a coalition government of 13 political parties formed in India after the 1996 general elections. It formed two governments in India between 1996 and 1998. N. Chandrababu Naidu of the Telugu Desam Party served as the convener of United Front. The United Front was headquartered at the Andhra Pradesh Bhavan in New Delhi. During its tenure, the government was led by two prime ministers belonging to the Janata Dal – H. D. Deve Gowda and I. K. Gujral.

== Background ==
The Indian general election in 1996 returned a fractured verdict. With the Bharatiya Janata Party emerging as the largest party with 161 of 543 seats, it was invited first to form a government. It accepted the offer, and Atal Bihari Vajpayee was sworn in as the prime minister. However, he was unable to get a majority in parliament, and the government dissolved 13 days later. At a meeting of all the other parties, the Indian National Congress, with a substantial 140 seats, declined to head the government and agreed to extend outside support to the coalition, whereas the Communist Party of India (Marxist) agreed to join the coalition with the Janata Dal at its head, named the United Front.

With the approval of the Congress and CPI(M), the sitting chief minister of Karnataka, H. D. Deve Gowda, was asked to head the coalition as Prime Minister after V. P. Singh and Jyoti Basu declined. His term was from 1 June 1996 to 21 April 1997. The Congress revoked its support for Gowda amidst discontent over communication between the coalition and the Congress. It compromised to support a new government under I. K. Gujral, who served as the prime minister from 21 April 1997 to 19 March 1998. Following the collapse of his government, fresh elections were called, and the United Front lost power. Later, when N. Chandrababu Naidu stepped down as convener of the United Front to extend outside support to the National Democratic Alliance, the coalition disbanded.

== Electoral performance ==
Year	Legislature	Coalition leader	Seats won	Change in seats	Percentage of votes	Vote swing	Outcome	Ref.
1996	11th Lok Sabha	N. Chandrababu Naidu	305 / 543	new	56.31%	new	Government	
1998	12th Lok Sabha	N. Chandrababu Naidu	88 / 543	▼217	20.98%	▼35.33%	Opposition	

== List of prime ministers ==
No.	Portrait	Name	Term in office			Lok Sabha	Cabinet	Constituency	Party
No.	Portrait	Name	Start	End	Tenure	Lok Sabha	Cabinet	Constituency	Party
1		H. D. Deve Gowda	1 June 1996	21 April 1997	324 days	11th	Deve Gowda	Rajya Sabha; Karnataka	Janata Dal
2		Inder Kumar Gujral	21 April 1997	19 March 1998	332 days	11th	Gujral	Rajya Sabha; Bihar	Janata Dal

== Coalition members ==
Party	1996 (Post-poll alliance)	1998 (Pre-poll alliance)	Seat Change
Internal support
Asom Gana Parishad	5	0	▼5
Communist Party of India	12	9	▼3
Communist Party of India (Marxist)	32	32	Steady
Dravida Munnetra Kazhagam	17	6	▼11
Janata Dal	46	6	▼40
Samajwadi Party	17	20	▲3
Tamil Maanila Congress	20	3	▼17
Telugu Desam Party	16	12	▼4
External support
Indian National Congress	140		
Total	305	88	▼217
