= Salem City Police =

Salem City Police சேலம் மாநகர காவல்துறை
- Motto: Truth Alone Triumphs

Jurisdictional structure
- Operations jurisdiction: India
- Legal jurisdiction: Salem, Tamil Nadu
- Governing body: Department of Home, Government of Tamil Nadu

Operational structure
- Overseen by: Department of Home, Prohibition and Excise, Tamil Nadu
- Headquarters: Salem City Police Commissioner Office, Sankari Main Road, Linemedu, Gugai, Salem, Tamil Nadu
- Agency executive: Thiru Praveen Kumar Abhinapu, IPS, Commissioner of Police, Salem city

The Salem City Police (or SCP) is the law enforcement agency in the city of Salem, India. The SCP works under the jurisdiction of the Tamil Nadu Police. Salem City Police has five wings: traffic wing, traffic investigation wing, prohibition enforcement wing, city crime record bureau, armed reserve, in three divisions namely Salem West, Salem South and Salem North.

== History ==
The Salem City Police was formed in 1997 and The Salem Police Commissionerate was formed in 1997for the major metropolitan cities like Salem, Coimbatore, Madurai and Tiruchirapalli. The jurisdiction of Salem city police commissionerate extends jurisdiction limit to Salem City Municipal Corporation. There are 12 police stations in Salem city, numbered B-1 to B-11. City Police has five wings: traffic wing, traffic investigation wing, prohibition enforcement wing, city crime record bureau, armed reserve, in three zones Salem North, Salem South and Salem West. A law was enacted in 1987 to empower the commissionerate with the same powers as the Madras Police. Salem was fully upgraded into a police commissionerate in 1990.

== Jurisdiction ==
The jurisdiction of the Commissionerate of Police extends to the jurisdictional limits of the Salem City Municipal Corporation. Later in 2000 jurisdiction of Salem City Police is extended for the main suburban areas of Salem city like Karuppur police station & Kannankurichi police station, in same way in 2023 Attayampatti and Karipatti police station were annexed with Salem city police.

- Salem City Municipal Corporation
- Ayothiapattinam (Partly)
- Omalur (Partly)
- Veerapandi (Partly)

== Stations ==
There are 17 police stations in Salem city.

=== Salem Town Range ===
- Salem town
- Shevapet
- Government hospital

=== Annadanapatti Range ===
- Annadanapatti
- Kitchipalayam

=== Kondalampatti Range ===
- Kondalampatti
- Steel plant
- Attayampatti

=== Ammapet Range ===
- Ammapet
- Veeranam
- Karipatti

=== Hastampatti Range ===
- Hastampatti
- Kannankurichi
- Alagapuram

=== Suramangalam Range ===
- Pallapatti
- Suramangalam
- Karuppur
