= List of mayors of Salem, Tamil Nadu =

Mayor of Salem
- Incumbent; A. Ramachandran since 4 March 2022
- Type: Municipal corporation
- Status: Active
- Seat: Brett's road, Salem
- Appointer: Electorate of Salem
- Term length: 5 years
- Inaugural holder: G. Soodamani
- Formation: 1996
- Website: Mayor of Salem

The Mayor of Salem is the first citizen of Salem, a metropolitan city in the State of Tamil Nadu, southern India. The mayor is an elected officeholder who, along with 60 councillors of the Salem City Municipal Corporation is the chief administrator of the city.

The mayor is elected directly by the electorate. This was temporarily scrapped in 2006 in favour of an indirect election among the councillors. The process of direct elections was brought back in 2011 on the recommendation of the Election Commission of India.

The office of Mayor of Salem, like all other mayors in Tamil Nadu, was vacant from 25 October 2016 to 4 March 2022 due to repeated delays in holding civic polls in the State. Following the 2022 urban polls, A. Ramachandran of the Dravida Munnetra Kazhagam (DMK) was sworn in as the sixth Mayor of Salem on 4 March 2022.

== List of mayors ==
S.No. (Note: A parenthetical number indicates that the incumbent has previously held office.)	Portrait	Name	Elected Ward	Political Party (Note: This column only names the mayor's party. The corporation the mayor heads may be a complex coalition of several parties and independents; these are not listed here.)	Term of Office			Corporation Election
S.No.	Portrait	Name	Elected Ward	Political Party	From	To	Days in office	Corporation Election
1		G. Soodamani		Dravida Munnetra Kazhagam	25 October 1996 (Note: G. Soodamani was serving as Chairman of Salem Municipality at the time of its upgradation into a Corporation. He automatically became Mayor and was officially elected in the 1996 civic polls.)	2001	1st (4 years, 364 days)	1st
2		R. Suresh Kumar	Directly elected	All India Anna Dravida Munnetra Kazhagam	2001	2006	1st (5 years)	2nd
3		S. Soundappan		All India Anna Dravida Munnetra Kazhagam	2006	27 October 2006	1st (210 days)	2nd
4		J. Rekha Priyadharshini	Directly elected	Dravida Munnetra Kazhagam	28 October 2006	24 October 2011	1st (4 years, 364 days)	3rd
5		S. Soundappan	Directly elected	All India Anna Dravida Munnetra Kazhagam	25 October 2011	24 October 2016	2nd (4 years, 365 days)	4th
Corporation / Mayoralty suspended (25 October 2016 - 2 March 2022)
6		A. Ramachandran	6	Dravida Munnetra Kazhagam	4 March 2022	Incumbent	1st (4 years, 187 days)	5th
