= Usha Srinivasan =

- Born: Usharani S 16 July 1966 (age 59); Chennai, Tamil Nadu, India
- Occupations: Classical dancer, TV artist, teacher
- Years active: 2000–present
- Known for: Kuchipudi
- Parent(s): P. Srinivasan, S. Raajyalaxmi

Usha Srinivasan (born 16 July 1962), more commonly known as Usha, is an Indian film classical dancer specialising in kuchipudi. She was born in a Tamil family. Her father, P. Srinivasan, is a Veda pandit.

== Early life ==
Srinivasan is from Hyderabad, Telangana. She was trained under the kuchipudi dance masters Pasumarthi Sheshubabu, Bhagavatula Sethuram, Uma Ramarao, Chinta Aadinarayana Sharma and Vedantam Radhe Sharma. She was inspired in kuchipudi dance by the legendary Kuchipudi dancers Shobha Naidu and Raja and Radha Reddy. Her mother is also a classical dancer specialised in bharatanatyam.

She did an MA in kuchipudi dance through Potti Sreeramulu Telugu University in Hyderabad. She emerged as an independent performer and choreographer in her twenties and runs a dance school named Sree Raja Rajeswari Arts Academy in Tirupathi. She also works as a kuchipudi lecturer at Tirumal Tirupathi Devasthanam. In 2005, she received a doctorate in Kangundi Kuppam Veedhi Natakam – Kuchipudi Bhagavatham-Tunanathmaka Pariseelana.

== Performing career ==
Srinivasan is an accomplished kuchipudi dancer. She started performing at a young age. Her poised ability to hold difficult balancing poses along with her finely honed sense of rhythm can easily dazzle audiences. In 2006. she performed in the USA organized and conducted by Raaja Raajeswari Arts Academy of Hyderabad.

== Awards ==
- Natyamayuri Award
- State and national level award
- National scholarship for young artists
- Sangeeta Nataka Akademi Bismillah Khan Yuva Puraskar for dedication towards kuchipudi dance

== Dance performance details ==
Place	Year	Organisers	Item	Nature
SaharSa	1987	Inter State NIC		Award Category
Cuddapah	1987	Campaign Programme	Kuchipudi	Awarded Best Dancer
Etah (U.P.)	1991	NIC	Kuchipudi	Awarded Best Dancer
Arunachal Pradesh	1993	NIC AP	Kuchipudi	Certificate Award
Badrachalam	1998	Sri RSD	Kuchipudi	Government programme
Sreekalahasthi	1999	Mahashivarathri		Award for Best Dancer
United States	2006	Raaja Raajeswari Arts Academy	Various	Best performer
AP Bhavan, New Delhi	2010	Govt. of AP	Kuchipudi	Certificate award
