= P. Karthiyayini =

Indian politician

- Political party: Bharatiya Janata Party

P. Karthiyayini is an Indian politician and incumbent Mayor of Vellore Municipal Corporation. She represented All India Anna Dravida Munnetra Kazhagam party. Recently, she joined Bharatiya Janata Party.
