= Visalakshi Nityanand =

Indian singer

Visalakhi Nityanand is an Indian Carnatic music vocalist. She is the daughter and student of Trivandrum R. S. Mani.
