= AP Bhavan =

Coordinates: 28.618°N 77.226°E

Andhra Pradesh Bhavan
- Interactive map of the Andhra Pradesh Bhavan area

General information
- Location: 1, Ashoka Rd, near India Gate, Pataudi House; New Delhi 110 001; Delhi, India
- Current tenants: Nara Chandrababu Naidu; Chief Minister of Andhra Pradesh
- Client: Government of Andhra Pradesh

Andhra Pradesh Bhavan, popularly known as AP Bhavan, is a Government of Andhra Pradesh owned property in New Delhi. It has accommodation, canteen and auditorium in the premises. AP Bhavan is located on a 19.84 acres of land in New Delhi. It has suites for the Governor and the Chief Minister apart from other rooms.

== History ==
AP Bhavan belongs to the state of Andhra Pradesh, when the state was formed by the Government of India. The AP Bhavan came into being in 1956 after merging major portion of Hyderabad state with erstwhile Andhra state on linguistics basis.
