= Kondalampatti =

- city
- Location in Salem, India Kondalampatti (Tamil Nadu) Kondalampatti (India)
- Coordinates: 11.6332°N 78.1269°E
- Country: India
- State: Tamil Nadu
- District: Salem

Population (2011)
  - Total: 20,000

Languages
  - Official: Tamil
- Time zone: UTC+5:30 (IST)
- PIN: 636010
- Telephone code: +91-427

Kondalampatti is a Zonal Region in Salem City consisting of 15 wards in the Indian state of Tamil Nadu. As of 2022 Thiru. N. Palanisamy is the councillor from this region.

== Demographics ==
=== Population ===
As of 2011 India census, Kondalampatti had a population of 20,000. Males constitute 50% of the population and females 50%. Kondalampatti has an average literacy rate of 52%, lower than the national average of 59.5%: male literacy is 61%, and female literacy is 42%. In Kondalampatti, 13% of the population is under 6 years of age. Salem Corporation consists of 60 wards categorized under 4 Zonal Offices namely Suramangalam Zonal, Hasthampatty Zonal, Ammapet Zonal, Kondalampatty Zonal.

=== Languages ===
Tamil is the official language. Kondalampatty consists of considerable population speaking Kannada. The Kannada spoken here is not pure, as it is spoken in Tamil slang.

== Economy ==
Major revenue is generated from the silk yarn trading, silk sarees manufacturing and trading. Major trading partner towns are Kanchipuram, Arni and Dharmawaram.

== Education ==
=== Colleges ===
- Salem Sowdeswari College
- Government law college, Salem

=== Schools ===
  - Government Boys Higher secondary school.
  - Salem Sri Sowdeswari Matric Hr.sec.school.
  - Sri Vidhya Bharathi Matric Hr.sec.school.
  - Sri Vidhya Mandir CBSE school.
