= S. Soundappan =

Indian politician

- எஸ். சவுண்டப்பன்

Mayor of Salem
- In office 2006 – 27 October 2006
- Preceded by: Suresh Kumar
- Succeeded by: J. Rekha Priyadharshini
- In office 25 October 2011 – 24 October 2016
- Deputy: M. Natesan
- Preceded by: J. Rekha Priyadharshini
- Succeeded by: A. Ramachandran

Personal details
- Born: c.1951 Salem, Tamil Nadu
- Citizenship: Indian
- Party: All India Anna Dravida Munnetra Kazhagam
- Awards: Kalaimamani

S. Soundappan is an Indian politician who served twice as the Mayor of Salem. As a cadre of All India Anna Dravida Munnetra Kazhagam party, he previously served as Deputy mayor of the same Salem corporation from 2001 to 2006. He won the Kalaimamani award for his excellence in service in the field of "Theater and Drama".
