= A. Visalakshi =

Mayor of Tiruppur Municipal Corporation

A. Visalakshi is an Indian politician and former Mayor of Tiruppur Municipal Corporation. She represents All India Anna Dravida Munnetra Kazhagam party and also serves as the party women's wing deputy secretary of Tiruppur.
