= Hastampatti =

- Metropolitan Area
- Location in Salem, India Hastampatti (Tamil Nadu) Hastampatti (India)
- Coordinates: 11.6816°N 78.1537°E
- District: Salem District
- Assembly constituency: Salem West & Salem North
- Lok Shaba constituency: Salem

Government
  - Type: Zone of Salem City Municipal Corporation
- Elevation: 288 m (945 ft)

Languages
  - Official: Tamil
- Time zone: UTC+5:30
- Telephone code: +91, 0427

Hasthampatti is a locality in Salem city in Tamil Nadu state, India. Hastampatti is one of the zones in Salem City Municipal Corporation, and part of Salem Metropolitan Area .

Hasthampatti Pin code is 636007 and postal head office is Salem North.

== Areas nearby Hastampatti ==
Alagapuram, Arun Nagar, Rajarajan Nagar, MDS Nagar, Ponnandigounder Nagar, Subbarayan Layout are the nearby localities to Hasthampatti.

== Polling station nearby Hastampatti ==
1. Cluny Matriculation School, Pudur Extension.
2. CSI Hober School Hasthampatty Salem-636007.
3. CSI Hober School Hasthampatty Salem-636007.
4. CSI Hober School Hasthampatty Salem-636007.
5. CSI Polytechnic College Yercaud Main Road Salem-636007.

== Health center nearby Hastampatti ==
1. Shanmuga Hospital Cancer Ins, 24, Saradha College Road, Shanmuga Hospital Complex.
2. Salem Gopi Hospital, 23b, Ramakrishna Road.
3. Sims Chellum Hospital, 31/3C, Vijayaragavachariyar Road, off Gandhi Road.

== Educational institutions nearby Hastampatti ==
- World Tamil classical University
- CSI polytechnical college.
- Knowledge eduventure.
- VSR catering technology and management.
- Vasavi primary school.
- CSC computer education.
- NSEIT LIMITED.
- LEF Eden Garden Matriculation School.
- Kidzee Salem.
- The Indian Public Kids School.

== See also ==
- Salem metro
- Salem metropolitan area (India)
- Alagapuram (Salem)
- Tamilnadu State Transport corporation Salem
- Local bodies in Salem
