= Madhya Pradesh =

State in central India

- State
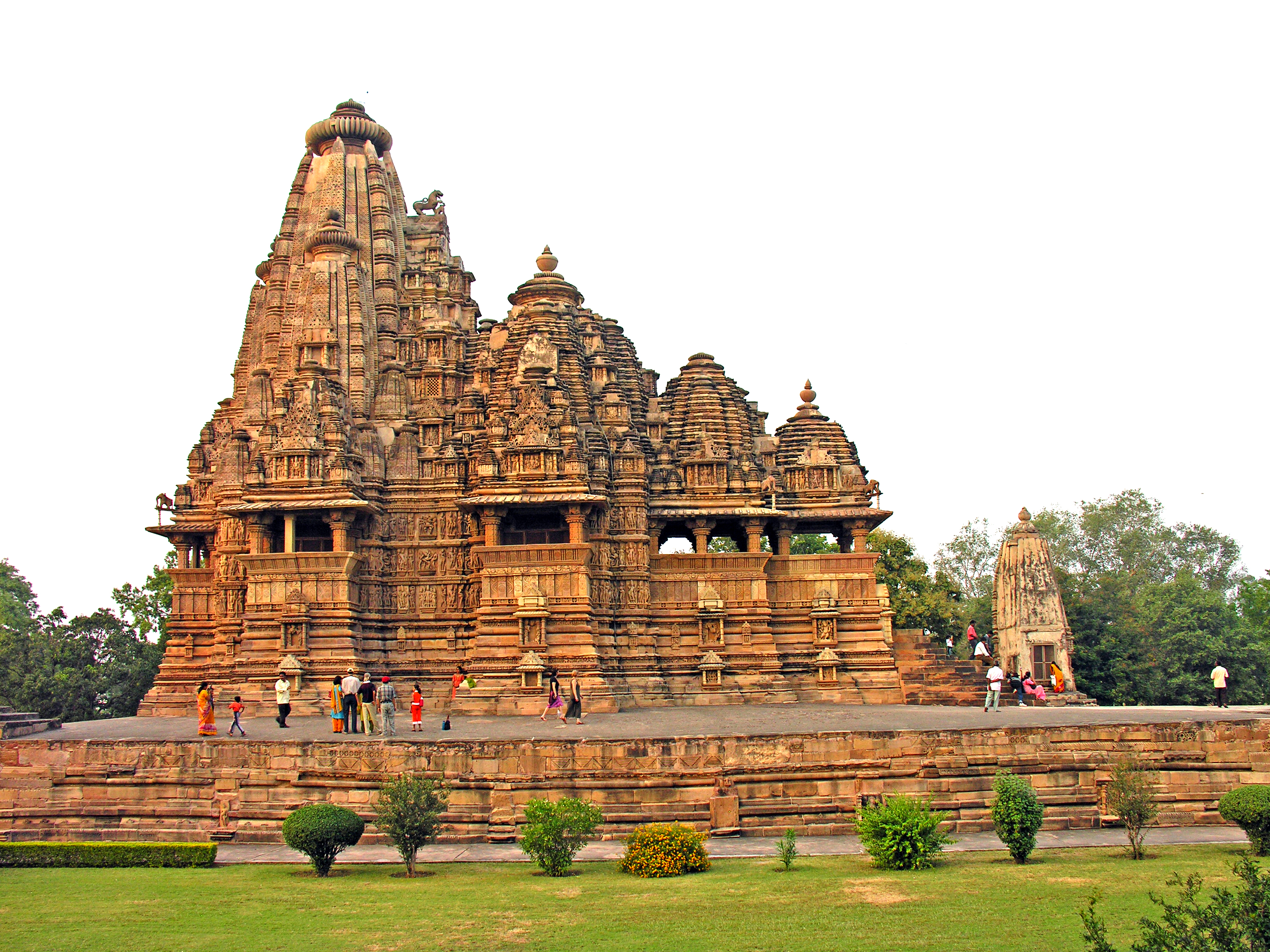
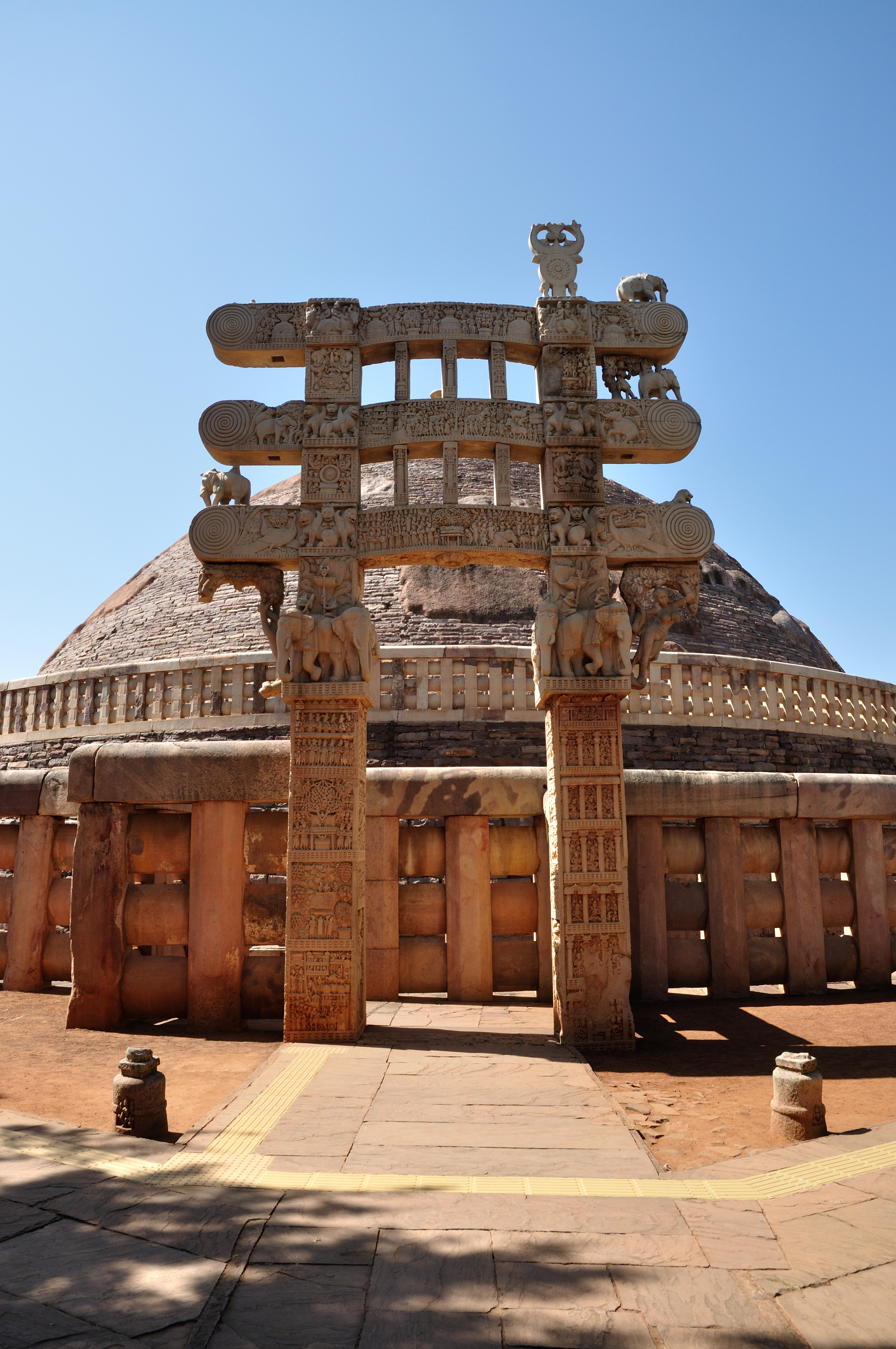
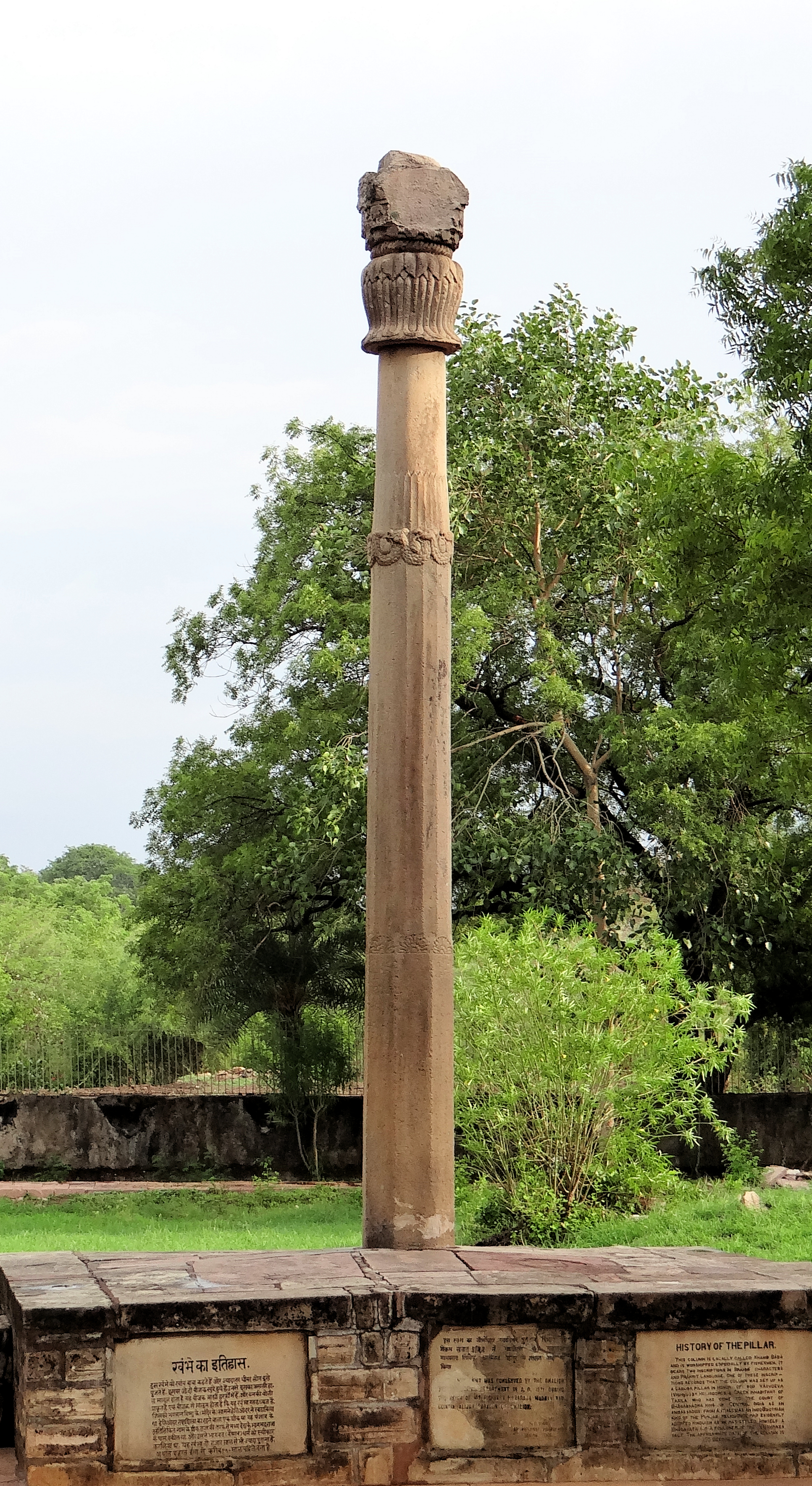
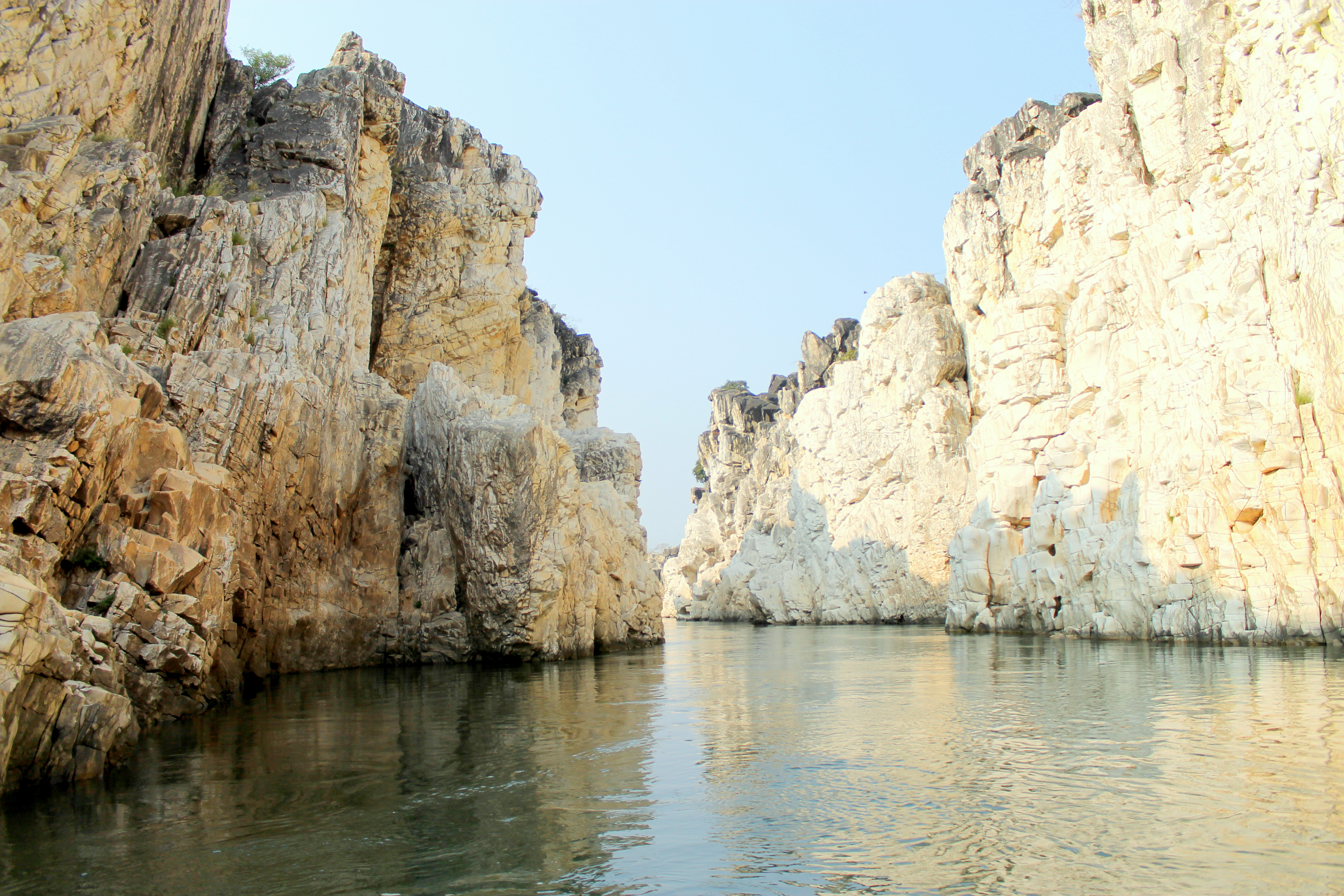
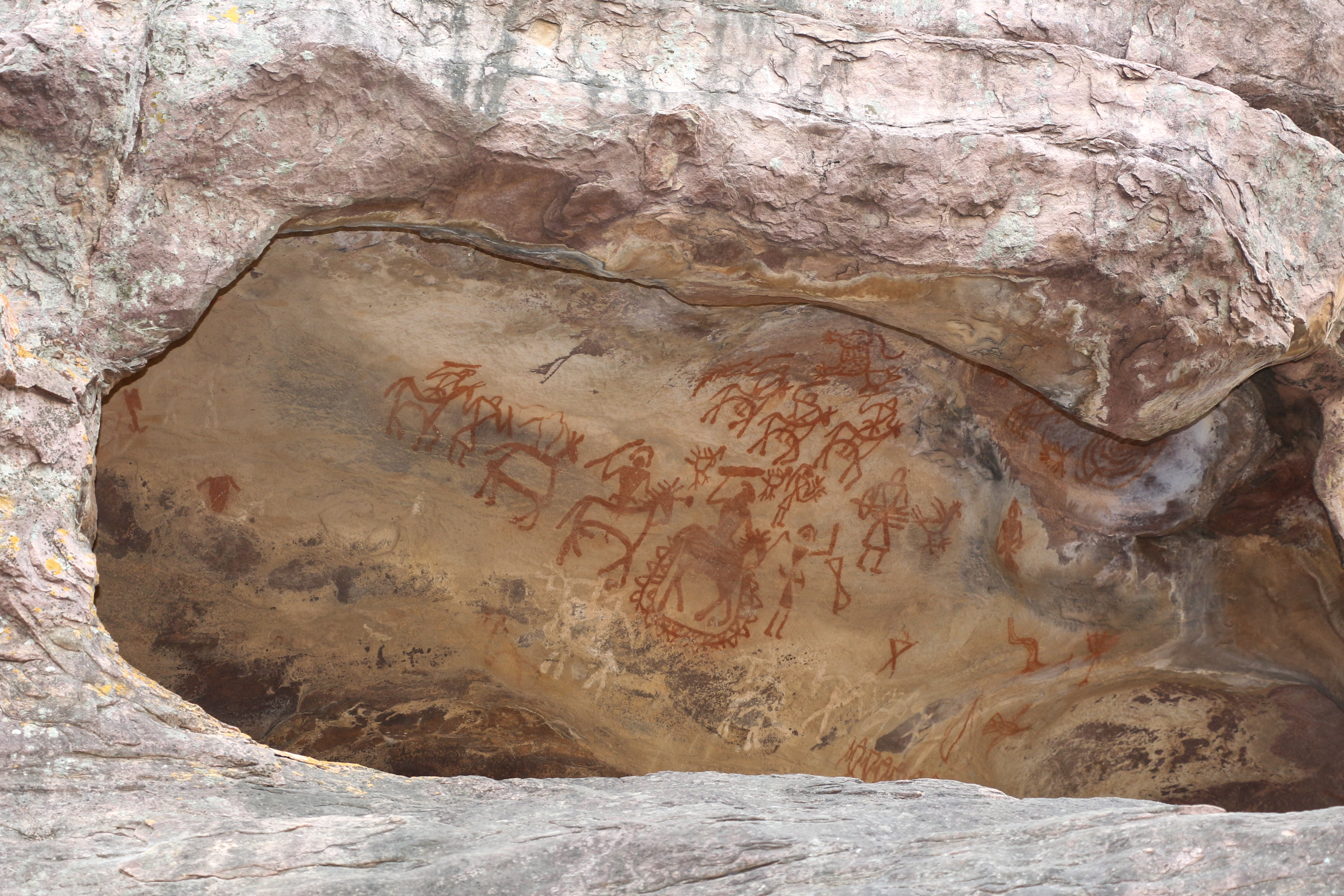
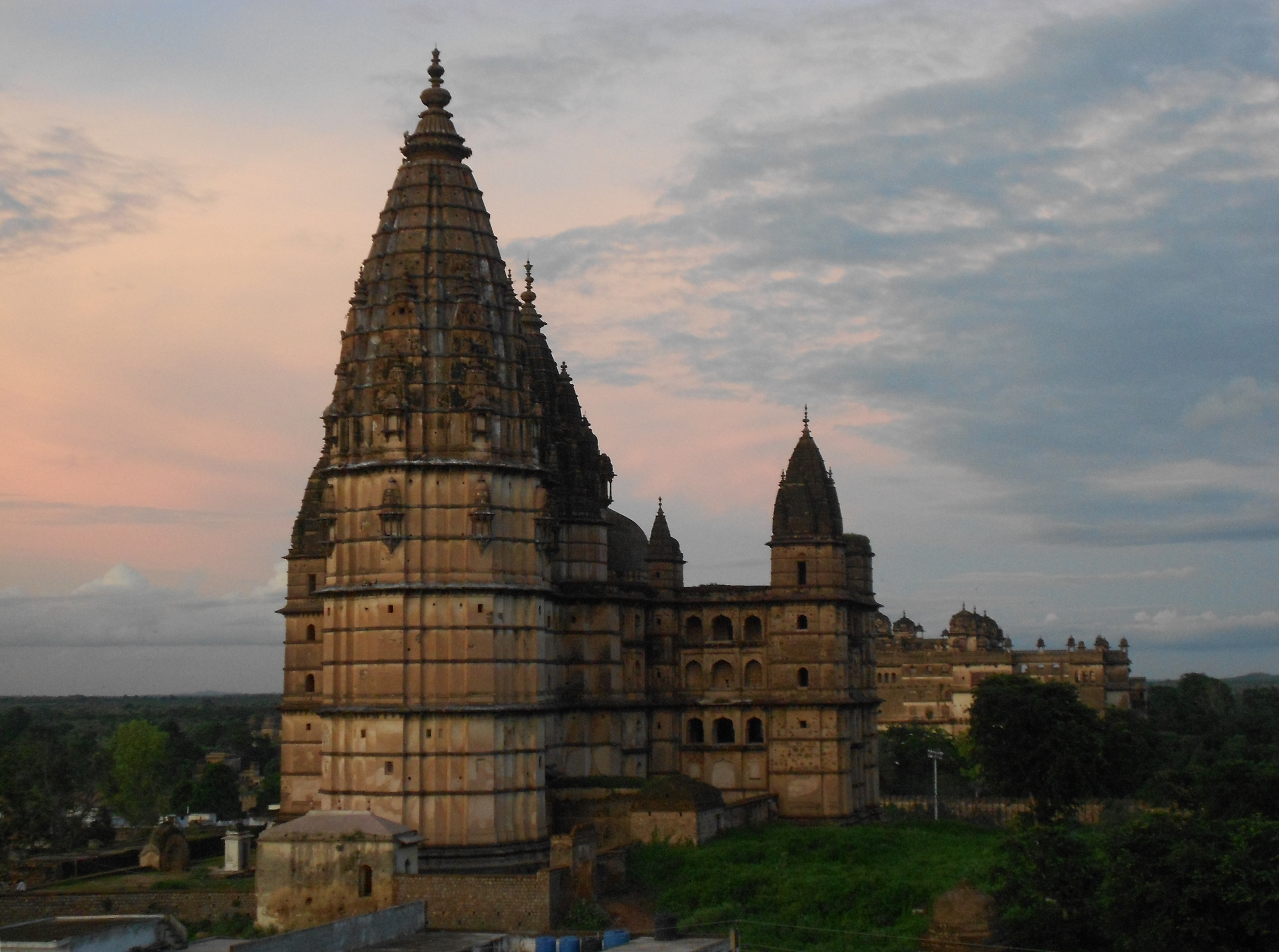
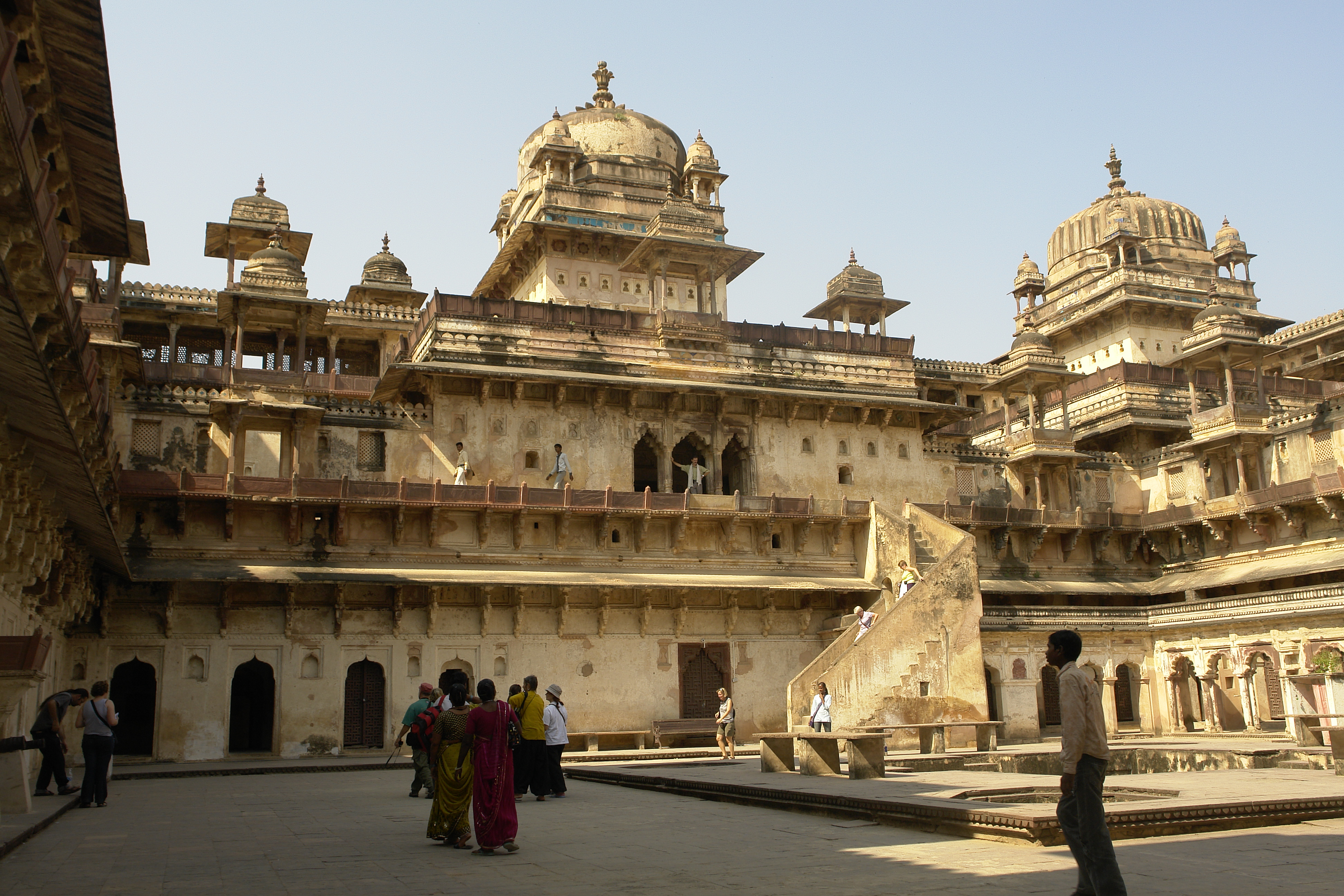
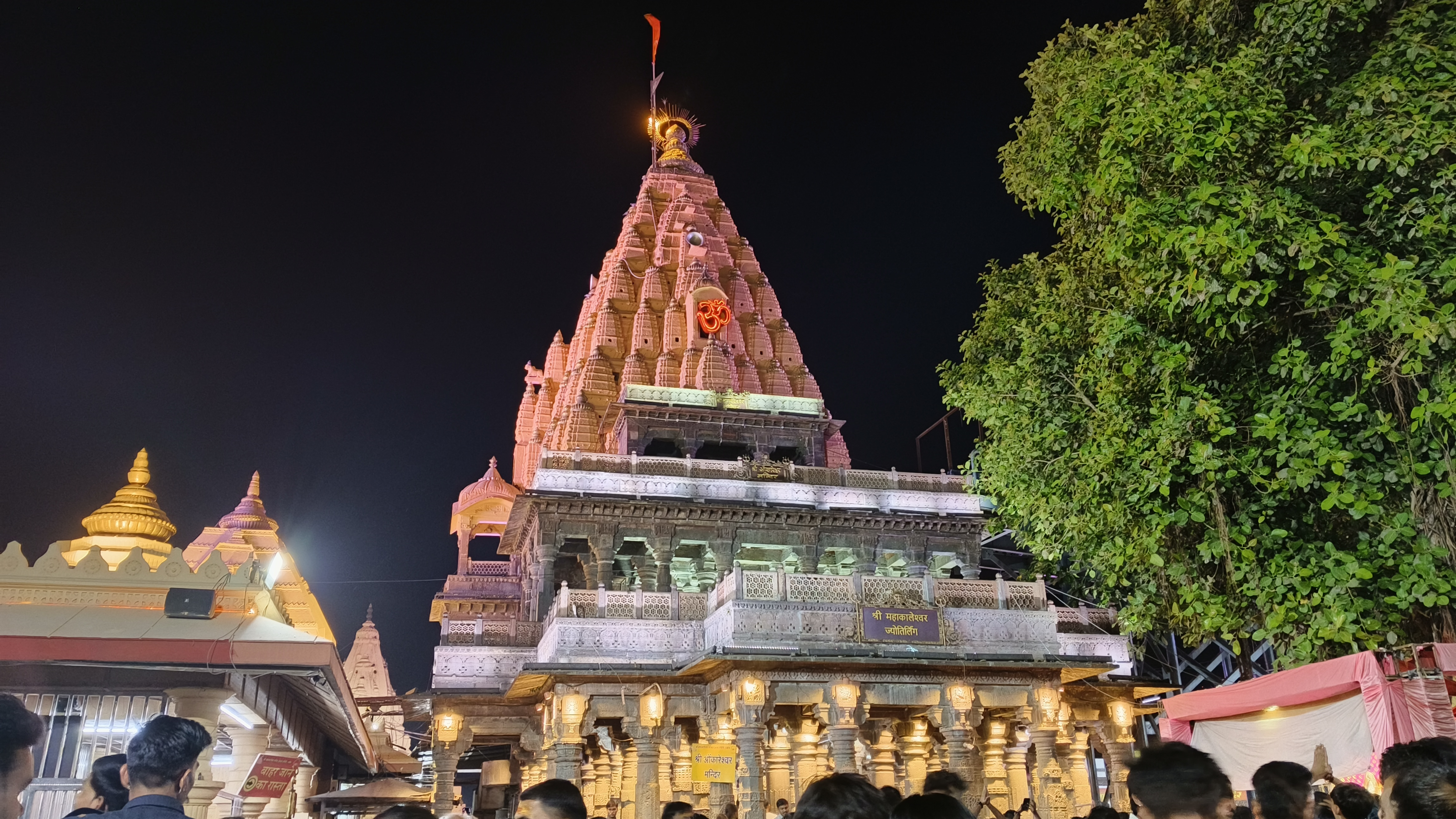
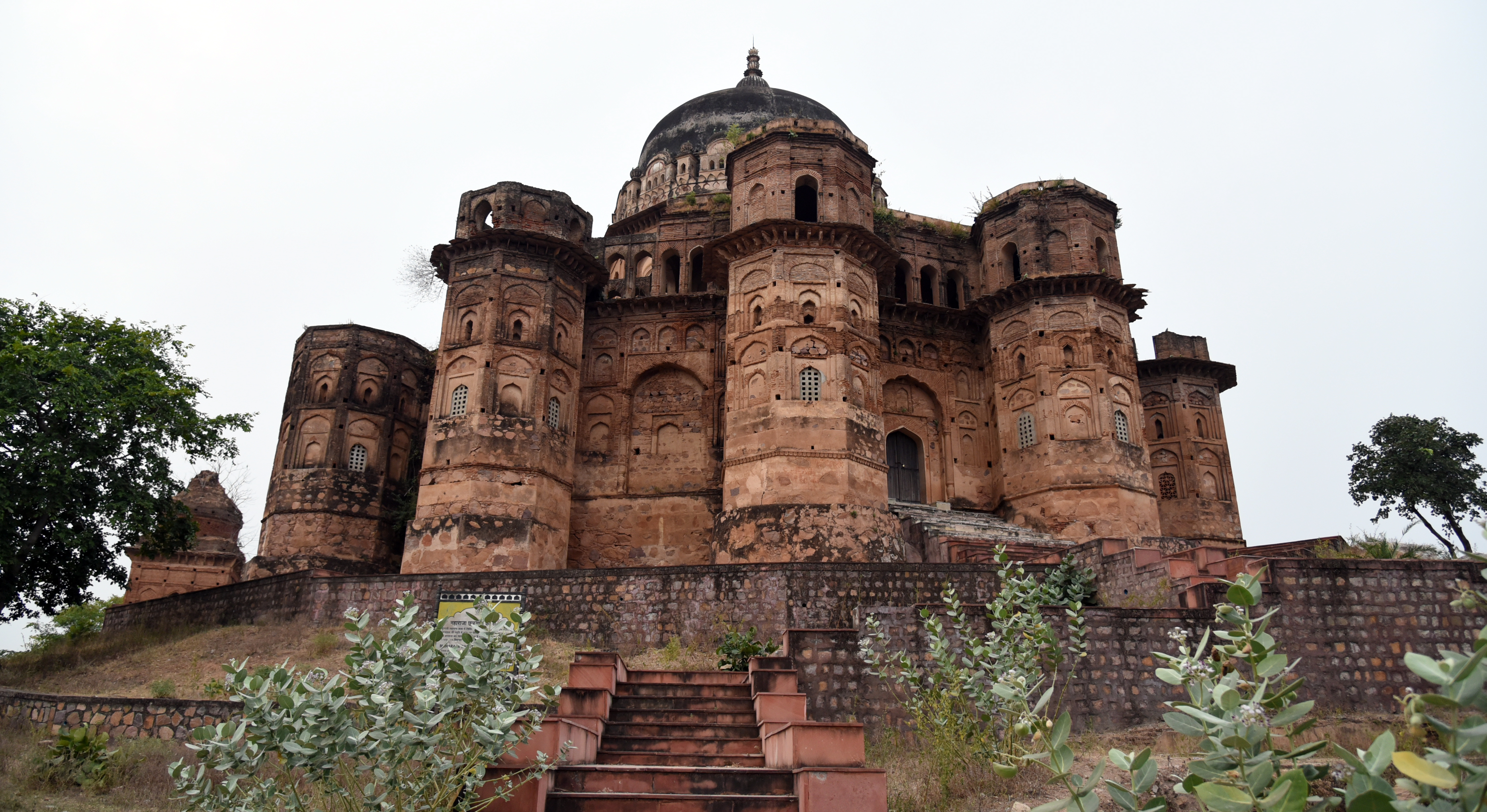
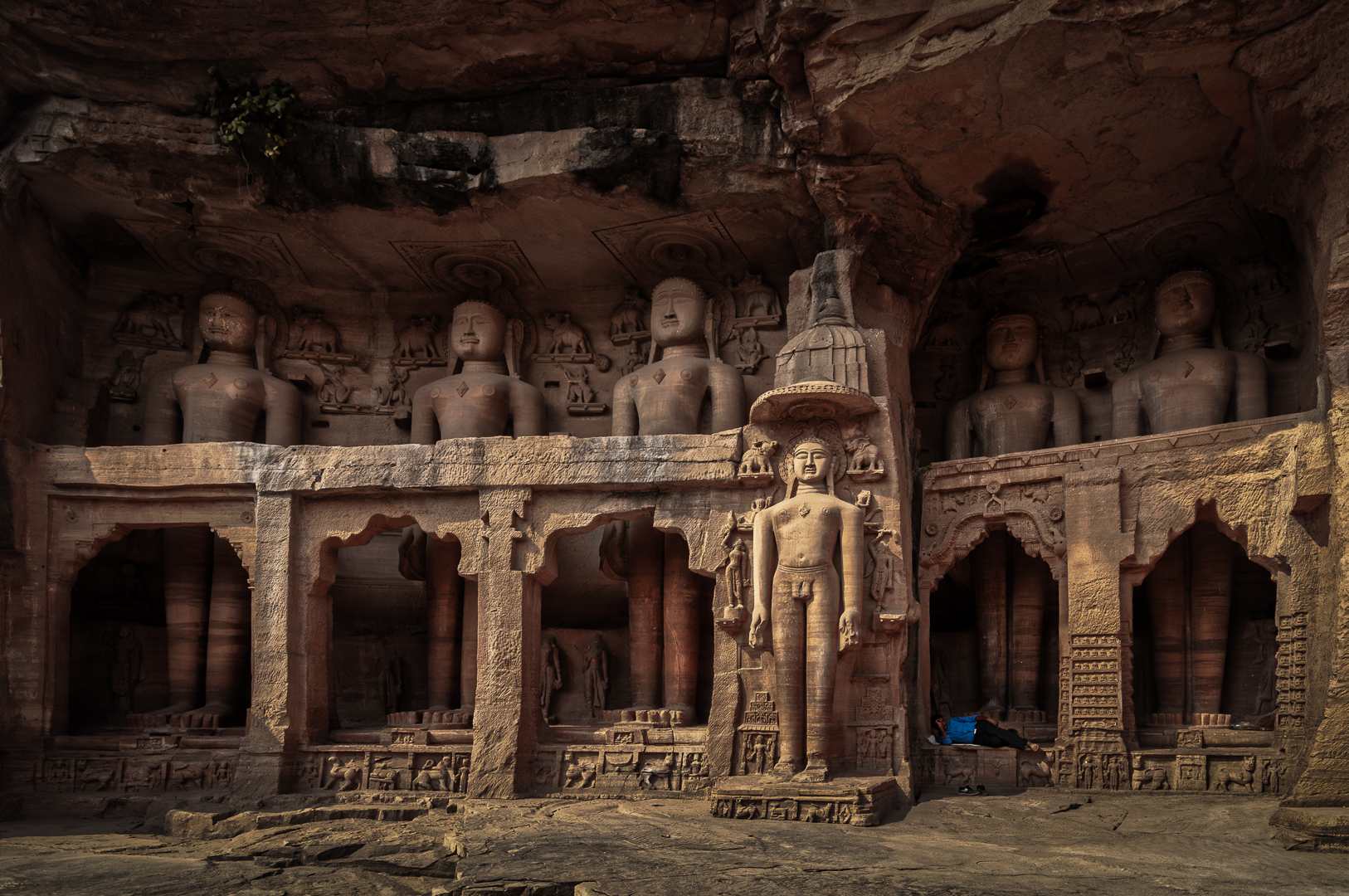
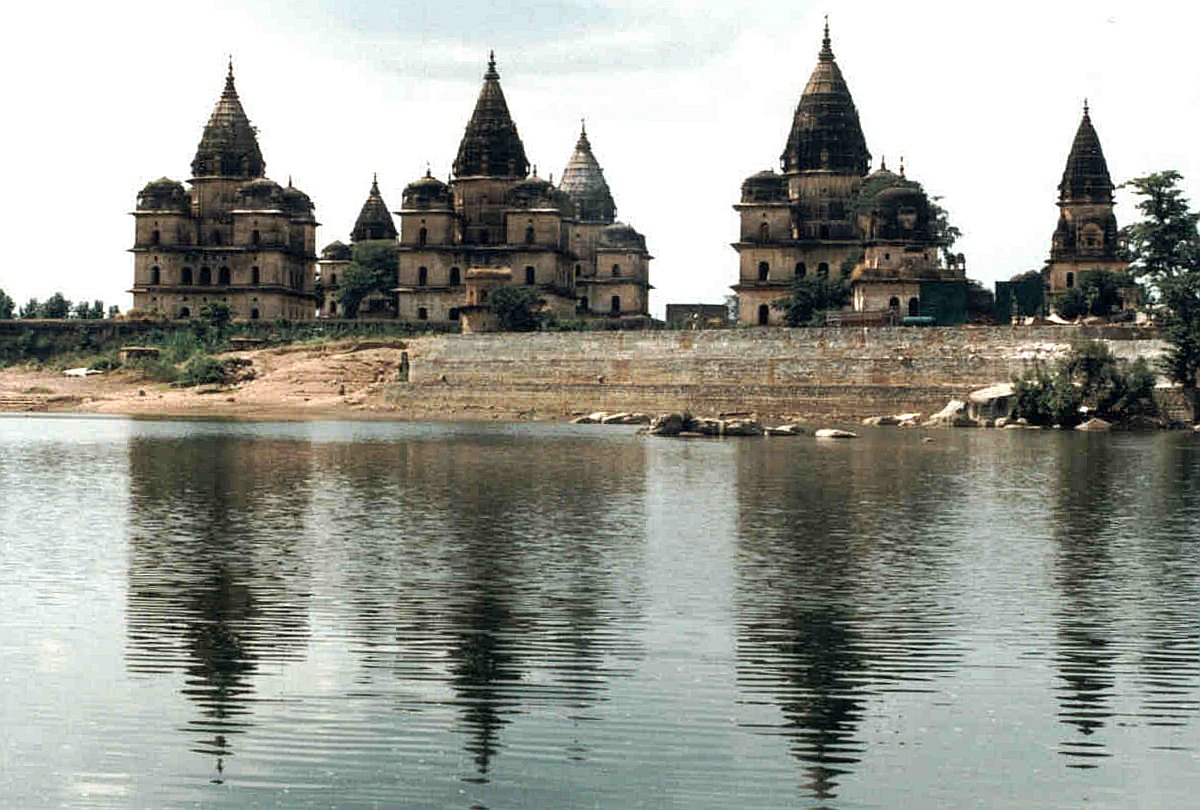
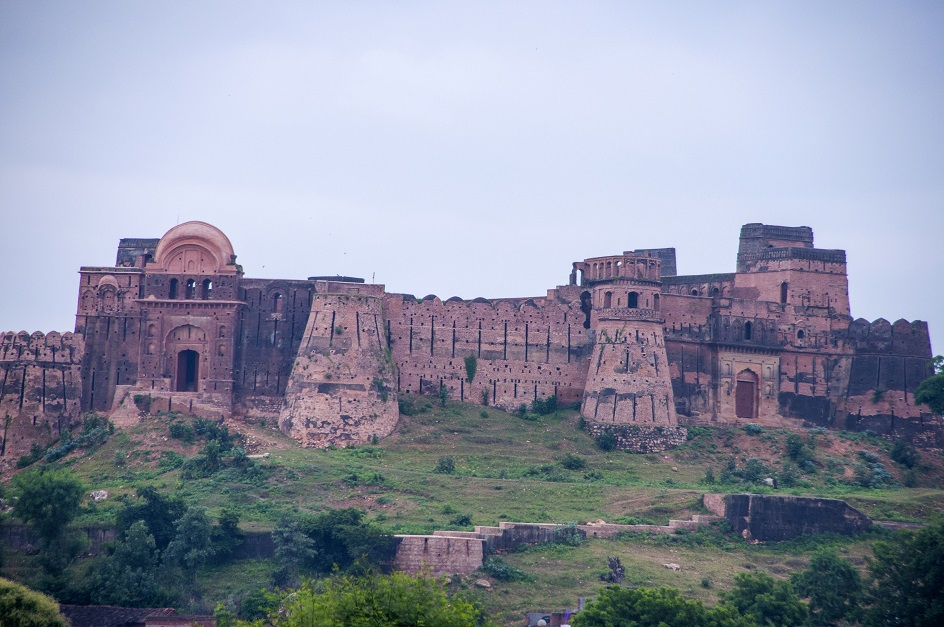
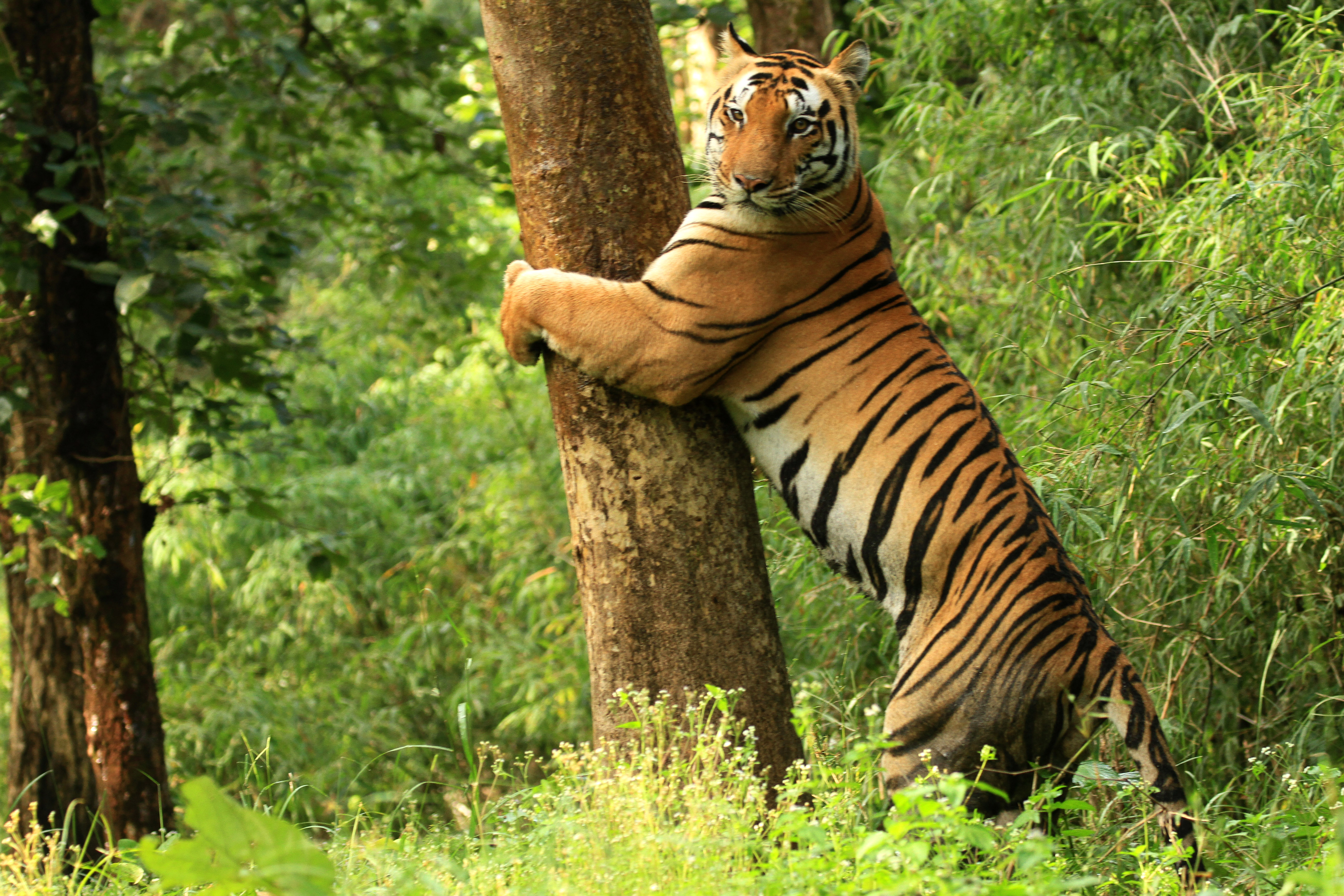
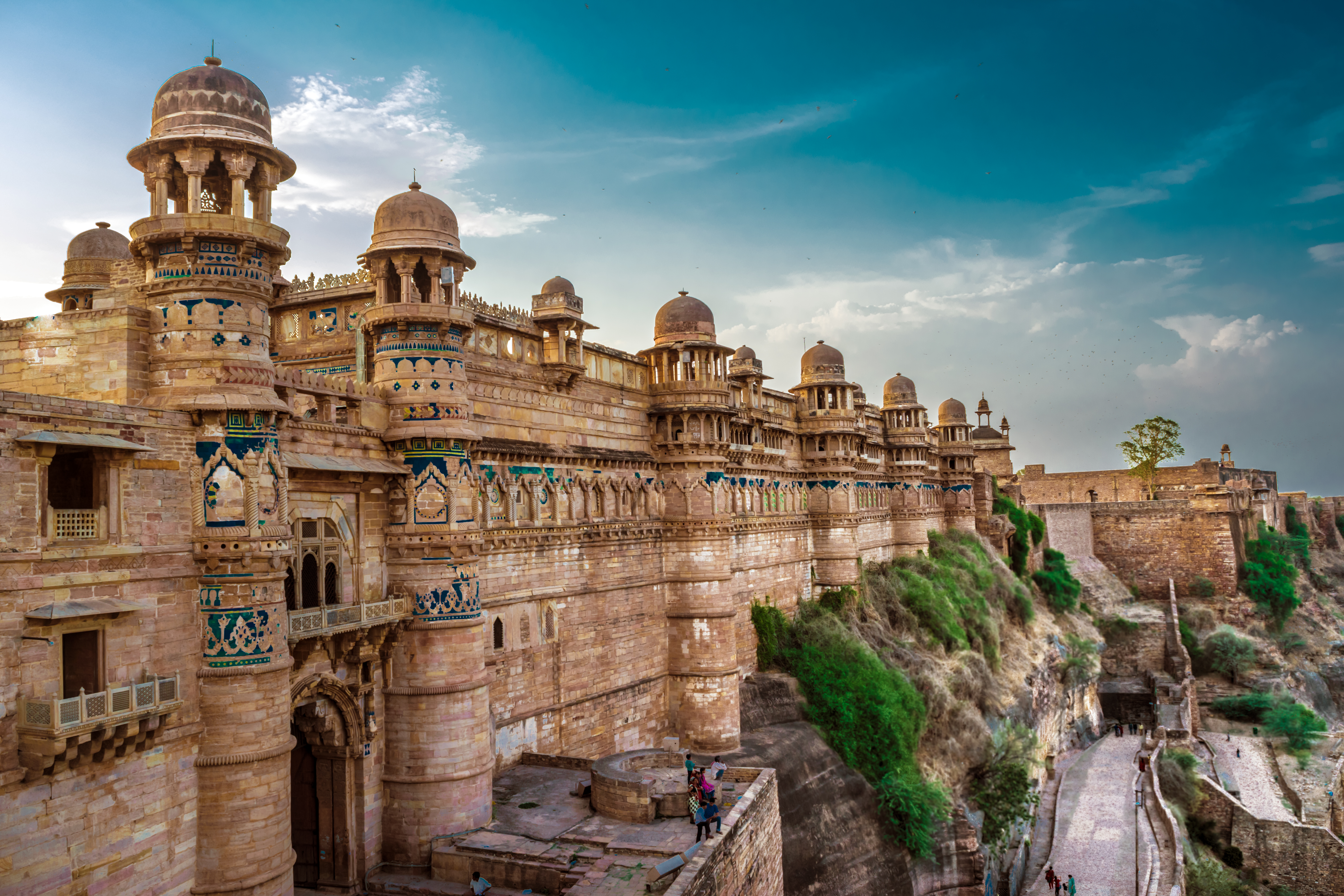
- Khajuraho Group of Monuments Sanchi Stupa Heliodorus Pillar Marble Rocks along the Narmada River Bhimbetka Rock Shelters Chaturbhuj Temple Jahangir Mahal Mahakaleshwar Jyotirlinga Palace of Maharaja Chhatrasal Gopachal Jain Colossi Chhatris on the banks of the Betwa River Gulganj Fort Kanha Tiger Reserve Gwalior Fort

- Emblem of Madhya Pradesh
- Etymology: "Central Province"
- Nickname: "Heart of India"
- Motto: Satyameva Jayate (Sanskrit) "Truth alone triumphs"
- Anthem: Mera Madhya Pradesh (Hindi) "My Madhya Pradesh"
- Location of Madhya Pradesh in India
- Country: India
- Region: Central India
- Previously was: Central Provinces and Berar & Madhya Pradesh (1956–2000)
- Formation: 1 November 1956
- Capital: Bhopal
- Largest city: Indore
- Districts: 55 (10 divisions)

Government
  - Body: Government of Madhya Pradesh
  - Governor: Mangubhai C. Patel
  - Chief Minister: Mohan Yadav (BJP)
  - Deputy Chief Minister: Jagdish Devda; Rajendra Shukla (BJP)

Area
  - Total: 308,252 km^{2} (119,017 sq mi)
  - Rank: 2nd

Dimensions
  - Length: 605 km (376 mi)
  - Width: 870 km (540 mi)
- Elevation: 400 m (1,300 ft)
- Highest elevation (Dhupgarh): 1,352 m (4,436 ft)
- Lowest elevation (Chambal Valley): 90 m (300 ft)

Population (2011)
  - Total: ▲72,597,565
  - Rank: 5th
  - Density: 240/km^{2} (620/sq mi)
  - Urban: 27.63%
  - Rural: 72.37%
- Demonym: Madhya Pradeshis

Language
  - Official: Hindi
  - Official script: Devanagari script

GDP
  - Total (2026–27): ▲₹18.48 trillion (US$200 billion)
  - Rank: 10th
  - Per capita: ₹216,523 (US$2,313) (2026–27) (25th)
- Time zone: UTC+05:30 (IST)
- ISO 3166 code: IN-MP
- Vehicle registration: MP
- HDI (2023): ▲0.692 Medium (32nd)
- Literacy (2024): 75.2% (34th)
- Sex ratio (2011): 970♀/1000 ♂ (15th)
- Website: mp.gov.in
- Symbols of Madhya Pradesh
- Bird: Indian paradise flycatcher
- Fish: Mahseer
- Flower: White lily
- Fruit: Mango
- Mammal: Barasingha
- Tree: Banyan Tree
- State highway mark
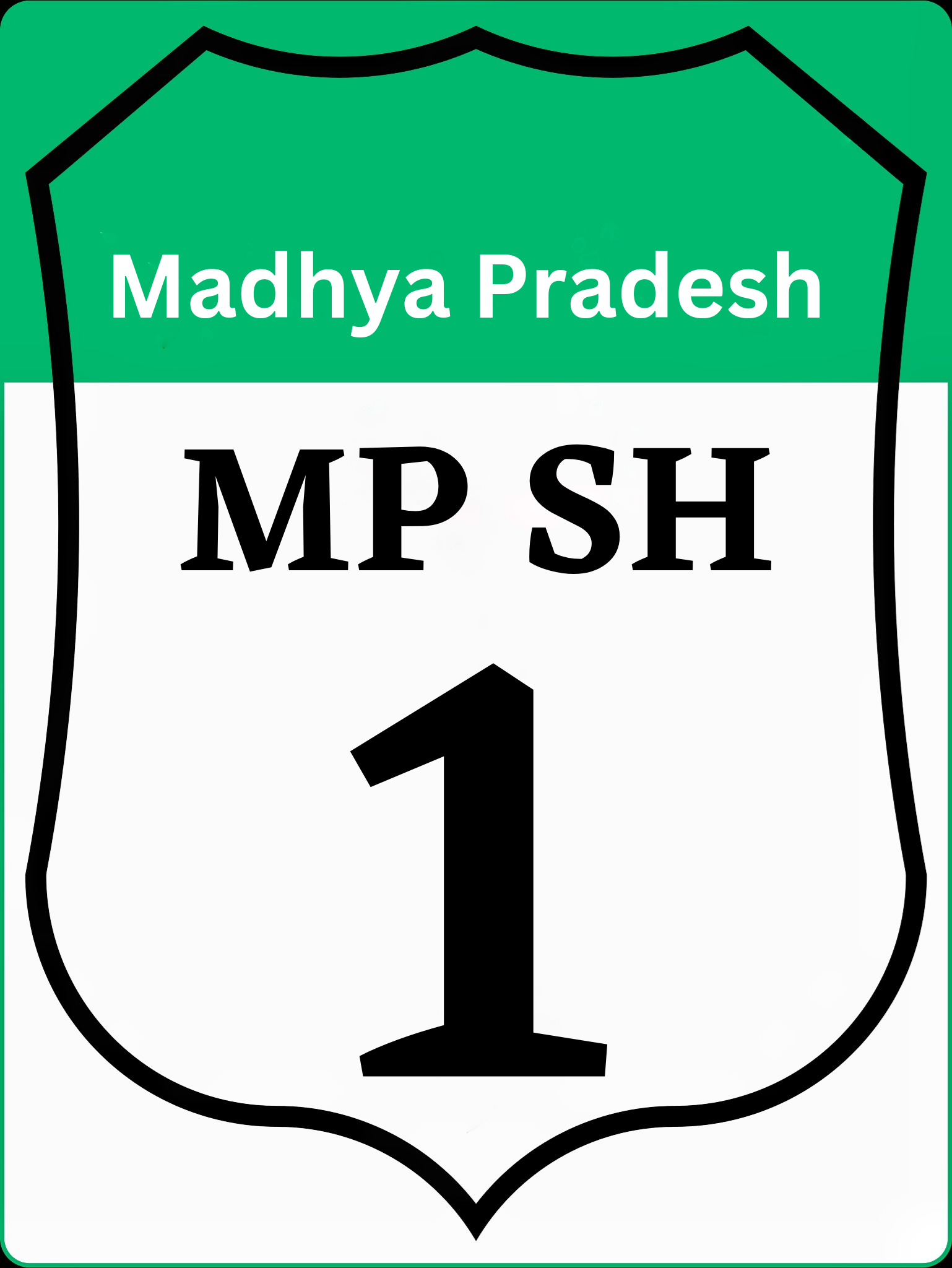
- State highway of Madhya Pradesh; MP SH1 – MP SH53
- List of Indian state symbols

Madhya Pradesh (/ˌmɑːdjə prəˈdɛʃ/; Hindi: [ˈmədʱjə pɾəˈdeːʃ]; lit. 'Central Province') is a state in central India. Its capital is Bhopal. Other major cities include Indore, Gwalior, Jabalpur, Chhindwara and Sagar. Madhya Pradesh is the second largest Indian state by area and the fifth largest state by population with over 72 million residents. It borders the states of Rajasthan to the northwest, Uttar Pradesh to the northeast, Chhattisgarh to the east, Maharashtra to the south and Gujarat to the west.

The area covered by the present-day Madhya Pradesh includes the area of the ancient Avanti Mahajanapada, whose capital Ujjain (also known as Avantika) arose as a major city during the second wave of Indian urbanisation in the sixth century BCE. Subsequently, the region was ruled by the major dynasties of India. The Maratha Empire dominated the majority of the 18th century. After the Third Anglo-Maratha War in the 19th century, the region was divided into several princely states under the British and incorporated into Central Provinces and Berar and the Central India Agency. After India's independence, the Central Provinces and Berar was renamed as Madhya Pradesh with Nagpur as its capital. This state included the southern parts of the present-day Madhya Pradesh and northeastern portion of today's Maharashtra.

Madhya Bharat with Gwalior as its capital (1948)

Meanwhile Central India Agency was renamed as Madhya Bharat which included parts of present day north western Madhya Pradesh and became a separate state with Gwalior as its capital. In 1956, these states were reorganised and combined with the states of Vindhya Pradesh and Bhopal to form the new Madhya Pradesh state. The Marathi-speaking Vidarbha region was merged with the Bombay State. This state was the largest in India by area until 2000, when its southeastern Chhattisgarh region was designated a separate state.

Madhya Pradesh's economy is the 10th-largest in India, with a gross state domestic product (GSDP) of ₹9.17 trillion (US$98 billion) and has the country's 26th highest per-capita income of ₹109,372 (US$1272). Madhya Pradesh ranks 23rd among Indian states in human development index. Rich in mineral resources, Madhya Pradesh has the largest reserves of diamond and copper in India. 25.14% of its area is under forest cover. Madhya Pradesh has posted country’s highest agricultural growth rate which had averaged above 20 per cent over last four years. The state leads the country in production of pulses, oilseeds, soya bean, gram, pea, garlic, guava, and medicinal and aromatic herbs. Horticulture is being promoted as part of the state's Annual Action Plan.

Its tourism industry has seen considerable growth, with the state topping the National Tourism Awards in 2010–11. In recent years, the state's GDP growth has been above the national average. In 2019–20, state's GSDP was recorded at 9.07%.

== Etymology ==
Madhya Pradesh name comes from the Sanskrit words madhya (middle, central) and pradeś (state, province). It literally means "Central province".

== History ==
Isolated remains of Homo erectus found in Hathnora in the Narmada Valley indicate that Madhya Pradesh might have been inhabited in the Middle Pleistocene era. Painted pottery, dated to the later Mesolithic period has been found in the Bhimbetka rock shelters. Chalcolithic sites belonging to the Kayatha culture (2100–1800 BCE) and Malwa culture (1700–1500 BCE) have been discovered in the western part of the state. Madhya Pradesh is also the world's ninth-most populous subnational entity.

The city of Ujjain arose as a major centre in the region, during the second wave of Indian urbanisation in the sixth century BCE. It has served as the capital of the Avanti kingdom. Other kingdoms mentioned in ancient epics – Malava, Karusha, Dasarna and Nishada – have also been identified with parts of Madhya Pradesh.

Chandragupta Maurya conquered northern India around 320 BCE, establishing the Mauryan Empire, which included all of modern-day Madhya Pradesh. Ashoka the greatest of Mauryan rulers, conquered it, bringing the region under firmer control. After the decline of the Maurya empire, the region was contested among the Sakas, the Kushanas, the Satavahanas, and several local dynasties during the 1st to 3rd centuries CE. Heliodorus, the Greek Ambassador to the court of the Shunga King Bhagabhadra erected the Heliodorus pillar near Vidisha.

Ujjain emerged as the predominant commercial centre of western India from the first century CE, located on the trade routes between the Ganges plain and India's Arabian Sea ports. The Satavahana dynasty of the northern Deccan and the Saka dynasty of the Western Satraps fought for the control of Madhya Pradesh during the 1st to 3rd centuries CE.

The Satavahana King Gautamiputra Satakarni inflicted a crushing defeat upon the Saka rulers and conquered parts of Malwa and Gujarat in the 2nd century CE.

Subsequently, the region was conquered by the Gupta Empire in the 4th and 5th centuries, and their southern neighbours, the Vakatakas. The rock-cut temples at Bagh Caves in the Kukshi tehsil of the Dhar District show the presence of the Gupta dynasty in the region, supported by the testimony of a Badwani inscription dated to the year of 487 CE. The attacks and the subsequent seize of Gwalior by the Hephthalites or White Huns brought about the collapse of the Gupta empire, which broke up into smaller states. The King Yasodharman of Malwa defeated the Huns in 528, ending their expansion. Later, Harsha (c. 590–647) ruled the northern parts of the state. Malwa was ruled by the south Indian Rashtrakuta Dynasty from the late 8th century to the 10th century. When the south Indian Emperor Govinda III of the Rashtrakuta dynasty annexed Malwa, he set up the family of one of his subordinates there, who took the name of Paramara.

The Medieval period saw the rise of the Rajput clans, including the Paramaras of Malwa and the Chandelas of Bundelkhand along with the Lodhis. The Chandellas built the majestic Hindu-Jain temples at Khajuraho, which represent the culmination of Hindu temple architecture in Central India. The Gurjara-Pratihara dynasty also held sway in Gwalior and western Madhya Pradesh at this time. It also left some monuments of architectural value in Gwalior. Southern parts of Madhya Pradesh like Malwa were several times invaded by the south Indian Western Chalukya Empire which imposed its rule on the Paramara kingdom of Malwa. The Paramara King Bhoja (c. 1010–1060) was claimed to be a renowned polymath. The small Gond kingdoms emerged in the Gondwana and Mahakoshal regions of the state.

In early 10th century Gwalior and northern Madhya Pradesh came under the rule of Kachchhapaghata dynasty, they belongs to the rajput clan. Gwalior was attacked and conquered by the Turkic Delhi Sultanate in the 12th century. Around 1500 Kachchhapaghata women along with the ladies of royal family committed jauhar at Gwalior Fort. The Kachchhapaghata later shifted to Amer (Jaipur). After the collapse of the Delhi Sultanate at the end of the 14th century, independent regional kingdoms re-emerged, including the Tomara kingdom of Gwalior and the Muslim Sultanate of Malwa, with its capital at Mandu.

The Malwa Sultanate was conquered by the Sultanate of Gujarat in 1531. In the 1540s, most parts of the state fell to Sher Shah Suri, and subsequently to the Hindu king Hemu. Hemu, who had earlier served as the General of the Islamic Suri dynasty, operated from the Gwalior Fort during 1553–56 and became the ruler of Delhi as a Vikramaditya king winning 22 battles continuously from Bengal to Gujarat and defeating Akbar's forces in the Battle of Delhi on 7 October 1556. However, he chose Delhi as his capital after his formal Coronation in Gwalior. After Hemu's defeat by Akbar at the Second Battle of Panipat in 1556, Akbar seized Gwalior along with this most of Madhya Pradesh came under the Mughal rule. Gondwana and Mahakoshal remained under the control of Gond kings, who acknowledged Mughal suzerainty but enjoyed virtual autonomy.

The Mughal control weakened considerably after the death of Emperor Aurangzeb in 1707. Gwalior came under the rule of Jats and Bhim Singh Rana become ruler. However, he was defeated by the Scindias in 1735. Between 1720 and 1760, the Marathas conquered most of Madhya Pradesh, resulting in the establishment of semi-autonomous states under the nominal control of the Peshwa of Pune: the Holkars of Indore ruled much of Malwa, Pawars ruled Dewas and Dhar, the Bhonsles of Nagpur dominated Mahakoshal-Gondwana area, while the Scindias of Gwalior controlled the vast northern parts of the state along with Ajmer and Agra. Later mughals accepted the surzenity of the Scindia dynasty. The most notable Maratha rulers of the region were Mahadji Scindia, Daulat Rao Scindia, Ahilyabai Holkar and Yashwantrao Holkar. Besides these, there were several other small states, including Bhopal, Orchha, and Rewa. The Bhopal state, which paid tribute to both the Marathas and the Nizam of Hyderabad, was founded by Dost Mohammed Khan, a former General in the Mughal army.

After the Third Anglo-Maratha War, the British conquered the entire region. All the sovereign states in the region became princely states of British India, governed by the Central India Agency. The Mahakoshal region became a British province: the Saugor and Nerbudda Territories. In 1861, the British merged the Nagpur Province with the Saugor and Nerbudda Territories to form the Central Provinces.

During the 1857 uprising, rebellions happened in the northern parts of the state, led by leaders like Tatya Tope, Rani Avantibai Lodhi. However, these were crushed by the British and the princes loyal to them. The state witnessed a number of anti-British activities and protests during the Indian independence movement. Several notable leaders such as Chandra Shekhar Azad, B. R. Ambedkar, Shankar Dayal Sharma, Atal Bihari Vajpayee, Rajmata Vijaya Raje Scindia, Arjun Singh and Madhavrao Scindia were born in what is now Madhya Pradesh.

Madhya Pradesh in 1951

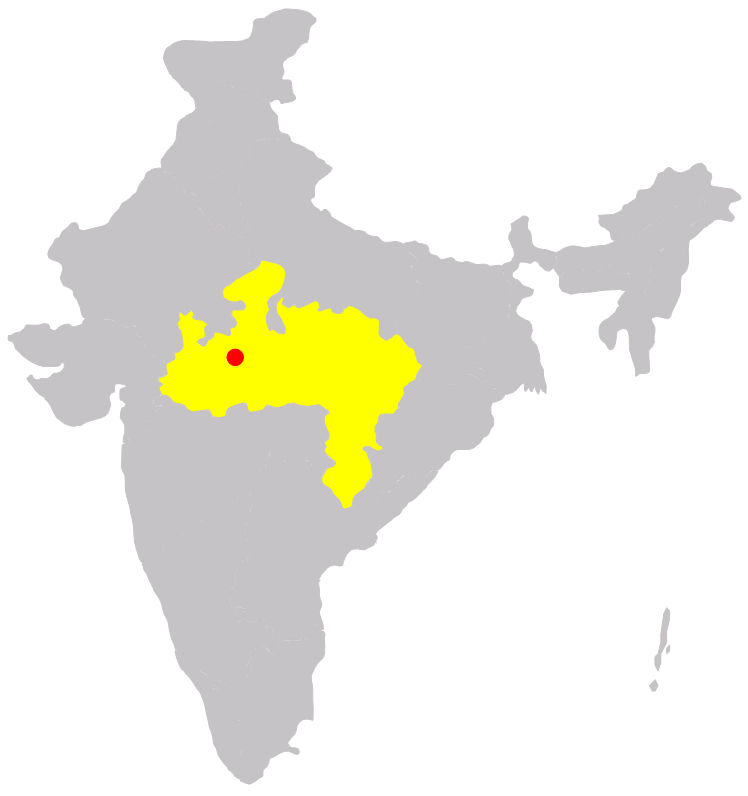
Madhya Padesh after States Reorganisation Act, 1956 with Bhopal as its capital

After the independence of India, Madhya Pradesh was created in 1950 from the former British Central Provinces and Berar and the princely states of Makrai and Chhattisgarh, with Nagpur as the capital of the state. The new states of Madhya Bharat, Vindhya Pradesh, and Bhopal were formed out of the Central India Agency. In 1956, the states of Madhya Bharat, Vindhya Pradesh, and Bhopal were merged into Madhya Pradesh, and the Marathi-speaking southern region Vidarbha, which included Nagpur, was ceded to Bombay state. Jabalpur was chosen to be the capital of the state but at the last moment, due to political interference Jabalpur sacrificed his place of Capital but then Bhopal was made the state capital. In November 2000, as part of the Madhya Pradesh Reorganisation Act, the southeastern portion of the state split off to form the new state of Chhattisgarh.

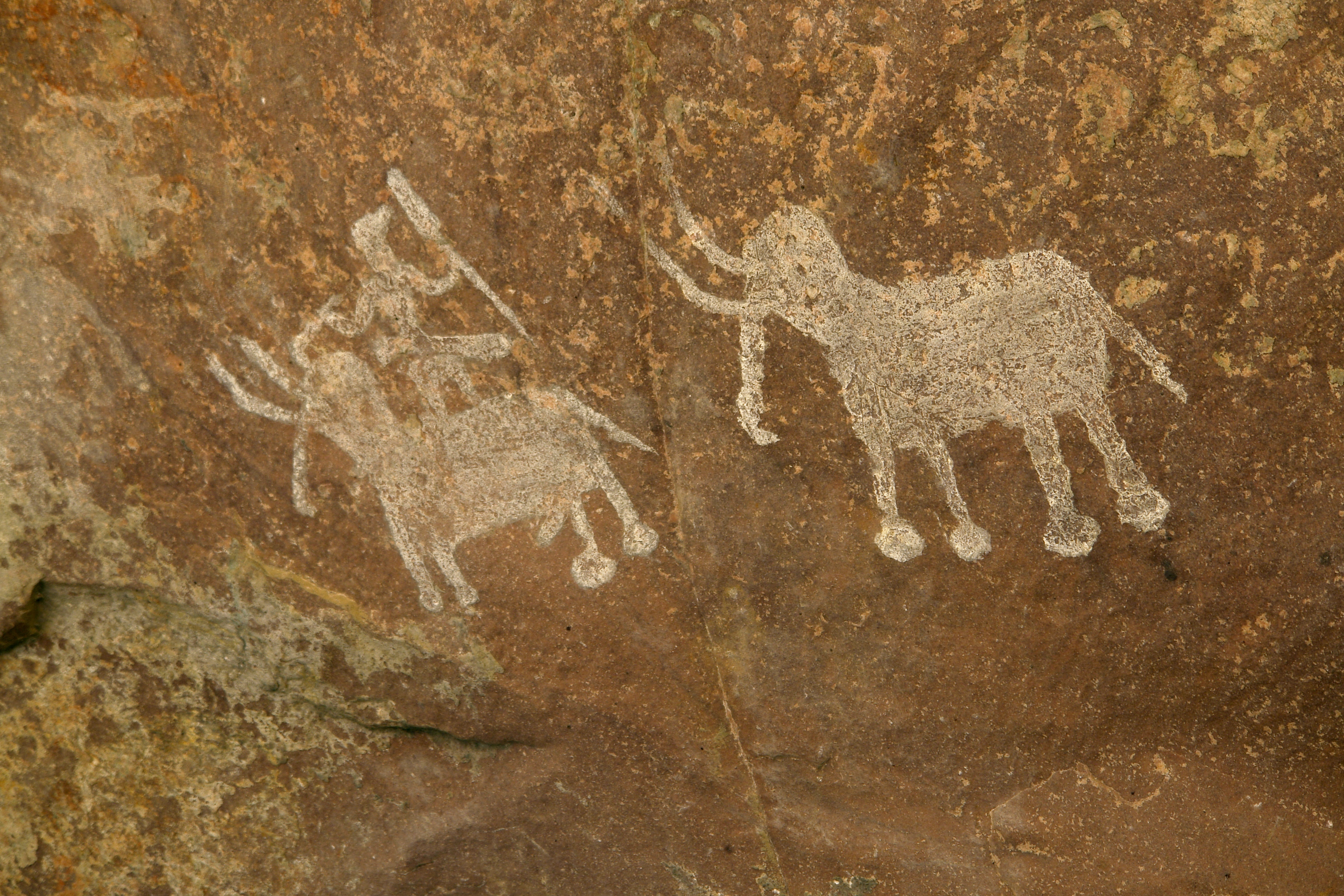
Mesolithic rock painting, Bhimbetka rock shelters, a UNESCO World Heritage Site in Raisen

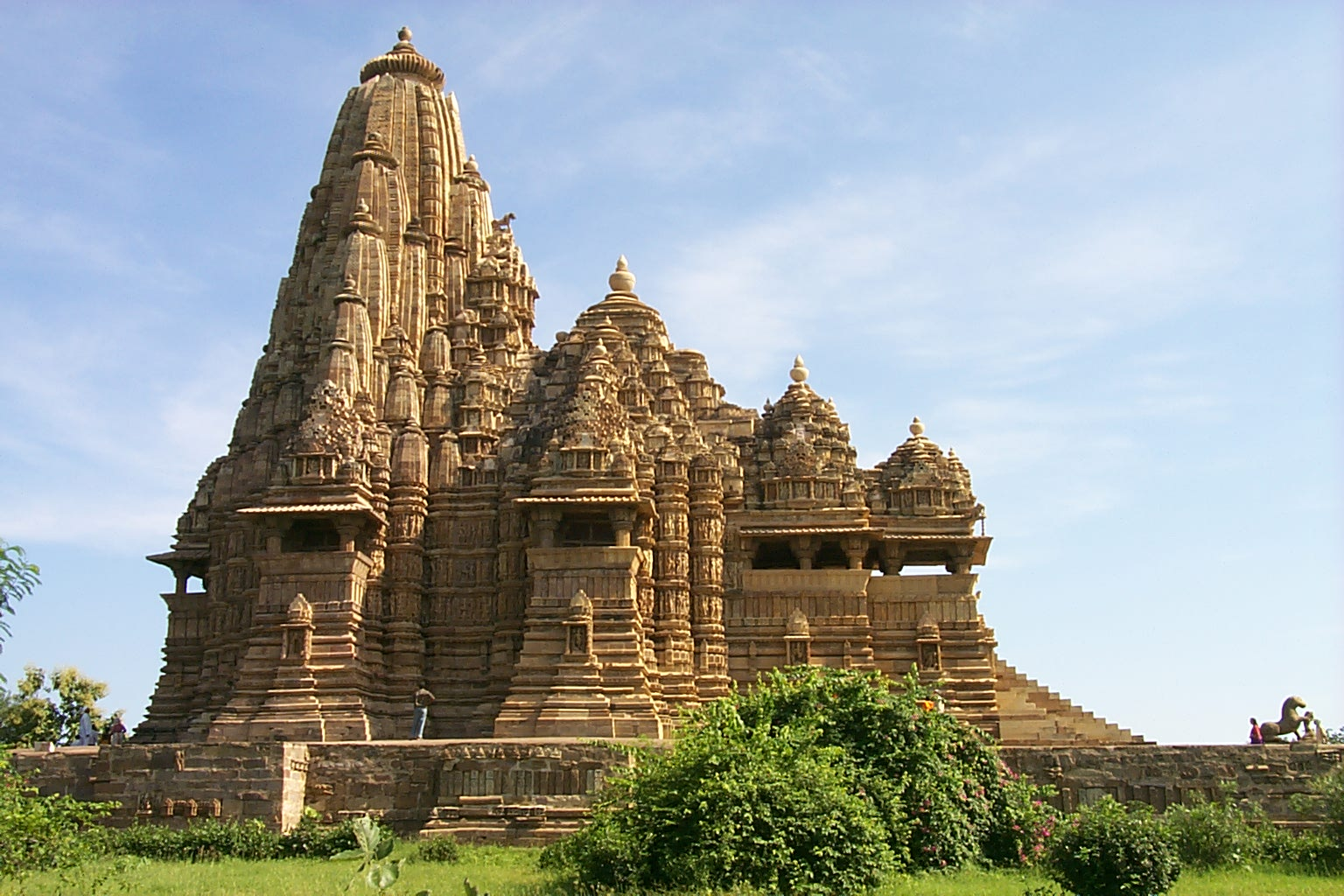
Kandariya Mahadeva Temple, Khajuraho

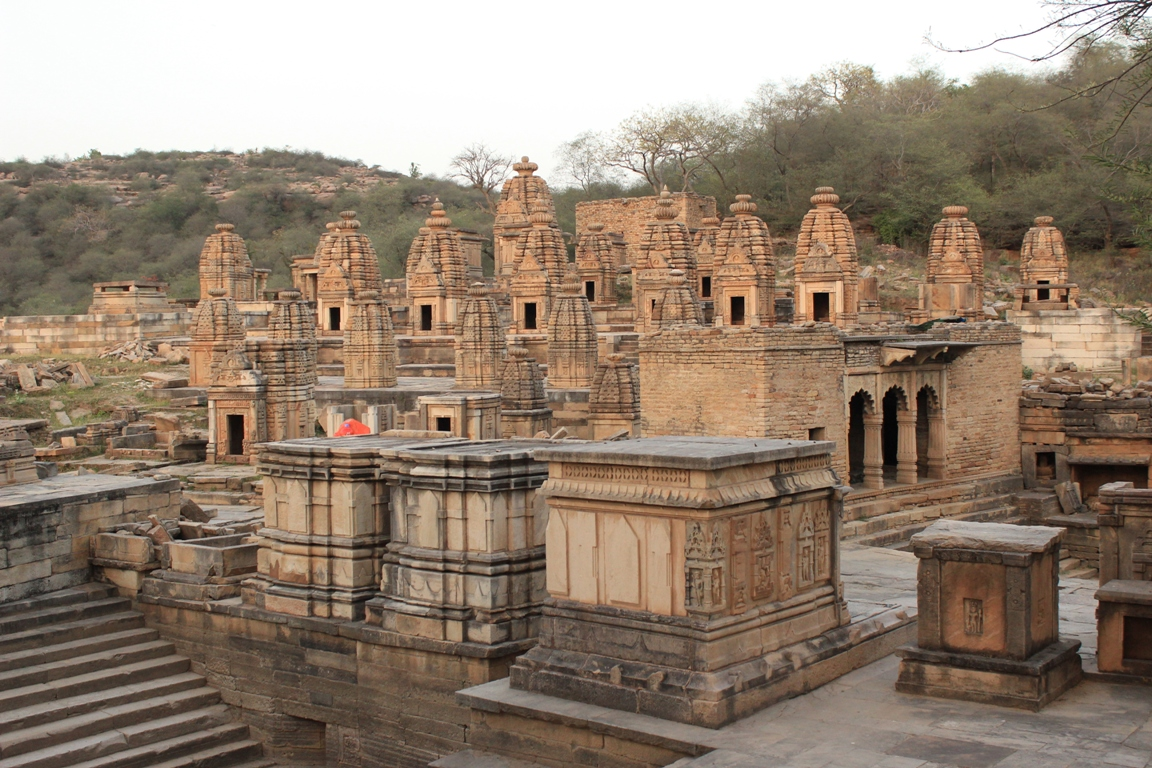
Bateshwar temple complex, Padavli, Morena

== Geography ==
=== Location in India ===
Madhya Pradesh literally means "Central Province", and is located in the geographic heart of India in between the latitude of 21.6°N–26.30°N and longitude of 74°9'E–82°48'E. The state straddles the Narmada River, which runs east and west between the Vindhya and Satpura ranges; these ranges and the Narmada are the traditional boundaries between the north and south of India. The highest point in Madhya Pradesh is Dhupgarh, with an elevation of 1,350 m (4,429 ft).

The state is bordered on the west by Gujarat, on the northwest by Rajasthan, on the northeast by Uttar Pradesh, on the east by Chhattisgarh, and on the south by Maharashtra.

Physical map of Madhya Pradesh village Tumen Ashoknagar

=== Climate ===
Madhya Pradesh also has three major seasons – Summer, Monsoon, and Winter. During summer (March–June), the temperature in the entire state ranges above 34.6 °C (94.3 °F) it has increased as it is all-time high in Madhya Pradesh. In general, the eastern parts of Madhya Pradesh are hotter than the western parts. The regions like Gwalior, Morena and Datia record temperatures of over 42 °C (108 °F) in May. The humidity is relatively very low and the region usually experiences frequent mild dust storms. The southwest Monsoon usually breaks out in mid-June and the entire state receives a major share of its rainfall between June and September. The south and south-east regions tend to experience a higher rainfall whereas the parts of the north-west receive less. Jabalpur, Mandla, Balaghat, Sidhi, and other extreme eastern parts receive more than 1,500 mm (60 in) of rainfall. The districts of western Madhya Pradesh receive less than 800 mm (30 in) of rainfall.

The winter season starts in November. The temperature remains low in the northern parts of the state in comparison to the southern parts. The daily maximum temperature in most of the northern part of January remains between 15 and 18 °C (59 and 64 °F). The climate is generally dry and pleasant with a clear sky. The average rainfall is about 1,194 mm (50 in). The southeastern districts have the heaviest rainfall, some places receiving as much as 2,150 mm (84.6 in), while the western and northwestern districts receive 1,000 mm (39.4 in) or less.

=== Ecology ===
According to the 2011 figures, the recorded forest area of the state is 94,689 km^{2} (36,560 mi^{2}) constituting 30.7% of the geographical area of the state. It constitutes 12.3% of the forest area of India. Legally this area has been classified into "Reserved Forest" (65.3%), "Protected Forest" (32.8%) and "Unclassified Forest" (0.2%). Per capita forest area is 2,400 m^{2} (0.59 acres) as against the national average of 700 m^{2} (0.17 acres). The forest cover is less dense in the northern and western parts of the state, which contain the major urban centres. Variability in climatic and edaphic conditions brings about significant difference in the forest types of the state. In January 2019 1.5 million volunteers in the state planted 66 million trees in 12 hours along the Narmada River.

The major types of soils found in the state are:

- Black soil, most predominantly in the Malwa region, Mahakoshal and in southern Bundelkhand
- Red and yellow soil, in the Baghelkhand region
- Alluvial soil, in Northern Madhya Pradesh
- Laterite soil, in highland areas
- Mixed soil, in parts of the Gwalior Chambal region.

=== Flora and fauna ===
Madhya Pradesh is home to eleven National Parks; Kuno National Park, Bandhavgarh National Park, Kanha National Park, Satpura National Park, Sanjay National Park, Madhav National Park, Van Vihar National Park, Mandla Plant Fossils National Park, Panna National Park, Pench National Park and Dinosaur National Park, Dhar.

There are also a number of nature reserves, including Amarkantak, Bagh Caves, Balaghat, Bori Natural Reserve, Ken Gharial, Ghatigaon, Kuno Palpur, Narwar, Chambal, Kukdeshwar, Chidi Kho, Nauradehi, Pachmarhi, Panpatha, Shikarganj, Patalkot, and Tamia. Pachmarhi Biosphere Reserve in Satpura Range, Amarkantak biosphere reserve and Panna National Park are three of the 18 biosphere reserves in India. Most of them are located in eastern Madhya Pradesh near Jabalpur.

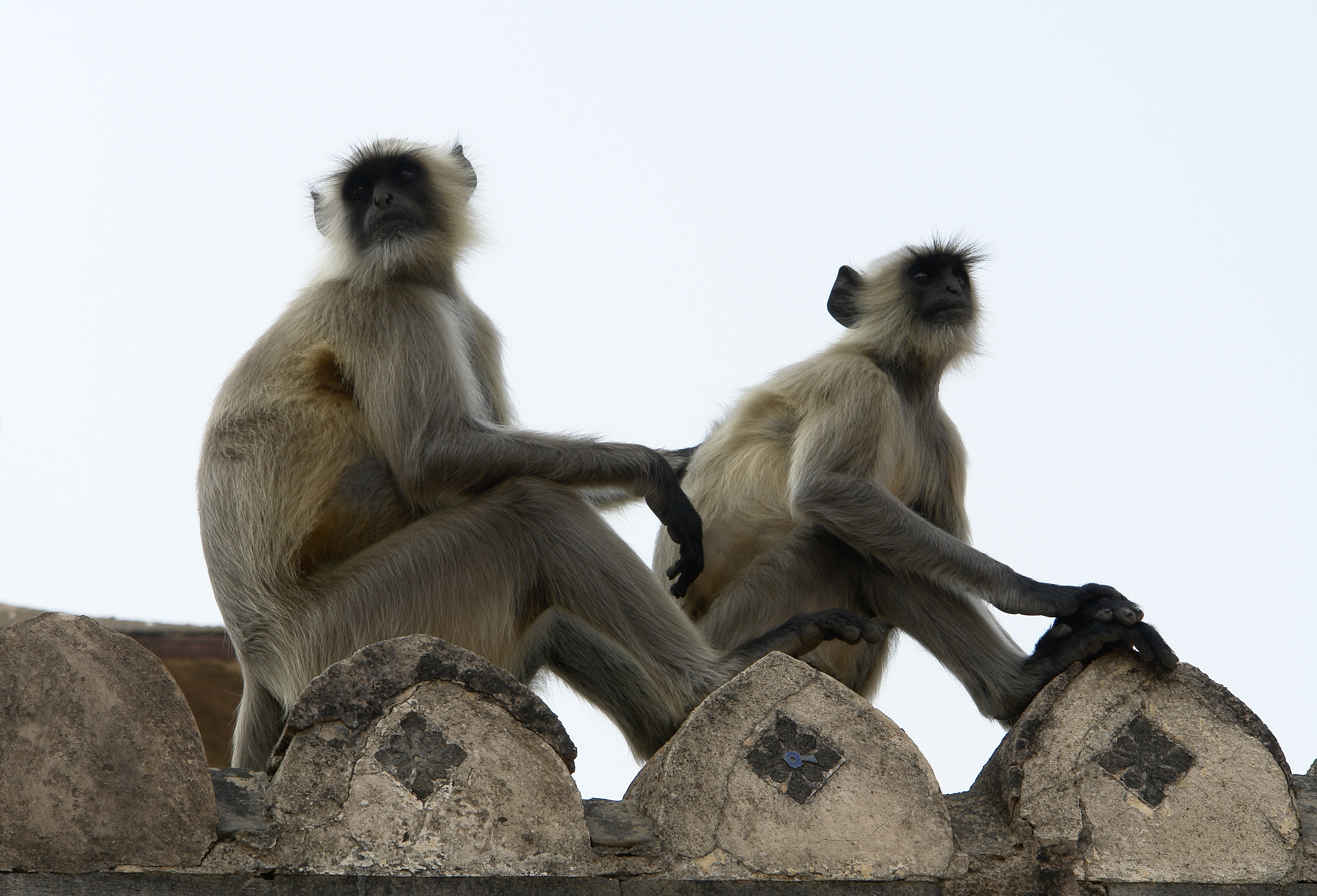
Langur monkey (Semnopithecus dussumieri), Orchha

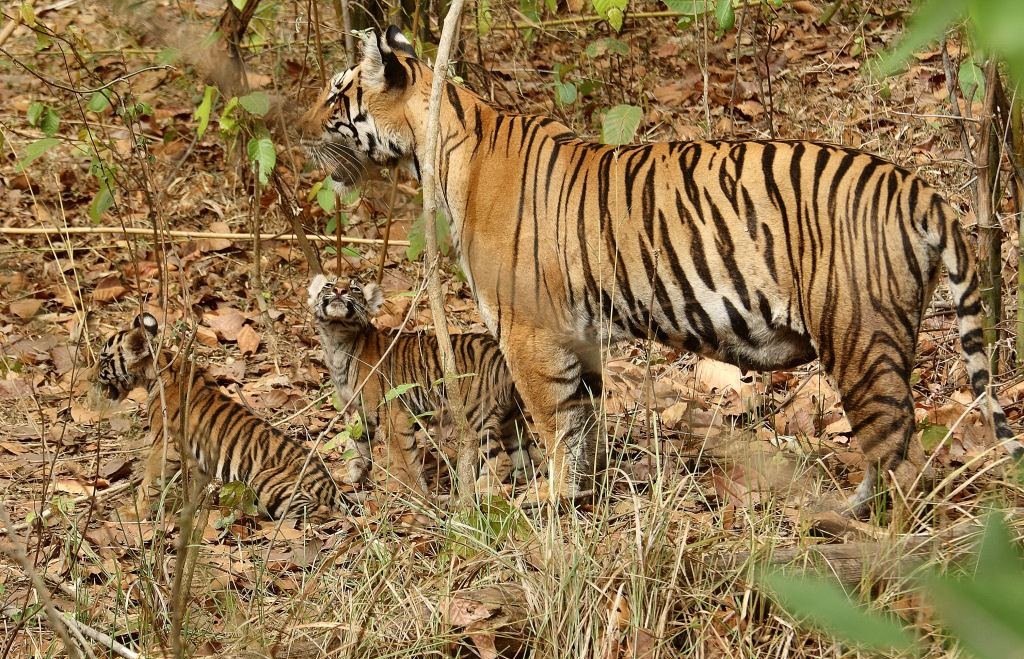
Tigress with cubs in Kanha Tiger Reserve

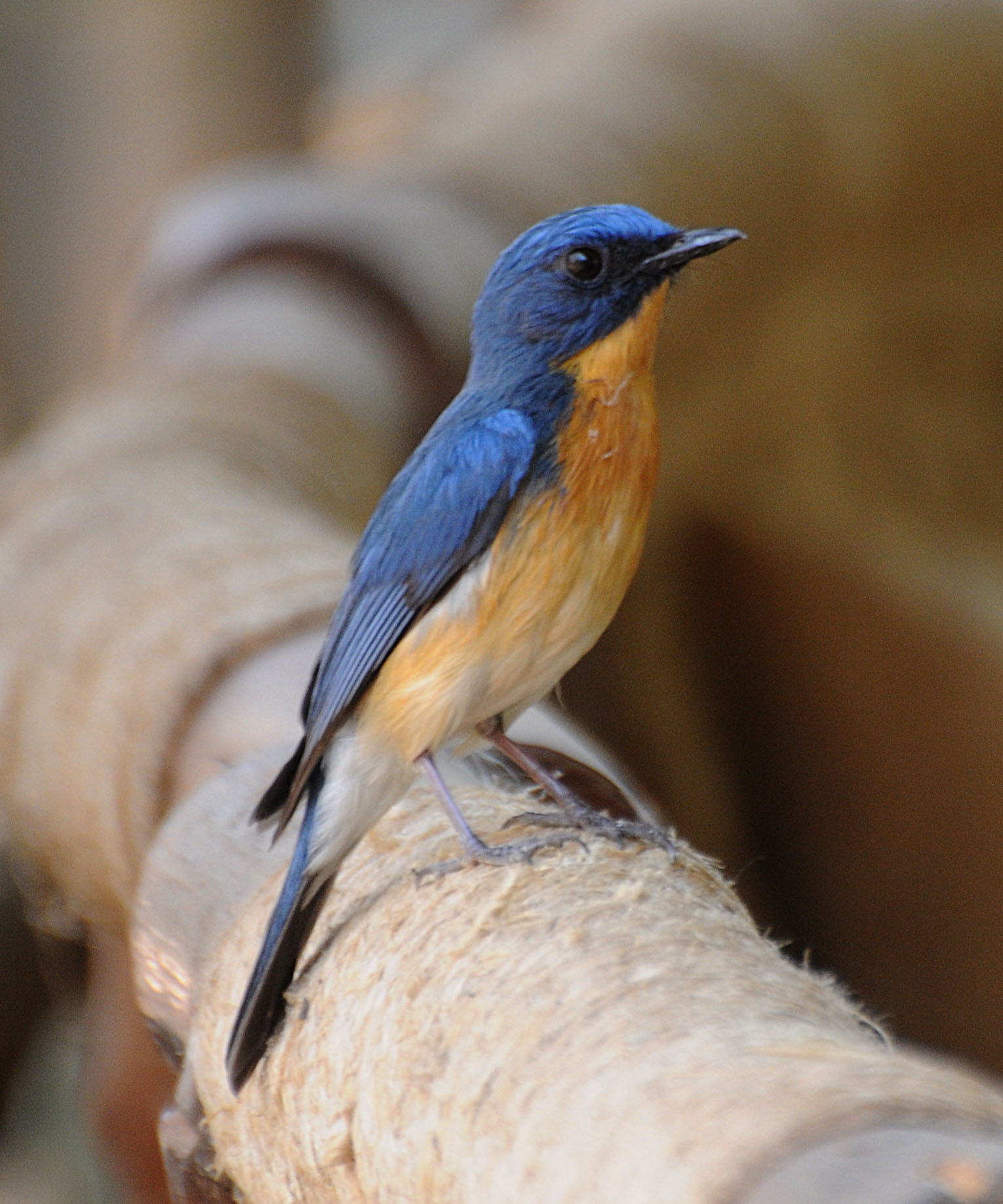
Tickell's blue flycatcher, Bandhavgarh National Park

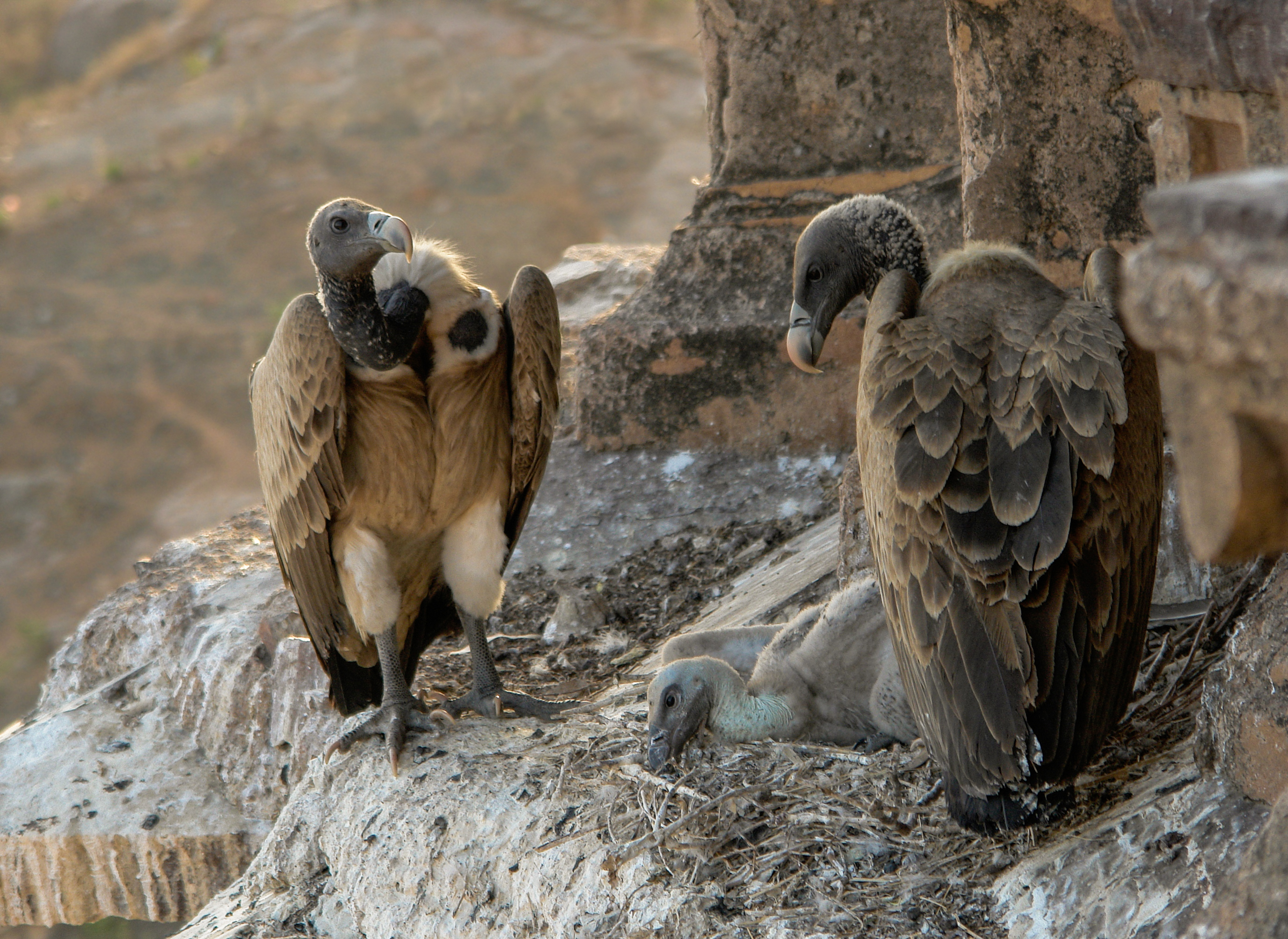
Vultures in the nest, Orchha

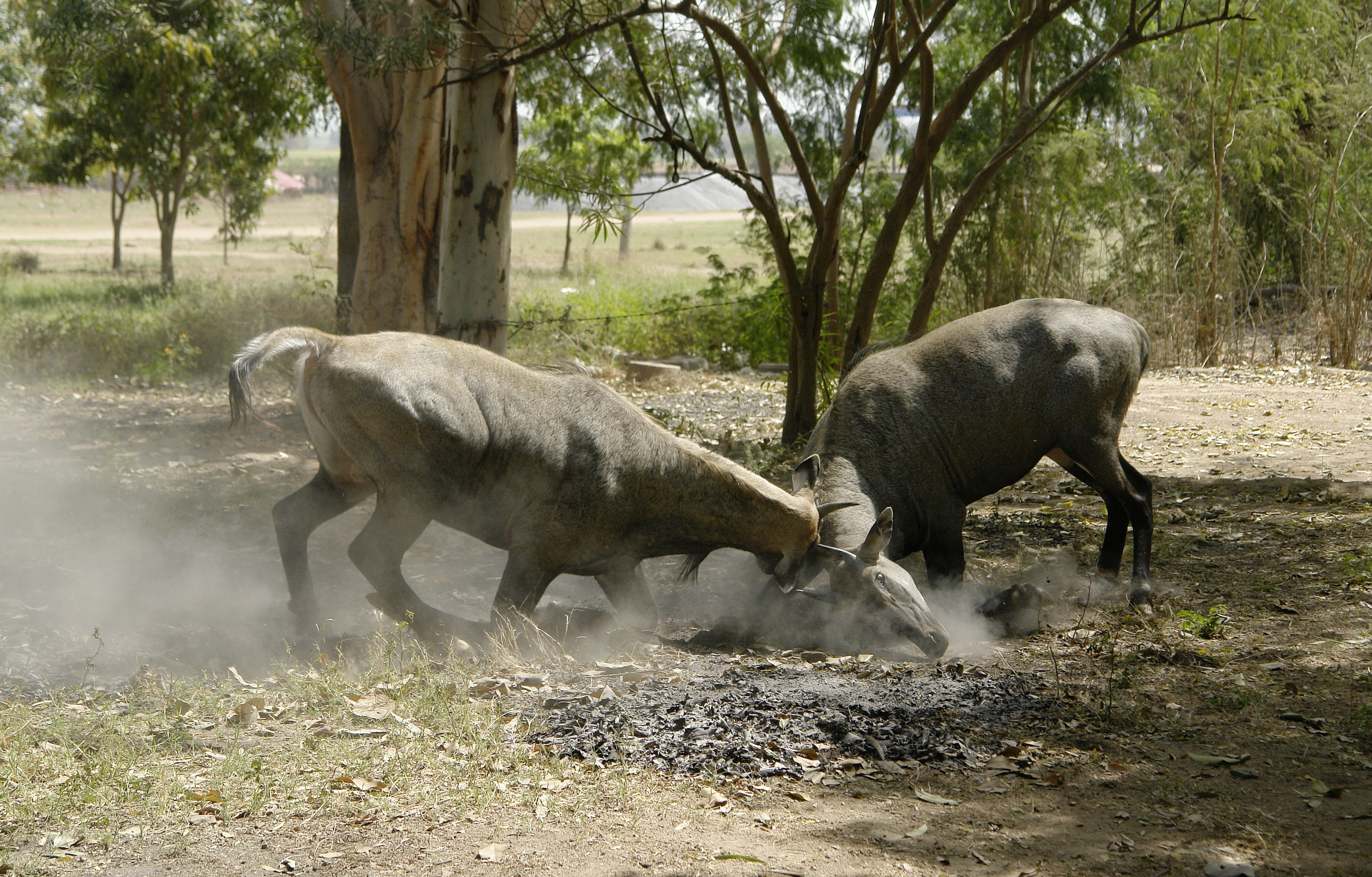
Male nilgais fighting, Lakeshwari, Gwalior district

Kanha, Bandhavgarh, Pench, Panna, and Satpura National Parks are managed as Project Tiger areas. The National Chambal Sanctuary is managed for conservation of gharial and mugger, river dolphin, smooth-coated otter and a number of turtle species. Ken-gharial and Son-gharial sanctuaries are managed for conservation of gharial and mugger. The barasingha is the state animal and the dudhraj is the state bird of Madhya Pradesh.

Based on composition, the teak and sal forests are the important forest formations in the state. Bamboo-bearing areas are widely distributed.

==== State symbols of Madhya Pradesh ====
Title	Symbol	Image
State animal	Barasingha (Rucervus duvaucelii)	
State bird	Indian paradise flycatcher (Terpsiphone paradisi)	
State tree	banyan tree (ficus bengalensis)	
State fish	Mahasheer (Tor tor)	
State Flower	Madonna lily (Lilium candidum)	

=== Rivers ===
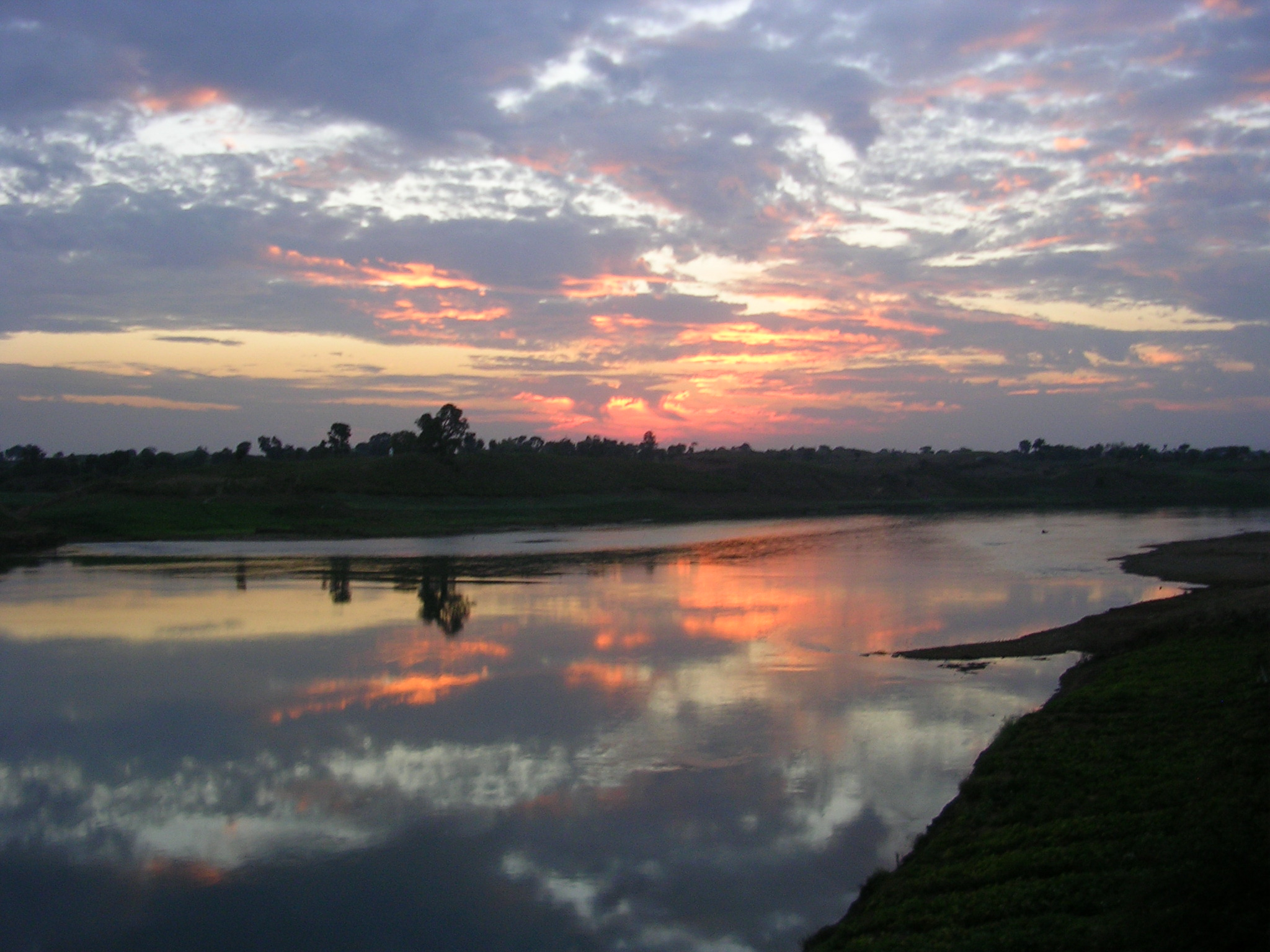
Narmada River

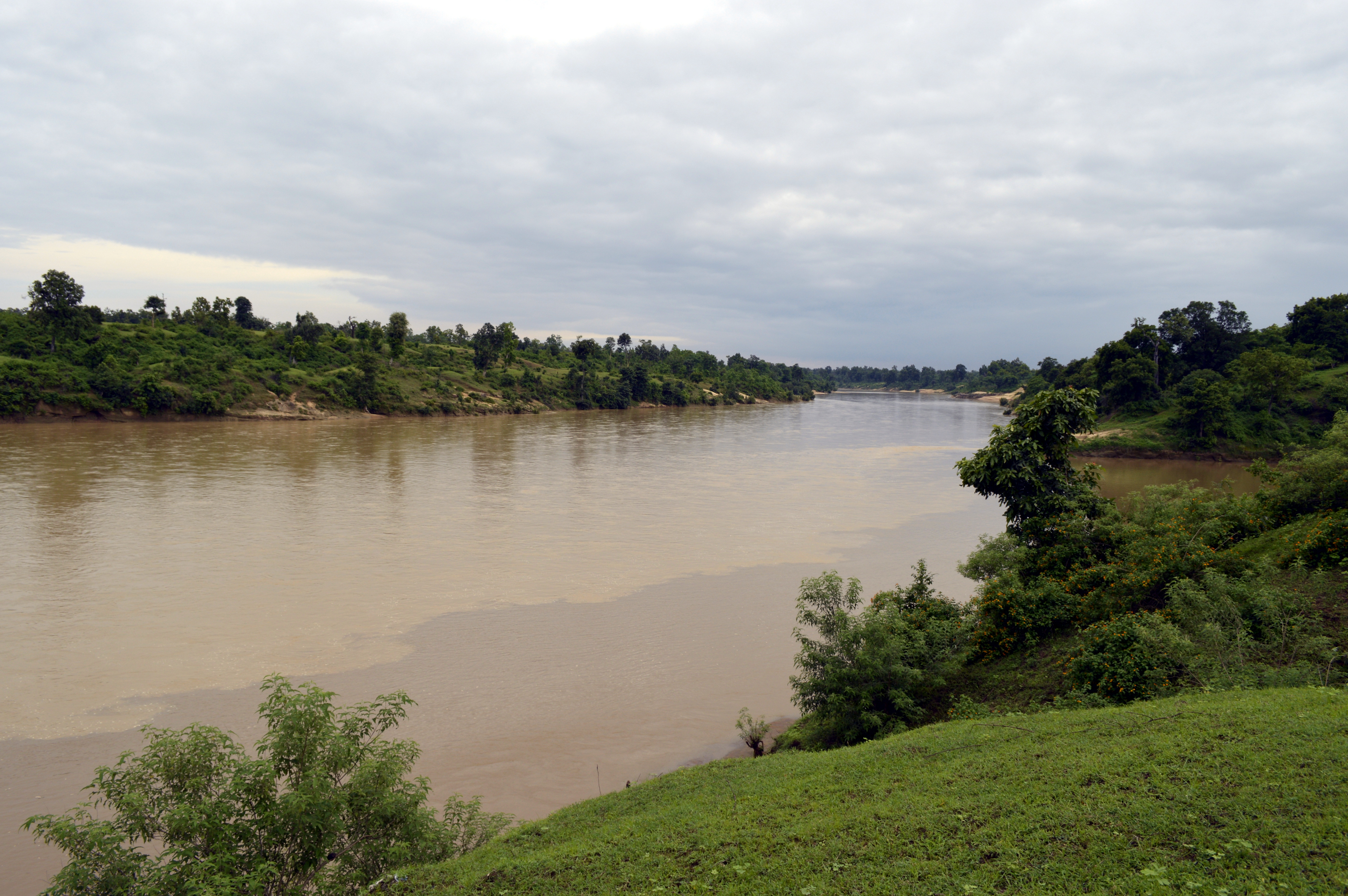
Son River, Umaria district

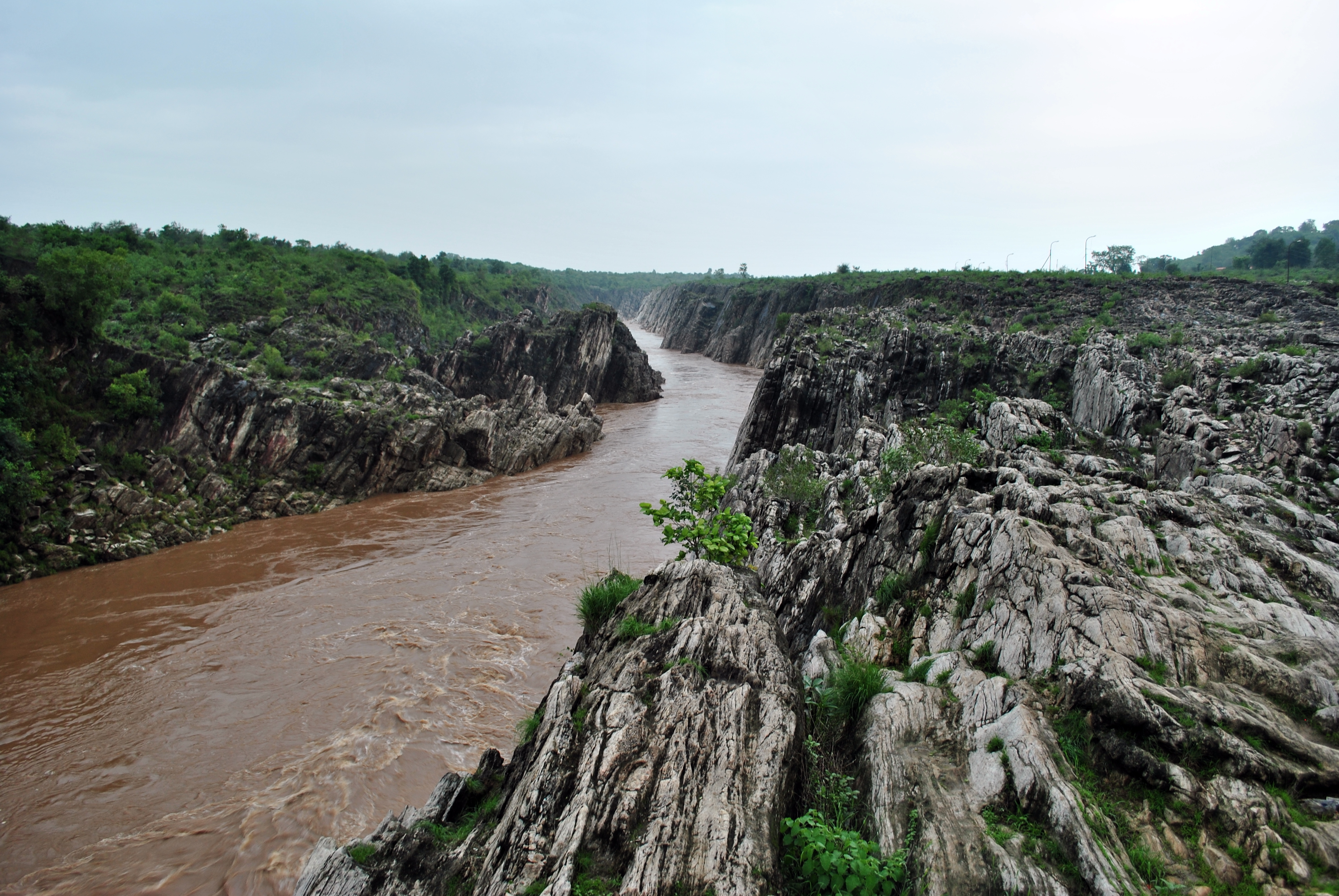
The River Narmada flows through a gorge of marble rocks in Bhedaghat, Jabalpur

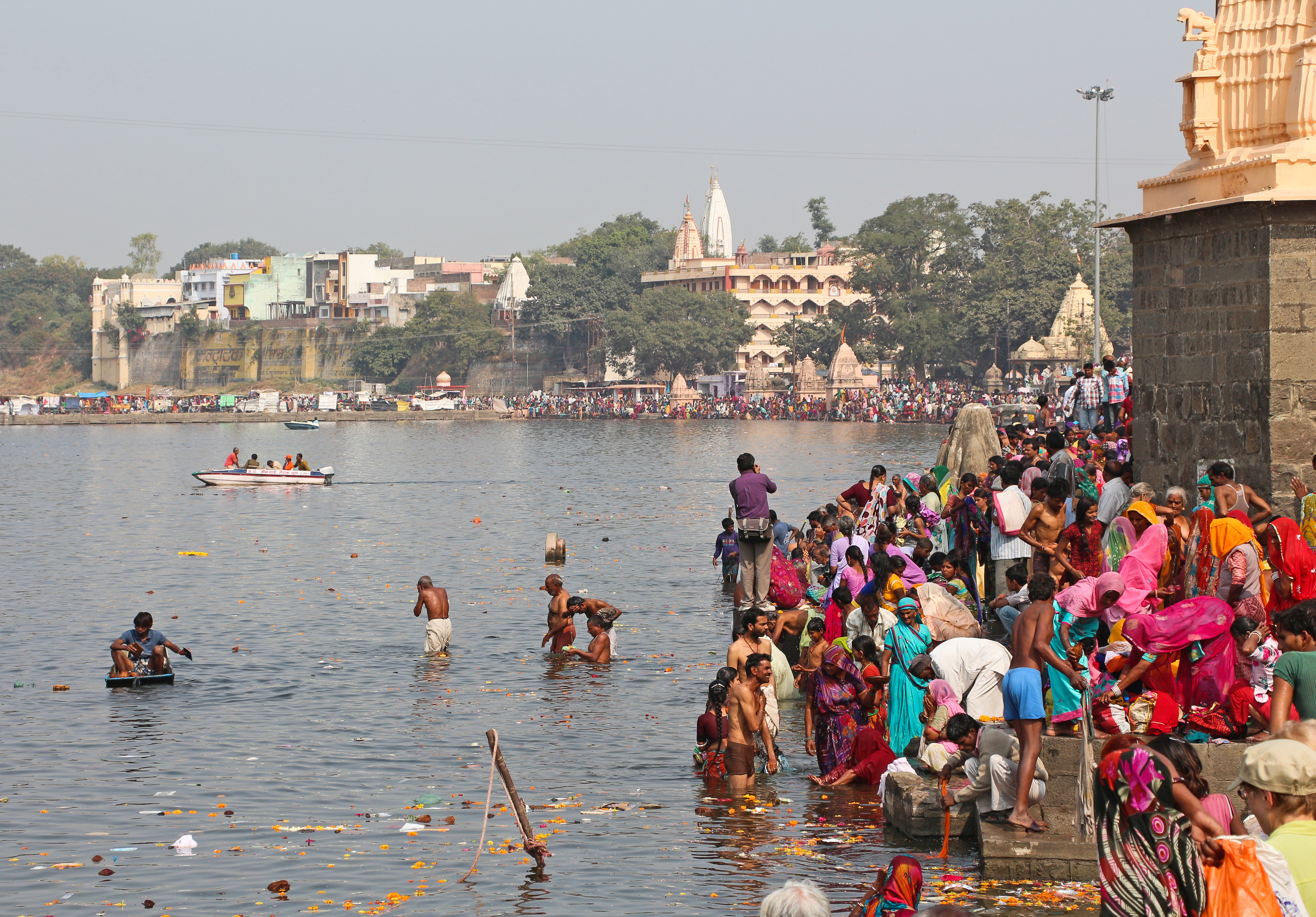
The Shri Ram Ghat on the Shipra River in Ujjain

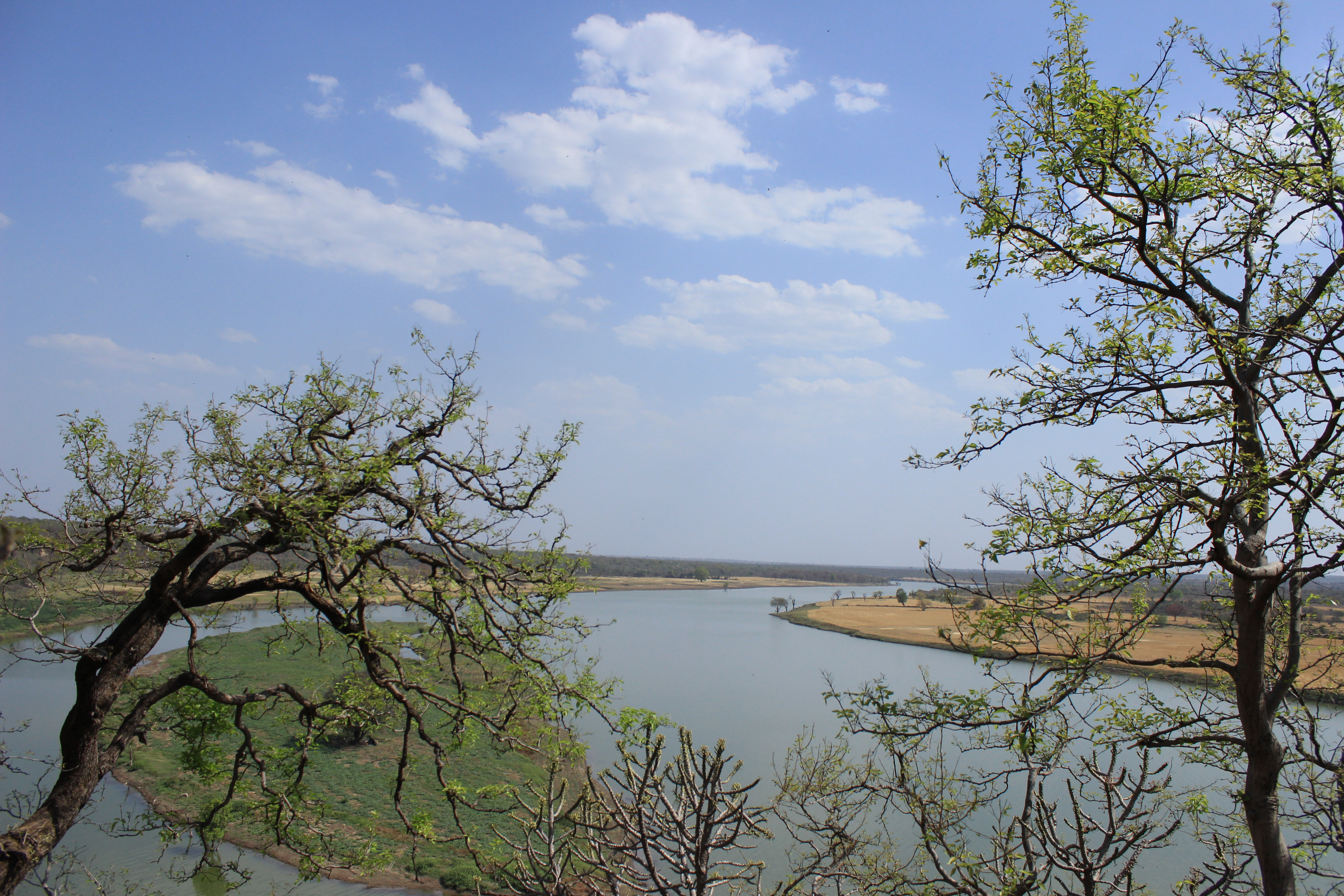
Betwa in the Ashoknagar district

The Narmada is the longest river in Madhya Pradesh. It flows westward through a rift valley, with the Vindhya ranges sprawling along its northern bank and the Satpura range of mountains along the southern. Its tributaries include the Banjar, the Tawa, the Machna, the Shakkar, the Denwa and the Sonbhadra rivers. The Tapti River runs parallel to Narmada, and also flows through a rift valley. The Narmada–Tapti systems carry an enormous volume of water and provide drainage for almost a quarter of the land area of Madhya Pradesh. The Narmada river is considered very sacred and is worshipped throughout the region. It is the main source of water and acts as a lifeline to the state.

The Vindhyas form the southern boundary of the Ganges basin, with the western part of the Ganges basin draining into the Yamuna and the eastern part directly into the Ganges itself. All the rivers, which drain into the Ganges, flow from south to north, with the Chambal, Shipra, Kali Sindh, Parbati, Kuno, Sind, Betwa, Dhasan, Ken and Sunarrivers being the main tributaries of the Yamuna. Shipra River is one of the most sacred rivers of Hinduism. It is the site of the Simhastha Kumbh Mela, which is held every 12 years. Shipra is stretched across Indore, Ujjain and Dewas. The land drained by these rivers is agriculturally rich, with the natural vegetation largely consisting of grass and dry deciduous forest types, largely thorny. The eastern part of the Ganges basin consists of the Son, the Tons and the Rihand Rivers. Son, which arises in the Maikal hills around Amarkantak, is the largest tributary that goes into the Ganges on the south bank and that does not arise from the Himalayas. Son and its tributaries contribute the bulk of the monsoon flow into the Ganges, because the north bank tributaries are all snow fed. The forests in their basins are much richer than the thorn forests of the northwestern part of Madhya Pradesh.

After the formation of Chhattisgarh State, the major portion of Mahanadi basin now lies in Chhattisgarh. Presently, only 154 km^{2} basin area of Hasdeo River in Anuppur District lies in Madhya Pradesh.

The Satpuras, in the Gawilgarh and Mahadeo Hills, also contain a watershed, which is south facing. The Wainganga, the Wardha, the Pench, the Kanhan rivers, discharge an enormous volume of water into the Godavari River system. The Godavari basin consists of sub-tropical, semi-moist forests, mainly in the valley of the Indrawati. There are many important multi-state irrigation projects in development, including the Godavari River Basin Irrigation Projects.

=== Regions ===
Madhya Pradesh is divided into the following agro-climatic zones:

- Kaimur Plateau and Satpura Hills
- Vindhyan Plateau (Hills)
- Narmada valley
- Wainganga valley
- Chambal valley
- Gwalior Region
- Bundelkhand Region
- Satpura Plateau (Hills)
- Malwa Plateau
- Nimar Plateau
- Jhabua Hills

=== Administration ===
Madhya Pradesh is divided into 55 districts for administrative purposes. The district is the main unit of administration. These districts are arranged in 10 divisions, listed below:

- Bhopal Division
- Chambal Division
- Gwalior Division
- Indore Division
- Jabalpur Division
- Narmadapuram Division
- Rewa Division
- Sagar Division
- Shahdol Division
- Ujjain Division

=== Cities ===
Largest cities or towns in Madhya Pradesh As of the 2011 Census
Rank	Name	District	Pop.
1	Indore	Indore	2,167,447
2	Bhopal	Bhopal	1,883,381
3	Jabalpur	Jabalpur	1,267,564
4	Gwalior	Gwalior	1,101,981
5	Ujjain	Ujjain	593,368
6	Sagar	Sagar	370,296
7	Dewas	Dewas	289,438
8	Satna	Satna	283,004
9	Ratlam	Ratlam	273,892
10	Rewa	Rewa	235,422

== Demographics ==
=== Population ===
Historical population
Year	Pop.	±%
1951	18,615,000	—
1961	23,218,000	+24.7%
1971	30,017,000	+29.3%
1981	38,169,000	+27.2%
1991	48,566,000	+27.2%
2001	60,348,000	+24.3%
2011	72,597,565	+20.3%
Source: Census of India

The population of Madhya Pradesh consists of a number of ethnic groups, tribes, castes and communities. The scheduled castes and the scheduled tribes constitute a significant portion of the population of the State at 15.6% and 21.1% respectively.

The main tribal groups in Madhya Pradesh are Gondi, Bhil, Baiga, Korku, Bharia, Halba, Malto and Sahariya. Tribal people form more than 50% of the population in the districts of Mandla, Dhar, Dindori, Barwani, Jhabua and Alirajpur. 90% of the people in Jhabua and Alirajpur have a tribal background.

In Khargone, Khandwa, Burhanpur, Betul, Chhindwara, Seoni, Anuppur, Umaria, Shahdol and Singrauli districts 30–50% of the population is tribal. According to the 2011 census, the tribal population in Madhya Pradesh was 15.34 million, constituting 21.1% of the total population. There were 46 recognised Scheduled Tribes and three of them have been identified as "Special Primitive Tribal Groups" in the State.

Madhya Pradesh ranks 33rd on the Human Development Index with a value of 0.606 (2018). The state's per-capita gross state domestic product (nominal GDP) is the 26th highest in the country (2018–19). According to the SDG India Index 2020–21 compiled by the NITI Aayog, Madhya Pradesh ranks 21st on sustainable development goals, 9th on gender equality, and 10th on clean water and sanitation.

Madhya pradesh ranked ninth in the Fiscal Health Index (FHI) 2025, with a score of 42.2.

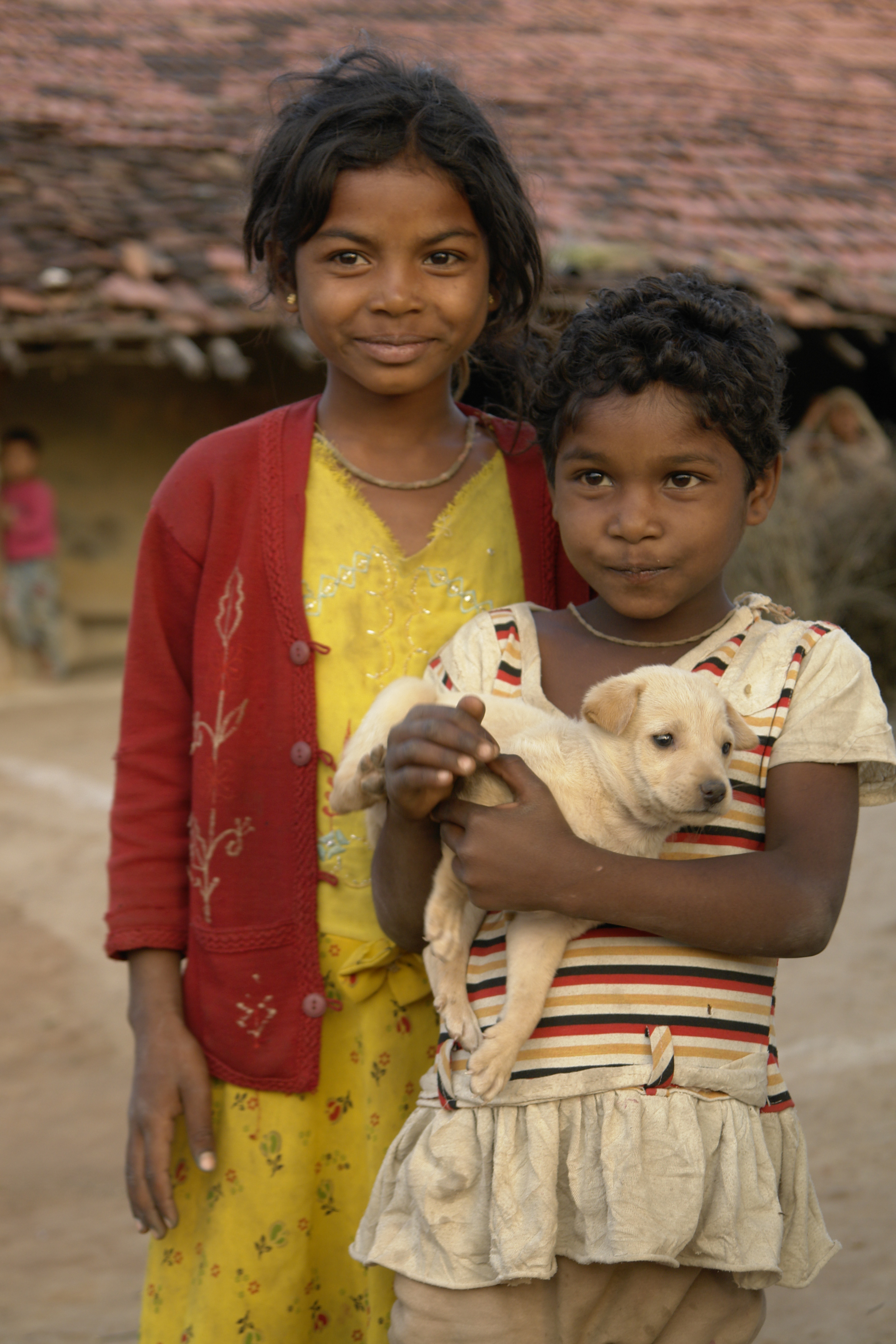
Children in Raisen district, Bhil tribe

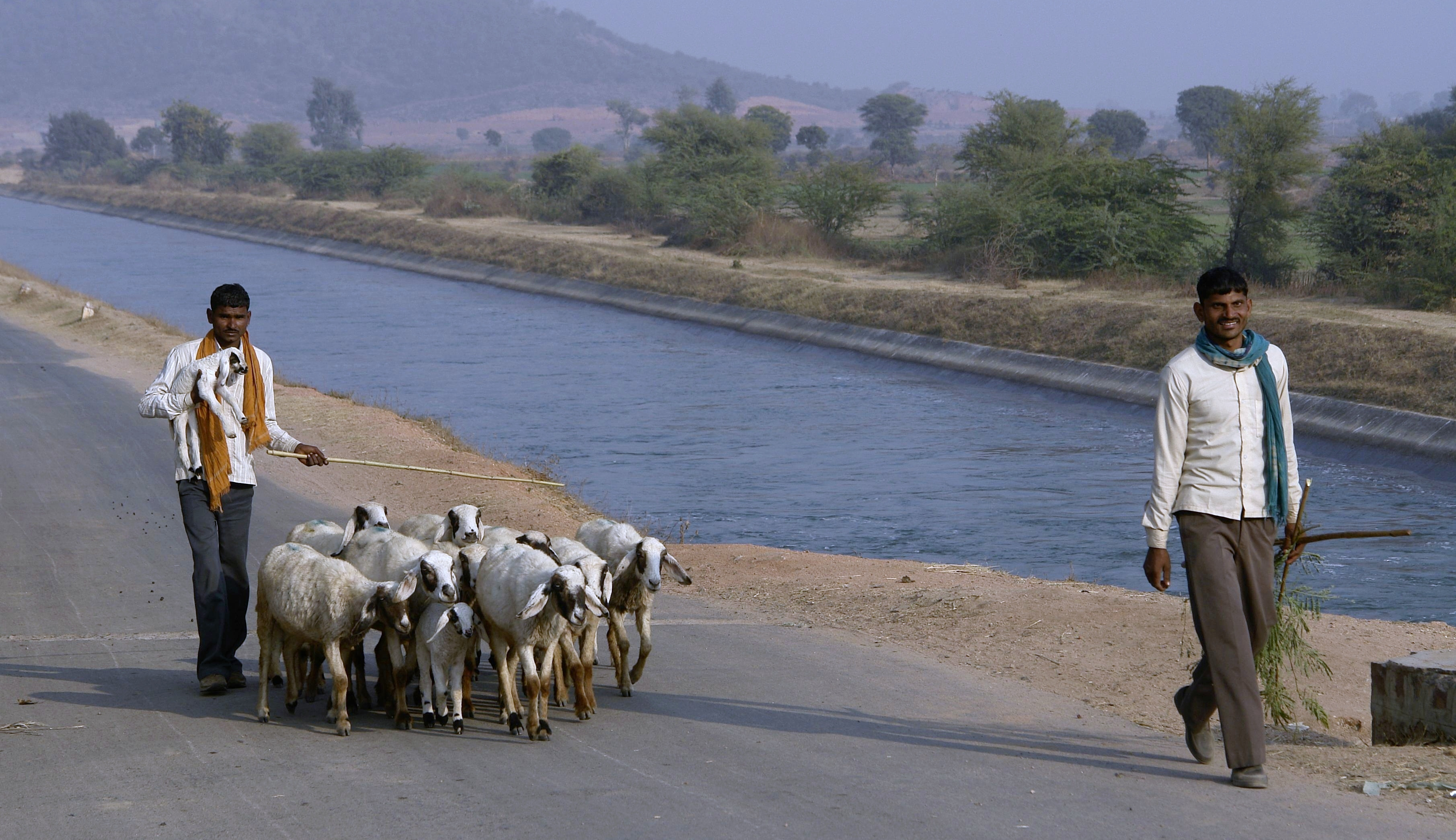
Shepherds in Chambal

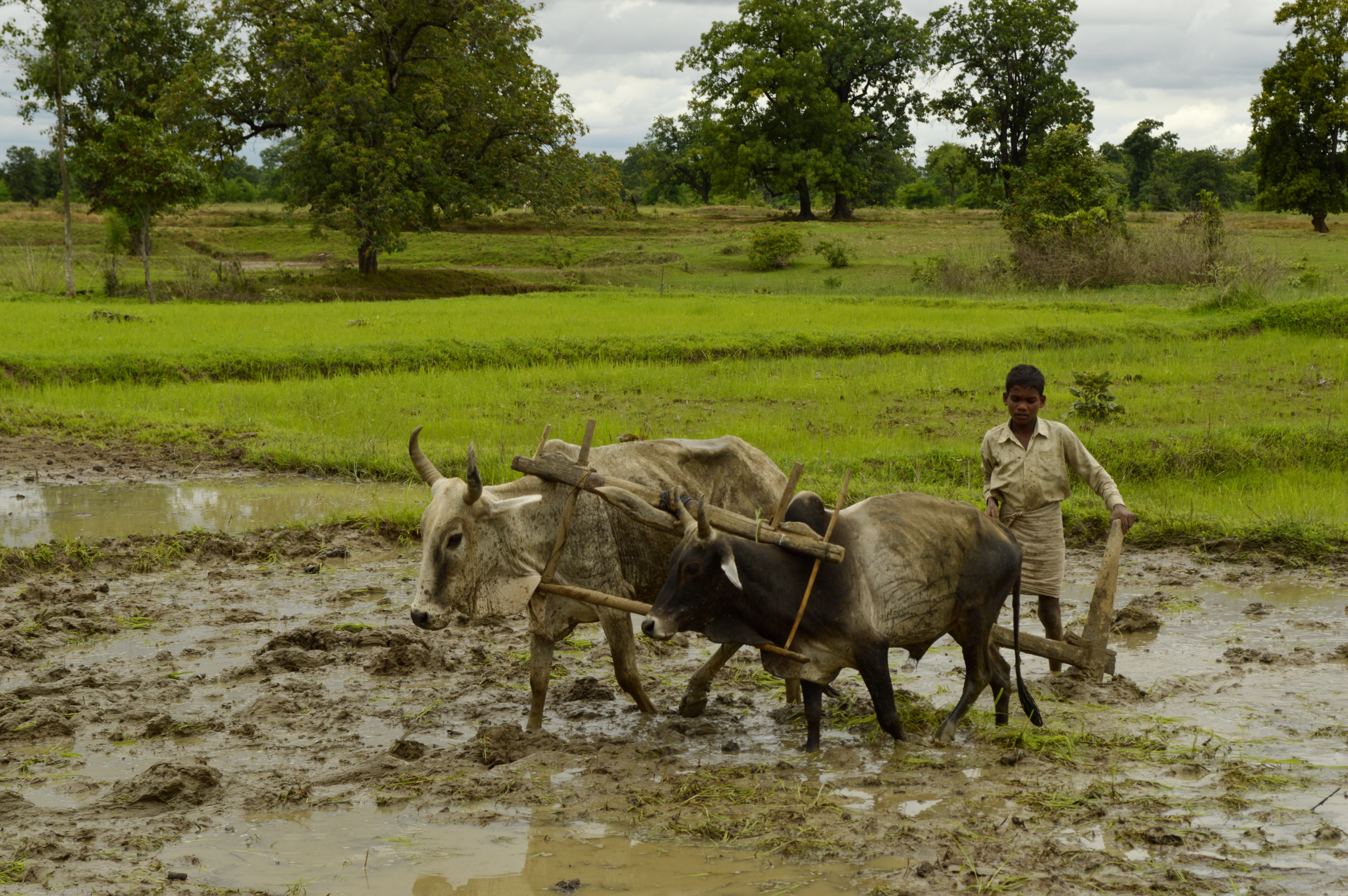
A young farmer in Umaria district

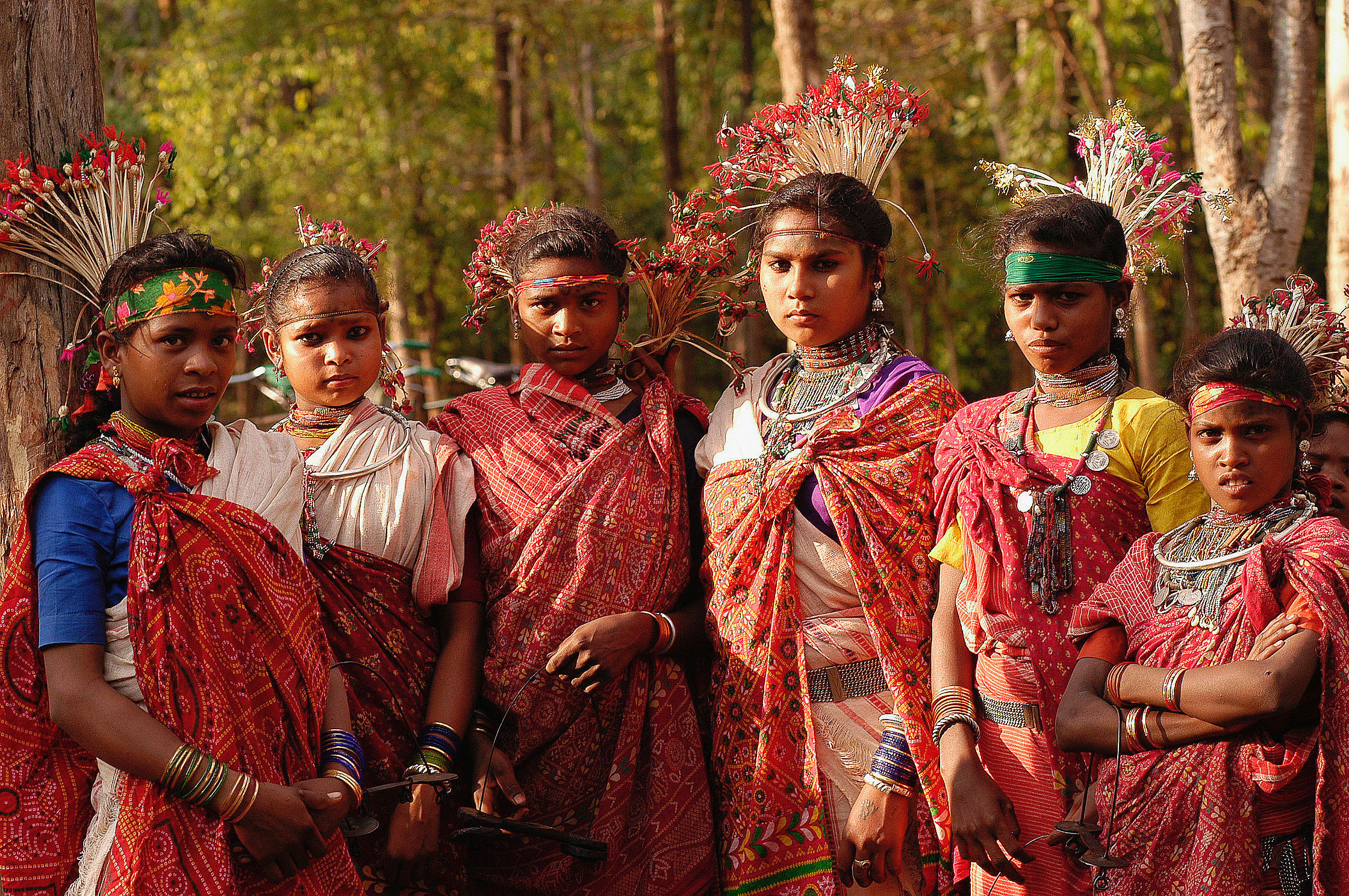
Young Baiga women

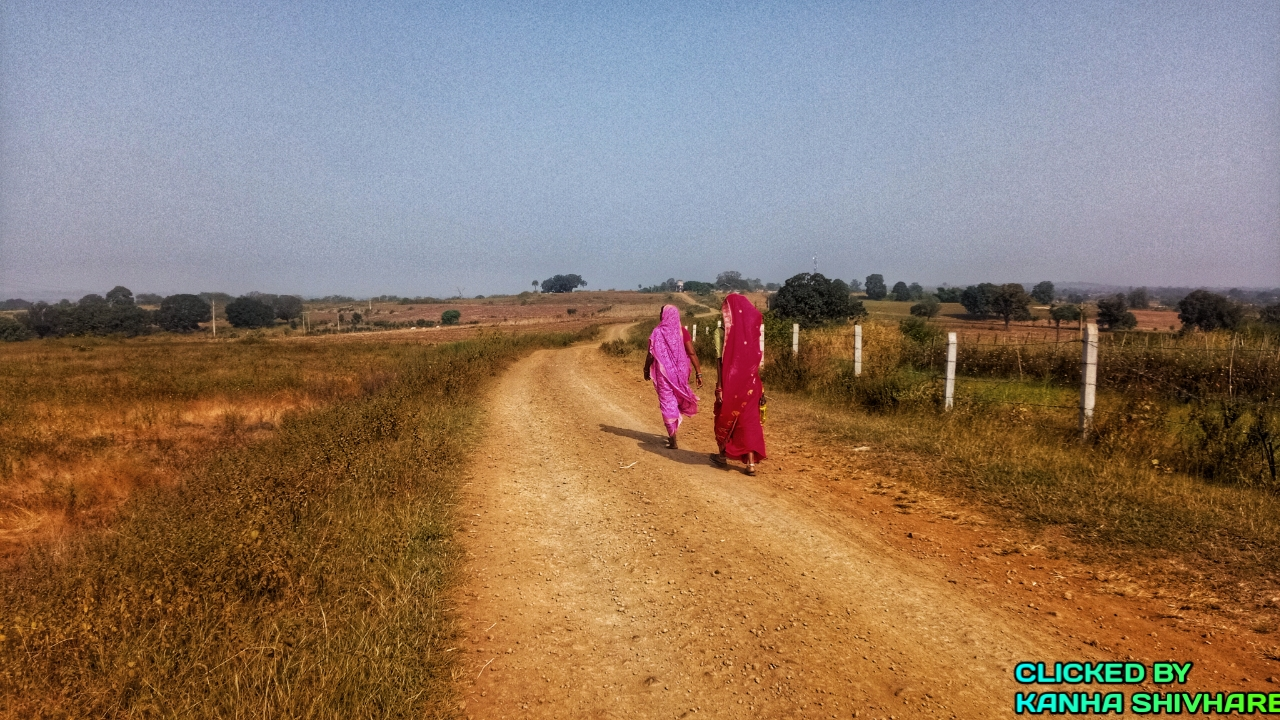
Village Street of mehta in seoni district

=== Languages ===
Languages spoken by district Hindi 30–40% 40–50% 50–60% 60–70% 80–90% 90–100% Rajasthani languages 40–50% 50–60% 90–100% Bhil languages 40–50% 80–90% Bundeli 60–80% 70–80% 80–90% Bagheli 60–70% 70–80%

Languages in Madhya Pradesh (2011)
1. Hindi (68.0%)
2. Malvi (6.44%)
3. Bundeli (5.92%)
4. Bagheli (3.62%)
5. Nimadi (3.16%)
6. Bhili (2.50%)
7. Marathi (1.70%)
8. Gondi (1.60%)
9. Bareli (1.36%)
10. Urdu (1.26%)
11. Bhilali (1.03%)
12. Others (3.45%)

The official language of the state is Hindi, which is spoken by over two-thirds of the population and is used for all government business. In urban areas Standard Hindi is the main language, while Urdu is spoken by Muslims. In rural areas, however, many niche languages are counted as Hindi dialects in the census despite not being mutually intelligible. In the west Malvi and Nimadi are spoken in the Malwa and Nimar regions respectively, which are more closely related to the Rajasthani languages. In north Bundelkhand and east Baghelkhand respectively, Bundeli and Bagheli are spoken, which are similar to Awadhi and Chhattisgarhi. In the southeast Chhattisgarhi is dominant and Powari is the main language of the southern part of the state. Most speakers of these languages consider them to be dialects of Hindi and so report their language as 'Hindi' on the census.

Marathi is another significant language. Due to Maratha rule over much of what is now Madhya Pradesh, Madhya Pradesh is home to the largest number of Marathis outside Maharashtra. Although large numbers of Marathis can be found in urban centres like Indore, the highest concentrations are in the southern areas of the state adjoining Maharashtra. Marathi is the most-spoken language in Burhanpur district, while it is a major minority language in the southern parts of Mahakoshal especially Betul, Chhindwara and Balaghat districts.

There are several languages spoken by the Adivasis. The various Bhil languages are Indo-Aryan languages spoken by 50 lakh Bhils of western Madhya Pradesh. Although many, especially in the eastern parts of their range, have adopted the regional languages as mother tongue, the languages are still strong in the far-western hills especially Barwani, Jhabua and Alirajpur districts where they are in the majority. Bhili, the Bareli languages and Bhilali are the major varieties spoken in the state.

Gondi is the second-largest Adivasi language, spoken by 11 lakh Gonds in the state. A Dravidian language related to Telugu, it is mainly spoken in the southern Satpura highlands of Mahakoshal, where it is spoken with the regional languages. Some in the more remote valleys of the Satpuras speak a poorly-described Dravidian dialect called Bharia. Smaller minorities of Gondi speakers can be found in Khandwa and Dewas districts in the west as well as Anuppur, Sidhi and Singrauli districts in the east. Elsewhere in the state, the Gonds have almost totally abandoned their original language.

Korku, a Munda language, has over 400,000 speakers in the central highlands of the state. In the far-southeast of Burhanpur can be found some speakers of the language isolate Nihali who live among the Korku. All speakers of tribal languages face significant pressure to switch to the dominant regional languages while their own tongues are considered 'backward' and 'rural'.

The following languages are taught in schools in Madhya Pradesh under the Three Language Formula:

First language: Any Scheduled Language or English

Second language: Hindi, Urdu or English

Third language: Another Scheduled Language (often Sanskrit) or Foreign Languages (like German or French)

=== Religion ===
Religion in Madhya Pradesh (2011)
1. Hinduism (90.9%)
2. Islam (6.57%)
3. Jainism (0.78%)
4. Buddhism (0.30%)
5. Christianity (0.29%)
6. Sikhism (0.21%)
7. Others (1.07%)

According to the census of 2011, 90.9% of residents followed Hinduism, while minorities are Muslim (6.6%), Jain (0.8%), Buddhists (0.3%), Christians (0.3%), and Sikhs (0.2%). Madhya Pradesh is home to several pilgrimage sites including Amarkantak at the source of the Narmada and the Ghats of Omkareshwar, also on the Narmada. Temples can be found throughout the state. Buddhism and Jainism were once prominent religions in the state, especially in the central plateau near Raisen and Bhopal. Malwa is still home to a significant Jain minority. Jains are particularly concentrated in the urban centres of the Malwa region. Islam arrived with Muslim rule in the 14th century, although its influence was and is limited to major urban centres. Islam is a major religion in Bhopal and Burhanpur, and Bhopal is home to many prominent Islamic shrines. Buddhism in modern times is mainly practised by Marathis in the south. Most respondents who answered 'Other' self-identified as following Adivasi religions such as Koya Punem of the Gonds.

Religious composition of Madhya Pradesh
Religion	2011 Population	%
Hinduism	66,007,121	90.89
Islam	4,774,695	6.57
Jainism	567,028	0.78
Buddhism	216,052	0.30
Christianity	213,282	0.29
Sikhism	151,412	0.21
Other religions and persuasions	599,594	0.83
Religion not stated	97,625	0.13
Total	72,597,565	100

== Culture ==
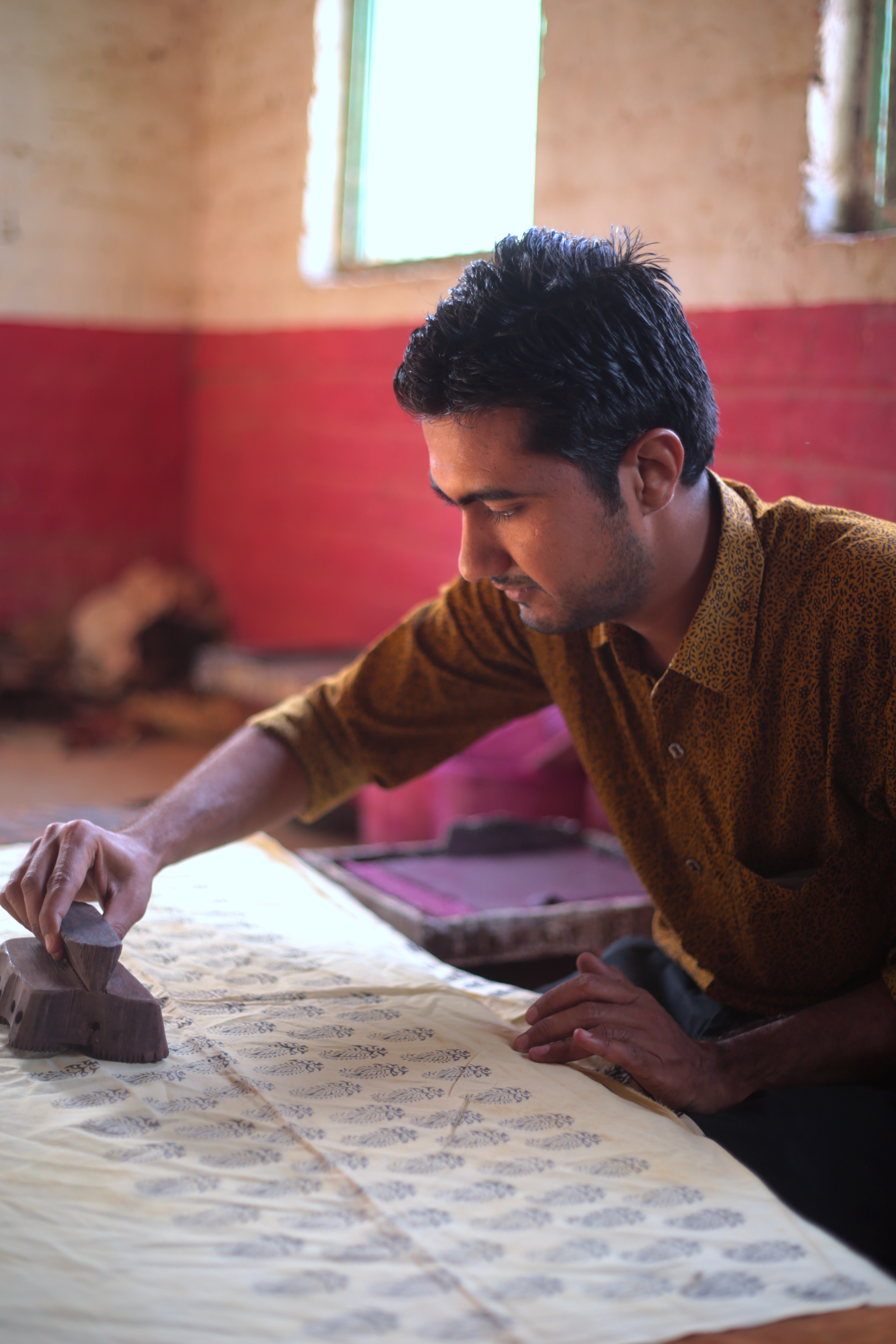
Bagh Print Traditional hand block print craft in Bagh.

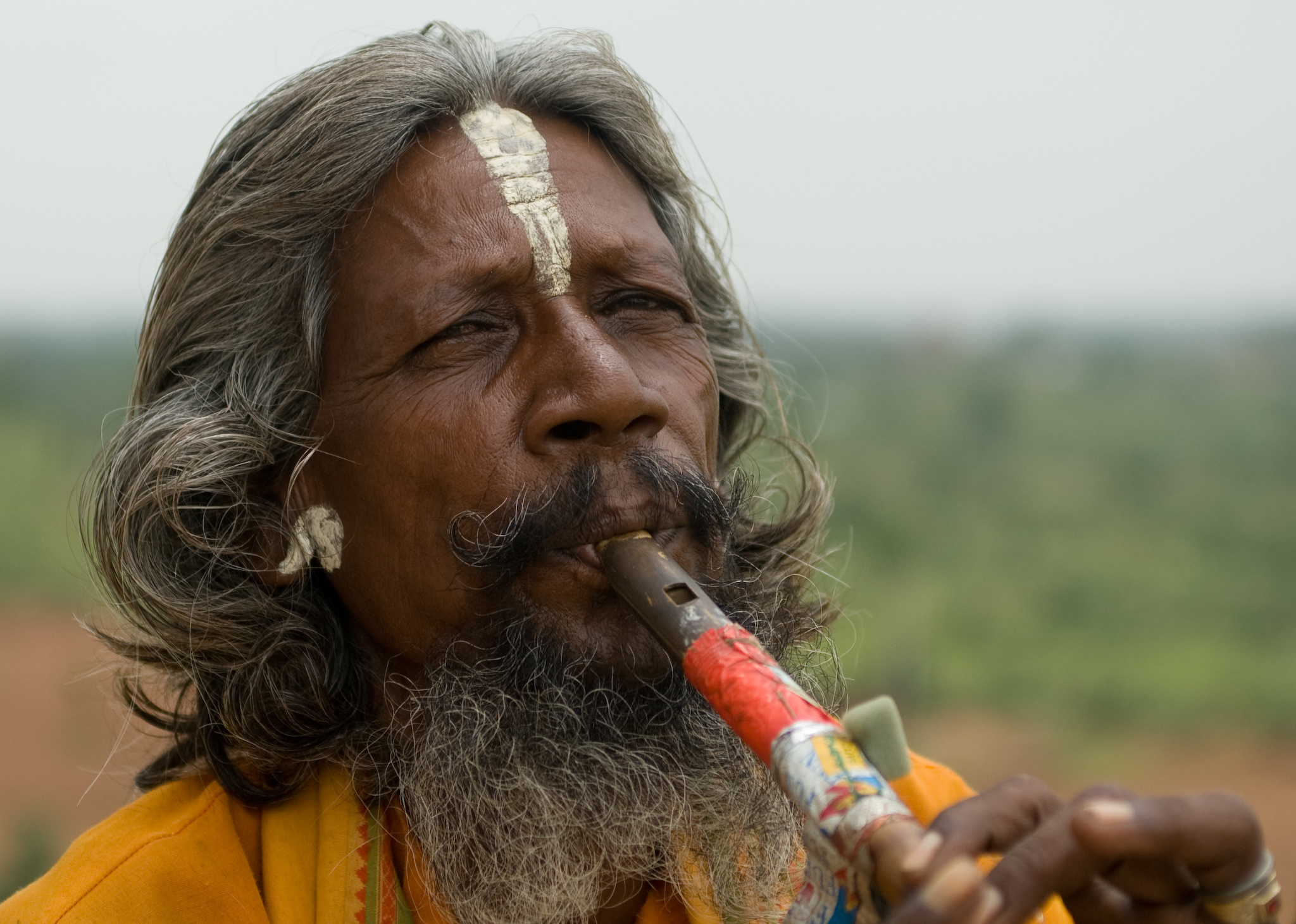
A man playing flute in Orchha, with a white tilak on his forehead, and holy saffron-coloured clothes.

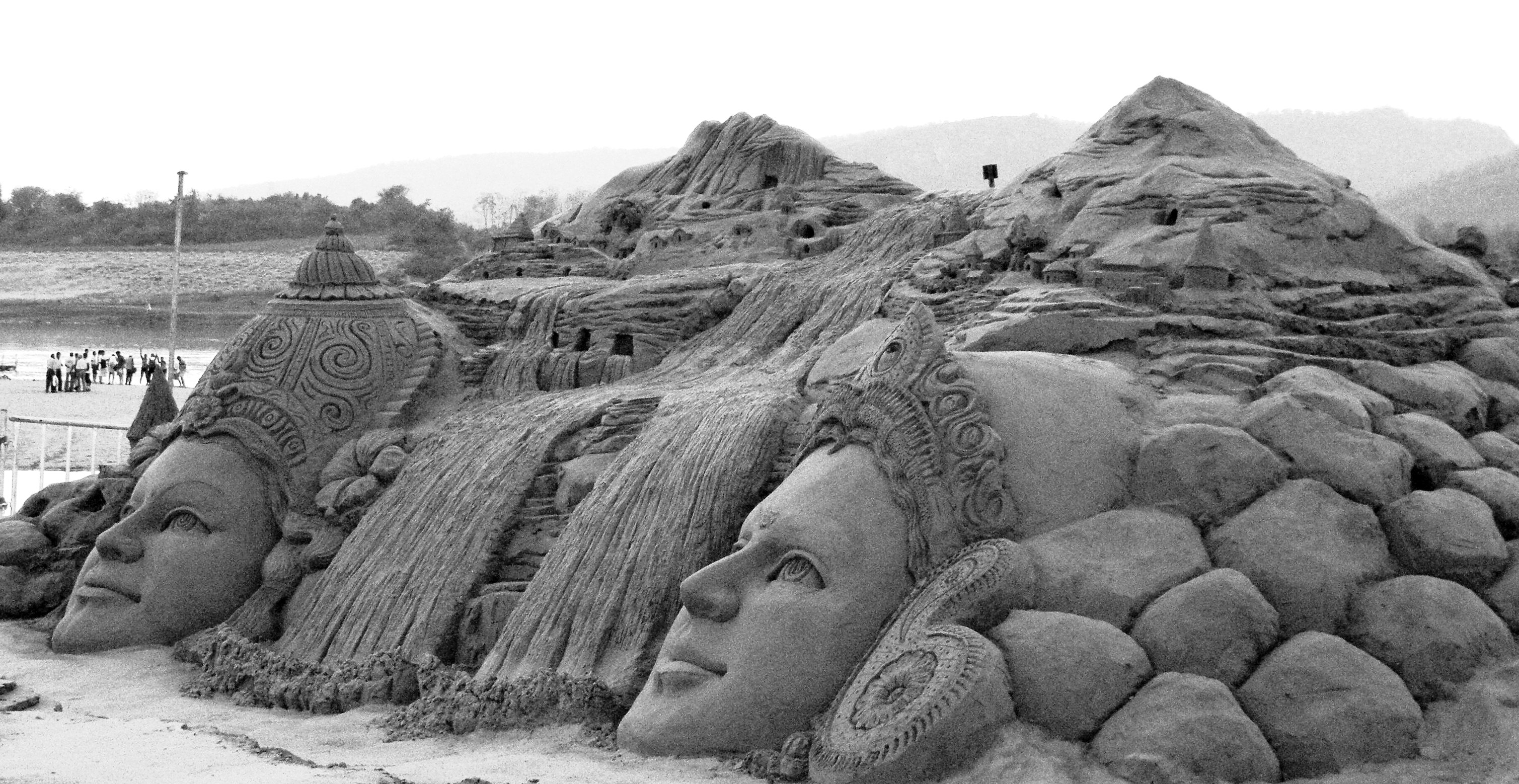
Sand sculpture by Sudarshan Pattnaik at Bandrabhan near Narmadapuram

Three sites in Madhya Pradesh have been declared World Heritage Sites by UNESCO: the Khajuraho Group of Monuments (1986) including Devi Jagadambi temple, Khajuraho, Buddhist Monuments at Sanchi (1989) and the Rock Shelters of Bhimbetka (2003). Other architecturally significant or scenic sites include Ajaigarh, Amarkantak, Asirgarh, Bandhavgarh, Bawangaja, Bhopal, Vidisha, Chanderi, Chitrakuta, Dewas, Dhar, Gwalior, Indore, Nemavar, Jabalpur, Burhanpur, Maheshwar, Mandleshwar, Mandu, Omkareshwar, Orchha, Pachmarhi, Shivpuri, Sonagiri, Mandla and Ujjain.

Madhya Pradesh is noted for its classical and folk music. In 2023, UNESCO declared Gwalior as the City of Music. Some of the noted Hindustani classical music gharanas in Madhya Pradesh include the Gwalior gharana, the Maihar gharana and Senia gharana. Gwalior is also known as the capital of Hindustani classical Music. Many of the medieval India's most noted sufi and mustic singers like Muhammed Ghaus Gwaliori, Tansen and Baiju Bawra, were born in Gwalior. Noted Dhrupad exponents Aminuddin Dagar (Indore), Gundecha Brothers (Ujjain) and Uday Bhawalkar (Ujjain) were also born in present-day Madhya Pradesh. Renowned classical singer Kumar Gandharva spent his life at Dewas. The birthplaces of noted playback singers Kishore Kumar (Khandwa) and Lata Mangeshkar (Indore) and singer and composer Aadesh Shrivastava (Jabalpur) are also located in MP. The local styles of folk singing are Faga, Bhartahari, Sanja geet, Bhopa, Kalbelia, Bhat, Bhand, Vasdeva, Videsia, Kalgi Turra, Nirgunia, Alha, Pandwani Gayan and Garba Garbi Govalan. Annual Tansen Music Festival is organised by the MP Tourism Board in Gwalior.

The major folk dances of MP are Rai, Karma, Saila, Matki, Gangaur, Badhai, Baredi, Naurata, Ahiri and Bhagoria.

== Economy ==
Matang was completely developed and manufactured by Vehicle Factory Jabalpur

Madhya Pradesh's gross state domestic product (nominal GDP) for 2013–14 was ₹ 4,509 billion (approximately US$ 72,726,000,000). The per-capita figure was US$ 871.45 in 2013–14, the sixth-lowest in the country. Between 1999 and 2008, the annualised growth rate of the state was very low: 3.5%. Subsequently, the state's GDP growth rate has improved significantly, rising to 8% during 2010–11 and 12% during 2011–12.

The state has an agrarian economy. The major crops of Madhya Pradesh are wheat, soybean, gram, sugarcane, rice, maize, cotton, rapeseed, mustard and arhar. Minor Forest Produce (MFP), such as tendu leaves used to roll beedi, sal seed, teak seed, and lak also contribute to state's rural economy.

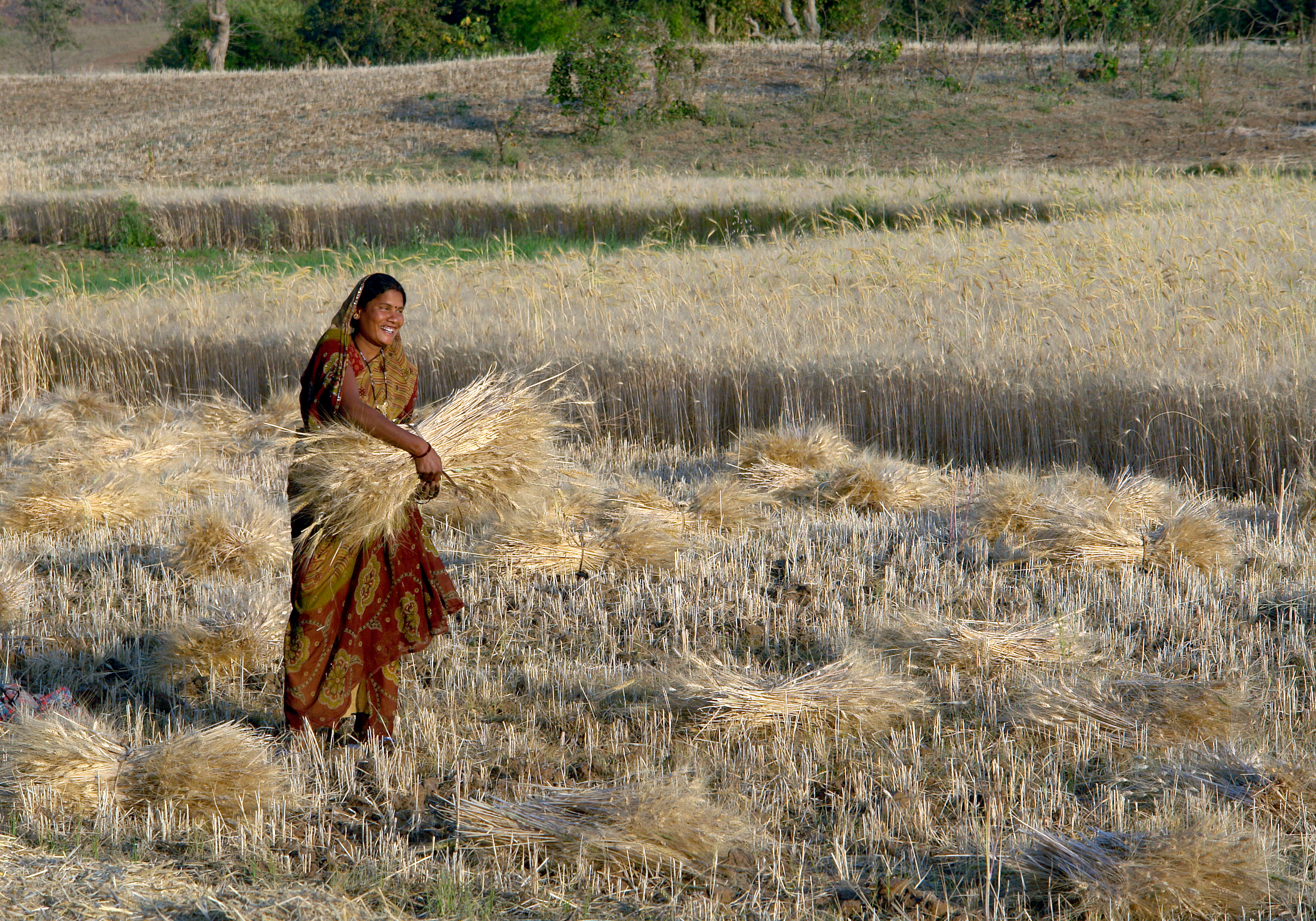
Woman harvesting wheat, Raisen district

Madhya Pradesh has 5 Special Economic Zones (SEZs): 3 IT/ITeS (Indore, Gwalior), 1 mineral-based (Jabalpur) and 1 agro-based (Jabalpur). In October 2011, approval was given to 14 proposed SEZs, out of which 10 were IT/ITeS-based. Indore is the major commercial centre of the state. Because of the state's central location, a number of consumer goods companies have established manufacturing bases in MP.

The state has the largest reserves of diamond and copper in India. Other major mineral reserves include those of coal, coalbed methane, manganese and dolomite.

Madhya Pradesh has six Ordnance Factories, four of which are located at Jabalpur (Vehicle Factory, Grey Iron Foundry, Gun Carriage Factory, Ordnance Factory Khamaria) and one each at Katni and Itarsi. The factories are run by the Ordnance Factories Board, and manufacture a variety of products for the Indian Armed Forces.

There are two major Security Press Units of Security Printing and Minting Corporation of India Limited presently operating in the state. The first unit is situated in Dewas. Also known as Bank Note Press (BNP). It is an industrial unit of SPMCIL, established in the year 1974 is wholly owned by Government of India, Ministry of Finance and Department of Economic Affairs. BNP Dewas prints Indian Currency Notes (known as Indian rupee or INR; Symbol: '₹') of denominations ₹50, ₹100, ₹500 and ₹2000 and is capable of printing Bank Notes of any denomination. There is also a specialised Security Ink Factory at BNP Dewas which supplies specialised inks for currency and other government approved documents.

The second unit is a Security Paper Mill was established in 1968 at Hoshangabad. It produces papers for banknotes and non–judicial stamps and further prints with new enhanced unit.

Madhya Pradesh won the 10th National Award for excellent work in Mahatma Gandhi National Rural Employment Guarantee Act, 2005.

The state's tourism industry is growing, fuelled by wildlife tourism and a number of places of historical and religious significance. Gwalior, Sanchi and Khajuraho are frequented by external tourists. Along with cities like Bhedaghat, Jabalpur, Bhimbetka, Bhojpur, Maheshwar, Mandu, Orchha, Pachmarhi, Kanha, Amarkantak and Ujjain, Tumen Vindhyavasini temple ancient temple. This south facing Ashok Nagar district located in Tuman (Tumvn).

== Infrastructure ==
=== Energy ===
Power generation in MP (31 March 2026)
Power	Capacity (MW)
Thermal	21,170.00
Renewable	9,947.64
Hydro	2,235.00
Nuclear	0.0

The state has a total installed power generation capacity of 33352.64 MW as of 31 March 2026. The Madhya Pradesh Electric Board is located at Jabalpur. The Rewa Ultra Mega Solar project is a photovoltaic solar park spread over an area of 1,590 acres (6.4 km^{2}) in the Gurh tehsil of Rewa District of Madhya Pradesh. The project was commissioned with 750 MW capacity. 97% households have electricity access in the state.

The Singrauli region on the eastern end of Madhya Pradesh is a major energy producer enclave for the country. The region has vast reserves of coal mines, which are excavated by Northern Coalfields Limited, a subsidiary of Coal India Limited, which is in turn used in local power plants of NTPC, Sasan Power and Hindalco. The area has more than 10,000 MW installed capacity for energy production.

The region of Malwa were selected to establish Wind Energy Production units by State Government. Constant wind flows in the region are suitable for harvesting wind energy. There are more than 100 wind mills on a series of hills 13 km (8.1 mi) from Dewas, generating more than 30 megawatts of power. These were financed by a few private companies which sought a reliable power supply.

=== Transport ===
Road network of Madhya Pradesh
Road type	Length (in km)
National Highways	8,772
State Highways	11,000
Major District Roads	19,241

Bus and train services cover most of Madhya Pradesh. The 99,043-kilometre-long (61,542 mi) road network of the state includes 20 national highways. A 4,948-kilometre-long (3,075 mi) rail network criss-crosses the state, with Jabalpur serving as headquarters for the West Central Railway Zone of the Indian Railways. The Central Railway and the Western Railway also cover parts of the state. Most of the western Madhya Pradesh comes under Ratlam Rail Division of Western Railways, including cities like Indore, Ujjain, Dewas, Mandsaur, Khandwa, Neemuch and Bairagarh in Bhopal. The state has a total of 20 major railway junctions. More than 455 trains transit through Madhya Pradesh daily. 220 trains transit through the State's capital Bhopal alone. North–South & East–West corridors cut across Madhya Pradesh, including the New Delhi–Chennai main line.

The inter-state bus terminals are located in Bhopal, Gwalior, Indore and Jabalpur. More than 2,000 buses are conducted daily from these four cities. The intra-city transit systems mostly consist of buses, private autos and taxis. There is convenient access to major ports such as Kandla port and Jawaharlal Nehru port in the state The state does not have a coastline, but is home to 5 functional ICD's (Inland/Dry Ports) which provide facilities to clear and load cargoes directly for dispatch within the state, they are located in Bhopal, Indore and Gwalior. Most of the sea trade happens through the Kandla and Jawaharlal Nehru Port (Nhava Sheva) in the neighbouring states, which are well-connected to MP by road and rail networks.

Devi Ahilyabai Holkar Airport in Indore is the busiest airport in Madhya Pradesh, followed by Raja Bhoj International Airport in the state capital of Bhopal.

Rajmata Vijayaraje Scindia Airport, Gwalior is the largest and the oldest airport of Madhya Pradesh. It is one and only airport in central India having two parallel take off runways.

Dumna Airport in Jabalpur and Khajuraho Airport also have scheduled commercial passenger services. Rewa Airport is under construction with operations expected to start by 2025. Besides these, minor airstrips are located at Chhindwara, Sagar, Neemuch, Ratlam, Mandsaur, Ujjain, Khandwa, Guna and Satna.

=== Other ===
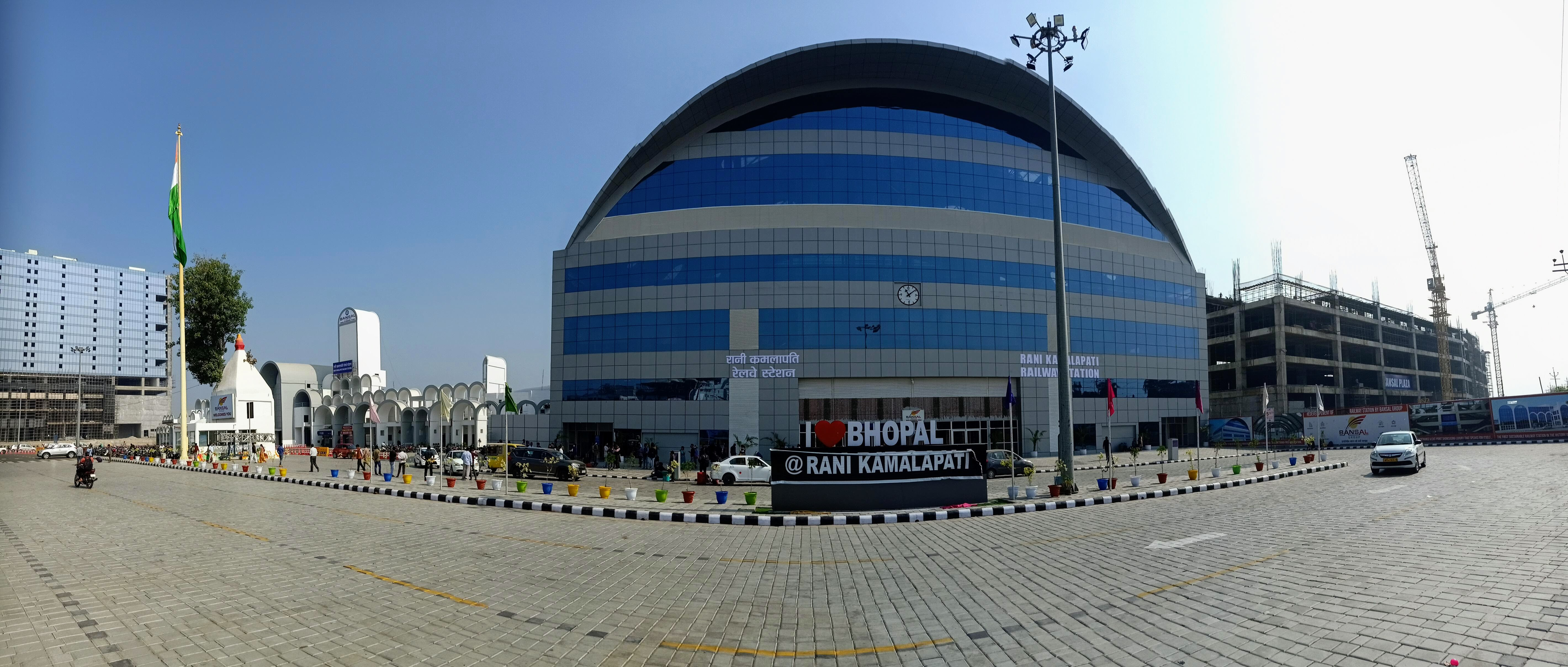
Rani Kamalapati Railway Station

The state has 55 districts hospitals, 333 community health centres, 1,155 primary health centres and 8,860 sub-centres.

The urban infrastructure has improved considerably in the past decade. 22 projects costing above $500 million have been sanctioned under the Jawaharlal Nehru National Urban Renewal Mission for the development of Bhopal, Indore, Jabalpur and Ujjain.

Seven Cities of Madhya Pradesh Bhopal, Indore, Gwalior, Jabalpur, Satna, Ujjain, and Sagar have been selected under Smart Cities Mission Indore has been part of the Swachh Survekshan Cleanliness Program initiated by Government of India. It has been ranked as India's cleanest city seven years in a row as per the Swachh Survekshan for the years 2017, 2018, 2019, 2020, 2021, 2022 and 2023.

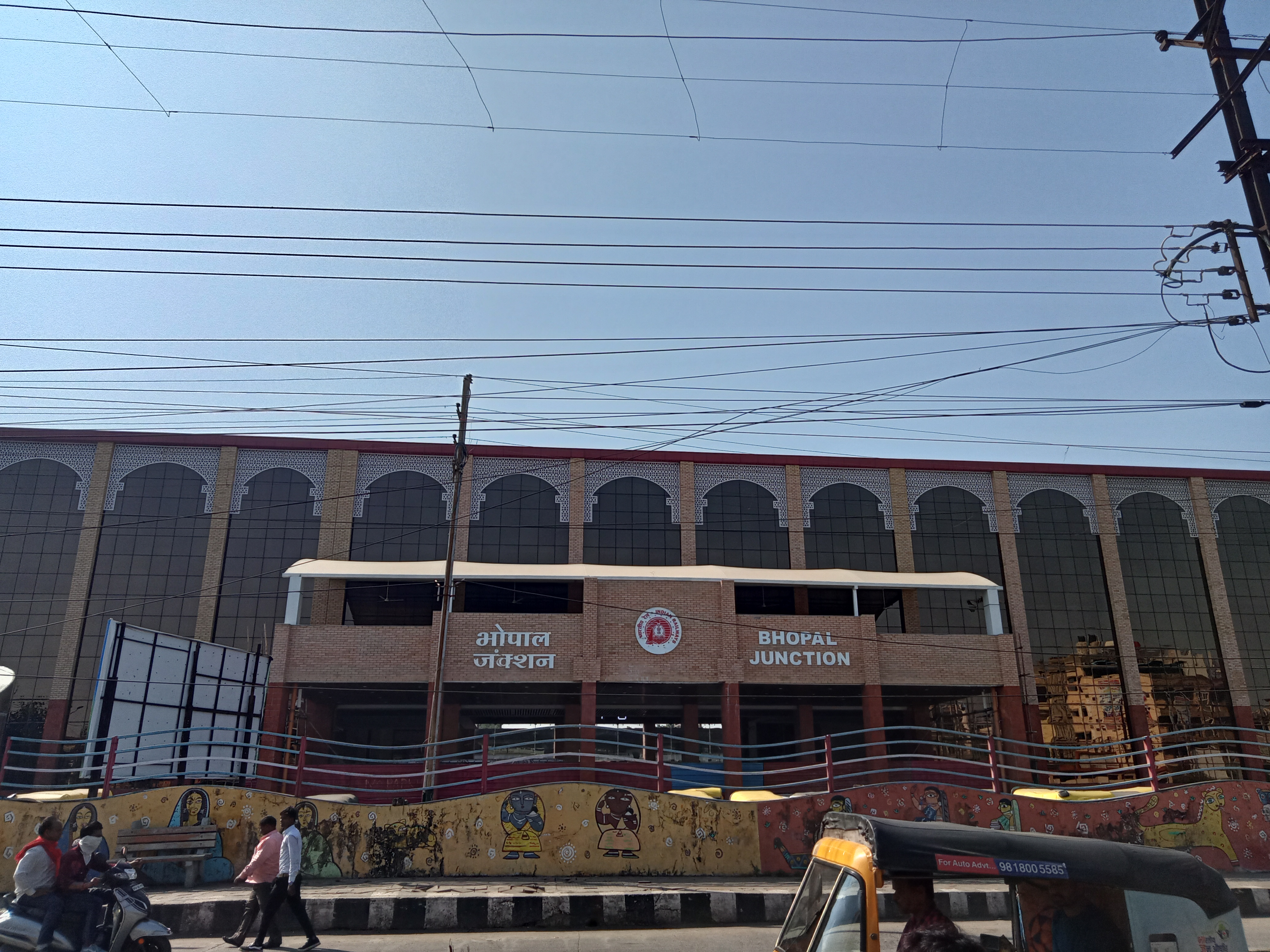
Bhopal Junction Railway station

Gwalior has been globally recognised by the UNESCO as the City of Music of India.

=== Media ===
Dainik Bhaskar, Dainik Jagran, The Indian Observer, Nava Bharat, Deshbandhu, Nai Duniya, Rajasthan Patrika, Raj Express and Dainik Dabang Dunia are the leading Hindi newspapers. Other local newspapers are published in the cities. In English Times of India, Hindustan Times, The Hitavada, Central Chronicle and Free Press have editions from Bhopal with The Hitavada also being in Jabalpur. A Sindhi daily, i.e., Challenge (Now also in Hindi) is published from Bhopal is the only Sindhi newspaper in state.

== Government and politics ==
Madhya Pradesh has a 230-seat state legislative assembly. The state also sends 40 members to the Parliament of India: 29 are elected to the Lok Sabha (Lower House) and 11 to the Rajya Sabha (Upper House). The constitutional head of the state is the Governor, appointed by the President of India. The executive powers lie with the Chief Minister, who is the elected leader of the state legislature. The current governor is Mangubhai C. Patel, and the current chief minister is Mohan Yadav of the Bharatiya Janata Party (BJP).

The political scenario of Madhya pradesh can be defines as below:

Post-Independence (1950s–1970s): The Indian National Congress (INC) held power for a significant period, with leaders like Ravishankar Shukla and Kailash Nath Katju as Chief Ministers. However, parties like Bharatiya Jana Sangh (BJS) – the precursor to BJP – started gaining ground in the 1960s.

Shifting Tides (1980s–1990s): This era saw a rise in regional parties and national alternatives. Janata Party (JP), Janata Dal (JD), and Bahujan Samaj Party (BSP) challenged the INC's dominance for a while.

Bi-polar Politics (2000s–present): Since the early 2000s, a two-party system has emerged. BJP and INC have become the main contenders, with occasional forays by smaller parties.

The dominant political parties in the state are the Bharatiya Janata Party (BJP) and the Indian National Congress (INC).

== Administration ==
Madhya Pradesh state is made up of 55 Districts, which are grouped into 10 divisions. For revenue administration, Madhya Pradesh is divided into 10 divisions, 52 districts, 181 subdivisions, 371 tehsils, 11,622 patwari circles, and 56,346 villages..

As of 2023, the state has 51 jila (district) panchayats, 313 janpad panchayats/blocks, and 23043 gram (village) panchayats for rural governance. The municipalities in the state include 18 Nagar Nigams, 100 Nagar Palikas and 264 Nagar Panchayats.

The following is the list of Nagar Nigams (Municipal Corporations), which govern urban areas in Madhya Pradesh;

S/N	Corporation Name	City	District(s)	Area (km^{2})	Population (2011)	No. of Wards	Year Established	Last Election	Ruling Party	Website
1	Bhopal Municipal Corporation	Bhopal	Bhopal	463	1,886,100	85		2022	BJP	
2	Burhanpur Municipal Corporation	Burhanpur	Burhanpur	181.06	300,892			2022	BJP	
3	Chhindwara Municipal Corporation	Chhindwara	Chhindwara	110	234,784	48		2022	INC	
4	Dewas Municipal Corporation	Dewas	Dewas	50	289,438			2022	BJP	
5	Gwalior Municipal Corporation	Gwalior	Gwalior	414	20,32,036	66		2022	INC	
6	Indore Municipal Corporation	Indore	Indore	530	2,167,447	85		2022	BJP	
7	Jabalpur Municipal Corporation	Jabalpur	Jabalpur	263	1,268,848	79		2022	INC	
8	Katni Municipal Corporation	Katni	Katni		221,875			2022	Independent	
9	Khandwa Municipal Corporation	Khandwa	Khandwa		259,436			2022	BJP	
10	Morena Municipal Corporation	Morena	Morena	80	218,768			2022	INC	
11	Ratlam Municipal Corporation	Ratlam	Ratlam	39	273,892	49		2022	BJP	
12	Rewa Municipal Corporation	Rewa	Rewa	69	235,422	45		2022	INC	
13	Sagar Municipal Corporation	Sagar	Sagar	49.76	370,296			2022	BJP	
14	Satna Municipal Corporation	Satna	Satna	71	283,004			2022	BJP	
15	Singrauli Municipal Corporation	Singrauli	Singrauli		225,676			2022	AAP	
16	Ujjain Municipal Corporation	Ujjain	Ujjain	151.83	515,215	54		2022	BJP	

=== Villages ===
- Dhekal Badi

== Education ==
According to the 2011 census, Madhya Pradesh had a literacy rate of 69.32%. According to the 2009–10 figures, the state had 105,592 primary schools, 6,352 high schools, and 5,161 higher secondary schools. The state has 208 engineering and architecture colleges, 208 management institutes, and 12 medical colleges.

The state is home to some of the premier scientific educational and research institutions of India including IIT Indore, IIM Indore, AIIMS Bhopal, NIT Bhopal, IISER Bhopal, SPA Bhopal, IIIT Jabalpur, IIIT Gwalior.

Gajra Raja Medical College, Gwalior is the first and the oldest medical college in Madhya Pradesh that was established in 1946.

Other premier institutes include Indian Institute of Tourism and Travel Management (IITTM Gwalior), Indian Institute of Forest Management (IIFM) Bhopal, Institute of Hotel Management (IHM) Gwalior, National Law Institute University (NLIU) Bhopal, Lakshmi Bai National Institute of Physical Education, (LNIPE) Gwalior, Jabalpur Engineering College, Dharmashastra National Law University, Jabalpur and VIT University Bhopal.

The state has two central universities namely Dr. Hari Singh Gour University (Sagar) and Indira Gandhi National Tribal University (Amarkantak, Anuppur), while former being the first university of Madhya Pradesh.

There are 500 degree colleges, which are affiliated with one of the universities in the state. The specialised universities include Rajiv Gandhi Technical University, Madhya Pradesh Medical Science University, and Nanaji Deshmukh Veterinary Science University. The general universities are Barkatullah University (Bhopal), Devi Ahilya Vishwavidyalaya (Indore), Rani Durgavati University (Jabalpur), Vikram University (Ujjain), Masarovar Global University, Jiwaji University (Gwalior), Dr. Hari Singh Gour University (Sagar), Indira Gandhi National Tribal University (Amarkantak, Anuppur), Makhanlal Chaturvedi National University of Journalism and Communication (Bhopal).

Gwalior is home to the Scindia School (all boys private residential school) and the Scindia Kanya Vidyalaya (all girls private boarding school), which are among India's most expensive schools.

The Professional Examination Board was initialised as Pre Medical Test Board by Government of Madhya Pradesh in the year 1970. After some year in 1981, Pre Engineering Board was constituted. Then after, in the year 1982 both these boards were amalgamated and named as Madhya Pradesh Professional Examination Board (MPPEB).

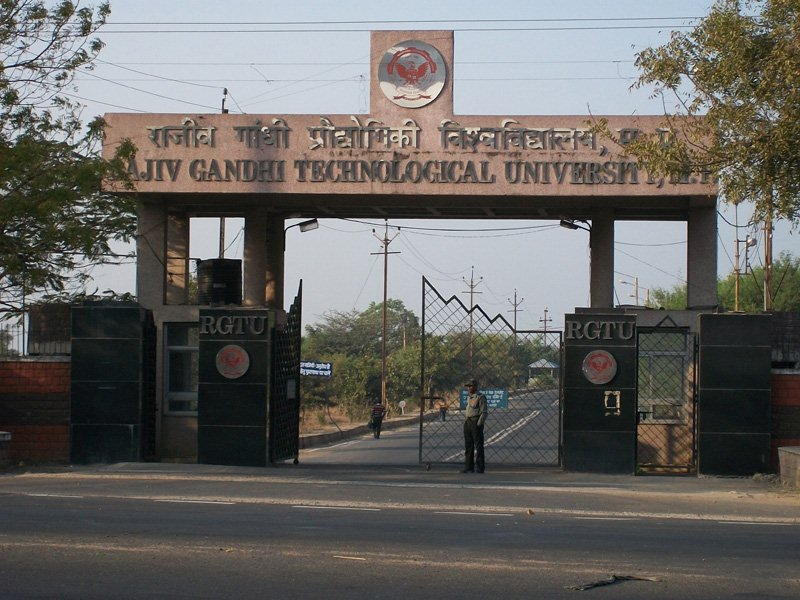
Rajiv Gandhi Technical University's main gate

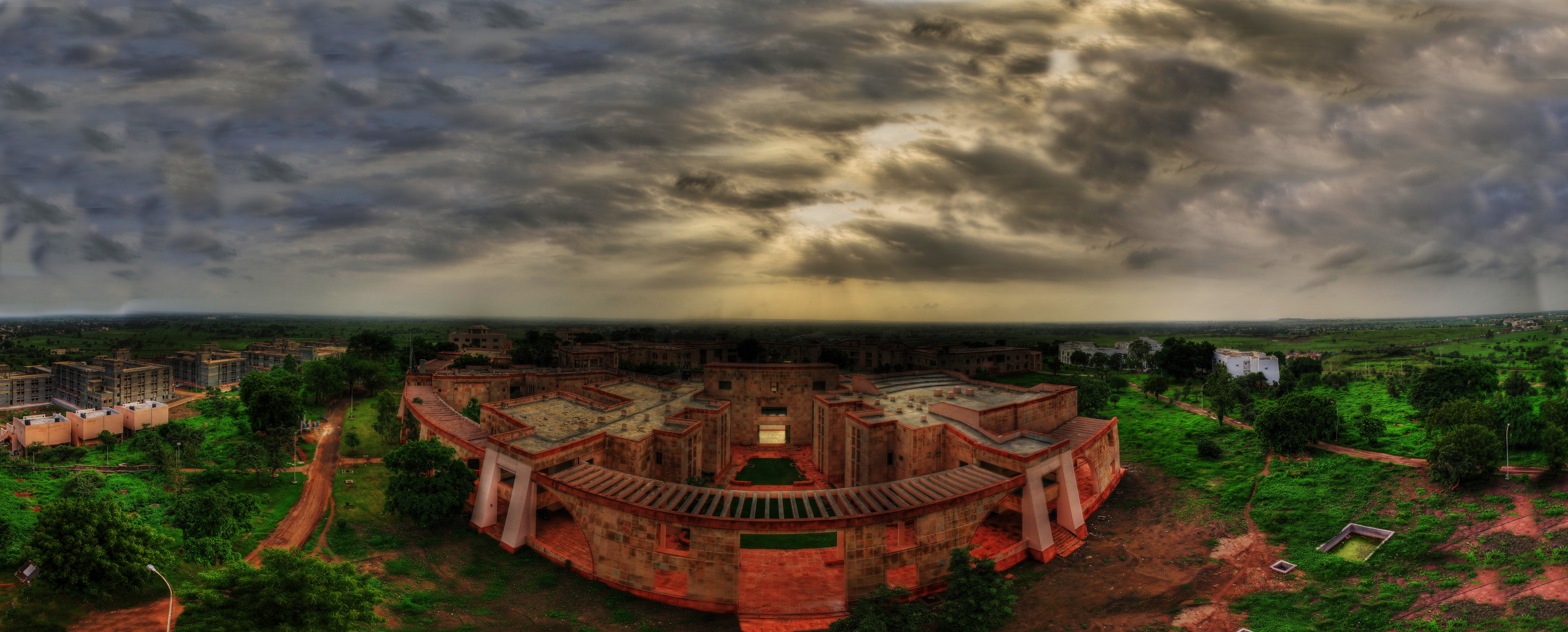
IIM Indore's aerial panoramic view

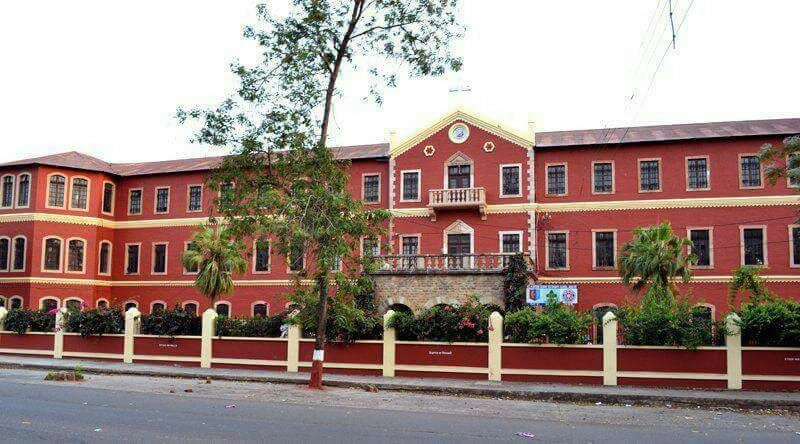
St. Aloysius Senior Secondary School, Jabalpur, established in the year 1868 is among the oldest schools in India

== Tourism ==
Madhya Pradesh Tourism promotes the central Indian state known as the “Heart of India” for its rich cultural heritage, wildlife, and natural beauty. It offers diverse attractions including UNESCO World Heritage Sites like Khajuraho, Bhimbetka and Sanchi, tiger reserves, historic forts like the Gwalior Fort, stunning Saas Bahu temples, Gwalior, and vibrant festivals, making it a major travel destination.

== Sports ==
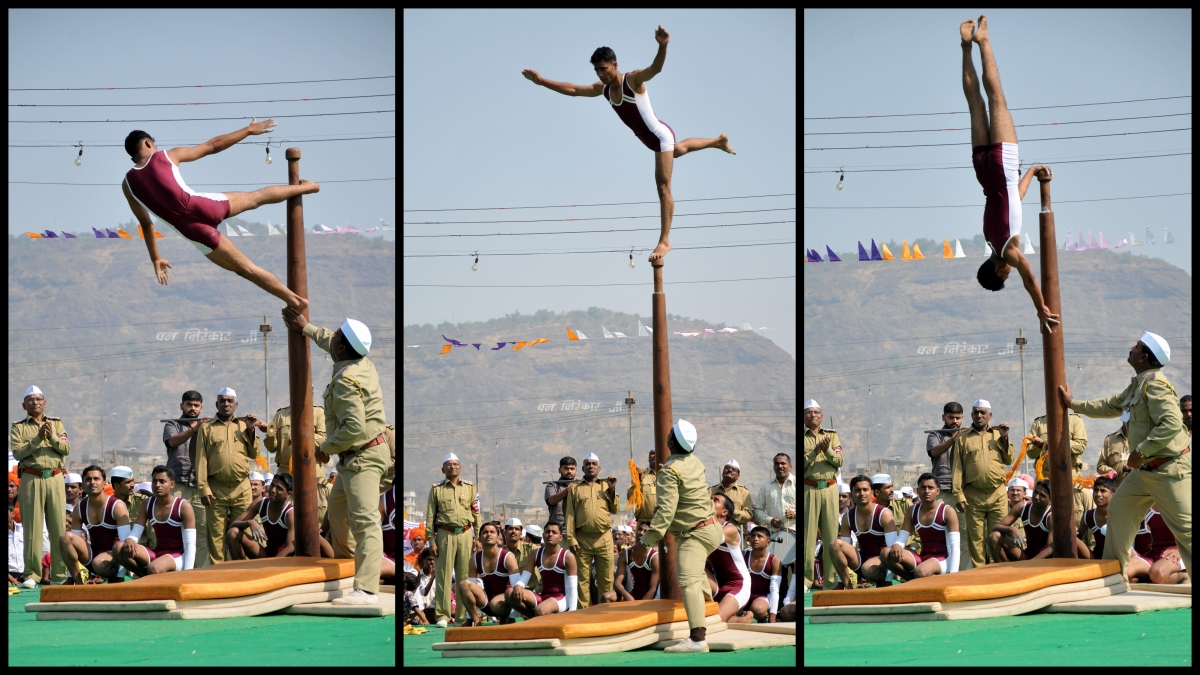
Performing Mallakhamba

In 2013, state govt declared Mallakhamba as the state sport.

Cricket, kabaddi, hockey, football, basketball, volleyball, cycling, swimming, badminton, and table tennis are the popular sports in the state. Traditional games like kho kho, gilli danda, sitoliya, kanche, and langdi are popular in the rural areas.

Snooker, a cue sport, generally regarded as having been invented in Jabalpur by British Army officers, is popular in many of the English-speaking and Commonwealth countries, with top professional players attaining multimillion-pound career earnings from the game.

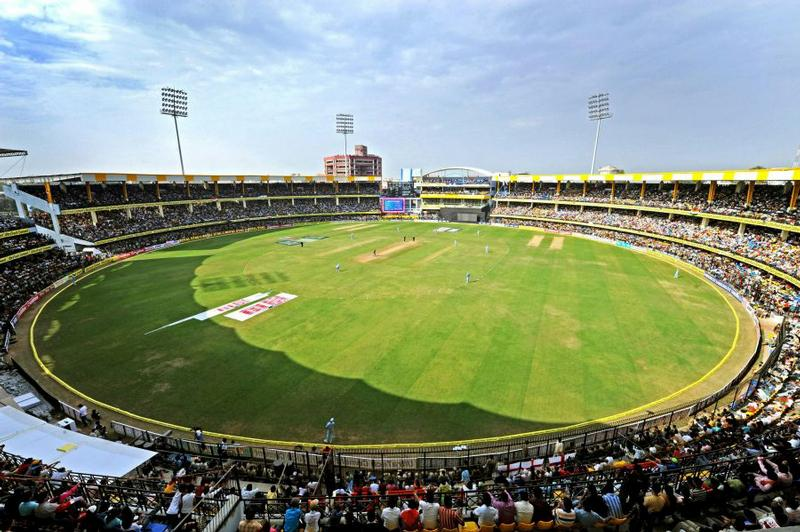
Holkar Stadium in Indore.

Cricket is the most popular sport in Madhya Pradesh. There are three international cricket stadiums in the state – Nehru Stadium (Indore), Captain Roop Singh Stadium (Gwalior), Holkar Cricket Stadium (Indore) and Madhavrao Scindia Cricket Stadium (Gwalior). Madhya Pradesh cricket team's best performances in Ranji Trophy was in 1998–99, when the Chandrakant Pandit-led team ended as the runner-up. Its predecessor, the Indore-based Holkar cricket team, had won the Ranji Trophy four times. In year 2022, Chandrakant Pandit coached Madhya Pradesh cricket team defeated 41-time champion Mumbai Cricket Team in Ranji Trophy 2021–22 season. It is Madhya Pradesh's maiden title at M. Chinnaswamy Stadium. Aishbagh Stadium in Bhopal is the home ground for World Series Hockey team Bhopal Badshahs. The state also has a football team that participates in the Santosh Trophy.

MP United FC is an Indian football that played in the 2nd Division I-League.

On 6 December 2017, the Madhya Pradesh Chief Minister Shivraj Singh Chouhan announced that players from the state would be given government jobs on winning medals in international events.

Madhu Yadav, the former Captain of the India women's national field hockey team, a 1982 Asian Games gold medallist and an Arjuna Award recipient, is from Jabalpur.

== See also ==
- Outline of Madhya Pradesh
- Directorate Sports and Youth Welfare
- Districts of Madhya Pradesh
- List of forts in Madhya Pradesh
- List of people from Madhya Pradesh
- 2025 Indore drinking water contamination
