= List of municipal corporations in India =

Under the Seventy-fourth Amendment of the Constitution of India, local governments of cities with a population of 100,000 and above are known as municipal corporations.

This is a list of municipal corporations in every state or union territory based on the 2011 Census of India.

Note: The list includes the city municipal limits, but not urban agglomeration or municipalities.

A total of 279 municipal corporations are listed here.

== Andhra Pradesh ==
#	Corporation Name	District	Area (km^{2})	Population (2011)	No. of Wards	Year Established	Last Election	Ruling Party	Website
1	Visakhapatnam	Visakhapatnam & Anakapalli	681.96	2,035,922	120	1979	01 November 2026	TDP	
2	Vijayawada	NTR	61.88	1,448,240	64	1981	01 November 2026	TDP	
3	Guntur	Guntur	168.04	743,354	57	1994	01 November 2026	TDP	
4	Nellore	SPS Nellore	149.2	600,869	54	2004	01 November 2026	TDP	
5	Kurnool	Kurnool	69.51	460,184	52	1994	01 November 2026	TDP	
6	Kadapa	YSR Kadapa	164.08	341,823	50	2004	01 November 2026	TDP	
7	Tirupati	Tirupati	27.44	287,035	50	2007	01 November 2026	TDP	
8	Ongole	Prakasam	132.45	252,739	50	2012	01 November 2026	TDP	
9	Vizianagaram	Vizianagaram	29.27	244,598	50	1988	01 November 2026	TDP	
10	Chittoor	Chittoor	95.97	189,000	50	2012	01 November 2026	TDP	
11	Eluru	Eluru	154	283,648	50	2005	01 November 2026	JSP	
12	Machilipatnam	Krishna	95.35	189,979	50	2015	01 November 2026	JSP	
13	Anantapur	Anantapur	15.98	262,340	50	1950	01 November 2026	YSRCP	
14	Rajamahendravaram	East Godavari	44.50	343,903	50	1980	26 November 2026	vacant	
15	Mangalagiri Tadepalli	Guntur	194.41	320,020	50	2021	26 November 2026	vacant	
16	Kakinada	Kakinada	30.51	312,255	50	2004	26 November 2026	vacant	
17	Srikakulam	Srikakulam	20.89	147,936	50	2015	26 November 2026	vacant	

== Bihar ==
List of urban local bodies in Bihar

#	Corporation Name	District	Area (km^{2})	Population (2011)	No. of Wards	Year Established	Last Election	Ruling Party	Website
1	Patna	Patna	108.87	2,079,000	75	1952	2022	Non-partisan IND	
2	Gaya	Gaya	50.17	578,000	53	1983	2022	Non-partisan IND	
3	Bhagalpur	Bhagalpur	30.17	494,000	51	1981	2022	Non-partisan IND	
4	Muzaffarpur	Muzaffarpur	32.00	438,000	49	1981	2022	Non-partisan IND	
5	Bihar Sharif	Nalanda	23.50	367,000	46	2007	2022	Non-partisan IND	
6	Darbhanga	Darbhanga	19.18	365,000	48	1982	2022	Non-partisan IND	
7	Purnia	Purnia		348,000	46	2009	2022	Non-partisan IND	
8	Arrah	Bhojpur	30.97	323,000	45	2007	2022	Non-partisan IND	
9	Begusarai	Begusarai		311,000	45	2010	2022	Non-partisan IND	
10	Katihar	Katihar	33.46	279,000	45	2009	2022	Non-partisan IND	
11	Munger	Munger		263,000	45	2009	2022	Non-partisan IND	
12	Samastipur	Samastipur		256,156	47	2020	2022	Non-partisan IND	
13	Chhapra	Saran	16.96	250,000	45	2017	2022	Non-partisan IND	
14	Saharsa	Saharsa		193,000	41	2021	2022	Non-partisan IND	
15	Sasaram	Rohtas		182,000	48	2020	2022	Non-partisan IND	
16	Madhubani	Madhubani	46.56	164,156	30	2020	2022	Non-partisan IND	
17	Bettiah	West Champaran	11.63	163,000	40	2020	2022	Non-partisan IND	
18	Motihari	East Champaran		156,000	46	2020	2022	Non-partisan IND	
19	Sitamarhi	Sitamarhi	66.19	150,000	46	2021	2022	Non-partisan IND	

== Chhattisgarh ==
#	Corporation Name	District	Area (km^{2})	Population (2011)	No. of Wards	Year Established	Last Election	Ruling Party	Website
1	Raipur	Raipur	226	1,010,087	70	1973	2025	BJP	
2	Bilaspur	Bilaspur	137	689,154	70	2009	2025	BJP	
3	Jagdalpur	Bastar	193	325,345	60		2025	BJP	
4	Durg	Durg	182	268,679			2025	BJP	
5	Korba	Korba	90	263,210	67		2025	BJP	
6	Rajnandgaon	Rajnandgaon	70	163,122			2025	BJP	
7	Raigarh	Raigarh		137,097			2025	BJP	
8	Ambikapur	Surguja	35.36	114,575			2025	BJP	
9	Dhamtari	Dhamtari	34.94	108,500			2025	BJP	
10	Chirmiri	Koriya		101,378			2025	BJP	
11	Bhilai	Durg	158	625,697	70		2021	INC	
12	Birgaon	Raipur	96.29	108,491			2021	INC	
13	Risali	Durg	104	10,5000		2020	2021	INC	
14	Bhilai Charoda	Durg	190	98,008			2021	INC	

== Goa ==
#	Corporation Name	District	Area (km^{2})	Population (2011)	No. of Wards	Year Established	Last Election	Ruling Party	Website
1	Panaji	North Goa	08.27	40,000	30	2016	2026	Non-partisan	

== Gujarat ==
#	Corporation Name	District	Area (km^{2})	Population (2011)	No. of Wards	Year Established	Last Election	Ruling Party	Website
1	Ahmedabad	Ahmedabad	530	8,253,455	48	1950	26 April 2026	BJP	
2	Surat	Surat	462.14	7,490,598	30	1966	26 April 2026	BJP	
3	Vadodara	Vadodara	220.60	3,522,221	19	1950	26 April 2026	BJP	
4	Rajkot	Rajkot	163.21	1,934,975	18	1973	26 April 2026	BJP	
5	Bhavnagar	Bhavnagar	119	771,365	13	2004	26 April 2026	BJP	
6	Jamnagar	Jamnagar	125	682,302	16	1981	26 April 2026	BJP	
7	Junagadh	Junagadh	160	415,838	20	2002	2025	BJP	
8	Gandhinagar	Gandhinagar	326	410,618	13	2010	2026	BJP	
9	Anand	Anand	90.17	412,106	13	2025	26 April 2026	BJP	
10	Nadiad	Kheda	78.55	385,979	13	2025	26 April 2026	BJP	
11	Mehsana	Mehsana	79.94	320,000	12	2025	26 April 2026	BJP	
12	Navsari	Navsari	41.71	367,000	13	2025	26 April 2026	BJP	
13	Surendranagar	Surendranagar	58.60	329,000	12	2025	26 April 2026	BJP	
14	Morbi	Morbi	46.58	327,000	13	2025	26 April 2026	BJP	
15	Gandhidham	Kutch	63.49	322,000	13	2025	26 April 2026	BJP	
16	Porbandar	Porbandar	60	300,000	13	2025	26 April 2026	BJP	
17	Vapi	Valsad	80	350,000	12	2025	26 April 2026	BJP	

== Haryana ==
#	Corporation Name	District	Area (km^{2})	Population (2011)	No. of Wards	Year Established	Last Election	Ruling Party	Website
1	Gurugram	Gurugram	232	876,969	36	2008	2025	BJP	
2	Faridabad	Faridabad	207.08	1,400,000	46	1993	2025	BJP	
3	Sonipat	Sonipat	181	596,974	20	1993	2026	BJP	
4	Panchkula	Panchkula	32.06	558,890	20		2026	BJP	
5	Yamunanagar	Yamunanagar	216.62	532,000	22		2025	BJP	
6	Rohtak	Rohtak	139	373,133	22	1993	2025	BJP	
7	Karnal	Karnal	87	310,989	20	1993	2025	BJP	
8	Hisar	Hisar		301,249	20	2016	2025	BJP	
9	Panipat	Panipat	56	294,150	26	2010	2025	BJP	
10	Ambala	Ambala		128,350	20	2016	2026	BJP	
11	Manesar	Gurgaon	124.32	128,350	20	2025	2025	BJP	

== Himachal Pradesh ==
#	Corporation Name	District	Area (km^{2})	Population (2011)	No. of Wards	Year Established	Last Election	Ruling Party	Website
1	Shimla	Shimla	35.34	171,817	34	1851	2023	INC	
2	Dharamshala	Kangra	27.60	58,260	17	2015	2026	BJP	
3	Palampur	Kangra	31.58	40,385	15	2020	2026	INC	
4	Solan	Solan	33.43	47,418	17	1868	2026	BJP	
5	Mandi	Mandi	28.66	41,375	15	2020	2026	BJP	
6	Baddi	Solan	18.54	40,919	15	2024	TBA	TBE	
7	Hamirpur	Hamirpur	40.77	41,752	15	2024	TBA	TBE	
8	Una	Una	40.97	45,606	15	2024	TBA	TBE	

== Jharkhand ==
#	Corporation Name	District	Area (km^{2})	Population (2011)	No. of Wards	Year Established	Last Election	Ruling Party	Website
1	Ranchi	Ranchi	175.12	1,126,741	55	1979	23 February 2026	Non Partisan	
2	Dhanbad	Dhanbad	275.00	1,195,298	55	2006	23 February 2026	Non Partisan	
3	Chas	Bokaro	29.98	563,417	35	2015	23 February 2026	Non Partisan	
4	Deoghar	Deoghar	119.70	283,116	36	2010	23 February 2026	Non Partisan	
5	Adityapur	Seraikela Kharsawan	49.00	225,628	35	2016	23 February 2026	Non Partisan	
6	Mango	East Singhbhum	18.03	224,002	03	2017	23 February 2026	Non Partisan	
7	Hazaribagh	Hazaribagh	53.94	186,139	36	2016	23 February 2026	Non Partisan	
8	Medininagar	Palamu	14.90	158,941	35	2015	23 February 2026	Non Partisan	
9	Giridih	Giridih	87.04	143,529	36	2016	23 February 2026	Non Partisan	

== Karnataka ==
#	Corporation Name	District	Area (km^{2})	Population (2011)	No. of Wards	Year Established	Last Election	Ruling Party	Website
1	Bengaluru West	Bengaluru Urban			111	1949	2026	TBE	
2	Bengaluru South	Bengaluru Urban			72	1949	2026	TBE	
3	Bengaluru Central	Bengaluru Urban			63	1949	2026	TBE	
4	Bengaluru East	Bengaluru Urban			50	1949	2026	TBE	
5	Bengaluru North	Bengaluru Urban			72	1949	2026	TBE	
6	Mysuru	Mysuru	341.44	920,550		1862	2026	TBE	
7	Hubli-Dharwad	Dharwad	120.94	943,857	26	2025	2026	TBE	
8	Mangaluru	Dakshina Kannada	170	724,159	60	1865	2026	TBE	
9	Kalaburagi	Kalaburagi	192	533,587	55	1965	2026	TBE	
10	Belagavi	Belagavi	94.08	490,045	58	1851	2026	TBE	
11	Davanagere	Davanagere	77	435,128	45	2007	2026	TBE	
12	Ballari	Ballari	89.95	409,444	39	2001	2026	TBE	
13	Vijayapura	Vijayapura	102.38	326,360	35	2013	2026	TBE	
14	Shivamogga	Shivamogga	70.01	322,650	35	2013	2026	TBE	
15	Tumakuru	Tumakuru	102.9	305,821	35	2013	2026	TBE	
16	Raichur	Raichur	43.85	234,073	35	2024	2026	TBE	
17	Bidar	Bidar	91.96	201,620'	35	2025	2026	TBE	
18	Hassan	Hassan	86.01	300,000	35	2025	2026	TBE	

== Keralam ==
#	Corporation Name	District	Area (km^{2})	Population (2011)	No. of Wards	Year Established	Last Election	Ruling Party	Website
1	Thiruvananthapuram	Thiruvananthapuram	214.86	957,730	100	1940	9-11 December 2025	BJP	
2	Kozhikode	Kozhikode	118	609,214	75	1962	9-11 December 2025	CPI(M)	
3	Kochi	Ernakulam	94.88	601,574	74	1967	9-11 December 2025	INC	
4	Kollam	Kollam	73.03	388,288	55	2000	9-11 December 2025	INC	
5	Thrissur	Thrissur	101.42	315,596	55	2000	9-11 December 2025	INC	
6	Kannur	Kannur	78.35	232,486	55	2015	9-11 December 2025	INC	

== Madhya Pradesh ==
#	Corporation Name	District	Area (km^{2})	Population (2011)	No. of Wards	Year Established	Last Election	Ruling Party	Website
1	Indore	Indore	530	2,167,447	85		July 2022	BJP	
2	Bhopal	Bhopal	463	1,886,100	85		July 2022	BJP	
3	Jabalpur	Jabalpur	263	1,268,848			July 2022	BJP	
4	Gwalior	Gwalior	289	1,117,740	66		July 2022	INC	
5	Ujjain	Ujjain	152	515,215	54		July 2022	BJP	
6	Sagar	Sagar	50	370,296			July 2022	BJP	
7	Burhanpur	Burhanpur	35	300,892			July 2022	BJP	
8	Dewas	Dewas	50	289,438			July 2022	BJP	
9	Satna	Satna	112	283,004			July 2022	BJP	
10	Ratlam	Ratlam	39	273,892	49		July 2022	BJP	
11	Khandwa	Khandwa		259,436			July 2022	BJP	
12	Chhindwara	Chhindwara	110	234,784	48		July 2022	BJP	
13	Katni	Katni		221,875			July 2022	BJP	
14	Rewa	Rewa	69	235,422	45		July 2022	INC	
15	Morena	Morena	80	218,768			July 2022	BJP	
16	Singrauli	Singrauli		225,676			July 2022	AAP	

== Maharashtra ==
#	Corporation Name	District	Area (km^{2})	Population (2011)	No. of Wards	Year Established	Last Election	Ruling Party	Website
1	Mumbai	Mumbai City & Mumbai Suburban	609	12,442,373		1726	15 January 2026	BJP	
2	Pune	Pune	484.61	6,451,618		1950	15 January 2026	BJP	
3	Nagpur	Nagpur	227.36	3,428,897		1951	15 January 2026	BJP	
4	Nashik	Nashik	267	1,886,973		1982	15 January 2026	BJP	
5	Thane	Thane	147	1,818,872			15 January 2026	SS	
6	Pimpri-Chinchwad	Pune	181	1,729,320			15 January 2026	BJP	
7	Kalyan-Dombivli	Thane	137.15	1,246,381			15 January 2026	SS	
8	Vasai-Virar	Palghar	311	1,221,233			15 January 2026	BVA	
9	Aurangabad	Chhatrapati Sambhajinagar	139	1,171,330			15 January 2026	BJP	
10	Navi Mumbai	Thane	344	1,119,477		1992	15 January 2026	BJP	
11	Solapur	Solapur	180.67	951,118		1963	15 January 2026	BJP	
12	Mira-Bhayandar	Thane	79.04	814,655			15 January 2026	BJP	
13	Bhiwandi-Nizampur	Thane		711,329			15 January 2026	IND	
14	Amravati	Amravati	280	646,801			15 January 2026	BJP	
15	Nanded-Waghala	Nanded		550,564			15 January 2026	BJP	
16	Kolhapur	Kolhapur	66.82	549,236			15 January 2026	BJP	
17	Akola	Akola	128	537,489	91	2001	15 January 2026	BJP	
18	Panvel	Raigad	110.06	509,901			15 January 2026	BJP	
19	Ulhasnagar	Thane	28	506,937			15 January 2026	SS	
20	Sangli-Miraj-Kupwad	Sangli		502,697			15 January 2026	BJP	
21	Malegaon	Nashik	68.56	471,006			15 January 2026	ISLAM	
22	Jalgaon	Jalgaon	68	460,468			15 January 2026	BJP	
23	Latur	Latur	32.56	382,754			15 January 2026	INC	
24	Dhule	Dhule	142	376,093			15 January 2026	BJP	
25	Ahmednagar	Ahmednagar	39.30	350,905			15 January 2026	NCP	
26	Chandrapur	Chandrapur	76	321,036			15 January 2026	BJP	
27	Parbhani	Parbhani	57.61	307,191			15 January 2026	SS(UBT)	
28	Ichalkaranji	Kolhapur	49.84	287,570		2022	15 January 2026	BJP	
29	Jalna	Jalna	81.6	4,50,000 (2025)		2023	15 January 2026	BJP	

== Odisha ==
#	Corporation Name	District	Area (km^{2})	Population (2011)	No. of Wards	Year Established	Last Election	Ruling Party	Website
1	Bhubaneswar	Khordha	186	837,737	67	1994	TBD		
2	Kataka	Cuttack	192.05	650,000	59	1994	TBD		
3	Rourkela	Sundergarh	102	536,450	40	2015	TBD		
4	Berhampur	Ganjam	79	356,598	42	2008	TBD		
5	Sambalpur	Sambalpur	303	335,761	41	2015	TBD		
6	Puri	Puri				2025	TBD		

== Punjab ==
#	Corporation Name	District	Area (km^{2})	Population (2011)	No. of Wards	Year Established	Last Election	Ruling Party	Website
1	Ludhiana	Ludhiana	159.37	1,613,878	95		2024	AAP	
2	Amritsar	Amritsar	139	1,132,761	85	1979	2024	AAP	
3	Jalandhar	Jalandhar	110	862,196	80		2024	AAP	
4	Patiala	Patiala	160	646,800	60	1997	2024	AAP	
5	Phagwara	Kapurthala	20	117,954	50		2024	AAP	
6	Bathinda	Bathinda		285,813	50		2026	AAP	
7	Batala	Gurdaspur	42	211,594	35	2019	2026	AAP	
8	Mohali	Mohali	176.17	174,000	50		2026	AAP	
9	Hoshiarpur	Hoshiarpur		168,731	50		2026	AAP	
10	Moga	Moga		163,897	50	2011	2026	AAP	
11	Pathankot	Pathankot		159,460	50	2011	2026	BJP	
12	Abohar	Fazilka	188.24	145,658	50	2019	2026	BJP	
13	Kapurthala	Kapurthala		101,854	48	2019	2026	AAP	
14	Barnala	Barnala		285,813		2025	2026	AAP	

== Rajasthan ==
#	Corporation Name	District	Area (km^{2})	Population (2011)	No. of Wards	Year Established	Last Election	Ruling Party	Website
1	Jaipur	Jaipur	484.64	3,073,350	150		9-11 September 2026	BJP	
2	Jodhpur	Jodhpur		1,033,756	100		9-11 September 2026	BJP	
3	Kota	Kota		1,001,365	100		9-11 September 2026	BJP	
4	Bikaner	Bikaner	270	647,804	80		9-11 September 2026	INC	
5	Ajmer	Ajmer	55	542,580	80		9-11 September 2026	BJP	
6	Udaipur	Udaipur	64	451,735	80		9-11 September 2026	BJP	
7	Bhilwara	Bhilwara		709,483	70		9-11 September 2026	BJP	
8	Alwar	Alwar	250	461,618	65		9-11 September 2026	BJP	
9	Bharatpur	Bharatpur		252,109	65		9-11 September 2026	BJP	
10	Pali	Pali			65		9-11 September 2026	BJP	

== Tamil Nadu ==
#	Corporation Name	District	Area (km^{2})	Population (2011)	No. of Wards	Year Established	Last Election	Ruling Party	Website
1	Chennai	Chennai	426	7,139,630	200	1688	2022	DMK	
2	Coimbatore	Coimbatore	246.75	1,758,025	100	1981	2022	DMK	
3	Madurai	Madurai	515.67	3,792,068	100	1971	2022	DMK	
4	Tiruchirappalli	Tiruchirappalli	167.23	1,122,717	65	1994	2022	DMK	
5	Tambaram	Chengalpattu	87.56	1,096,591	70	2021	2022	DMK	
6	Tiruppur	Tiruppur	159.06	963,150	60	2008	2022	DMK	
7	Salem	Salem	91.37	932,336	60	1994	2022	DMK	
8	Tirunelveli	Tirunelveli	189.2	868,874	55	1994	2022	DMK	
9	Vellore	Vellore	87.91	687,981	60	2008	2022	DMK	
10	Avadi	Thiruvallur	65	612,446	48	2019	2022	DMK	
11	Erode	Erode	109.52	521,776	60	2008	2022	DMK	
12	Thoothukudi	Thoothukudi	36.66	431,628	60	2008	2022	DMK	
13	Karur	Karur	103.56	358,468	48	2021	2022	DMK	
14	Thanjavur	Thanjavur	128.5	322,236	51	2014	2022	DMK	
15	Kancheepuram	Kanchipuram	127.8	311,598	51	2021	2022	DMK	
16	Dindigul	Dindigul	46.09	268,643	48	2014	2022	DMK	
17	Sivakasi	Virudhunagar	53.67	260,047	48	2021	2022	DMK	
18	Hosur	Krishnagiri	72	245,354	45	2019	2022	DMK	
19	Nagercoil	Kanyakumari	50	236,774	52	2019	2022	DMK	
20	Kumbakonam	Thanjavur	48	223,763	48	2021	2022	DMK	
21	Cuddalore	Cuddalore	27.69	173,639	45	2021	2022	DMK	
22	Karaikudi	Sivaganga	94.31	303,291		2024	2022	DMK	
23	Namakkal	Namakkal				2024			
24	Pudukkottai	Pudukkottai				2024			
25	Tiruvannamalai	Tiruvannamalai				2024			

== Telangana ==
#	Corporation Name	District	Area (km^{2})	Population (2011)	No. of Wards	Year Established	Last Election	Ruling Party	Website
1	Greater Hyderabad	Hyderabad, Medchal–Malkajgiri, Ranga Reddy, Sangareddy	689	7,677,018	150	1869	TBA	TBD	
2	Cyberabad	Hyderabad, Medchal–Malkajgiri, Ranga Reddy, Sangareddy	637		76	2026	TBA	TBD	
3	Malkajgiri	Hyderabad, Medchal–Malkajgiri, Ranga Reddy, Sangareddy	729		74	2026	TBA	TBD	
4	Greater Warangal	Warangal	406	1,020,116	66	1844	TBA	TBD	
5	Khammam	Khammam	93.45	305,000	51	2012	TBA	TBD	
6	Karimnagar	Karimnagar	40.50	261,185	66	1941	2026	BJP	
7	Nizamabad	Nizamabad	42.09	311,467	60	2005	2026	INC	
8	Ramagundam	Peddapalli	93.87	229,644	60	2009	2026	INC	
9	Mahabubnagar	Mahabubnagar	98.64	222,573	60		2026	INC	
10	Mancherial	Mancherial	155.93	87,153	60	2026	2026	INC	
11	Nalgonda	Nalgonda			48		2026	INC	
12	Kothagudem	Bhadradri Kothagudem			60	2025	2026	CPI	

== Uttar Pradesh ==
#	Corporation Name	District	Area (km^{2})	Population (2011)	No. of Wards	Year Established	Last Election	Ruling Party	Website
1	Lucknow	Lucknow	631	2,815,601	110	1884	2023	BJP	
2	Kanpur	Kanpur Nagar	403	2,767,031	110	1959	2023	BJP	
3	Agra	Agra	159	2,470,996	100	2017	2023	BJP	
4	Ghaziabad	Ghaziabad	210	2,458,525	100	1994	2023	BJP	
5	Varanasi	Varanasi	121	1,746,467	100	1982	2023	BJP	
6	Meerut	Meerut	450	1,435,113	90	1994	2023	BJP	
7	Prayagraj	Prayagraj	365	1,424,908	100	1994	2023	BJP	
8	Aligarh	Aligarh	40	1,216,719	90	1959	2023	BJP	
9	Bareilly	Bareilly	106	959,933	80	1994	2023	BJP	
10	Ayodhya	Ayodhya	872.81	909,559	60	2017	2023	BJP	
11	Moradabad	Moradabad	149	889,810		1994	2023	BJP	
12	Saharanpur	Saharanpur		703,345		2009	2023	BJP	
13	Gorakhpur	Gorakhpur	226.0	1,500,000		1994	2023	BJP	
14	Firozabad	Firozabad		603,797	70	2014	2023	BJP	
15	Mathura-Vrindavan	Mathura	28	602,897		2017	2023	BJP	
16	Jhansi	Jhansi	168	592,899	60	2002	2023	BJP	
17	Shahjahanpur	Shahjahanpur	51	346,103		2018	2023	BJP	

== Uttarakhand ==
#	Corporation Name	District	Area (km^{2})	Population (2011)	No. of Wards	Year Established	Last Election	Ruling Party	Website
1	Dehradun	Dehradun	196	578,420	100	2003	2025	BJP	
2	Haldwani	Nainital	44	225,235	60	2011	2025	BJP	
3	Haridwar	Haridwar	105	156,060	60	2011	2025	BJP	
4	Rudrapur	Udham Singh Nagar	27.65	140,884	40	2013	2025	BJP	
5	Kashipur	Udham Singh Nagar	5.04	121,610	40	2013	2025	BJP	
6	Roorkee	Haridwar	10	118,188	40	2013	2025	BJP	
7	Rishikesh	Dehradun	11.05	104,249	40	2017	2025	BJP	
8	Pithoragarh	Pithoragarh		62,500	40	2024	2025	BJP	
9	Almora	Almora		39,600	40	2024	2025	BJP	
10	Kotdwar	Pauri Garhwal	80	28,859	40	2017	2025	BJP	
11	Srinagar	Pauri Garhwal		37,911	40	2021	2025	IND	

== West Bengal ==
#	Corporation Name	District	Area (km^{2})	Population (2011)	No. of Wards	Year Established	Last Election	Ruling Party	Website
1	Kolkata	Kolkata	206.08	4,496,694	209	1876	2026	TBD	
2	Howrah	Howrah	63.55	1,370,448	68	1980	2026	TBD	
3	Durgapur	Paschim Bardhaman	154.20	566,517	43	1994	2027	TBD	
4	Asansol	Paschim Bardhaman	326.48	1,153,138	106	1994	2027	TBD	
5	Bidhannagar	North 24 Parganas	60.05	632,107	41	2015	2027	TBD	
6	Siliguri	Darjeeling and Jalpaiguri	117.45	513,264	47	1994	2027	TBD	
7	Chandannagar	Hooghly	22.00	166,761	33	1994	2027	TBD	

== North-east India ==
#	Corporation Name	State	District	Area (km^{2})	Population (2011)	No. of Wards	Year Established	Last Election	Ruling Party	Website
1	Itanagar	Arunachal Pradesh	Papum Pare			30	2013	2025	BJP	
2	Guwahati	Assam	Kamrup Metropolitan	216	1,260,419	60	1971	2022	BJP	
3	Silchar	Assam	Cachar	69.7	650,000	42	2024	2026	BJP	
4	Dibrugarh	Assam	Dibrugarh	15.5	258,000	22	2024		BJP	
5	Imphal	Manipur	Imphal East & Imphal West	268.24	250,234	27	2014	2016	Vacant	
6	Aizawl	Mizoram	Aizawl	129.91	293,416	19	2010	2026	ZPM	
7	Gangtok	Sikkim	East Sikkim	19.02	98,658	19	2010	2026	SKM	
8	Agartala	Tripura	West Tripura	76.51	450,000	51	1871	2021	BJP	
9	N/A	Meghalaya	N/A							
10	N/A	Nagaland	N/A							

== Union Territories ==
#	Corporation Name	UT	District	Area (km^{2})	Population (2011)	No. of Wards	Year Established	Last Election	Ruling Party	Website
1	Chandigarh	Chandigarh	NA	114	960,787	35	1994	2021	BJP	
2	Delhi	Delhi	NA	1397.3		250	1958	2022	BJP	
3	Srinagar	Jammu and Kashmir	Srinagar	227.34	1,273,310	74	2003	2026	TBE	
4	Jammu	Jammu and Kashmir	Jammu	240	951,373	75	2003	2026	TBE	
5	N/A	Andaman and Nicobar Islands	N/A							
6	N/A	Dadra and Nagar Haveli and Daman and Diu	N/A							
7	N/A	Puducherry	N/A							
8	N/A	Ladakh	N/A							
9	N/A	Lakshadweep	N/A							

== Rulling party wise list ==
State	MCs	Vacant	IND	BJP	INC	DMK	AAP	TDP	AITC	BJD	SHS	JSP	CPI(M)	CPI	YSRCP	ZPM	NCP	SS(UBT)	BVA	ISLAM	SKM
State	279	45	31	120	19	22	13	10	2	3	3	2	1	1	1	1	1	1	1	1	1
Andhra Pradesh	17	4						10				2			1						
Arunachal Pradesh	1			1																	
Assam	3			3																	
Bihar	19		19																		
Chandigarh	1			1																	
Chhattisgarh	14			10	4																
Delhi	1			1																	
Goa	1		1																		
Gujarat	17			17																	
Haryana	11			11																	
Himachal Pradesh	8	3		3	2																
Jammu and Kashmir	2	2																			
Jharkhand	9		9																		
Karnataka	18	18																			
Kerala	6			1	4								1								
Madhya Pradesh	16			13	2		1														
Maharashtra	29		1	20	1						3						1	1	1	1	
Manipur	1	1																			
Mizoram	1															1					
Odisha	6	3								3											
Punjab	14	1		1			12														
Rajasthan	10			9	1																
Sikkim	1																				1
Tamil Nadu	25	3				22															
Telangana	12	5		1	5									1							
Tripura	1			1																	
Uttar Pradesh	17			17																	
Uttarakhand	11		1	10																	
West Bengal	7	5							2												
