= 2022 Madhya Pradesh municipal elections =

Election to local civic body

2022 Madhya Pradesh local elections were held in July. The elections to 347 municipalities in Madhya Pradesh were held in two phases. On 6 July, polling was held for the 133 local bodies, while the polling in 214 local bodies was held on 13 July. In the second phase on 13 July, polling was held in five municipal corporations, 40 municipal councils and 168 nagar parishads.

== Results ==
=== Phase 1 ===
The results for the 133 local bodies were announced on 18 July 2022 during the first phase of counting. The 133 local bodies included 11 municipal corporations, 36 municipal councils and 86 town councils. The second phase of counting will be held on July 20.

Mayors for 11 municipal corporations were directly elected. The chairperson of the municipal councils will be elected by councilors indirectly. Of the 11 municipal corporations, the Bharatiya Janata Party (BJP) won seven mayor's seat, Congress won three and Aam Aadmi Party (AAP) won one.

AAP debuted in Madhya Pradesh by winning the election for the Mayor of Singrauli Municipal Corporation and five wards.

=== Phase 2 ===
In the second phase on 13 July, polling was held in five municipal corporations, 40 municipal councils and 168 nagar parishads. The results were declared on 20 July.

=== Municipal corporations ===
Date	Municipal Corporation	Government before	Government after
6 July 2022	Indore Municipal Corporation	Bharatiya Janata Party	Bharatiya Janata Party
6 July 2022	Bhopal Municipal Corporation	Bharatiya Janata Party	Bharatiya Janata Party
6 July 2022	Ujjain Municipal Corporation	Bharatiya Janata Party	Bharatiya Janata Party
6 July 2022	Burhanpur Municipal Corporation	Bharatiya Janata Party	Bharatiya Janata Party
6 July 2022	Khandwa Municipal Corporation	Bharatiya Janata Party	Bharatiya Janata Party
6 July 2022	Sagar Municipal Corporation	Bharatiya Janata Party	Bharatiya Janata Party
6 July 2022	Satna Municipal Corporation	Bharatiya Janata Party	Bharatiya Janata Party
6 July 2022	Singrauli Municipal Corporation	Bharatiya Janata Party	Aam Aadmi Party
6 July 2022	Gwalior Municipal Corporation	Bharatiya Janata Party	Indian National Congress
6 July 2022	Jabalpur Municipal Corporation	Bharatiya Janata Party	Indian National Congress
6 July 2022	Chhindwara Municipal Corporation	Bharatiya Janata Party	Indian National Congress
13 July 2022	Rewa Municipal Corporation	Bharatiya Janata Party	Indian National Congress
13 July 2022	Morena Municipal Corporation	Bharatiya Janata Party	Indian National Congress
13 July 2022	Dewas Municipal Corporation	Bharatiya Janata Party	Bharatiya Janata Party
13 July 2022	Ratlam Municipal Corporation	Bharatiya Janata Party	Bharatiya Janata Party
13 July 2022	Katni Municipal Corporation	Bharatiya Janata Party	Independent politician
