= Gurgaon Municipal Corporation =

Local civic body in Gurugram, Haryana, India

Type
- Type: Municipal Corporation
- Term limits: 5 years

History
- Founded: 2008; 18 years ago

Leadership
- Mayor: Rajrani Malhotra, BJP
- Municipal Commissioner: Narhari Singh Bangar, IAS since October 2024

Structure
- Seats: 36
- Political groups: Government (31): BJP (31); Opposition (5): INC (1); JJP (1); IND (3)
- Length of term: 5 years

Elections
- Voting system: First-past-the-post
- Last election: 2 March 2025
- Next election: 2030

Meeting place
- Gurugram, Haryana

Website
- www.mcg.gov.in

Gurgaon Municipal Corporation is the civic body governing the Indian city of Gurgaon. The Municipal Corporation mechanism in India was introduced during British Rule with the formation of the Municipal Corporation in Madras (Chennai) in 1688, later followed by municipal corporations in Bombay (Mumbai) and Calcutta (Kolkata) by 1762. Gurgaon Municipal Corporation is headed by the Mayor of the city and governed by the Commissioner. The Municipal Corporation of Gurugram has an area of 232 sq km.

== History and administration ==
The Municipal Corporation of Gurugram was formed in the year 2008. The Corporation is headed by mayor Madhu Azad and governed by Municipal Commissioner Mukesh Kumar Ahuja. Gurgaon Municipal Corporation has 35 wards and each ward is headed by the councillor for which elections are held every 5 years. In the Gurgaon Municipal Corporation elections held in the year 2025, BJP won 24 seats, independent candidates won 10 seats, congress and the JJP managed one seat.

The Municipal Corporation of Gurugram has four zones in a total area of 232 Sq km.

== Powers and functions ==
The Municipal Corporation of Gurugram has the following departments for the summarised functions-

- Accounts and Pension - The Senior Accounts Officer heads the department which handles the preparation of budgets for the city, maintaining corporation account books, accounting of expenditure bills, and pension cases of its employees.
- Administration - The Joint Commissioner heads the department which handles regulating and monitoring that principles of the corporation are followed, handling corporation employees' cases, managing RTI applications, handling the procurement issues of corporations, and implementing laws made by corporations and other internal issues.
- Engineering - The Superintendent Engineer or Executive Engineer heads the department which handles accounting for financial resources from the Government of India, the Government of Haryana, and other organisations for improving infrastructure and infrastructure-related works in the city.
- Fire - Handling issues relating to fire and ensuring that the City's structures follow Fire safety measures.
- Audit - The department lays down various guidelines and controls while incurring expenditures for the corporation.
- Health and Sanitation - The Chief Sanitation Officer heads the department which handles issues relating to cleaning of streets, garbage disposal, solid waste management, and other sanitation issues.
- Information Technology - The Manager of Information Technology heads the department which handles the primary functions of maintaining and operating the corporation website and providing Information Technology-related training to corporation employees along with maintenance of various data in digital mode.
- Tax - The Tax Officer heads the department which handles functions relating to imposition and collection of vehicle tax, property tax, development tax, house tax, and fire tax.
- Land and License - The Land Officer heads the department which handles the main purpose of regularizing activities relating to advertising, granting licenses relating to the installation of mobile phone towers in the city, events relating to the sale and purchase of land, and collection of rent from various sources among others.
- Town Planning and Building - The Chief Town Planner heads the department which handles issues relating to town and urban planning, monitoring the land use and construction, issuing Government approvals for purposes like commercial, industrial, residential, and any others, and regularising unauthorized settlements, which are major functions with the department.
- Legal - The District Attorney heads the department which majorly deals with legal issues relating to the corporation.

== See also ==
- List of municipal corporations in India
