= Nagar panchayat =

Form of urban political unit in India

A nagar panchayat (transl. 'town council'; also town panchayat or a Notified Area Council, NAC) in India is a settlement in transition from rural to urban and therefore a form of an urban political unit comparable to a municipality. An urban centre with more than 12,000 and less than 40,000 inhabitants is classified as a nagar panchayat. The population requirement for a town panchayat can vary from state to state.

Such councils are formed under the panchayati raj administrative system. In census data, the abbreviation T.P. is used to indicate a "town panchayat". Tamil Nadu was the first state to introduce the panchayat town as an intermediate step between rural villages and urban local bodies (ULBs). The structure and the functions of the nagar panchayat are decided by the state government.

== Governance ==
Under Article 243Q of the Constitution of India, states must set up a nagar panchayat for areas changing from rural to urban. The Governor of the state officially declares these areas based on local details like population size, density and the level of non-agricultural employment.

Each nagar panchayat has a committee consisting of a chairperson or president with ward members. Membership consists of a minimum of ten elected ward members and three nominated members. The chairperson or president is the head of the nagar panchayat. The NAC members of the Nagar are elected from the several wards of the nagar panchayat on the basis of adult franchise for a term of five years. One third of the seats are reserved for scheduled castes, scheduled tribes, backward classes and women. The councillors or ward members are chosen by direct election from electoral wards in the nagar panchayat.

Alongside the elected officials, the state government appoints officers to facilitate the administration and functioning of nagar panchayats, such as chief executive officers, secretaries, superintendents, engineers, and health inspectors. These officers are appointed based on specific rules and regulations set by the state government. The structure and the functions of the nagar panchayat are decided by the state government.

Each Indian state has its own management directorate for panchayat towns.

- Karnataka:
- Kerala: Local Self Government Department
- Maharashtra
- Tamil Nadu: Directorate of Town Panchayats

== Revenue sources ==
- Property tax
- Professional tax
- License fees, rents and other charges such as water charges
- Surcharge on stamp duty
- Devolution grants from the government
- Other miscellaneous incomes such as interest on deposits
- Own incomes from municipal assets (such as incomes from municipal town hall, municipal market)

== See also ==
- List of municipal corporations in India
