= Suman Bala =

Suman Bala may refer to:

- Suman Bala (field hockey)
- Suman Bala (politician)
