= Maroofganj (Gaya) =

Marufganj मारूफगंज (Hindi) معروف گنج (Urdu)
- Neighbourhood
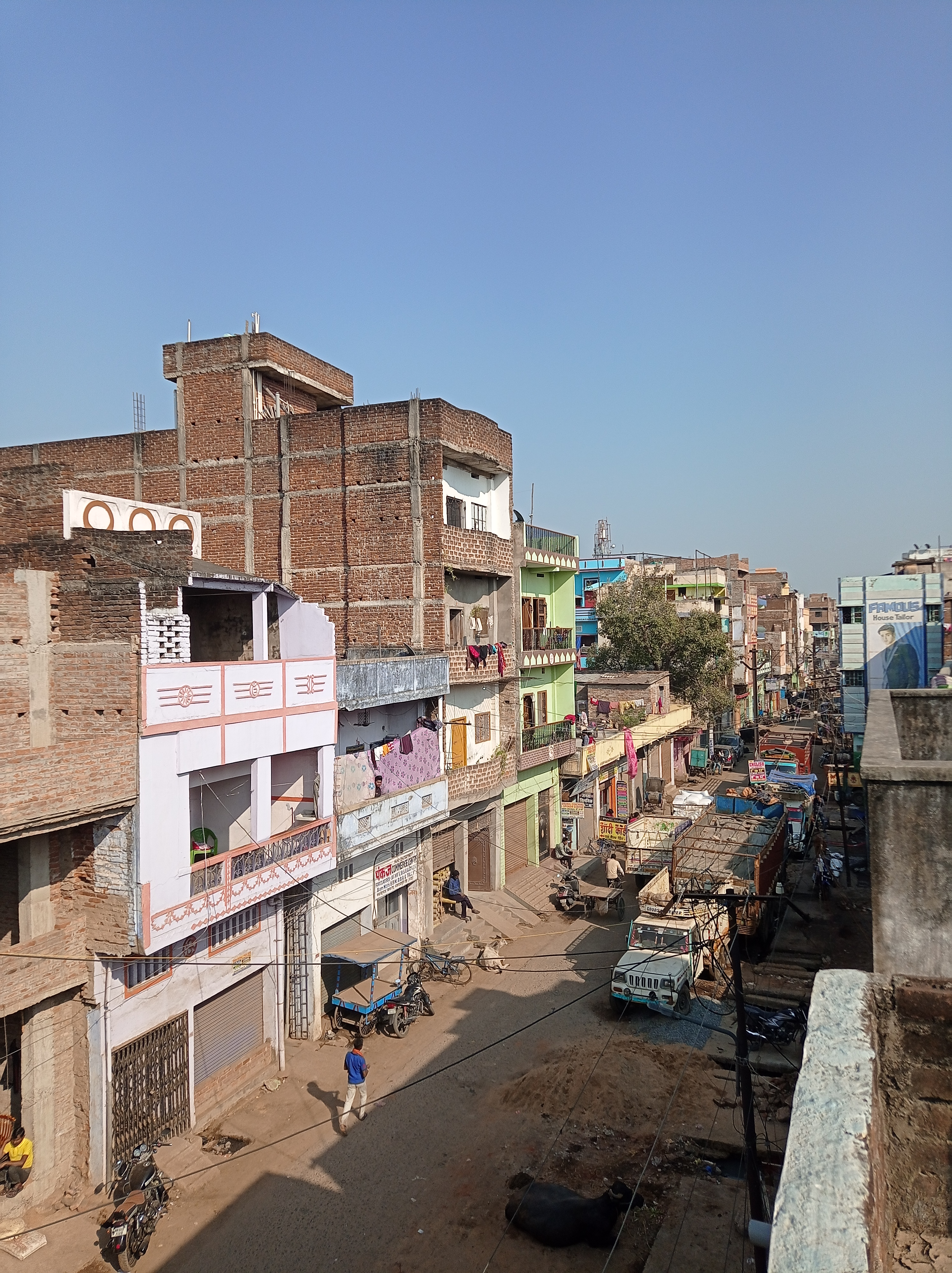
- Nala Road in Maroofganj, January 2022

- Location within Bihar Location within India
- Coordinates: 24°47′54″N 85°00′04″E
- Country: India
- State: Bihar
- City: Gaya

Government
  - Body: Gaya Nagar Nigam

Language
  - Official: Hindi, Urdu
  - Spoken: Magadhi, Hindi, Urdu
- Time zone: UTC+5:30
- PIN: 823001

Maroofganj (Hindi: मारूफगंज, IAST: mārūphagaṃja; Urdu: معروف گنج, romanized: maʿrūfganj), also spelled Marufganj, is a residential neighborhood under the jurisdiction of the Kotwali thana of Gaya, Bihar, India. In close proximity to the Gaya Junction railway station, it is one of the oldest and among the most crime-infested localities in the town. The area is known for landmarks such as Urdu Girls High School and Nala Road.

== Etymology ==
Maroofganj derives its name from the Arabic word al-maʿrūf (Arabic: مَعْرُوف, lit. acknowledged or right) and Middle Persian word ganj (Persian: گنج, lit. treasured place or neighborhood).

== Water pollution ==
Besides its high crime rate, Maroofganj is also unpopular in Gaya for its poor sewerage infrastructure where residents see occasional and regular overflows especially in the area surrounding Nala Road (Hindi: नाला रोड, lit. 'drainage road').
