= Gaya Municipal Corporation =

Civic body responsible for the administration of Gaya

- Logo of Gaya Municipal Corporation featuring Rajendra Tower

Type
- Type: Municipal corporation

History
- Founded: 1983; 43 years ago

Leadership
- Mayor: Birendra Kumar
- Deputy Mayor: Chinta Devi
- Municipal Commissioner: Dr. Gagan
- Seats: 53

Elections
- Last election: 2022

Meeting place
- Durga Bari, Gaya, Bihar - 823001

Website
- Official website

Gaya Municipal Corporation (GMC), better known by its Hindi name Gaya Nagar Nigam, is the civic body governing the city of Gaya in the Indian state of Bihar. It was established in 1983 during the tenure of Chief Minister Chandrashekhar Singh and is responsible for upkeep of facilities and overseeing the city's 53 electoral subdivisions, known as wards.

Municipal Corporation mechanism in India was introduced during British Rule with formation of municipal corporation in Madras (Chennai) in 1688, later followed by municipal corporations in Bombay (Mumbai) and Calcutta (Kolkata) by 1762.

== History and administration ==
Gaya Municipal Corporation was established in accordance with the Gaya Municipal Corporation Act vide S.O. No. 1390 dated 18 November 1983 to improve the infrastructure of the town as per the needs of local population. Gaya Municipal Corporation has been categorised into wards and each ward is headed by a councillor for which elections are held every 5 years.

Gaya Municipal Corporation Municipal Corporation is governed by mayor Birendra Kumar and administered by Municipal Commissioner Kumar Anurag who is an IAS officer of 2019 batch belonging to Bihar Cadre.

== Functions ==
Gaya Municipal Corporation is created for the following functions:

- Planning for the town including its surroundings which are covered under its Department's Urban Planning Authority .
- Approving construction of new buildings and authorising use of land for various purposes.
- Improvement of the town's economic and Social status.
- Arrangements of water supply towards commercial, residential and industrial purposes.
- Planning for fire contingencies through Fire Service Departments.
- Creation of solid waste management, public health system and sanitary services.
- Working for the development of ecological aspect like development of Urban Forestry and making guidelines for environmental protection.
- Working for the development of weaker sections of the society like mentally and physically handicapped, old age and gender biased people.
- Making efforts for improvement of slums and poverty removal in the town.

== Revenue sources ==
The following are the Income sources for the Corporation from the Central and State Government.

=== Revenue from taxes ===
Following is the Tax related revenue for the corporation.

- Property tax.
- Profession tax.
- Entertainment tax.
- Grants from Central and State Government like Goods and Services Tax.
- Advertisement tax.

=== Revenue from non-tax sources ===
Following is the Non Tax related revenue for the corporation.

- Water usage charges.
- Fees from Documentation services.
- Rent received from municipal property.
- Funds from municipal bonds.

== See also ==
- List of municipal corporations in India
