= Smart City Bhopal =

- Country: India
- Key people: Narendra Modi
- Launched: 2015
- Funding: ₹700 crore (US$80 million)
- Status: active

Smart City Bhopal is an initiative by the Bhopal Municipal Corporation (BMC) to "transform Bhopal into a leading destination for Smart, Connected and Eco Friendly communities focused on Education, Research, Entrepreneurship and Tourism." Bhopal is on a list of 98 smart cities declared by the Government of India for development under the Smart Cities Mission.

== History ==
The "100 Smart Cities Mission" was launched by Prime Minister Narendra Modi on 25 June 2015. The finance minister of Madhya Pradesh, Jayant Malaiya, allocated ₹700 crore (US$80 million) for this project.

== Development ==
Area based development at the 354 acres (143 ha) site at North TT Nagar is under construction The total investment in 450 kilometres (280 mi) of fiber optic cable being laid under Intelligent street lighting is expected to be ₹500 crore (US$57 million). The Public–private partnership (PPP) mode project is expected to earn BMC around ₹900 crore (US$103 million) in next decade.

=== Technology ===
HP's Universal Internet of Things (UIoT) Platform will be used to create India's first cloud-based Integrated Command and Control Centre (ICCC) in Bhopal. The center will enable the complete monitoring and administration of civic utilities and citizen services of Bhopal.

=== Incubation Centre ===
B-Nest Bhopal Smart City incubation centre is developed to facilitate start-up. Tie-up with American tech company Esri has been made to provide free access to Esri's cloud-based mapping platform, software development tools for Startups.
