= Ircon International =

Indian railway infrastructure company

Indian Railway Construction International ltd
- Formerly: Indian Railway Construction Limited
- Type: Public
- Traded as: BSE: 541956; NSE: IRCON
- Industry: Railway infrastructure
- Founded: 27 April 1976; 50 years ago
- Headquarters: C-4 District Centre, Saket, New Delhi, India
- Areas served: Worldwide
- Key people: Shri Hari Mohan Gupta (Chairman & MD); Suman Bala (Independent Director)
- Services: Engineering, procurement and construction
- Revenue: ▲₹5,441.72 crore (US$570 million) (2020)
- Operating income: ▲₹699.70 crore (US$73 million) (2020)
- Net income: ▲₹489.78 crore (US$51 million) (2020)
- Total assets: ▲₹12,644.11 crore (US$1.3 billion) (2020)
- Total equity: ▲₹4,161.13 crore (US$430 million) (2020)
- Owner: Government of India
- Number of employees: 1260 (14 May 2024)
- Subsidiaries: Ircon Infrastructure & Services Limited; Ircon Shivpuri-Guna Tollway Limited; Ircon PB Tollway Limited
- Website: www.ircon.org

Ircon International, or Indian Railway Construction International Limited (IRCON), is an Indian engineering & construction corporation, specialized in transport infrastructure. The public sector undertaking was established in 1976, by the Indian Railways under the Indian Companies Act 1956. IRCON was registered as the Indian Railway Construction International Limited, a wholly owned entity of the Indian Railway Board. Its primary charter was the construction of railway projects in India and abroad. Ircon has since diversified into other transport and infrastructure segments and with its expanded scope of operations around the world, the name was changed to Indian Railway International Ltd. in October 1995.

The Ircon is known for undertaking challenging infrastructure projects, especially in difficult terrains in India and abroad. Ircon has completed over 1650 major infrastructure projects in India and over 900 major projects across the globe in more than 31 countries.
The Ministry of Finance conferred ‘Navratna’ status on Ircon International in year 2023.

IRCON International shares listed on the NSE and BSE touched an all-time high of around Rs 325 in the year 2024. In August 2026, former Mayor of Faridabad Suman Bala was appointed as an Independent (Part-Time Non-Official) Director on the Board of Directors for a three-year tenure.

== Area of business ==
The core competence of the company in order of priority are - Railways, Highways and EHT Substation Engineering and Construction. Ircon is a turnkey construction company that is specialized in railways (new railway lines, rehabilitation/conversion of existing lines, station buildings and facilities, bridges, tunnels, signalling and telecommunication, railway electrification, and wet leasing of locomotives), highways, EHV sub-station (engineering, procurement and construction) and metro rail.

== Major projects ==
=== Afghanistan-Iran ===
- Chabahar-Zahedan Railway: In May 2016, during Indian Prime Minister Narendra Modi's trip to Iran, agreement was signed to develop two berths at Port of Chabahar and to build new Chabahar-Zahedan railway from Chabahar Port in Iran to Afghanistan, as part of North–South Transport Corridor, by Indian Railways' public sector unit Ircon International. The establishment of the port of Chabahar's connection to the country's railway plan, is under study and consideration. With the completion of the Kerman–Zahedan railway and its connection to the port of Chabahar, this port will connect to the Trans-Iranian Railway. However, in July 2020 Iran dropped India from the project, citing delays from the Indian side in funding and starting the project.

=== Malaysia ===
- Project includes design, construction, completion, testing, commissioning and maintenance of the double track project between Seremban and Gemas, Malaysia. Ircon is helping Malaysia revive a multibillion-dollar rail project that had been shelved in 2003 due to its high cost, Malaysia's transport minister said Saturday, according to a report. - 21 April 2007 - India's Ircon to take part in multibillion-dollar railway project in Malaysia. After winning this project worth US$1 Billion in Malaysia for doubling of the track the company was awarded the rehabilitation of Railway line projects of about 250 million US$ in Sri Lanka.

=== Jammu and Kashmir, India ===
- The project deals with design and construction of New BG Rail link with 11.5 km long tunnel from Banihal – Baramulla in Kashmir valley to Jammu region inclusive of planning, design and construction of all the services and residential buildings, circulating area, parking, platforms, subways, shelters and other allied structures of all stations involved the construction of Rail link between Banihal and Baramulla (Total Length 136 km). Also completed construction of the longest Rail Tunnel of INDIA from Banihal to Qazigund (Namely Pir Panjal Tunnel).The project was turn key construction involving the following areas:
- Survey & Design
- Infrastructure Works (Earthwork, Bridges)
- Track Work
- Signaling Works
- Electrical Works
- Tunnel Construction Work

The project is unique and challenging in the aspect that it passes through the difficult terrain, inaccessible areas and working in the region severely affected by militancy. The project posed the challenge by involving high bridges, viaducts and tunnels. Ircon was assigned the work by Ministry of Railways on the ground of its capability of executing the work in challenging and difficult areas. Ircon completed above project despite adverse climate and conditions. At a time of heavy snowfall and rainfall when there was no work going on in the valley Ircon engineers and staff were on the job completing the work in a tight time frame. World Famous Tunnel T48 & Sumber station is located in this project.

IRCON is also involved in construction of 42.5 km of Katra-Banihal stretch with track passing through India's most challenging geological terrain. Landslide, flashfloods, debris fallout, cavities, high mass failure is common in the region. Works include:- (I) Construction of Tunnel T14/15. (II) Tunnel T48 (10.2 km) - India's 3rd longest railway tunnel. (III) Tunnel T49 (12 km) - India's longest railway tunnel. (IV) Sumber station yard.

BLT (Ballast less works) in the new system arrangement being used in this stretch

=== Bihar, India ===
The scope of the project is the construction of Digha–Sonpur rail–road bridge, a steel superstructure and other ancillary works of rail cum road bridge across river Ganges at Patna. It is one of its own kind because of huge steel structured bridge amounting to over INR 1200 Crores. Digha–Sonpur rail–road bridge is the largest steel girder bridge and is completed at the cost of ₹1,570 crore (US$160 million). It has been operational since February 2016.

== Milestones achieved ==
- Total length of track laid = 2025.62 km
- Total length of track (Ongoing Projects) = 1174 km

== Countries of operation ==
- Afghanistan
- Algeria
- Bangladesh
- Bhutan
- Ethiopia
- India
- Indonesia
- Iran
- Iraq
- Malaysia
- Mozambique
- Nepal
- South Africa
- Sri Lanka
- Turkey
- London
- Singapore
- Australia

== Customers ==
- Delhi Metro Rail Corporation
- Government of India
- Indian Railways
- Malaysia Railway
- Ministry of Road Transport and Highways
- Mozambique Ports and Railways
- National Highways Authority of India
- Rail Vikas Nigam Limited
- UPPCL
- JKPDD
- Kochi Metro Rail

== Subsidiaries ==
=== Ircon Infrastructure & Services Limited ===
Ircon Infrastructure & Services Limited (IISL, a wholly owned subsidiary of Ircon International Limited) was incorporated under the Companies Act, 1956 on 30 September 2009. The company has obtained a Certificate of Commencement of Business on 10 November 2009 from the office of Registrar of Companies.

The main objects of the company as enshrined in its Memorandum and Articles of Association are to undertake infrastructure projects; to carry on any infrastructure construction work on Build-Operate-Transfer (BOT), Build-Own-Operate-Transfer (BOOT), Build-Lease-Transfer (BLT), etc. or otherwise or any other scheme or project found suitable in and related to the field of infrastructure projects and other ancillary fields; planning, designing, development, improvement, commissioning, operation, maintenance, etc. in the field of construction of infrastructure of Multi Functional Complexes (MFCs), etc. to provide facilities and amenities to users of Indian Railway System. News:; and all matters in the field of real estate and allied areas to make use of the opportunities that may arise. This includes providing project management, quality management, safety, health and environment related consultancy services to clients. Following are its main clients:

- Ministry of External Affairs (India)
- Ministry of Railways (India)

=== Ircon PB Tollway Limited ===
Ircon PB Tollway Limited (IPBTL, a wholly owned subsidiary of Ircon International Limited) was incorporated under the Companies Act, 2013 in September 2014. The company has obtained a Certificate of Commencement of Business in October 2014 from the office of Registrar of Companies.

The main objects of the company as enshrined in its Memorandum and Articles of Association are to undertake Build-Operate-Transfer (BOT), is to construct a road infrastructure between Phulodi and Bikaner in the state of Rajasthan in India for National Highway Authority of India.

=== Ircon Shivpuri Guna Tollway Limited ===
Ircon Shivpuri Guna Tollway Limited (ISGTL, a wholly owned subsidiary of Ircon International Limited) was incorporated under the Companies Act, 2013 in May 2015.

The main objects of the company as enshrined in its Memorandum and Articles of Association are to undertake Build-Operate-Transfer (BOT), is to construct a road infrastructure between Shivpuri and Guna in the state of Madhya Pradesh in India for National Highway Authority of India.

== Related news ==
- Divestment: the Railway Ministry has sought the views of its public sector units, Ircon International and Rail India Technical and Economic Services (RITES), on a possible offload of Government stake in them. Both the profit-making firms are wholly owned by Indian Railways. The Railways could be considering this move to raise funds for the proposed dedicated freight corridor project News Report, 20 June 2011
- Net profits: 3.39% rise in the December 2010 quarter New Report, 3 February 2011

== See also ==
- RITES
- IRCTC
- IRFC
- Ministry of Railways
