= 2025 Hisar Municipal Corporation election =

Election to Hisar Municipal Corporation in 2025

- 12 March 2025

All 20 seats in the Hisar Municipal Corporation 11 seats needed for a majority

	First party	Second party	Third party
Leader	Praveen Popli	Krishna Titu Singla	None
Party	BJP	INC	Independent
Last election	14	4	2
Seats won	17	1	2
Seat change	▲3	▼3	Steady
Popular vote	96,329	31,873	N/A
Mayor before election
Gautam Sardana
BJP
Elected mayor
Praveen Popli
BJP

The 2025 Hisar Municipal Corporation election was held on 12 March 2025 to elect representatives for the 20 wards of the Hisar Municipal Corporation in Haryana, India. The Bharatiya Janata Party (BJP) won a landslide victory, securing 17 of the 20 wards, while the Indian National Congress won 1 ward and Independents won 2 wards. In the mayoral election, BJP candidate Praveen Popli won by a margin of more than 64,000 votes.

== Background ==
The election was seen as a key test of urban support for the BJP in Haryana following the 2024 Haryana Legislative Assembly elections. Hisar has 20 wards, each electing one corporator. The previous 2020 election had BJP winning 14 seats, Congress 4, and Independents 2.

== Party-wise Results ==
Party-wise results – 2025 Hisar Municipal Corporation
Party	Seats Won	Seat Share (%)
Bharatiya Janata Party	17	85%
Indian National Congress	1	5%
Independents	2	10%
Total	20	100%

== Ward-wise Results ==
2025 Hisar Municipal Corporation – Ward-wise Results
Ward	Winning Candidate	Party
1	Saroj Jain	Bharatiya Janata Party
2	Mohit Singhal	Bharatiya Janata Party
3	Jyoti Verma	Bharatiya Janata Party
4	Hari Singh Saini Sankhla	Bharatiya Janata Party
5	Bhim Mahajan	Bharatiya Janata Party
6	Usha	Independent
7	Manohar Lal Verma	Bharatiya Janata Party
8	Ravi Saini	Independent
9	Sheela Devi	Bharatiya Janata Party
10	Sakshi Bijad Sharma	Bharatiya Janata Party
11	Naresh Grewal	Bharatiya Janata Party
12	Jagmohan Mittal	Bharatiya Janata Party
13	Sanjay Dalmia	Bharatiya Janata Party
14	Suman Yadav	Bharatiya Janata Party
15	Santosh Saini	Bharatiya Janata Party
16	Rajender Bidlan	Bharatiya Janata Party
17	Rajesh Arora	Bharatiya Janata Party
18	Gulab Singh	Bharatiya Janata Party
19	Satyawan Pannu	Indian National Congress
20	Naveen Kumar Chhotu	Bharatiya Janata Party

== Voter Turnout ==
Reports indicated moderate voter turnout across the 20 wards, with higher participation in urban centers.

== See also ==
- 2025 Haryana local elections
