= Jammu Municipal Corporation =

Civic body governing Indian city of Jammu

Type
- Type: Municipal Corporation

History
- Founded: 2003; 23 years ago

Leadership
- Mayor: Rajinder Sharma (BJP)
- Deputy Mayor: Baldev Singh Billoria (BJP)
- Municipal Commissioner: Rahul Yadav

Structure
- Seats: 75
- Political groups: Government (43): BJP (43); Opposition (14): INC (14); Others (18): IND (18)

Elections
- Voting system: First past the post
- Last election: 2018
- Next election: no date confirmed

Meeting place
- Jammu, Jammu and Kashmir

Website
- jmcjammu.org

Jammu Municipal Corporation is the civic body governing the city of Jammu. Jammu Municipal Corporation is headed by the city's Mayor and governed by the Commissioner.

== History and administration ==
Jammu Municipal Corporation was formed to improve the infrastructure of the town based on the needs of the local population. Jammu Corporation has been categorized into wards; each ward is headed by a councilor, for which elections are held every five years.

Jammu Municipal Corporation is governed by Mayor Chander Mohan Gupta and administered by Municipal Commissioner Rahul Yadav.

== Functions ==
Jammu Municipal Corporation was created for the following functions:

- Planning for the town including its surroundings which are covered under its Department's Urban Planning Authority.
- Approving construction of new buildings and authorizing use of land for various purposes.
- Improvement of the town's economic and Social status.
- Arrangements of water supply for commercial, residential, and industrial purposes.
- Planning for fire contingencies through Fire Service Departments.
- Creation of solid waste management, public health system, and sanitary services.
- Working for the development of ecological aspects like the development of Urban Forestry and making guidelines for environmental protection.
- Working for the development of weaker sections of society like mentally and physically handicapped, old age, and gender-biased people.
- Making efforts for improvement of slums and poverty removal in the town.

== Revenue sources ==
The following are the Income sources for the Corporation from the Central and State Government.

=== Revenue from taxes ===
Following is the Tax related revenue for the corporation.

- Property tax.
- Profession tax.
- Entertainment tax.
- Grants from Central and State Government like Goods and Services Tax.
- Advertisement tax.

=== Revenue from non-tax sources ===
Following is the Non-Tax related revenue for the corporation.

- Water usage charges.
- Fees from Documentation services.
- Rent received from municipal property.
- Funds from municipal bonds.

== Members ==
Jammu Municipal Corporation has a total of 75 members or corporators, who are directly elected after a term of 5 years. The council is led by the Mayor. The latest elections were held 2018. Rajinder Sharma of the Bharatiya Janata Party is the current mayor of the city of Jammu.

Mayor: Rajinder Sharma
Deputy Mayor: Baldev Singh Billoria
Ward No	Ward Name	Name of Corporator	Party
1	Panjtirthi	Purnima Sharma	BJP
2	Jhullaka Mohalla	Jagdish Kumar	IND
3	Mastgarh	Narottam Sharma	BJP
4	Bhabrian	Sunita Koul	BJP
5	Talab Khatikan	Gopal Gupta	BJP
6	Gujjar Nagar	Mohiuddin	INC
7	Kanji House	Ritu Choudhary	INC
8	Dogra Hall	Akshay Kumar	BJP
9	Mohalla Ustad Old	Suneet Kumar	BJP
10	Pacca Danga	Anil Kumar	BJP
11	Mohalla Malhotrian	Anita Sharma	IND
12	Krishna Nagar	Jeet Kumar	BJP
13	Resham Ghar Colony	Rama	INC
14	Bhagwati Nagar	Parmod Kapahi	BJP
15	Partapgarh	Manish Singh	IND
16	New Plot	Rajinder Sharma	BJP
17	Ambphalla	Nidhi Mangotra	BJP
18	Sarwal	Dinesh Gupta	BJP
19	Chand Nagar	Amit Gupta	IND
20	Gandhi Nagar North	Rahul Kumar	BJP
21	Gandhi Nagar South	Bhanu Mahajan	INC
22	Shastri Nagar	Jaideep Sharma	BJP
23	Nai Basti	Pawan Singh	BJP
24	Rehari North	Anu Bali	IND
25	Rehari South	Arun Kumar	BJP
26	Subhash Nagar	Hardeep Singh	BJP
27	Bakshi Nagar	Charanjeet Kour	INC
28	Gurha Bakshi Nagar	Gourav Chopra	INC
29	Rajpura Mangotrian	Surinder Singh	BJP
30	Talab Tillo North	Sonika Sharma	INC
31	Nowabad	Sucha Singh	IND
32	Gole	Sat Paul	BJP
33	Shiv Nagar	Chander Mohan Gupta	BJP
34	Janipur North	Rani Devi	IND
35	Janipur South	Yash Paul Sharma	BJP
36	Janipur Central	Subhash Sharma	IND
37	Janipura West	Sunita Gupta	BJP
38	Paloura	Surinder Sharma	BJP
39	Toph Sherkhania	Rajinder Singh	INC
40	Poonch House	Neelam	BJP
41	Bohri	Sanjay Kumar	BJP
42	Nanak Nagar West	Vijay Choudhary	IND
43	Nanak Nagar East	Surjeet Singh	BJP
44	Nanak Nagar North	Inder Singh Soodan	IND
45	Digiana	Raj Rani	BJP
46	Sanjay Nagar	Dewarka Nath	INC
47	Bahu East	Sharda Kumari	BJP
48	Bahu West	Sham Lal	IND
49	Channi Rama/Narwal Bala	Kamal Singh Jamwal	INC
50	Channi Himmat Housing Colony	Neena Gupta	BJP
51	Channi Himmat Thangar	Raj Kumar	IND
52	Channi Himmat Biza	Ajay Gupta	BJP
53	Channi Biza Trikuta Nagar	Jyoti Devi	BJP
54	Channi Himmat/Channi Rama/Trikuta Nagar	Neeraj Puri	BJP
55	Deeli	Pritam Singh	INC
56	Gangyal	Baldev Singh Billoria	BJP
57	Gangyal–II	Inderjeet Kour	INC
58	Digiana	Tirath Kour	BJP
59	Paloura Top	Ashok Singh	IND
60	Paloura Centre	Rajni Bala	INC
61	Patta Paloura	Mohinder Kumar	BJP
62	Chinore/Keran-1	Rekha	BJP
63	Chinore/Keran-2	Kuldeep Singh	BJP
64	Chak Changarwan	Kapil Singh Chib	BJP
65	Barnai/Upper Dharmal	Anita Sharma	IND
66	Upper Muthi	Tripta Devi	BJP
67	Lower Muthi	Suraj Prakash	BJP
68	Greater Kailash	Anil Kumar	BJP
69	Sainik Colony-1	Gurmeet Kour Randhawa	BJP
70	Sainik Colony-2	Narinder Singh	BJP
71	Tawi Vihar Sidhra	Shama Akhtar	IND
72	Shehzadpur	Rachpal Bhardwaj	INC
73	Bhour Gadigarh	Youdhvir Singh	IND
74	Sunjwan	Sobat Ali	IND
75	Akalpur	Ghar Singh Chib	IND

== See also ==
- List of municipal corporations in India
