= Bhagalpur Municipal Corporation =

Local civic body in Bhagalpur, Bihar, India

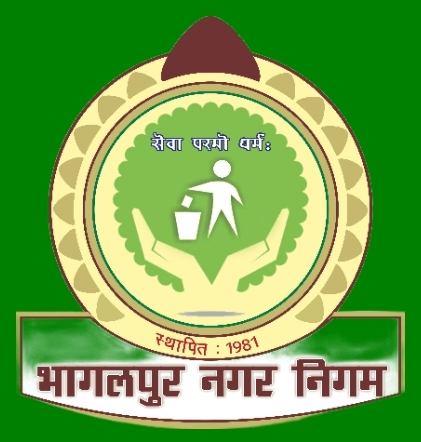
- Seal of the Bhagalpur Municipal Corporation

Type
- Type: Municipal corporation
- Established: 1864; 162 years ago as Nagarpalika

Leadership
- Mayor: Dr. Basundhara Lal (BJP)
- Municipal Commissioner: Yogesh Kumar Sagar (IAS)
- Seats: 51

Elections
- Last election: 2022

Meeting place
- Adampur, Bhagalpur, Bihar – 812001

Website
- nagarseva.bihar.gov.in/bhagalpur

Bhagalpur Municipal Corporation is the municipal corporation governing the Indian city of Bhagalpur, Bihar. Municipal Corporation mechanism in India was introduced during British Rule with formation of municipal corporation in Madras (Chennai) in 1688, later followed by municipal corporations in Bombay (Mumbai) and Calcutta (Kolkata) by 1762. Bhagalpur Municipal Corporation is headed by Mayor of city and governed by Commissioner.

== History and administration ==
Bhagalpur become Nagarpalika in 1864. After that Bhagalpur Nagarpalika promoted to Bhagalpur Municipal Corporation on dated 15 April 1981. Bhagalpur Municipal Corporation received a notification from governor of Bihar on dated 24 April 1981 whose letter no is 572 and will follow the Patna Municipal Corporation Act, 1951. Now presently Bhagalpur Municipal Corporation is follow the Nagarpalika Act, 2007 Which is notified by Government of Bihar? The first elections of the councilors were completed in 2002.

Bhagalpur Municipal Corporation has been categorised into 51 wards and each ward is headed by councillor for which elections are held every 5 years.

Bhagalpur Municipal Corporation is governed by mayor Dr. Basundhara Lal (BJP) and administered by Municipal Commissioner Yogesh Kumar Sagar (IAS).

== Functions ==
Bhagalpur Municipal Corporation is created for the following functions:

- Planning for the town including its surroundings which are covered under its Department's Urban Planning Authority .
- Approving construction of new buildings and authorising use of land for various purposes.
- Improvement of the town's economic and Social status.
- Arrangements of water supply towards commercial, residential and industrial purposes.
- Planning for fire contingencies through Fire Service Departments.
- Creation of solid waste management, public health system and sanitary services.
- Working for the development of ecological aspect like development of Urban Forestry and making guidelines for environmental protection.
- Working for the development of weaker sections of the society like mentally and physically handicapped, old age and gender biased people.
- Making efforts for improvement of slums and poverty removal in the town.

== Revenue ==
The following are the Income sources for the Corporation from the Central and State Government

=== Revenue from taxes ===
Following is the tax related revenue for the corporation:

- Property tax
- Profession tax
- Entertainment tax
- Grants from Central and State Government like Goods and Services Tax
- Advertisement tax

=== Revenue from non-tax sources ===
Following is the non-tax related revenue for the corporation:

- Water usage charges
- Fees from Documentation services
- Rent received from municipal property
- Funds from municipal bonds

== See also ==
- List of municipal corporations in India
