= Gangtok Municipal Corporation =

Local civic body in Gangtok, Sikkim, India

History
- Founded: 2010; 16 years ago

Leadership
- Mayor: Tshering Palden Bhutia
- Deputy Mayor: Sara Lama
- Municipal Commissioner: Gayden Chopel

Structure
- Seats: 19
- Length of term: 5 years

Elections
- Voting system: First-past-the-post
- Last election: 2026
- Next election: 2031

Website
- gmc.sikkim.gov.in

Gangtok Municipal Corporation is the municipal corporation of the capital city of Gangtok in the Sikkim state of India.

== History ==
The Gangtok Municipal Corporation Act, 1975, establishes a Municipal Corporation in Gangtok, and applies to the town of Gangtok. The first-ever historic elections of the Gangtok Municipal Corporation consisting of 15 wards, was held on 27 April 2010. The Corporation was formed as part of the reforms under JNNURM. The councilors took the oath of allegiance to their offices on 12 May 2010. Elections to the post of Mayor and Deputy Mayor were held on the same day. K. N. Topgay and Shakti Singh Choudhary were elected as the First Mayor and First Deputy Mayor of the Gangtok Municipal Corporation respectively. The first phase of the three Fs (functions, functionaries, and funds) depending on the capacity of the corporation was devolved to the corporation vide Gazette Notification No 293, dated 25 June 2010.

== Administration ==
The Municipal Corporation is divided into 19 administrative wards. It consists of democratically elected members (councillors) and is headed by the Mayor. The councillors are chosen through direct election by all the voters residing in the administrative ward for a term of 5 years. Although the Municipal Corporation is the legislative body that lays down policies for the governance of the city, it is the Municipal Commissioner who is responsible for the execution of the policies. The Municipal Commissioner, appointed by the state government, is the head of the executive arm of the corporation and is assisted by various other officers belonging to different departments in the corporation.

=== Wards ===
The total number of municipal wards in Gangtok city was increased from 15 to 17 with addition of two new wards in 2015. In 2020, the number of wards was increased to 19. The newly created wards were Bojoghari 2nd Mile and Pani House.

==== Councillors elected in 2021 Elections (19 Wards) ====
Zone	Ward Number	Ward Name	Areas Covered	Assembly Constituency	Councillor	Political Group
	1	Bojoghari, 2nd Mile Ward			Mr Palzor Lepcha	
	2	Burtuk Ward			Mr Nell Bahadur Chettri	
	3	Lower Sichey Ward			Ms Kala Rai	
	4	Upper Sichey			Ms Aruna Chettri	
	5	Chandmari Ward			Ms Chungkela Lepcha	
	6	Tathangchen Ward			Ms Pema Lhamu Maltha	
	7	Development Area Ward			Mrs Tshering Palden	
	8	Diesel Power House Ward			Ms Bindhya Cintury	
	9	Arithang-I Ward			Mr K Tempo Tapgyal Bhutia	
	10	Arithang-II Ward			Mr Raju Tamang	
	11	Lower MG Marg - Lall Bazaar Ward			Mr Ashok Kr. Prasad	
	12	Upper MG Marg Ward			Mr Sundeep Malu	
	13	Tibet Road Ward			Mrs Diki Lhamu Lepcha	
	14	Deorali Upper Syari Ward			Ms Sabita Pradhan	
	15	Pani House Ward			Mr Norbu Tamang	
	16	Daragaon Lumsey Ward			Mr Milan Gautam	
	17	Tadong Ward			Mr Chewang Thendup	
	18	Tadong 6th Mile			Mrs Rubina Gurung	
	19	Ranipool Ward			Mrs Asha Chettri	

==== List for 17 Wards ====
Zone	Ward Number	Ward Name	Areas Covered	Assembly Constituency	Political Group
	1	Upper Burtuk		28-Upper Burtuk & 29-Kabi Lungchuk	
	2	Lower Burtuk		28-Upper Burtuk & 29-Kabi Lungchuk	
	3	Lower Sichey -I		28-Upper Burtuk	
	4	Lower Sichey -II		28-Upper Burtuk	
	5	Upper Sichey		28-Upper Burtuk	
	6	Chandmari Ward		29-Kabi Lungchuk & 23-Syari	
	7	Development Area		27- Gangtok & 28- Upper Burtuk	
	8	Diesel Power House Ward		27-Gangtok	
	9	Arithang Ward		26-Arithang	
	10	Lower M.G. Marg Ward		26-Arithang	
	11	Upper M.G. Marg		26-Arithang & 27- Gangtok	
	12	Tibet Road Ward		27-Gangtok	
	13	Deorali Ward		25-Upper Tadong & 26-Arithang	
	14	Dara Goan Ward		25-Upper Tadong	
	15	Tadong Ward		22-Namchebong	
	16	Ranipool Ward		22-Namchebong	
	17	Syari/Tathangchen Ward		23-Syari &26- Arithang	

== List of Mayors and Deputy Mayors ==
=== Mayors ===
Sl	Name	Tenure	Ward name
1	K.N. Topgay	2010 - 2014	Chandmari Ward
2	Lashey Doma Bhutia	2014 - 2015	Syari
3	Shakti Singh Choudhary	2015-2020	Upper M.G. Marg
4	Nell Bahadur Chettri	May 2021 -April 2026	Burtuk ward
5	Tshering Palden Bhutia	April 2026-	

=== Deputy Mayors ===
Sl	Name	Tenure	Ward name
1	Shakti Singh Choudhary	2010-2015	Upper M.G. Marg
2	Lassey Doma Bhutia	2015-2020	Tathangchen ST(W)
3	Tshering Palden Bhutia	May 2021 -	Development Area ward

== Gangtok Smart City ==
As per a report from Praja, "Sikkim state government created a Special Purpose Vehicle (SPV) known as Gangtok Smart City Development Limited (GSCDL) for execution of smart city projects in Gangtok. The Smart City Board initially included both the Mayor and Commissioner. But, since Mayor and councilors are not part of the SPV board, they are not able to put forward ward issues under smart city mission projects."

== Revenue sources ==
The following are the Income sources for the corporation from the Central and State Government.

=== Revenue from taxes ===
Following is the Tax related revenue for the corporation.

- Property tax.
- Profession tax.
- Entertainment tax.
- Grants from Central and State Government like Goods and Services Tax.
- Advertisement tax.

=== Revenue from non-tax sources ===
Following is the Non Tax related revenue for the corporation.

- Water usage charges.
- Fees from Documentation services.
- Rent received from municipal property.
- Funds from municipal bonds.
