= Itanagar Municipal Corporation =

Local civic body in Itanagar, Arunachal Pradesh, India

Type
- Type: Municipal Corporation
- Term limits: 5 years

Leadership
- Mayor: Likha Nari Tadar, BJP since 2026
- Deputy Mayor: Tok Tabin Camdir, BJP since 2026
- Municipal Commissioner: Kego Jilen

Structure
- Seats: 20
- Political groups: Government (14): BJP (14); Opposition (6): NCP (3); LJP (R) (2); IND (1)

Elections
- Voting system: First-past-the-post
- Last election: 2025
- Next election: 2030

Website
- https://www.imc.arunachal.gov.in/

The Itanagar Municipal Corporation or IMC is the municipal body which governs and maintains the city of Itanagar, the capital of the Indian state of Arunachal Pradesh. AMC is headed by Likha Nari Tadar the present Mayor of Agartala.

== History ==
On 14 August 2013, Itanagar Municipal Corporation was inaugurated to provide municipal governance for the capital region. In 2019, The Arunachal Pradesh Municipal Corporation Act, 2019 was enacted to provide a statutory framework for municipal corporations in the state of Arunachal Pradesh.

== Composition ==
There are 20 wards under the Municipal Corporation, each with its own elected councillor. In 2025, out of the 20 wards, seven Wards- 1, 3, 5, 7, 8, 18, and 20 were reserved for women.
