= Imphal Municipal Corporation =

Local civic body in Imphal, Manipur, India

Imphal Municipal Corporation Yumphal

Type
- Type: Municipal Corporation
- Term limits: 5 years

Leadership
- Mayor: Vacant
- Deputy Mayor: Vacant
- Seats: 27 Councillors

Elections
- Last election: 2016
- Next election: 2024

Website
- https://imc.mn.gov.in/

Imphal Municipal Corporation is a municipal body that governs Imphal, the capital city of the Indian state of Manipur.

== History ==
In 1992, the Imphal Municipal Board was upgraded to a Municipal Council under the Manipur Municipality Act. In 2014, the council was upgraded to Imphal Municipal Corporation (IMC).

On 25 May 2024, IMC got is its first time property tax in advance under Manipur Municipalities (Property Tax) Rules, 2019.

== Composition ==
There are 27 wards under the Municipal Corporation, each with its own elected councillor. There are eight committees and five sections at the corporation to govern the administration of the city. In 2022, out of the 27 wards, nine seats were reserved for women and three seats were reserved for Scheduled Tribes.

== Election ==
=== 2016 Imphal Municipal Corporation election ===
In the last election held in 2016, with INC won 12 seats, BJP won 10 seats, and independent candidates won 5 seats. Three Independents supported the INC and formed government. Laisangbam Lokeshwar was elected as the Mayor and Sujata Phaomei as Deputy Mayor.

== Controversies ==
In 2016, CAG Report on Panchayati Raj Institutions and ULBs, the Urban Local Bodies including IMC shows many financial irregularities like Diversion of Fund, Short realization of Municipal Revenue, non remittance of Government revenue and irregular cash withrawal from bank through self-cheques.

In 2018, a person after filing RTI queries alleged IMC of financial irregularity in revenue collection of parking fees.

In July 2019, the governor of Manipur suspended the IMC for six months for alleged financial irregularities and abuse of power.

In Jun 2022, Imphal Corporator Gaidon sent to jail.
