= Dibrugarh Municipal Corporation =

Local civic body in Assam, India

Type
- Type: Municipal Corporation

History
- Founded: 1873; 153 years ago

Leadership
- Mayor: Dr. Saikat Patra, BJP
- Commissioner: Jay Vikas, IAS 2021

Structure
- Seats: 22
- Political groups: Government (21); NDA (21): BJP (21); Opposition (1): INC (1)

Elections
- Last election: April 2022
- Next election: 2027

Meeting place
- Dibrugarh, Assam

Website
- dmcdibrugarh.in

Dibrugarh Municipal Corporation (DMC) is the local government in Dibrugarh, Assam, India. It was formed in the year 2024 by upgrading Dibrugarh Municipal Board under The Assam Municipal Corporation (Amendment) Act. Dibrugarh Municipal Board was one of the oldest municipalities in North East India, established in 1873. The city since then has become an important nerve center of political, administrative, cultural and commercial activities of a vast region comprising entire eastern Assam, Arunachal Pradesh and Nagaland. It was proposed to be upgraded as Municipal Corporation in October 2021. On 16 September 2022 Assam Legislative Assembly passed The Assam Municipal Corporation (Amendment) Bill. With this, Silchar & Dibrugarh Municipal Boards have been selected to upgrade into Municipal Corporations. On 7 March 2024 it was formally upgraded as Municipal Corporation followed by Oath taking ceremony on 21 June 2024 thus becoming second city of Assam to have municipal corporation Dibrugarh Municipal Corporation is divided into 22 municipal wards and Dr. Saikat Patra of BJP is the first mayor of DMC.

== History ==
The British arrived in Assam in 1826 as per Yandaboo Accord and since then they selected Dibrugarh as a centre of Administration as well as business purpose in Upper Assam. In 1842 Dibrugarh was announced as the headquarters of Lakhimpur District. The court was also shifted to Dibrugarh in the same year from Lakhimpur.

== List of Mayors & Deputy Mayors ==
=== Mayors ===
Year	Mayor	Ward No.	Party
2022	Dr. Saikat Patra	14.	BJP

=== Deputy mayor ===
Year	Deputy Mayor	Ward No.	Party
2022	Ujjal Phukan	11.	BJP

== List of Corporation Councilors ==
2022 Dibrugarh Municipal Corporation Elections
Ward No.	Councillor	Party	Votes	Margin
1.	Gautam Dutta	BJP		
2.	Darshan Das			
3.				
4.	Pranab Kalita			
5.	Dibyajyoti Hazarika			
6.	Hemlata Saikia			
7.	Binuma Das			
8.	Ratan Paul			
9.	Sraban Kumar Das			
10.	Suman Nahar Hussain Ahmed			
11.	Ujjal Phukan(Dy.Mayor)	BJP		
12.	Pompi Roy Choudhury			
13.	Topa Dey			
14.	Dr. Saikat Patra(Mayor)	BJP		
15.	Sikha Choudhury			
16.	Mamun Gogoi Mitra			
17.	Nirupa Dutta			
18.	Simanta Baruah			
19.	Moonmoon Das			
20.	Dipali Dey			
21.	Bratish Kanti Das			
22.	Sima Das			

== Geography ==
Dibrugarh is located along 27' 28' N latitude and 94' 35' E longitude. The present municipal area of Dibrugarh is 15.5 km^{2} and is divided into 22 wards of now dissolved Dibrugarh Municipal Board. Planning going on to expand the city area in phased manner by incorporating the outgrowths, census town and villages of East and West Revenue Circles.

Proposed Dibrugarh Master Plan area consist of:

a. Present Dibrugarh Municipal Corporation Area = 15.5 sq. km.

b. Two outgrowths (Tekelachiring and Mohpuwalimora)

c Two Census town (AMC area and Niz Mankotta) = 8.53 sq.km.

d. 13 Semi urbanised villages of Dibrugarh East and West Revenue Circle = 23.42 sq.km.

e. 53 villages of Dibrugarh East Revenue Circle

f. 115 villages of Dibrugarh West Revenue Circle

g. 2 villages of Moran Revenue Circle

h. 1 Reserve Forest (Jokai) = 343.56 sq.km.

Total Area = 391 sq.km.

Note: Municipal area to be extended up to 47.45 sq.km at first from existing 15.5 sq.km. covering the

area as shown above from (a) to (d)
