= Faridabad Municipal Corporation =

Local civic body in Faridabad, Haryana, India

Type
- Type: Municipal Corporation
- Term limits: 5 years

History
- Founded: 1993; 33 years ago

Leadership
- Mayor: Praveen Joshi, BJP since 2 March 2025
- Municipal Commissioner: A. Mona Srinivas, IAS

Structure
- Seats: 46
- Political groups: Government (39): BJP (39); Opposition (7): INC (1); IND (6)
- Length of term: 5 years

Elections
- Voting system: First-past-the-post
- Last election: 2 March 2025
- Next election: 2030

Meeting place
- Faridabad, Haryana

Website
- https://mcfaridabad.in

The Municipal Corporation Faridabad (MCF) is the Municipal Corporation responsible for the city of Faridabad in Haryana state. Municipal Corporation mechanism in India was introduced during British Rule with formation of municipal corporation in Madras (Chennai) in 1688, later followed by municipal corporations in Bombay (Mumbai) and Calcutta (Kolkata) by 1762.Faridabad Municipal Corporation has been formed with functions to improve the infrastructure of town. It divides the city of Faridabad into 46 wards and was created in the year 1993.

== List of Mayors ==
No.	Mayor	Party	Term start	Term end	Notes / References
8	Suman Bala	Bharatiya Janata Party	13 February 2017	13 February 2022	8th Mayor & 3rd female Mayor of Faridabad.

== History and administration ==
Faridabad Municipal Corporation was formed to improve the infrastructure of the town as per the needs of local population. Faridabad Municipal Corporation has been categorised into wards and each ward is headed by councilor for which elections are held every 5 years.

Faridabad Municipal Corporation is governed by mayor and administered by Municipal Commissioner Yashpal Yadav.

== Revenue sources ==
The following are the Income sources for the Corporation from the Central and State Government.

=== Revenue from taxes ===
Following is the Tax related revenue for the corporation.

- Property tax.
- Profession tax.
- Entertainment tax.
- Grants from Central and State Government like Goods and Services Tax.
- Advertisement tax.

=== Revenue from non-tax sources ===
Following is the Non Tax related revenue for the corporation.

- Water usage charges.
- Fees from Documentation services.
- Rent received from municipal property.
- Funds from municipal bonds.

== Members ==
The Faridabad Municipal Corporation (FMC) consists of 46 elected members (corporators) who serve a five-year term. The corporation is headed by the Mayor, who is also directly elected for a five-year term. The most recent municipal elections were held in 2025.

Mayor: Praveen Joshi
Ward No	Name of Corporator	Party
1	Mukesh Dagar	Bhartiya Janta Party
2	Rajes Dagar	Bhartiya Janta Party
3	Ravi Kashyap	Bhartiya Janta Party
4	Sangeeta Bhardwaj	Bharatiya Janata Party
5	Sheetal Khatana	Bhartiya Janta Party
6	Gaytri Devi	Bhartiya Janta Party
7	Savita Bhadana	Bharatiya Janata Party
8	Rakesh Devi	Bhartiya Janata Party
9	Sangeeta Bhatiya	Bharatiya Janata Party
10	Bhagwan Singh	Bharatiya Janata Party
11	Babita Bhadana	Bhartiya Janta Party
12	Suman Bala	Bhartiya Janta Party
13	Hari Gileti	Bhartiya Janta Party
14	Naresh Nambardar	Bhartiya Janta Party
15	Jaswant Singh	Bhartiya Janta Party
16	Manoj Naswa	Bhartiya Janta Party
17	Shobha Rani	Bhartiya Janta Party
18	Karambir Singh Bhaisla	Bhartiya Janta Party
19	Jagat Singh	Bhartiya Janta Party
20	Likhi Chaprana	Indian National Congress
21	Virender Bhadana Binde	Bhartiya Janta Party
22	Harinder Bhadana	Bhartiya Janta Party
23	Gajender Bhadana Lala Ji	Bhartiya Janta Party
24	Jitender Yadav	Independent politician
25	Seema	Bhartiya Janta Party
26	Lal Kumar Mishra	Bhartiya Janta Party
27	Saroj Bala	Bhartiya Janta Party
28	Umesh Sharma	Independent politician
29	Ajay Baisla	Bhartiya Janta Party
30	Anil Kumar	Bhartiya Janta Party
31	Shaifali Singla	Bhartiya Janta Party
32	Vinod Bhati	Bhartiya Janta Party
33	Jyoti	Bharatiya Janata Party
34	Sanjeev Kumar	Bhartiya Janta Party
35	Sachin Sharma	Bharatiya Janata Party
36	Kuldeep Sahani	Bhartiya Janta Party
37	Mukesh Kumar Agarwal	Bhartiya Janta Party
38	Anita Kumari	Bhartiya Janta Party
39	Neelam Bareja	Independent politician
40	Pawan Yadav	Independent politician
41	Mahesh Goyal	Bhartiya Janta Party
42	Deepak Yadav	Independent politician
43	Rashmi Deepak Yadav	Independent politician
44	Pardeep Tongar	Bhartiya Janta Party
45	Kiran Bala	Bhartiya Janta Party
46	Sonu Vaishnav	Bhartiya Janta Party

== See also ==
- Faridabad
