= Madhu Azad =

Indian politician

Madhu Azad is an Indian politician from Haryana representing the Bharatiya Janata Party. In the 2017 Gurgaon Municipal Corporation election, she was elected as the mayor of Gurgaon. She is first woman mayor of Gurugram. Her term as mayor ended in 2022. The election was delayed as the delimitation exercise was not yet completed.

She is from Gurugram, Haryana. She married Ashok Azad, a BJP party worker for over two decades.

She made her electoral debut representing the BJP and won from Ward Number 7 in 2017 election and became a unanimous candidate after BJP president Subhash Barala held meetings with other party councillors and an all-woman team was formed.

In November 2017, BJP won 14 seats in the 35 wards and with the mayor seat reserved for women belonging to Scheduled Caste in 2017, Azad won the post unopposed. In the elections held to the Municipal Corporation of Gurgaon in September 2017, 20 independent candidates won and BJP managed to secure the support of 12 councillors and won the Mayor post.

== Controversies ==
In December 2019, 19 councillors wrote to the divisional commissioner demanding removal of the mayor and her deputies, under Haryana Municipal Corporation Act 1994 section 74, for allegedly running the corporation without taking the councillors into confidence.

In September 2021, she had differences with the superintending engineer of MCG regarding a blocked drain in ward 22, and following her complaint, the engineer was suspended by the Haryana home and urban local bodies minister Anil Vij. It resulted in a protest by the municipal corporation workers that went on for three weeks. In turn, the engineering department workers raised allegations of her son attending the council meetings but she denied them, saying any resident could attend the civic meetings and raise the issues of their wards.
