= Jabalpur Municipal Corporation =

Local civic body in Jabalpur, Madhya Pradesh, India

Type
- Type: Municipal Corporation

History
- Founded: 1864

Leadership
- Mayor: Jagat Bahadur Singh "Annu", BJP
- Chairman: Rinku Vij, BJP
- Municipal commissioner: Swapnil Wankhede, IAS

Structure
- Seats: 79
- Political groups: Government (44): BJP (44); Opposition (26): INC (26); Others (9): IND (7); AIMIM (2)

Elections
- Last election: 2022
- Next election: 2027

Motto
- अनिर्वेदः श्रियोमूलम् "Progress is always done, by continuous work"

Meeting place
- Jabalpur, Madhya Pradesh

Website
- www.nagarnigamjabalpur.com

Jabalpur Municipal Corporation is the Municipal Corporation responsible for the civic infrastructure and administration of the city of Jabalpur, located in Madhya Pradesh, India. The organization is known, in short, as JMC. This civic administrative body administers an area of 263.49 km^{2} (101.73 sq mi). JMC's mayor is Congress leader Jagat Bahadur Annu and municipal commissioner is Swapnil Wankhade IAS. The current collector of Jabalpur is Karmveer Sharma. Jabalpur was one of the first municipalities in India, founded in 1864. The mayor post is currently held by the Bharatiya Janata Party as a result of the defection of sitting Indian National Congress mayor Jagat Bahadur Singh "Annu" to the Bharatiya Janata Party.

== Overview ==
The total area under JMC is 263.49 km^{2} (101.73 sq mi). The city is currently divided into 79 wards. Each ward elects a corporator. The winning party elects a council of members, who are responsible for various departments. The council members chose the Mayor among themselves. At present, there are seventy nine members in the council. The Commissioner of Jabalpur is the highest officer of Municipal Corporate Office, which is responsible for the departments of public works, revenue and tax, water supply, planning and development, fire brigade, health and sanitation, finance and accounts etc.

== History ==
=== Pre-independence ===
Jabalpur Municipal Corporation was established as Jabalpur Municipal Committee under Lucknow Nagar Palika Act of 1864 under which Dy. Commissioner was named as Chairman of Municipality. W. H. Newhard became the first person to hold the post.

The first pre-independence Nagar Palika president of Jabalpur was Lt. Babu Kanchedi Lal Jain of Lal Bangla. Nagar Nigam was also built under the supervision of Shri Babu Kanchedilal Jain of Lal Bangla, that is why the architecture and colour pallet of Lal Bangla and Nagar Nigam Resemble each other very closely.

In the year 1935 the state government took over the total administration of the Municipal Committee, and Murli Manohar Seth was appointed as its administrator.

=== Post-independence ===
After Independence, in 1948 the Nagar Palika Act (Act No.3-1948) was passed. Under this Act on 1 June 1950 Jabalpur Nagar Nigam was established and the city was divided into 30 wards. A 43-member committee was set up in which 34 members were directly elected, 6 were selected members, and 3 nominated members. On 20 October 1959 in a special called meeting, the motto of the organization was decided as Anirvedah Shriyomoolam.

== Election results ==
=== Municipal Corporation ===
==== 2014 ====
Party	Seats won
BJP	42
INC	29
SHS	2
IND	6
Source: Dainik Bhaskar

==== 2022 ====
Party	Seats won	Seats +/−
BJP	44	▲2
INC	26	▼3
AIMIM	2	▲2
IND	7	▲1
Source: Dainik Bhaskar

=== Mayoral election ===
==== 2014 ====
Party	Candidate	Votes
BJP	Dr. Swati Godbole	298,433
INC	Geeta Sharat Tiwari	212,942
BSP	Shakun Ahirwar	19,074
Independent	Others	?
Others	Others	?
NOTA	N/A	6,948
Source: Dainik Bhaskar

==== 2022 ====
Party	Candidate	Votes
INC	Jagat Bahadur Singh	293,192
BJP	Dr. Jitendra Jamdar	248,853
BSP	Lakham Ahirvar	19,419
Independent	Others	7,321
Others	Others	10,358
NOTA	N/A	6,337
Source: Dainik Bhaskar

== Functions ==
Jabalpur Municipal Corporation is created for the following functions:

- Planning for the town including its surroundings which are covered under its Department's Urban Planning Authority .
- Approving construction of new buildings and authorising use of land for various purposes.
- Improvement of the town's economic and Social status.
- Arrangements of water supply towards commercial, residential and industrial purposes.
- Planning for fire contingencies through Fire Service Departments.
- Creation of solid waste management, public health system and sanitary services.
- Working for the development of ecological aspect like development of Urban Forestry and making guidelines for environmental protection.
- Working for the development of weaker sections of the society like mentally and physically handicapped, old age and gender biased people.
- Making efforts for improvement of slums and poverty removal in the town.

== Revenue sources ==
The following are the Income sources for the Corporation from the Central and State Government.

=== Revenue from taxes ===
Following is the Tax related revenue for the corporation.

- Property tax.
- Profession tax.
- Entertainment tax.
- Grants from Central and State Government like Goods and Services Tax.
- Advertisement tax.

=== Revenue from non-tax sources ===
Following is the Non Tax related revenue for the corporation.

- Water usage charges.
- Fees from Documentation services.
- Rent received from municipal property.
- Funds from municipal bonds.

== See also ==
- List of municipal corporations in India
