= Bhopal Municipal Corporation =

Governing body of the Indian city of Bhopal

Type
- Type: Municipal corporation

Leadership
- Mayor: Malti Rai, BJP
- Municipal commissioner: Kolsani V.S. Choudhary IAS

Structure
- Seats: 85
- Political groups: Government (59): BJP (59); Opposition (20): INC (20); Others (6): IND (6)

Elections
- Last election: 6 July 2022
- Next election: 2027

Meeting place
- Bhopal, Madhya Pradesh

Website
- www.bmconline.gov.in/sap/bc/ui5_ui5/sap/zbmcprdhome/index.html

Bhopal Municipal Corporation (BMC) is the Municipal Corporation for the capital city of Madhya Pradesh. It is responsible for the civic infrastructure and administration of the city of Bhopal. BMC administers an area of 463 km^{2} (250.29 sq mi). BMC is headed by Kolsani V.S. Choudhary (IAS) as the commissioner and Alok Sharma as the mayor. In August 2014, the corporation became one of India’s first municipal corporations to automate citizen services, working with German software company SAP SE for the purpose.

== Overview ==
The total area under BMC is 463 km^{2} (250.29 sq mi). The city is divided into 85 wards. Each ward elects a corporator. The winning party elects a council of members, who are responsible for various departments. The council members chose the mayor among themselves. At present, there are ten members in the council. The Commissioner of Bhopal is the highest officer of Municipal Corporate Office, which is responsible for the departments of public works, revenue and tax, water supply, planning and development, fire brigade, health and sanitation, finance and accounts etc. The current Municipal Commissioner of Bhopal is Kolsani V.S. Choudhary (IAS) while the current mayor is Alok Sharma.

== History ==
Majlis-e-intezamia was the name of first municipal body of Bhopal, which came into being in 1907 in the erstwhile Bhopal State. First city survey was conducted in 1916 after the enactment of Municipal Act. Up to 1956 the area under Bhopal Municipal limit was very small, but after that few more surrounding villages were added to it. The total area under Bhopal municipal limit reached to 71.23 km^{2} by 1975.

The Municipal Board was constituted for the first time in 1952 with Shri. Abdul Karim Babu Miya as president and Shri. Deendayal as vice-president. Later on the status of Municipal board was upgraded to municipal council & an IAS officer was appointed as Chief Administrator. In 1983, Bhopal Municipal Council got the status of Municipal Corporation, with total 56 wards and Dr. R.K. Bisaria of Congress was elected as the first mayor.

== Wards ==
Zone	Ward Number	Ward Name	Areas Covered	Assembly Constituency	Councillor	Political Group
	1	Mahatma Gandhi Ward			Laxman Rajput	INC
	2	Airport ward			Kusum Chaturvedi	BJP
	3	Bhauri ward			Karishma Meena	BJP
	4	Hemu colony ward			Rajesh Hingorani	BJP
	5	Sadhu waswani ward			Ashok Maran	INC
	6	Mahavir giri ward			Jyoti Yadav	BJP
	7	Koh-e-fiza ward			Priyanka Mishra	INC
	8	Royal market ward			Rehana Sultan	INC
	9	Bagh munshi hussain ward			Nahid Saad	INC
	10	Eidgaah hills ward			Saroj Mewade	BJP
	11	Babu jagjivan ram ward			Anita kanerji	Independent
	12	Nariyal kheda ward			Devendra Bhargava	BJP
	13	Geetanjali ward			Manoj Rathore	BJP
	14	Shahjahanabad ward			Shiba Masood Ali	INC
	15	J.P. nagar ward			Shailesh Sahu	BJP
	16	Motilal nehru ward			Mohd Sarwar	INC
	17	Ibrahimganj ward			Sheetal Verma	Congress
	18	Ram mandir ward			Raju Kushwaha	BJP
	19	Lal bahadur shastri ward			Wasimuddin Syed	INC
	20	Mahavir swami ward			Puja Sharma	BJP
	21	Jain mandir ward			Vinita Soni	BJP
	22	Moti masjid ward			Samer Huzur	Independent
	23	Islampura ward			Laeeka Bi	INC
	24	Rani kamlapati ward			Shabista Sultan	INC
	25	Swami Vivekananda Ward			Jagdish Yadav	BJP
	26	Dr.Ambedkar ward			Rajmani Uike	BJP
	27	Goswami tulsidas ward			Binu Saxena	INC
	28	Rani Awantibai ward			Kishan Suryavanshi	BJP
	29	Maulana abdul kalam azad ward			Devanshu Kansana	INC
	30	Kushabhau thakre ward			Pravin Saxena	INC
	31	Chhtrapati Shivaji ward			Brijula Sachan	BJP
	32	Jawahar lal nehru ward			Arti Aneja	BJP
	33	Pt. madanmohan malviya			RK Singh	BJP
	34	Ravindra nath tagore			Vilash Ghadge	Independent
	35	Jahangirabad ward			Shrine Khan	INC
	36	Chandbad ward			Gita Mali	BJP
	37	Kapdamil ward			Vandana Kushwah	BJP
	38	Semra ward			Gauri Pathak	BJP
	39	Naveen nagar ward			Anand Kumar	BJP
	40	Aishbagh ward			Masarat Jahan	Independent
	41	Baag farhat afja ward			Mohd Sagir Khan	Independent
	42	Maharani laxmibai ward			Mohd Azizuddin	INC
	43	Maharana pratap ward			Nasem Gafoor	INC
	44	Subhash chandra bose ward			Vimlesh Thakur	BJP
	45	Indira gandhi ward			Shikha Gohal	Independent
	46	Pt. Ravishankar shukla			Yogendra Singh	INC
	47	Dr Rajendra prasad ward			Girja Khatik	BJP
	48	Arera colony ward			Arvind Verma	BJP
	49	Asha niketan ward			Babulal Yadav	BJP
	50	Gulmohar ward			Sushma Babisha	BJP
	51	Shahpura ward			Snehlata Raghuvansi	BJP
	52	Misraud ward			Sheela Patidar	BJP
	53	Jaatkhedi ward			Pratap Vare	BJP
	54	Barkatullah ward			Jitendra Shukla	BJP
	55	Bagh mugaliya ward			Archna Parmar	BJP
	56	Barkheda pathani ward			Neeraj Singh	BJP
	57	Saket shakti ward			Surendra Vadika	BJP
	58	Kasturba ward			Rakesh Yadav	BJP
	59	Barkheda Bhel ward			Anita Shukrawre	BJP
	60	Govindpura ward			Shakti Rao	BJP
	61	Khajuri kala ward			Madhu Shivnani	BJP
	62	Hatai kheda ward			Rakesh Chouksey	BJP
	63	Gautam buddha ward			Shivlal Makoria	BJP
	64	Sonagiri ward			Chhaya Thakur	BJP
	65	Govindpura Audhogik kshetra ward			Shiromani Sharma	BJP
	66	Narela shankri ward			Jitendra Thakur	Congress
	67	Indrapuri ward			Mamta Bai	BJP
	68	Ayodhya nagar ward			Urmila Maurya	BJP
	69	Guru nanak dev ward			Suryakant Gupta	BJP
	70	Punjabi baag ward			Ashok Vani	BJP
	71	Dusshera maidan ashoka garden ward			Shradha Dubey	BJP
	72	Rajiv gandhi ward			Vikash Patel	BJP
	73	Bhopal Memorial Aspataal ward			Raju Rathore	BJP
	74	Bhanpur ward			Shakun Singh	BJP
	75	Badbai ward			Rita Vishwakarma	BJP
	76	Chhola ward			Srikant Rai	BJP
	77	Rusalli ward			Danish Khan	INC
	78	Karond ward			Mohd Raees	Congress
	79	Navibag ward			Anju Rajput	BJP
	80	Sarvadharm kolar ward			Sunita Bhadoria	BJP
	81	Kanhakunj ward			Babita Dongare	BJP
	82	Danish kunj ward			Jyoti Mishra	BJP
	83	Sankhedi ward			Ravindra Yati	BJP
	84	Ratanpur sadak ward			Shobhana Maran	BJP
	85	Katara ward			Ruma Rajput	BJP

== Elections ==
=== 2022 election ===
S.No.	Party name	Party flag or symbol	Number of corporators
01	Bharatiya Janata Party (BJP)		58
02	Indian National Congress (INC)		21
03	Independents		06

=== 2015 election ===
S.No.	Party name	Party flag or symbol	Number of corporators
01	Bharatiya Janata Party (BJP)		55
02	Indian National Congress (INC)		26
03	Independents		04

== Departments ==
- Public Works
- Revenue & Tax
- Heritage Cell
- Garden
- Public Relation
- Water Supply
- Planning & Development
- General Administration
- Fire Services
- Health & Sanitation
- Finance
- e-Governance

== Revenue sources ==
The following are the Income sources for the Corporation from the Central and State Government.

=== Revenue from taxes ===
Following is the Tax related revenue for the corporation.

- Property tax.
- Profession tax.
- Entertainment tax.
- Grants from Central and State Government like Goods and Services Tax.
- Advertisement tax.

=== Revenue from non-tax sources ===
Following is the Non Tax related revenue for the corporation.

- Water usage charges.
- Fees from Documentation services.
- Rent received from municipal property.
- Funds from municipal bonds.

== See also ==
- List of municipal corporations in India
