= Durga Bari (Gaya) =

Durga Bari दुर्गाबाड़ी (Hindi)
- Neighbourhood
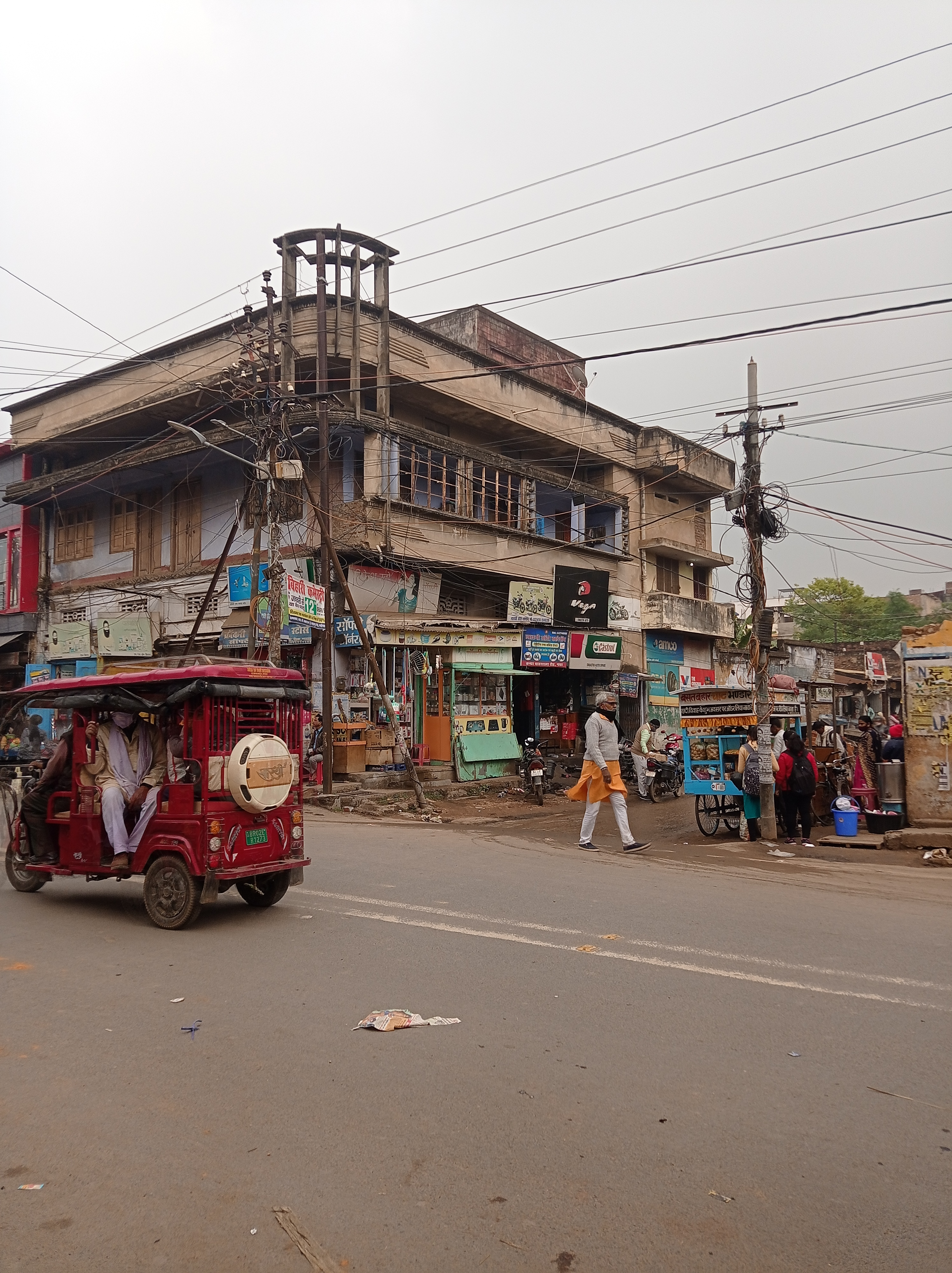
- Gautam Buddha Road in Durga Bari, Gaya

- Location within Bihar Location within India
- Coordinates: 24°47′33″N 85°00′25″E
- Country: India
- State: Bihar
- City: Gaya

Government
  - Body: Gaya Nagar Nigam

Language
  - Official: Hindi, Urdu
  - Spoken: Magadhi, Hindi, Urdu
- Time zone: UTC+5:30
- PIN: 823001

Durga Bari (Hindi: दुर्गाबाड़ी, romanized: durgā-bāṛī) is a residential-cum commercial neighborhood under the Civil Lines thana jurisdiction of Gaya, Bihar, India. It is located south of Dulhingunj neighborhood while facing Falgu River eastwards. The area is known for serving several Hindu temples dedicated to goddess Durga and usually gets crowded during the annual Durga Puja celebrations.
