= Rajendra Tower =

Clock tower in Gaya, Bihar

- Rajendra Tower, August 2022
- Alternative names: Tower Chowk

General information
- Location: Gaya, India
- Completed: Between 1910 and 1914

Rajendra Tower (Hindi: राजेन्द्र टावर), locally known as Tower Chowk, is a historic clock tower in Gaya, Bihar, India. Built sometime between 1910 and 1914 during the British rule by the-then collector George Oldhum, it was renamed as Rajendra Tower after the first Indian president Dr. Rajendra Prasad in 1981 by the administration of Bihar's Chief Minister Jagannath Mishra. The tower is widely considered to be the symbol of the city.

== History ==
The clock tower was built during the British Raj by Oldhum, the-then collector of Gaya district, which was under Bihar and Orissa Province sometime between 1910 and 1914. The clock tower gradually became symbolic for the city of Gaya. After the end of British rule in 1947, the clock tower became the property of the new Indian state of Bihar. It was renamed Rajendra Tower in 1981 after Dr. Rajendra Prasad, the first President of India by the government of Bihar. According to locals, there were four clocks in the tower on each side and people used to hear the chimes of the clock kilometers away, whereas pedestrians used to set their watches, using the tower's clocks. Due to the presence of the clock tower, the area gradually became a commercial district and goes by the name of Tower Chowk.
