= 2022 Assam municipal elections =

Local elections in India

2022 Assam Municipal elections
- 6 March 2022

977 seats
- Turnout: 69.66%
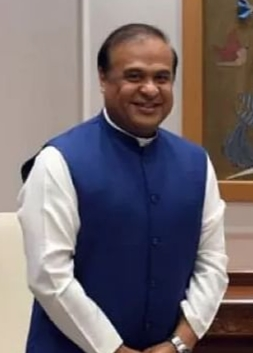

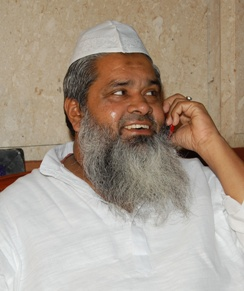

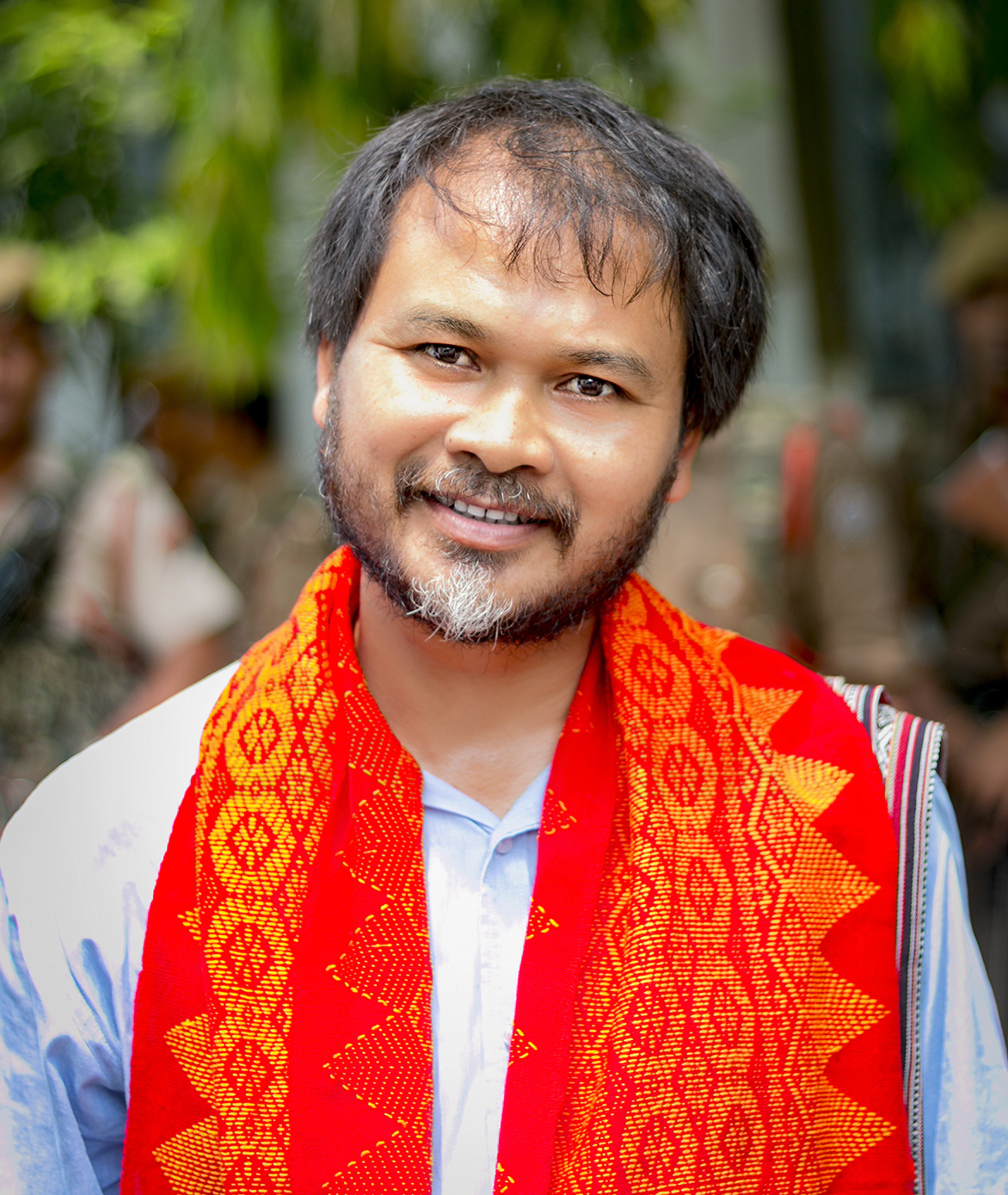

	Majority party	Minority party	Third party
Leader	Himanta Biswa Sarma	Debabrata Saikia	Atul Bora
Party	BJP	INC	AGP
Alliance	NDA	UPA	NDA
Seats won	745	71	125
	Fourth party	Fifth party	Sixth party
Leader	Badruddin Ajmal	Akhil Gogoi	Arvind Kejriwal
Party	AIUDF	RD	AAP

Municipal elections was held in the Indian state of Assam on 6 March 2022; the results were declared on 9 March. The elections was scheduled for 80 urban local bodies. Elections were originally scheduled to be held in 2020, but were delayed because of pandemic.

== Schedule ==
Poll event	Schedule
Notification date	9 February 2022
Last Date for filing nomination	15 February 2022
Last Date for withdrawal of nomination	20 February 2022
Date of poll	6 March 2022
Date of counting of votes	9 March 2022

== Voter statistics ==
Gender	No. of voters.
Male	8,32,348
Female	8,41,534
Other	17
Total	16,73,899

== List of municipalities ward wise ==
Sl. No.	District	Municipal Boards	Wards	Voters (2022)
1	Karimganj	Karimganj Badarpur Ramkrishna Nagar	27 11 10	49,374 14,144 11,094
2	Hailakandi	Hailakandi Lala	16 10	28,474 9,678
3	Cachar	Sonai Lakhipur	11 10	14,077 10,149
4	Dhubri	Dhubri Gauripur Golakganj Chapar Bilasipara Sapatgram	16 13 10 10 14 10	49,144 20,786 10,199 16,438 29,942 10,525
5	Bongaigaon	Bongaigaon Abhayapuri	25 11	39,557 13,169
6	Goalpara	Goalpara Lakhipur	19 10	41,408 10,790
7	Barpeta	Barpeta Barpeta Road Howly Sarthebari Sorbhog	22 10 10 10 10	36,292 28,737 14,385 6,153 6,846
8	Bajali	Patshala Patacharkuchi	10 10	12,817 3,089
9	Nalbari	Nalbari Tihu	17 10	36,599 11,551
10	Kamrup	North Guwahati Palashbari Rangia	10 10 10	19,531 4,213 22,007
11	Darrang	Sipajhar Mongoldoi Kharupetia	10 10 11	9,618 21,001 17,021
12	Morigaon	Morigaon	11	22,896
13	Nagaon	Nagaon Dhing Raha Kampur	29 10 10 10	98,542 15,324 9,612 8,560
14	Hojai	Hojai Lanka Lumding Doboka	19 11 13 10	27,991 30,181 23,750 9,567
15	Sonitpur	Tezpur Rangapara Dhekiajuli Jamugurihat	19 10 10 10	49,594 11,280 16,558 6,712
16	Biswanath	Biswanath Gohpur Sootea	12 10 10	14,662 9,890 9,664
17	Lakhimpur	North Lakhimpur Bihpuria Narayanpur Dhakuakhana	21 10 10 10	44,671 8,912 4,143 10,182
18	Dhemaji	Dhemaji Silapathar	10 12	24,166 19,520
19	Golaghat	Golaghat Sarupathar Barpathar Dergaon Bokakhat	12 10 10 10 10	28,050 11,084 7,716 16,984 14,706
20	Jorhat	Jorhat Teok Titabar Mariani	19 10 10 10	57,095 7,389 13,882 16,784
21	Sibsagar	Sibsagar Amguri Dimow Nazira Simaluguri	14 10 10 10 10	32,196 5,826 6,037 10,188 6,576
22	Charaideo	Sonari Moran	16 11	20,507 5,439
23	Dibrugarh	Dibrugarh Naharkatia Chabua Namrup	22 10 10 10	1,17,690 15,046 6,242 9,976
24	Tinsukia	Tinsukia Makum Doomdooma Chapakhowa Margherita Digboi	15 10 10 10 10 10	78,900 13,543 16,631 8,078 23,263 18,996

== Parties and alliances ==
Following is a list of political parties and alliances which contested in this election:

=== NDA ===
Party		Symbol	Leader	Contesting Seats
Bharatiya Janata Party	BJP		Himanta Biswa Sarma	TBD
Asom Gana Parishad	AGP		Atul Bora	TBD

=== UPA ===
Party		Symbol	Leader	Contesting Seats
Indian National Congress	INC		Debabrata Saikia	TBD
Assam Jatiya Parishad	AJP		Lurinjyoti Gogoi	TBD

=== Other ===
Party		Symbol	Leader	Contesting Seats
All India United Democratic Front	AIUDF		Badruddin Ajmal	TBD
Raijor Dal	RD		Akhil Gogoi	TBD
Aam Aadmi Party	AAP		Dr.Bhaben Chowdhry	TBD

== Voter turnout ==
Sl. No.	District	Municipal Boards	Turnout (%)
1	Karimganj	Karimganj Badarpur Ramkrishna Nagar	65.40 64.86 70.92
2	Hailakandi	Hailakandi Lala	66.65 73.97
3	Cachar	Sonai Lakhipur	74.00 67.49
4	Dhubri	Dhubri Gauripur Golakganj Chapar Bilasipara Sapatgram	70.80 71.30 74.35 81.43 78.19 70.36
5	Bongaigaon	Bongaigaon Abhayapuri	74.32 67.04
6	Goalpara	Goalpara Lakhipur	79.00 82.00
7	Barpeta	Barpeta Barpeta Road Howly Sarthebari Sorbhog	71.55 75.14 80.67 79.90 79.00
8	Bajali	Patshala Patacharkuchi	68.60 79.10
9	Nalbari	Nalbari Tihu	72.27 71.48
10	Kamrup	North Guwahati Palashbari Rangia	59.07 69.34 82.10
11	Darrang	Sipajhar Mongoldoi Kharupetia	75.73 68.18 73.97
12	Morigaon	Morigaon	72.12
13	Nagaon	Nagaon Dhing Raha Kampur	61.14 70.42 70.32 69.89
14	Hojai	Hojai Lanka Lumding Doboka	72.26 68.50 61.29 74.71
15	Sonitpur	Tezpur Rangapara Dhekiajuli Jamugurihat	62.68 69.24 72.00 72.97
16	Biswanath	Biswanath Gohpur Sootea	69.51 69.99 72.07
17	Lakhimpur	North Lakhimpur Bihpuria Narayanpur Dhakuakhana	68.91 73.05 83.01 78.69
18	Dhemaji	Dhemaji Silapathar	67.25 68.42
19	Golaghat	Golaghat Sarupathar Barpathar Dergaon Bokakhat	60.33 71.74 69.58 52.23 67.28
20	Jorhat	Jorhat Teok Titabar Mariani	58.40 72.51 65.19 66.50
21	Sibsagar	Sibsagar Amguri Dimow Nazira Simaluguri	64.36 74.24 66.38 65.11 74.07
22	Charaideo	Sonari Moran	63.52 70.42
23	Dibrugarh	Dibrugarh Naharkatia Chabua Namrup	58.02 64.54 77.79 51.91
24	Tinsukia	Tinsukia Makum Doomdooma Chapakhowa Margherita Digboi	62.73 51.25 54.80 73.12 63.87 59.32
	Total	80 Boards	69.66

== Results ==
"State Election Commission, Assam" https://sec.assam.gov.in
