= Suman Bala (politician) =

Indian politician

Suman Bala is an Indian politician who served as the Mayor of Faridabad Municipal Corporation.
