= Entertainment tax =

Tax levied on entertainment

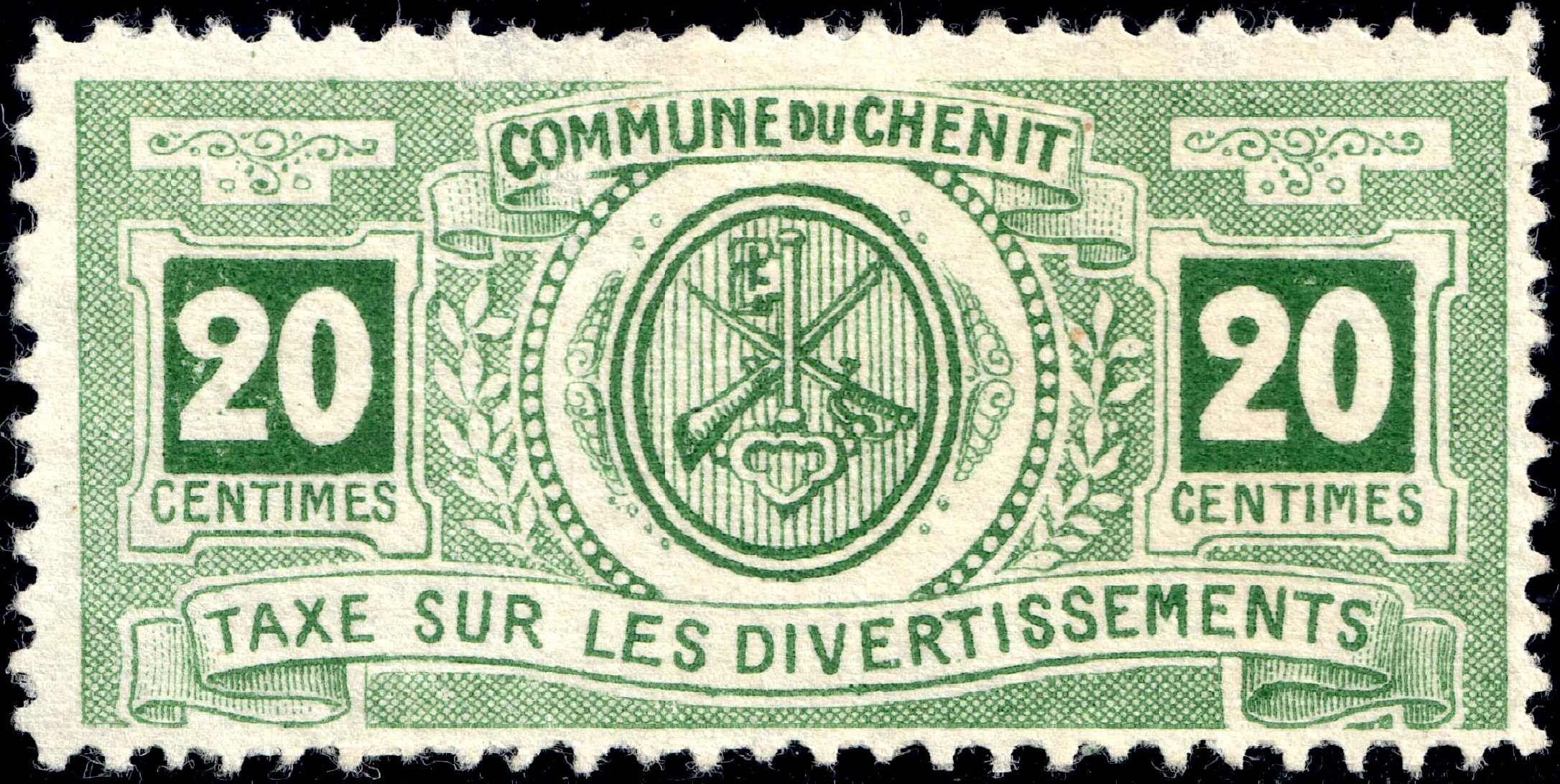
Revenue stamp issued by the Swiss municipality of Le Chenit to pay for entertainment tax (French: taxe sur les divertissements)

Entertainment tax, also sometimes referred to as "amusement tax", is any tax levied on any form of commercial entertainment, such as movie tickets, exhibitions, sport events and more. The specific rules such as the tax rate and cases of tax exemption are subject to local authorities, as is their collection. The entertainment tax has in the most cases the form of indirect tax, which is levied on the buyer. Nowadays, the most discussed subject of those taxes are their implementations to online services, especially the ones working on a streaming basis such as Netflix, Spotify and others.

== India ==
In India, the Entertainment Tax is a tax imposed by the government on feature films getting a wide release in the country and are reduced from gross collections, major commercial shows and big private festivals. The amount after deducting entertainment tax is known as net.

In Delhi, movie tickets, large commercial shows and large private festival celebrations may incur an entertainment tax.

Entertainment falls in List 2 of the Seventh Schedule of the Constitution of India and is exclusively reserved as a revenue source for the state governments. Historically, before India acquired independence, the British government imposed heavy taxes on the events of amusements and entertainment, where a large gathering of Indians could have caused rebellion or mutiny. Thus, various entertainment tax acts of the state governments permit the rate of tax beyond 100%. After independence, old enactments continued and there has been no revision or repeal of these acts.

This source of revenue has grown with the advent of pay television services in India. Since then, entertainment is being provided through the services such as broadcasting services, DTH Services, Pay TV Services, cable services, etc. The component of entertainment is intrinsically intertwined in the transaction of service, that it can not be separated from the whole transaction. Given the nature of transaction of service, it is being subjected to tax both by the Union and the State governments.

The fiscal principle underlying article 246 of the constitution of India separates the sources of taxation for the Union and the States and also maintains the exclusivity. This article also provides that in case of conflict between the powers of Union and the States, the Union power to tax shall supersede the power of the State to levy tax on the taxable event or in relation to the subject or object of taxation. Entertainment tax structure in India varies across states and is the highest in Uttar Pradesh at 60 per cent. In Maharashtra, entertainment tax was reduced by five per cent in 2005 and now stands at 45 per cent. There is no tax for Marathi films in Maharashtra, and in Tamil Nadu, Tamil films are tax free if they have a Tamil title and a U certificate from the Censor Board. Failing any of these, films are imposed a 15% tax.

The entertainment industry in India is facing the challenge of double taxation on such transactions. No State Entertainment Tax Applicable on Gross Tkt Value .

1. Andhra Pradesh - 20% (15% for Telugu Films)
2. Assam, Himachal Pradesh, Jammu & Kashmir, Rajasthan, Punjab and Uttaranchal (Nil)
3. Bihar - 50.00%
4. Delhi- 20.00%
5. Gujarat -50.00% (Nil for Gujrati Films)
6. Haryana -30.00%
7. Jharkhand -110% (Nil for Jharkhandi Films)
8. Karnataka -30% (Nil for Kannada Films)
9. Kerala- 30.00%
10. Madhya Pradesh -20.00%
11. Maharashtra -45% (Nil for Marathi Films)
12. Odisha -25.00% (for Odia Films 99% )
13. Tamil Nadu -15% (Nil for Tamil Films)
14. Uttar Pradesh -30% to 40%
15. West Bengal- 30% (2% for Bengali Films)

=== Maharashtra ===
In Maharashtra, under the Maharashtra Entertainment Duty Act, 1923, The Maharashtra government imposed an additional 10 percent entertainment duty on movie tickets priced between Rs.251 and Rs.350 from January 16, 2013. However, tickets costing between Re.1 and Rs.250 will see no fresh levy. The government has also allowed theatre owners to collect Rs.11 as service charges on all tickets, up from Rs.6 now. The new tax slab is somewhat like this: If a multiplex or theatre owner charges up to Rs 250 per ticket, he will not have to pay any additional surcharge.

If a ticket is priced between Rs 251 and Rs 350, the theatre or multiplex owner will be charged 10 per cent more; if a ticket is priced between Rs 351 and Rs 500, the owner will have to pay 15 per cent more, and if the ticket is priced more than Rs 501, the charge will be 20 per cent more. Mirror has learnt that theatre and multiplex owners will have to go for computerised booking system so that the number of tickets sold is on record. The Central Government's decision is effective from this month, and film and TV actors will be charged 12.36 per cent service tax on their earnings on programmes and endorsements.

As per the new slab, for tickets up to Rs 250, there will be no additional tax other than the existing 45 per cent. For tickets costing Rs 251–350, government will charge 49.5 per cent entertainment tax. For tickets priced at Rs 351–500, the new tax will be 51.75 per cent, while tickets costing Rs 500 and above will attract 54 per cent tax. Maharashtra has 64 multiplexes. The state is expected to get additional revenue of Rs 30 crore in its coffers. Maharashtra has 64 multiplexes and 549 single-screen theatres. The cabinet has also approved to give a five-year tax exemption to single-screen theatres under municipal councils and a seven-year exemption in rural areas. Service tax is 12.36% and Maharashtra VAT is 5% on non-theatrical. The total tax in Maharashtra is 45% as entertainment tax, 5% VAT on non theatrical and in addition there is a stamp duty on the agreements entered in Maharashtra. The VAT on theatrical was waived from May 2011 but there is still a past issue from 2005 to 2011 which the government is yet to exempt. ok the main taxing jurisdiction may exempt foreign-source income from tax, the main taxing jurisdiction may exempt foreign-source income from tax if tax had been paid on it in another jurisdiction, or above some benchmark to not include tax haven jurisdictions, the main taxing jurisdiction may tax the foreign-source income but give a credit for foreign jurisdiction taxes paid.

=== Rajasthan ===
In March 2011, Rajasthan become the first state to exempt theatres from entertainment tax. In March 2009, the Rajasthan government started levying an entertainment tax of 23.08 per cent on gross and 30 per cent on net sales. Earlier in 2008, the government had reduced the entertainment tax from 40 per cent on net to 30 per cent on net sales.

== United States: Chicago ==
In Chicago, the entertainment tax is known as the amusement tax. Nowadays, the amusement tax is levied on cultural events (performances, exhibitions, etc.), commercial events (promotional shows, presentations), sport events of any kind (car races, tennis, horse-races, etc.), entertainment activities for public participation or attended based on paid membership (sport clubs, etc.) and virtually provided amusement services (paid television programmes, etc.) based on streaming basis. The general exemptions are events with religious purposes, events to support the veterans and generally all non-profiting events. The City of Chicago offers at their online site templates for amusement providers to be filled as well as complete guide regarding the amusement tax and the liabilities.

=== Amendments ===
The amusement tax in Chicago has been in effect since 17 February 1986 and has gone through several amendments. It is assigned to section 4-156 in Chicago municipal code. In 1999 the tax rate for middle-sized (750-5,000 people) events was reduced to 3%. Although, the first major amendment was in July 2004 where the original concept was enlarged by above mentioned paid television programmes and paid membership activities. The largest and nowadays most discussed amendment came into effect on 1 July 2015. It introduced a general 9% tax rate with exception for registered reseller for whom the rate is 3% and since 2018 the rate was decreased to 5% for cultural performances which are held in auditoriums with maximum capacity exceeding 750 persons. This rule was changed later that year and now there is total exemption from the tax if the event is live performance and the capacity is less than 1,500 persons. However, the controversy part of this amendment was including the digital streaming and online entertainment platforms as well (Netflix, Spotify, etc.), this expansion is often referred to as "Netflix tax" or "Cloud tax". However, this affects only temporary services, e.g. the music tracks, movies, games and other online goods bought online and downloaded permanently are not subject to this tax (it is subject to digital sales tax, which in the state of Illinois is equal to 6.25%).

=== Controversy ===
The new enlargement for "Netflix tax" was predicted to bring $12 million to the treasury of the city and help to decrease the city's budget deficit which was in 2016 around $500 million. However, the new amusement tax is subject to widespread criticism because of alleged violations of other federal laws, state laws and precedent of the Supreme Court.

== Malta ==
Entertainment excise duty was payable on some theatre, cinema or sporting events. Imprinted excise stamps on such tickets are known from the 1950s to the 1980s.

== Namibia ==
South West Africa introduced entertainment tax by Ordinance 11 of 1930, and issued revenue stamps to pay the tax.

== Russia ==
Russia introduced a tax on theatre and other types of entertainment in 1892.

== South Africa ==
In the early years of the 20th century, the four provinces of the Union of South Africa – Cape Province, Natal Province, Orange Free State Province and Transvaal Province – each introduced their own entertainment taxes. They issued revenue stamps to pay for such taxes. Cape Province introduced the tax in 1913, Natal and Orange Free State in 1917, and Transvaal in 1931.

== Turkey ==
The Ottoman Empire introduced an entertainment tax in 1906.

== United Kingdom ==
The UK introduced an entertainment tax with the Finance (New Duties) Act 1916.
