= 2025 Haryana local elections =

Elections to Urban Local Bodies in Haryana in 2025

- 2–12 March 2025

36 municipalities in Haryana
- Turnout: 46.5%

	First party	Second party	Third party
Party	BJP	Independents	INC
Last election	8	0	2
Seats won	9	1	0
Seat change	▲1	▲1	▼2
Percentage	90	10	0
Mayors	9	1	0
Total Ulbs	20	16	0

The 2025 Haryana local elections were held in March 2025 to elect representatives to various urban local bodies in the Indian state of Haryana. The elections resulted in a landslide victory for the Bharatiya Janata Party (BJP), which won nine out of ten mayoral seats and won most chairman posts in municipal councils. Later the lone non-BJP winner joined the party. The Indian National Congress failed to win any mayor or chairman post.

== Background ==
Local body elections in Haryana are conducted by the Haryana State Election Commission to constitute Municipal Corporations, Municipal Councils, Municipal Committees and Panchayats under state laws.

Polling for most municipal corporations was held on 2 March 2025, while Panipat voted on 9 March. Counting of votes took place on 12 March 2025.

== Results ==
=== Municipal Corporations ===
The BJP secured victories in nine of the ten municipal corporations where mayoral elections were held. The Indian National Congress failed to win any mayoral seat.

Mayoral results in Municipal Corporations, 2025
Municipal Corporation	Winning candidate	Party
Gurugram	Raj Rani Malhotra	Bharatiya Janata Party
Faridabad	Praveen Joshi	Bharatiya Janata Party
Hisar	Parveen Popli	Bharatiya Janata Party
Rohtak	Ram Avtar Valmiki	Bharatiya Janata Party
Karnal	Renu Bala Gupta	Bharatiya Janata Party
Ambala	Shailja Sachdeva	Bharatiya Janata Party
Sonipat	Rajiv Jain	Bharatiya Janata Party
Yamunanagar	Suman Behmani	Bharatiya Janata Party
Panipat	Komal Saini	Bharatiya Janata Party
Manesar	Inderjeet Yadav	Independent

The only mayoral seat not won by the BJP was in Manesar, where Independent candidate Inderjeet Yadav defeated the BJP nominee by a margin of 2,293 votes. She later joined the BJP.

== Mayoral Vote Share by District ==
The following table shows reported vote counts and approximate vote shares for each municipal corporation mayoral election in Haryana, 2025.

2025 Haryana Mayoral Elections – Vote Counts & Share
Municipal Corporation	Winning Candidate	Party	Votes Won	Nearest Rival	Rival Party	Rival Votes	BJP/Independent Vote Share (%)
Gurugram	Raj Rani Malhotra	Bharatiya Janata Party	2,15,754	Seema Pahuja	Indian National Congress	65,764	BJP 76%, INC 23%
Faridabad	Praveen Joshi	Bharatiya Janata Party	4,16,927	Lata Rani	Indian National Congress	1,00,075	BJP 80%, INC 19%
Panipat	Komal Saini	Bharatiya Janata Party	1,62,075	Savita Sanjay Garg	Indian National Congress	38,905	BJP 79%, INC 19%
Hisar	Parveen Popli	Bharatiya Janata Party	96,396	Krishna Singla	Indian National Congress	31,873	BJP 75%, INC 25%
Rohtak	Ram Avtar Valmiki	Bharatiya Janata Party	1,02,269	Surajmal Kiloi	Indian National Congress	57,071	BJP 64%, INC 36%
Karnal	Renu Bala Gupta	Bharatiya Janata Party	83,630	Manoj Kumar	Indian National Congress	58,271	BJP 59%, INC 41%
Ambala	Shailja Sachdeva	Bharatiya Janata Party	91,305	Rajesh Khurana	Indian National Congress	45,218	BJP 67%, INC 33%
Sonipat	Rajiv Jain	Bharatiya Janata Party	85,412	Sunita Devi	Indian National Congress	39,784	BJP 68%, INC 32%
Yamunanagar	Suman Behmani	Bharatiya Janata Party	78,940	Anita Sharma	Indian National Congress	32,105	BJP 71%, INC 29%
Manesar	Inderjeet Yadav	Independent	27,380	Sunder Lal	Bharatiya Janata Party	25,087	Independent 52%, BJP 48%

- Vote shares are approximate, calculated from reported vote totals where available.*

=== Ambala Municipal Council ===
In the Ambala Sadar Municipal Council elections, the BJP won 25 of the 32 seats and secured the council president's post.

== Political significance ==
The results were widely viewed as reinforcing the BJP's dominance in Haryana's urban political landscape and as a huge setback for the Indian National Congress.

== Voter turnout ==
Media reports indicated moderate voter turnout across urban local bodies, with participation varying between districts.

== See also ==
- Politics of Haryana
- Elections in Haryana
- 2024 Haryana Legislative Assembly election
- 2025 Hisar Municipal Corporation election
