= Local government in Maharashtra =

Local government in Maharashtra State follows the general structure of Local Governance in India and is broadly classified into two categories: Urban Local Governance and Rural Local Governance.

== Urban Local Governance ==
Maharashtra is the third most urbanised state in India with 42.23% of its population living in urban areas, compared with the national average of 31.16%. The urban population grew by 23.7% in the 2001–2011 period to 50.8 million and now has the highest number of people living in urban areas. Maharashtra has 255 Statutory Towns and 279 Census Towns.

=== Municipal Acts ===
There are three municipal acts in effect in Maharashtra;

Name of Act	Area of Effect
Maharashtra Municipal Councils, Nagar Panchayats and Industrial Townships Act, 1965	All Municipal Councils, Nagar Panchayats, and Industrial Townships in Maharashtra
Maharashtra Municipal Corporations Act	All Municipal Corporations in Maharashtra, except Brihanmumbai Municipal Corporation
Mumbai Municipal Corporation Act, 1888	Brihanmumbai Municipal Corporation

Section 3 of Maharashtra Municipal Corporations Act, and Sections 3,4, and 341A of Maharashtra Municipal Councils, Nagar Panchayats and Industrial Townships Act, 1965 create the following categories of urban areas based on their population.

Types of Urban Areas according to the Municipal Acts in Maharashtra
Type		Population Criteria	Type of Local Body
Larger Urban Area		Population more than 300,000	Municipal Corporation
Smaller Urban Area	Type A	Population more than 100,000	Municipal Council
Smaller Urban Area	Type B	Population of more than 40,000 but not more than 100,000	Municipal Council
Smaller Urban Area	Type C	Population of 40,000 or less but more than 25,000	Municipal Council
Transitional Area		10,000 to 25,000	Nagar Panchayat

Further, depending on the population size, the Acts prescribes the minimum and maximum number of councillors/wards allowed within each type of local government.

Minimum and Maximum number of Councillors Allowed in Municipalities in Maharashtra
Population Range	Minimum	Incremental Number	Maximum
Municipal Corporations
Above 2.4 million	145	For every additional population of 100,000, one additional councillor	221
1.2 million – 2.4 million	115	For every additional population of 40,000 above 1.2 million, one additional councillor	145
600,000 – 1.2 million	85	For every additional population of 20,000 above 600,000, one additional councillor	115
300,000 – 600,000	65	For every additional population of 15,000 above 300,000, one additional councillor	85
Municipal Council
Class 'A' Municipal Council	38	For every 8,000 of the population above 100,000, there shall be one additional elected Councillor	65
Class 'B' Municipal Council	23	For every 5,000 of the population above 40,000 there shall be one additional elected Councillor	37
Class 'C' Municipal Council	17	For every 3,000 of the population above 25,000 there shall be one additional elected Councillor	23
Nagar Panchayat
Nagar Panchayat	126	-	126

=== Municipal Corporations ===
There are 29 Municipal Corporations in Maharashtra, as follows:

Rank	Name	City	District	Established	Grade	Population (2011)	Party Power
1	Brihanmumbai Municipal Corporation	Mumbai	Mumbai City District, Mumbai Suburban District	1888	A+	11,914,398	BJP
2	Pune Municipal Corporation	Pune	Pune	1950	A	3,115,431	BJP
3	Nagpur Municipal Corporation	Nagpur	Nagpur	1951	A	2,405,421	BJP
4	Thane Municipal Corporation	Thane	Thane	1982	B	1,818,872	Shiv Sena
5	Pimpri-Chinchwad Municipal Corporation	Pune	Pune	1982	A	1,729,359	BJP
6	Nashik Municipal Corporation	Nashik	Nashik	1982	A	1,486,973	BJP
7	Kalyan-Dombivli Municipal Corporation	Kalyan-Dombivli	Thane	1982	C	1,246,381	Shiv Sena
8	Vasai-Virar City Municipal Corporation	Vasai-Virar	Palghar	2009	C	1,221,233	BJP
9	Aurangabad Municipal Corporation	Aurangabad	Aurangabad	1982	C	1,171,330	BJP
10	Navi Mumbai Municipal Corporation	Navi Mumbai	Thane	1992	C	1,119,477	BJP
11	Solapur Municipal Corporation	Solapur	Solapur	1964	D	951,118	BJP
12	Mira-Bhayandar Municipal Corporation	Mira-Bhayandar	Thane	2002	D	814,655	BJP
13	Bhiwandi-Nizampur City Municipal Corporation	Bhiwandi-Nizampur	Thane	2002	D	711,329	BJP
14	Amravati Municipal Corporation	Amravati	Amravati	1983	D	646,801	BJP
15	Nanded-Waghala City Municipal Corporation	Nanded	Nanded	1997	D	550,564	BJP
16	Kolhapur Municipal Corporation	Kolhapur	Kolhapur	1972	D	549,283	BJP
17	Akola Municipal Corporation	Akola	Akola	2001	D	603,000	BJP
18	Panvel Municipal Corporation	Panvel	Raigad	2016	D	509,901	BJP
19	Ulhasnagar Municipal Corporation	Ulhasnagar	Thane	1998	D	506,937	Shiv Sena
20	Sangli, Miraj and Kupwad City Municipal Corporation	Sangli-Miraj & Kupwad	Sangli	1998	D	502,697	BJP
21	Malegaon Municipal Corporation	Malegaon	Nashik	2003	D	471,006	ISLM
22	Jalgaon City Municipal Corporation	Jalgaon	Jalgaon	2003	D	460,468	BJP
23	Latur City Municipal Corporation	Latur	Latur	2011	D	382,754	INC
24	Dhule Municipal Corporation	Dhule	Dhule	2003	D	376,093	BJP
25	Ahmednagar Municipal Corporation	Ahmednagar	Ahmednagar	2003	D	350,905	BJP
26	Chandrapur City Municipal Corporation	Chandrapur	Chandrapur	2011	D	321,036	BJP
27	Parbhani City Municipal Corporation	Parbhani	Parbhani	2011	D	307,191	SS (Shinde)
28	Ichalkaranji Municipal Corporation	Ichalkaranji	Kolhapur	2022	D	377730	BJP
29	Jalna City Municipal Corporation	Jalna	Jalna	2023	D		BJP

=== Municipal councils ===
There are 226 municipalities in Maharashtra. Some Municipal Councils are:

Name	City	District	Established	Contact No	Population (2011)	Party in Power
Vadgaon Municipal Council	Peth Vadgaon	Kolhapur	1887	C	37200	
Jawhar Municipal Council	Jawhar	Palghar	1918	B	50000	
Sailu Municipal Council	Sailu	Parbhani	1951	B	46,915	
Gondia Municipal Council	Gondia	Gondia District		A		BJP
Tirora Municipal Council	Tirora	Gondia District	1957	C	27,515	BJP & INC
Katol Municipal Council	Katol	Nagpur District		A		NCP
Chikhli Municipal Council	Chikhli	Buldhana District		B		BJP
Kopargaon Municipal Council	Kopargaon	Ahmednagar District		B		BJP
Rahata Municipal Council	Rahata	Ahmednagar District	1987			BJP
Karjat Municipal Council	Karjat	Raigad district	1992	C	29,663	Shivsena

=== Ward Committees ===
Section 66A of Maharashtra Municipal Councils, Nagar Panchayats and Industrial Townships Act, 1965 mandates the setting up of wards committees in municipal areas with a population more than 300,000. Thus, Nagar Panchayats, and Type B and C Municipal Councils are automatically relieved of setting up Wards Committees, as well as Type A Municipal Councils with population less than 300,000. More than one ward may constitute one Wards Committee and it is left to the discretion of the municipal body to decide upon the number of such wards.

Section 29A of the Maharashtra Municipal Corporations Act mandates the setting up of wards committees in areas with Municipal Corporations. It gives more details about the number of wards committees to be formed according to population size:

Number of Wards Committees allowed according to Maharashtra Municipal Corporations Act
Population	Minimum Number of Ward Committees	Additional Wards Committees for Additional Population	Maximum Number of Ward Committees
Above 2.4 million	13	600,000	25
1.2 million – 2.4 million	9	300,000	13
450,000 – 1.2 million	4	150,000	9
300,000 – 450,000	3	-	4

While bigger cities like Mumbai and Pune have formed Wards Committees which are active, smaller cities are yet to have active wards committees.

== Rural Local Governance ==
Rural governance in India is based on the Panchayati Raj system. It is a three tier system, with the Zilla Parishad at the district level, Taluka panchayat at the Taluka or sub-district level and Grampanchayat (Village Council) at the lowest level. Maharashtra was one of the first states to implement the three tier system under the Maharashtra Zilla Parishads and Panchayat Samitis Acts 1961 of Maharashtra State. That act was amended with Act XXI to bring it in line with 73rd amendment to the Indian constitution in 1994.

=== Zilla parishad ===
Zilla Parishad (commonly known as ZP) is a local government body at the district level in India. It looks after the administration of the rural area of the district and its office is located at the district headquarters. Each Zilla Parishad (ZP) is headed by an elected president and Vice President, while its administrative head is the chief executive officer (CEO) appointed by the state government.

There are 34 Zilla Parishads in Maharashtra which are as follows.

1. Thane Zilla Parishad
2. Palghar Zilla Parishad
3. Raigad District Council
4. Ratnagiri Zilla Parishad
5. Sindhudurg Zilla Parishad
6. Nashik Zilla Parishad
7. Dhule Zilla Parishad
8. Nandurbar Zilla Parishad
9. Jalgaon District Council
10. Ahmednagar Zilla Parishad
11. Pune Zilla Parishad
12. Satara Zilla Parishad
13. Sangli Zilla Parishad
14. Solapur Zilla Parishad
15. Kolhapur Zilla Parishad
16. Aurangabad Zilla Parishad
17. Jalna Zilla Parishad
18. Parbhani Zilla Parishad
19. Hingoli Zilla Parishad
20. Beed Zilla Parishad
21. Nanded Zilla Parishad
22. Osmanabad Zilla Parishad
23. Latur Zilla Parishad
24. Amravati Zilla Parishad
25. Akola Zilla Parishad
26. Washim Zilla Parishad
27. Buldhana Zilla Parishad
28. Yavatmal Zilla Parishad
29. Nagpur Zilla Parishad
30. Wardha Zilla Parishad
31. Bhandara District Council
32. Gondia Zilla Parishad
33. Chandrapur Zilla Parishad
34. Gadchiroli Zilla Parishad

=== Panchayat samiti ===
Panchayat samiti is a local government body at the Taluka (sub-district)( level in India. It works for the villages that together are called a Block. The Panchayat Samiti is the link between the Gram Panchayat and Zilla Parishad.

There are 351 panchayat samitis or block panchayats in Maharashtra.

=== Gram panchayat ===
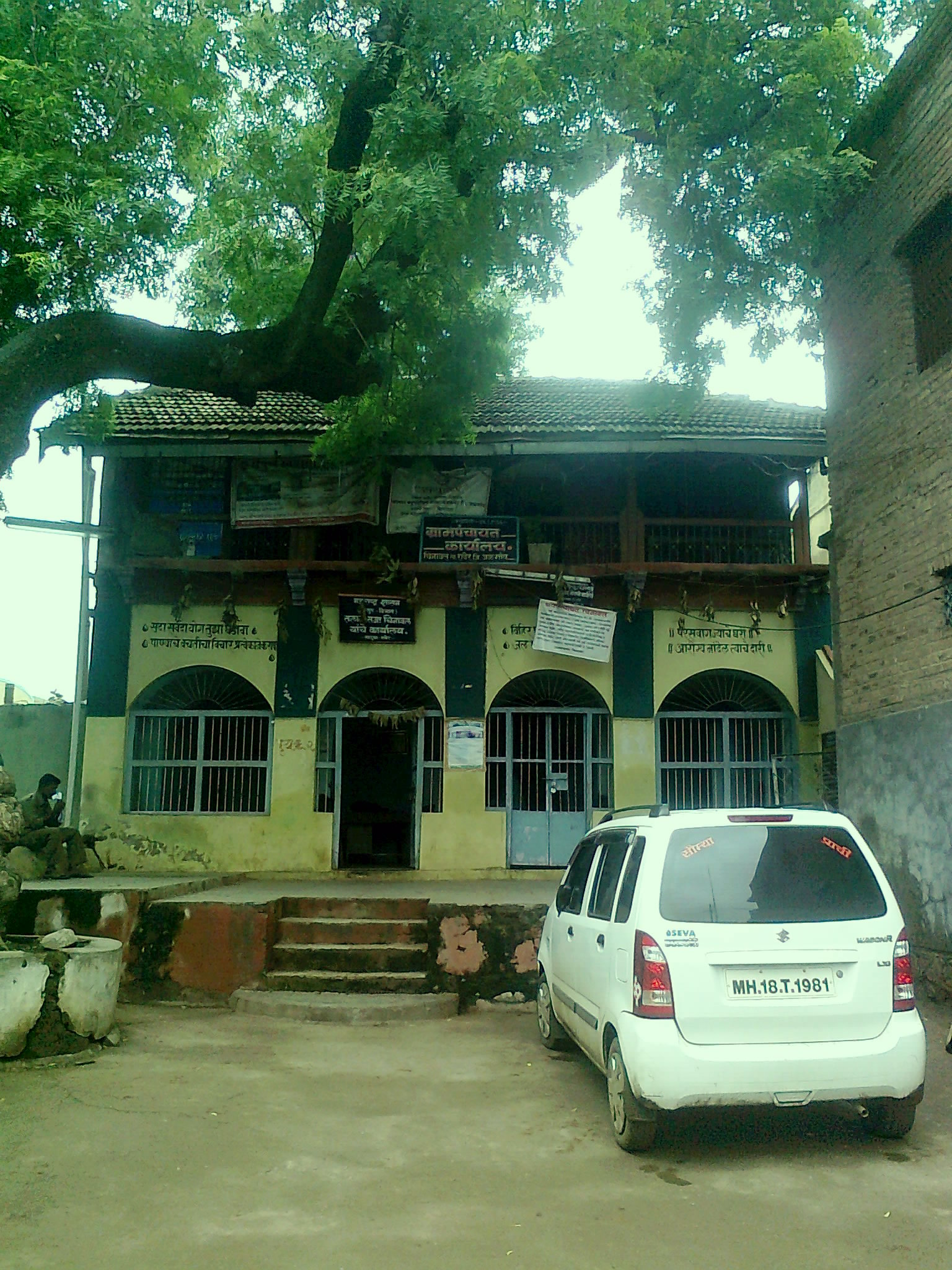
Gram panchayat office at Chinawal village in Maharashtra

Gram panchayats are local self-government bodies at the village level. They are a cornerstone of the panchayati raj system. A gram panchayat can be set up in villages with a population of more than five hundred. There is a common gram panchayat for two or more villages if the population of these villages is less than five hundred, whereupon it is called a group-gram panchayat. The panchayat members are elected by the voters in the village but seats are reserved for different categories. 33% of the seats are reserved for women. The scheduled castes (SC), scheduled tribes(ST), and other backward classes (OBC) get seats allocated in proportion to their population in the village. The office holder positions (sarpanch and the deputy sarpanch positions) are rotated between different demographics such as women, SC, ST., general category etc.

There are 28,813 gram panchayats in Maharashtra.

== Elections ==
All elected officials in local bodies serve for five years. Elections are for the positions are conducted by the Maharashtra State Election Commission

== See also ==
- Local Governance in Kerala
- Decentralisation and Local Governance in Kerala
