= 2025–26 Maharashtra local elections =

Indian local elections

2025–26 Maharashtra Local Body election
- 2 Dec 2025 - 15 Jan 2026

29 Municipal Corporations 246 Municipal Councils and 42 Nagar Panchayats
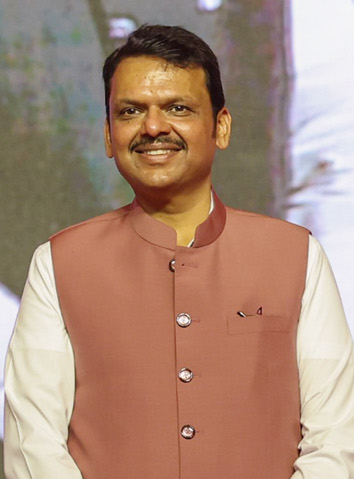

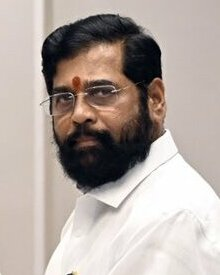

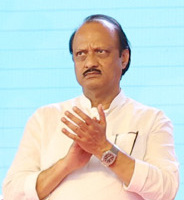

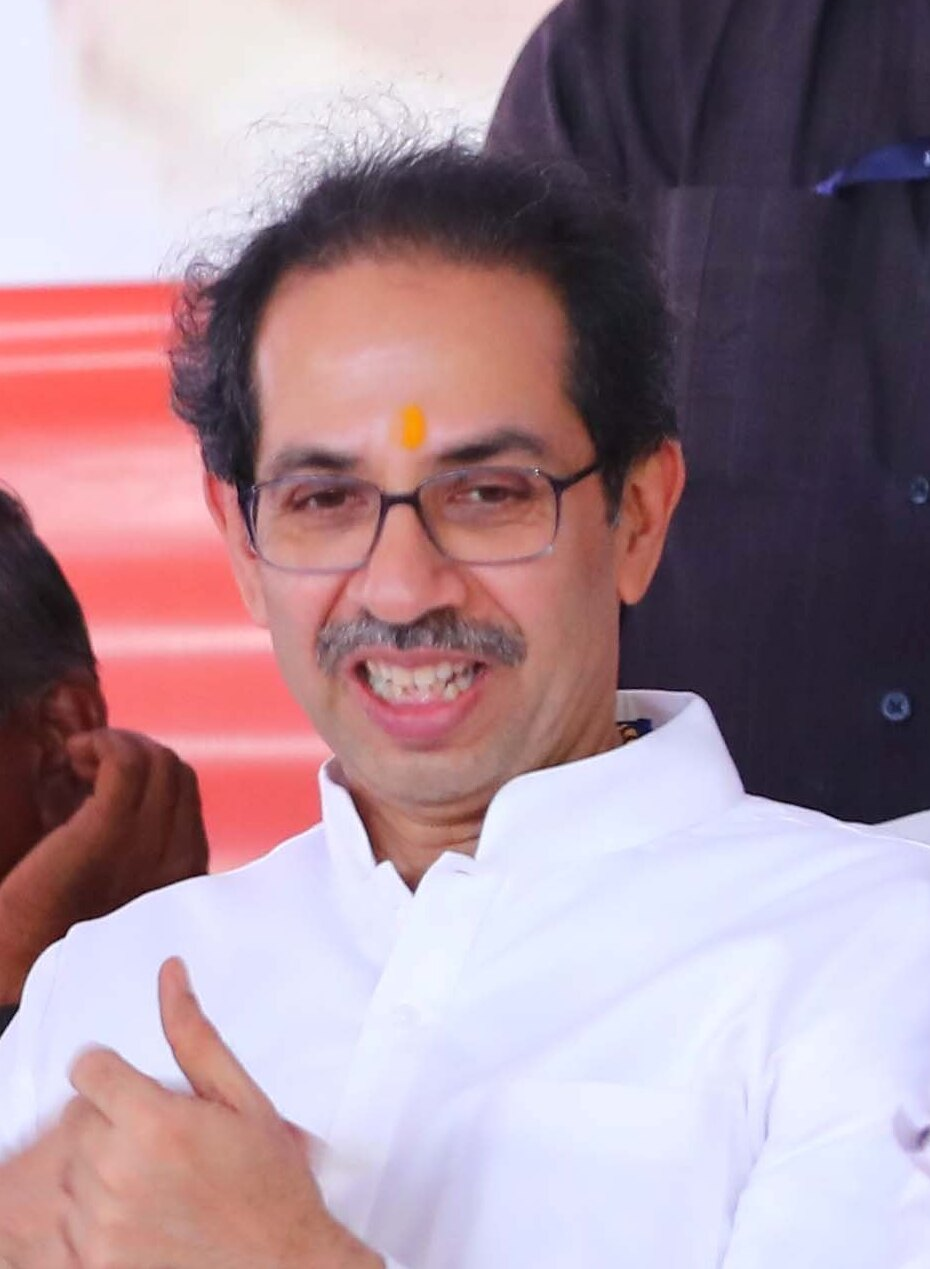
	Majority party	Minority party	Third party
Leader	Devendra Fadnavis	Eknath Shinde	Harshwardhan Sapkal
Party	BJP	SS	INC
Alliance	MY	MY
Seats won	4,507	1,358	1,176
	Fourth party	Fifth party	Sixth party
			NCP (SP)
Leader	Ajit Pawar	Uddhav Thackeray	Sharad Pawar
Party	NCP	SS(UBT)	NCP-SP
Alliance	MY
Seats won	927	576	330

Local elections were held in Maharashtra in multiple phases, for the 246 municipal councils and 46 Nagar Panchayat, results announced on 21 Dec 2025 day after each round of voting. The first phase took place on December 2, and 29 Municipal Corporations voted on 15 January 2026. The Bharatiya Janata Party led Maha Yuti alliance won a landslide victory in these elections with the BJP itself securing 3091 seats of the 6859 seats in the ward members of the municipal council and nagar panchayats. BJP also won 117 of the 288 municipal councils and nagar panchayat chairpersons post on its own. Additionally BJP did well in the municipal corporation election as it won most mayor positions along with 1441 of the 2869 ward members post, more than 50% of the seats. Its allies Shiv Sena (Shinde) and Nationalist Congress Party also performed well with Shiv Sena bagging 53 chairperson and NCP winning 37. SS (Shinde) won in 961 wards in municipal councils and nagar panchayats and NCP won in 760 wards in municipal council and nagar panchayat. The election was therefore, a dominant performance of the ruling Maha Yuti alliance.

== Background ==
Across 246 Municipal Councils and 42 Municipal Panchayats, the total number of members was 5739. Overall the election was a dominant performance for the ruling Maha Yuti alliance.

== Schedule ==
=== Municipal Corporation Election ===
Poll Event	Schedule
Notification	15 December 2025
Last Date for filing nomination	30 December 2025
Scrutiny of Nominations	31 December 2025
Withdrawal of Candidature	2 January 2026
Date of Poll	15 January 2026
Date of Counting	16 January 2026

== Result ==
=== Party wise results ===
Party	Municipal corporations		Municipal councils/ Nagar Panchayats	
Party	Mayor	Member	Chairperson	Member
BJP	20	1416	117	3091
SS	3	397	53	961
NCP	1	160	37	760
INC	1	324	28	852
SS(UBT)	1	153	9	423
NCP(SP)	0	36	7	294
Others	3		37	477
Total	29	2869	288	6859

=== Municipal Corporations ===
Corporation	Party won	Seats composition
Brihanmumbai Municipal Corporation; Total seats (227)	Bharatiya Janata Party	BJP (89); SS(UBT) (65); SHS (29); INC (24); AIMIM (8); MNS (6); NCP (3); SP (2); NCP-SP (1)
Thane Municipal Corporation; Total seats (131)	Shiv Sena	SHS (75); BJP (28); NCP-SP (12); NCP (9); AIMIM (5); SS(UBT) (1); Independent (1)
Ulhasnagar Municipal Corporation; Total seats (78)	Bharatiya Janata Party	BJP (37); SHS (36); VBA (2); INC (1); SAI (1); Independent (1)
Kalyan-Dombivli Municipal Corporation; Total seats (122)	Shiv Sena	SHS (53); BJP (50); SS(UBT) (11); MNS (5); INC (2); NCP-SP (1)
Aurangabad Municipal Corporation; Total seats (115)	Bharatiya Janata Party	BJP (58); AIMIM (33); SHS (12); SS(UBT) (6); INC (1); NCP-SP (1); Independent (4)
Jalgaon City Municipal Corporation; Total seats (75)	Bharatiya Janata Party	BJP (46); SHS (22); SS(UBT) (5); NCP (1); Independent (1)
Ahmednagar Municipal Corporation; Total seats (68)	Nationalist Congress Party	NCP (27); BJP (25); SHS (10); INC (2); AIMIM (2); SS(UBT) (1); Independent (1)
Kolhapur Municipal Corporation; Total seats (81)	Bharatiya Janata Party	INC (34); BJP (26); SHS (15); NCP (4); SS(UBT) (1); Independent (1)
Bhiwandi-Nizampur City Municipal Corporation; Total seats (90)	Independent politician (Note: BJP rebel)	INC (30); BJP (22); SHS (12); NCP-SP (12); SP (6); KVA (4); BVA(EM) (3); IND (1)
Nanded-Waghala City Municipal Corporation; Total seats (81)	Bharatiya Janata Party	BJP (45); AIMIM (14); INC (10); VBA (5); SS (4); NCP (2); IND (1)
Malegaon Municipal Corporation; Total seats (84)	Indian Secular Largest Assembly of Maharashtra	ISLAM (35); AIMIM (21); SHS (18); SP (5); INC (3); BJP (2)
Latur City Municipal Corporation; Total seats (70)	Indian National Congress	INC (43); VBA (4); BJP (22); NCP (1)
Parbhani City Municipal Corporation; Total seats (65)	Shiv Sena	SS(UBT) (25); INC (12); BJP (12); NCP (11); JSS (3); YS (1); IND (1)
Navi Mumbai Municipal Corporation; Total seats (111)	Bharatiya Janata Party	BJP (65); SHS (42); SS(UBT) (2); MNS (1); IND (1)
Vasai-Virar City Municipal Corporation; Total seats (115)	Bahujan Vikas Aghadi	BVA (70); BJP (43); SHS (1); INC (1)
Pune Municipal Corporation; Total seats (165)	Bharatiya Janata Party	BJP (119); NCP (27); INC (15); NCP-SP (3); SS(UBT) (1)
Nagpur Municipal Corporation; Total seats (151)	Bharatiya Janata Party	BJP (102); INC (34); AIMIM (6); IUML (4); SS(UBT) (2); SHS (1); NCP (1); BSP (1)
Pimpri-Chinchwad Municipal Corporation; Total seats (128)	Bharatiya Janata Party	BJP (84); NCP (37); SHS (6); Independent (1)
Nashik Municipal Corporation; Total seats (122)	Bharatiya Janata Party	BJP (72); SHS (26); SS(UBT) (15); NCP (4); INC (3); MNS (1); Independent (1)
Solapur Municipal Corporation; Total seats (102)	Bharatiya Janata Party	BJP (87); AIMIM (8); SHS (4); INC (2); NCP (1)
Amravati Municipal Corporation; Total seats (87)	Bharatiya Janata Party	BJP (25); RYSP (15); NCP (11); SHS (3); INC (15); SS(UBT) (2); AIMIM (12); BSP (3); VBA (1)
Akola Municipal Corporation; Total seats (80)	Bharatiya Janata Party	BJP (38); SHS (1); NCP (1); INC (21); SS(UBT) (6); VBA (5); NCP-SP (3); AIMIM (3); Akola Vikas Samiti (1); IND (1)
Mira-Bhayandar Municipal Corporation; Total seats (96)	Bharatiya Janata Party	BJP (78); SHS (3); INC (13); OTH (2)
Panvel Municipal Corporation; Total seats (78)	Bharatiya Janata Party	BJP (46); SHS (5); NCP (1); PWPI (15); NCP-SP (4); SS(UBT) (3); INC (3); IND (1)
Chandrapur City Municipal Corporation; Total seats (66)	Bharatiya Janata Party	INC (27); BJP (23); SS(UBT) (6); JVS (3); VBA (2); SHS (1); AIMIM (1); BSP (1); IND (2)
Sangli-Miraj-Kupwad Municipal Corporation; Total seats (78)	Bharatiya Janata Party	BJP (39); NCP (16); SHS (2); INC (18); NCP-SP (3)
Dhule Municipal Corporation; Total seats (74)	Bharatiya Janata Party	BJP (50); NCP (8); SHS (5); AIMIM (10); OTH (1)
Ichalkaranji Municipal Corporation; Total seats (76)	Bharatiya Janata Party	BJP (43); SHS (3); NCP (1); SS(UBT) (1); Independent (17)
Jalna City Municipal Corporation; Total seats (65)	Bharatiya Janata Party	BJP (41); SHS (12); INC (9); AIMIM (2); Independent (1)
