= Malegaon Central Assembly constituency =

Constituency of the Maharashtra legislative assembly in India

Coordinates: 20.560°N 74.524°E

Malegaon Central
- Constituency No. 114 for the Maharashtra Legislative Assembly

Constituency details
- Country: India
- Region: Western India
- State: Maharashtra
- Division: Nashik
- District: Nashik
- Lok Sabha constituency: Dhule
- Established: 1978
- Total electors: 342,786
- Reservation: None

Member of Legislative Assembly
- 15th Maharashtra Legislative Assembly
- Incumbent Mohammed Ismail Abdul Khalique
- Party: AIMIM
- Alliance: None
- Elected year: 2024

Malegaon Central Assembly constituency is one of the 288 Vidhan Sabha (legislative assembly) constituencies in Maharashtra state in western India.

It is part of Dhule Lok Sabha constituency.

== Members of the Legislative Assembly ==
Year	Member	Party
1962	Haroon Ahmed Ansari	Indian National Congress
1967	Nihal Ahmed Maulavi Mohammed Usman	Praja Socialist Party
1972	Asisha Chiragh Hakim	Indian National Congress
1978	Nihal Ahmed Maulavi Mohammed Usman	Janata Party
1980	Nihal Ahmed Maulavi Mohammed Usman	Janata Party
1985	Nihal Ahmed Maulavi Mohammed Usman	Janata Party
1990	Nihal Ahmed Maulavi Mohammed Usman	Janata Dal
1995	Nihal Ahmed Maulavi Mohammed Usman	Janata Dal
1999	Shaikh Rasheed Haji Shaikh Shafi	Indian National Congress
2004	Shaikh Rasheed Haji Shaikh Shafi	Indian National Congress
Before 2009 : See Malegaon
2009	Ismail Abdul Khalique	Jan Surajya Shakti
2014	Shaikh Aasif Shaikh Rashid	Indian National Congress
2019	Ismail Abdul Khalique	All India Majlis-e-Ittehadul Muslimeen
2024	Ismail Abdul Khalique	All India Majlis-e-Ittehadul Muslimeen

== Election results ==
=== Assembly Election 2024 ===
2024 Maharashtra Legislative Assembly election : Malegaon Central
Party	Candidate	Votes	%	±%
AIMIM	Mohammed Ismail Abdul Khalique	109,653	45.87	▼12.99
ISLAM	Shaikh Aasif Shaikh Rashid	109,491	45.80	New
SP	Shan-E-Hind Nihal Ahmed	9,624	4.03	New
INC	Ajaz Aziz Baig	7,527	3.15	▼36.37
NOTA	None of the Above	1,102	0.46	▼0.11
Margin of victory		162	0.07	▼19.27
Turnout		240,164	70.06	▲2.61
Total valid votes		239,062		
Registered electors		342,786		▲15.51
AIMIM hold		Swing	▼12.99	

=== Assembly Election 2019 ===
2019 Maharashtra Legislative Assembly election : Malegaon Central
Party	Candidate	Votes	%	±%
AIMIM	Mohammed Ismail Abdul Khalique	117,242	58.86	▲46.19
INC	Shaikh Aasif Shaikh Rashid	78,723	39.52	▼5.82
BJP	Dipali Vivek Warule	1,450	0.73	New
NOTA	None of the Above	1,143	0.57	▼0.18
Margin of victory		38,519	19.34	▲9.62
Turnout		200,641	67.61	▼0.33
Total valid votes		199,201		
Registered electors		296,749		▲20.48
AIMIM gain from INC		Swing	▲13.52	

=== Assembly Election 2014 ===
2014 Maharashtra Legislative Assembly election : Malegaon Central
Party	Candidate	Votes	%	±%
INC	Shaikh Aasif Shaikh Rashid	75,326	45.34	▲10.14
NCP	Mohammed Ismail Abdul Khalique	59,175	35.62	New
AIMIM	Abdul Malik Fareed	21,050	12.67	New
JD(S)	Buland Iqbal Nihal Ahmed	6,721	4.05	▼11.32
SS	Sajid Akhtar Ajazuddin	1,375	0.83	New
NOTA	None of the Above	1,259	0.76	New
Margin of victory		16,151	9.72	▼2.13
Turnout		167,416	67.97	▲4.72
Total valid votes		166,150		
Registered electors		246,308		▲2.15
INC gain from JSS		Swing	▼1.70	

=== Assembly Election 2009 ===
2009 Maharashtra Legislative Assembly election : Malegaon Central
Party	Candidate	Votes	%	±%
JSS	Mohammed Ismail Abdul Khalique	71,157	47.04	New
INC	Shaikh Rasheed Haji Shaikh Shafi	53,238	35.19	New
JD(S)	Nihal Ahmad Maulwi Mohmad Usman	23,237	15.36	New
Independent	Mo. Ismail Jumman	1,034	0.68	New
Margin of victory		17,919	11.85	
Turnout		151,280	62.74	
Total valid votes		151,269		
Registered electors		241,115		
JSS win (new seat)				

== See also ==
1. Malegaon Outer Assembly constituency
2. Dhule (Lok Sabha constituency)
3. Malegaon (Lok Sabha constituency)
4. List of constituencies of Maharashtra Vidhan Sabha
5. Legislative Assembly of Maharashtra
6. List of constituencies of the Lok Sabha
7. Malegaon
