= Harshawardhan Nikose =

Indian politician

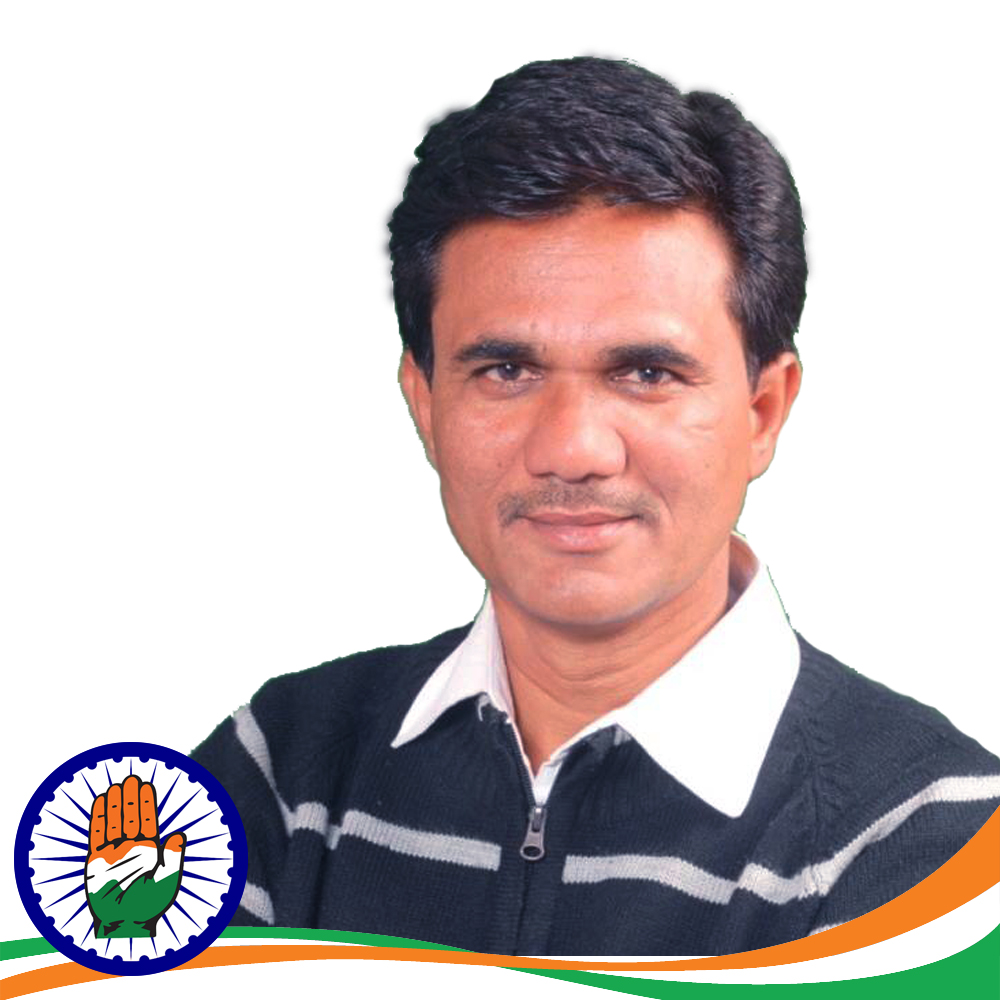

President Nagpur Rural Congress (Schedule Caste Department)
- In office 2015- 2019

State Convener Rajiv Gandhi Panchayat Raj Sangathan
- In office 2016- 2018

Chairman, Social Welfare Zila Parishad Nagpur
- In office 2007-2010

Personal details
- Born: 16 April 1970 (age 56)
- Party: Indian National Congress
- As of 5 November, 2017

Harshawardhan Liladhar Nikose (born 16 April 1970 in Nagpur, Maharashtra) is an Indian politician member of Indian National Congress party and active mainly in Nagpur, Maharashtra region. He is state convener of Rajiv Gandhi Panchayat Raj Sanghatan and President of Indian national Congress Party, Nagpur district (Schedule Caste Department). having held previous offices of Chairman of Social Welfare committee, Zilla Parishad Nagpur (2007–10) and Sarpanch of Dorli village (2001-2005) in Parseoni Taluka of Nagpur District. Harshawardhan Nikose has appointed president of Vidarbha region, Rajiv Gandhi Panchayati Raj Sangathan in December 2018. New opportunity by All India Congress committee scheduled caste Dept as a Parliament co-ordinator of ramtek- 09 Parliament election 2019 under leadership development missions in reserve constituency.

== Early life ==
He was born in a Dorli village (1970) of Nagpur District area of Maharashtra to Liladhar S. Nikose and Suman L Nikose. He did his B.A graduation from Hislop College, then Bachelor of mass communication at lokmanya Tilak institute of Management Nagpur. Also learn Panchayati Raj administration, political science from Nagpur University. Autonomous College – of Nagpur University . He is married to Anita H Nikose, and has two daughters.

== Political career ==
Harshawardhan Nikose started his political career as Youth congress member in 1994 then he became President of Taluka Youth Congress and also elected Sarpanch of Gat Gram Panchayat Dorli. he was sarpanch of his native village Dorli for 5 years and then Panchayat Member for 5 years. during his early political days he worked at Nagpur Rural Youth Congress and Ranjeet Deshmukh. In 2007 he was elected Zilla parishad member from Parseoni Circle and headed as Chairman of Social Welfare committee, Zilla Parishad Nagpur (2007–10). in 2012 he lost Zilla Parishad Election to BJP candidate by small margin. Now currently he is working as Maharashtra State convener of Rajiv Gandhi Panchayat Sangathan. He is Also president of Nagpur Rural Congress Party as Schedule Caste department President. 2014 worked in Rajasthan specially Kota, Baran and Zalawar dist. For zila Panchayat election. 2016 party In charge of kuhi Panchayat elevation and election won by majority.
