= None of the above (India) =

Ballot option to not vote for any candidate

Symbol used with NOTA option on ballot papers and electronic voting machines in India

Since 2013, None of the Above, abbreviated as NOTA, has been included as a choice on ballot papers in most Indian elections. By expressing a preference for none of the candidates on the ballot, a voter can choose not to endorse any candidate in the elections.

As a result of the 2013 judgement PUCL vs. Union of India, the Supreme Court of India directed the Election Commission of India to include NOTA in elections to the Lok Sabha and state legislative assemblies. The NOTA option was first used in the 2013 elections in four states (Chhattisgarh, Mizoram, Rajasthan, and Madhya Pradesh) and the union territory of Delhi.

Since its introduction, NOTA has gained popularity amongst voters, securing more votes than some candidates in legislative assembly elections, and in some instances, securing more votes than the winning candidate in panchayat elections.

== Supreme Court Judgement on NOTA ==
A writ petition was filed by People's Union for Civil Liberties (PUCL). The Supreme Court of India judgement said,

We direct the Election Commission to provide necessary provision in the ballot papers/EVMs and another button called "None of the Above" (NOTA) may be provided in EVMs so that the voters, who come to the polling booth and decide not to vote for any of the candidates in the fray, are able to exercise their right not to vote while maintaining their right of secrecy.

The Supreme Court also observed that it is essential that people of high moral and ethical values are chosen as people's representatives for proper governance of the country, and NOTA button can compel political parties to nominate a sound candidate.

== Election Commission of India (ECI) and NOTA ==
1. ECI has stated that "...even if, in any extreme case, the number of votes against NOTA is more than the number of votes secured by the candidates, the candidate who secures the largest number of votes among the contesting candidates shall be declared to be elected..."
2. In a clarification released in 2013, ECI has stated that votes polled for NOTA cannot be considered for determining the forfeiture of security deposit.
3. In 2014, ECI introduced NOTA in Rajya Sabha elections. (The Supreme Court in 2018, has scrapped ‘None Of The Above’ (NOTA) option in Rajya Sabha elections)
4. In 2015, Election Commission of India announced the symbol for 'None of the Above' option, with the design being done by National Institute of Design (NID), Ahmedabad. Earlier, there were demands that Election Commission allot the symbol of a donkey for NOTA.

== Performance ==
In many elections, NOTA has won more votes than many of the political parties that contested.

The highest NOTA record is Indore Lok Sabha constituency in 2024 elections saw more than 200,000 votes polled for NOTA. The candidate has won in Indore by a margin of 1.009 million, receiving 1,226,751 votes. His nearest competitor was NOTA, with 218,674 votes (16.28 percent), which was reportedly due to withdrawal of opposition at the last moment.

The previous NOTA record-holder was Gopalganj, Bihar, in 2019, when 51,660 voters, or 5 percent, chose this option. In the 2014 Lok Sabha elections, NOTA garnered 46,559 votes in Nilgiris in Tamil Nadu by pocketing nearly 5 percent of votes cast there.

In many constituencies, votes received by NOTA have been higher than the margin by which the candidate has won. Observations have been made that NOTA can influence more citizens to participate in voting, though there is a danger that the novelty factor associated with NOTA will gradually erode.

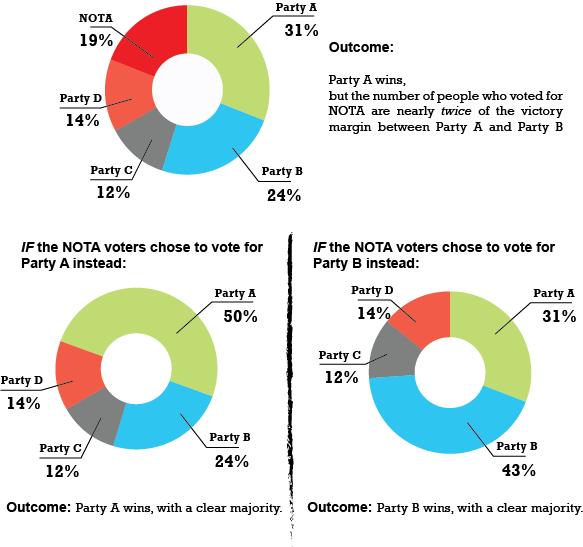
A pie chart depicting the scenario where (top) the number of votes polled for the None of the Above (NOTA) option are greater than the Victory Margin in an election where NOTA has no electoral value versus (bottom) two scenarios where the NOTA voters would have chosen one of the winning parties, leading to two different outcomes.

However, it seems that the popularity of NOTA is growing with time. NOTA has not managed to secure a majority, but in many of the elections since its introduction - including the 2014 Lok Sabha Elections as well as several Assembly Elections - the number of NOTA votes polled has been higher than the victory margin in many constituencies.

In the 2017 Gujarat Assembly Elections, the total vote share of NOTA was lesser only than the Bharatiya Janata Party (BJP), Congress, and Independent Candidates. In 118 constituencies, NOTA polled the third largest vote share after BJP and Congress.

In the 2018 Karnataka Assembly Elections, NOTA polled more votes than some parties with a nation-wide presence such as CPI (M) and BSP. In the Madhya Pradesh Assembly Elections conducted in 2018, the difference between the vote share of the BJP and Congress was just 0.1%, whereas NOTA polled a vote share of 1.4%. In the South Gwalior Constituency, the sitting MLA Narayan Singh Kushwah lost by 121 votes, whereas NOTA got 1550 votes. Had all the NOTA voters hypothetically voted for Kushwah, he would have won by a huge margin.

In the 2014 Lok Sabha Elections, 2G scam accused MP - A Raja (DMK candidate) - lost to the AIADMK candidate, while NOTA emerged with the third largest vote share, possibly as an expression of public anger towards corrupt candidates.

In the 2019 Indian general election, about 1.04 percent of the voters chose to vote for NOTA, with Bihar and Assam leading with 2.08 percent NOTA voters.

== Responses ==
NOTA has been described as the maturing of India's democracy. The power of NOTA to express dissent is clearly visible in reports where entire communities decided to democratically protest against governments that have failed to meet their needs. For instance, there have been multiple cases of entire villages deciding to vote for NOTA due to consistent failure of local governments to meet basic requirements like roads, electricity, inaction towards villagers' complaints about water contamination by industries, and even reports of sex workers who have been pushing for legalisation of their profession to get themselves covered under labour laws, but have received no government attention, deciding to go for NOTA.

What is unclear is whether so far this protest has translated into compensatory action by the elected Government. However, while passing the NOTA ruling, the Chief Justice of India, P. Sathasivam, was quoted as stating,

Giving right to a voter not to vote for any candidate while protecting his right of secrecy is extremely important in a democracy. Such an option gives the voter the right to express his disapproval of the kind of candidates being put up by the parties. Gradually, there will be a systemic change and the parties will be forced to accept the will of the people and field candidates who are known for their integrity.”.

A number of groups and individuals have been conducting voter awareness campaigns about NOTA. Recent year election results have shown an increasing trend of people choosing NOTA.

It has been observed that some of the highest NOTA votes polled are consistently seen in Reserved Constituencies (Constituencies that, based on their demographic composition, are required to field only candidates from Reserved Categories to contest elections). This could be interpreted as a refusal of general category voters to vote for an SC/ST candidate - a scenario where NOTA is being misused to uphold caste-based bias.

While on the one hand, more votes for NOTA could be interpreted as more expression of the prevailing dissatisfaction in the electorate, there is also the danger that the underlying cause is ignorance about the candidates, uninformed and irresponsible voting, or expression of bias on the basis of caste, as seen in the case of Reserved Constituencies. Thus, while NOTA is definitely providing a voice to dissent, it needs to be accompanied with efforts to raise voter awareness to prevent the misuse of this measure.

In 2018, Maharashtra State Election Commission (MSEC) said that if NOTA received the maximum votes in an assembly constituency, then none of the contesting candidates will be declared elected and fresh elections will be held. In 2021, Supreme Court asked Election Commission if it is legally permissible to reject all candidates in an election where NOTA votes win the highest number of votes. In 2022, Delhi State Election Commission announced that if NOTA gained the highest vote, then the results will not be immediately declared but report will be sent to State Election Commission. Then the State Election Commission will declare new elections on the concerning seats.

== Suggested improvements ==
There have been discussions to improve on NOTA, and to empower the voter through NOTA. Some of those suggested improvements include:

1. If NOTA receives the highest number of votes, re-election should be held in that constituency with new candidate or, that constituency should be ruled by the Governor.
2. When conducting re-elections, the NOTA button may be disabled to avoid a series of re-elections.
3. Political parties that lose to NOTA to bear the cost of re-election.
4. The candidates who lose to NOTA should not be allowed to contest elections for a defined period of time.
5. Candidates receiving votes less than NOTA to be disqualified to contest any election in future, even in constituencies where NOTA might not have got maximum votes.
6. To make NOTA a virtual representative of the constituency, if the votes polled for NOTA is the majority vote.
7. To conduct re-election, if the votes polled for NOTA is higher than the winning margin of votes.

There have been PILs filed to strengthen the impact of NOTA in 2016 and 2017 by providing it the Power to Reject (asking for re-elections) if NOTA wins majority and barring the rejected candidates from contesting. However, the Supreme Court responded to these PILs by stating that such a solution is unworkable and that "holding an election in our country is a very serious and expensive business".

But voicing another line of opinion, Sanjay Parikh, a Supreme Court advocate who argued for PUCL in favour of NOTA, had stated in a 2013 interview:

Some people argue that the implementation of NOTA will drive up election expenses. But a tainted candidate who indulges in corruption and malpractices is a greater cost for the country. It is only the desire to continue in power and the greed for money that take prominence over values.

== NOTA in local elections ==
Section 79 (d) of the Representation of the People Act, 1951, recognises "electoral right" to also include the right to "refrain from voting at an election". 'The Representation of People Act' is applicable to "...either House of Parliament or in the House or either House of the Legislature of a State..." It is not applicable to elections for panchayats and urban local bodies. However, several states has implemented it by amending their Acts. NOTA was not included in the 2015 Kerala panchayat elections.

In 2018, the State Election Commission (SEC) of Maharashtra studied local body elections over the previous two years, and found several cases where NOTA had won more votes than the winning candidates. To cite some examples: In the Bori gram panchayat polls in the Pune district, NOTA polled 85.57% votes; in the Mankarwadi gram panchayat polls in same district, 204 of a total 330 valid votes went to NOTA. The sarpanch of Khugaon Khurd in Nanded district got just 120 votes while NOTA had got 627 of the total 849 votes. Similarly, in a local election in the Khavadi village in Lanja tehsil, the winning candidate got 130 votes of 441 valid votes, while NOTA polled 210 votes.

Considering this, the Maharashtra SEC decided to consider amending the existing laws on NOTA. In November 2018, the SEC announced that if NOTA gets the maximum votes in an election, re-elections would be held. The order would be applicable to polls and by-polls to all municipal corporations, municipal councils and nagar panchayats with immediate effect. If NOTA gets the highest number of votes in the re-election as well, the candidate with the most votes, excluding NOTA, will be declared the winner. However, the rejected candidates are not barred from re-elections.

The Haryana SEC followed suit too, declaring in November 2018 that NOTA would be treated as a fictional candidate and re-elections would be conducted if NOTA won the majority vote in the upcoming Municipal Elections in December 2018.

== See also ==
- Combined approval voting
- None of the above
