= Indian Secular Largest Assembly of Maharashtra =

Local political party in Maharashtra, India

- Abbreviation: ISLAM
- Leader: Shaikh Aasif Shaikh Rashid
- President: Shaikh Aasif Shaikh Rashid
- Chairman: Shaikh Aasif Shaikh Rashid
- Founder: Shaikh Aasif Shaikh Rashid
- Political position: Centre
- ECI status: Registered
- Alliance: Malegaon Secular Front(SP)

The Indian Secular Largest Assembly of Maharashtra (ISLAM) is a regional political party based in the city of Malegaon, Maharashtra, India. In the 2025–26 Maharashtra local elections it became the single largest party in the Malegaon Municipal Corporation with 35 of 84 seats. The party was founded in October 2024 by Shaikh Aasif Shaikh Rashid, a former member of the Maharashtra Legislative Assembly representing the Malegaon Central constituency. Shaikh had previously been a member of the Indian National Congress before launching ISLAM for the 2024–25 election cycle.

== See also ==
- All India Majlis-e-Ittehadul Muslimeen
