= Salpe-Kharmare =

Village in Maharashtra

Salape-Kharmare is a village situated in Sahyadri range in Konkan region near the city of Karjat, In the state of Maharashtra, India. The village is located 75 km from Mumbai, 42 km from Panvel-Navi Mumbai and 105 km form Pune and its official language is Marathi. The nearest railway station is Karjat.
