= Dhalwadi =

Village in Maharashtra

Dhalwadi is a small village in Karjat Taluka in Ahmednagar district of Maharashtra State, India. It belongs to the Khandesh and Northern Maharashtra regions. It is located 80 kilometers south from the district headquarters of Ahmednagar and 272 km from Mumbai.
