= 2026 Jalna Municipal Corporation election =

Elections for Jalna City Municipal Corporation Election on 15 Jan 2026 in Jalna

- 15 January 2026

All 64 seats in Jalna Municipal Corporation 32 seats needed for a majority
- Turnout: 52.94%(▼2.59 pp)

	First party	Second party
Leader	Kailas Gorantyal	Arjun Khotkar
Party	BJP	SHS
Last election	NA	NA
Seats won	41	12
Seat change	▲41	▲12
	Third party	Fourth party
Leader		Majed Shaikh
Party	INC	AIMIM
Last election	NA	NA
Seats won	9	2
Seat change	▲9	▲2
JCMC majority before election
Not present
Elected JCMC majority
BJP

The 2026 Jalna Municipal Corporation election took place on 15 January 2026 to elect members to the Jalna Municipal Corporation of Jalna City, the second largest city in Marathwada. Voting lasted one day and the results were declared on 16th January. The Bharatiya Janata Party handily won the majority securing 41 of the 64 seats.

== Schedule ==
=== Ward Structure Event ===
Structure Event	Schedule
Draft Ward Structure	1 February 2023
Objections and Suggestion	14 February 2023
Final draft will be Submitted	2 March 2023

=== Poll Event ===
Poll Event	Schedule
15 December 2025
Last Date for filing nomination	30 December 2025
Scrutiny of Nominations	31 December 2025
Withdrawal of Candidature	2 January 2026
Date of Poll	15 January 2026
Date of Counting	16 January 2026

== Parties and alliances ==
Party	Flag	Symbols	Leader	Seats contested
Bharatiya Janata Party			Kailas Gorantyal	63 (Note: BJP did not contest in Ward 11C and 11D.)
Shiv Sena			Arjun Khotkar	62 (Note: BJP and SHS had a friendly fight in most wards of JMC.)
Indian National Congress				43
Nationalist Congress Party				38
Shiv Sena (Uddhav Balasaheb Thackeray)				12
All India Majlis-e-Ittehadul Muslimeen			Majed Shaikh	17
Maharashtra Navnirman Sena				5
Nationalist Congress Party (Sharadchandra Pawar)				13
Vanchit Bahujan Aaghadi				19
Rashtriya Samaj Paksha				1
Aam Aadmi Party				10
Bahujan Samaj Party				11
Samajwadi Party				1

== See also ==
- 2026 elections in India
- Aurangabad Municipal Corporation
- 2026 Brihanmumbai Municipal Corporation election
- 2026 Nagpur Municipal Corporation election
