= Malegaon Assembly constituency =

Constituency of the Maharashtra legislative assembly in India

Malegaon
- Former constituency for the Maharashtra Legislative Assembly

Constituency details
- Country: India
- Region: Western India
- State: Maharashtra
- Established: 1962
- Abolished: 2008
- Total electors: 243,955

Malegaon Assembly constituency was an assembly constituency in the India state of Maharashtra.

== Members of the Legislative Assembly ==
| Election | Member | Party |
|---|---|---|
| 1962 | Haroon Ahmed Ansari | Indian National Congress |
| 1967 | Nihal Ahmed Maulavi Mohammed Usman | Praja Socialist Party |
| 1972 | Asisha Chiragh Hakim | Indian National Congress |
| 1978 | Nihal Ahmed Maulavi Mohammed Usman | Janata Party |
| 1980 | Nihal Ahmed Maulavi Mohammed Usman | Janata Party |
| 1985 | Nihal Ahmed Maulavi Mohammed Usman | Janata Party |
| 1990 | Nihal Ahmed Maulavi Mohammed Usman | Janata Dal |
| 1995 | Nihal Ahmed Maulavi Mohammed Usman | Janata Dal |
| 1999 | Shaikh Rashid Haji Shaikh Shaffi | Indian National Congress |
| 2004 | Shaikh Rashid Haji Shaikh Shaffi | Indian National Congress |

== Election results ==
=== Assembly Election 2004 ===
2004 Maharashtra Legislative Assembly election : Malegaon
| Party | Candidate | Votes | % | ±% |
|---|---|---|---|---|
| INC | Shaikh Rashid Haji Shaikh Shaffi | 80,579 | 49.85% | ▼3.97 |
| BJP | Gaikwad Sunil (Aaba) Babulal | 10,398 | 6.43% | ▼0.13 |
| SP | Moh. Yunus Sh. Isa | 6,483 | 4.01% | New |
| BSP | Dr. Ansari Javeed Ah.Abdul Razzaque | 1,988 | 1.23% | New |
| Margin of victory | | 70,181 | 43.42% | ▲24.49 |
| Turnout | | 161,631 | 66.25% | ▲6.21 |
| Registered electors | | 243,955 | | ▲5.91 |
| INC hold | | Swing | ▼3.97 | |

=== Assembly Election 1999 ===
1999 Maharashtra Legislative Assembly election : Malegaon
| Party | Candidate | Votes | % | ±% |
|---|---|---|---|---|
| INC | Shaikh Rashid Haji Shaikh Shaffi | 74,433 | 53.82% | ▲40.18 |
| JD(S) | Nihal Ahmed Maulavi Mohammed Usman | 48,254 | 34.89% | New |
| BJP | Tapadiya Govind Kanhaiyalal | 9,082 | 6.57% | ▼8.70 |
| ABS | Shakil Ahamad Mohammad Hasan (Jober) | 2,665 | 1.93% | New |
| Margin of victory | | 26,179 | 18.93% | ▼1.39 |
| Turnout | | 138,301 | 58.48% | ▼6.79 |
| Registered electors | | 230,334 | | ▲0.26 |
| INC gain from JD | | Swing | ▲11.08 | |

=== Assembly Election 1995 ===
1995 Maharashtra Legislative Assembly election : Malegaon
| Party | Candidate | Votes | % | ±% |
|---|---|---|---|---|
| JD | Nihal Ahmed Maulavi Mohammed Usman | 65,621 | 42.74% | ▼7.65 |
| Independent | Shaikh Rashid Haji Shaikh Shaffi | 34,418 | 22.42% | New |
| BJP | Sharma Pralhad Badrinarayan | 23,437 | 15.27% | ▼4.17 |
| INC | Moh. Yunus Sh. Isa | 20,948 | 13.64% | ▼12.81 |
| Independent | Qureshi Md. Hanif Md. Umar | 1,910 | 1.24% | New |
| BSP | Abdul Khalik Khatib Abdul Hakim | 1,114 | 0.73% | New |
| Margin of victory | | 31,203 | 20.32% | ▼3.62 |
| Turnout | | 153,532 | 65.41% | ▼4.14 |
| Registered electors | | 229,733 | | ▲20.92 |
| JD hold | | Swing | ▼7.65 | |

=== Assembly Election 1990 ===
1990 Maharashtra Legislative Assembly election : Malegaon
| Party | Candidate | Votes | % | ±% |
|---|---|---|---|---|
| JD | Nihal Ahmed Maulavi Mohammed Usman | 67,944 | 50.39% | New |
| INC | Haji Shabbir Ahmed Haji Gulam Rasool | 35,668 | 26.46% | ▼16.35 |
| BJP | Sharma Pralhad Badrinarayan | 26,209 | 19.44% | New |
| Independent | Shahnawaj Ab. Salam | 1,054 | 0.78% | New |
| Margin of victory | | 32,276 | 23.94% | ▲20.86 |
| Turnout | | 134,824 | 70.17% | ▲0.15 |
| Registered electors | | 189,984 | | ▲27.95 |
| JD gain from JP | | Swing | ▲4.51 | |

=== Assembly Election 1985 ===
1985 Maharashtra Legislative Assembly election : Malegaon
| Party | Candidate | Votes | % | ±% |
|---|---|---|---|---|
| JP | Nihal Ahmed Maulavi Mohammed Usman | 48,254 | 45.89% | ▼4.31 |
| INC | Haji Shabbir Ahmed Haji Gulam Rasool | 45,016 | 42.81% | New |
| Independent | Yogibaba Anandnathji | 5,703 | 5.42% | New |
| Independent | Farqlit Abdul Khalique Md. Husain | 3,313 | 3.15% | New |
| Independent | Magare Vithal Dhama | 788 | 0.75% | New |
| Margin of victory | | 3,238 | 3.08% | ▲0.90 |
| Turnout | | 105,157 | 69.95% | ▲2.33 |
| Registered electors | | 148,485 | | ▲19.83 |
| JP hold | | Swing | ▼4.31 | |

=== Assembly Election 1980 ===
1980 Maharashtra Legislative Assembly election : Malegaon
| Party | Candidate | Votes | % | ±% |
|---|---|---|---|---|
| JP | Nihal Ahmed Maulavi Mohammed Usman | 42,604 | 50.20% | ▼6.37 |
| INC(I) | Shabbir Ahmed Haji Gulam Rasool | 40,756 | 48.02% | ▲40.49 |
| Margin of victory | | 1,848 | 2.18% | ▼31.41 |
| Turnout | | 84,866 | 67.70% | ▼7.00 |
| Registered electors | | 123,911 | | ▲12.02 |
| JP hold | | Swing | | |

=== Assembly Election 1978 ===
1978 Maharashtra Legislative Assembly election : Malegaon
| Party | Candidate | Votes | % | ±% |
|---|---|---|---|---|
| JP | Nihal Ahmed Maulavi Mohammed Usman | 47,237 | 56.57% | New |
| AIML | Gazi Naseem Ahmed Khan Md. Mardan | 19,192 | 22.98% | New |
| INC(I) | Hakim Aisha Chiragha Hasan | 6,288 | 7.53% | New |
| Independent | Gawali Bhima Daga | 5,936 | 7.11% | New |
| Independent | Magare Vithal Dhama | 3,431 | 4.11% | New |
| Margin of victory | | 28,045 | 33.59% | ▲25.55 |
| Turnout | | 83,501 | 74.20% | ▲4.61 |
| Registered electors | | 110,620 | | ▲3.00 |
| JP gain from INC | | Swing | ▲8.17 | |

=== Assembly Election 1972 ===
1972 Maharashtra Legislative Assembly election : Malegaon
| Party | Candidate | Votes | % | ±% |
|---|---|---|---|---|
| INC | Asisha Chiragh Hakim | 36,848 | 48.40% | ▲23.78 |
| SSP | Nihal Ahmed Maulavi Mohammed Usman | 30,729 | 40.37% | New |
| ABJS | Eknath Mahadu Tisge | 2,125 | 2.79% | ▼6.55 |
| CPI | B. A. Haroon | 1,908 | 2.51% | New |
| Independent | Ah. Vahid Md. Amin | 1,520 | 2.00% | New |
| Independent | S. Ahmed Md. Ismail | 895 | 1.18% | New |
| Margin of victory | | 6,119 | 8.04% | ▼5.48 |
| Turnout | | 76,125 | 69.20% | ▲0.40 |
| Registered electors | | 107,403 | | ▲33.90 |
| INC gain from PSP | | Swing | ▲10.26 | |

=== Assembly Election 1967 ===
1967 Maharashtra Legislative Assembly election : Malegaon
| Party | Candidate | Votes | % | ±% |
|---|---|---|---|---|
| PSP | Nihal Ahmed Maulavi Mohammed Usman | 21,565 | 38.15% | ▲0.65 |
| INC | H. A. Ansari | 13,924 | 24.63% | ▼14.58 |
| Independent | K. A. Kasamali | 11,186 | 19.79% | New |
| ABJS | G. M. Puntambekar | 5,282 | 6.94% | New |
| Independent | S. A. M. Ismail | 351 | 0.46% | New |
| Margin of victory | | 7,641 | 13.52% | ▲11.80 |
| Turnout | | 56,534 | 65.35% | ▲6.49 |
| Registered electors | | 80,212 | | ▼16.18 |
| PSP gain from INC | | Swing | ▼1.07 | |

=== Assembly Election 1962 ===
1962 Maharashtra Legislative Assembly election : Malegaon
| Party | Candidate | Votes | % | ±% |
|---|---|---|---|---|
| INC | Haroon Ahmed Ansari | 24,011 | 39.21% | New |
| PSP | A. Moulavi M. Usman Nihal | 22,962 | 37.50% | New |
| CPI | Aziz Haji A. Hamid Shoukat | 5,902 | 9.64% | New |
| Independent | Ahmadkhan M. Mardankhan (Gazi) Mobin | 2,246 | 3.67% | New |
| Socialist | Madhukar Bhikaji Chavan | 1,091 | 1.78% | New |
| Independent | Yashwant Sadashiv Shirke | 1,075 | 1.76% | New |
| Margin of victory | | 1,049 | 1.71% | |
| Turnout | | 61,233 | 59.86% | |
| Registered electors | | 95,695 | | |
| INC win (new seat) | | | | |
