= Shaikh Aasif Shaikh Rashid =

Indian politician

Member of the Maharashtra Legislative Assembly
- In office 2014–2019
- Preceded by: Mohammed Ismail Abdul Khalique
- Succeeded by: Mohammed Ismail Abdul Khalique
- Constituency: Malegaon Central

Personal details
- Born: Malegaon, India
- Party: Indian Secular Largest Assembly of Maharashtra
- Other political affiliations: Indian National Congress; Nationalist Congress Party
- Children: 2
- Occupation: Politician

Shaikh Aasif Shaikh Rasheed is an Indian politician from Maharashtra. He was a Member of the Maharashtra Legislative Assembly from 2014-2019.

== Political career ==
He won from the Malegaon Central Vidhan Sabha constituency in the 2014 Maharashtra Assembly election.

Asif again contested the Maharashtra Assembly Election as Congress candidate in 2019 from Malegaon Central seat but lost to AIMIM candidate Mufti Ismail.

In 2022, Asif resigned from the Congress Party and joined Sharad Pawar's NCP along with his father Shaikh Rasheed .

After the split in the NCP, Asif Shaikh announced to contest the 2024 Maharashtra Assembly Election as Independent. He however launched a new political party 'Indian Secular Largest Assembly of Maharashtra' or 'I.S.L.A.M.' on October 20, 2024, also announcing himself to be the candidate of the new party from Malegaon Central assembly seat for the 2024 Maharashtra Vidhan Sabha Polls.

Ultimately, he lost the polls by a narrow margin of 162 votes to AIMIM candidate Mufti Ismail.
