= Mohammed Ismail Abdul Khalique =

Indian politician, Cleric

Member of the Maharashtra Legislative Assembly
- Incumbent
- Assumed office 10 October 2019
- Preceded by: Shaikh Aasif Shaikh Rashid
- Constituency: Malegaon Central
- In office 22 October 2009 – 19 October 2014
- Preceded by: Shaikh Rashid Haji Shaffi
- Succeeded by: Shaikh Aasif Shaikh Rashid
- Constituency: Malegaon Central

Floor Leader of All India Majlis-e-Ittehadul Muslimeen in Maharashtra Legislative Assembly
- Incumbent
- Assumed office 10 October 2019
- Preceded by: Waris Pathan

Personal details
- Born: Malegaon, India
- Party: All India Majlis-e-Ittehadul Muslimeen
- Other political affiliations: Nationalist Congress Party; Jan Surajya Shakti
- Education: Darul-ulum Deoband
- Occupation: Politician
- Profession: Politician, cleric

Mohammad Ismail Abdul Khalique is an Islamic scholar and an Indian politician from Malegaon city, Maharashtra. He has served two terms as Member of the Maharashtra Legislative Assembly. He won from the Malegaon Central (Vidhan Sabha constituency). He first won in 2009 by Jan Surajya Shakti. In 2014, he joined Nationalist Congress Party and contested elections, but lost. In 2019, he joined AIMIM. He is also general secretary of Jamiat Ulema-e-Hind.

== Personal life ==
In 2020, Khalique was arrested for barging into a hospital in Malegaon with his supporters and manhandling a doctor and hospital staff for not attending his calls. Ismail claimed he and his followers were polite and non-violent.

== Political career ==
He has been affiliated with different political parties. He began his political career as a member of the Jan Surajya Shakti party, serving as an MLA from the Malegaon Central Assembly constituency in Maharashtra from 2009 to 2014.

In 2019, Khalique transitioned to the All India Majlis-e-Ittehadul Muslimeen (AIMIM) and contested the 2019 Maharashtra Legislative Assembly election from the Malegaon Central Assembly constituency. During this election, he secured a resounding victory with 1,16,906 votes, representing 58.52% of the total vote share.

He got re-elected from the Malegaon Central Assembly constituency as an All India Majlis-e-Ittehadul Muslimeen in the 2024 Maharashtra Legislative Assembly. He won by a narrow margin of 162 votes.

== Positions held ==
#	From	To	Position	Political party
1.	2009	2014	MLA (1st term) from Malegaon Central	Jan Surajya Shakti
2.	2019	2024	MLA (2nd term) from Malegaon Central	All India Majlis-e-Ittehadul Muslimeen
3.	2024		MLA (3rd term) from Malegaon Central	All India Majlis-e-Ittehadul Muslimeen
