= Malegaon Fort =

Fort in Malegaon, Maharashtra

- Nashik district, Maharashtra
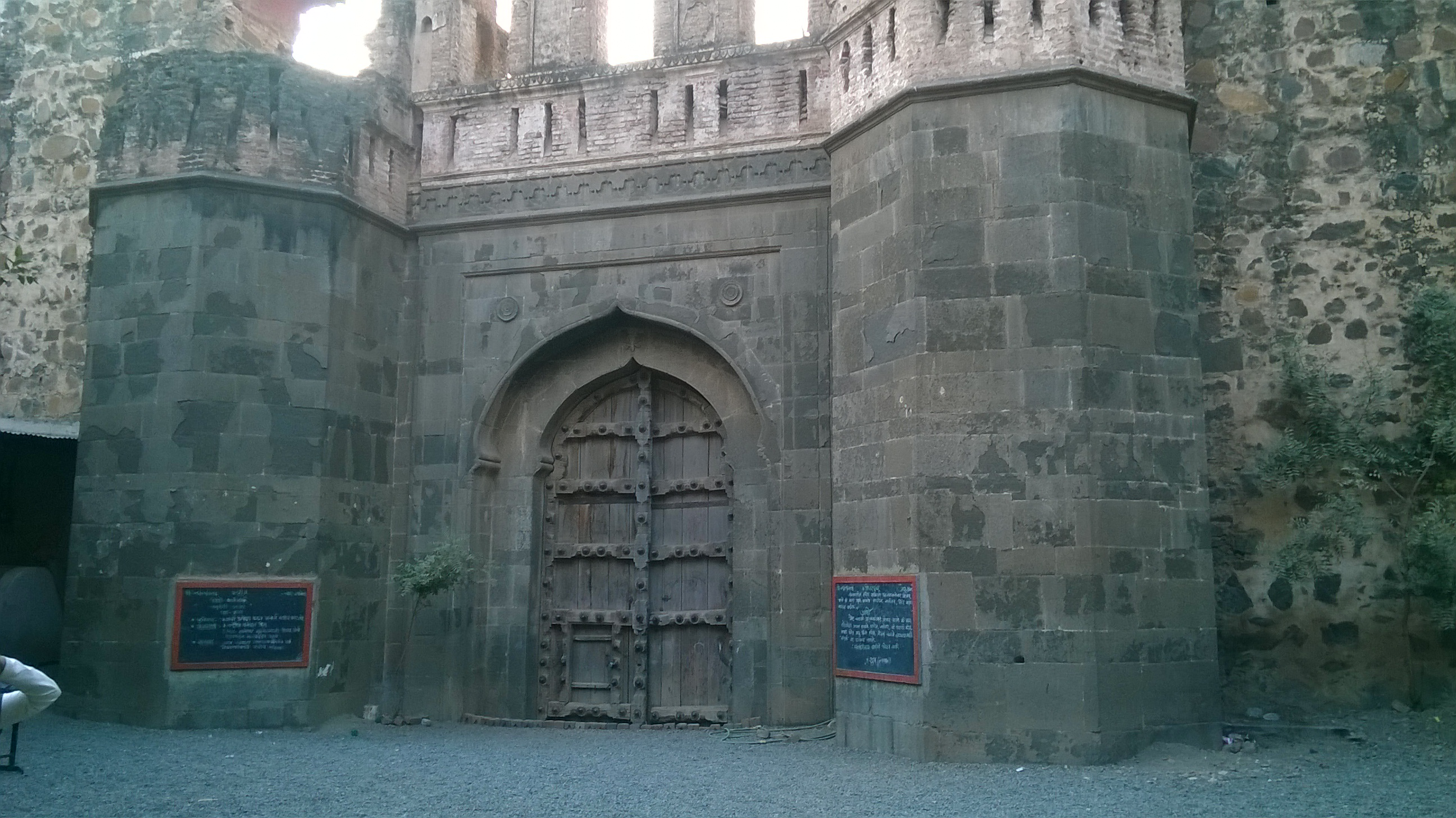
- Malegaon fort

Site information
- Type: land fort
- Owner: India
- Controlled by: Maratha Empire (1740-1818); United Kingdom: East India Company (1818-1857); British Raj (1857-1947); India (1947-)
- Open to the public: Yes
- Condition: Good

Location
- Shown within Maharashtra
- Coordinates: 20°32′43.4″N 74°31′47.6″E
- Height: 1437Ft.

Site history
- Materials: Stone

Malegaon Fort is a land fort located in the town of Malegaon. It is located 104 km from Nashik, in Nashik district, of Maharashtra. The fort is on the north bank of the Mausam river, which is a tributary of the Girna river. It was built during the Maratha Empire.

== History ==
Malegaon Fort was constructed in 1740 by Naro Shankar Raje Bahadur, general of the Peshwa. He was appointed as an agent in Malwa. He was gifted 18 villages which included Malewadi. Craftsmen were brought in from Surat and northern India to build the fort, the construction of which took 25 years. After the fort was completed, the craftsmen settled in the town.

In 1816, a Rohilla sepoy named Dilawar Khan constructed the first Eidgah in the town.

After the fall of Trymbakgad fort on 24 May 1818, Malegaon Fort was besieged on 16 May 1818 by the East India Company.

== How to reach ==
The fort is located within the town of Malegaon. Malegaon is located on the Mumbai-Agra National highway NH-3. The fort is also known as the Raje Bahadur Wada. It is close to the Ramsetu bridge. The fort is open to the public between 10 am and 5 pm. At present, there is a Marathi high school in the premises of the fort.

== Places to see ==
The fort is in good condition. The height of the inner wall is 60 feet. The fort has lofty entrance doors. The thickness of the walls is about six feet. There are two cannons at the entrance door and a hexagonal well inside the fort. It takes about an hour to see the fort.

== Gallery ==
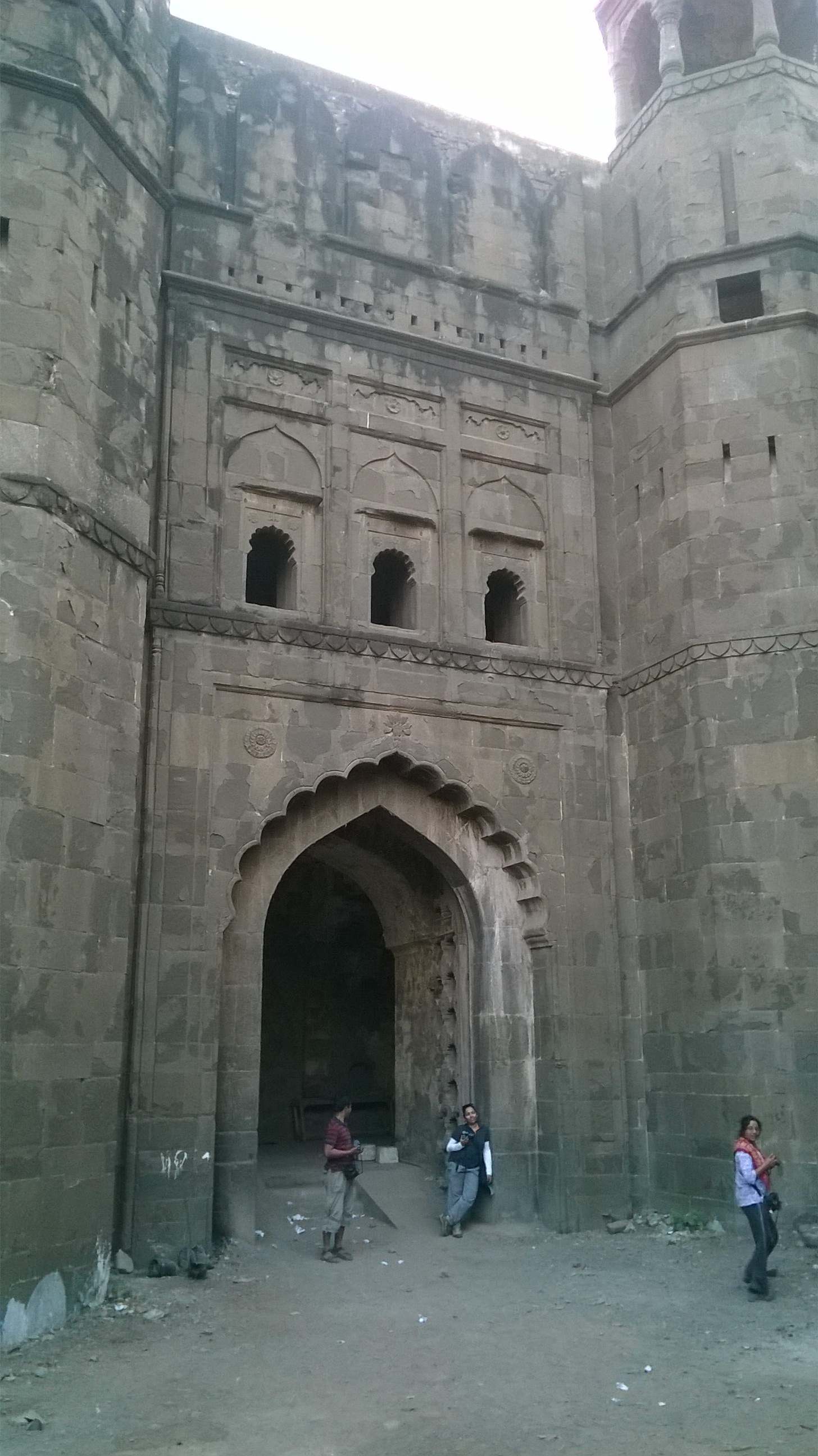
Eastern gate of Malegaon fort

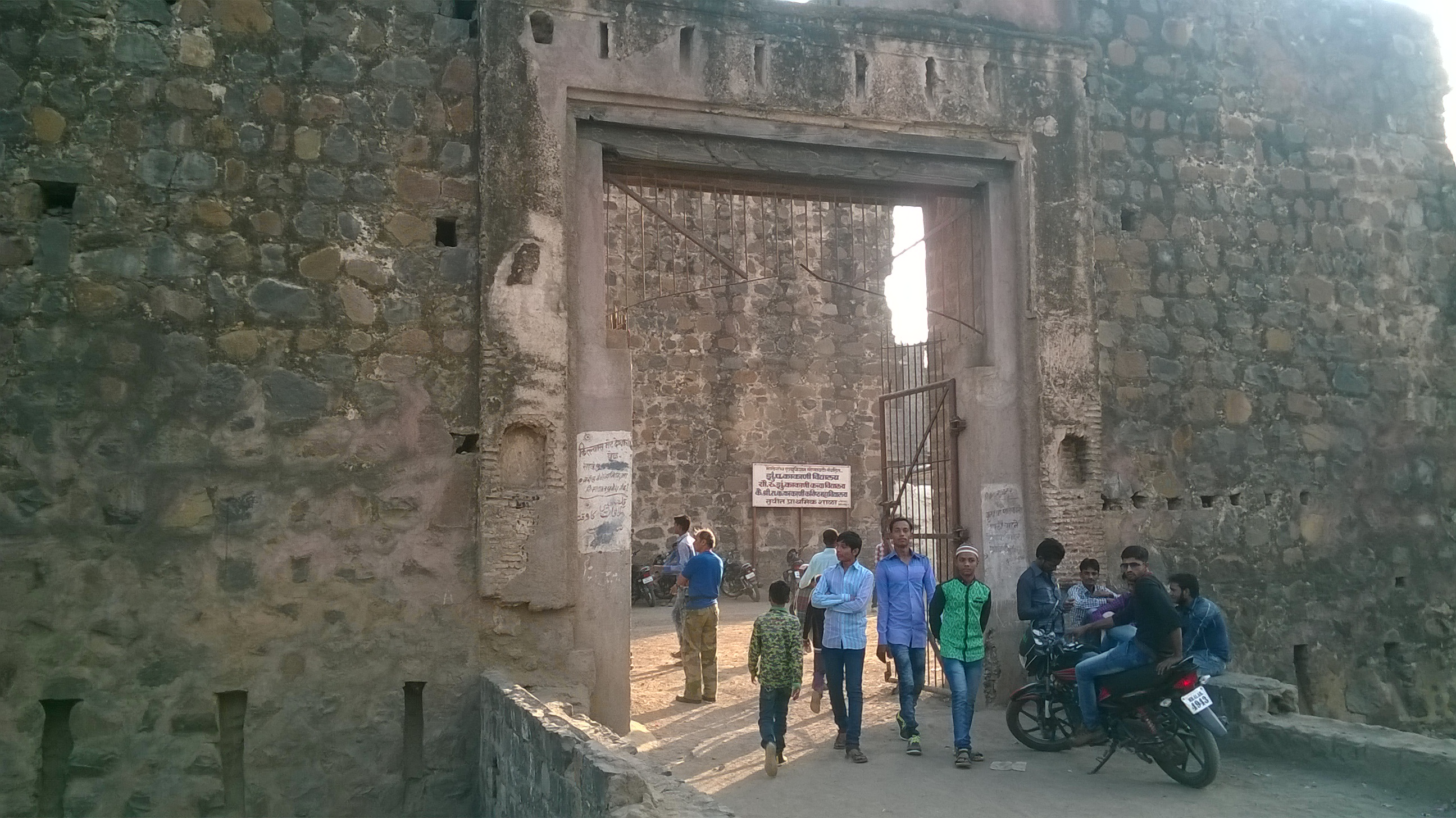
Northern gate

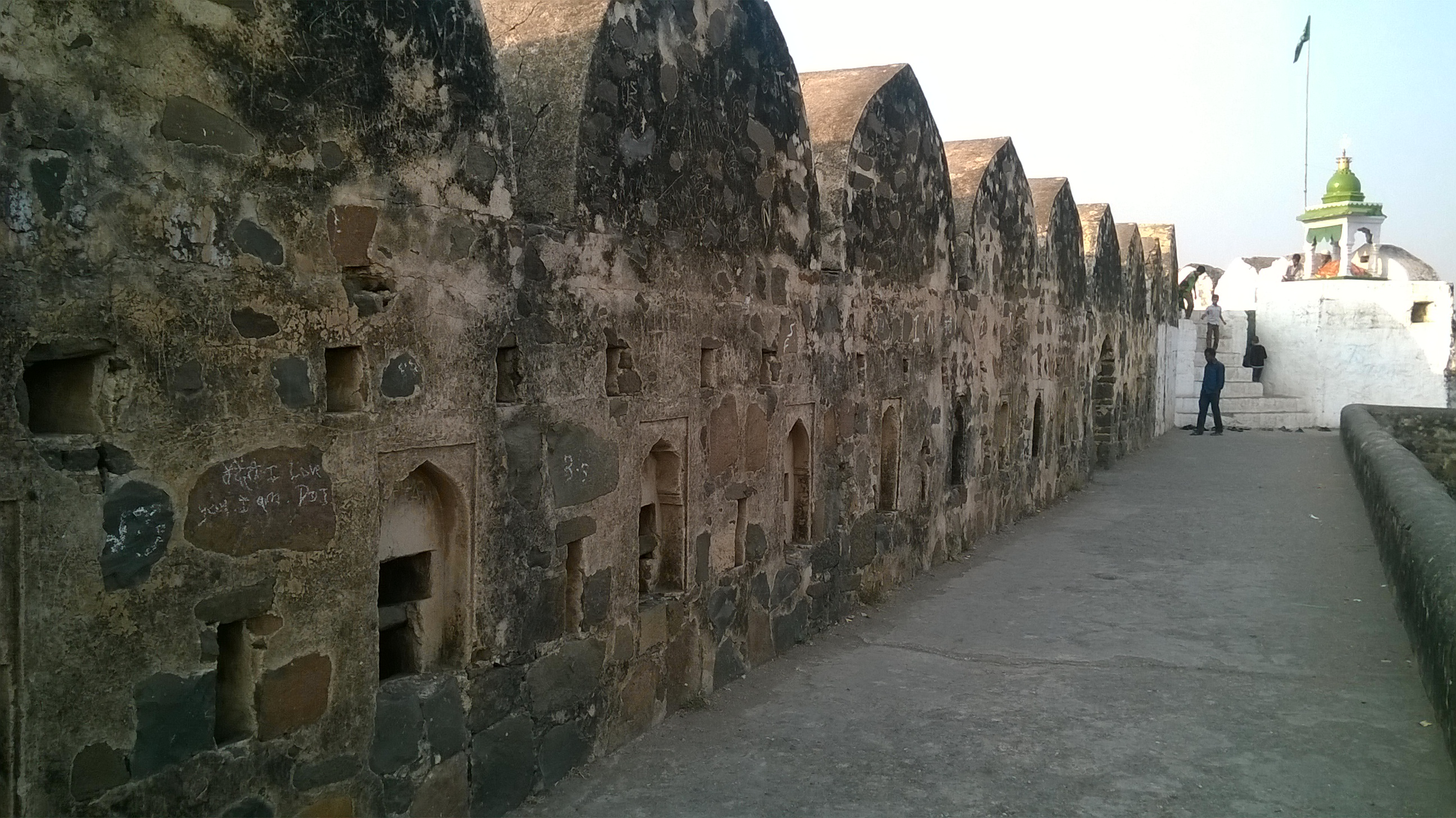
Malegaon fort

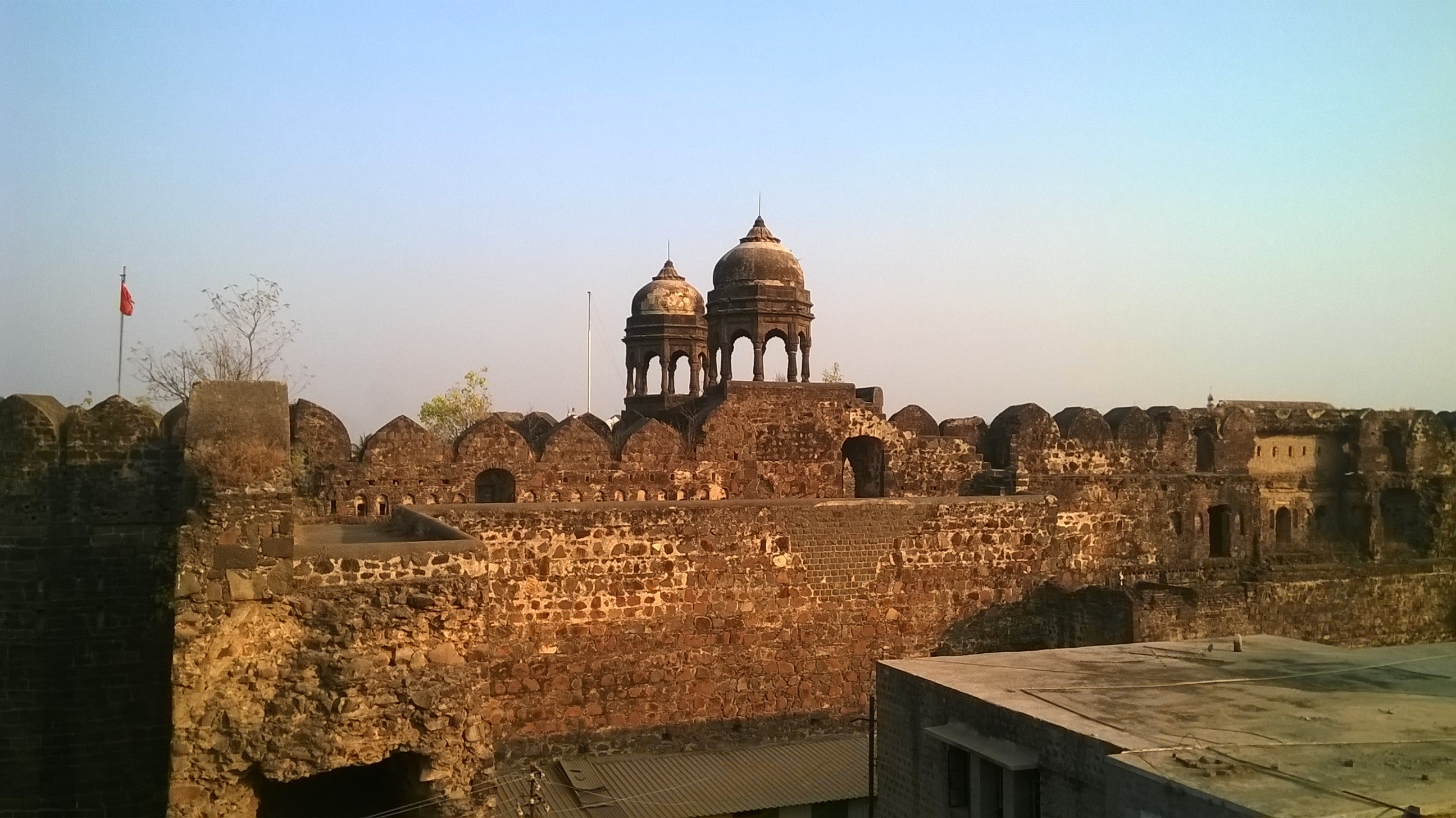
Malegaon fort

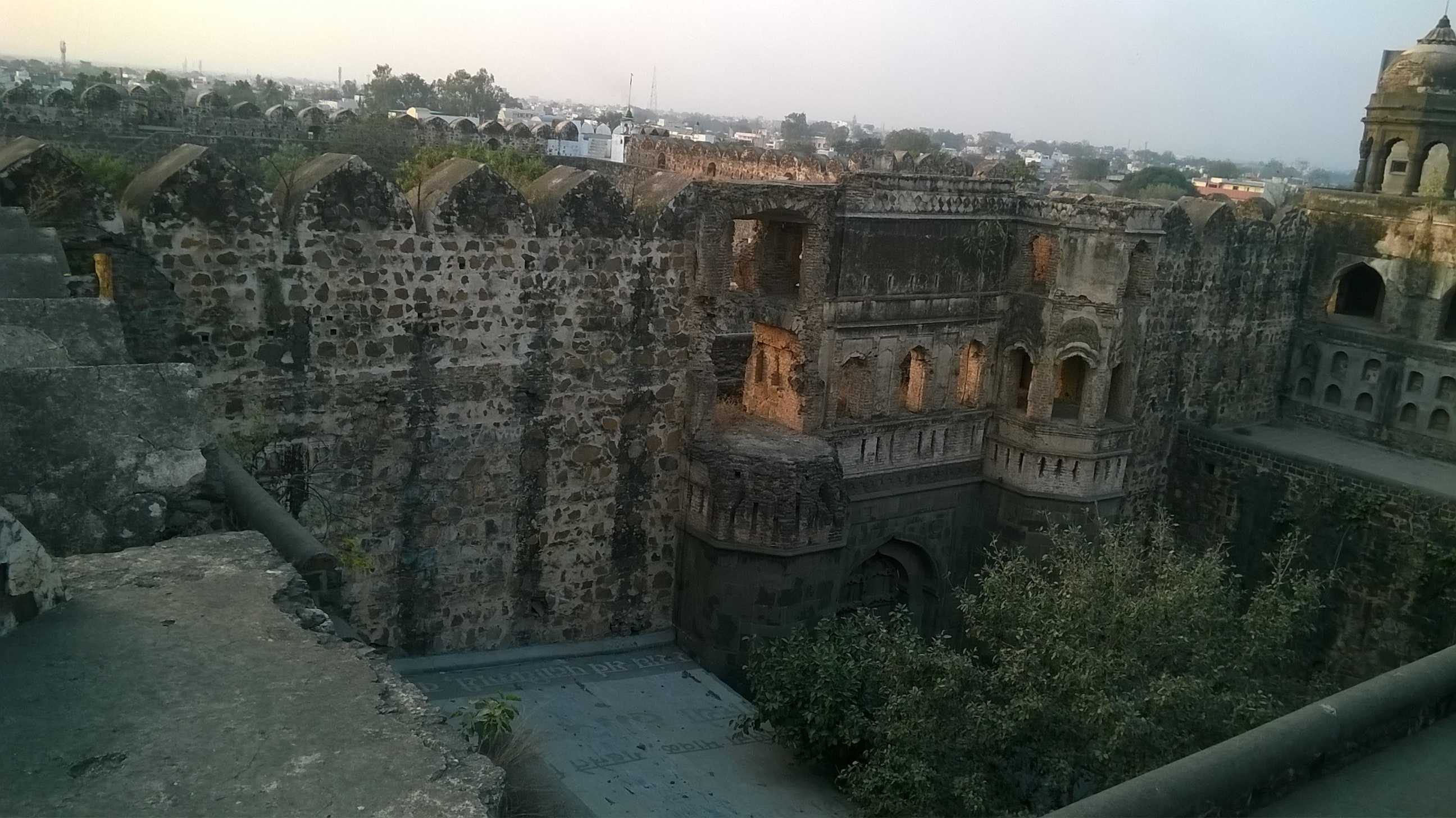
Malegaon fort

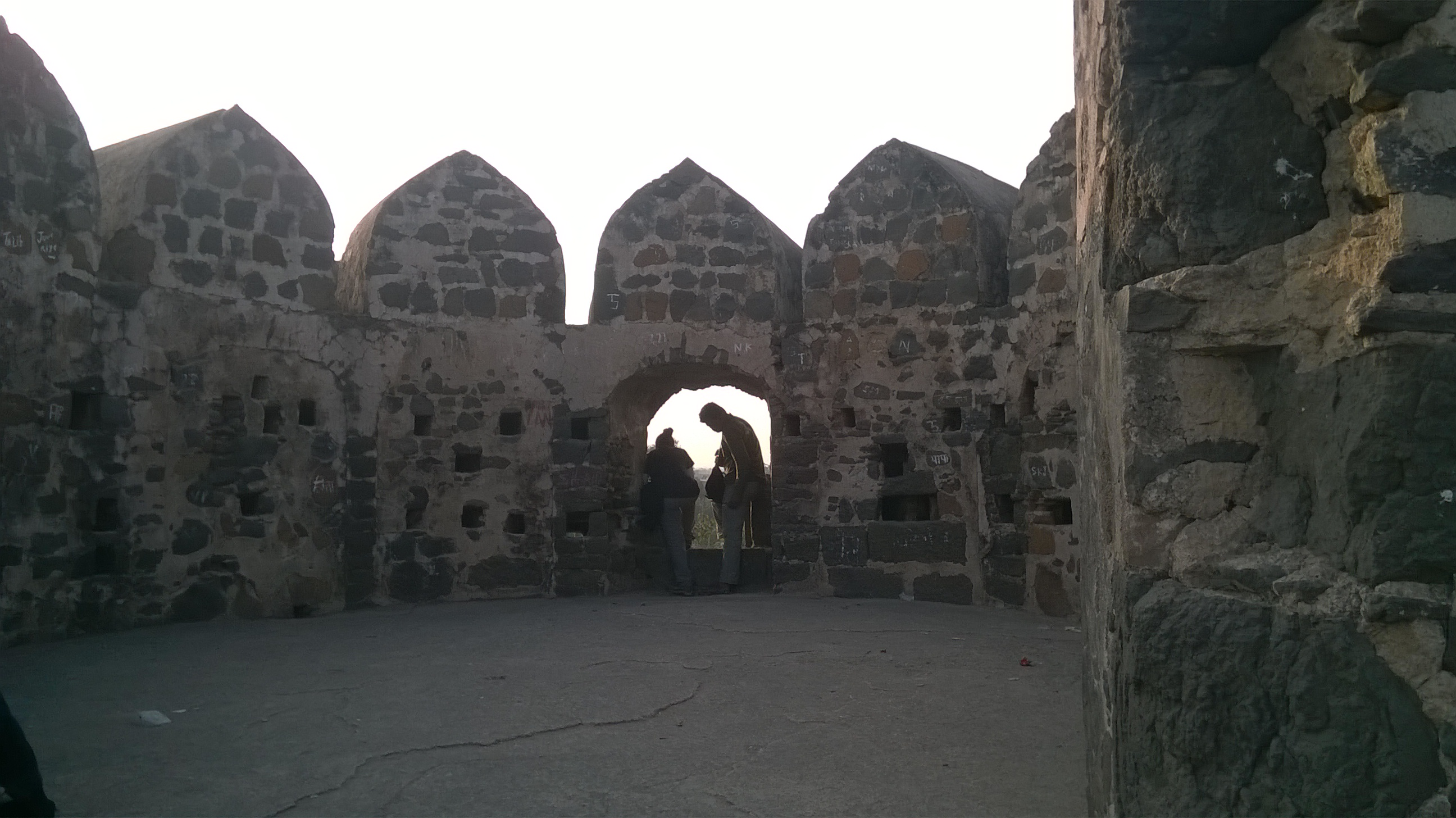
Bastion

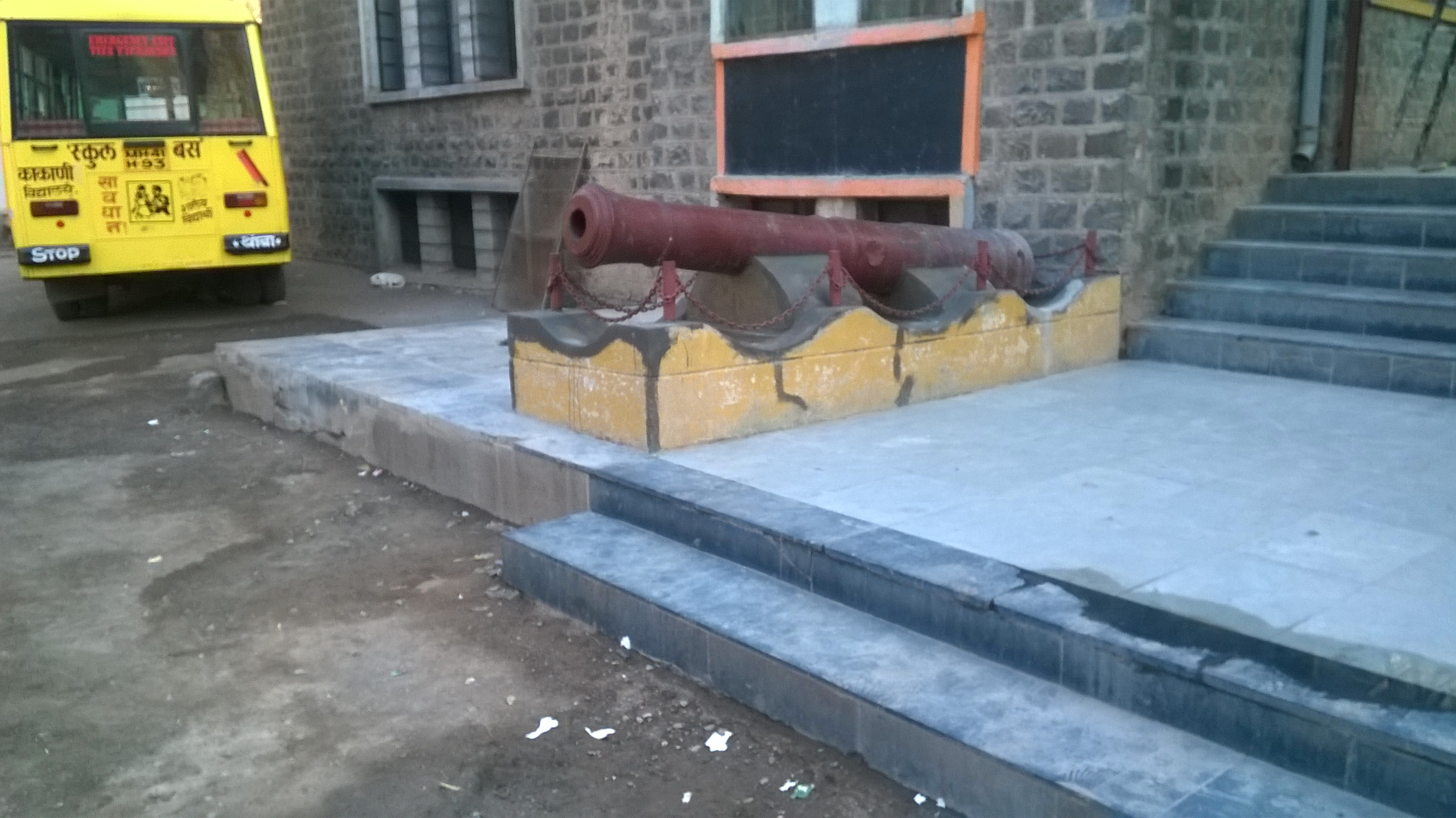
Cannon on the fort

== See also ==
- List of forts in Maharashtra
- List of forts in India
- Peshwa
- Marathi People
- List of Maratha dynasties and states
- Maratha War of Independence
- Battles involving the Maratha Empire
- Maratha Army
- Maratha titles
- Military history of India
