= Jalna City Municipal Corporation =

Local government body in Maharashtra, India

Type
- Type: Municipal Corporation of the Jalna, Maharashtra of India

History
- Founded: 07 August 2023 (3 years ago)
- Preceded by: Jalna Municipal Council

Leadership
- Mayor: Smt.Vandana Magre, BJP since 2026
- Deputy Mayor: Shri.Rajesh Raut, BJP since 2026
- Municipal Commissioner & Administrator: Smt.Anjali Sharma

Structure
- Seats: 65
- Political groups: Government (41): BJP (41); Opposition (24): SHS (12); INC (9); AIMIM (2); IND (1)

Elections
- Voting system: First pass the post
- Last election: 15 January 2026
- Next election: 2031

Motto
- "एकदृष्टी: | एकप्रयत्न: | नगरसमृद्धी: "

Website
- Jalna City Municipal Corporation

Constitution
- Constitution of India

Footnotes
- New Established in 2023

Jalna City Municipal Corporation (JMC) become 29th Municipal Corporation in Maharashtra and 5th in Aurangabad Division is a Local Government body of administrating Jalna City in Jalna district of Maharashtra, India. that is responsible for providing essential public services to the residents of the city of Jalna. The council is composed of elected representatives who make important decisions regarding the development and management of the city.

JMC's primary responsibilities include providing basic services such as water supply, sanitation, and waste management. It is also responsible for the maintenance of public spaces such as parks, playgrounds, and community centres.

== History ==
The Jalna City Municipal Corporation (JCMC) was officially formed in June 2023,Maharashtra Chief Minister Eknath Shinde government announced Jalna to be 29th Municipal Corporation of Maharashtra with its formal conversion from a municipal council taking effect on August 7, 2023.

It was established as Maharashtra's 29th municipal corporation, serving as the civic governing body for the city of Jalna.

Significance: It was established to improve urban administration, becoming the fifth municipal corporation in the Marathwada region.

=== First election ===
The first elections for the newly formed corporation were held with results announced on January 16, 2026.

== Administration ==
Jalna City Municipal Corporation (JCMC) is the local urban governing body responsible for the civic administration of Jalna city in Maharashtra, India. The Municipal Corporation was established in Year 2023 to administer the growing urban area of Jalna. Over time, the jurisdiction of JCMC has expanded in line with the city’s population growth and urban development needs, covering an area of approximately 81.6 km².

The city is administratively divided into 16 electoral wards (locally known as Prabhag), each represented by four elected Corporator. The elected council forms the General Body, which functions as the primary decision-making authority of the Municipal Corporation. Key statutory committees, including the Standing Committee, oversee financial planning, project approvals, and municipal governance.

The administrative wing of JMC is headed by the Municipal Commissioner or Administrator, a state-appointed officer responsible for the execution of council resolutions and day-to-day municipal operations. The Municipal Commissioner or Administrator is supported by department heads overseeing public works, water supply, sanitation, health services, town planning, accounts, taxation, and education.

JCMC is responsible for providing essential urban services such as:

- Drinking water supply
- Sewerage and drainage systems
- Solid waste management
- Construction and maintenance of roads
- Street lighting
- Public health services
- Primary education and municipal schools
- Markets, gardens, and public amenities
- City Garbage waste Management
- Keep City Clean & Green
- Control on Land Encroachment

The Municipal Corporation generates revenue through property tax, water charges, sanitation fees, building permissions, trade licenses, and grants from the state and central governments. JCMC plays a vital role in urban planning, implementation of state and central government schemes, and improving civic infrastructure to support Jalna’s socio-economic development.

== Revenue sources ==
The following are the income sources for the corporation from the central and state governments.

=== Revenue from taxes ===
Following is the tax related revenue for the corporation.

- Property tax.
- Profession tax.
- Entertainment tax.
- Grants from Central and State Government like Goods and Services Tax.
- Advertisement tax.

=== Revenue from non-tax sources ===
Following is the non-tax related revenue for the corporation.

- Water usage charges.
- Fees from documentation services.
- Rent received from municipal property.
- Funds from municipal bonds.

== List of mayors ==
#	Portrait	Name	Term			Election	Party
1		Vandana Magre	9 February 2026	Incumbent	184 days	2026	Bharatiya Janata Party

== List of deputy mayors ==
#	Portrait	Name	Term			Election	Party
1		Rajesh Raut	9 February 2026	Incumbent	184 days	2026	Bharatiya Janata Party

== Municipal elections ==
=== Electoral performance 2026 ===
No.	Party name	Party flag or symbol	Number of councillors
1	Bharatiya Janata Party		41
2	Shiv Sena		12
3	Indian National Congress		9
4	All India Majlis-e-Ittehadul Muslimeen		2
5	Others		1

== See also ==
- Aurangabad Municipal Corporation
- Ambad Municipal Council
- Bhokardan Municipal Council
- Partur Municipal Council
- Latur Municipal Corporation
- Nanded-Waghala Municipal Corporation
