= Maharashtra State Election Commission =

Election regulatory body of Maharashtra

- महाराष्ट्र राज्य निवडणूक आयोग; Maharashtra Rajya Nivadnuk Aayog

Agency overview
- Formed: April 26, 1994; 32 years ago
- Headquarters: First Floor, New Administrator Building, Hutatma Rajguru Chowk, Madam Cama Road, Mumbai – 400032
- Agency executive: Dinesh T. Waghmare, State Election Commissioner
- Website: Official website

Maharashtra State Election Commission is an independent agency of Government of Maharashtra established on 26 April 1994. It conducts rural and urban local body elections in the state of Maharashtra.

== List of State Election Commissioners ==
The following have held the post of the State Election Commissioner of Maharashtra.

S. No.	Name	Term of office		
1.	Shri. D. N. Chaudhary	26 April 1994	25 April 1999	4 years, 364 days
2.	Shri. Y. L. Rajwade	15 June 1999	14 June 2004	4 years, 365 days
3.	Shri. Nand Lal	15 June 2004	14 June 2009	4 years, 364 days
4.	Smt. Neela Satyanarayan	7 July 2009	6 July 2014	4 years, 364 days
5.	Shri. Jageshwar Saharia	5 September 2014	4 September 2019	4 years, 364 days
6.	Shri. Urvinder Pal Singh Madan	5 September 2019	4 September 2024	4 years, 365 days
7.	Shri.Dinesh T. Waghmare	28 January 2025	Incumbent	1 year, 192 days
