= 2026 Nagpur Municipal Corporation election =

Election in Maharashtra, India

The Nagpur Municipal Corporation election, 2026 was an election of members to the Nagpur Municipal Corporation which governs Nagpur, the winter capital of the Indian state of Maharashtra. The election took place on 15 January 2026 and the counting took place on 16 January. The Bharatiya Janata Party retained the majority in the corporation, securing a commanding 102 seats out of the 151 seats.

== Delimitation ==
=== Four-member Ward System ===
The city has been divided into 38 prabhags (wards), with four members each; except prabhag number 38.

=== Reservations ===
Fifty percent of the seats were reserved for female candidates through a reservation draw held on 11 November 2025. Seventy-six female candidates and 75 male candidates will contest this election. In the past, it had been observed that many sitting corporaters fielded their wives, mothers or other female family members in a newly reserved seat in order to retain power by proxy, which has drawn criticism.

=== Population and Wards ===
- Population Basis: Each ward was designed to have approximately 70,000 residents. However, prabhag number 38 would have 50,000 residents.
- Impact on Corporators: Delimitation led to the division wards into four parts. Prabhag number 38, with a lower population would have only three representatives.
- Number of voters: About 24,83,112 voters were eligible to vote in the civic elections

== See also ==
- 2026 elections in India
- Nagpur Municipal Corporation
