= Karjat Municipal Council =

Municipal council in Raigad district, Maharashtra

Type
- Type: Municipal Council of the Karjat

History
- Founded: 1992

Leadership
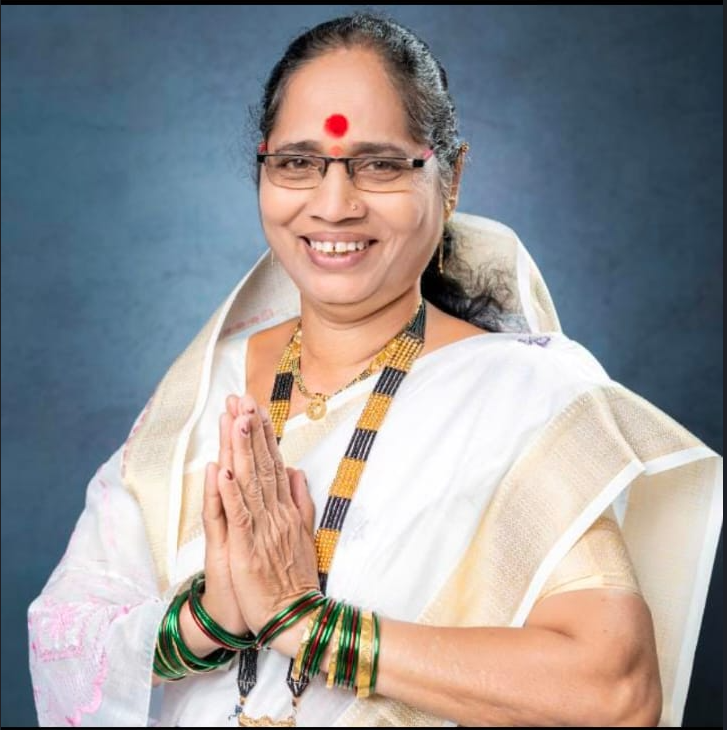
- Mayor: Smt. Pushpa Tai Harishchandra Dagade, [nationalist congress party] Smt. Pushpa Tai Harishchandra Dagade

Elections
- Last election: 2-December-2025

Website
- http://karjatmc.org/

Karjat is the municipal council in Raigad district, Maharashtra.

== History ==
The Karjat municipal council established in 1992.

== Municipal Council election ==
=== Electoral performance 2025 ===
President

1	PUSHPA HARISHCHANDRA DAGADE	Nationalist Congress Party	Winner
2	SWATI AKSHAY LAD	Bharatiya Janata Party	Trailing

S.No.	Party name	Alliance	Party flag or symbol	Number of Corporators
01	Nationalist Congress Party (NCP) + Shiv Sena (UBT)	KARJAT PARIVARTAN VIKAS AGHADI	+ UBT	08+05
02	Shiv Sena (SS) +Bharatiya Janata Party (BJP)	NDA	+ BJP	07+01
