= Chandrapur City Municipal Corporation =

Local civic body in Chandrapur, Maharashtra, India

Type
- Type: Municipal Corporation of the Chandrapur

Leadership
- Mayor: Sangeeta Khandekar, BJP
- Deputy Mayor: Prashant Danav, SS(UBT)
- Municipal Commissioner: Vipin Paliwal

Structure
- Seats: 66
- Political groups: Government (32): BJP (23); SS(UBT) (6); SHS (1); IND (2); Opposition (34): INC (27); PWPI (3); VBA (2); AIMIM (1); BSP (1)

Elections
- Last election: 15 January 2026
- Next election: 2031

Website
- cmcchandrapur.com

The Chandrapur City Municipal Corporation also known as the Municipal Corporation of Chandrapur City (MCCC) is the governing body of the city of Chandrapur in the Indian state of Maharashtra was established on 25 October 2011. The municipal corporation consists of democratically elected members, is headed by a mayor and administers the city's infrastructure, public services. Members from the state's leading political parties hold elected offices in the corporation. Recently the Municipal Corporation has created three nos of Zone offices. Municipal Corporation mechanism in India was introduced during British Rule with formation of municipal corporation in Madras (Chennai) in 1688, later followed by municipal corporations in Bombay (Mumbai) and Calcutta (Kolkata) by 1762. Chandrapur Municipal Corporation has been formed with functions to improve the infrastructure of town.

== Revenue sources ==
The following are the Income sources for the corporation from the Central and State Government.

=== Revenue from taxes ===
Following is the Tax related revenue for the corporation.

- Property tax.
- Profession tax.
- Entertainment tax.
- Grants from Central and State Government like Goods and Services Tax.
- Advertisement tax.

=== Revenue from non-tax sources ===
Following is the Non Tax related revenue for the corporation.

- Water usage charges.
- Fees from Documentation services.
- Rent received from municipal property.
- Funds from municipal bonds.

== List of Mayor ==
List of mayor's of Chandrapur Municipal Corporation (CMC).

| # | Name | Term | | | Election | Party |
|---|---|---|---|---|---|---|
| 1 | Sangita Amrutkar | 30 April 2012 | 30 October 2014 | 2 years, 183 days | 2012 | Indian National Congress |
| 2 | Rakhi Kancharlawar | 30 October 2014 | 30 April 2017 | 2 years, 182 days | 2012 | Bharatiya Janata Party |
| 3 | Anjali Ghotekar | 30 April 2017 | 22 November 2019 | 2 years, 206 days | 2017 | Bharatiya Janata Party |
| (2) | Rakhi Kancharlawar | 22 November 2019 | 30 April 2022 | 2 years, 159 days | 2017 | Bharatiya Janata Party |
| 4 | Sangeeta Khandekar | 10 February 2026 | Incumbent | 69 days | 2026 | Bharatiya Janata Party |

== List of Chairman, Standing Committee ==
- Ramu Tiwari
- Rahul Pawde

== Election results ==
=== 2026 results ===
The Municipal corporation elections were held on 15 January 2026 and the result was declared on 16 January 2026. The results of Election 2026 are as follows.

| Party | Seats |
|---|---|
| Indian National Congress (INC) | 27 |
| Bharatiya Janata Party (BJP) | 23 |
| Shiv Sena (UBT) | 6 |
| Bahujan Samaj Party (BSP) | 1 |
| Shiv Sena (SHS) | 1 |
| All India Majlis-e-Ittehadul Muslimeen | 1 |
| PWP | 3 |
| Other Regd. Parties | 2 |
| Independents (Ind) | 2 |
| Total | 66 |

=== 2017 results ===
The Municipal corporation elections were held on 19 April 2017 and the result was declared on 21 April 2017. The results of Election 2017 are as follows.

| Party | Seats | +/- |
|---|---|---|
| Bharatiya Janata Party (BJP) | 39 | ▲21 |
| Indian National Congress (INC) | 14 | ▼12 |
| Bahujan Samaj Party (BSP) | 6 | ▲5 |
| Shiv Sena (SHS) | 2 | ▼3 |
| Nationalist Congress Party (NCP) | 2 | ▼2 |
| Maharashtra Navnirman Sena (MNS) | 1 | Steady |
| Other Regd. Parties | 1 | Steady |
| Independents (Ind) | 1 | ▼9 |
| Total | 66 | |

=== 2012 results ===
The results of Election 2012 are as follows.

| Party | Seats |
|---|---|
| Indian National Congress (INC) | 26 |
| Bharatiya Janata Party (BJP) | 18 |
| Shiv Sena (SHS) | 5 |
| Nationalist Congress Party (NCP) | 4 |
| Bahujan Samaj Party (BSP) | 1 |
| Maharashtra Navnirman Sena (MNS) | 1 |
| Other Regd Parties | 1 |
| Independents (Ind) | 10 |
| Total | 66 |

== Administration ==
- Commissioner - Sanjay Kakade
- Additional Commissioner - Bhalchandra Behere

Deputy Commissioner 1 - Gajanan Bokade (In-charge)

Deputy Commissioner 2- Manoj Goswami (In-charge)

City Engineer - Mahesh Barai
