= Malegaon =

- City
- मालेगांव
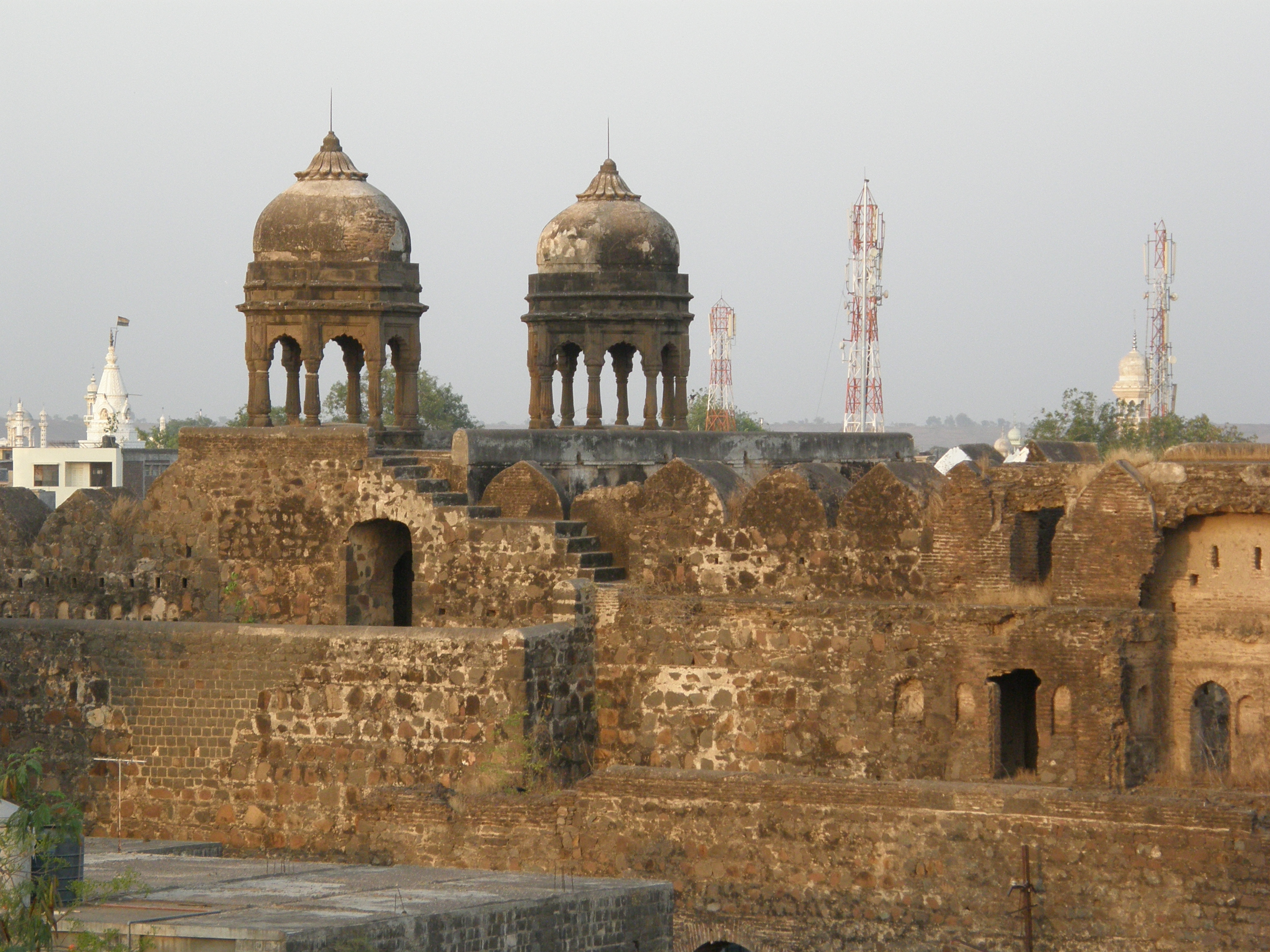
- Malegaon Fort
- Nickname: Textile City
- Interactive map of Malegaon
- Coordinates: 20.55°N 74.55°E
- Country: India
- State: Maharashtra
- District: Nashik

Government
  - Type: Municipal Corporation
  - Body: Malegaon Municipal Corporation
  - MLA: Dadaji Bhuse, Shivsena; Mohammed Ismail Abdul Khalique, AIMIM

Area
  - Total: 68 km^{2} (26 sq mi)
  - Rank: 26.25
- Elevation: 438 m (1,437 ft)

Population
  - Total: 481,228
- Demonym: Malegaonkar
- Time zone: UTC+5:30 (IST)
- PIN: 423203 (City and Soygaon) & 423105 (for Camp area)
- Vehicle registration: MH-41
- Official language: Marathi And Urdu
- Website: malegaonmahaulb.maharashtra.gov.in/en

Malegaon (IAST: Mālegāv; Pronunciation: [malegaːʋ]) is a city in Nashik District of Maharashtra State in India. It is situated on the bank of the Girna river with Mosam River river flowing through middle of the city dividing it in two parts. Malegaon is famous for its loom industries.

== History ==
On the road linking Mumbai and Agra – now National Highway-3 (NH3), it used to be a small junction known as Maliwadi (hamlet of gardeners).

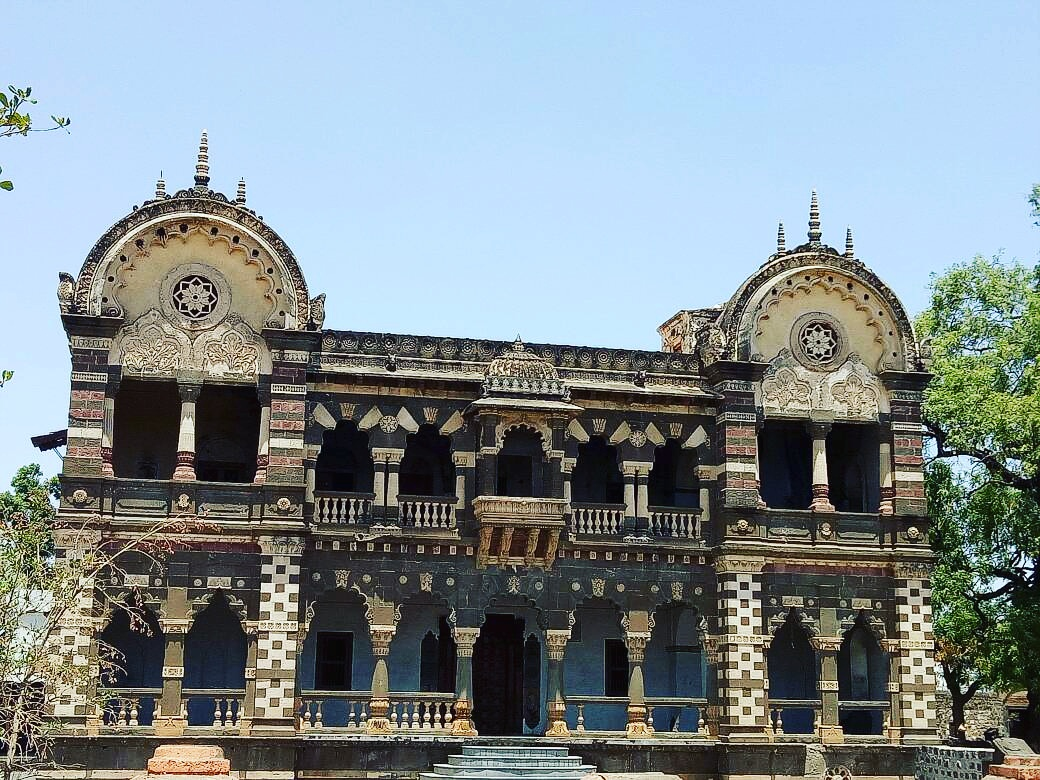
Sayaji Palace

Naro Shankar Raje Bahadur was appointed as an agent in Malwa. He was gifted 18 villages which included Malewadi. He constructed Malegaon Fort in 1740 using craftsmen from Surat and northern India, the construction of which took 25 years. After the fort was completed, the craftsmen settled in the town. Since long people have been immigrating to Malegaon after persecution. Post the COVID-19 pandemic, there has been faster growth in the city.

== Geography ==
Malegaon(previously Maligaon) is at the confluence of the Girna and Mosam (previously Moosy) rivers, at elevation of 438 metres (1437 feet) at 18.42°N 77.53°E.

It is 280 km northeast of the state capital Mumbai. It is centrally located and has good connectivity with nearby cities like Nashik, Pune, Mumbai, Indore, Surat, and Dhule. It is at 89.5 km (~ 1.45 hrs. drive) from nearest airport Nashik Airport.

Roads:

- State Highway 10 (Maharashtra)
- National Highway 3 (India, old numbering) (Asian Highway no. 10) (Mumbai - Agra)

=== Climate ===
Climate data for Malegaon (1991–2020, extremes 1901–2020)
Month	Jan	Feb	Mar	Apr	May	Jun	Jul	Aug	Sep	Oct	Nov	Dec	Year
Record high °C (°F)	36.4 (97.5)	41.0 (105.8)	45.6 (114.1)	45.6 (114.1)	46.7 (116.1)	44.4 (111.9)	39.4 (102.9)	37.2 (99.0)	39.0 (102.2)	40.9 (105.6)	39.4 (102.9)	36.8 (98.2)	46.7 (116.1)
Mean daily maximum °C (°F)	30.2 (86.4)	33.3 (91.9)	37.5 (99.5)	40.5 (104.9)	40.7 (105.3)	35.9 (96.6)	30.6 (87.1)	29.1 (84.4)	30.8 (87.4)	33.5 (92.3)	31.7 (89.1)	31.1 (88.0)	33.7 (92.7)
Mean daily minimum °C (°F)	10.2 (50.4)	12.1 (53.8)	16.2 (61.2)	20.2 (68.4)	23.2 (73.8)	23.4 (74.1)	22.7 (72.9)	21.8 (71.2)	21.0 (69.8)	18.6 (65.5)	14.7 (58.5)	11.1 (52.0)	18.1 (64.6)
Record low °C (°F)	0.6 (33.1)	−0.6 (30.9)	5.6 (42.1)	9.4 (48.9)	15.0 (59.0)	15.6 (60.1)	17.4 (63.3)	15.6 (60.1)	14.2 (57.6)	7.5 (45.5)	5.6 (42.1)	2.6 (36.7)	−0.6 (30.9)
Average rainfall mm (inches)	3.3 (0.13)	0.3 (0.01)	4.3 (0.17)	3.9 (0.15)	9.2 (0.36)	113.2 (4.46)	137.4 (5.41)	112.1 (4.41)	124.5 (4.90)	64.6 (2.54)	18.0 (0.71)	2.7 (0.11)	593.8 (23.38)
Average rainy days	0.4	0.1	0.3	0.5	0.9	5.9	7.8	7.0	6.3	2.8	0.9	0.3	33.2
Average relative humidity (%) (at 17:30 IST)	32	30	21	20	25	48	65	71	65	47	41	39	42
Source: India Meteorological Department

== Economy ==
Villages near Malegaon and towards Satana, Nampur, Sonaj, Talwade and Vadel are agricultural areas and major producers of onions. Pomegranate is another crop of commercial importance that is cultivated by farmers in nearby pockets. Krishi Vigyan Kendra (KVK) of Malegaon has a front office at Malegaon and a research farm at Vadel. There is also a campus of Mahatma Gandhi Vidyamandir's H. H. Sri Sri Murlidhara Swamiji College of Agriculture and H. H. Sri Sri Murlidhara Swamiji College of Horticulture in the Malegaon Camp area. There is also a cloth manufacturing industry mostly using power looms. Cloths made are also further processed in few plants or sold to merchants. Several plastic manufacturing companies are operational around city. Around 3 Buffalo meat processing and export units are present in Malegaon City. Post Covid-19 period, it is becoming a medical tourism hub. People are coming for treatment. Several outskirts are getting Farmhouses built for 1 day outing and rest. These farmhouses are equipped with swimming pools.

== Demographics ==
As of 2011 India census, Malegaon city had urban/metropolitan population of 481,228. Males constitute 51% of the population and females 49%. Malegaon has an average literacy rate of 70.54%: Male literacy is 74.25% and female literacy is 66.63%. About 15.41% of the population is under 6 years of age.

In Malegaon City Islam is the most practiced religion with approximately 379,927 (78.95%) following it. 89,011 (18.50%) of the population following Hindu religion. Buddhism is followed by 6,830 (1.42%) and Jainism 3,933 (0.82).

Year	Male	Female	Total Population	Change	Religion (%)							
Year	Male	Female	Total Population	Change	Hindu	Muslim	Christian	Sikhs	Buddhist	Jain	Other religions and persuasions	Religion not stated
2001	208864	200539	409403	-	20.975	75.382	0.253	0.109	2.128	1.056	0.071	0.026
2011	244080	237148	481228	0.175	18.497	78.949	0.105	0.042	1.419	0.817	0.020	0.151

Religion in Malegaon city (2011)
City	Population

== Education ==
Malegaon has a lot of schools and colleges. Night schools for elders, only Boys and only Girls schools, colleges offering diploma/degrees in Pharmacy, Education, Medicine, Management, etc. Language of instruction include urdu, marathi and english.

- The Malegaon High School and Junior College (AMT)
- Loknete Venkatrao Hire Academy
- Mansoora College
- Govt. College of Agribusiness Management Kashti Malegaon
- H.H.Sri Sri Muralidhara Swamiji College Of Agriculture
- Swami Vivekanand Sanstha'S Institute Of Pharmacy
- Dr. B.V. Hiray College of Management and Research Centre
- Maharaja Sayajirao Gaikwad Arts, Science & Commerce College
- Adinath English Medium School

== Covid-19 Malegaon Model ==
A epidemiological study by panel of doctors appointed by government was conducted to unearth the reasons behind super covid control in Malegaon and published in Asian Journal of Medical Sciences. News agencies captured the phenomenon. Indian Express published a story around this with title magic Malegaon project. Times of India also published a news article around this with title Malegaon success story.

During this testing and challenging time, local Unani Medical Doctors (BUMS) played a pivotal role. The Eastern Part of the City was sealed after the Covid outbreak. Doctors in Western Part of the City refused to admit the Covid positive patients. The Malegaon General Hospital had also closed its doors for Covid patients. At this crucial juncture Unani Medical Graduates took control of the Healthcare System of the City. Risking their life, they converted their small dispensaries to admit Covid patients, and went home to home to save them.

== Bomb blast ==
On 29 September 2008, three bombs exploded in the States of Gujarat and Maharashtra killing eight people and injuring 80, in that Two bombs went off in Malegaon. Three of the arrested suspects were identified as Sadhvi Pragya Singh Thakur, Shiv Narayan Gopal Singh Kalsanghra, and Shyam Bhawarlal Sahu. All three were produced before the Chief Judicial Magistrate's court in Nashik, which remanded them to custody till 3 November. On 28 October, the Shiv Sena, came out in support of the accused saying that the arrests were political in nature., Shiv Sena chief, Uddhav Thackeray, propounded a potential conflict of interest in political rivalry as the Nationalist Congress Party (NCP) controlled the relevant ministry. The National Investigation Agency (NIA) has found evidence against Sadhvi Pragya Singh Thakur and it has recommended the court to act against all charges against her which was proven incorrect.

The Indian Army officer Prasad Shrikant Purohit was also accused of being involved in the blast. July 2025 verdict by the special court in Mumbai acquitted all accused in the Malegaon blast case, including former BJP MP Pragya Singh Thakur and Lieutenant Colonel Prasad Purohit.

== MLA’s ==
MLAs from Malegaon Central Assembly constituency for Maharashtra Assembly:

- 1930: Gulab Miya Wasif, Indian National Congress [First MLA Before Independence]
- 1952: Mohammad Sabir Abdul Sattar, Indian National Congress (First MLA after independence)
- 1962: Haroon Ansari, Indian National Congress
- 1967: Nihal Ahmed Maulavi Mohammed Usman, Praja socialist
- 1972: Aysha Hakeem Saheba, Indian National Congress
- 1978: Nihal Ahmed Maulavi Mohammed Usman, Janata Party
- 1980: Nihal Ahmed Maulavi Mohammed Usman, Janata Party
- 1985: Nihal Ahmed Maulavi Mohammed Usman, Janata Party
- 1990: Nihal Ahmed Maulavi Mohammed Usman, Janata Dal(S)
- 1995: Nihal Ahmed Maulavi Mohammed Usman, Janata Dal(S)
- 1999: Shaikh Rasheed Haji Shaikh Shaffi, Indian National Congress
- 2004: Shaikh Rasheed Haji Shaikh Shaffi, Indian National Congress
- 2009: Mohammed Ismail Abdul Khalique, Jan Surajya Shakti
- 2014: Shaikh Aasif Shaikh Rashid, Indian National Congress
- 2019: Mohammed Ismail Abdul Khalique, All India Majlis-E-Ittehadul Muslimeen
- 2024: Mohammed Ismail Abdul Khalique, All India Majlis-E-Ittehadul Muslimeen

MLAs from Malegaon Outer Constituency for Maharashtra Assembly:

- 1978: Hiray Baliram Waman, INDIAN NATIONAL CONGRESS
- 1980: Hiray Baliram Waman, INDIAN NATIONAL CONGRESS
- 1985: Hiray Pushpatai Vyankatrao, INDIAN CONGRESS (SOCIALIST)
- 1990: Hiray Pushpatai Vyankatrao, Indian National Congress
- 1995: Hiray Pushpatai Vyankatrao, Indian National Congress
- 1999: Hire Prashant Venkatrao, Nationalist Congress Party
- 2004: Dadaji Bhuse, Independent
- 2009: Dadaji Bhuse, Shiv Sena
- 2014: Dadaji Bhuse, Shiv Sena
- 2019: Dadaji Bhuse, Shiv Sena
- 2024: Dadaji Bhuse, Shiv Sena
