= Nihal Ahmed Maulavi Mohammed Usman =

Indian politician

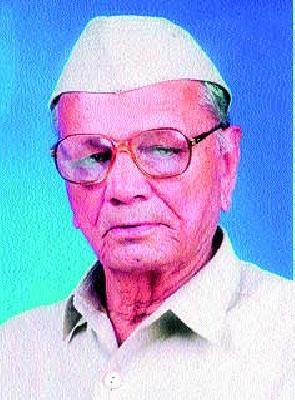
Image of Nihal Ahmad

Nihal Ahmed Maulavi Mohammed Usman, also known as Nihal Sahab or Sathi Nihal Ahmed or Nihalbhai, was an Indian socialist leader and politician belonging to Janata Dal (Secular). He was a former Minister of government of Maharashtra and legislator of the Maharashtra Legislative Assembly from 1960 until 1999. He was also the first mayor of the Malegaon Municipal Corporation. He died on 29 February 2016 at a private hospital in Nashik at the age of 90 following age-related ailments. He had been admitted to the hospital the night before due to respiratory problems. He was laid to rest at the Bada Kabrasthan burial ground later that night. He was survived by his wife, four sons and three daughters.

In 2002, Nihal received controversy due to organising a procession at Malegaon in 2001 to protest against the US attack on Afghanistan. Nonetheless, he was elected the first Mayor of Malegaon.
