= Malegaon Municipal Corporation =

Local civic body in Malegaon, Maharashtra, India

Type
- Type: Municipal Corporation of the Malegaon

Leadership
- Mayor: Sheikh Nasreen Khalid, ISLAM
- Deputy Mayor: Nihal Ahmed, SP
- Municipal Commissioner: Ravindra Jadhav, IAS

Structure
- Seats: 84
- Political groups: Government (43): ISLAM (35); SP (5); INC (3); Opposition (41): AIMIM (21); SHS (18); BJP (2)

Elections
- Last election: 15 January 2026
- Next election: 2031

Website
- malegaoncorporation.org

The Malegaon Municipal Corporation is the governing body of the city of Malegaon in the Indian state of Maharashtra. The municipal corporation consists of democratically elected members, is headed by a mayor and administers the city's infrastructure, public services and police. Members from the state's major various political parties hold elected offices in the corporation. Malegaon Municipal Corporation has been formed with functions to improve the infrastructure of town. Municipal Corporation mechanism in India was introduced during British Rule with formation of municipal corporation in Madras (Chennai) in 1688, later followed by municipal corporations in Bombay (Mumbai) and Calcutta (Kolkata) by 1762.

== Revenue sources ==
The following are the Income sources for the corporation from the Central and State Government.

=== Revenue from taxes ===
Following is the Tax related revenue for the corporation.

- Property tax.
- Profession tax.
- Entertainment tax.
- Grants from Central and State Government like Goods and Services Tax.
- Advertisement tax.

=== Revenue from non-tax sources ===
Following is the Non Tax related revenue for the corporation.

- Water usage charges.
- Fees from Documentation services.
- Rent received from municipal property.
- Funds from municipal bonds.

== List of Mayor ==
S.No.	Name	Term			Party
1	Nihal Ahmed Usman	15 June 2002	18 February 2005	2 years, 248 days	
2	Asif Sheikh Rashid	18 February 2005	15 July 2007	2 years, 147 days	
3	Najmuddin Sheikh Gulsher	15 June 2007	15 December 2009	2 years, 183 days	
4	A. Malik Mo. Yunus	15 December 2009	14 June 2012	2 years, 182 days	
5	Tahera Sheikh Rashid	15 June 2012	15 December 2014	2 years, 183 days	
6	Haji Mo. Ibrahim Haji Mo. Yasin	13 December 2014	15 June 2017	2 years, 184 days	
7	Sheikh Rashid Sheikh Shafi	15 June 2017	14 December 2019	2 years, 182 days	
8	Tahera Sheikh Rashid	15 December 2019	13 June 2022	2 years, 180 days	
9	Sheikh Nasreen Khalid	7 February 2026	Incumbent	82 days	ISLAM

== List of Deputy Mayor ==
#	Name	Term		Party
1	Nihal Ahmed	7 February 2026	82 days	SP

== Corporation Election 2026 ==
=== Political Performance in Election 2026 ===
Party			Seats
Flag	Name	Symbol	Won
	Indian Secular Largest Assembly of Maharashtra		35
	All India Majlis-e-Ittehadul Muslimeen		21
	Shiv Sena (SHS)		18
	Samajwadi Party		5
	Indian National Congress		3
	Bharatiya Janata Party		2
Total			84

=== Mayor & Deputy Mayor Voting Results ===
Post	Winner	Party	Votes Polled	Opponent	Party	Votes Polled
Mayor	Sheikh Nasreen Khalid	ISLAM	43	Lata Ghodke	Shiv Sena	18
Deputy Mayor	Nihal Ahmed	SP	43	Adv. Nilesh Kakde	Shiv Sena	18

=== Voting Notes ===
- Support for the winners came from:
  - Indian Secular Largest Assembly of Maharashtra (35)
  - Samajwadi Party (5)
  - Indian National Congress (3)
- AIMIM and BJP abstained from voting.

== Corporation Election 2017 ==
=== Political Performance in Election 2017 ===
Malegaon Municipal Corporation elections were conducted in May 2017.

S.No.	Party name	Party flag or symbol	Number of Corporators
01	Indian National Congress (INC)		28
02	Nationalist Congress Party (NCP)		20
03	Shiv Sena (SS)		12
04	Bhartiya Janata Party (BJP)		09
05	All India Majlis-e-Ittehadul Muslimeen		07
06	Janata Dal (Secular)		07

== Corporation Election 2012 ==
=== Political Performance in Election 2012 ===
S.No.	Party name	Party flag or symbol	Number of Corporators
01	Indian National Congress (INC)		25
02	Nationalist Congress Party (NCP)		22
03	Shiv Sena (SS)		11
04	Maharashtra Navnirman Sena (MNS)		02
05	Other State Parties		05
06	Other Registered Parties		20
07	Independents		09
