= Karjat =

Place in Raigad (Maharashtra), India

- Town; Mumbai Metropolitan Region
- Location in the Maharashtra Location in India
- Coordinates: 18.9167°N 73.33°E
- Country: India
- State: Maharashtra
- District: Raigad
- Taluka: Karjat

Government
  - Body: Karjat Municipal Council
  - President (Mayor): Smt. Pushpa tai Dagade
  - Municipal Council Chief Officer: Shri.
  - MLA: Mahendra Thorve (Karjat constituency)
- Demonym: Karjatkar

Language
  - Official: Marathi
- Time zone: UTC+5:30 (IST)
- PIN: 410201
- Telephone code: 02148
- Vehicle registration: MH-46, MH-06

Karjat (Pronunciation: [kəɾd͡zət̪]) is a city administered under a Municipal Council in the Raigad district of Maharashtra, India. It forms a part of the Mumbai Metropolitan Region and is located approximately 100 km (62 mi) from both Mumbai and Pune. The city is served by Karjat railway station and the Ulhas River flows through it. The city falls under the189 Karjat Assembly constituency.

== Demographics ==
In the 2011 Indian census, Karjat had a population of 29,663. Males constituted 51% of the population and females 49%. The literacy rate in Karjat was 88.38%, higher than the state average of 82.34%. In Karjat, male literacy is around 91.65% while the female literacy rate is 84.94%. Population of Children with an age of 0-6 is 3039 which is 10.25% of the total population.

Religion in Karjat (2011)
Religion	Percent
Hinduism	79.17%
Buddhism	9.68%
Islam	6.71%
Jainism	3.08%
Christianity	1.17%
Others	0.20%
