= Jethwa dynasty =

Indian dynasty

- 620–1948
- Capital: Mayurpuri (Morvi), Shrinagar, Dhank, Chhaya, Ghumli, Ranapur, Porbandar
- Common languages: Sanskrit, Prakrit, Old Gujarati,
- Religion: Hinduism
- Government: Monarchy
- History
  - Established: 620
  - Disestablished: 1948
Preceded by	Succeeded by
Saindhava dynasty	Dominion of India
- Today part of: India

Jethwa dynasty was a dynasty that ruled over present day Gujarat region of India from 7th century AD till middle of 20th century, when India became independent. It was a Rajput dynasty ruled by Jethwa clan of Rajputs.

== Origin ==
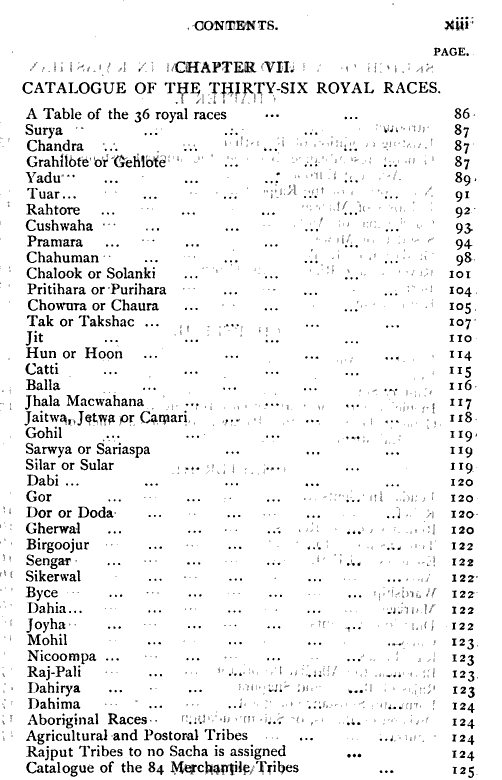
Tod's 1829 listing of the 36 royal races mentions Jaitwa, Jethwa also as Camari

Jethwa (or Jethva, Jatava, Jaitwa or Camari,. The Jethwa claim their descent from Makardhwaja, son of Hanuman. As per folk tales of their clan, Makardhwaja had a son named Mod-dhwaja and he had a son named Jethi-dhwaja. Jethwas claim descent and name from Jethi-dhwaja and worship Hanuman as their Iṣṭa-devatā.

Image of Merchant Navy flag of Princely State of Porbandar adopted by Jethwa rulers of the Kingdom, showing image of Hanuman, from whom the Jethwas claim their descant.

Jethwa dynasty of Porbandar, therefore, had image of Hanuman on the Merchant Navy Flag adapted in 1923. Also the Coat of Arms had the image of Hanuman in the centre.

Further, it is said that Muslim governors of Sindh in 7th century repeatedly sent naval armed ships to conquer the western and southern coast of Gujarat, which were again and again repulsed by the "Saindhavas" who called themselves "masters of the Western sea" Apara Samudradhipati (apara-samudr-ddhipati) . It has been suggested that the Saindhava ruling family also known as Jayadrathas is now represented by the Jethwa Rajputs.

Captain Wilberforce Bell opines that their ancestors were probably Scythians from the north. However, Gaurishankar Ojha opines Jethwas were probably a branch of Pratihars of Kannauj.

Further, many historians are of a view that Jethwa Rajputs have deep association with Mer people since time immemorial, who are only the Senior (Jethwa) or rajakula (royal clan) of the Mers. The Mer have always been confidential and supported Jethwas in times of war and peace. It was the custom that when a Rana of Porbandar ascended the throne or Gaddi, the leader of the Mer people would cut the tip of his little finger and make a tilak with his blood on the forehead of the Rana.

== History ==
Ghumali, which was earlier capital of Saindhvas has been Jethwa's bastion and capital since the time dynasty was founded in early 7th Century around 620 by Shil Kumar Jethwa, who later helped Angagapala ruler of Delhi win a war. In return of the help Anagapal married her daughter with him. The area ruled by Jethwa's was traditionally today known as Barda Hills was historically known as Jyeshthukadesh, meaning land of Jethwa's. The other towns founded by them are where they shifted their capital temporarily after dislodged from Morvi in 900 AD, were with times shifting to Shrinagar, Dhank, Chhaya, Ghumli, Ranapur and lastly to Porbandar (from 1685 till 1947). They were the first rulers of the Saurashtra area of Western Gujarat.

Jethwas seem to have entered from North West, that is, Sindh and Kutch to Saurashtra in the 9th century AD and are oldest ruling clan of Peninsula. It is accepted by almost all historians that Jethwas established their rule in Saurashtra in around 900 AD and founded the city of Morvi as their Capital. Morvi was earlier known by name of Mayurpuri, named after its founder the Jethwa ruler Mayur-dhwaja. They spread further westward and captured Dwarka from Chawdas moved further and established the towns of Nagnah, Ghumli, Bhanvad, Chhaya, Dhank, Laodhva, Ranpur with colonies at Miani and Shrinagar on the coast. During the time of Mahmud of Ghazni, the Jethwas controlled all the west and north of the Kathiawar.

Colonial ethnographer James Tod in his 1832 The annals and antiquities of Rajastʾhan:or the central and western Rajpoot states of India includes Jethwa among the 36 royal races of ancient India and also names Jethwa or Jatava as Camari. Further, Colon James Todd opines that Jethwas come from old marital races of Indian Peninsula and were called Kanwar till the 8th century. Some Jethwa rulers suffixed Kanwar after their name and hence were also known as Kanwars or Kumars.

Sangaji was a Jethwa ruler from 1120 to 1150, who defeated the army of Virdhaval Vaghela, (the founder of Vaghela dynasty) near Morvi in 1125. Virdhaval, defeated, married his daughter and surrendered his title of Rana to Sangaji Jethwa. The title of Rana has been held by Jethwas rulers ever-since till last Rana died in 1979 without an heir.

Jethwas lost Morvi, when they were defeated by invading army of Qutb-ud-din Aibak in year 1193. Jethwas shifted to Nagnah and they later established their rule and founded Ghumli, under Sal Kumar. The rulers of Ghumli were also called Kumarants.

In later years Vajesinh Jethwa alias Wajosinh, who ruled from years 1220–1245, was a brave warrior, who was truly known as Sinh and held considerable influence on Vishaldeo Vaghela.

Ghumli was declared as second Capital by Jethwa dynasty, in 1220 by Rana Shiyaji, who took the title of Rana of Ghumli and shifted capital from Shrinagar Ghumli remained their Capital till 1313, when Rana Bhanji Jethwa, was defeated at a war, he fled Ghumli & shifted to Ranpur. It is said that Ghumli was destroyed due to curse of a Sati named Sone with whom Rana Bhanji Jethwa fell in love. Jadeja Jam Unaji (Jam Unad) of Jadeja clan came from Sindh and attacked Ghumli in 1309 but was defeated later in 1313 his son Jam Barmaniyaji Jadeja (Jam Bamanioji) attacked to avenge the defeat. He defeated Rana Bhanji Jethwa, who fled and Ghumli was completely destroyed and turned it into ruins. On the same night Goddess Ambaji came in dream of Bamanioji and told him that, as she has granted the wish ("Asha") of his father to conquer Ghumli, he should make a temple in her name. So Barmaniyaji built the Temple of Ambaji on the hill in the middle of Ghumli and named it as Ashapura Mata Temple, who is Kuldevi of Jedejas.

In around 1525–35 Jam Raval conquered greater part of Halar from Jethwas and other Rajput rulers like Chawdas, Dedas (A sub-branch of Jadejas) and Vadhels. This led to further decimating the Jethwa territories in which Nagnah was lost, which Jams renamed as Nawanagar. Jam Ravalji's son, however, gave his daughter to Jethwa ruler Khimooji. But in later years, Jam Ravaljis's son Jam Sataji killed his own nephew Jethwa Ramdevji IV by a conspiracy and annexed further territory of Jethwas by force. This led to a fierce enmity between Jethwa and Jams, which continued for 300 years and there was apiya between them. During this turbulent times in history of Jethwa dynasty, the Mers again came in help of in protection of Jethwas and helped them recover their lost territories. After the defeat at hands of Jams in 1525 the ruling Jethwa had to run from here to there till they found shelter at Chhaya. Later, the late Rana Bhanji's widow Rani Kalabai, a lady of out-standing courage and foresight raised an army of the Mers and Rabaris and regained her lost territory as far as Ranpur from Jams.

Later in 1671 Rana Vikmatji Khimoji Jethwa took possession of Porbandar from Mughals and built a fort there. He also took fort of Madhavpur. Though, he died at Porbandar, the capital remained Chhaya. It was his son Rana Saratanji II, who permanently shifted the Capital to Porbandar in 1685. The Jethwas of Porbandar entered into alliance with British in 1807 and agreement was entered into year 1809 with East India Company.

The princely state of Porbandar was a 13-Gun Salute State of British India. The reigns of Rana Bhavsinhji Madhavsinhji (1900–1908) and Rana Natwarsinhji (1908–1979) both Maharaja of Porbandar gave the state of Porbandar first class status after many battles for the throne within the royal family in 1811, 1869 and 1886. The Porbandar remained the Capital of Jethwa dynasty till the State of Porbandar was merged into Union of India, when the last ruler of the kingdom, Rana Natwarsinhji Bhavsinhji signed the Instrument of Accession on 15 August 1947.

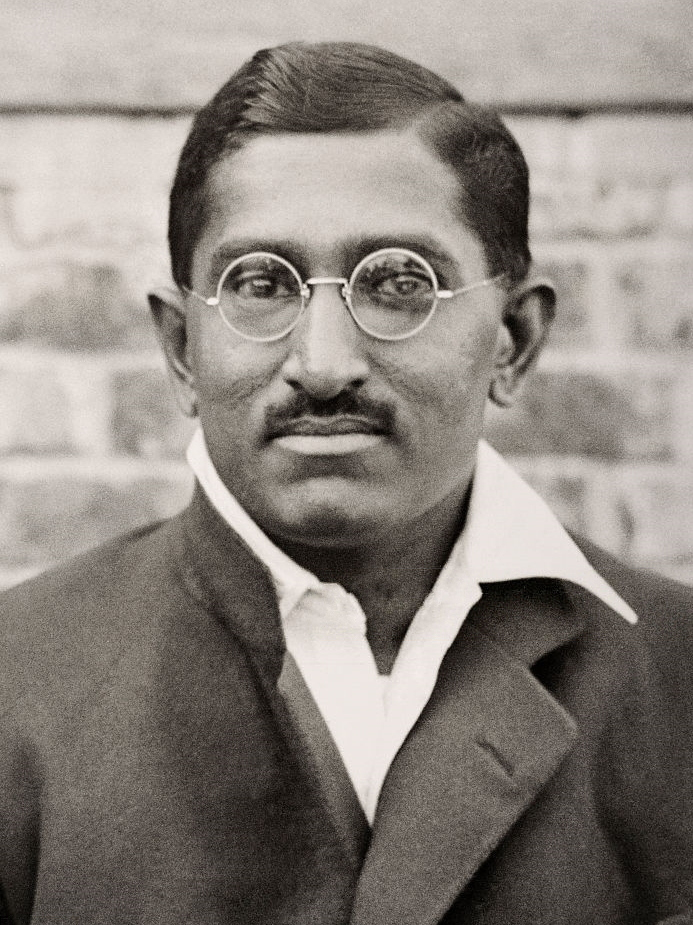
Lieutenant-Colonel Maharaja Rana Shri Sir Natwarsinhji Bhavsinhji Sahib Bahadur, KCSI, Maharaja of Porbandar - the last ruler of Jethwa dynasty.

The last Rana and ruler of Jethwa dynasty of Porbandar, Shri Natwarsinhji died in 1979. Before him in 1977, the successor to his throne the crown-prince Udaybhansinhji Natwarsinhji Jethwa died, leaving the throne vacant.

The grandfather of Mohandas Karamchand Gandhi, Uttamchand Gandhi and later his father – Karamchand Gandhi and uncle – Tulsidas Gandhi, served as Dewan to Rana of Porbandar.

== Jethwa inscriptions ==
=== Visavada inscription ===
The inscription dated VS 1262 (1206 CE) was found in a niche of Siddhanatha Mahadeva Temple in Visavada near Porbandar. Written by Nagar Brahmin named Vaijaka and engraved by mason Jhalhana, it says about installation of a statue of Vikramaditya in the reign of Rana Simha. This Rana Simha probably belonged to Jethwa family as according to the bards the region was held by the Jethwas during that period.

== Architectural heritage ==
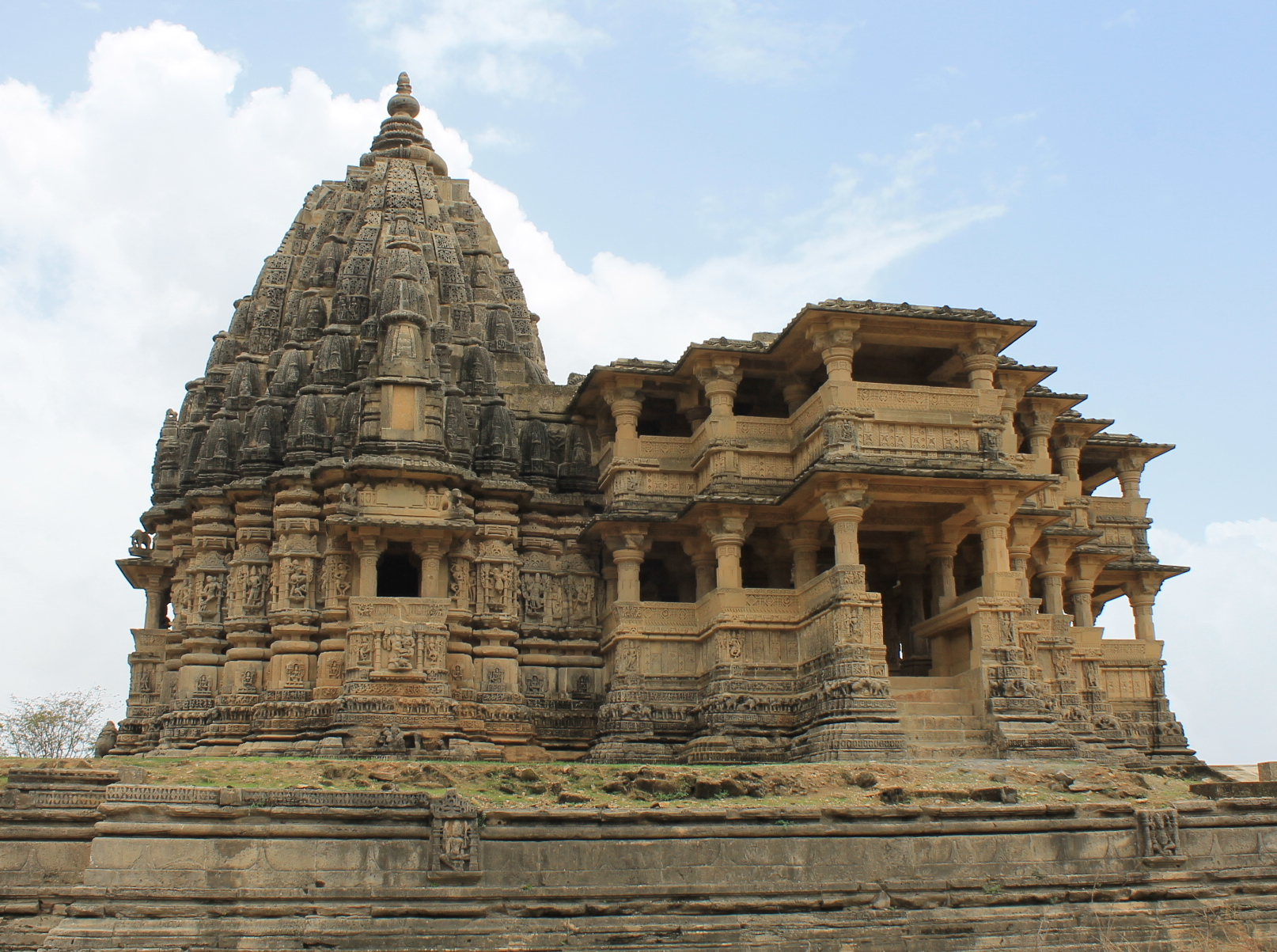
The view of Navlakha Temple at Ghumli built by Jethwa dynasty in 12th century, after restoration work done by ASI.

- Navlakha Temple at Ghumli built by Jethwa rulers in the 12th century dedicated to Sun god is oldest sun temple of Gujarat. It has the largest base (Uagati) of the temples in Gujarat, measuring 45.72 x 30.48 m. Facing East, it had a beautiful entrance arch or Kirti Toran, that is now lost. The sanctum sanctorum (garbhagriha), covered pradakshina path, large gathering hall and its three shringar chokis are eye catching. On the surrounding walking path we find three directions with balconies. The mandapa has eight-sided pillars for support. In the small niches we find sculptures. The entrances are two storied. At the back wall of the temple we find two huge elephants fighting with their trunks. In Bhadra gavaksha is the image of Brahma-Savitri, in the west is the Shiva-Parvati, to the north is LakshmiNarayan. The Navlakha Temple built at a cost of Nine Lacs hence the name rivals the Somnath Temple in its architect and interiors. The temple is built in the Solanki style of architecture have the three entwining tusks of elephants as its trademark and is considered to be high noon of Solanki style of architect.
- Kileshwar Mahadev temple built on Barda Hill near Ghumli.
- Vikia Vav, a stepwell is the oldest and one of the biggest stepwells of Gujarat built by Jethwa ruler Vikiaji after whom it is named. This ruined step-well is one of the largest of its kind in the state, measuring almost 60 by 40.5 sq m. The well has numerous flights of steps leading up to it and string-coursed carvings. The entrance pavilions can still be seen standing intact at three places.
- Jetha Step well, similar to Vikia step well near Ghumali.
- Bhan Gate named after Bhan Jethwa near Ghumali Navlakha Temple and Rampol Gate at Ghumali.
- Ghumali Ganesha Temple at Ghumli
- Darbargarh, the palace of Jethwas at Chhaya built around 1600.
- Darbargarh at Porbandar was built by Rana Sartanji Jethwa (1671–1699) in end of the 17th century. This palace has a huge carved stone entrance gate flanked by high turrets and massive wooden doors. It is a typical example of such royal enclosures situated within the town of Gujarat. The fort has several bastions, 3 small gates (baris) and 4 main gates. The main gates are Porbandar gate in the west, Kathiawar Darwaja in the east, Halar Gate in the North and Junagadh gate in the south. Darbargadh is designed to resemble a jewel box, in the architectural style of the Navlakha palace situated at Gondal.
- Sartanji Choro at Porbandar :Rana Sartanji (1671–1699) also built Sartanji Choro, the three storied summer pavilion. This palace was built in the Rajput style as a retreat in the middle of the garden. Each side of the garden represent a different reason. It is also known as Grishmabhuvan.

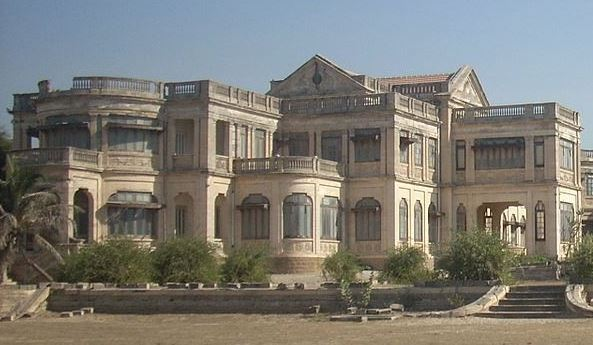
The Huzoor Palace standing on sea shore of Porbandar city, built by last ruler of Jethwa dynasty Maharana Natwarsinhji in the early 20th century

- Daria Mahal Palace is located at the end of Marine Drive on sea shore of Porbandar city, in a huge campus. It was built in the late 19th century by Rana Bhavsinhji Madhavsinhji. Standing on the edge of the Arabian Sea the palace shows the influences of the Arabian culture. However, some parts of the palace are Italianate in style with an interesting blend of Renaissance and Gothic touch. The interiors of the palace like chandeliers, painted murals and the European furniture are eye catching. The palace has now been converted into a college.
- Huzoor Mahal Palace was built by Rana Natwarsinhji also on sea shore of Probandar city. This sprawling palace is built in the European style with sloping roofs, several wings and big windows, overlooking the sea.
- Anut Nivas at Khambalia, overlooking the dam, is a summer palace built on Barda hills built by last ruler of Porbandar State, Rana ShriNatawarsinhji in 1927. The interior is lavish but not ostentatious. The Rajput Room is a museum of Kathiawad's past.
- The Lal Mahal or Red Palace in Porbandar, previously official guest house of the rulers of Porbandar State, now lies closed.

== In folklore ==
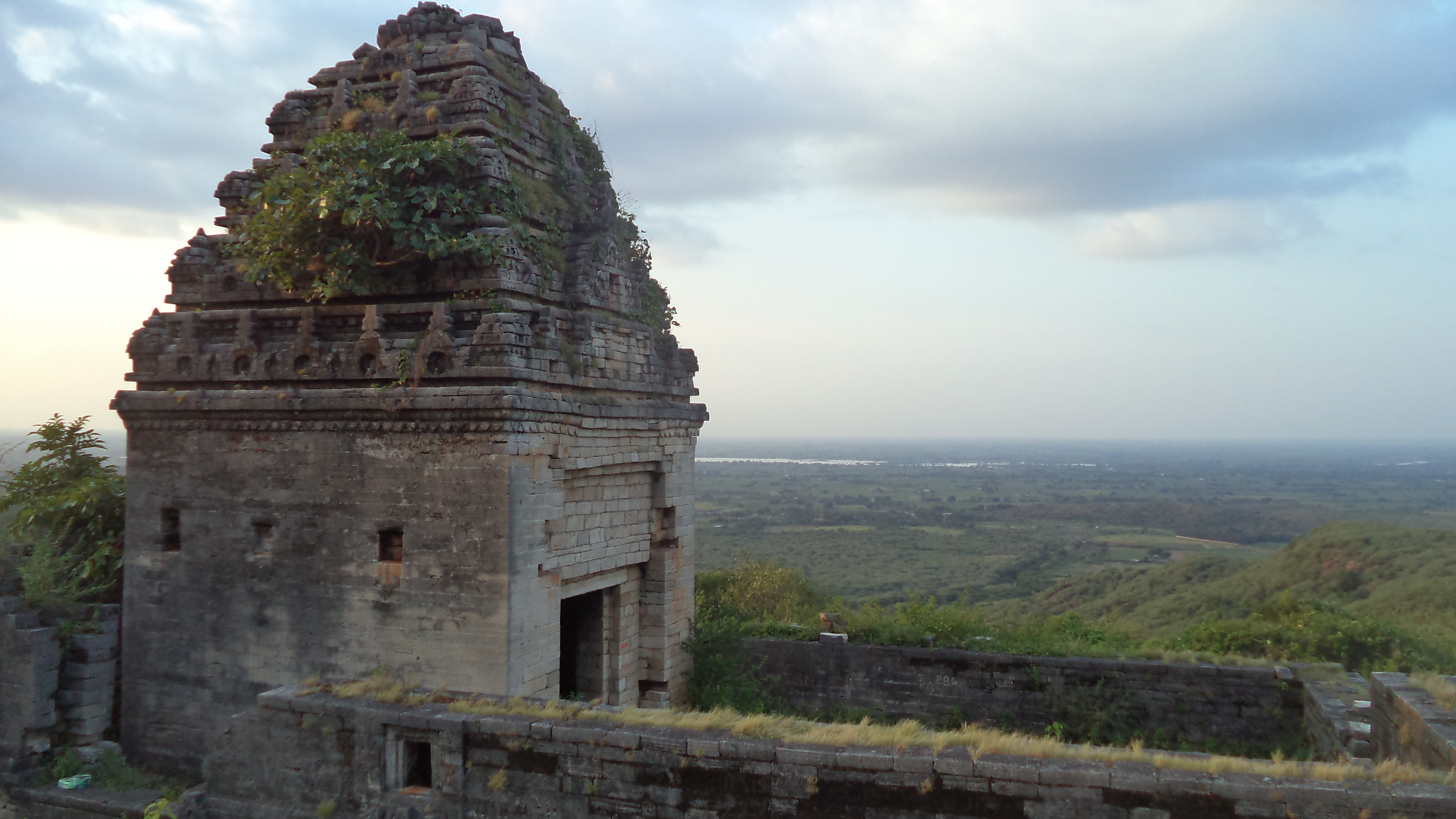
Temple of Son Kasari, built in memory of Sati Son in early 14th Century, stands in depleted state at Bhanvad.

The bardic tales of Jethwas are immortalised in folk tales like Rajasthani folk tale of immortal love between Jethwa and Ujali and heroic tales of Bhan Jethwa and Vijo related to defeat of Kathis by them, in which the names of Jethwa territories of Bhanvad and Lodhva are mentioned in bardic folk-songs of Kathiawar. Also the bardic songs of Bhan Jethwa, who fell in love with Son Kansari, who was in love with Rakhayata Babaria, his commander. Bhan got Rakhayat murdered by his servant Kumbha. Son became a Sati cursing that Ghumli will be destroyed in due course of time. Her prophecy came true when Ghumli was demolished by Jams in 1313. The Brahmins of Baradiya, who gave her shelter and many of whom also died for the cause of protecting Son, later built a temple in memory Sati Son, which now stands in depleted condition on a hill top.
