= Medieval India =

Period of Indian history

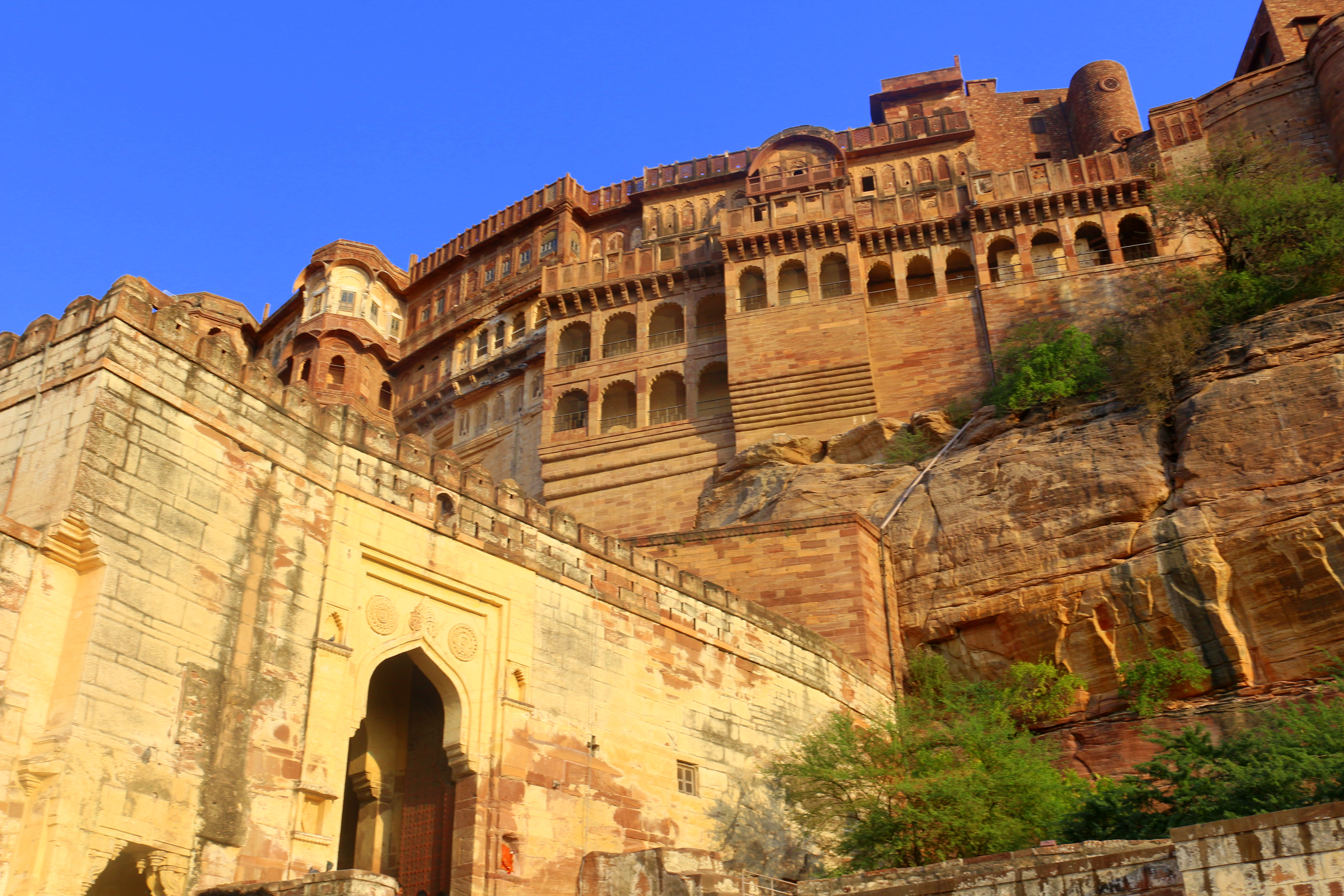
The Mehrangarh Fort was built in medieval India during the reign of Jodha of Mandore

Medieval India was a long period of post-classical history in the Indian subcontinent between the ancient and modern periods. It is usually regarded as running approximately from the break-up of the Gupta Empire in the 6th century to the start of the early modern period in 1526 with the start of the Mughal Empire, although some historians regard it as both starting and finishing later than these points. The medieval period is itself subdivided into the early medieval and late medieval eras.

In the early medieval period, there were more than 40 different states on the Indian subcontinent, which hosted a variety of cultures, languages, writing systems, and religions. At the beginning of the time period, Buddhism was predominant throughout the area, with the Pala Empire on the Indo Gangetic Plain sponsoring the Buddhist faith's institutions. One such institution was the Buddhist Nalanda mahavihara in modern-day Bihar, a centre of scholarship which brought a divided South Asia onto the global intellectual stage. Another accomplishment was the invention of Chaturanga, which later was exported to Europe and became chess. In Southern India, the Tamil Hindu, the Cholas gained prominence. In this time period, neighbouring regions such as Afghanistan, Tibet, and Southeast Asia were under South Asian influence.

During the late medieval period, a series of Islamic invasions by the Arabs, the Ghaznavids and the Ghurids conquered large portions of Northern India. Turkic general Qutb ud-Din Aibak declared his independence from the Ghurid Empire and founded the Delhi Sultanate which ruled until the 16th century. As a consequence, Buddhism declined in South Asia, but Hinduism survived and reinforced itself in areas conquered by Muslim empires. In the far South, the Vijayanagara Empire resisted Muslim conquests, sparking a long rivalry with the Bahmani Sultanate. The turn of the 16th century would see the introduction of gunpowder and the rise of a new Muslim empire — the Mughals — as well as the establishment of European trading posts by the Portuguese colonists. The Mughal Empire was one of the three Islamic gunpowder empires, along with the Ottoman Empire and Safavid Persia. The subsequent cultural and technological developments transformed Indian society, concluding the late medieval period and beginning the early modern period.

== Terminology and periodisation ==
One definition includes the period from the 6th century, the first half of the 7th century, or the 8th century up to the 16th century, essentially coinciding with the Middle Ages of Europe. It may be divided into two periods: The 'early medieval period' which lasted from the 6th to the 13th century and the 'late medieval period' which lasted from the 13th to the 16th century, ending with the start of the Mughal Empire in 1526. The Mughal era, from the 16th century to the 18th century, is often referred to as the early modern period, but is sometimes also included in the 'late medieval' period.

An alternative definition, often seen in those more recent authors who still use the term, brings the start of the medieval times forward: either to about 1000 CE, or to the 12th century. The end may be pushed back to the 18th century; hence, this period can be effectively considered as the beginning of Muslim domination to British India. Or the "early medieval" period as beginning in the 8th century, and ending with the 11th century. However, such periodisation has been criticized, with Ram Sharan Sharma arguing in his 1998 Early Medieval Indian Society that periodization based primarily on eras of religious dominance misses the actual events causing change in Indian history; he asserts a transition to the middle ages is better understood in the context of a shift towards a land grant-based system of rule in response to a "crisis" of develoving state authority and caste adherence.

The use of "medieval" at all as a term for periods in Indian history has often been objected to. It is probably becoming more rare (there is a similar discussion in terms of the history of China). It is argued that neither the start nor the end of the period really mark fundamental changes in Indian history, comparable to the European equivalents. Burton Stein still used the concept in his A History of India (1998), referring to the period from the Guptas to the Mughals, but most recent authors using it are Indian. Understandably, they often specify the period they cover within their titles.

== Periods ==
=== Early medieval period ===
Fragmented South Asian polities circa 600 CE, after the retreat of the Alchon Huns and the disintegration of the Gupta Empire.

The start of the period is typically taken to be the slow collapse of the Gupta Empire from about 480 to 550, ending the "classical" period, as well as "ancient India", although both these terms may be used for periods with widely different dates, especially in specialised fields such as the history of art or religion. Another alternative for the preceding period is "Early Historical" stretching "from the sixth century BC to the sixth century AD", according to Romila Thapar.

At least in northern India, there was no larger state until the Delhi Sultanate, or certainly the Mughal Empire, but there were several different dynasties ruling large areas for long periods, as well as many other dynasties ruling smaller areas, often paying some form of tribute to larger states. John Keay puts the typical number of dynasties within the subcontinent at any one time at between 20 and 40, not including local rajas.

- Pallava dynasty, rulers of Telugu and some Tamil areas from the 3rd to 9th centuries.
- Empire of Harsha, a brief period of control of most of north India, from 601 to 647, under Harsha of the Vardhana dynasty.
- Gurjara-Pratihara dynasty was the last largest dynasty of northern India which rivalled the Gupta empire in extent and ruled a large swath of northern India from the 6th century to 11th century. They can be differentiated from other kingdoms as they were called Imperial Pratiharas.
- Chalukya dynasty ruled most of the western Deccan and some parts of South India, between the 6th and 12th centuries. Kannada-speaking, with capital at Badami.
- Rashtrakuta dynasty, ruled large parts of the Indian subcontinent between the 6th and 10th centuries and built the World Heritage site of Ellora, Maharashtra.
- Eastern Chalukyas, 7th and 12th centuries, a South Indian dynasty whose kingdom was located in present-day Andhra Pradesh, with their capital at Vengi.
- Kingdom of Valabhi ruled by Maitraka dynasty, which was founded after decline of Gupta Empire, it controlled whole of Gujarat and areas beyond from 5th century to 8th century. They were succeeded by Saindhavas.
- Saindhava later known as Jethwa dynasty ruled from 7th century large parts of Saurahtra and controlled western coast of Gujarat for many years before their territory was reduced to Porbandar State which merged into India in 1947.
- Pala Empire, the last major Buddhist rulers, from the 8th to 12th centuries in Bengal. Briefly controlled most of north India in the 9th century.
- Chola Empire, a South Indian empire which ruled from Tamil Nadu and extending to neighbouring states. Also conducted raids on Southeast Asian kingdoms at its height. Ruled from the 9th century to 13th century.
- Western Chalukya Empire, ruled most of the western Deccan and some of South India, between the 10th and 12th centuries. Kannada-speaking, with capital at Badami.
- Kalachuri dynasty, ruled areas in Central India during 10th-12th centuries.
- Nagvanshis of Chotanagpur, ruled Chotanagpur plateau in Jharkhand.
- Western Ganga dynasty, was an important ruling dynasty of ancient Karnataka, often under the overlordship of larger states, from about 350 to 1000 CE. The large monolithic Bahubali of Shravanabelagola was built during their rule.
- Eastern Ganga dynasty, was a royal dynasty ruling Odisha region who ruled from 11th to 15th century and have marital alliances with Chalukyas and Chola Empire. They have built famous Konark Sun Temple and Jagannath Temple, Puri.
- Hoysala Empire, a prominent South Indian Kannadiga empire that ruled most of the modern day state of Karnataka between the 10th and the 14th centuries. The capital of the Hoysalas was initially located at Belur but was later moved to Halebidu.
- Kakatiya Kingdom, a Telugu dynasty that ruled most of current day Andhra Pradesh and Telangana.
- Kamarupa, 4th to 12th century in Assam, ruled by three dynasties viz Varman dynasty, Mlechchha dynasty, Pala dynasty (Kamarupa).
- Sena dynasty, 11th to 13th century in Bengal, following the decline of Pala Empire

=== Late medieval period ===
South Asian polities, c. 1250 CE.

This period follows the Muslim conquests of the Indian subcontinent and the decline of Buddhism, the eventual founding of the Delhi Sultanate and the creation of Indo-Islamic architecture, followed by the world's major trading nation, the Bengal Sultanate.

- Cutch 1176-1947, founded by Jadejas in early 12th century remained till 1947. The branches of these dynasty founded other kingdoms like Nawanagar State, Rajkot State, Morvi State and remained a dominant force in Kutch and Saurashtra region till merger with India after 1947.
- Bengal Sultanate, 1352 to 1576, ruled over Bengal and much of Burma.
- Khandesh Sultanate under Farooqi dynasty, 1382–1601, in the region of Khandesh
- Jaunpur Sultanate, 1394–1479, in northern India
- Gujarat Sultanate, 1407–1573, in the state of Gujarat.
- Malwa Sultanate, 1392–1562, in the region of Malwa
- Bahmani Sultanate, 1347–1518, in the Deccan region.
- Madurai Sultanate, 1335–1378, in South India..
- Chero dynasty, ruled from the 12th to 18th century, governed over parts of eastern Uttar Pradesh, Bihar and Jharkhand.
- Pithipatis of Bodh Gaya, Buddhist rulers of Magadha with their capital in Bodh Gaya. Ruled from 1120 until the late 13th century.
- Khayaravala dynasty, tribal state and vassals of the Gahadavala dynasty which ruled parts of south western Bihar from the 11-13th century.
- Delhi Sultanate, five short-lived dynasties, based in Delhi, from 1206 to 1526, when it fell to the Mughal Empire.
- Karnats of Mithila, 1097–1324 in the Mithila region of North Bihar and Southern Nepal
- Oiniwar dynasty, 1325–1526 in the Mithila region and successors of the Karnats of Mithila
- Khanzadas of Mewat, initially ruled Mewat under the Delhi Sultanate from 1372 to 1427 then later under independent rule 1427–1527.
- The Sena dynasty, was a Hindu dynasty that ruled from Bengal through the 11th and 12th centuries. The empire at its peak covered much of the north-eastern region of the Indian subcontinent. The rulers of the Sena dynasty traced their origin to the south Indian region of Karnataka.
- Gajapati Empire, was a powerful medieval Hindu dynasty that ruled between 1434 and 1541 over Kalinga (the present day Odisha). At its zenith the empire covered a vast stretch of land bordering river Ganga in the north to river kaveri in the south. They are known for repelling muslim invasions and their conflict with the famous vijayanagara empire.
- Nagvanshis of Chotanagpur, ruled Chotanagpur plateau in Jharkhand.
- Seuna (Yadava) dynasty, 1190–1315, an old Kannada-Maratha dynasty, which at its peak ruled a kingdom stretching from the Tungabhadra to the Narmada rivers, including present-day Maharashtra, north Karnataka and parts of Madhya Pradesh, from its capital at Devagiri.
- Reddy Kingdom, 1325 to 1448, ruled in Andhra Pradesh.
- Vijayanagara Empire (also called the Karnataka Empire), 1336–1646, a Hindu-Kannadiga-Telugus empire based in Karnataka, in the Deccan Plateau region. UNESCO World Heritage Site Hampi in Bellary district of Karnataka was their capital city.

==== Other prominent kingdoms ====
- Rajput States, were a group of Rajput Hindu states that ruled present-day Rajasthan, and at times much of Madhya Pradesh, Gujarat, Uttaranchal, Himachal Pradesh, Western Uttar Pradesh and Central Uttar Pradesh. Some Rajput States, including the Kingdom of Mewar and the Kingdom of Jaisalmer, were established in the early medieval period. Many Rajput kingdoms continued under the Mughals and as Princely States in British India until Indian independence.

==== Northeast India ====
- Jaintia kingdom, 500–1835, a matrilineal kingdom in present-day Sylhet Division, Bangladesh
- Chutia kingdom, 12th century to 1524, in Assam and Arunachal Pradesh, fell to the Ahom kingdom.
- Kamata kingdom, established in the middle of 13th century, broke up in 1582 into Koch Bihar (eventually a princely state) and Koch Hajo (eventually absorbed partly by the Mughals and the Ahom kingdom).
- Ahom Kingdom, 1228–1826, Brahmaputra valley in Assam, eventually taken by the British.
- Dimasa kingdom, 13th century to 1832, in North Cachar Hills and Barak valley in Assam, eventually annexed by the British.
- Tripura kingdom, unknown origin, survived as princely state during the British Raj and absorbed into India.
- Manipur kingdom, unknown to 1949, princely state during the British Raj and absorbed into India in 1949.

=== Early modern period ===
The start of the Mughal Empire in 1526 marked the beginning of the early modern period of Indian history, often referred to as the Mughal era. Sometimes, the Mughal era is also referred as the 'late medieval' period.

- Nayaka dynasties of Kannada, Telugu and Tamil kings that ruled parts of South India after the fall of the Vijayanagara Empire in 1646. Their contribution can be seen in Ikkeri, Sri Ranga, Madurai, and Chitradurga. The earliest of its dynasties date from the early 14th century and the latest in the 19th century.
- Kingdom of Mysore, a southern Indian kingdom founded in 1399 in the vicinity of the modern city of Mysore. Fully independent after the fall of the Vijayanagara Empire in 1646, reduced in size by the British, but ruled by the Wadiyars as a princely state until 1947.
- Mughal Empire, was an imperial state founded by Babur, who had a Turco-Mongol origin from Central Asia. The empire ruled most of the Indian subcontinent from the 16th to early 18th century, though it lingered for another century, formally ending in 1857.
- Maratha Empire, 1674–1818, was an imperial power based in modern-day Maharashtra in western India. Marathas replaced the Mughal rule over large parts of India in the 18th century, but lost the Anglo-Maratha Wars in the early 19th century, and became rulers of princely states.
- Sikh Empire, 1799–1849, was a major power in the Northwestern part of the Indian subcontinent, which arose under the leadership of Maharaja Ranjit Singh in the Punjab region. They were usurped by the British East India Company between the early and mid 19th century, following the British victory in the Second Anglo-Sikh War.

== Historiography ==
Modern historical works written on medieval India have received some criticism from scholars studying the historiography of the period. E. Sreedharan argues that, from the turn of the century until the 1960s, Indian historians were often motivated by Indian nationalism. Peter Hardy notes that the majority of modern historical works on medieval India up until then were written by British and Hindu historians, whereas the work of modern Muslim historians was under-represented. He argues that some of the modern Muslim historiography on medieval India at the time was motivated by Islamic apologetics, attempting to justify "the life of medieval Muslims to the modern world."
