= Huzoor Palace =

Huzoor Palace may refer to:

- Huzoor Palace, Gondal
- Huzoor Palace, Porbandar
