= Bhavsinhji Madhavsinhji =

Maharaja of Porbandar from 1900–1908

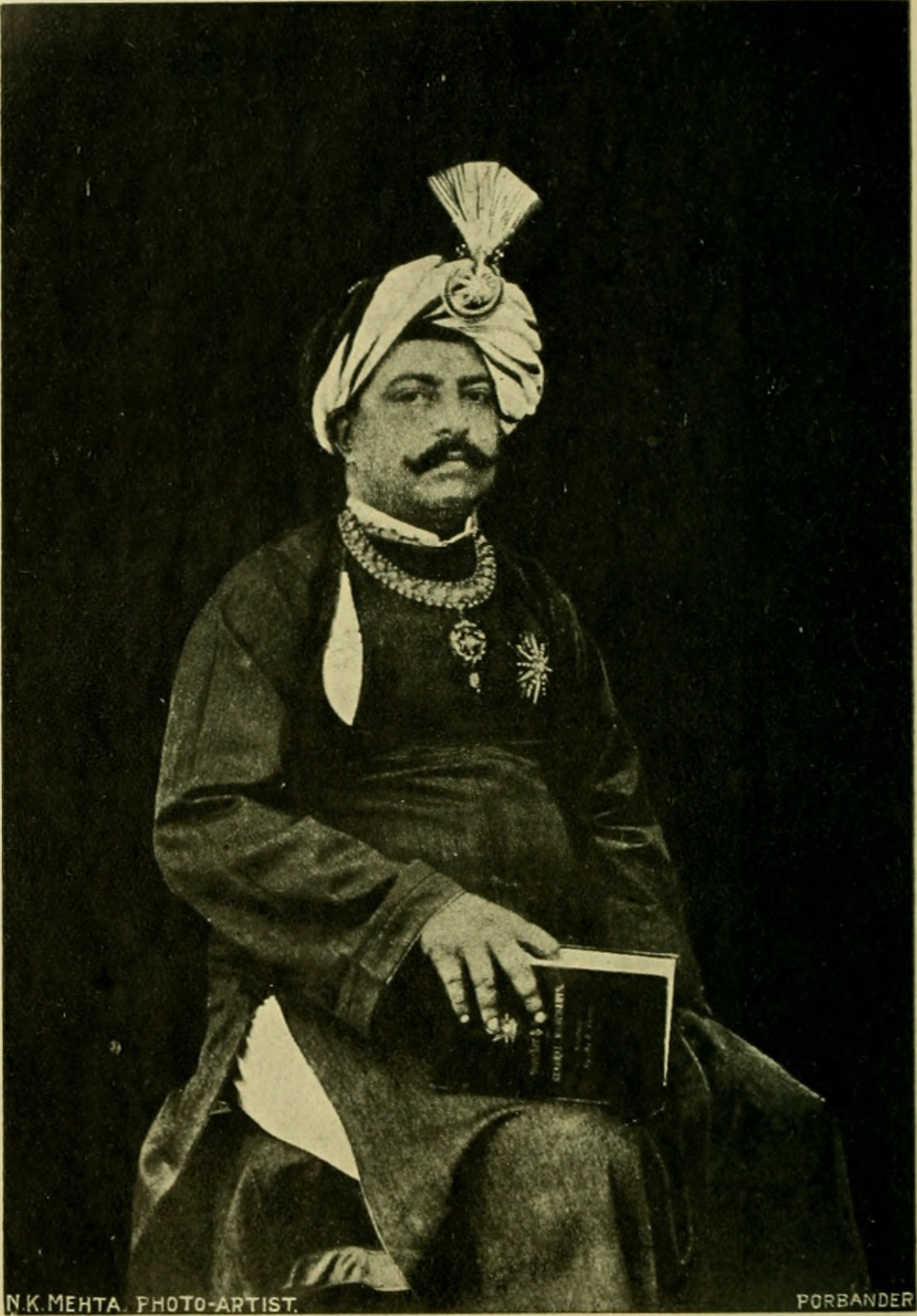
Bhavsinhji

Maharaja Rana Shri Bhavsinhji Madhavsinhji Sahib Bahadur (26 December 1867 – 10 December 1908) was the Maharaja of Porbandar belonging to Jethwa dynasty, who ascended the throne of princely state of Porbandar on 15 September 1900 and ruled till his death in 1908.

He was the grandson of Rana of Porbandar, Rana Shri Vikramatji Khimojiraj Sahib. His father, Madhavsinhji Vikramatji was eldest son of Vikramatji, who died in 1869, when Bhavsinhji was still an infant. Bhavsinhji was educated at Rajkumar College, Rajkot and later served in many administrative posts of Porbandar State. He ascended the throne on 15 September 1900 upon death of his grandfather, Rana Vikramatji.

He administered the state effectively and Porbandar was restored to its position as a First Class with full judicial and administrative powers, which had been relegated to a third class state during reign of his predecessor, Rana Vikramatji.

In 1903, he attended the Coronation Durbar at Delhi and received the Delhi Durbar gold medal.

He died at Porbandar on 10 December 1908. After, his death his only son, from several marriages, Shri Natwarsinhji Bhavsinhji ascended the throne.

== Political office ==
Bhavsinhji Madhavsinhji Jethwa Dynasty Born: 26 December 1867 Died: 10 December 1908
Regnal titles
Preceded by Vikramatji Khimojiraj	Maharaja of Probandar; 1900-1908	Succeeded by Natwarsinhji Bhavsinhji
