= Porbandar State =

Monarchy in India (620–1948)

Coordinates: 21°37′48″N 69°36′00″E

Kingdom of Ghumli (620–1313) Kingdom of Ranpur (1313–1574) Kingdom of Chhaya (1574–1685) Porbandar State (1685–1948)
- 620–1948
- State flag Coat of arms

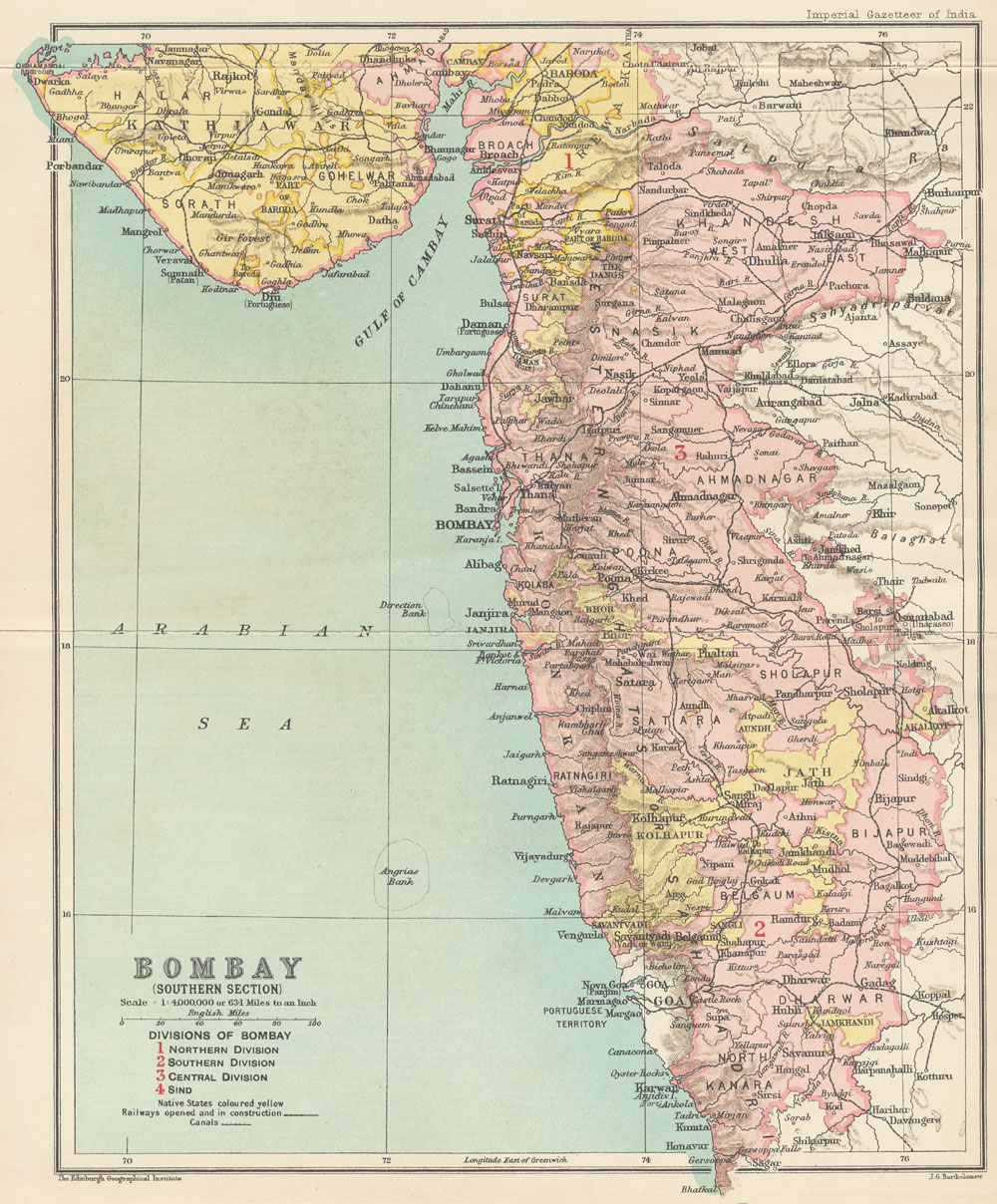
- Porbandar in a map of the Bombay Presidency
- Status: Sovereign monarchy (620-1808); Princely state of the British East India Company (1808-1858) and British India (1858-1948)
- Capital: Ghumli (620-1218); Shrinagar (1218-1220); Ghumli (1220-1313); Ranpur (1313-1574); Chhaya (1547-1685); Porbandar (1685-1948)
- Common languages: Gujarati; Old Gujarati; Hindustani (Hindi-Urdu); Prakrit; English
- Maharaja Rana
  - 10 December 1908-15 February 1948: Natwarsinhji Bhavsinhji (last)
- Dewan
  - 1847–1874: Karamchand Gandhi
- History
  - Established: 620
  - Merged into India: 1948
Preceded by	Succeeded by
Gurjara-Pratihara	Dominion of India
- Today part of: Porbandar district and Junagadh district, Gujarat, India

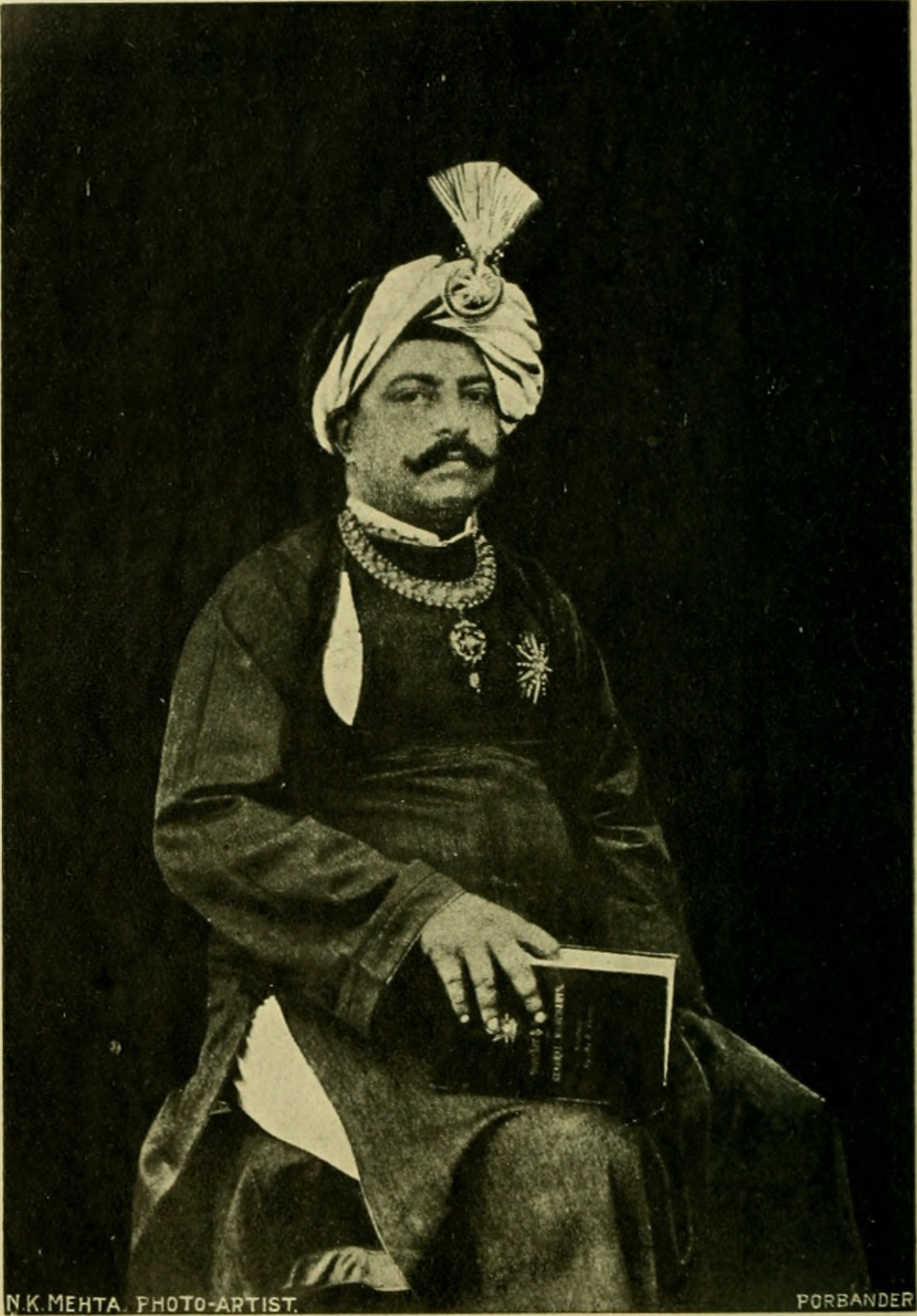
Maharaja Bhavsinhji Madhavsinhji.

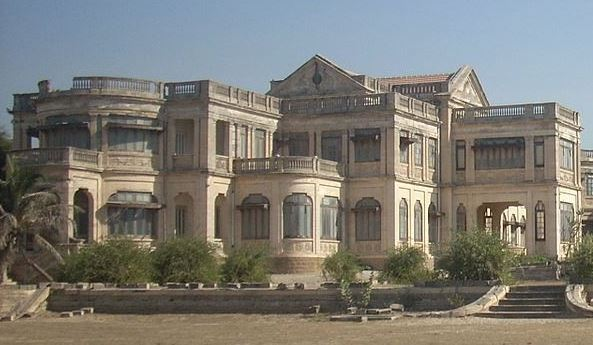
Hizoor Palace was built by last ruler of Princely State of Probandar, Rana Natwarsinhji, in early 20th century, stands near sear the shore at the Marine Drive in the city.

Porbandar State was a princely state during the British Raj ruled by Jethwa dynasty. It was one of the few princely states with a coastline.It was a first class Princely State with 13 Gun Salute, standing fourth in rank among the Principalities in the Kathiawar Agency.

The capital of state was the harbour town of Porbandar. Some other important towns of this state were Bhanvad, Chhaya, Ranpar, and Shrinagar. Earlier Shrinagar served as the capital of Jethwas, then Ghumli served as the capital, but was lost to the Jadejas, however, architectural heritage built by them still stands at Ghumli.

== History ==
On 5 December 1809 it became a British protectorate and between 1886 and 15 September 1900 the state was administered by the Bombay Presidency. It was later made part of the Kathiawar Agency

In 1888, during the reign of Vikramatji Khimojiraj, the State started metre-gauge railway called Porbandar State Railway, which after independence was merged in to Saurashtra Railway.

During reign of Maharaja Bhavsinhji Madhavsinhji (1900-1908) the state was restored its position as a First Class with full judicial and administrative powers. Under his able successor and last ruler Maharaja Sir Natwarsinhji Bhavsinhji, KCSI (1908-1948) the State progressed further.

Upon the Independence of India in 1947, the state acceded unto the dominion of India. It was merged with the 'United State of Kathiawar', effective from 15 February 1948 and eventually came to form part of the present-day state of Gujarat.

The grandfather of Mahatma Gandhi, the leader of Indian independence movement, Uttamchand Gandhi and later his father – Karamchand Gandhi and uncle – Tulsidas Gandhi, served as Dewan to Rana of Porbandar state.
