= Lodhwa =

Coordinates: 23.293°N 70.570°E

Lodhwa / Lodhva is a town in Gir Somnath district of Gujarat. It is a historic town once ruled by Jethwas. The population of town is around 18000. Lodhva is a tourist destination with other places like Sasan Gir, Veraval, Chorvad located within 50 km of it. The nearest railway station from Lodhwa are Chachar (20.3 km) and Kodinar (20.8 km). The Somnath is located only 33.4 km away and nearest sea coast is 11.9 km away at Dhamlej.
