= Shrinagar, Porbandar =

Coordinates: 21.717°N 69.517°E

Shrinagar is a village situated in Porbandar Taluka of Porbandar District, Gujarat State in India. It is located 14.22 km from Porbandar.

Shrinagar was once the Capital of Jethwa dynasty ( who later ruled from Porbandar ), in 1220 AD when Rana Shri Shiyaji transferred the capital from Shrinagar to Ghumli.

There are ruins of ancient 6th century Sun temple in the village built by Jethwa rulers.
