= Agguka I =

8th c. commander of the Saindhava

- Maharaja of Saindhava
- Predecessor: Krishnaraja I
- Dynasty: Saindhava
- Father: Krishnaraja I
- Religion: Hinduism

Agguka I (r. c. 770 – c. 790) was a ruler of the Saindhava dynasty and the commander of the Saindhava naval fleet during the last quarter of 8th century. He was the son of Krishnaraj.

During his reign the Arabs made a fresh bid to establish their supremacy over Saurashtra. In 756, the Arab governor of Sindh sent a naval fleet against the Saindhavas. This naval attack was repulsed by the Saindhavas as they had a strong naval forces. Later in 776, another naval expedition by the Arabs was defeated by the Saindhava naval fleet under the command of Agguka I. A Saindhava inscription relates that Agguka I inflicted a disastrous defeat on the Arab naval fleets which forced the Arabs to withdraw. After this the Caliph Al-Mahdi gave up the project of conquering any part of India through the Navy. In the Saindhava inscription he was titled as Samudradhipati or Master of the western sea.
