= Ghumli =

Ghumli Bhumli, Bhutambilika, Bhumilika
- Village
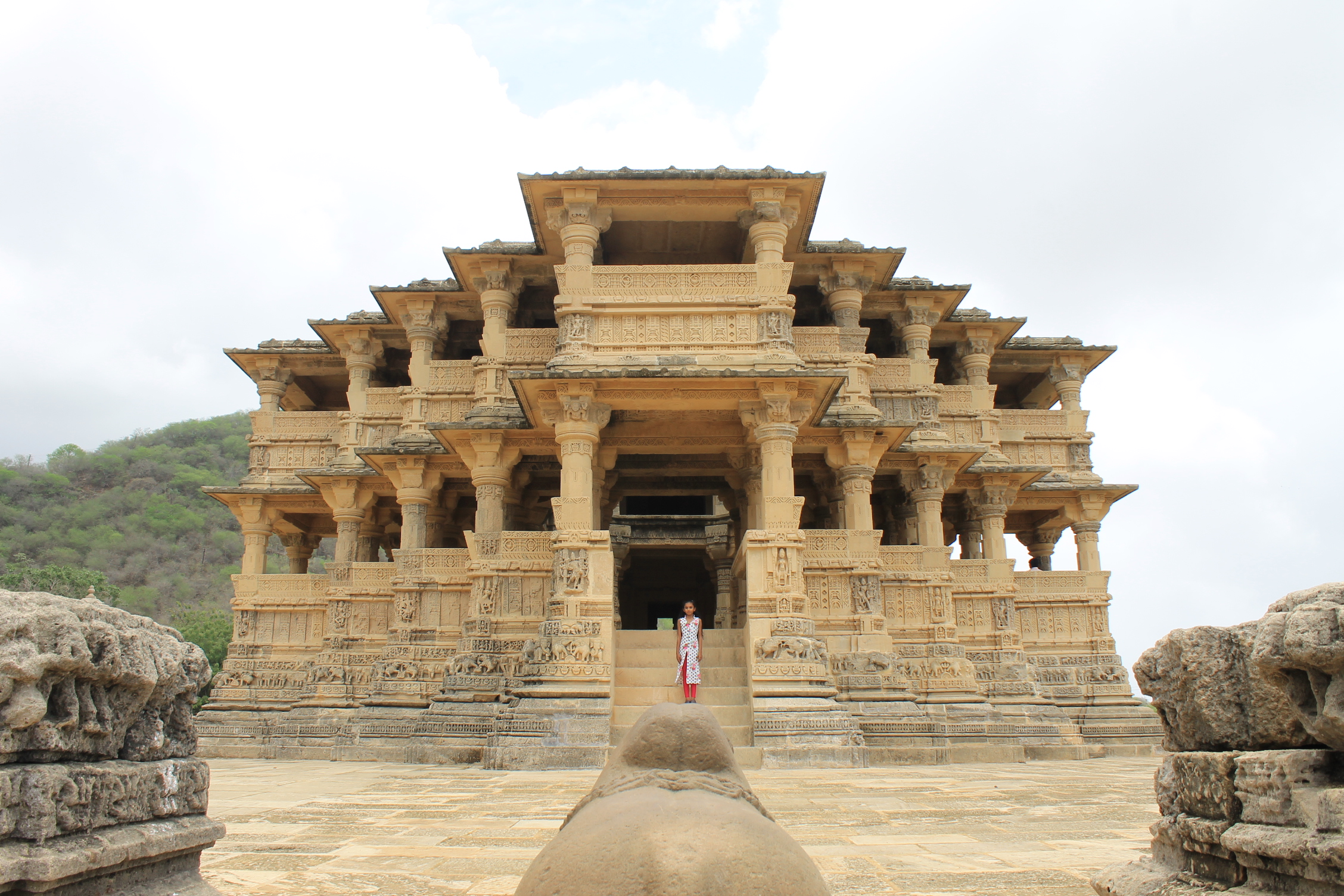
- Navlakha temple

- Location within Gujarat
- Coordinates: 21°53′06″N 69°45′47″E
- Country: India
- State: Gujarat
- Region: Saurashtra
- District: Devbhoomi Dwarka

Languages
  - Official: Gujarati
- Time zone: UTC+5:30 (IST)
- PIN: 360510
- Vehicle registration: GJ-37

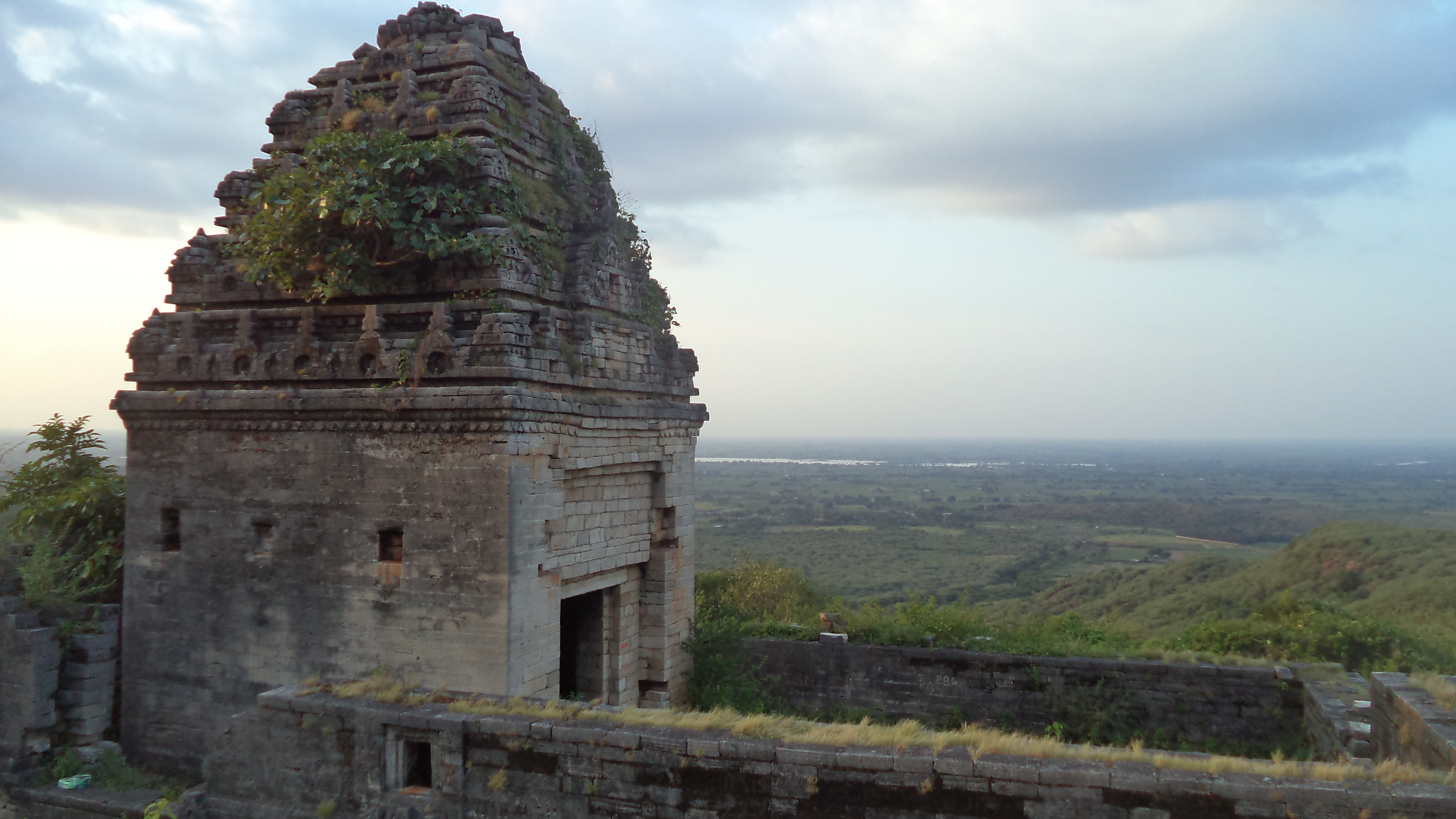
Sonkansari temple

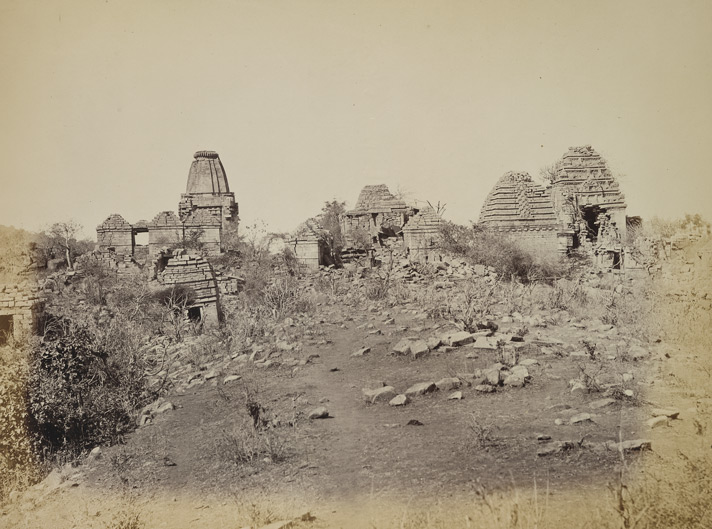
Ruined temples at Sonkansari pond, Ghumli, 1874

Ghumli is a village located 45 km from Jamkhambhaliya, at foothills of Barda, in Devbhumi Dwarka district of Gujarat, India.

== Etymology ==
The Saindhava Copper plates and several inscriptions mention Bhutambilika, Bhumilika, Bhutambilimandal, Bhutambilyan, BhumbhalL Bhubhrutpalli, Bhumbhiliya. It was later corrupted into Bhumli and then Ghumli.

== History ==
Ghumli was the capital of Saindhava dynasty which ruled western Saurashtra from middle of eighth century to middle of tenth century.

It was later the capital of Jethwa dynasty of Gujarat.

Ghumli was declared as Capital by Jethwa dynasty second time in 1220 by Rana Shiyaji, who took the title of Rana Of Ghumli and shifted capital back from Shrinagar

Ghumli remained their Capital till 1313, when Rana Bhanji Jethwa, was defeated at a war, he fled Ghumli and shifted to Ranpur. Legend has it that Ghumli was destroyed due to curse of a Sati named Son with whom Rana Bhanji Jethwa fell in love.

Jam Unaji of Jadeja clan came from Sindh and attacked Ghumli in 1309 but was defeated later in 1313 his son Barmaniyaji Jadeja attacked and defeated Rana Bhanji Jethwa. On the same night Goddess Ambaji came in his dream and told him that, as she has granted the wish ("Asha") of his father to conquer Ghumli, he should make a temple in her name. So Bamaniyaji built the Temple of Ambaji on the hill in the middle of Ghumli and named it as Ashapura Mata Temple. He completely destroyed Ghumli and turned it into ruins.

== Present day ==
Government of Gujarat and Archaeological Survey of India have taken a project to restore historical places of Ghumli. At present, Ghumli is an important archaeological site of Gujarat: The point of interest are - Navlakha temple; Ghumli Ganesh temple; Ashapura temple; Vindyavasini temple; Sonkansari or Son Kasari temple; step-wells [Vikai or Vikia Vav and Jetha vav]; historical gates. Kileshwar Mahadev temple, built by Jethwa rulers is nearby. Bhan Gate named after Bhan Jethwa near Ghumali Navlakha Temple and Rampol Gate at Ghumali are of historical interest. Trikamji Bapu Mandir, Ravno Nes and so is Khodiyar mataji jar are other places of interest.

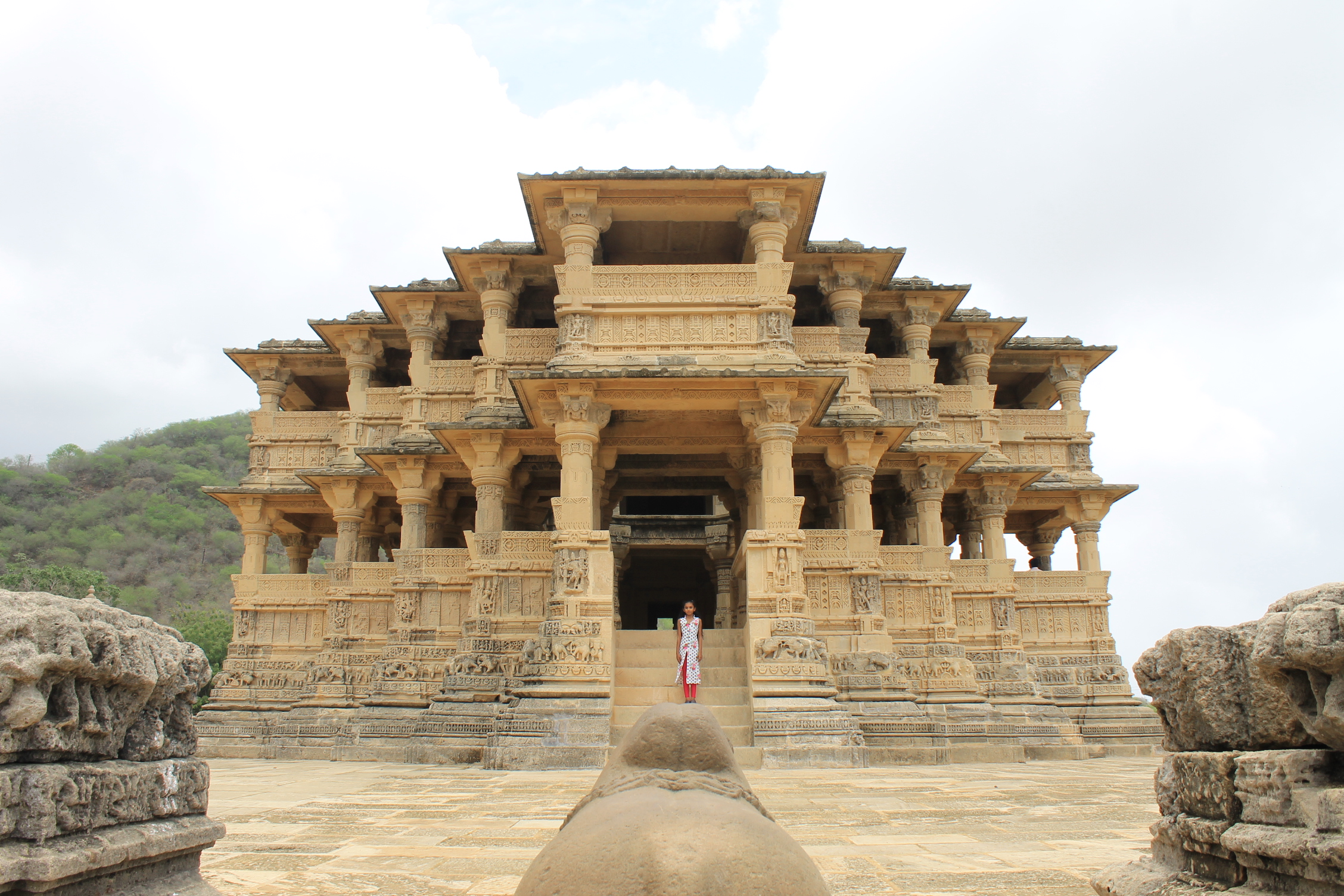
Navlakha Temple, Ghumli

Ghumli houses Navlakha Temple, built by Jethwa rulers in the 12th century, considered to be oldest Sun temple of Gujarat, now in ruins. The temple is built in the Solanki style of architecture with entwining tusk of three elephants as a trade mark of temple. It is located at the foothills.

Close by, little easterly to Navlakha temple there are step wells called "Vikai Vav" the largest in Kathiawar and "Jetha vav". Vikai or Vikia Vaav built by Jethwa ruler Vikiaji after whom it is named, is the oldest and one of the biggest step wells of Gujarat measuring almost 60 by 40.5 sq m. The well has numerous flights of steps leading up to it and string-coursed carvings. The entrance pavilions can still be seen standing intact at three places.

== See also ==
- Navlakha Temple, Ghumli
