= Huzoor Palace, Porbandar =

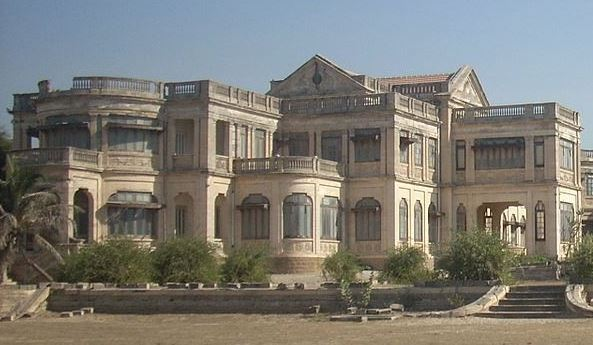
- Huzoor Palace at Porbandar

- Location within India

General information
- Architectural style: European architecture with neo-classical colonnades
- Location: Porbandar, India
- Coordinates: 21.628°N 69.613°E
- Construction started: early 20th century
- Client: Maharaja Rana Natwarsinhji

The Huzoor Palace, also spelled Huzar Palace, is a palace in Porbandar, in the Indian state of Gujarat. It was built by Rana Natwarsinhji, who was the last Maharaja of the Princely State of Porbandar, in the early years of the 20th century, with clear European influences. The palace is now used by the successors of the Maharaja's family who reside in London.

During the Navratri festival people of the town queue up at the palace grounds to pay a nazar or pay respect to the former Maharaja and Maharani of Porbandar.

== Location ==
The palace is situated in the city of Porbandar of the Kathiawar Peninsula in western Gujarat on the Arabian Sea coast at the terminal part of the Marine Drive, facing the sea, spread over a sprawling ground. It is served by air, rail and road services. The railway station is one kilometre (0.62 mi) to the east of the town and trains run to Ahmedabad and Mumbai. The town's airport is seven kilometres (4.3 mi) away and daily flights operate to Mumbai & Ahmedabad

== History ==
Huzoor Palace was constructed in early part of the 20th century by Rana Natwarsinhji, who was the last Maharaja of the Princely State of Porbandar. Tourists are prohibited from visiting the palace, as it is now used by the successors of the Maharaja's family who reside in London.

Presently, the palace seems to be in desolate condition with door taken out and brick walls put in place. It is not open to visitors.

== Architecture ==
The palace was built with a clear European influence, with many wings and a slanting roof. The windows are very large with views of the sea. The various wings of the palace have front and backyards, and arranged so that they present a natural scenic ambiance surrounded by gardens and fountains. The ornamental porticos in the facade are semi-circular in shape, built with neoclassical columns.

== Bibliography ==
- Gandhi, Amrita (15 February 2014). Live Like a Maharaja: How to Turn Your Home into a Palace. Penguin Books Limited. ISBN 978-93-5118-627-4.
- Rough, Guide (1 October 2013). The Rough Guide to India. Rough Guides. ISBN 978-1-4093-4267-0.
