= Navlakha temple =

12th century Sun temple in Gujarat, India

Coordinates: 21.8836°N 69.7617°E

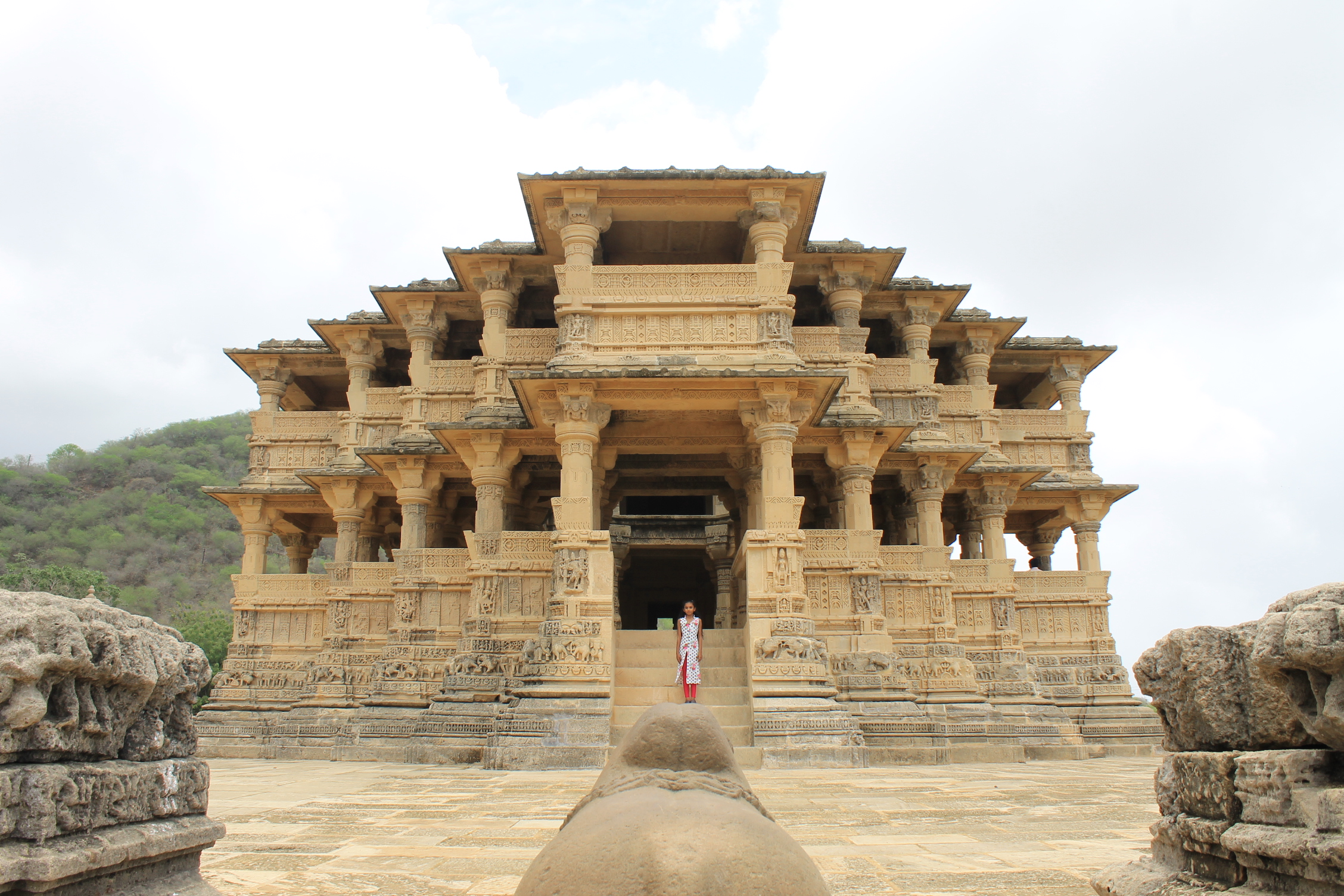

Religion
- Affiliation: Hinduism
- District: Devbhoomi Dwarka
- Deity: Lord Surya

Location
- Location: Ghumli
- State: Gujarat
- Country: India
- Interactive map of Navlakha temple

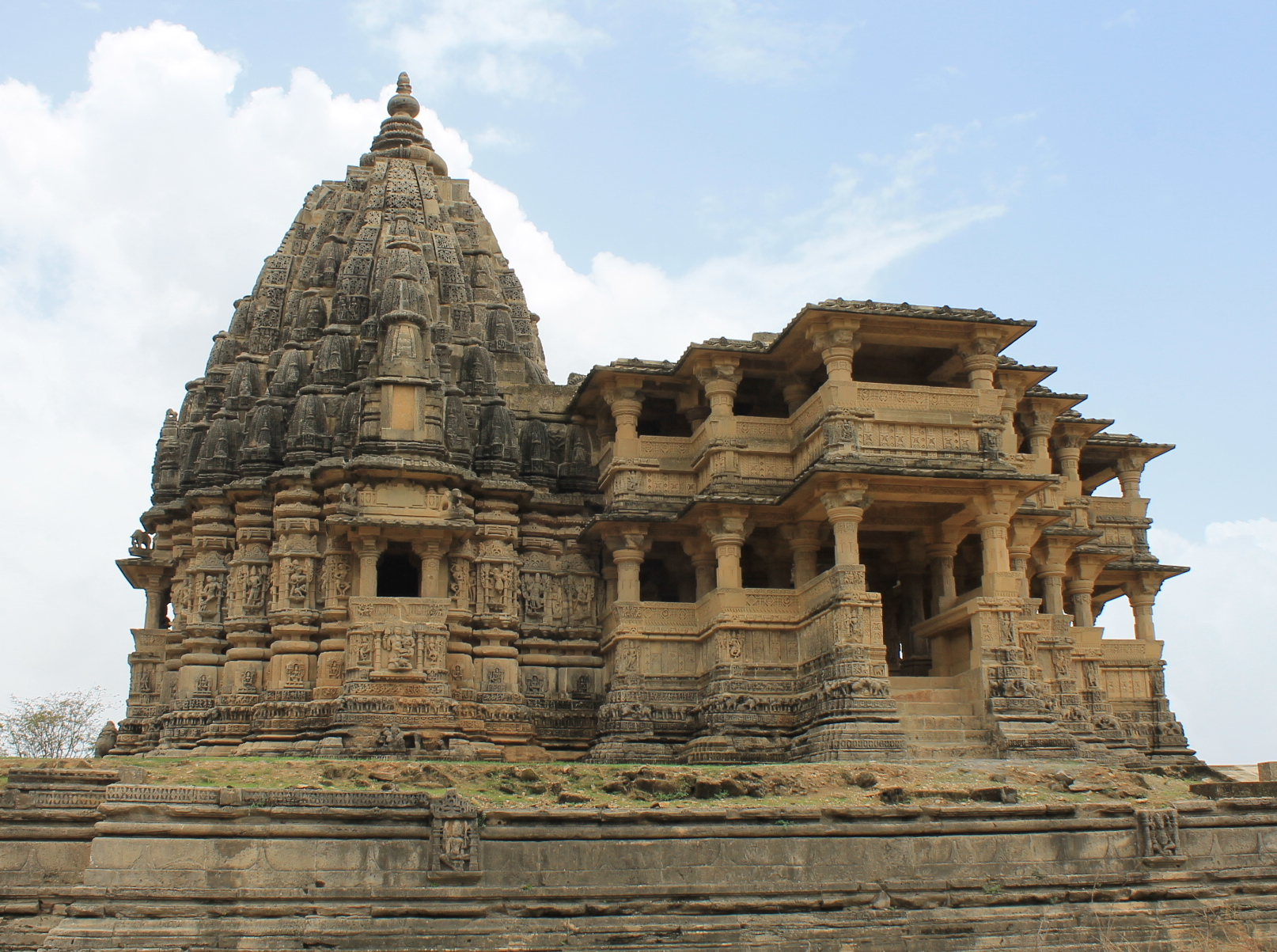
Navlakha Temple

Navlakha Temple at Ghumli, Gujarat, India, is a 12th Century Sun temple built by Jethwa dynasty rulers.

== History ==
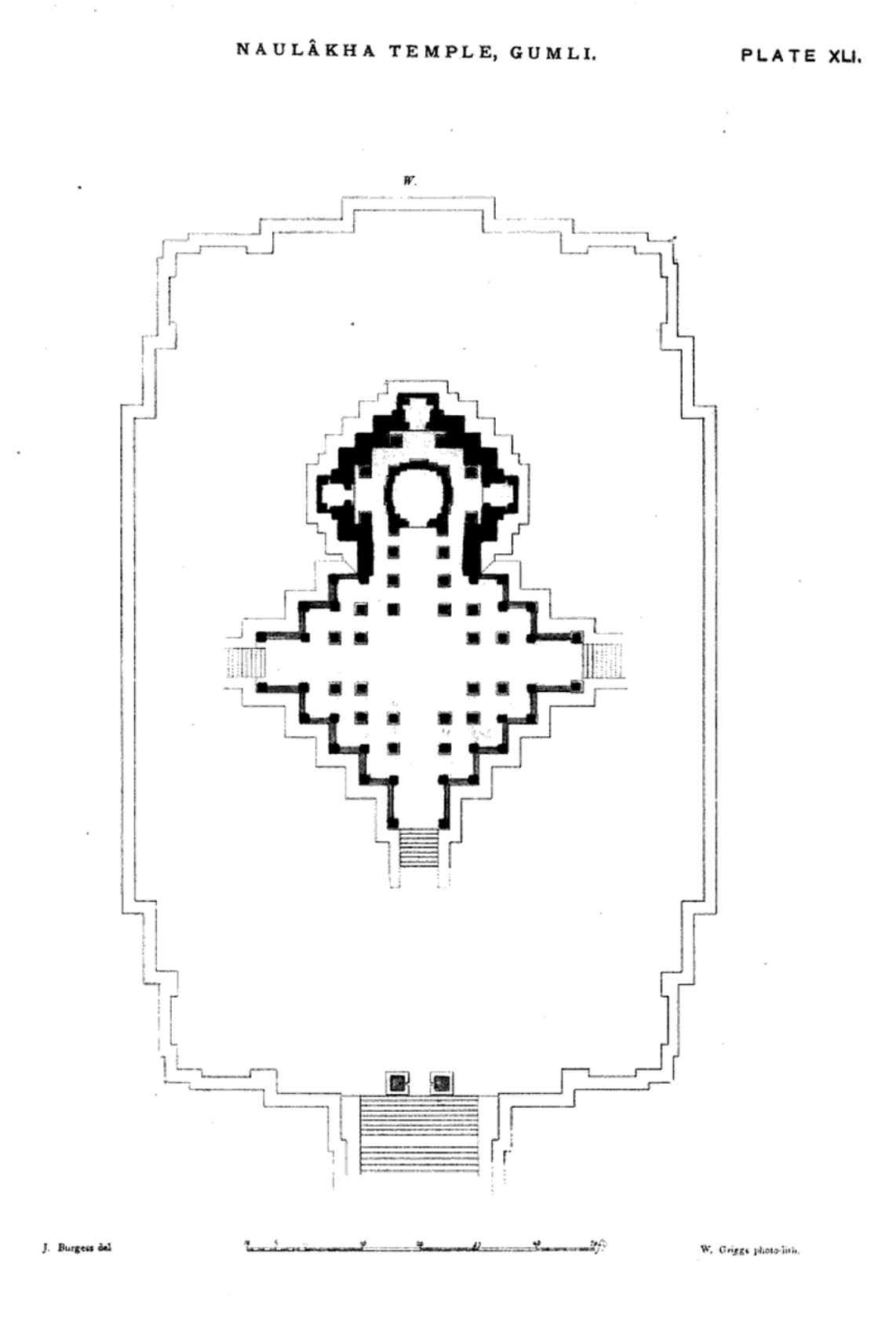
Navalakha Temple plan

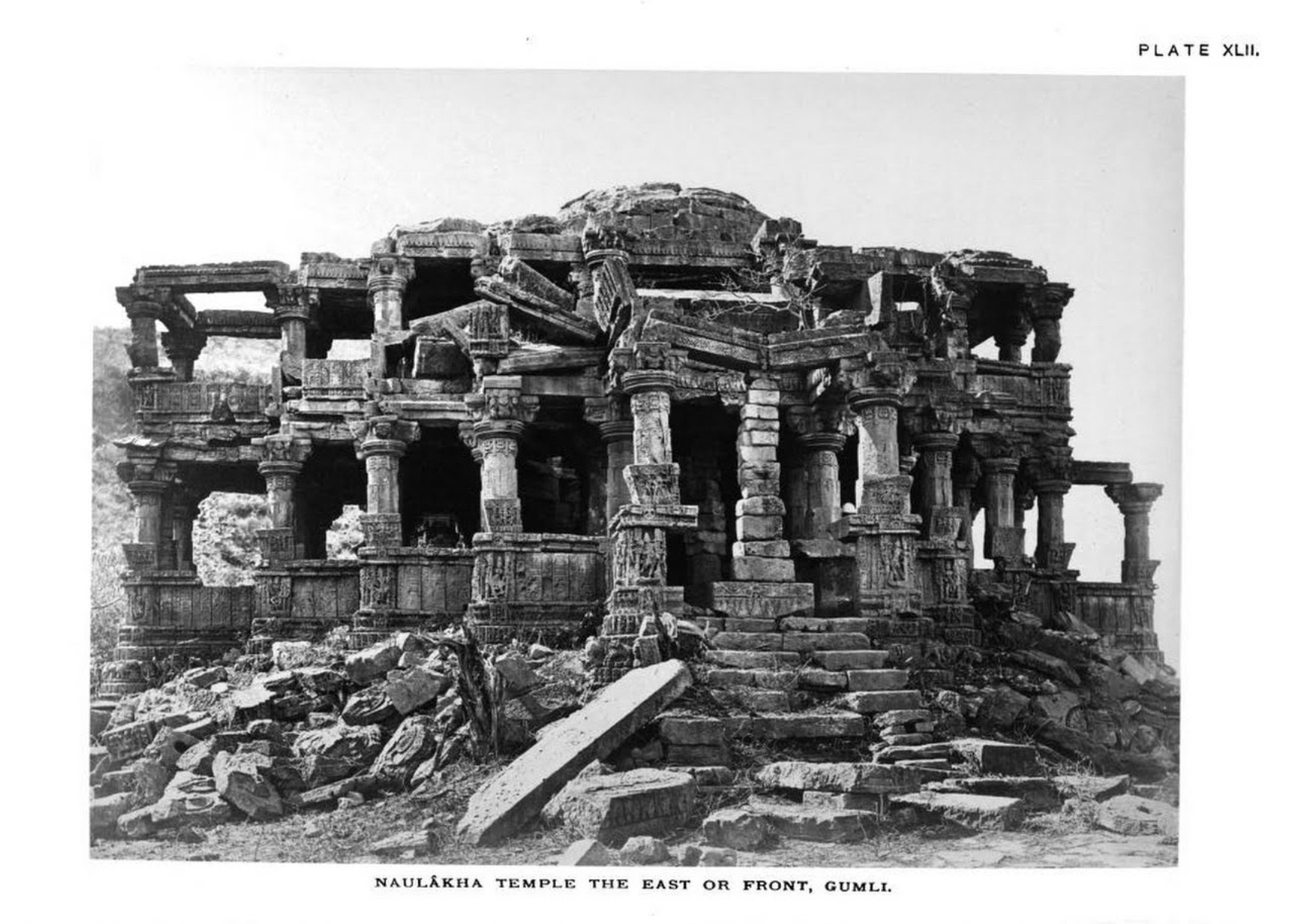
Navalakha Temple, ruins in 19th-century, 1876

Navlakha Temple at Ghumli was built by Jethwa rulers in 11th century dedicated to Sun god, Surya and is oldest sun temple of Gujarat. It has the largest base (Uagati) of the temples in Gujarat, measuring 45.72 x 30.48 m. Facing East, it had a beautiful entrance arch or Kirti Toran, that is now lost. The sanctum sanctorum (garbhagriha), covered pradakshina path, large gathering hall and its three shringar chowkis -anointment thrones, are eye catching. On the surrounding walking path we find three directions with balconies. The mandapa has eight-sided pillars for support. In the small niches we find sculptures. The entrances are two storied. At the back wall of the temple we find two huge elephants fighting with their trunks. In Bhadra gavaksha there is the image of Brahma-Savitri, in the west is the Shiva-Parvati, to the north is Lakshmi Narayan.

The Navlakha Temple built at a cost of Nine Lacs hence the name Navlakha. The temple is built in Maru-Gurjara architecture (or the Solanki style). have the three entwining tusks of elephants as its trademark and is considered to be high noon of Solanki style of architect.

Outside main temple there is a temple dedicated to Ganesha, called the Ganesh Dehra

== Present status ==
The Archaeological Survey of India, has taken up rehabilitation of temple in 2011 and develop the place as site of tourist and historical importance.

== See also ==
- Ghumli
