= Chhaya, India =

Chhaya
- City
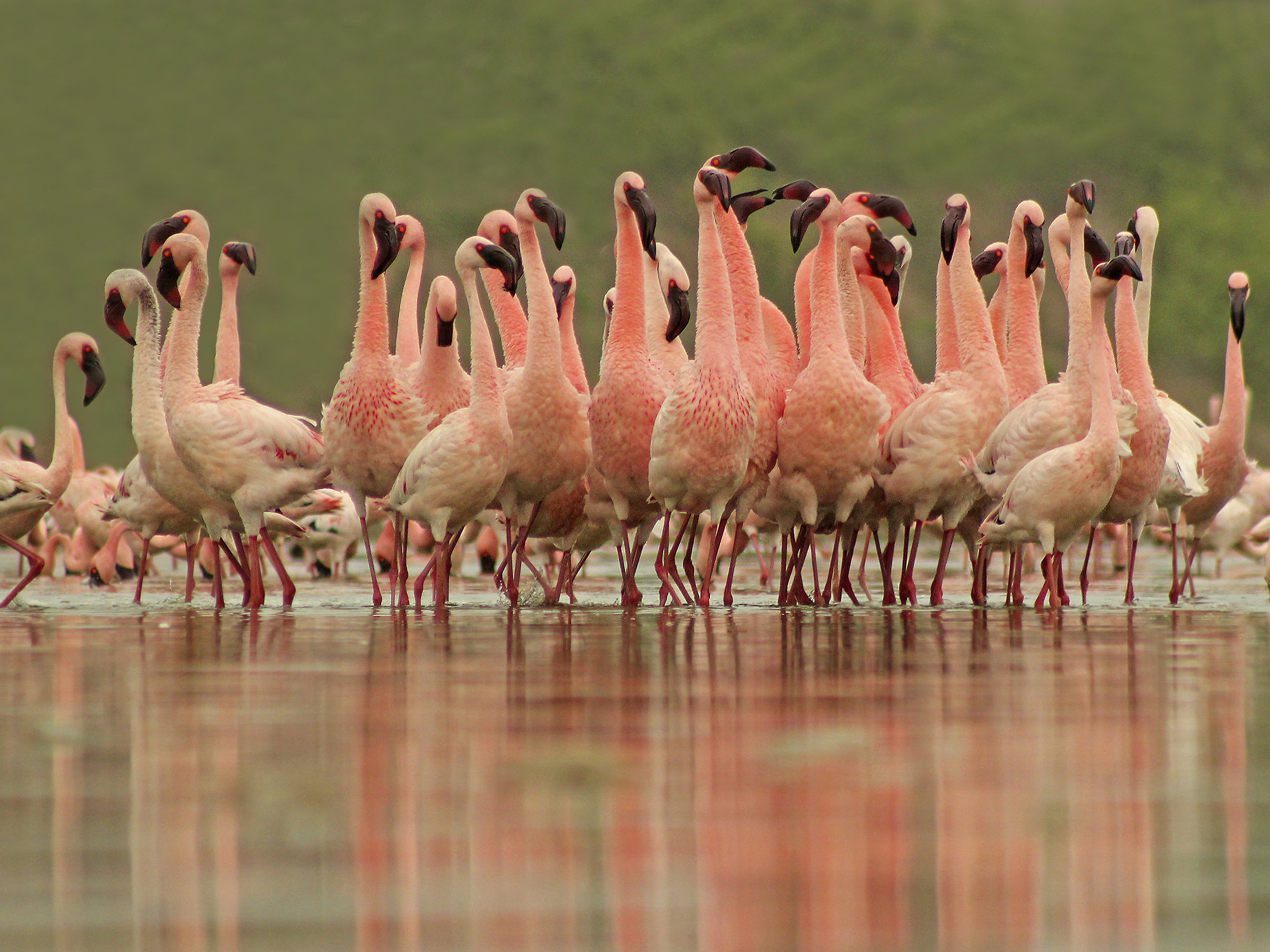
- Flamingos at Mokarsagar Wetlands, Chhaya

- Location in Gujarat, India Chhaya (India)
- Coordinates: 21°39′09″N 69°40′29″E
- Country: India
- State: Gujarat
- District: Porbandar

Government
  - Type: Municipal Corporation
  - Body: Porbandar–Chhaya Municipal Corporation

Population (2011)
  - Total: 47,699

Languages
  - Official: Gujarati
- Time zone: UTC+5:30 (IST)
- Postal code: 360578
- Vehicle registration: GJ-25
- Website: gujaratindia.com

Chhaya is a city and a Municipal corporation in Porbandar district in the state of Gujarat, India. Chhaya and Porbandar are the twin cities of each other and both cities are jointly governed by Porbandar–Chhaya Municipal Corporation.

== Geography ==
Chhaya is situated on the west bank of the Porbandar creek and the Mokal Ran lies to the west of it.

== Demographics ==
As of 2001 India census, Chhaya had a population of 38,525. Males constitute 53% of the population and females 47%. Chhaya has an average literacy rate of 71%, higher than the national average of 59.5%; with male literacy of 78% and female literacy of 62%. 12% of the population is under 6 years of age. According to the 1881 census it had 996 inhabitants.

== History ==
It was the Jethva capital after the abandonment of Ranpur and previous to the adoption of Porbandar, and the old palace is still there.

Jethwas are from Chhaya village. The Jethwas have had capitals at starting with Morvi in 900 AD, changing with times to Shrinagar, Dhank, Chhaya, Ghumli, Ranpur and lastly to Porbandar (from 1685 till 1947).

== Main-attraction ==
Darbargarh, the palace of Jethwas at Chhaya was initially built in 1540AD.

The traditional Garba is organized here from monarchy period in Darbargadh area. Only traditional musical instruments and lyrics are used.
