= Saindhava =

Medieval Indian dynasty of western Saurashtra

Saindhavas of Ghumli
- c. 735 CE–c. 920 CE
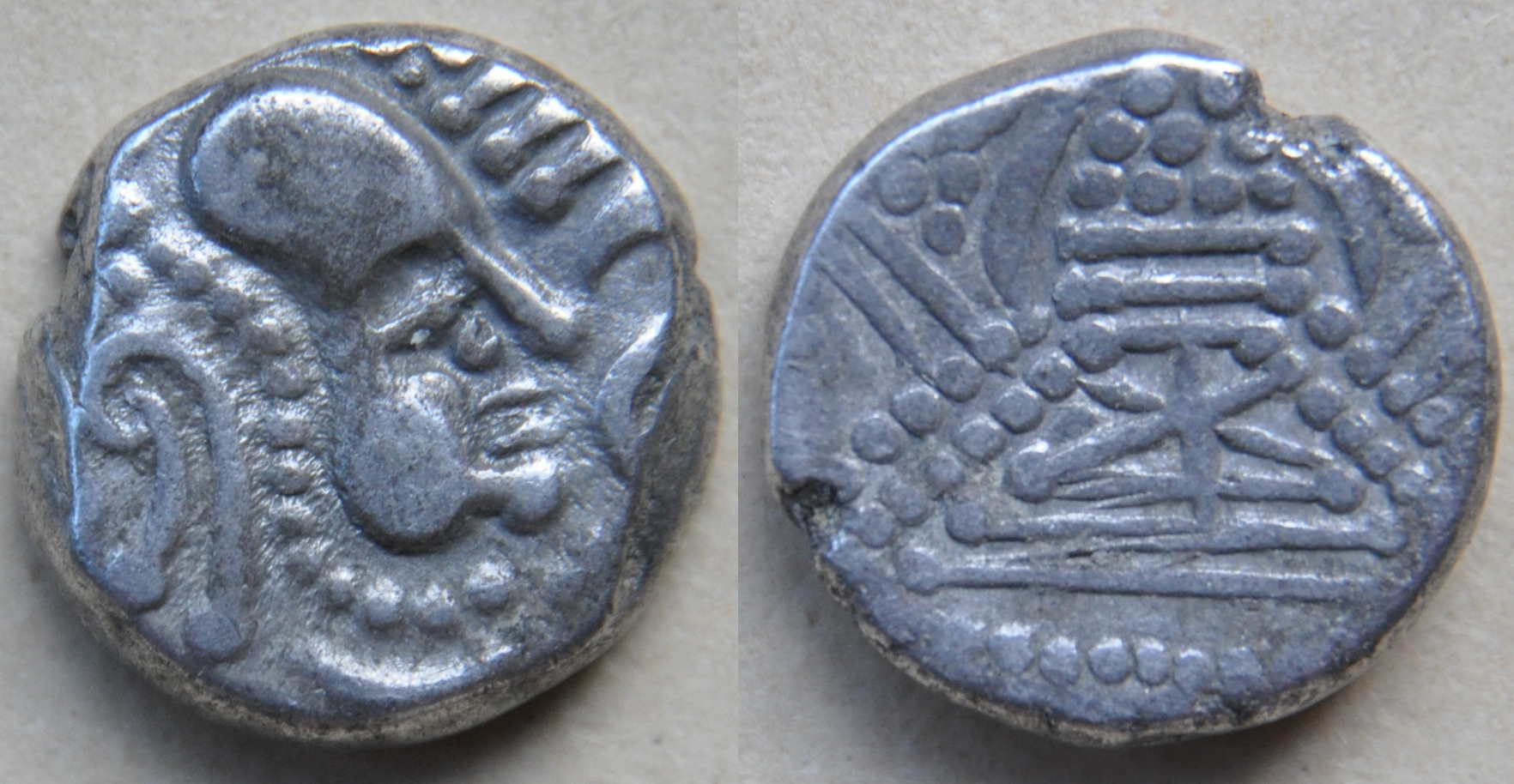
- Drachma of the Saindhava or Chalukya dynasties dating from about 800–950. The front represents a bust, turned right of Indo-Sassanian style with points, and the back contains a stylized fire.

- Location of the Saindavas and main neighbouring polities in South Asia, circa 800 CE.
- Capital: Bhutamabilika (now Ghumli, Gujarat, India)
- Common languages: Sanskrit, Prakrit
- Religion: Hinduism, Jainism, Buddhism
- Government: Monarchy
- History
  - Established: c. 735 CE
  - Disestablished: c. 920 CE
Preceded by	Succeeded by
Maitraka	Chudasama dynasty; Jethwa dynasty
- Today part of: India

The Saindhavas, also known as Jayadrathas, was a medieval Indian dynasty that ruled western Saurashtra (now in Gujarat, India) from c. 735 CE to c. 920 CE, probably in alliance with Maitrakas in its early years. Their capital was at Bhutamabilika (now Ghumli). The known historical events during their rule are the attacks of Arabs repulsed by Agguka I.

== Sources of information ==
The earliest reference of Saindhava was found in Navsari copperplate of Chalukya governor of Lata region (modern-day South Gujarat) Avanijanashraya Pulakeshin dated 738-39 CE which enlisted the dynasties defeated by Arabs and finally repelled by him. The eighth verse in Gwalior prashasti of Bhojadeva describes the Saindhava ruler defeated by Pratihara king Nagabhatta. The nine copper plate grants issued by Saindhavas help to establish their genealogy as well as provides useful information about the dynasty. Six grants inscribed in 12 copper plates were discovered while digging on roadside in Ghumli in 1936. One more copper plate issued by Jaika was recovered from Morbi. A clay seal referring to Pushyena was recovered from Valabhi (Vala). Another copperplate grant is found from Ambalas (near Junagadh). One more from Dhinki issued by Jaikadeva (purportedly from 738 CE) was found as a forgery later.

== Origin and rule ==
Saindhavas were originated from Sindh (now in Pakistan) who moved southward and established themselves in Apara-Surashtra (western Saurashtra comprising modern Jamnagar, Devbhoomi Dwarka, Rajkot, Morbi and Porbandar districts in Gujarat, India). The Ghumli grant issued by Jaika II describes their family as Jayadratha-vamsa. Other plates describes themselves as Saindhavas as they originated from Sindh.

Their capital was at Bhutambilika or Bhumlika (now Ghumli) in Barda hills. Their emblem was fish, the sign of Varuna and suitable for their naval supremacy.

The early kings ruled probably in an allegiance with the Maitrakas of Vallabhi. They ruled Halar and Sorath regions constituting western part of Saurashta peninsula.

== History ==
Pushyadeva is the earliest known king mentioned in the grants found from Ghumli. A clay seal referring to Pushyena, son of Ahivarma was recovered from Vallabhi (Vala). It was believed that this Pushyena and Pushyadeva were one person but a copperplate found from Ambalas mentions Ahivarma as a son of Pushyena. So Pushyadeva might be a son of another Ahivarma.

It seems that Ahivarma I was probably ruling in Sindh and his son Pushyena had to move Saurashtra due to invasion by Arabs Arabs fighting for the Umayyad Caliphate (711 CE). His clay seal was found in Valabhi (Vala) which implies that he was probably a Mahasenapati (Chief Commander) under Maitrakas. He might have gained power later. Pushyena was succeeded by his son Ahivarma II whose title was Maharaja. He had given a grant to Bhikkhuni-Vihara from Kuberanagara (probably near Kodinar or Kubada village near Amreli). The date of grant is not clear but may belong to Valabhi Era 404 (723 CE).

Pushyadeva, son of Ahivarma II, is mentioned in the last grant found from Ghumli and he probably ruled from c. 735 to 750, based on dates of his descendants. His capital was at Ghumli and was a contemporary of Maitraka ruler Shiladitya VI. He is mentioned as Jayadratha-vamsha-shekhara. He was succeeded by his son Krishnaraja I who reigned c. 750 CE to 770 CE. He had five titles including Mahasamanta.

Find spots of inscriptions issued during the Saindhava rule. The dynasty mainly ruled western parts of Saurashtra region of Gujarat (modern Jamnagar, Devbhoomi Dwarka, Rajkot, Morbi and Porbandar districts).

Agguka I, son of Krishnaraja I, succeeded him and reigned c. 770 CE to 790 CE. He is praised heavily in two early grants found from Ghumli. During his rule, the Arabs tried to establish themselves in the Saurashtra. In 759 CE, Hasham was appointed as the governor of Sindh who sent an Arab naval fleet under Amarubin Jamal to attack to the coast of Barda region. It was defeated by the Saindhava naval fleet, which was then leading naval power of western India. Twenty years later, another Arab naval fleet was sent, which initially succeeded in capturing a town near Barda. The campaign was withdrawn following an outbreak of an epidemic, according to Arab historians. They also state that the Caliph decided to never enter India from there again. But Agguka I's inscriptions state that he had severely defeated the Arabs in 776 CE and they had to withdraw. He took the title Apara Samudradhipati (apara-samudr-ddhipati), "Master of the Sea". During his reign, Valabhi probably fell due to Arab invasion (788 CE).

Agguka's son and successor Ranaka I probably reigned from c. 790 CE to 810 CE. He is mentioned in Ghumli grant which states that he had donated a village in Pachchhatri vishaya (district). It also mentions his wife Kshemeshwari. He had two sons, Krishnaraja II and Jaika I.

Ranaka I was succeeded by his son Krishnaraja II (reigned c. 810 CE to 825 CE). He was succeeded by his infant son Agguka II. The Ghumli grant dated Gupta Era 513 (832 CE) is issued by his uncle Jaika I, step-brother of Krishnaraja II, so it seems that Agguka II ruled probably for very short period and he was disposed by his uncle few years before 832 CE, probably c. 830 CE. This grant mentions the donation of a Dhak (now Dhank) village in Pachchatri Vishaya to a Brahmin from Someshwara (now Somnath). Another undated grant mentions the donation of a village to a Brahmin of Bhillamala (now Bhinmal) in the same district. He reigned c. 825 CE to 845 CE. His sons were Agguka III and Chamudaraja.

Jaika I was succeeded by Agguka III who reigned c. 845 CE to 870 CE. None of grants is found but he is praised in grant by his son and successor Ranaka II. He reigned c. 870 CE to 880 CE. His grant dated Gupta Era 555 (874-875 CE) mentions the donation of villages in Swarnamanjari district to some temples and a monastery. It also mentions his son Jaika but he did not succeed him probably because he died early or his granduncle Chamundaraja usurped the throne. He probably reigned from c. 880 CE to 885 CE.

Chamundaraja was succeeded by his son Agguka IV who reigned c. 885 CE to 900 CE. He had donated a village to a Brahmin in Swarnamanjari district in Gupta Era 567 (886-887 CE). He was succeeded by Jaika II (reigned c. 900 CE to 920 CE) who was the last known ruler. His two grants are recovered from Ghumli and Morbi. Morbi grant mentions the donation of a village to two Brahmins. Ghulmi grant has a long genealogy from Pushyadeva to Jaika II but does not mention branches of Krishnaraja II and Agguka III. Jaika II had granted a village to Nanna Mathika, a monastery, in Swarnamanjari district in Gupta Era 596 (915 CE). It was built by Nanna, a trader from Bhillamala and was located near Purushottam monastery in Bhutambilika division.

The copper plate inscription of Ranaka Bashkaladeva dated 987 CE found from Ghulmi indicates that he was probably a vassal of Chaulukyas of Patan and ruled "Jyeshthukadesha", a region around Ghumli. But the inscription does not refer to Saindhavas or their descendants. It is assumed that between 920 CE and 987 CE, the rule of the Saindhavas ended.

Ghumli was the capital under the Jethwa dynasty who later ruled the region. There might be some relation between Jayadratha-Saindhava dynasty and the Jethwa dynasty which had Hanuman as its emblem instead of fish.

== Architecture ==
Their notable constructions are Hindu monastery (mathika) at Ghumli and temples dedicated to Surya, Shiva and Shakti (Goddess) at Suvarnamanjari. The inscriptions referring to temples are scarce. The temples constructed in this period follows the contemporary and earlier traditions of Maitrakas.

== List of rulers ==
- Ahivarma I
- Pushyena
- Ahivarma II
- Pushyadeva (r. c. 735 – c. 750)
- Krishnaraja I (r. c. 750 – c. 770)
- Agguka I (r. c. 770 – c. 790)
- Ranaka I (r. c. 790 – c. 810)
- Krishnaraja II (r. c. 810 – c. 825)
- Agguka II (minor ruler, lost throne c. 830)
- Jaika I (r. c. 825 -c. 845)
- Agguka III (r. c. 845 – c. 870)
- Ranaka II (r. c. 870 – c. 880)
- Chamundaraja (r. c. 880 – c. 885)
- Agguka IV (c. 885 – c. 900)
- Jaika II (r. c. 900 – c. 920)

== Bibliography ==
- Shastri, Hariprasad Gangashankar (1974). Parikh, Rasiklal Chhotalal; Shastri, Hariprasad Gangashankar (eds.). ગુજરાતનો રાજકીય અને સાંસ્કૃતિક ઇતિહાસ: મૈત્રક કાલ અને અનુ-મૈત્રક કાલ [Political and Cultural History of Gujarat: Maitraka Era and Post-Maitraka Era]. Research Series – Book No. 68 (in Gujarati). Vol. III. Ahmedabad: Bholabhai Jeshingbhai Institute of Learning and Research. pp. 137–144, 165–166, 453.
