= Porbandar =

Porbandar Sudamapuri
- City
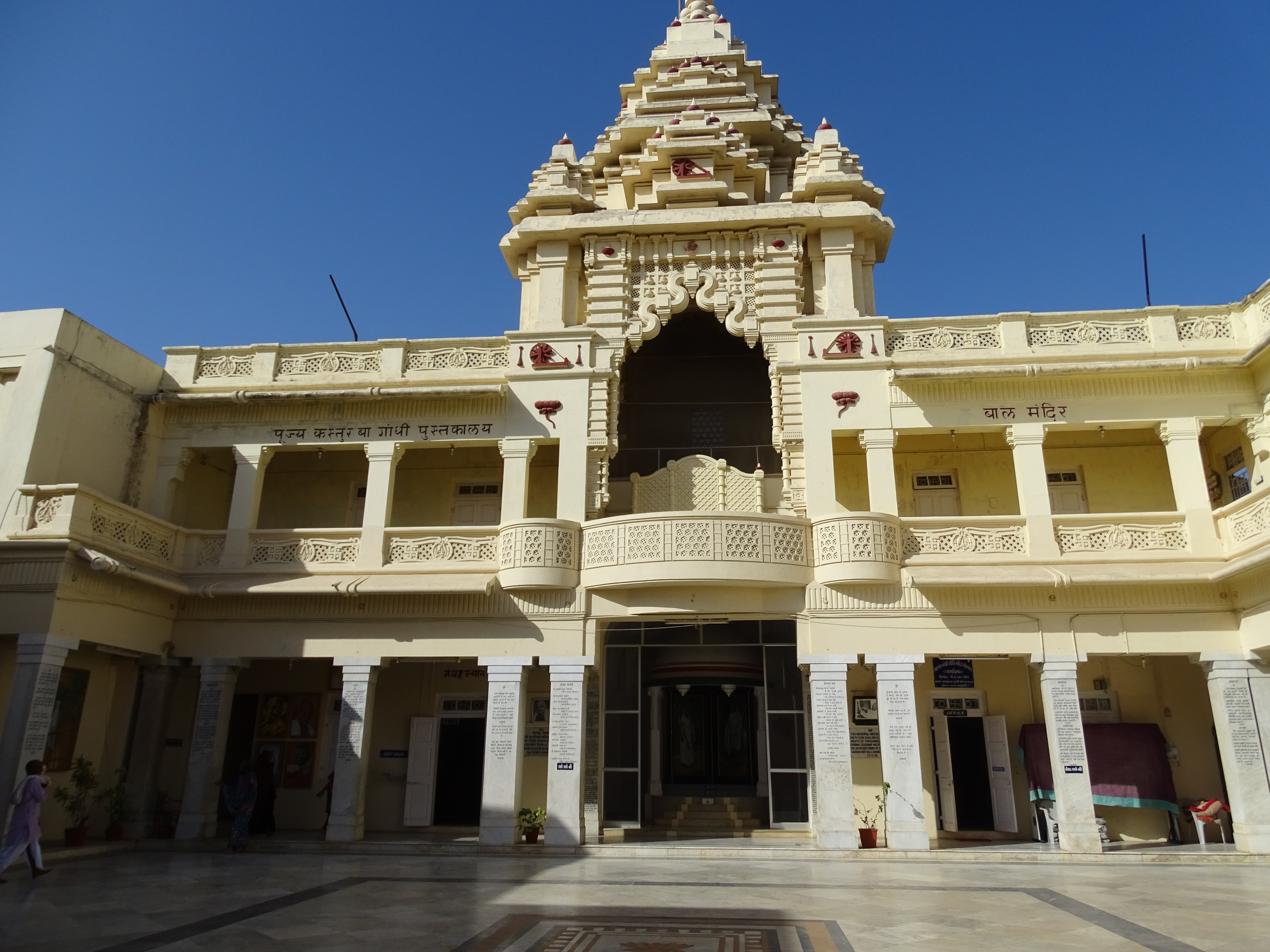
- Kirti Mandir, birthplace of Mahatma Gandhi

- Logo of Porbandar Chhaya Municipal Corporation

- Porbandar (Gujarat) Porbandar (India)
- Coordinates: 21°38′30.0″N 69°37′45.5″E
- Country: India
- State: Gujarat
- District: Porbandar

Government
  - Body: Porbandar - Chhaya Municipal Corporation

Area
  - Total: 38.43 km^{2} (14.84 sq mi)
- Elevation: 30.85 m (101.2 ft)

Population (2011)
  - Total: 152,760
  - Density: 3,975/km^{2} (10,300/sq mi)

Languages
  - Official: Gujarati
- Time zone: UTC+5:30 (IST)
- PIN: 360575
- Vehicle registration: GJ-25

Porbandar is a city and the headquarters of the Porbandar district in the Indian state of Gujarat. It is the birthplace of Mahatma Gandhi and Sudama. It was the former capital of the Porbandar princely state. Porbandar and Chhaya are the twin cities, of each other and both cities are jointly governed by Porbandar–Chhaya Municipal Corporation.

== History ==
=== Princely State ===
Porbandar was the seat of the eponymous princely state in British India. Later the state belonged to the Jethwa clan of Rajputs and had been established in the area since at least the mid-16th century. The state was subordinate to the Mughal governor of Gujarat Subah until being overrun by the Marathas in the latter half of the 18th century. After, they came under the authority of the Gaekwad court at Baroda and eventually of the Peshwa.

=== After Independence ===
Upon the Independence of India in 1947, the state was annexed into the dominion of India. It was merged with the 'United State of Kathiawar', effective 15 February 1948 and eventually came to form part of the present-day state of Gujarat. The last King of Porbandar was Natwarsinhji Bhavsinhji Maharaj.

== Geography ==
Porbandar is located at 21°37′48″N 69°36′0″E. It has an average elevation of 1 metre (3 ft).

=== Climate ===
Like most of Gujarat, Porbandar has a hot semi-arid climate (Köppen BSh) with three distinct seasons: the “cool” from October to March, the “hot” in April, May and early June, and the monsoonal “wet” from mid-June to September.

Almost no rain falls outside the monsoon season, except for a very few late-season tropical cyclones. The most powerful one occurred on 22 October 1975 and produced a storm surge of 4 metres or 13 feet. During the monsoon season, rainfall is exceedingly erratic: Annual rainfall has been as low as 32.2 millimetres or 1.27 inches in 1918 and 34.3 millimetres or 1.35 inches in 1939, but as high as 1,850.6 millimetres or 72.86 inches in 1983—when a cyclone caused over 1,100 millimetres (43.3 in) to fall over four days—and 1,251.7 millimetres or 49.28 inches in 1878.

With a coefficient of variation exceeding fifty percent and an expectation of only 41 percent of mean annual rainfall in the driest year in ten, the Porbandar region is among the most variable in the world—comparable to northern Australia, the Brazilian sertão and the Kiribatese Line Islands.

An illustration of Porbandar's extremely variable rainfall can be seen from 1899 to 1905 when seven successive years produced annual falls of:

- 83.4 millimetres (3.28 in) in 1899
- 1,185.1 millimetres (46.66 in) in 1900
- 99.8 millimetres (3.93 in) in 1901
- 756.9 millimetres (29.80 in) in 1902
- 575.2 millimetres (22.65 in) in 1903
- 124.5 millimetres (4.90 in) in 1904 and
- 134.4 millimetres (5.29 in) in 1905

Porbandar, owing to its coastal location, is the least hot of all major cities in Gujarat: Average high temperatures do not reach 35 °C or 95 °F in any month.

Climate data for Porbandar Airport (1991–2020, extremes 1969–present)
Month	Jan	Feb	Mar	Apr	May	Jun	Jul	Aug	Sep	Oct	Nov	Dec	Year
Record high °C (°F)	36.5 (97.7)	39.0 (102.2)	43.1 (109.6)	44.0 (111.2)	45.5 (113.9)	40.8 (105.4)	35.4 (95.7)	35.4 (95.7)	40.3 (104.5)	41.4 (106.5)	39.7 (103.5)	37.2 (99.0)	45.5 (113.9)
Mean daily maximum °C (°F)	29.4 (84.9)	30.9 (87.6)	33.6 (92.5)	34.1 (93.4)	34.0 (93.2)	33.7 (92.7)	31.6 (88.9)	30.6 (87.1)	31.8 (89.2)	35.0 (95.0)	34.1 (93.4)	31.2 (88.2)	32.5 (90.5)
Mean daily minimum °C (°F)	14.0 (57.2)	16.0 (60.8)	19.6 (67.3)	22.8 (73.0)	26.4 (79.5)	27.9 (82.2)	26.9 (80.4)	25.9 (78.6)	25.0 (77.0)	22.9 (73.2)	19.3 (66.7)	15.6 (60.1)	21.8 (71.2)
Record low °C (°F)	2.0 (35.6)	5.9 (42.6)	8.7 (47.7)	15.0 (59.0)	19.2 (66.6)	20.7 (69.3)	18.7 (65.7)	22.2 (72.0)	19.2 (66.6)	15.3 (59.5)	11.0 (51.8)	6.4 (43.5)	2.0 (35.6)
Average rainfall mm (inches)	0.5 (0.02)	0.2 (0.01)	0.0 (0.0)	0.0 (0.0)	1.0 (0.04)	107.0 (4.21)	280.6 (11.05)	178.4 (7.02)	125.0 (4.92)	10.5 (0.41)	3.9 (0.15)	0.2 (0.01)	707.4 (27.85)
Average rainy days	0.1	0.0	0.0	0.0	0.1	3.6	10.0	8.1	4.4	1.0	0.3	0.0	27.7
Average relative humidity (%) (at 17:30 IST)	38	40	45	54	67	72	78	78	72	52	42	37	56
Source: India Meteorological Department

== Demographics ==
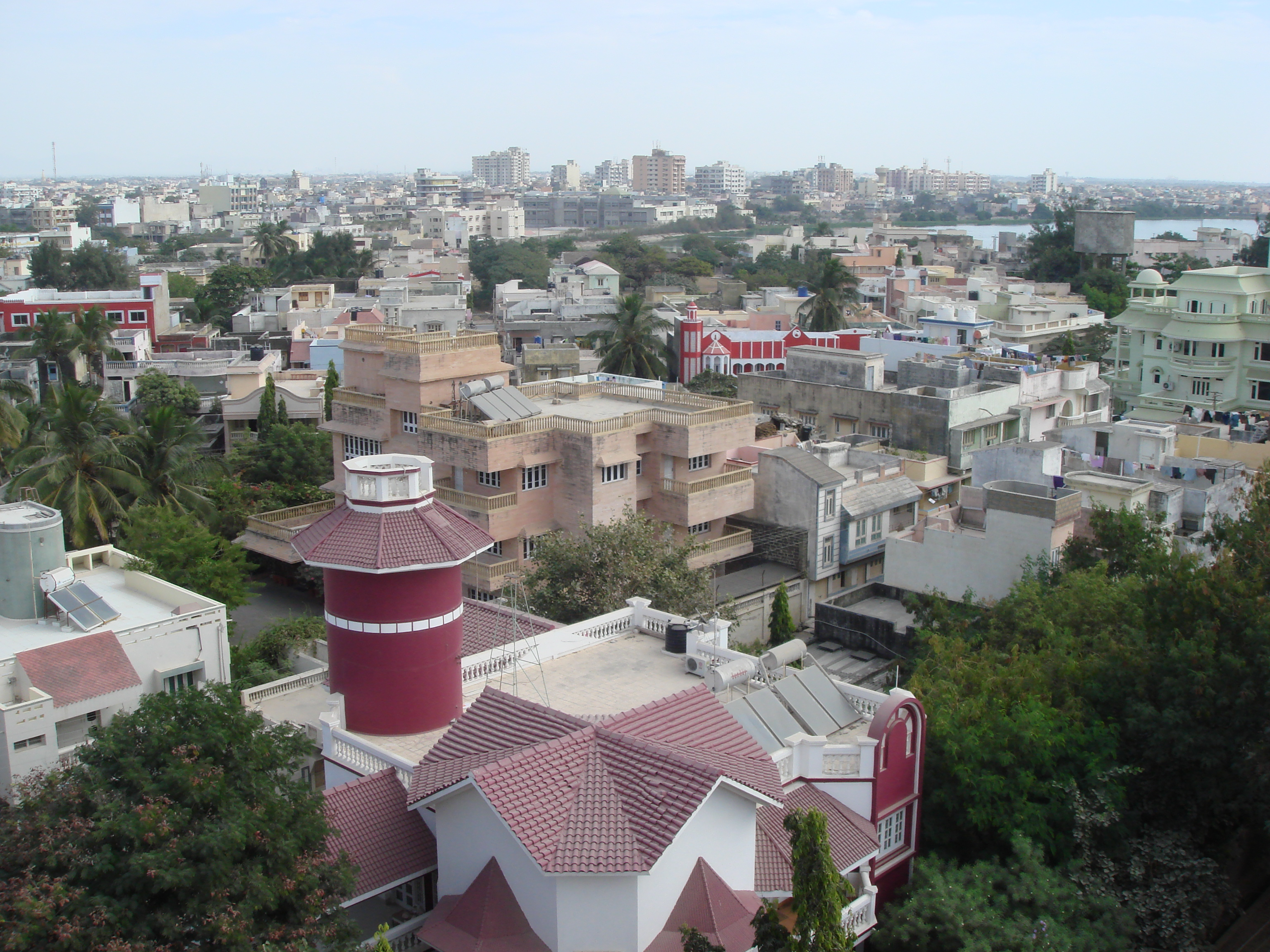
Porbandar city

As of the 2011 census of India, Porbandar (City and urban outgrowth) had a population of 152,760. Males constituted 51.4% of the population and females 48.6%. Porbandar has an average literacy rate of 86.46%, higher than the national average of 74.04%: male literacy is 91.69%, and female literacy is 80.92%. In Porbandar, 9.11% of the population is under 6 years of age.

According to the 2011 census, the population of Porbander contracted 3.85% in 2011. i.e. the growth rate was negative. The sex ration of the city was 943 in 2011.

== Government and politics ==
Porbandar city is governed by Porbandar-Chhaya Municipal Corporation. The Municipal Corporation is responsible for supply of water to the city using Narmada as the main source of water supply. The Municipal Corporation supplies around 14 MLD everyday to the city. As per records available from 2008, the city had a coverage of 39% in terms of water supply connections though the coverage of distribution system was reported as 80%. As per another assessment in the year 2016, Porbandar ranked the lowest in terms the volume of water supplied per capita at 59 lpcd (liters per capita per day) as compared to Gandhinagar which ranked the highest at 245 lpcd. Municipal Corporation is also responsible for waste management in the city and generates about 66 tonnes per day of waste.

The current member of Parliament is Mansukh Mandaviya.

== Culture ==
=== Tourist attractions ===
Hari Mandir

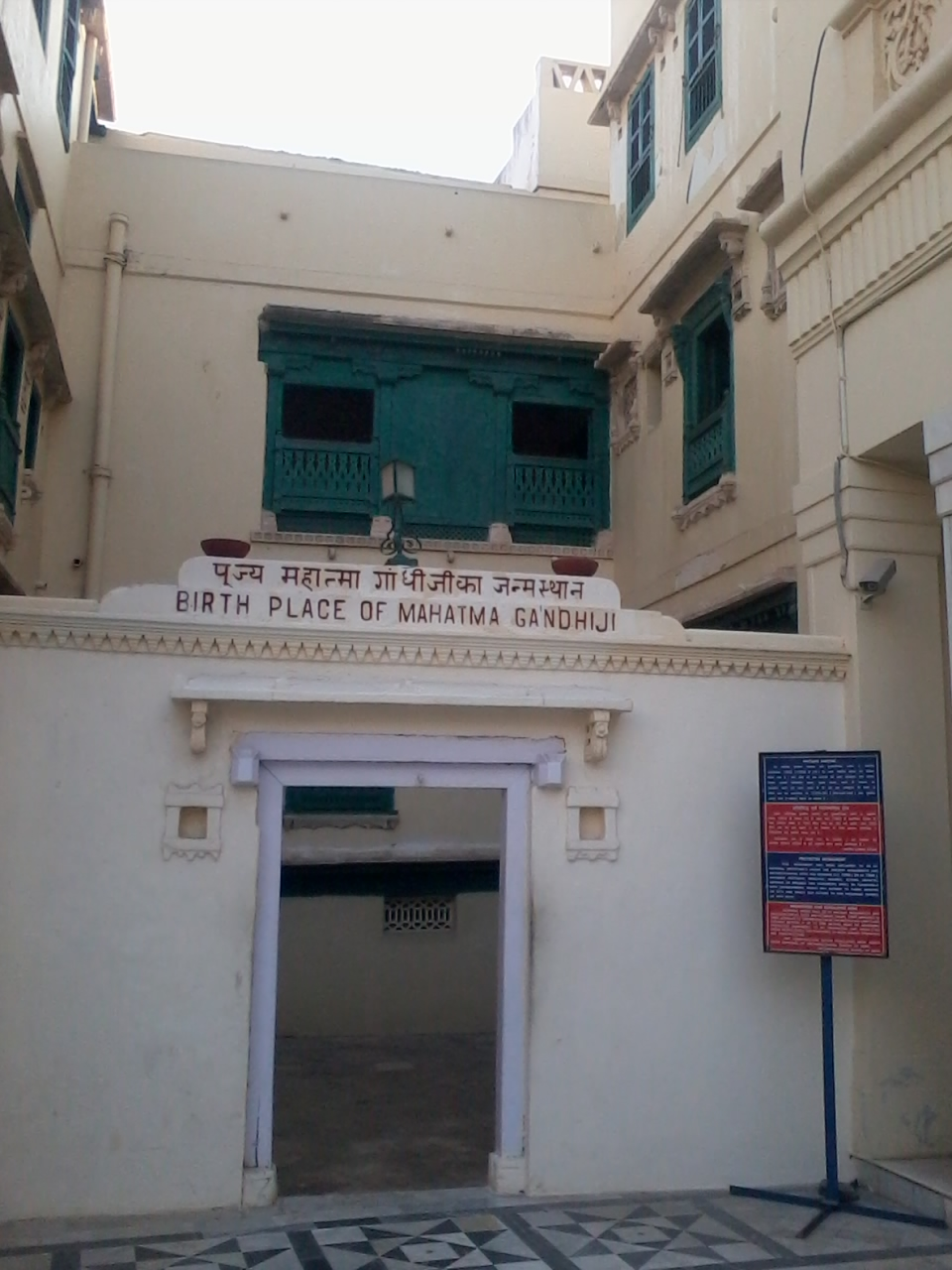
Birthplace of Mahatma Gandhi

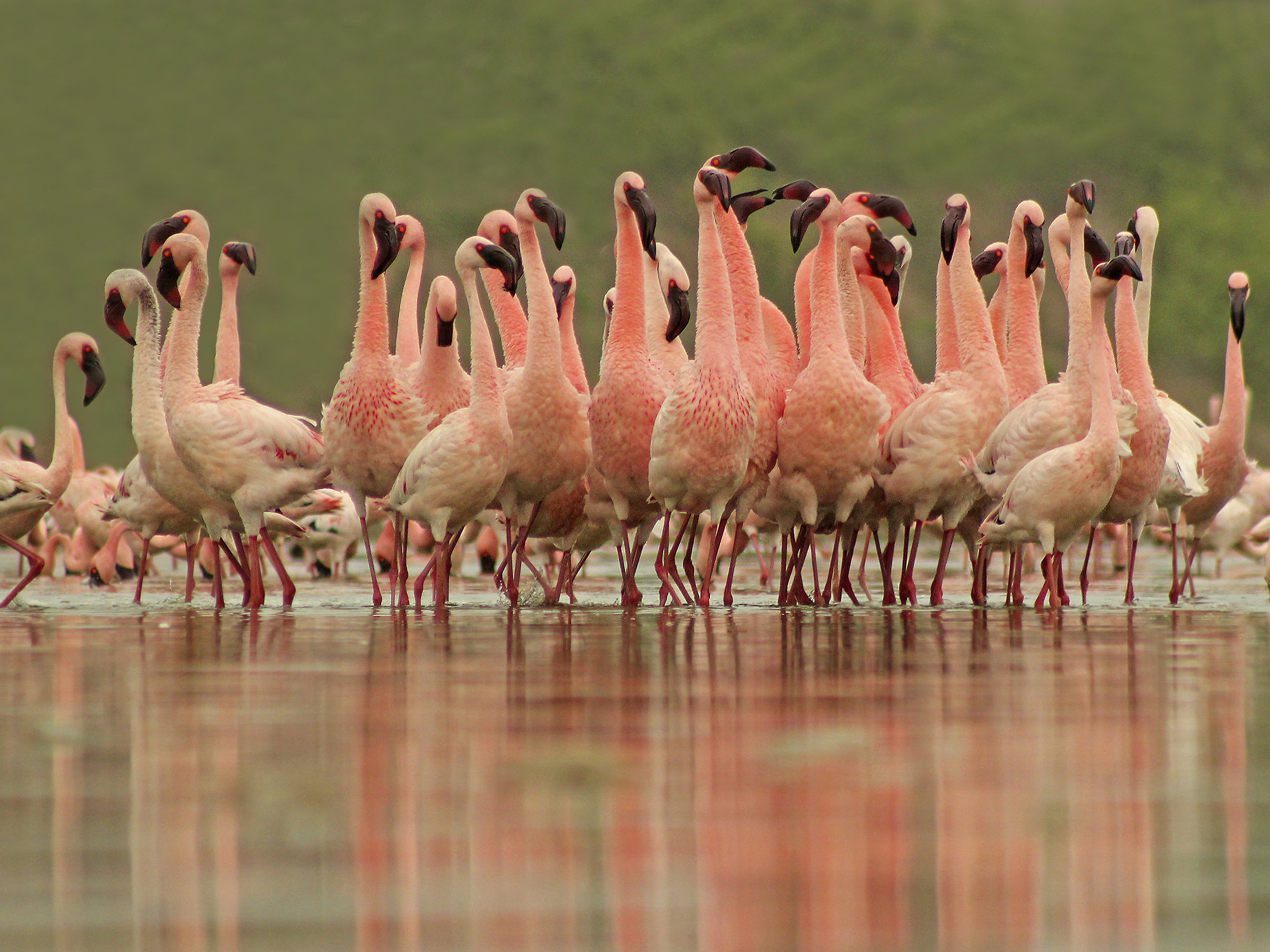
Courtship of Lesser Flamingos at Chhaya rann

- Kirti Mandir, It is located at the Main bazaar, Manek Chowk. Timings 7:30 AM to 7:00 PM Everyday.
- Bharat Mandir (A permanent exhibition of culture, history and geometry about India. It was established by Shri Nanjibhai Kalidas Mehta)
- Tara Mandir (one of the oldest planetariums of India)
- Shree Sudama ji Mandir: One of the few temples built in India in his name
- Shree Hari Mandir or Sandipani temple (handled by Ramesh Oza): a temple complex
- The Huzoor Palace, Daria Raj Mahal Palace, Darbargadh and the Sartanji Choro
- Porbandar Chowpati
- Porbandar Bird Sanctuary (birds like teals, fowls, flamingos, ibis, curlews can be seen)
- Porbandar has many wetlands ideal for birdwatching.
- It is also one of the last coasts remaining where the threatened marine mammal dugong can be found.

== Notable people ==
- Mahatma Gandhi - "The father of the Nation" was born here
- Kasturba Gandhi - wife of Mahatma Gandhi
- Nanji Kalidas Mehta - businessman and philanthropist
- Dr. Savitaben Nanji Kalidas Mehta - Educationist and Manipuri dancer
- Nanabhai Bhatt - film director and producer
- Jaydev Unadkat - Indian cricket player
- Sudama - (also known as Kuchela) friend of Krishna
- Ajay Lalcheta - Oman cricket team Ex-captain & player

== Transport ==
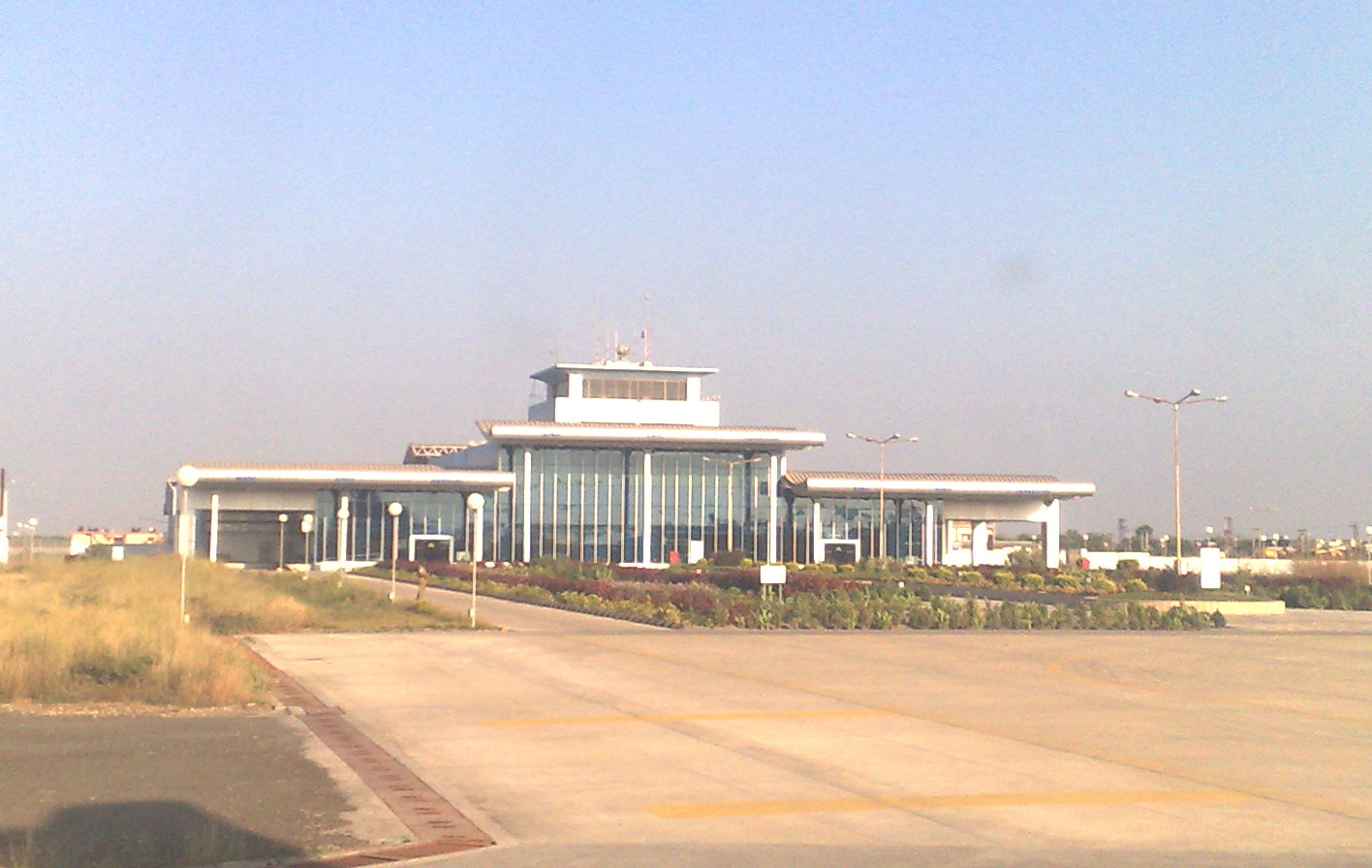
New terminal at Porbandar Airport

Porbandar is well-connected by road, rail and air to cities across the country.

=== Port ===
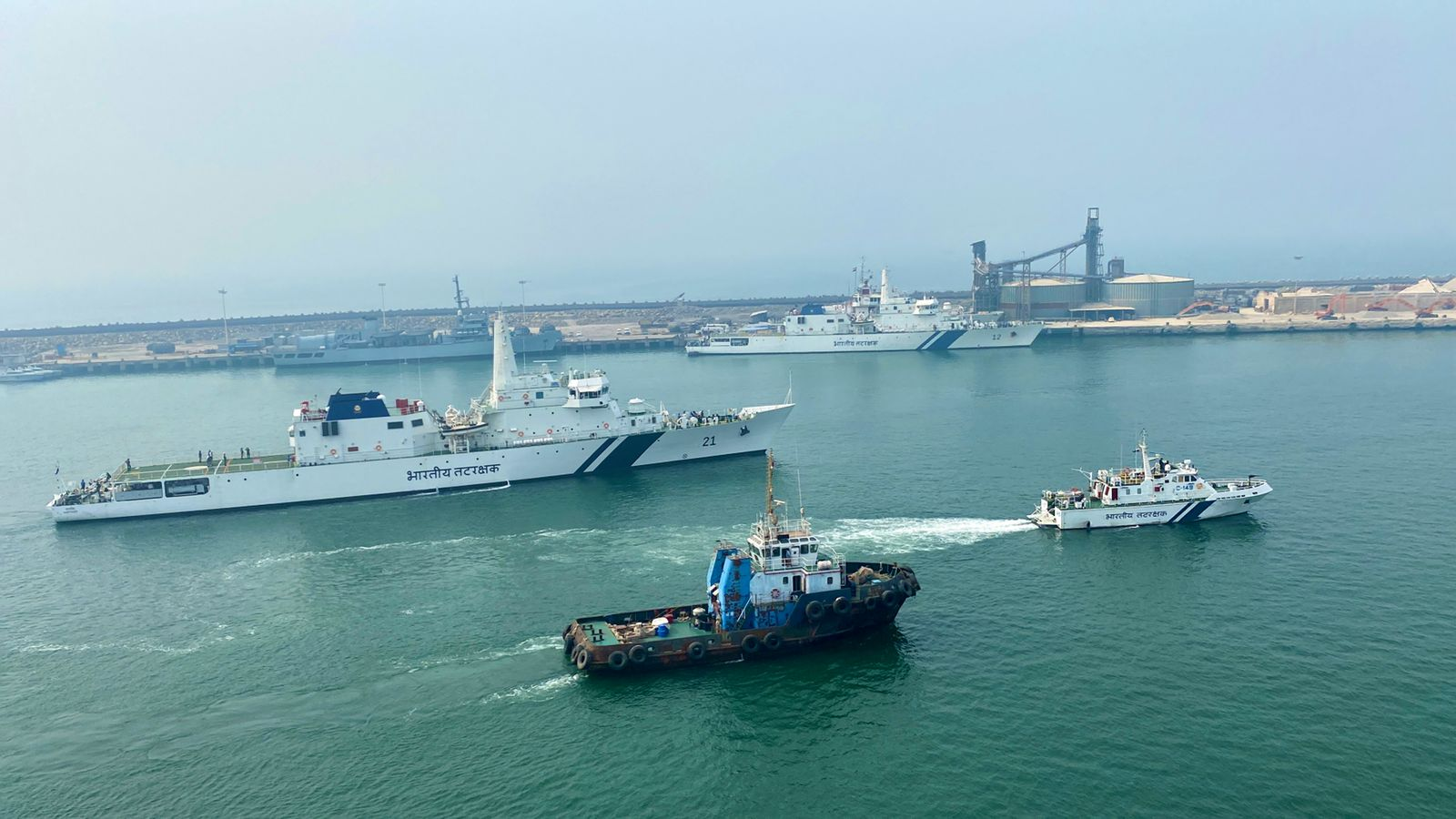
Porbander Port

Porbandar is an ancient port city. At present it has an all-weather medium-sized deep water port, with direct berthing facilities up to 50,000 DWT ships. The Porbandar Coast Guard headquarters, designated as Coast Guard District Headquarters 1 (DHQ-1), is located near RGT College in Porbandar, Gujarat.

INS Sardar Patel is a naval base of the Indian Navy in Porbandar, Gujarat and the Station Headquarters of Naval Station, Porbandar. It provides the logistic support to the Indian Navy units deployed in the Northern Arabian Sea

=== Road ===
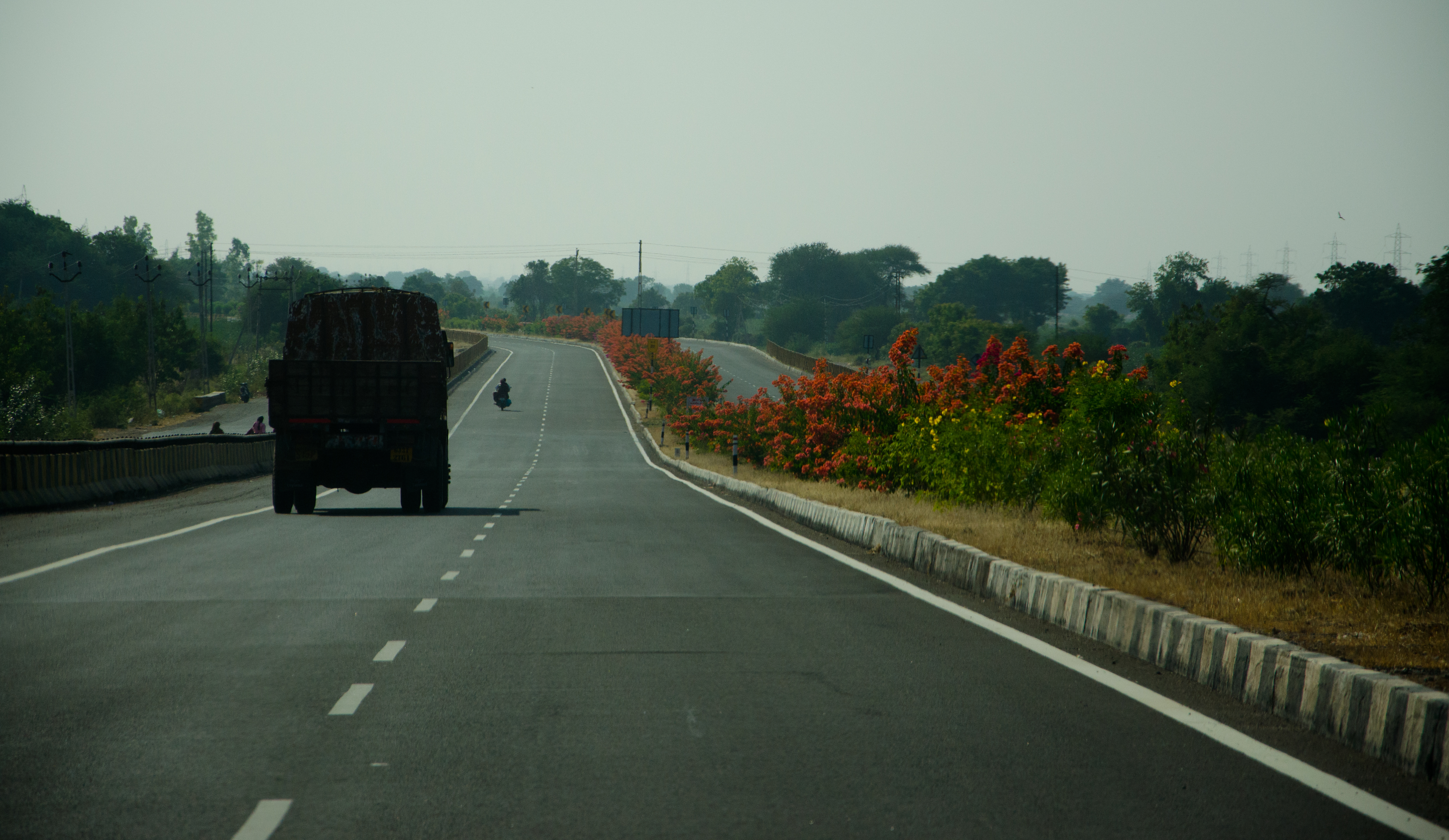
"NH8b" Highway

The city is connected through National Highway 27, connecting to Rajkot and Ahmedabad. National Highway 8E Ext (also known as State Highway 6) connects to Jamnagar, Dwarka in the north and Veraval, Bhavnagar in the south.

Major public transport is covered by the private and government buses.

Many private coaches are available daily to Rajkot, Dwarka, Veraval, Junagadh, Ahmedabad, Jamnagar, Vadodra, Surat, and Mumbai.

=== Rail ===
Porbandar railway station connects Porbandar with major cities of state and the country. There are daily trains to Rajkot (via Jamnagar, Bhanwad and Upleta, Dhoraji, Gondal as well), Somnath (via Junagadh) and Mumbai (via Ahmedabad, Vadodra and Surat). There are also trains to Delhi, Muzaffarpur and Howrah connecting to major cities of Rajasthan, Uttar Pradesh, Vidarbha and West Bengal. A weekly train service connects Kochuveli, Thiruvananthapuram (Kerala) and Secunderabad (Hyderabad) with Porbandar via Mangalore, Calicut, Kochi and Quilon(Kollam).

=== Airport ===
Spicejet Flight was operational from Porbandar to Mumbai twice a week which has been stopped from 18-April-2026

== Sports ==
- Duleep School of Cricket Ground is one of two cricket grounds in Porbandar. It hosted six cricket matches from 1968 to 1986 before falling of the record. The ground is named after great Indian cricketer and Prince of Nawanagar Kumar Shri Duleepsinhji.
- Natwarsinhji Cricket Club Ground is one of two cricket grounds in Porbandar. It hosted a Ranji Trophy match in October 1960 between Saurashtra cricket team and Maharashtra cricket team. The Maharashtra team won by 10 wickets as the match had a low scores with Saurashtra scored 94 & 139 and Maharashtra scored 187 and 47/0. It was scheduled for three days but was completed in two. This was only cricket played on the ground.

== Sources ==
- for more details on Porbandar
- Genealogy of the ruling chiefs of Porbandar
- Application of geological and geophysical methods in marine archaeology and underwater explorations
- Porbandar district
