= Jethwa =

Clan of Rajputs in India

Jethwa (Jethva, Jaitwa or Jethi) is a clan of Rajputs found in Gujarat, India. Jethwa surname is also found amongst the Koli Darji, Kutch Gurjar Kshatriya, and Gurjar Kshatriya Kadias castes of Gujarat.

== Origin ==
Merchant Navy flag of Porbandar State adopted by Jethwas, showing image of Hanuman, from whom the Jethwas claim their descent.

It has been suggested that the Saindhava dynasty ruling eastern part of Saurashtra peninsula is now represented by the present day Jethwa dynasty. It is also suggested that the term Jethwa probably originating from Jayadratha (another name of Saindhawa dynasty), Jyeshtha (the elder branch) or Jyeshthuka from which the region derived its name Jyeshthukadesha.

== Other details and Kuldevis ==
The Jethwa Rajputs belong to the Gautam/Vajas Gotra and their Kuldevi is Vindhyavasini Devi.
