= Narrow-gauge railways in India =

Railway in India

This is a list of former and current narrow-gauge railways in India. All railways except the heritage ones are closed or under conversion/are converted to the nationwide standard 5 ft 6 in (1,676 mm) gauge, under Project Unigauge.

Despite attempts to convert the entire country into broad-gauge all Metro systems and Mumbai–Ahmedabad high-speed rail corridor are done under standard-gauge railway.

== Operational lines ==
Zone	Name	From	To	Operational length	Other information
Southern Railway	Nilgiri Mountain Railway 1000mm	Mettupalayam (MTP)	Udhagamandalam(UAM)	46 km	UNESCO Heritage Site
Western Railway	Patalpani–Kalakund section 1000mm	Patalpani	Kalakund	15 km	
North Eastern Railway	Mailani–Nanpara section 1000mm	Mailani	Nanpara	171 km	
Northern Railway	Kalka–Shimla Railway 762mm	Kalka	Shimla	96.6 km	UNESCO Heritage Site
Northern Railway	Kangra Valley Railway 762mm	Pathankot	Joginder Nagar	164 km	UNESCO Heritage Site (tentative list)
Western Railway	Bilimora–Waghai section 762mm	Bilimora	Waghai	63 km	Heritage airconditioned train service in operation since 2021.
Northeast Frontier Railway	Darjeeling Himalayan Railway 610mm	New Jalpaiguri (NJP)	Darjeeling	83.9 km	UNESCO Heritage Site
Central Railway	Matheran Hill Railway 610mm	Neral	Matheran	21 km	UNESCO Heritage Site (tentative list)

== Defunct lines ==
=== 1,000 mm (3 ft 3 3/8 in) ===
- Assam Bengal Railway (converted to 5 ft 6 in (1,676 mm) broad gauge)
- Bareilly–Pilibheet Provincial State Railway (converted to 5 ft 6 in (1,676 mm) broad gauge)
- Bengal Nagpur Railway (converted to 5 ft 6 in (1,676 mm) broad gauge)
- Bhavnagar State Railway (converted to 5 ft 6 in (1,676 mm) broad gauge)
- Bikaner State Railway (converted to 5 ft 6 in (1,676 mm) broad gauge)
- Cawnpore–Barabanki Railway (converted to 5 ft 6 in (1,676 mm) broad gauge)
- Cochin State Forest Tramway (closed)
- Cooch Behar State Railway (converted to 5 ft 6 in (1,676 mm) broad gauge)
- Dhrangadhra Railway (converted to 5 ft 6 in (1,676 mm) broad gauge)
- Gaekwar's Baroda State Railway (most lines converted to 5 ft 6 in (1,676 mm) broad gauge)
- Gondal State Railway (converted to 5 ft 6 in (1,676 mm) broad gauge)
- Jaipur State Railway (converted to 5 ft 6 in (1,676 mm) broad gauge)
- Jamnagar & Dwarka Railway (converted to 5 ft 6 in (1,676 mm) broad gauge)
- Jetalsar–Rajkot Railway (converted to 5 ft 6 in (1,676 mm) broad gauge)
- Jodhpur State Railway (converted to 5 ft 6 in (1,676 mm) broad gauge)
- Jodhpur–Bikaner Railway (converted to 5 ft 6 in (1,676 mm) broad gauge)
- Junagadh State Railway (converted to 5 ft 6 in (1,676 mm) broad gauge)
- Kathiawar State Railway (converted to 5 ft 6 in (1,676 mm) broad gauge)
- Lucknow–Sitapur–Seramow Provincial State Railway (converted to 5 ft 6 in (1,676 mm) broad gauge)
- Mashrak–Thawe Extension Railway (converted to 5 ft 6 in (1,676 mm) broad gauge)
- Morvi Railway (converted to 5 ft 6 in (1,676 mm) broad gauge)
- Mysore State Railway (converted to 5 ft 6 in (1,676 mm) broad gauge)
- Nagpur Chhattisgarh Railway (converted to 5 ft 6 in (1,676 mm) broad gauge)
- Nawabganj Sugar Factory Railway (converted to 5 ft 6 in (1,676 mm) broad gauge)
- Nizam's Guaranteed State Railway (converted to 5 ft 6 in (1,676 mm) broad gauge)
- Okhamandal State Railway (converted to 5 ft 6 in (1,676 mm) broad gauge)
- Oudh and Rohilkhand Railway (converted to 5 ft 6 in (1,676 mm) broad gauge)
- Porbandar State Railway (converted to 5 ft 6 in (1,676 mm) broad gauge)
- Rajputana–Malwa Railway (converted to 5 ft 6 in (1,676 mm) broad gauge)
- Rohilkund and Kumaon Railway (converted to 5 ft 6 in (1,676 mm) broad gauge)
- Southern Mahratta Railway (converted to 5 ft 6 in (1,676 mm) broad gauge)
- West of India Portuguese Railway (converted to 5 ft 6 in (1,676 mm) broad gauge)

=== 2 ft 6 in (762 mm) ===
- Barsi Light Railway (converted to 5 ft 6 in (1,676 mm) broad gauge)
- Bengal Provincial Railway (closed)
- Bhavnagar Tramway (closed)
- Cherra Companyganj State Railways (closed)
- Cooch Behar State Railway (converted to 5 ft 6 in (1,676 mm) broad gauge)
- Cutch State Railway (converted to 5 ft 6 in (1,676 mm) broad gauge)
- Dehri Rohtas Light Railway (converted to 5 ft 6 in (1,676 mm) broad gauge)
- Dholpur–Sarmathura Railway (being converted to 5 ft 6 in (1,676 mm) broad gauge)
- Gaekwar's Baroda State Railway (converted to 5 ft 6 in (1,676 mm) broad gauge)
- Martin's Light Railways (converted to 5 ft 6 in (1,676 mm) broad gauge)
- Mayurbhanj State Railway (converted to 5 ft 6 in (1,676 mm) broad gauge)
- McLeod's Light Railways (converted to 5 ft 6 in (1,676 mm) broad gauge)
- Morvi Railway (converted to 5 ft 6 in (1,676 mm) broad gauge)
- Nasik Tramway (closed)
- Pachora–Jamner railway (to be converted to 5 ft 6 in (1,676 mm) broad gauge)
- Parlakimedi Light Railway (converted to 5 ft 6 in (1,676 mm) broad gauge)
- Rajpipla State Railway (converted to 5 ft 6 in (1,676 mm) broad gauge)
- Satpura Railway (under conversion to 5 ft 6 in (1,676 mm) broad gauge)
- Shakuntala Railway (under conversion to 5 ft 6 in (1,676 mm) broad gauge) (Yavatmal - Murtizapur - Achalpur section and Arvi - Pulgaon section).
- Abhanpur - Rajim/Dhamtari (under conversion to 5 ft 6 in (1,676 mm) broad gauge)
- Itwari - Nagbhir (under conversion to 5 ft 6 in (1,676 mm) broad gauge)

=== 2 ft (610 mm) ===
- Gwalior Light Railway (converted to 5 ft 6 in (1,676 mm) broad gauge)
- Jorehaut Provincial Railway (converted to 5 ft 6 in (1,676 mm) broad gauge)
- Kundala Valley Railway (closed)
- Martin's Light Railways (converted to 5 ft 6 in (1,676 mm) broad gauge)
- Ryam Sugar Factory Railway (converted to 5 ft 6 in (1,676 mm) broad gauge)
