= List of railway companies in India =

This is list of railway companies in India. Among these, the Indian Railway Catering and Tourism Corporation (IRCTC), a public sector undertaking, runs an official ticketing website which is the most-used government website in India; as of 2025,

== Current railway companies ==
- Dedicated Freight Corridor Corporation of India (DFCCIL)
- Indian Railway Catering and Tourism Corporation (IRCTC)
- Indian Railway Stations Development Corporation
- Ircon International
- Rail Vikas Nigam
- Konkan Railway Corporation
- Mumbai Railway Vikas Corporation

== Defunct railway companies ==
- Ahmedabad–Dholka Railway
- Ahmedabad–Prantij Railway
- Alnavar–Dandeli Railway
- Amravati State Railway
- Amritsar–Patti Railway
- Assam Behar Railway
- Assam Bengal Railway
- Assam Railways and Trading Company
- Assam Railway
- Assam Railway Link Project
- Bahawalpur Royal Railway
- Barharwa–Azimganj–Katwa Railway
- Baria State Railway
- Barsi Light Railway
- Barun–Daltonganj Railway
- Bengal and North Western Railway
- Bengal and Assam Railway
- Bengal Central Railway
- Bengal Dooars Railway
- Bengal Provincial Railway
- Bengal Nagpur Railway
- Bezwada Extension Railway
- Bhagalpur Badli Railway
- Bhavnagar State Railway
- Bhavnagar Tramway
- Bhopal State Railway
- Bikaner State Railway
- Bilaspur–Etawa Provincial State Railway
- Bina–Goona–Baran Railway
- Birur–Shimoga Railway
- Bombay Port Trust Railway
- Bombay, Agra and Delhi Railway
- Bombay, Baroda and Central India Railway
- Bowringpet–Chikballapur Railway
- Brihanmumbai Electric Supply and Transport
- Calcutta Chord Railway
- Calcutta Port Commissioners' Railway
- Calcutta Tramways Company
- Carnatic Railway
- Cawnpore Tramways and General Electric Works
- Cawnpore–Barabanki Railway
- Central Indian Coalfields Railway
- Central Provinces Railway
- Central Salsette Tramway
- Chaparmukh Silghat Railway
- Cherra Companyganj State Railways
- Chickjajur–Chitaldrug Railway
- Chikballapur–Bangalore City Railway
- Cooch Behar State Railway
- Cutch State Railway
- Dacca State Railway
- Dandot Light Railway
- Darbhanga State Railway
- Darjeeling Himalayan Railway
- Daund–Baramati Railway
- Dehri Rohtas Light Railway
- Delhi Electric Tramways and Lighting Company
- Delhi Railway
- Delhi–Umballa–Kalka Railway
- Deoghur Railway
- Dhampur–Sherkot Tramway
- Dholka–Dhandhuka Railway
- Dholpur State Railway
- Dhond–Manmad State Railway
- Dhrangadra Railway
- Dibru–Sadiya Railway
- Drangdhara State Railway
- East Bengal State Railway
- East Coast State Railway
- East India Tramway Company
- East Indian Railway
- Eastern Bengal Railway
- Eastern Punjab Railway
- Gaekwar's Baroda State Railway
- Gaekwar's Dabhoi Railway
- Gaekwar's Mehsana Railway
- Godhra–Rutlam–Nagda Railway
- Gondal State Railway
- Gondia Chanda Railway
- Great Indian Peninsula Railway
- Great Southern of India Railway
- Guntakal–Mysore Frontier Railway
- Guzerat Railway Company
- Gwalior Light Railway
- Hardwar–Dehra Railway
- Hindupur–Yesvantpur Railway
- Holkar State Railway
- Hooghly Katwa Railway
- Hospet Kottur Railway
- Hyderabad–Jodhpur Railway
- Indian Branch Railway
- Indian Government Railway
- Indian Midland Railway
- Indian Mill and Railway Company
- Indus Flotilla Railway
- Indus Valley State Railway
- Jaipur State Railway
- Jamnagar and Dwarka Railway
- Jessore–Jhenidah Light Railway
- Jetalsar–Rajkot Railway
- Jhansi–Manikpore State Railway
- Jind–Panipat Railway
- Jodhpur–Bikaner Railway
- Jodhpur State Railway
- Jorehaut Provincial Railway
- Jubbulpore Gondia Extension Railway
- Junagadh State Railway
- Kalka–Shimla Railway
- Kandla Port Railway
- Kandhar State Railway
- Kangra Valley Railway
- Karaikkal–Peralam Railway
- Katakhal Lalbazar Railway
- Kathiawar State Railway
- Katni–Umaria Provincial State Railway
- Kaunia–Dharlla State Railway
- Kaunia–Kurigram Railway
- Khamgaon State Railway
- Khanai–Hindubagh Railway
- Khijadiya–Dhari Railway
- Khulna–Bagerhat Railway
- Kolar Gold Fields Railway
- Kolhapur State Railway
- Kundala Valley Railway
- Kushalgarh–Kohat–Thal Railway
- Larkana–Jacobabad Railway
- Ledo and Tikak Margherita Colliery Railway
- Lucknow–Bareilly State Railway
- Ludhiana–Dhuri–Jakhal Railway
- Madras and Southern Mahratta Railway
- Madras Electric Tramways
- Madras Port Trust Railways
- Madras Railway
- Mandra–Bhon Railway
- Martin's Light Railways
- Mashrak–Thawe Extension Railway
- Matheran Hill Railway
- Mayurbhanj State Railway
- McLeod's Light Railways
- Mewar State Railway
- Morvi Railway
- Muttra–Achnera Provincial State Railway
- Muttra–Hathras Provincial State Railway
- Mymensingh–Bhairab Bazar Railway
- Mysore State Railway
- Mysore–Arsikere Railway
- Mysore–Nanjangud Railway
- Nagda–Ujjain Railway
- Nagpur Chhattisgarh Railway
- Nagpur–Chhindwara Railway
- Nainpur–Mandla Branch Railway
- Nanjangud–Chamrajnagar Railway
- Nasik Tramway
- Nepal–Janakpur Railway
- Nilgiri Mountain Railway
- Nizam's Guaranteed State Railway
- Noakhali Railway
- North Western State Railway
- Northeast Frontier Railways
- Nowshera–Durgai Railway
- Okhamandal State Railway
- Oudh and Rohilkhand Railway
- Oudh and Tirhut Railway
- Oudh State Railway
- Pachora Jamner Railway
- Palanpur–Deesa Railway
- Panposh–Raipura Railway
- Parlakimedi Light Railway
- Pathankot–Mukerian Link Project
- Patiala State Monorail Trainways
- Patna and Gaya State Railway
- Patna Tramways
- Patri State Railway
- Petlad–Cambay Railway
- Piplod–Devgad–Baria Railway
- Pondicherry Railway
- Punjab Northern State Railway
- Punjab Railway
- Purulia Ranchi Light Railway
- Raipur Dhamtari Railway
- Rajkot–Beti Tramway
- Rajpipla State Railway
- Rajputana–Malwa Railway
- Ranaghat–Krishnanagar Railway
- Rohilkund and Kumaon Railway
- Sangli State Railway
- Santipur–Nabadwip Light Railway
- Sara–Sirajgunj Railway
- Satpura Railway
- Saurashtra Railway
- Scinde Railways
- Scinde, Punjab & Delhi Railway
- Scindia State Railway
- Segowlie–Roxaul Railway
- Shakuntala Railway
- Shoranur–Cochin Railway
- Sind Sagaar Railway
- Sind–Pishin State Railway
- South Behar Railway
- South Indian Railway
- Southern Mahratta Railway
- Southern Punjab Railway
- Tanjore District Board Railway
- Tapti Valley Railway
- Tarkessuar Railways
- Tezpore–Balipara Light Railway
- Tinnevelly–Quilon Railway
- Tirhut Railway
- Trans–Baluchistan Railway
- Tumsar–Tirodi Light Railway
- Udaipur–Chittorgarh Railway
- Vijapur–Kalol–Kadi Railway
- Visakhapatnam Port Trust Railway
- Wardha State Coal Railway
- West of India Portuguese Railway
- Zhob Valley Railway
