= Indian locomotive class YD =

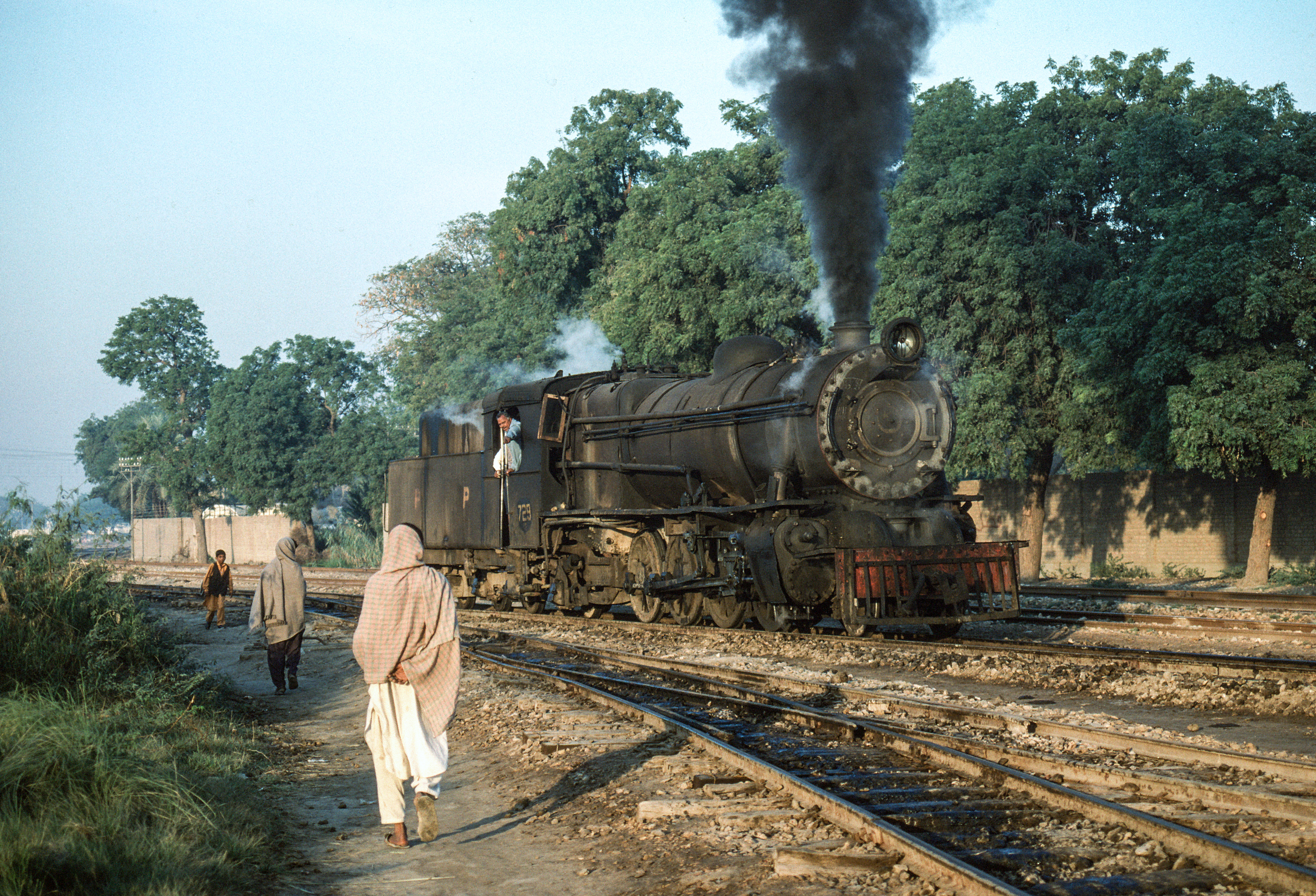
- Pakistan Railways 729, an oil-fired Nippon Sharyo product, at Mirpur Khas, 1993
Type and origin
- Power type: Steam
- Builder: AEG-Borsig; Henschel and Son; Nasmyth, Wilson and Company; Nippon Sharyo; Swiss Locomotive and Machine Works; Skoda Works; Vulcan Foundry; BB&CI Ajmer Works
- Build date: 1927-1953
- Total produced: At least 270
Specifications
- Configuration
  - Whyte: 2-8-2
  - UIC: 1'D1' h2
- Gauge: 1,000 mm (3 ft 3 3/8 in)
- Leading dia.: 762 mm (2 ft 6.0 in)
- Coupled dia.: 1,219 mm (4 ft 0 in)
- Trailing dia.: 762 mm (2 ft 6.0 in)
- Wheelbase
  - Engine: 8,458 mm (27 ft 9.0 in)
  - Coupled: 4,089 mm (13 ft 5.0 in)
  - incl. tender: 15,367 mm (50 ft 5.0 in)
- Length
  - Over buffers: 18,313 mm (60 ft 1.0 in)
- Height: 3,429 mm (11 ft 3.0 in)
- Axle load: 10.2 t (10.0 long tons; 11.2 short tons)
- Adhesive weight: 40.4 t (39.8 long tons; 44.5 short tons)
- Empty weight: 52 t (51 long tons; 57 short tons)
- Service weight: 58 t (57 long tons; 64 short tons)
- Total weight: 95.9 t (94.4 long tons; 105.7 short tons)
- Fuel type: Coal
- Fuel capacity: 4.5 t (4.4 long tons; 5.0 short tons)
- Water cap.: 13.6 m^{3} (480 cu ft)
- Firebox
  - Grate area: 2.42 m^{2} (26.0 sq ft)
- Boiler pressure: 12.7 bar (184 psi)
- Heating surface: 117.2 m^{2} (1,262 sq ft)
- Superheater
  - Heating area: 36.6 m^{2} (394 sq ft)
- Cylinders: Two, outside
- Cylinder size: 432 mm × 610 mm (17.0 in × 24.0 in)
- Valve gear: Walschaerts
Performance figures
- Maximum speed: 56 km/h (35 mph)
- Tractive effort
  - Starting: 86.8 kN (19,500 lbf)
Career
- Numbers: See table

The YD class was a class of 2-8-2 tender locomotives built for metre-gauge railways of the British Raj, designed accordingly to the Indian Railway Standard (IRS).

== History ==
In early 1927, Vulcan Foundry built ten 2-8-2 goods locomotives to the Assam Bengal Railway. Initially unclassified, they would later be known as the class YD/1, as from mid-1927, the YD class was mass-produced for other railway companies in British India as a further development from the original ten examples. The YD/1 were somewhat smaller, and were equipped with three-axle tenders, as opposed to the four-axle bogie tenders used on the YDs.

Between 1927 and 1953, a total of at least 270 locomotives were built by eight manufacturers in Germany, United Kingdom, India, Japan and Czechoslovakia.

=== India ===
When Indian Railways introduced a new numbering scheme in March 1957, the 143 locomotives remaining in service at the time were renumbered 30154–30296. The ten YD/1 class locomotives 30297–30306. By 1975, 133 YD class locomotives were in service with three regional zones of Indian Railways. 71 were allocated to the South Central Railway zone, 45 to Western Railways (including the ten YD/1) and 17 to Southern Railways. Some of the locomotives were in service until the 1990s.

=== Pakistan ===
During the partition of India, several examples came under the ownership of Pakistan Railways. In 1952, Nippon Sharyo of Japan built 25 near-identical locomotives with oil-firing, and were put to work on passenger trains in addition to freight trains. When East Pakistan gained independence as Bangladesh in 1974, the YDs allocated to East Pakistan were inherited by the Bangladesh Railway. Many were in service until the end of steam traction in Pakistan in the 1990s.

=== Burma ===
The colony of Burma was part of the British Raj until 1937, and Burma Railways was under jurisdiction of Indian Railways at the same time. As such, the YD class were used in Burma. After Burma became a separate crown colony and Burma Railways came under the control of the new government, its rolling stock including the YDs were taken over, and a further 20 were acquired in 1949. Some were still in service in 2014.

== Design ==
The YD class shared the same boiler as the YC class, albeit shorter and with a smaller firebox compared to the latter. The class YD's axle load was 10.2 t, which is the same as with the YB class 4-6-2 locomotives. A heavier 12.2 t axle load variant known as the class YE was proposed, but never built.

Not only the YD/1 class locomotives had differences, some batches of class YD locomotives also had differences. Locomotives that were built in 1933 and 1934 were fitted with poppet valves, while two built for the Gondal State Railway originally did not have superheaters, which were later retrofitted in 1951. Pakistan's Japanese-built locomotives burn oil as fuel.

== Table of locomotives ==
This list may not be complete. Some sources have conflicting statements about the quantity of locomotives produced and operators who initially used them. (Note: Unless otherwise stated, this list is based on the sources listed in the "Bibliography" section, and AEG-Borsig, SLM and Vulcan Foundry production lists.)

Builder	Year	Quantity	Serial number	Operator	Running number
Vulcan Foundry	1927	10	4081–4090	Assam Bengal Railway	201–210 (YD/1)
Vulcan Foundry	1927	5	4164–4168	Assam Bengal Railway	211–215
Nasmyth, Wilson and Company	1927	2	1505–1506	Bombay, Baroda and Central India Railway	283, 324
Nasmyth, Wilson and Company	1927	2	1507–1508	Madras and Southern Mahratta Railway	430–431
Nasmyth, Wilson and Company	1927	7	1509–1515	Burma Railways	427–433
Škoda	1928	17	494–510	Madras and Southern Mahratta Railway	448–449, 481, 600–613
Vulcan Foundry	1928	7	4226–4232	Burma Railways	434–440
Vulcan Foundry	1928	16	4233–4248	Madras and Southern Mahratta Railway	432–447
Vulcan Foundry	1928	1	4249	Mysore State Railway	131
Vulcan Foundry	1928	10	4250–4259	South Indian Railway	YD 1–10
Vulcan Foundry	1929	4	4399–4402	Assam Bengal Railway	N/A
Vulcan Foundry	1929	10	4403–4412	Nizam’s Guaranteed State Railway	220–229
Nasmyth, Wilson and Company	1929	1	1562	Gondal State Railway	1
Swiss Locomotive and Machine Works (SLM)	1929	18	3261–3278	Burma Railways	441–458
SLM	1929	5	3279–3283	Bombay, Baroda and Central India Railway	125, 181, 345, 915, 916
SLM	1929	4	3284–3287	South Indian Railway	YD 11–14
Henschel & Sohn	1929	29	21544–72	Burma Railways	N/A
AEG-Borsig	1930	1	4447	Gondal State Railway	2
AEG-Borsig	1931	4	4573–4576	Madras and Southern Mahratta Railway	482, 616–618
AEG-Borsig	1931	6	4577–4582	South Indian Railway	YD 15–20
AEG-Borsig	1931	2	4583–4584	Madras and Southern Mahratta Railway	614–615
BB&CI	1931	15	N/A	Bombay, Baroda and Central India Railway	142–156
BB&CI	1932	2	N/A	Bombay, Baroda and Central India Railway	N/A
BB&CI	1932	8	N/A	Mysore State Railway	134–141
BB&CI	1933/34	15	N/A	Bombay, Baroda and Central India Railway	357–371
Vulcan Foundry	1948	5	5660–5664	Nizam’s Guaranteed State Railway	206–210
Vulcan Foundry	1949	10	5705–5714	Mysore State Railway	142–151
Vulcan Foundry	1949	20	5715–5734	Burma Railways	956–975
Vulcan Foundry	1949	9	5735–5743	Nizam’s Guaranteed State Railway	211–219
Nippon Sharyo	1952/53	25	N/A	Pakistan Railways	N/A

== Other YDs ==
In 1942, two locomotives similar to the YD class built by W. G. Bagnall for the Companhia Ferroviária São Paulo-Paraná in Brazil were requisitioned by the War Department and shipped to India in 1943. The Mysore State Railway and the Jodhpur State Railway each received one locomotive. Both locomotives were designated as class YD by Indian Railways, although they bore significant differences. Other than their external appearance, these two locomotives had larger cylinders and fireboxes. Both were in service in the South Central Railway zone as of 1975.

The Jordan Hedjaz Railway (JHR) had 3 locomotives built in 1951 to the design of the YD class from Robert Stephenson and Hawthorns, and received running numbers 21–23 (RSH 7431—33/1951).

In 1955, Vulcan Foundry built three locomotives similar to the class YD design, albeit with a shorter 2-6-2 wheel arrangement, for the North Borneo Railway (NBR). These locomotives were numbered 14–16 (VF 6274–76/1955) on the NBR, and were among the last Vulcan-built steam locomotives.

== Preservation ==
Several locomotives are on display in various railway museums in India, Bangladesh, Myanmar and Pakistan.

Of the 3 Jordanian YDs, only JHR 22 (RSH 7432/1951) was scrapped aside from its tender, which still is at Amman station. JHR 21 (RSH 7431/1951) stands derelict outside Amman station, and JHR 23 (RSH 7433/1951) is preserved.

All three NBR Vulcan Foundry locomotives are preserved. NBR 15 was maintained in working order and chartered for tourist trains, which, however, since the COVID-19 pandemic, remain suspended as of 2025.

== Gallery ==
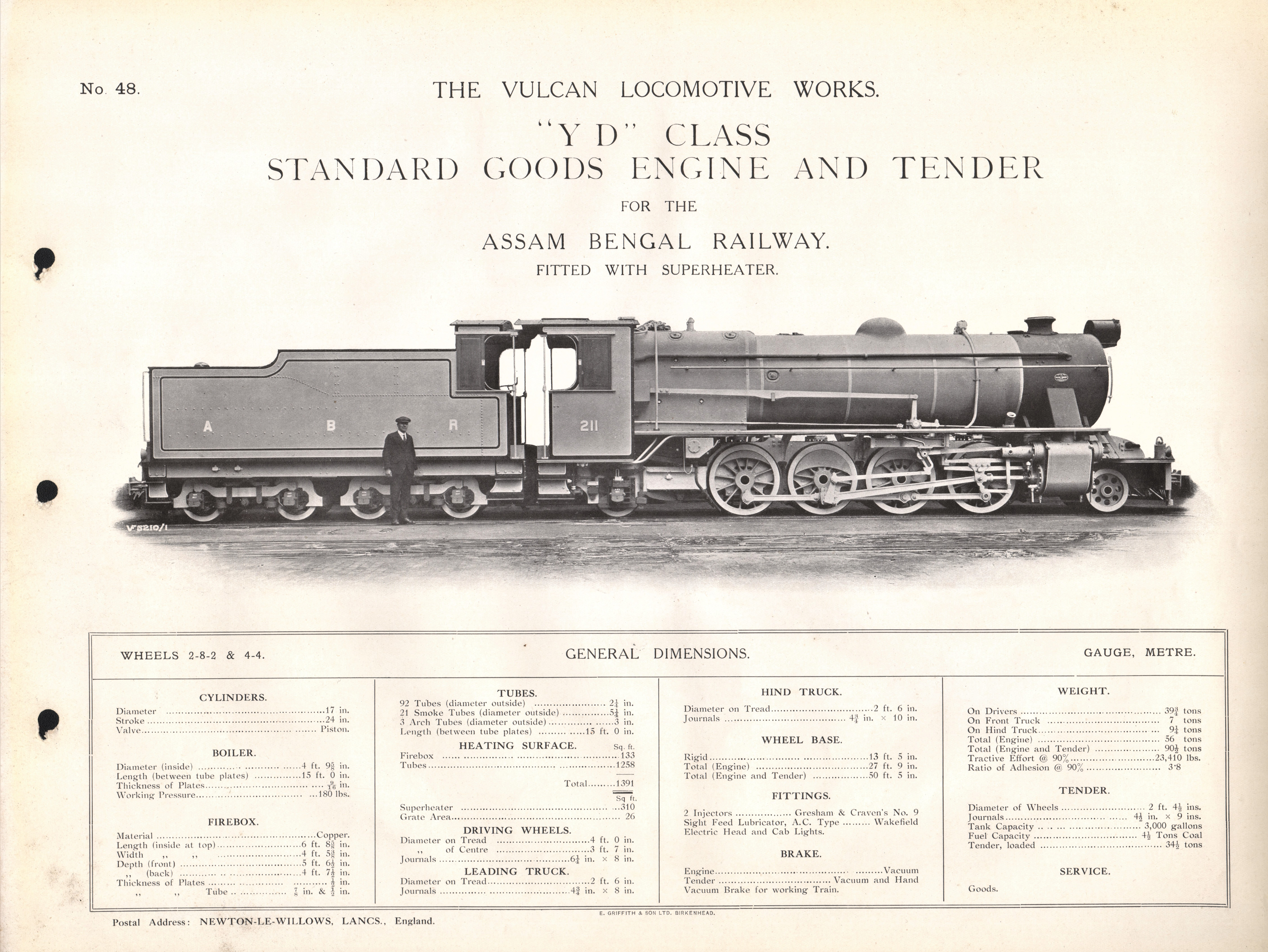
Vulcan Foundry's specification sheet of the class YD

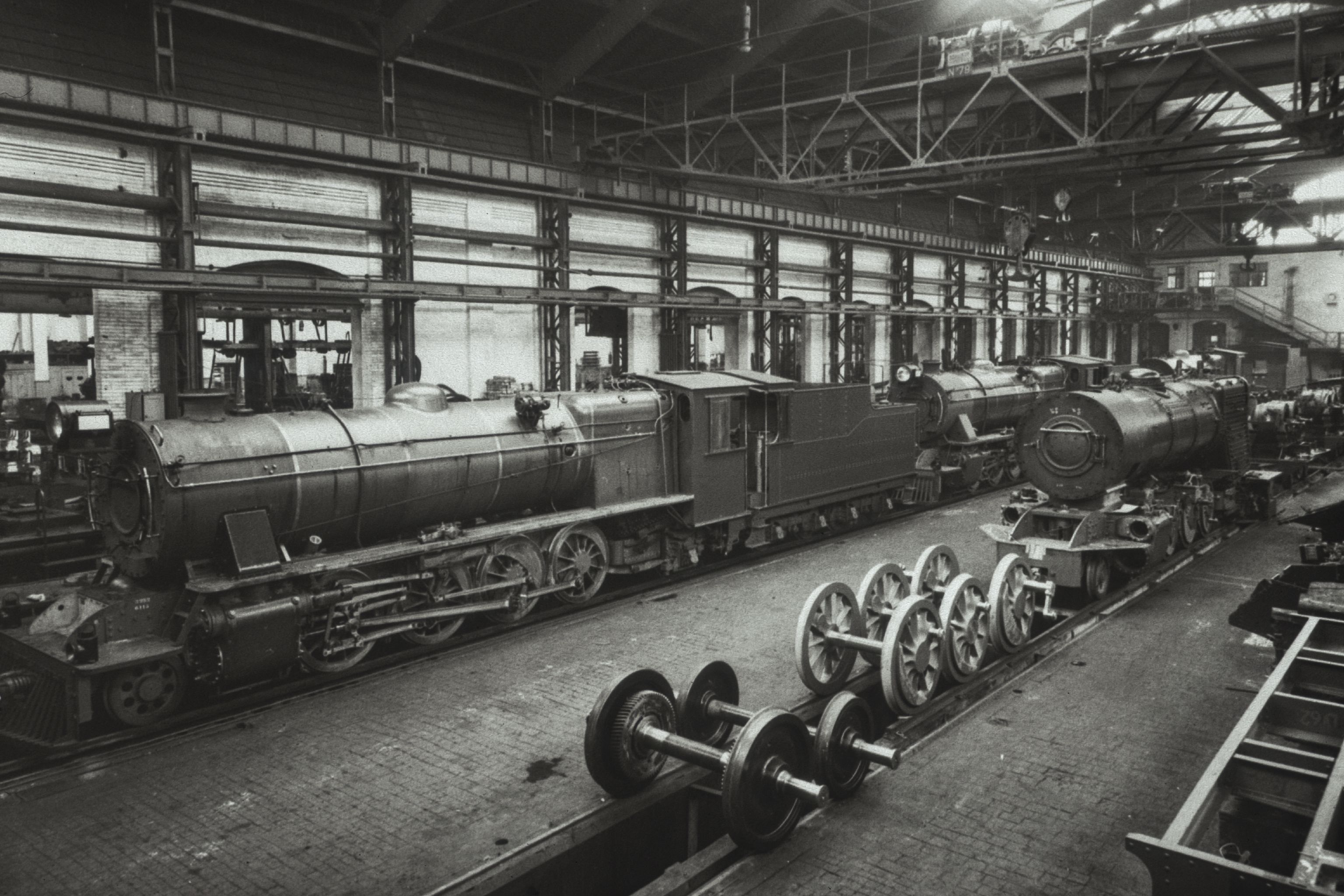
Locomotives being built by Swiss Locomotive and Machine Works, 1929

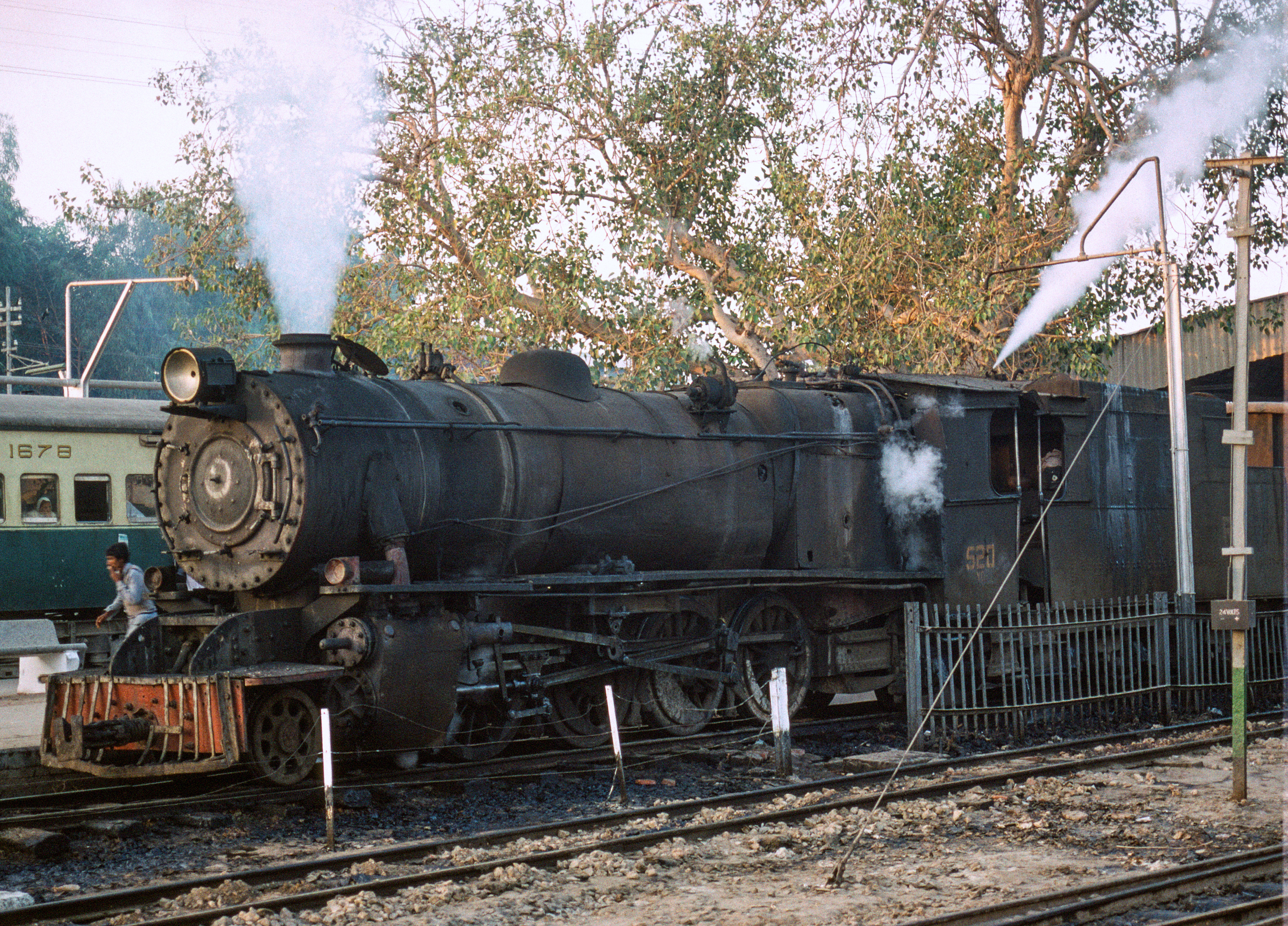
Pakistan Railways 520 (built in 1932) in service in 1993

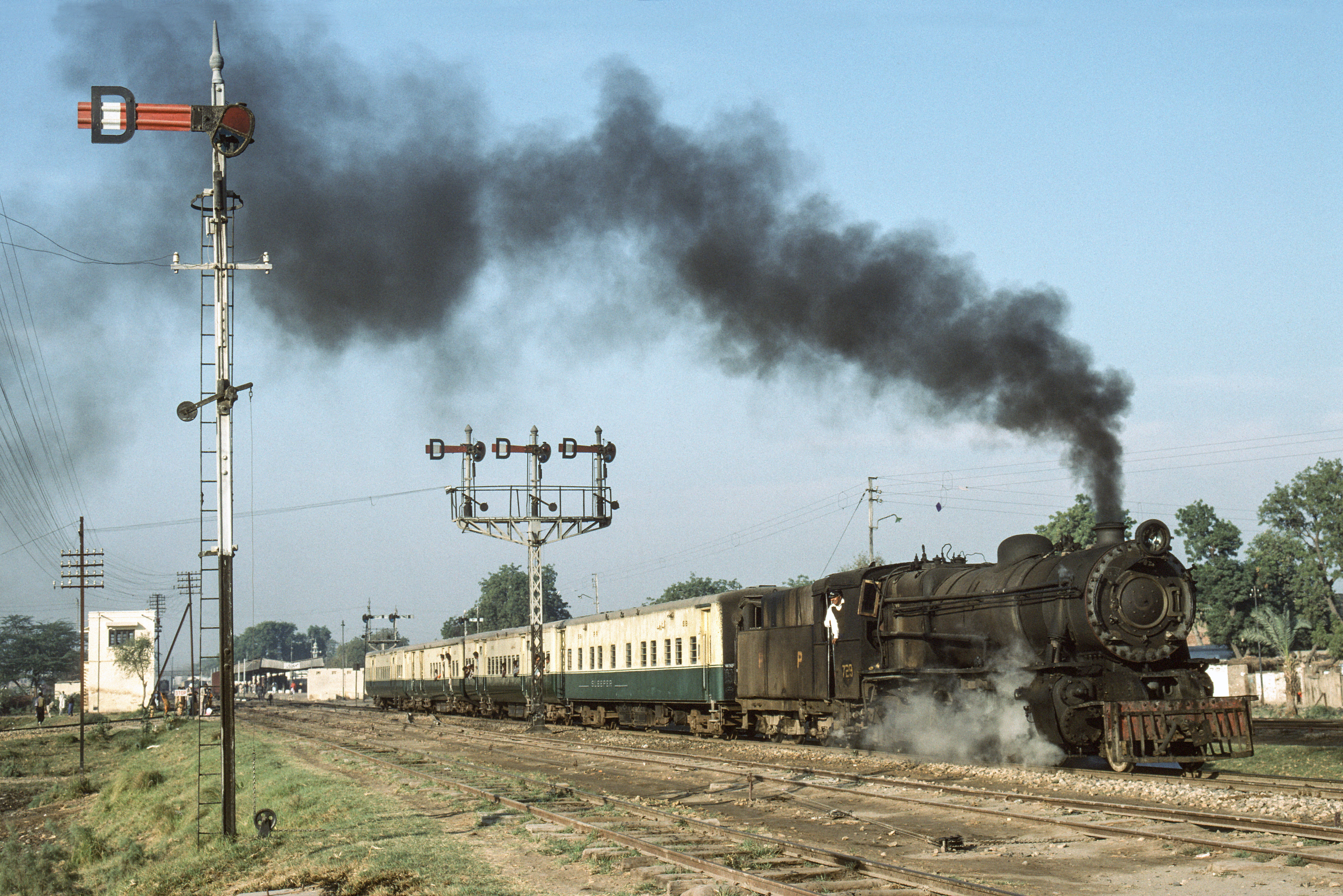
A Japanese-built YD hauling a passenger train, 1993

== Bibliography ==
- Hughes, Hugh (1977). Steam Locomotives in India, Part 2 – Metre Gauge. The Continental Railway Circle. ISBN 0-9503469-3-4.
