= Jetalsar–Rajkot Railway =

Railway in Gujarat, India

Overview
- Headquarters: Rajkot
- Locale: Saurashtra, Gujarat
- Dates of operation: 1893–1948
- Predecessor: Bhavnagar–Gondal–Junagadh–Porbandar Railway, Dhrangadhra Railway, Morvi Railway
- Successor: Saurashtra Railway, Western Railway

Technical
- Track gauge: 1,000 mm (3 ft 3 3/8 in) metre gauge

The Jetalsar–Rajkot Railway was a metre gauge line in Gujarat, India. The line of 46 miles (72 km) connected Jetalsar to Rajkot and opened in 1893. The line was worked by the Bhavnagar–Gondal–Junagadh–Porbandar Railway (BGJPR) until 1911; and later by the Gondal–Porbandar Railway (GPSR).

== History ==
The railway line from Jetalsar to Rajkot was proposed by the government in 1891. The Gondal State had spent most of its reserves on the Porbandar State Railway which reached the port of Porbandar in 1890. Various meetings were called by the Political Agent and an agreement was reached in 1891. Junagadh State had already started the line as far as Navagad. Under the agreement when the line was continued to Gondal it would be handed over at cost to Gondal. The financing states agreed to have the Bhavnagar-Gondal-Junagad-Porbandar Railway as the operating company. The capital was split between Gondal and Junagadh with 3/8 each and Rajkot and a reluctant Jetalsar 1/8 each. Raising a total of Rs 1,600,000, the line opened in 1893.

The operation of the line ran smoothly until the dissolution of the BGJPR. The agreement stated that the Railway Board would decide who the operator of the railway would be. They granted this to Gondal in 1911. In 1913 the Annual report from Rajkot stated that "The large increase in profits on the Jetalsar-Rajkot Railway is due to the J-R being an integral Railway since 1911. The split of the BGJP Railway has contributed to the securing on the hire its legitimate share of traffic".

With the inclusions of the Kathiawar Ports into the "Customs Union of British India", a growth of lines connecting the various ports started. The "Jetalsar-Rajkot Railway" was an important link for north-south traffic and the Railway Board specified the proportion of traffic to and from the various State Ports. Seeing a threat to its income Bhavnagar approached Jetalsar in 1910 about buying its share in the "Jetalsar-Rajkot Railway" this started a bidding war with both Junagadh and Gondal claiming that Jetalsar had sold its share to them. The relationship between Gondal and Junagadh deteriorated with complaints from Junagadh to the Railway Board of mismanagement, which were dismissed by the Railway Board on investigation. As the two States fought for control. Gondal made a number of pleas to obtain Jetalsar’s share with no success as the Bombay, Indian and British Governments tried to maintain a status quo. During this period a price war broke out and this also lead to a disagreement with Porbandar and the separation of the Gondal-Porbandar Railway in 1916.

The relationship between Gondal and Junagadh deteriorated with complaints from Junagadh to the Railway Board of mismanagement, which were dismissed by the Railway Board on investigation. As the two States fought for control. Gondal made a number of pleas to obtain Jetalsar’s share with no success as the Bombay, Indian and British Governments tried to maintain a status quo. In the end all such proposals were turned down by the Railway Board. The line probably continued to operate under Gondal State, feeding both the Junagadh and Porbandar State Railways until Nationalisation in 1952.

== Conversion to broad gauge ==
The railway was converted to 5 ft 6 in (1,676 mm) broad gauge by 2003.
