= CCSR =

CCSR may refer to:

- Canadian Society for the Study of Religion
- Center for Climate Systems Research
- Center for Clinical Sciences Research
- Cherra Companyganj State Railways
