= Hathigadh =

- Village
- Location in Gujarat, India Hathigadh (India)
- Coordinates: 21°34′40″N 71°25′25″E
- Country: India
- State: Gujarat
- District: Amreli
- Talukas: Liliya

Population (2009)
  - Total: 1,641

Languages
  - Official: Gujarati, Hindi
- Time zone: UTC+5:30 (IST)
- PIN: 365535
- Vehicle registration: GJ
- Sex ratio: 0.97 ♂/♀
- Website: www.indiavillageportal.org/Amreli/view_results_detail.asp?ID=191&mVarTable=%5BSheet1%5D

Hathigadh is a village in Liliya tehsil, Amreli district, Gujarat, India. It has a High school and a Primary school. There is no river in the village, but a reservoir is under construction. There is a temple, Ramji Mandir. The village is surrounded by many big and old trees. The main occupation of the people of the village is farming.

Hathigadh has a railway station on the Dhasa–Rajula line.
