= Sanghrajka =

Sanghrajka is a surname which originated in India and belongs to Jain families. The name has its origins primarily in a small village called Jhar in Kathiawar, District Amreli, State Gujarat in India. The Sanghrajka families migrated from Jhar to various towns in Gujarat, including Rajkot, Dhari, and Amreli. They also moved to cities in Maharashtra such as Mumbai, Pune, Nashik, as well as other major cities across India.

It is believed that the surname was bestowed upon the family as an honour for the services provided by the family to the Jain ascetics (Sangh). Sanghrajka, simply means, those who take part in a Sangh i.e. procession.

Sanghrajka worship Naga-devata - named Satrasia Bapa as Kuladevata and Khodiyar Maa as Kuldevi. The ancestral temple of snake-god, Sri Satsaria Bapa is located at Dhasa, Dhasa is a small city and railway junction in Botad District of Gujarat. The Temple of Khodiyar Maa seating on 'magar' (crocodile) her 'vahan' (vehicle) located at Rajpara, Bhavnagar, State Gujarat in India

In the 21st century, Sanghrajka families exist in many parts of India and countries like Kenya, United Kingdom, United States of America and Singapore.

There have been many notable people with the Sanghrajka name throughout history, however, perhaps the most famous is Miren Sanghrajka. He is a British man born in 2005 and his most notable achievement is becoming an IP.
