= Okhamandal State Railway =

Railway in India

- Industry: Railways
- Founded: 1918
- Defunct: 1951
- Headquarters: British India
- Area served: Okhamandal State
- Services: Rail transport

The Okhamandal State Railway was a 37 miles (60 km) metre gauge railway financed by the Okhamandal State.

== History ==
The line between Kuranga and Arthara was sanctioned in 1913. In 1918, work on this line was stopped due to the war. In 1921, the Gaekwar's Baroda State Railway (GBSR) took over the management and operation of the Okhamandal State Railway. In 1922 the Kuranga–Okha Railway branch was opened which linked to the Okha Port Trust Railway. In 1923 the operation and maintenance of the Okhamandal State Railway was passed to the Jamnagar & Dwarka Railway. Saurashtra Railway came into being in April, 1948 with the amalgamation of a number of state railways which included Okhamandal State Railway.

== Conversion to broad gauge ==
The railway was converted to 5 ft 6 in (1,676 mm) broad gauge in 1984.
