= Indian locomotive class YC =

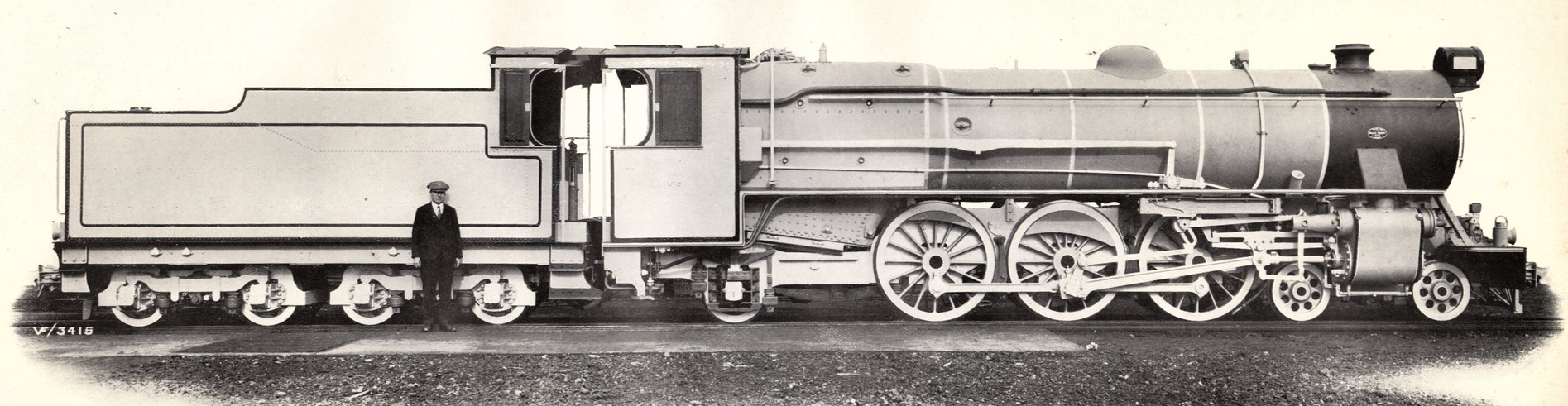
- Vulcan Foundry works photo of a YC class locomotive
Type and origin
- Power type: Steam
- Builder: Nasmyth Wilson and Company; Skoda Works; Vulcan Foundry
- Build date: 1928-1948
- Total produced: 38
Specifications
- Configuration
  - Whyte: 4-6-2
- Gauge: 1,000 mm (3 ft 3 3/8 in)
- Leading dia.: 724 mm (2 ft 4.5 in)
- Coupled dia.: 1,448 mm (4 ft 9.0 in)
- Trailing dia.: 762 mm (2 ft 6.0 in)
- Wheelbase
  - Engine: 8,635 mm (28 ft 4.0 in)
  - Coupled: 3,200 mm (10 ft 6 in)
  - incl. tender: 18,561 mm (60 ft 10.7 in); 18,970 mm (62 ft 3 in) (Note: The locomotives built in 1947-48 had longer tenders, resulting in their overall length and wheelbase being longer compared to the earlier locomotives.)
- Length
  - Over buffers: 18,561 mm (60 ft 10.7 in); 18,970 mm (62 ft 3 in)
- Height: 3,429 mm (11 ft 3.0 in)
- Axle load: 12.2 t (12.0 long tons; 13.4 short tons)
- Loco weight: 56.5 t (55.6 long tons; 62.3 short tons)
- Total weight: 91 t (90 long tons; 100 short tons)
- Fuel type: Coal
- Fuel capacity: 4.5 t (4.4 long tons; 5.0 short tons)
- Water cap.: 13.6 m^{3} (480 cu ft)
- Firebox
  - Grate area: 2.88 m^{2} (31.0 sq ft)
- Boiler
  - Tube plates: 4,724 mm (15 ft 6.0 in)
- Boiler pressure: 12.7 bar (184 psi)
- Heating surface: 134.5 m^{2} (1,448 sq ft)
- Cylinders: Two, outside
- Cylinder size: 445 mm × 610 mm (17.5 in × 24.0 in)
- Valve gear: Walschaerts
Career
- Numbers: See table 30139–30153 (All-India numbers, ex-MSMR)

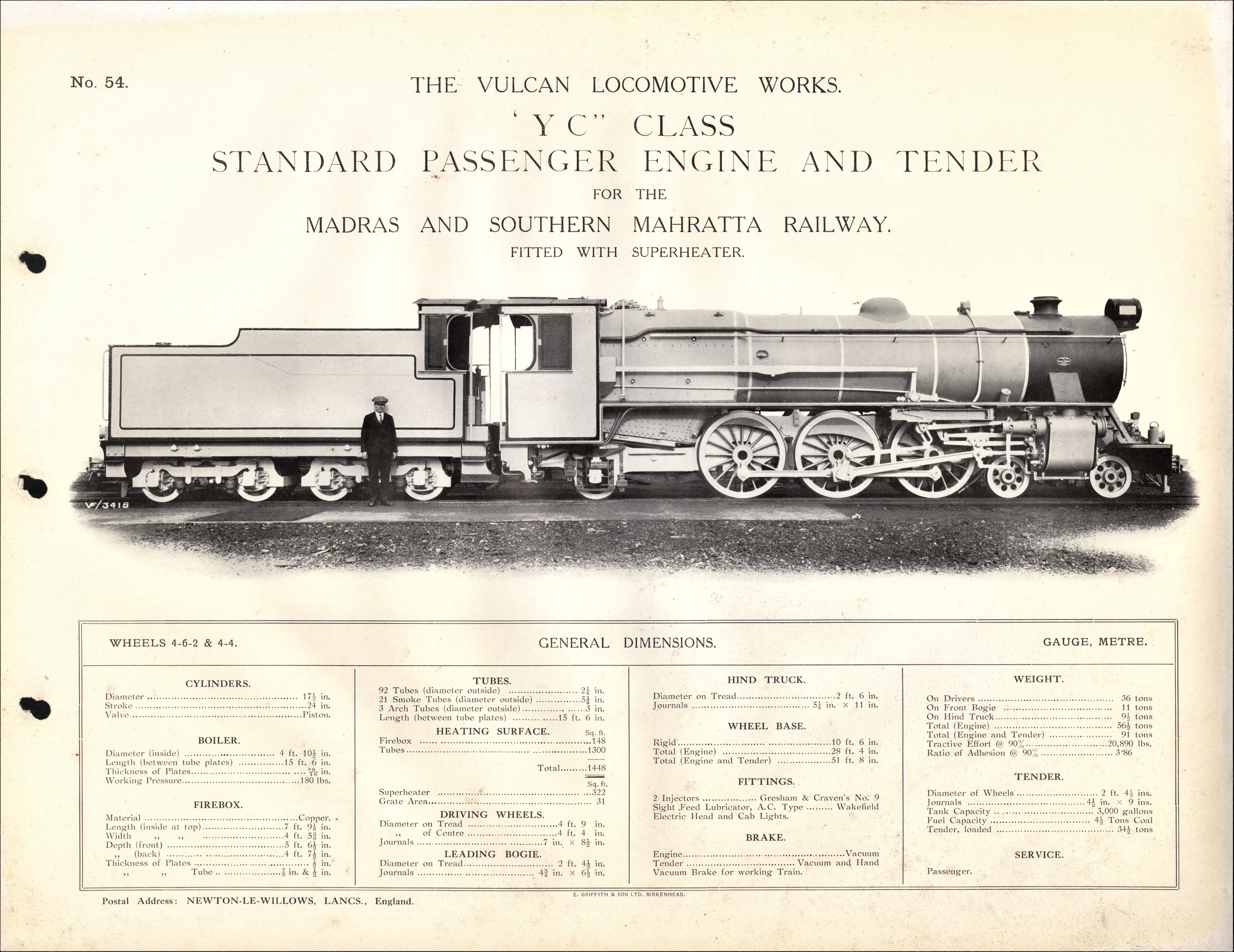
Vulcan Foundry brochure of the YC class

The YC class was a class of 4-6-2 tender locomotives introduced from 1928 for the predecessor metre-gauge railway companies of the Indian Railways (IR) and the Burma Railways (BR), (Note: Later separate from British India.) as part of the metre-gauge Indian Railway Standard (IRS) series of locomotive designs.

== History ==
The YC class was the larger and heavier version of the YB class, fitted with a larger boiler and cylinders, thus increasing the weight by six tons. The axle loading was also increased by two tons, compared to the YB's 10-ton axle load, as a result of the fitting of larger components. Both the YBs and YCs were designed to haul passenger trains.

Between 1928 and 1932, a total of 28 locomotives were built. Only the Bombay, Baroda and Central India Railway, (Note: These BBCIR YCs were later transferred to the MSMR.) the Madras and Southern Mahratta Railway and Burma Railways rostered both the YCs and YBs in their fleets. The other Indian railway companies preferred to use the lighter YB class design, which had well over 200 examples built.

=== Burma ===
After Burma Railways came under control of the government of British Burma recently separated from the British Raj in 1937, its stock including the YC class were taken over. During the Burma campaign and the Japanese occupation, most of the YC class locomotives were destroyed. After the war, Burma Railways acquired 10 more locomotives, of which two are now preserved.

=== India ===
After the partition of India and the amalgamation of private railway companies to form Indian Railways, all 15 locomotives built for the Indian proper were transferred to the Southern Railway zone that was established in 1951. Initially given the numbers 550 to 564, as part of the introduction of a new numbering scheme in March 1957, the YCs were renumbered 30139–30153.

By 1975, none of the YC class were listed on any Indian Railways roster.

== List of operators ==
Builder	Year	Quantity	Serial number	Operator	Running number
Nasmyth, Wilson and Company	1928	3	1520–1522	Madras and Southern Mahratta Railway (MSMR)	414–416 (original) 550–552 (renumbered)
Nasmyth, Wilson and Company	1928	2	1523–1524	Bombay, Baroda and Central India Railway (BBCIR)	328, 347 (original; ex-BBCIR) 563–564 (renumbered; MSMR)
Vulcan Foundry	1929	7	4266–4272	MSMR	553–559
Škoda	1931	10	712–721	Burma Railways (BR)	158–167
Škoda	1931	3	722–724	MSMR	471–473 (original) 560–562 (renumbered)
Vulcan Foundry	1932	3	4558–4560	BR	168–170
Vulcan Foundry	1947/48	10	5598–5607	BR	621–630
