= Vikramatji Khimojiraj =

Maharaja of Porbandar from 1831–1900

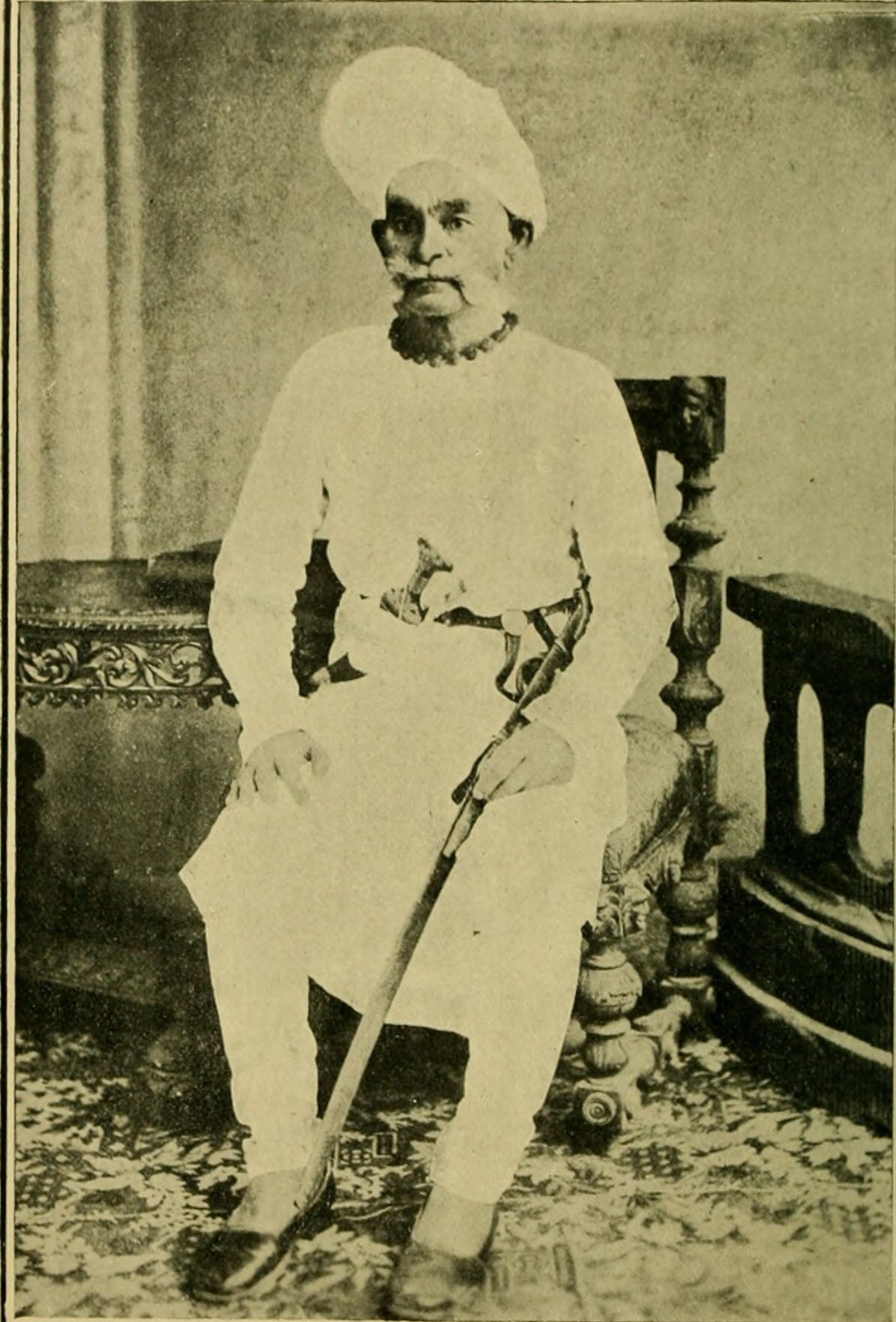
Maharana Vikramatji of Porbandar State (1896)

Maharaja RanaShri Vikramatji Khimojiraj Sahib (1 April 1819 – 21 April 1900) was the ruler of Princely State of Porbandar belonging to Jethwa Rajput dynasty.

He was born at the Darbargadh, Porbandar in 1819 as Bhojirajji and was the only son of Maharaja Rana Shri Khimojiraj Haloji Sahib, Rana Sahib of Porbandar. He succeeded upon the death of his father on 20 June 1831, at the Darbargadh. He reigned under the Regency of his mother until her death in 1841 and was invested with full ruling powers in the same year.

However, under his reign, due to mismanagement of the treasury and general affair of the state, the status of Porbandar was degraded from a first-class to a third-class state in 1869, and the administration taken over by the Bombay government in 1886.

In the year 1888, during his reign the metre gauge railway line Porbandar State Railway was inaugurated.

He died on 21 April 1900, and was succeeded by his grandson Bhavsinhji Madhavsinhji.

== Political office ==
Vikramatji Khimojiraj Jethwa Dynasty Born: 1 April 1819 Died: 21 April 1900
Regnal titles
Preceded by Khimojiraj Haloji	Maharaja of Probandar; 1831-1900	Succeeded by Bhavsinhji Madhavsinhji
