= National Highway 927D (India) =

National highway in India

National Highway 927D
- Map of the National Highway in red

Route information
- Length: 108 km (67 mi)

Major junctions
- East end: Dhoraji
- West end: Jamnagar

Location
- Country: India
- States: Gujarat

Highway system
- Roads in India; Expressways; National; State; Asian
← NH 27	→ NH 27

National Highway 927D, commonly called NH 927D is a national highway in India. It is a spur road of National Highway 27. NH-927D traverses the state of Gujarat in India.

== Route ==
Dhoraji- Jam Kandorna - Kalavad(Shitla) - Jamnagar.

== Junctions ==
Terminal with National Highway 27 near Dhoraji.

== See also ==
- List of national highways in India
