= Rajpipla State Railway =

Indian Railway

- Industry: Railways
- Founded: 1897
- Defunct: 1924
- Headquarters: Rajpipla, British India
- Area served: Rajpipla State
- Services: Rail transport

The Rajpipla State Railway (RSR) was a 2 ft 6 in (762 mm) narrow-gauge railway, built by Rajpipla State.

== History ==
The railway was constructed as a famine relief line to the Rajipipla District under the auspices of Maharana Chhatrasinhji, Raja of Rajpipla, as a short NG 19 mile(30 km) in 1897 connecting Rajpipla to the BB&CIR BG line at Anklesvar on the New Delhi–Mumbai main line. This section, then called Anklesvar–Rajpipla Railway was worked by Bombay, Baroda and Central India Railway (BB&CIR).

The line was extended to Nandod Station in 1899, giving a total line length of 37 miles(59 km) and renamed the "Rajpipla State Railway". A further 2 mile (3 km) short extension to Nandod Town was completed in 1917 on the opening of the "Kanjan River Bridge", which was inaugurated by Lord Willingdon, Governor of Bombay Presidency, in February 1917. Thereby the railway line was extended from the old station to the new station on the edge of Nandod, the capital of Rajpipla. Ownership of the line remained with the Rajpipla State and worked by BB&CIR.

The Jhagadia–Netrang Railway, a 19-mile (30 km) branch line was opened in 1932. It branched from Jhagadia, on the Anklesvar-Rajpipla section of the Rajpipla State Railway to Netrang. This increased the network length to 59 miles (94 km). In 1948, Rajpipla State Railway (RSR) became a part of Saurashtra Railway.

== Conversion to broad gauge ==
The network was converted to 1,676 mm (5 ft 6 in) 5 ft 6 in (1,676 mm) broad gauge in 2013.
