= Kathiawar State Railway =

Overview
- Headquarters: Surendranagar
- Locale: Kathiawar, British India
- Dates of operation: 1898–1948
- Successor: Bhavnagar State Railway

Technical
- Track gauge: 1,000 mm (3 ft 3 3/8 in) metre gauge

Kathiawar State Railway was a metre gauge railway built by the Kathiawar State. The railway opened in December 1880. The railway ran from Wadhwan on the south side of the Bhogavo River (facing Surendranagar) to the docks at Bhavnagar. It was also known as the Surendranagar–Bhavnagar Railway. This railway later merged with Bhavnagar State Railway.

== Personnel ==
The records show the following deployed to the 'Kathiawar State Railway'

- Trevredyn Rashleigh Wynne deployed from the Railway Branch of the Public Works Department, 1879–83, to the Kathiawar State Railway as Assistant Engineer, later promoted to Executive Engineer.
- John Edwin Dallas, Assistant Engineer, also from the railway Branch was P.A. to the Engineer-in-Chief Kathiawar State Railway, from 1881.
- Ernest Ifill Shadbolt, also from the railway Branch was Executive Engineer, Kathiawar State Railway, 1887–91.

== Conversion to broad gauge ==
The railway was converted to 1,676 mm (5 ft 6 in) 5 ft 6 in (1,676 mm) broad gauge by 2003.

== See also ==
- Railways in Kathiawar
