= Saurashtra Railway =

Former Indian railway company

- Industry: Railways
- Founded: 1948
- Defunct: 1951
- Headquarters: Rajkot, British India
- Area served: Saurashtra State
- Services: Rail transport

Saurashtra Railway came into being in April, 1948 with the amalgamation of state railways like Bhavnagar State Railway, Gondal Railway, Porbandar Railway, Jamnagar & Dwarka Railway, Morvi Railway, Dhrangadhra Railway, Okhamandal State Railway, Junagadh State Railway, Baria State Railway, Rajpipla Railway etc.

Upon the independence of India and the merger of various princely states into the Union of India, it became necessary to merge various state railways owned by these princely states into one. As the various states of Saurashtra and Kathiawar were merged to make Saurashtra State, the Government of India, similarly merged the various state railways of Gujarat into a separate entity called Saurashtra Railway.

On 5 November 1951, Saurashtra Railway, Bombay, Baroda and Central India Railway, Rajputana Railway, Jaipur State Railway, and Cutch State Railway were merged and Western Railway came into existence.
