= Dhasa =

Coordinates: 21°48′N 71°31′E

Dhasa is a small city and railway junction in Botad District of Gujarat. Geographycally there are two small towns, which are Dhasagam and Dhasa junction.

It is situated at distance of 75 km from Bhavnagar, 45 km from Amreli and 100 km from Rajkot. Dhasa is an important point on S.H.25 Which connects Bhavnagar to Rajkot. The population is around 10,000. The main industries are Oil Mills and Cotton Ginning Mills. Dhasa Also Connect State Highway with Rajkot Ahmedabad Bhavnagar Botad And Amreli. Dhasa Also Hub for shopping for small villages around dhasa and have good medical and hospitals.

== Temples ==
There is a temple of Ambaji of a Kuldevi of Jain here.

There is Naga temple of Kuladevata here.

== Transport ==
Dhasa junction was one of the first railway junctions to be established in 1880 on Bhavnagar-Gondal State Railway, Metre Gauge line from Dhasa to Dhoraji.

Dhasa have a State transport bus stand and well connected with most of the districts of Gujarat.
