= Dhamtari railway station =

Railway station in Chhattisgarh

Dhamtari

General information
- Location: National Highway 43, Dhamtari, Chhattisgarh; India
- Coordinates: 20.7151°N 81.5509°E
- Elevation: 325 metres (1,066 ft)
- System: Indian Railways station
- Owner: Indian Railways
- Operator: Raipur railway division
- Line: Raipur–Dhamtari branch line
- Platforms: 2
- Tracks: 4
- Connections: Auto stand

Construction
- Structure type: Standard (on-ground station)
- Parking: No
- Cycle facilities: No

Other information
- Status: Functioning
- Station code: DTR
- Fare zone: South East Central Railway

History
- Electrified: Ongoing

Services
Preceding station	Indian Railways	Following station
Sankra towards ?	South East Central Railway zone Raipur–Dhamtari branch line	Terminus
Location
- Location within India Location within Chhattisgarh

Dhamtari Railway Station is a main railway station in Dhamtari district, Chhattisgarh. Its code is DTR. It serves Dhamtari city. The station consists of two platforms. The station lies on the Raipur–Dhamtari branch line of Bilaspur–Nagpur section.

Previously, the station was part Raipur–Dhamtari branch line which was the first narrow-gauge line of Bengal Nagpur Railway and was established in 1900.
