= Rupsha East–Bagerhat Railway =

Railway line in Bangladesh

Khulna–Bagerhat Railway

Overview
- Status: Dismantled
- Owner: Bangladesh Railway
- Locale: Bangladesh
- Termini: Rupsha East railway station; Bagerhat railway station
- Stations: 10

Service
- Type: Railway line in Bangladesh

History
- Work began: 1916
- Opened: 10 June, 1918
- Completed: 1918
- Closed: 1998

Technical
- Track gauge: 1,676 mm (5 ft 6 in) (1969 - 1998)
- Old gauge: 762 mm (2 ft 6 in) (1918 - 1969)
- Electrification: N/A
- Operating speed: 40 km/h (25 mph)

The Rupsha East–Bagerhat Railway was a 2 ft 6 in (762 mm) narrow gauge railway in Bangladesh. It was constructed in 1918, and was closed in the 1998. 20-mile (32 km) long, in 1958 it had five 2-4-0t steam locomotives, 13 coaches, and 8 freight cars.

== History ==
It was one of the most active narrow gauge railway of Bangladesh. The construction of this railway began in 1916 and ended on 1918. From 10 June, 1918 the train began to be operated on this route. Total distance of this route from Rupsha East railway station to Bagerhat railway station was 32 km. This railway was converted into broad gauge in late 1960s. But due to loss, this railway was closed in 1998. In 2012, this railway line was declared dismantled by selling all the properties of this railway line. Now this railway is completely extinct.

== Stations ==
- Rupsha East railway station
- Karnapur railway station
- Samantasena railway station
- Bahirdia railway station
- Mulghar railway station
- Khanjahanpur railway station
- Jatrapur railway station
- Satgumbuz Road railway station
- Bagerhat College railway station
- Bagerhat railway station
