= Gaekwar's Baroda State Railway =

Indian narrow gauge railway line

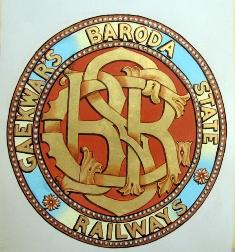
- Industry: Railways
- Successor: Bombay, Baroda and Central India Railway
- Headquarters: India
- Services: Rail transport

Gaekwar's Baroda State Railway (GBSR) or Gaikwad Baroda State Railway was a narrow gauge railway line owned by the Princely State of Baroda, which was ruled by the Gaekwar dynasty.

== History ==
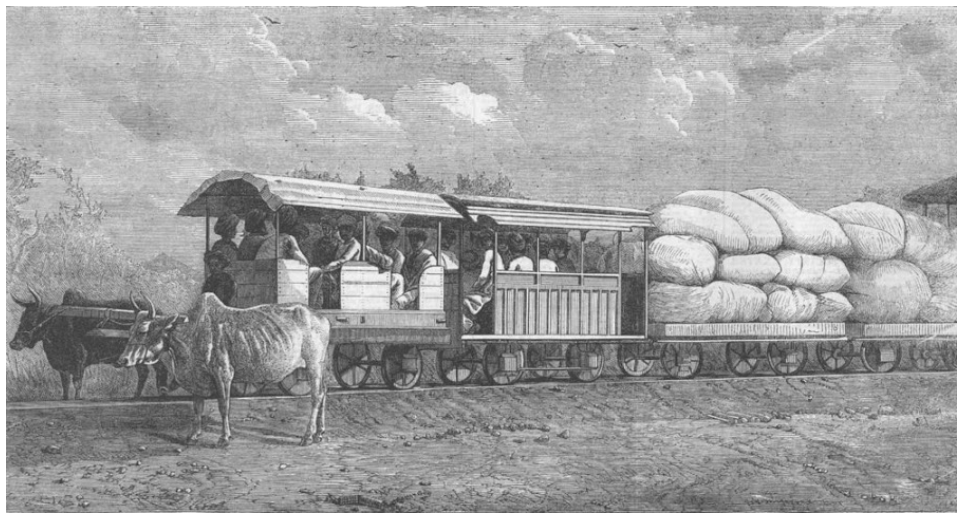
Bullocks hauled train on 2 feet 6 inches wide 3 lbs rail connecting Dabhoi with Miagam

The railway track has the distinction of being the first narrow-gauge line to be laid in British India, and also the first railway to be owned by any Princely State of India. In 1862, Maharaja Khanderao Gaekwad, the Maharaja of Baroda, inaugurated 8 miles (13 km) of a 2 ft 6 in (762 mm) railway line from Dabhoi to Miyagam. Oxen were used to haul the train, although in 1863, Nielson & Co. built a locomotive to be operated on the line from Dabhoi to Miyagram, as the 6.5 km/m rails were not suited for the regular use of an engine.

Later, during the rule of Maharaja Sayajirao Gaekwad III, the railway's network was further expanded. In 1873, the Dabhoi-Miyagam line (the first 2 ft 6 in (762 mm) line) was re-laid with stronger rails to allow locomotives to be used, rather than oxen. However, locomotives were not regularly used on the line until 1880. During the Maharaja's reign, railway network extended to Goyagate, Chandod, Bodeli and Samalaya Jn with Dabhoi as its focal point.

In 1949, the GBSR was merged with the Bombay, Baroda and Central India Railway which was subsequently merged in 1951 with other adjacent zones to form Western Railway.

The narrow-gauge line is currently under conversion to broad gauge.

=== Mehsana railway ===
Rajputana State Railway extended the metre-gauge Delhi–Ajmer line to Ahmedabad in 1881. In 1880, the Government of Bombay addressed His Highness’ Government of Baroda State for the construction of feeder lines in Kadi after the completion of Dabhoi Railway. In Kadi, a network of railway line was spread out.

The Government of Bombay and the government of Baroda State opened the Mehsana–Viramgam metre gauge line in 1891. The Mehsana–Taranga Hill metre-gauge line was opened for traffic from 1887 to 1909.

The Mehsana-Patan metre gauge line was opened in 1891 and was extended to Wagrod and Kakoshi in 1915 and 1916 respectively. The Manund Road-Harij branch metre gauge line as well as Chanasma-Bechraji metre gauge line were opened in 1908.

== Rolling stock ==
In 1936, the company owned 66 locomotives, 3 railcars, 483 coaches and 1674 goods wagons.

== Classification ==
It was labeled as a Class II railway according to Indian Railway Classification System of 1926.

== See also ==
- List of railway companies in India
