= Gondal State Railway =

Defunct railway in Gujarat, India

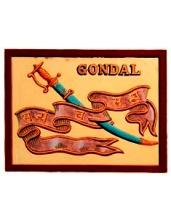
- Industry: Railways
- Founded: 1911
- Defunct: 1948
- Headquarters: Gondal, British India
- Area served: Gondal State
- Services: Rail transport

The Gondal State Railway (GSR) was a metre gauge railway owned by the Gondal State.

== History ==
The line opened in 1881 and originally worked by the Bhavnagar–Gondal–Junagad–Porbandar Railway. From 1911, the line formed the nucleus of a new system, working jointly with the Porbandar State Railway (PSR) thus forming the Gondal–Porbandar Railway. In 1919, GSR took over the sole working of the PSR. Khijadiya–Dhari Railway opened in 1913 was a metre gauge railway, part of GSR and owned by the State of Gondal. In 1948, GSR became a part of Saurashtra Railway.

== Personnel ==
No staff lists have ever been found. The following personnel are recorded as 'on loan' from the Public Works Department (PWD).

- Richard Gardiner Lieut-Col. R.E. from PWD, 1887, Manager and Engineer-in-Chief of 'Bhavnagar-Gondal Railway' until retirement in 1893.
- Willoughby Verner Constable, 1887, Officiating Manager of 'Bhavnagar and Gondal States Railways'.
- Ernest Ifill Shadbolt, PWD Assistant Engineer from 1874 to 1884 'services lent to Bhavnagar and Gondal States' Railways.
- Horace Chaloner Knox, 1890, Executive Engineer employed with 'Bhavnagar-Gondal-Junagad-Porbandar Railway'.

== Rolling stock ==
In 1936, the company owned 23 locomotives, 114 coaches and 510 goods wagons.

== Classification ==
It was labeled as a Class II railway according to Indian Railway Classification System of 1926.

== Conversion to broad gauge ==
The network was converted to 1,676 mm (5 ft 6 in) 5 ft 6 in (1,676 mm) broad gauge progressively in 2010s.

== See also ==
- Railways in Kathiawar
