= Bhavnagar State Railway =

Former meter gauge railway line in India

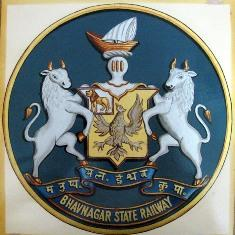
- Industry: Railways
- Founded: 1880
- Defunct: 1948
- Area served: Bhavnagar State

Bhavnagar State Railway (BSR) was a metre gauge railway line in Bhavnagar State, now part of Gujarat in India.

== History ==
In November 1878, on the instance of Maharaja Takthasinhji of Bhavnagar State, the Governor of Bombay Sir Richard Temple sanctioned the extension of a meter gauge railway line from Wadhwan to Bhavnagar, which was opened on 18 December 1880. Maharaja Takhtasinhji accorded sanction for construction of a railway from Bhavnagar to Wadhwan in the north and Dhoraji in the west with the line from Dhasa to Dhoraji funded by Gondal State. During 1863, Maharaja Jaswantsinhji received a proposal to start a Narrow Gauge line like in parts of Gaekwad Railway in Baroda. Maharaja was not inclined, as by that time another company called Ghogha Kathiawad Light Railway Company had been formed and it could be easily joined at Vartej, a mere 10 km away. But nothing materialized.

The Bhavnagar-Gondal Railway was a joint venture with funds from both states 1839. Bhavnagar contributed Rs. 86 lakhs and Rs.29 lakhs was Gondal's contribution. The Bhavnagar-Wadhwan line had a length of a 166 km; the Dhola-Dhasa-Dhoraji line had a length of 144 km. The work was carried out between 1878 and 1880. In March 1879, Mr. Alexander Izat was appointed as the Engineer-in-Chief. He was earlier the Chief Engineer of Daund-Manmad line (which had opened in 1878). Mr. R. Proctor Sims who was Bhavnagar's state Engineer had carried out the survey from Bhavnagar to Botad. The survey from Dhasa to Dhoraji was carried out under Mr. Ford who held analogous post in Gondal. An engineer from BB & CI, Mr. Hargreaves did the survey from Botad to Wadhwan. The earth-work was commenced as a famine work with all possible haste and finished within an astonishingly short time by May 1880. His Highness requested the Governor of Bombay Sir James Ferguson (who had succeeded Sir Richard Temple in March 1879) to inaugurate the line in December and declare it open for traffic.

On 17 December 1880 the Governor and his entourage arrived at Bhavnagar by a special steamer from Bombay named May Frere. Many guests, both European and native, were invited. On approach of the May Frere at port of Bhavnagar, Colonel Barton (the political Agent), Major Woodhouse (the Assistant Political Agent) and Diwan Sahib Samaldas went in a steam launch and brought the Governor and his party ashore. Takhtsinhji received the Governor at the landing steps and welcomed him. The Governor was then taken to the town and the evening spent in sight seeing and visiting the Gaurishankar Lake. Early next morning on 18 December 1880, the governor drove the last spike of the permanent way at the city station (now Bhavnagar Terminus) in the presence of a large gathering and declared the railway line from Bhavnagar to Wadhwan open, then went to a welcome at Limdi station.

The Bhavnagar State Railway along with other state railways of Kathiawar and Saurashtra were merged in April 1948 into Saurashtra Railway by the Government of India. Saurashtra Railway was merged with BB&CI to form Western Railways.

== Rolling stock ==
In 1936, the company owned 35 locomotives, 1 railcar, 187 coaches and 1059 goods wagons.

== Classification ==
It was labeled as a Class II railway according to Indian Railway Classification System of 1926.

== Conversion to broad gauge ==
The BSR was converted to 1,676 mm (5 ft 6 in) broad gauge in 2003.

== See also ==
- Railways in Kathiawar
