= Bengal Provincial Railway =

Railroad in West Bengal, India

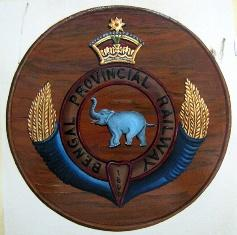

Overview
- Status: Defunct
- Locale: West Bengal, India
- Termini: Tarakeswar; Magra (later Tribeni)

Service
- Type: Narrow-gauge railway

History
- Opened: 1895
- Closed: 1956

Technical
- Line length: 34 mi (55 km)
- Track gauge: 2 ft 6 in (762 mm)

Bengal Provincial Railway was a 2 ft 6 in (762 mm) narrow-gauge railway from Tarakeswar to Magra, in the Indian state of West Bengal.

== History ==
The Bengal Provincial Railway was opened by Bengali engineer Annadaprasad Roy in 1895 from Tarakeswar on the East Indian Railway to Magra, which was on the East Indian Railway broad gauge. Built by local interests, the line was 32 miles (51 km) long, until extended a further 2 miles (3.2 km) to Tribeni in 1904. The railway mostly used small 2-4-0T locomotives. There also was a branch line from Dashghora to Jamalpur.

== Rolling stock ==
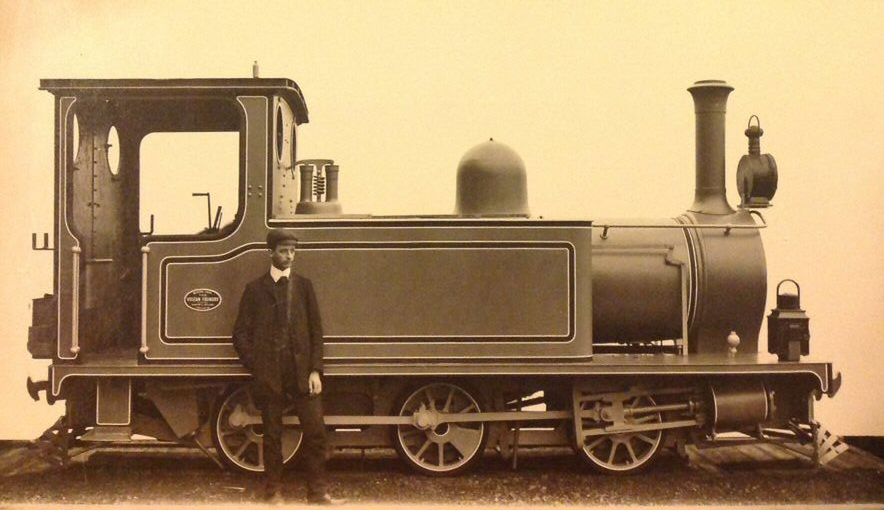
2-4-0T locomotive No 5 of Bengal Provincial Railway, 1905

In 1936, the company owned three locomotives, 31 coaches and 69 goods wagons.

== Classification ==
It was labelled as a Class III railway according to the Indian Railway Classification System of 1926.

== Closure ==
Increasing losses following World War II led to its closure in 1956.
