= Dhrangadhra Railway =

Overview
- Headquarters: Dhrangadhra
- Locale: Gujarat
- Dates of operation: 1898–1948
- Successor: Saurashtra Railway, Western Railway

Technical
- Track gauge: 1,000 mm (3 ft 3 3/8 in) metre gauge

Dhrangadhra Railway was a 1,000 mm (3 ft 3 3/8 in) metre gauge in the Dhrangadhra state in Gujarat during the 19th century.

== History ==
Dhrangadhra Railway was owned by Ghanshyamsinhji of Dhrangadhra state, who ruled from 1889 to 1942. It was opened to traffic in 1898. A small metre gauge section between Dhrangadhra and Wadhwan was opened in 1905. Initially it worked with Bhavnagar–Gondal–Junagad–Porbandar Railway until 1911. Later it worked with Bhavnagar State Railway until 1942. During this time the total rail line was 40 miles.

== Conversion to broad gauge ==
The railway lines were converted to 1,676 mm (5 ft 6 in) broad gauge in 1984.
