= Parlakimedi Light Railway =

paralakhemundi Light Railway
- Industry: Railways
- Founded: 1900
- Headquarters: Paralakhemundi, India
- Area served: Eastern India

Parlakhemundi Light Railway (PLR) was the first narrow gauge railway line between Naupada to Paralakhemundi end extended to Gunupur in states of Odisha and Andhra Pradesh. Established by Maharajah of Paralakhemundi in 1899. The line was initially owned by Gajapati Maharaja of Paralakhemundi Estate. This is the first narrow gauge section railway station of Odisha.Founded by Rajah Saheb GCIE Gourachandra Gajapati Narayan Dev ,father of Maharajah Sri Krushna Chandra Gajapati Narayan Deo.

== History ==
Paralakhemundi formerly known as Parlakimedi Light Railway was established by Maharaja Goura Chandra Gajapati Narayan Dev KCIE of Paralakhemundi, the erstwhile Maharajah of Paralakhemundi. The Raja of Paralakhemundi decided to connect his capital with Naupada, which was only 40 km (25 mi) away. With the then British Government giving sanction in 1898, work began in full earnest. The line was opened to traffic in 1900. This railway line was built at a cost of Rs 7 lakh. The operations of the PLR was taken over by the Bengal-Nagpur Railway (BNR) in 1902. In the first few years, the PLR had incurred losses but after 1910, it started making marginal profits and after 1924–1925, the profits increased. This motivated the Raja's Son the Great Maharaja Krushna Chandra Gajapati Narayan Dev to extend the line to Gunupur in two phases in 1929 and 1931. The standard type of locomotive on PLR was the 20 ton 0-6-4T locomotive with small (27 inch diameter) coupled wheels and an axle load of only 4.75 tons. During the SER centenary celebrations in 1987, set of four postage stamps were released. One of the stamps featured the PL 691 locomotive.

== Conversion to broad gauge ==
The line was finally closed for gauge conversion on 9 June 2004. After conversion to broad gauge the Gunpur-Paralakhemundi-Naupada rail line was opened to public and from 21 August 2011.
