= Jaipur State Railway =

Former metre gauge railway

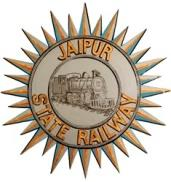
- Industry: Railways
- Headquarters: Jaipur, British India
- Area served: Jaipur State
- Services: Rail transport

The Jaipur State Railway was a 1,000 mm (3 ft 3 3/8 in) metre gauge railway constructed by the Jaipur Durbar and owned by the Princely Jaipur State. The railway was managed, stocked and worked by the Jaipur Durbar and trafficked by the Bombay, Baroda and Central India Railway (BB&CIR) for a specified fee.

== History ==
The mainline, Jaipur–Sawai Madhopur Railway from Sanganer (in the south west suburbs of Jaipur) to Nawai, 32 miles, opened in 1905 and was extended to Sawai Madhopur (to the south-east of Jaipur) in 1907 making total line length of 73 miles

The Jaipur–Shekhawati Railway was named on the ceremonial opening of the Jaipur West railway station, 9 November 1916 by the then Viceroy, Lord Chelmsford when the line was further extended to Reengus (to the north-west from Jaipur), making line length of 108 miles (173 km).

Further extensions from Reengus to Sikar and on to Jhunjhunu, a further 71 miles to the north-north-west were authorised/under construction in 1918. The date of opening of this section has not been determined.

The railway was worked by Bombay, Baroda and Central India Railway (BB&CIR) until 1936 when the Jaipur Durbar took the Jaipur State Railway back under its own management. It was again absorbed in BB&CIR and subsequently became a part of the North Western Railway zone of Indian Railways.

== Conversion to broad gauge ==
The railway was converted to 5 ft 6 in (1,676 mm) broad gauge progressively from 1993 till 2009.
