= Dhoraji =

- Town
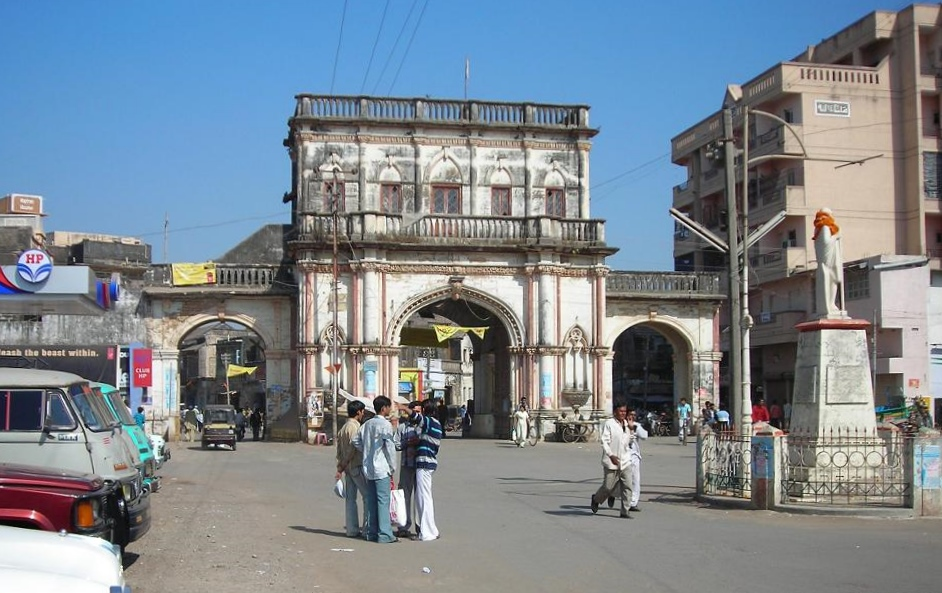
- Three Gates (Tran Darwaja), Dhoraji

- Location in Gujarat, India
- Coordinates: 21.73367°N 70.449915°E
- Country: India
- State: Gujarat
- District: Rajkot
- Elevation: 73 m (240 ft)

Population (2014)
  - Total: 84,545

Languages
  - Official: Gujarati, Hindi
- Time zone: UTC+5:30 (IST)
- PIN: 360410
- Telephone code: +912824
- Vehicle registration: GJ 03

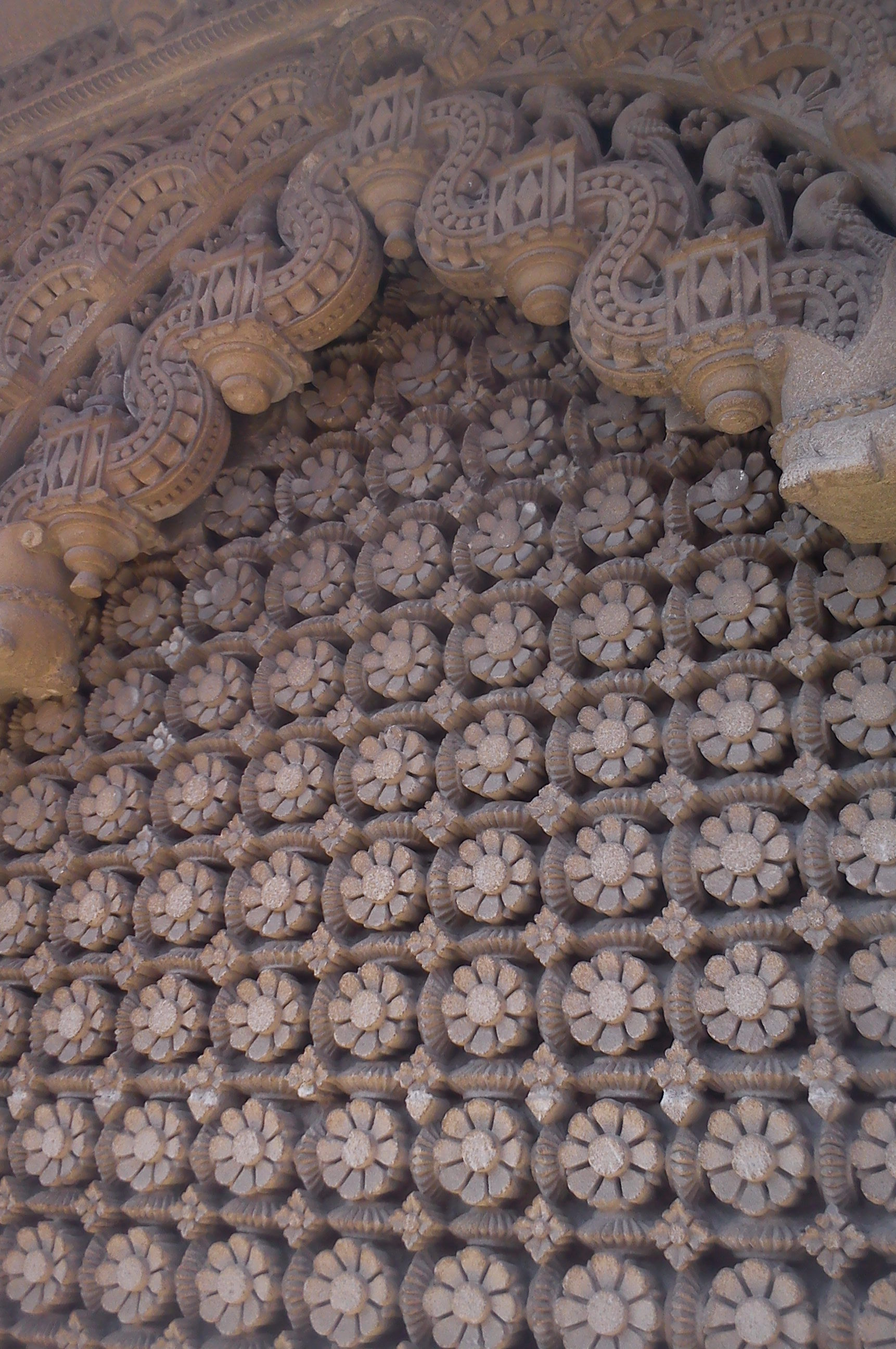
A very famous monument of Dhoraji. An ancient carving from around 200 years old and a prime identity of Dhoraji and Gondal state.

Dhoraji is a town situated on the banks of the River Safura, a tributary of the River Bhadar. It is a municipality in the Rajkot district in the state of Gujarat, India.

== History ==
Dhoraji was acquired by Kumbhaji II of Gondal State from Junagadh State about the middle of the eighteenth century. Bhagwatsinhji, the noble ruler of Gondal State, was born at Dhoraji Darbargadh. In the late 19th century, he introduced town planning principles to regularize and monitor the growth of the town and established a town planning department.

The new neighbourhoods between the railway station and the old town are an example of urban planning during the British India. After the arrival of railway in the town, the new town was designed with axial planning, road circles, parks, public amenities, markets and broad avenues.

Galaxy Chowk, Dhoraji.

== Attractions ==
Dhoraji Fort was completed in 1755 AD. The massive fort wall has several bastions, 4 main gates and 3 smaller gates, known as baris. The four main gates are Kathiawadi Darwaja in the East, Porbandar Gate in the West, Halar Gate in the North and Junagadh Gate in the South.

Next to the temples of Shri Panchnath Mahadev, Rushiwadi Bileshwar Mahadev and Shri Chetaniya Hanuman, the Shree Swaminarayan Mandir is also a popular spiritual centre in the old town. Murli Manohar Temple is older than 350 years, bearing various architectural styles like Gujarati ornamental, Rajasthani and Indo-mughal styles.

== Demographics ==
As of 2001 India census, Dhoraji had a population of 80,807. Males constitute 51% of the population and females 49%. Dhoraji has an average literacy rate of 71%, higher than the national average of 59.5%: male literacy is 78% and, female literacy is 65%. In Dhoraji, 11% of the population is under 6 years of age.

== Environmental Issues ==
Major pollution is caused by Jetpur cotton industries.

== Economy ==
The area's economy was long centered around sugar and tile production. Today, it relies on agriculture, specifically cotton, groundnuts, peanut, sugar cane, corn, vegetables, as well as edible oil production. However, Dhoraji is also developing into a hub for the plastics industry.

Dhoraji also famous for its own food items (like garlic potatoes, bread pakoda, and besan gathiya, king ice gola, pau bhaji)

== Transport ==
=== Air ===
Rajkot and Porbandar are the nearest airports. Keshod and Jamnagar are also nearby airports.

=== Road ===
Dhoraji is on National Highway 27. NH27 connects Dhoraji with Upleta, Rajkot, Porbandar, Gondal and Jetpur. National Highway 927D connects Dhoraji to Jamnagar via Kalavad.

=== Railway ===
Dhoraji railway station lies on the Wansjaliya-Jetalsar railway line that connects with Rajkot, the nearest large city. Wansjaliya railway junction is west of Dhoraji and connects with Porbandar, Jamnagar. Dhoraji railway station and Jetalsar railway junction are east of Dhoraji and connect with Rajkot.
