= Junagadh State Railway =

- Junagadh & Veraval Railway
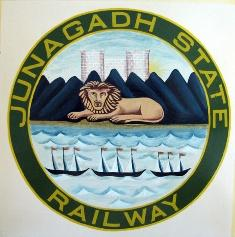

Overview
- Headquarters: Junagadh
- Locale: Saurashtra, Gujarat
- Dates of operation: 1911–1948
- Predecessor: Bhavnagar–Gondal–Junagadh–Porbandar Railway
- Successor: Saurashtra Railway, Western Railway

Technical
- Track gauge: 1,000 mm (3 ft 3 3/8 in) metre gauge

The Junagadh State Railway, also called Junagadh & Veraval Railway, was a metre gauge railway owned by the Junagadh State and initially worked by the Bhavnagar–Gondal–Junagadh–Porbandar Railway. From 1911 the JunSR worked itself as an independent system, owned by the Junagadh Durbar, until 1948 when it became part of the Saurashtra Railway.

== Rolling stock ==
In 1936, the company owned 18 locomotives, 2 railcars, 99 coaches and 373 goods wagons.

== Classification ==
It was labeled as a Class II railway according to Indian Railway Classification System of 1926.

== Conversion to broad gauge ==
The railway was converted to 1,676 mm (5 ft 6 in) 5 ft 6 in (1,676 mm) broad gauge progressively in 2000s.
