= Rajputana–Malwa Railway =

Railway station in Rajasthan, India

Rajputana–Malwa Railway, originally known as Rajputana State Railway until 1882, originally built as a 1,000 mm (3 ft 3 3/8 in) (metre gauge) railway line from Delhi to Ajmer and later extended to Indore and Ahmedabad. From 1994-2017, it was converted to 1,676 mm (5 ft 6 in) broad gauge.

== History ==
=== 1869: Inception ===
The network was formed in 1869 and executed under the direct oversight of the British Public Works Department (PWD). Rajputana State Railway (RSR) holds a historic milestone as the first imperial railway line funded, owned, and constructed directly by the Government of India (under British state auspices) to completely secure the trade and transport of salt from the Sambhar Salt Lake to the North-West Provinces, bypassing regional taxes and tariffs. Unlike older Indian railways (like the East Indian Railway) that were funded by private British companies under a government-guaranteed profit scheme, the RSR was a fully state-run project. It was opened on 18 August 1876. The railway was renamed as Rajputana–Malwa Railway when a new line from Ajmer to Khandwa via Ujjain Junction, Indore Junction, Rajendra Nagar, Mhow and Barwaha were added to it.

In late 1874, the construction approach was split into two completely different districts before they merged in late 1874, Delhi District (Delhi to Bandikui line) built entirely via departmental management under which government engineers hired and supervised local laborers directly spearheaded by PWD engineers Willoughby Charles Furnivall and Major Frederick Smith Stanton, and Agra District (Agra via Jaipur to Ajmer line) built by awarding the contract to a private construction firm "Messrs Glover & Company" working under the engineering supervision of PWD's Major Frederick Weston Peile.

=== 1884 onwards: Expansion ===
In 1884, the system expanded and was renamed the Rajputana-Malwa State Railway. On 9 March 1885, Jodhpur was connected to this network from Marwar Junction with meter gauge track and later became part of the Jodhpur-Bikaner Railway. F-734, the first locomotive built in India, was built by the Ajmer workshop of the Rajputana Malwa Railway in 1895. This locomotive with outside connecting and side rods was used on Rajputana Malwa as well as Bombay, Baroda and Central India Railway systems. The management of Rajputana–Malwa Railway was taken over by the Bombay, Baroda and Central India Railway (B.B.C.I.) in 1889, and it was absorbed into BBCI in 1900.

In 1889, the government transferred operational management to a private operator, "Bombay, Baroda, and Central India Railway" (BB&CI), which fully absorbed it by 1900.

=== 1994-2017: Gauge conversion ===
From 1994 to 2017, the railway line was progressively converted to 1,676 mm (5 ft 6 in) broad gauge.

== Present status ==
Presently Delhi-Rewari-Jaipur-Ajmer-Indore-Ahamdabad network falls primarily under the North Western Railway (NWR) and the Western Railway (WR) zones of Indian Railways. NWR Zone, headquartered in Jaipur, manages former Rajputana–Malwa lines that now constitute the Ajmer and Jaipur divisions. WR Zone, headquartered in Mumbai, absorbed other historical parts of the Rajputana–Malwa lines, which are predominantly managed today under the Ratlam and Ahmedabad divisions of WR.

== See also ==
- History of railway in India
- Future of rail transport in India
- History of rail transport
- Timeline of railway history
