= Cherra Companyganj State Railways =

Railway in British India

Overview
- Status: Closed
- Termini: Tharia Railway Station; Companyganj Railway Station

Service
- Type: Light rail, Mountain railway

History
- Opened: June 6, 1886
- Closed: October 15, 1900

Technical
- Track length: 7.5 mi (12.1 km)
- Track gauge: 762 mm (2 ft 6 in)
- Electrification: N/A
- Highest elevation: 60 m (200 ft)

Cherra Companyganj State Railways (CCSR) was a narrow gauge mountain railway that existed in British India.

== History ==
The Cherra Companyganj State Railway was conceptualized by Hubert Kench, the British Executive Engineer of Khasi and Jaintia Hills Division, as there was need to connect Shillong, capital of province to Calcutta, then the capital of British India by rail. The CCSR in Meghalaya was opened to traffic on 6 June 1886. CCSR was a 2 ft 6 in (762 mm) narrow gauge tramway and the railway operated between Tharia, a mining town in Meghalaya and Companyganj, now in Sylhet District of Bangladesh, for a distance of 7.5 miles (12.1 km). Seven gradients were worked by rope mechanisms. It was built at a cost of only eight lakhs rupees, which was incurred by erstwhile Provincial Government of Assam. An extension of railway link up to Sylhet and Goalundo was in plan from where railway link to Calcutta already existed but plans never materialised.

== Closure ==
The railway continued to run between Tharia and Companyganj until the Assam earthquake of 1897 in which the tracks were completely destroyed. The tracks were not repaired after that and the railway finally closed in 15 October, 1900.
