= Morvi Railway =

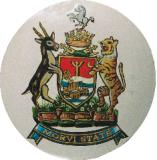

Overview
- Headquarters: Morvi
- Locale: Gujarat
- Dates of operation: 1890–1948
- Successor: Saurashtra Railway, Western Railway

Technical
- Track gauge: 1,000 mm (3 ft 3 3/8 in)
- Previous gauge: 762 mm (2 ft 6 in)

Morvi Railway (MR) was a 1,000 mm (3 ft 3 3/8 in) metre gauge line in the princely state of Morvi in Gujarat, India.

== History ==
The Morvi Railway was built by the Morvi State. Construction started in 1886 and the line was opened to traffic in 1890 between Wadhwan and Wankaner as a 762 mm (2 ft 6 in) narrow gauge roadside tramway. The line was converted to 1,000 mm (3 ft 3 3/8 in) metre gauge in 1905 to match the gauge of other state Railways. During 1905 the metre gauge lines were extended to 73 miles and the 762 mm lines were now 17 miles. The gauge conversion to metre gauge from Wankaner to Morvi was completed in 1924 under the regime of Lakhdiraji Thakor.

In April 1948 it was merged into Saurashtra Railway.

== Rolling stock ==
In 1936, the company owned 59 locomotives, 3 railcars, 134 coaches and 315 goods wagons.

== Classification ==
It was labeled as a Class II railway according to Indian Railway Classification System of 1926.

== Conversion to broad gauge ==
The railway was converted to Broad gauge in the year 2001.
