= Jamnagar & Dwarka Railway =

Defunct railway in Gujarat, India

Jamnagar & Dwaraka Railway
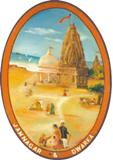

Overview
- Headquarters: Jamnagar, Dwaraka
- Locale: Saurashtra, Gujarat
- Dates of operation: 1897–1948
- Successor: Saurashtra Railway, Western Railway

Technical
- Track gauge: 1,000 mm (3 ft 3 3/8 in) metre gauge

Jamnagar & Dwaraka Railway was a 1,000 mm (3 ft 3 3/8 in) metre gauge in the Nawanagar State in Gujarat during 19th century.

== History ==
After the death of Vibhoji Ranmalji in 1895 Jashwantsinhji Vibhoji who came on to throne on 28 April 1895 started the first section of what came to be called the Jamnagar Railway. The railway line from Jamnagar (then called Nawanagar) to Rajkot was opened for traffic in 1897 with Bhavnagar-Gondal-Junagad-Porbandar railway line. Until 1905 the railway line length was 87 km (54 mi). Ranjitsinhji Vibhoji who was the ruler of Nawanagar State worked with Bhavnagar-Gondal-Junagad-Porbandar Railway system until 1911. Later he worked with Dwarka Railway. As the line was extended westwards towards Dwarka and Okha Port on the Gulf of Kutch. Hence the system was renamed as Jamnagar & Dwarka Railway. During 1942 the railway lines increased to 325 km (202 mi). Later during the regime of Digvijaysinhji Ranjitsinhji, the Jamnagar & Dwaraka Railway was merged into Saurashtra Railway in April 1948.

== Rolling stock ==
In 1936, the company owned 17 locomotives, 3 railcars, 75 coaches and 607 goods wagons.

== Classification ==
It was labeled as a Class II railway according to Indian Railway Classification System of 1926.

== Conversion to broad gauge ==
The railway lines were converted to 1,676 mm (5 ft 6 in) broad gauge in 1984.
