= Porbandar State Railway =

Overview
- Headquarters: Porbandar
- Locale: Gujarat
- Dates of operation: 1888–1948
- Successor: Saurashtra Railway

Porbandar State Railway was a 1,000 mm (3 ft 3 3/8 in) metre gauge in the Porbandar State in Gujarat during the 19th century.

== History ==
The Porbandar State Railway was owned by the State of Porbandar, which was then ruled by Vikramatji Khimojiraj. Later railways were further developed by Bhavsinhji Madhavsinhji and Natwarsinhji Bhavsinhji under their rules. It worked initially with Bhavnagar–Gondal–Junagad–Porbandar Railway until 1911. It was opened to traffic in 1888. Later, from 1919, it worked with Gondal Railway. The Porbandar rail line was extended to Jamjodhpur in 1922, at which time the line was 42 miles long. After that it merged with Saurashtra Railway in April 1948.

== Classification ==
It was labeled as a Class III railway according to Indian Railway Classification System of 1926.

== Conversion to broad gauge ==
The railway lines were converted to 1,676 mm (5 ft 6 in) broad gauge in 2011.
