= Bombay, Baroda and Central India Railway =

Indian railway company

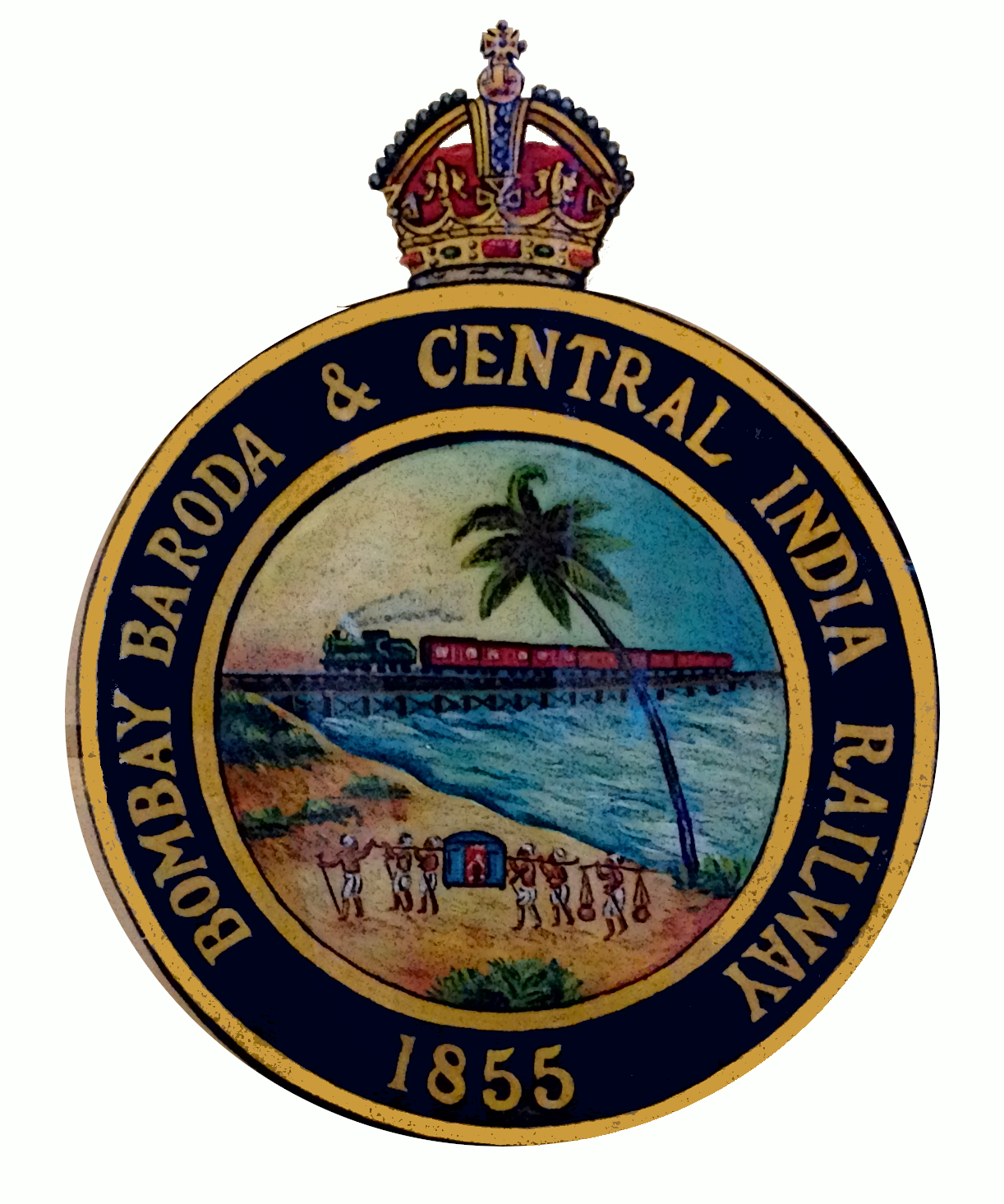
- Industry: Railways
- Founded: 1855; 171 years ago
- Defunct: 1951; 75 years ago
- Headquarters: Bombay, British India
- Area served: Bombay Presidency and Rajputana Agency
- Services: Rail transport

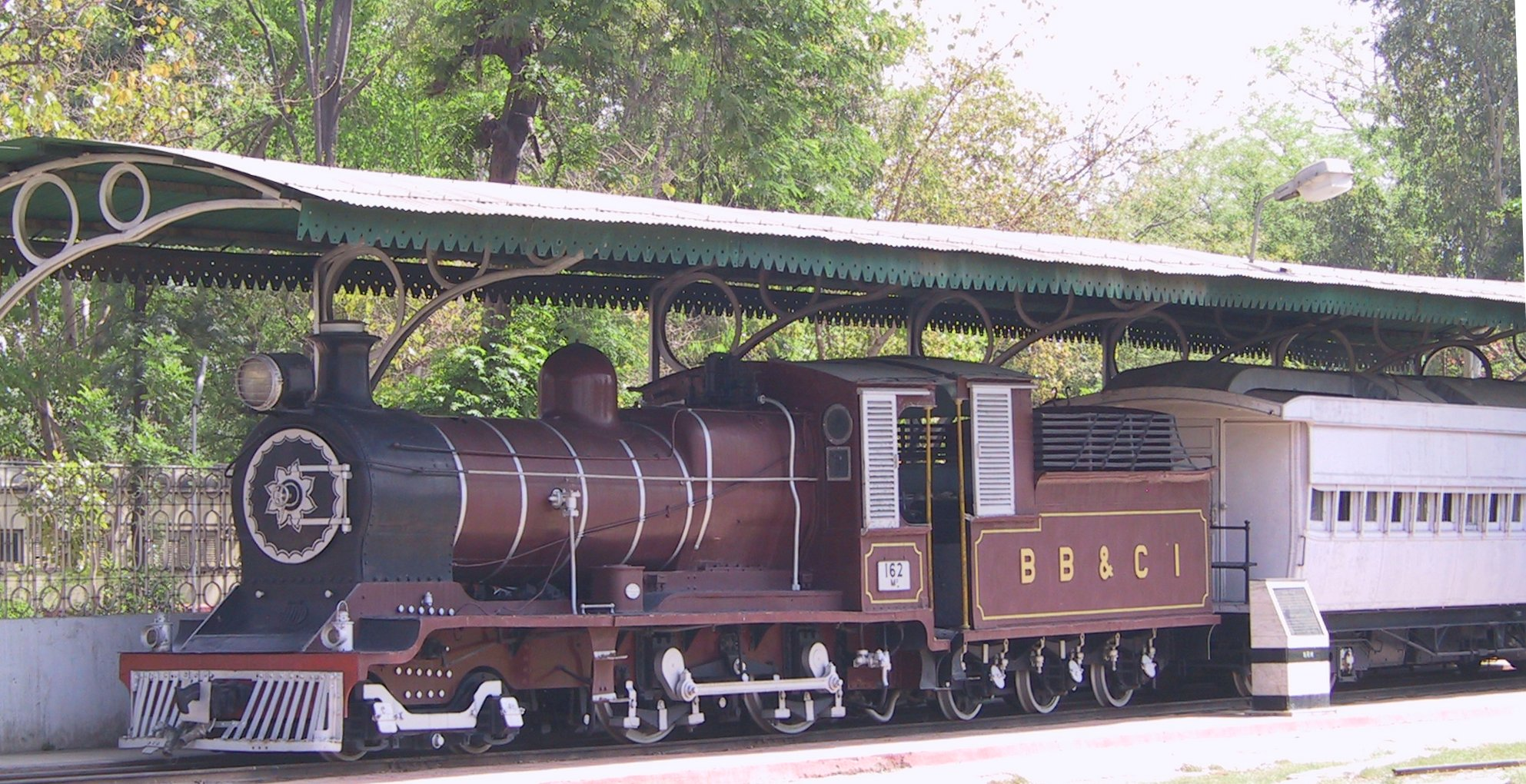
A Bombay, Baroda and Central India Railway Locomotive at the National Rail Museum, New Delhi

Bombay, Baroda and Central India Railway Act 1855
- Act of Parliament
- Parliament of the United Kingdom
- Long title: An Act for incorporating the Bombay, Baroda, and Central India Railway Company; and for other Purposes connected therewith.
- Citation: 18 & 19 Vict. c. cxiii

Dates
- Royal assent: 2 July 1855

Other legislation
- Repealed by: Bombay, Baroda and Central India Railway Act 1906

Status: Repealed

Text of statute as originally enacted

The Bombay, Baroda and Central India Railway (reporting mark BB&CI) was a company incorporated by the Bombay, Baroda and Central India Railway Act 1855 (18 & 19 Vict. c. cxiii) to undertake the task of constructing railway lines between Bombay to the erstwhile Baroda State, that became the present-day Baroda (Vadodara) city in western India. BB&CI completed the work in 1864. The first suburban railway in India was started by BB&CI, operating between Virar and Bombay Backbay station (later extended to Colaba), a railway station in Bombay Backbay in April 1867.

The railway was divided into two main systems, broad (5 ft. 6 in.) and metre gauge. There was also a comparatively small mileage of 2 ft 6 in (762 mm) gauge line worked by the BB&CI on behalf of the Indian States. In 1947 the mileage of the respective portions was stated to be: broad gauge, 1,198 miles, with a further 69 miles worked for Indian States; metre gauge, 1,879 miles, with a further 106 miles worked for Indian States; narrow-gauge, 152 miles, worked for Indian States and various companies. Quadruple track mileage was 22 and double-track 250, the remainder of the system being single-track, whilst running powers were exercised over 147 miles (including the important section from Muttra Junction to Delhi, owned by the Great Indian Peninsula Railway).

The main headquarters of the BB&CI Railway was located at Churchgate, Bombay and the headquarters and workshops for the metre gauge tracks and services was located in Ajmer.

== Construction and opening ==
The first section of the railway was the Ankleshwar - Amroli line (in present-day Gujarat). The first train on this section ran on 10 February 1860. The line was extended to Bulsar by 1862 and to Grant Road by 1864. This was an important milestone, as the BB&CI had now reached the port city of Bombay.

The first train ran between Grant Road and Surat on 28 November 1864, and the Times of India gave a detailed report in the following day's issue. This inaugural train had thirty coaches, consisting of first, second, and third-class accommodation. The last two classes were in much higher demand, and in few passengers travelled First Class. The station at Grant Road was more lavish than the GIP Railway's Bori Bunder Terminus and had a platform comparable in width to the latter station. Some of the Third Class coaches were double-deckers, which gave space for travellers to lie behind seated passengers, with some degree of comfort. These coaches were built at Amroli in about 1863. A 'sloping shade' blocked the heat of the sun while still allowing ventilation.

The first suburban train service began on 1 November 1865, between Grant Road and Bassein Road (today's Vasai Road). Soon after, the platforms of stations between the two local termini were lengthened to 500 yards (about 450 m). The line was extended to Bombay Backbay Station in 1866. Three suburban services ran from the station. Ballast trains from Santacruz, carried earth for the reclamation scheme at Bombay Backbay which was filling in part of the Backbay, a large body of water at South Bombay's seafront. This plan was cut short after the liquidation of the Backbay Reclamation Company, following the end of the American Civil War. Just enough land had been reclaimed to lay tracks to Colaba, with running alongside.

On 12 April 1867, a regular suburban rail service began from Bombay Backbay, to Viraur (present day Virar). The stations on the route were: Bombay Backbay, Grant Road, Dadur (Dadar), Mahim, Bandora (Bandra), Santacruz, Andaru (Andheri), Pahadi (near Goregaon), Berewali (Borivali), Panjo (on the Panju island between the Vasai Creeks), Bassein Rd (Vasai Rd), Neela (Nallasopara), and finally, Viraur (Virar). This line was extended to Charni Road in 1868, and to Churchgate on 10 January 1870. The line to Colaba was completed by 1873, and a semi permanent goods terminus was established. The Colaba Terminus station was later rebuilt as a grand station, and re-opened on 7 April 1896.

During the second phase of the 1860s Backbay Reclamation project, the Churchgate-Colaba line was removed and a new Bombay Central station was opened in 1930.

The section from Godhra to Nagda opened in 1896 and extended to Baroda. Nagda to Muttra Junction was opened in 1909, making possible through broad-gauge running between Bombay and Delhi.

The metre-gauge system was originally the Rajputana Malwa State Railway and was taken over subsequently by the BB&CI. The metre-gauge main line from Delhi to Jaipur was completed in 1874, extended to Ajmer in 1875 and to Ahmedabad in 1881. The branch from Rewari to Bhatinda and Fazilka was begun in 1881 by the Ferozepore & Rewari Railway, but the section between Bhatinda and Ferozepore was subsequently built to the broad-gauge and passed to the GIPR.

== Description of systems ==
The broad-gauge main line ran northwards from Bombay to Baroda, where it bifurcated, the north-east main line continuing towards Delhi, and the north-west main line to the industrial city of Ahmedabad and onwards to Viramgam and Kharagoda. The north-east main line passed through Godhra, Ratlam, Kotah and Bayana (from where a branch line ran to Agra Fort), to Muttra Junction, where it joined the Great Indian Peninsular Railway, over which it had running powers for 90 miles into Delhi.

The metre-gauge system was originally the Rajputana Malwa State Railway. It began at Ahmedabad and ran northwards through Baroda State and Rajputana via Abu, Ajmer, Jaipur and Rewari to Delhi. There were branches from Rewari to Bhatinda and Fazilka, from Ajmer to Ratlam, Indore and Khandwa, and from Achnera to Cawnpore.

== Organisation ==
The original Bombay, Baroda and Central India Railway Company was purchased by the Government of India in 1905, but continued to be worked by a company with a board of directors in London until 1 January 1942, on which date the working was taken over by the government and it became part of the Indian State Railway system, directly under the Railway Board.

== Electrification ==
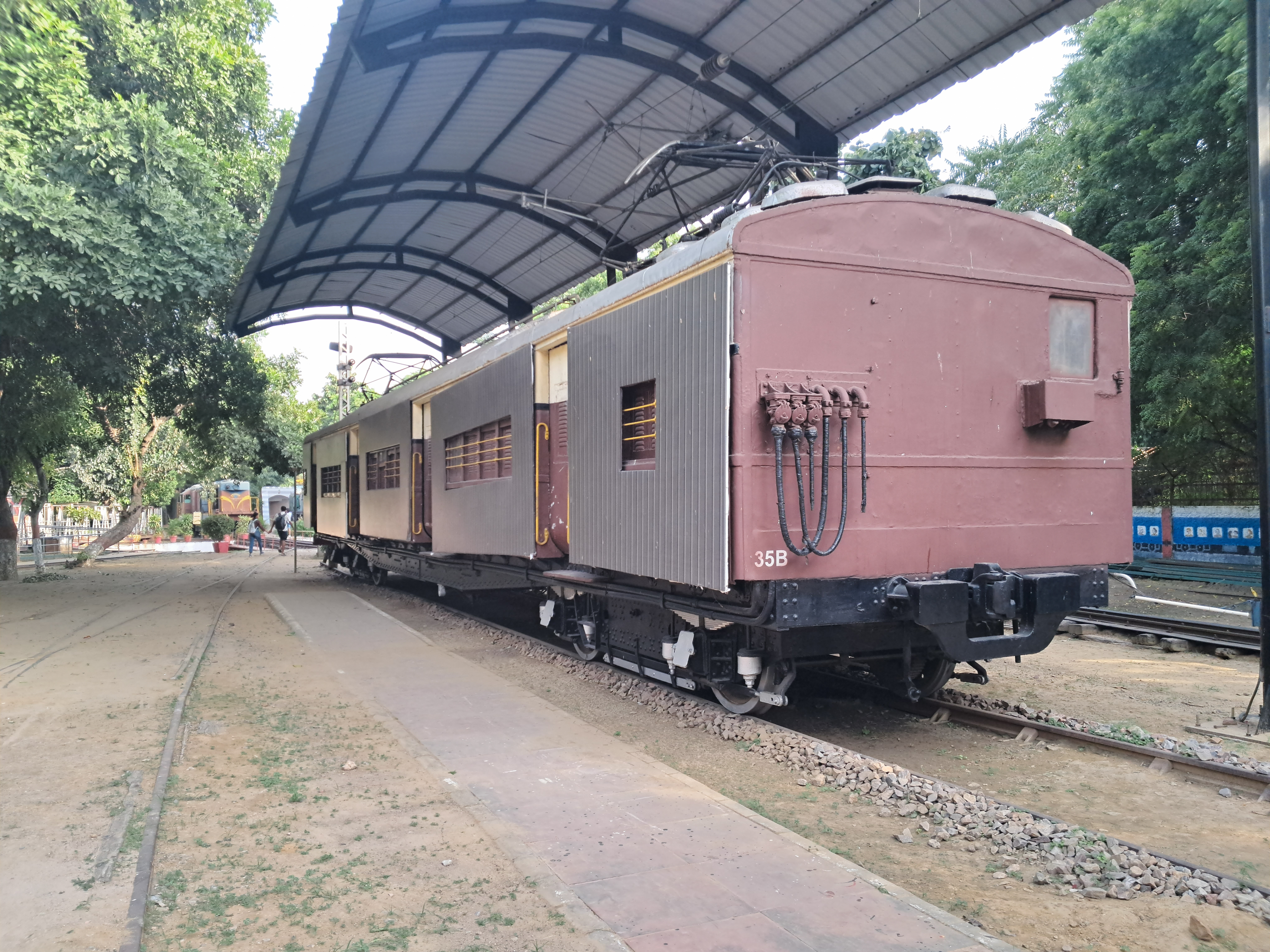
An early BB&CI Electric EMU at NRM, New Delhi

The Colaba-Borivali section (37.8 km) was electrified on 5 January 1928 on the 1.5 kV DC system. The two tracks between Colaba and Grant Road and four tracks between Grant Road and Bandra railway stations were electrified. Only two suburban tracks between Bandra and Borivali were electrified in 1928, while two main tracks were left for steam locomotives. In 1933, Colaba railway station and two electrified tracks between Colaba and Churchgate railway stations were dismantled. In 1936, electrification was extended to the two main tracks between Bandra and Borivali railway stations, left earlier and the two main tracks between Borivali and Virar railway stations were also electrified, resulting in completion of the electrification of the Churchgate-Virar section.

== Locomotives and rolling stock ==
By the end of 1877 the company owned 77 steam locomotives, 295 coaches and 2,644 goods wagons. At the end of 1910 there were 7272 goods wagons. In 1936 the BB&CI owned 833 locomotives, 43 railcars, 1963 coaches and over 20.000 goods wagons.

In 1947, the total numbers of broad-gauge locomotives in service were 363 steam, 10 diesel and 2 electric. There were 1,042 passenger coaches (including 40 electric motor and 120 electric trailer coaches) and 10,584 goods wagons.

The equivalent figures for the metre-gauge were 437 locomotives, 1,335 coaches, 3 Sentinel steam coaches, and 9,127 wagons.

On the 2 ft 6 in (762 mm) gauge there were 20 locomotives, 58 coaches and 259 wagons.

== Classification ==
It was labeled as a Class I railway according to Indian Railway Classification System of 1926.

== Later developments ==
In 1949, after independence of India, Gaekwar's Baroda State Railway was merged in to Bombay, Baroda and Central India Railway by Government of India.

On 5 November 1951 the Bombay, Baroda and Central India Railway was merged with the Saurashtra Railway, Rajputana Railway, Jaipur State Railway and Cutch State Railway to give rise to the Western Railway.

== Gandhi film ==
The railway is featured in many travel scenes in the 1982 film Gandhi which tells the story of the leader of India's independence movement, Gandhi played by the actor Ben Kingsley.

== See also ==
- Frederick William Stevens, architect and engineer
- Charles Ollivant, company director
