= Bilimora–Waghai section =

Railway section in India

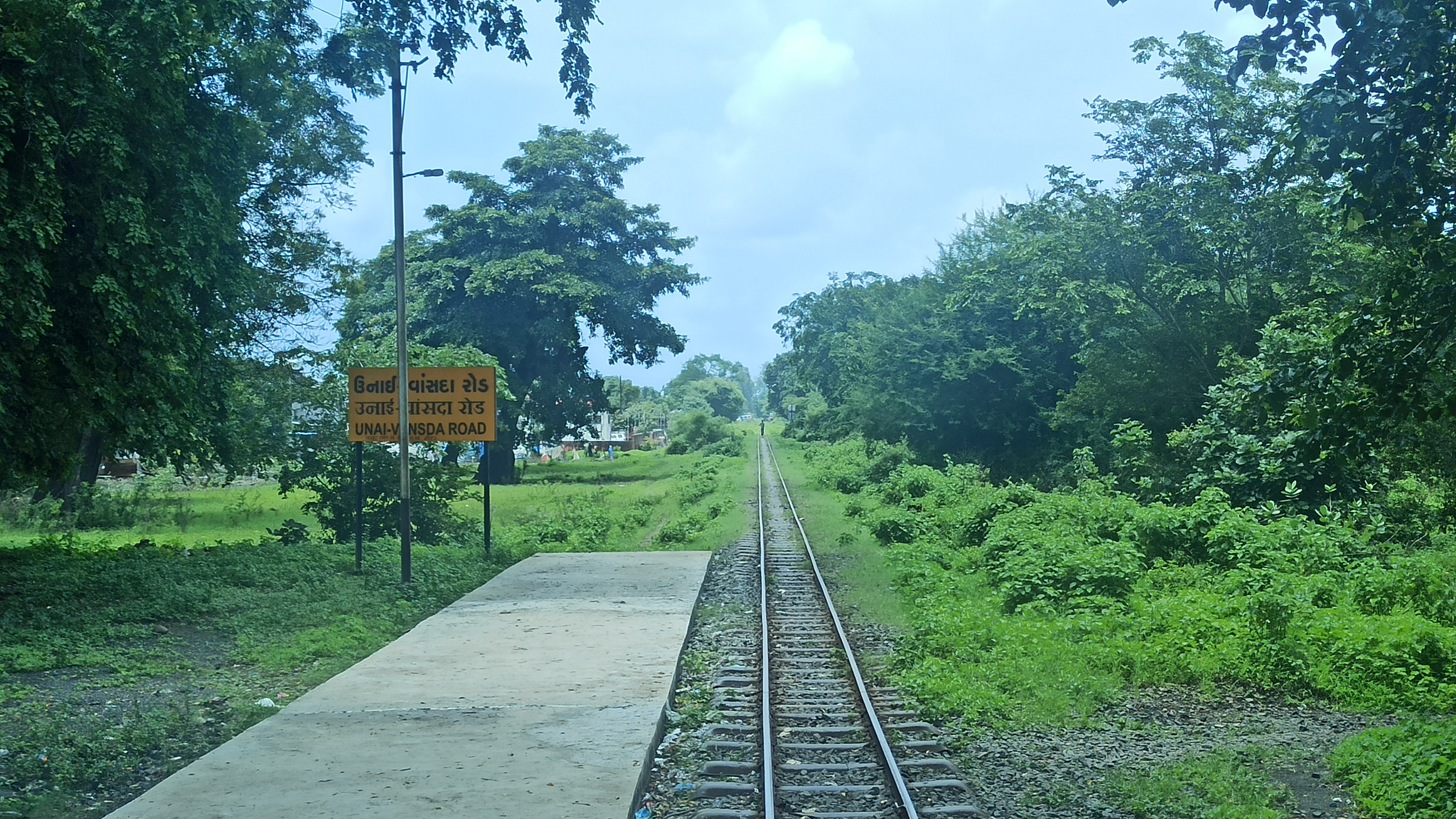
- Unai railway station on Bilimora–Waghai section

Overview
- Status: Operational
- Owner: Indian Railways
- Locale: Gujarat
- Termini: Bilimora; Waghai
- Stations: 9

Service
- Operator(s): Western Railway

Technical
- Track length: 63 km (39 mi)
- Number of tracks: 1
- Track gauge: 2 ft 6 in (762 mm)
- Electrification: No

The Bilimora–Waghai section belongs to Mumbai WR division of Western Railway zone in Gujarat State of India.

== History ==
Bilimora-Rankuwa branch was opened in 1914. The length of Bilimora-Rankuwa branch was 21 km. Rankuwa-Unai branch was opened in 1915. The length of Rankuwa-Unai branch was 20 km. Unai-Kalamba branch was opened in 1917. The length of Unai-Kalamba branch was 14 km. Kalamba-Dungarda and Dungarda-Waghai branch was opened in 1926 and 1929 respectively. Total length of Bilimora–Waghai section is 63 km.

The 63-km Bilimora–Waghai track was laid by the British at the instance of the Sayajirao Gaekwad in 1913. It was a part of Gaekwad's Baroda State Railway, the railway line owned by the Princely State of Baroda which was ruled by the Gaekwad dynasty. The main intention was to keep their connection with the royal state. The Gaekwad rulers also used this train for transportation of precious teak wood from forests. After independence of India, Gaekwad's Baroda State Railway was merged and became a part of Western Railway.

In December 2020, Railway Board decided to close 11 sections including Bilimora–Waghai section permanently. BJP MLA from Dang, Vijay Patel, Congress MLA of Vansda, Anant Patel and Bipin Bhai, a social worker of Waghai, started a movement to restart the train services for tribals. Anant Patel also started a relay of protest at each of the railway stations on the route.

Minister of State for Railways and Textiles, Darshana Jardosh announced the resumption of the narrow gauge train service between Bilimora and Waghai. Bilimora–Waghai narrow gauge heritage train service was started with air-conditioned tourist coach from 4 September 2021.

== Gallery ==
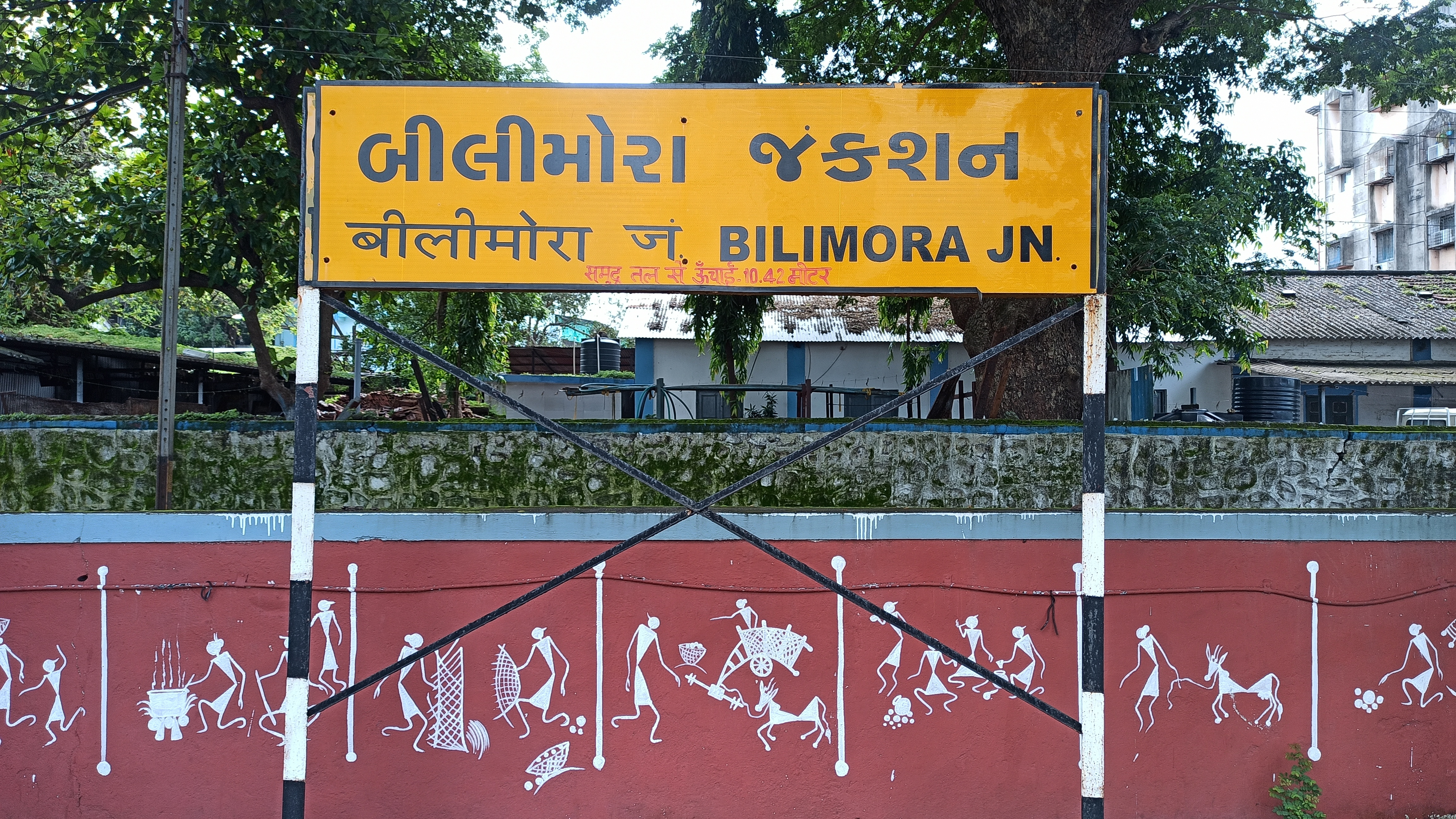
Bilimora Junction

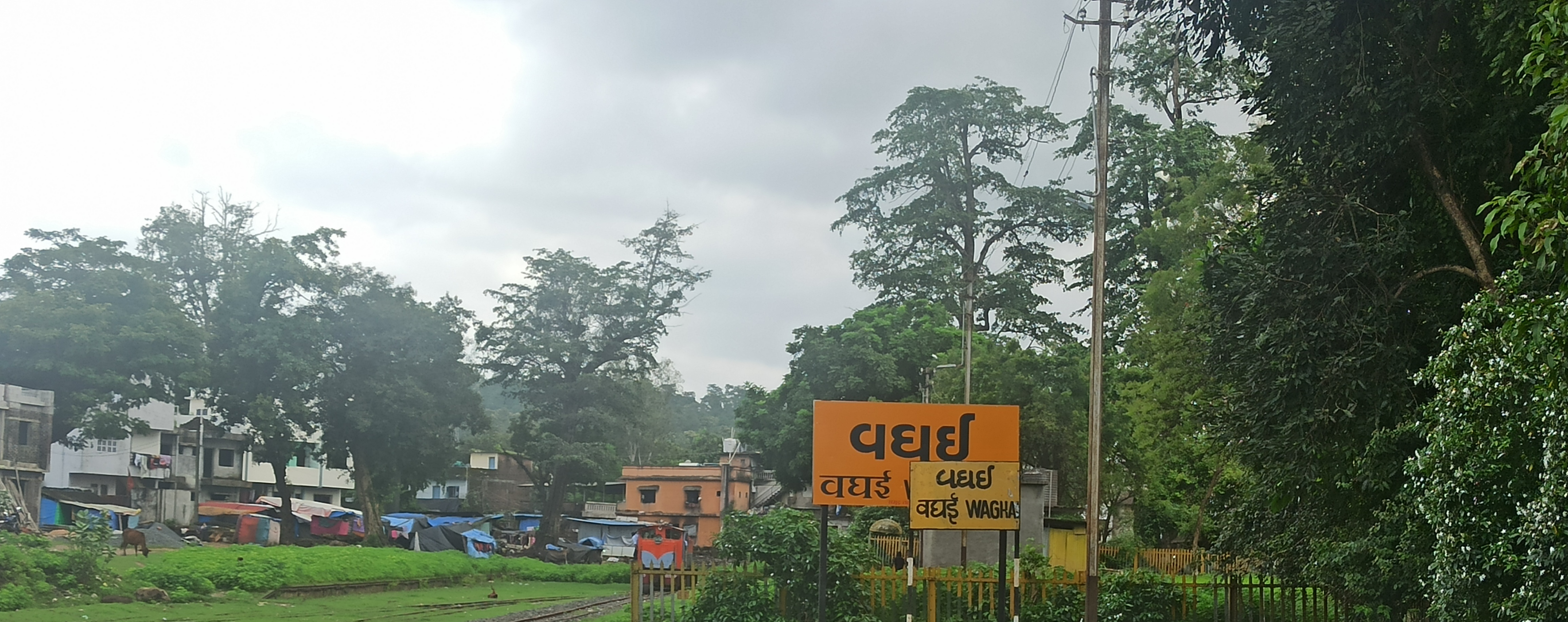
Waghai Station

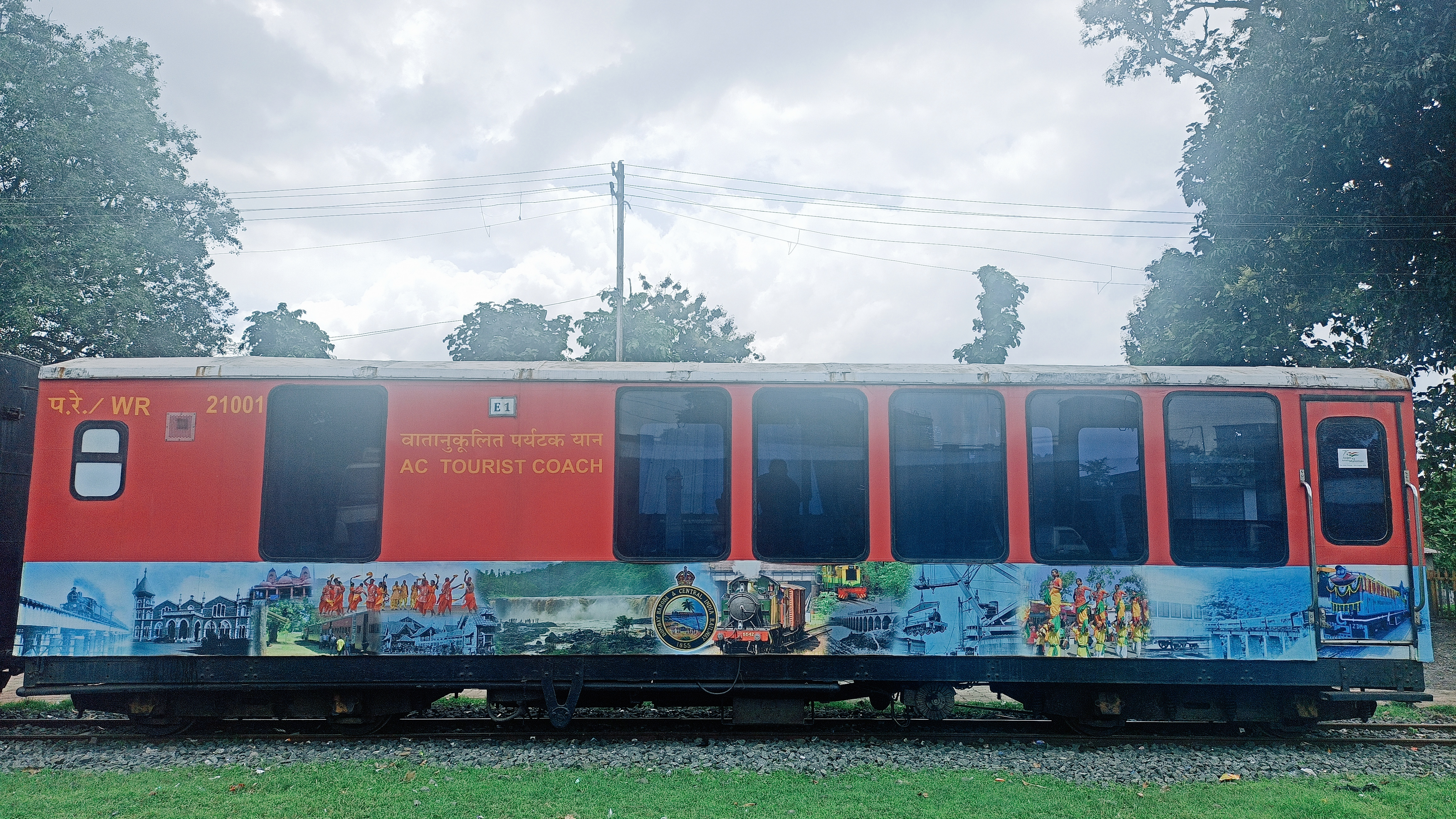
AC Vistadome tourist coach

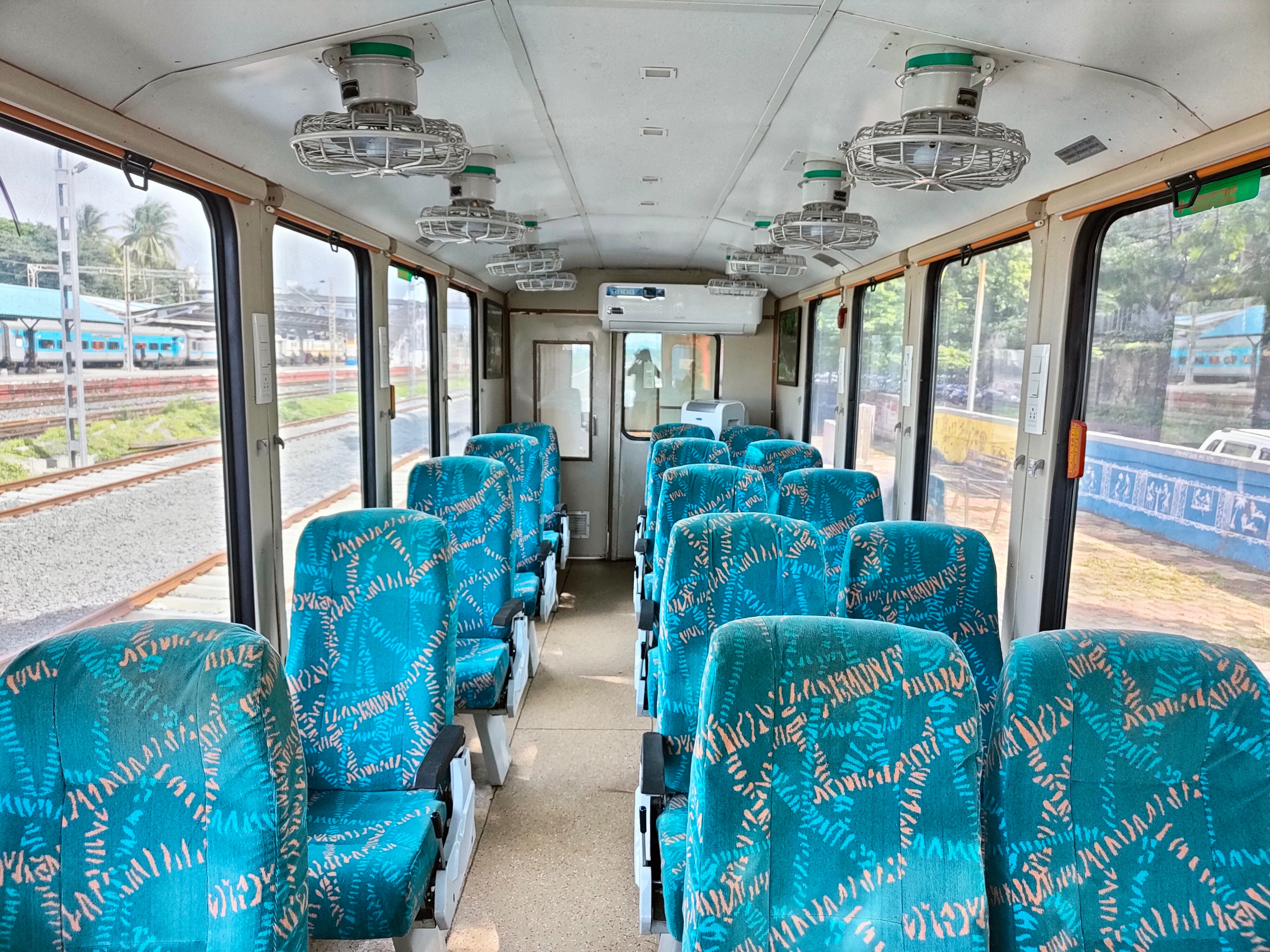
Vistadome coach interior

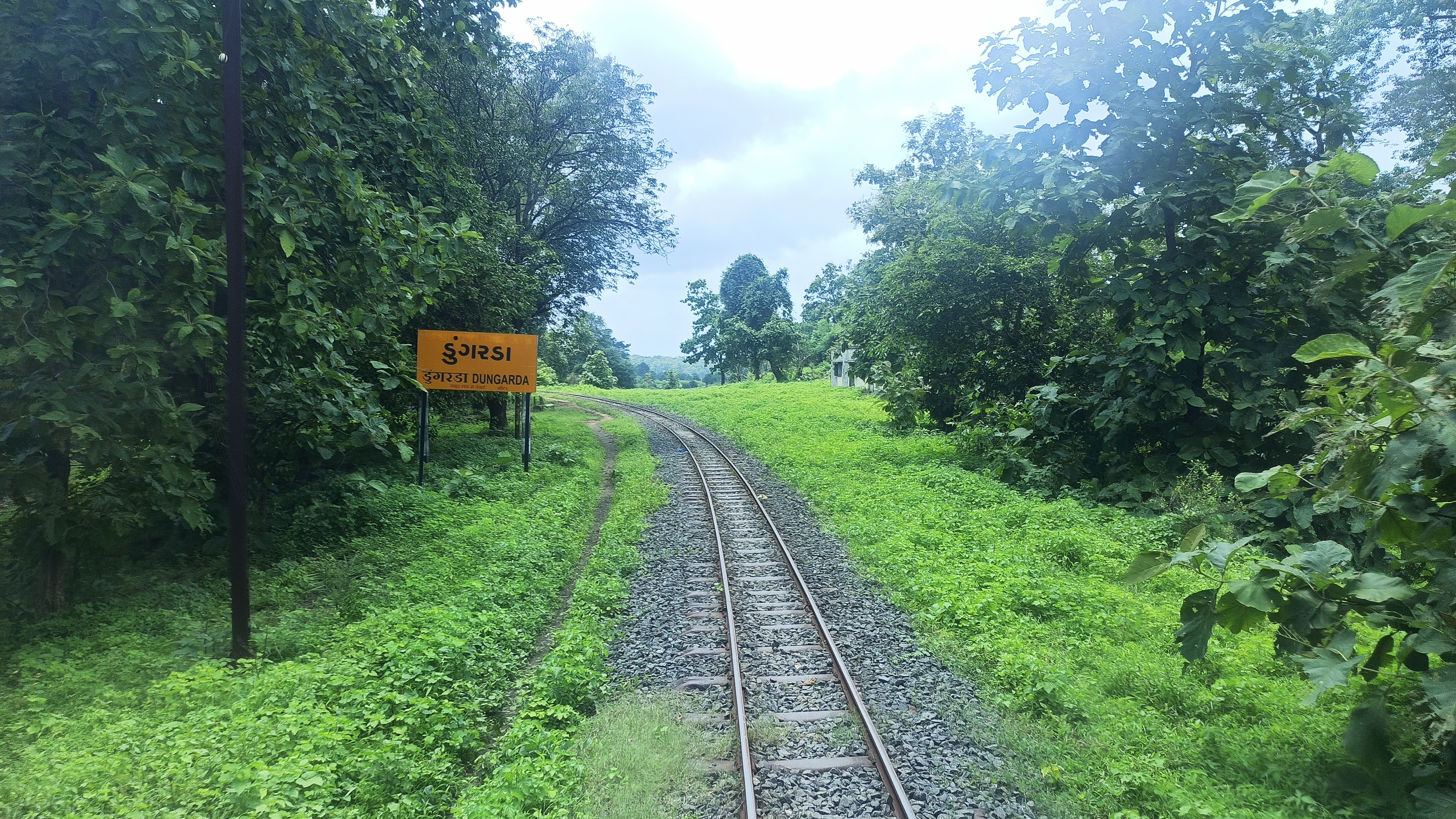
Dungarda Station

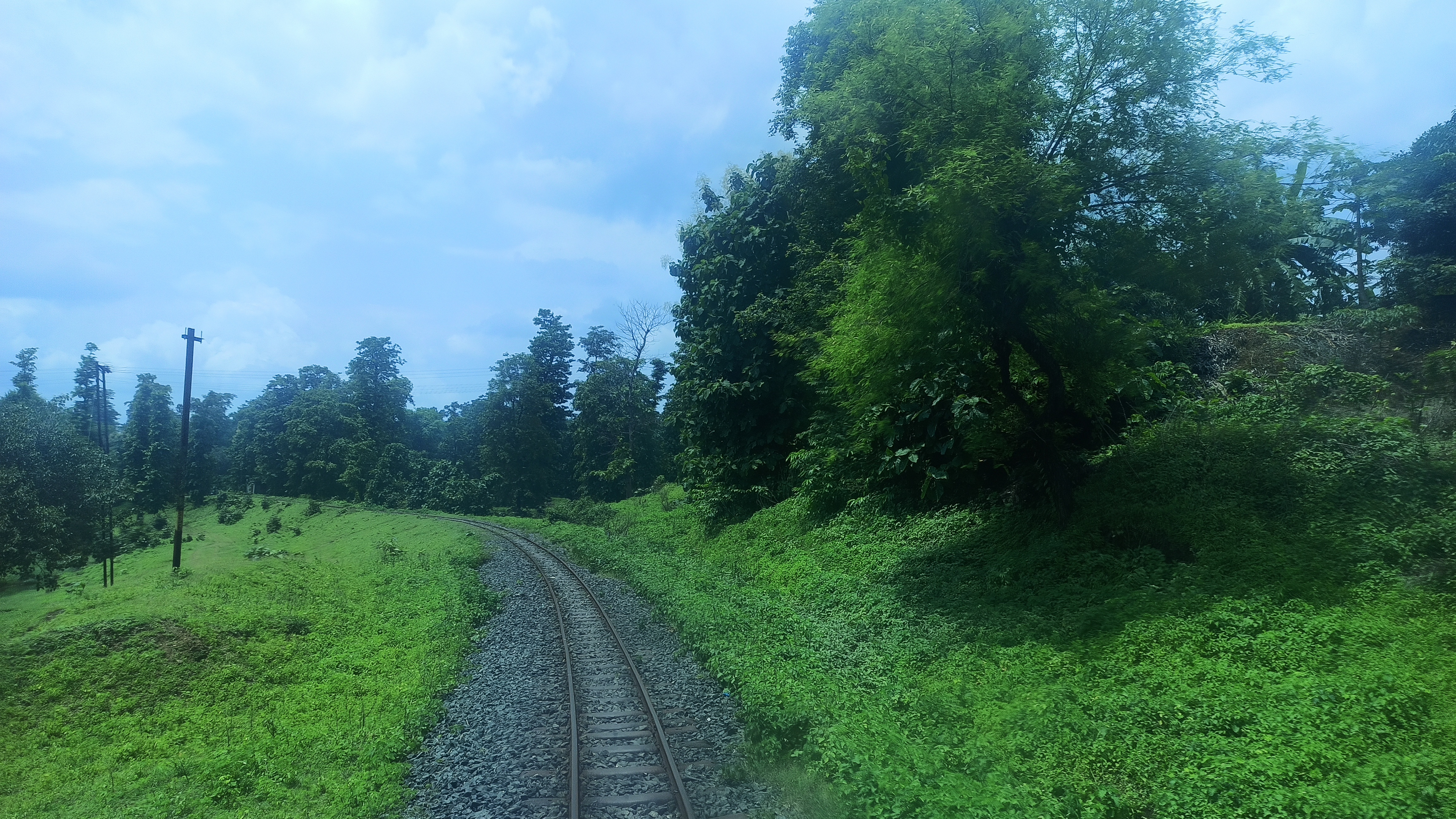
Bilimora - Waghai Section View 1

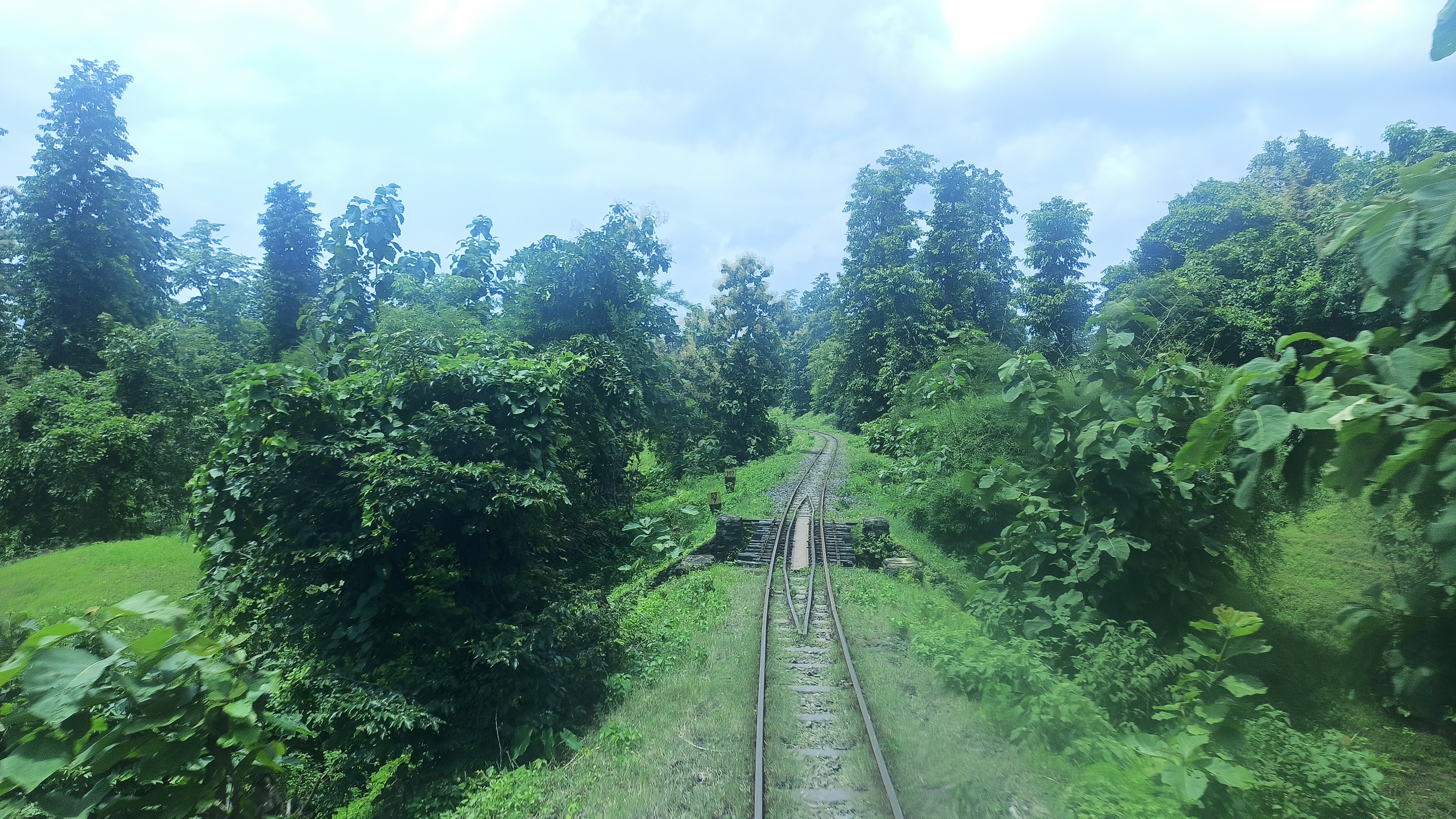
Bilimora - Waghai Section View 2

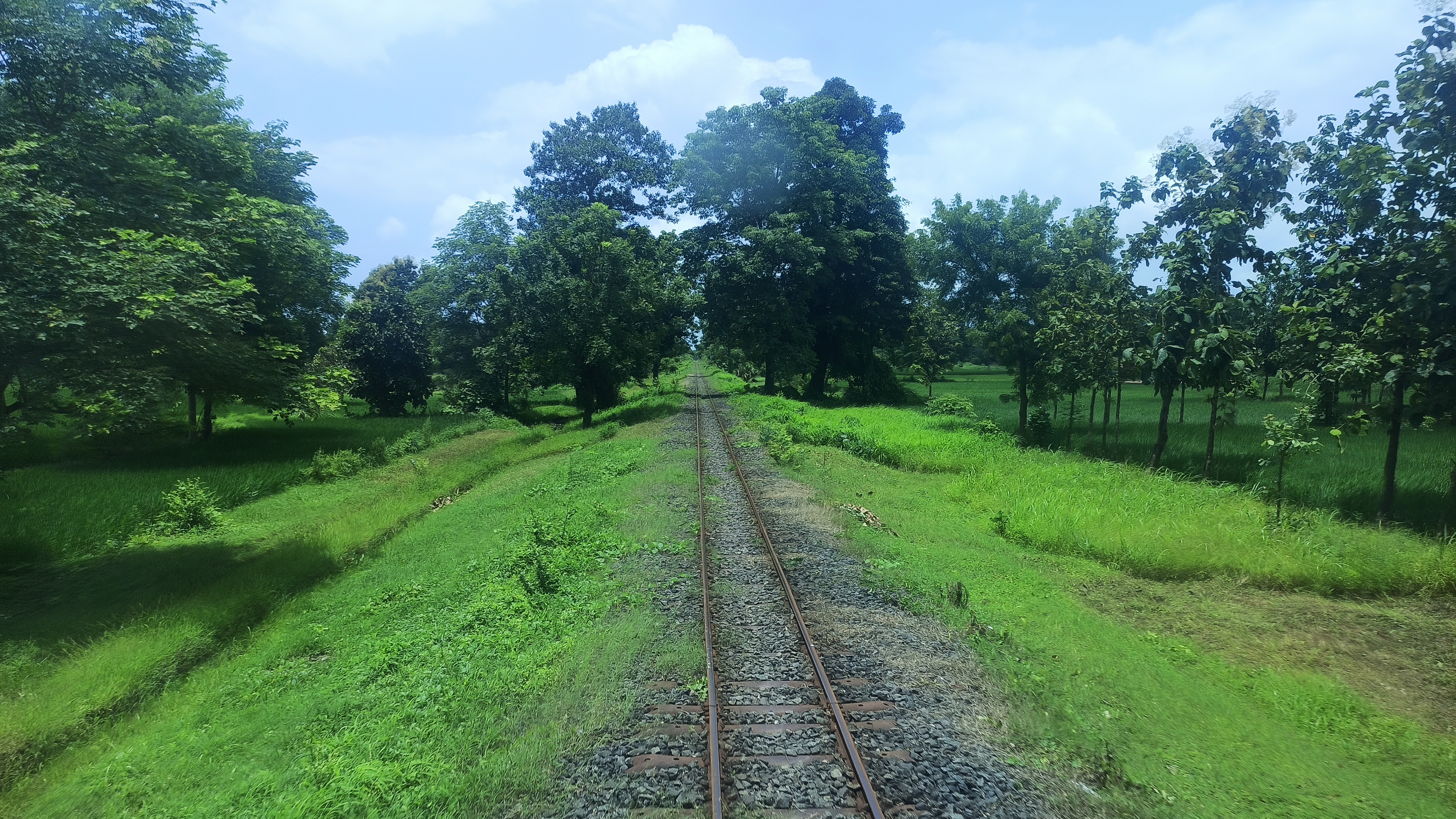
Bilimora - Waghai Section View 3

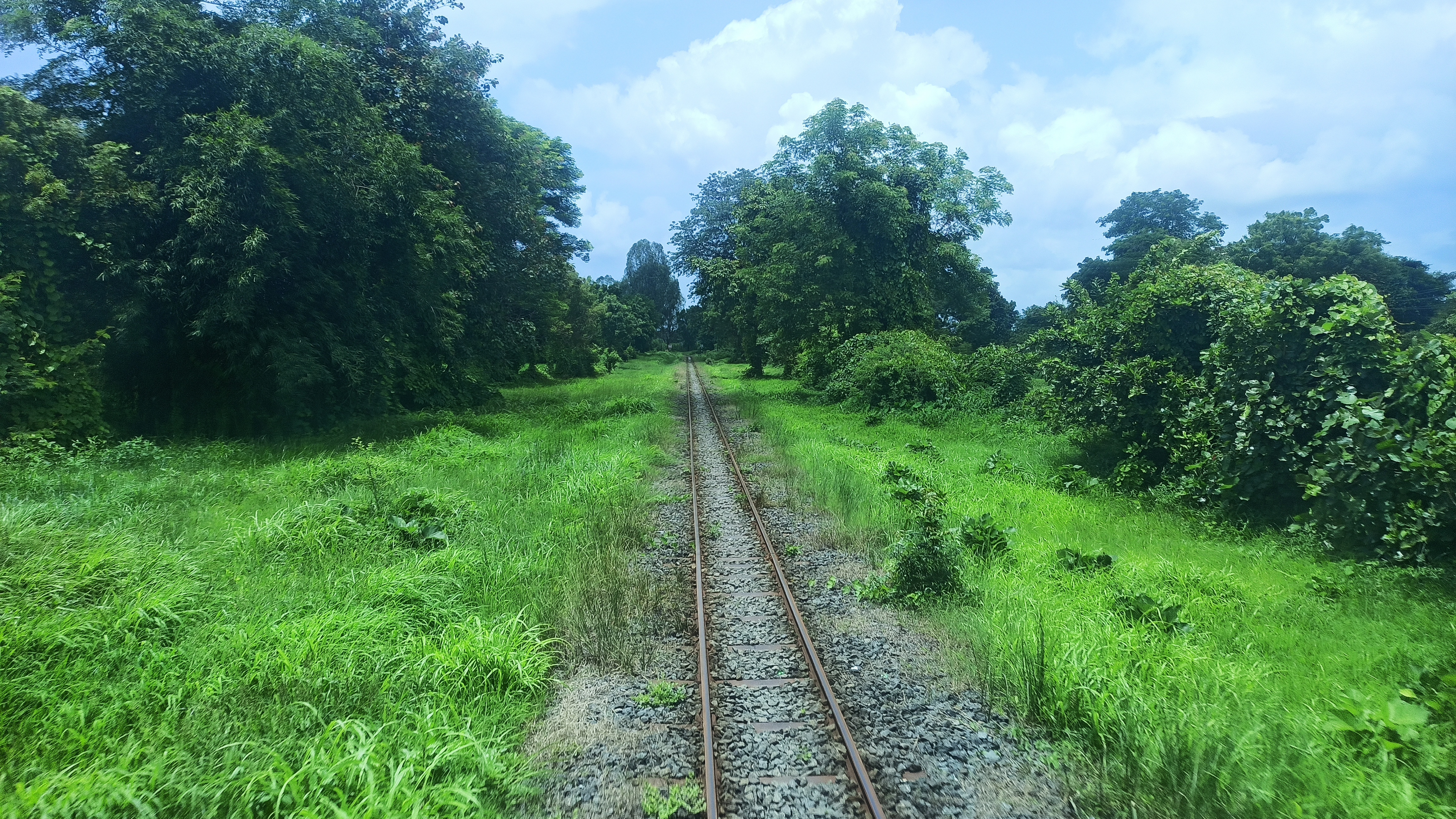
Bilimora - Waghai Section View 4

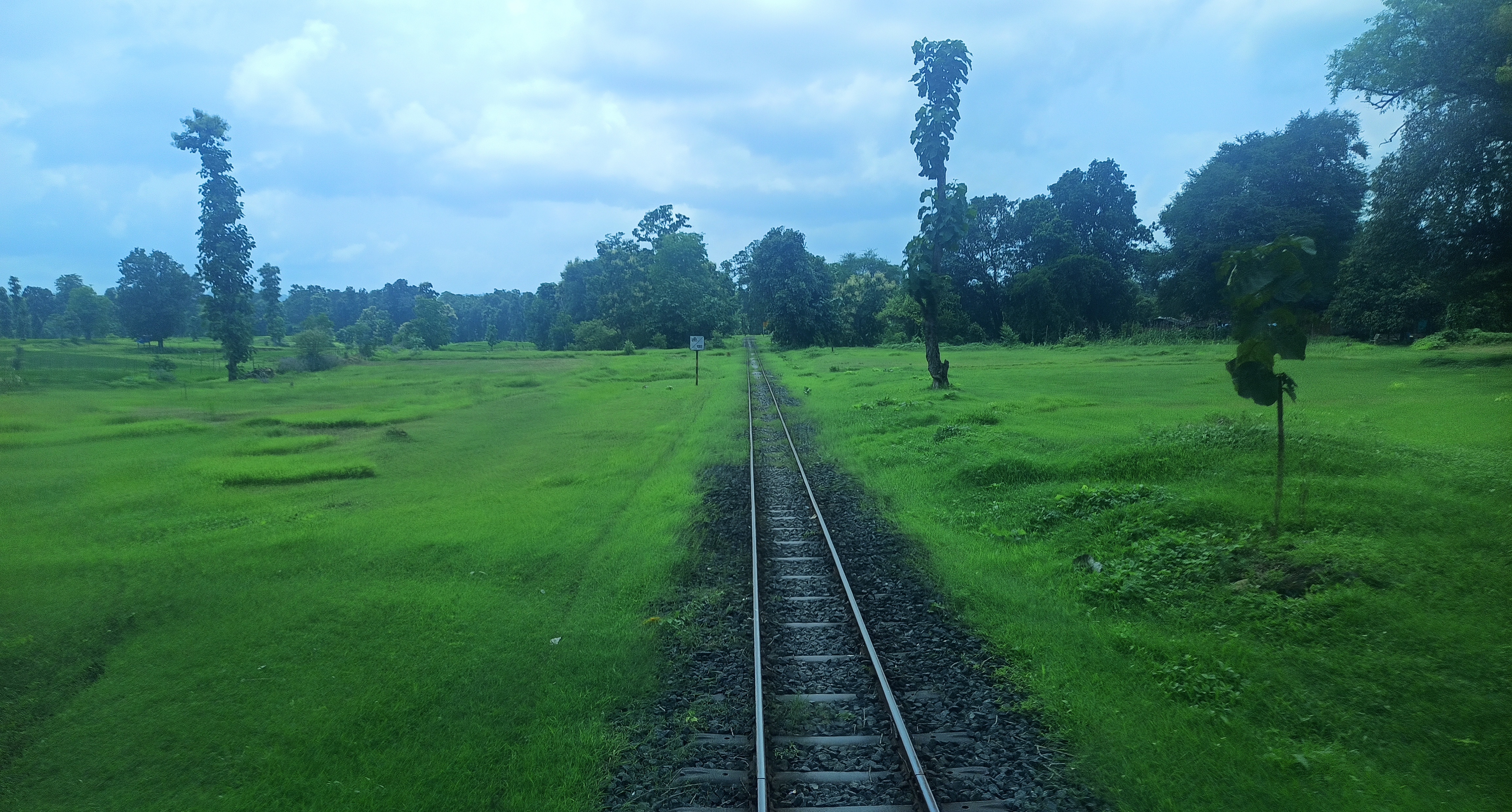
Bilimora - Waghai Section View 5

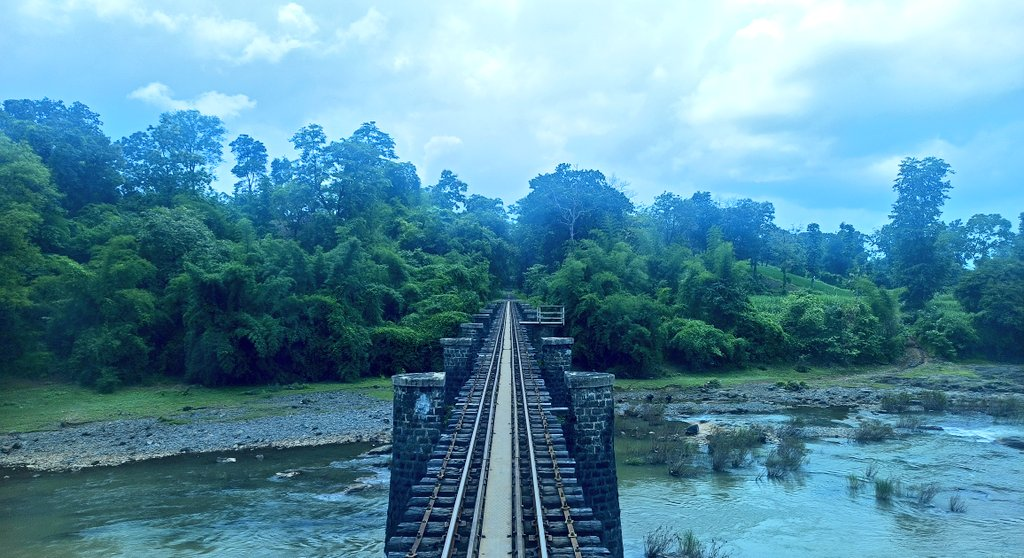
Ambika River Bridge

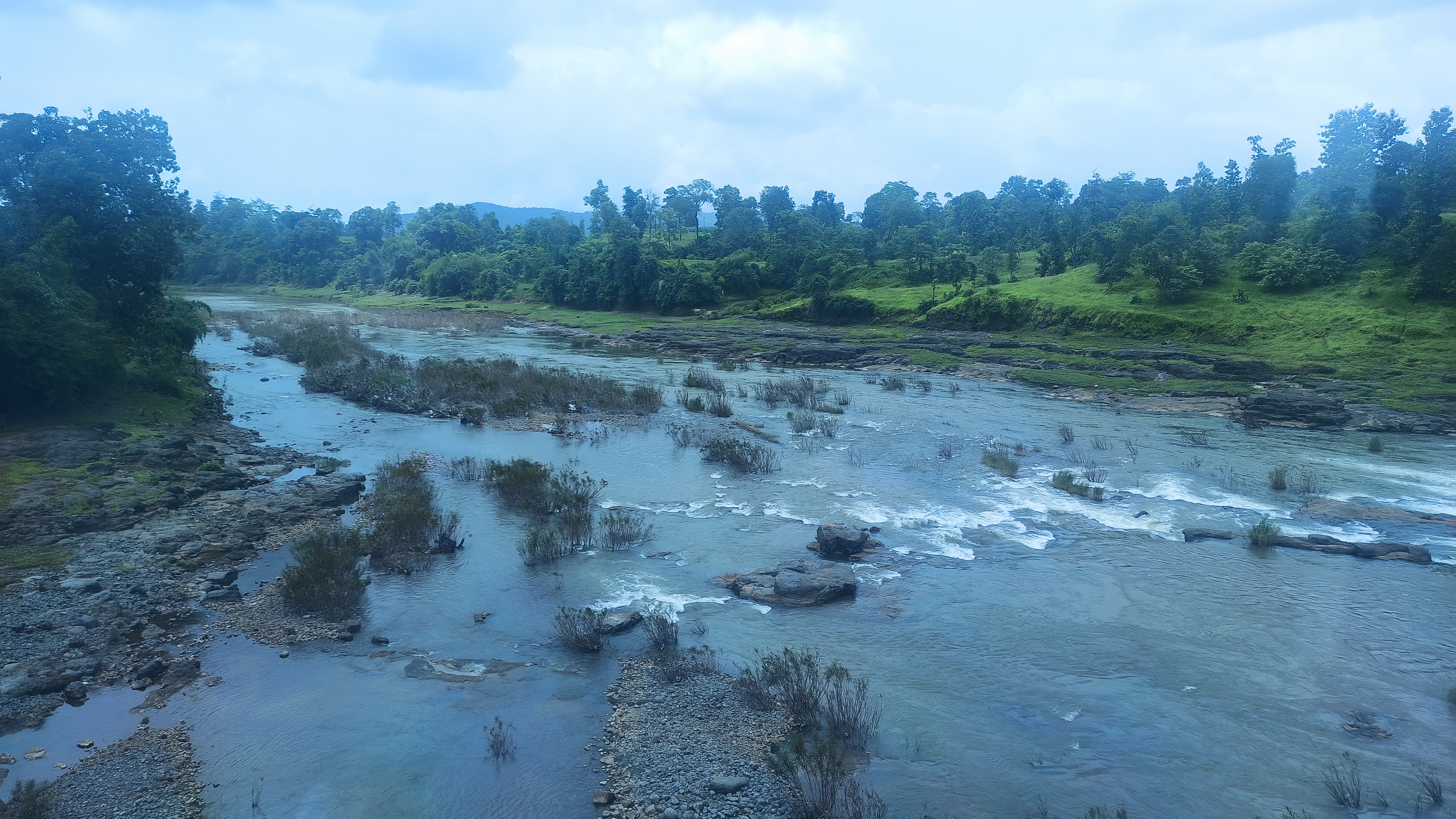
Ambika River Bridge View

== See also ==
- Mountain railways of India
