= Waghai railway station =

Railway station in Gujarat, India

Waghai
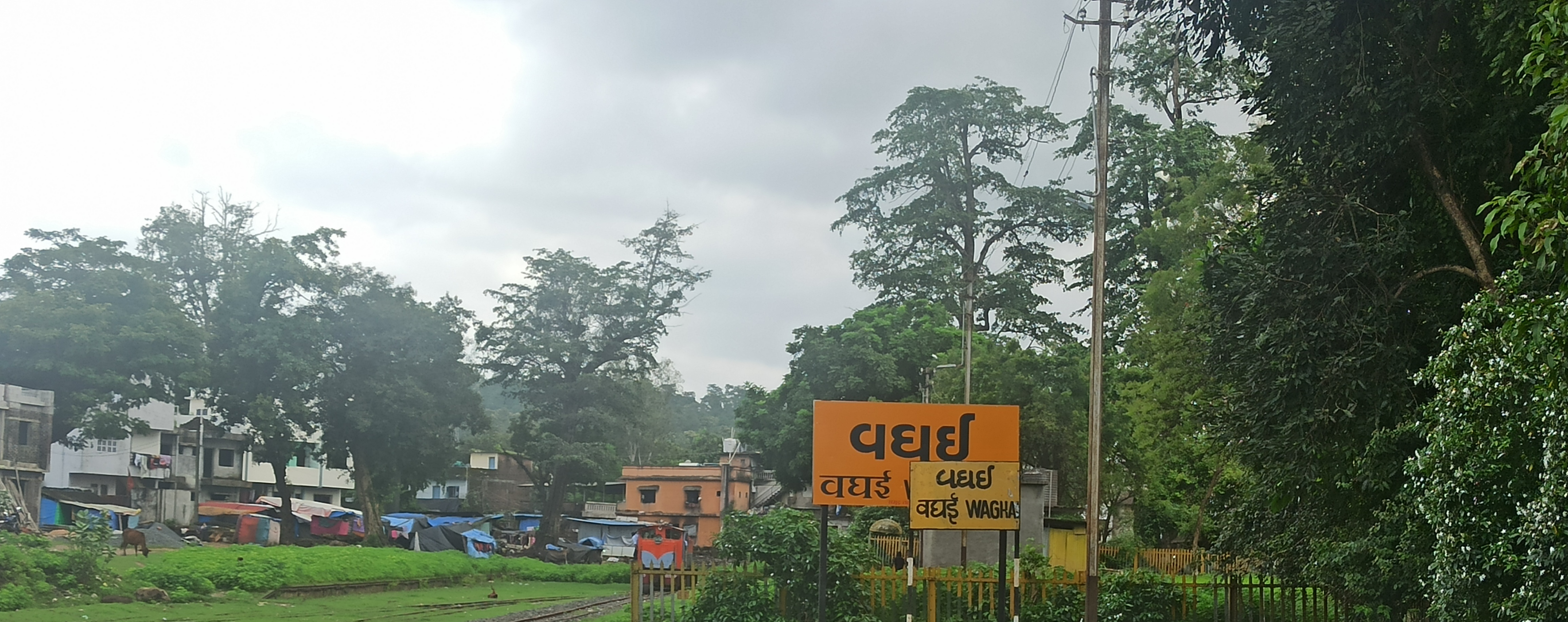

General information
- Location: Waghai, Gujarat; India
- Coordinates: 20°46′25″N 73°29′51″E
- Elevation: 145 metres (476 ft)
- System: Indian Railways station
- Owner: Indian Railways
- Operator: Western Railway
- Line: Bilimora–Waghai section
- Platforms: 1
- Tracks: 2

Construction
- Structure type: Ground
- Parking: No
- Cycle facilities: No

Other information
- Status: Functioning
- Station code: WGI
- Zone(s): Western Railway
- Division(s): Mumbai WR

History
- Electrified: Ongoing
Location
- Location within India Location within Gujarat

Waghai railway station is a small railway station in Dang district, Gujarat, India. Its code is WGI. It serves Waghai town. The station consists of 1 platform. The platforms are not well sheltered. It lacks many facilities including water and sanitation. Two trains originate from here.

== Trains ==
Following trains originate from Waghai railway station :

- 09501/02 Waghai - Bilimora NG Passenger Special
- 09072/71 Waghai - Bilimora NG Passenger Special

Train number	Station code	Departure station	Departure time	Departure day	Arrival station	Arrival time	Arrival day
09072	WGI	Waghai	06:00 AM	Daily	Bilimora Jn	09:20 AM	Daily
09501	BIM	Bilimora Jn	10:20 AM	Daily	Waghai	13:20 PM	Daily
09502	WGI	Waghai	14:30 PM	Daily	Bilimora Jn	17:35 PM	Daily
09071	BIM	Bilimora Jn	19:40 PM	Daily	Waghai	22:40 PM	Daily
