= 2019 Indian general election =

- 11 April – 19 May 2019 (Note: The election for the Vellore constituency was delayed and took place on 5 August 2019.)

543 of the 545 seats in the Lok Sabha (Note: Two seats were reserved for Anglo-Indians and filled through Presidential nomination.) 272 seats needed for a majority
- Opinion polls
- Registered: 911,950,734
- Turnout: 67.4% (▲0.96pp)
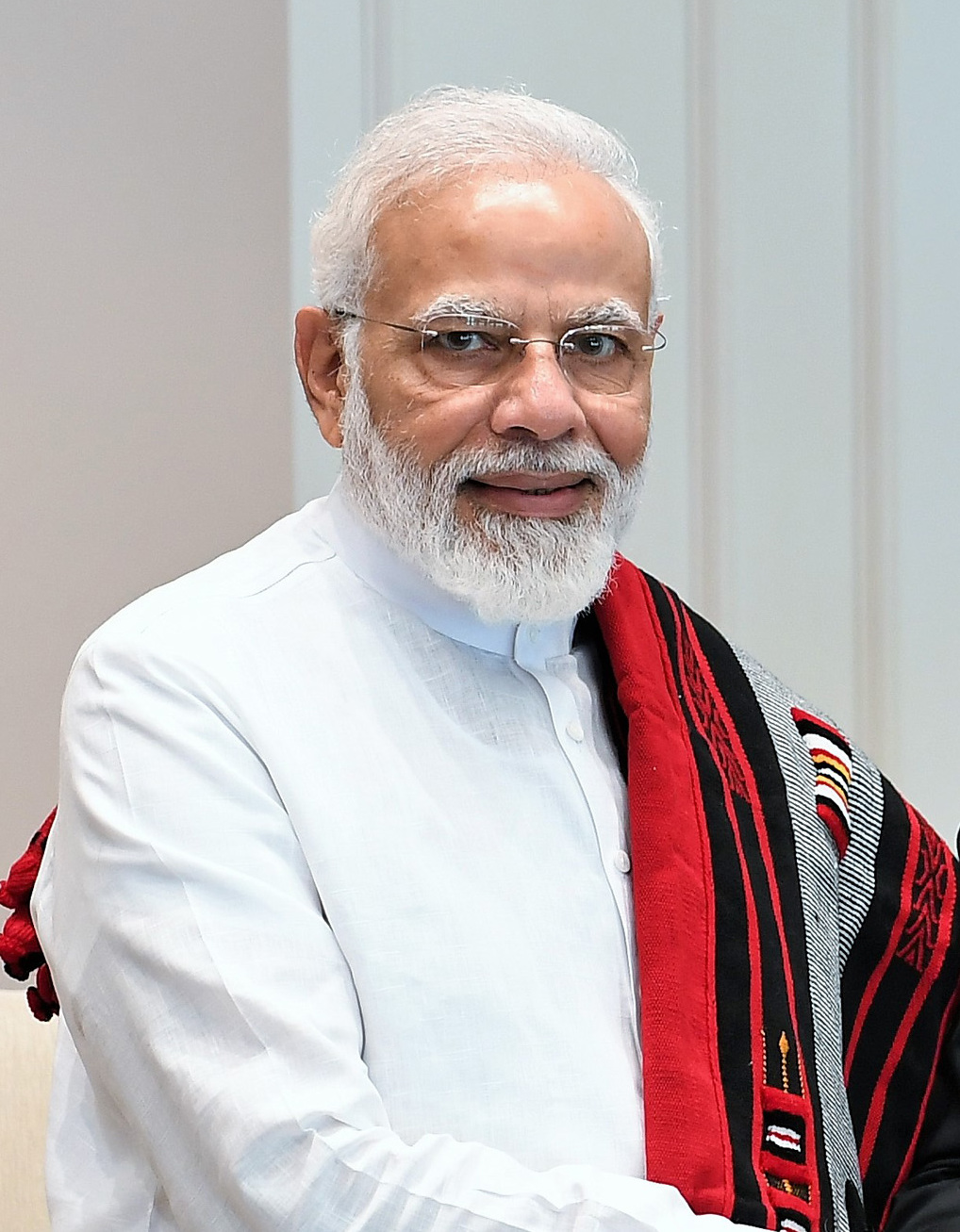

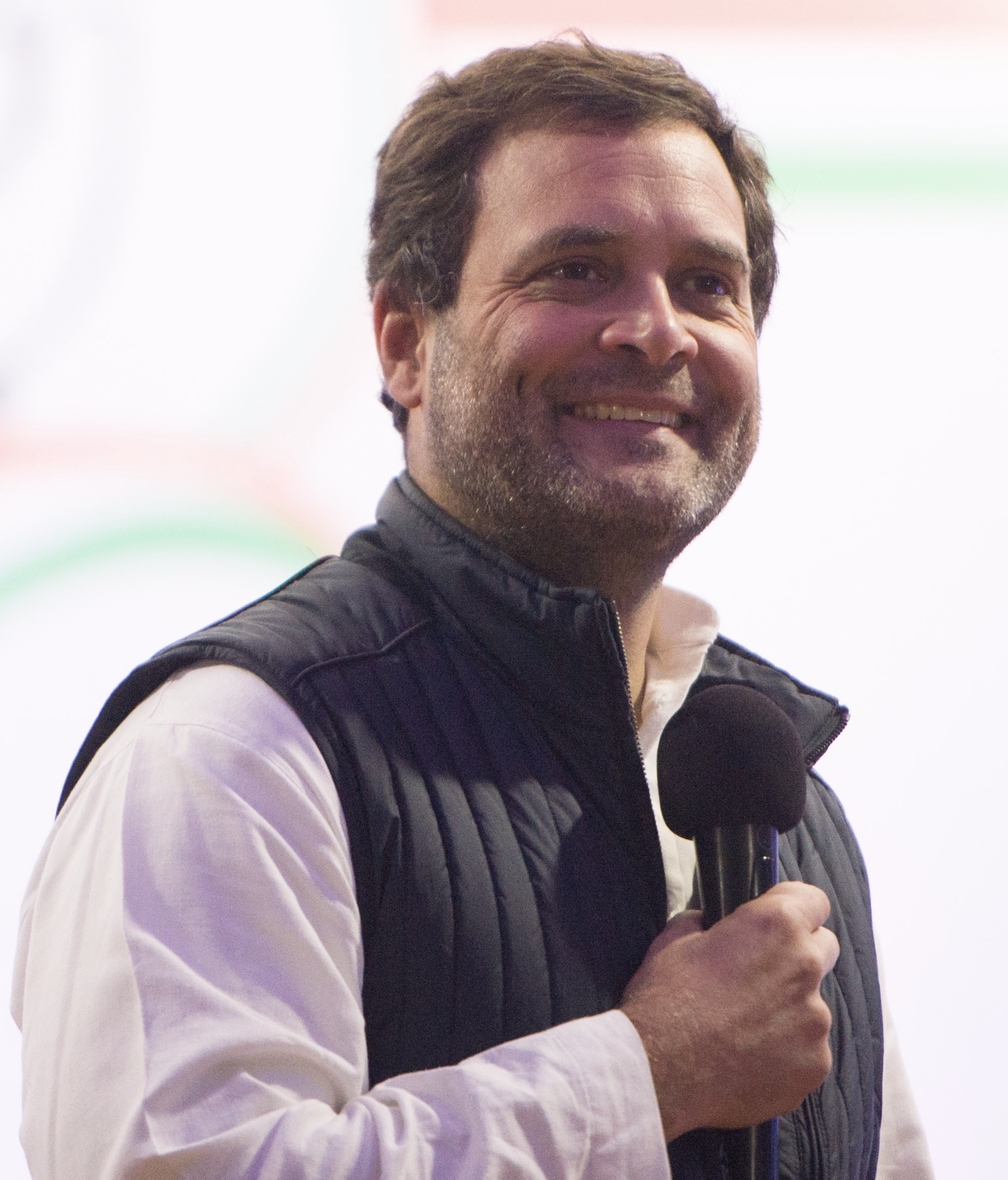
	First party	Second party
Leader	Narendra Modi	Rahul Gandhi
Party	BJP	INC
Alliance	NDA	UPA
Leader's seat	Varanasi (won)	Wayanad (won); Amethi (lost)
Last election	31.00%, 282 seats	19.31%, 44 seats
Seats won	303	52
Seat change	▲21	▲8
Popular vote	229,076,879	119,495,214
Percentage	37.36%	19.49%
Swing	▲6.36pp	▲0.18pp
Alliance seats	353	91
Seat change	▲17	▲31
Alliance percentage	45.3%	27.5%
Prime Minister before election
Narendra Modi
BJP
Prime Minister after election
Narendra Modi
BJP

General elections were held in India in seven phases from 11 April to 19 May 2019 to elect the members of the 17th Lok Sabha. Votes were counted and the result was declared on 23 May. Around 912 million people were eligible to vote, and voter turnout was over 67 percent – the highest ever in any Indian general election, as well as the highest ever participation by women voters until the 2024 Indian general election. (Note: In 9 states and union territories of India – such as Arunachal Pradesh, Kerala and Uttarakhand – more women turned out to vote than men in 2019.)

The Bharatiya Janata Party won in a landslide receiving 37% of the vote, the highest vote share by a political party since the 1989 general election, and winning 303 seats, further increasing its substantial majority. In addition, the BJP-led National Democratic Alliance (NDA) won 353 seats. The BJP outperformed most exit polls which had predicted a much narrower mandate for the ruling alliance. The BJP won 37.76% of votes, while the NDA's combined vote was 45% of the 603.7 million votes that were polled. The Indian National Congress won 52 seats, failing to get 10% of the seats needed to claim the post of Leader of the Opposition. In addition, the Congress-led United Progressive Alliance (UPA) won 91 seats, while other parties won 98 seats.

Legislative assembly elections in the states of Andhra Pradesh, Arunachal Pradesh, Odisha and Sikkim were held simultaneously with the general election, as well as by-elections of twenty-two seats of the Tamil Nadu Legislative Assembly.

== Electoral system ==
All 543 elected MPs are elected from single-member constituencies using first-past-the-post voting. The President of India appoints an additional two members from the Anglo-Indian community if he believes that community is under-represented.

Eligible voters must be Indian citizens, 18 or older, an ordinary resident of the polling area of the constituency and registered to vote (name included in the electoral rolls), possess a valid voter identification card issued by the Election Commission of India or an equivalent. Some people convicted of electoral or other offences are barred from voting.

The elections are held on schedule and as per the Constitution of India that mandates parliamentary elections once every five years.

== Election schedule ==
Election schedule

The election schedule was announced by Election Commission of India (ECI) on 10 March 2019, and with it the Model Code of Conduct came into effect.

The election was scheduled to be held in seven phases. In Bihar, Uttar Pradesh and West Bengal, the election was held in all seven phases. The polling for the Anantnag constituency in the state of Jammu and Kashmir was held in three phases, due to violence in the region.

Phase-wise polling constituencies in each state
State/Union territory	Total constituencies	Election dates and number of constituencies						
State/Union territory	Total constituencies	Phase 1	Phase 2	Phase 3	Phase 4	Phase 5	Phase 6	Phase 7
State/Union territory	Total constituencies	11 April	18 April	23 April	29 April	6 May	12 May	19 May
Andhra Pradesh	25	25						
Arunachal Pradesh	2	2						
Assam	14	5	5	4				
Bihar	40	4	5	5	5	5	8	8
Chhattisgarh	11	1	3	7				
Goa	2			2				
Gujarat	26			26				
Haryana	10						10	
Himachal Pradesh	4							4
Jammu and Kashmir	6	2	2	1/3 (Note: Polling in Anantnag was scheduled over three days.)	1/3	1 1/3		
Jharkhand	14				3	4	4	3
Karnataka	28		14	14				
Kerala	20			20				
Madhya Pradesh	29				6	7	8	8
Maharashtra	48	7	10	14	17			
Manipur	2	1	1					
Meghalaya	2	2						
Mizoram	1	1						
Nagaland	1	1						
Odisha	21	4	5	6	6			
Punjab	13							13
Rajasthan	25				13	12		
Sikkim	1	1						
Tamil Nadu	39		38 (Note: Polling in Vellore was cancelled, with the election later held on 5 August 2019. (see below))					
Telangana	17	17						
Tripura	2	1		1 (Note: Polling in Tripura East was rescheduled from 18 to 23 April.)				
Uttar Pradesh	80	8	8	10	13	14	14	13
Uttarakhand	5	5						
West Bengal	42	2	3	5	8	7	8	9
Andaman and Nicobar Islands	1	1						
Chandigarh	1							1
Dadra and Nagar Haveli	1			1				
Daman and Diu	1			1				
Delhi	7						7	
Lakshadweep	1	1						
Puducherry	1		1					
Constituencies	543	91	95	116 1/3	71 1/3	50 1/3	59	59
Total constituencies by end of phase	542	91	186	302 1/3	373 2/3	424	483	542
% complete by end of phase		17%	34%	56%	69%	78%	89%	100%
Result	543	23 May 2019						

=== Rescheduled voting, cancellations ===
- Vellore, Tamil Nadu: Over ₹11 crore (US$1.2 million) in cash was seized in Vellore from DMK leaders – a regional party in Tamil Nadu. According to The News Minute, this cash is alleged to have been for bribing the voters. Based on the evidence collected during the raids, the Election Commission of India cancelled the 18 April election date in the Vellore constituency. The DMK leaders denied wrongdoing and alleged a conspiracy.
- Tripura East, Tripura: The Election Commission of India deferred polling from 18 to 23 April due to the law and order situation. The poll panel took the decision following reports from the Special Police Observers that the circumstances were not conducive for holding free and fair elections in the constituency.

== Campaign ==
=== Issues ===
==== Allegations of undermining institutions ====
The opposition parties accused the NDA government of destroying democratic institutions and processes. Modi denied these allegations, and blamed Congress and the communists for undermining institutions including the police, the CBI, and the CAG, and cited the murder of BJP activists in Kerala and Madhya Pradesh. The Congress party, along with other opposition parties and a group of retired civil servants, accused the ECI of being compromised, and implied that they endorsed the model code of conduct violations by Narendra Modi and other BJP political leaders during their campaigns. Another group of 81 retired civil servants, judges and academics disputed these allegations, made counter-allegations, and stated that the ECI acted fairly and similarly in alleged violations by either side. The group stated that such political attacks on the ECI were a "deliberate attempt to denigrate and delegitimise the democratic institutions".

==== Economic performance ====
According to The Times of India, the major economic achievements of the incumbent NDA government included an inflation rate less than 4 per cent, the GST reform, and the Insolvency and Bankruptcy Code. Its programs, in recent years, that have positively touched many among the Indian masses, include the Jan Dhan Yojana, rural cooking gas and electricity for homes. According to the IMF, the Indian economy has been growing in recent years, its GDP growth rate is among the highest in the world for major economies, and India is expected to be the fastest growing major economy in 2019–2020 and 2020–2021, with real GDP projected to grow at 7.3 per cent. The GDP growth data has been disputed by a group of Indian social scientists, economists and the political opposition's election campaign, while a group of Indian chartered accountants has defended the data, the GDP calculation methodology, and questioned the motivations of those disputing the recent Indian GDP statistics.

The opposition's election campaign has claimed that both the demonetisation and GST law have "seriously hit small business, farmers and casual labour", states The Times of India. The incumbent has claimed that they inherited a country from the previous Congress-led government that was "a legacy of policy paralysis, corruption and economic fragility", and that the BJP-led government policies have placed India on better economic fundamentals and a fast gear. Modi claims that his government pursued demonetisation in the national interest, his government has identified and de-registered 338,000 shell companies, identified and recovered ₹130,000 crore (US$14 billion) in black money since 2014, and almost doubled India's tax base. The Congress party disputes the incumbents' claims, and has alleged that BJP offices have "become hubs of creating black money", and seeks a judicial inquiry into the Rafale deal with France and BJP's role in corruption.

==== National security and terrorism ====
In response to the 2019 Pulwama attack, the Indian Air Force conducted airstrikes inside Pakistan — for the first time since the 1971 Indo-Pakistani war. The ongoing conflict with Pakistan became a significant factor in the election. The opposition parties accused of politicising the army, whilst the BJP countered their accusations by stating that such allegations raised by them were adversely affecting the morale of armed forces.

According to the Pew Research Center, both before and after the outbreak of recent India-Pakistan tensions, their 2018 and 2019 surveys suggest that the significant majority of the voters consider Pakistan as a "very serious threat" to their country, and terrorism to be a "very big problem".

==== Unemployment ====
According to the Pew Research Center, a majority of Indian voters consider the lack of employment opportunities as a "very big problem" in their country. "About 18.6 million Indians were jobless and another 393.7 million work in poor-quality jobs vulnerable to displacement", stated the Pew report.

A report on unemployment prepared by the National Sample Survey Office's (NSSO's) periodic labour force survey, has not been officially released by the government. According to Business Today, this report is the "first comprehensive survey on employment conducted by a government agency after Prime Minister Narendra Modi announced demonetisation move in November 2016". According to this report, the 2017–2018 "usual status" (Note: The unemployment data in India is not collected on a monthly or an annual basis, rather it is determined through a sample survey once every 5 years, with a few exceptions. The survey methodology is unlike those in major world economies, and sub-classifies unemployment into categories such as "usual status unemployment" and "current status unemployment" based on the answers given by the individuals interviewed. Its methodology and results have been questioned by various scholars. The report and the refusal of the BJP government to release it has been criticised by economist Surjit Bhalla. According to Bhalla, the survey methodology is flawed and its results absurd, because the sample survey-based report finds that India's overall population has declined since 2011–12 by 1.2 per cent (contrary to the Census data which states a 6.7 per cent increase). The report finds that India's per cent urbanisation and urban workforce has declined since 2012, which is contrary to all other studies on Indian urbanisation trends, states Bhalla. According to NSSO's report's data, "the Modi government has unleashed the most inclusive growth anywhere, and at any time in human history" – which is as unbelievable as the unemployment data it reports, states Bhalla. The NSSO report suggests the inflation-adjusted employment income of casual workers has dramatically increased while those of the salaried wage-earners has fallen during the 5-years of BJP government. The NSSO has also changed the sampling methodology in the latest round, state Bhalla and Avik Sarkar, which is one of the likely sources of its flawed statistics and conclusions.) unemployment rate in India is 6.1 per cent, which is a four-decade high. The government has claimed that the report was not final. According to the International Labour Organization (ILO) – a United Nations agency, unemployment is rising in India and the "unemployment rate in the country [India] will stand at 3.5 percent in 2018 and 2019 – the same level of unemployment seen in 2017 and 2016", instead of dropping to 3.4 per cent as it had previously projected. According to the ILO's World Employment Social Outlook Report, the unemployment rate in India has been in the 3.4 to 3.6 per cent range over the UPA-government led 2009–2014 and the NDA-government led 2014–2019 periods.

Opposition parties claimed in their election campaign that the unemployment in India had reached crisis levels. The NDA government has denied the existence of any job crisis. Prime minister Narendra Modi claimed that jobs are not lacking but the accurate data on jobs has been lacking.

The opposition has attacked the NDA government's performance with the NSSO reported 6.1 per cent unemployment data. Modi and his government have questioned this job statistics report, stating that "most surveys that try to capture unemployment rate are skewed since these did not cover the unorganised sector, which accounts for 85–90 per cent of jobs [in India]".

==== Agrarian and rural distress ====
The Congress party campaign highlighted "agrarian distress" as an election issue. The BJP campaign highlighted that the Congress party had been in power for five generations of the Nehru dynasty and its past promises and campaign issues have been empty. It claimed that the recent farmer loan waivers by Congress have not reached "even 10% of the farmers" nor has it helped the financial situation of the farmers. BJP highlights that its "Kisan Samman Nidhi" helps the small farmers at the time of seed planting through a direct deposit of ₹6000 to their accounts. The opposition accused this as being an attempt to lure voters.

According to The Times of India, a group of farmer associations demanded that the 2019 election manifesto of competing political parties should promise to "keep agriculture out of the World Trade Organization (WTO)" and that the interests of Indian farmers must not be compromised in global trade treaties. They also demanded loan waivers and income support for the agriculture sector. According to the Business Standard and the United Nations' Food and Agriculture Organization, India has witnessed record crop harvests in recent years including 2017 when its farmers grew more foodgrains than ever before. However, the farmers consider the "low remunerative prices" they receive in the free market to be too low and a need for the Indian government to establish higher minimum support prices for agricultural products. These farmers consider this an issue for the 2019 general elections.

==== Dynasty politics ====
The BJP highlighted that the Congress party has relied on Rahul Gandhi for leadership since 2013, its lack of internal party institutions and claimed that whenever Congress has been in power, the freedom of press and Indian government institutions have "taken a severe beating". During the election campaign, its leaders mentioned the Emergency of 1975, the nepotism, corruption and widespread abuses of human rights under the Congress rule in the past. Congress-led alliance leader H. D. Kumaraswamy – the son of a former prime minister of India and the former chief minister of Karnataka, countered that "India developed because of dynasty politics", stating that "dynasty politics are not the main issue, rather country's problems are". The Congress alleged hypocrisy by the BJP, claiming that the BJP itself forms alliances with dynasty-based parties such as the Akali Dal in Punjab, and that family relatives of senior BJP leaders such as Rajnath Singh and Arun Jaitley have been in politics too.

According to an IndiaSpend report published by the BloombergQuint, the smaller and regional parties such as the Jammu and Kashmir National Conference, Lok Jan Sakti Party, Shiromani Akali Dal, Biju Janata Dal and Samajwadi Party have higher densities of dynasty-derived candidates and elected representatives in recent years. While both the Congress and the BJP have also nominated candidates from political dynasties, states the report, the difference between them is that in Congress "top party leadership has been handed down from generation to generation within the same [Nehru Gandhi dynasty] family", while there has been a historic non-dynastic diversity in the top leadership within the BJP. According to the report, while BJP has also nominated candidates from political dynasties, its better public relations operation "can leap to its defence when attacked on the same grounds". In contrast to the IndiaSpend report, analysis of Kanchan Chandra, a prominent professor of Politics, of the 2004, 2009 and 2014 general elections included a finding that the Congress party has had about twice or more dynastic parliamentarians than the BJP at those elections, and higher than all major political parties in India except the Samajwadi Party. (Note: According to Chandra: in 2009 after the persistently dynastic Samajwadi party, the larger Biju Janata Dal ranked next, followed by the Congress party. In 2004 and 2014, Congress ranked second.) Many of these dynastic politicians in India who inherit the leadership positions have never held any jobs and lack state or local experience, states Anjali Bohlken – a professor and political science scholar, and this raises concerns of rampant nepotism and appointments of their own friends, relatives and cronies if elected. The BJP targeted the Congress party in the 2019 elections for alleged nepotism and a family dynasty for leadership.

=== Campaign controversies ===
==== Income tax raids ====
In April 2019, raids conducted by the Income Tax Department found bundles of unaccounted for cash amounting to ₹281 crore (US$30 million), along with liquor and documentary evidence in premises of people with close connections to Madhya Pradesh chief minister Kamal Nath of the Congress. Modi has highlighted this evidence to attack the Congress in its election campaign, alleging corruption is part of Congress party's culture.

==== Social media abuses and fake news ====
According to The New York Times and The Wall Street Journal, the election attracted a systematic attempt to spread misinformation through social media. Facebook said that over a hundred of these advocacy accounts spreading disinformation were traced to "employees of the Pakistani military public relations wing". Some others have been linked to the INC and BJP.

Political parties spent over ₹53 crore (US$5.7 million) with the largest spending by BJP on digital platforms for online ads. The BJP placed 2,500 ads on Facebook while the Congress placed 3,686 ads. According to a study by Vidya Narayanan and colleagues at the Oxford Internet Institute, social media was used by all the major parties and alliances, and all of them linked or posted divisive and conspiratorial content and images. According to Narayanan, "a third of the BJP's images, a quarter of the INC's images, and a tenth the SP-BSP's images were catalogued as divisive and conspiratorial". The Narayanan et al. study added that "we observed very limited amounts of hate speech, gore or pornography in either platform samples" by BJP, Congress or SP-BSP, but the election did include proportionally more polarising information on social media than other countries except for the US presidential election in 2016.

About 50,000 fake news stories were published during the recent Lok Sabha elections and shared 2 million times, according to a study conducted by fact-checking startup Logically.

In September 2019, the BBC launched the Trusted News Initiative to help combat election-related disinformation, citing the 2019 general elections as a motivating factor.

==== ECI actions under Article 324 ====
The Election Commission of India (ECI) curtailed West Bengal's campaigning by one day, after a bust of 19th century Bengali icon Ishwar Chandra Vidyasagar was vandalised due to violence in the 7th phase of the election.

=== Party campaigns ===
- 12 January 2019 – Prime Minister Modi launched the BJP's election campaign.
- 14 February 2019 – The INC president Rahul Gandhi launched his campaign from Lal Dungri village in Gujarat's Dharampur.
- 24 March 2019 – The Aam Aadmi Party began its campaign in Delhi.
- 2 April 2019 – The Trinamool Congress party launched its campaign from Dinhata, Coochbehar.
- 7 April 2019 – Bahujan Samaj Party and Samajwadi Party began campaigning together as an alliance (Mahagathbandhan) along with regional parties such as the Rashtriya Lok Dal. Their first joint campaign started in Deoband in Saharanpur district of Uttar Pradesh.

=== Party manifestos ===
==== Highlights of the Congress manifesto ====
The Congress released its manifesto, titled Congress Will Deliver on 3 April. Some of its highlights:

- Introduce a Nyuntam Aay Yojana welfare program wherein ₹72,000 (US$770) per year will be transferred directly to the bank account of a woman-member in each family in the poorest 20 per cent households.
- Create 1 million "Seva Mitra" jobs in rural and urban local government bodies. Fill all 400,000 central government vacancies before March 2020, and encourage state governments to fill their 2,000,000 vacancies. Enact a law that requires all non-government controlled employers with over 100 employees to implement an apprentice program.
- Enact a permanent National Commission on Agricultural Development and Planning and introduce a "Kisan Budget" (Farmer Budget) in the parliament every year. Waive all farmer loans in all states with any amounts outstanding.
- Enact a Right to Homestead Act that will provide free land to every household that does not own a home.
- Enact a Right to Healthcare Act and guarantee every citizen free diagnostics, free medicines, free hospitalisation, and free out-patient care. Double spending on healthcare to 3 per cent of its GDP by 2024.
- Double spending on education to 6 per cent of its GDP by 2024.
- Revise the national GST law from three tax tiers to a single moderate rate of tax. Reduce taxes on exported products to zero. Exempt from the GST essential goods and services that are currently not exempt. Enact a new Direct Taxes Code.
- Augment and rapid construction of national highways. Modernise Indian railway infrastructure. Promote green energy. Manufacturing promotion.
- Increase defence spending.
- Enact a National Election Fund, wherein public funds will be distributed to recognised political parties to run their campaign
- Preserve special status and special rights to natives of Jammu and Kashmir under Article 370 and 35A.
- Amend the Armed Forces (Special Powers) Act, 1958. End the Sedition law (Section 124A of the Indian Penal Code).

==== Highlights of the BJP manifesto ====
The BJP released its manifesto sub-titled Sankalpit Bharat, Sashakt Bharat (lit. 'Resolute India, Empowered India') on 8 April. Some of its highlights:

- Implementation of a nationwide National Register of Citizens (NRC) to identify & deport undocumented immigrants, an immigrant being defined in this context as a person who is unable to provide documentary evidence of his/her residency in India prior to 26 March 1971 or that of his/her immediate ancestors (parents & grandparents) in case of being born after the previously mentioned date, preceded by an amendment in citizenship laws that will allow only undocumented Hindu, Sikh, Buddhist, Jain, Parsi, and Christian immigrants from Pakistan, Bangladesh, and Afghanistan who entered India before 31 December 2014 to automatically obtain Indian citizenship.
- End the special autonomous status of Jammu and Kashmir and the special rights granted to its citizens as per Article 370 of the Indian constitution.
- Double farmer incomes by 2022 via the completion of major and micro-irrigation infrastructure projects, open adequate markets and modern farm produce storage centres, implement minimum price supports for farmer produce, farmer loans, and construct of all-weather rural roads. Introduce a pension bill for small and marginal farmers to provide social security after 60 years of age.
- Bring all secondary schools under the national board quality purview. Invest ₹100,000 crore (US$11 billion) in higher education, open new and increase seats at existing engineering, management and law schools. Establish skills and innovations centre at block-level in every town. Enhance higher education opportunities for women by introducing financial support and subsidies programs. Source 10 per cent of government procurement from companies with more than 50 per cent female employees.
- Ensure a pucca (lit. 'Solid' or 'Durable') house, with safe potable water, toilet, LPG gas cylinder, electricity, and banking account for every family in the country. Reduce the percentage of families living under the poverty line to a single digit by 2024.
- Double the length of national highways. Improve fuel quality by mandating 10 per cent ethanol in petrol. Scale renewable energy capacity to 175 GW.
- Electrify and convert to broad gauge all railway tracks.
- Establish 150,000 health and wellness centres. Start 75 new medical colleges. Raise doctor-to-population ratio to 1:1400. Triple childcare facilities. Achieve 100 per cent immunisation of all babies.
- Raise India's ranking further in "ease of doing business". Double exports, introduce single-window compliance procedures for all businesses.
- Reduce air pollution by eliminating all crop residue burning.
- Digitise paperwork and proceedings, modernise the courts.
- Launch and promote a National Digital Library with e-books and leading journals to provide free knowledge accessible to all students. Launch a "Study in India" program to bring foreign students to institutes of higher education.
- Privatisation of defence, space and agriculture sector for development of India.
- Zero tolerance for terrorism, fund resources to strengthen national security, guarantee veterans and soldier welfare, modernise police forces.

==== Other parties ====
Other national and regional parties released their manifestos too:

- The Tamil Nadu-based regional parties AIADMK and DMK released their manifesto on 18 March 2019, with each promising to release the seven Tamils jailed after being found guilty for their role in the assassination of Rajiv Gandhi, a former Congress party leader and prime minister of India. The AIADMK promised to press for the political rights of the Tamil people in the Eelam region of Sri Lanka, while the DMK has promised Indian citizenship to all Sri Lankan expats. According to the Deccan Herald, the AIADMK has promised a cash transfer of ₹18,000 (US$190) per year to "all families below the poverty level, destitute women, widows without income, differently-abled, landless agricultural labourers, rural and urban manual labourers and destitute senior citizens". The AIADMK also promised to raise the tax exemption limit and revisions to the GST law. The DMK promised a probe into Rafale fighter jet deal, and a plan to distribute free sanitary napkins to working women along with starting martial arts schools for girls.
- Biju Janata Dal (BJD) released its manifesto on 9 April 2019. It promised a ₹100,000 (US$1,100) zero-interest crop loan to farmers every year, a ₹500,000 (US$5,300) zero-interest loan to women-run self-help groups, 75 per cent jobs reservation in Odisha-based companies to Odisha youth, free education to all girls and a marriage assistance grant of ₹25,000 (US$270) to daughters of poor families. It also promised to complete two expressways.
- Communist Party of India (Marxist) (CPIM) manifesto promised to raise the minimum wage to ₹216,000 (US$2,300) per year, an old age pension of ₹72,000 (US$770) per year and universal public distribution of 35 kilograms of foodgrains per family. It also stated the restoration of inheritance tax and an increase in the taxes on individuals and corporations. It also promised spending 6 per cent of GDP on education, enacting a Right to Free Health Care with 3.5 per cent of GDP on health in the short term and 5 per cent in the long term, introduction of price controls on essential drugs, breaking monopoly of drug multinationals, as well as enact a Right to Guaranteed Employment in urban areas.
- Nationalist Congress Party (NCP) promised to open talks with Pakistan on terrorism. It also promised to expand trade and political relationship with Russia, and seek to weaken Russia's ties with China and Pakistan.
- Samajwadi Party promised an annual pension of ₹36,000 (US$380) to poor families in a form of a cash transfer to women. It has also proposed a new property tax of 2 per cent on homes valued above ₹25,000,000 (US$270,000) as well as raising income taxes on the affluent. It also promised to create 100,000 new jobs every year. The SP manifesto also called for the establishment of an Ahir regiment within the Indian Army.
- Telugu Desam Party released its manifesto on 5 April 2019. It promised zero-interest loans to farmer without any caps, a grant of ₹15,000 (US$160) per year to each farmer as investment support, a grant of ₹100,000 (US$1,100) to each family with a daughter in the year of her marriage, an unemployment allowance of ₹3,000 (US$32) for any youth who has completed intermediate education, and free laptops to all students at the intermediate level.
- AITMC's manifesto was released on 27 March 2019. It promised a judicial probe into demonetisation, a review of GST law, and sought to bring back the Planning Commission. It also promised free medical care, expanding the "100-day work scheme" currently operating in India to "200-day work scheme" along with a pay increase.
- Aam Aadmi Party released its manifesto on 25 April 2019 promising full statehood for Delhi to give the Delhi government control over police and other institutions. The manifesto promised 85 per cent reservations in the Delhi-based colleges and jobs for the voters of Delhi and their families.

=== Campaign finance ===
Several organisations offered varying estimates for the cost of the election campaign. The Centre for Media Studies in New Delhi estimated that the election campaign could exceed $7 billion. According to the Association for Democratic Reforms (ADR), an election watchdog, in the financial year 2017–18 BJP received ₹4,370,000,000 (US$47 million), about 12 times more donations than Congress and five other national parties combined.

The electoral bonds in denominations ranging from 1,000 rupees to 10 million rupees ($14 to $140,000) can be purchased and donated to a political party. The bonds don't carry the name of the donor and are exempt from tax. (Note: Stanley Kochanek in 1987 published about the "briefcase politics" tradition in Indian politics during the decades when the Congress party dominated Indian national politics. Similarly, Rajeev Gowda and E Sridharan in 2012 have discussed the history of campaign financing laws in India and the role of black money in Indian elections. Devesh Kapur and Milan Vaishnav discuss the rise of "briefcase" black money donations in India triggered by the 1969 campaign financing bans proposed and enacted by Indira Gandhi, and the campaign finance law reforms thereafter through 2017. They call the recent reforms as yielding "greater transparency than ever before, though limited".) Factly – an India data journalism portal, traced the electoral bond donations for 2018 under India's Right to Information Act. According to Factly, electoral bonds worth about ₹10,600,000,000 (US$110 million) were purchased and donated in 2018. According to Bloomberg, this accounted for 31.2 per cent of political donations in 2018, while 51.4 per cent of the total donated amount were each below ₹20,000 (US$210) and these too were from unknown donors. About 47 per cent of the donations to political parties were from known sources. Between 1 January and 31 March 2019, donors bought ₹17,100,000,000 (US$180 million) worth of electoral bonds and donated. The spending in elections boosts national GDP, and the 2009 election spending contributed about 0.5 per cent to GDP.

According to the Centre for Media Studies, the BJP spent over ₹280 billion (or 45%) of the ₹600 billion spent by all political parties during the polls. Congress questioned the BJP over its poll expenditure.

== Parties and alliances ==
=== Political alliances ===
With the exception of 2014, no single party has won the majority of seats in the Lok Sabha since 1984, and therefore, forming alliances is the norm in Indian elections.

There were three main national pre-poll alliances. They are the National Democratic Alliance (NDA) headed by the BJP, the United Progressive Alliance (UPA) headed by the INC and the Left Front of the communist leaning parties.

The INC did not form alliances in states where it was in direct contest with the BJP. These states included Himachal Pradesh, Uttarakhand, Rajasthan, Gujarat, Madhya Pradesh, and Chhattisgarh. It formed alliances with regional parties in Jammu and Kashmir, Bihar, Tamil Nadu, Maharashtra, Karnataka, Jharkhand, and Kerala.

The left parties, most notably the Communist Party of India (Marxist) contested on its own in its strongholds West Bengal, Tripura and Kerala, confronting both NDA and UPA. In Tamil Nadu, it was part of the Secular Progressive Alliance led by DMK while it was allied with the Jana Sena Party in Andhra Pradesh.

In January 2019, Bahujan Samaj Party and Samajwadi Party announced a grand alliance (Mahagathbandhan) to contest 76 out of the 80 seats in Uttar Pradesh leaving two seats, namely Amethi and Rae Bareli, for INC and another two for other political parties.

=== Political parties ===
More than 650 parties contested in these elections. Most of them were small with regional appeal. The main parties were the Bharatiya Janata Party (BJP), the Indian National Congress (INC) and the Communist Party of India (Marxist) (CPI(M)). This was the first time that BJP (437) contested more seats than Congress (421) in the Lok Sabha elections.

== Candidates ==
Altogether 8,039 candidates were in the fray for 542 parliamentary constituencies, i.e., 14.8 candidates per constituency on an average, according to PRS India, an NGO.

About 40% of the candidates fielded by the Bharatiya Janata Party had a criminal case against them. The key opposition party Indian National Congress was not far behind with 39% of the candidates having criminal charges while the proportion exceeded 50% for some political parties, according to the Association of Democratic Reforms analysis.

Parties and alliances contesting for the 2019 elections
Parties	States/UTs	Seats contested				Seats won			
Parties	States/UTs	2019		2014	Swing	2019		2014	Swing
Aam Aadmi Party	Andaman & Nicobar Islands	1	35			0	1	4	-3
Aam Aadmi Party	Bihar	3	35			0	1	4	-3
Aam Aadmi Party	Chandigarh	1	35			0	1	4	-3
Aam Aadmi Party	Goa	2	35			0	1	4	-3
Aam Aadmi Party	Haryana	3	35			0	1	4	-3
Aam Aadmi Party	NCT OF Delhi	7	35			0	1	4	-3
Aam Aadmi Party	Odisha	1	35			0	1	4	-3
Aam Aadmi Party	Punjab	13	35			1	1	4	-3
Aam Aadmi Party	Uttar Pradesh	4	35			0	1	4	-3
All Jharkhand Students Union (AJSU)	Jharkhand	1				1		0	+1
All India Anna Dravida Munnetra Kazhagam	Tamil Nadu	22				1		37	-36
All India Majlis-E-Ittehadul Muslimeen	Bihar	1	3			0	2	1	+1
All India Majlis-E-Ittehadul Muslimeen	Maharashtra	1	3			1	2	1	+1
All India Majlis-E-Ittehadul Muslimeen	Telangana	1				1	2	1	+1
All India Trinamool Congress	Andaman & Nicobar Islands	1	62			0	22	34	-12
All India Trinamool Congress	Assam	8	62			0	22	34	-12
All India Trinamool Congress	Bihar	1	62			0	22	34	-12
All India Trinamool Congress	Jharkhand	6	62			0	22	34	-12
All India Trinamool Congress	Odisha	3	62			0	22	34	-12
All India Trinamool Congress	Tripura	1	62			0	22	34	-12
All India Trinamool Congress	West Bengal	42	62			22	22	34	-12
All India United Democratic Front	Assam	3				1		3	-2
Apna Dal (Soneylal)	Uttar Pradesh	2				2		0	+2
Bahujan Samaj Party	Andaman & Nicobar Islands	1				0	10	0	+10
Bahujan Samaj Party	Andhra Pradesh	3				0	10	0	+10
Bahujan Samaj Party	Arunachal Pradesh	0				0	10	0	+10
Bahujan Samaj Party	Assam						10	0	+10
Bahujan Samaj Party	Bihar	35				0	10	0	+10
Bahujan Samaj Party	Chandigarh	1				0	10	0	+10
Bahujan Samaj Party	Chhattisgarh	11				0	10	0	+10
Bahujan Samaj Party	Dadra & Nagar Haveli	1				0	10	0	+10
Bahujan Samaj Party	Daman & Diu	1				0	10	0	+10
Bahujan Samaj Party	Goa						10	0	+10
Bahujan Samaj Party	Gujarat	25				0	10	0	+10
Bahujan Samaj Party	Haryana	8				0	10	0	+10
Bahujan Samaj Party	Himachal Pradesh	4				0	10	0	+10
Bahujan Samaj Party	Jammu & Kashmir	2				0	10	0	+10
Bahujan Samaj Party	Jharkhand	14				0	10	0	+10
Bahujan Samaj Party	Karnataka	28				0	10	0	+10
Bahujan Samaj Party	Kerala	16				0	10	0	+10
Bahujan Samaj Party	Lakshadweep						10	0	+10
Bahujan Samaj Party	Madhya Pradesh	25				0	10	0	+10
Bahujan Samaj Party	Maharashtra	44				0	10	0	+10
Bahujan Samaj Party	Manipur						10	0	+10
Bahujan Samaj Party	Meghalaya						10	0	+10
Bahujan Samaj Party	Mizoram						10	0	+10
Bahujan Samaj Party	Nagaland-						10	0	+10
Bahujan Samaj Party	NCT OF Delhi	5				0	10	0	+10
Bahujan Samaj Party	Odisha	17				0	10	0	+10
Bahujan Samaj Party	Puducherry	1				0	10	0	+10
Bahujan Samaj Party	Punjab	1				0	10	0	+10
Bahujan Samaj Party	Rajasthan	22				0	10	0	+10
Bahujan Samaj Party	Sikkim						10	0	+10
Bahujan Samaj Party	Tamil Nadu	35				0	10	0	+10
Bahujan Samaj Party	Telangana	5				0	10	0	+10
Bahujan Samaj Party	Tripura						10	0	+10
Bahujan Samaj Party	Uttar Pradesh	38				10	10	0	+10
Bahujan Samaj Party	Uttarakhand	4				0	10	0	+10
Bahujan Samaj Party	West Bengal	36				0	10	0	+10
Bharatiya Janata Party	Andaman & Nicobar Islands	1	436			0	303	282	+21
Bharatiya Janata Party	Andhra Pradesh	25	436			0	303	282	+21
Bharatiya Janata Party	Arunachal Pradesh	2	436			2	303	282	+21
Bharatiya Janata Party	Assam	10	436			9	303	282	+21
Bharatiya Janata Party	Bihar	17	436			17	303	282	+21
Bharatiya Janata Party	Chandigarh	1	436			1	303	282	+21
Bharatiya Janata Party	Chhattisgarh	11	436			9	303	282	+21
Bharatiya Janata Party	Dadra & Nagar Haveli	1	436			0	303	282	+21
Bharatiya Janata Party	Daman & Diu	1	436			1	303	282	+21
Bharatiya Janata Party	Goa	2	436			1	303	282	+21
Bharatiya Janata Party	Gujarat	26	436			26	303	282	+21
Bharatiya Janata Party	Haryana	10	436			10	303	282	+21
Bharatiya Janata Party	Himachal Pradesh	4	436			4	303	282	+21
Bharatiya Janata Party	Jammu & Kashmir	6	436			3	303	282	+21
Bharatiya Janata Party	Jharkhand	13	436			11	303	282	+21
Bharatiya Janata Party	Karnataka	27	436			25	303	282	+21
Bharatiya Janata Party	Kerala	15	436			0	303	282	+21
Bharatiya Janata Party	Lakshadweep	1	436			0	303	282	+21
Bharatiya Janata Party	Madhya Pradesh	29	436			28	303	282	+21
Bharatiya Janata Party	Maharashtra	25	436			23	303	282	+21
Bharatiya Janata Party	Manipur	2	436			1	303	282	+21
Bharatiya Janata Party	Meghalaya	2	436			0	303	282	+21
Bharatiya Janata Party	Mizoram	1	436			0	303	282	+21
Bharatiya Janata Party	Nagaland-		436				303	282	+21
Bharatiya Janata Party	NCT OF Delhi	7	436			10	303	282	+21
Bharatiya Janata Party	Odisha	21	436			8	303	282	+21
Bharatiya Janata Party	Puducherry		436				303	282	+21
Bharatiya Janata Party	Punjab	3	436			2	303	282	+21
Bharatiya Janata Party	Rajasthan	24	436			24	303	282	+21
Bharatiya Janata Party	Sikkim	1	436			0	303	282	+21
Bharatiya Janata Party	Tamil Nadu	5	436			0	303	282	+21
Bharatiya Janata Party	Telangana	17	436			4	303	282	+21
Bharatiya Janata Party	Tripura	2	436			2	303	282	+21
Bharatiya Janata Party	Uttar Pradesh	76	436			62	303	282	+21
Bharatiya Janata Party	Uttarakhand	5	436			5	303	282	+21
Bharatiya Janata Party	West Bengal	42	436			18	303	282	+21
Biju Janata Dal	Odisha	21				12		20	-8
Communist Party Of India	Andhra Pradesh	2	49			0	2	1	+1
Communist Party Of India	Assam	2	49			0	2	1	+1
Communist Party Of India	Bihar	2	49			0	2	1	+1
Communist Party Of India	Chhattisgarh	1	49			0	2	1	+1
Communist Party Of India	Gujarat	1	49			0	2	1	+1
Communist Party Of India	Haryana	1	49			0	2	1	+1
Communist Party Of India	Jharkhand	3	49			0	2	1	+1
Communist Party Of India	Karnataka	1	49			0	2	1	+1
Communist Party Of India	Kerala	4	49			0	2	1	+1
Communist Party Of India	Lakshadweep	1	49			0	2	1	+1
Communist Party Of India	Madhya Pradesh	4	49			0	2	1	+1
Communist Party Of India	Maharashtra	2	49			0	2	1	+1
Communist Party Of India	Manipur	1	49			0	2	1	+1
Communist Party Of India	Odisha	1	49			0	2	1	+1
Communist Party Of India	Punjab	2	49			0	2	1	+1
Communist Party Of India	Rajasthan	3	49			0	2	1	+1
Communist Party Of India	Tamil Nadu	2	49			2	2	1	+1
Communist Party Of India	Telangana	2	49			0	2	1	+1
Communist Party Of India	Uttar Pradesh	11	49			0	2	1	+1
Communist Party Of India	West Bengal	3	49				2	1	+1
Communist Party Of India (MARXIST)	Andhra Pradesh	2	69			0	3	9	-6
Communist Party Of India (MARXIST)	Assam	2	69			0	3	9	-6
Communist Party Of India (MARXIST)	Bihar	1	69			0	3	9	-6
Communist Party Of India (MARXIST)	Himachal Pradesh	1	69			0	3	9	-6
Communist Party Of India (MARXIST)	Jharkhand	2	69			0	3	9	-6
Communist Party Of India (MARXIST)	Karnataka	1	69			0	3	9	-6
Communist Party Of India (MARXIST)	Kerala	14	69			1	3	9	-6
Communist Party Of India (MARXIST)	Lakshadweep	1	69			0	3	9	-6
Communist Party Of India (MARXIST)	Madhya Pradesh	1	69			0	3	9	-6
Communist Party Of India (MARXIST)	Maharashtra	1	69			0	3	9	-6
Communist Party Of India (MARXIST)	Odisha	1	69			0	3	9	-6
Communist Party Of India (MARXIST)	Punjab	1	69			0	3	9	-6
Communist Party Of India (MARXIST)	Rajasthan	3	69			0	3	9	-6
Communist Party Of India (MARXIST)	Tamil Nadu	2	69			2	3	9	-6
Communist Party Of India (MARXIST)	Telangana	2	69			0	3	9	-6
Communist Party Of India (MARXIST)	Tripura	2	69			0	3	9	-6
Communist Party Of India (MARXIST)	Uttarakhand	1	69				3	9	-6
Communist Party Of India (MARXIST)	West Bengal	31	69				3	9	-6
Dravida Munnetra Kazhagam	Tamil Nadu	24				24		0	+24
Independent	Andaman & Nicobar Islands	9	3443			0	4	3	+1
Independent	Andhra Pradesh	99	3443			0	4	3	+1
Independent	Arunachal Pradesh	2	3443			0	4	3	+1
Independent	Assam	44	3443			1	4	3	+1
Independent	Bihar	230	3443			0	4	3	+1
Independent	Chandigarh	13	3443			0	4	3	+1
Independent	Chhattisgarh	54	3443			0	4	3	+1
Independent	Dadra & Nagar Haveli	4	3443			1	4	3	+1
Independent	Daman & Diu	1	3443			0	4	3	+1
Independent	Goa	4	3443			0	4	3	+1
Independent	Gujarat	197	3443			0	4	3	+1
Independent	Haryana	85	3443			0	4	3	+1
Independent	Himachal Pradesh	18	3443			0	4	3	+1
Independent	Jammu & Kashmir	36	3443			0	4	3	+1
Independent	Jharkhand	101	3443			0	4	3	+1
Independent	Karnataka	264	3443			1	4	3	+1
Independent	Kerala	115	3443			0	4	3	+1
Independent	Lakshadweep	0	3443			0	4	3	+1
Independent	Madhya Pradesh	175	3443			0	4	3	+1
Independent	Maharashtra	418	3443			1	4	3	+1
Independent	Manipur	5	3443			0	4	3	+1
Independent	Meghalaya	3	3443			0	4	3	+1
Independent	Mizoram	3	3443			0	4	3	+1
Independent	Nagaland-	1	3443			0	4	3	+1
Independent	NCT OF Delhi	43	3443			0	4	3	+1
Independent	Odisha	31	3443			0	4	3	+1
Independent	Puducherry	8	3443			0	4	3	+1
Independent	Punjab	45	3443			0	4	3	+1
Independent	Rajasthan	111	3443			0	4	3	+1
Independent	Sikkim	2	3443			0	4	3	+1
Independent	Tamil Nadu	542	3443			0	4	3	+1
Independent	Telangana	299	3443			0	4	3	+1
Independent	Tripura	9	3443			0	4	3	+1
Independent	Uttar Pradesh	284	3443			0	4	3	+1
Independent	Uttarakhand	17	3443			0	4	3	+1
Independent	West Bengal	100	3443			0	4	3	+1
Indian National Congress	Andaman & Nicobar Islands	1	421			1	52	44	+8
Indian National Congress	Andhra Pradesh	25	421			0	52	44	+8
Indian National Congress	Arunachal Pradesh	2	421			0	52	44	+8
Indian National Congress	Assam	14	421			3	52	44	+8
Indian National Congress	Bihar	9	421			1	52	44	+8
Indian National Congress	Chandigarh	1	421			0	52	44	+8
Indian National Congress	Chhattisgarh	11	421			2	52	44	+8
Indian National Congress	Dadra & Nagar Haveli	1	421			0	52	44	+8
Indian National Congress	Daman & Diu	1	421			0	52	44	+8
Indian National Congress	Goa	2	421			1	52	44	+8
Indian National Congress	Gujarat	26	421			0	52	44	+8
Indian National Congress	Haryana	10	421			0	52	44	+8
Indian National Congress	Himachal Pradesh	4	421			0	52	44	+8
Indian National Congress	Jammu & Kashmir	5	421			0	52	44	+8
Indian National Congress	Jharkhand	7	421			1	52	44	+8
Indian National Congress	Karnataka	21	421			1	52	44	+8
Indian National Congress	Kerala	16	421			15	52	44	+8
Indian National Congress	Lakshadweep	1	421			0	52	44	+8
Indian National Congress	Madhya Pradesh	29	421			1	52	44	+8
Indian National Congress	Maharashtra	25	421			1	52	44	+8
Indian National Congress	Manipur	2	421			0	52	44	+8
Indian National Congress	Meghalaya	2	421			1	52	44	+8
Indian National Congress	Mizoram		421				52	44	+8
Indian National Congress	Nagaland-	1	421			0	52	44	+8
Indian National Congress	NCT OF Delhi	7	421			0	52	44	+8
Indian National Congress	Odisha	18	421			1	52	44	+8
Indian National Congress	Puducherry	1	421			1	52	44	+8
Indian National Congress	Punjab	13	421			8	52	44	+8
Indian National Congress	Rajasthan	25	421			0	52	44	+8
Indian National Congress	Sikkim	1	421			0	52	44	+8
Indian National Congress	Tamil Nadu	9	421			8	52	44	+8
Indian National Congress	Telangana	17	421			3	52	44	+8
Indian National Congress	Tripura	2	421			0	52	44	+8
Indian National Congress	Uttar Pradesh	67	421			1	52	44	+8
Indian National Congress	Uttarakhand	5	421			0	52	44	+8
Indian National Congress	West Bengal	40	421			2	52	44	+8
Indian Union Muslim League	Andhra Pradesh	3	9			0	3	2	+1
Indian Union Muslim League	Kerala	2	9			2	3	2	+1
Indian Union Muslim League	Maharashtra	3	9			0	3	2	+1
Indian Union Muslim League	Tamil Nadu	1	9			1	3	2	+1
Jammu & Kashmir National Conference (NC)	Jammu & Kashmir	3					3	0	+3
Janata Dal (Secular)	Arunachal Pradesh	2	9			0	1	2	-1
Janata Dal (Secular)	Karnataka	7	9			1	1	2	-1
Janata Dal (United)	Bihar	17	25			16	16	2	+14
Janata Dal (United)	Jammu & Kashmir	1	25			0	16	2	+14
Janata Dal (United)	Lakshadweep	1	25			0	16	2	+14
Janata Dal (United)	Madhya Pradesh	1	25			0	16	2	+14
Janata Dal (United)	Manipur	1	25			0	16	2	+14
Janata Dal (United)	Punjab	1	25				16	2	+14
Janata Dal (United)	Uttar Pradesh	3	25			0	16	2	+14
Jharkhand Mukti Morcha	Bihar	4	13			0	1	2	-1
Jharkhand Mukti Morcha	Jharkhand	4	13			1	1	2	-1
Jharkhand Mukti Morcha	Odisha	1	13			0	1	2	-1
Jharkhand Mukti Morcha	West Bengal	4	13			0	1	2	-1
Kerala Congress(M)	Kerala	1				1		1	0
Lok Janshakti Party	Bihar	6				6		6	0
Mizo National Front (MNF)	Meghalaya	1				1		0	+1
Naga People's Front	Manipur	1				1		0	+1
National People's Party	Arunachal Pradesh	1	11			0	1	1	0
National People's Party	Assam	7	11			0	1	1	0
National People's Party	Manipur	1	11			0	1	1	0
National People's Party	Meghalaya	1	11			1	1	1	0
National People's Party	Nagaland	1	11			0	1	1	0
Nationalist Congress Party	Assam	2	34			0	5	6	-1
Nationalist Congress Party	Bihar	5	34			0	5	6	-1
Nationalist Congress Party	Gujarat	3	34			0	5	6	-1
Nationalist Congress Party	Lakshadweep	1	34			1	5	6	-1
Nationalist Congress Party	Maharashtra	19	34			4	5	6	-1
Nationalist Congress Party	Manipur	1	34			0	5	6	-1
Nationalist Congress Party	Punjab	2	34			0	5	6	-1
Nationalist Congress Party	Uttar Pradesh	1	34			0	5	6	-1
Nationalist Democratic Progressive Party (NDPP)	Nagaland	1				1		0	+1
Rashtriya Loktantrik Party	Rajasthan	1				1		0	+1
Revolutionary Socialist Party	Kerala	1	6			1	1	1	0
Revolutionary Socialist Party	West Bengal	4	6			0	1	1	0
Samajwadi Party	Andhra Pradesh	2	49			0	5	5	0
Samajwadi Party	Assam	1	49			0	5	5	0
Samajwadi Party	Bihar	1	49			0	5	5	0
Samajwadi Party	Jharkhand	1	49			0	5	5	0
Samajwadi Party	Madhya Pradesh	2	49			0	5	5	0
Samajwadi Party	Maharashtra	4	49			0	5	5	0
Samajwadi Party	Odisha	1	49			0	5	5	0
Samajwadi Party	Uttar Pradesh	37	49			5	5	5	0
Shiromani Akali Dal	Punjab	10				2		4	-2
Shivsena	Bihar	14	98			0	18	18	0
Shivsena	Chhattisgarh	9	98			0	18	18	0
Shivsena	Dadra & Nagar Haveli	2	98			0	18	18	0
Shivsena	Haryana	3	98			0	18	18	0
Shivsena	Jammu & Kashmir	3	98			0	18	18	0
Shivsena	Karnataka	2	98			0	18	18	0
Shivsena	Madhya Pradesh	5	98			0	18	18	0
Shivsena	Maharashtra	22	98			18	18	18	0
Shivsena	Punjab	6	98			0	18	18	0
Shivsena	Rajasthan	4	98			0	18	18	0
Shivsena	Telangana	1	98			0	18	18	0
Shivsena	Uttar Pradesh	11	98			0	18	18	0
Shivsena	West Bengal	16	98			0	18	18	0
Sikkim Krantikari Morcha	Sikkim	1				1		0	+1
Telangana Rashtra Samithi	Telangana	16				9		11	-2
Telugu Desam Party	Andhra Pradesh	25				3		15	-12
Viduthalai Chiruthaigal Katchi	Andhra Pradesh	3	7			0	1	0	+1
Viduthalai Chiruthaigal Katchi	Karnataka	2	7			0	1	0	+1
Viduthalai Chiruthaigal Katchi	Kerala	1	7			0	1	0	+1
Viduthalai Chiruthaigal Katchi	Tamil Nadu	1	7			1	1	0	+1
Yuvajana Sramika Rythu Congress Party	Andhra Pradesh	25				22		8	+14
All India N.R. Congress	Puducherry	1				0		1	-1
Pattali Makkal Katchi	Tamil Nadu	7				0		1	-1
Rashtriya Janata Dal	Bihar	19	21			0		4	-4
Rashtriya Janata Dal	Jharkhand	2	21			0		4	-4
Rashtriya Lok Samta Party	Bihar	5				0		3	-3
Sikkim Democratic Front	Sikkim	1				0		1	-1
Swabhimani Paksha	Maharashtra	2				0		1	-1
Indian National Lok Dal	Haryana	10				0		2	-2
Aap Aur Hum Party	Bihar	1				0		0	0
Aam Adhikar Morcha	Bihar	4	5			0		0	0
Aam Adhikar Morcha	Jharkhand	1	5			0		0	0
Akhil Bhartiya Apna Dal	Bihar	1	5			0		0	0
Akhil Bhartiya Apna Dal	Chandigarh	1	5			0		0	0
Akhil Bhartiya Apna Dal	Madhya Pradesh	2	5			0		0	0
Akhil Bhartiya Apna Dal	Punjab	1	5			0		0	0
Adim Bhartiya Dal	Haryana	1				0		0	0
Akhil Bhartiya Gondwana Party	Madhya Pradesh	4	5			0		0	0
Akhil Bhartiya Gondwana Party	Uttar Pradesh	1	5			0		0	0
Akhil Bharat Hindu Mahasabha	Jharkhand	1	5			0		0	0
Akhil Bharat Hindu Mahasabha	Madhya Pradesh	1	5			0		0	0
Akhil Bharat Hindu Mahasabha	Odisha	3	5			0		0	0
Akhil Bhartiya Mithila Party	Bihar	1				0		0	0
Akhil Bhartiya Jharkhand Party	Jharkhand					0		0	0
Akhil Bhartiya Jharkhand Party	West Bengal	1				0		0	0
Jharkhand Party	Jharkhand	4				0		0	0
Akhil Bharatiya Jan Sangh	Bihar	1	6			0		0	0
Akhil Bharatiya Jan Sangh	Gujarat	1	6			0		0	0
Akhil Bharatiya Jan Sangh	Haryana	1	6			0		0	0
Akhil Bharatiya Jan Sangh	Maharashtra	1	6			0		0	0
Akhil Bharatiya Jan Sangh	NCT OF Delhi	1	6			0		0	0
Akhil Bharatiya Jan Sangh	Uttar Pradesh	1	6			0		0	0
Akhil Bharatiya Muslim League (Secular)	Karnataka	1	2			0		0	0
Akhil Bharatiya Muslim League (Secular)	Telangana	1	2			0		0	0
Akhil Bharatiya Manavata Paksha	Maharashtra	1	2			0		0	0
Akhil Bharatiya Manavata Paksha	NCT OF Delhi	1	2			0		0	0
Akhil Bhartiya Navnirman Party	Uttar Pradesh	1				0		0	0
Atulya Bharat Party	NCT OF Delhi	1	2			0		0	0
Atulya Bharat Party	Uttar Pradesh	1	2			0		0	0
Aajad Bharat Party (Democratic)	Madhya Pradesh	2	6			0		0	0
Aajad Bharat Party (Democratic)	Uttar Pradesh	4	6			0		0	0
Akhil Bharatiya Sena	Maharashtra	1				0		0	0
Akhil Bhartiya Sarvadharma Samaj Party	Maharashtra	1				0		0	0
Andhra Chaitanya Party	Andhra Pradesh	1				0		0	0
Adarshwaadi Congress Party	Uttar Pradesh	1				0		0	0
Adhunik Bharat Party	Uttar Pradesh	2				0		0	0
Aadarsh Janata Sewa Party	Haryana	1				0		0	0
Ahila India Dhayaga Makkal Munnetra Katchi	Tamil Nadu	1				0		0	0
Asli Deshi Party	Bihar	4				0		0	0
Aadarsh Sangram Party	Uttar Pradesh	1				0		0	0
Apna Dal United Party	Uttar Pradesh	1				0		0	0
Adhikar Vikas Party	Chhattisgarh	1	2			0		0	0
Adhikar Vikas Party	Madhya Pradesh	1	2			0		0	0
Asom Gana Parishad	Assam	3	4			0		0	0
Asom Gana Parishad	Telangana	1	4			0		0	0
Akhil Hind Forward Bloc (Krantikari)	Bihar	2				0		0	0
Akhand Hind Party	Maharashtra	1				0		0	0
Ahimsa Socialist Party	Tamil Nadu	1				0		0	0
All India Forward Bloc	Andhra Pradesh	2	34			0		0	0
All India Forward Bloc	Arunachal Pradesh	1	34			0		0	0
All India Forward Bloc	Assam	3	34			0		0	0
All India Forward Bloc	Bihar	4	34			0		0	0
All India Forward Bloc	Chandigarh	1	34			0		0	0
All India Forward Bloc	Haryana	2	34			0		0	0
All India Forward Bloc	Himachal Pradesh	3	34			0		0	0
All India Forward Bloc	Jammu & Kashmir	1	34			0		0	0
All India Forward Bloc	Jharkhand	4	34			0		0	0
All India Forward Bloc	Madhya Pradesh	2	34			0		0	0
All India Forward Bloc	NCT OF Delhi	1	34			0		0	0
All India Forward Bloc	Odisha	2	34			0		0	0
All India Forward Bloc	Telangana	1	34			0		0	0
All India Forward Bloc	Uttar Pradesh	5	34			0		0	0
All India Forward Bloc	West Bengal	3	34			0		0	0
All India Hindustan Congress Party	Andaman & Nicobar Islands	1	4			0		0	0
All India Hindustan Congress Party	Gujarat	1	4			0		0	0
All India Hindustan Congress Party	Karnataka	1	4			0		0	0
All India Hindustan Congress Party	Madhya Pradesh	1	4			0		0	0
All India Jana Andolan Party	West Bengal	1				0		0	0
All India Labour Party	West Bengal	1				0		0	0
All India Minorities Front	Maharashtra	1	2			0		0	0
All India Minorities Front	Uttar Pradesh	2	2			0		0	0
Agila India Makkal Kazhagam	Kerala	1	4			0		0	0
Agila India Makkal Kazhagam	Puducherry	1	4			0		0	0
Agila India Makkal Kazhagam	Tamil Nadu	2	4			0		0	0
All Indians Party	Sikkim	1				0		0	0
All India Praja Party	Andhra Pradesh	3				0		0	0
All Indian Rajiv Congress Party	Uttar Pradesh	1				0		0	0
All India Ulama Congress	Madhya Pradesh	1				0		0	0
All India Uzhavargal Uzhaippalargal Katchi	Tamil Nadu	1				0		0	0
Akila India Vallalar Peravai	Tamil Nadu	1				0		0	0
Asom Jana Morcha	Assam	4				0		0	0
Aam Janta Party (India)	Uttar Pradesh	7				0		0	0
Aam Janta Party Rashtriya	Bihar	3				0		0	0
Aapki Apni Party (Peoples)	Haryana	7	21			0		0	0
Aapki Apni Party (Peoples)	Maharashtra	3	21			0		0	0
Aapki Apni Party (Peoples)	NCT OF Delhi	6	21			0		0	0
Aapki Apni Party (Peoples)	Uttar Pradesh	5	21			0		0	0
Akhil Bhartiya Ekata Party	Maharashtra	1				0		0	0
Akhil Bhartiya Lok Dal	Uttar Pradesh	1				0		0	0
Apna Kisan Party	Bihar	1				0		0	0
Akhand Samaj Party	Uttar Pradesh	2				0		0	0
Al-Hind Party	Uttar Pradesh	2				0		0	0
All India Peoples' Front (Radical)	Uttar Pradesh	1				0		0	0
All Pensioner'S Party	Tamil Nadu	1				0		0	0
Aasra Lokmanch Party	Maharashtra	2				0		0	0
Amra Bangalee	Jharkhand	2	10			0		0	0
Amra Bangalee	Tripura	2	10			0		0	0
Amra Bangalee	West Bengal	6	10			0		0	0
Anaithu Makkal Katchi	Tamil Nadu	1				0		0	0
Azad Mazdoor Kissan Party	Karnataka	1				0		0	0
Aadarsh Mithila Party	Bihar	2				0		0	0
Anaithu Makkal Puratchi Katchi	Tamil Nadu	2				0		0	0
Ambedkar Yug Party	Uttar Pradesh	1				0		0	0
Anaithu India Makkal Katchi		1				0		0	0
Anjaan Aadmi Party	NCT OF Delhi	1				0		0	0
Ambedkar National Congress	Andhra Pradesh	2	21			0		0	0
Ambedkar National Congress	Bihar	1	21			0		0	0
Ambedkar National Congress	Chandigarh	1	21			0		0	0
Ambedkar National Congress	Gujarat	2	21			0		0	0
Ambedkar National Congress	Jharkhand	1	21			0		0	0
Ambedkar National Congress	Maharashtra	4	21			0		0	0
Ambedkar National Congress	NCT OF Delhi	1	21			0		0	0
Ambedkar National Congress	Odisha	2	21			0		0	0
Ambedkar National Congress	Punjab	2	21			0		0	0
Ambedkar National Congress	Telangana	5	21			0		0	0
Annadata Party	Uttar Pradesh	1				0		0	0
Andaman & Nicobar Janta Party	Uttar Pradesh	1				0		0	0
Aihra National Party	Jharkhand	3	8			0		0	0
Aihra National Party	Karnataka	1	8			0		0	0
Aihra National Party	Telangana	1	8			0		0	0
Aihra National Party	West Bengal	3	8			0		0	0
Adarsh Nyay Rakshak Party	Madhya Pradesh	1				0		0	0
Ahinsa Samaj Party	Madhya Pradesh	1				0		0	0
Anti Corruption Dynamic Party	Maharashtra	1	11			0		0	0
Anti Corruption Dynamic Party	Puducherry	1	11			0		0	0
Anti Corruption Dynamic Party	Tamil Nadu	7	11			0		0	0
Anti Corruption Dynamic Party	Telangana	2	11			0		0	0
Apna Desh Party	Gujarat	2				0		0	0
Ambedkarite Party Of India	Andhra Pradesh	1	77			0		0	0
Ambedkarite Party Of India	Bihar	2	77			0		0	0
Ambedkarite Party Of India	Chhattisgarh	11	77			0		0	0
Ambedkarite Party Of India	Gujarat	1	77			0		0	0
Ambedkarite Party Of India	Himachal Pradesh	1	77			0		0	0
Ambedkarite Party Of India	Jharkhand	4	77			0		0	0
Ambedkarite Party Of India	Karnataka	1	77			0		0	0
Ambedkarite Party Of India	Kerala	3	77			0		0	0
Ambedkarite Party Of India	Madhya Pradesh	8	77			0		0	0
Ambedkarite Party Of India	Maharashtra	16	77			0		0	0
Ambedkarite Party Of India	Odisha	6	77			0		0	0
Ambedkarite Party Of India	Punjab	4	77			0		0	0
Ambedkarite Party Of India	Rajasthan	15	77			0		0	0
Ambedkarite Party Of India	Tamil Nadu	1	77			0		0	0
Ambedkarite Party Of India	Telangana	1	77			0		0	0
Ambedkarite Party Of India	Tripura	1	77			0		0	0
Ambedkarite Party Of India	West Bengal	1	77			0		0	0
Apna Samaj Party		1				0		0	0
All Peoples Party	Andhra Pradesh	1				0		0	0
Ambedkarist Republican Party	Maharashtra	2				0		0	0
Andhra Rastra Praja Samithi	Andhra Pradesh	1				0		0	0
Akhand Rashtrawadi Party	Madhya Pradesh	1	4			0		0	0
Akhand Rashtrawadi Party	NCT OF Delhi	2	4			0		0	0
Akhand Rashtrawadi Party	Uttar Pradesh	1	4			0		0	0
Autonomous State Demand Committee	Assam	1				0		0	0
Assam Dristi Party	Assam	1				0		0	0
Akhil Bharat Samagra Kranti Party	Chhattisgarh	1				0		0	0
Adarsh Samaj Party	Uttar Pradesh	2				0		0	0
Ambedkar Samaj Party	Karnataka	4	8			0		0	0
Ambedkar Samaj Party	Uttar Pradesh	4	8			0		0	0
All India Puratchi Thalaivar Makkal Munnettra Kazhagam	Tamil Nadu	1				0		0	0
Aarakshan Virodhi Party	Madhya Pradesh	2	4			0		0	0
Aarakshan Virodhi Party	Rajasthan	2	4			0		0	0
Awami Samta Party	Uttar Pradesh	3				0		0	0
Anna Ysr Congress Party	Andhra Pradesh	2				0		0	0
B. C. United Front	Andhra Pradesh	1				0		0	0
Bharatiya Aavaam Ekta Party	Uttar Pradesh	1				0		0	0
Bahujan Azad Party	Bihar	1	2			0		0	0
Bahujan Azad Party	Maharashtra	1	2			0		0	0
Bahujan Samyak Party (Mission)	Uttar Pradesh	1				0		0	0
Bahujan Awam Party	Uttar Pradesh	4				0		0	0
Bharatiya Aam Awam Party	Bihar	1				0		0	0
Bhartiya Anarakshit Party	Telangana	3	4			0		0	0
Bhartiya Anarakshit Party	Uttar Pradesh	1	4			0		0	0
Bhartiya Azad Sena	Jharkhand	1				0		0	0
Bharatiya Bahujan Congress	Bihar	5	6			0		0	0
Bharatiya Bahujan Congress	Gujarat	1	6			0		0	0
Bharipa Bahujan Mahasangh	Karnataka	2				0		0	0
Bharat Bhrashtachar Mitao Party	Bihar	1				0		0	0
Bhartiya Bhaichara Party	Uttar Pradesh	2				0		0	0
Bharatiya Bahujan Samta Party	Uttar Pradesh	2				0		0	0
Bharath Dharma Jana Sena	Kerala	4				0		0	0
Bharatrashtra Democratic Party	Uttar Pradesh	1				0		0	0
Bharatiya Gana Parishad	Assam	4				0		0	0
Bhartiya Amrit Party	Madhya Pradesh	2				0		0	0
Bharatiya Bahujan Parivartan Party	Uttar Pradesh	1				0		0	0
Bharatiya Jan Morcha Party	Madhya Pradesh	1				0		0	0
Bharatiya Praja Surajya Paksha	Maharashtra	8				0		0	0
Bharatiya Rashtravadi Samanta Party	Uttar Pradesh	1				0		0	0
Bharatiya Samta Samaj Party	Bihar	1	3			0		0	0
Bharatiya Samta Samaj Party	Uttar Pradesh	2	3			0		0	0
Bharatiya Sarvodaya Kranti Party	Uttar Pradesh	1				0		0	0
Bhartiya Janta Dal (Integrated)	NCT OF Delhi	1				0		0	0
Bharatiya National Janta Dal	West Bengal	1				0		0	0
Bhartiya Lokmat Rashtrwadi Party	Bihar	2	7			0		0	0
Bhartiya Lokmat Rashtrwadi Party	Chhattisgarh	1	7			0		0	0
Bhartiya Lokmat Rashtrwadi Party	Jharkhand	1	7			0		0	0
Bhartiya Lokmat Rashtrwadi Party	Madhya Pradesh	1	7			0		0	0
Bhartiya Lokmat Rashtrwadi Party	Maharashtra	1	7			0		0	0
Bhartiya Lokmat Rashtrwadi Party	Uttar Pradesh	1	7			0		0	0
Bhartiya Manvadhikaar Federal Party		1				0		0	0
Bhartiya Naujawan Inklav Party	Uttar Pradesh	1				0		0	0
Bhartiyabahujankranti Dal	Karnataka	2	5			0		0	0
Bhartiyabahujankranti Dal	Maharashtra	3	5			0		0	0
Bharatiya Bahujan Party	Chhattisgarh	1				0		0	0
Bharat Bhoomi Party	Chhattisgarh	2	3			0		0	0
Bharat Bhoomi Party	Karnataka	1	3			0		0	0
Bhartiya Dalit Party	Bihar	3				0		0	0
Bhartiya Hind Fauj	Uttar Pradesh	2				0		0	0
Bhartiya Janta Dal	Uttar Pradesh	1				0		0	0
Bhartiya Janraj Party	Haryana	2	4			0		0	0
Bhartiya Janraj Party	Punjab	2	4			0		0	0
Bahujan Maha Party	Andhra Pradesh	1	20			0		0	0
Bahujan Maha Party	Gujarat	1	20			0		0	0
Bahujan Maha Party	Haryana	1	20			0		0	0
Bahujan Maha Party	Karnataka	2	20			0		0	0
Bahujan Maha Party	Madhya Pradesh	1	20			0		0	0
Bahujan Maha Party	Maharashtra	13	20			0		0	0
Bahujan Maha Party	Uttar Pradesh	1	20			0		0	0
Bharat Nirman Party	Bihar	1				0		0	0
Bhartiya Harit Party	Uttar Pradesh	1				0		0	0
Bharatiya Peoples Party	Karnataka	1				0		0	0
Bharatiya Rashtravadi Paksha	Gujarat	1				0		0	0
Bharatiya Sampuran Krantikari Party	Uttar Pradesh	1				0		0	0
Bhartiya Sarvodaya Party	Jharkhand	1	2			0		0	0
Bhartiya Sarvodaya Party	Uttarakhand	1	2			0		0	0
Bhartiya Insan Party	Bihar	1	3			0		0	0
Bhartiya Insan Party	NCT OF Delhi	2	3			0		0	0
Bharat Jan Aadhar Party	Maharashtra	4				0		0	0
Bharatiya Jan Kranti Dal (Democratic)	Bihar	4	7			0		0	0
Bharatiya Jan Kranti Dal (Democratic)	Jharkhand	1	7			0		0	0
Bharatiya Jan Kranti Dal (Democratic)	Karnataka	1	7			0		0	0
Bharatiya Jan Kranti Dal (Democratic)	Uttar Pradesh	1	7			0		0	0
Bhartiya Jan Nayak Party	Uttar Pradesh	4				0		0	0
Bhartiya Jan Samman Party	Chandigarh	1	2			0		0	0
Bhartiya Jan Samman Party	Haryana	1	2			0		0	0
Bhartiya Jan Sampark Party	Madhya Pradesh	1				0		0	0
Bhartiya Jan Satta Party	Rajasthan	1				0		0	0
Bundelkhand Kranti Dal	Uttar Pradesh	1				0		0	0
Bhartiya Kisan Party	Chandigarh	4	15			0		0	0
Bhartiya Kisan Party	Haryana	1	15			0		0	0
Bhartiya Kisan Party	Maharashtra	5	15			0		0	0
Bhartiya Kisan Party	NCT OF Delhi	1	15			0		0	0
Bhartiya Kisan Party	Rajasthan	1	15			0		0	0
Bhartiya Kisan Party	Uttar Pradesh	3	15			0		0	0
Bharatiya Kisan Parivartan Party	Uttar Pradesh	1				0		0	0
Bhartiya Krishak Dal	Uttar Pradesh	4				0		0	0
Bhartiya Kisan Union Samaj Party	Uttar Pradesh	1				0		0	0
Bhartiya Kranti Vir Party	Bihar	1				0		0	0
Bihar Lok Nirman Dal	Bihar	8				0		0	0
Baliraja Party	Bihar	2	7			0		0	0
Baliraja Party	Maharashtra	4	7			0		0	0
Baliraja Party	Uttar Pradesh	1	7			0		0	0
Bhartiya Lok Seva Dal	Jharkhand	1	10			0		0	0
Bhartiya Lok Seva Dal	Punjab	7	10			0		0	0
Bhartiya Lok Seva Dal	Uttar Pradesh	2	10			0		0	0
Bharat Lok Sewak Party	NCT OF Delhi	3	4			0		0	0
Bharat Lok Sewak Party	Uttar Pradesh	1	4			0		0	0
Bhartiya Manavadhikaar Federal Party	Chandigarh	1	9			0		0	0
Bhartiya Manavadhikaar Federal Party	Gujarat	1	9			0		0	0
Bhartiya Manavadhikaar Federal Party	Jharkhand	1	9			0		0	0
Bhartiya Manavadhikaar Federal Party	Maharashtra	5	9			0		0	0
Bhartiya Manavadhikaar Federal Party	Odisha	1	9			0		0	0
Bharateeya Manavadhikar party	West Bengal	2				0		0	0
Bharatiya Momin Front	Bihar	7	8			0		0	0
Bharatiya Momin Front	Jharkhand	1	8			0		0	0
Bharatiya Majdoor Janta Party	Uttar Pradesh	1				0		0	0
Bahujan Mukti Party	Assam	1	120			0		0	0
Bahujan Mukti Party	Bihar	12	120			0		0	0
Bahujan Mukti Party	Chandigarh	1	120			0		0	0
Bahujan Mukti Party	Dadra & Nagar Haveli	1	120			0		0	0
Bahujan Mukti Party	Gujarat	6	120			0		0	0
Bahujan Mukti Party	Haryana	5	120			0		0	0
Bahujan Mukti Party	Himachal Pradesh	1	120			0		0	0
Bahujan Mukti Party	Jharkhand	5	120			0		0	0
Bahujan Mukti Party	Karnataka	1	120			0		0	0
Bahujan Mukti Party	Madhya Pradesh	9	120			0		0	0
Bahujan Mukti Party	Maharashtra	35	120			0		0	0
Bahujan Mukti Party	Odisha	5	120			0		0	0
Bahujan Mukti Party	Punjab	6	120			0		0	0
Bahujan Mukti Party	Rajasthan	2	120			0		0	0
Bahujan Mukti Party	Telangana	7	120			0		0	0
Bahujan Mukti Party	Uttar Pradesh	10	120			0		0	0
Bahujan Mukti Party	Uttarakhand	2	120			0		0	0
Bahujan Mukti Party	West Bengal	6	120			0		0	0
Bharatiya Minorities Suraksha Mahasangh	Jharkhand	1	2			0		0	0
Bharatiya Minorities Suraksha Mahasangh	Maharashtra	1	2			0		0	0
Bhartiya Manav Samaj Party	Madhya Pradesh	1	3			0		0	0
Bhartiya Manav Samaj Party	Uttar Pradesh	2	3			0		0	0
Bhartiya Mitra Party	Bihar	3				0		0	0
Bahujan Nyay Dal	Bihar	3	4			0		0	0
Bahujan Nyay Dal	Uttar Pradesh	1	4			0		0	0
Bhartiya Nojawan Dal	Uttar Pradesh	1				0		0	0
Bhartiya Navodaya Party	Uttar Pradesh	1				0		0	0
Bharatiya Nyay-Adhikar Raksha Party	West Bengal	7				0		0	0
Bhartiya Navjawan Sena (Paksha)	Maharashtra	3				0		0	0
Bhartiya New Sanskar Krantikari Party	Bihar	1				0		0	0
Bhartiya Pragatisheel Congress	NCT OF Delhi	1				0		0	0
Bhartiya Panchyat Party	Jharkhand	2				0		0	0
Bodoland Peoples Front	Assam	1				0		0	0
Bharat Prabhat Party	Bihar	2	53			0		0	0
Bharat Prabhat Party	Chandigarh	1	53			0		0	0
Bharat Prabhat Party	Chhattisgarh	1	53			0		0	0
Bharat Prabhat Party	Haryana	5	53			0		0	0
Bharat Prabhat Party	Jharkhand	2	53			0		0	0
Bharat Prabhat Party	Karnataka	2	53			0		0	0
Bharat Prabhat Party	Madhya Pradesh	8	53			0		0	0
Bharat Prabhat Party	Maharashtra	5	53			0		0	0
Bharat Prabhat Party	NCT OF Delhi	2	53			0		0	0
Bharat Prabhat Party	Odisha	2	53			0		0	0
Bharat Prabhat Party	Punjab	5	53			0		0	0
Bharat Prabhat Party	Uttar Pradesh	16	53			0		0	0
Bharat Prabhat Party	West Bengal	2	53			0		0	0
Bharatiya Prajagala Kalyana Paksha	Karnataka	2				0		0	0
Bhapase Party	Maharashtra	1				0		0	0
Bharatiya Rashtriya Morcha	Bihar	1	2			0		0	0
Bharatiya Rashtriya Morcha	Uttar Pradesh	1	2			0		0	0
Bahujana Raajyam Party (Phule Ambedkar)	Telangana	1				0		0	0
Bharat Rakshak Party (Democratic)	Rajasthan	2				0		0	0
Bhartiya Republican Party (Insan)	Uttar Pradesh	1				0		0	0
Bahujan Republican Socialist Party	Gujarat	1	27			0		0	0
Bahujan Republican Socialist Party	Maharashtra	26	27			0		0	0
Bhartiya Rashtrawadi Party	Chandigarh	1				0		0	0
Bhartiya Shakti Chetna Party	Chhattisgarh	5	35			0		0	0
Bhartiya Shakti Chetna Party	Gujarat	1	35			0		0	0
Bhartiya Shakti Chetna Party	Haryana	5	35			0		0	0
Bhartiya Shakti Chetna Party	Himachal Pradesh	1	35			0		0	0
Bhartiya Shakti Chetna Party	Madhya Pradesh	11	35			0		0	0
Bhartiya Shakti Chetna Party	Maharashtra	1	35			0		0	0
Bhartiya Shakti Chetna Party	Punjab	1	35			0		0	0
Bhartiya Shakti Chetna Party	Uttar Pradesh	10	35			0		0	0
Bahujan Suraksha Dal	Gujarat	1				0		0	0
Bhartiya Sarvjan Hitey Samaj Party	Chhattisgarh	1				0		0	0
Bhartiya Tribal Party	Chhattisgarh	2	19			0		0	0
Bhartiya Tribal Party	Dadra & Nagar Haveli	1	19			0		0	0
Bhartiya Tribal Party	Gujarat	6	19			0		0	0
Bhartiya Tribal Party	Madhya Pradesh	1	19			0		0	0
Bhartiya Tribal Party	Maharashtra	5	19			0		0	0
Bhartiya Tribal Party	Rajasthan	4	19			0		0	0
Bahujan Samaj Party (AMBEDKAR)	Chandigarh	1	5			0		0	0
Bahujan Samaj Party (AMBEDKAR)	Punjab	4	5			0		0	0
Bahujan Vikas Aaghadi	Maharashtra	1				0		0	0
Bajjikanchal Vikas Party	Bihar	7				0		0	0
Bhartiya Vanchitsamaj Party	Uttar Pradesh	1				0		0	0
Corruption Abolition Party	NCT OF Delhi	1				0		0	0
Christian Democratic Front	Tamil Nadu	1				0		0	0
Challengers Party	NCT OF Delhi	2				0		0	0
Chandigarh Ki Aawaz Party	Chandigarh	1				0		0	0
Communist Party Of India (MARXIST-LENINIST) (LIBERATION)	Andhra Pradesh	2	18			0		0	0
Communist Party Of India (MARXIST-LENINIST) (LIBERATION)	Bihar	4	18			0		0	0
Communist Party Of India (MARXIST-LENINIST) (LIBERATION)	Jharkhand	2	18			0		0	0
Communist Party Of India (MARXIST-LENINIST) (LIBERATION)	Odisha	2	18			0		0	0
Communist Party Of India (MARXIST-LENINIST) (LIBERATION)	Puducherry	1	18			0		0	0
Communist Party Of India (MARXIST-LENINIST) (LIBERATION)	Punjab	3	18			0		0	0
Communist Party Of India (MARXIST-LENINIST) (LIBERATION)	Tamil Nadu	2	18			0		0	0
Communist Party Of India (MARXIST-LENINIST) (LIBERATION)	Uttar Pradesh	3	18			0		0	0
Communist Party Of India (MARXIST-LENINIST) (LIBERATION)	Uttarakhand	1	18			0		0	0
Communist Party Of India (MARXIST-LENINIST) (LIBERATION)	West Bengal	2	18			0		0	0
Communist Party of India (Marxist–Leninist) CPI(M)(L)			4			0		0	0
Communist Party of India (Marxist–Leninist) Red Star			4			0		0	0
Communist Party Of India (Marxist–Leninist) Red Star	Andhra Pradesh	1	25			0		0	0
Communist Party Of India (Marxist–Leninist) Red Star	Chandigarh	2	25			0		0	0
Communist Party Of India (Marxist–Leninist) Red Star	Jharkhand	3	25			0		0	0
Communist Party Of India (Marxist–Leninist) Red Star	Karnataka	2	25			0		0	0
Communist Party Of India (Marxist–Leninist) Red Star	Kerala	4	25			0		0	0
Communist Party Of India (Marxist–Leninist) Red Star	Madhya Pradesh	1	25			0		0	0
Communist Party Of India (Marxist–Leninist) Red Star	Maharashtra	2	25			0		0	0
Communist Party Of India (Marxist–Leninist) Red Star	Odisha	5	25			0		0	0
Communist Party Of India (Marxist–Leninist) Red Star	Rajasthan	1	25			0		0	0
Communist Party Of India (Marxist–Leninist) Red Star	Tamil Nadu	1	25			0		0	0
Communist Party Of India (Marxist–Leninist) Red Star	Uttar Pradesh	2	25			0		0	0
Communist Party Of India (Marxist–Leninist) Red Star	West Bengal	5	25			0		0	0
Chhattisgarh Swabhiman Manch	Chhattisgarh	1	2			0		0	0
Chhattisgarh Swabhiman Manch	Maharashtra	1	2			0		0	0
Chhattisgarh Vikas Ganga Rashtriya Party	Chhattisgarh	1	2			0		0	0
Chhattisgarh Vikas Ganga Rashtriya Party	Madhya Pradesh	1	2			0		0	0
Dr. Bhimrao Ambedkar Dal	Uttar Pradesh	1				0		0	0
Dalita Bahujana Party	Telangana	3				0		0	0
Democratic Corruption Liberation Front		1				0		0	0
Democratic Party of India (Ambedkar)	Punjab	1	3			0		0	0
Desh Janhit Party	Maharashtra	1				0		0	0
Daksha Party	Haryana	1				0		0	0
Desiya Murpokku Dravida Kazhagam	Tamil Nadu	4				0		0	0
Desiya Makkal Sakthi Katchi	Maharashtra	1	9			0		0	0
Desiya Makkal Sakthi Katchi	Tamil Nadu	8	9			0		0	0
Dogra Swabhiman Sangathan Party,	Jammu & Kashmir	2				0		0	0
Democratic Party Of India		1				0		0	0
Democratic Prajakranthi Party Secularist	Karnataka	1				0		0	0
Dalit Soshit Pichhara Varg Adhikar Dal	Haryana	1	3			0		0	0
Dalit Soshit Pichhara Varg Adhikar Dal	Maharashtra	1	3			0		0	0
Dalit Soshit Pichhara Varg Adhikar Dal	Rajasthan	1	3			0		0	0
Desiya Uzhavar Uzhaipalar Kazhagam	Tamil Nadu	3				0		0	0
Engineers Party	Karnataka	1				0		0	0
Ekta Samaj Party	NCT OF Delhi	1				0		0	0
Ezhuchi Tamilargal Munnetra Kazhagam	Tamil Nadu	3				0		0	0
Forward Democratic Labour Party	Chhattisgarh	1				0		0	0
Fauji Janta Party	Uttar Pradesh	1				0		0	0
Freethought Party Of India	Odisha	3				0		0	0
Gareeb Aadmi Party	Karnataka	1				0		0	0
Gondvana Gantantra Party	Chhattisgarh	9	23			0		0	0
Gondvana Gantantra Party	Madhya Pradesh	9	23			0		0	0
Gondvana Gantantra Party	Maharashtra	2	23			0		0	0
Gondvana Gantantra Party	Odisha	1	23			0		0	0
Gondvana Gantantra Party	Uttar Pradesh	2	23			0		0	0
Garvi Gujarat Party	Gujarat	3				0		0	0
Garib Janshakti Party	Bihar	2				0		0	0
Gujarat Janta Panchayat Party	Gujarat	1				0		0	0
Ganasangam Party Of India	Tamil Nadu	3				0		0	0
Gorkha Rashtriya Congress	West Bengal	1				0		0	0
Hindustani Awam Morcha (Secular)	Bihar	3				0		0	0
Hamari Apni Party	Maharashtra	1				0		0	0
Hardam Manavtawadi Rashtriya Dal	Andhra Pradesh	1				0		0	0
Hind Congress Party	Haryana	1	2			0		0	0
Hind Congress Party	Punjab	1	2			0		0	0
Hindu Samaj Party		1				0		0	0
Hindustan Janta Party	Karnataka	3	7			0		0	0
Hindustan Janta Party	Maharashtra	4	7			0		0	0
Hindusthan Praja Paksha	Maharashtra	1				0		0	0
Himachal Jan Kranti Party	Himachal Pradesh	1				0		0	0
Hindusthan Nirman Dal	Assam	5	47			0		0	0
Hindusthan Nirman Dal	Bihar	2	47			0		0	0
Hindusthan Nirman Dal	Gujarat	9	47			0		0	0
Hindusthan Nirman Dal	Jammu & Kashmir	1	47			0		0	0
Hindusthan Nirman Dal	Jharkhand	2	47			0		0	0
Hindusthan Nirman Dal	Madhya Pradesh	8	47			0		0	0
Hindusthan Nirman Dal	Maharashtra	2	47			0		0	0
Hindusthan Nirman Dal	Odisha	2	47			0		0	0
Hindusthan Nirman Dal	Rajasthan	1	47			0		0	0
Hindusthan Nirman Dal	Uttar Pradesh	14	47			0		0	0
Hindusthan Nirman Dal	Uttarakhand	1	47			0		0	0
Hamro Sikkim Party	Sikkim	1				0		0	0
Hind Samrajya Party	Bihar	1				0		0	0
Hindustan Shakti Sena	Chandigarh	1	9			0		0	0
Hindustan Shakti Sena	Punjab	8	9			0		0	0
Hum Bhartiya Party	Jharkhand	1	9			0		0	0
Hum Bhartiya Party	Maharashtra	5	9			0		0	0
Hum Bhartiya Party	NCT OF Delhi	1	9			0		0	0
Hum Bhartiya Party	Punjab	1	9			0		0	0
Hum Bhartiya Party	Telangana	1	9			0		0	0
Hum Sabki Party	Uttar Pradesh	1				0		0	0
Indian Christian Front	Karnataka	2	4			0		0	0
Indian Christian Front	Tamil Nadu	2	4			0		0	0
Indian Democratic Republican Front	Punjab	1	2			0		0	0
Indian Democratic Republican Front	West Bengal	1	2			0		0	0
Indian Gandhiyan Party	Kerala	1	2			0		0	0
Indian Gandhiyan Party	Uttar Pradesh		2			0		0	0
Indian Indira Congress (R)	Rajasthan	1				0		0	0
Indian Labour Party (Ambedkar Phule)	Andhra Pradesh	1	4			0		0	0
Indian Labour Party (Ambedkar Phule)	Karnataka	3	4			0		0	0
Ilantamilar Munnani Kazhagam	Tamil Nadu	1				0		0	0
Indian New Congress Party	Karnataka	4				0		0	0
Independent People'S Party	Jammu & Kashmir	1				0		0	0
Indian National League	Uttar Pradesh	2				0		0	0
India Praja Bandhu Party	Andhra Pradesh	4	11			0		0	0
India Praja Bandhu Party	Chhattisgarh	1	11			0		0	0
India Praja Bandhu Party	Telangana	6	11			0		0	0
Indigenousn People'S Front Of Tripura	Tripura	2				0		0	0
Indian Peoples Green Party	Rajasthan	2				0		0	0
Indian Rakshaka Nayakudu Party	Telangana	1				0		0	0
Indian Unity Centre	West Bengal	2				0		0	0
Inqalab Vikas Dal	Uttar Pradesh	1				0		0	0
Jan Adesh Akshuni Sena	Uttar Pradesh	1				0		0	0
Jan Adhikar Party	Bihar	6	19			0		0	0
Jan Adhikar Party	Madhya Pradesh	3	19			0		0	0
Jan Adhikar Party	Maharashtra	7	19			0		0	0
Jan Adhikar Party	Uttar Pradesh	3	19			0		0	0
Jan Adhikar Party (Loktantrik)	Bihar	1				0		0	0
Jharkhand Anushilan Party	West Bengal	1				0		0	0
Janta Dal Rashtravadi	Bihar	3				0		0	0
Jamat-E-Seratul Mustakim	West Bengal	2				0		0	0
Jago Hindustan Party	Bihar	3				0		0	0
Jharkhand Party (Secular)	Jharkhand	1				0		0	0
Janhit Bharat Party	Uttar Pradesh	2				0		0	0
Jharkhand Party	Jharkhand	4				0		0	0
Jai Hind Party	Bihar	1				0		0	0
Jai Hind Samaj Party	Uttar Pradesh	1				0		0	0
Jai Jawan Jai Kisan Party	Haryana	1	4			0		0	0
Jai Jawan Jai Kisan Party	Punjab	3	4			0		0	0
Jannayak Janta Party	Haryana	7				0		0	0
Janhit Kisan Party	Bihar	2	8			0		0	0
Janhit Kisan Party	Uttar Pradesh	6	8			0		0	0
Jammu & Kashmir Pir Panjal Awami Party	Jammu & Kashmir	1				0		0	0
Jai Lok Party	Madhya Pradesh	1				0		0	0
Jai Maha Bharath Party	Maharashtra	1	3			0		0	0
Jai Maha Bharath Party	NCT OF Delhi	1	3			0		0	0
Jai Maha Bharath Party	Sikkim	1	3			0		0	0
Jharkhand Mukti Morcha (Ulgulan)		1				0		0	0
Janata Congress	Jharkhand	2	7			0		0	0
Janata Congress	Madhya Pradesh	3	7			0		0	0
Janata Congress	Maharashtra	1	7			0		0	0
Janata Congress	Uttar Pradesh	1	7			0		0	0
Jana Jagruti Party	Andhra Pradesh	7				0		0	0
Janata Party	Bihar	4				0		0	0
Jharkhand Party (Naren)	Jharkhand	1	2			0		0	0
Jharkhand Party (Naren)	West Bengal	1	2			0		0	0
Janvadi Party(Socialist)	Bihar	1	2			0		0	0
Janvadi Party(Socialist)	Uttar Pradesh	1	2			0		0	0
Janapaalana Party (Democratic)	Andhra Pradesh	1				0		0	0
Jai Prakash Janata Dal	Bihar	5	11			0		0	0
Jai Prakash Janata Dal	Jharkhand	2	11			0		0	0
Jai Prakash Janata Dal	NCT OF Delhi	2	11			0		0	0
Jai Prakash Janata Dal	Odisha	2	11			0		0	0
Jharkhand People's Party	Jharkhand		4			0		0	0
Jharkhand People's Party	Jharkhand People's Party	1	4			0		0	0
Janta Raj Party	Uttar Pradesh	2				0		0	0
Janral Samaj Party	Chandigarh	1	5			0		0	0
Janral Samaj Party	Punjab	4	5			0		0	0
Janta Raj Vikas Party	Bihar	1				0		0	0
Jan Shakti Dal	Uttar Pradesh	2				0		0	0
Jansatta Dal Loktantrik	Uttar Pradesh	2				0		0	0
Jan Shakti Ekta Party	Uttar Pradesh	1				0		0	0
Jan Samman Party	Madhya Pradesh	1	3			0		0	0
Jan Samman Party	NCT OF Delhi	1	3			0		0	0
	Uttar Pradesh	1	3			0		0	0
Jan Sangh Party	West Bengal	1				0		0	0
Janasena Party	Andhra Pradesh	17	24			0		0	0
Janasena Party	Telangana	7	24			0		0	0
Jan Satya Path Party	Gujarat	4				0		0	0
Jai Swaraj Party	Telangana	1				0		0	0
Jan Seva Sahayak Party	Uttar Pradesh	2				0		0	0
Jansatta Party	Uttar Pradesh	2				0		0	0
Jan Sangharsh Virat Party	Gujarat	2	5			0		0	0
Jan Sangharsh Virat Party	Jharkhand	1	5			0		0	0
Jan Sangharsh Virat Party	Rajasthan	1	5			0		0	0
Jan Sangharsh Virat Party	West Bengal	1	5			0		0	0
Janta Kranti Party (Rashtravadi)	Uttar Pradesh	2				0		0	0
Justice Party		1				0		0	0
Jai Vijaya Bharathi Party	Karnataka	1				0		0	0
Jantantrik Vikas Party	Bihar	3				0		0	0
Jharkhand Vikas Morcha (Prajatantrik)	Jharkhand	2				0		0	0
Jwala Dal	Uttar Pradesh	1				0		0	0
Jammu & Kashmir National Panthers Party	Bihar	1				0		0	0
Jammu & Kashmir National Panthers Party	Jammu & Kashmir	5				0		0	0
Jammu & Kashmir National Panthers Party	NCT OF Delhi	1				0		0	0
Jammu & Kashmir National Panthers Party	Tamil Nadu	1				0		0	0
Jammu & Kashmir Peoples Democratic Party +	Jammu & Kashmir	2				0		0	0
Jammu & Kashmir People Conference	Jammu & Kashmir	3				0		0	0
Kamatapur People'S Party (United)	West Bengal	6				0		0	0
Kerala Congress	Kerala	1				0		0	0
Kannada Chalavali Vatal Paksha	Karnataka	1				0		0	0
Kisan Raj Party	Madhya Pradesh	1				0		0	0
Kisan Raksha Party	Uttar Pradesh	1				0		0	0
Karnataka Jantha Paksha	Karnataka	2				0		0	0
Karnataka Karmikara Paksha	Karnataka	4				0		0	0
Kalinga Sena	Jharkhand	1	5			0		0	0
Kalinga Sena	Odisha	4	5			0		0	0
Kisan Majdoor Berojgar Sangh	Uttar Pradesh	1				0		0	0
Kisan Mazdoor Sangharsh Party	Uttar Pradesh	4				0		0	0
Karnataka Pragnyavantha Janatha Party	Karnataka	1				0		0	0
Kisan Party Of India	Madhya Pradesh	2				0		0	0
Karnataka Praja Party (Raithaparva)	Karnataka	2				0		0	0
Kranti Kari Jai Hind Sena	Karnataka	1	5			0		0	0
Kranti Kari Jai Hind Sena	Maharashtra	4	5			0		0	0
Kartavya Rashtriya Party	Uttar Pradesh	1				0		0	0
Krupaa Party	Odisha	3				0		0	0
Kanshiram Bahujan Dal	NCT OF Delhi	1	5			0		0	0
Kanshiram Bahujan Dal	Uttar Pradesh	4	5			0		0	0
Khusro Sena Party	Uttar Pradesh	1				0		0	0
Kalyankari Jantantrik Party	Uttar Pradesh	1				0		0	0
Lok Chetna Dal	Bihar	1				0		0	0
Lok Gathbandhan Party	Gujarat	1	7			0		0	0
Lok Gathbandhan Party	Uttar Pradesh	6	7			0		0	0
Lok Insaaf Party	Punjab	3				0		0	0
Lok Jan Sangharsh Party	Uttar Pradesh	1				0		0	0
Loktantrik Jan Swaraj Party	Bihar	1				0		0	0
Lok Jan Vikas Morcha	Bihar	2				0		0	0
Lok Dal	Uttar Pradesh	5				0		0	0
Lokjagar Party	Maharashtra	1				0		0	0
Loktantrik Janshakti Party	Uttar Pradesh	1				0		0	0
Lokpriya Samaj Party	Haryana	1				0		0	0
Loktanter Suraksha Party	Haryana	2				0		0	0
Loktantrik Rashrtavadi Party	Gujarat	1				0		0	0
Lok Sewa Dal	Bihar	1				0		0	0
Loksangram	Maharashtra	1				0		0	0
Maharashtra Swabhimaan Paksh	Maharashtra	2				0		0	0
Makkal Sananayaga Kudiyarasu Katchi	Tamil Nadu	1				0		0	0
Manipur People'S Party	Manipur	1				0		0	0
Moulik Adhikar Party	Bihar	1	13			0		0	0
Moulik Adhikar Party	Uttar Pradesh	12	13			0		0	0
Mera Adhikaar Rashtriya Dal	Uttar Pradesh	2				0		0	0
Marxist Communist Party Of India (United)	Andhra Pradesh	1	6			0		0	0
Marxist Communist Party Of India (United)	Kerala	1	6			0		0	0
Marxist Communist Party Of India (United)	Rajasthan	1	6			0		0	0
Marxist Communist Party Of India (United)	Telangana	3	6			0		0	0
Mazdoor Dalit Kisaan Mahila Gareeb Party (Hindustani)	Uttar Pradesh	1				0		0	0
Minorities Democratic Party	Madhya Pradesh	2	3			0		0	0
Minorities Democratic Party	Uttar Pradesh	1	3			0		0	0
Manipur Democratic Peoples's Front	Manipur	1				0		0	0
Mundadugu Praja Party	Andhra Pradesh	4				0		0	0
Mahamukti Dal	Uttar Pradesh	1				0		0	0
Mahasankalp Janta Party	Uttar Pradesh	2				0		0	0
Makkalatchi Katchi	Tamil Nadu	2				0		0	0
Manav Kranti Party	Uttar Pradesh	1				0		0	0
Maharashtra Kranti Sena	Maharashtra	2				0		0	0
Majdoor Kisan Union Party	Uttar Pradesh	1				0		0	0
Mazdoor Kirayedar Vikas Party	NCT OF Delhi	5				0		0	0
Marxist Leninist Party Of India (Red Flag)	Karnataka	1	3			0		0	0
Marxist Leninist Party Of India (Red Flag)	Maharashtra	2	3			0		0	0
Mithilanchal Mukti Morcha	Bihar	1				0		0	0
Makkal Needhi Maiam	Puducherry	1	38			0		0	0
Makkal Needhi Maiam	Tamil Nadu	37	38			0		0	0
Manvadhikar National Party	Gujarat	2	4			0		0	0
Manvadhikar National Party	Jammu & Kashmir	2	4			0		0	0
Manavtawadi Samaj Party	Uttar Pradesh	2				0		0	0
Madhya Pradesh Jan Vikas Party	Madhya Pradesh	3				0		0	0
Mulnibasi Party of India	West Bengal	2				0		0	0
Moolniwasi Samaj Party	Bihar	2	3			0		0	0
Moolniwasi Samaj Party	Jharkhand	1	3			0		0	0
Maanavvaadi Janta Party	Bihar	2				0		0	0
Manuvadi Party	Uttar Pradesh	1				0		0	0
Mahila & Yuva Shakti Party	Haryana	1				0		0	0
New All India Congress Party	Gujarat	2				0		0	0
National Apni Party	NCT OF Delhi	1				0		0	0
Nationalist People'S Front	Rajasthan	1				0		0	0
Nirbhay Bharteey Party	Gujarat	1				0		0	0
National Bhrashtachar Mukt Party	Uttar Pradesh	1				0		0	0
Navsarjan Bharat Party	Dadra & Nagar Haveli	1				0		0	0
National Dalitha Dhal Party	Andhra Pradesh	1				0		0	0
National Development Party	Karnataka	1				0		0	0
New Democratic Party of India	West Bengal	3				0		0	0
Navbharat Ekta Dal	Himachal Pradesh	1				0		0	0
North East India Development Party	Manipur	2				0		0	0
Nagrik Ekta Party	Uttar Pradesh	4				0		0	0
National Fifty Fifty Front	Uttar Pradesh	1				0		0	0
Naam Indiar Party	Tamil Nadu	2				0		0	0
Nationalist Janshakti Party	Uttar Pradesh	2				0		0	0
National Jagaran Party	Bihar	1				0		0	0
National Labour Party	Kerala	1				0		0	0
National Lokmat Party	Uttar Pradesh	1				0		0	0
Nationalist Justice Party	Punjab	4				0		0	0
National Nava Kranthi Party	Andhra Pradesh	1				0		0	0
Navbharat Nirman Party	Maharashtra	1				0		0	0
Nava Praja Rajyam Party	Telangana	1				0		0	0
National Republican Congress	Assam	2				0		0	0
The National Road Map Party Of India	Assam	1	2			0		0	0
The National Road Map Party Of India	NCT OF Delhi	1	2			0		0	0
Nava Samaj Party	Andhra Pradesh	1				0		0	0
Netaji Subhash Chander Bose Rashtriya Azad Party	Uttar Pradesh	1				0		0	0
Naam Tamilar Katchi	Puducherry	1	38			0		0	0
Naam Tamilar Katchi	Tamil Nadu	37	38			0		0	0
Naitik Party	Maharashtra	2	6			0		0	0
Naitik Party	Uttar Pradesh	4	6			0		0	0
Navarang Congress Party	Andhra Pradesh	3	5			0		0	0
Navarang Congress Party	Jammu & Kashmir	2	5			0		0	0
Navodayam Party	Andhra Pradesh	2				0		0	0
Navnirman Party	Haryana	1				0		0	0
Navataram Party	Andhra Pradesh	1				0		0	0
New India Party	Telangana	2				0		0	0
National Women'S Party	Madhya Pradesh	1	3			0		0	0
National Women'S Party	Telangana	1	3			0		0	0
Nawan Punjab Party	Punjab	1				0		0	0
National Youth Party	NCT OF Delhi	2				0		0	0
Odisha Pragati Dal	Odisha	1				0		0	0
Proutist Bloc, India	Bihar	1	9			0		0	0
Proutist Bloc, India	Karnataka	2	9			0		0	0
Proutist Bloc, India	Madhya Pradesh	1	9			0		0	0
Proutist Bloc, India	Maharashtra	1	9			0		0	0
Proutist Bloc, India	NCT OF Delhi	3	9			0		0	0
Proutist Bloc, India	Odisha	1	9			0		0	0
PC			3			0		0	0
Peace Party	Maharashtra	3	14			0		0	0
Peace Party	Uttar Pradesh	11	14			0		0	0
Puducherry Development Party	Puducherry	1				0		0	0
Peoples Democratic Party	Jammu & Kashmir	1	5			0		0	0
Peoples Democratic Party	Kerala	2	5			0		0	0
Party For Democratic Socialism	West Bengal	5				0		0	0
People's Party Of India(secular)	Tamil Nadu	2	3			0		0	0
People'S Union Party	Maharashtra	1				0		0	0
Punjab Ekta Party	Punjab	3	3			0		0	0
Pichhra Samaj Party	Uttar Pradesh	1				0		0	0
Prajatantra Aadhar Party	Gujarat	1				0		0	0
Prem Janata Dal	Telangana	1				0		0	0
Prahar Janshakti Party	Maharashtra	1				0		0	0
Purvanchal Janta Party (Secular)	Assam	6	14			0		0	0
Purvanchal Janta Party (Secular)	Jharkhand	1	14			0		0	0
Purvanchal Janta Party (Secular)	Karnataka	1	14			0		0	0
Purvanchal Janta Party (Secular)	Odisha	1	14			0		0	0
Purvanchal Janta Party (Secular)	Tamil Nadu	2	14			0		0	0
Purvanchal Janta Party (Secular)	West Bengal	3	14			0		0	0
Pragatisheel Lok Manch	Uttarakhand	1				0		0	0
Punjab Labour Party	Punjab	1				0		0	0
Public Mission Party	Bihar	2				0		0	0
Pragatisheel Manav Samaj Party	Uttar Pradesh	3				0		0	0
Pravasi Nivasi Party	Kerala	1				0		0	0
Peoples Party Of India (Democratic)	Bihar	9	56			0		0	0
Peoples Party Of India (Democratic)	Chhattisgarh	1	56			0		0	0
Peoples Party Of India (Democratic)	Gujarat	2	56			0		0	0
Peoples Party Of India (Democratic)	Haryana	6	56			0		0	0
Peoples Party Of India (Democratic)	Himachal Pradesh	1	56			0		0	0
Peoples Party Of India (Democratic)	Jharkhand	4	56			0		0	0
Peoples Party Of India (Democratic)	Madhya Pradesh	7	56			0		0	0
Peoples Party Of India (Democratic)	Maharashtra	6	56			0		0	0
Peoples Party Of India (Democratic)	NCT OF Delhi	5	56			0		0	0
Peoples Party Of India (Democratic)	Punjab	2	56			0		0	0
Peoples Party Of India (Democratic)	Rajasthan	2	56			0		0	0
Peoples Party Of India (Democratic)	Uttar Pradesh	8	56			0		0	0
Peoples Party Of India (Democratic)	Uttarakhand	1	56			0		0	0
People'S Party Of Arunachal	Arunachal Pradesh	2				0		0	0
Pyramid Party Of India	Andhra Pradesh	20	48			0		0	0
Pyramid Party Of India	Gujarat	2	48			0		0	0
Pyramid Party Of India	Karnataka	6	48			0		0	0
Pyramid Party Of India	NCT OF Delhi	5	48			0		0	0
Pyramid Party Of India	Punjab	1	48			0		0	0
Pyramid Party Of India	Tamil Nadu	2	48			0		0	0
Pyramid Party Of India	Telangana	11	48			0		0	0
Pyramid Party Of India	West Bengal	1	48			0		0	0
Prajatantrik Samadhan Party	Madhya Pradesh	1				0		0	0
Poorvanchal Rashtriya Congress	Madhya Pradesh	1	2			0		0	0
Poorvanchal Rashtriya Congress	Rajasthan	1	2			0		0	0
Peoples Representation For Identity And Status Of Mizoram (Prism) Party	Mizoram	1	6			0		0	0
Peoples Representation For Identity And Status Of Mizoram (Prism) Party	NCT OF Delhi	5	6			0		0	0
Prithviraj Janshakti Party	Uttar Pradesh	3				0		0	0
Prabuddha Republican Party	Maharashtra	4	5			0		0	0
Prabuddha Republican Party	Rajasthan	1	5			0		0	0
Praja Shanthi Party	Andhra Pradesh	4				0		0	0
Praja Satta Party	Karnataka	1	2			0		0	0
Praja Satta Party	Telangana	1	2			0		0	0
Pragatishil Samajwadi Party (Lohia)	Bihar	8	82			0		0	0
Pragatishil Samajwadi Party (Lohia)	Haryana	8	82			0		0	0
Pragatishil Samajwadi Party (Lohia)	Jammu & Kashmir	1	82			0		0	0
Pragatishil Samajwadi Party (Lohia)	Karnataka	2	82			0		0	0
Pragatishil Samajwadi Party (Lohia)	Madhya Pradesh	9	82			0		0	0
Pragatishil Samajwadi Party (Lohia)	Maharashtra	1	82			0		0	0
Pragatishil Samajwadi Party (Lohia)	Odisha	2	82			0		0	0
Pragatishil Samajwadi Party (Lohia)	Rajasthan	1	82			0		0	0
Pragatishil Samajwadi Party (Lohia)	Tamil Nadu	2	82			0		0	0
Pragatishil Samajwadi Party (Lohia)	Uttar Pradesh	47	82			0		0	0
Pragatishil Samajwadi Party (Lohia)	Uttarakhand	1	82			0		0	0
Pichhara Samaj Party United	Jharkhand	1	2			0		0	0
Pichhara Samaj Party United	Madhya Pradesh	1	2			0		0	0
Proutist Sarva Samaj	Bihar	1	7			0		0	0
Proutist Sarva Samaj	Jharkhand	2	7			0		0	0
Proutist Sarva Samaj	Karnataka	1	7			0		0	0
Proutist Sarva Samaj	Rajasthan	2	7			0		0	0
Proutist Sarva Samaj	Uttar Pradesh		7			0		0	0
Pragatisheel Samaj Party	Uttar Pradesh	3				0		0	0
Prajaa Swaraaj Party	Telangana	1				0		0	0
Purvanchal Mahapanchayat	Bihar	2	3			0		0	0
Purvanchal Mahapanchayat	Uttar Pradesh	1	3			0		0	0
Parivartan Samaj Party	Madhya Pradesh	1	3			0		0	0
Parivartan Samaj Party	NCT OF Delhi	1	3			0		0	0
Parivartan Samaj Party	Uttar Pradesh	1	3			0		0	0
Rashtriya Ambedkar Dal	Uttar Pradesh	1				0		0	0
Radical Democrats	Andhra Pradesh	1				0		0	0
Rashtriya Aadarsh Member Party	Madhya Pradesh	1				0		0	0
Raita Bharat Party	Karnataka	1				0		0	0
Rajnaitik Vikalp Party	Bihar	1				0		0	0
Rashtriya Ahinsa Manch	West Bengal	1				0		0	0
Rashtriya Aamjan Party	Madhya Pradesh	1				0		0	0
Rajyadhikara Party	Andhra Pradesh	1				0		0	0
Rashtrawadi Party of India,	Uttar Pradesh	2				0		0	0
Rashtriya Independent Morcha	Odisha	1				0		0	0
Rashtriya Janasachetan Party (R.J.P.)	West Bengal	5				0		0	0
Rashtriya Jansanchar Dal		1				0		0	0
Rashtriya Janta Party	Uttar Pradesh	1				0		0	0
Rashtriya Janwadi Party (Socialist)	Uttar Pradesh	1				0		0	0
Rashtriya Mahan Gantantra Party	Bihar	3				0		0	0
Rashtriya Mahila Party		1				0		0	0
Rashtriya Matadata Party	Uttar Pradesh	1				0		0	0
Rashtriya Naujawan Dal	Uttar Pradesh	1				0		0	0
Rashtriya Sahara Party	Haryana	1	3			0		0	0
Rashtriya Sahara Party	Punjab	2	3			0		0	0
Rastriya Aam Jan Seva Party	Maharashtra	1				0		0	0
Rastriya Insaaf Party	Uttar Pradesh	1				0		0	0
Rashtriya Vikas Party	Haryana	1				0		0	0
Rayalaseema Rashtra Samithi	Andhra Pradesh	1				0		0	0
Rashtriya Bahujan Congress Party	Maharashtra	1				0		0	0
Rashtriya Bhagidari Samaj Party	Haryana	1				0		0	0
Rashtriya Bharatiya Jan Jan Party	Uttar Pradesh	2				0		0	0
Rashtriya Backward Party	Uttar Pradesh	1				0		0	0
Republican Bahujan Sena	Maharashtra	1				0		0	0
Rashtriya Dal United	Bihar	1				0		0	0
Real Democracy Party	Gujarat	1				0		0	0
Rashtriya Garib Dal	Haryana	1	2			0		0	0
Rashtriya Garib Dal	Uttar Pradesh	1	2			0		0	0
Rashtriya Gondvana Party	Chhattisgarh	1				0		0	0
Rashtriya Jansena Party	Maharashtra	1				0		0	0
Rashtriya Hind Sena	Bihar	6				0		0	0
Rashtriya Jansabha Party	Chhattisgarh	7				0		0	0
Rashtriya Jan Adhikar Party	NCT OF Delhi	1	2			0		0	0
Rashtriya Jan Adhikar Party	West Bengal	1	2			0		0	0
Rashtriya Jan Adhikar Party (United)	Uttar Pradesh	2				0		0	0
Rashtriya Janadhikar Suraksha Party	West Bengal	6				0		0	0
Rashtriya Jatigat Aarakshan Virodhi Party	Haryana	1				0		0	0
Rashtriya Jantantrik Bharat Vikas Party	Uttar Pradesh	1				0		0	0
Rashtriya Jan Gaurav Party	Uttar Pradesh	1				0		0	0
Rashtriya Janhit Sangharsh Party	Manipur	1				0		0	0
Rashtriya Jankranti Party	Chandigarh	1	3			0		0	0
Rashtriya Jankranti Party	Jammu & Kashmir	1	3			0		0	0
Rashtriya Jankranti Party	Telangana	1	3			0		0	0
Rashtriya Janmat Party	Uttar Pradesh	1	2			0		0	0
Rashtriya Jansurajya Party	Maharashtra	2				0		0	0
Rashtriya Janshakti Party (Secular)	Maharashtra	2	7			0		0	0
Rashtriya Janshakti Party (Secular)	Punjab	1	7			0		0	0
Rashtriya Jansambhavna Party	Bihar	7	13			0		0	0
Rashtriya Jansambhavna Party	Karnataka	1	13			0		0	0
Rashtriya Jansambhavna Party	Maharashtra	2	13			0		0	0
Rashtriya Jansambhavna Party	NCT OF Delhi	1	13			0		0	0
Rashtriya Jansambhavna Party	Rajasthan	1	13			0		0	0
Rashtriya Jansambhavna Party	Uttar Pradesh	1	13			0		0	0
Rashtriya Jansangharsh Swaraj Party	Jharkhand	2				0		0	0
Rashtriya Janutthan Party	Uttar Pradesh	1				0		0	0
Rashtravadi Kranti Dal	Maharashtra	1				0		0	0
Rashtriya Kranti Party	Rajasthan	1	5			0		0	0
Rashtriya Kranti Party	Uttar Pradesh	4	5			0		0	0
Rashtriya Krantikari Samajwadi Party	Andhra Pradesh	1	4			0		0	0
Rashtriya Krantikari Samajwadi Party	Madhya Pradesh	1	4			0		0	0
Rashtriya Krantikari Samajwadi Party	Rajasthan	1	4			0		0	0
Rashtriya Krantikari Samajwadi Party	Uttar Pradesh	1	4			0		0	0
Rashtriya Lok Sarvadhikar Party	Uttar Pradesh	1				0		0	0
Rashtriya Lok Dal	Uttar Pradesh	3				0		0	0
Rashtriya Lokswaraj Party	Chandigarh	1	8			0		0	0
Rashtriya Lokswaraj Party	Haryana	6	8			0		0	0
Rashtriya Mazdoor Ekta Party	Haryana	1	3			0		0	0
Rashtriya Mazdoor Ekta Party	Uttar Pradesh	2	3			0		0	0
Rashtriya Mangalam Party	Rajasthan	1				0		0	0
Rashtriya Maratha Party	Maharashtra	5				0		0	0
Revolutionary Marxist Party of India	Haryana	1	2			0		0	0
Rashtra Nirman Party	Haryana	1	5			0		0	0
Rashtra Nirman Party	Madhya Pradesh	1	5			0		0	0
Rashtra Nirman Party	NCT OF Delhi	3	5			0		0	0
Rashtriya Nav Nirman Bharat Party	Gujarat	1				0		0	0
Republican Paksha (Khoripa)	Chhattisgarh	1				0		0	0
Rashtriya Praja Congress (Secular)	Andhra Pradesh	1				0		0	0
Rashtriya Pragati Party	Bihar	1				0		0	0
Republican Party Of India	Bihar	1	8			0		0	0
Republican Party Of India	Haryana	1	8			0		0	0
Republican Party Of India	Karnataka	1	8			0		0	0
Republican Party Of India	Tamil Nadu	1	8			0		0	0
Republican Party Of India	Telangana	1	8			0		0	0
Republican Party Of India	Uttar Pradesh	1	8			0		0	0
Republican Party Of India (Kamble)	Goa	1				0		0	0
Republican Party Of India (A)	Andhra Pradesh	5	33			0		0	0
Republican Party Of India (A)	Assam	3	33			0		0	0
Republican Party Of India (A)	Bihar	2	33			0		0	0
Republican Party Of India (A)	Chandigarh	3	33			0		0	0
Republican Party Of India (A)	Haryana	1	33			0		0	0
Republican Party Of India (A)	Jharkhand	2	33			0		0	0
Republican Party Of India (A)	Karnataka	3	33			0		0	0
Republican Party Of India (A)	Madhya Pradesh	4	33			0		0	0
Republican Party Of India (A)	NCT OF Delhi	5	33			0		0	0
Republican Party Of India (A)	Punjab	1	33			0		0	0
Republican Party Of India (A)	Tamil Nadu	2	33			0		0	0
Republican Party Of India (A)	Uttar Pradesh	1	33			0		0	0
Republican Party Of India (A)	West Bengal	1	33			0		0	0
Republican Party Of India (KHOBRAGADE)	Andhra Pradesh	1	2			0		0	0
Republican Party Of India (KHOBRAGADE)	Telangana	1	2			0		0	0
Republican Party of India (Reformist)	Madhya Pradesh	1	2			0		0	0
Republican Party Of India (Karnataka)	Karnataka	4				0		0	0
Republican Party of India Ektavadi	Haryana	1				0		0	0
Rashtriya Power Party	Gujarat	2	3			0		0	0
Rashtriya Power Party	Rajasthan	1	3			0		0	0
Republican Sena	Karnataka	4				0		0	0
Rashtriya Rashtrawadi Party	Bihar	1	7			0		0	0
Rashtriya Rashtrawadi Party	Haryana	1	7			0		0	0
Rashtriya Rashtrawadi Party	Madhya Pradesh	1	7			0		0	0
Rashtriya Rashtrawadi Party	NCT OF Delhi	3	7			0		0	0
Rashtriya Rashtrawadi Party	Rajasthan	1	7			0		0	0
Rashtriya Apna Dal	Madhya Pradesh	1	2			0		0	0
Rashtriya Apna Dal	Uttar Pradesh	1	2			0		0	0
Rashtrawadi Shramjeevi Dal	Uttar Pradesh	1				0		0	0
Rashtriya Sangail Party	Jharkhand	1				0		0	0
Rashtriya Sahyog Party	Bihar	1				0		0	0
Rashtriya Samaj Paksha	Gujarat	1	12			0		0	0
Rashtriya Samaj Paksha	Karnataka	2	12			0		0	0
Rashtriya Samaj Paksha	Kerala	1	12			0		0	0
Rashtriya Samaj Paksha	Madhya Pradesh	1	12			0		0	0
Rashtriya Samaj Paksha	Punjab	1	12			0		0	0
Rashtriya Samaj Paksha	Uttar Pradesh	6	12			0		0	0
Rashtriya Samanta Dal	Uttar Pradesh	2				0		0	0
Rashtriya Samrasta Party	NCT OF Delhi	3				0		0	0
Rashtriya Samta Party (Secular)	Bihar	4	5			0		0	0
Rashtriya Samta Party (Secular)	Jharkhand	1	5			0		0	0
Rashtravadi Party (Bharat)	Uttar Pradesh	1				0		0	0
Revolutionary Socialist Party Of India(Marxist)		1				0		0	0
Rashtriya Samajwadi Party (Secular)	Gujarat	1	2			0		0	0
Rashtriya Samajwadi Party (Secular)	Maharashtra	1	2			0		0	0
Rashtra Sewa Dal	Bihar	1				0		0	0
Rashtriya Shoshit Samaj Party	Madhya Pradesh	2	7			0		0	0
Rashtriya Shoshit Samaj Party	Uttar Pradesh	5	7			0		0	0
Rashtriya Samta Vikas Party	Rajasthan	1				0		0	0
Rashtriya Sarvjan Vikas Party	Bihar	2				0		0	0
Rashtriya Azad Manch	Himachal Pradesh	2				0		0	0
Rashtriya Janvikas Party (Democratic)	Bihar	1				0		0	0
Right to Recall Party	Gujarat	4	14			0		0	0
Right to Recall Party	Jharkhand	1	14			0		0	0
Right to Recall Party	Karnataka	1	14			0		0	0
Right to Recall Party	Madhya Pradesh	1	14			0		0	0
Right to Recall Party	Maharashtra	1	14			0		0	0
Right to Recall Party	NCT OF Delhi	2	14			0		0	0
Right to Recall Party	Rajasthan	3	14			0		0	0
Right to Recall Party	Uttar Pradesh	1	14			0		0	0
Rashtriya Ulama Council	Bihar	1	10			0		0	0
Rashtriya Ulama Council	Maharashtra	4	10			0		0	0
Rashtriya Ulama Council	Uttar Pradesh	5	10			0		0	0
Rashtravadi Janata Party	Bihar	2	4			0		0	0
Rashtravadi Janata Party	West Bengal	2	4			0		0	0
Rashtriya Viklang Party	Uttar Pradesh	1				0		0	0
Rashtriya Vyapari Party	Uttar Pradesh	1				0		0	0
Rashtra Vikas Zumbes Party	Gujarat	1				0		0	0
Rashtrawadi Chetna Party		1				0		0	0
Sathi Aur Aapka Faisala Party	Bihar	2				0		0	0
Shiromani Akali Dal (Amritsar)(Simranjit Singh Mann)	Punjab	2				0		0	0
Samaj Adhikar Kalyan Party	Chandigarh	1	6			0		0	0
Samaj Adhikar Kalyan Party	Punjab	5	6			0		0	0
Samajwadi Samaj Party	Uttar Pradesh	1				0		0	0
Sabse Achchhi Party	Uttar Pradesh	2				0		0	0
Sarvshreshth Dal	Uttar Pradesh	1				0		0	0
Saman Aadmi Saman Party	Madhya Pradesh	1				0		0	0
Sabka Dal United	Uttar Pradesh	3				0		0	0
Swatantra Bharat Paksha	Maharashtra	3				0		0	0
Sabhi Jan Party	Uttar Pradesh	2				0		0	0
Samaj Bhalai Morcha		1				0		0	0
Swarna Bharat Party	Assam	1	3			0		0	0
Swarna Bharat Party	Maharashtra	1	3			0		0	0
Swarna Bharat Party	Rajasthan	1	3			0		0	0
Suheldev Bharatiya Samaj Party	Bihar	5	24			0		0	0
Suheldev Bharatiya Samaj Party	Uttar Pradesh	19	24			0		0	0
Socialist Party (India)	Madhya Pradesh	1	3			0		0	0
Socialist Party (India)	Punjab	1	3			0		0	0
Socialist Party (India)	Uttar Pradesh	1	3			0		0	0
Shiromani Akali Dal (Taksali)	Punjab	1				0		0	0
Secular Democratic Congress	Karnataka	1	4			0		0	0
Secular Democratic Congress	Kerala	2	4			0		0	0
Secular Democratic Congress	Telangana	1	4			0		0	0
Social Democratic Party Of India	Andhra Pradesh	1	14			0		0	0
Social Democratic Party Of India	Karnataka	1	14			0		0	0
Social Democratic Party Of India	Kerala	10	14			0		0	0
Social Democratic Party Of India	Tamil Nadu	1	14			0		0	0
Social Democratic Party Of India	West Bengal	1	14			0		0	0
Samajwadi Forward Bloc	Andhra Pradesh	1	11			0		0	0
Samajwadi Forward Bloc	Karnataka	1	11			0		0	0
Samajwadi Forward Bloc	Kerala	1	11			0		0	0
Samajwadi Forward Bloc	Maharashtra	1	11			0		0	0
Samajwadi Forward Bloc	Tamil Nadu	1	11			0		0	0
Samajwadi Forward Bloc	Telangana	6	11			0		0	0
Saaf Party	Uttar Pradesh	2				0		0	0
Sangharsh Sena	Maharashtra	1				0		0	0
Shane Hind Fourm	Uttar Pradesh	1				0		0	0
Shiromani Akali Dal(Taksali)		1				0		0	0
Shri Janta Party	Madhya Pradesh	1				0		0	0
Smart Indians Party	Madhya Pradesh	4				0		0	0
Samajwadi Janata Dal Democratic	Bihar	1				0		0	0
Samajwadi Jan Parishad	West Bengal	1				0		0	0
Swatantra Jantaraj Party	Madhya Pradesh	1	9			0		0	0
Swatantra Jantaraj Party	Uttar Pradesh	8	9			0		0	0
Samajwadi Janata Party(Karnataka)	Karnataka	1				0		0	0
Social Justice Party Of India	Telangana	3				0		0	0
Sajag Samaj Party	Uttar Pradesh	1				0		0	0
Sanjhi Virasat Party	NCT OF Delhi	1				0		0	0
Sankhyanupati Bhagidari Party	Bihar	2				0		0	0
Samata Kranti Dal	Odisha	1				0		0	0
Satya Kranti Party	Uttar Pradesh	1				0		0	0
Shiromani Lok Dal Party		1				0		0	0
Sarvjan Lok Shakti Party	Uttar Pradesh	2				0		0	0
Samrat Ashok Sena Party	Uttar Pradesh	1				0		0	0
Samajik Nyaya Party	Haryana	2				0		0	0
Samta Vikas Party	Madhya Pradesh	1				0		0	0
Socialist Janata Party	NCT OF Delhi	1				0		0	0
Swaraj Party (Loktantrik)	Bihar	2				0		0	0
Sapaks Party	Bihar	1	12			0		0	0
Sapaks Party	Haryana	1	12			0		0	0
Sapaks Party	Madhya Pradesh	10	12			0		0	0
Samajtantric Party Of India	West Bengal	1				0		0	0
Samaanya Praja Party	Andhra Pradesh	1				0		0	0
Sarvadharam Party (MADHYA PRADESH)	Chhattisgarh	1	2			0		0	0
Sarvadharam Party (MADHYA PRADESH)	Madhya Pradesh	1	2			0		0	0
Sanman Rajkiya Paksha	Maharashtra	1				0		0	0
Sikkim Republican Party	Sikkim	1				0		0	0
Sarvodaya Prabhat Party	NCT OF Delhi	1				0		0	0
Shakti Sena (Bharat Desh)	Chhattisgarh	1				0		0	0
Shoshit Samaj Dal	Bihar	7				0		0	0
Samata Samadhan Party	Madhya Pradesh	1				0		0	0
Samdarshi Samaj Party	Uttar Pradesh	2				0		0	0
Sanatan Sanskriti Raksha Dal	Madhya Pradesh	1	7			0		0	0
Sanatan Sanskriti Raksha Dal	Maharashtra	2	7			0		0	0
Sanatan Sanskriti Raksha Dal	NCT OF Delhi	3	7			0		0	0
Sanatan Sanskriti Raksha Dal	Uttar Pradesh	1	7			0		0	0
Satya Bahumat Party	Himachal Pradesh	1	7			0		0	0
Satya Bahumat Party	NCT OF Delhi	3	7			0		0	0
Satya Bahumat Party	Rajasthan	2	7			0		0	0
Satya Bahumat Party	Uttar Pradesh	1	7			0		0	0
Subhashwadi Bhartiya Samajwadi Party (Subhas Party)	Uttar Pradesh	3				0		0	0
Socialist Unity Centre Of India (COMMUNIST)	Andhra Pradesh	2	114			0		0	0
Socialist Unity Centre Of India (COMMUNIST)	Assam	6	114			0		0	0
Socialist Unity Centre Of India (COMMUNIST)	Bihar	8	114			0		0	0
Socialist Unity Centre Of India (COMMUNIST)	Chhattisgarh	2	114			0		0	0
Socialist Unity Centre Of India (COMMUNIST)	Gujarat	2	114			0		0	0
Socialist Unity Centre Of India (COMMUNIST)	Haryana	4	114			0		0	0
Socialist Unity Centre Of India (COMMUNIST)	Jharkhand	5	114			0		0	0
Socialist Unity Centre Of India (COMMUNIST)	Karnataka	7	114			0		0	0
Socialist Unity Centre Of India (COMMUNIST)	Kerala	9	114			0		0	0
Socialist Unity Centre Of India (COMMUNIST)	Madhya Pradesh	3	114			0		0	0
Socialist Unity Centre Of India (COMMUNIST)	Maharashtra	1	114			0		0	0
Socialist Unity Centre Of India (COMMUNIST)	NCT OF Delhi	1	114			0		0	0
Socialist Unity Centre Of India (COMMUNIST)	Odisha	8	114			0		0	0
Socialist Unity Centre Of India (COMMUNIST)	Puducherry	1	114			0		0	0
Socialist Unity Centre Of India (COMMUNIST)	Punjab	1	114			0		0	0
Socialist Unity Centre Of India (COMMUNIST)	Rajasthan	1	114			0		0	0
Socialist Unity Centre Of India (COMMUNIST)	Tamil Nadu	4	114			0		0	0
Socialist Unity Centre Of India (COMMUNIST)	Telangana	2	114			0		0	0
Socialist Unity Centre Of India (COMMUNIST)	Tripura	1	114			0		0	0
Socialist Unity Centre Of India (COMMUNIST)	Uttar Pradesh	3	114			0		0	0
Socialist Unity Centre Of India (COMMUNIST)	Uttarakhand	1	114			0		0	0
Socialist Unity Centre Of India (COMMUNIST)	West Bengal	42	114			0		0	0
Sikkim United Front (SUF)	Sikkim	1				0		0	0
Sunder Samaj Party	Chhattisgarh	1				0		0	0
Samagra Utthan Party	Bihar	1	7			0		0	0
Samagra Utthan Party	Madhya Pradesh	5	7			0		0	0
Samagra Utthan Party	Uttar Pradesh	1	7			0		0	0
Svatantra Bharat Satyagrah Party	Gujarat	2				0		0	0
Sarvodaya Bharat Party	Chhattisgarh	1	8			0		0	0
Sarvodaya Bharat Party	Gujarat	1	8			0		0	0
Sarvodaya Bharat Party	Madhya Pradesh	1	8			0		0	0
Sarvodaya Bharat Party	Maharashtra	2	8			0		0	0
Sarvodaya Bharat Party	Uttar Pradesh	3	8			0		0	0
Sarva Janata Party	Karnataka	3				0		0	0
Sarv Vikas Party	Uttarakhand	1				0		0	0
Sardar Vallabhbhai Patel Party	Gujarat	4				0		0	0
Sarvjan Sewa Party	Chandigarh	1	2			0		0	0
Sarvjan Sewa Party	Punjab	1	2			0		0	0
Swarnim Bharat Inquilab	Madhya Pradesh	1				0		0	0
Swabhiman Party	Chhattisgarh	1	3			0		0	0
Swabhiman Party	Himachal Pradesh	2	3			0		0	0
Swatantra Samaj Party	Bihar	1				0		0	0
Sanyukt Vikas Party	Bihar	1	6			0		0	0
Sanyukt Vikas Party	Gujarat	3	6			0		0	0
Sanyukt Vikas Party	NCT OF Delhi	1	6			0		0	0
Sanyukt Vikas Party	Uttar Pradesh	1	6			0		0	0
Tamil Nadu Ilangyar Katchi	Tamil Nadu	16				0		0	0
Telangana Communist Party Of India	Telangana	1				0		0	0
The Future India Party	Tamil Nadu	1				0		0	0
Telangana Jana Samithi	Telangana	2				0		0	0
Tamil Maanila Congress (MOOPANAR)	Tamil Nadu	1				0		0	0
Tamizhaga Murpokku Makkal Katchi	Tamil Nadu	1				0		0	0
Tola Party	Haryana	1				0		0	0
Telangana Prajala Party	Telangana	1				0		0	0
Telangana Sakalajanula Party	Telangana	1				0		0	0
Tamil Telugu National Party	Tamil Nadu	1				0		0	0
Telangana Yuva Shakti	Telangana	1				0		0	0
Tripura Peoples Party	Tripura	1				0		0	0
Universal Brotherhood Movement	Tamil Nadu	1				0		0	0
United Democratic Front Secular	Uttar Pradesh	1				0		0	0
United Democratic Party	Meghalaya	1				0		0	0
Uttarakhand Kranti Dal	Uttarakhand	4				0		0	0
Uttarakhand Kranti Dal (Democratic)	Uttarakhand	4				0		0	0
Uttarakhand Parivartan Party	Uttarakhand	1				0		0	0
Ulzaipali Makkal Katchy	Tamil Nadu	6				0		0	0
United People's Party, Liberia	Assam	2				0		0	0
Uttarakhand Pragatisheel Party	NCT OF Delhi	1	2			0		0	0
Uttarakhand Pragatisheel Party	Uttarakhand	1	2			0		0	0
Uttar Pradesh Navnirman Sena	Jharkhand	1				0		0	0
Uttama Prajaakeeya Party	Karnataka	27				0		0	0
United States Of India Party	Tamil Nadu	1				0		0	0
Vanchit Bahujan Aaghadi	Maharashtra	46				0		0	0
Vikassheel Insaan Party	Bihar	4				0		0	0
Vishwa Jana Party	Andhra Pradesh	2				0		0	0
Vishwa Manav Samaj Kalyan Parishad	Uttar Pradesh	1				0		0	0
Vikas Insaf Party	Uttar Pradesh	2				0		0	0
Vivasayigal Makkal Munnetra Katchi	Tamil Nadu	1				0		0	0
Voters Party International	Assam	7	20			0		0	0
Voters Party International	Bihar	6	20			0		0	0
Voters Party International	Jharkhand	1	20			0		0	0
Voters Party International	NCT OF Delhi	1	20			0		0	0
Voters Party International	Uttar Pradesh	5	20			0		0	0
Vyavastha Parivartan Party	Gujarat	4				0		0	0
Vanchitsamaj Insaaf Party	Uttar Pradesh	3				0		0	0
Vishva Shakti Party	Jharkhand	2	3			0		0	0
Vishva Shakti Party	Madhya Pradesh	1	3			0		0	0
Vanchit Samaj Party	Bihar	4				0		0	0
Voters Party	Haryana	2				0		0	0
Wazib Adhikar Party	Bihar	1				0		0	0
Welfare Party Of India	West Bengal	2				0		0	0
Yuva Jan Jagriti Party	Gujarat	6				0		0	0
Yuva Krantikari Party	Bihar	4				0		0	0
Yekikrutha Sankshema Rashtriya Praja Party	Telangana	1				0		0	0
Yuva Sarkar	Gujarat	2				0		0	0
Yuva Vikas Party	Uttar Pradesh	1				0		0	0

== Voter statistics ==
According to the ECI, 900 million people were eligible to vote, with an increase of 84.3 million voters since the last election in 2014, making it the largest-ever election in the world. 15 million voters aged 18–19 years became eligible to vote for the first time. 468 million eligible voters were males, 432 million were females and 38,325 identified themselves belonging to third gender. Total 71,735 overseas voters also enrolled.

The residents of the former enclaves exchanged under the 2015 India-Bangladesh boundary agreement voted for the first time.

=== Electronic voting machines and security ===
The ECI deployed a total of 1.74 million voter-verified paper audit trail (VVPAT) units and 3.96 million electronic voting machines (EVM) in 1,035,918 polling stations. Approximately 270,000 paramilitary and 2 million state police personnel provided organisational support and security at various polling booths. On 9 April 2019, the Supreme Court ordered the ECI to increase VVPAT slips vote count to five randomly selected EVMs per assembly constituency, which meant that the ECI had to count VVPAT slips of 20,625 EVMs before it could certify the final election results.

=== Voting ===
In the first phase, 69.58 per cent of the 142 million eligible voters cast their vote to elect their representatives for 91 Lok Sabha seats. The voter turnout was 68.77 per cent in the same constituencies in the 2014 general elections. In the second phase, 156 million voters were eligible to vote for 95 Lok Sabha seats and the turnout was 69.45 per cent, compared to 69.62 per cent in 2014. For the third phase, 189 million voters were eligible to elect 116 Lok Sabha representatives. According to ECI, the turnout for this phase was 68.40 per cent, compared to 67.15 per cent in 2014. In the fourth of seven phases, 65.50 per cent of the 128 million eligible voters cast their vote to elect 72 representatives to the Indian parliament while the turnout for the same seats in the 2014 election was 63.05 per cent. The fifth phase was open to 87.5 million eligible voters, who could cast their vote in over 96,000 polling booths. In the sixth phase, 64.40 per cent of the 101 million eligible voters cast their vote in about 113,000 polling stations.

== Turnout ==
The final turnout stood at 67.11 per cent, the highest ever turnout recorded in any of the general elections till date. The percentage is 1.16 per cent higher than the 2014 elections whose turnout stood at 65.95 per cent. Over 600 million voters polled their votes in 2019 Indian General elections.

=== Phase-wise voter turnout details ===
State/UT	Total		Voter turnout by phase (Note: ▲/▼ indicate change from the 2014 elections.)													
State/UT	Total		Phase 1 11 April		Phase 2 18 April		Phase 3 23 April		Phase 4 29 April		Phase 5 6 May		Phase 6 12 May		Phase 7 19 May	
State/UT	Seats	Turnout (%)	Seats	Turnout (%)	Seats	Turnout (%)	Seats	Turnout (%)	Seats	Turnout (%)	Seats	Turnout (%)	Seats	Turnout (%)	Seats	Turnout (%)
Andhra Pradesh	25	79.70 ▲	25	79.70 ▲	–	–	–	–	–	–	–	–	–	–	–	–
Arunachal Pradesh	2	78.47 ▲	2	78.47 ▲	–	–	–	–	–	–	–	–	–	–	–	–
Assam	14	81.52 ▲	5	78.27 ▼	5	81.19 ▲	4	85.11 ▲	–	–	–	–	–	–	–	–
Bihar	40	57.33 ▲	4	53.44 ▲	5	62.92 ▲	5	61.21 ▲	5	59.18 ▲	5	57.08 ▲	8	58.48▲	8	51.38
Chhattisgarh	11	71.48 ▲	1	66.04 ▲	3	74.95 ▲	7	70.73 ▲	–	–	–	–	–	–	–	–
Goa	2	74.94 ▼	–	–	–	–	2	74.94 ▼	–	–	–	–	–	–	–	–
Gujarat	26	64.11 ▲	–	–	–	–	26	64.11 ▲	–	–	–	–	–	–	–	–
Haryana	10	70.34▼	–	–	–	–	–	–	–	–	–	–	10	70.34▼	–	–
Himachal Pradesh	4	70.22	–	–	–	–	–	–	–	–	–	–	–	–	4	70.22▲
Jammu and Kashmir (Note: Polling in Anantnag was scheduled over three days.)	6	44.97 ▼	2	57.38 ▲	2	45.66 ▼	1/3	13.68 ▼	1/3	10.32 ▼	1 1/3	19.92 ▼	–	–	–	–
Jharkhand	14	66.80 ▲	–	–	–	–	–	–	3	64.97 ▲	4	65.99 ▲	4	65.42▲	3	55.59
Karnataka	28	68.63 ▲	–	–	14	68.80 ▲	14	68.47 ▲	–	–	–	–	–	–	–	–
Kerala	20	77.67 ▲	–	–	–	–	20	77.67 ▲	–	–	–	–	–	–	–	–
Madhya Pradesh	29	71.10 ▲	–	–	–	–	–	–	6	74.90 ▲	7	69.14 ▲	8	65.24 ▲	8	75.64 ▲
Maharashtra	48	60.79 ▲	7	63.04 ▼	10	62.85 ▲	14	62.36 ▼	17	57.33 ▲	–	–	–	–	–	–
Manipur	2	82.75 ▲	1	84.20 ▼	1	81.24 ▲	–	–	–	–	–	–	–	–	–	–
Meghalaya	2	71.43 ▲	2	71.43 ▲	–	–	–	–	–	–	–	–	–	–	–	–
Mizoram	1	63.12 ▲	1	63.12 ▲	–	–	–	–	–	–	–	–	–	–	–	–
Nagaland	1	83.09 ▼	1	83.09 ▼	–	–	–	–	–	–	–	–	–	–	–	–
Odisha	21	73.06 ▼	4	73.82 ▼	5	72.56 ▲	6	71.62 ▼	6	74.38 ▼	–	–	–	–	–	–
Punjab	13	65.96	–	–	–	–	–	–	–	–	–	–	–	–	13	65.96▼
Rajasthan	25	66.34 ▲	–	–	–	–	–	–	13	68.17 ▲	12	63.71 ▲	–	–	–	–
Sikkim	1	78.81 ▼	1	78.81 ▼	–	–	–	–	–	–	–	–	–	–	–	–
Tamil Nadu (Note: Tamil Nadu has 39 constituencies. Polling in Vellore was cancelled and later held on 5 August 2019.)	38	72.02 ▼	–	–	38	72.02 ▼	–	–	–	–	–	–	–	–	–	–
Telangana	17	62.71	17	62.71	–	–	–	–	–	–	–	–	–	–	–	–
Tripura	2	83.20 ▼	1	83.21 ▼	–	–	1	83.19 ▲	–	–	–	–	–	–	–	–
Uttar Pradesh	80	59.21 ▲	8	63.92 ▼	8	62.46 ▲	10	61.42 ▼	13	59.11 ▲	14	58.00 ▲	14	54.44	13	47.82
Uttarakhand	5	61.48 ▼	5	61.48 ▼	–	–	–	–	–	–	–	–	–	–	–	–
West Bengal	42	81.76 ▼	2	83.80 ▲	3	81.72 ▲	5	81.97 ▼	8	82.84 ▼	7	80.09 ▼	8	84.50	9	78.73
Andaman and Nicobar Islands	1	65.08 ▼	1	65.08 ▼	–	–	–	–	–	–	–	–	–	–	–	–
Chandigarh	1	70.62	–	–	–	–	–	–	–	–	–	–	–	–	1	70.62
Dadra and Nagar Haveli	1	79.59 ▼	–	–	–	–	1	79.59 ▼	–	–	–	–	–	–	–	–
Daman and Diu	1	71.83 ▼	–	–	–	–	1	71.83 ▼	–	–	–	–	–	–	–	–
Delhi	7	60.51▼	–	–	–	–	–	–	–	–	–	–	7	60.51▼	–	–
Lakshadweep	1	84.96 ▼	1	84.96 ▼	–	–	–	–	–	–	–	–	–	–	–	–
Puducherry	1	81.21 ▼	–	–	1	81.21 ▼	–	–	–	–	–	–	–	–	–	–
Total	542	67.11 ▲	91	69.58 ▲	95	69.45 ▼	116 1/3	68.40▲	71 1/3	65.50 ▲	50 1/3	64.16 ▲	59	64.40	59	61.71

=== State/UT-wise voter turnout details ===
State/UT	Total electors	Total voters	Total turnout	Total seats
Andaman & Nicobar Islands (UT)	318,471	207,398	65.12%	1
Andhra Pradesh	39,405,967	31,674,526	80.38%	25
Arunachal Pradesh	803,563	659,766	82.11%	2
Assam	22,050,059	17,992,753	81.60%	14
Bihar	71,216,290	40,830,453	57.33%	40
Chandigarh (UT)	646,729	456,637	70.61%	1
Chhattisgarh	19,016,462	13,622,625	71.64%	11
Dadra & Nagar Haveli (UT)	250,029	198,984	79.58%	1
Daman & Diu (UT)	121,740	87,473	71.85%	1
Goa	1,136,113	853,724	75.14%	2
Gujarat	45,152,373	29,128,364	64.51%	26
Haryana	18,057,010	12,701,029	70.34%	10
Himachal Pradesh	5,330,154	3,859,940	72.42%	4
Jammu & Kashmir	7,922,538	3,562,744	44.97%	6
Jharkhand	22,404,856	14,966,781	66.80%	14
Karnataka	51,094,530	35,159,448	68.81%	28
Kerala	26,204,836	20,397,168	77.84%	20
Lakshadweep (UT)	55,189	47,026	85.21%	1
Madhya Pradesh	51,867,474	36,928,342	71.20%	29
Maharashtra	88,676,946	54,111,038	61.02%	48
Manipur	1,959,563	1,620,451	82.69%	2
Meghalaya	1,914,796	1,367,759	71.43%	2
Mizoram	792,464	500,347	63.14%	1
Nagaland	1,213,777	1,007,437	83.00%	1
NCT of Delhi	14,327,649	8,682,366	60.60%	7
Odisha	32,497,762	23,817,169	73.29%	21
Puducherry (UT)	973,410	790,895	81.25%	1
Punjab	20,892,673	13,777,295	65.94%	13
Rajasthan	48,955,813	32,476,481	66.34%	25
Sikkim	434,128	353,415	81.41%	1
Tamil Nadu	59,941,832	43,419,753	72.44%	39
Telangana	29,708,615	18,646,856	62.77%	17
Tripura	2,614,718	2,154,550	82.40%	2
Uttar Pradesh	146,134,603	86,531,972	59.21%	80
Uttarakhand	7,856,318	4,861,415	61.88%	5
West Bengal	70,001,284	57,230,018	81.76%	42
India	911,950,734	614,684,398	67.40%	543

== Surveys and polls ==
=== Opinion polls ===
Number of seats projected in opinion polls per alliance over time.

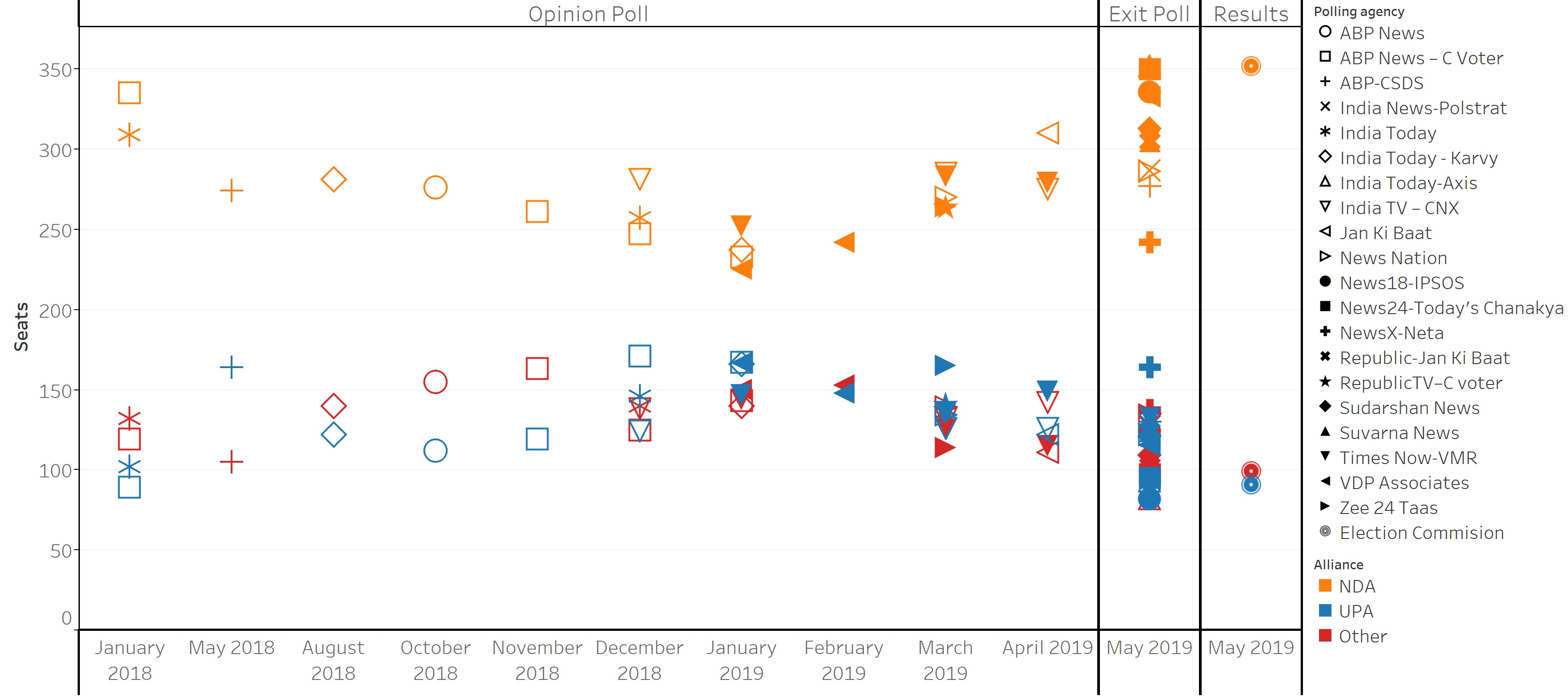
Indian General Election Trends - 2019

Various organisations carried out opinion polling to gauge voting intentions in India. The results of such polls are displayed in this list. The date range for these opinion polls is from the previous general election, held in April and May 2014, to the present day. The ECI banned the release of exit polls from 11 April to 19 May, the last phase of the elections. The commission also banned the publication or broadcast in the media of predictions made by astrologers and tarot card readers.

Poll type	Date published	Polling agency			Others	Majority	Ref
Poll type	Date published	Polling agency	NDA	UPA	Others	Majority	Ref
Opinion polls	8 April 2019	Times Now-VMR	279	149	115	7	
Opinion polls	6 April 2019	India TV-CNX	275	126	142	3	
Opinion polls	Mar 2019	Times Now-VMR	283	135	125	11	
Opinion polls	Mar 2019	News Nation	270	134	139	Hung	
Opinion polls	Mar 2019	CVoter	264	141	138	Hung	
Opinion polls	Mar 2019	India TV-CNX	285	126	132	13	
Opinion polls	Mar 2019	Zee 24 Taas	264	165	114	Hung	
Opinion polls	Feb 2019	VDP Associates	242	148	153	Hung	
Opinion polls	Jan 2019	Times Now-VMR	252	147	144	Hung	
Opinion polls	Jan 2019	ABP News-CVoter	233	167	143	Hung	
Opinion polls	Jan 2019	India Today-Karvy	237	166	140	Hung	
Opinion polls	Jan 2019	VDP Associates	225	167	150	Hung	
Opinion polls	Dec 2018	India Today	257	146	140	Hung	
Opinion polls	Dec 2018	ABP News-CVoter	247	171	125	Hung	
Opinion polls	Dec 2018	India TV-CNX	281	124	138	9	
Opinion polls	Nov 2018	ABP News-CVoter	261	119	163	Hung	
Opinion polls	Oct 2018	ABP News	276	112	155	4	
Opinion polls	Aug 2018	India Today-Karvy	281	122	140	9	
Opinion polls	May 2018	ABP News-CSDS	274	164	105	2	
Opinion polls	Jan 2018	CVoter	335	89	119	63	
Opinion polls	Jan 2018	India Today	309	102	132	37	

=== Exit polls ===
Poll type	Date published	Polling agency			Others	Majority	Ref
Poll type	Date published	Polling agency	NDA	UPA	Others	Majority	Ref
Exit polls		India Today-Axis	352 ± 13	93 ± 15	82 ± 13	70 ± 13	
Exit polls		News24-Today's Chanakya	350 ± 14	95 ± 9	97 ± 11	68 ± 14	
Exit polls		News18-IPSOS; CNN-IBN-IPSOS	336	82	124	64	
Exit polls		VDP Associates	333	115	94	61	
Exit polls		Sudarshan News	313	121	109	41	
Exit polls		Times Now-VMR	306 ± 3	132 ± 3	104 ± 3	34 ± 3	
Exit polls		Suvarna News	305	124	102	33	
Exit polls		India TV-CNX	300 ± 10	120 ± 5	122 ± 6	28 ± 10	
Exit polls		India News-Polstrat	287	128	127	15	
Exit polls		CVoter	287	128	127	15	
Exit polls		News Nation	286	122	134	14	
Exit polls		ABP-CSDS	277	130	135	5	
Exit polls		NewsX-Neta	242	164	137	Hung	

== Results ==
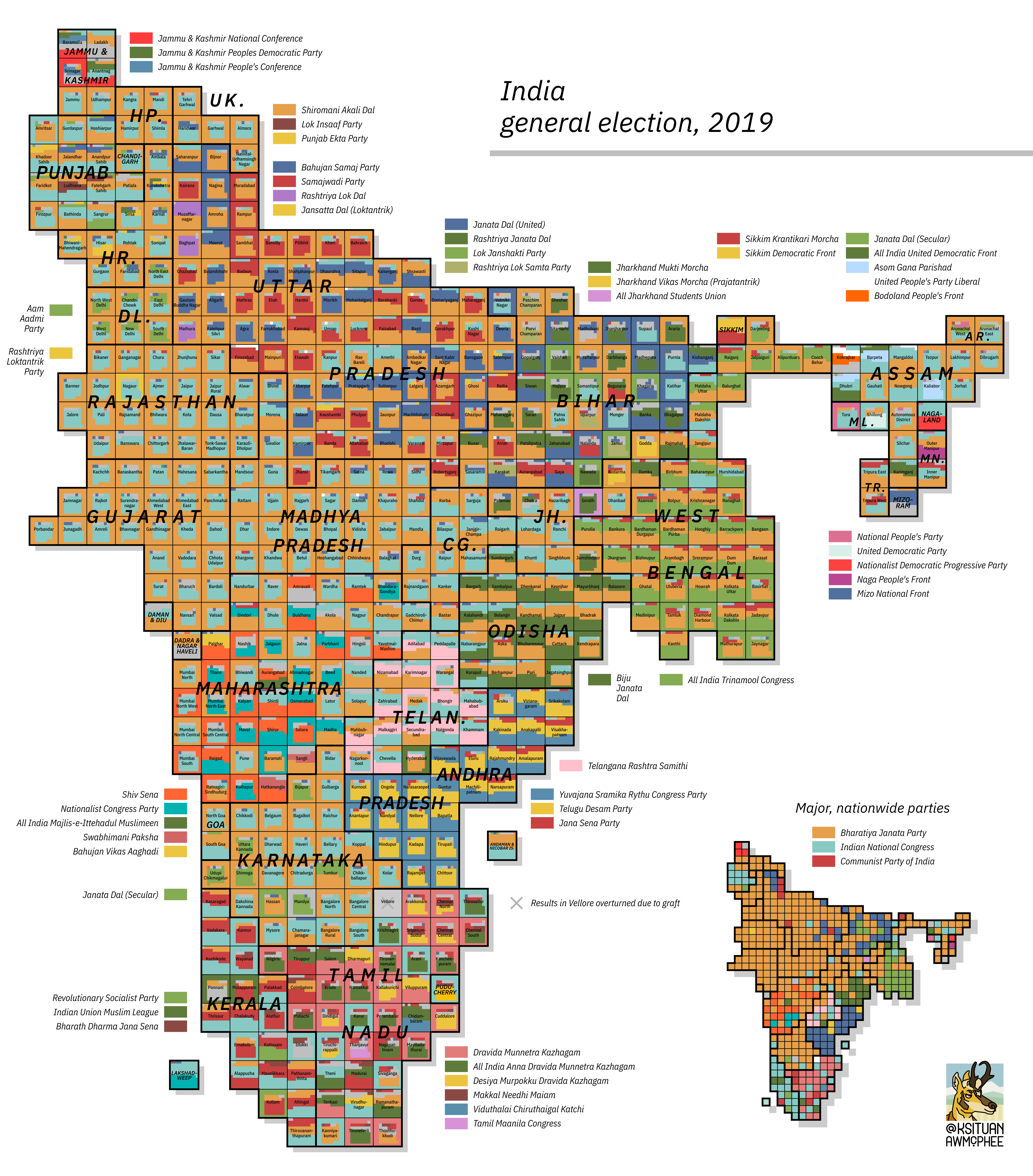
A cartogram showing the popular vote in each constituency.

Seat share of parties in the election
1. BJP (55.8%)
2. INC (9.57%)
3. DMK (4.41%)
4. AITC (4.05%)
5. YSRCP (4.05%)
6. SS (3.31%)
7. JD(U) (2.95%)
8. BJD (2.21%)
9. BSP (1.84%)
10. TRS (1.66%)
11. Other (10.2%)
Vote share of parties in the election
1. BJP (37.7%)
2. INC (19.7%)
3. AITC (4.10%)
4. BSP (3.66%)
5. SP (2.55%)
6. YSRCP (2.53%)
7. DMK (2.26%)
8. SS (2.10%)
9. TDP (2.04%)
10. CPI(M) (1.77%)
11. Other (21.6%)

Party	Votes	%	Seats	+/–
Bharatiya Janata Party	229,076,879	37.30	303	+21
Indian National Congress	119,495,214	19.46	52	+8
Trinamool Congress	24,929,330	4.06	22	–12
Bahujan Samaj Party	22,246,501	3.62	10	+10
Samajwadi Party	15,647,206	2.55	5	0
YSR Congress Party	15,537,006	2.53	22	+13
Dravida Munnetra Kazhagam	14,363,332	2.34	24	+24
Shiv Sena	12,858,904	2.09	18	0
Telugu Desam Party	12,515,345	2.04	3	–13
Communist Party of India (Marxist)	10,744,908	1.75	3	–6
Biju Janata Dal	10,174,021	1.66	12	–8
Janata Dal (United)	8,926,679	1.45	16	+14
Nationalist Congress Party	8,500,331	1.38	5	–1
All India Anna Dravida Munnetra Kazhagam	8,307,345	1.35	1	–36
Telangana Rashtra Samithi	7,696,848	1.25	9	–2
Rashtriya Janata Dal	6,632,247	1.08	0	–4
Shiromani Akali Dal	3,778,574	0.62	2	–2
Vanchit Bahujan Aaghadi	3,743,560	0.61	0	New
Communist Party of India	3,576,184	0.58	2	+1
Janata Dal (Secular)	3,457,107	0.56	1	–1
Lok Janshakti Party	3,206,979	0.52	6	0
Aam Aadmi Party	2,716,629	0.44	1	–3
Pattali Makkal Katchi	2,297,431	0.37	0	–1
Jana Sena Party	1,915,127	0.31	0	New
Jharkhand Mukti Morcha	1,901,976	0.31	1	–1
Naam Tamilar Katchi	1,695,074	0.28	0	New
Makkal Needhi Maiam	1,613,708	0.26	0	New
Indian Union Muslim League	1,592,467	0.26	3	+1
Asom Gana Parishad	1,480,697	0.24	0	0
Rashtriya Lok Samta Party	1,462,518	0.24	0	–3
Rashtriya Lok Dal	1,447,363	0.24	0	0
All India United Democratic Front	1,402,088	0.23	1	–2
All India Majlis-e-Ittehadul Muslimeen	1,201,542	0.20	2	+1
Apna Dal (Sonelal)	1,039,478	0.17	2	New
Hindustani Awam Morcha (Secular)	956,501	0.16	0	New
Desiya Murpokku Dravida Kazhagam	929,590	0.15	0	0
Swabhimani Paksha	834,380	0.14	0	–1
Jharkhand Vikas Morcha (Prajatantrik)	750,799	0.12	0	0
Communist Party of India (Marxist–Leninist) Liberation	711,715	0.12	0	0
Revolutionary Socialist Party	709,685	0.12	1	0
Vikassheel Insaan Party	660,706	0.11	0	New
Rashtriya Loktantrik Party	660,051	0.11	1	New
All Jharkhand Students Union	648,277	0.11	1	+1
Jannayak Janta Party	619,970	0.10	0	New
Bharatiya Tribal Party	539,319	0.09	0	New
Viduthalai Chiruthaigal Katchi	507,643	0.08	1	+1
Nationalist Democratic Progressive Party	500,510	0.08	1	New
Bahujan Vikas Aaghadi	491,596	0.08	0	0
Lok Insaaf Party	469,784	0.08	0	New
Bodoland People's Front	446,774	0.07	0	0
National People's Party	425,986	0.07	1	0
Kerala Congress (M)	421,046	0.07	1	0
United People's Party Liberal	416,305	0.07	0	New
Bahujan Mukti Party	405,949	0.07	0	0
Socialist Unity Centre of India (Communist)	403,835	0.07	0	0
Ambedkarite Party of India	381,070	0.06	0	0
Bharath Dharma Jana Sena	380,847	0.06	0	New
Naga People's Front	363,527	0.06	1	0
Pragatishil Samajwadi Party (Lohia)	344,546	0.06	0	New
All India Forward Bloc	322,507	0.05	0	0
Suheldev Bharatiya Samaj Party	313,925	0.05	0	0
Punjab Ekta Party	296,620	0.05	0	New
Maharashtra Swabhiman Paksha	281,578	0.05	0	New
Jammu & Kashmir National Conference	280,356	0.05	3	+3
United Democratic Party	267,256	0.04	0	0
All India N.R. Congress	247,956	0.04	0	–1
Indian National Lok Dal	240,258	0.04	0	–2
Mizo National Front	224,286	0.04	1	New
Tamil Maanila Congress	220,849	0.04	0	New
Gondwana Ganatantra Party	210,088	0.03	0	0
Jansatta Dal (Loktantrik)	203,369	0.03	0	New
Social Democratic Party of India	169,680	0.03	0	0
Sikkim Krantikari Morcha	166,922	0.03	1	+1
Nawan Punjab Party	161,645	0.03	0	New
Kerala Congress	155,135	0.03	0	New
Sikkim Democratic Front	154,489	0.03	0	–1
Peoples Party of India (Democratic)	153,103	0.02	0	New
Jammu and Kashmir People's Conference	133,612	0.02	0	0
Hindusthan Nirman Dal	122,972	0.02	0	0
Uttama Prajaakeeya Party	120,800	0.02	0	New
Bhartiya Shakti Chetna Party	105,997	0.02	0	0
Voters Party International	105,972	0.02	0	New
587 other parties with fewer than 100,000 votes	5,343,894	0.87	0	–
Independents	16,485,773	2.68	4	+1
None of the above	6,522,772	1.06	–	–
Appointed Anglo-Indians			2	–
Total	614,172,823	100.00	545	0
Valid votes	614,172,823	99.92		
Invalid/blank votes	511,575	0.08		
Total votes	614,684,398	100.00		
Registered voters/turnout	911,950,734	67.40		
Source: ECI, ECI

=== Results by State/UT Wise ===
State/Union Territory	Seats			
State/Union Territory	Seats	NDA	UPA	OTH
Andhra Pradesh	25	—N/a	—N/a	25
Arunachal Pradesh	2	2	—N/a	—N/a
Assam	14	9	3	2
Bihar	40	39	1	—N/a
Chhattisgarh	11	9	2	—N/a
Goa	2	1	1	—N/a
Gujarat	26	26	—N/a	—N/a
Haryana	10	10	—N/a	—N/a
Himachal Pradesh	4	4	—N/a	—N/a
Jammu and Kashmir	6	3	—N/a	3
Jharkhand	14	12	2	—N/a
Karnataka	28	26	2	—N/a
Kerala	20	—N/a	19	1
Madhya Pradesh	29	28	1	—N/a
Maharashtra	48	41	6	1
Manipur	2	1	—N/a	1
Meghalaya	2	1	—N/a	1
Mizoram	1	—N/a	—N/a	1
Nagaland	1	1	—N/a	—N/a
Odisha	21	8	1	12
Punjab	13	4	8	1
Rajasthan	25	25	—N/a	—N/a
Sikkim	1	—N/a	—N/a	1
Tamil Nadu	39	—N/a	39	—N/a
Telangana	17	4	3	10
Tripura	2	2	—N/a	—N/a
Uttar Pradesh	80	64	1	15
Uttarakhand	5	5	—N/a	—N/a
West Bengal	42	18	2	22
A & N Islands	1	—N/a	1	—N/a
Chandigarh	1	1	—N/a	—N/a
Dadra and Nagar Haveli	1	—N/a	—N/a	1
Daman and Diu	1	1	—N/a	—N/a
Delhi	7	7	—N/a	—N/a
Lakshadweep	1	—N/a	—N/a	1
Puducherry	1	—N/a	1	—N/a
Total	543	352	93	98

== Aftermath ==
=== Reactions ===
==== National ====
Congress party leaders, such as Rahul Gandhi and others, conceded defeat and congratulated Modi and his party. Other opposition parties and political leaders such as Sharad Pawar, Mamata Banerjee, and Omar Abdullah, congratulated Modi and the BJP for their victory.

On 20 November 2019, the Association for Democratic Reforms filed a petition with the Supreme Court of India over alleged ballot-counting discrepancies in the Lok Sabha voting and seeking a probe by the ECI.

==== International ====
The leaders of Afghanistan, Argentina, Australia, Austria, Bahrain, Bangladesh, Bhutan, Botswana, Brazil, Bulgaria, Burundi, Canada, China, Comoros, Cyprus, Czech Republic, Estonia, France, Georgia, Germany, Ghana, Iceland, Indonesia, Iran, Israel, Italy, Jamaica, Japan, Kazakhstan, Kenya, Kuwait, Kyrgyzstan, Latvia, Lesotho, Lichtenstein, Luxembourg, Madagascar, Malaysia, Maldives, Malta, Mexico, Mongolia, Myanmar, Namibia, Nepal, Netherlands, Nicaragua, North Korea, Nigeria, New Zealand, Oman, Pakistan, Palestine, Portugal, Qatar, Russia, Rwanda, Saudi Arabia, Senegal, Seychelles, Singapore, South Africa, South Korea, Sri Lanka, St. Vincent and the Grenadines, Switzerland, Tajikistan, Thailand, Turkmenistan, Uganda, Ukraine, United Arab Emirates, United Kingdom, United States, Uzbekistan, Venezuela, Vietnam, Zambia, and Zimbabwe congratulated Narendra Modi and the BJP on their victory.

=== Government formation ===
- 23 May 2019: PM Narendra Modi wins a second term with an overwhelming majority.
- 30 May 2019: PM Narendra Modi is sworn in as Prime Minister of India with 24 Cabinet Ministers, 9 MoS (Independent Charge) and 24 MoS.

=== Swearing-in ceremony ===
Narendra Modi, parliamentary leader of the Bharatiya Janata Party, started his tenure after his oath of office as the 16th Prime Minister of India on 30 May 2019. Several other ministers were also sworn in along with Modi. The ceremony was noted by media for being the first ever oath of office of an Indian Prime Minister to have been attended by the heads of all BIMSTEC countries.

=== Impact ===
The benchmark BSE Sensex and Nifty50 indices hit intraday record highs and the Indian rupee strengthened after the exit polls and on the day the election results were announced.

== Timeline ==
Electoral timelines are as below:

=== March 2019 ===
- 10 March 2019: The Election Commission of India announced election scheduled to the 17th Lok Sabha.
  - The Model Code of Conduct comes into force.
- 18 March 2019: Issue of notification for the 1st poll day.
- 19 March 2019: Issue of notification for the 2nd poll day.
- 25 March 2019: Last date for filing nominations for the 1st poll day.
- 26 March 2019: Last date for filing nominations for the 2nd poll day.
  - Scrutiny of nominations filed for the 1st poll day.
- 27 March 2019: Scrutiny of nominations filed for the 2nd poll day.
- 28 March 2019: Issue of notification for the 3rd poll day.
  - Last day for withdrawal of candidature filed for the 1st poll day.
- 29 March 2019: Last day for withdrawal of candidature filed for the 2nd poll day.

=== April 2019 ===
- 2 April 2019: Issue of notification for the 4th poll day.
- 3 April 2019: Indian National Congress released their manifesto titled Congress Will Deliver.
- 4 April 2019: Last date for filing nominations for the 3rd poll day.
- 5 April 2019: Scrutiny of nominations filed for the 3rd poll day.
- 8 April 2019: Bharatiya Janata Party released its manifesto titled Sankalpit Bharat, Sashakt Bharat.
  - Last day for withdrawal of candidature filed for the 3rd poll day.
- 9 April 2019: Last date for filing nominations for the 4th poll day.
- 10 April 2019: Issue of notification for the 5th poll day.
  - Scrutiny of nominations filed for the 4th poll day.
- 11 April 2019: Polling held at 91 parliamentary constituencies spanning over 20 states for the first poll day.
- 12 April 2019: Last day for withdrawal of candidature filed for the 4th poll day.
- 16 April 2019: Issue of notification for the 6th poll day.
- 18 April 2019: Polling held at 95 parliamentary constituencies spanning over 13 states for the second poll day. (Vellore constituency election cancelled due to illegal cash deposit from Dravida Munnetra Kazhagam candidate.)
  - Last date for filing nominations for the 5th poll day.
- 20 April 2019: Scrutiny of nominations filed for the 5th poll day.
- 22 April 2019: Issue of notification for the 7th poll day.
  - Last day for withdrawal of candidature filed for the 5th poll day.
- 23 April 2019: Polling held at 117 parliamentary constituencies spanning over 14 states for the third poll day.
  - Last date for filing nominations for the 6th poll day.
- 24 April 2019: Scrutiny of nominations filed for the 6th poll day.
- 26 April 2019: Last day for withdrawal of candidature filed for the 6th poll day.
- 29 April 2019: Polling held at 71 parliamentary constituencies spanning over 9 states for the fourth poll day.
  - Last date for filing nominations for the 7th poll day.
- 30 April 2019: Scrutiny of nominations filed for the 7th poll day.

=== May 2019 ===
- 2 May 2019: Last day for withdrawal of candidature filed for the 7th poll day.
- 6 May 2019: Polling held for 51 parliamentary constituencies in more than 7 states for the fifth polling day.
- 12 May 2019: Polling held for 59 parliamentary constituencies in more than 7 states the sixth polling day.
- 19 May 2019: Polling held at 59 parliamentary constituencies in more than 8 states the seventh polling day.
- 23 May 2019: Counting of votes and declaration of results for all polling days.

== See also ==
- List of members of the 17th Lok Sabha
- 2019 Rajya Sabha elections
- 2019 elections in India
- Politics of India Category:2019 Indian general election by state or union territory
