= Results of the 2014 Indian general election =

To constitute India's 16th Lok Sabha, general elections were held in April–May 2014. The result was announced on 16 May 2014. The main contenders were two alliance groups of the Incumbent United Progressive Alliance and the Opposition National Democratic Alliance; led by Indian National Congress and Bharatiya Janata Party respectively.

This article describes the performance of various political parties. For the performance of individual candidates, please see, List of members of the 16th Lok Sabha.

== Results by party ==
Party	Votes	%	Seats
Bharatiya Janata Party	171,660,230	31.00	282
Indian National Congress	106,935,942	19.31	44
Bahujan Samaj Party	22,946,346	4.14	0
All India Trinamool Congress	21,262,665	3.84	34
Samajwadi Party	18,673,089	3.37	5
All India Anna Dravida Munnetra Kazhagam	18,111,579	3.27	37
Communist Party of India (Marxist)	17,988,955	3.25	9
Telugu Desam Party	14,099,230	2.55	16
YSR Congress Party	13,995,435	2.53	9
Aam Aadmi Party	11,325,387	2.05	4
Shiv Sena	10,262,544	1.85	18
Dravida Munnetra Kazhagam	9,631,246	1.74	0
Biju Janata Dal	9,489,946	1.71	20
Nationalist Congress Party	8,635,558	1.56	6
Rashtriya Janata Dal	7,440,937	1.34	4
Telangana Rashtra Samithi	6,736,270	1.22	11
Janata Dal (United)	5,992,281	1.08	2
Communist Party of India	4,327,460	0.78	1
Janata Dal (Secular)	3,731,481	0.67	2
Shiromani Akali Dal	3,636,148	0.66	4
Indian National Lok Dal	2,799,899	0.51	2
All India United Democratic Front	2,333,040	0.42	3
Lok Jan Shakti Party	2,295,929	0.41	6
Desiya Murpokku Dravida Kazhagam	2,078,843	0.38	0
Pattali Makkal Katchi	1,827,566	0.33	1
Revolutionary Socialist Party	1,666,380	0.30	1
Jharkhand Mukti Morcha	1,637,994	0.30	2
Jharkhand Vikas Morcha (Prajatantrik)	1,579,772	0.29	0
Marumalarchi Dravida Munnetra Kazhagam	1,417,535	0.26	0
All India Forward Bloc	1,211,418	0.22	0
Swabhimani Paksha	1,105,073	0.20	1
Indian Union Muslim League	1,100,096	0.20	2
Rashtriya Lok Samta Party	1,078,473	0.19	3
Communist Party of India (Marxist–Leninist) Liberation	1,007,275	0.18	0
Naga People's Front	994,505	0.18	1
Apna Dal	821,820	0.15	2
Bahujan Mukti Party	791,951	0.14	0
Jammu and Kashmir Peoples Democratic Party	732,644	0.13	3
Maharashtra Navnirman Sena	708,010	0.13	0
Haryana Janhit Congress (BL)	703,698	0.13	0
Rashtriya Lok Dal	696,918	0.13	0
All India Majlis-E-Ittehadul Muslimeen	685,730	0.12	1
Viduthalai Chiruthaigal Katchi	606,110	0.11	0
Asom Gana Parishad	577,730	0.10	0
National Peoples Party	576,448	0.10	1
Socialist Unity Centre of India (Communist)	520,972	0.09	0
Peace Party	518,724	0.09	0
Peasants and Workers Party of India	497,721	0.09	0
All Jharkhand Students Union	488,719	0.09	0
Rashtriya Samaj Paksha	458,580	0.08	0
Kerala Congress (M)	424,194	0.08	1
Jammu & Kashmir National Conference	396,713	0.07	0
Social Democratic Party of India	396,524	0.07	0
Bharipa Bahujan Mahasangh	360,854	0.07	0
Quami Ekta Dal	354,577	0.06	0
Bodoland People's Front	330,106	0.06	0
Socialist Janata (Democratic)	307,597	0.06	0
Gondwana Ganatantra Party	301,366	0.05	0
Bahujan Vikas Aaghadi	293,681	0.05	0
Puthiya Tamilagam	262,812	0.05	0
All India N.R. Congress	255,826	0.05	1
Manithaneya Makkal Katchi	236,679	0.04	0
Welfare Party of India	228,645	0.04	0
Jai Bharat Samanta Party	215,607	0.04	0
Republican Party of India (Athawale)	206,689	0.04	0
Jai Samaikyandhra Party	204,260	0.04	0
Jharkhand Party	203,869	0.04	0
Pyramid Party of India	185,478	0.03	0
Ambedkarite Party of India	185,095	0.03	0
Lok Satta Party	165,670	0.03	0
Sikkim Democratic Front	163,698	0.03	1
Aama Odisha Party	155,900	0.03	0
National Unionist Zamindara Party	124,990	0.02	0
Sikkim Krantikari Morcha	121,956	0.02	0
Suheldev Bhartiya Samaj Party	118,947	0.02	0
Communist Party of India (Marxist–Leninist) Red Star	114,323	0.02	0
Marxist Co-ordination Committee	110,185	0.02	0
Jharkhand Disom Party	109,843	0.02	0
United Democratic Party	106,817	0.02	0
Rashtriya Parivartan Dal	95,644	0.02	0
Bharatiya Ekta Dal	90,314	0.02	0
Republican Party of India	87,952	0.02	0
Bhartiya Shakti Chetna Party	79,359	0.01	0
Amra Bangalee	74,626	0.01	0
Jammu and Kashmir People's Conference	71,154	0.01	0
Republican Paksha (Khoripa)	70,924	0.01	0
Bahujan Sangharshh Dal	59,815	0.01	0
Samajwadi Janata Party (Rashtriya)	59,756	0.01	0
Akhil Bharatiya Muslim League (Secular)	59,735	0.01	0
Jai Maha Bharath Party	57,988	0.01	0
Jammu and Kashmir National Panthers Party	57,103	0.01	0
Rashtriya Ulama Council	56,324	0.01	0
Janta Dal Rashtravadi	53,864	0.01	0
Tamil Nadu Makkal Congress	49,024	0.01	0
Lokdal	48,202	0.01	0
Janvadi Party (Socialist)	47,696	0.01	0
People's Party of Arunachal	47,018	0.01	0
Hindustan Janta Party	46,761	0.01	0
Rashtriya Krantikari Samajwadi Party	46,756	0.01	0
Bharat Vikas Morcha	45,667	0.01	0
Odisha Jan Morcha	44,397	0.01	0
Revolutionary Socialist Party of Kerala (Bolshevik)	43,051	0.01	0
Chhattisgarh Swabhiman Manch	41,908	0.01	0
Socialist Party (India)	41,518	0.01	0
Pragatisheel Manav Samaj Party	39,039	0.01	0
Rajnaitik Vikalp Party	38,992	0.01	0
Bharatiya Yuva Shakti	38,633	0.01	0
Rashtriya Deshaj Party	38,322	0.01	0
Naitik Party	36,181	0.01	0
Shiromani Akali Dal (Amritsar)(Simranjit Singh Mann)	35,516	0.01	0
Karunaadu Party	33,172	0.01	0
Rashtriya Janadhikar Suraksha Party	32,514	0.01	0
Rashtriya Samanta Dal	30,888	0.01	0
Samyak Parivartan Party	30,805	0.01	0
Hindu Mahasabha	29,483	0.01	0
Paschimanchal Vikas Party	28,775	0.01	0
Prem Janata Dal	28,671	0.01	0
Jago Party	27,624	0.00	0
Jai Prakash Janata Dal	27,619	0.00	0
Ambedkar Samaj Party	27,589	0.00	0
Jai Hind Samaj Party	27,122	0.00	0
Vanchitsamaj Insaaf Party	23,991	0.00	0
Gareeb Aadmi Party	23,505	0.00	0
Republican Party of India (Khobragade)	23,110	0.00	0
Mahan Dal	22,774	0.00	0
Party for Democratic Socialism	22,284	0.00	0
Mahajana Socialist Party	22,022	0.00	0
Samta Party	21,631	0.00	0
Bajjikanchal Vikas Party	21,524	0.00	0
Indigenous People's Front of Tripura	21,326	0.00	0
Prajatantrik Samadhan Party	21,284	0.00	0
Kalinga Sena	21,143	0.00	0
Samata Kranti Dal	20,910	0.00	0
Bharatiya Jana Sangh	20,902	0.00	0
Bharatiya National Janta Dal	20,209	0.00	0
Ambedkar National Congress	19,863	0.00	0
Prabuddha Republican Party	19,470	0.00	0
Most Backward Classes of India	19,417	0.00	0
Sarvajan Kalyan Loktantrik Party	19,253	0.00	0
Rashtriya Janasachetan Party	18,210	0.00	0
Manavtawadi Samaj Party	17,890	0.00	0
Desiya Forward Bloc	17,465	0.00	0
Socialistic Democratic Party	17,435	0.00	0
Indian Savarn Samaj Party	16,903	0.00	0
Jharkhand Party (Naren)	16,670	0.00	0
Akhil Bhartiya Jharkhand Party	16,616	0.00	0
Samata Samadhan Party	16,501	0.00	0
Ambedkarist Republican Party	16,461	0.00	0
Shoshit Samaj Dal	16,446	0.00	0
Rashtriya Independent Morcha	16,299	0.00	0
Bharatiya Momin Front	16,182	0.00	0
Nav Bharat Democratic Party	16,153	0.00	0
Sankhyanupati Bhagidari Party	16,078	0.00	0
Naya Daur Party	15,967	0.00	0
Bharatiya Sant Mat Party	15,940	0.00	0
Moulik Adhikar Party	15,742	0.00	0
Sarva Janata Party	15,474	0.00	0
Ati Picchara party	15,370	0.00	0
Proutist Sarva Samaj	15,368	0.00	0
Jai Hind Party	14,754	0.00	0
Bharatiya Jan Kranti Dal (Democratic)	14,685	0.00	0
Indian Christian Secular Party	14,360	0.00	0
Swaraj (J)	14,152	0.00	0
Indian Unity Centre	13,527	0.00	0
Lok Bharati	13,399	0.00	0
Maharashtra Parivartan Sena (T)	13,339	0.00	0
Lokpriya Samaj Party	13,304	0.00	0
Rashtriya Ahinsa Manch	13,185	0.00	0
Marxist Communist Party of India (United)	13,019	0.00	0
Rashtriya Apna Dal	12,366	0.00	0
Jharkhand Anushilan Party	12,240	0.00	0
Andhra Rastra Praja Samithi	12,042	0.00	0
Adarsh Rashtriya Vikas Party	12,037	0.00	0
Indian National League	11,924	0.00	0
Aadivasi Sena Party	11,362	0.00	0
Swarajya Party of India	11,361	0.00	0
Majlis Bachao Tahreek	11,347	0.00	0
Minorities Democratic Party	11,225	0.00	0
Akhil Bhartiya Mithila Party	11,221	0.00	0
National Loktantrik Party	11,174	0.00	0
Bahujan Samaj Party (Ambedkar)	11,104	0.00	0
Jharkhand Vikas Dal	10,870	0.00	0
Regional Democratic Secular Congress	10,800	0.00	0
Rashtriya Janwadi Party (Krantikari)	10,797	0.00	0
Jamat-E-Seratul Mustakim	10,564	0.00	0
Megh Desham Party	10,490	0.00	0
Sarva Samaj Kalyan Party	10,239	0.00	0
Bharat Bhrashtachar Mitao Party	10,160	0.00	0
Rashtriya Gondvana Party	10,142	0.00	0
Loktantrik Janata Party (Secular)	10,026	0.00	0
Samajwadi Jan Parishad	10,008	0.00	0
All India Minorities Front	9,938	0.00	0
Samruddha Odisha	9,794	0.00	0
Samtawadi Republican Party	9,561	0.00	0
Bharatiya Dr. B.R. Ambedkar Janta Party	9,481	0.00	0
Aam Janata Party	9,371	0.00	0
Apna Dal United Party	9,265	0.00	0
Ulzaipali Makkal Katchy	9,194	0.00	0
Tripura Pragatishil Gramin Congress	8,952	0.00	0
Hindusthan Nirman Dal	8,889	0.00	0
Hindusthan Praja Paksha	8,853	0.00	0
Bhartiya Ekta Manch Party	8,729	0.00	0
Rashtravadi Janata Party	8,713	0.00	0
Aadijan Mukti Sena	8,544	0.00	0
Makkal Manadu Katchi	8,468	0.00	0
Kosal Kranti Dal	8,448	0.00	0
Bharatiya Republican Paksha	8,226	0.00	0
Rajasthan Vikas Party	8,152	0.00	0
Shramajeevi Party	7,953	0.00	0
Hindustan Vikas Dal	7,921	0.00	0
Kisan Majdoor Berojgar Sangh	7,839	0.00	0
Dalita Bahujana Party	7,746	0.00	0
Rashtriya Congress (J) Party	7,650	0.00	0
All India Peoples' Front (Radical)	7,630	0.00	0
Krantikari Vikas Dal	7,541	0.00	0
Bharatiya Kisan Parivartan Party	7,342	0.00	0
Peoples Guardian	7,222	0.00	0
Bharatiya Bahujan Congress	7,197	0.00	0
Rashtriya Jan-Jagram Morcha	7,147	0.00	0
Sanatan Sanskriti Raksha Dal	7,115	0.00	0
B.C. United Front	7,036	0.00	0
Rashtra Sewa Dal	6,994	0.00	0
Sanyukt Samajwadi Dal	6,788	0.00	0
Bihar Janta Party	6,765	0.00	0
Hindustan Krantikari Dal	6,703	0.00	0
Sarvajan Samaj Party (D)	6,681	0.00	0
Jan Shakti Ekta Party	6,636	0.00	0
Samaikya Telugu Rajyam	6,542	0.00	0
Socialist Republican Party	6,512	0.00	0
Proutist Bloc, India	6,509	0.00	0
United Communist Party of India	6,472	0.00	0
Indian Labour Party (Ambedkar Phule)	6,390	0.00	0
Republican Backward Congress	6,265	0.00	0
Rashtriya Naujawan Dal	6,192	0.00	0
Al-Hind Party	5,977	0.00	0
Aarakshan Virodhi Party	5,861	0.00	0
Bhartiya Sarvjan Party	5,845	0.00	0
The Lok Party of India	5,804	0.00	0
Rashtriya Bahujan Congress Party	5,801	0.00	0
Bharatiya Gaon Taj Dal	5,761	0.00	0
Apna Desh Party	5,579	0.00	0
Deshbhakt Nirman Party	5,485	0.00	0
Bahujan Sangharsh Party (Kanshiram)	5,416	0.00	0
Moderate Party	5,406	0.00	0
Bundelkhand Congress	5,371	0.00	0
Bharatiya Inqalab Party	5,362	0.00	0
Eklavya Samaj Party	5,341	0.00	0
Democratic Bharatiya Samaj Party	5,240	0.00	0
Agar Jan Party	5,228	0.00	0
Indian Krantikari Lehar	5,084	0.00	0
New India Party	5,082	0.00	0
Moolniwasi Samaj Party	4,986	0.00	0
Bhartiya Satya Sangharsh Party	4,956	0.00	0
Samajwadi Samaj Party	4,947	0.00	0
Samaikyandhra Parirakshana Samithi	4,870	0.00	0
Poorvanchal Rashtriya Congress	4,852	0.00	0
Kalyankari Jantantrik Party	4,839	0.00	0
Jan-Nyay Dal	4,719	0.00	0
Bhartiya Jantantrik Janata Dal	4,664	0.00	0
Bharatiya Bahujan Party	4,653	0.00	0
Rashtriya Jankranti Morcha	4,647	0.00	0
Yuva Sarkar	4,578	0.00	0
Rashtriya Congress (Babu Jagjivanram)	4,527	0.00	0
Rayalaseema Parirakshana Samithi	4,521	0.00	0
Jan Sevak Party	4,489	0.00	0
Shakti Sena (Bharat Desh)	4,466	0.00	0
Braj Vikas Party	4,411	0.00	0
Manav Mukti Morcha	4,409	0.00	0
Lok Parivartan Party (DC)	4,396	0.00	0
All Jammu and Kashmir Kisan Majdoor Party	4,392	0.00	0
Awami Aamjan Party	4,380	0.00	0
Akhil Bharatiya Shivsena Rashtrawadi	4,380	0.00	0
Rashtriya Ambedkar Dal	4,327	0.00	0
Bharatiya Peoples Party	4,291	0.00	0
Jai Vijaya Bharathi Party	4,270	0.00	0
Chhattisgarhiya Party	4,265	0.00	0
Bhartiya Krishak Dal	4,250	0.00	0
Rastriya Insaaf Party	4,219	0.00	0
Rashtriya Sarvajan Party	4,215	0.00	0
Bhartiya Vanchitsamaj Party	4,142	0.00	0
Dharam Nirpeksh Dal	4,130	0.00	0
Rashtriya Janpriya Party	4,117	0.00	0
Rashtriya Kranti Party	4,112	0.00	0
Rajyadhikara Party	4,112	0.00	0
Parcham Party of India	4,082	0.00	0
Pragatisheel Samaj Party	4,052	0.00	0
Swatantra Samaj Party	4,016	0.00	0
Vichara Jagruthi Congress Paksha	3,972	0.00	0
Janta Raj Party	3,846	0.00	0
Nirjatita Samaj Biplabi Party	3,829	0.00	0
Bharatiya Kisan Sena Loktantrik	3,826	0.00	0
New All India Congress Party	3,778	0.00	0
Awami Vikas Party	3,747	0.00	0
Lok Shakti	3,722	0.00	0
Maharashtra Vikas Aghadi	3,715	0.00	0
National Development Party	3,618	0.00	0
Jharkhand Mukti Morcha (Ulgulan)	3,512	0.00	0
Indian Peoples Green Party	3,488	0.00	0
Asankhya Samaj Party	3,482	0.00	0
Bharatiya Minorities Suraksha Mahasangh	3,441	0.00	0
Rashtriya Aam Party	3,408	0.00	0
Bharat Ki Lok Jimmedar Party	3,392	0.00	0
Bharti Jan Suraksha Party	3,336	0.00	0
Rashtriya Sant Sandesh Party	3,283	0.00	0
National Tiger Party	3,251	0.00	0
Bharatiya Rashtriya Bahujan Samaj Vikas Party	3,238	0.00	0
Pragatisheel Magahi Samaj	3,076	0.00	0
National Lokmat Party	3,072	0.00	0
Ezhuchi Tamilargal Munnetra Kazhagam	3,023	0.00	0
Ex-Sainik Kissan Party	2,988	0.00	0
Shoshit Sandesh Party	2,982	0.00	0
Rashtriya Viklang Party	2,958	0.00	0
Nagrik Ekta Party	2,917	0.00	0
Republican Bahujan Sena	2,910	0.00	0
Gorkha Rashtriya Congress	2,906	0.00	0
Jan Morcha	2,901	0.00	0
Vishva Hindustani Sangathan	2,880	0.00	0
Rashtriya Mahan Gantantra Party	2,872	0.00	0
Loktantrik Samajwadi Party	2,820	0.00	0
Rani Chennamma Party	2,803	0.00	0
Hindustan Kranti Dal	2,761	0.00	0
Andhra Pradesh Rashtra Samaikya Samithi Party	2,743	0.00	0
Jawan Kisan Morcha	2,711	0.00	0
Prism	2,694	0.00	0
Rashtriya Janshakti Party (Eklavya)	2,654	0.00	0
Great India Party	2,594	0.00	0
Bhartiya Pragatisheel Congress	2,571	0.00	0
Inqalab Vikas Dal	2,570	0.00	0
Telangana Loksatta Party	2,567	0.00	0
Jan Raajya Party	2,543	0.00	0
Bharat Nav Nirman Party	2,533	0.00	0
Akhil Bharatiya Samajwadi Congress	2,530	0.00	0
Namadhu Makkal Katchi	2,511	0.00	0
Mahamukti Dal	2,482	0.00	0
Mahila Swabhiman Party	2,425	0.00	0
Bharatiya Sarvodaya Kranti Party	2,409	0.00	0
Rashtriya Vikas Party	2,396	0.00	0
Anaithindia Dravidar Samudaya Munnetra Kazhagam	2,372	0.00	0
Sarvshreshth Dal	2,329	0.00	0
Telangana Communist Party of India	2,311	0.00	0
Akhil Bhartiya Vikas Congress Party	2,255	0.00	0
Jantantra Party	2,249	0.00	0
Rashtriya Rashtrawadi Party	2,225	0.00	0
National Janhit Congress (AB)	2,196	0.00	0
Rashtrawadi Samaj Party	2,181	0.00	0
Dharmarajya Paksha	2,175	0.00	0
Indian Peace Party	2,155	0.00	0
Bhartiya Republican Party (Insan)	2,138	0.00	0
Atulya Bharat Party	2,135	0.00	0
Mahanwadi Party	2,101	0.00	0
Rashtriya Karmyog Party	2,096	0.00	0
Uttarakhand Parivartan Party	2,045	0.00	0
Akhil Rashtrawadi Party	2,029	0.00	0
Rashtriya Praja Congress (Secular)	2,025	0.00	0
Manipur Democratic Peoples's Front	2,005	0.00	0
Bhartiya Jan Yug Party	2,000	0.00	0
Bharat Nirman Party	2,000	0.00	0
Socialist Party (Lohia)	1,997	0.00	0
Labour Party of India (V.V. Prasad)	1,993	0.00	0
Indian Bahujan Sandesh Party (Kanshiram)	1,952	0.00	0
Dr. Ambedkar Samajvadi Democratic Party	1,949	0.00	0
Adarsh Manavtawadi Party	1,920	0.00	0
Bhartiya Navjawan Sena (Paksha)	1,862	0.00	0
Rashtriya Bahujan Hitay Party	1,842	0.00	0
Narayani Sena	1,725	0.00	0
Bahujan Suraksha Dal	1,723	0.00	0
Brihattar Bharat Prajatantra Sewa Party	1,679	0.00	0
Bhartiya Party	1,635	0.00	0
Rashtriya Uttarakhand Party	1,629	0.00	0
Awami Samta Party	1,617	0.00	0
Bharatiya Rashtriya Mazdoor Dal	1,607	0.00	0
All India Azaad Congress Party	1,593	0.00	0
Rashtriya Manav samman Party	1,572	0.00	0
Rashtriya Janshanti Party	1,571	0.00	0
All Jammu and Kashmir Republican Party	1,568	0.00	0
Rashtriya Janta Party	1,526	0.00	0
Rashtriya Bandhutwa Party	1,521	0.00	0
Jebamani Janata	1,517	0.00	0
Loktantrik Rashrtavadi Party	1,491	0.00	0
Nehru Janhit Congress	1,463	0.00	0
Akhil Bharatiya Congress Dal (Ambedkar)	1,461	0.00	0
Navodyam Party	1,455	0.00	0
Bhartiya Naujawan Inklav Party	1,440	0.00	0
Rashtriya Vikas Manch Party	1,434	0.00	0
Bhartiya Samajik Kranti Dal	1,423	0.00	0
Bhrashtachar Mukti Morcha	1,413	0.00	0
Bharatiya Navyuvak Party	1,408	0.00	0
Punjab Labour Party	1,386	0.00	0
Kamarajar Deseeya Congress	1,345	0.00	0
Democratic Prajakranthi Party Secularist	1,342	0.00	0
Bharatiya Jawala Shakti Paksha	1,337	0.00	0
Jan Raksha Party	1,318	0.00	0
Democratic Secular Party	1,262	0.00	0
Rashtriya Komi Ekta Party	1,254	0.00	0
National Organisation Congress	1,198	0.00	0
Rashtrawadi Parivartan Party (L.B.)	1,195	0.00	0
All India Mazdoor Party (Rangreta)	1,182	0.00	0
National Youth Party	1,176	0.00	0
Bahujan Kranti Party (Marxwad-Ambedkarwad)	1,174	0.00	0
Bhartiya Vikas Party	1,152	0.00	0
Rashtriya Janmorcha	1,145	0.00	0
Bhartiya Janta Dal (Integrated)	1,118	0.00	0
Rashtriya Garib Dal	1,111	0.00	0
Indian Justice Party	1,103	0.00	0
Bharatiya Samaj Dal	1,096	0.00	0
Voters Party	1,089	0.00	0
Akhil Bharatiya Manavata Paksha	1,077	0.00	0
The Religion of Man Revolving Political Party of India	1,071	0.00	0
Indian Bahujan Samajwadi Party	1,059	0.00	0
Rashtriya Shoshit Samaj Party	1,054	0.00	0
Akhil Bhartiya Aamjan Party	1,040	0.00	0
Manavadhikar Janshakti Party	997	0.00	0
Himachal Swabhiman Party	997	0.00	0
Majlis Markaz-e-Siyasee Party	959	0.00	0
Dalit Vikas Party(Bharat)	950	0.00	0
Janral Samaj Party	944	0.00	0
Shivrajya Party	944	0.00	0
Union Party of India	944	0.00	0
Aazadi Ka Antim Aandolan Dal	937	0.00	0
Bhartiya Shramik Dal Socialist	924	0.00	0
Rashtriya Morcha Party	923	0.00	0
Republican Party of India Ektavadi	910	0.00	0
Hindustan Swaraj Congress Party	888	0.00	0
Bharatiya Mool Niwasi Samaj Party	877	0.00	0
Democratic Congress Party	833	0.00	0
Bhartiya Chaitanya Party	802	0.00	0
National Party	791	0.00	0
Goa Su-Raj Party	783	0.00	0
Samta Vikas Party	763	0.00	0
Kannada Chalavali Vatal Paksha	707	0.00	0
Prajatantra Aadhar Party	698	0.00	0
Akhil Bharatiya Hind Kranti Party	685	0.00	0
Akhil Bharatiya Rajarya Sabha	683	0.00	0
Social Action Party	682	0.00	0
Rashtriya Sawarn Dal	665	0.00	0
Akhand Bharat Samaj Party	651	0.00	0
Indian Oceanic Party	649	0.00	0
Rashtriya Ekta Party	601	0.00	0
B.C. Bharata Desam Party	596	0.00	0
Hindustan Ekta Party	566	0.00	0
Adarsh Samaj Party	557	0.00	0
Indian Gandhiyan Party	546	0.00	0
All India Ravidas Samata Party	543	0.00	0
Uttar Pradesh Republican Party	542	0.00	0
Goemcarancho Otrec Astro	530	0.00	0
Bharatiya Nav Kranti Party	502	0.00	0
Nava Bharat National Party	485	0.00	0
Thrinamool Tamil Nadu Congress	474	0.00	0
Navbharat Nirman Party	441	0.00	0
Parivartan Samaj Party	433	0.00	0
Rashtriya Janadhikar Party	415	0.00	0
Indians Victory Party	398	0.00	0
Sardar Vallabhbhai Patel Party	394	0.00	0
Ambedkar People's Movement	372	0.00	0
Majdoor Kisan Union Party	360	0.00	0
Jan Samanta Party	357	0.00	0
Vanchit Jamat Party	350	0.00	0
People's Party of India (Secular)	331	0.00	0
Bhartiya Jan Manch	325	0.00	0
Akhil Bharatiya Ashok Sena	296	0.00	0
Vishva SHakti Party	263	0.00	0
Rashtriya Jatigat Aarakshan Virodhi Party	259	0.00	0
Rashtriya Jankranti Party	217	0.00	0
Bharat Vishal Party	161	0.00	0
Independents	16,737,720	3.02	3
None of the Above	6,002,942	1.08	–
Nominated Anglo-Indians			2
Total	553,802,946	100.00	545
Valid votes	553,802,946	99.93	
Invalid/blank votes	368,873	0.07	
Total votes	554,171,819	100.00	
Registered voters/turnout	834,082,814	66.44	
Source: ECI

=== Results by Alliance ===
Vote share of NDA was 38.5% and that of UPA was 23%.

National Democratic Alliance

336 / 543

282	18	16	6	4	3	2	1	1	1	1	1
BJP	SS	TDP	LJP	SAD	RLSP	AD	PMK	SWP	AINRC	NPP	NPF

United Progressive Alliance

60 / 543

1	1	2	2	4	6	44
RSP	KC(M)	JMM	IUML	RJD	NCP	INC

Others (Non-Allied)

147 / 543

37	34	20	11	2	3	4	3	2	2	5	1	1	9	3	1	9
AIADMK	AITC	BJD	TRS	INLD	AIUDF	AAP	J&KPDP	JD(S)	JD(U)	SP	SDF	AIMIM	YSRCP	IND.	CPI	CPI(M)

== Results by State ==
=== Andaman & Nicobar Islands (1) ===
BJP (1)

Name of Party	Vote Share %	Change	Seats won	Changes
Bharatiya Janata Party	47.8	+3.59	1	0
Indian National Congress	44.8	+1.23	0	0

=== Andhra Pradesh (25) ===
TDP (15)	BJP (2)	YSRCP (8)

Name of Party	Vote Share %	Change	Seats won	Changes
Telugu Desam Party (NDA)	28.10	+4.17	15	+9
YSR Congress Party	28.90	+28.90	8	+8
Indian National Congress	11.5	-27.45	0	-19
Bharatiya Janata Party (NDA)	8.50	---	2	+2

=== Arunachal Pradesh (2) ===
BJP (1)	INC (1)

Party Name	Popular vote			Seats		
Party Name	Votes	%	±pp	Contested	Won	+/−
BJP	2,75,344	46.12	▲8.95	2	1	▲1
INC	2,46,084	41.22	▼9.89	2	1	▼1
PPA	47,018	7.88	New entry	2	0	Steady
AITC	9,135	1.53	New entry	1	0	Steady
NCP	6,065	1.02	New entry	1	0	Steady
AAP	3,647	0.61	New entry	1	0	Steady
Total	5,96,956	100%	-	11	2	-

=== Assam (14) ===
BJP (7)	AIUDF (3)	IND (1)	INC (3)

Party	Seats			Popular vote			2nd position	3rd position
Party	Contested	Won	+/−	Votes	%	±pp	2nd position	3rd position
Bharatiya Janata Party	13	7	▲3	55,07,152	36.50	▲19.29	5	1
Indian National Congress	13	3	▼4	44,67,295	29.60	▼4.31	8	2
All India United Democratic Front	10	3	▲1	22,37,612	14.80	▼2.30	0	4
Asom Gana Parishad	12	0	▼1	5,77,730	3.80	▼8.81	0	3
Independent (politician)	58	1	▲1	14,36,900	9.62	▲2.02	1	2
Bodoland People's Front	2	0	▼1	3,30,106	2.21	Steady	0	2

=== Bihar (40) ===
BJP (22)	LJP (6)	RLSP (3)	JDU (2)	RJD (4)	NCP (1)	INC (2)

Alliance/ Party		Popular vote			Seats		
Alliance/ Party		Votes	%	±pp	Contested	Won	+/−
NDA	BJP	1,05,43,025	29.38		30	22	▲10
NDA	LJP	22,95,929	6.40		7	6	▲7
NDA	RLSP	10,72,804	2.99		3	3	▲3
NDA	Total	1,39,11,758	38.77		40	31	
UPA	RJD	72,24,893	20.13		27	4	Steady
UPA	INC	30,21,065	8.42		12	2	Steady
UPA	NCP	4,31,292	1.20	Steady	1	1	▲1
UPA	Total	1,06,77,250	29.75		40	7	
JD(U)+	JD(U)	56,62,444	15.78		38	2	
JD(U)+	CPI	4,13,347	1.15		2	0	
JD(U)+	Total	60,75,791	16.93	Steady	40	2	Steady
BSP		7,65,758	2.13		40	0	
CPI(M-L)L		4,63,045	1.29		23	0	
Others		9,91,397	2.76	Steady	184	0	Steady
IND		15,33,264	4.27	Steady	169	0	Steady
NOTA		5,80,964	1.62	Steady			
Total		3,58,85,332	100%	Steady	606	40	Steady

=== Chandigarh (1) ===
BJP (1)

Name of Party	Vote Share %	Change	Seats won	Changes
Bharatiya Janata Party	42.20	+19.46	1	+1
Indian National Congress	26.80	-20.07	0	-1
Aam Aadmi Party	24.00	New	0	0

=== Chhattisgarh (11) ===
BJP (10)	INC (1)

Parties and coalitions	Seats			Popular vote		
Parties and coalitions	Contested	Won	+/−	Votes	%	±pp
Bharatiya Janata Party	11	10	Steady	59,73,904	49.65%	▲4.62%
Indian National Congress	11	1	Steady	47,02,813	39.09%	▲1.78%
Bahujan Samaj Party	11	0	Steady	2,93,910	2.44%	▼2.08%
Aam Aadmi Party	10	0	New	1,40,681	1.16%	New
Gondwana Ganatantra Party	7	0	Steady	99,644	0.83%	▲0.13%
Independents	106	0	Steady	5,16,427	4.29%	▼5.56%
Total	11			1,20,30,690		
Valid votes	1,20,30,690	98.16				
Votes cast / turnout	1,22,55,579	69.54				
Registered voters	1,76,23,049	100.0				

=== Dadra & Nagar Haveli (1) ===
BJP (1)

Name of Party	Vote Share %	Change	Seats won	Changes
Bharatiya Janata Party	48.90	+2.47	1	0
Indian National Congress	45.10	-0.75	0	0

=== Daman & Diu (1) ===
BJP (1)

Name of Party	Vote Share %	Change	Seats won	Changes
Bharatiya Janata Party	53.80%	-11.46	1	0
Indian National Congress	43.30%	+14.29	0	0

=== NCT of Delhi (7) ===
BJP (7)

Party Name	Popular vote			Seats		
Party Name	Votes	%	±pp	Contested	Won	+/−
BJP	38,38,850	46.41	▲11.18	7	7	▲7
AAP	27,22,887	32.92	New entry	7	0	Steady
INC	12,53,078	15.15	▼41.96	7	0	▼7
NOTA	39,690	0.48	New entry			
Total	82,71,766	100%	-	150	7	-

=== Goa (2) ===
BJP (2)

Party Name	Popular vote			Seats		
Party Name	Votes	%	±pp	Contested	Won	+/−
BJP	4,36,679	54.12	▲8.67	2	2	▲1
INC	2,98,750	37.02	▲13.97	2	0	▼1
AAP	27,103	3.32	New entry	2	0	Steady
NOTA	10,103	1.24	Steady			
Total	8,17,000	100%	-	19	2	-

=== Gujarat (26) ===
BJP (26)

Party/Alliance		Popular vote			Seats		
Party/Alliance		Votes	%	±pp	Contested	Won	+/−
BJP		1,52,49,243	59.05	▲12.53	26	26	▲11
UPA	INC	84,86,083	32.86	▼10.52	25	0	▼11
UPA	NCP	2,40,466	0.93		1	0	
UPA	Total	87,26,549	33.79	Steady	26	0	Steady
AAP		3,01,558	1.17	New entry	24	0	Steady
BSP		2,43,949	0.94		24	0	
JD(U)		1,01,660	0.39		12	0	
Others		2,04,153	0.79	Steady	64	0	Steady
IND		5,36,024	2.08		157	0	Steady
NOTA		4,26,070	1.72	Steady	26	Steady	Steady
Total		2,58,24,003	100%	-	334	4	-

=== Haryana (10) ===
BJP (7)	INLD (2)	INC (1)

Alliance/ Party		Popular vote			Seats		
Alliance/ Party		Votes	%	±pp	Contested	Won	+/−
NDA	BJP	39,93,527	34.74	▲22.65	8	7	▲7
NDA	HJC(BL)	7,03,698	6.12	▼3.89	2	0	▼1
NDA	Total	46,97,225	40.86	Steady	10	7	Steady
INLD		27,99,899	24.36	▲8.59	10	2	▲2
INC		26,34,905	22.92	▼18.85	10	1	▼8
BSP		5,27,013	4.58	▼11.16	10	0	Steady
AAP		4,87,941	4.24	New	10	0	Steady
Others		1,22,670	1.07	Steady	59	0	Steady
IND		1,91,278	1.66	▼0.96	121	0	Steady
NOTA		34,220	0.30	New	10	Steady	Steady
Total		1,14,95,151	100%	-	230	10	-

=== Himachal Pradesh (4) ===
BJP (4)

Party Name	Popular vote			Seats		
Party Name	Votes	%	±pp	Contested	Won	+/−
BJP	16,52,995	53.35	▲3.77	4	4	▲1
INC	12,60,477	40.68	▼4.93	4	0	▼1
Others	1,27,366	4.11	Steady	19	0	Steady
IND	28,507	0.92	▼0.57	11	0	Steady
NOTA	29,155	0.94	New entry			
Total	30,98,500	100%	-	38	4	-

=== Jammu and Kashmir (6) ===
BJP (3)	JKPDP (3)

Alliance/ Party		Popular vote			Seats		
Alliance/ Party		Votes	%	±pp	Contested	Won	+/−
BJP		11,54,220	32.36	▲13.75	6	3	▲3
JKPDP		7,32,644	20.54	▲0.49	5	3	▲3
UPA	INC	8,15,510	22.85	▼1.82	3	0	▼2
UPA	JKNC	3,96,713	11.12	▼7.99	3	0	▼3
UPA	Total	12,12,223	33.99	▼9.79	6	0	▼5
Others		2,12,728	5.96	Steady	28	0	Steady
IND		2,23,498	6.27	▼0.01	33	0	▼1
NOTA		31,550	0.88	Steady			
Total		35,66,863	100%	-	78	6	-

=== Jharkhand (14) ===
BJP (12)	JMM (2)

Alliance/ Party		Popular vote			Seats		
Alliance/ Party		Votes	%	±pp	Contested	Won	+/−
NDA	BJP	52,07,439	40.11	▲12.58	14	12	▲4
UPA	INC	17,24,740	13.28	▼1.74	9	0	▼1
UPA	JMM	12,05,031	9.28	▼2.42	4	2	Steady
UPA	RJD	2,12,571	1.64	▼3.69	1	0	Steady
UPA	Total	31,42,342	24.20	▼2.52	14	2	▼1
JVM(P)		15,67,655	12.07	▲1.59	14	0	▼1
AJSU		4,81,667	3.71	▲1.52	9	0	Steady
AITC		3,06,332	2.36	Steady	10	0	Steady
Others		16,60,354	12.79	Steady	102	0	Steady
IND		4,26,224	3.28	▼7.84	77	0	▼2
NOTA		1,90,927	1.47	Steady			
Total		1,29,82,940	100%	-	240	14	-

=== Karnataka (28) ===
BJP (17)	JD(S) (2)	INC (9)

Party Name	Popular vote			Seats		
Party Name	Votes	%	±pp	Contested	Won	+/−
BJP	1,33,50,285	43.01	▲1.38	28	17	▼2
INC	1,26,66,530	40.81	▲3.16	28	9	▲3
JD(S)	34,06,465	10.97	▼2.60	25	2	▼1
Others	8,74,187	2.82	Steady	157	0	Steady
IND	4,83,513	1.56	▼2.56	196	0	Steady
NOTA	2,57,881	0.83	Steady			
Total	3,10,38,861	100%	-	434	28	-

=== Kerala (20) ===
INC (8)	IUML (2)	KC(M) (1)	RSP (1)	CPI(M) (5)	CPI (1)	IND (2)

Alliance/Party		Popular vote			Seats		
Alliance/Party		Votes	%	±pp	Contested	Won	+/−
UDF	INC	5,590,285	31.10%	▼9.04%	15	8	▼5
UDF	IUML	816,226	4.54%	▼0.54%	2	2	Steady
UDF	KC(M)	424,194	2.36%	▼0.17%	1	1	Steady
UDF	RSP	408,528	2.27%	New	1	1	▲1
UDF	SJ(D)	307,597	1.71%	New	1	0	New
UDF	Total	7,546,830	41.98 %	▼5.75%	20	12	▼4
LDF	CPI(M)	3,880,655	21.59%	▼8.89%	10	5	▲1
LDF	LDF Ind.	1,662,997	9.25%	▲4.24%	6	2	▲2
LDF	CPI	1,364,010	7.59%	▲0.15%	4	1	▲1
LDF	JD(S)	303,595	1.69%	▲1.69%	1	0	New
LDF	Total	7,211,257	40.12%	▼1.77%	20	8	▲5
NDA	BJP	1,856,750	10.33%	▲4.02%	18	0	Steady
NDA	KC(N)	44,357	0.25%	New	1	0	Steady
NDA	RSP(B)	43,051	0.24%	New	1	0	Steady
NDA	Total	1,944,158	10.82%	▲4.39%	20	0	Steady
Others		1,273,648	7.08%				
Total		17,975,893	100%	▲0.51%		20	

=== Lakshadweep (1) ===
NCP (1)

Name of Party	Vote Share %	Change	Seats won	Changes
Nationalist Congress Party	50.10%	+3.79	1	+1
Indian National Congress	46.60%	-5.32	0	-1

=== Madhya Pradesh (29) ===
BJP (27)	INC (2)

Parties	Seats			Popular vote		
Parties	Contested	Won	+/−	Votes	%	±pp
Bharatiya Janata Party	29	27	▲11	1,60,15,685	54.8%	▲11.4%
Indian National Congress	29	2	▼10	1,03,40,274	35.4%	▼4.7%
Bahujan Samaj Party	29	0	▼1	11,24,772	3.8%	▼2.1%
Total	29			2,92,47,970		

=== Maharashtra (48) ===
BJP (22)	SS (18)	SWP (1)	NCP (4)	INC (3)

Alliance/ Party		Popular vote			Seats		
Alliance/ Party		Votes	%	±pp	Contested	Won	+/−
NDA	BJP	1,33,08,961	27.32	▲8.61	24	23	▲14
NDA	SHS	1,00,50,652	20.63	▲3.63	20	18	▲7
NDA	SWP	11,05,073	2.27	▲0.97	2	1	Steady
NDA	RSPS	4,51,843	0.93	Steady	1	0	Steady
NDA	RPI(A)	71,808	0.15	▼0.46	1	0	Steady
NDA	Total	2,49,88,337	51.29	▲15.20	48	42	▲21
UPA	INC	88,30,190	18.13	▼1.48	26	4	▼4
UPA	NCP	77,82,275	15.97	▼3.31	21	2	▼15
UPA	BVA	2,93,681	0.60	Steady	1	0	▼1
UPA	Total	1,69,06,146	34.70	▼5.48	48	6	▼19
BSP		12,71,680	2.61	▼2.22	48	0	Steady
AAP		10,88,997	2.24	New entry	48	0	Steady
MNS		7,08,010	1.45	▼2.62	10	0	Steady
PWPI		4,97,721	1.02		3	0	
BBM		3,60,854	0.74	▼0.59	23	0	Steady
CPI(M)		1,81,629	0.37		4	0	
Others		7,03,760	1.44	Steady	221	0	Steady
IND		15,77,114	3.24		444	0	▼1
NOTA		4,33,171	0.89	New entry			
Total		4,87,17,419	100%	-	897	48	-

=== Manipur (2) ===
INC (2)

Party Name	Popular vote			Seats		
Party Name	Votes	%	±pp	Contested	Won	+/−
INC	5,88,872	41.69	▼1.27	2	2	Steady
NPF	2,81,133	19.90	New entry	1	0	Steady
CPI	1,97,428	13.98	▼0.95	1	0	Steady
BJP	1,68,272	11.91	▲2.42	2	0	Steady
NCP	61,662	4.37	▼1.59	1	0	Steady
AITC	52,655	3.73	New entry	2	0	Steady
AAP	7,604	0.54	New entry	2	0	Steady
IND	43,013	3.04	▲1.31	4	0	Steady
NOTA	7,504	0.53	Steady			
Total	14,12,636	100%	-	18	2	-

=== Meghalaya (2) ===
NPP (1)	INC (1)

Party Name	Popular vote			Seats		
Party Name	Votes	%	±pp	Contested	Won	+/−
INC	4,08,925	37.93	▼6.91	2	1	Steady
NPEP	2,39,301	22.20	New	1	1	▲1
UDP	1,06,817	9.91	▼5.21	1	0	Steady
BJP	95,979	8.90	Steady	1	0	Steady
AAP	8,815	0.82	Steady	1	0	Steady
CPI	7,418	0.69	▼0.14	1	0	Steady
IND	1,80,658	16.76	▲14.17	3	0	Steady
NOTA	30,145	2.80	Steady	2	Steady	Steady
Total	10,78,058	100%	-	10	2	-

=== Mizoram (1) ===
INC (1)

Name of Party	Vote Share %	Change	Seats won	Changes
Indian National Congress	48.60%	+16.98	1	0

=== Nagaland (1) ===
NPF (1)

Name of Party	Vote Share %	Change	Seats won	Changes
Naga People's Front (NDA)	68.70%	-1.26	1	0
Indian National Congress	30.10%			0

=== Odisha (21) ===
BJD (20)	BJP (1)

Party Name	Popular vote			Seats		
Party Name	Votes	%	±pp	Contested	Won	+/−
BJD	94,89,946	44.08	▲6.85	21	20	▲6
INC	55,91,380	25.97	▼6.78	21	0	▼6
BJP	46,38,565	21.55	▲4.66	21	1	▲1
JMM	1,72,984	0.80	Steady	1	0	Steady
AAP	1,47,888	0.69	Steady	18	0	Steady
BSP	2,18,403	1.01	Steady	21	0	Steady
Others	4,54,673	2.11	Steady	47	0	Steady
IND	3,33,196	1.55	▼0.78	32	0	Steady
Total	2,15,28,883	100%	-	196	21	-

=== Puducherry (1) ===
All India N R Congress (1)

Name of Party	Vote Share %	Change	Seats won	Changes
All India N.R. Congress (NDA)	34.60%	+0	1	+1
Indian National Congress	26.3%	-23.16%	0	-1

=== Punjab (13) ===
BJP (2)	SAD (4)	AAP (4)	INC (3)

Alliance/ Party		Popular vote			Seats		
Alliance/ Party		Votes	%	±pp	Contested	Won	+/−
NDA	SAD	3,636,148	26.26	▼7.59	10	4	Steady
NDA	BJP	1,209,004	8.73	▼1.33	3	2	▲1
NDA	Total	4,845,152	34.99	▼8.92	13	6	▲1
UPA	INC	4,575,879	33.05	▼12.18	13	3	▼5
AAP		3,373,062	24.36	▲24.36	13	4	▲4
Others		494,246	3.60	Steady	96	0	Steady
IND		498,039	3.60	▲1.28	118	0	Steady
Total		13,845,132	100	-	253	13	-

=== Rajasthan (25) ===
BJP (25)

Party Name	Popular vote			Seats		
Party Name	Votes	%	±pp	Contested	Won	+/−
BJP	1,48,95,106	54.94	▲18.37	25	25	▲21
INC	82,30,164	30.36	▼16.83	25	0	▼20
BSP	6,33,786	2.34	▼1.03	23	0	Steady
NPEP	3,25,334	1.20	New entry	4	0	Steady
AAP	2,72,641	1.01	New entry	22	0	Steady
Others	6,18,983	2.28	Steady	104	0	Steady
IND	18,06,700	6.66	▼2.65	117	0	▼1
NOTA	3,27,911	1.21	New entry			
Total	2,71,10,642	100%	-	320	25	-

=== Sikkim (1) ===
SDF (1)

Name of Party	Vote Share %	Change	Seats won	Changes
Sikkim Democratic Front	53.00%	-13.30	1	0
Sikkim Krantikari Morcha	39.50%	+39.50%	0	0
Bharatiya Janata Party	2.40%	+0.59	0	0
Indian National Congress	2.30%	-27.26%	0	0

=== Tamil Nadu (39) ===
AIADMK (37)	PMK (1)	BJP (1)

Party		Popular vote			Seats		
Party		Votes	%	±pp	Contested	Won	+/−
All India Anna Dravida Munnetra Kazhagam		17,978,922	44.92	▲22.01	39	37	▲28
NDA	Bharatiya Janata Party	2,223,566	5.56	▲3.21	9	1	▲1
NDA	Pattali Makkal Katchi	1,804,812	4.51	▼1.21	8	1	▲1
NDA	Desiya Murpokku Dravida Kazhagam	2,078,843	5.19	▼4.89	14	0	Steady
NDA	Marumalarchi Dravida Munnetra Kazhagam	1,417,535	3.54	▼0.12	7	0	▼1
NDA	Total	7,524,756	18.80	▼3.01	38	2	▲1
DPA	Dravida Munnetra Kazhagam	9,570,666	23.91	▼1.21	34	0	▼18
DPA	Viduthalai Chiruthaigal Katchi	606,110	1.51	▼0.90	2	0	▼1
DPA	Puthiya Tamilagam	262,812	0.66	▲0.26	1	0	Steady
DPA	Manithaneya Makkal Katchi	236,679	0.59	▲0.37	1	0	Steady
DPA	Indian Union Muslim League	205,896	0.51	Steady	1	0	Steady
DPA	Total	10,882,163	27.18	▼1.48	39	0	▼19
Indian National Congress		1,750,990	4.37	▼10.66	39	0	▼8
LSA	Communist Party of India (Marxist)	220,632	0.55	▼1.65	9	0	▼1
LSA	Communist Party of India	219,866	0.55	▼2.30	8	0	▼1
LSA	Total	440,498	1.10	▼3.95	17	0	▼2
Others		866,317	2.20	Steady	673	0	Steady
NOTA		581,782	1.43	Steady			
Total		40,025,367	100	N/A	845	39	N/A

=== Telangana (17) ===
TRS (11)	INC (2)	BJP (1)	TDP (1)	YSRCP (1)	AIMIM (1)

Name of Party	Vote Share %	Change	Seats won	Changes
Telangana Rashtra Samithi	33.90	+7.76	11	+9
Indian National Congress	20.5	-27.45	2	0
Bharatiya Janata Party	8.50	---	1	0
Telugu Desam Party	3.10	+4.17	1	0
YSR Congress Party	2.90	+2.90	1	0
All India Majlis-e-Ittehadul Muslimeen	1.40	-0.53	1	0

=== Tripura (2) ===
CPI(M) (2)

Party Name	Popular vote			Seats		
Party Name	Votes	%	±pp	Contested	Won	+/−
CPI(M)	12,95,436	64.01	▲2.32	2	2	Steady
INC	3,07,592	15.20	▼15.55	2	0	Steady
AITC	1,94,755	9.62	Steady	2	0	Steady
BJP	1,15,319	5.70	▲2.32	2	0	Steady
Others	69,180	3.42	Steady	13	0	Steady
IND	17,764	0.88	▼1.15	4	0	Steady
NOTA	23,783	1.18	Steady			
Total	20,23,829	100%	-	25	2	-

=== Uttar Pradesh (80) ===
BJP (71)	SP (5)	INC (2)	AD (2)

Alliance/ Party		Popular vote			Seats		
Alliance/ Party		Votes	%	±pp	Contested	Won	+/−
NDA	BJP	3,43,18,854	42.63	▲24.82	78	71	▲61
NDA	AD	8,12,325	1.00	Steady	2	2	▲2
NDA	Total	3,51,31,179	43.65	Steady	80	73	▲63
SP		1,79,88,967	22.18	▼1.08	78	5	▼18
BSP		1,59,14,194	19.62	▼7.80	80	0	▼20
UPA	INC	60,61,267	7.47	▼10.78	67	2	▼19
UPA	RLD	6,89,409	0.85	▼2.42	8	0	▼5
UPA	MD	22,774	0.03	▼0.16	3	0	Steady
UPA	Total	67,73,450	8.35	Steady	78	2	▼24
Others		32,78,130	4.04	Steady	599	0	Steady
IND		14,14,869	1.74	Steady	373	0	Steady
NOTA		5,92,331	0.73	Steady			
Total		8,10,93,120	100%	-	1,288	80	-

=== Uttarakhand (5) ===
BJP (5)

Party Name	Popular vote			Seats		
Party Name	Votes	%	±pp	Contested	Won	+/−
BJP	24,29,698	55.32	▲21.52	5	5	▲5
INC	14,94,440	34.03	▼9.11	5	0	▼5
Others	3,43,551	7.82	Steady	37	0	Steady
IND	76,158	1.73	▼1.01	27	0	Steady
NOTA	48,043	1.09	Steady			
Total	43,91,890	100%	-	73	5	-

=== West Bengal (42) ===
AITC (34)	BJP (2)	INC (4)	CPI(M) (2)

Alliance/ Party		Popular vote			Seats		
Alliance/ Party		Votes	%	±pp	Contested	Won	+/−
AITC		20,316,262	39.35	▲8.17	42	34	▲15
INC		4,946,911	9.58	▼3.87	42	4	▼2
BJP		8,692,297	16.84	▲10.70	42	2	▲1
LF	CPI(M)	11,723,166	22.71	▼10.39	32	2	▼7
LF	RSP	1,255,794	2.43	▼1.13	4	0	▼2
LF	CPI	1,202,785	2.33	▼1.27	3	0	▼2
LF	AIFB	1,106,038	2.14	▼0.90	3	0	▼2
LF	Total	15,287,783	29.61	▼13.69	42	2	▼13
Others		1,344,281	2.60	Steady	221	0	Steady
IND		473,000	0.92	▼2.16	83	0	
NOTA		571,294	1.11	New entry			
Total		51,631,828	100%	–	472	42	–

== Results by constituency ==
State	Parliamentary Constituency			Winner			Runner-up			Margin
State	No.	Name	Type	Candidate	Party	Votes	Candidate	Party	Votes	Margin
Andaman and Nicobar Islands	1	Andaman and Nicobar Islands	GEN	Bishnu Pada Ray	Bharatiya Janata Party	90969	Kuldeep Rai Sharma	Indian National Congress	83157	7812
Andhra Pradesh	1	Adilabad	(ST)	Godam Nagesh	Telangana Rashtra Samithi	430847	Naresh	Indian National Congress	259557	171290
Andhra Pradesh	2	Peddapalle	(SC)	Balka Suman	Telangana Rashtra Samithi	565496	G. Vivekanand	Indian National Congress	274338	291158
Andhra Pradesh	3	Karimnagar	GEN	Vinod Kumar Boinapally	Telangana Rashtra Samithi	505783	Ponnam Prabhakar	Indian National Congress	300706	205077
Andhra Pradesh	4	Nizamabad	GEN	Kalvakuntla Kavitha	Telangana Rashtra Samithi	439307	Madhu Yaskhi Goud	Indian National Congress	272123	167184
Andhra Pradesh	5	Zahirabad	GEN	B.B. Patil	Telangana Rashtra Samithi	508661	Suresh Kumar Shetkar	Indian National Congress	364030	144631
Andhra Pradesh	6	Medak	GEN	K. Chandrashekar Rao	Telangana Rashtra Samithi	6,57,492	P Shravan Kumar Reddy	Indian National Congress	2,60,463	3,97,029
Andhra Pradesh	7	Malkajgiri	GEN	Ch.Malla Reddy	Telugu Desam Party	523336	Hanumanth Rao Mynampally	Telangana Rashtra Samithi	494965	28371
Andhra Pradesh	8	Secunderabad	GEN	Bandaru Dattatreya	Bharatiya Janata Party	438271	M.Anjan Kumar Yadav	Indian National Congress	183536	254735
Andhra Pradesh	9	Hyderabad	GEN	Asaduddin Owaisi	All India Majlis-e-Ittehadul Muslimeen	513868	Dr.Bhagavanth Rao	Bharatiya Janata Party	311414	202454
Andhra Pradesh	10	Chevella	GEN	Konda Vishweshwar Reddy	Telangana Rashtra Samithi	435077	Patlolla Kartik Reddy	Indian National Congress	362054	73023
Andhra Pradesh	11	Mahabubnagar	GEN	Ap Jithender Reddy	Telangana Rashtra Samithi	334228	Jaipal Reddy Sudini	Indian National Congress	331638	2590
Andhra Pradesh	12	Nagarkurnool	(SC)	Yellaiah Nandi	Indian National Congress	420075	Dr. Manda Jagannath	Telangana Rashtra Samithi	403399	16676
Andhra Pradesh	13	Nalgonda	GEN	Gutha Sukhender Reddy	Indian National Congress	472093	Tera Chinnapa Reddy	Telugu Desam Party	278937	193156
Andhra Pradesh	14	Bhongir	GEN	Dr. Boora Narsaiah Goud	Telangana Rashtra Samithi	448245	Komatireddy Rajgopal Reddy	Indian National Congress	417751	30494
Andhra Pradesh	15	Warangal	(SC)	Kadiyam Srihari	Telangana Rashtra Samithi	661639	Rajaiah Siricilla	Indian National Congress	269065	392574
Andhra Pradesh	16	Mahabubabad	(ST)	Prof. Azmeera Seetaram Naik	Telangana Rashtra Samithi	320569	P. Balram	Indian National Congress	285577	34992
Andhra Pradesh	17	Khammam	GEN	Ponguleti Srinivasa Reddy	YSR Congress Party	421957	Nama Nageswara Rao	Telugu Desam Party	409983	11974
Andhra Pradesh	18	Araku	(ST)	Kothapalli Geetha	YSR Congress Party	413191	Gummidi Sandhyarani	Telugu Desam Party	321793	91398
Andhra Pradesh	19	Srikakulam	GEN	Ram Mohan Naidu Kinjarapu	Telugu Desam Party	556163	Reddy Shanthi	YSR Congress Party	428591	127572
Andhra Pradesh	20	Vizianagaram	GEN	Pusapati Ashok Gajapathi Raju	Telugu Desam Party	536549	V.S.K Rangarao Ravu	YSR Congress Party	429638	106911
Andhra Pradesh	21	Visakhapatnam	GEN	Kambhampati Hari Babu	Bharatiya Janata Party	566832	Y. S. Vijayamma	YSR Congress Party	476344	90488
Andhra Pradesh	22	Anakapalli	GEN	Muttamsetti Srinivasa Rao	Telugu Desam Party	568463	Gudivada Amarnadh	YSR Congress Party	520531	47932
Andhra Pradesh	23	Kakinada	GEN	Thota Narasimham	Telugu Desam Party	5,14,402	Chalamalasetty Sunil	YSR Congress Party	5,10,971	3,431
Andhra Pradesh	24	Amalapuram	(SC)	Pandula Ravindra Babu	Telugu Desam Party	5,94,547	Pinipe Viswarup	YSR Congress Party	4,73,971	1,20,576
Andhra Pradesh	25	Rajahmundry	GEN	Maganti Murali Mohan	Telugu Desam Party	6,30,573	Boddu Venkata Ramana Chowdary	YSR Congress Party	4,63,139	1,67,434
Andhra Pradesh	26	Narasapuram	GEN	Gokaraju Ganga Raju	Bharatiya Janata Party	540306	Vanka Ravindranath	YSR Congress Party	4,54,955	85,351
Andhra Pradesh	27	Eluru	GEN	Maganti Venkateswara Rao	Telugu Desam Party	6,23,471	Thota Chandra Sekhar	YSR Congress Party	5,21,545	1,01,926
Andhra Pradesh	28	Machilipatnam	GEN	Konakalla Narayana Rao	Telugu Desam Party	5,87,280	Kolusu Parthasarathy	YSR Congress Party	5,06,223	81,057
Andhra Pradesh	29	Vijayawada	GEN	Kesineni Srinivas	Telugu Desam Party	5,92,696	Koneru Rajendra Prasad	YSR Congress Party	5,17,834	74,862
Andhra Pradesh	30	Guntur	GEN	Galla Jayadev	Telugu Desam Party	6,18,417	Vallabhaneni Balasouri	YSR Congress Party	5,49,306	69,111
Andhra Pradesh	31	Narasaraopet	GEN	Rayapati Sambasiva Rao	Telugu Desam Party	6,32,464	Alla Ayodhya Rami Reddy	YSR Congress Party	5,97,184	35,280
Andhra Pradesh	32	Bapatla	(SC)	Malyadri Sriram	Telugu Desam Party	5,78,145	Varikuti Amruthapani	YSR Congress Party	5,45,391	32,754
Andhra Pradesh	33	Ongole	GEN	Y. V. Subba Reddy	YSR Congress Party	5,89,960	Magunta Sreenivasulu Reddy	Telugu Desam Party	5,74,302	15,658
Andhra Pradesh	34	Nandyal	GEN	S. P. Y. Reddy	YSR Congress Party	6,22,411	N. M. D. Farooq	Telugu Desam Party	5,16,645	1,05,766
Andhra Pradesh	35	Kurnool	GEN	Butta Renuka	YSR Congress Party	4,72,782	B. T. Naidu	Telugu Desam Party	4,28,651	44,131
Andhra Pradesh	36	Anantapur	GEN	J. C. Diwakar Reddy	Telugu Desam Party	6,06,509	Anantha Venkatarami Reddy	YSR Congress Party	5,45,240	61,269
Andhra Pradesh	37	Hindupur	GEN	Kristappa Nimmala	Telugu Desam Party	6,04,291	Duddukunta Sreedhar Reddy	YSR Congress Party	5,06Z966	97,325
Andhra Pradesh	38	Kadapa	GEN	Y. S. Avinash Reddy	YSR Congress Party	6,71,983	Srinivasa Reddy Reddeppagari	Telugu Desam Party	4,81,660	1,90,323
Andhra Pradesh	39	Nellore	GEN	Mekapati Rajamohan Reddy	YSR Congress Party	5,76,396	Adala Prabhakara Reddy	Telugu Desam Party	5,62,918	13,478
Andhra Pradesh	40	Tirupati	(SC)	Varaprasad Rao Velagapalli	YSR Congress Party	5,80,376	Karumanchi Jayaram	Bharatiya Janata Party	5,42,951	37,425
Andhra Pradesh	41	Rajampet	GEN	P. V. Midhun Reddy	YSR Congress Party	6,01,752	Daggubati Purandeswari	Bharatiya Janata Party	4,26,990	1,74,762
Andhra Pradesh	42	Chittoor	(SC)	Naramalli Sivaprasad	Telugu Desam Party	5,94,862	G Samanya Kiran	YSR Congress Party	5,50,724	44,138
Arunachal Pradesh	1	Arunachal West	(ST)	Kiren Rijiju	Bharatiya Janata Party	1,69,367	Takam Sanjoy	Indian National Congress	1,27,629	41,738
Arunachal Pradesh	2	Arunachal East	(ST)	Ninong Ering	Indian National Congress	1,18,455	Tapir Gao	Bharatiya Janata Party	1,05,977	12,478
Assam	1	Karimganj	(SC)	Radheshyam Biswas	All India United Democratic Front	3,62,866	Krishna Das	Bharatiya Janata Party	2,60,772	1,02,094
Assam	2	Silchar	GEN	Sushmita Dev	Indian National Congress	3,36,451	Kabindra Purkayastha	Bharatiya Janata Party	3,01,210	35,241
Assam	3	Autonomous District	(ST)	Biren Singh Engti	Indian National Congress	2,13,152	Joyram Engleng	Bharatiya Janata Party	1,89,057	24,095
Assam	4	Dhubri	GEN	Badruddin Ajmal	All India United Democratic Front	5,92,569	Wazed Ali Choudhury	Indian National Congress	3,62,839	2,29,730
Assam	5	Kokrajhar	(ST)	Naba Kumar Sarania	Independent	6,34,428	Urkhao Gwra Brahma	Independent	2,78,649	3,55,779
Assam	6	Barpeta	GEN	Sirajuddin Ajmal	All India United Democratic Front	3,94,702	Chandra Mohan Patowary	Bharatiya Janata Party	3,52,361	42,341
Assam	7	Gauhati	GEN	Bijoya Chakravarty	Bharatiya Janata Party	7,64,985	Manash Borah	Indian National Congress	4,49,201	3,15,784
Assam	8	Mangaldoi	GEN	Ramen Deka	Bharatiya Janata Party	4,86,357	Kirip Chaliha	Indian National Congress	4,63,473	22,884
Assam	9	Tezpur	GEN	Ram Prasad Sharma	Bharatiya Janata Party	4,46,511	Bhupen Kumar Borah	Indian National Congress	3,60,491	86,020
Assam	10	Nowgong	GEN	Rajen Gohain	Bharatiya Janata Party	4,94,146	Jonjonali Baruah	Indian National Congress	3,50,587	1,43,559
Assam	11	Kaliabor	GEN	Gourav Gogoi	Indian National Congress	4,43,315	Mrinal Saikia	Bharatiya Janata Party	3,49,441	93,874
Assam	12	Jorhat	GEN	Kamakhya Prasad Tasa	Bharatiya Janata Party	4,56,420	Bijoy Krishna Handique	Indian National Congress	3,54,000	1,02,420
Assam	13	Dibrugarh	(ST)	Rameswar Teli	Bharatiya Janata Party	4,94,364	Paban Singh Ghatowar	Indian National Congress	3,09,017	1,85,347
Assam	14	Lakhimpur	GEN	Sarbananda Sonowal	Bharatiya Janata Party	6,12,543	Ranee Narah	Indian National Congress	3,20,405	2,92,138
Bihar	1	Valmiki Nagar	GEN	Satish Chandra Dubey	Bharatiya Janata Party	3,64,013	Purnmasi Ram	Indian National Congress	2,46,218	1,17,795
Bihar	2	Paschim Champaran	GEN	Sanjay Jaiswal	Bharatiya Janata Party	3,71,232	Prakash Jha	Janata Dal (United)	2,60,978	1,10,254
Bihar	3	Purvi Champaran	GEN	Radha Mohan Singh	Bharatiya Janata Party	4,00,452	Binod Kumar Srivastava	Rashtriya Janata Dal	2,08,289	1,92,163
Bihar	4	Sheohar	GEN	Rama Devi	Bharatiya Janata Party	3,72,506	Md Anwarul Haque	Rashtriya Janata Dal	2,36,267	1,36,239
Bihar	5	Sitamarhi	GEN	Ram Kumar Sharma	Rashtriya Lok Samta Party	4,11,265	Sitaram Yadav	Rashtriya Janata Dal	2,63,300	1,47,965
Bihar	6	Madhubani	GEN	Hukm Deo Narayan Yadav	Bharatiya Janata Party	3,58,040	Abdul Bari Siddiqui	Rashtriya Janata Dal	3,37,505	20,535
Bihar	7	Jhanjharpur	GEN	Birendra Kumar Chaudhary	Bharatiya Janata Party	3,35,481	Mangani Lal Mandal	Rashtriya Janata Dal	2,80,073	55,408
Bihar	8	Supaul	GEN	Ranjeet Ranjan	Indian National Congress	3,32,927	Dileshwar Kamait	Janata Dal (United)	2,73,255	59,672
Bihar	9	Araria	GEN	Tasleem Uddin	Rashtriya Janata Dal	4,07,978	Pradeep Kumar Singh	Bharatiya Janata Party	2,61,474	1,46,504
Bihar	10	Kishanganj	GEN	Mohammad Asrarul Haque	Indian National Congress	4,93,461	Dilip Kumar Jaiswal	Bharatiya Janata Party	2,98,849	1,94,612
Bihar	11	Katihar	GEN	Tariq Anwar	Nationalist Congress Party	4,31,292	Nikhil Kumar Choudhary	Bharatiya Janata Party	3,16,552	1,14,740
Bihar	12	Purnia	GEN	Santosh Kumar	Janata Dal (United)	4,18,826	Uday Singh	Bharatiya Janata Party	3,02,157	1,16,669
Bihar	13	Madhepura	GEN	Rajesh Ranjan	Rashtriya Janata Dal	3,68,937	Sharad Yadav	Janata Dal (United)	3,12,728	56,209
Bihar	14	Darbhanga	GEN	Kirti Azad	Bharatiya Janata Party	3,14,949	Mohammad Ali Ashraf Fatmi	Rashtriya Janata Dal	2,79,906	35,043
Bihar	15	Muzaffarpur	GEN	Ajay Nishad	Bharatiya Janata Party	4,69,295	Akhilesh Prasad Singh	Indian National Congress	2,46,873	2,22,422
Bihar	16	Vaishali	GEN	Rama Kishore Singh	Lok Janshakti Party	3,05,450	Raghuvansh Prasad Singh	Rashtriya Janata Dal	2,06,183	99,267
Bihar	17	Gopalganj	(SC)	Janak Ram	Bharatiya Janata Party	4,78,773	Jyoti Bharti	Indian National Congress	1,91,837	2,86,936
Bihar	18	Siwan	GEN	Om Prakash Yadav	Bharatiya Janata Party	3,72,670	Hena Shahab	Rashtriya Janata Dal	2,58,823	1,13,847
Bihar	19	Maharajganj	GEN	Janardan Singh Sigriwal	Bharatiya Janata Party	3,20,753	Prabhunath Singh	Rashtriya Janata Dal	2,82,338	38,415
Bihar	20	Saran	GEN	Rajiv Pratap Rudy	Bharatiya Janata Party	3,55,120	Rabri Devi	Rashtriya Janata Dal	3,14,172	40,948
Bihar	21	Hajipur	(SC)	Ram Vilas Paswan	Lok Janshakti Party	4,55,652	Sanjeev Prasad Toni	Indian National Congress	2,30,152	2,25,500
Bihar	22	Ujiarpur	GEN	Nityanand Rai	Bharatiya Janata Party	3,17,352	Alok Kumar Mehta	Rashtriya Janata Dal	2,56,883	60,469
Bihar	23	Samastipur	(SC)	Ram Chandra Paswan	Lok Janshakti Party	2,70,401	Ashok Kumar	Indian National Congress	2,63,529	6,872
Bihar	24	Begusarai	GEN	Bhola Singh	Bharatiya Janata Party	4,28,227	Md. Tanveer Hassan	Rashtriya Janata Dal	3,69,892	58,335
Bihar	25	Khagaria	GEN	Mehboob Ali Kaiser	Lok Janshakti Party	3,13,806	Krishna Kumari Yadav	Rashtriya Janata Dal	2,37,803	76,003
Bihar	26	Bhagalpur	GEN	Shailesh Kumar Mandal	Rashtriya Janata Dal	3,67,623	Syed Shahnawaz Hussain	Bharatiya Janata Party	3,58,138	9,485
Bihar	27	Banka	GEN	Jay Prakash Narayan Yadav	Rashtriya Janata Dal	2,85,150	Putul Kumari	Bharatiya Janata Party	2,75,006	10,144
Bihar	28	Munger	GEN	Veena Devi	Lok Janshakti Party	3,52,911	Rajiv Ranjan Singh	Janata Dal (United)	2,43,827	1,09,084
Bihar	29	Nalanda	GEN	Kaushalendra Kumar	Janata Dal (United)	3,21,982	Satya Nand Sharma	Lok Janshakti Party	3,12,355	9,627
Bihar	30	Patna Sahib	GEN	Shatrughan Sinha	Bharatiya Janata Party	4,85,905	Kunal Singh	Indian National Congress	2,20,100	2,65,805
Bihar	31	Pataliputra	GEN	Ram Kripal Yadav	Bharatiya Janata Party	3,83,262	Misa Bharti	Rashtriya Janata Dal	3,42,940	40,322
Bihar	32	Arrah	GEN	R. K. Singh	Bharatiya Janata Party	3,91,074	Sribhagwan Singh Kushwaha	Rashtriya Janata Dal	2,55,204	1,35,870
Bihar	33	Buxar	GEN	Ashwini Kumar Choubey	Bharatiya Janata Party	3,19,012	Jagada Nand Singh	Rashtriya Janata Dal	1,86,674	1,32,338
Bihar	34	Sasaram	(SC)	Chhedi Paswan	Bharatiya Janata Party	3,66,087	Meira Kumar	Indian National Congress	3,02,760	63,327
Bihar	35	Karakat	GEN	Upendra Kushwaha	Rashtriya Lok Samta Party	3,38,892	Kanti Singh	Rashtriya Janata Dal	2,33,651	1,05,241
Bihar	36	Jahanabad	GEN	Arun Kumar	Rashtriya Lok Samta Party	3,22,647	Surendra Prasad Yadav	Rashtriya Janata Dal	2,80,307	42,340
Bihar	37	Aurangabad	GEN	Sushil Kumar Singh	Bharatiya Janata Party	3,07,941	Nikhil Kumar	Indian National Congress	2,41,594	66,347
Bihar	38	Gaya	(SC)	Hari Manjhi	Bharatiya Janata Party	3,26,230	Ramji Manjhi	Rashtriya Janata Dal	2,10,726	1,15,504
Bihar	39	Nawada	GEN	Giriraj Singh	Bharatiya Janata Party	3,90,248	Raj Ballabh Prasad	Rashtriya Janata Dal	2,50,091	1,40,157
Bihar	40	Jamui	(SC)	Chirag Paswan	Lok Janshakti Party	2,85,354	Sudhansu Shekhar Bhaskar	Rashtriya Janata Dal	1,99,407	85,947
Chandigarh	1	Chandigarh	GEN	Kirron Kher	Bharatiya Janata Party	1,91,362	Pawan Kumar Bansal	Indian National Congress	1,21,720	69,642
Chhattisgarh	1	Sarguja	(ST)	Kamalbhan Singh Marabi	Bharatiya Janata Party	5,85,336	Ram Dev Ram	Indian National Congress	4,38,100	1,47,236
Chhattisgarh	2	Raigarh	(ST)	Vishnu Deo Sai	Bharatiya Janata Party	6,62,478	Arti Singh	Indian National Congress	4,45,728	2,16,750
Chhattisgarh	3	Janjgir-Champa	(SC)	Kamla Patle	Bharatiya Janata Party	5,18,909	Prem Chand Jayasi	Indian National Congress	3,43,948	1,74,961
Chhattisgarh	4	Korba	GEN	Banshilal Mahto	Bharatiya Janata Party	4,39,002	Charan Das Mahant	Indian National Congress	4,34,737	4,265
Chhattisgarh	5	Bilaspur	GEN	Lakhan Lal Sahu	Bharatiya Janata Party	5,61,387	Karuna Shukla	Indian National Congress	3,84,951	1,76,436
Chhattisgarh	6	Rajnandgaon	GEN	Abhishek Singh	Bharatiya Janata Party	6,43,473	Kamleshwar Verma	Indian National Congress	4,07,562	2,35,911
Chhattisgarh	7	Durg	GEN	Tamradhwaj Sahu	Indian National Congress	5,70,687	Saroj Pandey	Bharatiya Janata Party	5,53,839	16,848
Chhattisgarh	8	Raipur	GEN	Ramesh Bais	Bharatiya Janata Party	6,54,922	Satya Narayan Sharma	Indian National Congress	4,83,276	1,71,646
Chhattisgarh	9	Mahasamund	GEN	Chandu Lal Sahu	Bharatiya Janata Party	5,03,514	Ajit Jogi	Indian National Congress	5,02,297	1,217
Chhattisgarh	10	Bastar	(ST)	Dinesh Kashyap	Bharatiya Janata Party	3,85,829	Deepak Karma	Indian National Congress	2,61,470	1,24,359
Chhattisgarh	11	Kanker	(ST)	Vikram Usendi	Bharatiya Janata Party	4,65,215	Foolodevi Netam	Indian National Congress	4,30,057	35,158
Dadra and Nagar Haveli	1	Dadra and Nagar Haveli	(ST)	Natubhai Gomanbhai Patel	Bharatiya Janata Party	80,790	Mohanbhai Sanjibhai Delkar	Indian National Congress	74,576	6,214
Daman and Diu	1	Daman and Diu	GEN	Lalubhai Patel	Bharatiya Janata Party	46,960	Ketan Patel	Indian National Congress	37,738	9,222
Delhi	1	Chandni Chowk	GEN	Harsh Vardhan	Bharatiya Janata Party	4,37,938	Ashutosh	Aam Aadmi Party	3,01,618	1,36,320
Delhi	2	North East Delhi	GEN	Manoj Tiwari	Bharatiya Janata Party	5,96,125	Anand Kumar	Aam Aadmi Party	4,52,041	1,44,084
Delhi	3	East Delhi	GEN	Maheish Girri	Bharatiya Janata Party	5,72,202	Rajmohan Gandhi	Aam Aadmi Party	3,81,739	1,90,463
Delhi	4	New Delhi	GEN	Meenakshi Lekhi	Bharatiya Janata Party	4,53,350	Ashish Khetan	Aam Aadmi Party	2,90,642	1,62,708
Delhi	5	North West Delhi	(SC)	Udit Raj	Bharatiya Janata Party	6,29,860	Rakhi Birla	Aam Aadmi Party	5,23,058	1,06,802
Delhi	6	West Delhi	GEN	Parvesh Verma	Bharatiya Janata Party	6,51,395	Jarnail Singh	Aam Aadmi Party	3,82,809	2,68,586
Delhi	7	South Delhi	GEN	Ramesh Bidhuri	Bharatiya Janata Party	4,97,980	Devinder Sehrawat	Aam Aadmi Party	3,90,980	1,07,000
Goa	1	North Goa	GEN	Shripad Yesso Naik	Bharatiya Janata Party	2,37,903	Ravi Naik	Indian National Congress	1,32,304	1,05,599
Goa	2	South Goa	GEN	Narendra Keshav Sawaikar	Bharatiya Janata Party	1,98,776	Aleixo Lourenco	Indian National Congress	1,66,446	32,330
Gujarat	1	Kachchh	(SC)	Vinodbhai Chavda	Bharatiya Janata Party	5,62,855	Dinesh Parmar	Indian National Congress	3,08,373	2,54,482
Gujarat	2	Banaskantha	GEN	Haribhai Parthibhai Chaudhary	Bharatiya Janata Party	5,07,856	Patel Joitabhai Kasnabhai	Indian National Congress	3,05,522	2,02,334
Gujarat	3	Patan	GEN	Liladhar Vaghela	Bharatiya Janata Party	5,18,538	Bhavsinh Rathod	Indian National Congress	3,79,819	1,38,719
Gujarat	4	Mahesana	GEN	Jayshreeben Patel	Bharatiya Janata Party	5,80,250	Jivabhai Ambalal Patel	Indian National Congress	3,71,359	2,08,891
Gujarat	5	Sabarkantha	GEN	Dipsinh Rathod	Bharatiya Janata Party	552205	Shankersinh Vaghela	Indian National Congress	467750	84455
Gujarat	6	Gandhinagar	GEN	L. K. Advani	Bharatiya Janata Party	7,73,539	Kiritbhai Patel	Indian National Congress	2,90,418	4,83,121
Gujarat	7	Ahmedabad East	GEN	Paresh Rawal	Bharatiya Janata Party	6,33,582	Himmatsingh Prahladsingh Patel	Indian National Congress	3,06,949	3,26,633
Gujarat	8	Ahmedabad West	(SC)	Kirit Solanki	Bharatiya Janata Party	6,17,104	Ishwarbahi Makwana	Indian National Congress	2,96,793	3,20,311
Gujarat	9	Surendranagar	GEN	Devjibhai Fatepara	Bharatiya Janata Party	5,29,003	Somabhai Patel	Indian National Congress	3,26,096	2,02,907
Gujarat	10	Rajkot	GEN	Mohan Kundariya	Bharatiya Janata Party	6,21,524	Kunwarjibhai Bavaliya	Indian National Congress	3,75,096	2,46,428
Gujarat	11	Porbandar	GEN	Vitthal Radadiya	Bharatiya Janata Party	5,08,437	Kandhal Jadeja	Nationalist Congress Party	2,40,466	2,67,971
Gujarat	12	Jamnagar	GEN	Poonamben Maadam	Bharatiya Janata Party	4,84,412	Vikram Madam	Indian National Congress	3,09,123	1,75,289
Gujarat	13	Junagadh	GEN	Rajesh Chudasama	Bharatiya Janata Party	5,13,179	Punjabhai Vansh	Indian National Congress	3,77,347	1,35,832
Gujarat	14	Amreli	GEN	Naranbhai Kachhadia	Bharatiya Janata Party	4,36,715	Virjibhai Thummar	Indian National Congress	2,80,483	1,56,232
Gujarat	15	Bhavnagar	GEN	Bharti Shiyal	Bharatiya Janata Party	5,49,529	Pravinbhai Rathod	Indian National Congress	2,54,041	2,95,488
Gujarat	16	Anand	GEN	Dilip Patel	Bharatiya Janata Party	4,90,829	Bharatsinh Solanki	Indian National Congress	4,27,403	63,426
Gujarat	17	Kheda	GEN	Devusinh Chauhan	Bharatiya Janata Party	5,68,235	Dinsha Patel	Indian National Congress	3,35,334	2,32,901
Gujarat	18	Panchmahal	GEN	Prabhatsinh Chauhan	Bharatiya Janata Party	5,08,274	Ramsinh Parmar	Indian National Congress	3,37,678	1,70,596
Gujarat	19	Dahod	(ST)	Jasvantsinh Bhabhor	Bharatiya Janata Party	5,11,111	Prabha Kishor Taviad	Indian National Congress	2,80,757	230354
Gujarat	20	Vadodara	GEN	Narendra Modi	Bharatiya Janata Party	8,45,464	Madhusudan Mistry	Indian National Congress	2,75,336	5,70,128
Gujarat	21	Chhota Udaipur	(ST)	Ramsinh Rathwa	Bharatiya Janata Party	6,07,916	Naranbhai Rathwa	Indian National Congress	4,28,187	1,79,729
Gujarat	22	Bharuch	GEN	Mansukhbhai Vasava	Bharatiya Janata Party	5,48,902	Jayeshbhai Patel	Indian National Congress	3,95,629	1,53,273
Gujarat	23	Bardoli	(ST)	Parbhubhai Vasava	Bharatiya Janata Party	6,22,769	Tusharbhai Chaudhari	Indian National Congress	4,98,885	1,23,884
Gujarat	24	Surat	GEN	Darshana Jardosh	Bharatiya Janata Party	7,18,412	Naishadh Desai	Indian National Congress	1,85,222	5,33,190
Gujarat	25	Navsari	GEN	C. R. Patil	Bharatiya Janata Party	8,20,831	Maksud Mirza	Indian National Congress	2,62,715	5,58,116
Gujarat	26	Valsad	(ST)	K C Patel	Bharatiya Janata Party	6,17,772	Kishanbhai Patel	Indian National Congress	4,09,768	2,08,004
Haryana	1	Ambala	(SC)	Rattan Lal Kataria	Bharatiya Janata Party	6,12,121	Raj Kumar Balmiki	Indian National Congress	2,72,047	3,40,074
Haryana	2	Kurukshetra	GEN	Raj Kumar Saini	Bharatiya Janata Party	4,18,112	Balbir Singh Saini	Indian National Lok Dal	2,88,376	1,29,736
Haryana	3	Sirsa	(SC)	Charanjeet Singh Rori	Indian National Lok Dal	5,06,370	Ashok Tanwar	Indian National Congress	3,90,634	1,15,736
Haryana	4	Hisar	GEN	Dushyant Chautala	Indian National Lok Dal	4,94,478	Kuldeep Bishnoi	Haryana Janhit Congress (BL)	4,62,631	31,847
Haryana	5	Karnal	GEN	Ashwini Kumar Chopra	Bharatiya Janata Party	5,94,817	Arvind Kumar Sharma	Indian National Congress	2,34,670	3,60,147
Haryana	6	Sonipat	GEN	Ramesh Chander Kaushik	Bharatiya Janata Party	3,47,203	Jagbir Singh Malik	Indian National Congress	2,69,789	77,414
Haryana	7	Rohtak	GEN	Deepender Singh Hooda	Indian National Congress	4,90,063	Om Parkash Dhankar	Bharatiya Janata Party	3,19,436	1,70,627
Haryana	8	Bhiwani-Mahendragarh	GEN	Dharambir Singh	Bharatiya Janata Party	4,04,542	Bahadur Singh	Indian National Lok Dal	2,75,148	1,29,394
Haryana	9	Gurgaon	GEN	Rao Inderjit Singh	Bharatiya Janata Party	6,44,780	Zakir Hussain	Indian National Lok Dal	3,70,058	2,74,722
Haryana	10	Faridabad	GEN	Krishan Pal Gurjar	Bharatiya Janata Party	6,52,516	Avtar Singh Bhadana	Indian National Congress	1,85,643	4,66,873
Himachal Pradesh	1	Kangra	GEN	Shanta Kumar	Bharatiya Janata Party	4,56,163	Chander Kumar	Indian National Congress	2,86,091	1,70,072
Himachal Pradesh	2	Mandi	GEN	Ram Swaroop Sharma	Bharatiya Janata Party	3,62,824	Pratibha Singh	Indian National Congress	3,22,968	39,856
Himachal Pradesh	3	Hamirpur	GEN	Anurag Thakur	Bharatiya Janata Party	4,48,035	Rajinder Singh Rana	Indian National Congress	3,49,632	98,403
Himachal Pradesh	4	Shimla	(SC)	Virender Kashyap	Bharatiya Janata Party	3,85,973	Mohal Lal Brakta	Indian National Congress	3,01,786	84,187
Jammu and Kashmir	1	Baramulla	GEN	Muzaffar Hussain Baig	Jammu and Kashmir Peoples Democratic Party	1,75,277	Sharifuddin Shariq	Jammu & Kashmir National Conference	1,46,058	29,219
Jammu and Kashmir	2	Srinagar	GEN	Tariq Hameed Karra	Jammu and Kashmir Peoples Democratic Party	1,57,923	Farooq Abdullah	Jammu & Kashmir National Conference	1,15,643	42,280
Jammu and Kashmir	3	Anantnag	GEN	Mehbooba Mufti	Jammu and Kashmir Peoples Democratic Party	2,00,429	Mirza Mehboob Beg	Jammu & Kashmir National Conference	1,35,012	65,417
Jammu and Kashmir	4	Ladakh	(ST)	Thupstan Chhewang	Bharatiya Janata Party	31,111	Ghulam Raza	Independent	31,075	36
Jammu and Kashmir	5	Udhampur	GEN	Jitendra Singh	Bharatiya Janata Party	4,87,369	Ghulam Nabi Azad	Indian National Congress	4,26,393	60,976
Jammu and Kashmir	6	Jammu	GEN	Jugal Kishore Sharma	Bharatiya Janata Party	6,19,995	Madan Lal Sharma	Indian National Congress	3,62,715	2,57,280
Jharkhand	1	Rajmahal	(ST)	Vijay Hansdak	Jharkhand Mukti Morcha	3,79,507	Hemlal Murmu	Bharatiya Janata Party	3,38,170	41,337
Jharkhand	2	Dumka	(ST)	Shibu Soren	Jharkhand Mukti Morcha	3,35,815	Sunil Soren	Bharatiya Janata Party	2,96,785	39,030
Jharkhand	3	Godda	GEN	Nishikant Dubey	Bharatiya Janata Party	3,80,500	Furkan Ansari	Indian National Congress	3,19,818	60,682
Jharkhand	4	Chatra	GEN	Sunil Kumar Singh	Bharatiya Janata Party	2,95,862	Dhiraj Prasad Sahu	Indian National Congress	1,17,836	1,78,026
Jharkhand	5	Kodarma	GEN	Ravindra Kumar Ray	Bharatiya Janata Party	3,65,410	Raj Kumar Yadav	Communist Party of India (Marxist–Leninist) Liberation	2,66,756	98,654
Jharkhand	6	Giridih	GEN	Ravindra Kumar Pandey	Bharatiya Janata Party	3,91,913	Jagarnath Mahto	Jharkhand Mukti Morcha	3,51,600	40,313
Jharkhand	7	Dhanbad	GEN	Pashupati Nath Singh	Bharatiya Janata Party	5,43,491	Ajay Kumar Dubey	Indian National Congress	2,50,537	2,92,954
Jharkhand	8	Ranchi	GEN	Ram Tahal Choudhary	Bharatiya Janata Party	4,48,729	Subodh Kant Sahay	Indian National Congress	2,49,426	1,99,303
Jharkhand	9	Jamshedpur	GEN	Bidyut Baran Mahato	Bharatiya Janata Party	4,64,153	Ajoy Kumar	Jharkhand Vikas Morcha (Prajatantrik)	3,64,277	99,876
Jharkhand	10	Singhbhum	(SC)	Laxman Giluwa	Bharatiya Janata Party	3,03,131	Geeta Koda	Jai Bharat Samanta Party	2,15,607	87,524
Jharkhand	11	Khunti	(ST)	Karia Munda	Bharatiya Janata Party	2,69,185	Anosh Ekka	Jharkhand Party	1,76,937	92,248
Jharkhand	12	Lohardaga	(ST)	Sudarshan Bhagat	Bharatiya Janata Party	2,26,666	Rameshwar Oraon	Indian National Congress	2,20,177	6,489
Jharkhand	13	Palamu	(SC)	Vishnu Dayal Ram	Bharatiya Janata Party	4,76,513	Manoj Kumar	Rashtriya Janata Dal	2,12,571	2,63,942
Jharkhand	14	Hazaribagh	GEN	Jayant Sinha	Bharatiya Janata Party	4,06,931	Saurabh Narain Singh	Indian National Congress	2,47,803	1,59,128
Karnataka	1	Chikkodi	GEN	Prakash Hukkeri	Indian National Congress	4,74,373	Ramesh Katti	Bharatiya Janata Party	4,71,370	3,003
Karnataka	2	Belgaum	GEN	Suresh Angadi	Bharatiya Janata Party	5,54,417	Lakshmi Hebbalkar	Indian National Congress	4,78,557	75,860
Karnataka	3	Bagalkot	GEN	P. C. Gaddigoudar	Bharatiya Janata Party	571548	Ajay Kumar Sarnaik	Indian National Congress	454988	116560
Karnataka	4	Bijapur	(SC)	Ramesh Jigajinagi	Bharatiya Janata Party	471757	Prakash Rathod	Indian National Congress	401938	69819
Karnataka	5	Gulbarga	(SC)	Mallikarjun Kharge	Indian National Congress	507193	Revunaik Belamagi	Bharatiya Janata Party	432460	74733
Karnataka	6	Raichur	(ST)	B.V.Nayak	Indian National Congress	443659	Arakera Shivanagouda Nayak	Bharatiya Janata Party	442160	1499
Karnataka	7	Bidar	GEN	Bhagwanth Khuba	Bharatiya Janata Party	459290	N. Dharam Singh	Indian National Congress	367068	92222
Karnataka	8	Koppal	GEN	Karadi Sanganna	Bharatiya Janata Party	486383	Basavaraj Hitnal	Indian National Congress	453969	32414
Karnataka	9	Bellary	(ST)	B. Sreeramulu	Bharatiya Janata Party	534406	N.Y. Hanumantappa	Indian National Congress	449262	85144
Karnataka	10	Haveri	GEN	Udasi Shivakumar Channabasappa	Bharatiya Janata Party	566790	Saleem Ahmed	Indian National Congress	479219	87571
Karnataka	11	Dharwad	GEN	Pralhad Joshi	Bharatiya Janata Party	545395	Vinay Kulkarni	Indian National Congress	431738	113657
Karnataka	12	Uttara Kannada	GEN	Anantkumar Hegde	Bharatiya Janata Party	546939	Prashant R Deshpande	Indian National Congress	406239	140700
Karnataka	13	Davanagere	GEN	G M Siddeshwara	Bharatiya Janata Party	518894	S.S. Mallikarjun	Indian National Congress	501287	17607
Karnataka	14	Shimoga	GEN	B. S. Yeddyurappa	Bharatiya Janata Party	606216	Manjunath Bhandary	Indian National Congress	242911	363305
Karnataka	15	Udupi Chikmagalur	GEN	Shobha Karandlaje	Bharatiya Janata Party	581168	K Jayaprakash Hegde	Indian National Congress	399525	181643
Karnataka	16	Hassan	GEN	H.D. Devegowda	Janata Dal (Secular)	509841	Manju. A.	Indian National Congress	409379	100462
Karnataka	17	Dakshina Kannada	GEN	Nalin Kumar Kateel	Bharatiya Janata Party	642739	Janardhana Poojary	Indian National Congress	499030	143709
Karnataka	18	Chitradurga	(SC)	B.N.Chandrappa	Indian National Congress	467511	Janardhana Swamy	Bharatiya Janata Party	366220	101291
Karnataka	19	Tumkur	GEN	Muddahanumegowda.S.P.	Indian National Congress	429868	G.S.Basavaraj	Bharatiya Janata Party	355827	74041
Karnataka	20	Mandya	GEN	C.S.Puttaraju	Janata Dal (Secular)	524370	Ramya	Indian National Congress	518852	5518
Karnataka	21	Mysore	GEN	Prathap Simha	Bharatiya Janata Party	503908	Adagooru H Vishwanath	Indian National Congress	472300	31608
Karnataka	22	Chamarajanagar	(SC)	R. Dhruvanarayana	Indian National Congress	567782	A. R. Krishna Murthy	Bharatiya Janata Party	426600	141182
Karnataka	23	Bangalore Rural	GEN	D K Suresh	Indian National Congress	652723	Muniraju Gowda . P	Bharatiya Janata Party	421243	231480
Karnataka	24	Bangalore North	GEN	D.V Sadananda Gowda	Bharatiya Janata Party	718326	C.Narayana Swamy	Indian National Congress	488562	229764
Karnataka	25	Bangalore Central	GEN	P.C. Mohan	Bharatiya Janata Party	557130	Rizwan Arshad	Indian National Congress	419630	137500
Karnataka	26	Bangalore South	GEN	Ananth Kumar	Bharatiya Janata Party	633816	Nandan Nilekani	Indian National Congress	405241	228575
Karnataka	27	Chikkaballapur	GEN	M Veerappa Moily	Indian National Congress	424800	B N Bache Gowda	Bharatiya Janata Party	415280	9520
Karnataka	28	Kolar	GEN	K.H.Muniyappa	Indian National Congress	418926	Kolar Kesava	Janata Dal (Secular)	371076	47850
Kerala	1	Kasaragod	GEN	P Karunakaran	Communist Party of India (Marxist)	384964	Adv. T Siddique	Indian National Congress	378043	6921
Kerala	2	Kannur	GEN	P K Sreemathi Teacher	Communist Party of India (Marxist)	427622	K Sudhakaran	Indian National Congress	421056	6566
Kerala	3	Vatakara	GEN	Mullappally Ramachandran	Indian National Congress	416479	Adv.A.N.Shamseer	Communist Party of India (Marxist)	413173	3306
Kerala	4	Wayanad	GEN	M I Shanavas	Indian National Congress	377035	Sathyan Mokeri	Communist Party of India	356165	20870
Kerala	5	Kozhikode	GEN	M .K Raghavan	Indian National Congress	397615	A.Vijayaraghavan	Communist Party of India (Marxist)	380732	16883
Kerala	6	Malappuram	GEN	E. Ahamed	Indian Union Muslim League	437723	P.K.Sainaba	Communist Party of India (Marxist)	242984	194739
Kerala	7	Ponnani	GEN	E. T. Mohammed Basheer	Indian Union Muslim League	378503	V.Abdurahman	Independent	353093	25410
Kerala	8	Palakkad	GEN	M B Rajesh	Communist Party of India (Marxist)	412897	M. P. Veerendra Kumar	Socialist Janata (Democratic)	307597	105300
Kerala	9	Alathur	(SC)	P.K.Biju	Communist Party of India (Marxist)	411808	Sheeba K.A	Indian National Congress	374496	37312
Kerala	10	Thrissur	GEN	C. N. Jayadevan	Communist Party of India	389209	K. P. Dhanapalan	Indian National Congress	350982	38227
Kerala	11	Chalakudy	GEN	Innocent	Independent	358440	P C Chacko	Indian National Congress	344556	13884
Kerala	12	Ernakulam	GEN	Prof. K.V. Thomas	Indian National Congress	353841	Christy Fernandez	Independent	266794	87047
Kerala	13	Idukki	GEN	Adv.Joice George	Independent	382019	Adv.Dean Kuriakose	Indian National Congress	331477	50542
Kerala	14	Kottayam	GEN	Jose K. Mani	Kerala Congress (M)	424194	Adv.Mathew T. Thomas	Janata Dal (Secular)	303595	120599
Kerala	15	Alappuzha	GEN	K C Venugopal	Indian National Congress	462525	C B Chandrababu	Communist Party of India (Marxist)	443118	19407
Kerala	16	Mavelikkara	(SC)	Kodikunnil Suresh	Indian National Congress	402432	Chengara Surendran	Communist Party of India	369695	32737
Kerala	17	Pathanamthitta	GEN	Anto Antony	Indian National Congress	358842	Adv. Peelipose Thomas	Independent	302651	56191
Kerala	18	Kollam	GEN	N.K.Premachandran	Revolutionary Socialist Party	408528	M.A. Baby	Communist Party of India (Marxist)	370879	37649
Kerala	19	Attingal	GEN	Dr.A .Sampath	Communist Party of India (Marxist)	392478	Adv.Bindhu Krishna	Indian National Congress	323100	69378
Kerala	20	Thiruvananthapuram	GEN	Dr. Shashi Tharoor	Indian National Congress	297806	Sri. O Rajagopal	Bharatiya Janata Party	282336	15,470
Lakshadweep	1	Lakshadweep	(ST)	Mohammed Faizal P.P.	Nationalist Congress Party	21,665	Hamdullah Sayeed	Indian National Congress	20,130	1,535
Madhya Pradesh	1	Morena	GEN	Anoop Mishra	Bharatiya Janata Party	375567	Brindawan Singh Sikarwar	Bahujan Samaj Party	242586	132981
Madhya Pradesh	2	Bhind	(SC)	Dr. Bhagirath Prasad	Bharatiya Janata Party	404474	Imarti Devi	Indian National Congress	244513	159961
Madhya Pradesh	3	Gwalior	GEN	Narendra Singh Tomar	Bharatiya Janata Party	442796	Ashok Singh	Indian National Congress	413097	29699
Madhya Pradesh	4	Guna	GEN	Jyotiraditya M Scindia	Indian National Congress	517036	Jaibhansingh Pawaiya	Bharatiya Janata Party	396244	120792
Madhya Pradesh	5	Sagar	GEN	Laxmi Narayan Yadav	Bharatiya Janata Party	482580	Govind Singh Rajput	Indian National Congress	361843	120737
Madhya Pradesh	6	Tikamgarh	(SC)	Dr. Virendra Kumar	Bharatiya Janata Party	422979	Ahirwar Dr. Kamlesh Verma	Indian National Congress	214248	208731
Madhya Pradesh	7	Damoh	GEN	Prahalad Singh Patel	Bharatiya Janata Party	513079	Choudhary Mahendra Pratap Singh	Indian National Congress	299780	213299
Madhya Pradesh	8	Khajuraho	GEN	Nagendra Singh	Bharatiya Janata Party	474966	Raja Pateria	Indian National Congress	227476	247490
Madhya Pradesh	9	Satna	GEN	Ganesh Singh	Bharatiya Janata Party	375288	Ajay Singh Rahul Bhaiya	Indian National Congress	366600	8688
Madhya Pradesh	10	Rewa	GEN	Janardan Mishra	Bharatiya Janata Party	383320	Sunderlal Tiwari	Indian National Congress	214594	168726
Madhya Pradesh	11	Sidhi	GEN	Riti Pathak	Bharatiya Janata Party	475678	Indrajeet Kumar	Indian National Congress	367632	108046
Madhya Pradesh	12	Shahdol	(ST)	Dalpat Singh Paraste	Bharatiya Janata Party	525419	Rajesh Nandini Singh	Indian National Congress	284118	241301
Madhya Pradesh	13	Jabalpur	GEN	Rakesh Singh	Bharatiya Janata Party	564609	Vivek Krishna Tankha	Indian National Congress	355970	208639
Madhya Pradesh	14	Mandla	(ST)	Faggan Singh Kulaste	Bharatiya Janata Party	585720	Omkar Singh Markam	Indian National Congress	475251	110469
Madhya Pradesh	15	Balaghat	GEN	Bodhsingh Bhagat	Bharatiya Janata Party	480594	Hina Likhiram Kawre	Indian National Congress	384553	96041
Madhya Pradesh	16	Chhindwara	GEN	Kamal Nath	Indian National Congress	559755	Choudhary Chandrabhan Kuber Singh	Bharatiya Janata Party	443218	116537
Madhya Pradesh	17	Hoshangabad	GEN	Uday Pratap Singh	Bharatiya Janata Party	669128	Devendra Patel	Indian National Congress	279168	389960
Madhya Pradesh	18	Vidisha	GEN	Sushma Swaraj	Bharatiya Janata Party	714348	Lakshman Singh	Indian National Congress	303650	410698
Madhya Pradesh	19	Bhopal	GEN	Alok Sanjar	Bharatiya Janata Party	714178	P C Sharma	Indian National Congress	343482	370696
Madhya Pradesh	20	Rajgarh	GEN	Rodmal Nagar	Bharatiya Janata Party	596727	Amlabe Narayan Singh	Indian National Congress	367990	228737
Madhya Pradesh	21	Dewas	(SC)	Manohar Untwal	Bharatiya Janata Party	665646	Sajjan Singh Verma	Indian National Congress	405333	260313
Madhya Pradesh	22	Ujjain	(SC)	Chintamani Malviya	Bharatiya Janata Party	641101	Premchand Guddu	Indian National Congress	331438	309663
Madhya Pradesh	23	Mandsaur	GEN	Sudhir Gupta	Bharatiya Janata Party	698335	Meenakshi Natarajan	Indian National Congress	394686	303649
Madhya Pradesh	24	Ratlam	(ST)	Dileepsingh Bhuria	Bharatiya Janata Party	545970	Kantilal Bhuria	Indian National Congress	437523	108447
Madhya Pradesh	25	Dhar	(ST)	Savitri Thakur	Bharatiya Janata Party	558387	Umang Singhar	Indian National Congress	454059	104328
Madhya Pradesh	26	Indore	GEN	Sumitra Mahajan	Bharatiya Janata Party	854972	Satyanarayan Patel	Indian National Congress	388071	466901
Madhya Pradesh	27	Khargone	(ST)	Subhash Patel	Bharatiya Janata Party	649354	Ramesh Patel	Indian National Congress	391475	257879
Madhya Pradesh	28	Khandwa	GEN	Nandkumar Singh Chouhan (Nandu Bhaiya	Bharatiya Janata Party	717357	Arun Subhash Chandra Yadav	Indian National Congress	457643	259714
Madhya Pradesh	29	Betul	(ST)	Jyoti Dhurve	Bharatiya Janata Party	643651	Ajay Shah (Makrai)	Indian National Congress	315037	328614
Maharashtra	1	Nandurbar	(ST)	Dr.Gavit Heena Vaijaykumar	Bharatiya Janata Party	579486	Gavit Manikrao Hodlya	Indian National Congress	472581	106905
Maharashtra	2	Dhule	GEN	Dr. Bhamre Subhash Ramrao	Bharatiya Janata Party	529450	Amrishbhai Rasiklal Patel	Indian National Congress	398727	130723
Maharashtra	3	Jalgaon	GEN	A.T. Nana Patil	Bharatiya Janata Party	647773	Annasaheb Dr.Satish Bhaskarrao Patil	Nationalist Congress Party	264248	383525
Maharashtra	4	Raver	GEN	Khadase Raksha Nikhil	Bharatiya Janata Party	605452	Manishdada Jain	Nationalist Congress Party	287384	318068
Maharashtra	5	Buldhana	GEN	Jadhav Prataprao Ganpatrao	Shiv Sena	509145	Ingle Krushanarao Ganpatrao	Nationalist Congress Party	349566	159579
Maharashtra	6	Akola	GEN	Dhotre Sanjay Shamrao	Bharatiya Janata Party	456472	Patel Hidayat Ulla Barkat Ulla	Indian National Congress	253356	203116
Maharashtra	7	Amravati	(SC)	Adsul Anandrao Vithoba	Shiv Sena	467212	Navneet Ravi Rana	Nationalist Congress Party	329280	137932
Maharashtra	8	Wardha	GEN	Ramdas Chandrabhanji Tadas	Bharatiya Janata Party	537518	Meghe Sagar Dattatraya	Indian National Congress	321735	215783
Maharashtra	9	Ramtek	(SC)	Krupal Balaji Tumane	Shiv Sena	519892	Mukul Wasnik	Indian National Congress	344101	175791
Maharashtra	10	Nagpur	GEN	Gadkari Nitin Jairam	Bharatiya Janata Party	587767	Vilas Muttemwar	Indian National Congress	302939	284828
Maharashtra	11	Bhandara-Gondiya	GEN	Nanabhau Falgunrao Patole	Bharatiya Janata Party	606129	Praful Patel	Nationalist Congress Party	456875	149254
Maharashtra	12	Gadchiroli-Chimur	(ST)	Ashok Mahadeorao Nete	Bharatiya Janata Party	535982	Dr. Namdeo Dalluji Usendi	Indian National Congress	299112	236870
Maharashtra	13	Chandrapur	GEN	Ahir Hansraj Gangaram	Bharatiya Janata Party	508049	Deotale Sanjay Wamanrao	Indian National Congress	271780	236269
Maharashtra	14	Yavatmal-Washim	GEN	Gawali Bhavana Pundlikra	Shiv Sena	477905	Adv.Shivajirao Shivaramji Moghe	Indian National Congress	384089	93816
Maharashtra	15	Hingoli	GEN	Rajeev Satav	Indian National Congress	467397	Wankhede Subhash Bapurao	Shiv Sena	465765	1632
Maharashtra	16	Nanded	GEN	Ashok Chavan	Indian National Congress	493075	D. B. Patil	Bharatiya Janata Party	411620	81455
Maharashtra	17	Parbhani	GEN	Jadhav Sanjay (Bandu) Haribhau	Shiv Sena	578455	Bhambale Vijay Manikrao	Nationalist Congress Party	451300	127155
Maharashtra	18	Jalna	GEN	Danve Raosaheb	Bharatiya Janata Party	591428	Autade Vilas Keshavrao	Indian National Congress	384630	206798
Maharashtra	19	Aurangabad	GEN	Chandrakant Bhaurao Khaire	Shiv Sena	520902	Patil Nitin Suresh	Indian National Congress	358902	162000
Maharashtra	20	Dindori	(ST)	Chavan Harishchandra Deoram	Bharatiya Janata Party	542784	Dr. Bharati Pravin Pawar	Nationalist Congress Party	295165	247619
Maharashtra	21	Nashik	GEN	Godse Hemant Tukaram	Shiv Sena	494735	Chhagan Bhujbal	Nationalist Congress Party	307399	187336
Maharashtra	22	Palghar	(ST)	Adv. Chintaman Navasha Wanga	Bharatiya Janata Party	533201	Baliram Sukur Jadhav	Bahujan Vikas Aaghadi	293681	239520
Maharashtra	23	Bhiwandi	GEN	Kapil Moreshwar Patil	Bharatiya Janata Party	411070	Patil Vishwanath Ramchandra	Indian National Congress	301620	109450
Maharashtra	24	Kalyan	GEN	Dr.Shrikant Eknath Shinde	Shiv Sena	440892	Anand Prakash Paranjpe	Nationalist Congress Party	190143	250749
Maharashtra	25	Thane	GEN	Vichare Rajan Baburao	Shiv Sena	595364	Sanjeev Ganesh Naik	Nationalist Congress Party	314065	281299
Maharashtra	26	Mumbai-North	GEN	Gopal Chinayya Shetty	Bharatiya Janata Party	664004	Sanjay Brijkishorlal Nirupam	Indian National Congress	217422	446582
Maharashtra	27	Mumbai-North-West	GEN	Gajanan Chandrakant Kirtikar	Shiv Sena	464820	Kamat Gurudas Vasant	Indian National Congress	281792	183028
Maharashtra	28	Mumbai-North-East	GEN	Kirit Somaiya	Bharatiya Janata Party	525285	Sanjay Dina Patil	Nationalist Congress Party	208163	317122
Maharashtra	29	Mumbai-North-Central	GEN	Poonam Mahajan	Bharatiya Janata Party	478535	Dutt Priya Sunil	Indian National Congress	291764	186771
Maharashtra	30	Mumbai-South-Central	GEN	Rahul Ramesh Shewale	Shiv Sena	381275	Eknath M. Gaikwad	Indian National Congress	242933	138342
Maharashtra	31	Mumbai-South	GEN	Arvind Sawant	Shiv Sena	374780	Deora Milind Murli	Indian National Congress	246632	128148
Maharashtra	32	Raigad	GEN	Anant Geete	Shiv Sena	396178	Tatkare Sunil Dattatrey	Nationalist Congress Party	394068	2110
Maharashtra	33	Maval	GEN	Shrirang Barne	Shiv Sena	512226	Laxman Jagtap	Peasants and Workers Party of India	354829	157397
Maharashtra	34	Pune	GEN	Anil Shirole	Bharatiya Janata Party	569825	Dr.Vishwajeet Patangrao Kadam	Indian National Congress	254056	315769
Maharashtra	35	Baramati	GEN	Supriya Sule	Nationalist Congress Party	521562	Mahadev Jankar	Rashtriya Samaj Paksha	451843	69719
Maharashtra	36	Shirur	GEN	Adhalrao Shivaji Dattatrey	Shiv Sena	643415	Nikam Devdatta Jaywant	Nationalist Congress Party	341601	301814
Maharashtra	37	Ahmednagar	GEN	Gandhi Dilipkumar Mansukhlal	Bharatiya Janata Party	605185	Rajeev Appasaheb Rajale	Nationalist Congress Party	396063	209122
Maharashtra	38	Shirdi	(SC)	Sadashiv Lokhande	Shiv Sena	532936	Bhausaheb Rajaram Wakchaure	Indian National Congress	333014	199922
Maharashtra	39	Beed	GEN	Gopinath Munde	Bharatiya Janata Party	6,35,995	Suresh Dhas	Nationalist Congress Party	4,99,541	1,36,454
Maharashtra	40	Osmanabad	GEN	Gaikwad Ravindra Vishwanath	Shiv Sena	607699	Patil Padmasinha Bajirao	Nationalist Congress Party	373374	234325
Maharashtra	41	Latur	(SC)	Dr. Sunil Baliram Gaikwad	Bharatiya Janata Party	616509	Bansode Dattatray Gunderao	Indian National Congress	363114	253395
Maharashtra	42	Solapur	(SC)	Sharad Bansode	Bharatiya Janata Party	517879	Shinde Sushilkumar Sambhajirao	Indian National Congress	368205	149674
Maharashtra	43	Madha	GEN	Mohite Patil Vijaysinh Shankarrao	Nationalist Congress Party	489989	Sadabhau Khot	Swabhimani Paksha	464645	25344
Maharashtra	44	Sangli	GEN	Sanjaykaka Patil	Bharatiya Janata Party	611563	Patil Pratik Prakashbapu	Indian National Congress	372271	239292
Maharashtra	45	Satara	GEN	Udayanraje Bhosale	Nationalist Congress Party	522531	Purushottam Jadhav	Independent	155937	366594
Maharashtra	46	Ratnagiri-Sindhudurg	GEN	Vinayak Bhaurao Raut	Shiv Sena	493088	Nilesh Narayan Rane	Indian National Congress	343037	150051
Maharashtra	47	Kolhapur	GEN	Dhananjay Mahadik	Nationalist Congress Party	607665	Sanjay Sadashiv Mandalik	Shiv Sena	574406	33259
Maharashtra	48	Hatkanangle	GEN	Raju Shetty	Swabhimani Paksha	640428	Awade Kallappa Baburao	Indian National Congress	462618	177810
Manipur	1	Inner Manipur	GEN	Dr. Thokchom Meinya	Indian National Congress	292102	Moirangthem Nara	Communist Party of India	197428	94674
Manipur	2	Outer Manipur	(ST)	Thangso Baite	Indian National Congress	296770	Soso Lorho	Naga People's Front	281133	15637
Meghalaya	1	Shillong	(ST)	Vincent H. Pala	Indian National Congress	209340	Prechard B. M. Basaiawmoit	Independent	168961	40379
Meghalaya	2	Tura	(ST)	Purno Agitok Sangma	National People's Party	239301	Daryl William Ch Momil	Indian National Congress	199585	39716
Mizoram	1	Mizoram	(ST)	C. L. Ruala	Indian National Congress	210485	Robert Romawia Royte	Independent	204331	6154
Nagaland	1	Nagaland	(ST)	Neiphiu Rio	Naga People's Front	713372	K. V. Pusa	Indian National Congress	313147	400225
Odisha	1	Bargarh	GEN	Prabhas Kumar Singh	Biju Janata Dal	383230	Subash Chouhan	Bharatiya Janata Party	372052	11178
Odisha	2	Sundargarh	(ST)	Jual Oram	Bharatiya Janata Party	340508	Dilip Kumar Tirkey	Biju Janata Dal	321679	18829
Odisha	3	Sambalpur	GEN	Nagendra Kumar Pradhan	Biju Janata Dal	358618	Suresh Pujari	Bharatiya Janata Party	328042	30576
Odisha	4	Keonjhar	(ST)	Sakuntala Laguri	Biju Janata Dal	434471	Ananta Nayak	Bharatiya Janata Party	277154	157317
Odisha	5	Mayurbhanj	(ST)	Rama Chandra Hansdah	Biju Janata Dal	393779	Nepole Raghu Murmu	Bharatiya Janata Party	270913	122866
Odisha	6	Balasore	GEN	Rabindra Kumar Jena	Biju Janata Dal	433768	Pratap Chandra Sarangi	Bharatiya Janata Party	291943	141825
Odisha	7	Bhadrak	(SC)	Arjun Charan Sethi	Biju Janata Dal	502338	Sangram Keshari Jena	Indian National Congress	322979	179359
Odisha	8	Jajpur	(SC)	Rita Tarai	Biju Janata Dal	541349	Asok Das	Indian National Congress	221078	320271
Odisha	9	Dhenkanal	GEN	Tathagata Satpathy	Biju Janata Dal	453277	Rudra Narayan Pany	Bharatiya Janata Party	315937	137340
Odisha	10	Bolangir	GEN	Kalikesh Narayan Singh Deo	Biju Janata Dal	453519	Sangeeta Kumari Singh Deo	Bharatiya Janata Party	349220	104299
Odisha	11	Kalahandi	GEN	Arka Keshari Deo	Biju Janata Dal	370871	Pradipta Kumar Naik	Bharatiya Janata Party	314524	56347
Odisha	12	Nabarangpur	(ST)	Balabhadra Majhi	Biju Janata Dal	373887	Pradeep Kumar Majhi	Indian National Congress	371845	2042
Odisha	13	Kandhamal	GEN	Hemendra Chandra Singh	Biju Janata Dal	4,21,458	Harihara Karana	Indian National Congress	2,40,441	1,81,017
Odisha	14	Cuttack	GEN	Bhartruhari Mahatab	Biju Janata Dal	526085	Aparajita Mohanty	Indian National Congress	219323	306762
Odisha	15	Kendrapara	GEN	Baijayant Panda	Biju Janata Dal	601574	Dharanidhar Nayak	Indian National Congress	392466	209108
Odisha	16	Jagatsinghpur	(SC)	Kulamani Samal	Biju Janata Dal	624492	Bibhu Prasad Tarai	Indian National Congress	348098	276394
Odisha	17	Puri	GEN	Pinaki Misra	Biju Janata Dal	523161	Sucharita Mohanty	Indian National Congress	259800	263361
Odisha	18	Bhubaneswar	GEN	Prasanna Kumar Patasani	Biju Janata Dal	439252	Prithiviraj Harichandan	Bharatiya Janata Party	249775	189477
Odisha	19	Aska	GEN	Ladu Kishore Swain	Biju Janata Dal	541473	Srilokanath Ratha	Indian National Congress	229476	311997
Odisha	20	Berhampur	GEN	Sidhant Mohapatra	Biju Janata Dal	398107	Chandra Sekhar Sahu	Indian National Congress	270387	127720
Odisha	21	Koraput	(ST)	Jhina Hikaka	Biju Janata Dal	395109	Giridhar Gamang	Indian National Congress	375781	19328
Puducherry	1	Puducherry	GEN	R. Radhakrishnan	All India N.R. Congress	2,55,826	V. Narayanasamy	Indian National Congress	1,94,972	60,854
Punjab	1	Gurdaspur	GEN	Vinod Khanna	Bharatiya Janata Party	482255	Partap Singh Bajwa	Indian National Congress	346190	136065
Punjab	2	Amritsar	GEN	Captain Amarinder Singh	Indian National Congress	482876	Arun Jaitley	Bharatiya Janata Party	380106	102770
Punjab	3	Khadoor Sahib	GEN	Ranjit Singh Brahmpura	Shiromani Akali Dal	467332	Harminder Singh Gill	Indian National Congress	366763	100569
Punjab	4	Jalandhar	(SC)	Santokh Singh Chaudhary	Indian National Congress	380479	Pawan Kumar Tinu	Shiromani Akali Dal	309498	70981
Punjab	5	Hoshiarpur	(SC)	Vijay Sampla	Bharatiya Janata Party	346643	Mohinder Singh Kaypee	Indian National Congress	333061	13582
Punjab	6	Anandpur Sahib	GEN	Prem Singh Chandumajra	Shiromani Akali Dal	347394	Ambika Soni	Indian National Congress	323697	23697
Punjab	7	Ludhiana	GEN	Ravneet Singh Bittu	Indian National Congress	300459	Harvinder Singh Phoolka	Aam Aadmi Party	280750	19709
Punjab	8	Fatehgarh Sahib	(SC)	Harinder Singh Khalsa	Aam Aadmi Party	367293	Sadhu Singh	Indian National Congress	313149	54144
Punjab	9	Faridkot	(SC)	Prof. Sadhu Singh	Aam Aadmi Party	450751	Paramjit Kaur Gulshan	Shiromani Akali Dal	278235	172516
Punjab	10	Ferozpur	GEN	Sher Singh Ghubaya	Shiromani Akali Dal	487932	Sunil Jakhar	Indian National Congress	456512	31420
Punjab	11	Bathinda	GEN	Harsimrat Kaur Badal	Shiromani Akali Dal	514727	Manpreet Singh Badal	Indian National Congress	495332	19395
Punjab	12	Sangrur	GEN	Bhagwant Mann	Aam Aadmi Party	533237	Sukhdev Singh Dhindsa	Shiromani Akali Dal	321516	211721
Punjab	13	Patiala	GEN	Dharam Vira Gandhi	Aam Aadmi Party	365671	Preneet Kaur	Indian National Congress	344729	20942
Rajasthan	1	Ganganagar	(SC)	Nihalchand	Bharatiya Janata Party	658130	Master Bhanwarlal Meghwal	Indian National Congress	366389	291741
Rajasthan	2	Bikaner	(SC)	Arjun Ram Meghwal	Bharatiya Janata Party	584932	Er. Shankar Pannu	Indian National Congress	276853	308079
Rajasthan	3	Churu	GEN	Rahul Kaswan	Bharatiya Janata Party	595756	Abhinesh Maharshi	Bahujan Samaj Party	301017	294739
Rajasthan	4	Jhunjhunu	GEN	Santosh Ahlawat	Bharatiya Janata Party	488182	Raj Bala Ola	Indian National Congress	254347	233835
Rajasthan	5	Sikar	GEN	Sumedhanand Saraswati	Bharatiya Janata Party	499428	Pratap Singh Jat	Indian National Congress	260232	239196
Rajasthan	6	Jaipur Rural	GEN	Rajyavardhan Singh Rathore	Bharatiya Janata Party	632930	C.P. Joshi	Indian National Congress	300034	332896
Rajasthan	7	Jaipur	GEN	Ramcharan Bohara	Bharatiya Janata Party	863358	Dr. Mahesh Joshi	Indian National Congress	324013	539345
Rajasthan	8	Alwar	GEN	Chand Nath	Bharatiya Janata Party	642278	Bhanwar Jitendra Singh	Indian National Congress	358383	283895
Rajasthan	9	Bharatpur	(SC)	Bahadur Singh	Bharatiya Janata Party	579825	Dr.Suresh Jatav	Indian National Congress	334357	245468
Rajasthan	10	Karauli-Dholpur	(SC)	Manoj Rajoria	Bharatiya Janata Party	402407	Lakkhiram	Indian National Congress	375191	27216
Rajasthan	11	Dausa	(ST)	Harish Chandra Meena	Bharatiya Janata Party	315059	Kirodi Lal	National People's Party	269655	45404
Rajasthan	12	Tonk-Sawai Madhopur	GEN	Sukhbir Singh Jaunapuria	Bharatiya Janata Party	548179	Mohammed Azharuddin	Indian National Congress	412868	135311
Rajasthan	13	Ajmer	GEN	Sanwar Lal Jat	Bharatiya Janata Party	637874	Sachin Pilot	Indian National Congress	465891	171983
Rajasthan	14	Nagaur	GEN	C R Choudhary	Bharatiya Janata Party	414791	Jyoti Mirdha	Indian National Congress	339573	75218
Rajasthan	15	Pali	GEN	P P Choudhary	Bharatiya Janata Party	711772	Munni Devi Godara	Indian National Congress	312733	399039
Rajasthan	16	Jodhpur	GEN	Gajendrasingh Shekhawat	Bharatiya Janata Party	713515	Chandresh Kumari	Indian National Congress	303464	410051
Rajasthan	17	Barmer	GEN	Col. Sona Ram	Bharatiya Janata Party	488747	Jaswant Singh	Independent	401286	87461
Rajasthan	18	Jalore	(SC)	Devji Patel	Bharatiya Janata Party	580508	Anjana Udai Lal	Indian National Congress	199363	381145
Rajasthan	19	Udaipur	(ST)	Arjunlal Meena	Bharatiya Janata Party	660373	Raghuvir Singh	Indian National Congress	423611	236762
Rajasthan	20	Banswara	(ST)	Manshankar Ninama	Bharatiya Janata Party	577433	Resham Malviya	Indian National Congress	485517	91916
Rajasthan	21	Chittorgarh	GEN	Chandra Prakash Joshi	Bharatiya Janata Party	703236	Girija Vyas	Indian National Congress	386379	316857
Rajasthan	22	Rajsamand	GEN	Hariom Singh Rathore	Bharatiya Janata Party	644794	Gopal Singh Shekhawat	Indian National Congress	249089	395705
Rajasthan	23	Bhilwara	GEN	Subhash Baheria	Bharatiya Janata Party	630317	Ashok Chandna	Indian National Congress	384053	246264
Rajasthan	24	Kota	GEN	Om Birla	Bharatiya Janata Party	644822	Ijyaraj Singh	Indian National Congress	444040	200782
Rajasthan	25	Jhalawar-Baran	GEN	Dushyant Singh	Bharatiya Janata Party	676102	Pramod Bhaya	Indian National Congress	394556	281546
Sikkim	1	Sikkim	GEN	Prem Das Rai	Sikkim Democratic Front	163698	Tek Nath Dhakal	Sikkim Krantikari Morcha	121956	41742
Tamil Nadu	1	Tiruvallur	(SC)	Venugopal.P.(Dr)	All India Anna Dravida Munnetra Kazhagam	628499	Ravikumar.D	Viduthalai Chiruthaigal Katchi	305069	323430
Tamil Nadu	2	Chennai North	GEN	Venkatesh Babu .T.G	All India Anna Dravida Munnetra Kazhagam	406704	Girirajan .R	Dravida Munnetra Kazhagam	307000	99704
Tamil Nadu	3	Chennai South	GEN	Dr. J. Jayavardhan	All India Anna Dravida Munnetra Kazhagam	438404	T.K.S.Elangovan	Dravida Munnetra Kazhagam	301779	136625
Tamil Nadu	4	Chennai Central	GEN	S.R. Vijayakumar	All India Anna Dravida Munnetra Kazhagam	333296	Dayanidhi Maran	Dravida Munnetra Kazhagam	287455	45841
Tamil Nadu	5	Sriperumbudur	GEN	Ramachandran, K.N.	All India Anna Dravida Munnetra Kazhagam	545820	Jagathrakshakan	Dravida Munnetra Kazhagam	443174	102646
Tamil Nadu	6	Kancheepuram	(SC)	Maragatham K	All India Anna Dravida Munnetra Kazhagam	499395	Selvam G	Dravida Munnetra Kazhagam	352529	146866
Tamil Nadu	7	Arakkonam	GEN	Hari, G.	All India Anna Dravida Munnetra Kazhagam	493534	N.R Elango	Dravida Munnetra Kazhagam	252768	240766
Tamil Nadu	8	Vellore	GEN	Senguttuvan, B.	All India Anna Dravida Munnetra Kazhagam	383719	Shanmugam, A.C.	Bharatiya Janata Party	324326	59393
Tamil Nadu	9	Krishnagiri	GEN	Ashok Kumar.K	All India Anna Dravida Munnetra Kazhagam	480491	Chinna Pillappa.P	Dravida Munnetra Kazhagam	273900	206591
Tamil Nadu	10	Dharmapuri	GEN	Anbumani Ramadoss	Pattali Makkal Katchi	468194	Mohan.P.S	All India Anna Dravida Munnetra Kazhagam	391048	77146
Tamil Nadu	11	Tiruvannamalai	GEN	Vanaroja R	All India Anna Dravida Munnetra Kazhagam	500751	Annadurai C N	Dravida Munnetra Kazhagam	332145	168606
Tamil Nadu	12	Arani	GEN	V.Elumalai	All India Anna Dravida Munnetra Kazhagam	502721	R.Sivanandam	Dravida Munnetra Kazhagam	258877	243844
Tamil Nadu	13	Viluppuram	(SC)	Rajendran S	All India Anna Dravida Munnetra Kazhagam	482704	Muthaiyan K	Dravida Munnetra Kazhagam	289337	193367
Tamil Nadu	14	Kallakurichi	GEN	Kamaraj. K	All India Anna Dravida Munnetra Kazhagam	533383	Manimaran. R	Dravida Munnetra Kazhagam	309876	223507
Tamil Nadu	15	Salem	GEN	Pannerselvam.V	All India Anna Dravida Munnetra Kazhagam	556546	Umarani. S	Dravida Munnetra Kazhagam	288936	267610
Tamil Nadu	16	Namakkal	GEN	Sundaram P.R	All India Anna Dravida Munnetra Kazhagam	563272	Gandhiselvan.S	Dravida Munnetra Kazhagam	268898	294374
Tamil Nadu	17	Erode	GEN	Selvakumara Chinnayan S	All India Anna Dravida Munnetra Kazhagam	466995	A. Ganeshamurthi	Marumalarchi Dravida Munnetra Kazhagam	255432	211563
Tamil Nadu	18	Tiruppur	GEN	V.Sathyabama	All India Anna Dravida Munnetra Kazhagam	442778	N.Dineshkumar	Desiya Murpokku Dravida Kazhagam	263463	179315
Tamil Nadu	19	Nilgiris	(SC)	Gopalakrishnan, C.	All India Anna Dravida Munnetra Kazhagam	463700	Raja, A.	Dravida Munnetra Kazhagam	358760	104940
Tamil Nadu	20	Coimbatore	GEN	Nagarajan, P.	All India Anna Dravida Munnetra Kazhagam	431717	Radhakrishnan, C.P	Bharatiya Janata Party	389701	42016
Tamil Nadu	21	Pollachi	GEN	Mahendran.C	All India Anna Dravida Munnetra Kazhagam	417092	Eswaran.E.R.	Bharatiya Janata Party	276118	140974
Tamil Nadu	22	Dindigul	GEN	Udhaya Kumar .M	All India Anna Dravida Munnetra Kazhagam	510462	Gandhirajan S	Dravida Munnetra Kazhagam	382617	127845
Tamil Nadu	23	Karur	GEN	Thambidurai, M.	All India Anna Dravida Munnetra Kazhagam	540722	Chinnasamy, M	Dravida Munnetra Kazhagam	345475	195247
Tamil Nadu	24	Tiruchirappalli	GEN	Kumar.P	All India Anna Dravida Munnetra Kazhagam	458478	Anbhalagan.Mu	Dravida Munnetra Kazhagam	308002	150476
Tamil Nadu	25	Perambalur	GEN	Marutharajaa, R.P.	All India Anna Dravida Munnetra Kazhagam	462693	Seemanur Prabu, S	Dravida Munnetra Kazhagam	249645	213048
Tamil Nadu	26	Cuddalore	GEN	Arunmozhithevan.A	All India Anna Dravida Munnetra Kazhagam	481429	Nandagopalakrishnan.K	Dravida Munnetra Kazhagam	278304	203125
Tamil Nadu	27	Chidambaram	(SC)	Chandrakasi, M	All India Anna Dravida Munnetra Kazhagam	429536	Thirumaavalavan, Thol	Viduthalai Chiruthaigal Katchi	301041	128495
Tamil Nadu	28	Mayiladuthurai	GEN	Bharathi Mohan R.K	All India Anna Dravida Munnetra Kazhagam	513729	Hyder Ali.S	Manithaneya Makkal Katchi	236679	277050
Tamil Nadu	29	Nagapattinam	(SC)	Gopal. Dr. K	All India Anna Dravida Munnetra Kazhagam	434174	Vijayan. A.K.S	Dravida Munnetra Kazhagam	328095	106079
Tamil Nadu	30	Thanjavur	GEN	Parasuraman.K	All India Anna Dravida Munnetra Kazhagam	510307	Baalu.T.R	Dravida Munnetra Kazhagam	366188	144119
Tamil Nadu	31	Sivaganga	GEN	Senthilnathan Pr	All India Anna Dravida Munnetra Kazhagam	475993	Dhurai Raaj Subha	Dravida Munnetra Kazhagam	246608	229385
Tamil Nadu	32	Madurai	GEN	R.Gopalakrishnan	All India Anna Dravida Munnetra Kazhagam	454167	V Velusamy	Dravida Munnetra Kazhagam	256731	197436
Tamil Nadu	33	Theni	GEN	Parthipan, R.	All India Anna Dravida Munnetra Kazhagam	571254	Pon. Muthuramalingam	Dravida Munnetra Kazhagam	256722	314532
Tamil Nadu	34	Virudhunagar	GEN	Radhakrishnan T	All India Anna Dravida Munnetra Kazhagam	406694	Vaiko	Marumalarchi Dravida Munnetra Kazhagam	261143	145551
Tamil Nadu	35	Ramanathapuram	GEN	Anwhar Raajhaa.A	All India Anna Dravida Munnetra Kazhagam	405945	Mohamed Jaleel .S	Dravida Munnetra Kazhagam	286621	119324
Tamil Nadu	36	Thoothukkudi	GEN	Jeyasingh Thiyagaraj Natterjee.J	All India Anna Dravida Munnetra Kazhagam	366052	Jegan. P	Dravida Munnetra Kazhagam	242050	124002
Tamil Nadu	37	Tenkasi	(SC)	Vasanthi.M	All India Anna Dravida Munnetra Kazhagam	424586	Dr.Krishnasamy.K.	Puthiya Tamilagam	262812	161774
Tamil Nadu	38	Tirunelveli	GEN	Prabakaran.K.R.P	All India Anna Dravida Munnetra Kazhagam	398139	Devadasa Sundaram	Dravida Munnetra Kazhagam	272040	126099
Tamil Nadu	39	Kanniyakumari	GEN	Radhakrishnan P.	Bharatiya Janata Party	372906	Vasantha Kumar H.	Indian National Congress	244244	128662
Tripura	1	Tripura West	GEN	Sankar Prasad Datta	Communist Party of India (Marxist)	671665	Arunoday Saha	Indian National Congress	168179	503486
Tripura	2	Tripura East	(ST)	Jitendera Choudhury	Communist Party of India (Marxist)	623771	Sachitra Debbarma	Indian National Congress	139413	484358
Uttar Pradesh	1	Saharanpur	GEN	Raghav Lakhanpal	Bharatiya Janata Party	472999	Imran Masood	Indian National Congress	407909	65090
Uttar Pradesh	2	Kairana	GEN	Hukum Singh	Bharatiya Janata Party	565909	Nahid Hasan	Samajwadi Party	329081	236828
Uttar Pradesh	3	Muzaffarnagar	GEN	Sanjeev Kumar Balyan	Bharatiya Janata Party	653391	Kadir Rana	Bahujan Samaj Party	252241	401150
Uttar Pradesh	4	Bijnor	GEN	Kunwar Bhartendra	Bharatiya Janata Party	486913	Shahnawaz Rana	Samajwadi Party	281139	205774
Uttar Pradesh	5	Nagina	(SC)	Yashwant Singh	Bharatiya Janata Party	367825	Yashvir Singh	Samajwadi Party	275435	92390
Uttar Pradesh	6	Moradabad	GEN	Kunwer Sarvesh Kumar	Bharatiya Janata Party	485224	Dr S T Hasan	Samajwadi Party	397720	87504
Uttar Pradesh	7	Rampur	GEN	Dr. Nepal Singh	Bharatiya Janata Party	358616	Naseer Ahmad Khan	Samajwadi Party	335181	23435
Uttar Pradesh	8	Sambhal	GEN	Satyapal Singh	Bharatiya Janata Party	360242	Dr Shafiq Ur Rahman Barq	Samajwadi Party	355068	5174
Uttar Pradesh	9	Amroha	GEN	Kanwar Singh Tanwar	Bharatiya Janata Party	528880	Humera Akhtar	Samajwadi Party	370666	158214
Uttar Pradesh	10	Meerut	GEN	Rajendra Agarwal	Bharatiya Janata Party	532981	Mohd.Shahid Akhlak	Bahujan Samaj Party	300655	232326
Uttar Pradesh	11	Baghpat	GEN	Dr. Satya Pal Singh	Bharatiya Janata Party	423475	Ghulam Mohammed	Samajwadi Party	213609	209866
Uttar Pradesh	12	Ghaziabad	GEN	Vijay Kumar Singh	Bharatiya Janata Party	758482	Raj Babbar	Indian National Congress	191222	567260
Uttar Pradesh	13	Gautam Buddha Nagar	GEN	Dr.Mahesh Sharma	Bharatiya Janata Party	599702	Narendra Bhati	Samajwadi Party	319490	280212
Uttar Pradesh	14	Bulandshahr	(SC)	Bhola Singh	Bharatiya Janata Party	604449	Pradeep Kumar Jatav	Bahujan Samaj Party	182476	421973
Uttar Pradesh	15	Aligarh	GEN	Satish Kumar	Bharatiya Janata Party	514622	Dr. Arvind Kumar Singh	Bahujan Samaj Party	227886	286736
Uttar Pradesh	16	Hathras	(SC)	Rajesh Kumar Diwaker	Bharatiya Janata Party	544277	Manoj Kumar Soni	Bahujan Samaj Party	217891	326386
Uttar Pradesh	17	Mathura	GEN	Hema Malini Dharmendra	Bharatiya Janata Party	574633	Jayant Chaudhary	Rashtriya Lok Dal	243890	330743
Uttar Pradesh	18	Agra	(SC)	Dr. Ram Shankar Katheria	Bharatiya Janata Party	583716	Narayan Singh Suman	Bahujan Samaj Party	283453	300263
Uttar Pradesh	19	Fatehpur Sikri	GEN	Babulal	Bharatiya Janata Party	426589	Seema Upadhyay	Bahujan Samaj Party	253483	173106
Uttar Pradesh	20	Firozabad	GEN	Akshay Yadav	Samajwadi Party	534583	Prof. S.P. Singh Baghel	Bharatiya Janata Party	420524	114059
Uttar Pradesh	21	Mainpuri	GEN	Mulayam Singh Yadav	Samajwadi Party	5,95,918	Shatrughan Singh Chauhan	Bharatiya Janata Party	2,31,252	3,64,666
Uttar Pradesh	22	Etah	GEN	Rajveer Singh	Bharatiya Janata Party	474978	Ku. Devendra Singh Yadav	Samajwadi Party	273977	201001
Uttar Pradesh	23	Badaun	GEN	Dharmendra Yadav	Samajwadi Party	498378	Vagish Pathak	Bharatiya Janata Party	332031	166347
Uttar Pradesh	24	Aonla	GEN	Dharmendra Kumar	Bharatiya Janata Party	409907	Kunwar Sarvraj Singh	Samajwadi Party	271478	138429
Uttar Pradesh	25	Bareilly	GEN	Santosh Kumar Gangwar	Bharatiya Janata Party	518258	Ayesha Islam	Samajwadi Party	277573	240685
Uttar Pradesh	26	Pilibhit	GEN	Maneka Sanjay Gandhi	Bharatiya Janata Party	546934	Budhsen Verma	Samajwadi Party	239882	307052
Uttar Pradesh	27	Shahjahanpur	(SC)	Krishna Raj	Bharatiya Janata Party	525132	Umed Singh Kashyap	Bahujan Samaj Party	289603	235529
Uttar Pradesh	28	Kheri	GEN	Ajay Kumar	Bharatiya Janata Party	398578	Arvind Giri	Bahujan Samaj Party	288304	110274
Uttar Pradesh	29	Dhaurahra	GEN	Rekha	Bharatiya Janata Party	360357	Daud Ahmad	Bahujan Samaj Party	234682	125675
Uttar Pradesh	30	Sitapur	GEN	Rajesh Verma	Bharatiya Janata Party	417546	Kaiser Jahan	Bahujan Samaj Party	366519	51027
Uttar Pradesh	31	Hardoi	(SC)	Anshul Verma	Bharatiya Janata Party	360501	Shive Prasad Verma	Bahujan Samaj Party	279158	81343
Uttar Pradesh	32	Misrikh	(SC)	Anju Bala	Bharatiya Janata Party	412575	Ashok Kumar Rawat	Bahujan Samaj Party	325212	87363
Uttar Pradesh	33	Unnao	GEN	Swami Sachchidanand Hari Sakshi	Bharatiya Janata Party	518834	Arun Shankar Shukla	Samajwadi Party	208661	310173
Uttar Pradesh	34	Mohanlalganj	(SC)	Kaushal Kishore	Bharatiya Janata Party	455274	R.K Chaudhary	Bahujan Samaj Party	309858	145416
Uttar Pradesh	35	Lucknow	GEN	Raj Nath Singh	Bharatiya Janata Party	561106	Prof. Rita Bahuguna Joshi	Indian National Congress	288357	272749
Uttar Pradesh	36	Rae Bareli	GEN	Sonia Gandhi	Indian National Congress	526434	Ajay Agrawal	Bharatiya Janata Party	173721	352713
Uttar Pradesh	37	Amethi	GEN	Rahul Gandhi	Indian National Congress	408651	Smriti Irani	Bharatiya Janata Party	300748	107903
Uttar Pradesh	38	Sultanpur	GEN	Varun Gandhi	Bharatiya Janata Party	410348	Pawan Pandey	Bahujan Samaj Party	231446	178902
Uttar Pradesh	39	Pratapgarh	GEN	Kuwar Harivansh Singh	Apna Dal	375789	Asif Nizamuddin Siddique	Bahujan Samaj Party	207567	168222
Uttar Pradesh	40	Farrukhabad	GEN	Mukesh Rajput	Bharatiya Janata Party	406195	Rameshwar Singh Yadav	Samajwadi Party	255693	150502
Uttar Pradesh	41	Etawah	(SC)	Ashok Kumar Doharey	Bharatiya Janata Party	439646	Premdas Kateriya	Samajwadi Party	266700	172946
Uttar Pradesh	42	Kannauj	GEN	Dimple Yadav	Samajwadi Party	489164	Subrat Pathak	Bharatiya Janata Party	469257	19907
Uttar Pradesh	43	Kanpur	GEN	Dr.Murli Manohar Joshi	Bharatiya Janata Party	474712	Sriprakash Jaiswal	Indian National Congress	251766	222946
Uttar Pradesh	44	Akbarpur	GEN	Devendra Singh	Bharatiya Janata Party	481584	Anil Shukla Warsi	Bahujan Samaj Party	202587	278997
Uttar Pradesh	45	Jalaun	(SC)	Bhanu Pratap Singh Verma	Bharatiya Janata Party	548631	Brijlal Khabri	Bahujan Samaj Party	261429	287202
Uttar Pradesh	46	Jhansi	GEN	Uma Bharti	Bharatiya Janata Party	575889	Chandrapal Singh Yadav	Samajwadi Party	385422	190467
Uttar Pradesh	47	Hamirpur	GEN	Kunwar Pushpendra Singh Chandel	Bharatiya Janata Party	453884	Bishambhar Prasad Nishad	Samajwadi Party	187096	266788
Uttar Pradesh	48	Banda	GEN	Bhairon Prasad Mishra	Bharatiya Janata Party	342066	R. K. Singh Patel	Bahujan Samaj Party	226278	115788
Uttar Pradesh	49	Fatehpur	GEN	Sadhavi Niranjan Jyoti	Bharatiya Janata Party	485994	Afzal Siddiqui	Bahujan Samaj Party	298788	187206
Uttar Pradesh	50	Kaushambi	(SC)	Vinod Kumar Sonkar	Bharatiya Janata Party	331593	Shailendra Kumar	Samajwadi Party	288746	42847
Uttar Pradesh	51	Phulpur	GEN	Keshav Prasad Maurya	Bharatiya Janata Party	503564	Dharam Raj Singh Patel	Samajwadi Party	195256	308308
Uttar Pradesh	52	Allahabad	GEN	Shyama Charan Gupta	Bharatiya Janata Party	313772	Kunwar Rewati Raman Singh	Samajwadi Party	251763	62009
Uttar Pradesh	53	Barabanki	(SC)	Priyanka Singh Rawat	Bharatiya Janata Party	454214	P. L. Punia	Indian National Congress	242336	211878
Uttar Pradesh	54	Faizabad	GEN	Lallu Singh	Bharatiya Janata Party	491761	Mitrasen Yadav	Samajwadi Party	208986	282775
Uttar Pradesh	55	Ambedkar Nagar	GEN	Hari Om Pandey	Bharatiya Janata Party	432104	Rakesh Pandey	Bahujan Samaj Party	292675	139429
Uttar Pradesh	56	Bahraich	(SC)	Sadhvi Savitri Bai Foole	Bharatiya Janata Party	432392	Shabbir Ahmad	Samajwadi Party	336747	95645
Uttar Pradesh	57	Kaiserganj	GEN	Brij Bhusan Sharan Singh	Bharatiya Janata Party	381500	Vinod Kumar Alias Pandit Singh	Samajwadi Party	303282	78218
Uttar Pradesh	58	Shravasti	GEN	Daddan Mishra	Bharatiya Janata Party	345964	Atiq Ahmad	Samajwadi Party	260051	85913
Uttar Pradesh	59	Gonda	GEN	Kirti Vardhan Singh	Bharatiya Janata Party	359643	Nandita Shukla	Samajwadi Party	199227	160416
Uttar Pradesh	60	Domariyaganj	GEN	Jagdambika Pal	Bharatiya Janata Party	298845	Muhammad Muqeem	Bahujan Samaj Party	195257	103588
Uttar Pradesh	61	Basti	GEN	Harish Chandra Alias Harish Dwivedi	Bharatiya Janata Party	357680	Brij Kishor Singh (Dimpal)	Samajwadi Party	324118	33562
Uttar Pradesh	62	Sant Kabir Nagar	GEN	Sharad Tripathi	Bharatiya Janata Party	348892	Bhism Shankar Alias Kushal Tiwari	Bahujan Samaj Party	250914	97978
Uttar Pradesh	63	Maharajganj	GEN	Pankaj	Bharatiya Janata Party	471542	Kashi Nath Shukla	Bahujan Samaj Party	231084	240458
Uttar Pradesh	64	Gorakhpur	GEN	Yogi Adityanath	Bharatiya Janata Party	539127	Rajmati Nishad	Samajwadi Party	226344	312783
Uttar Pradesh	65	Kushi Nagar	GEN	Rajesh Pandey Urf Guddu	Bharatiya Janata Party	370051	Ratanjit Pratap Narain Singh	Indian National Congress	284511	85540
Uttar Pradesh	66	Deoria	GEN	Kalraj Mishra	Bharatiya Janata Party	496500	Niyaj Ahmad	Bahujan Samaj Party	231114	265386
Uttar Pradesh	67	Bansgaon	(SC)	Kamlesh Paswan	Bharatiya Janata Party	417959	Sadal Prasad	Bahujan Samaj Party	228443	189516
Uttar Pradesh	68	Lalganj	(SC)	Neelam Sonkar	Bharatiya Janata Party	324016	Bechai Saroj	Samajwadi Party	260930	63086
Uttar Pradesh	69	Azamgarh	GEN	Mulayam Singh Yadav	Samajwadi Party	340306	Ramakant Yadav	Bharatiya Janata Party	277102	63204
Uttar Pradesh	70	Ghosi	GEN	Harinarayan Rajbhar	Bharatiya Janata Party	379797	Dara Singh Chauhan	Bahujan Samaj Party	233782	146015
Uttar Pradesh	71	Salempur	GEN	Ravindra Kushawaha	Bharatiya Janata Party	392213	Ravi Shanker Singh	Bahujan Samaj Party	159871	232342
Uttar Pradesh	72	Ballia	GEN	Bharat Singh	Bharatiya Janata Party	359758	Neeraj Shekhar	Samajwadi Party	220324	139434
Uttar Pradesh	73	Jaunpur	GEN	Krishna Pratap	Bharatiya Janata Party	367149	Subhash Pandey	Bahujan Samaj Party	220839	146310
Uttar Pradesh	74	Machhlishahr	(SC)	Ram Charitra Nishad	Bharatiya Janata Party	438210	B. P. Saroj	Bahujan Samaj Party	266055	172155
Uttar Pradesh	75	Ghazipur	GEN	Manoj Sinha	Bharatiya Janata Party	306929	Shivkanya Kushwaha	Samajwadi Party	274477	32452
Uttar Pradesh	76	Chandauli	GEN	Mahendra Nath Pandey	Bharatiya Janata Party	414135	Anil Kumar Maurya	Bahujan Samaj Party	257379	156756
Uttar Pradesh	77	Varanasi	GEN	Narendra Modi	Bharatiya Janata Party	581022	Arvind Kejriwal	Aam Aadmi Party	209238	371784
Uttar Pradesh	78	Bhadohi	GEN	Virendra Singh	Bharatiya Janata Party	403544	Rakesh Dhar Tripathi	Bahujan Samaj Party	245505	158039
Uttar Pradesh	79	Mirzapur	GEN	Anupriya Singh Patel	Apna Dal	436536	Samudra Bind	Bahujan Samaj Party	217457	219079
Uttar Pradesh	80	Robertsganj	(SC)	Chhotelal	Bharatiya Janata Party	378211	Sharada Prasad	Bahujan Samaj Party	187725	190486
Uttarakhand	1	Tehri Garhwal	GEN	Mala Rajya Laxmi Shah	Bharatiya Janata Party	446733	Saket Bahuguna	Indian National Congress	254230	192503
Uttarakhand	2	Garhwal	GEN	B. C. Khanduri	Bharatiya Janata Party	405690	Harak Singh Rawat	Indian National Congress	221164	184526
Uttarakhand	3	Almora	(SC)	Ajay Tamta	Bharatiya Janata Party	348186	Pradeep Tamta	Indian National Congress	252496	95690
Uttarakhand	4	Nainital–Udhamsingh Nagar	GEN	Bhagat Singh Koshyari	Bharatiya Janata Party	636769	K. C. Singh Baba	Indian National Congress	352052	284717
Uttarakhand	5	Haridwar	GEN	Ramesh Pokhriyal	Bharatiya Janata Party	592320	Renuka Rawat	Indian National Congress	414498	177822
West Bengal	1	Cooch Behar	(SC)	Renuka Sinha	All India Trinamool Congress	526499	Dipak Kumar Roy	All India Forward Bloc	439392	87107
West Bengal	2	Alipurduars	(SC)	Dasrath Tirkey	All India Trinamool Congress	362453	Manohar Tirkey	Revolutionary Socialist Party	341056	21397
West Bengal	3	Jalpaiguri	(SC)	Bijoy Chandra Barman	All India Trinamool Congress	494773	Mahendra Kumar Roy	Communist Party of India (Marxist)	425167	69606
West Bengal	4	Darjeeling	GEN	S.S.Ahluwalia	Bharatiya Janata Party	488257	Bhai Chung Bhutia	All India Trinamool Congress	291018	197239
West Bengal	5	Raiganj	GEN	Md. Salim	Communist Party of India (Marxist)	317515	Deepa Dasmunsi	Indian National Congress	315881	1634
West Bengal	6	Balurghat	GEN	Arpita Ghosh	All India Trinamool Congress	409641	Bimalendu Sarkar	Revolutionary Socialist Party	302677	106964
West Bengal	7	Maldaha Uttar	GEN	Mausam Noor	Indian National Congress	388609	Khagen Murmu	Communist Party of India (Marxist)	322904	65705
West Bengal	8	Maldaha Dakshin	GEN	Abu Hasem Khan Chowdhury	Indian National Congress	380291	Bisnu Pada Roy	Bharatiya Janata Party	216180	164111
West Bengal	9	Jangipur	GEN	Abhijit Mukherjee	Indian National Congress	378201	Muzaffar Hossain	Communist Party of India (Marxist)	370040	8161
West Bengal	10	Baharampur	GEN	Adhir Ranjan Chowdhury	Indian National Congress	583549	Indranil Sen	All India Trinamool Congress	226982	356567
West Bengal	11	Murshidabad	GEN	Badaruddoza Khan	Communist Party of India (Marxist)	426947	Abdul Mannan Hossain	Indian National Congress	408494	18453
West Bengal	12	Krishnanagar	GEN	Tapas Paul	All India Trinamool Congress	438789	Jha Shantanu	Communist Party of India (Marxist)	367534	71255
West Bengal	13	Ranaghat	(SC)	Tapas Mandal	All India Trinamool Congress	590451	Archana Biswas	Communist Party of India (Marxist)	388684	201767
West Bengal	14	Bangaon	(SC)	Mamata Thakur	All India Trinamool Congress	539999	Debesh Das	Communist Party of India (Marxist)	328214	211785
West Bengal	15	Barrackpore	GEN	Dinesh Trivedi	All India Trinamool Congress	479206	Subhashini Ali	Communist Party of India (Marxist)	272433	206773
West Bengal	16	Dum Dum	GEN	Saugata Roy	All India Trinamool Congress	483244	Asim Kumar Dasgupta	Communist Party of India (Marxist)	328310	154934
West Bengal	17	Barasat	GEN	Dr. Kakali Ghoshdostidar	All India Trinamool Congress	525387	Dr. Mortoza Hossain	All India Forward Bloc	352246	173141
West Bengal	18	Basirhat	GEN	Idris Ali	All India Trinamool Congress	492326	Nurul Huda	Communist Party of India	382667	109659
West Bengal	19	Jaynagar	(SC)	Pratima Mondal	All India Trinamool Congress	494746	Subhas Naskar	Revolutionary Socialist Party	386362	108384
West Bengal	20	Mathurapur	(SC)	Choudhury Mohan Jatua	All India Trinamool Congress	627761	Rinku Naskar	Communist Party of India (Marxist)	489325	138436
West Bengal	21	Diamond Harbour	GEN	Abhishek Banerjee	All India Trinamool Congress	508481	Dr. Abul Hasnat	Communist Party of India (Marxist)	437183	71298
West Bengal	22	Jadavpur	GEN	Sugata Bose	All India Trinamool Congress	584244	Sujan Chakraborty	Communist Party of India (Marxist)	459041	125203
West Bengal	23	Kolkata Dakshin	GEN	Subrata Bakshi	All India Trinamool Congress	431715	Tathagata Roy	Bharatiya Janata Party	295376	136339
West Bengal	24	Kolkata Uttar	GEN	Sudip Bandyopadhyay	All India Trinamool Congress	343687	Rahul Sinha	Bharatiya Janata Party	247461	96226
West Bengal	25	Howrah	GEN	Prasun Banerjee	All India Trinamool Congress	488461	Sridip Bhattacharya	Communist Party of India (Marxist)	291505	196956
West Bengal	26	Uluberia	GEN	Sultan Ahmed	All India Trinamool Congress	570785	Sabir Uddin Molla	Communist Party of India (Marxist)	369563	201222
West Bengal	27	Serampore	GEN	Kalyan Banerjee	All India Trinamool Congress	514933	Tirthankar Ray	Communist Party of India (Marxist)	362407	152526
West Bengal	28	Hooghly	GEN	Dr. Ratna De (Nag)	All India Trinamool Congress	614312	Pradip Saha	Communist Party of India (Marxist)	425228	189084
West Bengal	29	Arambagh	(SC)	Aparupa Poddar	All India Trinamool Congress	748764	Saktimohan Malik	Communist Party of India (Marxist)	401919	346845
West Bengal	30	Tamluk	GEN	Adhikari Suvendu	All India Trinamool Congress	716928	Sekh Ibrahim Ali	Communist Party of India (Marxist)	470447	246481
West Bengal	31	Kanthi	GEN	Adhikari Sisir Kumar	All India Trinamool Congress	676749	Sinha Tapas	Communist Party of India (Marxist)	447259	229490
West Bengal	32	Ghatal	GEN	Adhikari Deepak (Dev)	All India Trinamool Congress	685696	Santosh Rana	Communist Party of India	424805	260891
West Bengal	33	Jhargram	(ST)	Uma Saren	All India Trinamool Congress	674504	Pulin Bihari Baske	Communist Party of India (Marxist)	326621	347883
West Bengal	34	Medinipur	GEN	Sandhya Roy	All India Trinamool Congress	579860	Prabodh Panda	Communist Party of India	395194	184666
West Bengal	35	Purulia	GEN	Dr. Mriganka Mahato	All India Trinamool Congress	468277	Narahari Mahato	All India Forward Bloc	314400	153877
West Bengal	36	Bankura	GEN	Sreemati Dev Varma (Moon Moon Sen)	All India Trinamool Congress	483455	Acharia Basudeb	Communist Party of India (Marxist)	384949	98506
West Bengal	37	Bishnupur	(SC)	Khan Saumitra	All India Trinamool Congress	578870	Susmita Bauri	Communist Party of India (Marxist)	429185	149685
West Bengal	38	Bardhaman Purba	(SC)	Sunil Kumar Mondal	All India Trinamool Congress	574660	Iswar Chandra Das	Communist Party of India (Marxist)	460181	114479
West Bengal	39	Bardhaman-Durgapur	GEN	Mamtaz Sanghamita	All India Trinamool Congress	554521	Sk. Saidul Haque	Communist Party of India (Marxist)	447190	107331
West Bengal	40	Asansol	GEN	Babul Supriyo	Bharatiya Janata Party	419983	Dola Sen	All India Trinamool Congress	349503	70480
West Bengal	41	Bolpur	(SC)	Anupam Hazra	All India Trinamool Congress	630693	Dome Ramchandra	Communist Party of India (Marxist)	394581	236112
West Bengal	42	Birbhum	GEN	Satabdi Roy (Banerjee)	All India Trinamool Congress	460568	Dr. Elahi Kamre Muhammad	Communist Party of India (Marxist)	393305	6726
