= Prabhatsinh Pratapsinh Chauhan =

Indian politician (1941–2023)

Member of Parliament, Lok Sabha
- In office 16 May 2009 – 23 May 2019
- Succeeded by: Ratansinh Rathod
- Constituency: Panchmahal, Gujarat

Personal details
- Born: 15 June 1941 Godhra, Bombay Province, British India
- Died: 26 October 2023 (aged 82)
- Citizenship: Indian
- Party: Bharatiya Janata Party.
- Spouse: Mrs. Ranilaben.
- Education: Shri K.K. High School, Vejalpur, Panchmahal.
- Profession: Agriculturist, Educationist; Social worker & Politician.
- Committees: Committee on Chemicals and Fertilizers (Member).

Prabhatsinh Pratapsinh Chauhan (15 June 1941 – 26 October 2023) was an Indian politician who was a member of the 15th Lok Sabha. He represented the Panchmahal constituency of Gujarat and was a member of the Bharatiya Janata Party (BJP) political party.

== Life and career ==
Chauhan was educated at Shri K.K. High School, Vejalpur in Panchmahal. The highest qualification attained by him was the HSSC (10th). He was an agriculturist, educationist and social worker before joining politics.

Prabhatsinh Pratapsinh Chauhan died on 26 October 2023, at the age of 82.

== Posts held ==
#	From	To	Position
01	1975	1980	Sarpanch, Mehlol Garampanchayat
02	1975	1980	Member, Taluka Panchayat Godhra
03	1980	1990	Member, District Panchayat Education Committee
04	1982	1990	Member, Gujarat Legislative Assembly (two terms)
05	1995	2002	Member, Gujarat Legislative Assembly (two terms)
06	1998	2002	Deputy Minister, Forest & Environment, Govt. of Gujarat
07	2004	2007	Minister of State, Tribal Development, Govt. of Gujarat
08	2004	2004	Minister of State, Cow breading, Devsthan & Yatradham, Govt. of Gujarat
09	2009	-	Elected to 15th Lok Sabha
10	2009	-	Member, Committee on Chemicals and Fertilizers

== See also ==
- List of members of the 15th Lok Sabha of India
- Politics of India
- Parliament of India
- Government of India
