= Godhra Assembly constituency =

Legislative Assembly constituency in Gujarat State, India

Coordinates: 22.78°N 73.62°E

Godhra
- Constituency No. 126 for the State Legislative Assembly

Constituency details
- Country: India
- State: Gujrat
- District: Panchmahal
- Lok Sabha constituency: Panchmahal
- Established: 2007
- Total electors: 279,773
- Reservation: None

Member of Legislative Assembly
- Incumbent C.K Raulji
- Party: Bharatiya Janata Party
- Elected year: 2022

Godhra is one of the 182 Legislative Assembly constituencies of Gujarat state in India. It is part of Panchmahal district and a part of Panchmahal Loksabha seat.

== List of segments ==
This assembly seat represents the following segments,

1. Godhra Taluka (Part) Villages – Sampa, Bakhkhar, Tarvadi, Chhavad, Pipaliya, Bodidra Bujarg, Dholi, Vansiya, Khajuri Sampa, Mor Dungara, Nasirpur, Chhabanpur, Samli, Padhiyar, Vinzol, Daruniya, Dhanol( Jangle), Govindi, Kanku Thambhla, Chanchopa, Kanajiya, Orwada, Kevadiya, Chanchelav, Erandi, Kotda, Jafrabad, Bhamaiya, Pandva, Betiya, Vavadi Khurd, Veganpur, Tuwa, Gusar, Goli, Bhima, Gavasi, Harkundi, Ambali, Vavadi Bujarg, Paravdi, Chundadi, Gadh, Ladpur, Vadelav, Sankali, Angaliya, Bamroli Khurd, Gadukpur, Dayal, Lilesara, Chikhodra, Hamirpur, Rupanpura, Nani Kantadi, Raisingpura, Ranipura, Chanchpur, Ratanpur (Reliya), Kalyana, Asardi, Bhalodiya, Reliya, Ankadiya, Veraiya, Vatlav, Tarboradi, Pratappura, Rampura (Jodka), Dhanol, Isrodiya, Mahelol, Bhanpura, Karanpura, Popatpura, Vanakpur, Mahuliya, Chhariya, Kaliya Kuwa, Rinchhiya, Tajpur, Thana Garjan, Sarangpur, Jitpura, Bhalaniya, Bhatpura, Torna, Ladupura, Achhala, Godhra (M).

== Member of Legislative Assembly ==
Year	Member	Picture	Party
2007	C.K Raulji		Indian National Congress
2012	C.K Raulji		Indian National Congress
2017	C.K Raulji		Bharatiya Janata Party
2022	C.K Raulji		Bharatiya Janata Party

== Election results ==
=== 2022 ===
2022 Gujarat Legislative Assembly election: Godhra
Party	Candidate	Votes	%	±%
BJP	C.K. Raulji	96,223	51.65	
INC	Rashmitaben Dhushyantsinh Chauhan	61,025	32.76	
AAP	Rajeshbhai Somabhai Patel	11,827	6.35	
AIMIM	Mufti Hasan Kachaba	9,508	5.10	
NOTA	None of the Above	3,548	1.90	
Majority		35,198	18.89	
Turnout		1,86,767		
BJP hold		Swing		

=== 2017 ===
2017 Gujarat Legislative Assembly election: Godhra
Party	Candidate	Votes	%	±%
BJP	C.K Raulji	75,149	42.00	
INC	Parmar Rajendrasinh Balvantsinh	74,891	41.86	
IND	Parmar Jashvantsinh Salamsinh	18,856	10.54	
NOTA	None of the above	3,050	1.70	
Majority		258	0.15	
Turnout		1,79,204	70.97	
BJP gain from INC		Swing		

=== 2012 ===
2012 Gujarat Legislative Assembly election: Godhra
Party	Candidate	Votes	%	±%
INC	C K Raulji	73,367	45.94	
BJP	Pravinsinh Chauhan	70,499	44.14	
IND	Patel Rameshbhai Ravjibhai	5,744	3.60	
IND	Mayurkumar Jashvantlal Patel	5,233	3.28	
Majority		2,868	1.80	
Turnout		1,59,711	72.54	
INC hold		Swing		

== See also ==
- List of constituencies of Gujarat Legislative Assembly
- Panchmahal district
- Gujarat Legislative Assembly
