= Kalol, Panchmahal Assembly constituency =

Legislative Assembly constituency in Gujarat State, India

Coordinates: 22.61°N 73.46°E

Kaalol
- Constituency No. 127 for the Gujarat Legislative Assembly

Constituency details
- Country: India
- Region: Western India
- State: Gujarat
- District: Panchmahal
- Lok Sabha constituency: Panchmahal
- Established: 1962
- Total electors: 258,323
- Reservation: None

Member of Legislative Assembly
- 15th Gujarat Legislative Assembly
- Incumbent Fatesinh Vakhatsinh Chauhan
- Party: Bharatiya Janata Party
- Elected year: 2022

Kaalol is one of the 182 Legislative Assembly constituencies of Gujarat state in India. It is part of Panchmahal district.

== List of segments ==
This assembly seat represents the following segments,

1. Kalol Taluka
2. Ghoghamba Taluka (Part) Villages – Jorapura (Vangarva), Vangarva, Shaniyada, Ranipura (Damavav), Damavav, Khilodi, Rinchhwani, Albeta, Khan Patla, Sajora, Padedi, Simaliya, Jambuvaniya, Guneshiya, Kothayadi, Sherpura, Damanpura, Dantol, Bhilod, Gajipura (Kanpur), Kantaveda, Bhojpura, Goya Sundal, Kothara, Vav kulli, Chathi, Bor, Chatha, Kantu, Malu, Kanpur, Navagam, Jorapura (Davadra), Davadra, Mulani Kapadi, Gajapura (Kantu), Gundi, Khadpa, Gorada, Ambakhunt, Uncha Beda, Kharod, Gamani, Galibili, Godli, Vanskod, Nurapura, Ghogha

== Members of Legislative Assembly ==
Year	Member	Image	Party
2007	Arvindsinh Rathod		Bharatiya Janata Party
2012	Arvindsinh Rathod		Bharatiya Janata Party
2017	Sumanben Chauhan		Bharatiya Janata Party
2022	Fatesinh Vakhatsinh Chauhan		Bharatiya Janata Party

== Election results ==
=== 2022 ===
Gujarat Assembly election, 2022:Kalol, Panchmahal Assembly constituency
Party	Candidate	Votes	%	±%
BJP	Fatesinh Chauhan	141,686	75.03	
INC	Prabhatsinh Pratapsinh Chauhan	26,007	13.77	
AAP	Dineshbhai Kanubhai Baria	9,393	4.97	
NOTA	None of the above	3,992	2.11	
Majority		115,679	61.26	
Turnout				
Registered electors		255,752		
BJP hold		Swing		

=== 2017 ===
Gujarat Assembly Election, 2017: Kaalol
Party	Candidate	Votes	%	±%
BJP	Sumanben Chauhan	103,028	60.91	+16.14
INC	Pradyumansinh Parmar (Panchmahal Zeroxwala)	53,751	31.78	+6.44
Majority		49,277	29.13	+9.71
Turnout		1,69,152	72.38	−1.6
BJP hold		Swing		

=== 2012 ===
Gujarat Assembly Election, 2012: Kalol
Party	Candidate	Votes	%	±%
BJP	Arvindsinh Rathod	69275	44.77	
INC	Rajendrasinh Jadav	39219	25.34	
Majority		30056	19.42	
Turnout		154741	73.98	
BJP hold		Swing		

== See also ==
- List of constituencies of Gujarat Legislative Assembly
- Gujarat Legislative Assembly
