= Gujarati grammar =

Grammar of the Gujarati language

The grammar of the Gujarati language is the study of the word order, case marking, verb conjugation, and other morphological and syntactic structures of the Gujarati language, an Indo-Aryan language native to the Indian state of Gujarat and spoken by the Gujarati people. This page overviews the grammar of standard Gujarati, and is written in a romanization (see Gujarati script#Romanization). Hovering the mouse cursor over underlined forms will reveal the appropriate English translation.

== Nominals ==
=== Nouns ===
Gujarati has three genders, two numbers, and three cases (nominative, oblique/vocative, and to a certain extent, locative). Nouns may be divided into declensional subtypes: marked nouns displaying characteristic declensional vowel terminations, and unmarked nouns which do not. These are the paradigms for the termination —

	Nom.		Obl./Voc.		Loc.
	Sg.	Pl.	Sg.	Pl.	Loc.
Masc.	-ઓ o	-આ ā			-એ e
Neut.	-ઉં ũ	-આં ā̃	-આ ā	-આં ā̃	-એ e
Fem.	-ઈ ī				

Two things must be noted about the locative case and its limited nature. First, it only exists as a case for masculines and neuters, which is why the corresponding feminine cell has been blanked out. Rather, for marked feminine and unmarked nouns the locative is a postposition, an issue addressed later in the article. Second, there is no distinction of gender.

Furthermore, there also exists in Gujarati a plural marker -ઓ (o). Unlike the English plural it is not mandatory, and may be left unexpressed if plurality is already expressed in some other way: by explicit numbering, agreement, or the above declensional system (as is the case with nominative marked masculines and neuters). And yet despite the declensional system, ઓ (o) often gets tacked onto nominative marked masculine and neuter plurals anyway. This redundancy is called the double plural. Historically, the origin of this suffix is murky, but it is certainly morphological rather than lexical. It is new (18th century) and it is not attested in Old Gujarati, Middle Gujarati, and Old Western Rajasthani literature. It may simply be the case that it spread from an unrepresented dialect.

Thus combining both the declensional and plural suffixes, the following table outlines all possible Gujarati noun terminations —

		Nom.		Obl./Voc.		Loc.
		Sg.	Pl.	Sg.	Pl.	Loc.
M'd.	Masc.	-ઓ o	-આ(ઓ) ā(o)	-આ ā	-આઓ āo	-એ e
M'd.	Neut.	-ઉં ũ	-આં(ઓ) ā̃(o)	-આ ā	-આં(ઓ) ā̃(o)	-એ e
M'd.	Fem.	-ઈ ī	-ઈઓ īo	-ઈ ī	-ઈઓ īo	
unM'd.			-ઓ o		-ઓ o	

There are also several forms of feminines derived from masculine nouns that do not end in -ઓ (o).

Masc. (Sg.)	Fem. (Sg.)	Examples	
Masc. (Sg.)	Fem. (Sg.)	Masc.	Fem.
-ઇયો iyo	-ઇયેણ iyeṇ	ભાગિયો bhāgiyo	ભાગિયેણ bhāgiyeṇ
-ઇયો iyo	-ઇયણ iyaṇ	વાણિયો vāṇiyo	વાણિયણ vāṇiyaṇ
-ઇયો iyo	-ઇયાણી iyāṇī	વાણિયો vāṇiyo	વાણિયાણી vāniyāṇī
-ઈ ī	-ણી ṇī	હાથી hāthī	હાથણી hāthaṇī
-ઈ ī	-એણ eṇ		
-ઈ ī	-અણ aṇ	ધોબી dhobī	ધોબણ dhobaṇ
-ઉ u	-વ-(Fem. suffix) -v-	સાધુ sādhu હિંદુ hĩdu	સાધ્વી sādhvī હિંદવાણી hĩdvāṇī
unM'd.	-આ -ā	પંડિત pãḍit	પંડિતા pãḍitā
unM'd.	-ઈ -ī	દેવ dev	દેવી devī
unM'd.	-ડી -ḍī	ભીલ bhīl	ભીલડી bhīlaḍī
unM'd.	-ણી -ṇī	પિશાચ piśāc	પિશાચણી piśācaṇī
unM'd.	-આણી -āṇī	રજપૂત rajpūt	રજપૂતાણી rajpūtāṇī
unM'd.	-એણ -eṇ	વાઘ vāgh	વાઘેણ vāghēṇ
unM'd.	-ણ -ṇ	સિંહ sĩh	સિંહણ sĩhaṇ
unM'd.	-વી -vī	નટ naṭ	નાટવી naṭavī

The next table, of noun declensions, shows the above suffix paradigms in action. Words: છોકરો (chokro) "boy", ડાઘો (ḍāgho) "stain", મહિનો (mahino) "month", કચરો (kacro) "rubbish", છોકરું (chokrũ) "child", કારખાનું (kārkhānũ) "factory", બારણું (bārṇũ) "door", અંધારું (andhārũ) "dark", છોકરી (chokrī) "girl", ટોપી (ṭopī) "hat", બાટલી (bāṭlī) "bottle", વીજળી (vījḷī) "electricity", વિચાર (vichār) "thought", રાજા (rājā) "king", ધોબી (dhobī) "washerman", બરફ (baraf) "ice", ઘર (ghar) "house", બહેન (bahen) "sister", મેદાન (medān) "field", પાણી (pāṇī) "water", બાબત (bābat) "matter", નિશાળ (niśāl) "school", ભાષા (bhāṣā) "language", ભક્તિ (bhakti) "devotion".

		Nom.		Obl./Voc.		Loc.
		Sg.	Pl.	Sg.	Pl.	Loc.
M'd.	Masc.	છોકરો chokro ડાઘો ḍāgho મહિનો mahino કચરો kacro	છોકરા(ઓ) chokrā(o) ડાઘા(ઓ) ḍāghā(o) મહિના(ઓ) mahinā(o)	છોકરા chokrā ડાઘા ḍāghā મહિના mahinā કચરા kacrā	છોકરાઓ chokrāo ડાઘાઓ ḍāghāo મહિનાઓ mahināo	મહિને mahine
M'd.	Neut.	છોકરું chokrũ કારખાનું kārkhānũ બારણું bārṇũ અંધારું andhārũ	છોકરાં(ઓ) chokrā̃(o) કારખાનાં(ઓ) kārkhānā̃(o) બારણાં(ઓ) bārṇā̃(o)	છોકરા chokrā કારખાના kārkhānā બારણા bārṇā અંધારા andhārā	છોકરાં(ઓ) chokrā̃(o) કારખાનાં(ઓ) kārkhānā̃(o) બારણાં(ઓ) bārṇā̃(o)	કારખાને kārkhāne
M'd.	Fem.	છોકરી chokrī ટોપી ṭopī બાટલી bāṭlī વીજળી vījḷī	chokrīo ṭopīo bāṭlīo	chokrī ṭopī bāṭlī vījḷī	chokrīo ṭopīo bāṭlīo	
unM'd.	Masc.	વિચાર vichār રાજા rājā ધોબી dhobī બરફ baraf	vichāro rājāo dhobīo	vichār rājā dhobī baraf	vichāro rājāo dhobīo	
unM'd.	Neut.	ઘર ghar બહેન bahen મેદાન medān પાણી pāṇī	gharo baheno medāno	ghar bahen medān pāṇī	gharo baheno medāno	
unM'd.	Fem.	બાબત bābat નિશાળ niśāḷ ભાષા bhāṣā ભક્તિ bhakti	bābato niśāḷo bhāṣāo	bābat niśāḷ bhāṣā bhakti	bābato niśāḷo bhāṣāo	

- The last entry of each gender category is a mass noun.
- Some count nouns are averse to taking the plural marker: bhāg "portion(s), દાંત dā̃t "tooth(/teeth)", પગ pag "foot(/feet)", ચણા caṇā "chick peas", etc.
- Regarding nouns that terminate in ī:
  - Rather than marking femininity, ī can sometimes denote vocation or attribute, most often in indicating (male) persons: ādmī "man" (lit. "of Ādam"), baṅgāḷī "Bengali", śāstrī "scholar" (lit. "scripture-ist"), ṭapālī "postman".
  - Some male relations end in āī: bhāī "brother", jamāī "daughter's husband", vevāī "child's father-in-law".
  - Some derive from male Sanskrit -in : hāthī "elephant", or neuter Sanskrit -iyam, -ījam, etc.: pāṇī "water", marī "black pepper", bī "seed".
- Many feminine Sanskrit loanwords end in ā. i.e. bhāṣā "language", āśā "hope", icchā "intention".
- Many Sanskrit loanwords orthographically end in i, though in Gujarati there is now no phonetic difference between i and ī, so those words could just as well be held as marked feminines.
- In the end, unmarked nouns probably outnumber marked ones, though many marked nouns are highly frequent. Marked or not, the bases of the gender of nouns are these —
  1. Biological: animates. Thus a chokrī "girl" is feminine, a baḷad "bull" is masculine, etc.
  2. Perceived: animates. Some animals have the propensity to be addressed and cast as being of one gender over the others, across the board, regardless of the biological gender of the specific organism being referred to. Thus spiders are masculine: karoḷiyo, cats feminine: bilāṛī, and rabbits neuter: saslũ. These three can be cast into other genders if such specificity is desired, but as explained that would be deviation from the default rather than a scenario of three equally valid choices.
  3. Size. An object can come in differently gender-marked versions, based on size. Masculine is big, getting smaller down through neuter and then feminine; neuter can sometimes be pejorative. Hence, camco "big spoon" and camcī "small spoon", and vāṛko "big bowl" and vāṛkī "small bowl". The same can apply to animates (animals) that fall under the second rule just above. One would think saslo to be "male rabbit", but it's more so "big rabbit".
  4. For the rest there is no logic to gender, which must simply be memorized by the learner. irādo "intention (m)", māthũ "head (n)", and mahenat "effort (f)" are neither animates possessing biological gender nor a part of a set of differently-sized variants; their gender is essentially inexplicable.

=== Adjectives ===
Adjectives may be divided into declinable and indeclinable categories. Declinables are marked, taking the appropriate declensional termination for the noun they qualify. One difference from nouns however is that adjectives do not take the plural marker -o. Neut. nom. sg. (-ũ) is the citation form. Indeclinable adjectives are completely invariable. All adjectives can be used either attributively, predicatively, or substantively.

- Examples of declinable adjectives: moṭũ "big", nānũ "small", jāṛũ "fat", sārũ "good", kāḷũ "black", ṭhaṇḍũ "cold", gā̃ṛũ "crazy".
- Examples of indeclinable adjectives: kharāb "bad", sāf "clean", bhārī "heavy", sundar "beautiful", kaṭhaṇ "hard", lāl "red".

Declinable adjective sārũ "good" in attributive use
		Nom.		Obl./Voc.		Loc.
		Sg.	Pl.	Sg.	Pl.	Loc.
M'd.	Masc.	sāro chokro	sārā chokrā(o)	sārā chokrā	sārā chokrāo	sāre mahine
M'd.	Neut.	sārũ chokrũ	sārā̃ chokrā̃(o)	sārā chokrā	sārā̃ chokrā̃(o)	sāre kārkhāne
M'd.	Fem.	sārī chokrī	sārī chokrīo	sārī chokrī	sārī chokrīo	
unM'd.	Masc.	sāro vichār sāro rājā sāro dhobī sāro baraf	sārā vichāro sārā rājāo sārā dhobīo	sārā vichār sārā rājā sārā dhobī sārā baraf	sārā vichāro sārā rājāo sārā dhobīo	
unM'd.	Neut.	sārũ ghar sārũ medān sārũ pāṇī	sārā̃ gharo sārā̃ medāno	sārā ghar sārā medān sārā pāṇī	sārā̃ gharo sārā̃ medāno	
unM'd.	Fem.	sārī bābat sārī niśāḷ sārī bhāṣā sārī bhakti	sārī bābato sārī niśāḷo sārī bhāṣāo	sārī bābat sārī niśāḷ sārī bhāṣā sārī bhakti	sārī bābato sārī niśāḷo sārī bhāṣāo	

Indeclinable adjective kharāb "bad" in attributive use
		Nom.		Obl./Voc.		Loc.
		Sg.	Pl.	Sg.	Pl.	Loc.
M'd.	Masc.	kharāb chokro kharāb ḍāgho kharāb mahino kharāb kacro	kharāb chokrā(o) kharāb ḍāghā(o) kharāb mahinā(o)	kharāb chokrā kharāb ḍāghā kharāb mahinā kharāb kacrā	kharāb chokrāo kharāb ḍāghāo kharāb mahināo	kharāb mahine
M'd.	Neut.	kharāb chokrũ kharāb kārkhānũ kharāb bārṇũ kharāb andhārũ	kharāb chokrā̃(o) kharāb kārkhānā̃(o) kharāb bārṇā̃(o)	kharāb chokrā kharāb kārkhānā kharāb bārṇā kharāb andhārā	kharāb chokrā̃(o) kharāb kārkhānā̃(o) kharāb bārṇā̃(o)	kharāb kārkhāne
M'd.	Fem.	kharāb chokrī kharāb vījḷī	kharāb chokrīo	kharāb chokrī kharāb vījḷī	kharāb chokrīo	
unM'd.	Masc.	kharāb vicār kharāb rājā kharāb dhobī kharāb baraf	kharāb vicāro kharāb rājāo kharāb dhobīo	kharāb vicār kharāb rājā kharāb dhobī kharāb baraf	kharāb vicāro kharāb rājāo kharāb dhobīo	
unM'd.	Neut.	kharāb ghar kharāb bahen kharāb medān kharāb pāṇī	kharāb gharo kharāb baheno kharāb medāno	kharāb ghar kharāb bahen kharāb medān kharāb pāṇī	kharāb gharo kharāb baheno kharāb medāno	
unM'd.	Fem.	kharāb bābat kharāb niśāḷ kharāb bhāṣā kharāb bhakti	kharāb bābato kharāb niśāḷo kharāb bhāṣāo	kharāb bābat kharāb niśāḷ kharāb bhāṣā kharāb bhakti	kharāb bābato kharāb niśāḷo kharāb bhāṣāo	

==== Comparatives and superlatives ====
Comparisons are made by using "than" (the postposition thī; see below) or "instead of" (nā kartā̃), and "more" (vadhu, vadhāre, etc.) or "less" (ochũ). The word for "more" is optional, while "less" is required, denoting that in the absence of either it's "more" than will be inferred.

Gujarati	Literal	Meaning
Gītā Gautamthī ū̃cī che	Gita is tall than Gautam	Gita is taller than Gautam
Gītā Gautam kartā̃ ū̃cī che	Gita is tall instead of Gautam	Gita is taller than Gautam
Gītā Gautamthī vadhāre ū̃cī che	Gita is more tall than Gautam	Gita is taller than Gautam
Gītā Gautamthī ochī ū̃cī che	Gita is less tall than Gautam	

In the absence of an object of comparison ("more" of course is now no longer optional):

Gujarati	Literal	Meaning
vadhu moṭo kūtro	The more big dog	The bigger dog
kūtro vadhu moṭo che	The dog more big is	The dog is bigger

Superlatives are made through comparisons with "all" (sau).

Gujarati	Literal	Meaning
sauthī sāf orṛo	The clean than all room	The cleanest room
orḍo sauthī sāf che	The room is clean than all	The room is the cleanest

Or by leading with mā̃ "in" postpositioned to the same adjective.

Gujarati	Literal	Meaning
nīcāmā̃ nīcī chokrī	The short in the short girl	The shortest girl

=== Postpositions ===
The sparse Gujarati case system serves as a springboard for Gujarati's grammatically functional postpositions, which parallel English's prepositions. It is their use with a noun or verb that is what necessitates the noun or verb taking the oblique case. There are six, one-syllable primary postpositions. Orthographically, they are bound to the words they postposition.

- નું (nũ) – genitive marker; variably declinable in the manner of an adjective. X નો(no)/નું(nũ)/ની(nī)/ના(nā)/નાં(nā̃)/ને(ne) Y has the sense "X's Y", with નો(no)/નું(nũ)/ની(nī)/ના(nā)/નાં(nā̃)/ને(ne) agreeing with Y.
- એ (e) – ergative marker; applied to subjects of transitive perfective verbs.
- ને (ne) – marks the indirect object (hence named "dative marker"), or, if definite, the direct object.
- થી (thī) – has a very wide range of uses and meanings:
  - "from"; બરોડાથી (Baroṛāthī) "from Baroda".
  - "from, of"; તારાથી ડરવું (tārāthī ḍarvũ) "to fear of you, to fear you".
  - "since"; બુધવારથી (budhvārthī) "since Wednesday".
  - "by, with"; instrumental marker.
  - "by, with, -ly"; adverbial marker.
  - "than"; for comparatives.
- એ (e) – a general locative, specifying senses such as "at", "during", etc. It is also used adverbially. As detailed previously, for the masculine and neuter genders it is a case termination, however to marked feminine and unmarked nouns it is a postpositional addition.
- પર (par) – "on".
- માં (mā̃) – "in".

Postpositions can postposition other postpositions. For example, થી (thī) (as "from") suffixing the two specific locatives can help to specify what type of "from" is meant (પરથી (parthī) "from off of", માંથી (mā̃thī) "from out of").

Beyond this are a slew of compound postpositions, composed of the genitive primary postposition નું (nũ) plus an adverb.

- નાં અંગે (nā aṅge) "with regard to, about"; ની અંદર (nī andar) "inside"; ની આગળ (nī āgaḷ) "in front (of)"; ની/ના ઉપર (nī/nā upar) "on top (of), above"; ના કરતાં (nā kartā̃) "rather than"; ને કારણે (ne kāraṇe) "because of"; ની જોડે (nī joḍe) "with"; ની તરફ (nī taraph) "towards"; ની તરીકે (nī tarīke) "as, in the character of"; ને દરમિયાન (ne darmiyān) "during"; ની નજીક (nī najīk) "near, close to"; etc.

The genitive bit is often optionally omissible with nouns, though not with pronouns (specifically, not with first and second person genitive pronouns, because, as will be seen, they have no outward, distinct, separable નું (nũ)).

=== Pronouns ===
==== Personal ====
Gujarati has personal pronouns for the first and second persons, while its third person system uses demonstrative bases, categorized deictically as proximate and distal.

The language has a T–V distinction in તું (tũ) and તમે (tame). The latter "formal" form is also grammatically plural. A similar distinction also exists when referring to someone in the third person.

Rare among modern Indo-Aryan languages, Gujarati has inclusive and exclusive we, આપણે (āpṇe) and અમે (ame).

	Personal					Demonstrative						Relative			Interrogative	
	1st pn.			2nd pn.		3rd pn.						Relative			Interrogative	
	Sg.	Pl.		Sg. & Inf.	Pl./ Form.	Prox.			Dist.			Relative			Interrogative	
	Sg.	Inc.	Exc.	Sg. & Inf.	Pl./ Form.	Inf.		Form.	Inf.		Form.	Inf.		Form.	Anim.	Inan.
	Sg.	Inc.	Exc.	Sg. & Inf.	Pl./ Form.	Sg.	Pl.	Form.	Sg.	Pl.	Form.	Sg.	Pl.	Form.	Anim.	Inan.
Nominative	હું hũ	આપણે āpṇe	અમે ame	તું tũ	તમે tame	આ ā	આઓ āo		તે te	તેઓ teo		જે je	જેઓ jeo		કોણ kɔṇ	શું śũ
Ergative	મેં mɛ̃	આપણે āpṇe	અમે ame	તેં tɛ̃	તમે tame	આણે āṇe	આઓએ āoe	આમણે āmṇe	તેણે tɛṇe	તેઓએ teoe	તેમણે tɛmṇe	જેણે jɛṇe	જેઓએ jeoe	જેમણે jɛmṇe	કોણે kɔṇe	
Dative	મને mane	આપણને āpaṇne	અમને amne	તને tane	તમને tamne	આને āne	આઓને āone	આમને āmne	તેને tɛne	તેઓને teone	તેમને tɛmne	જેને jɛne	જેઓને jeone	જેમને jɛmne	કોને kɔne	શેને śɛne
Genitive	મારું mārũ	આપણું āpṇũ	અમારું amārũ	તારું tārũ	તમારું tamārũ	આનું ānũ	આઓનું āonũ	આમનું āmnũ	તેનું tɛnũ	તેઓનું teonũ	તેમનું tɛmnũ	જેનું jɛnũ	જેઓનું jeonũ	જેમનું jɛmnũ	કોનું kɔnũ	શેનું śɛnũ

- તેઓ (teo) and its derivatives are quite rarely spoken and only very formally. More so it's તે લોકો (te loko) (lit. those people). The same goes for આઓ (āo) and જેઓ (jeo) and their derivatives.
- લોકો (loko) can be used to emphasize plurality elsewhere: આપણે લોકો (āpṇe loko), અમે લોકો (ame loko), તમે લોકો (tame loko).
- The initial ત (t) in distal forms is mostly dropped in speech; એ (e), એનું (enũ), એમનું (emnũ), etc.
- Second person formal આપ (āp) is borrowed from Hindi and might be used in rare, ultra-formal occasions (i.e. addressing a crowd).
- The system is regular for the remaining three postpositions (માં (mā̃), પર (par), થી (thī)), which suffix to an obliqued genitive base (invariably to આ (ā)): મારા (mārā), આપણા (āpṇā), અમારા (amārā), તારા (tārā), તમારા (tamārā), આના (ānā), આઓના (āonā), આમના (āmnā), તેના (tenā), તેઓના (teonā), તેમના (temnā), જેના (jenā), જેઓના (jeonā), જેમના (jemnā), કોના (kɔnā), શેના (śenā). For inanimates with માં (mā̃), the genitive bit gets omitted: આમાં (āmā̃), એમાં (emā̃), જેમાં (jemā̃), શેમાં (śemā̃).
- અમે (ame), અમને (amne), તમે (tame), તમને (tamne), તેણે (teṇe), તેમણે (temṇe), તેને (tene), તેમને (temne), જેણે (jeṇe), જેમણે (jemṇe), જેને (jene) also occur with murmured vowels.
- In speech શું(śũ) is most often not variable with regards to gender and number. It does have the oblique શે (śe), and although શા (śā) exists, it is rarely heard outside the phrase શા માટે (śā māṭe), meaning why (lit. for what reason), which can also be said without the declination, શું માટે (śũ māṭe)
- In speech, all words beginning with a શ (ś) are often heard as if only with a સ (s). Many speakers consider the શ (ś) to sound pedantic, however in writing, સું (sũ) and all other correspondingly spelled forms appear uneducated or rural.
- In speech, all words containing an એ (e) are also heard as if with and e. There would be no corresponding Gujarati spelling difference.
- In speech, આપણે (āpṇe) and all other forms are often pronounced as āpre, āprũ, etc. There would be no corresponding Gujarati spelling difference.

==== Derivates ====
	Interrogative	Relative	Demonstrative	
	Interrogative	Relative	Dist.	Prox.
Time	ક્યારે kyāre	જ્યારે jyāre	ત્યારે tyāre	અત્યારે atyāre
Place	ક્યાં kyā̃	જ્યાં jyā̃	ત્યાં tyā̃	અહીં ahī̃
Quantity	કેટલું keṭlũ	જેટલું jeṭlũ	તેટલું teṭlũ	આટલું āṭlũ
Size	કેવડું kevḍũ	જેવડું jevḍũ	તેવડું tevḍũ	આવડું āvḍũ
Quality	કેવું kevũ	જેવું jevũ	તેવું tevũ	આવું āvũ
Manner	કેમ kem	જેમ jem	તેમ tem	આમ ām

- There is a form કયું (kayũ) which means "which?".
- કેમ (kɛm) doesn't mean "how" as would be expected; rather it means "why". It does however mean "how" in the greeting કેમ છો (kɛm cho) "how are you?". It may also mean "how" when in reference to a spoken જેમ (jɛm), તેમ (tɛm), or આમ (ām) by means of parallel structure. "How" is usually expressed in these ways: કેવી રીતે (kevī rīte) (lit. "in what kind of way"), કયી રીતે (kayī rīte) (lit. "in which way"), and કેમનું (kɛmnũ).
- There are several other ways to say "now" in Gujarati: હમણાં (hamaṇā̃), અબઘડી (abghaḍī), હવે (have), and અટાણે (aṭāṇē).
- અત્રે/અત્ર (atre/atra), તત્રે/તત્ર (tatre/tatra), and યત્રે/યત્ર (yatre/yatra) may also be used to mean "here", "there" and "where", although their usage is far less common than the ones above. These are Sanskrit loanwords while the above are Sanskrit descendants.
- Just as in the pronouns where તે (te) becomes એ (e) colloquially, the words તેટલું (teṭlũ), તેવડું (tevṛũ), તેવું (tevũ), and તેમ (tɛm) also often lose their initial ત (t) when spoken and even written.
- ક્યારે (kyāre), જ્યારે (jyāre), ત્યારે (tyāre), અત્યારે (atyāre) are composed of the adverbial locative postpostion એ (e) and the bases ક્યાર (kyār), જ્યાર (jyār), ત્યાર (tyār), અત્યાર (atyār).
- People often use કેવું (kevũ) to ask about or ascertain a noun's gender. For example, બિલાડી કેવી (bilāḍī kēvī), would indicate that the noun બિલાડી (bilāḍī), "cat", is feminine.
- When appending postpositions such as (માં (mā̃), થી (thī), નું (nũ), etc.), they are attached to the oblique forms ક્યાર (kyār), કેટલા (keṭlā), કેવડા (kevṛā), કેવા (kevā), etc. resulting in ક્યારથી (kyārthī), કેટલામાં (keṭlāmā̃), etc.

== Verbs ==
=== Overview ===
The Gujarati verbal system is largely structured around a combination of aspect and tense/mood. Like the nominal system, the Gujarati verb involves successive layers of (inflectional) elements after the lexical base.

Gujarati has 2 aspects: perfective and imperfective, each having overt morphological correlates. These are participle forms, inflecting for gender, number, and case by way of a vowel termination, like adjectives. The perfective forms from the verb stem, followed by -ય(y)-, capped off by the agreement vowel and the imperfective forms with -ત(t)-.

Derived from હોવું (hɔvũ) "to be" are five copula forms: present, subjunctive, past, contrafactual (aka "past conditional"), and presumptive. Used both in basic predicative/existential sentences and as verbal auxiliaries to aspectual forms, these constitute the basis of tense and mood.

Non-aspectual forms include the infinitive, the imperative, and the agentive. Mentioned morphological conditions such the subjunctive, contrafactual, etc. are applicable to both copula roots for auxiliary usage with aspectual forms and to non-copula roots directly for often unspecified (non-aspectual) finite forms.

Finite verbal agreement is with the nominative subject, except in the transitive perfective, where it is with the direct object, with the erstwhile subject taking the ergative construction -એ(e) (see postpositions above). The perfective aspect thus displays split ergativity. The infinitive's agreement is also with its direct object, if paired with one.

Tabled just below on the left are the paradigms for the major gender and number agreement termination (GN), nominative case. Oblique paradigms differ from those introduced in #Nouns, being either thoroughly -આ(ā) or આં(ā̃). Locative -એ(e) is found in attributive adjectival function only in fixed expressions. To the right are the paradigms for the person and number agreement termination (PN), used by the subjunctive and future. Yellow fields: -એ (e) following C, ઉ (u), ઊ (ū); -ઈ (ī) following ઓ (o), ઓ (ɔ); -ય (y) following આ (ā).

(GN)	Sg.	Pl.
Masc.	-ઓ (o)	-આ (ā)
Neut.	-ઉં (ũ)	-આં (ā̃)
Fem.	-ઈ (ī)	

(PN)	Subj.		Fut.	
(PN)	Sg.	Pl.	Sg.	Pl.
1st	-ઉં (ũ)	-ઈએ (īe)		-ઉં (ũ)
2nd		-ઓ (o)		-ઓ (o)
3rd			-એ (e)	

=== Forms ===
The example verb is intransitive hālvũ "to shake", with various sample inflections. Much of the below chart information derives from Masica (1991:300–302, 323–325).

Non-aspectual
Aspectual
Non-finite

Inflection: neut. nom. sg. (GN = ũ, the citation form).
Root	*	hāl
Infinitive/ Desiderative	*-v-GN	hālvũ
Obl. Infinitive	*-v-ā	hālvā
Conjunctive	*-ī(ne)	hālī(ne)
Agentive	*-nār-GN	hālnār(ũ)
Gerund/ Prospective/ Obligatory	*-v-ā-n-GN	hālvānũ

Adjectivals. Inflection: neut. nom. sg. (GNC = ũ).
Perfective	*-el-(GN)	hālel(ũ)
Imperfective	*-t-GN	hāltũ

Adverbials. Obl. of adjectivals.
Perfective	*-y-ā̃	hālyā̃
Imperfective	*-t-ā̃	hāltā̃

Finite

Inflection: 2nd. pl. (PN = o, Pron. = tame).
Contingent Future	*-PN	hālo
Definite Future	*-(ī)ś-PN	hālśo

Inflection: all forms.
	2nd pn.		1st pn.
	Sg. & Inf.	Pl./Form.	Pl.
Imperative	hāl	hālo	hālīe
Future Imp.	hālje	hāljo	

Aspectuals plotted against copulas. Inflection: 3rd. masc. sg. (GN = o, PN = e, Pron. = te).
		Perfective	Imperfective
		*-y-GN	*-t-GN
Present	ch-PN	hālyo che	hāle che
Subjunctive	hɔ-PN	hālyo hɔī	hālto hɔī
Past	ha-t-GN	hālyo hato	hālto hato
Contrafactual	hɔ-t	hālyo hɔt	hālto hɔt
Presumptive	ha-(ī)ś-PN	hālyo haśe	hālto haśe
Unspecified		hālyo	hālto

Unsp. Contra.	*-(a)t	hālat

Notes

- The negation particles are na and nahi with the former standing before the copula (or if no copula, the aspectual form) and the latter generally after. A negation particle combines with present ch-PN however for the invariable nathī. An alternative to the past na hat-GN is nahot-GN.

Aff	ch-PN	hɔ-PN	ha-t-GN	hɔ-t	ha-(ī)ś-PN	
Neg	nathī	na hɔ-PN	na ha-t-GN	na hɔ-t	ha-(ī)ś-PN nahi	na, nahi

- Gujarati retains an aspectually unmarked form (*-PN) in the function of the Present Imperfective, although a marked form (hālto nathī) replaces it in the negative.
- Gujarati does not distinguish between habitual and continuous.
- When GN = ī then y is omitted. hālyo, but hālī.
- Some roots show vowel alternation:
  - ā/a : jā/ja "go", thā/tha "become, occur".
  - e/ɛ/a/ø : le/lɛ/la/l "take", de/dɛ/da/d "give".
  - o/u : jo/ju "see, look, watch", dho/dhu "wash".
  - ɔ/a/ø : hɔ/ha/h "be".
- In northern and central Gujarat, roots in -ā regularly have -a- before -īś- of future forms.
- Certain verb forms show suppletion in their perfective roots: ga- (jā "go"), kī- (kar "do" [in some dialects]), dī- (jo "see, look, watch" [in some dialects]).
- Instead of the general affix -y- in their perfectives a few vowel-terminating roots take dh and s-terminating roots ṭh.
  - dh : khā-dh- (khā "eat"), dī-dh- (de "give"), pī-dh- (pī "drink"), lī-dh- (le "take"), bī-dh- (bī "fear"), kī-dh- (kahe "say" [in addition to kah-y-]), kī-dh- (kar "do" [in addition to kar-y-]).
  - ṭh : nā-ṭh- (nās "flee"), pɛ-ṭh- (pɛs "enter"), bɛ-ṭh- (bɛs "sit"), dī-ṭh- (jo "see, look, watch" [in addition to jo-y-]).
  - t : sū-t- (sū "sleep").
- The ha in the past auxiliary ha-t-GN is omitted in speech after aspectual forms and negative na.
- Flexible order: hālto nathī ←→ nathī hālto.
- The future imperative is politer than the imperative, and using the future tense (questioningly: "will you...?") is politer still.

=== Causatives ===
Gujarati causatives are morphologically contrastive. Verbs can be causativized up to two times, to a double causative.

==== Single ====
Causatives are made by two main schemes involving alteration of the root.

- Lengthening of final vowel; shortening of a preceding vowel (if ū is the only vowel, then → o).
- Final ṭ → ḍ.

or

- Suffix v if ending in vowel or h.
- Shortening of vowel(s).
- Suffix: āv, āḍ, v, vḍāv, or eḍ.
- Sometimes nasalisation (anusvāra).

If the causativization is of a transitive, then the secondary agent, whom the subject "causes to" or "gets to" do whatever, is marked by the postposition nī pāse.

==== Double ====
Furthermore, that causative can be causativized again, for a double causative ("to cause to cause... "), with a possible tertiary agent.

- ḍāv suffixed to 1st causative suffix of āv.
- āv suffixed to 1st causative suffixes of āḍ and eḍ.
- Beyond this are irregular forms that must be memorized.

=== Passives ===
The passive has both periphrastic and morphological means of expression. The former has -mā̃ āvvũ postpositioned to infinitive; the latter has ā added to root, with certain phonological processes as work as well: if the root vowel is ā then it becomes a (See Gujarati phonology#ɑ-reduction) and if the root ends in a vowel then h or v is suffixed. Thus lakhvũ "to write" → lakhvāmā āvvũ, lakhāvũ "to be written". The post-position thī marks the agent, As in other New Indo-Aryan languages, formation of passives is not restricted to transitive verbs and has a restricted domain of usage except in special registers. Both intransitive and transitive may be grammatically passivized to show capacity, in place of compounding with the modal śakvũ "to be able". Lastly, intransitives often have a passive sense, or convey unintentional action.

== Sample text ==
એક માણસને બે દીકરા હતા. અને તેઓમાંના નાનાએ બાપને કહ્યું કે, બાપ, સંપતનો પહોંચતો ભાગ મને આપ, ને તેણે તેઓને પુંજી વહેંચી આપી.
Ēka māṇasanē bē dīkarā hatā. Anē tēōmāṁnā nānāē bāpanē kahyuṁ kē, bāpa, saṁpatanō pahōṁcatō bhāga mane āpa, nē tēṇē tēōnē puṁjī vahēṁcī āpī.
A to-man two sons were. And them-in-of by-the-younger to-the-father it-was-said that, "father, of-the-property the-arriving share to-me give," and by-him to-them the-stock having-divided was-given.

== Bibliography ==
- Cardona, George (1965), A Gujarati Reference Grammar, University of Pennsylvania Press.
- Cardona, George; Suthar, Babu (2003), "Gujarati", in Cardona, George; Jain, Dhanesh (eds.), The Indo-Aryan Languages, Routledge, ISBN 978-0-415-77294-5.
- Dave, Jadish (1995), Colloquial Gujarati (2004 ed.), Routledge, ISBN 0-415-09196-9.
- Dwyer, Rachel (1995), Teach Yourself Gujarati, London: Hodder and Stoughton, archived from the original on 2008-01-02.
- Lambert, H.M. (1971), Gujarati Language Course, Cambridge University Press.
- Masica, Colin (1991), The Indo-Aryan Languages, Cambridge: Cambridge University Press, ISBN 978-0-521-29944-2.
- Mistry, P.J. (2001), "Gujarati", in Garry, Jane; Rubino, Carl (eds.), An encyclopedia of the world's major languages, past and present, New England Publishing Associates.
- Taylor, G.P. (1908), The Student's Gujarati Grammar (2nd ed.), Bombay: Thacker & Co..
- Tisdall, W.S. (1892), A Simplified Grammar of the Gujarati Language, Kegan Paul, Trench, Trübner & Co..
