= Gujarati phonology =

The Gujarati language is an Indo-Aryan language native to the Indian state of Gujarat. Much of its phonology is derived from Sanskrit.

== Vowels ==
Vowels
	Front	Central	Back
Close	i		u
Close-mid	e	ə	o
Open-mid	ɛ	ə	ɔ
Open	(æ)	a	

- Sanskrit's phonemic vowel length has been lost. Vowels are long when nasalised or in a final syllable.
- Gujarati contrasts oral and nasal, and murmured and non-murmured vowels, except for /e/ and /o/. See #Murmur section for more.
- In absolute word-final position, the higher and lower vowels of the /e ɛ/ and /o ɔ/ sets vary.
- /ɛ/ and /ɔ/ developed in the 15th century. when Gujarati developed into a distinct language from Old Gujarati (spoken by Gurjars in northern Gujarat and western Rajasthan).
- /æ/ is found in English loanwords.

== Consonants ==
		Labial	Dental/ Alveolar	Retroflex	Postal./ Palatal	Velar	Glottal
Nasal		m	n	ɳ			
Plosive/ Affricate	tenuis	p	t	ʈ	tʃ	k	
Plosive/ Affricate	voiced	b	d	ɖ	dʒ	ɡ	
Plosive/ Affricate	aspirated	pʰ	tʰ	ʈʰ	tʃʰ	kʰ	
Plosive/ Affricate	murmured	bʱ	dʱ	ɖʱ	dʒʱ	ɡʱ	
Fricative	voiceless	(f)	s	(ʂ)	ʃ		
Fricative	voiced	(v)	(z)			(ɣ)	ɦ
Approximant		ʋ	l	ɭ	j	(w)	
Tap			ɾ	(ɽ)			

- A fourth nasal phoneme is postulated for the phones [ɲ, ŋ] and the nasalization of a preceding vowel [Ṽ]. Before velar and palatal stops, there is variation between these; e.g. [mɑ̃ɡʋũ ~ mɑŋɡʋũ] ('ask for'), [ɦĩtʃko ~ ɦĩɲtʃko] ('swing').
- Stops occurring at first members of clusters followed by consonants other than /ɾ, j, ʋ/ are unreleased; they are optionally unreleased in final position. The absence of release entails deaspiration of voiceless stops.
- Intervocalically and with murmuring of vowels, the voiced aspirated stops /ɡʱ, dʱ, bʱ/ have voiced spirant allophones [ɣ, ð, β]. Spirantization of non-palatal voiceless aspirates has been reported as well, including /pʰ/ being usually realised as [f] in the standard dialect.
- The two voiced retroflex plosives /ɖʱ, ɖ/ and the retroflex nasal /ɳ/ have flapped subphonemic allophones [ɽʱ, ɽ, ɽ̃]. The plosives /ɖʱ, ɖ/ are unflapped initially, geminated, and after nasal vowels; and flapped intervocalically, finally, and before or after other consonants. The nasal /ɳ/ is unflapped before retroflex plosives and intervocalically, and in final position varies freely between flapped and unflapped.
- /ʋ/ has [v] and [w] as allophones.
- The distribution of sibilants varies over dialects and registers.
  - Some dialects only have [s], others prefer [ʃ], while another system has them non-contrasting, with [ʃ] occurring contiguous to palatal segments. Retroflex [ʂ] still appears in clusters in which it precedes another retroflex: [spəʂʈ] ('clear').
  - Some speakers maintain [z] as well for Persian and English borrowings. Persian's /z/'s have by and large been transposed to /dʒ/ and /dʒʱ/: /dʒindɡi/ ('life') and /tʃidʒʱ/ ('thing'). The same cannot be so easily said for English: /tʃiz/ ('cheese'), which is rarely pronounced as /tʃidʒ/.
  - Lastly, a colloquial register has [s], or both [s] and [ʃ], debuccalised to voiceless [h]. For educated speakers speaking this register, this replacement does not extend to Sanskrit borrowings.

Phonotactical constraints include:

- /ɭ/ and /ɳ/ do not occur word-initially.
- Clusters occur initially, medially, and finally. Geminates occur only medially.
- Biconsonantal initial clusters beginning with stops have /ɾ/, /j/, /ʋ/, and /l/ as second members. In addition to these, in loans from Sanskrit the clusters /ɡn/ and /kʃ/ may occur.
  The occurrence of /ɾ/ as a second member in consonantal clusters is one of Gujarati's conservative features as a modern Indo-Aryan language. For example, languages used in Asokan inscriptions (3rd century BC) display contemporary regional variations, with words found in Gujarat's Girnar inscriptions containing clusters with /ɾ/ as the second member not having /ɾ/ in their occurrence in inscriptions elsewhere. This is maintained even to today, with Gujarati /tɾ/ corresponding to Hindi /t/ and /tt/.
- Initially, s clusters biconsonantally with /ɾ, j, ʋ, n, m/, and non-palatal voiceless stops.
- Triconsonantal initial clusters include /stɾ, spɾ, smɾ/ - most of which occur in borrowings.
- Geminates were previously treated as long consonants, but they are better analyzed as clusters of two identical segments. Two proofs for this:
  - The u in geminated uccār "pronunciation" sounds more like the one in clustered udgār ('utterance') than the one in shortened ucāṭ ('anxiety').
  - Geminates behave towards (that is, disallow) [ə]-deletion like clusters do.

Gemination can serve as intensification. In some adjectives and adverbs, a singular consonant before the agreement vowel can be doubled for intensification. #VCũ → #VCCũ.

big	[moʈũ]	[moʈʈũ]	big
straight	[sidʱũ]	[siddʱũ]	straight
considerably	[kʰɑsũ]	[kʰɑssũ]	considerably

== Stress ==
The matter of stress is not quite clear:

- Stress is on the first syllable, except when it doesn't have /a/ and the second syllable does.
- Stress is barely perceptible.
- Stress typically falls on the penultimate syllable of a word; however, if the penultimate vowel in a word with more than two syllables is a schwa, stress falls on the preceding syllable.

== ə-deletion ==
Schwa-deletion, along with a-reduction and [ʋ]-insertion, is a phonological process at work in the combination of morphemes. It is a common feature among Indo-Aryan languages, referring to the deletion of a stem's final syllable's /ə/ before a suffix starting with a vowel.

This does not apply for monosyllabic stems and consonant clusters. So, better put, #VCəC + V# → #VCCV#. It also doesn't apply when the addition is an o plural marker (see Gujarati grammar#Nouns) or e as an ergative case marker (see Gujarati grammar#Postpositions). It sometimes doesn't apply for e as a locative marker.

Stem			Suffix		Suffixed stem		C/V	Del	Notes
verb root	[keɭəʋ]	educate	[iʃ]	1st person singular, future	[keɭʋiʃ]	will educate	CVCəC + VC → CVCCVC	Yes	Polysyllabic stem with /ə/ in its final syllable, with a suffix starting with a vowel (verbal declension).
verb root	[səmədʒ]	understand	[jɑ]	masculine plural, perfective	[səmdʒjɑ]	understood	CVCəC + CV → CVCCCV	Yes	Polysyllabic stem with /ə/ in its final syllable, with a suffix starting with a semi-vowel (verbal declension).
verb root	[utəɾ]	descend	[to]	masculine singular, imperfective	[utəɾto]	descending	VCəC + CV → VCəCCV	No	Suffix starting with a consonant.
verb root	[təɾ]	swim, float	[ɛ]	2nd person singular, present	[təɾɛ]	swimming, floating	CəC + V → CəCV	No	Monosyllabic.
verb root	[ʋəɾɳəʋ]	describe	[i]	feminine, perfective	[ʋəɾɳəʋi]	described	CVCCəC + VC → CVCCəCVC	No	Consonant cluster.
verb root	[ɑɭoʈ]	wallow, roll	[iʃũ]	1st person plural, future	[ɑɭoʈiʃũ]	will wallow, roll	VCoC + VCV → VCoCVCV	No	Non-ə.
noun	[ɑɭəs]	laziness	[ũ]	adjectival marker	[ɑɭsũ]	lazy	VCəC + V → VCCV	Yes	Polysyllabic stem with /ə/ in its final syllable, with a suffix starting with a vowel (adjectival marking).
noun	[ʋəkʰət]	time	[e]	locative marker	[ʋəkte]	at (the) time	CVCəC + V → CVCCV	Yes	Sometimes yes — e as a locative marker.
noun	[diʋəs]	day	[e]	locative marker	[diʋəse]	on (the) day	CVCəC + V → CVCəCV	No	Sometimes no — e as a locative marker.
noun	[ɾəmət]	game	[o]	plural marker	[ɾəməto]	games	CVCəC + V → CVCəCV	No	Plural o number marker suffix.
adjective	[ɡəɾəm]	hot	[i]	noun marker	[ɡəɾmi]	heat	CVCəC + V → CVCCV	Yes	Polysyllabic stem with /ə/ in its final syllable, with a suffix starting with a vowel (noun marking).

== ɑ-reduction ==
A stem's final syllable's /ɑ/ will reduce to /ə/ before a suffix starting with /ɑ/. #ɑC(C) + ɑ# → #əC(C)ɑ#. This can be seen in the derivation of nouns from adjective stems, and in the formation of passive and causative forms of verb stems.

Stem		Suffix	Suffixed Stem			Reduced
cut	[kɑp]	[ɑ]	[kəpɑ]	be cut	Passive	Yes
cut	[kɑp]	[ɑʋ]	[kəpɑʋ]	cause to cut	Causative	Yes
cause to cut	[kəpɑʋ]	[ɑ]	[kəpɑʋɑ]	cause to be cut	Causative Passive	No (Note: It does not happen a second time.)
cause to cut	[kəpɑʋ]	[ɖɑʋ]	[kəpɑʋɖɑʋ]	cause to cause to cut	Double Causative	No
use	[ʋɑpəɾ]	[ɑ]	[ʋəpɾɑ] (Note: It can take place after an ə-deletion. #ɑCəC + ɑ# → #əCCɑ#.)	be used	Passive	Yes
long	[lɑmb]	[ɑi]	[ləmbɑi]	length	Noun	Yes

== [ʋ]-insertion ==
Between a stem ending in a vowel and its suffix starting with a vowel, a [ʋ] is inserted. #V + V# → #VʋV#. This can be seen in the formation of passive and causative forms of verb stems.

Stem		Suffix	Suffixed stem	
see	[dʒo]	[ɑ]	[dʒoʋɑ]	be seen
sing	[ɡɑ]	[ɑɽ]	[ɡəʋɑɽ]	cause to sing

The second example shows an ɑ-reduction as well.

== ə-insertion ==
ə finds itself inserted between the emphatic particle /dʒ/ and consonant-terminating words it postpositions.

one	[ek]	[ekədʒ]	one
that	[e]	[edʒ]	that

== Murmur ==
/ɦ/ serves as a source for murmur, of which there are three rules:

Rule		Formal (Note: Gujarati spelling reflects this mode. The script has no direct notation for murmur.)	Casual	English
1	Word-initial ɦV → V̤ (Note: Rule 1 creates allomorphs for nouns. For example, /ɦəd/ ('limit') by itself can be ə̤d, but can only be ɦəd in beɦəd ('limitless').)	[ɦəʋe]	[ə̤ʋe]	now
1	Word-initial ɦV → V̤	[ɦɑɽkũ]	[ɑ̤ɽkũ]	bone
2	əɦV_{non-high} → V̤_{non-high, more open}	[səɦelũ]	[sɛ̤lũ]	easy
2	əɦV_{non-high} → V̤_{non-high, more open}	[bəɦoɭũ]	[bɔ̤ɭũ]	large
2	əɦV_{non-high} → V̤_{non-high, more open}	[dəɦɑɽo]	[da̤ɽo] (Note: More open.)	day
3	ə/aɦV_{high} → ə̤/ɑ̤ (glide)	[ɾəɦi]	[ɾə̤j]	stayed
3	ə/aɦV_{high} → ə̤/ɑ̤ (glide)	[bəɦu]	[bə̤ʋ]	very

The table below compares declensions of the verbs [kəɾʋũ] ('to do') and [kɛ̤ʋũ] ('to say'). The former follows the regular pattern of the stable root /kəɾ/ serving as a point for characteristic suffixations. The latter, on the other hand, is deviant and irregular in this respect.

Infinitive	Perfective	Imperative	1sg. Future
[kəɾʋũ]	[kəɾjũ]	[kəɾo]	[kəɾiʃ]
[kɛ̤ʋũ]	[kəɦjũ]	[kɔ̤]	[kə̤jʃ]

The [kɛ̤ʋũ] situation can be explained through murmur. If to a formal or historical root of /kəɦe/ these rules are considered then predicted, explained, and made regular is the irregularity that is [kɛ̤ʋũ] (romanised as kahevũ).

Thus below are the declensions of [kɛ̤ʋũ] /ɦ/-possessing, murmur-eliciting root /kəɦe/, this time with the application of the murmur rules on the root shown, also to which a preceding rule must be taken into account:

0. A final root vowel gets deleted before a suffix starting with a non-consonant.

Rule	Infinitive	Perfective	Imperative	1sg. Future
	[kəɦe-ʋũ]	[kəɦe-jũ]	[kəɦe-o]	[kəɦe-iʃ]
0		[kəɦ-jũ]	[kəɦ-o]	[kəɦ-iʃ]
2	[kɛ̤-ʋũ]		[kɔ̤]	
3				[kə̤-jʃ]
→	[kɛ̤ʋũ]	[kəɦjũ]	[kɔ̤]	[kə̤jʃ]

However, in the end not all instances of /ɦ/ become murmured and not all murmur comes from instances of /ɦ/.

One other predictable source for murmur is voiced aspirated stops. A clear vowel followed by a voiced aspirated stop can vary with a pair gaining murmur and losing aspiration: #VCʱ ←→ #V̤C.

== Bibliography ==
- Campbell, G.L. (1991), "Gujarati", Compendium of the world's languages, volume 1. Abaza to Lusatian, New York: Routledge, pp. 541–545
- Cardona, George; Suthar, Babu (2003), "Gujarati", in Cardona, George; Jain, Dhanesh (eds.), The Indo-Aryan Languages, Routledge, ISBN 978-0-415-77294-5
- Dave, T.N. (1931), "Notes on Gujarati Phonology", Bulletin of the School of Oriental Studies, 6 (3): 673–678, doi:10.1017/S0041977X00093174, ISSN 1356-1898, JSTOR 607202, S2CID 169852062
- Firth, J.R. (1957), "Phonetic Observations on Gujarati", Bulletin of the School of Oriental and African Studies, 20 (1): 231–241, doi:10.1017/S0041977X00061802, JSTOR 610376, S2CID 130969268
- Masica, Colin (1991), The Indo-Aryan Languages, Cambridge: Cambridge University Press, ISBN 978-0-521-29944-2
- Mistry, P.J. (1996), "Gujarati Writing", in Daniels; Bright (eds.), The World's Writing Systems, Oxford University Press
- Mistry, P.J. (1997), "Gujarati Phonology", in Kaye, A.S (ed.), Phonologies of Asia and Africa, Winona Lake: Eisenbrauns
- Mistry, P.J. (2001), "Gujarati", in Garry, Jane; Rubino, Carl (eds.), An encyclopedia of the world's major languages, past and present, New England Publishing Associates
- Mistry, P.J. (2003), "Gujarati", in Frawley, William (ed.), International Encyclopedia of Linguistics, vol. 2 (2nd ed.), Oxford: Oxford University Press
- Pandit, P.B. (1961), "Historical Phonology of Gujarati Vowels", Language, 37 (1), Linguistic Society of America: 54–66, doi:10.2307/411249, JSTOR 411249
- Turner, Ralph Lilley (1921), "Gujarati Phonology", Journal of the Royal Asiatic Society, 53 (4): 505–544, doi:10.1017/S0035869X00149287
- Turner, Ralph Lilley (1915), "Indo-Aryan Nasals in Gujarati", Journal of the Royal Asiatic Society: 1033–1038
