= Sumanben Chauhan =

Indian politician

Member of Legislative Assembly, Gujarat
- Incumbent
- Assumed office 2017
- Preceded by: Arvindsinh Rathod
- Constituency: Kalol

Personal details
- Party: Bharatiya Janta Party
- Profession: Politician

Sumanben Chauhan is an Indian politician and a member of the Legislative Assembly of Gujarat in India. She represents the Kalol (state assembly constituency), which is in Panchmahal district, Gujarat.
