= 2019 Indian general election in Gujarat =

Indian lower house election in Gujarat

- 23 April 2019

26 seats
- Turnout: 64.51% (▲1.19%)
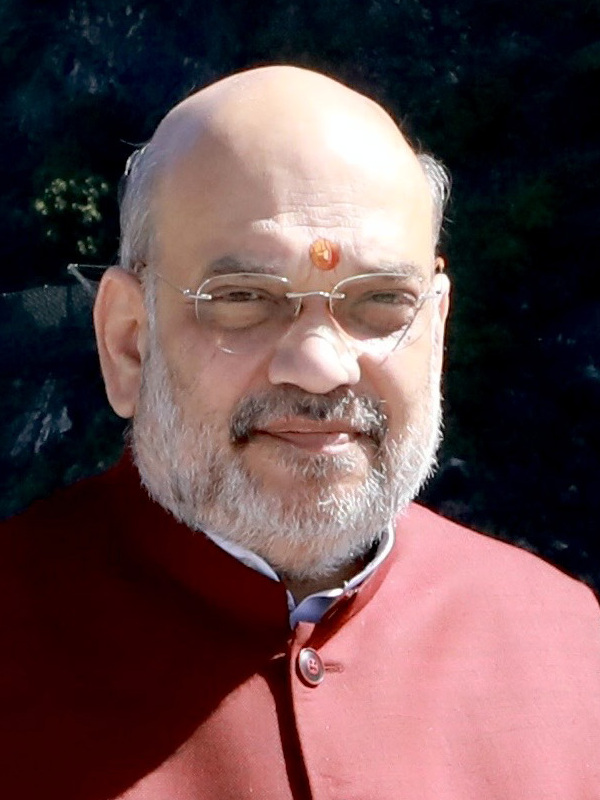

	First party	Second party
Leader	Amit Shah	Amit Chavda
Party	BJP	INC
Alliance	NDA	UPA
Leader's seat	Gandhinagar	Did not contest
Last election	26	0
Seats won	26	0
Seat change	Steady	Steady
Percentage	62.21%	32.11%
Swing	▲2.10	Steady
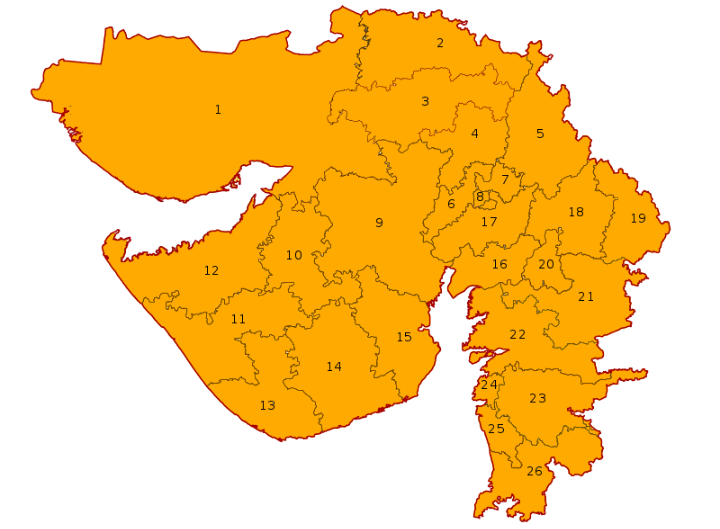
- Gujarat
Prime Minister before election
Narendra Modi
BJP
Prime Minister after election
Narendra Modi
BJP

The 2019 Indian general election were scheduled to be held in seven phases between April and May 2019 to constitute the 17th Lok Sabha. The Election Commission of India announced the polling date for all the 26 Lok Sabha constituencies in Gujarat and it was held on April 23 during the third phase of 2019 Indian general election. The results were declared on 23 May 2019 across the country.

== Parties and alliances ==
=== National Democratic Alliance ===
Party	Flag	Symbol	Leader	Seats contested
Bharatiya Janata Party			Narendra Modi	26

=== United Progressive Alliance ===
Party	Flag	Symbol	Leader	Seats contested
Indian National Congress			Amit Chavda	26

== Candidates ==
Election candidates are:
Constituency					
Constituency		NDA		UPA	
1	Kachchh	BJP	Vinodbhai Chavda	INC	Naresh N. Maheshwari
2	Banaskantha	BJP	Parbatbhai Patel	INC	Parthi Bhatol
3	Patan	BJP	Bharatsinhji Dabhi Thakor	INC	Jagdish Thakor
4	Mahesana	BJP	Shardaben Patel	INC	A J Patel
5	Sabarkantha	BJP	Dipsinh Rathod	INC	Rajendra Thakor
6	Gandhinagar	BJP	Amit Shah	INC	C. J. Chavada
7	Ahmedabad East	BJP	Hasmukh Patel	INC	Gitaben Rathva
8	Ahmedabad West	BJP	Kirit Solanki	INC	Raju Parmar
9	Surendranagar	BJP	Mahendra Munjapara	INC	Somabhai Patel
10	Rajkot	BJP	Mohan Kundariya	INC	Lalit Kagathara
11	Porbandar	BJP	Rameshbhai Dhaduk	INC	Lalit Vasoya
12	Jamnagar	BJP	Poonamben Maadam	INC	Murubhai Kandoriya Ahir
13	Junagadh	BJP	Rajesh Chudasama	INC	Punjabhai Vansh
14	Amreli	BJP	Naranbhai Kachhadia	INC	Paresh Dhanani
15	Bhavnagar	BJP	Bharti Shiyal	INC	Manhar Patel
16	Anand	BJP	Miteshbhai Patel	INC	Bharatsinh Solanki
17	Kheda	BJP	Devusinh Chauhan	INC	Bimal Shah
18	Panchmahal	BJP	Ratansinh Rathod	INC	V K Khant
19	Dahod	BJP	Jasvantsinh Bhabhor	INC	Babubhai Katara
20	Vadodara	BJP	Ranjanben Bhatt	INC	Prashant Patel
21	Chhota Udaipur	BJP	Gitaben Rathva	INC	Ranjit Mohansinh Rathwa
22	Bharuch	BJP	Mansukhbhai Vasava	INC	Sherkhan Abdul Shakur Pathan
23	Bardoli	BJP	Parbhubhai Vasava	INC	Tushar Chaudhary
24	Surat	BJP	Darshana Jardosh	INC	Ashok Adhevada
25	Navsari	BJP	C. R. Patil	INC	Dharmesh Bhimbhai Patel
26	Valsad	BJP	Dr. K C Patel	INC	Jitu Chaudhary

== Results ==
=== Results by Party ===
Party Name	Popular vote			Seats		
Party Name	Votes	%	±pp	Contested	Won	+/−
BJP	1,80,91,275	62.21	▲3.16	26	26	Steady
INC	93,37,084	32.11	▼0.75	26	0	Steady
Others	6,26,044	2.15	Steady	122	0	Steady
IND	6,26,629	2.15	▲0.07	197	0	Steady
NOTA	4,00,932	1.38	▼0.34			
Total	2,90,81,964	100%	-	371	26	-

=== Constituency wise ===
No	Constituency	Turnout	Winner	Party	Votes	Margin
1	Kachchh	58.71 ▼	Vinodbhai Chavda	Bharatiya Janata Party	637,034	305,513
2	Banaskantha	65.03 ▲	Parbatbhai Patel	Bharatiya Janata Party	679,108	368,296
3	Patan	62.45 ▲	Bharatsinhji Dabhi Thakor	Bharatiya Janata Party	633,368	193,879
4	Mahesana	65.78 ▼	Shardaben Patel	Bharatiya Janata Party	659,525	281,519
5	Sabarkantha	67.77 ▼	Dipsinh Rathod	Bharatiya Janata Party	701,984	268,987
6	Gandhinagar	66.08 ▲	Amit Shah	Bharatiya Janata Party	894,624	557,014
7	Ahmedabad East	61.76 ▲	Hasmukh Patel	Bharatiya Janata Party	749,834	434,330
8	Ahmedabad West	60.81 ▼	Kirit Solanki	Bharatiya Janata Party	641,622	321,546
9	Surendranagar	58.41 ▲	Mahendra Munjapara	Bharatiya Janata Party	631,844	277,437
10	Rajkot	63.49 ▼	Mohan Kundariya	Bharatiya Janata Party	758,645	368,407
11	Porbandar	57.21 ▲	Rameshbhai Dhaduk	Bharatiya Janata Party	563,881	229,823
12	Jamnagar	61.03 ▲	Poonamben Maadam	Bharatiya Janata Party	591,588	236,804
13	Junagadh	61.31 ▼	Rajesh Chudasama	Bharatiya Janata Party	547,952	150,185
14	Amreli	55.97 ▲	Naranbhai Kachhadia	Bharatiya Janata Party	529,035	201,431
15	Bhavnagar	59.05 ▲	Bharti Shiyal	Bharatiya Janata Party	661,273	329,519
16	Anand	67.04 ▲	Miteshbhai Patel	Bharatiya Janata Party	633,097	197,718
17	Kheda	61.04 ▲	Devusinh Chauhan	Bharatiya Janata Party	714,572	367,145
18	Panchmahal	62.23 ▲	Ratansinh Rathod	Bharatiya Janata Party	732,136	428,541
19	Dahod	66.57 ▲	Jasvantsinh Bhabhor	Bharatiya Janata Party	561,760	127,596
20	Vadodara	68.18 ▼	Ranjanben Bhatt	Bharatiya Janata Party	883,719	589,177
21	Chhota Udaipur	73.90 ▲	Gitaben Rathva	Bharatiya Janata Party	764,445	377,943
22	Bharuch	73.55 ▼	Mansukhbhai Vasava	Bharatiya Janata Party	637,795	334,214
23	Bardoli	73.89 ▼	Parbhubhai Vasava	Bharatiya Janata Party	742,273	215,447
24	Surat	64.58 ▲	Darshana Jardosh	Bharatiya Janata Party	795,651	548,230
25	Navsari	66.40 ▲	C. R. Patil	Bharatiya Janata Party	972,739	689,668
26	Valsad	75.48 ▲	Dr. K C Patel	Bharatiya Janata Party	771,980	353,797

== Post-election Union Council of Ministers from Gujarat ==
#	Name	Constituency	Designation	Department	From	To	Party
1	Amit Shah	Gandhinagar	Cabinet Minister	Minister of Home Affairs; Minister of Co-operation (from July 2021)	31 May 2019	9 June 2024	BJP
2	S. Jaishankar	Rajya Sabha (Gujarat)	Cabinet Minister	Minister of External Affairs	31 May 2019	9 June 2024	BJP
3	Mansukh Mandaviya	Rajya Sabha (Gujarat)	Cabinet Minister	Minister of Health and Family Welfare (from July 2021); Minister of Chemicals and Fertilizers (Cabinet from July 2021); MoS (I/C) for Ports, Shipping and Waterways (until July 2021)	31 May 2019	9 June 2024	BJP
4	Parshottam Rupala	Rajya Sabha (Gujarat)	Cabinet Minister	Minister of Fisheries, Animal Husbandry and Dairying (from July 2021); MoS for Agriculture and Farmers' Welfare (until July 2021)	31 May 2019	9 June 2024	BJP
5	Darshana Jardosh	Surat	MoS	Ministry of Railways; Ministry of Textiles	7 July 2021	9 June 2024	BJP
6	Devusinh Chauhan	Kheda	MoS	Ministry of Communications	7 July 2021	9 June 2024	BJP
7	Mahendra Munjapara	Surendranagar	MoS	Ministry of Women and Child Development; Ministry of AYUSH	7 July 2021	9 June 2024	BJP

== Assembly segments wise lead of parties ==
2019 Gujarat Lok Sabha Elections Assembly Wise Leads Map

Party	Assembly segments	Position in Assembly (as of 2022)
Bharatiya Janata Party	173	156
Indian National Congress	9	17
Others	–	9
Total	182	
