= Panchmahal Lok Sabha constituency =

Lok Sabha Constituency in Gujarat

Coordinates: 22.7°N 73.6°E

Panchmahal
- Lok Sabha constituency

Constituency details
- Country: India
- Region: Western India
- State: Gujarat
- Assembly constituencies: Thasra; Balasinor; Lunawada; Shehra; Morva Hadaf; Godhra; Kalol
- Established: 2008
- Total electors: 18,96,743 (2024)
- Reservation: None

Member of Parliament
- 18th Lok Sabha
- Incumbent Rajpalsinh Mahendrasinh Jadav
- Party: Bharatiya Janata Party
- Elected year: 2024

Panchmahal is one of the 26 Lok Sabha (lower house of Indian Parliament) constituencies in Gujarat, a state in western India. This constituency was created as a part of the implementation of delimitation of parliamentary constituencies in 2008. It first held elections in 2009 and its first member of parliament (MP) was Prabhatsinh Pratapsinh Chauhan of the Bharatiya Janata Party. As of the latest elections in 2024, Rajpalsinh Mahendrasinh Jadav represents this constituency.

== Assembly segments ==
As of 2014, Panchmahal Lok Sabha constituency comprises seven Vidhan Sabha (legislative assembly) segments. These are:

Constituency number	Name	Reserved for (SC/ST/None)	District	Party	2024 Lead
119	Thasra	None	Kheda	BJP	BJP
121	Balasinor	None	Mahisagar	BJP	BJP
122	Lunawada	None	Mahisagar	BJP	BJP
124	Shehra	None	Panchmahal	BJP	BJP
125	Morva Hadaf	ST	Panchmahal	BJP	BJP
126	Godhra	None	Panchmahal	BJP	BJP
127	Kalol	None	Panchmahal	BJP	BJP

== Members of Parliament ==
Year	Name	Party
Till 2008 : Constituency did not exist
2009	Prabhatsinh Pratapsinh Chauhan	Bharatiya Janata Party
2014	Prabhatsinh Pratapsinh Chauhan	Bharatiya Janata Party
2019	Ratansinh Rathod	Bharatiya Janata Party
2024	Rajpalsinh Mahendrasinh Jadav	Bharatiya Janata Party

== Election results ==
=== 2024 ===
2024 Indian general election: Panchmahal
Party	Candidate	Votes	%	±%
BJP	Rajpalsinh Mahendrasinh Jadav	794,579	70.22	▲2.66
INC	Gulabsinh Chauhan	2,85,237	25.21	▼2.81
NOTA	None of the above	20,103	1.78	▼0.08
IND	Hasmukhkumar Ganpatsinh Rathod	10,399	0.92	N/A
IND	Manojsinh Ranajitsinh Rathod	4,013	0.35	N/A
Majority		5,09,342	45.01	▲5.48
Turnout		11,32,935	59.68	▼2.55
BJP hold		Swing		

=== 2019 ===
2019 Indian general elections: Panchmahal
Party	Candidate	Votes	%	±%
BJP	Ratansinh Rathod	732,136	67.56	+13.11
INC	Khant Vechatbhai Kuberbhai	3,03,595	28.02	−8.07
NOTA	None of the above	20,133	1.86	−1.92
NCP	Virendra Parsottamdas Patel	9,826	0.91	+0.91
IND	Lalabhai Gadhvi	9,212	+0.85	+0.85
Margin of victory		4,28,541	39.53	+21.25
Turnout		10,85,718	62.23	+2.93
BJP hold		Swing		

=== General election 2014 ===
2014 Indian general elections: Panchmahal
Party	Candidate	Votes	%	±%
BJP	Prabhatsinh Pratapsinh Chauhan	508,274	54.45	+7.95
INC	Ramsinh Parmar	3,37,678	36.17	−9.98
BSP	Ramchandra Giri	15,956	1.71	−0.04
Independent	Vankar Manilal Bhanabhai	11,375	1.22	N/A
Independent	Mansuri Mukhatyar Mohammad	10,857	1.16	N/A
AAP	Piyushkumar Dilipbhai Parmar	6,935	0.74	N/A
Independent	Patel Pankajbhai Ravjibhai	5,426	0.58	N/A
Independent	Chavada Harishchandrasinh Prabhatsinh	3,751	0.40	N/A
Independent	S. N. Chavada	2,401	0.26	N/A
SP	Shaikh Kalim Abdullatif	1,993	0.21	N/A
Independent	Gora Shoeb Mohmadhanif	1,497	0.16	N/A
JD(U)	Shaikh Majitmiya Jivamiya	1,337	0.14	N/A
NOTA	None of the above	25,981	2.78	N/A
Margin of victory		1,70,596	18.28	+17.93
Turnout		9,35,016	59.30	+16.68
BJP hold		Swing		

=== General election 2009 ===
2009 Indian general elections: Panchmahal
Party	Candidate	Votes	%	±%
BJP	Prabhatsinh Pratapsinh Chauhan	282,079	46.50	N/A
INC	Shankersinh Vaghela	2,79,998	46.15	N/A
LJP	Kalim Shaikh	23,615	3.89	N/A
BSP	Barot Prakashkumar Maneklal	10,637	1.75	N/A
ABMSD	Mansuri Mukhtyar Mohammad	10,328	1.70	N/A
Margin of victory		2,081	0.35	N/A
Turnout		6,07,005	42.65	N/A
BJP win (new seat)				

== See also ==
- Godhra Lok Sabha constituency
- Kapadvanj Lok Sabha constituency
- Panchmahal District
- List of constituencies of the Lok Sabha
