= Voiceless retroflex plosive =

Consonantal sound represented by ⟨ʈ⟩ in IPA

ʈ
- IPA number: 105

Audio sample
- source · help

Encoding
- Entity (decimal): &#648;
- Unicode (hex): U+0288
- X-SAMPA: t`
- Braille: ⠲ (braille pattern dots-256) ⠞ (braille pattern dots-2345)
Image

A voiceless retroflex plosive or stop is a type of consonantal sound, used in some spoken languages. This consonant is found as a phoneme mostly (though not exclusively) in two areas: South Asia and Australia.

== Transcription ==
The symbol that represents this sound in the International Phonetic Alphabet is ⟨ʈ⟩. Like all the retroflex consonants, the IPA symbol is formed by adding a rightward-pointing hook extending from the bottom of "t" (the letter used for the equivalent alveolar consonant). In many fonts lowercase "t" already has a rightward-pointing hook, but ⟨ʈ⟩ is distinguished from ⟨t⟩ by extending the hook below the baseline.

== Features ==
Sagittal section of a voiceless retroflex plosive

Features of a voiceless retroflex stop:

- Its manner of articulation is occlusive, which means it is produced by obstructing airflow in the vocal tract. Since the consonant is also oral, with no nasal outlet, it is a plosive.
- Its place of articulation is retroflex, which prototypically means it is articulated subapical (with the tip of the tongue curled up), but more generally, it means that it is postalveolar without being palatalized. That is, besides the prototypical subapical articulation, the tongue can be apical (pointed) or, in some fricatives, laminal (flat).
- Its phonation is voiceless, which means it is produced without vibrations of the vocal cords. In some languages the vocal cords are actively separated, so it is always voiceless; in others the cords are lax, so that it may take on the voicing of adjacent sounds.
- It is an oral consonant, which means that air is not allowed to escape through the nose.
- It is a median consonant, which means it is produced by directing the airstream down the midline of the tongue, rather than to the sides.
- Its airstream mechanism is pulmonic, which means it is articulated by pushing air only with the intercostal muscles and abdominal muscles, as in most speech sounds.

== Occurrence ==
Language		Word	IPA	Translation	Notes
Bengali		টাকা	[ʈaka]	'taka'	Apical postalveolar; contrasts unaspirated and aspirated forms. See Bengali phonology
Brahui		سىٹ	[asiʈ]	'one'	
English	Indian dialects	time	[ʈaɪm]	'time'	Corresponds to alveolar /t/ in other dialects. See English phonology
English	General American	art	[ɑɻʈ]	'art'	Allophone of /t/ after [ɻ]
Gujarati		બટાકા	[bəʈaːka]	'potato'	Subapical; contrasts unaspirated and aspirated forms. See Gujarati phonology
Hindustani	Hindi	टोपी	[ʈoːpiː]	'hat'	Apical postalveolar
Hindustani	Urdu	ٹوپی	[ʈoːpiː]	'hat'	Apical postalveolar
Hmong		𖬅𖬰𖬡 / raus	[ʈàu]	'immerse in liquid'	Contrasts with aspirated form (written ⟨rh⟩).
Iwaidja		yirrwartbart	[jiɺwɑʈbɑʈ]	'taipan'	
Javanese		bathang	[baʈaŋ]	'cadaver'	
Kannada		ತಟ್ಟು	[t̪ʌʈːu]	'to tap'	Contrasts unaspirated and aspirated forms
Kashmiri		ٹوٗپؠ	[ʈuːpʲ]	'hat'	
Lo-Toga		dege	[ʈəɣə]	'we (incl.)'	Laminal retroflex.
Malayalam		പൂട്ട് / pūṭṭŭ	[puːʈʈɨ̆]	'lock'	Contrasts /t̪ t ʈ d̪ ɖ/. See Malayalam phonology
Marathi		बटाटा	[bəʈaːʈaː]	'potato'	Subapical; contrasts unaspirated and aspirated forms. See Marathi phonology
Mutsun		TiTkuSte	[ʈiʈkuʃtɛ]	'torn'	
Nepali		टोली	[ʈoli]	'team'	Apical postalveolar; contrasts unaspirated and aspirated forms. See Nepali phonology
Norwegian		kort	[kɔʈː]	'card'	See Norwegian phonology
Nunggubuyu		rdagowa	[ʈakowa]	'prawn'	
Odia		ଟଗର / ṭagara	[ʈɔgɔrɔ]	'crepe jasmine'	Apical postalveolar; contrasts unaspirated and aspirated forms.
Pashto		ټول	[ʈol]	'all'	
Punjabi	Gurmukhi	ਟੋਪੀ	[ʈoːpi]	'hat'	
Punjabi	Shahmukhi	ٹـوپی	[ʈoːpi]	'hat'	
Scottish Gaelic	Some Hebridean dialects	àrd	[aːʈ]	'high'	Corresponds to the sequence /rˠt/ in other dialects. See Scottish Gaelic phonology
Sicilian		latru	[ˈlaʈɽu]	'thief'	
Swedish		karta	[ˈkʰɑːʈa]	'map'	See Swedish phonology
Sylheti		ꠐꠥꠟ꠆ꠟꠤ	[ʈulli]	'skull'	contains tonal pronunciation. See Sylheti phonology
Tamil		எட்டு / يࣣڊُّ / eṭṭu	[eʈːɯ]	'eight'	Subapical. See Tamil phonology
Telugu		కొట్టు	[koʈːu]	'to hit or beat'	Contrasts unaspirated and aspirated forms
Torwali		ٹـىىےل	[ʈiɡel]	'words'	Contrasts aspirated and unaspirated forms.
Urdu		ساٹھ	[saːʈ]	'sixty'	
Vietnamese	Southern dialects	bạn trả	[ɓa˧˨ʔɳˀ ʈa˧˩˧]	'you pay'	May be somewhat affricated. See Vietnamese phonology
Welayta		[ʈaza]		'dew'	

== See also ==
- Index of phonetics articles

== Notes ==
Place →	Labial					Coronal										Dorsal					Laryngeal			
Manner ↓	Bilabial		Labiodental		Linguolabial		Dental		Alveolar		Postalveolar		Retroflex		(Alveolo-)palatal		Velar		Uvular		Pharyngeal/epiglottal		Glottal	
Nasal	m̥	m	ɱ̊	ɱ		n̼	n̪̊	n̪	n̥	n	n̠̊	n̠	ɳ̊	ɳ	ɲ̊	ɲ	ŋ̊	ŋ	ɴ̥	ɴ				
Plosive	p	b	p̪	b̪	t̼	d̼	t̪	d̪	t	d			ʈ	ɖ	c	ɟ	k	ɡ	q	ɢ	ʡ		ʔ	
Sibilant affricate							t̪s̪	d̪z̪	ts	dz	t̠ʃ	d̠ʒ	tʂ	dʐ	tɕ	dʑ								
Non-sibilant affricate	pɸ	bβ	p̪f	b̪v			t̪θ	d̪ð	tɹ̝̊	dɹ̝	t̠ɹ̠̊˔	d̠ɹ̠˔			cç	ɟʝ	kx	ɡɣ	qχ	ɢʁ	ʡʜ	ʡʢ	ʔh	
Sibilant fricative							s̪	z̪	s	z	ʃ	ʒ	ʂ	ʐ	ɕ	ʑ								
Non-sibilant fricative	ɸ	β	f	v	θ̼	ð̼	θ	ð	θ̠	ð̠	ɹ̠̊˔	ɹ̠˔	ɻ̊˔	ɻ˔	ç	ʝ	x	ɣ	χ	ʁ	ħ	ʕ	h	ɦ
Approximant		β̞		ʋ				ð̞		ɹ		ɹ̠		ɻ		j		ɰ						˷
Tap/flap		ⱱ̟		ⱱ					ɾ̥	ɾ			ɽ̊	ɽ						ɢ̆		ʡ̆		
Trill	ʙ̥	ʙ							r̥	r		r̠	ɽ̊r̥	ɽr					ʀ̥	ʀ	ʜ	ʢ		
Lateral affricate									tɬ	dɮ			tꞎ	d𝼅	c𝼆	ɟʎ̝	k𝼄	ɡʟ̝						
Lateral fricative							ɬ̪		ɬ	ɮ			ꞎ	𝼅	𝼆	ʎ̝	𝼄	ʟ̝						
Lateral approximant								l̪	l̥	l		l̠	ɭ̊	ɭ	ʎ̥	ʎ	ʟ̥	ʟ		ʟ̠				
Lateral tap/flap									ɺ̥	ɺ			𝼈̊	𝼈		ʎ̆		ʟ̆						

		BL	LD	D	A	PA	RF	P	V	U
Implosive	Voiced	ɓ			ɗ		ᶑ	ʄ	ɠ	ʛ
Implosive	Voiceless	ɓ̥			ɗ̥		ᶑ̊	ʄ̊	ɠ̊	ʛ̥
Ejective	Stop	pʼ			tʼ		ʈʼ	cʼ	kʼ	qʼ
Ejective	Affricate		p̪fʼ	t̪θʼ	tsʼ	t̠ʃʼ	tʂʼ	tɕʼ	kxʼ	qχʼ
Ejective	Fricative	ɸʼ	fʼ	θʼ	sʼ	ʃʼ	ʂʼ	ɕʼ	xʼ	χʼ
Ejective	Lateral affricate				tɬʼ			c𝼆ʼ	k𝼄ʼ	q𝼄ʼ
Ejective	Lateral fricative				ɬʼ					
Click (top: velar; bottom: uvular)	Tenuis	kʘ qʘ		kǀ qǀ	kǃ qǃ		k𝼊 q𝼊	kǂ qǂ		
Click (top: velar; bottom: uvular)	Voiced	ɡʘ ɢʘ		ɡǀ ɢǀ	ɡǃ ɢǃ		ɡ𝼊 ɢ𝼊	ɡǂ ɢǂ		
Click (top: velar; bottom: uvular)	Nasal	ŋʘ ɴʘ		ŋǀ ɴǀ	ŋǃ ɴǃ		ŋ𝼊 ɴ𝼊	ŋǂ ɴǂ	ʞ	
Click (top: velar; bottom: uvular)	Tenuis lateral				kǁ qǁ					
Click (top: velar; bottom: uvular)	Voiced lateral				ɡǁ ɢǁ					
Click (top: velar; bottom: uvular)	Nasal lateral				ŋǁ ɴǁ					
