= Rajpalsinh Jadav =

Indian politician

Member of Parliament, Lok Sabha
- Incumbent
- Assumed office 4 June 2024
- Preceded by: Ratansinh Rathod
- Constituency: Panchmahal Lok Sabha constituency

Personal details
- Born: 9 July 1982 (age 44) Raysingpura, Vadodara, Gujarat
- Party: Bharatiya Janata Party
- Spouse: Bhartiben Jadav (m.7 May 1998)
- Children: Pradhyumansinh, Jayrajsinh
- Parent(s): Mahendrasinh, Shardaben

Rajpalsinh Mahendrasinh Jadav is an Indian politician from Kalol, Gujarat. He was elected as a Member of Parliament from Panchmahal Lok Sabha constituency. He belongs to Bharatiya Janata Party.
