= Kakachiya =

- Village
- Country: India
- State: Gujarat
- District: Panch Mahals
- Subdistrict: Lunawada
- Time zone: UTC+05:30 (IST)

Kakachiya is a small village in the northeast of Lunawada taluka in Panch Mahals District, Gujarat, India 8 km away from Lunawada Town.

Kakachiya has different castes of people living there. The main cast is Patel. Many of them are teachers, as the entire Lunawada taluka is famous for teachers. The people of Kakachiya are also farmers.

Kakachiya is a village on the bank of three rivers, Panam, Veri, and Mahisagar. Mahisagar is one of the biggest rivers in Gujarat state. Also on the bank of Triveni Sangam, there is an ashram of Asaram.

It is a village between hills and rocks.
