= Godhra =

- City
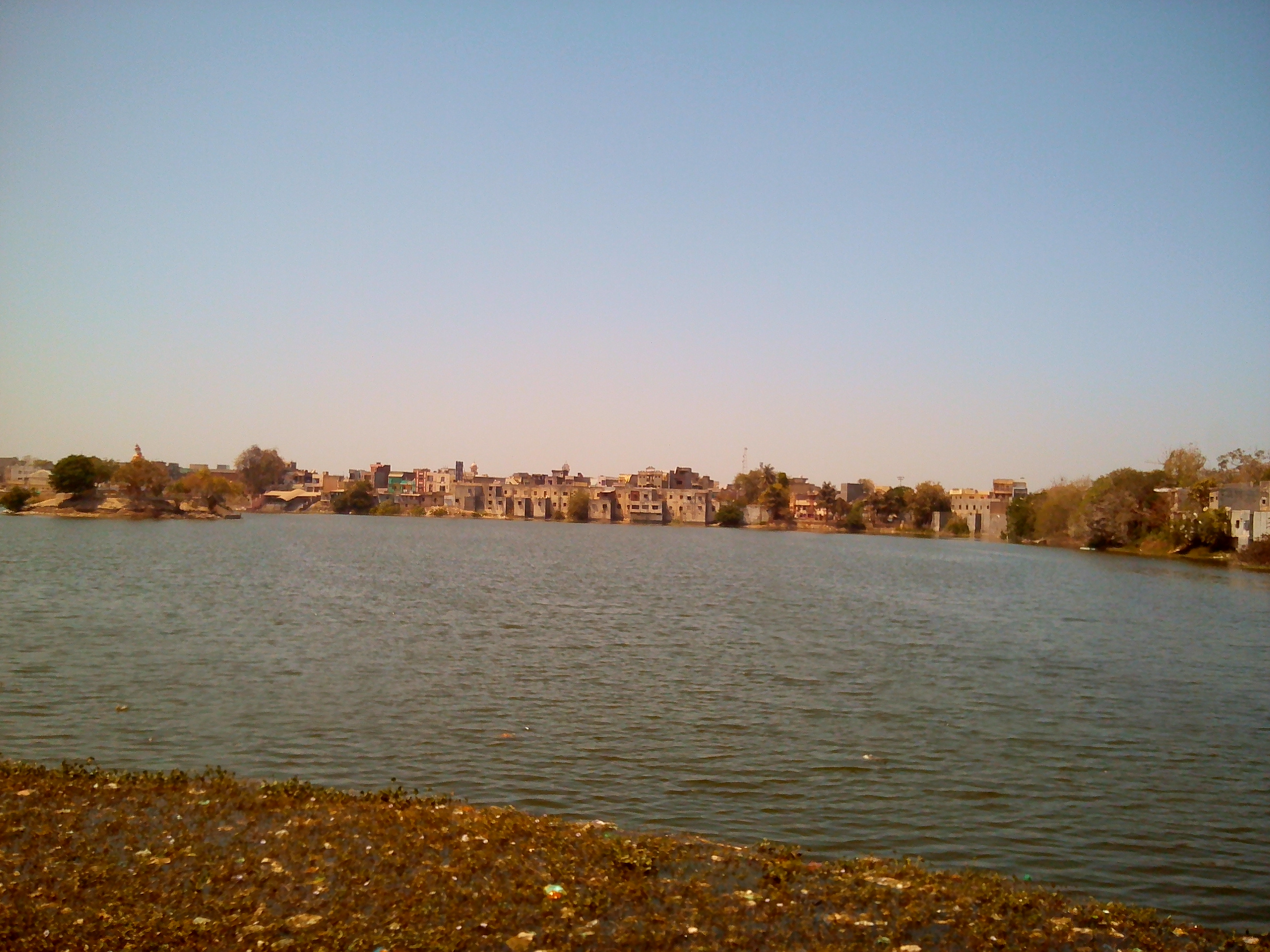
- Ramsagar Lake near Bus Stand, Godhra
- Nickname: Land of Cows
- Location within Gujarat Location within India
- Coordinates: 22°46′38″N 73°37′13″E
- Country: India
- State: Gujarat
- District: Panchmahal
- Named for: Cows

Area
  - Total: 20.16 km^{2} (7.78 sq mi)
- Elevation: 73 m (240 ft)

Population (2011)
  - Total: 143,644
  - Density: 7,125/km^{2} (18,450/sq mi)
- Demonym: Godharian

Languages
  - Spoken: Gujarati
  - Official: Gujarati, English
- Time zone: UTC+5:30 (IST)
- PIN: 389001
- Telephone code: 02672
- Vehicle registration: GJ-17
- Sex ratio: 935/1000 ♀/♂
- Literacy rate: 93.51 %
- Website: panchmahals.nic.in

Godhra (Godhrā) is a municipality in Panchmahal district in Indian state of Gujarat. It is the administrative capital of the Panchmahal district. Originally, the name came from gou which means "cow", and "dhara", which has two meanings depending on how the word is pronounced. 'Dharaa' means a feminine thing or person that "holds" something, and it usually means "land", and the other pronunciation is 'dhaaraa' which means "flow". However, the second pronunciation is not widely used nor is it usually associated with this word. Hence, 'Godhra or Godharaa' means the Land of the Cow.

Godhra is widely known in India and internationally for being the starting point of the 2002 Gujarat riots. Statewide religious riots between Hindus and Muslims began after the Godhra train burning incident near the Godhra railway station on 27 February 2002, where about 59 train passengers were burnt alive. It was in Godhra that Vallabhbhai Patel first met Gandhi in 1917 and was subsequently drawn into the Indian freedom struggle.

Godhra is a road and rail junction and a commercial centre for timber and agricultural produce. Industries include oilseed pressing, flour milling, and glass manufacture.

Godhra has a science, commerce, arts, law, ITI, engineering and medical colleges.

== Etymology ==
The name Godhrā is derived from earlier Godrahaka, referring to a pond or lake where cattle or buffalo came (perhaps to bathe).

As per local folklore, cows used to come here from Pavagadh for grazing.

Gujarati Historic Novel named Gujaratno Jay written by Zaverchand Meghani based on various Jain Prabandhas describes city as Godhpur(ગોધપુર).

== History ==
A bronze of Lord Rishabhanath from AD 975 was found at Akota, which mentions Gohadra kula, i.e., the school of Jain monks at Gohadra. The historical name of Godhra is "Godhrahk", which was established by Parmar king named Dhudhul Mandalik in A.D. 1415.

== Demographics ==
Religions in Godhra (2011)
Religion	Percent
Islam	51.23%
Hinduism	46.63%
Other or not stated	2.14%

As of the 2011 India census, Godhra had a population of 143,644. Males constitute 63.68% of the population and females 36.32%. Godhra has an average literacy rate of 93.51%, higher than the national average of 74.04%. Male literacy is 96.25%, and female literacy is 85.44%

As of the 2001 India census, Godhra had a population of 121,852. Males constitute 52% of the population and females 48%. Godhra has an average literacy rate of 73%, higher than the national average of 59.5%. Male literacy was 79.5%, and female literacy was 64.5%.

In 1901 the population was 20,915.

== Government and politics ==
Godhra city is governed by a municipality. The city is divided into 12 wards for the purpose of administration, and each ward is represented by 3 councillors. The city is also represented by an MP elected from the Panchmahal Lok Sabha constituency (erstwhile Godhra Lok sabha constituency), Ratansinh Rathore from the BJP, and an MLA elected from the Godhra Assembly constituency, CK Raulji.

I. I. Chundrigar, former Prime Minister of Pakistan was born in Godhra in 1897.

== Religious violence ==
Several incidents of communal violence have taken place in Godhra before and after the independence of India. Notable acts of violence include:

- During 1947–48, riots broke out in Godhra between the Ghanchi Muslim community and Sindhis who had emigrated from Pakistan after the Partition of India. About 3,500 properties were burnt down in the violence.
- Between October 1980 and September 1981, six major communal riots, arson, and pillaging took place between the majority Muslim community and Sindhi people in Godhra. Five members of a Sindhi family were burnt alive in the Muslim majority area of Signalfalia. As a result of the violence the town was placed under curfew for about 245 days during this period.
- In 1990, four Hindu teachers were killed by a Muslim mob in Vorwad area of Godhra.
- Godhra train burning – In 2002, a Muslim mob was accused of setting fire to the Sabarmati Express near Godhra railway station. 59 Hindu pilgrims who were returning from Ayodhya were killed in the fire. This incident is perceived as the trigger for the 2002 Gujarat riots.

== Transportation ==
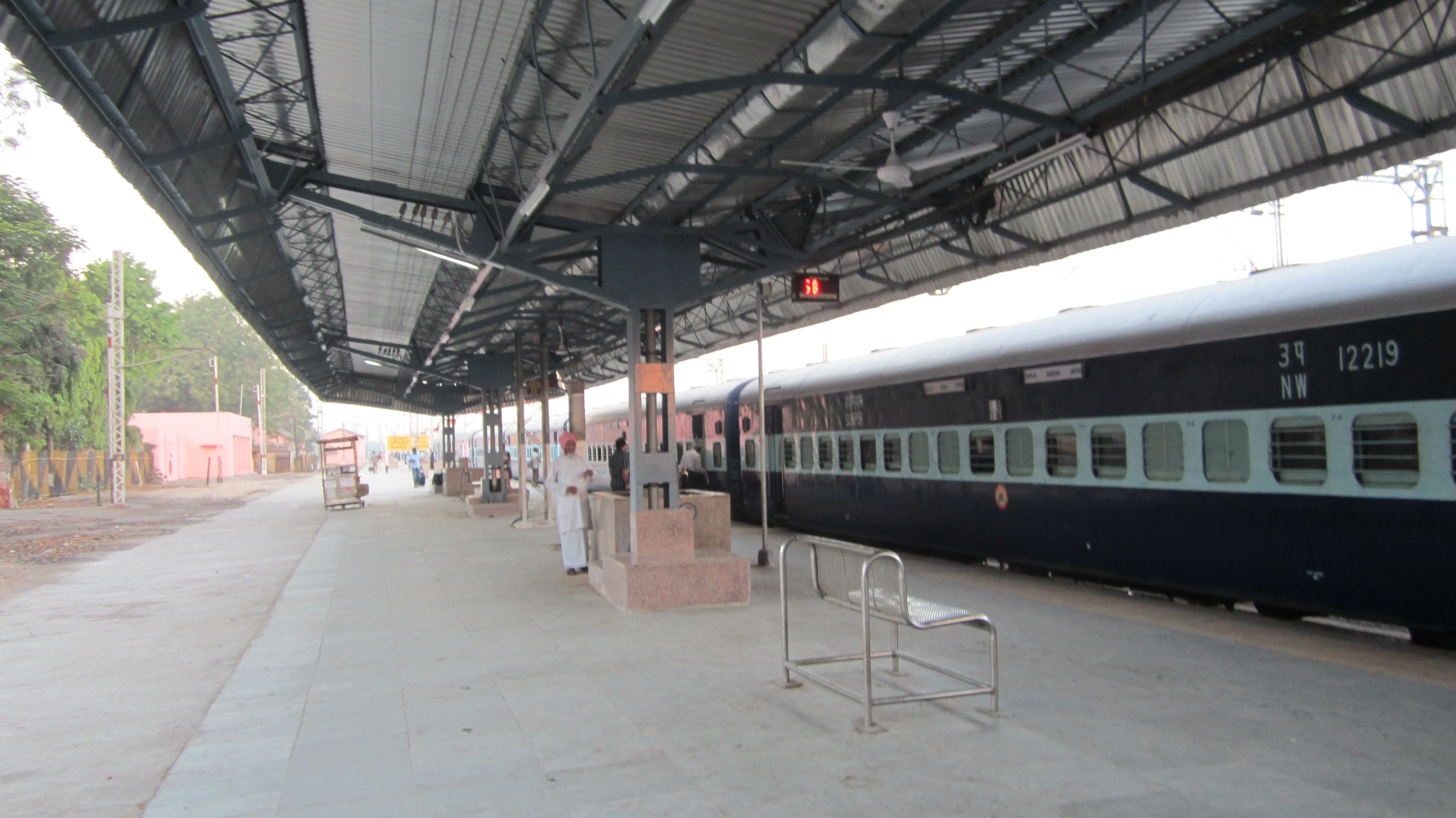
Godhra junction railway station

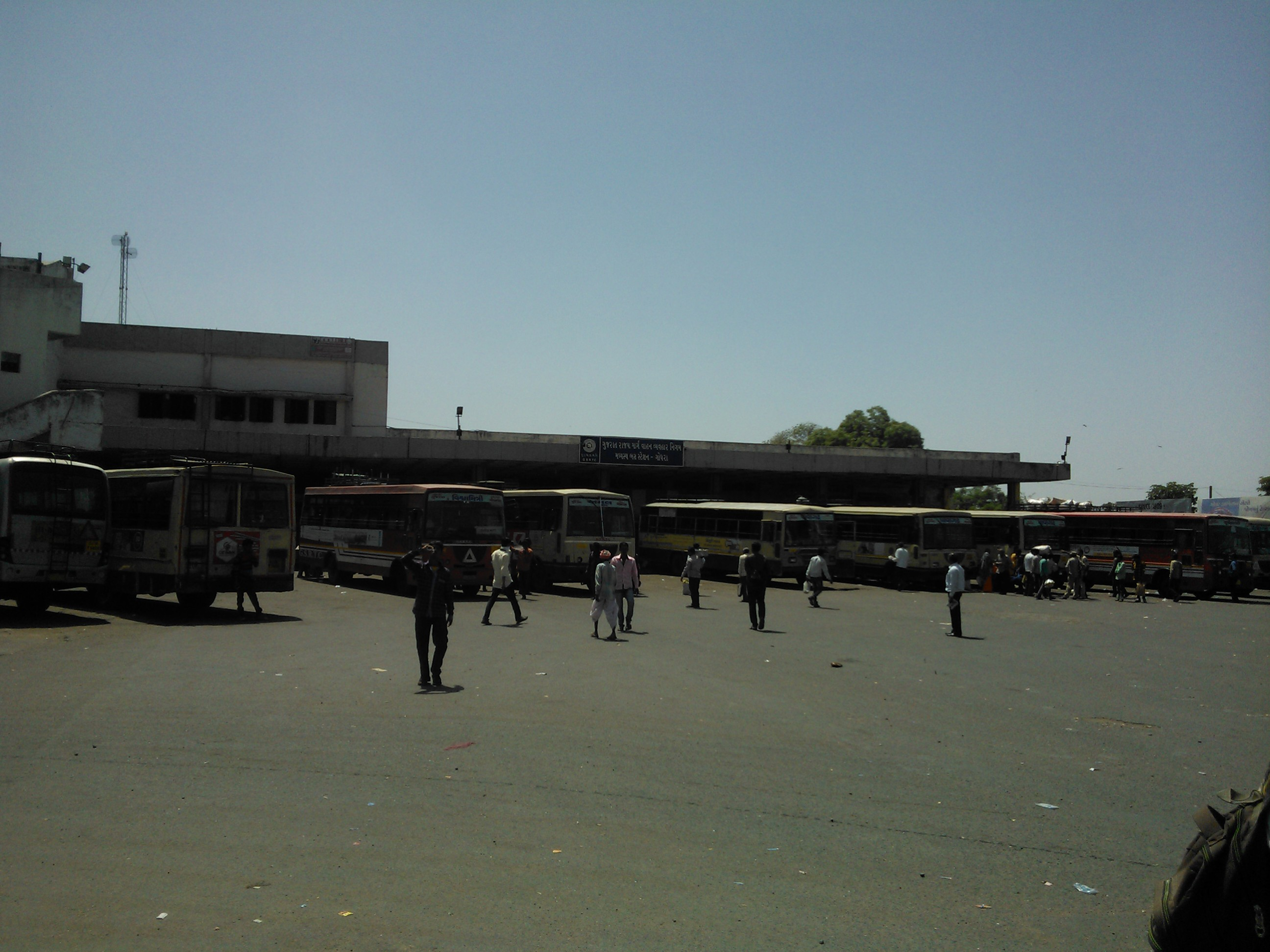
Godhra GSRTC Bus Station

Godhra is connected to all major towns of Gujarat by public transport service operated by GSRTC. And Godhra is a Railway Junction that connects Godhra with different parts of the state and nation.

India's biggest national highway Delhi-Mumbai expressway pass through godhra.

== Culture ==
=== Religious importance ===
- Sat Kaival Temple at Bagaidol village of Godhra is a temple of sat kaival sampraday.
- Godhra is one of the religious places in India which has four bethaks (temples) for Vaishnav Sampraday. There are two main seats of Lord Gokulnathji and one each for Lord Gusaiji and Lord Mahaprabhuji. Godhra is the only city in India that has all three seats (or bhaitaks) of the Mahaprabhuji, Gusianji, and Gokulnathji
- Godhra has three Jain temples. The main idol (or Mul Nayak) in the Jain Temple is of Shantinath. It also has a temple called the 'Trimandir', a non-sectarian temple founded by Dada Bhagwan in the Bhamaiya area (Ahmedabad Road).
- Godhra has BAPS and SMVS swaminarayan temple.
- Godhra has Sheikh Majhawar graveyard, which is believed to be one of the biggest in Asia.
- Makar Sakranti, Maha Shivratri, Holi, diwali, Eid al-Fitr, Baisakhi, Rakshabandhan, Krishna Janmashtami, Ganesh Chaturthi, Eid al-Adha, Muharram, Christmas, Dussehra, Easter are celebrated.

=== Landscape ===
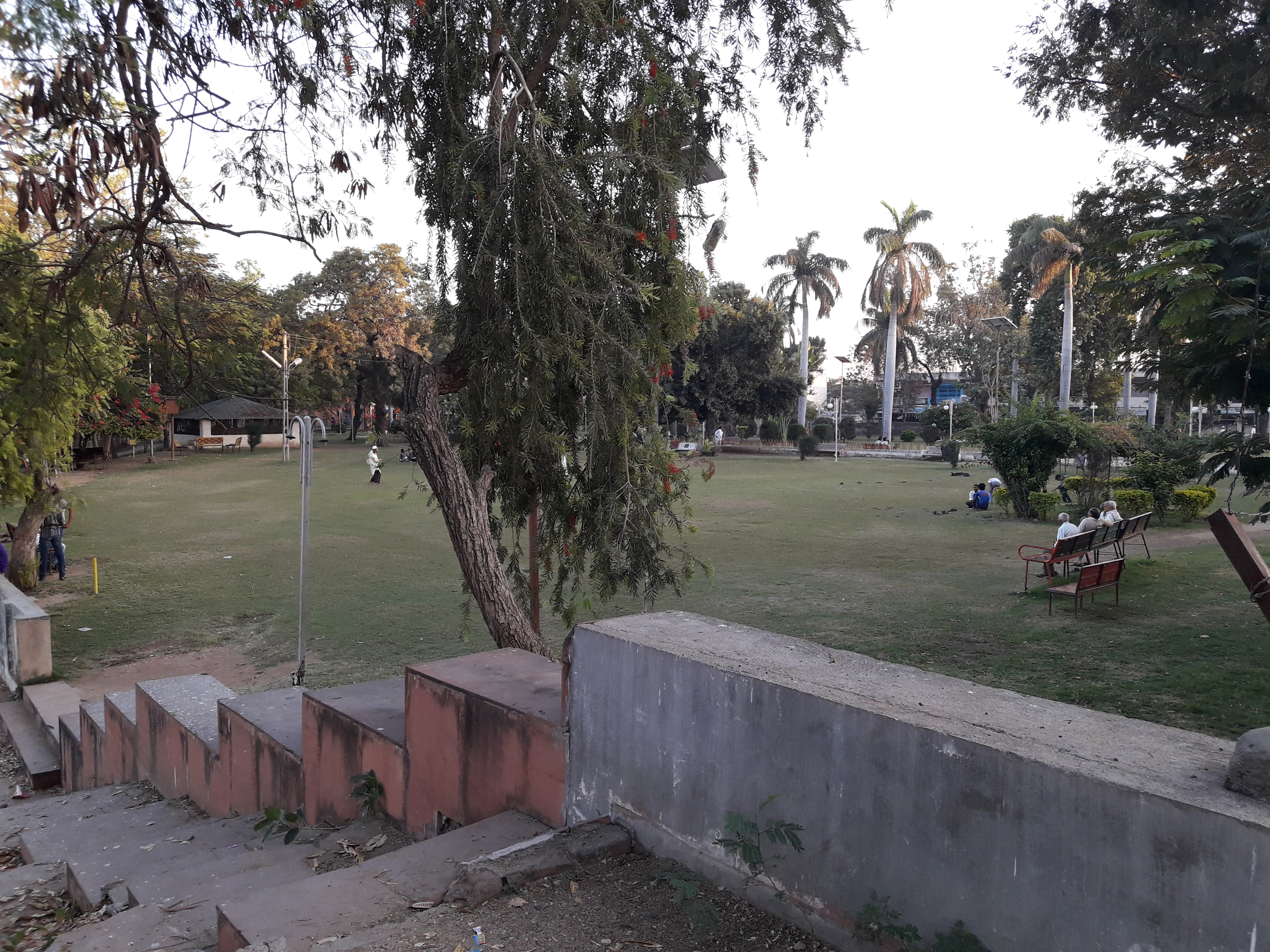
Nehru Park Godhra located near bus station

Geographic and manmade features in the area include the Mesri River, Ramsagar Lake, Voharwad Masjid Tower, Polan Bazar, Methodist Church, Naheru Garden and, in the far east, Kanelav Lake.
