= Shehra Assembly constituency =

Legislative Assembly constituency in Gujarat State, India

Coordinates: 22.95°N 73.63°E

Shehra
- Constituency No. 124 for the Gujarat Legislative Assembly

Constituency details
- Country: India
- Region: Western India
- State: Gujarat
- District: Panchmahal
- Lok Sabha constituency: Panchmahal
- Total electors: 261,060
- Reservation: None

Member of Legislative Assembly
- 15th Gujarat Legislative Assembly
- Incumbent Ahir(Bharvad) Jethabhai Ghelabhai
- Party: Bharatiya Janata Party
- Elected year: 2022

Shehra is one of the 182 Legislative Assembly constituencies of Gujarat state in India. It is part of Panchmahal district.

== List of segments ==
This assembly seat represents the following segments,

1. Shehra Taluka
2. Lunawada Taluka (Part) Villages – Kel, Dezar, Vaghoi, Chuladiya, Jetharibor, Gugaliya, Simlet
3. Godhra Taluka (Part) Villages – Nadisar, Khajuri, Odidra, Jaliya, Dhanitra, Rinchhrota, Motal, Karsana, Velvad, Ichhapaginu Muvadu, Ratanpur (Kantdi), Kabirpur, Kabariya, Juni Dhari, Timba, Gotavipura, Pipaliya (Dhari), Moryo, Kankanpur, Moti Kantdi, Gothada

== Member of Legislative Assembly ==
Year	Member	Party
1998	Jethabhai Ahir	Samajwadi Party
2002	Jethabhai Ahir	Bharatiya Janata Party
2007	Jethabhai Ahir	Bharatiya Janata Party
2012	Jethabhai Ahir	Bharatiya Janata Party
2017	Jethabhai Ahir	Bharatiya Janata Party
2022	Jethabhai Ahir	Bharatiya Janata Party

== Election results ==
=== 2022 ===
Gujarat Assembly election, 2022: Shehra Assembly constituency
Party	Candidate	Votes	%	±%
BJP	Ahir (Bharvad) Jethabhai Ghelabhai	1,07,775	59.45	
INC	Khatubhai Gulabbhai Pagi	60494	33.37	
AAP	Takhatsinh Ravsinh Solanki	6461	3.56	
NOTA	None of the above	4708	2.6	
Majority		47,281	26.08	
Turnout				
Registered electors		257,669		
BJP hold		Swing		

=== 2017 ===
Gujarat Legislative Assembly Election, 2017: Shehra
Party	Candidate	Votes	%	±%
BJP	Jethabhai Ahir	100,383	59.55	+10.05
INC	Dushyantsinh Chauhan	59,314	35.19	+4.29
SS	Lalabhai Gadhvi	2,268	1.35	New
Majority		41,069	24.36	+5.77
Turnout		1,68,559	72.22	−2.63
BJP hold		Swing		

=== 2012 ===
Gujarat Assembly Election, 2012
Party	Candidate	Votes	%	±%
BJP	Jethabhai Ahir	76,468	49.54	−6.44
INC	Takhatsinh Solanki	47,743	30.93	−8.92
GPP	Rangitbhai Pagi	12,562	8.14	New
LJP	Bhupatsinh Solanki	9,345	6.05	New
Majority			18.61	
Turnout		1,54,365		
BJP hold		Swing		

=== 2007 ===
Gujarat Assembly Election, 2007
Party	Candidate	Votes	%	±%
BJP	Jethabhai Ahir	64,055	55.98	−14.81
INC	Takhatsinh Solanki	45,602	39.85	+16.22
BSP	Sunil Brahmabhatt	4773	4.17	New
Majority			16.13	
Turnout		1,14,430		
BJP hold		Swing		

=== 2002 ===
Gujarat Assembly Election, 2002
Party	Candidate	Votes	%	±%
BJP	Jethabhai Ahir	85,668	70.79	
INC	Chhatrasinh Chauhan	28,604	23.63	
Majority		57,064	47.16	
Turnout		1,21,024	67.40	
BJP hold		Swing		

== See also ==
- List of constituencies of Gujarat Legislative Assembly
- Gujarat Legislative Assembly
- Panchmahal district
