= Fatesinh Chauhan =

Indian politician

Fatesinh Chauhan (born 1963) is an Indian politician from Gujarat. He is a member of the Gujarat Legislative Assembly from Kalol Assembly constituency in Panchmahal district. He won the 2022 Gujarat Legislative Assembly election representing the Bharatiya Janata Party.

== Early life and education ==
Chauhan is from Kalol, Panchmahal district, Gujarat. He is the son of Vakhatsinh Chauhan. He studied Class 10 at Nutan High School, Gundi, Ghoghamba and passed the examination in 1980. Later, he discontinued his studies.

== Career ==
Chauhan won from Kalol, Panchmahal Assembly constituency representing the Bharatiya Janata Party in the 2022 Gujarat Legislative Assembly election. He polled 141,686 votes and defeated his nearest rival, Prabhatsinh Chauhan of the Indian National Congress, by a margin of 115,679 votes.
