= Dalukhadia =

Dalukhadia (or Dalukhadiya) is a small village in Panchmahal district, Gujarat, India. It has a population of around 1000 people of all castes.

The main castes are Patel, Vankar and Shkatriya. Patel is the dominating caste, consisting of around 40 houses.

Most of the people work as teachers; however, a few are abroad or in business. Many of the people from the village are farmers.

People mainly follow the Swaminarayan religion and there are three temples (to worship Shiva, Mataji and Bhathiji Maharaj).

The village has one primary school teaching grades one to four, and a Panchayat Bhavan.

There is one lake, which almost stays dry in summer and winter.

Neighbouring villages are Pavapur, Nana Sonela, Nava Karva and Lunawada.
