= Jethabhai Ahir =

Indian politician

Deputy Speaker of Gujarat Legislative Assembly
- In office 27 September 2021 – 16 February 2026
- Speaker: Shankar Chaudhary
- Succeeded by: Purnesh Modi
- Chief Minister: Bhupendra Patel

Member of the Gujarat Legislative Assembly
- Incumbent
- Assumed office 1998
- Constituency: Shehra

Personal details
- Party: Bharatiya Janata Party

Jethabhai Bharwad (born 1 June 1950) is an Indian politician and an MLA from Shehra. He was born in Aniyad and currently lives in Khodiyarna Muwada, Aniyad, Shahera, Panchmahal, Gujarat. Nowadays, he is associated with the Bharatiya Janata Party (BJP). He ran from Shehra constituency, in the Gujarat assembly elections in 2017 and he won the election by 100,383 votes. In the 2012 Gujarat legislative assembly elections, Jethabhai Bharwad won from this constituency with a majority of votes 28,725 over Takhtsinh Solanki, who was contesting for the Indian National Congress.

== Education ==
He is a B.A. graduate from Gujarat University in the year 2005 and completed first year in LLB and is into Farmer and Livestock Breeding.
