= C.K Raulji =

Indian Politician

Minister of Gujarat State
- In office 1995–1998
- Constituency: Godhara

Member of the Gujarat Legislative Assembly
- Incumbent
- Assumed office 1990–1991, 1991–1995, 1995–1998, 2007–2012, 2012–2017
- Constituency: Godhara (Vidhan Sabha constituency)
- Incumbent
- Assumed office 2017

Personal details
- Party: Bharatiya Janata Party
- Occupation: Politician
- Website: https://www.ckraulji.com

C.K. Raulji is an Indian politician from the state of Gujarat. He is a two term member of the Gujarat Legislative Assembly.

== Career ==
Raulji is a member of the Bharatiya Janata Party (BJP).

He is a second-term member of the Gujarat Legislative Assembly. He represents the Godhara (Vidhan Sabha constituency), having been elected from there in 2012 and 2017. He joined Bharatiya Janata Party from Indian National Congress in October 2017.

CK Raulji was a member of the panel which reviewed the application for commutation filed by the convicts sentenced for gang rape and murder in the Bilkis Bano case. The panel recommended acceptance of the plea for commutation after the convicts had served fourteen years in prison. The convicts were released after 14 years in prison due to this panel's recommendation.

== Personal life ==
Raulji is married to Smt. Jaynaben Raulji. The couple have two children.

On 26 September 2017, a leopard was seen in the vicinity of Raulji's residence, and was captured three days later.

On, 19 August 2022, Raulji had controversially described the conduct of the 11 convicts in the Bilkis Bano case in jail as good. He said, “I do not know if they have committed the crime or not.”
