= Babu Suthar =

Gujarati writer and linguist from India

- Born: Panchmahal, Gujarat, India
- Occupations: writer, poet, critic, linguist
- Writing career
- Language: Gujarati
- Babu Suthar's voice intro

Babu Kohyabhai Suthar (pronounced [ba.bu su.tʰar]) is a Gujarati writer, linguist, journalist and academic from United States. Born and educated in India and later in the US, he is a lecturer in South Asia Studies at the University of Pennsylvania since 2003, at the time the only full-time instructor in this language in North America at the university level and is still currently there.

As a linguist, he is primarily interested in South Asian Linguistics and Typological Linguistics and has completed PhD on Agreement in Gujarati at the University of Pennsylvania in 2005 after coming from Maharaja Sayajirao University of Baroda, under Harold F. Schiffman. He had stint as journalist with the Gujarati newspaper Sandesh prior to taking up full-time academic pursuits.

He has written on linguistic philosophy as well as on literary theories in Gujarati, including a recently published co-authored piece on Gujarati language in Indo-Aryan Languages (RoutledgeCurzon, 2003). With his roots in Panchamahals district of Gujarat he has done several studies on the post-modern nuances of Gujarati idiom at his home territory.

He has also prepared extensive language materials: three textbooks, one learner's dictionary as well as several other materials for teaching Gujarati, including Gujarati thematic vocabulary, pedagogic grammar and Parts of Speech.

Suthar has published four experimental novels called Kachando ane Darpan, Shrimad Kagadapachchisi, Vakyakatha and Valgad, and the fifth, Nidraviyoga, is in press.

He has a published poem collection Gurujaapa, while a second Sapphera is in press. His short stories Dhuliyo and Lulo have been translated in English. He has also written a long fairy tale for children, Ek Hato Chhokaro, commissioned by the Ministry of Culture in India.

He was an editor of Sandhi, a Gujarati quarterly.

== See also ==
- List of Gujarati-language writers
