= Vejalpur =

- Census Town
- Location in Gujarat, India Vejalpur (India)
- Coordinates: 23.006145°N 72.516488°E
- Country: India
- State: Gujarat
- District: Ahmedabad
- Founder: Vejalji Thakor
- Elevation: 133 m (436 ft)

Population (2001)
  - Total: 113,304

Languages
  - Official: Gujarati, Hindi
- Time zone: UTC+5:30 (IST)
- Vehicle registration: GJ
- Website: gujaratindia.com

Vejalpur is a Census Town in the New West Zone of the metropolitan city of Ahmedabad in the Indian state of Gujarat.

== Geography ==
Vejalpur (Gujarat) is geographically located at latitude (23.006145 degrees) 23°00'22.1" North of the Equator and longitude (72.516488 degrees) 72°30'59.4" East of the Prime Meridian on the Map of the world.

== Demographics ==
As of 2001 India census, Vejalpur had a population of 113,304. Males constitute 52% of the population and females 48%. Vejalpur has an average literacy rate of 80%, higher than the national average of 59.5%: male literacy is 84%, and female literacy is 77%. In Vejalpur, 11% of the population is under 6 years of age.

== Prominent Political Names from Vejalpur ==
- Amit Thaker - BJP MLA
- Raju Thakor - AMC Dandak
- Kalpesh Patel - Senior Leader, Indian National Congress (INC)
- Mahesh Ramabhai Thakor, President and Youth Congress Leader(IYC)
- Paresh Waghela(Lawyer) - Senior Congress (INC) leader and an Elected Member of Bar Council Of Gujarat.
- Mihir Shah - Indian National Congress

Vejalpur is declared as independent assembly constituency. Vejalpur, Jodhpur, Maktampura and Sarkhej are the Four Ahmedabad Municipal Corporation ward of vejalpur assembly. Vejalpur One Of the Assembly Of Gandhinagar Legislative Assembly
