= Panchmahal district =

- District of Gujarat
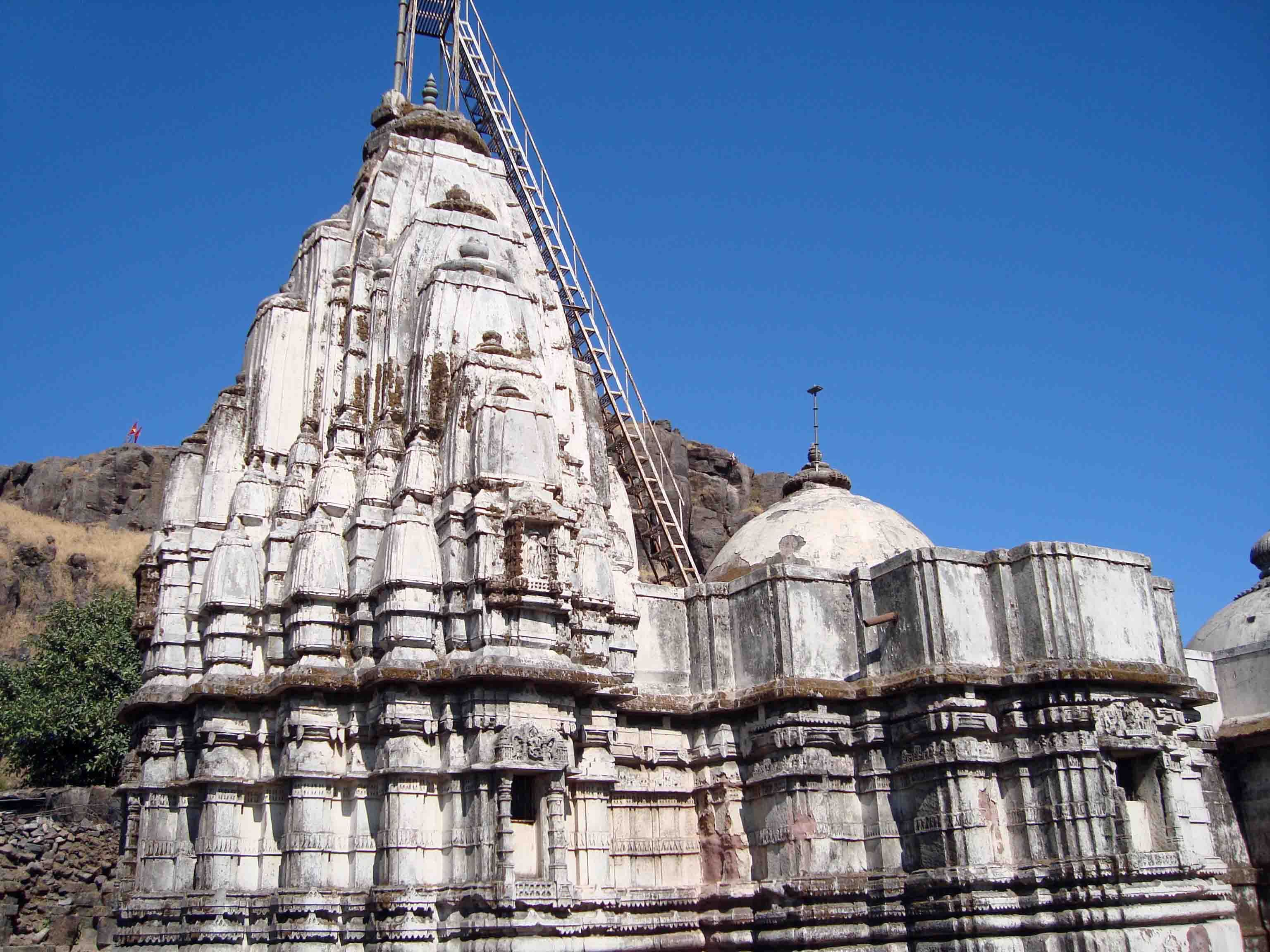
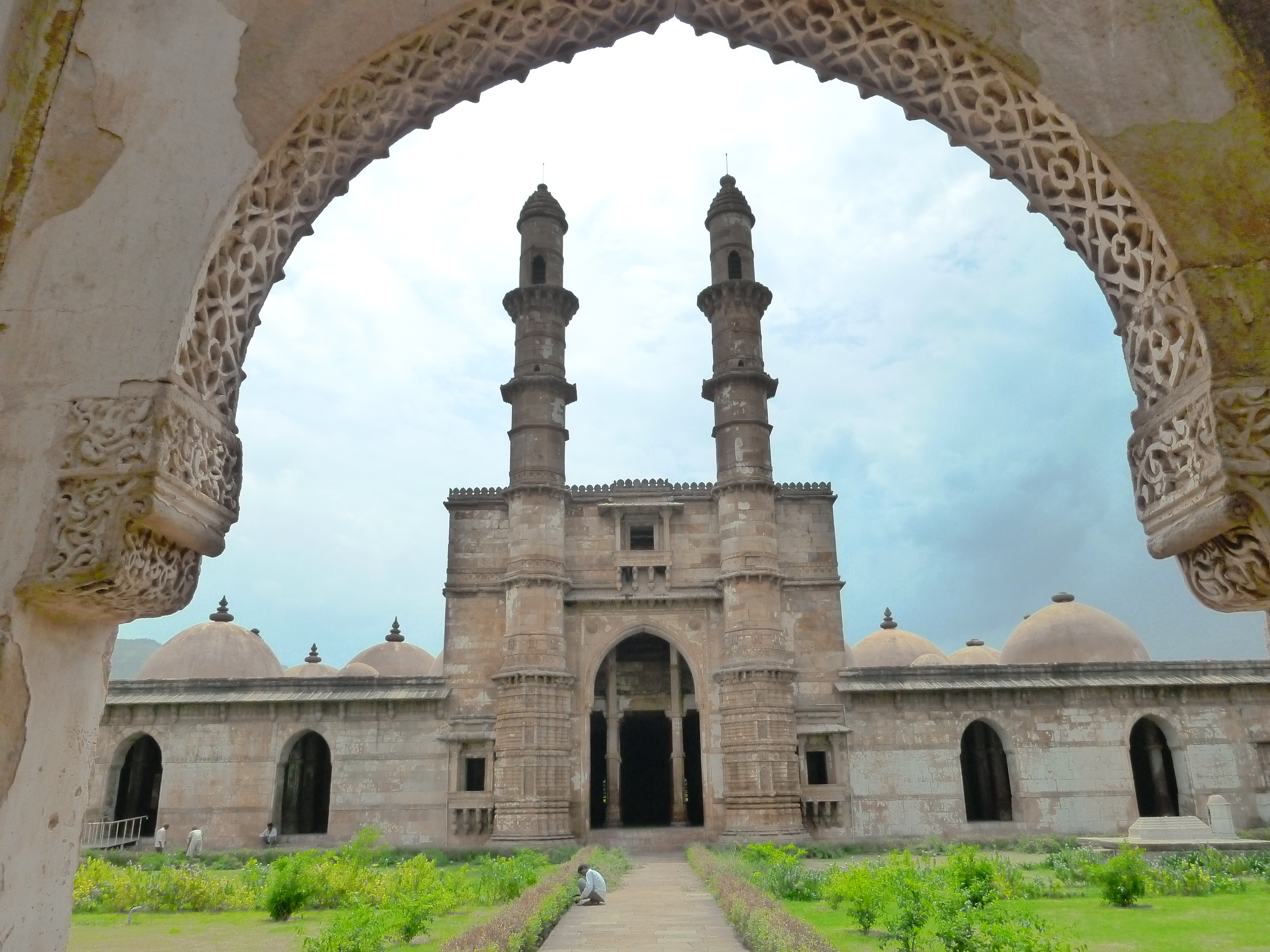
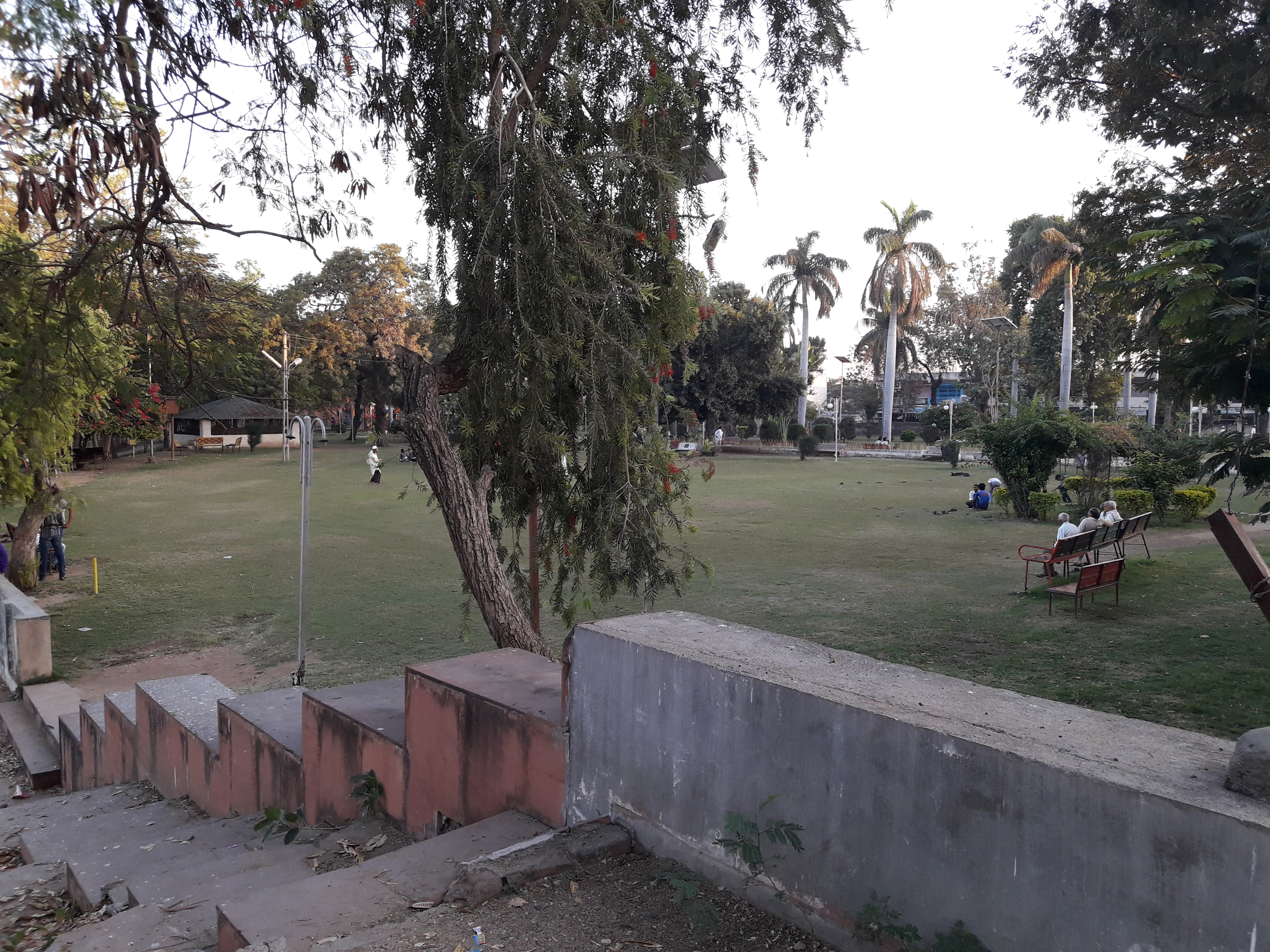
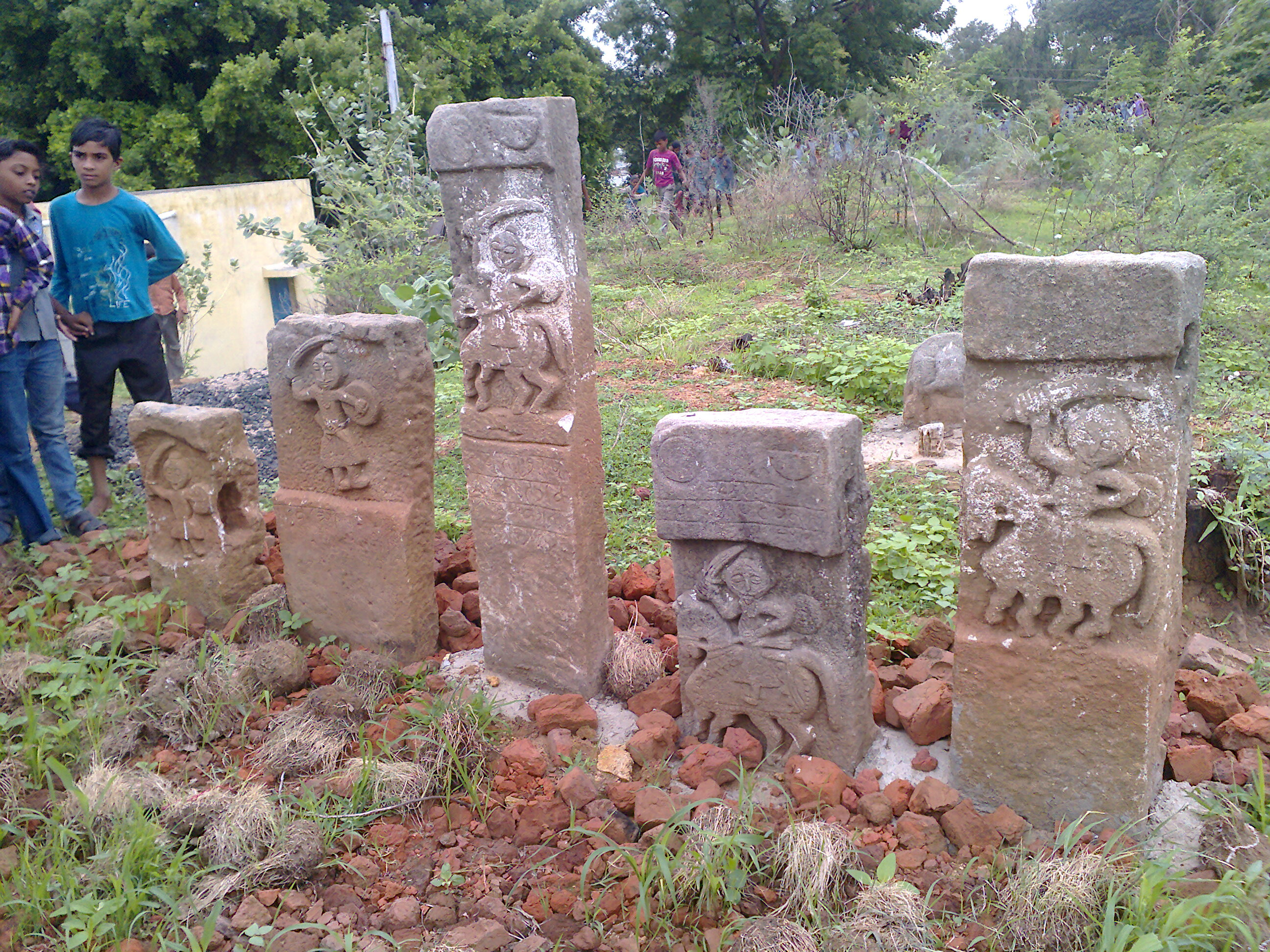
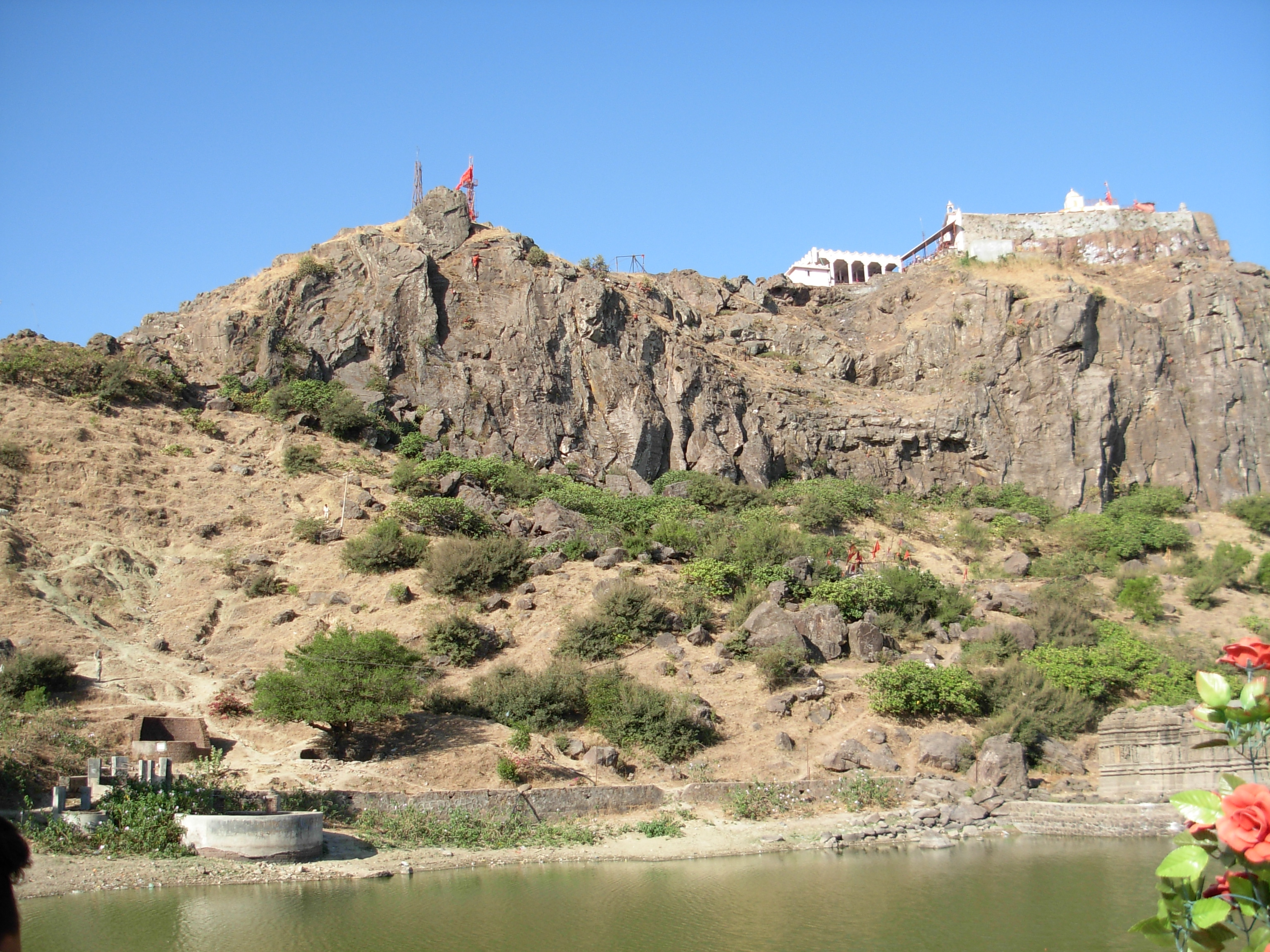
- Clockwise from top-left: Suparshvanatha Temple, Jamia Masjid in Champaner, Hero stones in Tarkhanda, Dudhiyu Talav in Pavagadh Hill, Nehru Park in Godhra

- Location of the district in Gujarat
- Coordinates: 22°45′N 73°36′E
- Country: India
- State: Gujarat
- Headquarters: Godhra

Area
  - Total: 5,219 km^{2} (2,015 sq mi)

Population (2011)
  - Total: 1,642,268
  - Density: 314.7/km^{2} (815.0/sq mi)

Languages
  - Official: Gujarati, Hindi
- Time zone: UTC+5:30 (IST)
- Vehicle registration: GJ 17
- Website: panchmahals.nic.in

Panchmahal district, is a district in the eastern portion of Gujarat State western India. Panch-mahal means "five tehsils/talukas" (5 sub-divisions), and refers to the five sub-divisions that were transferred by the Maharaja Jivajirao Scindia of Gwalior State to the British: Godhra, Dahod, Halol, Kalol and Jhalod, Devgadh Baria. The district had a population of 2,390,776 of which 12.51% were urban as of 2001.

The district is located on the eastern end of the state. It is bordered by Dahod district to the north-east & east, Vadodara district to the southwest and Chhota Udaipur district to southeast, Kheda district to the west and Mahisagar district to the north.

== Name ==
Panch-mahal is a Hindustani or Gujarati word derived from Panch ("five") and Mahal which adopted from its original usage in Arabic for a place or type of building, later adopted in Hindi to refer to a province, district or its division, an estate etc. The district was originally called the Pavagadh Panch Mahals, because it consisted of five mahals administered from Pavagadh: Godhra, Kalol, Halol, Dahod, and Jhalod.

== History ==
The history of the Panchmahals district revolves around the city of Champaner and the nearby Pavagadh Hill. Champaner was established in the 7th century (647) in the territory of King Vanraj Chavda of Chavda dynasty. In the 13th century, the Delhi Sultanate under Alauddin Khalji took the city from the Chauhan rulers. Their rule continued until 1484 when Sultan Mahmud Begada of Gujarat captured the city. Thereafter Godhra became the center of the district under the Mughal Empire (1575 to 1727). The author of the Mirat-i Sikandari, writing in 1611, spoke high praise of the mangoes of the region, calling them the best in the kingdom, and said that sandalwood grew abundantly here and was used to build houses. Throughout the 1600s, the forests around Dahod and Champaner were used as hunting grounds for wild elephants.

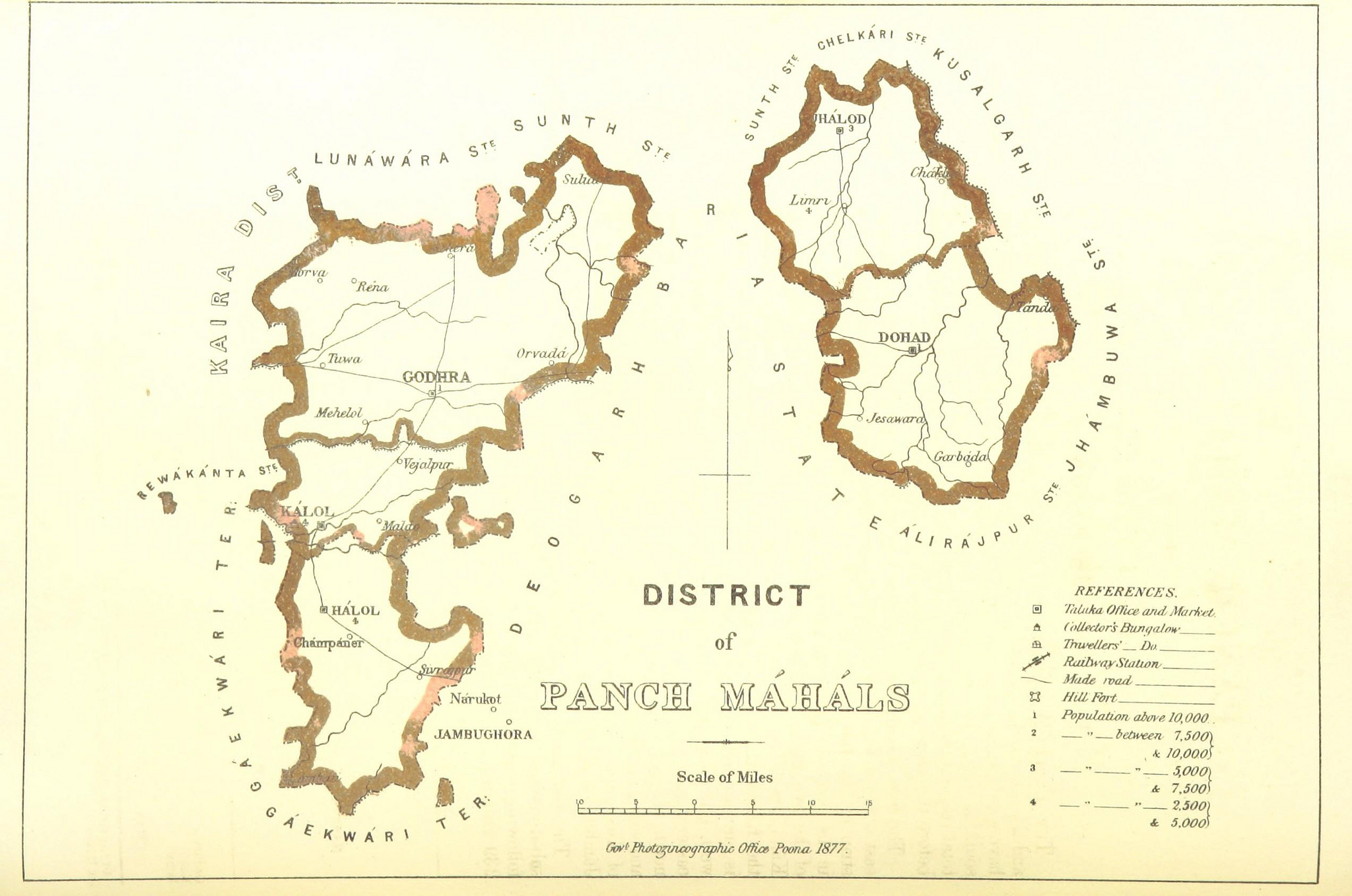
Panch Mahals district, 1896

In October 1997, Dahod was split off as a new district with headquarters at the town of the same name.

The district is the site of Godhra, where the 2002 Gujarat riots were incited from.

== Economy ==
In 2006 the Ministry of Panchayati Raj named Panchmahal one of the country's 250 most backward districts (out of a total of 640). It is one of the six districts in Gujarat currently receiving funds from the Backward Regions Grant Fund Programme (BRGF).

The Panchmahal district is rich in forestry resources. In 2011, 23.26% of the total land area of the Panchmahal district was covered by forest. 97.80% of the forested area in Panchmahal was classified as reserved forest. Common trees in the forests of Panchmahal include mahuda, teak, and khakhra. Since 1989, the Forest Department has planted new trees throughout the district in order to increase the total forest area and counter deforestation.

Panchmahal district is the largest producer of quartz, trap, and quartzite in Gujarat, for use as road material. Manganese ore is also commercially mined in Panchmahal; quartz and manganese are the two largest mineral resources in the district, with total production of the two combined exceeding 400,000 tonnes in 2011. Panchmahal also has the most extensive graphite deposits in the state of Gujarat, and there are granite quarries in several parts of the district.

Agriculture is the main source of employment for the people of Panchmahal: 75.88% of the district's total working population was employed in agriculture in 2011, compared with 49.61% for the state as a whole. The main crops are rice, maize, tur, gram, castor, cotton, and wheat. Of these, the most widely cultivated are rice, maize, wheat, castor, and tur, in that order, owing to their relative profitability and ease of cultivation. In the hillier eastern parts of the district, gram is grown as a second crop, after rice and maize are harvested; its widespread cultivation is particularly characteristic of Panchmahal.

The main livestock animals in Panchmahal are buffaloes, particularly of the Mehsani and Surati breeds, cattle, and goats. Many animals are kept for dairy products, and dairy farms have traditionally been an important source of employment for many rural families. Additionally, around 3,000 people were employed in fishing in the Panchmahal district in 2011, almost entirely in ponds and artificial tanks due to the lack of major year-round rivers in the area.

Industry is concentrated in Godhra, Kalol, and Halol. The largest manufacturing categories in the district in 2011 included Rubber and Plastic Products, Basic Metal Industries, Machinery and Parts Except Electrical, and Mining and Quarrying.

== Demographics ==
Historical population
Year	Pop.	±% p.a.
1901	281,876	—
1911	364,424	+2.60%
1921	423,992	+1.53%
1931	504,580	+1.76%
1941	580,563	+1.41%
1951	694,054	+1.80%
1961	888,549	+2.50%
1971	1,106,441	+2.22%
1981	1,375,101	+2.20%
1991	1,682,333	+2.04%
2001	2,025,277	+1.87%
2011	2,390,776	+1.67%

According to the 2011 census, Panchmahal district has a population of 2,390,776, roughly equal to the nation of Latvia or the US state of New Mexico. This gives it a ranking of 187th in India (out of a total of 640). The district has a population density of 458 inhabitants per square kilometre (1,190/sq mi) . Its population growth rate over the decade 2001–2011 was 17.92%. PanchMahal has a sex ratio of 945 females for every 1000 males, and a literacy rate of 72.32%.

The divided district has a population of 1,642,268, of which 278,408 (16.95%) lived in urban areas. The divided district had a sex ratio of 948 females per 1000 males. Scheduled Castes and Scheduled Tribes make up 66,529 (4.05%) and 374,413 (22.80%) of the population respectively.

Religions in Panchmahal district (2011)
Religion	Percent
Hinduism	91.80%
Islam	7.63%
Other or not stated	0.57%

Hindus are 1,507,636 while Muslims are 125,235.

Languages of Panchmahal district (2011)
1. Gujarati (95.4%)
2. Urdu (2.28%)
3. Hindi (1.48%)
4. Others (0.80%)

At the time of the 2011 Census of India, 95.44% of the population in the district spoke Gujarati, 2.28% Urdu and 1.48% Hindi as their first language.

== Politics ==
District	No.	Constituency	Name	Party	Remarks
Panchmahal	124	Shehra	Jethabhai Ahir	Deputy Speaker	
Panchmahal	125	Morva Hadaf (ST)	Nimishaben Suthar		
Panchmahal	126	Godhra	C. K. Raulji		
Panchmahal	127	Kalol (Panchmahal)	Fatehsinh Chauhan		
Panchmahal	128	Halol	Jaydrathsinh Parmar		

== Villages ==
- Dalukhadia
- Kakachiya

== External links and Sources ==
- Official website
- Geographic data related to Panchmahal district at OpenStreetMap
