= Ratansinh Rathod =

Indian politician

Ratansinh Magansinh Rathod

Member of the India Parliament for Panchmahal
- In office 23 May 2019 – 4 June 2024
- Preceded by: Prabhatsinh Pratapsinh Chauhan
- Succeeded by: Rajpalsinh Mahendrasinh Jadav
- Constituency: Panchmahal

Personal details
- Party: Bharatiya Janata Party

Ratansinh Magansinh Rathod, also known as Ratan Singh, is an Indian politician and a member of parliament to the 17th Lok Sabha from Panchmahal Lok Sabha constituency, Gujarat. He won the 2019 Indian general election being a Bharatiya Janata Party candidate.
