= Kapadvanj Lok Sabha constituency =

Former constituency in Gujarat, India

Coordinates: 23.0°N 73.1°E

Kapadvanj
- Former Lok Sabha constituency

Constituency details
- Country: India
- Region: Western India
- State: Gujarat
- Established: 1952
- Abolished: 2008

Kapadvanj was a Lok Sabha constituency in Gujarat, India, within the Kheda district. It was abolished in 2009.

After the reorganisation of Lok Sabha constituencies in 2008, Kapadvanj seat ceased to exist and most/all of its area became part of the new Panchmahal Lok Sabha seat.

== Members of Parliament ==
- 1952: Maniben Vallabhbhai Patel, INC ( as Khira South Seat )
- 1952: F. R. D. Thakor, MJP ( as Khira North Seat )
- 1957: F. R. D. Thakor, MJP ( as Khira Seat )
- 1962: Pravinsinh Solanki, Indian National Congress ( as Khira Seat )
- 1967: Pravinsinh Solanki, Indian National Congress ( as Khira Seat )
- 1971: Dharamsinh Dadubhai Desai, Indian National Congress ( as Khira Seat )
- 1977: Dharamsinh Dadubhai Desai, Indian National Congress ( as Khira Seat )
- 1977: Shankersinh Vaghela, Janata Party
- 1980: Natwarsinh Solanki, Indian National Congress (Indira)
- 1984: Natwarsinh Solanki, Indian National Congress
- 1989: Gabhaji Mangaji Thakor, Bharatiya Janata Party
- 1991: Gabhaji Mangaji Thakor, Bharatiya Janata Party
- 1996: Jaysinhji Chauhan, Bharatiya Janata Party
- 1998: Jaysinhji Chauhan, Bharatiya Janata Party
- 1999: Shankersinh Vaghela, Indian National Congress
- 2004: Shankarsinh Vaghela, Indian National Congress

== See also ==
- Kapadvanj
- Godhra Lok Sabha constituency
- Panchmahal Lok Sabha constituency
- List of constituencies of the Lok Sabha
