= Shankersinh Vaghela =

Indian politician

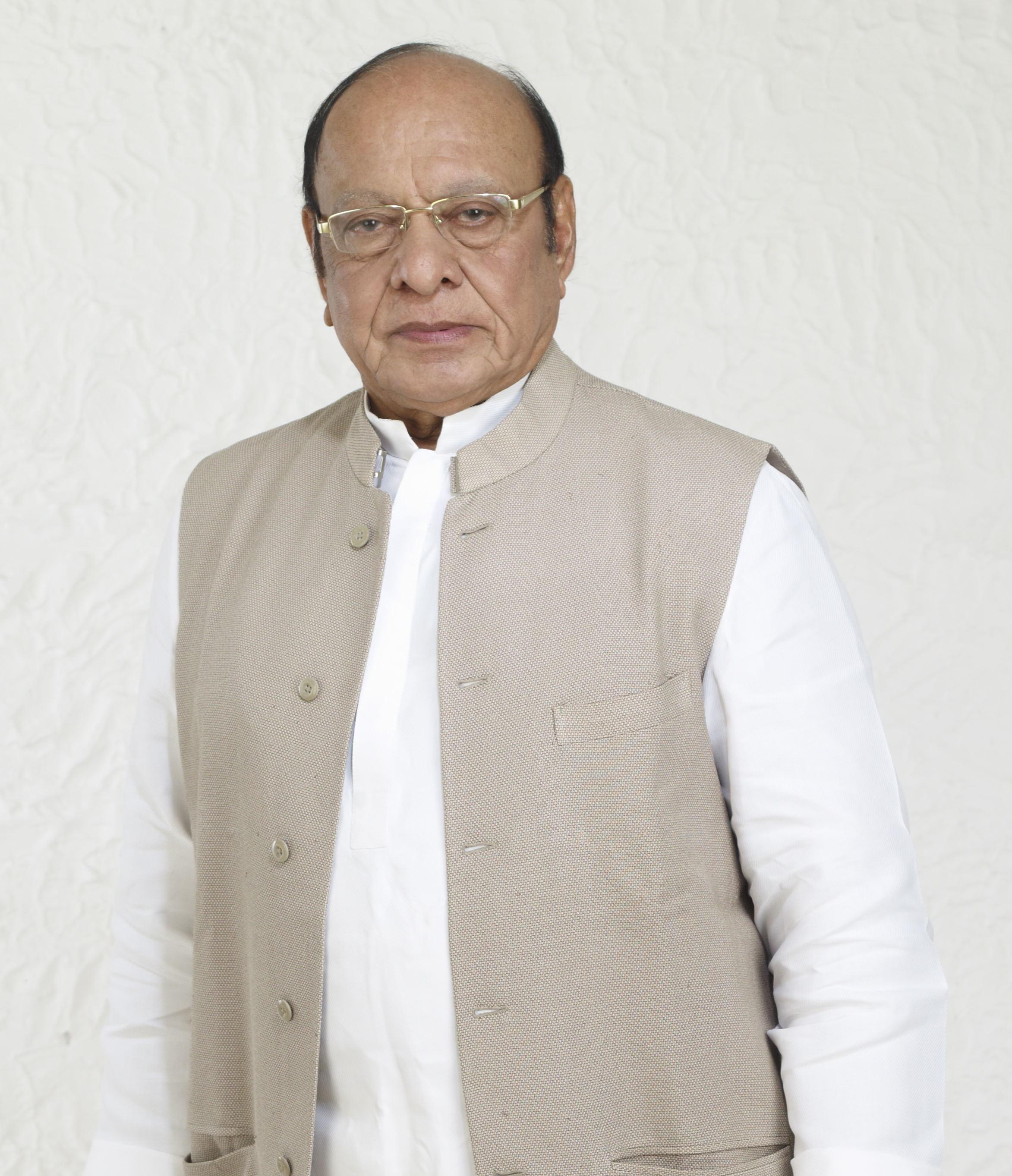

Leader of Opposition Gujarat Legislative Assembly
- In office 23 January 2013 – 21 July 2017
- Preceded by: Shaktisinh Gohil
- Succeeded by: Mohansinh Chhotubhai Rathava

Union Textile Minister of India
- In office 23 May 2004 – 22 May 2009
- Preceded by: Syed Shahnawaz Hussain
- Succeeded by: Dayanidhi Maran

12th Chief Minister of Gujarat
- In office 23 October 1996 – 28 October 1997
- Preceded by: President's rule
- Succeeded by: Dilip Parikh

Member of the Gujarat Legislative Assembly
- In office 2012–2017
- Constituency: Kapadvanj
- In office 1997–1998
- Constituency: Radhanpur

Member of Parliament, Lok Sabha
- In office 21 June 1991 – 16 May 1996
- Preceded by: Shantilal Patel
- Succeeded by: Shantilal Patel
- Constituency: Godhra
- In office 2 December 1989 – 21 June 1991
- Preceded by: G. I. Patel
- Succeeded by: L. K. Advani
- Constituency: Gandhinagar
- In office 22 March 1977 – 18 January 1980
- Preceded by: Dharmsinh Desai
- Succeeded by: Natvarsinh Solanki
- Constituency: Kapadvanj
- In office 6 October 1999 – 16 May 2009
- Preceded by: Jaysinhji Chauhan
- Succeeded by: Constituency Abolished
- Constituency: Kapadvanj

Member of Parliament, Rajya Sabha
- In office 10 April 1984 – 9 April 1990
- Constituency: Gujarat

Personal details
- Born: 21 July 1940 (age 86) Vasan, Bombay Province, British India
- Party: Independent (2020–present)
- Other political affiliations: Bharatiya Janata Party (1980's–1996); Rashtriya Janata Party (1996–1998); Indian National Congress (1998–2017); Jan Vikalp Morcha/AIHCP (2017–2019); Nationalist Congress Party (2019–2020); Praja Shakti Democratic Party (since 2022)
- Spouse: Gulab Ba (m. 1960)
- Children: 3 sons, including Mahendrasinh Vaghela
- Education: Gujarat University (MA in Economics)
- As of 25 February, 2006

Shankersinh Vaghela (born 21 July 1940) is an Indian politician and former Chief Minister of Gujarat. He was also the Leader of Opposition in 13th Gujarat Legislative Assembly.

Vagela started his political career with the Jana Sangh, which later merged into the Janata Party in 1977. After Janata Party split into various fractions, Vaghela became a senior leader of the Bharatiya Janata Party (BJP). In 1996, he broke away from the BJP and formed the Rashtriya Janata Party. He served as the Chief Minister of Gujarat from 1996 to 1997. Later, his party merged with Indian National Congress (Congress). On 21 July 2017, he left Congress and resigned from the post of the leader of opposition. He formed new outfit Jan Vikalp Morcha which contested but did not win any of the seats in 2017 Gujarat Legislative Assembly election. He was a member of the Nationalist Congress Party in 2019-20.

He has also served as a Member of Parliament, having been elected to the 6th, 9th (1989-1991), 10th, 13th and 14th Lok Sabhas. He was also a member of the Rajya Sabha from 1984 to 1989. He served as the Union Cabinet Minister of Textiles from 2004 to 2009 in the First Manmohan Singh Cabinet. He represented the Kapadvanj constituency in the Gujarat legislative assembly from 2012 to 2017.

== Personal life ==
Vaghela was born to Laxmansinh and Nathuba on 21 July 1940 in Vasan in Gandhinagar district, in Gujarat. He completed Master of Arts in economics from Gujarat University. Vaghela married Gulab Ba on 9 June 1960, with whom he has three sons. His son Mahendrasinh was MLA from Bayad from 2012 to 2017.

== Political career ==
Vaghela was an active member of Rashtriya Swayamsevak Sangh (RSS) before joining Jana Sangh. He was jailed during the Indira Gandhi Emergency.

=== Janata Party and Bharatiya Janata Party ===
After the Emergency was lifted, he was elected to the 6th Lok Sabha (1977–1979) on a Janata Party ticket from Kapadvanj but lost that seat in 1980 elections.

He was the Vice-President of the Janata Party in Gujarat and from 1980 to 1991 he was the General Secretary and President of the Bharatiya Janata Party (BJP) in Gujarat. He was a member of the Rajya Sabha from 1984 to 1989. In 1989 he was elected to the 9th Lok Sabha (1989–91) from Gandhinagar and in 1991 he was re-elected to the 10th Lok Sabha (1991–96) from Godhra (Lok Sabha constituency).

In 1995, BJP won a majority of 121 seats in the 182-member Legislative Assembly. Many party legislators expressed a preference for Vaghela as their leader. However, the BJP leadership installed Keshubhai Patel as the Chief Minister, and the support for Vaghela was gradually eroded. Narendra Modi is said to have thrown his weight behind Keshubhai Patel in preference to Vaghela, and was held responsible for the ensuing events by Vaghela.

In September 1995, Vaghela rebelled against the BJP leadership with the support of 47 MLAs. In the subsequent compromise worked out by the leadership, Keshubhai Patel was replaced by a Vaghela loyalist Suresh Mehta as the Chief Minister. Modi was temporarily banished from Gujarat.

Vaghela lost Godhra seat in May 1996 Lok Sabha polls, and soon left Bharatiya Janata Party with his supporters, bringing down Suresh Mehta's government.

=== Rashtriya Janata Party and Chief Minister ===
He floated his own party, named Rashtriya Janata Party and became Chief Minister with Congress Party's support in October 1996.

He won by-poll to Gujarat Assembly from Radhanpur seat in early 1997. But he had to resign as Chief Minister during ongoing political turmoil in Gujarat in October 1997, and his fellow-rebel ex-BJP MLA Dilip Parikh became CM with Vaghela's reluctant blessings.

Even Parikh's government did not last long and fresh elections for Gujarat Vidhan Sabha had to be called in 1998. Vaghela did not contest these elections. He merged his new party with Congress. BJP came back to power with thumping majority in Gujarat in 1998 and Keshubhai Patel became CM again.

=== Indian National Congress ===
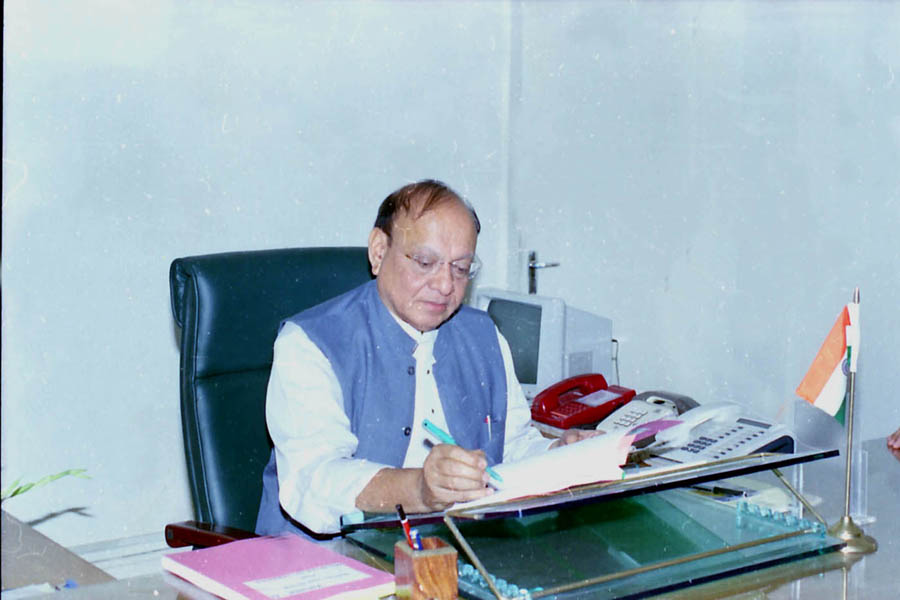
Vaghela takes charge as the Union Minister for Textiles in New Delhi on 24 May 2004

Vaghela was now established as a major politician in Indian National Congress Party. He was elected to Lok Sabha in 1999 and 2004 from Kapadvanj as Congress candidate. He was appointed as Gujarat Pradesh Congress Committee president on 17 July 2002.

He was made Union Cabinet Minister of Textiles in May 2004. Kapadvanj seat was reconstituted as Panchmahal seat in 2008. Vaghela lost Panchmahal seat to BJP in 2009 Lok Sabha polls. Ahead of the Gujarat Legislative Assembly election, 2012, he was appointed the Chairman of Campaign Committee. He contested from the Kapadvanj constituency and won.

He was named the leader of Opposition in the Gujarat Legislative Assembly. He has also served as the president of Gujarat Pradesh Congress Committee.

He contested 2014 Lok Sabha election from Sabarkantha constituency in Gujarat and lost to BJP candidate Dipsinh Shankarsinh Rathod.

Vaghela had been appointed chairman of the India Tourism Development Corporation (ITDC), which runs the Ashoka group of hotels across the country.

Vaghela was one of 57 Congress MLAs suspended for wearing slogans against BJP president Amit Shah.

In July 2017, he left Indian National Congress and stepped down from the post of Leader of Opposition in the Gujarat Legislative Assembly, after he and a few other INC MLAs voted against Ahmed Patel, the INC candidate for the Rajya Sabha, and supported BJP nominee Balvantsinh Rajput.

=== Jan Vikalp Morcha / AIHCP ===
Soon after he left the Indian National Congress, he launched a new outfit called Jan Vikalp Morcha with Parthesh Patel ahead of 2017 Gujarat Legislative Assembly election. As the application for registration of Jan Vikalp Morcha was not approved by the elections were announced by the Election Commission, his outfit fielded 95 candidates under the symbol and banner of Jaipur-based All India Hindustan Congress Party to contest election. AIHCP garnered only 0.3% (83,922) of total votes and did not win any seat.

=== Nationalist Congress Party ===
Vaghela joined the Nationalist Congress Party (NCP) in January 2019. He was appointed the National General Secretary as well as the State President of the party. He was removed from the post of State President in early June 2020, a week before 2020 Indian Rajya Sabha elections. He resigned from the NCP on 22 June 2020 citing his displeasure at his removal from the post and cross voting by NCP's only MLA Kandhal Jadeja in Rajya Sabha election.

=== Praja Shakti Democratic Party ===
On 21 August 2022, Vaghela launched a new party, Praja Shakti Democratic Party, with an intention to contest 2022 Gujarat Legislative Assembly election. Later he backed the INC instead.

== See also ==
- 1995–1997 Gujarat political crisis

Preceded by Suresh Mehta	Chief Minister of Gujarat; 23 October 1996 – 27 October 1997	Succeeded by Dilip Parikh
