= Gamdi =

Gamdi may refer to:

- Gamdi (Ahmedabad district), a village in Ahmedabad district, Gujarat, India
- Gamdi (Anand district), a town in Anand district, Gujarat, India
