= Kalabhai Dabhi =

Indian politician from Gujarat

Member of Gujarat Legislative Assembly
- Incumbent
- Assumed office 2017
- Preceded by: Shankersinh Vaghela
- Constituency: Bayad

Personal details
- Born: Kalabhai Raijibhai Dabhi
- Party: Bharatiya Janata Party
- Education: 8th Pass
- Occupation: Dairy farm

Kalabhai Raijibhai Dabhi is an Indian politician. He was elected to the Gujarat Legislative Assembly from Kapadvanj in the 2017 Gujarat Legislative Assembly election as a member of the Bharatiya Janata Party.

He shifted to the Indian National Congress but lost the Kapadvanj seat in the 2022 Gujarat Legislative Assembly election to the Bharatiya Janata Party candidate Rajeshkumar Maganbhai Zala by a margin of 31,878 votes.
