= 1995–1997 Gujarat political crisis =

Political crisis in Indian state of Gujarat

1995 to 1997 Gujarat political crisis
- Date: September 1995 to March 1998
- Location: Gujarat, India
- Also known as: Khajuraho Rebellion
- Type: Parliamentary crisis and government formation
- Cause: Break-away of Bharatiya Janata Party MLAs
- Participants: Bharatiya Janata Party (BJP); Indian National Congress (INC); Other political parties and Independents
- Outcome: Fall of the Keshubhai Patel government

In September 1995, Gujarat politician Shankersinh Vaghela broke away from Bharatiya Janata Party with his supporter 47 MLAs. He took his MLAs and shifted to Khajuraho in Madhya Pradesh.

== Background ==
In 1995, BJP won a majority of 121 legislators out of a 182-member Legislative Assembly, who expressed a preference for Shankersinh Vaghela as their leader. However, the BJP leadership installed Keshubhai Patel as the Chief Minister and the support for Vaghela was gradually eroded. But Patel resigned seven months on 21 October 1995. Suresh Mehta was made chief minister but later as Shankersinh Vaghela revolted once again and broke the party in 1996.

== Political crisis ==
Vaghela took 105 of 121 MLAs to his village Vasan in Gandhinagar, where a few MLAs of them left. Then remaining were taken to the home of Haribhai Chaudhary, a local Congress leader in Charada village of Gandhinagar. Rebel MLAs were flown to Khajuraho in Madhya Pradesh, as there was Digvijaya Singh's Congress government. Two names were suggested, Suresh Mehta and Kashiram Rana. Finally, Suresh Mehta was chosen as the chief minister.

Post this rebellion, the Vaghela camp was known as 'Khajurias' those who went to Khajuraho, The Keshubhai camp was called 'Hajurias' from Ji Huzoori or flatterers and rest were called 'Majurias' are the no-where people.

In 1996 Indian general election, Vaghela lost from Godhra seat and soon left Bharatiya Janata Party with his supporters, bringing down Suresh Mehta's government.

Vaghela rebelled against the Bharatiya Janata Party leadership with the support of 48 MLAs. He staked a claim to form a government with the support of Congress and also formed a political party called Rashtriya Janata Party. Vaghela was sworn in as a chief minister in October 1996.

But Vaghela had to resign as Chief Minister during ongoing political turmoil in Gujarat in October 1997 and his fellow-rebel ex-BJP MLA Dilip Parikh became CM with Vaghela's reluctant blessings. Even Parikh's government did not last long and fresh elections for Gujarat Vidhan Sabha had to be called in 1998. Vaghela did not contest these elections. He merged his new party with Indian National Congress.

== Aftermath ==
In March 1998, BJP returned to power led by Keshubhai Patel in the 1998 assembly elections and he became the chief minister again on 4 March 1998.
