= Daskroi Assembly constituency =

Legislative Assembly constituency in Gujarat State, India

Coordinates: 22.94°N 72.68°E

Daskroi
- Constituency No. 57 for the Gujarat Legislative Assembly

Constituency details
- Country: India
- Region: Western India
- State: Gujarat
- District: Ahmedabad
- Lok Sabha constituency: Kheda
- Established: 2007
- Total electors: 391,597
- Reservation: None

Member of Legislative Assembly
- 15th Gujarat Legislative Assembly
- Incumbent Babubhai Patel
- Party: Bharatiya Janata Party
- Elected year: 2022

Daskroi is one of the 182 Legislative Assembly constituencies of Gujarat state in India. It is part of Ahmedabad district.

== List of segments ==
This assembly seat represents the following segments,

1. Ahmedabad City Taluka (Part) – Ahmedabad Municipal Corporation (Part) Ward No. – Naroda (OG) 45, Nikol (OG) 46.
2. Daskroi Taluka (Part) Villages –

Hanspura, Enasan, Bilasiya, Pardhol, Vahelal, Huka, Navarangpura, Zanu, Lalpur, Bharkunda, Pasunj, Kubadthal, Bhuvaldi, Kuha, Chandial, Kanial, Vadod, Bhavda, Harnivav, Undrel, Ranodra, Govindada, Chavlaj, Bhuval, Hirapur, Badodara, Geratpur, Ropda, Aslali, Laxmipura, Kamod, Vanzar, Badrabad, Visalpur, Bakrol Badrabad, Paldi Kankaj, Ode, Pirana, Gamdi, Devdi, Istolabad, Barejdi, Chosar, Jetalpur, Giramtha, Miroli, Kasindara, Bhat, Navapura, Timba, Mahijda, Vasai, Naj, Bareja, Mithiya, Kathwada, Fatewadi, Lambha (CT), Nandej (CT).

== Member of Legislative Assembly ==
- 2007 - Babubhai Patel, Bharatiya Janata Party
- 2012 - Babubhai Patel, Bharatiya Janata Party

Year	Member	Party
2007	Babubhai Patel	Bharatiya Janata Party
2012	Babubhai Patel	Bharatiya Janata Party
2017	Babubhai Patel	Bharatiya Janata Party
2022	Babubhai Patel	Bharatiya Janata Party

== Election candidate ==
=== 2022 ===
Gujarat Assembly election, 2022:Daskroi Assembly constituency
Party	Candidate	Votes	%	±%
BJP	Babubhai Patel	159,107	62.93	
INC	Umedji Budhaji Zala	67,470	26.69	
AAP	Kirankumar Sureshchandra Patel	19,644	7.77	
NOTA	None of the above	4,189	1.66	
Majority		91,637	36.24	
Turnout				
Registered electors		382,297		

== Election results ==
=== 2017 ===
Gujarat Assembly Election, 2017: Daskroi
Party	Candidate	Votes	%	±%
BJP	Babubhai Patel	127,432	56.93	+1.88
INC	Pankajbhai Patel	82,367	36.80	+3.37
Majority			20.13	
Turnout		2,23,822	71.83	−0.05
BJP hold		Swing		

=== 2012 ===
Gujarat Assembly Election, 2012
Party	Candidate	Votes	%	±%
BJP	Babubhai Patel	95,813	55.05	
INC	Laxmanbhai Baraiya	58,180	33.43	
Majority		37,633	21.62	
Turnout		174,045	71.88	
BJP hold		Swing		

== See also ==
- List of constituencies of the Gujarat Legislative Assembly
- Ahmedabad district
