= Anand Assembly constituency =

Legislative Assembly constituency in Gujarat State, India

Coordinates: 22.55°N 72.95°E

Anand
- Constituency No. 112 for the Gujarat Legislative Assembly

Constituency details
- Country: India
- Region: Western India
- State: Gujarat
- District: Anand
- Lok Sabha constituency: Anand
- Established: 1972
- Total electors: 314,855
- Reservation: None

Member of Legislative Assembly
- 15th Gujarat Legislative Assembly
- Incumbent Yogesh R. Patel
- Party: Bharatiya Janata Party
- Elected year: 2022

Anand is one of the 182 Legislative Assembly constituencies of Gujarat state in India.

It is part of Anand district.

== List of segments ==
This assembly seat represents the following segments

1. Anand Taluka (Part) Villages – Lambhvel, Jol, Valasan, Sandesar, Meghva Gana, Gana, Vans Khiliya, Jitodiya, Hadgood, Jakhariya, Navli, Khandhali, Anand (M.C.), Mogri, Gamdi, Bakrol, Vithal Udyognagar (INA)

== Members of Legislative Assembly ==
- 1972 - Bhupatsinh Vaghela, Indian National Congress
- 1975 - Ranchhodbhai Solanki, Indian National Congress
- 1980 - Ranchhodbhai Solanki, Indian National Congress
- 1985 - Ranchhodbhai Solanki, Indian National Congress
- 1990 - Ghanshyam Patel, Janata Party
- 1995 - Dilipbhai Patel, Bharatiya Janta Party
- 1998 - Dilipbhai Patel, Bharatiya Janta Party
- 2002 - Dilipbhai Patel, Bharatiya Janta Party
- 2007 - Jyotsanaben Patel, Bharatiya Janata Party
- 2012 - Dilipbhai Manibhai Patel, Bharatiya Janata Party
- 2014 - Rohit Jashu Patel (by poll), Bharatiya Janata Party

Year	Member	Picture	Party
2017	Kantibhai Sodhaparmar		Indian National Congress
2022	Yogesh R. Patel		Bharatiya Janata Party

== Election results ==
=== 2022 ===
2022 Gujarat Legislative Assembly election:Anand
Party	Candidate	Votes	%	±%
BJP	Yogesh R. Patel	111,859	57.68	
INC	Kantibhai Sodha Parmar (Bhagat)	70,236	36.22	
AAP	Girishkumar Sedaliya	5,071	2.61	
NOTA	None of the above			
Majority		41,623	21.46	
Turnout				
BJP gain from INC		Swing		

=== 2017 ===
2017 Gujarat Legislative Assembly election:Anand
Party	Candidate	Votes	%	±%
INC	Kantibhai Sodha-Parmar	98,168	50.41	+2.58
BJP	Yogesh R. Patel	92,882	47.70	−0.71
NOTA	None of the above	2,646	1.35	N/A
Independent	Jatin Dave	1,009	0.51	N/A
Majority		5,286	2.71	N/A
Turnout		1,94,955	68.86	
INC gain from BJP		Swing	+1.65	

=== 2014 ===
By-election, 2014: Anand
Party	Candidate	Votes	%	±%
BJP	Rohit Patel	75,850	51.33	
INC	Kantibhai Sodha Parmar (Bhagat)	70,607	47.79	
NOTA	None of the above	2,138	1.43	
Majority		5,243	3.50	
Turnout		1,49,914	58.48	
BJP hold		Swing		

=== 2012 ===
2012 Gujarat Legislative Assembly election: Anand
Party	Candidate	Votes	%	±%
BJP	Dilipbhai Manibhai Patel	82,956	48.41	
INC	Kantibhai Sodha Parmar (Bhagat)	81,969	47.83	
IND	Raj Dilipsinh Somsinh	2,539	1.48	
Majority		987	0.58	
Turnout		1,71,360	73.93	
BJP hold		Swing		

== See also ==
- List of constituencies of Gujarat Legislative Assembly
- Anand district
