= Mitesh Rameshbhai Patel =

Indian politician

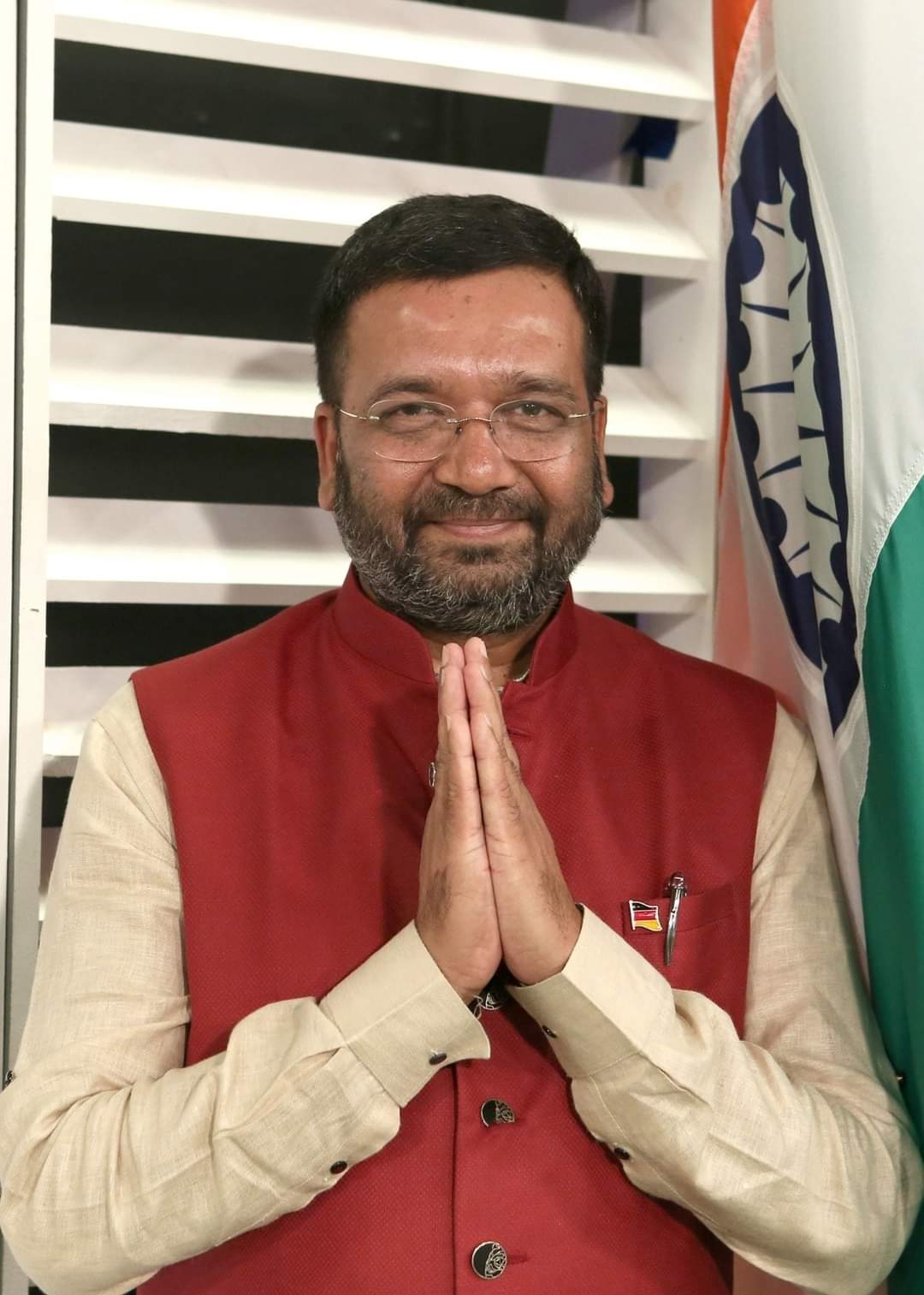

Member of Parliament, Lok Sabha
- Incumbent
- Assumed office 23 May 2019
- Preceded by: Dilip Patel
- Constituency: Anand, Gujarat

Personal details
- Born: Vasad, Anand, Gujarat, India
- Party: Bharatiya Janata Party
- Spouse: Smt. Dipaliben Mitesh Patel
- Parent: Rameshbhai Shanabhai Patel (father)

Mitesh Rameshbhai Patel (known as Bakabhai) is an Indian politician and Chairperson and Managing Director of Laxmi Protein Products Pvt Ltd located in Vasad, Gujarat. He was elected to the Lok Sabha, lower house of the Parliament of India from Anand, Gujarat in the 2019 Indian general election as a member of the Bharatiya Janata Party. He recorded a victory by 197,718 votes. He defeated Bharatsinh Madhavsinh Solanki of Indian National Congress, who served as Minister of State under UPAII.

== Career ==
He has been associated with the BJP since his young days. He has been the Treasurer of Anand, BJP for several years where he worked at the ground level to strengthen the party. He worked closely with the Co-operative societies of Anand. BJP's top leadership considered him for the seat after seeing his perceived dedication.

== Parliamentary Committees ==
1. Member, Standing Committee on Food, Consumer Affairs and Public Distribution.

2. Member, Standing Committee on Petroleum and Natural Gas.

3. Member, Consultative Committee on Coal and Mines.
