= Daskroi taluka =

Town and taluka of Ahmedabad District, India

Daskroi
- Taluka of Gujarat
- Interactive map of Daskroi
- Country: India
- State: Gujarat
- District: Ahmedabad
- Headquarters: Daskroi

Government
  - Body: Ahmedabad Municipal Corporation

Area
  - Total: 515 km^{2} (199 sq mi)
- Elevation: 55 m (180 ft)

Population (2011)
  - Total: 350,000(2,011)
  - Density: 680/km^{2} (1,800/sq mi)

Languages
  - Official: Gujarati, Hindi
- Time zone: UTC+5:30 (IST)
- Postal code: 382001to xxx
- Telephone code: +91-079
- Vehicle registration: GJ 1,27,38
- Lok Sabha constituency: Kheda
- Civic agency: Ahmedabad Municipal Corporation
- Website: gujaratindia.com

Daskroi is a town and taluka of Ahmedabad District, India.It is part of the Kheda Lok Sabha constituency.

== Populated places ==
The table lists the towns and villages of the Daskroi Taluka according to the 2011 census.

S.No.	Villages	Population
1	Aslali	8,214
2	Bareja	20000
3	Badodara	3,176
4	Bakrol Bujrang	3,538
5	Barejadi	1,602
6	Bharkunda	1,160
7	Bhat	5,858
8	Bhavda	2,904
8	Bhuval	3,094
9	Bhuvaldi	7,279
10	Bibipur	1,160
11	Chandial	2,838
12	Chavlaj	3,390
13	Chosar	2,328
14	Devdi	2,830
15	Dhamatvan	5,782
16	Gamdi	1,533
17	Gatrad	5,560
18	Geratnagar	867
19	Geratpur	2,021
20	Giramtha	4,151
21	Govindada	642
22	Harniyav	5,088
23	Hirapur	4,559
24	Huka	1,444
25	Istolabad	1,237
26	Jetalpur	6,516
27	Kaniyel	3,134
28	Kasindra	8,003
29	Khodiyar	3,327
30	Kubadthal	3,691
31	Kuha	10,102
32	Lalpur	558
33	Lapkaman	2,194
34	Lilapur	1,567
35	Mahijda	2,748
36	Memadpur	1,520
37	Miroli	3,257
38	Navapura	2,475
39	Navarangpura	770
40	Naz	2,387
41	Ode	2,197
42	Paldi Kankaj	4,751
43	Pardhol	3,946
44	Pasunj	5,145
45	Ranodara	4,131
46	Ropda	1,228
47	Timba	1,502
48	Undrel	4,361
49	Vadod	4,374
50	Vahelal	3,074
51	Vanch	6,674
52	Vasai	2,119
53	Visalpur	4,508
54	Zanu	4,268
