= F. R. D. Thakor =

Indian politician

- Portrait of F. R. D. Thakor

Member of Parliament, Lok Sabha
- In office 1957–1962
- Constituency: Kheda

Member of Constituent Assembly of India
- Constituency: Kaira (now Kheda)

Personal details
- Born: 5 September 1909 Ghodasar, Bombay State
- Party: Mahagujarat Janata Parishad
- Spouse: Rani Saheb Jayendrakunverba
- Children: 9

Fatehsinhji Ratansinhji Dabhi Thakor (koli) (stylized as F. R. D. Thakor) was an Indian politician and Member of Parliament elected during the 2nd General elections of India held in 1957. He represented in modern-day Kheda parliamentary constituency from 1957 to 1962.

== Life and background ==
Dabhi was born on 5 September 1909 and raised in Ghodasar area of Bombay state and in modern-day Mumbai. He received his education from Scott College, Sadra and diploma in Electronic engineering from Technical and Commercial Radio College, London.

== Career ==
Dabhi was the 2nd class magistrate of former Ghodasar state from 1930 to 1943 when India was under the British rule. He was then elected member of constituent assembly on behalf of all non-Salute states of India, and resigned the assembly office before the term ended. After Independence of India, he contested 2nd Lok Sabha elections in 1957 and served as the member of parliament till 1962.

== Personal life ==
Dabhi was deeply attached to radio and automobile engineering, and a fan of Big-game hunting. He was primarily interested in Astrology and medicines. On 24 April 1931, Dabhi married to Rani Saheb Jayendrakunverba with whom he had six daughters and three sons.
