= Babubhai Patel =

Babubhai Patel may refer to:

- Babubhai Patel (cricketer) (1911–?), Indian cricketer
- Babubhai Patel (politician), Indian politician
- Babubhai J. Patel (1911–2002), chief minister of Gujarat state in India
