= Anand Lok Sabha constituency =

Lok Sabha constituency in Gujarat

Coordinates: 22.6°N 72.9°E

Anand
- Lok Sabha constituency
- Anand Lok Sabha Constituency આણંદ લોક સભા મતદાર વિભાગ

Constituency details
- Country: India
- Region: Western India
- State: Gujarat
- Assembly constituencies: Khambhat; Borsad; Anklav; Umreth; Anand; Petlad; Sojitra
- Established: 1957
- Total electors: 17,80,182
- Reservation: None

Member of Parliament
- 18th Lok Sabha
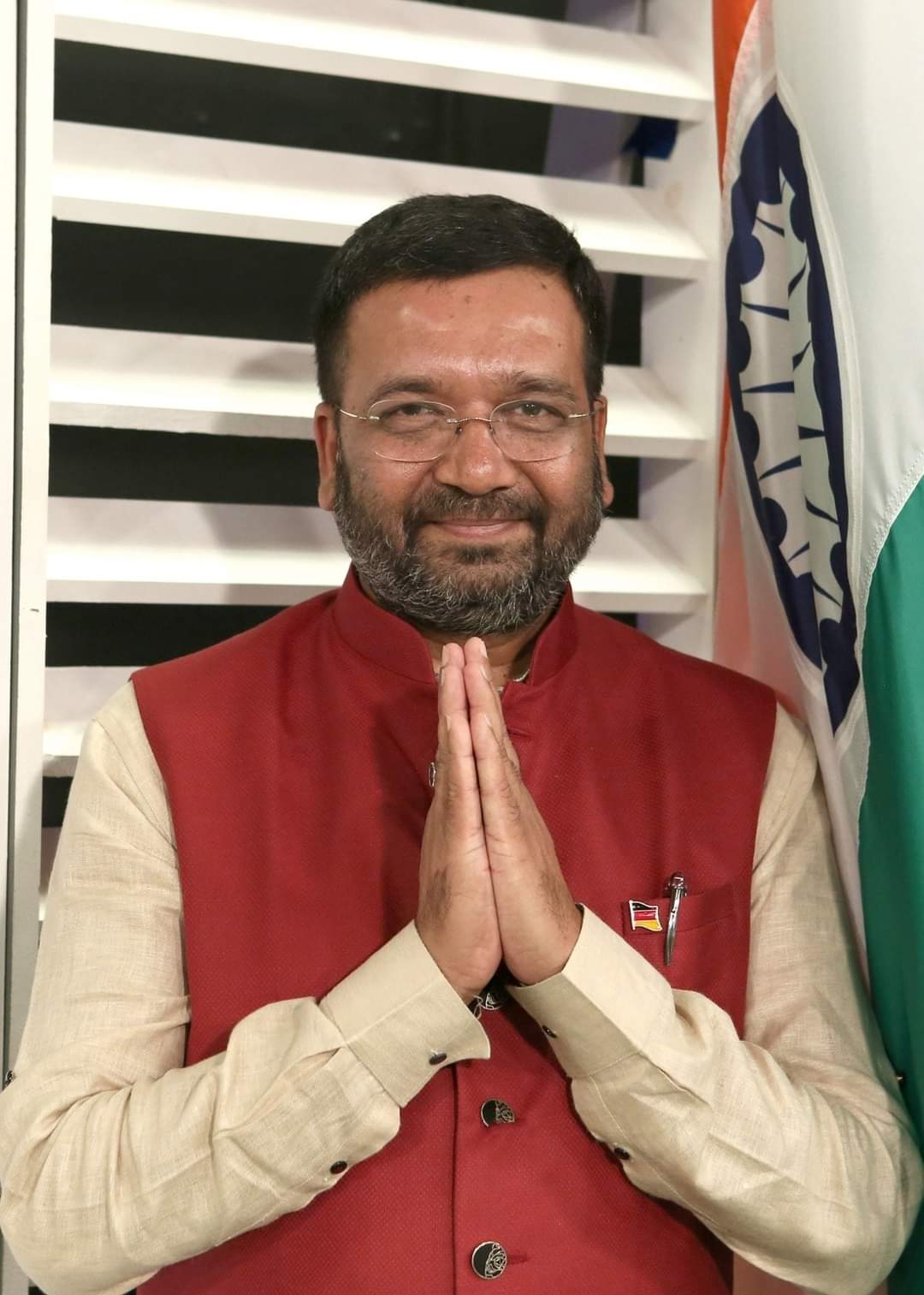
- Incumbent Miteshbhai Patel
- Party: Bharatiya Janata Party
- Elected year: 2024

Anand is one of the 26 Lok Sabha (parliamentary) constituencies in Gujarat in India.

== Assembly segments ==
Presently, Anand Lok Sabha constituency comprises seven Vidhan Sabha (legislative assembly) segments. These are:

Constituency number	Name	Reserved for (SC/ST/None)	District	Party	2024 Lead
108	Khambhat	None	Anand	BJP	BJP
109	Borsad	None	Anand	BJP	BJP
110	Anklav	None	Anand	INC	INC
111	Umreth	None	Anand	BJP	BJP
112	Anand	None	Anand	BJP	BJP
113	Petlad	None	Anand	BJP	BJP
114	Sojitra	None	Anand	BJP	BJP

== Members of Parliament ==
Year	Winner	Party
1957	Maniben Patel	Indian National Congress
1962	Narendrasingh Mahida	Swatantra Party
1967	Narendrasingh Mahida	Indian National Congress
1971	Pravinsinh Solanki	Indian National Congress
1977	Ajitsinh Dabhi	Indian National Congress
1980	Ishwarbhai Chavda	Indian National Congress
1984	Ishwarbhai Chavda	Indian National Congress
1989	Natubhai Manibhai Patel	Bharatiya Janata Party
1991	Ishwarbhai Chavda	Indian National Congress
1996	Ishwarbhai Chavda	Indian National Congress
1998	Ishwarbhai Chavda	Indian National Congress
1999	Dipakbhai Patel	Bharatiya Janta Party
2004	Bharatsinh Solanki	Indian National Congress
2009	Bharatsinh Solanki	Indian National Congress
2014	Dilipbhai Patel	Bharatiya Janata Party
2019	Mitesh Rameshbhai Patel	Bharatiya Janata Party
2024	Mitesh Rameshbhai Patel	Bharatiya Janata Party

== Election results ==
=== 2024 ===
2024 Indian general election: Anand
Party	Candidate	Votes	%	±%
BJP	Mitesh Rameshbhai Patel	612,484	52.44	▼4.66
INC	Amit Chavda	5,22,545	44.74	▲5.47
NOTA	None of the Above	15,930	1.36	▼0.30
BSP	Sureshbhai Dhulabhai Patel	5,831	0.50	N/A
IND	Bhoi Ashishkumar Thakorbhai	5,542	0.47	N/A
Majority		89,939	7.70	▼10.13
Turnout		11,70,984	65.76	▼1.28
BJP hold		Swing		

=== 2019 ===
2019 Indian general elections: Anand
Party	Candidate	Votes	%	±%
BJP	Mitesh Rameshbhai Patel	633,097	57.10	+6.55
INC	Bharatsinh Solanki	4,35,379	39.27	−4.75
RRP	Bhatt Sunilkumar Narendrabhai	1,155	0.1	N/A
NOTA	None of the Above	18,392	1.66	−0.08
Majority		1,97,718	17.83	+11.30
Turnout		11,10,084	67.04	+2.15
BJP hold		Swing		

=== General election 2014 ===
2014 Indian general elections: Anand
Party	Candidate	Votes	%	±%
BJP	Dilip Patel	4,90,829	50.55	+8.94
INC	Bharatsinh Solanki	4,27,403	44.02	−7.55
Independent	Firojbhai Vahora	6,689	0.69	−−−
NOTA	None of the Above	16,872	1.74	−−−
Majority		63,426	6.53	−3.43
Turnout		9,71,262	64.89	+16.48
BJP gain from INC		Swing	+5.17	

=== General elections 2009 ===
This is the result of 2009 Lok Sabha election.

2009 Indian general elections: Anand
Party	Candidate	Votes	%	±%
INC	Bharatsinh Solanki	3,48,652	51.57%	
BJP	Dipakbhai Patel	2,81,336	41.61%	
NCP	Babubhai Parmar	6,257	0.93%	
Majority		67,318	9.96%	
Turnout		6,76,379	48.41%	
INC hold		Swing		

=== General elections 2004 ===
This is the result of 2004 Lok Sabha elections.

2004 Indian general elections: Anand
Party	Candidate	Votes	%	±%
INC	Bharatsinh Solanki	3,07,762	52.00%	
BJP	Jayprakash Patel	2,46,677	41.67%	
Majority		61,085	10.33%	
Turnout		5,91,842	51.66%	
INC hold		Swing		

== See also ==
- Anand District
- List of constituencies of the Lok Sabha
