= Mahendrasinh Vaghela =

Indian Bharatiya Janata Party politician

Member of Gujarat Legislative Assembly
- In office 2012–2017
- Preceded by: Udesinh Zala
- Succeeded by: Dhavalsinh Zala
- Constituency: Bayad

Member of Gujarat Legislative Assembly
- In office 2007–2012
- Constituency: Meghraj

Personal details
- Born: Mahendrasinh Vaghela
- Party: Indian National Congress (before 2017, 2022–present)
- Other political affiliations: Bharatiya Janata Party (2017–2022)
- Parent: Shankarsinh Vaghela (father)
- Education: B.A.
- Alma mater: Gujarat University
- Occupation: Farmer, businessman, social worker

Mahendrasinh Shankarsinh Vaghela is an Indian politician from Gujarat. He was elected to the 12th Gujarat Legislative Assembly from Bayad in the 2012 Gujarat Legislative Assembly election as a member of the Indian National Congress (INC). He is a son of former Gujarat chief minister Shankarsinh Vaghela.
