= Khushiram Jeswani =

Indian politician

Member of Parliament, Lok Sabha
- In office 1991-1996
- Preceded by: Prabhatsinh Chauhan
- Succeeded by: Dinsha Patel
- Constituency: Kheda, Gujarat

Personal details
- Born: 13 September 1940 (age 85) Chachro, Tharparkar District, Sindh, British India
- Party: BJP

Khushiram Jeswani (born 13 September 1940) is an Indian politician. He was elected to the Lok Sabha, lower house of the Parliament of India from Kheda, Gujarat as a member of the Bharatiya Janata Party.
