= Devusinh Jesingbhai Chauhan =

Indian politician

Devusinh Chauhan
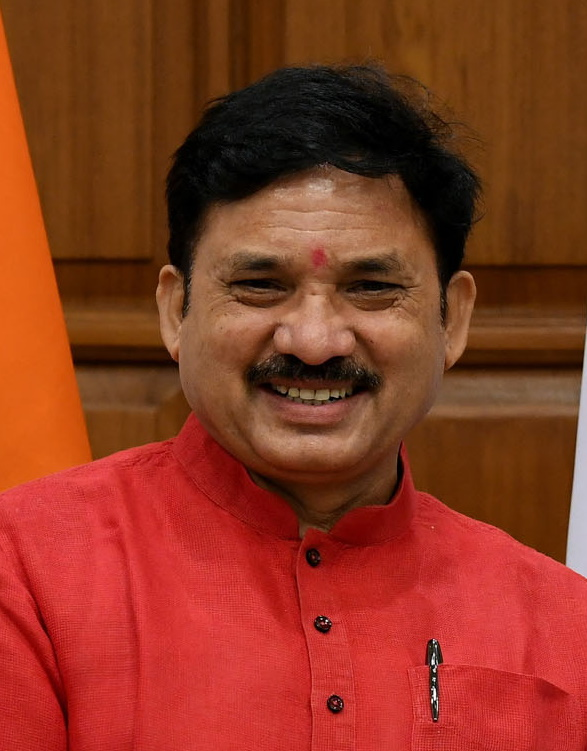
- Chauhan in 2021

Minister of State for Communications
- In office 7 July 2021 – 11 June 2024
- Prime Minister: Narendra Modi
- Minister: Ashwini Vaishnaw
- Preceded by: Sanjay Dhotre

Member of Parliament, Lok Sabha
- Incumbent
- Assumed office 16 May 2014
- Preceded by: Dinsha Patel
- Constituency: Kheda

Member of Gujarat Legislative Assembly
- In office 2007–2014
- Preceded by: Rakesh Rao
- Succeeded by: Kesarisinh Solanki
- Constituency: Matar

Personal details
- Party: Bharatiya Janata Party
- Occupation: Engineer
- As of 15 December, 2016 Source: []

Devusinh Jesingbhai Chauhan is an Indian politician. He served as Minister of State for Communications of India. He is member of parliament to the 17th Lok Sabha from Kheda (Lok Sabha constituency), Gujarat. He won the 2014 Indian general election being a Bharatiya Janata Party candidate.
