= Pravinsinh Solanki =

Indian politician

Tikasaheb (Mogar) Pravinsinhji Natvarsinhji Solanki
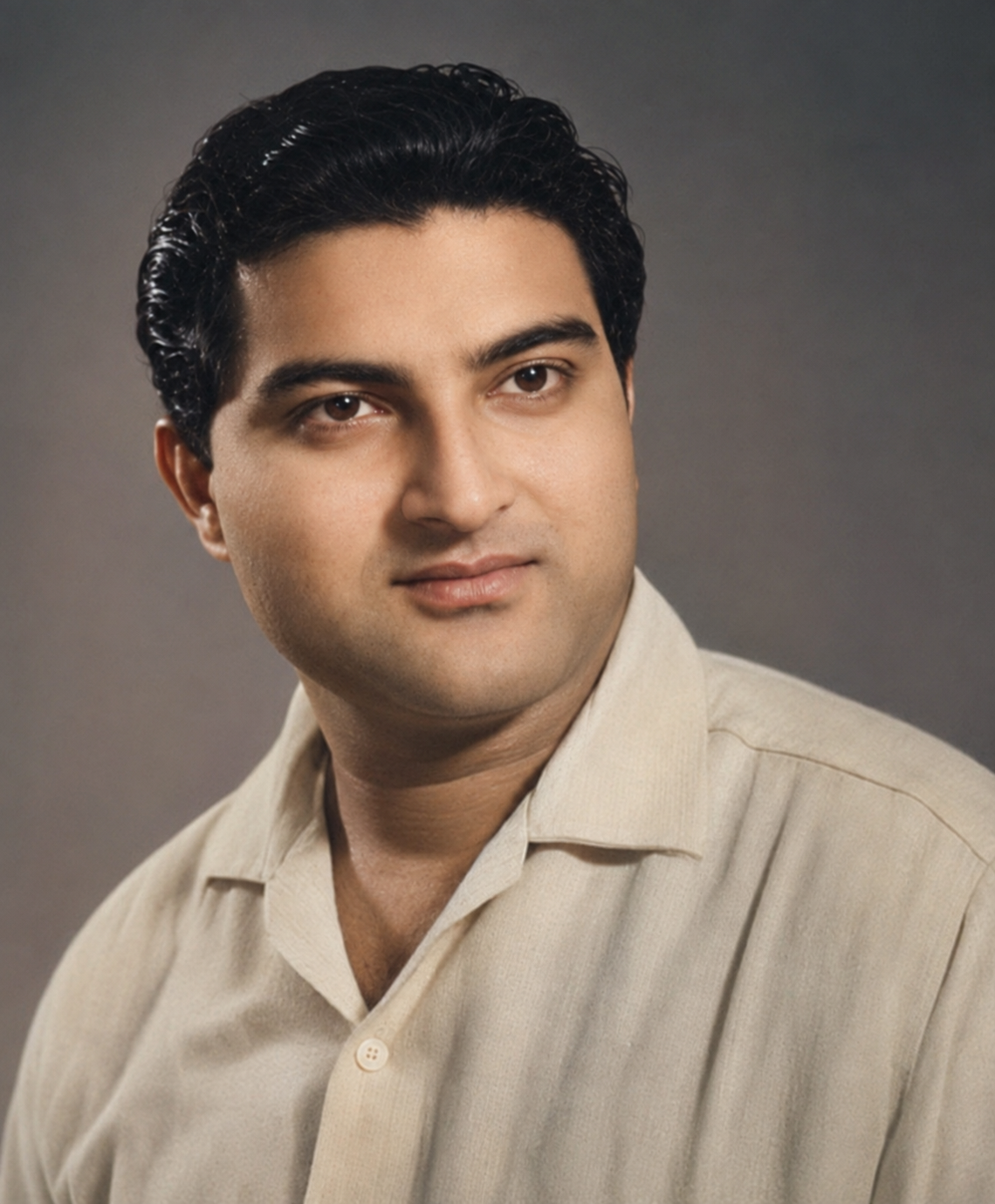
- Pravinsinhji Solanki (Tikasaheb)

Member of Parliament, Lok Sabha
- In office 1962–1971
- Preceded by: Fatehsinhji Thakor
- Succeeded by: Dharmsinh Desai
- Constituency: Kapadvanj, Gujarat

Member of Parliament, Lok Sabha
- In office 1971–1977
- Preceded by: Narendrasingh Mahida
- Succeeded by: Ajitsinh Dabhi
- Constituency: Anand, Gujarat

Personal details
- Born: Pravinsinhji Natvarsinhji Solanki; 9 July 1935 Mogar, Anand district, Gujarat, India
- Died: 24 April 2005 Mogar, Anand district, Gujarat, India
- Party: Indian National Congress (Organization)
- Other political affiliations: Indian National Congress, Swatantra Party
- Spouse: Hansakunwarba
- Children: Thakoresaheb Shri. Jayrajsinhji Praveensinhji Solanki, Shri. Shailrajsinhji Praveensinhji Solanki, Kumari Devyaniba

Pravinsinhji Natvarsinhji Solanki (9 July 1935 – 24 April 2005) was an Indian politician who served as a Member of the Lok Sabha, the lower house of the Parliament of India, representing constituencies in Gujarat. He represented Kapadvanj from 1962 to 1971 and Anand from 1971 to 1977.

== Early life and family ==
Pravinsinhji Natvarsinhji Solanki was born on 9 July 1935 at Mogar in present-day Anand district, Gujarat. He was the eldest son of Natvarsinhji Kesarisinhji Solanki, the former Thakore Saheb of Mogar and a Member of Parliament.

== Family background and lineage ==
According to The Ruling Princes, Chiefs and Leading Personages of Western India (1910), the ruling family of Mogar traced its lineage to the Solanki (Chaulukya) Rajputs.

According to History of the Godhra Branch of the Solanki Dynasty (1915), the genealogy of the Solanki lineage in central Gujarat traces the family's territorial history through Thikatoda, Godhra, Bakrol, Pampavati, Napa, Gadh-Gajana, Deva, Valod and Vadod.

The same genealogy records Dalkandevji as having established Godhra in Vikram Samvat 1110 (1053 CE), and records the establishment of the Mogar branch in Vikram Samvat 1774 (1717 CE) by Jagmalji and Jaymalji, sons of Adaybhanji.

== Political career ==
Pravinsinhji Natvarsinhji Solanki served as a Member of the Lok Sabha representing constituencies in Gujarat.

He was elected to the Lok Sabha from the Kapadvanj constituency in the 1962 Indian general election. He subsequently represented Kapadvanj in the Lok Sabha until 1971.

In the 1971 Indian general election, Solanki was elected to the Lok Sabha from the Anand constituency. He represented Anand in Parliament until 1977.

During his parliamentary career, Solanki was associated with the Indian National Congress and subsequently with the Indian National Congress (Organization). His political affiliations also included the Swatantra Party.
