= Natvarsinh Solanki =

Indian politician

Thakoresaheb Natvarsinhji Kesarisinhji Solanki Member of parliament, Lok Sabha
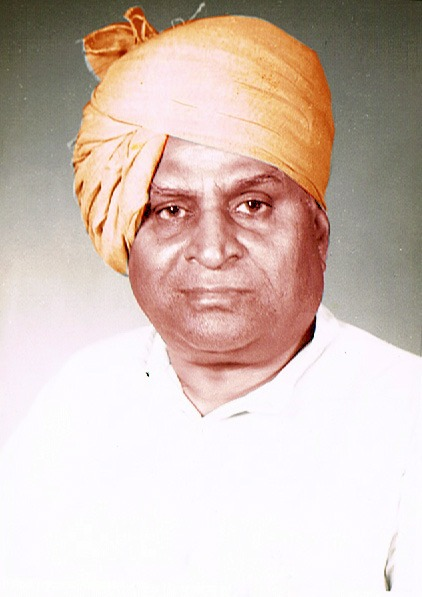
- Natvarsinhji Kesarisinhji Solanki
- Born: Natvarsinh Solanki; 13 January 1915; Mogar Village, Anand, Gujarat, Kheda district, British India
- Died: 22 May 2004; Mogar Village, Anand, Gujarat, Kheda district, India
- Education: Baroda College, Bombay University
- Occupations: Former Jagirdar, Politician, Agriculturist
- Organization: Gujarat Kshatriya Sabha
- Known for: Member of Parliament, cooperative movement, Gujarat Kshatriya Sabha
- Political party: Congress (I)
- Movement: Kshatriya Movement
- Spouse: Vasantkunverba
- Children: 3 (including Pravinsinh Solanki (Tikasaheb), Harishchandrasinh Solanki (Pyrasaheb), and Jitendrasinh Solanki (Bachudada))

Natvarsinhji Kesarisinhji Solanki was an Indian politician from the Gujarat state of India. He was associated with the Charotar Kshatriya Samaj and the Gujarat Kshatriya Sabha and served as a Member of the Lok Sabha, the lower house of the Parliament of India.

Multiple scholars, including Atul Kohli and Rajni Kothari, describe Solanki as a Rajput.

== Family background and lineage ==
According to History of the Godhra Branch of the Solanki Dynasty (1915), the genealogy of the Solanki lineage in central Gujarat traces the family's territorial history through Thikatoda, Godhra, Bakrol, Pampavati, Napa, Gadh-Gajana, Deva, Valod and Vadod.

The same genealogy records Dalkandevji as having established Godhra in Vikram Samvat 1110 (1053 CE), and records the establishment of the Mogar branch in Vikram Samvat 1774 (1717 CE) by Jagmalji and Jaymalji, sons of Adaybhanji.

The ruling family of Mogar was associated with the later Mogar branch of the Solanki lineage. Natvarsinhji Kesarisinhji Solanki subsequently served as Thakore Saheb of Mogar. A 1910 account of the ruling families of western India also describes the ruling family of Mogar as belonging to the Solanki (Chaulukya) Rajput lineage.

== Political career ==
Natvarsinhji Solanki entered electoral politics in the former Bombay State. In the 1952 Bombay State Legislative Assembly election, he was elected from the Anand North constituency as a candidate of the Indian National Congress. The Election Commission of India's statistical report records him as "Solanki Natvarsinhji Keshrisinhji" and shows that he received 23,436 votes, defeating Patel Bhailalbhai Dayabhai of the Kisan Mazdoor Praja Party (KMPP), who received 16,213 votes. The report records a margin of 7,223 votes and polling on 26 March 1952.

In the 1967 Gujarat Legislative Assembly election, N.K. Solanki was elected from the Balasinor constituency on the Swatantra Party ticket.

Natvarsinhji Solanki later served as a Member of Parliament representing the Kapadvanj Lok Sabha constituency. He was elected to the Lok Sabha in the 1980 Indian general election and was re-elected in the 1984 Indian general election, on both occasions representing the Indian National Congress.

Alongside his political career, he was active in social and community organisations in Gujarat. The Somnath Kelavani Mandal identifies him as a life president of the Gujarat Kshatriya Sabha, president of the Talukdari Hostel Trust and Somnath Kelavani Mandal, editor of the Kshatriya Bandhu weekly, and president of the Charotar Arya Samaj.

Natvarsinhji Solanki was also involved in the cooperative movement. According to the Gujarat State Co-operative Grain Growers Federation Limited, the organisation was established on 12 December 1984 with former Member of Parliament Natvarsinh Kesrisingh Solanki as its first chairman. The federation was established to assist unorganised farmers and subsequently undertook procurement and marketing activities relating to agricultural produce.
