= All India Hindustan Congress Party =

- President: Buddh Prakash Sharma
- Founded: 15 November 2015; 10 years ago
- Headquarters: Jaipur, Rajasthan
- Membership: 1.35 million (approx)
- Alliance: Jan Vikalp Morcha (2017-)

Election symbol

Website
- Official Website

All India Hindustan Congress Party (abbreviated as AIHCP) is a political party based in Jaipur. Rajasthan, India. The party was formed by Budhh Prakash Sharma in 2015.

== History Organisation and structure ==
=== Central Working Committee ===
The president and the Central Working Committee (CWC) are elected by delegates from state and district parties at an annual national conference.

President

1. Buddh Prakash Sharma

Vice Presidents

General Secretaries

Secretaries

Joint Secretaries

Treasurer

Legal Advisor 1 Pradeep Maheshwari (Adv)

=== Frontal and wing ===
- Student
- Women
- Youth

=== Department and cell ===
- Media department
- Social media department
- Legal, Human Rights and RTI department
- SC department
- ST department
- OBC department
- Minority department
- Farmers and Workers department
- Teacher's cell
- Professional's cell
- Trader's Cell

== Elections ==
=== Gujarat Assembly election, 2017 ===
- The Election Commission of India has allotted Tractor Chalata Kisan (A farmer driving a tractor) symbol to AIHCP under para 10 B (2017) order dated 9 August 2017 for 2017 Gujarat Legislative Assembly election.
- AIHCP contested on 95 seats in the 2017 Gujarat Legislative Assembly election under the leadership of Ex chief minister of Gujrat Shankersinh Vaghela who had floated Jan Vikalp Morcha earlier but the application for registration of Jan Vikalp Morcha was not approved by the time the elections were announced. AIHCP garnered 0.3% (83,922) of total votes and did not win any seat.

=== Karnataka Assembly election, 2018 ===
- The Election Commission of India has allotted Tractor Chalata Kisan (A farmer driving a Tractor) symbol to AIHCP for 2018 Karnataka Legislative Assembly election.
- AIHCP contested one seat in the 2018 Karnataka Legislative Assembly election . In charge National general secretary Mohammedali Kurlageri.

=== Rajasthan Assembly election, 2018 ===
- The Election Commission of India has allotted Pen Nib With Seven Rays symbol to AIHCP under para 10 B (2018) order dated 16 August 2018 for 2018 Rajasthan Legislative Assembly election.

=== Madhya Pradesh Assembly election, 2018 ===
- The Election Commission of India has allotted Telephone symbol to AIHCP under para 10 B (2018) order dated 24 September 2018 for 2018 Madhya Pradesh Legislative Assembly election.

=== Chhattisgarh Assembly election, 2018 ===
- The Election Commission of India has allotted Telephone symbol to AIHCP under para 10 B (2018) order dated 24 September 2018 for 2018 Chhattisgarh Legislative Assembly election.

=== Mizoram Assembly election, 2018 ===
- The Election Commission of India has allotted Farmer Ploughing within Square symbol to AIHCP under para 10 B (2018) order dated 24 September 2018 for 2018 Mizoram Legislative Assembly election.

== Electoral Performance ==
=== Legislative Assembly elections ===
Election	State	Leader	Seats contested	Seats won	votes	% of votes	% of votes in seats contested
2017	Gujarat	Shankersinh Vaghela	95	0	83,904	0.28	0.56
2018	Karnataka	Mohammedali Kurlageri	1	0	108	0.00	0.08
2018	Rajasthan	Budhprakash Sharma	5	0	6,613	0.02	0.75
2018	Madhya Pradesh	Budhprakash Sharma	5	0	3,762	0.01	0.46

== See also ==
- Indian National Congress breakaway parties
- Elections in India
- List of political parties in India
