= Ishwarbhai Chavda =

Indian politician

Ishwarbhai Chavda was a leader of Indian National Congress from Gujarat. He was born on August 2, 1913. He represented Anand in Lok Sabha for five terms. He died in 2007. He was the father in law of former Gujarat Chief minister Madhav Singh Solanki.

== Personal life ==
He was married to Surajben Chavda. The couple had 5 children including 3 daughters and two sons.
