= Yogesh R. Patel =

Indian politician

Yogesh Rajivbhai Patel, also known as Bapji, (born 1965) is an Indian politician from Gujarat. He is a member of the Gujarat Legislative Assembly from Anand Assembly constituency in Anand district. He won the 2022 Gujarat Legislative Assembly election representing the Bharatiya Janata Party.

== Early life and education ==
Patel is from Anand, Gujarat. He is the son of Rajivbhai Patel. He studied Class 10 at D.N. High School, Anand and passed the SSC examinations in 1980. Later, he discontinued his studies. He and his wife run the family business.

== Career ==
Patel won from Anand Assembly constituency representing the Bharatiya Janata Party in the 2022 Gujarat Legislative Assembly election. He polled 111,859 votes and defeated his nearest rival and sitting MLA, Kantibhai Sodha Parmar of the Indian National Congress, by a margin of 41,623 votes. He lost the 2017 Gujarat Legislative Assembly election to Kantibhai Parmar, the Congress candidate, by a margin of 5,286 votes.
