= Prabhatsinh Chauhan =

Indian politician (born 1932)

Member of Parliament, Lok Sabha
- In office 1989–1991
- Preceded by: Ajitsinh Dabhi
- Succeeded by: Khushiram Jeswani
- Constituency: Kheda, Gujarat

Personal details
- Born: 11 February 1932 Modaj, Kaira District, British India
- Party: Janata Dal

Prabhatsinh Chauhan (born 11 February 1932) is an Indian politician from Gujarat. He was elected to the Lok Sabha, the lower house of the Parliament of India, from 1989 till 1991, from Kheda, Gujarat, as a member of the Janata Dal.
