= Kheda Lok Sabha constituency =

One of the parliamentary constituencies in Gujarat, India

Coordinates: 22.8°N 72.7°E

Kheda
- Lok Sabha constituency

Constituency details
- Country: India
- Region: Western India
- State: Gujarat
- Assembly constituencies: Daskroi; Dholka; Matar; Nadiad; Mehmedabad; Mahudha; Kapadvanj
- Established: 1952
- Reservation: None

Member of Parliament
- 18th Lok Sabha
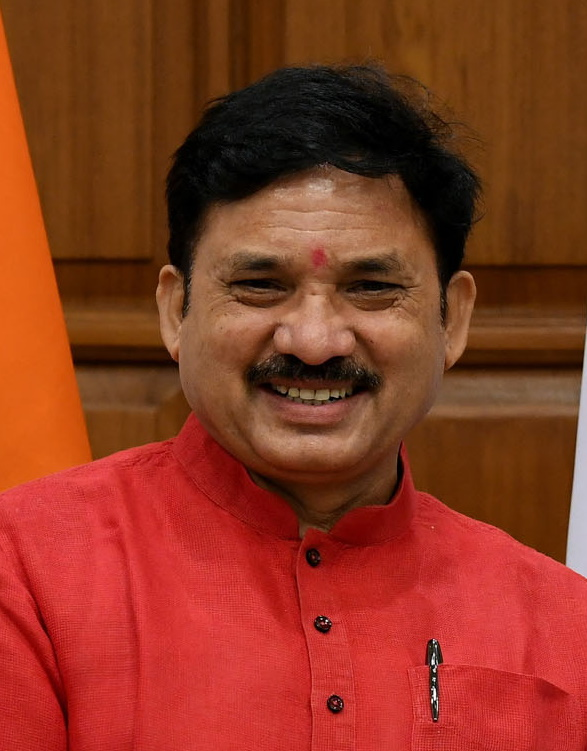
- Incumbent Devusinh Chauhan
- Party: Bharatiya Janata Party
- Elected year: 2024

Kheda is one of the 26 Lok Sabha (parliamentary) constituencies in Gujarat, India.

== Vidhan Sabha segments ==
Presently, Kheda Lok Sabha constituency comprises seven Vidhan Sabha (legislative assembly) segments. These are:

Constituency number	Name	Reserved for (SC/ST/None)	District	Party	2024 Lead
57	Daskroi	None	Ahmedabad	BJP	BJP
58	Dholka	None	Ahmedabad	BJP	BJP
115	Matar	None	Kheda	BJP	BJP
116	Nadiad	None	Kheda	BJP	BJP
117	Mehmedabad	None	Kheda	BJP	BJP
118	Mahudha	None	Kheda	BJP	BJP
120	Kapadvanj	None	Kheda	BJP	BJP

== Members of Lok Sabha ==
Year	Winner	Party
1952 (Note: 2-member constituency)	Maniben Patel	Indian National Congress
1952	Fulsinhjee Dabhi	Indian National Congress
1957	Thakore Fatehsinhji Dabhi	Swatantra Party
1962	Pravinsinh Solanki	Indian National Congress
1967	Pravinsinh Solanki	Indian National Congress
1971	Dharmsinh Desai	Indian National Congress
1977	Dharmsinh Desai	Indian National Congress
1980	Ajitsinh Dabhi	Indian National Congress (I)
1984	Ajitsinh Dabhi	Indian National Congress
1989	Prabhatsinh Chauhan	Janata Dal
1991	Khushiram Jeswani	Bharatiya Janata Party
1996	Dinsha Patel	Indian National Congress
1998	Dinsha Patel	Indian National Congress
1999	Dinsha Patel	Indian National Congress
2004	Dinsha Patel	Indian National Congress
2009	Dinsha Patel	Indian National Congress
2014	Devusinh Chauhan	Bharatiya Janata Party
2019	Devusinh Chauhan	Bharatiya Janata Party
2024	Devusinh Chauhan	Bharatiya Janata Party

== Election results ==
=== General election 2024 ===
2024 Indian general election: Kheda
Party	Candidate	Votes	%	±%
BJP	Devusinh Chauhan	744,435	63.31	▼1.73
INC	Kalusinh Dabhi	3,86,677	32.88	▲1.26
NOTA	None of the Above	18,824	1.60	▼0.06
BSP	Bhailalbhai Kalubhai Pandav	6,152	0.52	N/A
IND	Sodha Sanjaykumar Parvatsinh	6,139	0.52	N/A
Majority		3,57,758	30.43	▼2.99
Turnout		11,79,041	58.71	▼2.33
BJP hold		Swing		

=== General election 2019 ===
2019 Indian general elections: Kheda
Party	Candidate	Votes	%	±%
BJP	Devusinh Chauhan	714,572	65.04	+5.60
INC	Bimal Shah	3,47,427	31.62	−3.46
NOTA	None of the Above	18,277	1.66	+1.53
Majority		3,67,145	33.42	+9.06
Turnout		11,01,173	61.04	+1.18
BJP hold		Swing		

=== General election 2014 ===
2014 Indian general elections: Kheda
Party	Candidate	Votes	%	±%
BJP	Devusinh Chauhan	568,235	59.44	+24.36
INC	Dinsha Patel	3,35,334	35.08	−12.04
Independent	Roshan Shah	50,004	2.78	−−−
NOTA	None of the Above	2,333	0.13	−−−
Majority		2,32,901	24.36	+24.22
Turnout		9,57,464	59.86	+18.28
BJP gain from INC		Swing		

=== General election 2009 ===
2009 Indian general elections: Kheda
Party	Candidate	Votes	%	±%
INC	Dinsha Patel	283,780	47.12	
BJP	Devusinh Chauhan	2,83,059	46.98	
Independent	Taufik Husen Shekh	13,840	2.30	
Majority		721	0.14	
Turnout		6,02,663	41.60	
INC hold		Swing		

=== 1957 elections ===
- Dabhi Thakorshri Fatesinhji Ratansinhji (IND / Swatantra) : 127,646
- Dabhi Fulsinhji Bharatsinhji (Congress) : 107,135

=== 1984 elections ===
- Ajitsinh Fulsinhji Dyabhai (Congress-Indira) : 292,019 votes
- Satyam Patel (Lok Dal) : 144,586

== See also ==
- Kheda district
- List of constituencies of the Lok Sabha
