= Bharat Pandya =

Indian politician

Member of Gujarat Legislative Assembly
- In office 1998–2007
- Preceded by: Dilip Parikh
- Succeeded by: Ranchhodbhai Mer
- Constituency: Dhandhuka

Personal details
- Born: Bharat Pandya
- Party: Bharatiya Janata Party

Bharat Pandya is an Indian politician. He was elected to the Gujarat Legislative Assembly from Dhandhuka in the 2002 Gujarat Legislative Assembly election as a member of the Bharatiya Janata Party. He defeated then Chief Minister of Gujarat Dilip Parikh.
