= Bareja (village) =

- Town
- Location in Ahmedabad, Gujarat, India Bareja (Gujarat) Bareja (India)
- Coordinates: 22°51′N 72°35′E
- Country: India
- State: Gujarat
- District: Ahmedabad
- Taluka: Daskroi

Government
  - Type: Nagar Palika
  - Body: Ahmedabad Municipal Corporation

Languages
  - Official: Gujarati, Hindi, English
- Time zone: UTC+5:30 (IST)
- PIN: 382425
- Telephone code: 91-2718
- Vehicle registration: GJ-01-XX-XXXX (Former), GJ-27-XX-XXXX(Current)
- Lok Sabha constituency: Ahmedabad
- Civic agency: Bareja Nagarpalika
- Website: ahmedabad.nic.in/public-utility/bareja-nagarpalika/

Bareja is a town in the Daskroi taluka, Ahmedabad District located about 20 km from Ahmedabad City, India.

== History ==
Gandhi stopped in Bareja during the Salt March, which began in the nearby Ahmedabad suburb of Sabarmati Ashram. It was his second stop on the march, and he gave a short speech before continuing on towards Dandi.
