= Jaysinhji Chauhan =

Indian politician

Member of Parliament, Lok Sabha
- In office 1996-1999
- Preceded by: Gabhaji Mangaji Thakor
- Succeeded by: Shankersinh Vaghela
- Constituency: Kapadvanj, Gujarat

Personal details
- Born: 27 November 1952 (age 73)
- Party: Bharatiya Janata Party
- Spouse: Kantaben Jaysinhji

Jaysinhji Mansinhji Chauhan was an Indian politician. He was elected to the Lok Sabha, the lower house of the Parliament of India as a member of the Bharatiya Janata Party.
