= Rajeshkumar Zala =

Indian politician

Rajeshkumar Maganbhai Zala (born 1987) is an Indian politician from Gujarat. He is a member of the Gujarat Legislative Assembly from Kapadvanj Assembly constituency in Kheda district. He won the 2022 Gujarat Legislative Assembly election representing the Bharatiya Janata Party.

== Early life and education ==
Zala is from Kapadvanj, Kheda district, Gujarat. He is the son of Maganbhai Gokalbhai Zala. He studied Class 12 at Saraswati Mandir, Tal Kadlal, Kheda district and passed the examinations in 2009. Later, he discontinued his studies.

== Career ==
Zala won from Kapadvanj Assembly constituency representing the Bharatiya Janata Party in the 2022 Gujarat Legislative Assembly election. He polled 112,036 votes and defeated his nearest rival, Kalabhai Dabhi of the Indian National Congress, by a margin of 31,878 votes.
