= Dhandhuka Assembly constituency =

Legislative Assembly constituency in Gujarat State, India

Coordinates: 22.38°N 71.98°E

Dhandhuka
- Constituency No. 59 for the Gujarat Legislative Assembly

Constituency details
- Country: India
- Region: Western India
- State: Gujarat
- District: Ahmedabad
- Lok Sabha constituency: Surendranagar
- Established: 1972
- Total electors: 274,194
- Reservation: None

Member of Legislative Assembly
- 15th Gujarat Legislative Assembly
- Incumbent Kalubhai Rupabhai Dabhi
- Party: Bharatiya Janata Party
- Elected year: 2022

Dhandhuka is one of the 182 Legislative Assembly constituencies of Gujarat state in India. It is part of Ahmedabad district.

== List of segments ==
This assembly seat represents the following segments,

1. Dhandhuka Taluka
2. Ranpur Taluka
3. Barwala Taluka
4. Dholera taluka

== Members of Legislative Assembly ==
Year	Winner Candidate	Votes	Party
1980	Natvarlal Shah	15095	Indian National Congress
1985	Natvarlal Shah	15053	Indian National Congress
1990	Dilip Parikh	5486	Bharatiya Janata Party
1995	Dilip Parikh	8043	Bharatiya Janata Party
1998	Bharat Pandya	15307	Bharatiya Janata Party
2002	Bharat Pandya	3,882	Bharatiya Janata Party
2007	Ranchhodbhai Mer	6,717	Bharatiya Janata Party
2012	Laljibhai Kolipatel	28,277	Bharatiya Janata Party
2017	Rajesh Gohil	5,920	Indian National Congress
2022	Kalubhai Rupabhai Dabhi	91,528	Bharatiya Janata Party

== Election results ==
=== 2022 ===
Gujarat Assembly election, 2022:Dhandhuka Assembly constituency
Party	Candidate	Votes	%	±%
BJP	Kalubhai Rupabhai Dabhi	91,528	55.1	
INC	Harpalsinh Chudasama	57,202	34.44	
AAP	Chandubhai Mansangbhai Bamroliya	9,866	5.94	
BSP	Jiniya Parvinbhai Mohanbhai	993	0.6	
BTP	Gohel Hareshkumar Arvindbhai	648	0.39	
Jana Sewa Driver Party	Ashokbhai V. Patel	634	0.38	
CPI(M)	Gorawaha Roshaniben Prithviraj	489	0.29	
Vyavastha Parivartan Party	Ravjibhai Vallabhbhai Kaliya	382	0.23	
RRP	Tulashibhai Puranbhai Solanki	370	0.22	N/A
NOTA	None of the above	2,893	1.74	
Majority		34,326	20.66	
Turnout				
Registered electors		269,869		

=== 2017 ===
Gujarat Assembly Election, 2017: Dhandhuka
Party	Candidate	Votes	%	±%
INC	Rajesh Gohil	67,477	47.85	+12.23
BJP	Kalubhai Dabhi	61,557	43.65	−12.42
CPI(M)	Vinodbhai Gorahva	1,953	1.48	New
Majority		5,920	4.2	−9.41
Turnout		1,41,019	57.45	−7.16
BJP hold		Swing		

=== 2012 ===
Gujarat Assembly Election, 2012
Party	Candidate	Votes	%	±%
BJP	Laljibhai Chaturbhai Kolipatel	77,573	56.07	+14.55
INC	M M Shah	49,296	35.63	New
Majority		28,277	20.44	+13.51
Turnout		1,38,362		
BJP gain from		Swing		

=== 2007 ===
Gujarat Assembly Election, 2007
Party	Candidate	Votes	%	±%
Independent	Ranchhodbhai Mer	46,954	48.45	New
BJP	Bharat Pandya	40,237	41.52	−6.6
BSP	Babbhai Khachar	3,541	3.65	New
Majority		6,717	6.93	+2.69
Turnout		96,908		
Independent gain from BJP		Swing		

=== 2002 ===
Gujarat Assembly Election, 2002
Party	Candidate	Votes	%	±%
BJP	Bharat Pandya	44,070	48.12	
INC	Dilip Parikh	40,188	43.88	
Independent	Bhavubhai Rathod	4,079	4.45	
Majority		3,882	4.24	
Turnout		1,01,733	62.61	
BJP hold		Swing		

== See also ==
- List of constituencies of the Gujarat Legislative Assembly
- Ahmedabad district
