= Bayad Assembly constituency =

Legislative Assembly constituency in Gujarat State, India

Coordinates: 23.23°N 73.22°E

Bayad
- Constituency No. 32 for the Gujarat Legislative Assembly

Constituency details
- Country: India
- Region: Western India
- State: Gujarat
- District: Aravalli
- Lok Sabha constituency: Sabarkantha
- Established: 1951
- Total electors: 246,019
- Reservation: None

Member of Legislative Assembly
- 15th Gujarat Legislative Assembly
- Incumbent Dhavalsinh Zala
- Party: Independent
- Elected year: 2022

Bayad is one of the 182 Legislative Assembly constituencies of Gujarat state in India.

It is part of Aravalli district.

== List of segments ==
This assembly seat represents the following segments:

1. Bayad Taluka30
2. Malpur Taluka8

== Members of Legislative Assembly ==
- 1951 (Bombay State) - Patel Gopaldas Venidas, Indian National Congress
- 1957 (Bombay State) - Lalsinh Kishorsinh Rahevar, Independent
- 1962 - Lalsinh Kishorsinh Rahevar, Swatantra Party
- 1967 - Lalsinh Kishorsinh Rahevar, Swatantra Party
- 1972 - Lalsinh Kishorsinh Rahevar, Indian National Congress (O)
- 1975 - Lalsinh Kishorsinh Rahevar, Indian National Congress (O)
- 1980 - Ramsinh Rupsinh Solanki, Indian National Congress (I)
- 1985 - Ramsinh Rupsinh Solanki, Independent
- 1990 - Chandrabhansinh Mulsinh Solanki, Bharatiya Janata Party
- 1995 - Ramsinh Rupsinh Solanki, Indian National Congress
- 1998 - Patel Mahendrabhai Somabhai, Bharatiya Janata Party
- 2002 - Ramsinh Rupsinh Solanki, Indian National Congress
- 2007 - Udesinh Punjaji Zala, Bharatiya Janata Party
- 2012 - Mahendrasinh Vaghela, Indian National Congress

Year	Member	Picture	Party
2017	Dhavalsinh Zala		Indian National Congress
2019 (By Poll)	Patel Jashubhai Shivabhai		Indian National Congress
2022	Dhavalsinh Zala		Independent

== Election results ==
=== 2022 ===
Gujarat Assembly election, 2022:Bayad Assembly constituency
Party	Candidate	Votes	%	±%
Independent	Dhavalsinh Narendrasinh Zala	67078	38.87	
BJP	Bhikhiben Girvatsinh Parmar	61260	35.5	
INC	Mahendrasinh Shankarsinh Vaghela	29874	17.31	
AAP	Chunibhai Bababhai Patel	5947	3.45	
NOTA	None of the above	2304	1.34	
Majority		5,818	3.37	
Turnout				
Registered electors		245,558		
Independent gain from INC		Swing		

=== 2019 ===
By-election, 2019: Bayad
Party	Candidate	Votes	%	±%
INC	Jashubhai Patel	65,597	46.46	
BJP	Dhavalsingh Narendrasinh Zala	64,854	45.93	
NCP	Chauhan Dolatsinh Jagatsinh	4,065	2.88	
Majority		743	0.53	
Turnout		1,41,212	60.98	
INC hold		Swing		

=== 2017 ===
2017 Gujarat Legislative Assembly election: Bayad
Party	Candidate	Votes	%	±%
INC	Dhavalsinh Narendrasinh Zala	79,556	50.39	
BJP	Adesinh Chauhan	71,655	45.39	
Majority			5.00	
Turnout		1,57,873	70.71	
INC hold		Swing		

=== 2012 ===
2012 Gujarat Legislative Assembly election: Bayad
Party	Candidate	Votes	%	±%
INC	Mahendrasinh Vaghela	74,746	48.46	
BJP	Udesinh Zala	38,723	25.14	
Majority		35,923	23.32	
Turnout		1,54,050	76.72	
INC gain from BJP		Swing		

== See also ==
- List of constituencies of the Gujarat Legislative Assembly
- Aravalli district
