= Bimal Shah =

Indian politician

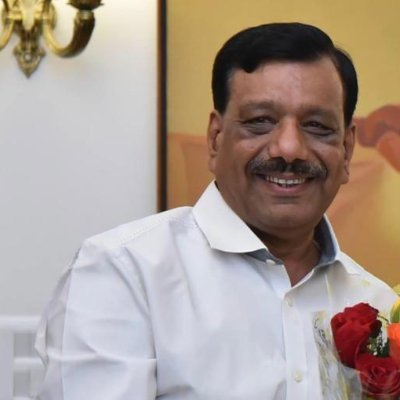

Vice President of Gujarat Pradesh Congress Committee
- Incumbent
- Assumed office 25 March 2022

Personal details
- Born: Bimal Shah; 1961 (age 64–65)
- Children: Vijay Shah

Bimal Shah is an Indian politician. He was elected to the Gujarat Legislative Assembly from Kapadvanj in the 1998 and 2002 Gujarat Legislative Assembly election as a member of the Bharatiya Janata Party. He was the Transport Minister in Keshubhai Patel cabinet from 1999 to 2001. He joined Indian National Congress in January 2019.
