= Bhat, Daskroi =

Bhat
- Village
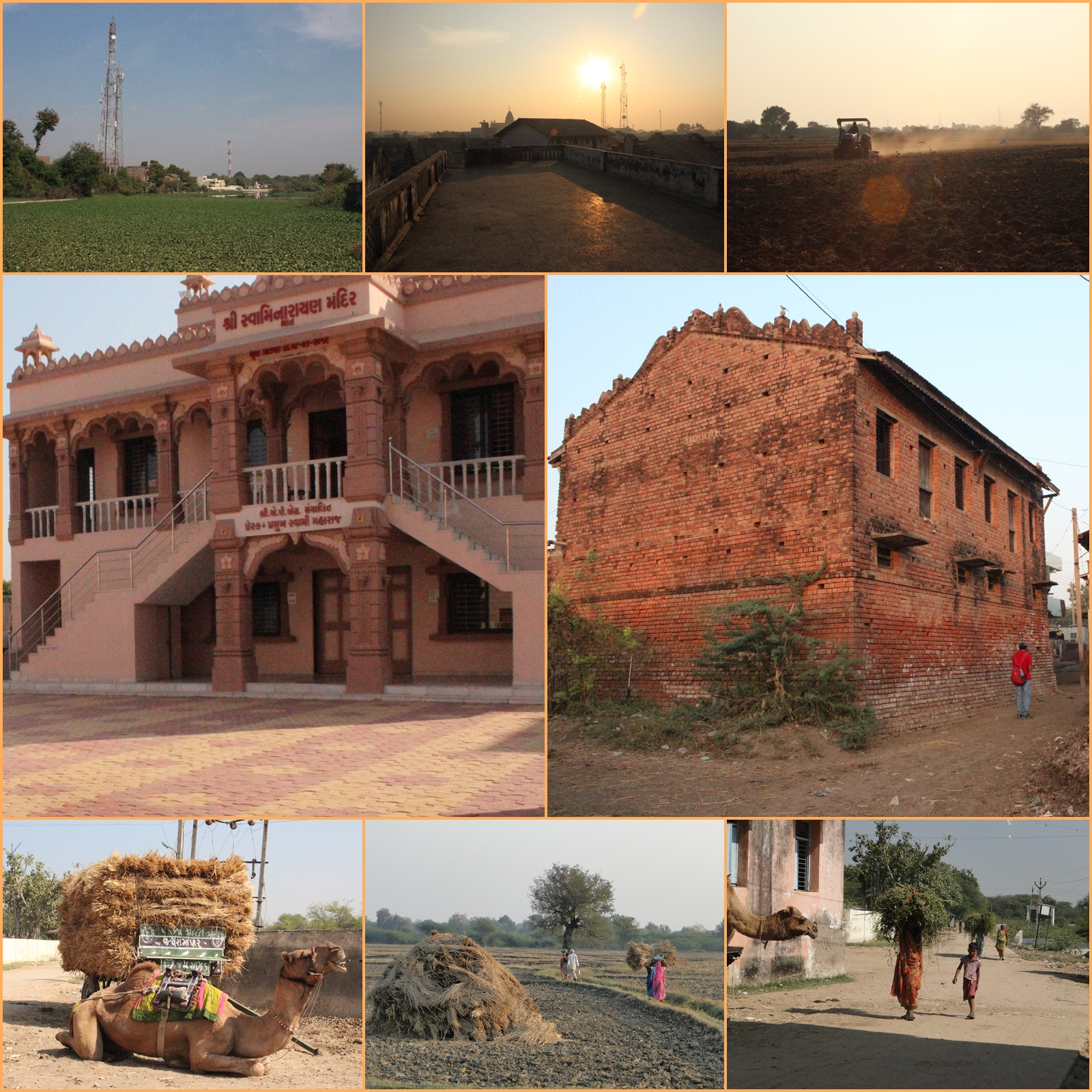
- Clockwise from topː Moti Talav, Morning View, Farm View, Swaminarayan Temple, Building at Rabari Vas and different areas
- Nickname: Bhat Gam
- Location in Gujarat, India Bhat (India)
- Coordinates: 22°52′35″N 72°27′50″E
- Country: India
- State: Gujarat
- District: Ahmedabad

Government
  - Type: Gram Panchayat
  - Body: Gram Panchayat
- Elevation: 33 m (108 ft)

Population (2011)
  - Total: 5,858

Languages
  - Official: Gujarati, Hindi, English
- Time zone: UTC+5:30 (IST)
- PIN: 382210
- Vehicle registration: GJ-1, GJ-27

Bhat ([ˈbhaːt]) is a village in Daskroi Taluka in Ahmedabad district of Gujarat State, India. Bhat is located near the bank of the Sabarmati River, 24 km towards west from District headquarters Ahmedabad, 5 km from Daskroi and 49 km from State capital Gandhinagar.

== Geography ==
Bhat lies at 22.87°N 72.46°E in western India at 33 metres (107 ft) above sea level near the bank of the Sabarmati River in north-central Gujarat. According to the Bureau of Indian Standards, the village falls under seismic zone 3, in a scale of 2 to 5 (in order of increasing vulnerability to earthquakes).

The south-west monsoon winds bring humid climate to Bhat from mid-June to mid-September. The average rainfall is 932 mm. The highest temperature recorded is 47 °C and the lowest is 5 °C.

=== Holi Dhal ===
Holi Dhal is a prominent town square in Bhat, Daskroi village. It is surrounded by historical structures. It is a vegetable market in the morning, a cloth market in the noon and the street food market at night.

It is named after ritual ceremony of Holika Dahan. In the festival of Holi villagers celebrates the death of Holika to save Prahlad at this place so now it is known as Holi Dhal. In olden days, people use to contribute a piece of wood for Holika bonfire. This bustling open square near the center of the village functions as a vegetable market in the morning and evening, and a cloth market in the afternoon. It is most famous, however, for its food stalls that start to emerge around 7:30 in the evening and continue till late night, with various local street snacks. Some heritage structures are in vicinity. The memorial temple of Lord Shiva known as Dudheshwar Mahadev is situated in Holi Dhal. It was the first pol (housing cluster) of Bhat. Prajapati and Patels settled here around the 1450s. There is one temple besides pol, Dudheshwar Mahadev temple.

=== Garba Chowk ===
Garba Chowk
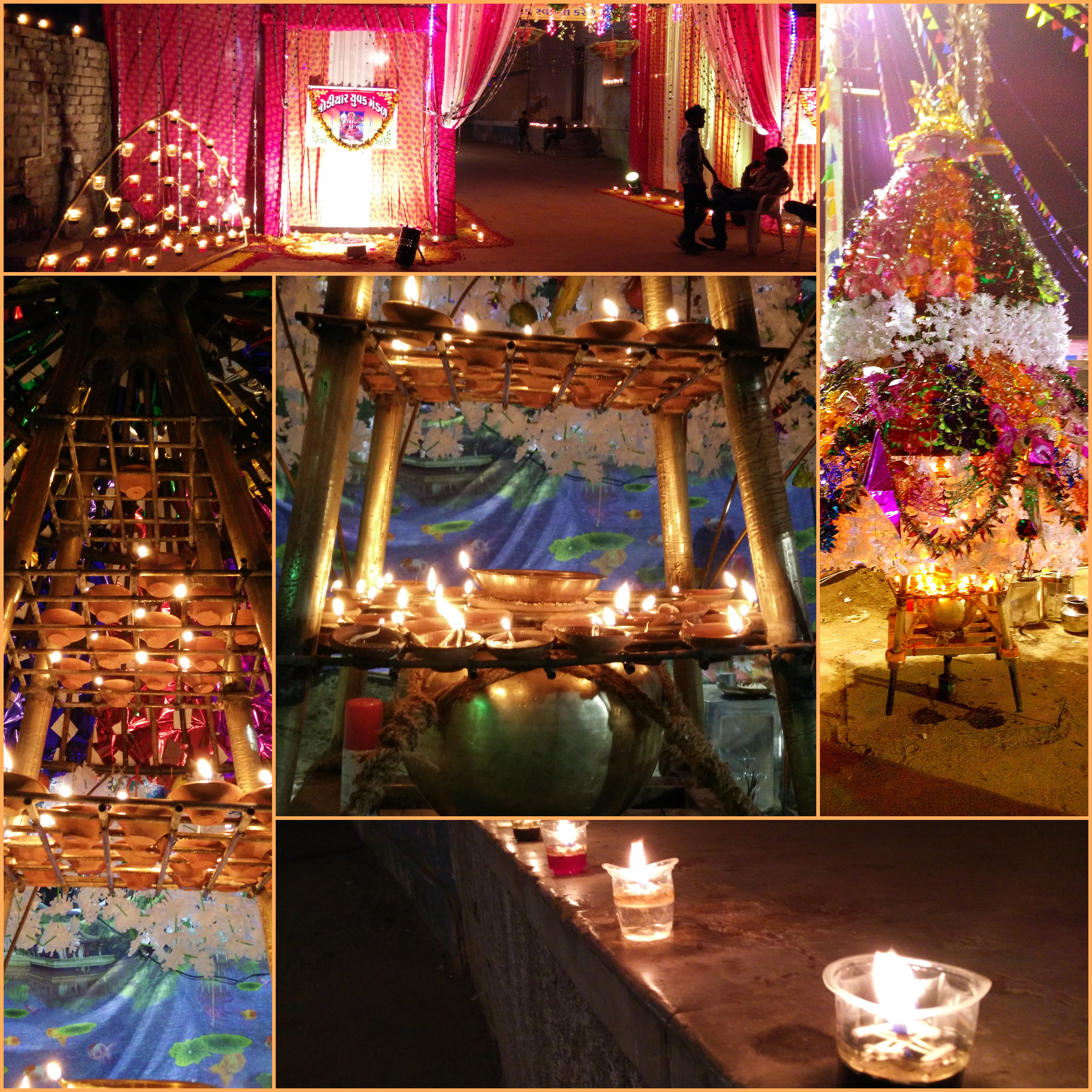
- During Garba at Night
- Interactive map of Garba Chowk
- Addresses: within Bhat village
- Location: Bhat, Ahmedabad, Gujarat, India
- Coordinates: 22°52′34″N 72°27′47″E

Garba Chowk is a second prominent town square in Bhat, Daskroi village. The Chowk is hardscapes suitable for open markets, music concerts, political rallies, and other events. Being centrally located, chowk is surrounded by small shops such as vegetable shop, Grocery shop, and clothing stores.

Place is as hub for playing Garba across the village, Nine nights of Navaratri are celebrated with people performing Garba, the most popular folk dance of Gujarat. In the village there is a ritual to perform garba from the day of Bestu Varas to the day of Dev Diwali. Villagers perform Garba, start to emerge around 8:00 in the evening and continue till late night.

== Demographics ==
As per Census 2011, The Bhat village had population of 5858 of which 3037 are males while 2821 are females. In Bhat village population of children with age 0–6 is 761 which makes up 12.99% of total population of village. Average Sex Ratio of Bhat village is 929 which is higher than Gujarat state average of 919. Child Sex Ratio for the Bhat as per census is 829, lower than Gujarat average of 890. Lakkadiya Hanuman Temple, also known as Hanuman ji Mandir, is the place of worship in the village.

=== Faliyas ===
A faliyu (pronounced phaliyum, Gujarati: ફળિયું) or faliya and fali, also known as nivas, is a housing cluster which comprises many families of a particular group, linked by caste, profession, or religion. This is a list of faliya in Bhat, Daskroi, Gujarat, India.

The list of Faliyas in Bhat is given below:

1. GARBA CHOWK (THAKOR VAS)
2. Mukhi vash
3. Prajapati Nivas
4. Patel's Faliyu
5. Patel's Khadki
6. Raval Vas
7. Sharma Nivas
8. Thakor Vas
9. Rabari Vas
10. Bhampol
11. Mahadev Khadaki
12. Suthar Vas
13. Darji Vas
14. Rohit Vas

== Transportation ==
The Gujarat State Road Transport Corporation runs a circular bus service along the Sardar Patel Ring Road from Sarkhej – Dholka Road on an hourly basis. State Highway 4, linking Vataman to Ahmedabad, passes through Bhat and connects it with Dholka, Sarkhej, Ahmedabad and Gandhinagar. The National Highway 8A also links Bhat to Ahmedabad and Gandhinagar.

== Education ==
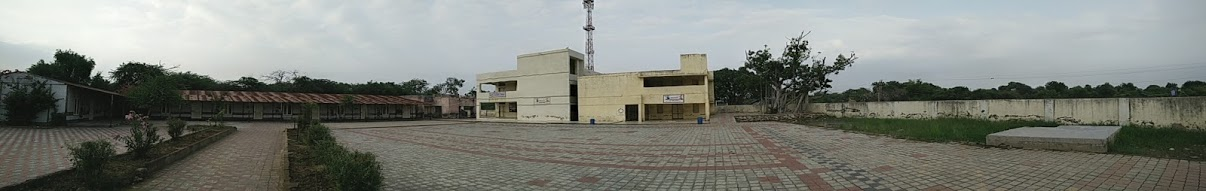
Bhat Primary School Panorama View

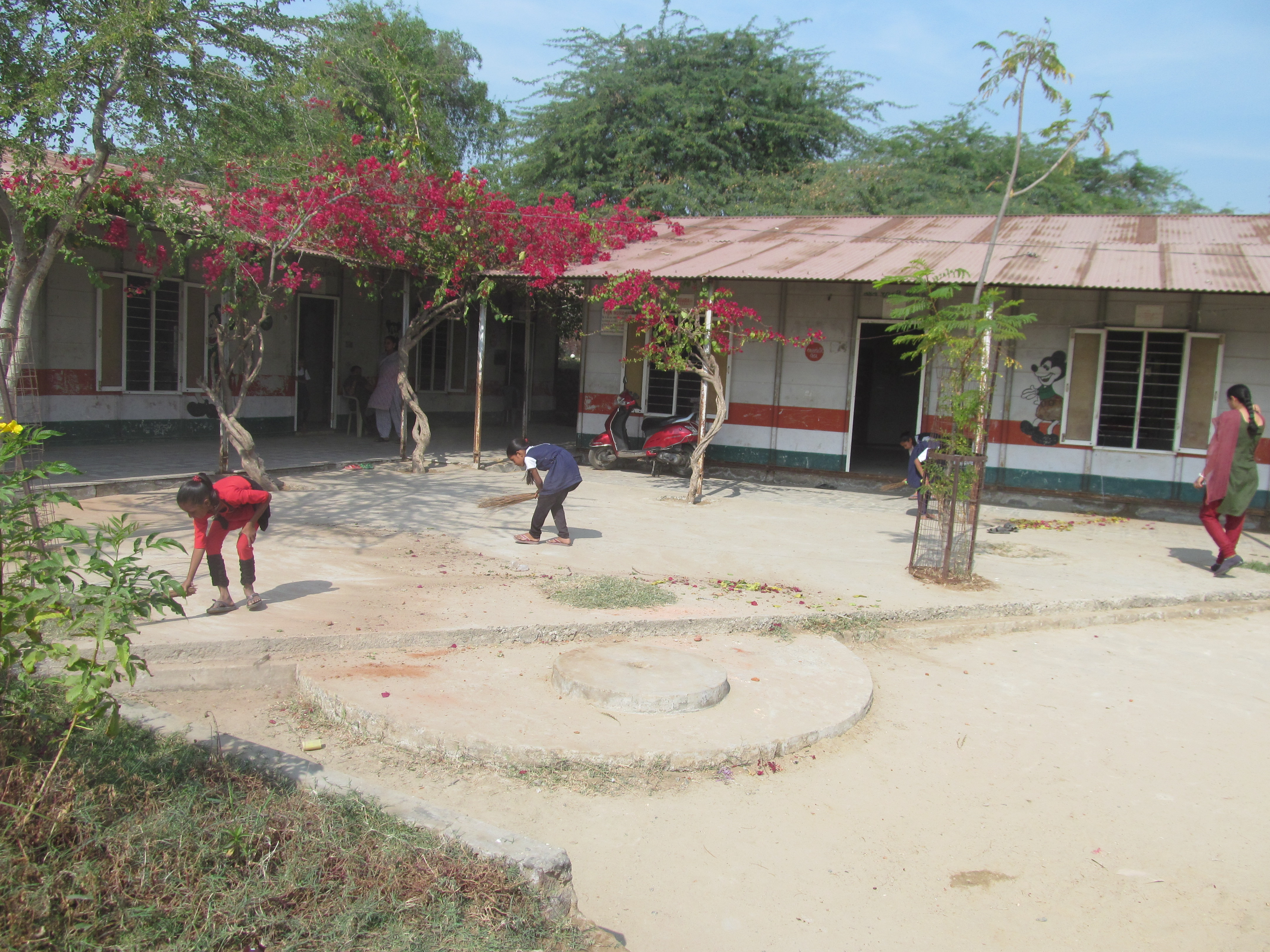
Bhat Primary School Campus

Bhat village has lower literacy rate compared to Gujarat. In 2011, literacy rate of Bhat village was 74.08% compared to 78.03% of Gujarat. In Bhat Male literacy stands at 84.05% while female literacy rate was 63.53%. There is two primary government schools named: Bhat Primary School and Rampura Primary School.

== Economy ==
In Bhat village out of total population, 2055 were engaged in work activities. 88.81% of workers describe their work as Main Work (Employment or Earning more than 6 Months) while 11.19% were involved in Marginal activity providing livelihood for less than 6 months. Of 2055 workers engaged in Main Work, 449 were cultivators (owner or co-owner) while 788 were Agricultural labourer.
