= Babubhai Patel (politician) =

Indian politician

MLA of Gujarat
- Incumbent
- Assumed office 2007-2012, 2012-2017, 2017-2022, 2022- Present
- Constituency: Daskroi

Personal details
- Party: Bharatiya Janata Party

Babubhai Jamnadas Patel, commonly referred to as Babubhai Patel, is a BJP politician and has been elected a member of Gujarat Legislative Assembly from Daskroi constituency in Ahmedabad district of Gujarat in 2007, 2012, 2017 and 2022 state assembly elections.
