= Kapadvanj Assembly constituency =

Legislative Assembly constituency in Gujarat State, India

Coordinates: 23.02°N 73.07°E

Kapadvanj
- Constituency No. 120 for the Gujarat Legislative Assembly

Constituency details
- Country: India
- Region: Western India
- State: Gujarat
- District: Kheda
- Lok Sabha constituency: Kheda
- Total electors: 299,625
- Reservation: None

Member of Legislative Assembly
- 15th Gujarat Legislative Assembly
- Incumbent Rajeshkumar Maganbhai Zala
- Party: Bharatiya Janata Party
- Elected year: 2022

Kapadvanj is one of the 182 Legislative Assembly constituencies of Gujarat state in India. It is part of Kheda district.

== List of segments ==
This assembly seat represents the following segments :

1. Kapadvanj Taluka (Part) Villages – Aboch, Abvel, Aghatna Muvada, Alampur, Alawa, Ambaliyara, Antroli, Atarsumba, Bavano Math, Betawada, Bhailakui, Bhoja Na Muvada, Bhungaliya, Bobha, Dadana Muvada, Dahiyap, Dana, Dandiyapur, Dasalvada, Deradi Pavathi, Dhuliya Vasna, Fatiyabad, Fuljina Muvada, Hamirpura, Jagdupur, Jambudi, Jaloya, Kabhaina Muvada, Kalaji, Kapadvanj (M), Karkariya, Kevadiya, Khanpur, Kosam, Kotwalna Muvada, Ladujina Muvada, Lal Mandva, Lalpur, Lalpur (Nirmali), Mahamadpura, Mirapur, Moti Zer, Nani Zer, Narshipur, Nathana Muvada, Navagam, Nikol, Nirmali, Palaiya, Pirojpur, Punadra, Rampura (Sundervadi), Rozavada, Salod, Shihora, Singali, Singpur, Sorna, Sultanpur (Taiyabpur), Taiyabpur, Talpoda, Telnar, Thunchal, Torna, Ukardina Muvada, Vadali, Vaghajipur, Vaghavat, Vasna, Vavna Muvada, Vyasjina Muvada, Vyas Vasna, Zanda
2. Kathlal Taluka – Entire taluka except villages – Charan Nikol, Fagvel, Fulchhatrapura, Ladvel, Lasundra, Laxmanpura, Porda Fagvel, Sikandar Porda, Vishvnathpura
3. Mahudha Taluka (Part) Village – Khandivav

== Members of Legislative Assembly ==
Year	Member	Picture	Party
1980	Budhaji Chuhan		Indian National Congress
1985	Budhaji Chuhan		Indian National Congress
1990	Ratansinh Rathod		Indian National Congress
1995	Manibhai Devjibhai Patel		Bharatiya Janata Party
1998	Bimal Shah		Bharatiya Janata Party
2002	Bimal Shah		Bharatiya Janata Party
2007	Manibhai Devjibhai Patel		Indian National Congress
2012	Shankersinh Vaghela		Indian National Congress
2017	Dabhi Kalabhai Raijibhai		Indian National Congress
2022	Rajeshkumar Maganbhai Zala		Bharatiya Janata Party

== Election results ==
=== 2022 ===
Gujarat Assembly election, 2022:Kapadvanj Assembly constituency
Party	Candidate	Votes	%	±%
BJP	Rajeshkumar Zala	112,036	53.97	
INC	Kalabhai Raijibhai Dabhi	80,158	38.62	
AAP	Manubhai Patel	8,901	4.29	
NOTA	None of the above	3,223	1.55	
Majority			15.35	
Turnout				
Registered electors		295,584		
BJP gain from INC		Swing		

=== 2017 ===
Gujarat Legislative Assembly Election, 2017: Kapadvanj
Party	Candidate	Votes	%	±%
INC	Kalabhai Dabhi	85,195	42.67	−5.89
BJP	Kanubhai Dabhi	57,969	29.04	−15.91
Independent	Bimal Shah	46,928	23.51	New
Majority		27,226	13.63	+10.02
Turnout		1,99,642	73.21	−2.04
INC hold		Swing		

=== 2012 ===
Gujarat Assembly Election, 2012: Kapadvanj
Party	Candidate	Votes	%	±%
INC	Shankersinh Vaghela	88641	48.56	
BJP	Kanubhai Dabhi	82,044	44.95	
Majority		6,597	3.61	
Turnout		182,529	75.25	
INC hold		Swing		

== See also ==
- List of constituencies of Gujarat Legislative Assembly
- Gujarat Legislative Assembly
