= Shantilal Patel =

Indian politician

Personal details
- Born: 8 April 1938; Ranjit Nagar, Panchmahal, Gujarat
- Died: 25 May 2011 (aged 73); Vadodara, Gujarat
- Political party: Indian National Congress
- Spouse: Sumitraben (m. 1968; died 2011)
- Children: Jayesh Shantilal patel Mehul shantilal Patel

Shantilal Purshottamdas Patel (8 April 1938 – 25 May 2011) was an Indian politician from Gujarat. He served as deputy minister in the Ministry of Commerce in Chandra Shekhar cabinet. He was member of Lok Sabha from Godhra in Gujarat, India.

He was elected to 8th, 9th, 11th and 12th Lok Sabha from Godhra. Patel died on 25 May 2011, in Vadodara, Gujarat, at the age of 73.

== Positions held ==
- 1975–1988 Elected as Member, Gujarat Legislative Assembly
- 1977–1988 Vice President, Janata Party Gujarat
- 1988–1989 Member of Parliament, 8th Lok Sabha
- 1989–1991 Member of Parliament, 9th Lok Sabha (2nd term)
- 1989–1991 General Secretary, Janata Dal (S)
- 1990–1991 Deputy Minister, Commerce Ministry
- 1992 General Secretary, Pradesh Congress Committee (Indira), Gujarat
- 1996–1998 Member of Parliament, 11th Lok Sabha (3rd term)
- 1998–1999 Member of Parliament, 12th Lok Sabha (4th term)

== Books ==
- Panchmahal Darshan
- Sahakardeep
- Mahak (biography of Maneklal Gandhi)
