= Dinsha Patel =

Indian politician

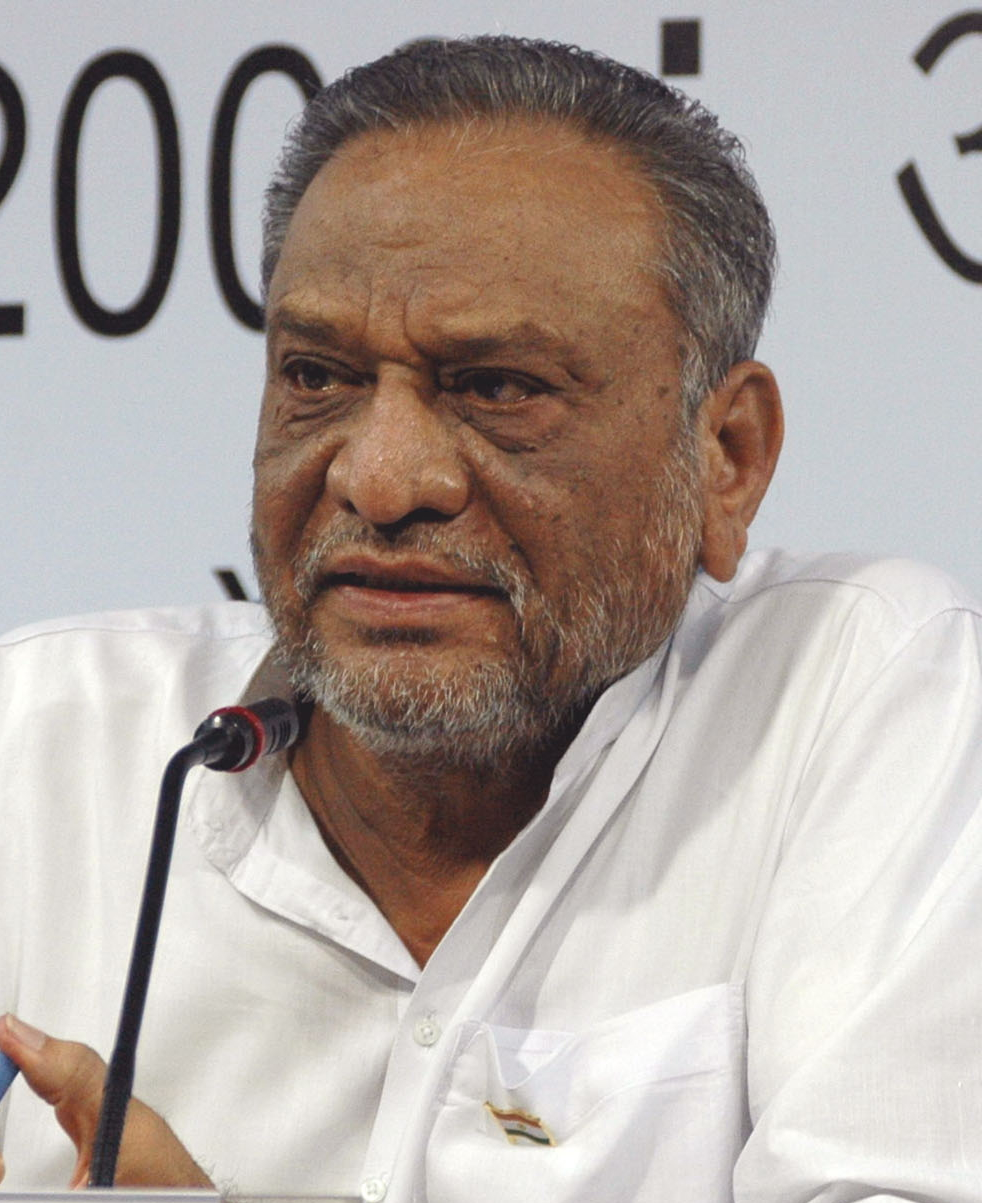

Union Minister of Mines
- In office 19 January 2011 – 25 May 2014; Minister of State (Independent Charge) until 28 October 2012
- Prime Minister: Manmohan Singh
- Preceded by: Bijoy Krishna Handique
- Succeeded by: Piyush Goyal

Union Minister of State (Independent Charge) of Micro, Small and Medium Enterprises
- In office 28 May 2009 – 19 January 2011
- Prime Minister: Manmohan Singh
- Preceded by: Mahaveer Prasad
- Succeeded by: Virbhadra Singh

Union Minister of State for Petroleum and Natural Gas
- In office 29 January 2006 – 22 May 2009
- Prime Minister: Manmohan Singh
- Minister: Murli Deora
- Preceded by: E. V. K. S. Elangovan
- Succeeded by: Jitin Prasada

Member of Parliament, Lok Sabha
- In office 16 May 1996 – 26 May 2014
- Preceded by: Khushiram Jeswani
- Succeeded by: Devusinh Chauhan
- Constituency: Kheda

Personal details
- Born: 25 May 1937 (age 89) Baroda, Gujarat
- Party: Indian National Congress
- Spouse: Kundanben Dinsha Patel

Dinsha Jhaverbhai Patel (born 25 May 1937) is an Indian National Congress politician who was a member of the 15th Lok Sabha of India.

He represented the Kheda constituency of Gujarat and is a member of the Indian National Congress. He was the Union Cabinet Minister, Mines. He was the Minister of State in the Ministry of Mines (Independent Charge) from 19 Jan 2011 to 27 Sep 2012. He was also a Minister of State in the Ministry of Micro, Small and Medium Enterprises (Independent Charge) from May 2009 to 18 Jan 2011 and was a Minister of State in the Ministry of Petroleum and Natural Gas from 2006 to 2009. On 28 October 2012 he was given the responsibilities of Union Cabinet Minister, Mines.

== Contesting against Modi ==
Patel was chosen by the Indian National Congress to contest against Narendra Modi on the Maninagar constituency in the 2007 Gujarat Legislative Assembly election.

His selection was based on his clean image and his Patel community background. He was selected after congress could not find any suitable candidate to oppose Narendra Modi. He was also being projected as the future Chief Minister of Gujarat. He lost the elections by more than 86, 000 votes.

In the previous elections he lost the assembly elections in the Nadiad constituency against Pankaj Desai, however he has won the Parliament elections since 1975 from Nadiad.
