= Gamdi, Anand district =

Gamdi
- Census Town
- Country: India
- State: Gujarat
- District: Anand district

Languages
  - Official: Gujarati
- Time zone: UTC+5:30 (IST)

Gamdi is a Census town situated in Anand district of Gujarat, India.

== Geography ==
The total geographic area of the Gamdi town is 6 square kilometers which makes it the biggest census town by area in Anand district.

== Demographics ==
According to the 2011 Indian Census, Gamdi city consist of the total population of approximate 15,000 people. The literacy rate of Gamdi city is 87.60 percent, which is higher than Gujarat's literacy rate of 78.03 percent.
