= Dilip Parikh =

Indian politician and industrialist (1937–2019)

13th Chief Minister of Gujarat
- In office 28 October 1997 – 4 March 1998
- Preceded by: Shankersinh Vaghela
- Succeeded by: Keshubhai Patel

Minister of Industries in Government of Gujarat
- In office 1995–1997
- Chief Minister: Shankersinh Vaghela

MLA of Gujarat
- In office 1990–1998
- Constituency: Dhandhuka constituency

Personal details
- Born: 16 February 1937 Bombay, Bombay Province, British India
- Died: 25 October 2019 (aged 82) Ahmedabad, Gujarat, India
- Party: Bharatiya Janata Party (1995–1996); Rashtriya Janata Party (1996–1998)

Dilip Ramanbhai Parikh (16 February 1937 – 25 October 2019) was an Indian politician and industrialist. He was the 13th Chief Minister of Gujarat from 28 October 1997 to 4 March 1998. Dilip Parekh is also the most recent non BJP Chief Minister of Gujarat as of now. As BJP has been ruling the state ever since.

== Early life ==
Parikh was born in 1937 in Bombay (now Mumbai). He received BA in Economics from Elphinstone College, Bombay. He studied law as well. He had a plastic manufacturing business. He served as the President of Gujarat State Plastic Manufacturers' Association in 1973–74. In 1979, he led the association of plastic and rubber industries in the state. He served as the president of the Gujarat Chamber of Commerce and Industry in the 1980s.

== Political career ==
In 1990, Parikh entered politics and served as the Vice President of the State Committee of Bharatiya Janata Party (BJP). He contested and won 1990 and 1995 Gujarat legislative assembly elections from Dhandhuka constituency as a candidate of BJP.

BJP won majority in 1995 election and formed government headed by Chief Minister Keshubhai Patel. Patel resigned in October 1995 following revolt of his colleague Shankersinh Vaghela and consequently, Suresh Mehta was sworn in as the Chief Minister in October 1995 and he served until September 1996. Parikh was the minister of industries in the cabinet headed by Mehta.

In 1996, when Vaghela split the BJP and formed the Rashtriya Janata Party, he joined RJP which formed the minority government with support of the Indian National Congress (INC) and Vaghela became the Chief Minister on 23 October 1996. A year later INC threatened to withdraw its support on 20 October 1997. A week later the compromise was reached as a change of Chief Minister. Vaghela stepped down and Parikh was sworn in as a Chief Minister by governor Krishna Pal Singh in 1997.

In 182 members Gujarat Legislative Assembly, there were only 46 RJP members while there were 44 INC, 76 BJP and 15 Independents members. Thus minority government by outside support of the INC resulted in the instability. He submitted his resignation to Gujarat Governor Krishna Pal Singh and called for the fresh assembly election on 5 January 1998 but continued as a caretaker Chief Minister till 4 March 1998. He lost to the BJP candidate Bharat Pandya in Dhandhuka by a margin of over 15000 votes in 1998 Gujarat legislative assembly election while RJP won only four seats. BJP regained power with 117 seats out of 182 seats assembly. He later joined INC and afterwards retired from the politics.

He died on 25 October 2019 in Ahmedabad after a surgery following a fall a few days previous. His body was cremated at Thaltej.
