= Dhavalsinh Zala =

Indian Bharatiya Janata Party politician

Member of Gujarat Legislative Assembly
- In office 2022–Incumbent
- Constituency: Bayad

Personal details
- Born: Dhavalsinh Zala
- Party: Independent; Indian National Congress (formerly)
- Education: M.A.
- Alma mater: Gujarat University

Dhavalsinh Narendrasinh Zala is an independent Indian politician. He was elected to the Gujarat Legislative Assembly from Bayad in the 2017 Gujarat Legislative Assembly election as a member of the Indian National Congress and again elected after 2022 Gujarat Legislative Assembly election from the same constituency as an independent candidate.

== Biography ==
Dhavalsinh Zala belongs to the Koli community of Gujarat. Zala along with Alpesh Thakor quit Indian National Congress and was a member of the post 2019 Indian Rajya Sabha elections in Gujarat.

He is the Vice President of Gujarat Kshatriy Thakor Sena. He also plays the role of Thakor Sena spokesperson.

He again contested from Bayad in the by-poll held on 21 October 2019, where he lost to the Congress candidate. In the 2022 assembly elections, he was elected as an independent candidate from the Bayad assembly seat.
