= Gamdi, Ahmedabad district =

Gamdi
- Village
- Location in Gujarat, India Gamdi (India)
- Coordinates: 22.90843°N 72.69173°E
- Country: India
- State: Gujarat
- District: Ahmedabad District
- Elevation: 35 m (115 ft)

Population
  - Total: 1,321

Languages
  - Official: Gujarati (State), Hindi (Federal)
- Time zone: UTC+5:30 (IST)
- PIN: 382435
- Telephone code: 02717
- Vehicle registration: GJ
- Nearest cities: Mehmedabad, Ahmedabad, Kheda, Dholka
- Climate: Dry almost (Köppen)
- Website: gujaratindia.com

Gamdi is a village in Daskroi taluka in the Ahmedabad District of the Indian state of Gujarat. Nearby villages are Devdi, Geratpur, Ropda, Vinzol and Aslali. Gamdi's Postal Index Number code is 382435 and the postal head office is Nandej.

== See also ==
- Ahmedabad District on Government of Gujarat
