= Ajitsinh Dabhi =

Indian politician (1926–2008)

Member of Parliament, Lok Sabha
- In office 1977–1989
- Preceded by: Dharmsinh Desai
- Succeeded by: Prabhatsinh Chauhan
- Constituency: Kheda

Personal details
- Born: 28 May 1926 Vyasda, Panchmahal District, British India
- Died: 8 December 2008 (aged 82) Kheda, Gujarat, India
- Party: Indian National Congress

Ajitsinh Dabhi (28 May 1926 – 8 December 2008) was an Indian politician. He was elected to the Lok Sabha, lower house of the Parliament of India from Kheda, Gujarat as a member of the Indian National Congress. he is son of Fulsinhji Dabhi a Koli by caste and a prominent leader of Gujarat Kshatriya Sabha.

Dabhi died in Kheda, Gujarat on 8 December 2008, at the age of 82.
