= Dilip Patel =

Indian politician

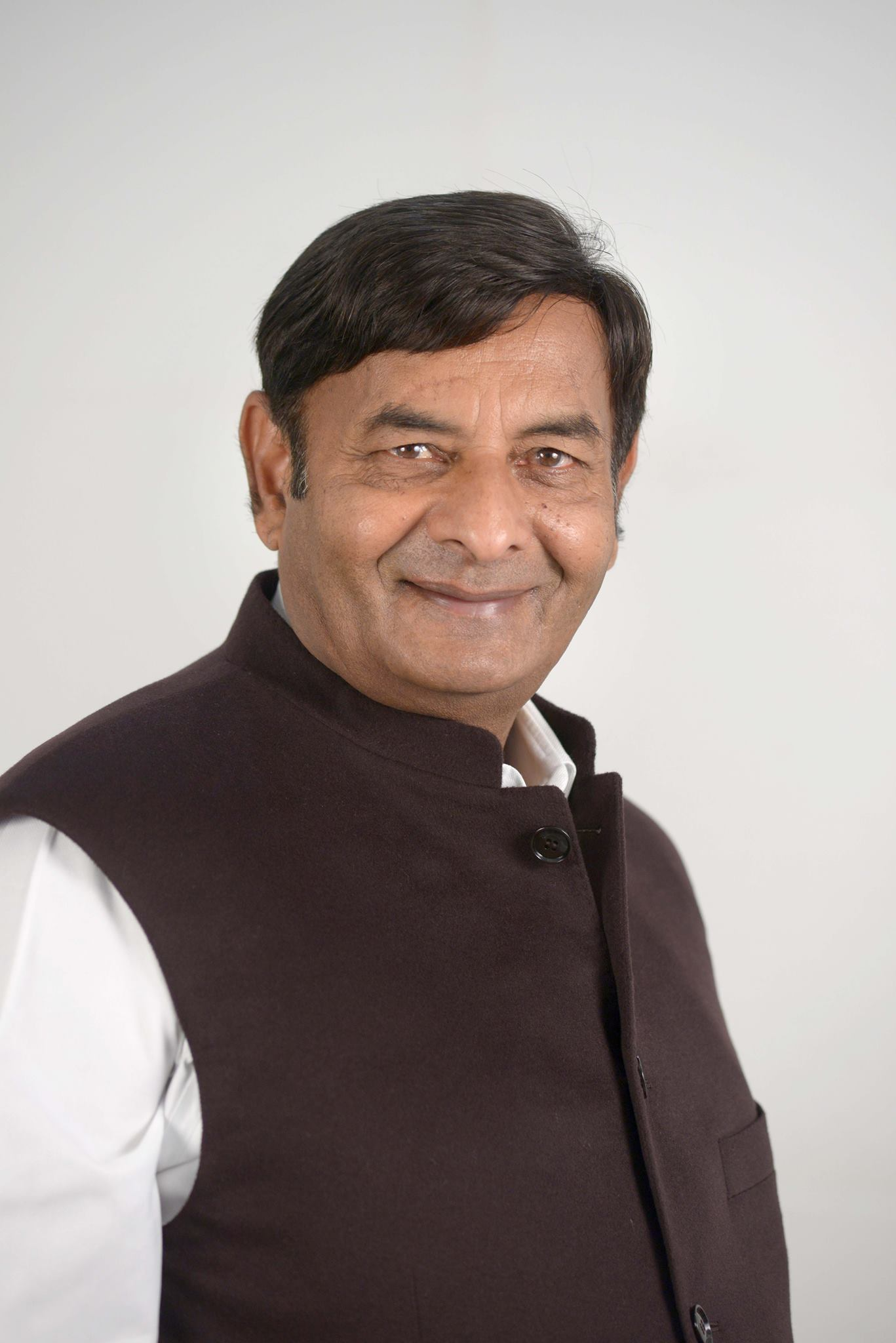

Personal details
- Party: Bharatiya Janata Party
- Website: www.dilippatel.co

Dilip Patel is an Indian politician and a member of parliament to the 16th Lok Sabha from Anand (Lok Sabha constituency), Gujarat. He won the 2014 Indian general election being a Bharatiya Janata Party candidate.
