= Godhra Lok Sabha constituency =

Former Lok Sabha Constituency in Gujarat

Coordinates: 22.8°N 73.6°E

Godhra
- Former Lok Sabha constituency

Constituency details
- Country: India
- Region: Western India
- State: Gujarat
- Established: 1967
- Abolished: 2009
- Reservation: None

Godhra was a Lok Sabha parliamentary constituency in Gujarat, India. Most of its area is now covered by the Panchmahal Lok Sabha constituency, after the 2008 delimitation.

== Members of Lok Sabha ==
- 1952-62: Does not Exist
- 1967: Piloo Mody, Swatantra Party
- 1971: Piloo Mody, Swatantra Party
- 1977: Hitendra Desai, Indian National Congress
- 1980: Jaideep Singh, Congress (Indira)
- 1984: Jaideep Singh, Congress (Died in 1987–88)
- 1988^ : P S Pursottam Bhai (Janata Party), in a bye-poll
- 1989: Shantilal Patel, Indian National Congress
- 1991: Shankarsinh Vaghela, Bharatiya Janata Party
- 1996: Shantilal Patel, Janata Dal
- 1998: Shantilal Patel, Indian National Congress
- 1999: Bhupendrasinh Solanki, Bharatiya Janata Party
- 2004: Bhupendrasinh Solanki, Bharatiya Janata Party
- 2008 onwards : The Godhra constituency was reconstituted as Panchmahal seat in 2008 re-organization of Lok Sabha seats.

== Election results ==
=== 1999 ===
- Solanki, Bhupendrasinh Prabhatsinh (BJP) : 280,684 votes
- Patel, Shantilal Parshotamdas (INC) : 185,662

=== 2004 ===
- Solanki, Bhupendrasinh Prabhatsinh (BJP) : 295,550 votes
- Patel Rajendrasinh Balvantsinh (INC) : 241,831

== See also ==
- Godhra
- List of constituencies of the Lok Sabha
- Panchmahal Lok Sabha constituency
