= Dharmsinh Desai =

Indian politician (1916–1980)

Member of Parliament, Lok Sabha
- In office 1971–1977
- Succeeded by: Ajitsinh Dabhi
- Constituency: Kheda, Gujarat

Personal details
- Born: 30 October 1916 Bhadran, Anand district, British India
- Died: 9 June 1980 (aged 63)
- Party: Indian National Congress
- Spouse: Shantaben D. Desai
- Children: Narendra D Desai
- Education: Bachelor of Engineering Electrical & Mechanical
- Alma mater: Elphinstone College, Bombay; Fergusson College, Pune; The Institute of Science, Mumbai; Bombay University
- Occupation: Entrepreneur, businessman, Member of Parliament, Lok Sabha, 1971–1979

Dharmsinh Dadubhai Desai (30 October 1916 – 9 June 1980) was an Indian politician, industrialist, and educationist. A member of the Indian National Congress, he served as a Member of Parliament for the Kaira (now Kheda) constituency in Gujarat from 1971 to 1977. He founded the APAR Industries and Dharmsinh Desai University.

== Early life and education ==
Dharmsinh was born in Bhadran, Anand district, Gujarat. His father, Dadubhai P. Desai, was active in local administration and served in the legislative assembly. A cousin of Sardar Vallabhbhai Patel, he worked closely with Patel during the independence movement. Desai attended Elphinstone College, Fergusson College, and Royal Institute of Science before earning electrical and mechanical engineering degrees from the University of Bombay's Kalina campus. He completed his studies with distinction. He became a Fellow of the Institution of Engineers (India) and held memberships in the Institute of Electrical and Electronics Engineers (IEEE) and the American Society of Mechanical Engineers (ASME).

=== Family and children ===
In 1938 Desai married Shantaben. They had one son, Narendra (born 1940). Desai wrote five books and edited Arya Swapatra, a farmers’ bulletin.

== Career ==
Desai began his career at the Ahmedabad Electric Company and later worked on power-distribution systems for Brihanmumbai Electric Supply and Transport (BEST) in Bombay. He subsequently started a private venture that repaired transformers and electrical systems. After the Second World War he travelled to Germany and Japan, securing distribution agreements with firms such as Mercedes-Benz, General Electric, and Yanmar. In 1942 he founded Hindustan Electric Company (HEC), an electrical-equipment manufacturer that later entered an equity and technology partnership with Swiss firm Brown Boveri Ltd. Renamed Hindustan Brown Boveri Limited (HBBL), the company was listed on India’s stock exchanges in 1949. Desai served as Managing Director and later Chairman. HBBL was eventually integrated into Asea Brown Boveri (ABB) in India. Among other roles, Desai chaired the Development Council for Heavy Electrical Industries (1966–1970) under the Ministry of Industry and sat on the Gujarat Industrial Development Corporation’s Committee for Engineering Industries. He helped establish the Electrical Research and Development Association (ERDA), which supports testing and research for India’s electrical sector. In 1958 he left HBBL and founded Power Cables Pvt. Ltd., later renamed APAR Industries Limited. The company began producing aluminium conductors and, in 1968, launched transformer oil in collaboration with Sun Oil Company of the United States under the brand name POWEROIL.

APAR Industries subsequently manufactured aluminium and alloy conductors, specialty and renewable cables, and transformer oils, and exported to markets in the Americas, Africa, the Middle East, Europe, and the SAARC region. Leadership of APAR Industries passed to the third generation of the Desai family in 2004, with Kushal Desai serving as Chairman and Managing Director and Chaitanya N. Desai as Managing Director.

=== Political career ===
Desai was exposed to politics early through his father and his uncles, Sardar Vallabhbhai Patel and Vithalbhai Patel. He took part in several satyagrahas during the independence movement and adopted Khadi clothing, a practice he maintained throughout his life. After independence he argued that Parliament needed greater representation from industry. He was elected to the Lok Sabha from Kheda in 1971 and again in 1977. While in Parliament he served on consultative committees for Industrial Development, Science and Technology, Heavy Industries, Petroleum and Chemicals, and Atomic Energy, and on select committees dealing with Foreign Exchange, Direct Taxes, and the Customs Bill. He also supported regional infrastructure projects, including a canal system that aided agriculture in Kheda district.

== Philanthropy ==
Desai supported education and rural development through several trusts. In 1968 he founded the Dharmsinh Desai Institute of Technology in Nadiad, which later became Dharmsinh Desai University, the first independent university in Gujarat. Originally an engineering college, it later added programmes in pharmacy, management, and dental sciences, and work began in 2016 to establish a medical college. Desai also founded Shantaben Dharmsinh Desai High School in Vallabh Vidyanagar, a girls’ school in Udwada, and several schools in Nadiad.

== Death ==
He died on June 9, 1980.
