= Rashtriya Samajwadi Party- Secular =

Political party in India

The Rashtriya Samajwadi Party- Secular is a political party in India. The RSP-Secular is led by party president Sandhya Singh
