= Patidar reservation agitation =

Public demonstrations in Gujarat, India, since 2015

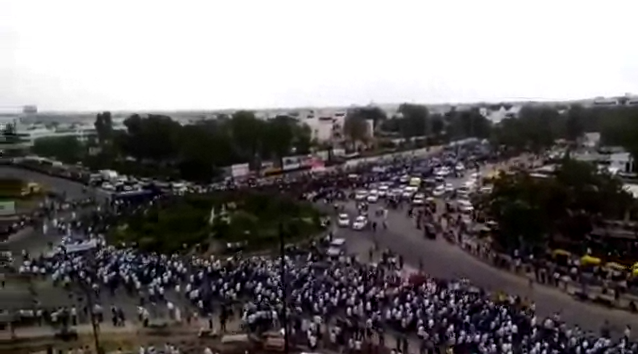
- Demonstration rally at Ahmedabad on 25 August 2015
- Date: 6 July 2015 – 14 January 2019
- Location: Gujarat, India
- Also known as: Patel quota stir, Patidar Anamat Andolan
- Type: street protest, protest march, procession
- Cause: Seeking Other Backward Class status for the Patidar community
- Organised by: Several Patidar community organisations
- Outcome: 103rd Amendment of the constitution granting 10% reservation to Economically Weaker Section
- Deaths: 14
- Injuries: at least 27 citizens and 203 police personnel
- Property damage: Several vehicles, more than 200 buses and public properties damaged across Gujarat; Ahmedabad: ₹ 12 crore (120 million rupees); Rajkot: ₹ 1.47 crore (14.7 million rupees); Police department:₹ 200 crore (2,000 million rupees)
- Arrests: At least 650
- Charges: 438 cases under various charges (391 withdrawn later)

Starting in July 2015, the people of India's Patidar community, (Note: Also called Patels, from a very common cognate surname among them) seeking Other Backward Class (OBC) status, held public demonstrations across the Indian state of Gujarat.

The largest demonstration was held in Ahmedabad on 25 August 2015, and was attended by thousands. Later, there were incidents of violence and arson across the state, resulting in the imposition of curfew in several cities and towns. Properties and vehicles worth crores (tens of millions) of rupees were damaged and destroyed. The state returned to normalcy by 28 August. Despite talks with the government, the agitation resumed and turned violent again on 19 September. The government announced the offers of scholarships and subsidies to general category students on 24 September 2015 and a 10% seats reserved for the economically backward classes in April 2016. The 10% reservation was quashed by the Gujarat High Court in August 2016. The agitation lingered on for two more years. In January 2019, the Parliament of India amended the constitution granting maximum 10% reservation to the Economically Weaker Section (EWS) of the society. The amendment was challenged in the Supreme Court where its validity was upheld in November 2022.

== Background ==
In India, the Other Backward Class (OBC) status invokes affirmative action which provides reserved quotas in education and government jobs. In Gujarat, 27% of the seats in government and education are reserved for OBC, 7.5% for Scheduled Castes and 15% for Scheduled Tribes for a total of 49.5% of all seats. (Note: Other Backward Castes, Scheduled Castes and Scheduled Tribes are collectively called "Reserved category", where other groups are called "general category".) The Supreme Court capped the reservation at 50% in their 1992 judgement in the Indra Sawhney and Others v. Union of India.

In 1981, the Government of Gujarat, headed by Indian National Congress (INC) chief minister Madhav Singh Solanki, introduced the reservation for socially and economically backward castes (SEBC), chiefly Koli caste, based on recommendations of the Bakshi Commission. It resulted in anti-reservation agitation across the state, which spilled over in riots that resulted in more than one hundred deaths. Solanki resigned in 1985 but later returned to power, winning 149 out of 182 assembly seats. He was supported by Kshatriya, Dalit, Adivasi and Muslims, collectively called KHAM. This caused other communities, including Patidars, to lose the political influence which later alienated the INC. Patidars represents 12.3% of the population of Gujarat. The SEBC (later the OBC) list initially comprised 81 communities, which by 2014 had expanded to 146 communities. In the 1980s the proportion of reserved seats was 10%; by 2014 it had increased to 27%.

The Patidar community is facing class-differentiation within the community. There was a growing discontent among Patidar youth due to shrinking economic opportunities and among older generation due to their downward social mobility.

The agitation took inspiration from the Gurjar agitation in Rajasthan, which ended in May 2015.

== Agitation in 2015 ==
=== July ===
In July 2015 Patidar youth, many of whom are surnamed Patel, started public demonstrations across Gujarat, demanding OBC status for their community, which would entitle the Patidars to a reserved quota of places in government jobs and education.

They were supported by Sardar Patel Sevadal, an organisation for community service, and they formed the Patidar Anamat Andolan Samiti (PAAS) for this purpose, headed by Hardik Patel. The organisation described itself as apolitical. Four major Patidar organisations denied any involvement in the agitation, though later the Khodaldham Trust offered to mediate between the youth and the government.

The agitation started in Mehsana on 6 July 2015, and a demonstration was held in Mansa on 22 July.

The demonstration in Visnagar on 23 July turned violent when some agitators torched some vehicles and vandalised the office of Bharatiya Janata Party MLA Rushikesh Patel.Demonstrations were held in Vijapur and Mehsana on 28 July. The police booked 152 persons for violating prohibitory orders by holding the demonstration. On 30 July there were demonstrations in Lunavada.

=== August ===
Social media helped to spread the protest quickly across the state. Demonstrations were held in Devbhumi Dwarka district on 1 August; in Gandhinagar, Navsari, Jam Jodhpur in Jamnagar district, Himatnagar and Bagasara in Amreli district on 3 August; in Rajkot on 5 August; in Amreli on 10 August; in Junagadh on 12 August; and in Petlad on 17 August. The demonstration in Surat on 17 August drew crowds estimated at 100,000 to 450,000 people. The diamond and textile markets of the city remained closed, as did several schools and colleges. Demonstrations were held in Surendranagar, Bharuch, Ankleshwar and Vadodara on 21 August. PAAS itself organised 37 rallies by 25 August. In 55 days, 149 rallies were organised by various organisations across the state.

==== 25–31 August ====
Rally in Ahmedabad, 25 August 2015

The major demonstration, dubbed Kranti Rally (Revolution Rally) and held in Ahmedabad on 25 August at the GMDC grounds, was attended by over 500,000. The members of community formed a procession and presented the memorandum of their demands to the District Collector. Hardik Patel, who led the rally, declared he would go on a hunger strike with others, demanding the Chief Minister personally be present there to receive the memorandum. He was arrested as he did not have permission to stay on the grounds after the rally, and later released. Those present on the grounds were dispersed by the police using force. An inquiry was ordered to investigate the reason behind the police's use of force. Anandiben Patel and Rajnikant Patel, state leaders, both denied ordering or authorising the police charge on the crowd.

Incidents of violence and clashes were reported in Ahmedabad and other parts of the state. The police vehicles and local transport buses of AMTS and BRTS were set on fire. At least fifteen cases of clashes and arson were reported. The mob vandalised shops in the CTM area and the police fired eight teargas shells to disperse the mob. There were clashes between members of the Rabari caste and Patels in Ghatlodiya, where at least ten persons were injured. A large mob tried to damage railway tracks near Ranip. Many vehicles were damaged. Attacks on police and media personnel were reported. A curfew was imposed in the city under Section 144. Ahmedabad Municipal Corporation suffered damage worth ₹ 12 crore including torching of 33 buses of local transport. At least seven ward offices and civic centres were vandalised. Five companies of the Indian Army were deployed in the city to control the situation.

In Surat, the curfew was imposed from 25 to 27 August in the city as the mob torched buses, two ATMs, van, Fire Station and damaged some properties. Over 120 people were arrested or detained. Violence was also reported in Vadodara. Ahmedabad–Vadodara Expressway was blocked by agitators for hours. A total of 1554 bus trips were cancelled by the Vadodara division of GSRTC when six buses were damaged.

In Rajkot, Rajkot BRTS bus stations were torched and stones thrown; damage to public and private property was estimated at ₹ 1.47 crore. The mob ransacked two offices of Union Minister of State for Agriculture and local MP Mohan Kundariya; police fired 10 rounds in the air and lobbed 57 shells of teargas to disperse mobs. Twelve policemen were injured. The police filed 18 FIRs related to incidents. A curfew was imposed for 48 hours on 26 August.

Curfew was also imposed in parts of Mehsana district including Mehsana, Visnagar and Unjha after a mob stoned and torched the house of minister Rajni Patel, Home minister Nitinbhai Patel, and BJP MLA Jayshreeben Patel. The district police lodged 25 FIRs and 13 cases over various instances of violence and rioting, and 36 persons were identified. At least 22 people were arrested in the cases; three of them were released on bail. Vandalism was also reported from Morbi and Amreli. A curfew was also imposed in Patan for two days.

3500 paramilitary force personnel and 93 companies of the state reserve police were deployed. Ten people died in the violence: five in Ahmedabad, a police constable in Surat, three in Banaskantha district, and one in Patan district. A youth died in police custody in Bapunagar, Ahmedabad. Across the state, 295 FIRs were filed and 650 people arrested. Schools and colleges across the state were kept closed from 26 to 30 August. Internet service on mobile phones and certain broadband newspapers, like WhatsApp and Facebook, were blocked across the state for six days, 26–31 August. The internet block was continued in Ahmedabad and Surat. According to Western Railways, the tracks were damaged at eight places by mobs, resulting in cancellation of 51 trains. The operation of 26 trains were affected, while 15 trains were diverted out of the state. About 340 police cases were registered across the state including 40 cases registered in Ahmedabad; 230 of these were registered on behalf of the government. The Police department suffered damage of ₹ 200 crore.

On 26 August, agitators called for a one-day statewide shutdown. The state returned to normalcy by 28 August. Hardik Patel declared the intention of expanding the agitation to the other states of India. As he received support from various Jat, Kurmi and Gurjar community organisations, he declared campaign for petitions to be sent to the Prime Minister. Rallies were organised in Karamsad and in Bhopal, Madhya Pradesh, on 31 August but did not attract great support.

According to PAAS, a total of 457 FIRs were filed against 1482 Patidars across Gujarat in the three days after 25 August rally.

=== September ===
The internet block was lifted in Ahmedabad and Surat on 1 September. PAAS announced that they will organise a march on the reverse route, from Dandi to Ahmedabad, of Mahatma Gandhi's historic Salt March in 1930. The heads of 33 village nearby Dandi opposed the march. The collector for Navsari district denied permission for the march. The march was rescheduled to 13 September but the government denied permission, and PAAS called the march off.

Patidar Anamat Andolan Samiti spokesperson Nikhil Savani

On 9 September, Hardik Patel announced a new organisation, Patel Navnirman Sena (PNS), for nationwide extension of the agitation. Patel met former Chief Minister Keshubhai Patel prior to a meeting with government members on 14 September. 20 Patidar representatives led by Hardik Patel and Lalji Patel the meeting, which was chaired by the Chief Minister and attended by cabinet ministers. The issues discussed included the police action on 25 August, scholarship schemes for general category students, compensation to people died in violence, and release of arrested people. In a symbolic boycott, Patidars withdrew large amounts of cash from Kherol and Vadrad branches of Sabarkantha District Central Cooperative Bank of Sabarkantha district.

Hardik Patel announced that they would organise rallies in Madhya Pradesh and Bihar in October 2015, a month before the 2015 Bihar Legislative Assembly election .

On 19 September police detained Hardik Patel and 35 of his supporters from the Varachha area of Surat for trying to hold the Ekta Yatra (Unity March) rally without receiving prior permission from authorities. They were booked under section 188 of the IPC for defying police notification, and two FIRs were filed against them. They were released on bail later. There were some incidents of protests, arson, property damage and road blocks in several cities and towns, including Ahmedabad, Surat, Rajkot, Vadodara, Morbi, Navsari, Botad, Visnagar, Mehsana and Jamnagar. A Patidar mob clashed with a Rabari community in the Rabari Colony area of Ahmedabad. In Surat and Morbi, two GSRTC buses were damaged. In several places police used teargas and caning to disperse mobs. The internet on mobile phones, social media and SMS service was blocked again for 24 hours in several parts of the state, including Ahmedabad, Gandhinagar, Surat, Vadodara and Rajkot. Twelve companies each of the BSF and RAF were deployed to control the violence.

On 19 September, police in Mehsana arrested 35 protesters and lodged a complaint against them. On 22 September at least 20 Patidar leaders were arrested and FIR filed against them when they held a meeting without police permission in Tenpur village of Bayad Taluka, Aravalli district. Hardik Patel briefly disappeared from the meeting and appeared the next day. The Gujarat High Court termed the disappearance as a 'publicity stunt' and warned about contempt of court. On 23 September PAAS leader Nilesh Advadiya was booked under sedition charges.

On 24 September, Chief Minister of Gujarat announced the Mukhyamantri Yuva Swavlamban Yojna (Chief Minister's Youth Self-Reliance Scheme), a scheme for offering scholarships and subsidies to general category students in higher education, and uniforms and free books in school education. In higher education, the scheme is offered to students in the 90th percentile or higher in the board examinations and to students whose parents earn less than ₹4.5 lakh per year. She also offered age relaxation of five years in government jobs. The government also announced its intention to increase intake in medical and engineering education, and infrastructure such as student hostels. The scheme is expected to cost the exchequer ₹1,000 crore per year. The Patidar community in the US initially planned to hold large protests in New York during the visit of Prime Minister of India Narendra Modi, but later called them off, except for some people who protested at United Nations headquarters and in California. Hardik Patel called the scheme as a "lollipop" and said it does not meet their demands, and launched a "lollipop movement" in which lollipops were distributed to community members across the state.

On 26 September activist Umesh Patel from Rajkot committed suicide in support of the agitation; the state Government ordered the inquiry in the case. The Sardar Patel Seva Charitable Trust, a Patidar doctors' group from Gujarat and abroad, announced financial help of Rs 1 crore to kin of each person who died in the agitation. Umiya Mata Sansthan, a major organisation of the community, announced their support to the agitation on 28 September. Nine protestors arrested in Himatnagar for holding protest fasts on 4 September were later released on bail.

=== October ===
On 1 October the Indian National Congress announced its support for the agitation. Hardik Patel addressed peasants and farmers at Maha Kisan Panchayat. More people were arrested in cases related to the riots, and two policemen were suspended in the case of custodial death of a youth on 25 August. Some Patidar community members protested the presence of politicians at Garba venues during the Navratri festival in October. They also protested at functions attended by politicians. In many places across the state women of the Patidar community clanked belans (rolling pins) against thalis (steel plates) as a sign of protest.

Hardik Patel threatened to stage a protest at the Niranjan Shah Stadium and to block the way of cricket players at the third One Day International cricket match between India and South Africa in Rajkot on 18 October 2015. More than 8000 police personnel were deployed in the city, while 2500 police and 500 private security personnel were deployed in the stadium. Internet services were blocked from the night of 17 October to the morning of 19 October. Hardik Patel was arrested along with six others on the day. There were protests against Hardik's detention in Surat and Bardoli, and a GSRTC bus was set on fire in Morbi; four people were arrested from Morbi and one from Tankara for attacking the bus. There were rallies in protest of the arrests.

Hardik Patel and five other PAAS leaders were booked by Ahmedabad City Police under Indian Penal Code Sections 121 (waging war against the government), 121A (using criminal force against the government), 124 (sedition), 153-A (promoting enmity between different communities), 120B (conspiracy) and 153-B (assertions prejudicial to national integrity). Surat police booked Hardik Patel under sedition charges for telling a youth to kill policemen instead of committing suicide. Gujarat High Court refused to quash cases of sedition against Hardik Patel on 27 October.

=== November–December ===
Local civic elections were held across Gujarat in November 2015. Several Patidar leaders urged voting against ruling BJP candidates and supporting INC candidates. The result of election showed that the rural and lower-middle-class Patidars probably moved to INC from BJP in large numbers while urban middle-class Patidars continued to vote BJP.

== Agitation in 2016 ==
=== January–March ===
With Hardik Patel still in jail and facing several charges, PAAS organised a 33-day-long Ekta Yatra (Unity March) across eleven districts of Saurastra, starting from Sidsar, Jamnagar and culminating in Kagvad. The SPG demanded a reservation under the EBC (Economically Backward Class) quota to avoid confrontation with OBCs.

During the budget session of the Gujarat Legislative Assembly, 55 INC MLAs were suspended by the speaker when they raised slogans in support of the agitation and hurled lollipops toward the treasury benches and the chief minister.

=== April ===
After the Jat reservation agitation, the government of Haryana accepted the demand of the Jat community for reservations, prompting another round of agitation. The seven-member committee headed by Nitin Patel failed to reach a compromise, and Vitthal Radadiya, a BJP MP, held a second round of negotiation. A new organisation, Patidar Sangh, was also formed, based in Surat and consisting of people from the diamond industry. They announced grants of ₹ 3 lakh to the kin of each of the 12 Patidars who died in the agitation. They also organised a symbolic fast in support of the release of Patidar leaders from jail. PAAS and SPG presented their demands. Hardik Patel and other Patidar leaders continue to face legal charges and are in jail. Patidars started "Jail Bharo Andolan" (Fill The Jails Agitation) for their release on 17 April 2016. Permission to hold the protest was refused, and the district administration issued prohibitory orders under section 144, but the protestors defied the order. The agitation turned violent as protestors clashed with police in Mehsana. Around 25 protestors, five policemen and two officials were injured in the clashes. Curfew was imposed in Mehsana. Mobile internet service was suspended in Ahmedabad, Mehsana, Surat and Rajkot. Four companies of the RAF were deployed in the affected cities, and ten companies of the CRPF were requested from the central government. There were some arrests. There were also clashes in the Varachha area of Surat. Some Patidar groups called for a statewide Bandh (strike). One Patidar leader committed suicide in Surat.

The Government of Gujarat announced a 10% reservation for Economically Backward Classes (EBC) (Note: The EBC are people whose income is below ₹ 6 Lakh per year.) among the upper castes in educational institutions and jobs.

=== May–August ===
On 15 July 2016, Hardik Patel was granted bail on condition that he stay out of the state for six months and out of Mehsana for nine months. On 29 July, the Government of Gujarat announced that they will withdraw 391 of 438 cases filed against Patidar community members. The Chief Minister Anandiben Patel resigned, citing her age, but the media speculated that the handling of agitation was one of her reasons. On 4 August, the Gujarat High Court quashed the 10% EBC reservation, citing it as unconstitutional and in violation of guidelines of the Supreme Court. The government challenged the order in the Supreme Court on 9 August. Other leaders of PAAS accused Hardik Patel of spending the community's money on furthering his personal interests.

=== September–December ===
Patidars boycotted and disrupted an event held for felicitation of 44 BJP MLAs of Patidar community in Surat on 7 September by Amit Shah, BJP President and Vijay Rupani, the newly appointed Chief Minister. Three days later, an event in Atkot village of Jasdan Taluka where Rupani was present and an event in Bhavnagar for felicitation of Jitu Vaghani, state BJP chief, were disrupted. 26 protestors were detained in Atkot while 11 were detained in Bhavnagar for disrupting the events. Seven police were also booked later for assault on protestors. The rally in Bhavnagar on 30 September was cancelled as the police detained the leaders of PAAS. The ordinance for EBC reservation lapsed (Note: According to Article 213 of the Constitution of India, any ordinance has to be presented as a bill and passed in the state legislative assembly in the session held after its issue. The ordinance lapses after six weeks passed from the last session.) on 4 October as the case is in the Supreme Court which had earlier given interim direction to not allow fresh admissions or recruitment under the EBC reservation.

Several Patidar leaders had requested to vote against BJP in the local body elections. On 27 November 2016, the local body elections of 126 seats in 16 districts of Gujarat was held which included two municipalities and one Panchayat samiti and by-elections for over 100 seats for various local bodies. The BJP won 109 seats while INC won 17 seats, 39 less than the last elections.

The 11 members committee of PAAS held talks with three state ministers on 1 December 2016 to discuss their demands.

== Agitation in 2017–2022 ==
The agitation lingered on in 2017 and 2018. The PAAS supported the campaign of the INC in the 2017 Gujarat Legislative Assembly election which had agreed to the demand. Several Patidar leaders also aligned with the BJP. BJP won the election with majority in the assembly but performed below result of the previous election in 2012. INC increased its seats in the assembly. INC brought private members bill for reservation in March 2018 but was rejected.

In August–September 2018, Hardik Patel fasted for nineteen days demanding the reservation. In December 2018, he had requested to the INC leaders to bring the private members bill again in the legislative assembly.

The Parliament of India passed the bill carrying the One Hundred and Third Amendment of the Constitution of India which was commenced on 14 January 2019 granting maximum 10% reservation to the Economically Weaker Section (EWS) of the society. The amendment was challenged in the Supreme Court. The Government of Gujarat announced the implementation on the same date. In August 2020, the cases challenging 103rd amendment was referred to five-judge Constitution Batch of Supreme Court for hearing. The Supreme Court upheld the validity of the amendment in November 2022.

Several agitation leaders joined politics and contested 2022 Gujarat Legislative Assembly election. On 12 March 2019, Hardik Patel joined the INC but later switched to BJP in June 2022. He contested and was elected from Viramgam Assembly constituency. Other leaders including Alpesh Kathiriya, Gopal Italia and Dharmik Malavia joined Aam Aadmi Party (AAP) and contested from Varachha Road, Katargam and Olpad constituencies respectively. Another leader Reshma Patel had joined BJP in 2017, later moved to Nationalist Congress Party in 2019 and then to AAP in November 2022. Gopal Italia was elected from Visavadar constituency in June 2025 by-elections.

== Reactions ==
=== Social ===
Some Patidar leaders and organisations criticised Hardik Patel, his tactics and his organisation PAAS. More than 1000 Patels held a meeting in Edison, New Jersey, US, to extend their support to agitation led by SPG.

Leaders of several other Gujarat communities, including the Brahmin, Thakor, Vaishnav, Rajput, Sindhi, Kansara, Soni and Raghuvanshi communities, also started agitation for reservation along similar lines. The Jat community of Uttar Pradesh and Haryana announced that they would start agitation in the same manner beginning in September 2015, although their demand for reservation goes back around two decades.

Other community organisations, such as Gujjar Vikas Parishad, Kurmi-Kshatriya Mahasabha, Anjana-Chaudhari Samaj, and Rashtriya Gujjar Manch, also extended their support to the agitation.

The leaders of the communities already having OBC status opposed the agitation. OBC Ekta Manch along with Gujarat Kshatriya Thakor Sena held a counter-protest attended by thousands on 23 August in Ahmedabad and Rajkot. OBC Ekta Manch also requested permission to hold a counter-protest Pratikar Rally, on 19 September, but the authorities denied permission, citing the law and order situation.

On 14 September 2015, Andhra Pradeshbased organisation Agra Kula Ikya Vedika, a forum of upper castes, with representatives from Brahmin, Khatriya, Vysya, Kamma, Reddy, Velama, and Kapu communities, met in Vijayawada and demanded that the reservation be based on economic status instead of caste and religion. They also asked the Central government to constitute a committee headed by a Supreme Court judge to study the issue.

In September 2016, an agitation for reservation for Maratha in Maharashtra intensified.

The agitation sparked debates on reservations, caste system, caste politics, Votebank politics, increased cost of education and unemployment for youth across Gujarat and across India in general.

=== Political ===
On 11 August 2015 the Chief Minister of Gujarat, Anandiben Patel, formed a seven-member panel to interact with the community and submit a report to the government. The panel, headed by Nitinbhai Patel, also included Ramanlal Vora, Bhupendrasinh Chudasama, Babubhai Bokhiria, Vasu Trivedi, Nanubhai Vanani, and Rajni Patel. On 17 August the panel held talks with community organisations, including SPG. The PAAS did not participate in the talks. On 21 and 23 August the government published a full-length advertisement in leading Gujarati newspapers arguing legal and constitutional limitations. The chief minister expressed her inability to include Patidar in the OBC category, citing constitutional limitations, and urged the agitators to negotiate; they rejected the call. After violence following 25 August rally in Ahmedabad, she expressed regret and ordered an inquiry, and called for peace and order in the state. The panel submitted its report on 9 September, and a second talk was held on 14 September. On 17 September she again urged an end to the agitation to avoid class conflict in the state. On 19 September she again met with the cabinet when violence broke out for a second time. On 25 September she announced the Mukhya Mantri Yuva Swalamban Scheme for general category students, which is expected to cost the exchequer ₹ 1,000 crore per year.

On 26 August, Narendra Modi appealed for peace and resolution through dialogue.

During the Monsoon session of the Gujarat Legislative Assembly, which started on 26 August, the opposition Indian National Congress demanded a probe into police atrocities following 25 August rally. The Speaker suspended the assembly three times, and suspended all INC MLAs except opposition leader Shankersinh Vaghela for a day. Vaghela said that before reviewing the reservation policy, the BJP must ensure that the grounds on which reservation was offered did not exist. On 1 October Gurudas Kamat, General Secretary of the INC, announced its support for the agitation and demanded nationwide reservation for 15-20% population from the Economically Weaker Section (EWS) of society.

The ruling BJP and opposition INC leaders assessed the impact of the agitation on upcoming local elections in 2015.

Nalin Kotadiya, BJP MLA of Dhari, and Sabarkantha MP Dipsinh Shankarsinh Rathod declared their support for the agitation. Nalin Kotdiya later also urged voters to vote for INC in the October 2015 elections. Former Chief Minister of Gujarat Madhav Singh Solanki said that the agitation would not last long. Former Chief Minister Keshubhai Patel expressed his support if the agitation is nonviolent.

Some media reported Nitish Kumar, Chief Minister of Bihar, as expressing solidarity with the agitation, but he later denied it. Sharad Yadav advised dismissing the agitators' demands, calling them unjustified, and said that the reason behind the agitation is a lack of job opportunities. INC MP Rahul Gandhi blamed the Modi government and called the agitation a repercussion of the "politics of anger". On 28 August six Councillor of Padra resigned in support of agitation. The Aam Aadmi Party released a statement criticising police action against agitators and destruction of public property by agitators. The Communist Party of India (Marxist) condemned violence and police action. Biju Janata Dal MP Baijayant Panda said the angst of the Patidar community is justified by the scarcity of jobs across the nation.

Rashtriya Swayamsevak Sangh chief Mohan Bhagwat suggested a review of the effectiveness of reservations. In an interview in the RSS's periodical Sadhna, national spokesperson Manmohan Vaidya said that he supports the reservation given to SC and ST based on historical injustice, but criticised Hardik Patel for his speech and divisive tactics.

The Government of Gujarat passed two ordinances to postpone election of local governing bodies whose five-year terms end in October–November 2015. These local governing bodies include 253 Municipality, 208 Panchayat samiti, 26 district panchayats and six municipal corporations. The Gujarat High Court later quashed the ordinances.

=== Judicial ===
Following violence on 25 August, the Gujarat High Court issued notices to police and Government of Gujarat to conduct a probe and submit a report regarding involvement of police in property damage and atrocities. In case of custodial death of youth in Ahmedabad, the court ordered state CID probe. PIL seeking investigation by judicial commission in role of Patidar leaders in violence was filed in the court. The High Court ordered the state government to pay ₹ 4 lakh as compensation to the kin of people died in the violence, ₹ 2 lakh to the person who suffered disability over 65% and ₹ 10,000 to person who was injured in police atrocity. The public interest litigation was filed in the High Court which demands prohibition on blanket ban on internet services as happened in the end of August 2015. Later the court upheld the decision of government in banning the internet. The Gujarat High Court also ordered filing FIR in cases of excesses on part of the police on 16 September. The court also heard cases on various Patidar leaders in October 2015.

Gujarat High Court quashed the ordinances postponing local body elections citing them as unconstitutional and directed the State Election Commission to hold the elections by 25 December.

When the petitions were filed against 10% EBC reservation, it was quashed by the Gujarat High Court in August 2016 citing it as unconstitutional. The government moved to the Supreme Court challenging the order. The Supreme Court gave an interim direction to not allow fresh admissions or recruitment under the EBC reservation. The ordinance for EBC reservation lapsed on 4 October.

Power of Patidar, a film about the agitation, was denied clearance by the Central Board of Film Certification.
