= K. R. Kaushik =

K. R. Kaushik (born 29 September 1948) is an Indian Police Service officer who briefly served as the Director General of Police (DGP) of the Gujarat Police in 2007. He joined the Gujarat Police Force in 1972. He was appointed as the police commissioner of Ahmedabad during the 2002 Gujarat violence. He served as DGP when the Election Commission of India appointed him during the legislative election in Gujarat in 2007. P. C. Pande, who had earlier held the post, was re-appointed as DGP after the elections by the Narendra Modi government.

Kaushik was an accused in the 2004 Ishrat Jahan fake encounter case when he was the Ahmedabad Police commissioner.

Preceded by P. C. Pande	Police commissioner of Ahmedabad; May 2002 – December 2006	Succeeded by J. Mahapatra
