= Gondal Assembly constituency =

Legislative Assembly constituency in Gujarat State, India

Coordinates: 21.96°N 70.79°E

Gondal
- Constituency No. 73 for the Gujarat Legislative Assembly

Constituency details
- Country: India
- Region: Western India
- State: Gujarat
- District: Rajkot
- Lok Sabha constituency: Porbandar
- Total electors: 228,608
- Reservation: None

Member of Legislative Assembly
- 15th Gujarat Legislative Assembly
- Incumbent Geetaba Jadeja
- Party: Bharatiya Janata Party
- Elected year: 2022

Gondal is one of the 182 Legislative Assembly constituencies of Gujarat state in India. It is part of Rajkot district and is a segment of Porbandar Lok Sabha constituency.

== List of segments ==
This assembly seat represents the following segments,

1. Gondal Taluka – Entire taluka except villages – Dadva Hamirpara, Karmal Kotda.

== Members of Legislative Assembly ==
Year	Member	Picture	Party
1975	Popatbhai Lakhabhai Sorathiya		Independent politician
1980	Keshubhai Patel		Bharatiya Janata Party
1985	Popatbhai Lakhabhai Sorathiya		Indian National Congress
1990	Mahipatsinh Bhavubha Jadeja		Independent politician
1995	Mahipatsinh Bhavubha Jadeja		Independent politician
2002	Jayrajsinh Jadeja		Bharatiya Janata Party
2007	Chandubhai Vaghasiya		Nationalist Congress Party
2012	Jayrajsinh Jadeja		Bharatiya Janata Party
2017	Geetaba Jayrajsinh Jadeja		Bharatiya Janata Party
2022	Geetaba Jayrajsinh Jadeja		Bharatiya Janata Party

== Election results ==
=== 2022 ===
Gujarat Assembly election, 2022:Gondal Assembly constituency
Party	Candidate	Votes	%	±%
BJP	Geetaba Jadeja	86062	64.49	
INC	Desai Yatish Govindlal	42749	29.55	
AAP	Nimishaben Khunt	13,075	9.0	
NOTA	None of the above	2164	1.5	
Majority		43,313	29.94	
Turnout				
Registered electors		226,687		

=== 2017 ===
Gujarat Legislative Assembly Election, 2017: Gondal
Party	Candidate	Votes	%	±%
BJP	Geetaba Jadeja	70,900	50.41	−3.33
INC	Arjunbhai Khatariya	55,109	39.40	New
NCP	Omdevsinh Prabhatsinh Jadeja	6,004	4.29	+1.92
Majority		15,397	11.01	−2.31
Turnout		1,39,875	65.64	−11.23
Registered electors		213,098		
BJP hold		Swing		

=== 2012 ===
Gujarat Assembly Election, 2012
Party	Candidate	Votes	%	±%
BJP	Jayrajsinh Jadeja	79,709	53.74	+7.32
GPP	Gordhan Zadafia	59,943	40.42	New
NCP	Chandubhai Vaghasiya	3,519	2.37	−44.53
Majority		19,766	13.32	+12.84
Turnout				
BJP gain from NCP		Swing		

=== 2007 ===
Gujarat Assembly Election, 2007
Party	Candidate	Votes	%	±%
NCP	Chandubhai Vaghasiya	48,516	46.9	+19.71
BJP	Jayrajsinh Jadeja	48,028	46.42	+3.44
Independent	Bachubhai Vadodariya	3,055	2.95	
Majority		488	0.48	−15.31
Turnout		1,03,455		
NCP gain from BJP		Swing		

=== 2002 ===
Gujarat Assembly Election, 2002
Party	Candidate	Votes	%	±%
BJP	Jayrajsinh Jadeja	39,727	42.98	
NCP	Mahipatsinh Jadeja	25,133	27.19	
INC	Kurjibhai Bhalala	15,574	16.85	
Majority		14,594	15.79	
Turnout		92,462	60.81	

=== 1980 ===
- Patel, Keshubhai Savdas (BJP) : 24,572 votes
- Bhalodi Nanjibhai Savjibhai (INC-I) : 16,995

== See also ==
- List of constituencies of the Gujarat Legislative Assembly
- Rajkot district
