= Vinod Moradiya =

Indian politician

Vinod Moradiya (born 10 July 1967) is an Indian politician from Gujarat. He is a member of the Gujarat Legislative Assembly from Katargam Assembly constituency in Surat district. He won the 2022 Gujarat Legislative Assembly election representing the Bharatiya Janata Party.

== Early life and education ==
Moradiya is from Sarvai, Bhavnagar district, Gujarat. He is the son of Amarshibhai Moradiya. He married Gitaben Moradiya. He studied till Class 10 and passed the examinations conducted by the Gujarat Secondary and Higher Secondary Education Board, Gandhi Nagar in March 2015.

== Career ==
Moradiaya won from Katargam Assembly constituency representing the Bharatiya Janata Party in the 2022 Gujarat Legislative Assembly election. He polled 120,505 votes and defeated his nearest rival, Gopal Italia of the Aam Aadmi Party, by a margin of 64,627 votes. He first became an MLA winning the 2017 Gujarat Legislative Assembly election. In 2017, he polled 125,387 votes and defeated his nearest rival, Jignesh Jivani of the Indian National Congress by a margin of 79,230 votes.
