= Visavadar =

- City
- Location in Gujarat, India Visavadar (India)
- Coordinates: 21.38°N 70.68°E
- Country: India
- State: Gujarat
- District: Junagadh
- Elevation: 91 m (299 ft)

Population (2025)
  - Total: 45,000

Languages
  - Official: Gujarati, Hindi
- Time zone: UTC+5:30 (IST)
- Telephone code: 912873
- Vehicle registration: GJ-11
- Website: gujaratindia.com

Visavadar is a City and a municipality in Junagadh district in the Indian state of Gujarat. and Visavadar is a gateway of Gir National park.

== Geography ==
Visavadar is located at 21.38°N 70.68°E. It has an average elevation of 91 metres (298 feet).

== Demographics ==
As of 2001 India census, Visavadar had a population of 18,048. Males constitute 51% of the population and females 49%. Visavadar has an average literacy rate of 71%, higher than the national average of 59.5%: male literacy is 77%, and female literacy is 65%. In Visavadar, 12% of the population is under 6 years of age.

The former Chief Minister of Gujarat and the founder of Gujarat Parivartan Party, Keshubhai Patel fought 2012 state assembly election from Visavadar Constituency.

== Holy places ==
Satadhar is a holy place dedicated to Aapa Giga, the famous Saint of Visavadar.

Tulsishyam (Famous for 'Garam Pani no Zaro' (Hot Springs)) is situated near Visavadar.

Kankai (gir) located in mid of Jungle is only 32 km away from Visavadar.

Mauni Ashram is another holy place near Visavadar to visit.

== Education ==
In addition to government primary schools, Visavadar has several private schools: Shree V. D. Patel Saikshanik Sankul Mandavad, Navyug Vidyalaya, Vivekanand Primary School, Nobel School, Bharmal School, Vishvambhari Vidhya Sankul.

At the high school level, there are separate schools for males and females. Female students can study in N.C. Parmar Girls High School, while male students can attend Nagar Panchayat High School (Municipal Corporation) or Swaminarayan Gurukul.

The only college in Visavadar is the Devmani Arts and Commerce College.

There is also a public library in Visavadar.

Visavadar is the gateway to Sasan Gir Forest, known for Great Asiatic Lions.
