= J. Mahapatra =

Indian police chief

J. Mahapatra (born 1 February 1948) is an Indian Police Service (IPS) officer who served as the police commissioner of the city of Ahmedabad in western India between December 2006 and October 2007. Mahapatra is from the state of Orissa and is an IPS officer of the 1974 cadre. He has also served as the police commissioner of Vadodara and as Additional Director General of CID (intelligence) in the government.

Preceded by K. R. Kaushik	Police commissioner of Ahmedabad; December 2006 – October 2007	Succeeded by S. K. Saikia
