= Jayrajsinh Jadeja =

Indian politician and murderer

Jayrajsinh Jadeja is a convicted murderer from the state of Gujarat. A member of the Bharatiya Janata Party, he was elected to the Gujarat Legislative Assembly representing Gondal. His son, Ganesh Jadeja has been alleged to play a role in death of a Rajasthani youth in Gondal.

== Early life ==
Jayrajsinh was born in Gujarat and his father, Temubha Jadeja, was a farmer.

== Criminal history ==
In 2017, the Gujarat High Court convicted Jadeja for the 2004 murder of property dealer Nilesh Raiyani in Gondal, sentencing them to life imprisonment. The case stemmed from a dispute over a 35-acre heritage property, with eyewitnesses testifying that Jadeja fired the fatal shots. Although acquitted by a fast-track court in 2010, the High Court overturned this decision, and Jadeja’s appeal remains pending in the Supreme Court, with him out on bail as of 2021.

In 2012, Jadeja faced allegations of assault and rioting in Nagadka village, Gondal, following a clash with supporters of rival Gordhan Zadafia, but was acquitted in 2021 due to insufficient evidence.

In March 2025, Jayrajsinh Jadeja’s son, Ganesh Jadeja, was accused of involvement in the death of Rajkumar Jat, a UPSC aspirant from Bhilwara, Rajasthan. Rajkumar, who had been preparing for civil service examinations in Rajkot, Gujarat, went missing on 2 March 2025, following an alleged altercation with security personnel outside the residence of Gondal MLA Geetaba Jadeja, Jayrajsinh’s wife. His body was discovered on 4 March 2025, on the Rajkot-Ahmedabad Highway and identified days later.

Rajkumar’s father alleged that Ganesh Jadeja and his associates were responsible for his son’s death, claiming it was a murder rather than an accident. The case sparked protests in Bhilwara and demands for a CBI investigation from political figures, including Hanuman Beniwal and Ummeda Ram Beniwal.
