= Hardik Patel =

Indian politician (born 1993)

Member of Gujarat Legislative Assembly
- Incumbent
- Assumed office 8 December 2022
- Preceded by: Lakhabhai Bharwad
- Constituency: Viramgam

Personal details
- Born: 20 July 1993 (age 33) Viramgam, Gujarat, India
- Party: Bharatiya Janata Party (since 2022)
- Other political affiliations: Indian National Congress (2017–2022)
- Spouse: Kinjal Patel (m. 2019)
- Education: Gujarat University (Bachelor of Commerce)
- Known for: Patidar reservation

Hardik Bharatbhai Patel (born 20 July 1993) is an Indian politician. He rose to prominence in July 2015, where he led the Patidar reservation agitation that sought Other Backward Class (OBC) status for the Patidar caste.

He joined the Indian National Congress (INC) in 2020. He served as the Working President of the Gujarat Pradesh Congress Committee, the state unit of INC in Gujarat. He left the party and eventually joined the Bharatiya Janata Party in 2022.

== Early life ==
Hardik Patel was born on 20 July 1993 in a Gujarati Patidar family to Bharat and Usha Patel. In 2004, his parents moved to Viramgam. Hardik studied from Class VI to Class VIII at Divya Jyot School in Viramgam, before moving to K B Shah Vinay Mandir, where he studied until Class XII. He was a poor student and a cricket enthusiast. After completing Class XII, Hardik started helping his father, Bharat, to run a small business of fixing submersible pumps in underground water wells. Bharat was a Congress worker.

In 2010, Patel joined Sahajanand College in Ahmedabad. He ran for the post of general secretary of the college students' union and was elected unopposed. In 2013, he received Bachelor of Commerce (B.Com.) degree.

== Activism ==
On 31 October 2012, Hardik Patel joined the Sardar Patel Group (SPG), a Patidar youth body, and within less than a month, became president of its Viramgam unit. In 2015, Hardik Patel was ousted from his post after a conflict with the SPG leader, Lalji Patel.

In July 2015 Patel's sister, Monica, failed to qualify for a state government scholarship. He was upset when Monica's friend qualified for the same scholarship through the Other Backward Class (OBC) quota even though she had scored lower marks. Recognizing that affirmative policies were benefiting other castes but not Patidars, Patel formed the Patidar Anamat Andolan Samiti (PAAS) which claims to be an apolitical organization that aims to get Patidars included in the OBC quota.

With support of PAAS, Patel led the Patidar reservation agitation starting July 2015. He organized several rallies across Gujarat. On 25 August 2015, a large number of Patidars from all over Gujarat gathered at GMDC ground, Ahmedabad for a rally. That evening, he was briefly arrested by Ahmedabad City Police when he went on fast after a rally held earlier in the day had dispersed. Violent protests broke out in response, forcing the Government of Gujarat to impose a curfew and call in the Indian Army. He continued to lead the agitation until 2019.

In 2016, Patel's close aides Chirag Patel and Ketan Patel have alleged he misused Patidar community's fund for living a "luxurious" life.

=== Lawsuits ===
On 18 October 2015, Patel was booked for insulting the National Flag of India, in a case registered in Rajkot. He was briefly detained for trying to disrupt the One Day International cricket match between India and South Africa. On 19 October 2015, Patel was booked in Surat under the charges of sedition over alleged remarks about 'killing cops'. Subsequently, he was imprisoned. On 15 July 2016, Patel was granted bail on the condition that he would stay out of the state for six months and out of Mehsana for nine months. He moved to Udaipur for this period. He was arrested again on 18 January 2020 for failing to appear before a trial court here in a 2015 sedition case, hours after a warrant was issued against him.

On 25 July 2018, Patel was found guilty of rioting, arson, damage to property and unlawful assembly. The three were fined Rs. 50,000 apart from the two-year imprisonment. He appealed the order and could not contest in the 2019 Indian general election pending the outcome of the appeal. On 12 April 2022, the Supreme Court stayed the order of his conviction, until his appeal against the conviction was decided. The stay would allow him to contest the election.

On 9 May 2022, the city sessions court allowed withdrawal of rioting charge against him.

== Political career ==
Patel backed the campaign of the Indian National Congress (INC) in the 2017 Gujarat Legislative Assembly election. In November 2017, a sex tape of Patel was released on social media and went viral. Patel said that he was a victim of dirty politics and the video only proved that he is not impotent. On 12 March 2019, he joined the INC. During campaigning for the 2019 Indian general election, he made comments against people of Nepal which were described as racist while targeting incumbent Prime Minister Narendra Modi.

He was appointed the Working President of Gujarat Pradesh Congress Committee, the state unit of INC, on 11 July 2020. He accused the leadership of INC and he praised the BJP and was expelled from the party on May 16, 2022 for anti-party activities.

After being in strident opposition to the Bharatiya Janata Party for years, he eventually joined them on 2 June 2022.

He was fielded as BJP candidate for Viramgam Assembly constituency for 2022 Gujarat Legislative Assembly election on 10 November 2022 and was elected. In 2023, Hardik Patel urged Minister of Culture, G. Kishan Reddy, to restore Munsar Lake in Gujarat's Viramgam and requested the appointment of an Archaeological Survey of India (ASI) team for its maintenance.

== Personal life ==
Hardik Patel married his childhood friend Kinjal Parikh on 27 January 2019 in Digsar of Muli taluka, Surendranagar district, Gujarat.
