= Nanubhai =

Nanubhai is an Indian given name. Notable people with the name include:

- Nanubhai Patel (1905–?), Indian politician
- Nanubhai Vanani (born 1956), Indian politician
- Nanubhai Vakil (1902–1980), Indian film director
