= 2025 elections in India =

2025 Indian elections
- ← 2023 2024 2025 2026 2027 →

Vice presidential election
- Electoral vote
- C. P. Radhakrishnan: 452
- B. Sudershan Reddy: 300

Rajya Sabha elections
- Overall control: NDA hold
- Seats contested: 14
- Net seat change: NDA +2

State elections
- States contested: 2
- Net state change: NDA +1

State by-elections
- Seats contested: 15
- Net seat change: NDA +1

The 2025 elections in India includes the election to the office of the vice president of India, Rajya Sabha, state legislative assemblies, rural and urban local bodies.

== Vice presidential election ==
The vice presidential election was held on 9 September 2025 following the early resignation of Jagdeep Dhankhar. The votes were counted on the same day and C. P. Radhakrishnan was elected as the next Vice president of India.

Date	Before election		After election	
Date	Vice President	Party	Vice President	Party
9 September 2025	Jagdeep Dhankhar	Bharatiya Janata Party	C. P. Radhakrishnan	Bharatiya Janata Party

== Rajya Sabha elections ==
Elections for 14 seats in the Rajya Sabha were held on 19 June and 24 October 2025.

Date	Election	Majority before	Majority after
June - October 2025	Rajya Sabha	National Democratic Alliance	National Democratic Alliance

== State Assembly elections ==
Date(s)	State/UT	Before election		After election		Maps
Date(s)	State/UT	Parties	CM	Parties	CM	Maps
5 February 2025	Delhi	Aam Aadmi Party	Atishi Marlena	Bharatiya Janata Party	Rekha Gupta	
6–11 November 2025	Bihar	Janata Dal (United)	Nitish Kumar	Janata Dal (United)	Nitish Kumar	

== State Assembly by-elections ==
=== Gujarat ===
Date	Constituency		Previous MLA		Reason	Elected MLA	
19 June 2025	24	Kadi	Karshan Solanki	Bharatiya Janata Party	Died on 4 February 2025	Rajendra Chavda	Bharatiya Janata Party
19 June 2025	87	Visavadar	Bhupendra Bhayani	Aam Aadmi Party	Resigned on 13 December 2023	Gopal Italia	Aam Aadmi Party

=== Jammu and Kashmir ===
Date	Constituency		Previous MLA		Reason	Elected MLA	
11 November 2025	27	Budgam	Omar Abdullah	Jammu & Kashmir National Conference	Resigned on 21 October 2024	Aga Syed Muntazir Mehdi	Jammu and Kashmir People's Democratic Party
11 November 2025	77	Nagrota	Devender Singh Rana	Bharatiya Janata Party	Died on 31 October 2024	Devyani Rana	Bharatiya Janata Party

=== Jharkhand ===
Date	Constituency		Previous MLA		Reason	Elected MLA	
11 November 2025	45	Ghatshila	Ramdas Soren	Jharkhand Mukti Morcha	Died on 15 August 2025	Somesh Chandra Soren	Jharkhand Mukti Morcha

=== Kerala ===
Date	Constituency		Previous MLA		Reason	Elected MLA	
19 June 2025	84	Nilambur	P. V. Anvar	Independent	Resigned on 13 January 2025	Aryadan Shoukath	Indian National Congress

=== Mizoram ===
Date	Constituency		Previous MLA		Reason	Elected MLA	
11 November 2025	2	Dampa	Lalrintluanga Sailo	Mizo National Front	Died on 21 July 2025	R. Lalthangliana	Mizo National Front

=== Odisha ===
Date	Constituency		Previous MLA		Reason	Elected MLA	
11 November 2025	71	Nuapada	Rajendra Dholakia	Biju Janata Dal	Died on 8 September 2025	Jay Dholakia	Bharatiya Janata Party

=== Punjab ===
Date	Constituency		Previous MLA		Reason	Elected MLA	
19 June 2025	64	Ludhiana West	Gurpreet Gogi	Aam Aadmi Party	Died on 10 January 2025	Sanjeev Arora	Aam Aadmi Party
11 November 2025	21	Tarn Taran	Kashmir Singh Sohal	Aam Aadmi Party	Died on 27 June 2025	Harmeet Singh Sandhu	Aam Aadmi Party

=== Rajasthan ===
Date	Constituency		Previous MLA		Reason	Elected MLA	
11 November 2025	193	Anta	Kanwar Lal Meena	Bharatiya Janata Party	Disqualified on 23 May 2025	Pramod Jain Bhaya	Indian National Congress

=== Tamil Nadu ===
Date	Constituency		Previous MLA		Reason	Elected MLA	
5 February 2025	98	Erode East	E. V. K. S. Elangovan	Indian National Congress	Died on 14 December 2024	V. C. Chandhirakumar	Dravida Munnetra Kazhagam

=== Telangana ===
Date	Constituency		Previous MLA		Reason	Elected MLA	
11 November 2025	61	Jubilee Hills	Maganti Gopinath	Bharat Rashtra Samithi	Died on 8 June 2025	Naveen Yadav Vallala	Indian National Congress

=== Uttar Pradesh ===
Date	Constituency		Previous MLA		Reason	Elected MLA	
5 February 2025	273	Milkipur	Awadhesh Prasad	Samajwadi Party	Resigned on 12 June 2024	Chandrabhanu Paswan	Bharatiya Janata Party

=== West Bengal ===
Date	Constituency		Previous MLA		Reason	Elected MLA	
19 June 2025	80	Kaliganj	Nasiruddin Ahamed	Trinamool Congress	Died on 1 February 2025	Alifa Ahmed	Trinamool Congress

== Municipal Corporation elections ==
=== Arunachal Pradesh ===
Date	Municipal Corporation	Government before	Government after
15 December 2025	Itanagar	Bharatiya Janata Party	Bharatiya Janata Party

=== Chhattisgarh ===
Date	Municipal Corporation	Government before	Government after
11 February 2025	Ambikapur	Indian National Congress	Bharatiya Janata Party
11 February 2025	Bilaspur	Indian National Congress	Bharatiya Janata Party
11 February 2025	Chirmiri	Indian National Congress	Bharatiya Janata Party
11 February 2025	Dhamtari	Indian National Congress	Bharatiya Janata Party
11 February 2025	Durg	Indian National Congress	Bharatiya Janata Party
11 February 2025	Jagdalpur	Indian National Congress	Bharatiya Janata Party
11 February 2025	Korba	Indian National Congress	Bharatiya Janata Party
11 February 2025	Raigarh	Indian National Congress	Bharatiya Janata Party
11 February 2025	Raipur	Indian National Congress	Bharatiya Janata Party
11 February 2025	Rajnandgaon	Indian National Congress	Bharatiya Janata Party

=== Gujarat ===
Date	Municipal Corporation	Government before	Government after
16 February 2025	Junagadh	Bharatiya Janata Party	Bharatiya Janata Party

=== Haryana ===
Date	Municipal Corporation	Government before	Government after
2 & 9 March 2025	Manesar	Did not exist	Independent
2 & 9 March 2025	Gurugram	Bharatiya Janata Party	Bharatiya Janata Party
2 & 9 March 2025	Faridabad	Bharatiya Janata Party	Bharatiya Janata Party
2 & 9 March 2025	Rohtak	Bharatiya Janata Party	Bharatiya Janata Party
2 & 9 March 2025	Karnal	Bharatiya Janata Party	Bharatiya Janata Party
2 & 9 March 2025	Hisar	Bharatiya Janata Party	Bharatiya Janata Party
2 & 9 March 2025	Yamunanagar	Bharatiya Janata Party	Bharatiya Janata Party
2 & 9 March 2025	Panipat	Bharatiya Janata Party	Bharatiya Janata Party

=== Kerala ===
Date	Municipal Corporation	Government before	Government after
9 & 11 December 2025	Kozhikode	Communist Party of India (Marxist)	Communist Party of India (Marxist)
9 & 11 December 2025	Thiruvananthapuram	Communist Party of India (Marxist)	Bharatiya Janata Party
9 & 11 December 2025	Kochi	Communist Party of India (Marxist)	Indian National Congress
9 & 11 December 2025	Kollam	Communist Party of India (Marxist)	Indian National Congress
9 & 11 December 2025	Thrissur	Communist Party of India (Marxist)	Indian National Congress
9 & 11 December 2025	Kannur	Indian National Congress	Indian National Congress

=== Uttarakhand ===
Date	Municipal Corporation	Government before	Government after
23 January 2025	Dehradun	Bharatiya Janata Party	Bharatiya Janata Party
23 January 2025	Haldwani	Bharatiya Janata Party	Bharatiya Janata Party
23 January 2025	Kashipur	Bharatiya Janata Party	Bharatiya Janata Party
23 January 2025	Rishikesh	Bharatiya Janata Party	Bharatiya Janata Party
23 January 2025	Rudrapur	Bharatiya Janata Party	Bharatiya Janata Party
23 January 2025	Haridwar	Indian National Congress	Bharatiya Janata Party
23 January 2025	Kotdwar	Indian National Congress	Bharatiya Janata Party
23 January 2025	Roorkee	Independent	Bharatiya Janata Party
23 January 2025	Pithoragarh	Did Not Exist	Bharatiya Janata Party
23 January 2025	Almora	Did Not Exist	Bharatiya Janata Party
23 January 2025	Srinagar	Did Not Exist	Independent

== Autonomous District Council elections ==
=== Assam ===
Date	Autonomous council	Government before	Government after
2 April 2025	Rabha Hasong	Rabha Hasong Joutha Mancha	Rabha Hasong Joutha Mancha
22 September 2025	Bodoland	United People's Party Liberal	Bodoland People's Front

=== Meghalaya ===
Date	Autonomous council	Government before	Government after
21 February 2025	Jaintia Hills	National People's Party	National People's Party
21 February 2025	Khasi Hills	National People's Party	Voice of the People Party

=== Mizoram ===
Date	Autonomous council	Government before	Government after
3 December 2025	Lai	Bharatiya Janata Party	Zoram People's Movement

== See also ==
- 2024 elections in India
- 2025 Rajya Sabha elections
- 2026 elections in India
- list of elections in 2025
