= Katargam Assembly constituency =

Legislative Assembly constituency in Gujarat State, India

Coordinates: 21.23°N 72.83°E

Katargam
- Constituency No. 166 for the Gujarat Legislative Assembly

Constituency details
- Country: India
- Region: Western India
- State: Gujarat
- District: Surat
- Lok Sabha constituency: Surat
- Established: 2008
- Total electors: 322,246
- Reservation: None

Member of Legislative Assembly
- 15th Gujarat Legislative Assembly
- Incumbent Vinod Moradiya
- Party: Bharatiya Janata Party
- Elected year: 2017

Katargam is one of the 182 Legislative Assembly constituencies of Gujarat state in India. It is part of Surat district and came into existence after 2008 delimitation.

== List of segments ==
This assembly seat represents the following segments,

1. Surat City Taluka (Part) – Surat Municipal Corporation (Part) Ward No. – 38, 39, 40, 41, 42.

== Members of Legislative Assembly ==
Year	Member	Party
2012	Nanubhai Vanani	Bharatiya Janata Party
2017	Vinod Amarshibhai Moradiya	Bharatiya Janata Party
2022	Vinod Amarshibhai Moradiya	Bharatiya Janata Party

== Election results ==
=== 2022 ===
Gujarat Legislative Assembly Election, 2022: Katargam
Party	Candidate	Votes	%	±%
BJP	Vinod Moradiya	120,505	58.2	▼11.3%
AAP	Gopal Italia	55,878	27.0%	▲27%
INC	Variya Kalpesh	26,828	13.0%	▼12.58%

=== 2017 ===
Gujarat Legislative Assembly Election, 2017: Katargam
Party	Candidate	Votes	%	±%
BJP	Vinod Moradiya	125,387	69.5	
INC	Jignesh Jivani (Mevasa)	46,157	25.58	
Majority			43.92	
Turnout		1,80,417	65.01	
BJP hold		Swing		

=== 2012 ===
Gujarat Assembly Election, 2012
Party	Candidate	Votes	%	±%
BJP	Nanubhai Vanani	88604	53.41	
INC	Nandlal Pandav	45332	27.33	
Majority		43272	26.09	
Turnout		165887	68.74	
BJP win (new seat)				

== See also ==
- List of constituencies of Gujarat Legislative Assembly
- Gujarat Legislative Assembly
