= Kanu Bhalala =

Indian politician

Member of the Gujarat Legislative Assembly
- In office 2002–2012
- Preceded by: Keshubhai Patel
- Succeeded by: Keshubhai Patel
- Constituency: Visavadar

Personal details
- Party: Bhartiya Janata Party

Kanu Bhalala was a Member of Legislative assembly from Visavadar constituency in Gujarat for its 12th legislative assembly.
