= Geetaba Jadeja =

Indian politician

Geetaba Jayrajsinh Jadeja (born 1968) is an Indian politician from Gujarat. She is a member of the Gujarat Legislative Assembly from Gondal Assembly constituency in Rajkot district. She won the 2022 Gujarat Legislative Assembly election representing the Bharatiya Janata Party.

== Early life and education ==
Jadeja is from Gondal, Rajkot district, Gujarat. She is the wife of former two time MLA Jayrajsinh Jadeja. She studied Class 10 at Mondhiba Girls High School, Gondal and passed the SSC examinations in 1985.

== Career ==
Jadeja won from Gondal Assembly constituency representing Bharatiya Janata Party in the 2022 Gujarat Legislative Assembly election. She polled 86,062 votes and defeated her nearest rival, Shivlal Barasia of the Aam Admi Party, by a margin of 78,864 votes. She first became an MLA winning the 2017 Gujarat Legislative Assembly election defeating Khatariya Arjunbhai Ghanshyambhai of the Indian National Congress by a margin of 15,397.

== Controversy ==
In June 2024, her son Jyotiradityasinh, also known as Ganesh, was arrested for alleged rioting and atrocities against a scheduled caste student leader following Kshatriya-Dalit tensions which broke out in Rajkot. He was later granted bail by the Gujarat High Court in October 2024.

In March 2025, Ganesh Jadeja, was accused of involvement in the death of Rajkumar Jat, who went missing on 2 March 2025, following an alleged altercation with security personnel outside the residence of Gondal MLA Geetaba Jadeja. His body was discovered on 4 March 2025 and Rajkumar’s father, Ratanlal, alleged that Ganesh Jadeja and his associates were responsible for his son’s death.
