= Tejashree Patel =

Indian politician

Tejashree Dilipkumar Patel

Member of the Gujarat Legislative Assembly
- In office 2012–2017
- Constituency: Viramgam

Personal details
- Party: Indian National Congress (2000–2017); Bharatiya Janata Party (2017–)

Tejashree Dilipkumar Patel is an Indian politician from Gujarat, India.

== Career ==
Patel has studied MD (Gynecology) from the NHL Municipal Medical College, Ahmedabad. She is a practising gynecologist.

As her husband Dilipkumar Patel was an Indian National Congress (INC) member and Viramgam City President in 1997, she was in politics. In 2000, she was elected to the district panchayat from Viramgam taluka. She served as the chairperson in district panchayat for five years; as the standing committee chairperson for 2.5 years, and as the head of the district health committee for another 2.5 years. She contested 2007 Gujarat legislative assembly election from Viramgam Assembly constituency as a member of Indian National Congress (INC) and lost by a narrow margin of 677 votes to Bharatiya Janata Party (BJP) candidate.

She was elected to Gujarat Legislative Assembly from Viramgam in 2012 election as a member of INC defeating BJP candidate Pragjibhai Patel by a margin of 16,983 votes. She left INC and joined BJP in July 2017. She contested 2017 Gujarat legislative assembly election from Viramgam where she was defeated by INC candidate Lakhabhai Bharwad.
