= Kama Rathod =

Indian politician

Kamabhai Rathod

Member of the Gujarat Legislative Assembly
- In office 2007–2012
- Preceded by: Vaju Dodiya
- Succeeded by: Tejashree Patel
- Constituency: Viramgam

Personal details
- Party: Bhartiya Janata Party

Kama Rathod is a Member of Legislative assembly from Viramgam constituency in Gujarat for its 12th legislative assembly.
