= Suresh Mehta =

Indian politician

11th Chief Minister of Gujarat
- In office 21 October 1995 – 19 September 1996
- Preceded by: Keshubhai Patel
- Succeeded by: Shankersinh Vaghela

Personal details
- Born: Sureshchandra Mehta; 5 August 1936 (age 90) Mandvi, Cutch State, British India (now in Gujarat, India)
- Party: Bharatiya Jana Sangh; Bharatiya Janata Party (1980-2007); Gujarat Parivartan Party (2012-2014)

Suresh Mehta (born 5 August 1936) is an Indian politician and former Chief Minister of Gujarat from 1995 to 1996.

== Biography ==
=== Early life ===
Suresh Mehta was born on 5 August 1936 at Mandvi, Cutch State (now in Kachchh District, Gujarat, India).

=== Political career ===
He was a member of the Bharatiya Janata Party (BJP). He was elected to Gujarat Vidhan Sabha from Mandvi in Kachchh area in 1975 (w Jana Sangh), 1985, 1990, 1995, 1998. He lost the seat in 2002 elections.

He served as the cabinet minister when Keshubhai Patel formed the government in the 1995 assembly elections. Keshubhai Patel resigned in October 1995 following revolt of his colleague Shankersinh Vaghela and consequently, Mehta was sworn in as the Chief Minister in October 1995 and he served till September 1996. However, BJP was split as the Rashtriya Janata Party which was formed by Vaghela. Mehta resigned from post of the CM and the President's rule was imposed. He again served as the industry cabinet minister under Patel when the BJP returned to the power in the 1998 assembly elections.

Patel resigned in 2001 following allegations of mismanagement in relief works during the aftermath of the 2001 Bhuj earthquake and a loss of BJP seats in by-elections. Narendra Modi succeeded Patel under whom Mehta had reservations to serve as the cabinet minister but he served until 2002.

He opposed leadership of Narendra Modi and quit BJP on 8 December 2007, just before the 2007 Gujarat Legislative Assembly election. Later he joined the Gujarat Parivartan Party (GPP) founded by the former chief minister Keshubhai Patel in 2012. He opposed the GPP's merger with the BJP in February 2014 and left the party.
