= Gopal Italia =

Indian politician and social activist

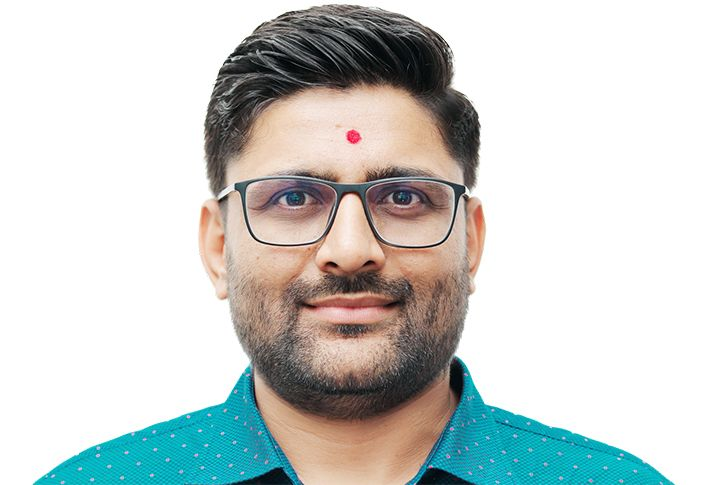
- Gopal in 2020

Member of Legislative Assembly, Gujarat
- Incumbent
- Assumed office 23 June 2025
- Preceded by: Bhupendra Bhayani
- Constituency: Visavadar

Joint General Secretary of Aam Aadmi Party
- Incumbent
- Assumed office 4 January 2023

President of Aam Aadmi Party, Gujarat
- In office 12 December 2020 – 4 January 2023

Personal details
- Born: 21 July 1989 (age 37) Botad,
- Citizenship: India
- Party: Aam Aadmi Party
- Education: Gujarat University
- Occupation: Social activist, politician
- Known for: Kayda Katha; Patidar reservation agitation

Gopalbhai Gordhanbhai Italia, popularly known as Gopal Italia (born 21 July 1989) is an Indian politician and social activist from Gujarat. He was elected from Visavadar constituency of Gujarat Legislative Assembly in 2025 by-elections. He was a former police constable and a leader of the Patidar reservation agitation. From December 2020 to January 2023, he was the Convener (State president) of Aam Aadmi Party in Gujarat.

== Early life ==
Italia was born on 21 July 1989 in Botad in Gujarat, India. He completed his primary studies at Timbi village in Umrala Taluka of Bhavnagar district and his secondary studies at Dhola village. He completed his BA in political science from a college affiliated with Gujarat University, Ahmedabad in 2016 and later did LLB at Saurashtra University and passed out in 2020.

== Career ==
From January 2013, Italia worked as a constable in Madhupura Police Station in Ahmedabad Police till 2016. He then in 2014 as a Revenue Clerk posted at the office of Dhandhuka taluka Sub-Divisional Magistrate under Ahmedabad Collectorate. He campaigns for the rights of unemployed youth as well as the rights of citizens.

In 2017, Italia served as a government employee. His complaint to the then deputy chief minister Nitin Patel about open violation of the alcohol prohibition policy went viral on social media. He was alleged to have impersonated as a policeman and was charged under Section 120 of the Indian Penal Code in the incident. In March 2017, he was suspended after allegedly hurling a shoe at Minister of State for Home Pradeepsinh Jadeja. Later In 2017, he resigned from his government job. Italia and others also spent 10 days in prison in a case where they did a protest against a BJP leader.

=== Social activism ===
As member of the Botad Patidar Anamat Andolan Samiti, he took part in the Patidar reservation agitation. He was with Gujarat and District Patidar Andolan Samiti. He was close to Hardik Patel during the Patidar reservation agitation 2015. He created awareness about the constitutional law.

In November 2018, in a live video on Facebook, Italia fired shots into the air with a plastic gun to demonstrate the new contraption made by farmers. In January 2019, Gopal was arrested under the Arms Act for shooting a plastic gun.

=== Aam Aadmi Party ===
In June 2020, Italia joined Gujarat state unit of Aam Aadmi Party (AAP) as the State Vice President. He was appointed the State President on 12 December 2020.

After the February 2021 Gujarat local body elections. where AAP won 27 seats in the Surat Municipal Corporation and one in the Gandhinagar Municipal Corporation, he was re-appointed as the president of AAP Gujarat in 2022. In the 2022 Gujarat Legislative Assembly election the party received 12.92% vote with 5 seats.

He was elected from Visavadar constituency of Gujarat Legislative Assembly, defeating his closest rival by over 17000 votes, in June 2025 by-elections.

== Controversies ==
BJP protested against Italia over a comment, he allegedly made hurting the Hindu sentiments and faced protests in August 2022.

In August 2021, Italia visited a temple in Unjha taluka as part of the AAP's outreach programme. He was arrested by the Mehsana police in a case filed in December 2020 against him for holding a public meeting and demonstration in Mehsana without prior police permission. AAP members staged a protest outside the police station and alleged the arrest was due to political vendetta by the BJP state government. In the evening, Italia was released on bail.

In the first half of October, a video of Italia went viral in which he called Prime Minister Narendra Modi, 'neech' (a lowly person). The National Commission for Women has issued a notice to Gopal Italia and summoned him to appear before commission on 13 October in Delhi. On 13 October, the Delhi Police detained Italia from the office of the National Commission for Women, and taken to the police station where he was questioned for 2.5 hours.
