= Viramgam Assembly constituency =

Legislative Assembly constituency in Gujarat State, India

Coordinates: 23.13°N 72.05°E

Viramgam
- Constituency No. 39 for the Gujarat Legislative Assembly

Constituency details
- Country: India
- Region: Western India
- State: Gujarat
- District: Ahmedabad
- Lok Sabha constituency: Surendranagar
- Established: 1972
- Total electors: 302,819
- Reservation: None

Member of Legislative Assembly
- 15th Gujarat Legislative Assembly
- Incumbent Hardikbhai Bharatbhai Patel
- Party: Bharatiya Janata Party
- Elected year: 2022

Viramgam is one of the 182 Legislative Assembly constituencies of Gujarat state in India. It is part of Ahmedabad district.

== List of segments ==
This assembly seat represents the following segments,

1. Viramgam Taluka
2. Detroj-Rampura Taluka
3. Mandal Taluka

== Members of Legislative Assembly ==
Year	Member	Political Party
1995	Jayantibhai Machchar	Bharatiya Janata Party
1998	Premjibhai Vadlani	Indian National Congress
2002	Vajubhai Parmabhai Dodiya	Bharatiya Janata Party
2007	Kama Rathod	Bharatiya Janata Party
2012	Tejashree Patel	Indian National Congress
2017	Lakhabhai Bharwad	Indian National Congress
2022	Hardik Patel	Bharatiya Janata Party

== Election results ==
=== 2022 ===
Gujarat Legislative Assembly Election, 2022: Viramgam
Party	Candidate	Votes	%	±%
BJP	Hardik Patel	99,155	49.64	+8.39
AAP	Amarsinh Thakor	47,448	23.75	New
INC	Lakhabhai Bharwad	42,724	21.39	−19.86
Majority		51707	25.89	
Turnout		199754		
Registered electors		298,901		
BJP gain from INC		Swing		

=== 2017 ===
Gujarat Legislative Assembly Election, 2017: Viramgam
Party	Candidate	Votes	%	±%
INC	Lakhabhai Bharwad	76,178	41.25	−11.51
BJP	Tejashree Patel	69,630	37.71	−4.5
IND.	Dhruvkumar Jadav	12,069	6.54	
IND.	Kunvarji Thakor	10,836	5.87	
Majority		6,548	3.54	
Turnout		1,84,653	68.10	
INC hold		Swing		

=== 2012 ===
Gujarat Assembly Election, 2012
Party	Candidate	Votes	%	±%
INC	Tejashree Patel	84,930	52.76	+8.44
BJP	Pragjibhai Naranbhai Patel	67,947	42.21	−5.43
Majority		16,983	10.55	+7.23
Turnout		1,60,985	66.74	
INC gain from BJP		Swing		

=== 2007 ===
Gujarat Assembly Election, 2007
Party	Candidate	Votes	%	±%
BJP	Kamabhai Rathod	47,643	47.64	−3.83
INC	Jagdishbhai Somabhai Koli Patel	44,327	44.32	−4.21
IND.	Navghanbhai Mangabhai Patel	3,364	3.36	
BSP	Abdullahbhai Pirmahamad Shaikh	3,286	3.29	
IND.	Manharbhai Makanbhai Gami	1,390	1.39	
Majority		3,316	3.32	−0.22
Turnout		1,00,010		
BJP hold		Swing		

=== 2002 ===
Gujarat Assembly Election, 2002
Party	Candidate	Votes	%	±%
BJP	Vajubhai Parmabhai Dodiya	53,766	51.47	
INC	Premjibhai Shivabhai Vadlani	50,702	48.53	
Majority		6,548	3.54	
Turnout		1,04,468	67.11	

== See also ==
- List of constituencies of the Gujarat Legislative Assembly
- Ahmedabad district
