= Varachha =

Surties in Surat, Gujarat, India

Varachha East Zone of Surat Municipal Corporation
- Suburb
- Location in Gujarat, India
- Coordinates: 21.204234°N 72.859516°E
- Country: India
- State: Gujarat
- District: Surat

Government
  - Body: SMC

Languages
  - Official: Gujarati, Hindi
- Time zone: UTC+5:30 (IST)
- Telephone code: 0261
- Vehicle registration: GJ 5
- Website: www.suratmunicipal.gov.in

Varachha is a Suburb in Surat city and host of the Surat Diamond and embroidery Industry. The people of Saurashtra of Western Gujarat moved away from their rain-starved native to Surat in search for income generation and survival almost four decades ago. Since then Saurashtrians have considered Surat as their home land. After coming to Surat, some individuals began trading business while majority of them entered into labour front in a phased manner. The population of the people involved in diamond trade and embroidery market belonging to Saurashtra increased to a sizeable extent in Surat particularly in the area of Varachha.

== Growth of Diamond Industry at Varachha ==
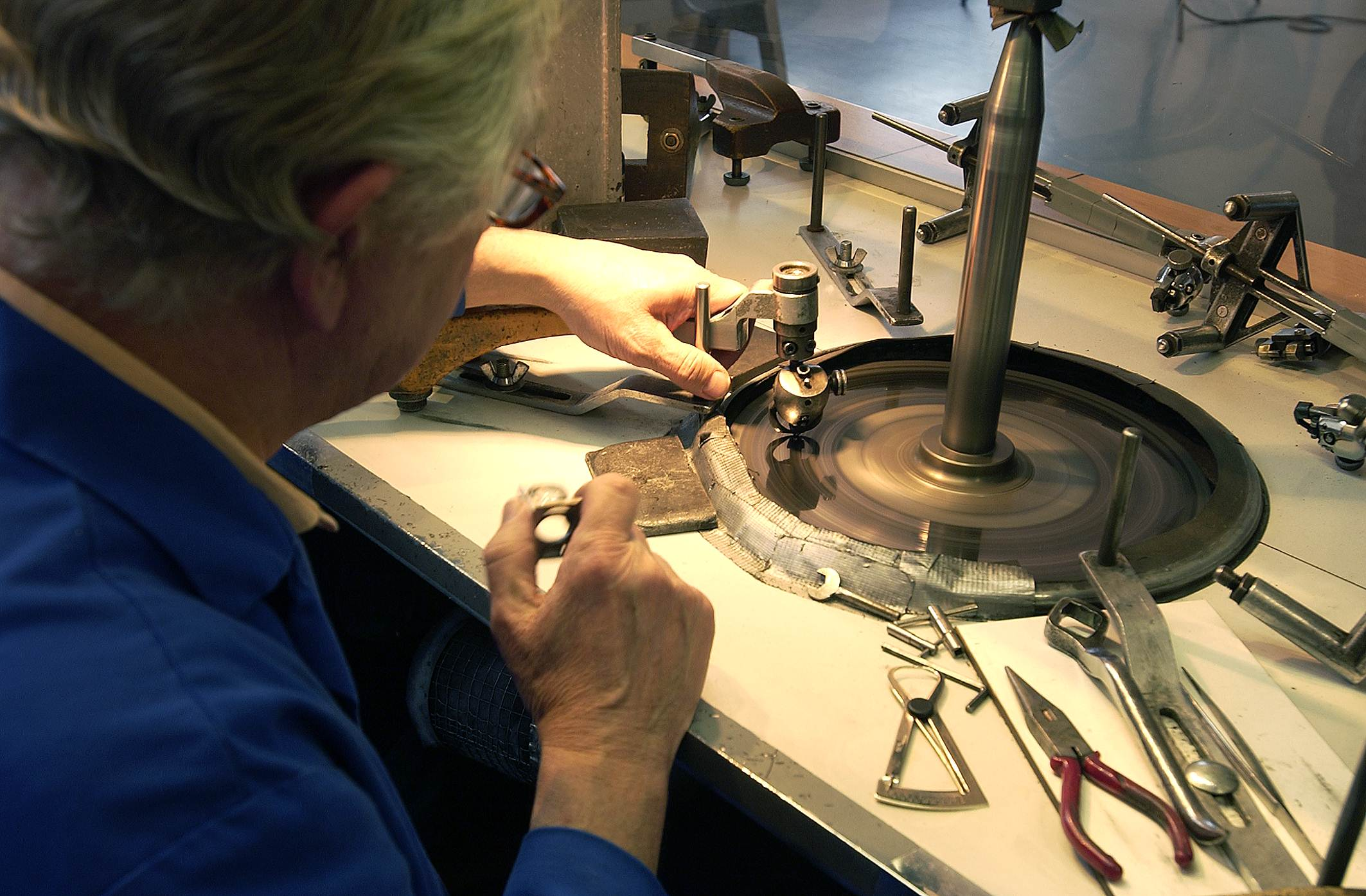
Diamond polisher

Varachha area is a major hub of diamond cutting and polishing. The primary workforce in this industry comprises individuals from the Saurashtra region of Gujarat. Driven by strong demand from the American market from the early 1970s to the mid-1980s, with only a brief downturn in 1979, Surat's diamond industry experienced significant growth. Today, the majority of diamond polishing workshops are located in the Varachha area of Surat, predominantly operated by members of the Patel community. Notably, Surat is responsible for polishing eight out of every ten diamonds worldwide. Eight from ten diamond of world are polished in Surat city.

== See also ==
- List of tourist attractions in Surat
