= Ekta Yatra =

Name of two political yatras in India

Ekta Yatra (English: National Integration Rally) is the name of two political yatras or rallies led by the Bharatiya Janata Party (BJP) in India. The first began in 1991, following the 1990 Ram Rath Yatra. The second began in 2011. Each rally travelled through various Indian states and ended with the unfurling of the flag of India in what was then the state of Jammu and Kashmir.

== 1991 Ekta Yatra ==
The 1991 Ekta Yatra was led by BJP President Murli Manohar Joshi and was intended to signal that BJP supported national unity and opposed separatist movements. It commenced on 11 December 1991 in Kanyakumari, Tamil Nadu, coinciding with the birth anniversary of Subramania Bharati and the ‘Balidan Diwas’ of Guru Tegh Bahadur. The Yatra visited 14 states. Other notable participants included Narendra Modi, who helped organize the rally, and Anandiben Patel. The motorcade of hundreds of vehicles was stopped at Patnitop beyond Jammu on 25 January 1992. The rally's final stop to hoist the Indian flag in Jammu and Kashmir on 26 January 1992 was considered to have minimal success, as few locals participated. Murli Manohar Joshi made it to Srinagar's Lal Chowk in a military aircraft to unfurl the national flag on January 26.

== 2011 Rashtriya Ekta Yatra ==
The 2011 Ekta Yatra was led by Bharatiya Janata Yuva Morcha, BJP youth wing national president and Lok Sabha member of Parliament Anurag Thakur. The rally started in Kolkata, West Bengal on 12 January, travelled through Jharkhand, Bihar, Uttar Pradesh, Maharashtra, Madhya Pradesh, Rajasthan, Punjab, and Haryana. The Ekta Yatra was to end with the unfurling of the flag on 26 January in Lal Chowk, a city square in Srinagar, Jammu and Kashmir. But this did not happen as BJP leaders were arrested and not allowed to enter Kashmir. Sushma Swaraj and Arun Jaitley were held in detention on their arrival at Jammu airport. Central and Jammu and Kashmir state governments stopped this yatra to continue in Jammu and Kashmir.
