= S. K. Saikia =

Indian police chief

S. K. Saikia is a three times former police commissioner of the city of Ahmedabad in western India. Saikia is a 1977 batch IPS officer. He has previously served as a Home Secretary in charge of law and order in Gujarat and is an Additional Director General of Police, the second highest police rank in a state of India. Saikia was appointed as the commissioner of India by the government on recommendation of the Election Commission of India during the 2007 Gujarat legislative election. S.K.Saikia is known to be a very honest and non-corrupt police officer.

Preceded by {{{before}}}	Police commissioner of Ahmedabad; Oct 2007–May 2008; Feb 2009-Sept 2009; Oct 2011-Sept 2013	Succeeded by multiple
