= Visavadar Assembly constituency =

Legislative Assembly constituency in Gujarat State, India

Coordinates: 21.34°N 70.75°E

Visavadar
- Constituency No. 87 for the Gujarat Legislative Assembly

Constituency details
- Country: India
- Region: Western India
- State: Gujarat
- District: Junagadh
- Lok Sabha constituency: Junagadh
- Established: 1972
- Total electors: 259,296
- Reservation: None

Member of Legislative Assembly
- 15th Gujarat Legislative Assembly
- Incumbent Gopal Italia
- Party: AAP
- Elected year: 2025

Visavadar is one of the 182 Legislative Assembly constituencies of Gujarat state in India. It is part of Junagadh district and a segment of Junagadh Lok Sabha constituency.

== List of segments ==
This assembly seat represents the following segments,

1. Visavadar Taluka
2. Bhesan Taluka
3. Junagadh Taluka (Part) Villages – Kerala, Bhiyal, Choki, Kathrota, Isapur, Baliyavad, Chokli, Vadal, Sukhpur, Bamangam, Dervan, Hasnapur, Jambudi, Indreshvar, Surajkund, Girnar Hills, Dungar Thana, Bordevi, Limbdi Dhar, Mandlikpur, Nava Pipaliya, Bandhala, Bhalgam, Mandanpara, Ramnath, Dungarpur, Vijapur, Sodvadar, Intala, Patapur, Salatha, Khadiya, Toraniya, Navagam, Bilkha, Umrala, Avatadiya Mota, Chorvadi, Anandpur, Mevasa Khadiya, Bagdu, Prabhatpur, Rameshvar, Avatadiya Nana, Mevasa Kamribaina, Bela, Badalpur, Bagdu, Jamka, Semrala, Sankhdavadar, Thumbala.
4. Bagasara Taluka (Part) of Amreli District Village – Kadaya

== Members of the Legislative Assembly ==
Year	Member	Party
1962	Madinaben Akbarbhai Nagori	Indian National Congress
1967	Kuraji Bhesaniya	Swatantra Party
1972	Ramjibhai Karkar	Indian National Congress
1975	Kuraji Bhesaniya	Kisan Mazdoor Praja Party
1980	Dhirajlal Fulabhai Ribadiya	Janata Party
1985	Popatlal Ramjibhai Ramani	Indian National Congress
1990	Kuraji Bhesaniya	Janata Dal
1995	Keshubhai Patel	Bharatiya Janata Party
1998	Keshubhai Patel	Bharatiya Janata Party
2002	Kanubhai Bhalala	Bharatiya Janata Party
2007	Kanubhai Bhalala	Bharatiya Janata Party
2012	Keshubhai Patel	Gujarat Parivartan Party
2014^{*}	Harshadkumar Madhavjibhai Ribadiya	Indian National Congress
2017	Harshadkumar Madhavjibhai Ribadiya	Indian National Congress
2022	Bhupendrabhai Bhayani	Aam Aadmi Party
2025^{*}	Gopal Italia	Aam Aadmi Party

- ^{*} By-election.

== Election results ==
=== 2025 by-election ===
Gujarat Legislative Assembly by-election, 2025: Visavadar
Party	Candidate	Votes	%	±%
AAP	Gopal Italia	75,942	51.04	+5.86
BJP	Kirit Patel	58,388	39.24	−1.12
INC	Nitin Ranpariya	5,501	3.70	−7.87
NOTA	None of the Above	1,716	1.15	−0 05
Majority		17,554	11.80	+6.98
Turnout		1,48,786		
AAP hold		Swing		

=== 2022 ===
Gujarat Assembly election, 2022: Visavadar
Party	Candidate	Votes	%	±%
AAP	Bhupendrabhai Bhayani	66,210	45.18	
BJP	Harshad Kumar Ribadiya	59,147	40.36	
INC	Karashanbhai Vadadoriya	16,963	11.57	
BSP	Vaghela Nathabhai	1,842	1.26	
NOTA	None of the above	1,765	1.2	
Majority		7,063	4.82	
Turnout				
Registered electors		256,490		
AAP gain from INC		Swing		

=== 2017 ===
Gujarat Legislative Assembly Election, 2017: Visavadar
Party	Candidate	Votes	%	±%
INC	Harshad Kumar Ribadiya	81,882	54.69	
BJP	Patel Kirit Balubhai	58,781	39.26	
Majority				
Turnout				
INC hold		Swing		

=== 2014 by-election ===
2014 Gujarat Legislative Assembly By election
Party	Candidate	Votes	%	±%
INC	Harshad Kumar Ribadiya	67,128	51.24	
BJP	Bharat Patel	56,868	43.41	+13.97
Majority		10,260	7.83	−20.53
Turnout		131,013	56.38	−9.92
INC gain from GPP		Swing		

=== 2012 ===
Gujarat Assembly Election, 2012
Party	Candidate	Votes	%	±%
GPP	Keshubhai Patel	85,967	57.80	New
BJP	Kanubhai Bhalala	43,781	29.44	
Majority		40,186	28.36	
Turnout				
GPP gain from BJP		Swing		

=== 2007 ===
Gujarat Assembly Election, 2007
Party	Candidate	Votes	%	±%
BJP	Kanu Bhalala	38,179	45.16	
INC	Harshadkumar Ribadiya	33,950	40.16	
BJSH	Goganbhai Pansuriya	5,022	5.94	
Majority				
Turnout				
BJP hold		Swing		

=== 2002 ===
Gujarat Assembly Election, 2002
Party	Candidate	Votes	%	±%
BJP	Kanu Bhalala	45,242	49.40	
INC	Keshubhai Naranbhai Ambaliya	26,423	28.85	
Independent	Beepenchandra Ramani	14,044	15.33	
Majority				
Turnout				
BJP hold		Swing		

=== 1995 ===
Gujarat Assembly Election, 1995
Party	Candidate	Votes	%	±%
BJP	Keshubhai Patel	58,157		
INC	Bhensaniya Kurjibhai Dungarbhai	28,612		
Majority				
Turnout				
BJP hold		Swing		

== See also ==
- List of constituencies of Gujarat Legislative Assembly
- Gujarat Legislative Assembly
