= Gordhan Zadafia =

Indian politician

Minister for Home and Security and Police Housing (Independent Charge) of Gujarat
- In office 1998–2002

Personal details
- Born: 20 June 1954 (age 72) Gariadhar, Bombay State, India (present-day Gujarat)
- Party: Bharatiya Janata Party
- Other political affiliations: Gujarat Parivartan Party (2012-2014); Mahagujarat Janata Party (2007-2012)
- Spouse: Leelaben Zadafia
- Education: B.Sc., M.P.A. (Master of Public Administration), Diploma in Marketing Management

Gordhan Zadafia (born 20 June 1954) is an Indian politician from Gujarat, India. He was a leader in Vishva Hindu Parishad (VHP) for 15 years before joining Bharatiya Janata Party (BJP).

He served as the General Secretary of BJP in Ahmedabad city and was elected twice as a member of the Gujarat Legislative Assembly during 1995–97 and 1998–2002. He was a Minister of State for Home and Security and Police Housing (Independent Charge) during 2001–2002 in the state Government of Gujarat led by Narendra Modi.

He was accused of involvement in the 2002 Gujarat riots. Following a break with Narendra Modi after 2002, he pursued other political parties, competing against BJP, but eventually rejoined BJP in 2014.

== Political career ==
Zadafia was a close associate of the VHP chief Praveen Togadia in Gujarat unit of VHP. He is reported to have been inducted as a Minister in the Modi cabinet as a sop to the latter for his support of Modi's chief ministership. Zadafia is accused of involvement in the 2002 Gujarat riots by posting police officers sympathetic to VHP in strategic positions and accused of helping unleash violence. He transferred police officers such as Rahul Sharma. On his orders, police raided refugee camps claiming that they housed rioters.

After the December 2002 elections, Narendra Modi dropped him from the cabinet to signal a break with the VHP. Zadafia subsequently floated a new political party, Mahagujarat Janata Party (MJP) during the 2007 assembly elections in Gujarat, later merged into the Gujarat Parivartan Party of former chief minister Keshubhai Patel.

During the 2012 assembly elections, Togadia and VHP activists campaigned hard for the Gujarat Parivartan Party against the BJP. Despite all efforts, Zadafia and his team lost the 2012 elections. The VHP support for Zadafia ended up strengthening Narendra Modi's anti-hardline Hindutva image.

The Supreme Court-appointed Special Investigation Team (SIT) questioned Zadafia thrice regarding his role in the 2002 riots. Following reports that SIT had found evidence against him and senior police officers, it was reported that Zadafia was inclined to testify against Modi. Following pressure from RSS leaders, Zadafia refrained from such a move.

On 24 February 2014, Zadafia rejoined the BJP and merged Gujarat Parivartan Party into it.

== See also ==
- Keshubhai Patel
- Haren Pandya

== Bibliography ==
- Bunsha, Dionne (2005). Scarred: Experiment's With Violence In Gujarat. Penguin. ISBN 978-0-14-400076-0.
- Marino, Andy (2014). Narendra Modi: A Political Biography. HarperCollins Publishers India. ISBN 978-93-5136-217-3.
- Jose, Vinod K (1 March 2012). "The Emperor Uncrowned: The rise of Narendra Modi". Caravan. Archived from the original on 3 September 2014.
