= Bhupat Bhayani =

Indian politician

Bhupendra alias Bhupat Bhayani is an Indian politician. He was a Member of the Gujarat Legislative Assembly from the Visavadar Assembly constituency representing the Aam Aadmi Party.

Bhupat Bhayani is a resident of Bhesan in Junagadh district. He is the son of a farmer. He has been the Sarpanch of Bhesan Gram Panchayat. After that, he has held responsibility in many social organizations. He has been an MLA from Aam Aadmi Party. Currently, he is associated with BJP.
