= Special Action Force (India) =

Special Action Force સ્પેશિયલ એક્શન ફોર્સ
- Abbreviation: SAF

Agency overview
- Formed: 2024

Jurisdictional structure
- Operations jurisdiction: India
- Map of Special Action Force's jurisdiction
- Legal jurisdiction: Gujarat
- Governing body: Government Of Gujarat
- General nature: Local civilian police

Operational structure
- Headquarters: Gandhinagar
- Agency executive: Vikas Sahay, IPS, DGP
- Parent agency: Gujarat Police

Website
- https://police.gujarat.gov.in/dgp/default.aspx

The Special Action Force (SAF) is a specialized anti-riot and emergency response force formed under the Gujarat Police. The force was established in February 2024 to control communal riots, maintain public order during civil unrest and respond quickly to emerging law and order situations across the state.

== History and formation ==
The idea of a Special Action Force was officially announced by Minister of State for Home Harsh Sanghvi during the Budget Session of the Gujarat Legislative Assembly on 21 February 2024. The unit was formed in response to growing concerns about communal unrest and based on the model of the Rapid Action Force (RAF) of the Central Reserve Police Force operating at the national level.

The SAF has been formed from the State Reserve Police Force (SRPF) unit of Gujarat Police into two companies, Group-2 Ahmedabad and Group-11 Surat, whose personnel have been given advanced training in riot control and emergency response, which equips them to deal with outbreaks of violence and public unrest quickly and efficiently.

== Objectives ==
The main objectives of the Special Action Force are:

- Maintaining peace and public order during communal riots, protests and violent demonstrations.

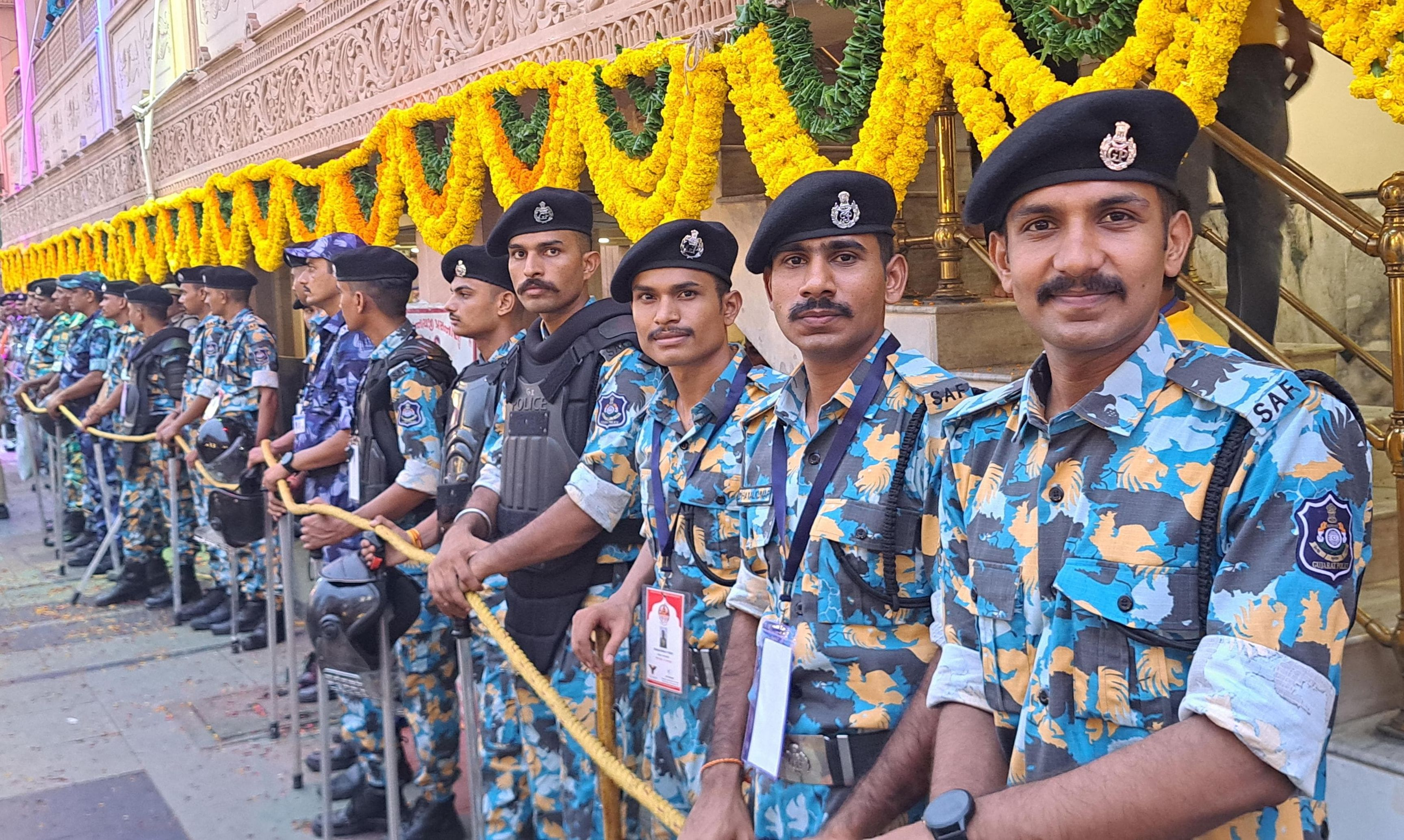
SAF Commandos during Rathyatra 2025

- Assisting with security during politically or communally sensitive events and large public gatherings
- To act as a Quick Response Team to handle sensitive law and order situations anywhere in Gujarat.
- Providing special assistance to local police units in handling emergency situations.
- Enhance the overall riot-control capabilities of Gujarat Police through modern methods and equipment.

== Organizational structure ==
The Special Action Force currently operates as a specialized unit under the State Reserve Police Force (SRPF) of Gujarat. The unit is operational in SRPF Group-2 Ahmedabad and Group-11 Surat, with plans to expand to other regions of Gujarat based on operational requirements.

== Training and equipment ==
Personnel involved in the Special Action Force have been given advanced training in riot control and maintaining public order, including:

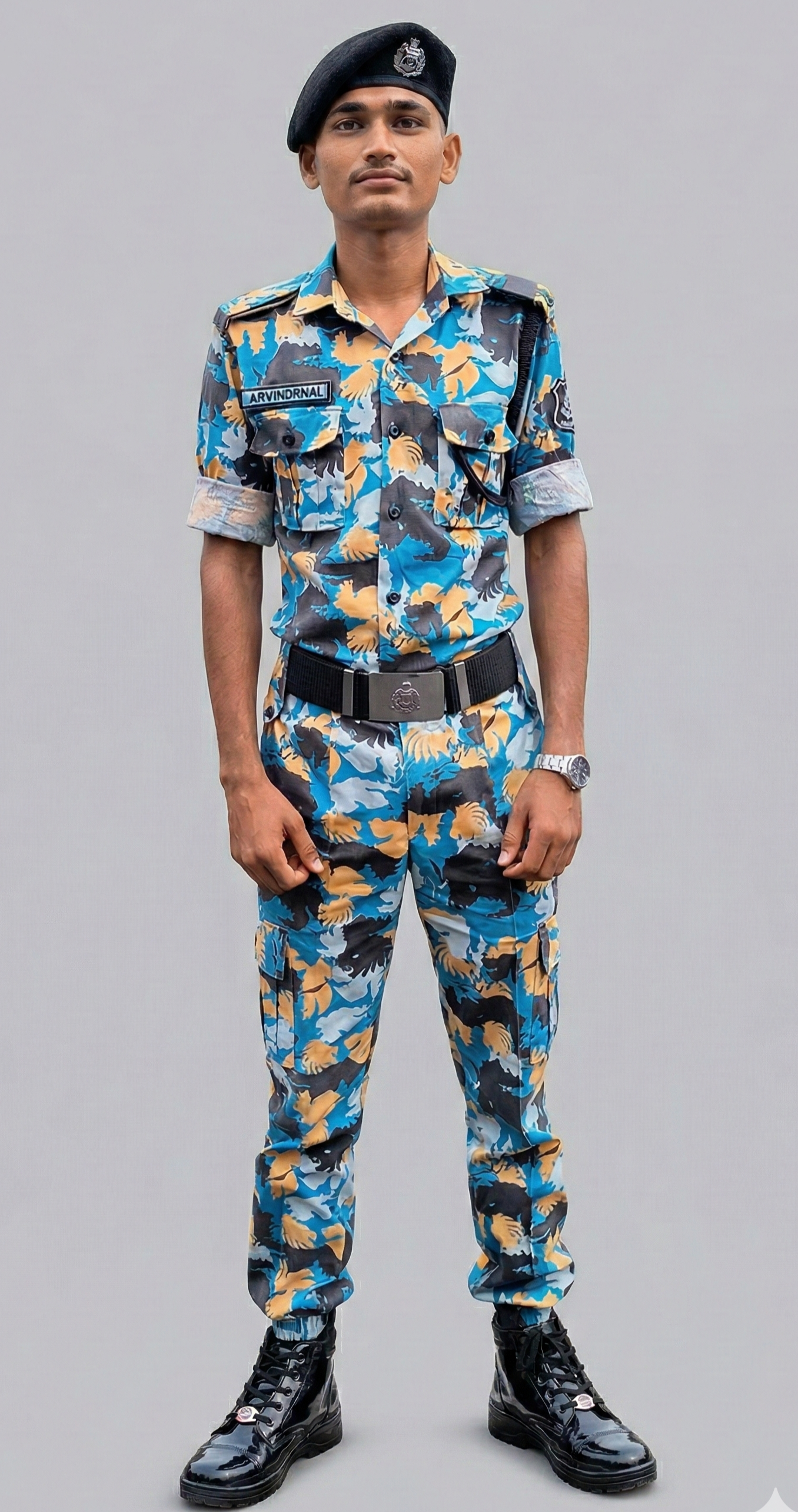
SAF Uniform

- Crowd management and crowd control techniques Use of non-lethal weapons
- Incident-counter-attack and defensive tactics
- Rescue operations in public disorder situations
- Rapid response strategies

The training curriculum is imparted at the RAPO Meerut training centre on the lines of the Rapid Action Force of the Central Reserve Police Force (CRPF), ensuring a professional and effective force in the state police system.

=== Equipment ===
The SAF is equipped with the following equipment:

- Water cannons
- Modern riot-control vehicles
- Tear gas launchers
- Anti-riot protective suits and shields
- Body cameras and live-feed drones
- Non-lethal weapons and equipment
- Communication and surveillance equipment

This unit operates with a dedicated command and control system for real-time deployment and coordination during emergencies.

== Similar forces from different states ==
The Gujarat SAF follows a model similar to the Rapid Action Force (RAF) at the national level and is comparable to specialized state-level forces such as the Karnataka Police's Special Action Force (SAF), which was operationalized in June 2025 to manage communal conflicts in the Dakshina Kannada and Udupi regions.

== Effectiveness and Achievements ==
Operational history Since its establishment in 2024, the SAF has conducted rapid-response operations aimed at maintaining public order during communal tensions and large-scale civic actions:

- Vadodara (September 2025): Deployed to restore and maintain peace following local unrest sparked by a social media post.
- Gandhinagar district (Late 2025): Deployed to manage and de-escalate clashes similarly triggered by online disputes.
- Rajkot (February 2026): Deployed alongside other state security forces to maintain law and order during a major Rajkot Municipal Corporation (RMC) demolition drive targeting over 1,400 illegal structures in the Jangleshwar area along the Aji riverbed.
