= Keshubhai Patel =

10th Chief Minister of Gujarat

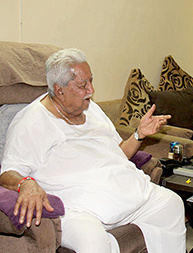

10th Chief Minister of Gujarat
- In office 4 March 1998 – 6 October 2001
- Preceded by: Dilip Parikh
- Succeeded by: Narendra Modi
- In office 14 March 1995 – 21 October 1995
- Preceded by: Chhabildas Mehta
- Succeeded by: Suresh Mehta

3rd Deputy Chief Minister of Gujarat
- In office 4 March 1990 – 25 October 1990
- Chief Minister: Chimanbhai Patel
- Preceded by: Kantilal Ghia
- Succeeded by: Narhari Amin

Member of Parliament, Lok Sabha
- In office 1977–1980
- Preceded by: Ghanshyambhai Oza
- Succeeded by: Ramjibhai Mavani
- Constituency: Rajkot, Gujarat

Member of Parliament, Rajya Sabha
- In office 10 April 2002 – 9 April 2008
- Constituency: Gujarat

Minister of Irrigation Government of Gujarat
- In office 1978–1980
- Chief Minister: Babubhai Patel
- Constituency: Rajkot

Member of Gujarat Legislative Assembly
- In office 2012–2014
- Preceded by: Kanu Bhalala
- Succeeded by: Harshad Ribadiya
- Constituency: Visavadar
- In office 1995–2002
- Preceded by: Kuraji Bhesaniya
- Succeeded by: Kanu Bhalala
- Constituency: Visavadar
- In office 1990–1995
- Preceded by: constituency established
- Succeeded by: Mohanbhai Kundariya
- Constituency: Tankara
- In office 1985–1990
- Preceded by: Popatbhai Lakhabhai Sorathiya
- Succeeded by: Popatbhai Lakhabhai Sorathiya
- Constituency: Gondal
- In office 1980–1985
- Preceded by: Patel Bhimjibhai Vasrambhai
- Succeeded by: Patel Raghavji Hansraj
- Constituency: Kalavad
- In office 1975–1980
- Constituency: Rajkot

Leader of Opposition Gujarat Legislative Assembly
- In office 29 October 1990 – 11 March 1995
- Preceded by: Chhaganbhai Devabhai Patel
- Succeeded by: Amarsinh Chaudhary

Personal details
- Born: 24 July 1928 Visavadar, Junagadh State, British India
- Died: 29 October 2020 (aged 92) Ahmedabad, Gujarat, India
- Party: Bharatiya Jana Sangh (1951–1977); Janata Party (1977–1980); Bharatiya Janata Party (1980–2012, 2014–2020); Gujarat Parivartan Party (2012 – 2014)
- Spouse: Leela Patel (m. ?-2006)
- Children: 6
- Awards: Padma Bhushan (2021; posthumously)

Keshubhai Patel (24 July 1928 – 29 October 2020) was an Indian politician who was the Chief Minister of Gujarat in 1995 and again from 1998 to 2001. He was a six-time member of Gujarat Legislative Assembly. He was a member of RSS since 1940s, of Bharatiya Jana Sangh in 1960s, Janata Party in 1970s, and the Bharatiya Janata Party (BJP) from 1980. He left the BJP in 2012 and formed the Gujarat Parivartan Party. He was elected from Visavadar in the 2012 state assembly election but resigned in 2014 due to ill health and merged his party with BJP.

He was awarded the Padma Bhushan posthumously in 2021.

== Early life ==
Keshubhai Patel was born on 24 July 1928 as Keshubhai Desai in a Leuva Patidar family in Visavadar town in the present day Junagadh district, Gujarat. His family is said to have migrated from Vaso village in Nadiad of Kheda district, a village of Patidars, where revenue clerks were known as 'Desai'. The family migrated to Saurashtra and ran a flour mill in Rajkot. Jana Sangh veterans like former chief minister Shankersinh Vaghela, who knew Keshubhai for 55 years, says he ran this mill in Hathikhana area of Rajkot for a living, and described him as a "self-made" man who built the party from scratch. Patel told The Indian Express in 2015 that "Many Patels from Amreli and Junagadh are Desais––clerks who collected taxes from landowners and were found in the tiny state of Vaso near Nadiad and in Saurashtra. Throughout school, I was Keshubhai Desai, till our Junagadh leader Suryakant Acharya [a former BJP MP] began to refer to me as 'Keshubhai Patel' in public, and the name stuck". In Rajkot, he went to Alfred High School, which is also Mahatma Gandhi's alma mater. He joined the Rashtriya Swayamsevak Sangh (RSS) in 1945 as a pracharak. He was imprisoned during the Emergency.

== Political career ==
Patel began his journey in electoral politics by contesting in the Rajkot municipality and later Rajkot Municipal Corporation. He started his political career as a worker for the Jan Sangh, of which was he was a founder member, in the 1960s. He lost the Gujarat Vidhan Sabha election in 1972 from Wankaner (Vidhan Sabha constituency) to the Congress. In 1975, he won from the Rajkot Vidhan Sabha Constituency and became minister for irrigation from 1978 to 1980 in the BJS-backed government of the Indian National Congress (Organisation), popularly called the Sanstha Congress, led by Chief Minister Babubhai Jashbhai Patel. During the Emergency, Patel was among the 3,500 people from Gujarat to be jailed under the draconian Maintenance of Internal Security Act. He was involved in relief work following the 1979 Machchhu dam failure which devastated Morbi.

Patel won assembly elections for the constituencies of Rajkot (1975), Gondal (1980), Kalavad (1985), Tankara (1990), and Visavadar (Vidhan Sabha constituency) (1995, 1998, 2012) between 1975 and 2012. In 1980, when Jan Sangh was dissolved, he became a senior organiser of the newly formed Bharatiya Janata Party (BJP). Patel was Deputy Chief Minister of Gujarat from 4 March 1990 to 25 October 1990 under Chimanbhai Patel. He organized the 1995 assembly election campaign for the BJP against Congress (I), which the party won. Patel became the chief minister of Gujarat on 14 March 1995 but resigned seven months later as his colleague Shankersinh Vaghela revolted against him. Suresh Mehta succeeded him as a consensus chief minister. BJP was split as the Rashtriya Janata Party (RJP) was formed by Vaghela who became the chief minister in October 1996 with support of the Congress (I). The assembly was dissolved in 1998 when Congress (I) withdrew its support for the RJP. The BJP, led by Patel, returned to power in the 1998 assembly elections and he became the chief minister again on 4 March 1998.

Patel resigned as the chief minister on 2 October 2001 due to poor health. Allegations of abuse of power, corruption and poor administration, as well as a loss of BJP seats in by-elections and mismanagement of relief works in the aftermath of the 2001 Bhuj earthquake, prompted the BJP's national leadership to seek a new candidate for the office of chief minister. He was succeeded by Narendra Modi. Patel did not contest the 2002 Gujarat assembly election but was elected to the Rajya Sabha unopposed in 2002.

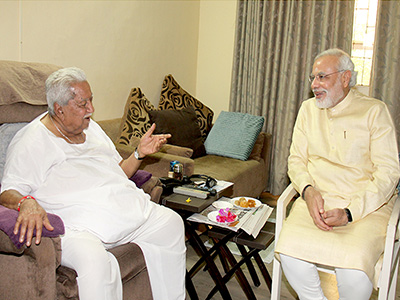
Modi visits Keshubhai Patel and seeks his blessings, September 2013.

In the 2007 Gujarat assembly elections, he urged his community to vote for change. He "blessed" the Indian National Congress (formerly Congress (I)) and did not even cast his vote. The BJP again won the election with a clear majority and formed a government led by Modi. Patel did not renew his BJP membership, resigned from the BJP on 4 August 2012 and launched the Gujarat Parivartan Party (GPP) to contest the 2012 Gujarat legislative assembly election. He won a seat in the Visavadar constituency against the BJP candidate Kanubhai Bhalala, although his party GPP won just one other seat. Patel resigned from the post of president of GPP in January 2014 and later resigned as a member of the Gujarat Legislative Assembly due to ill health on 13 February 2014. Later, GPP merged with BJP on 24 February 2014.

== Personal life ==
Patel married Leela Patel and had five sons and a daughter. His son, Bharat Patel, is a member of BJP. Leela Patel died in their home in Gandhinagar after an electrical fire broke out in the exercise room on 21 September 2006. On 9 September 2017, Patel's 60-year-old son, Pravin Patel, living in the US, died of cardiac arrest .

== Death ==
Keshubhai Patel tested positive for COVID-19 in September 2020 but apparently recovered after the initial infection. However, he complained of difficulty breathing on the morning of 29 October 2020. He was taken to a hospital, where he died the same day due to post-covid complications.

He was awarded India's third highest civilian award the Padma Bhushan posthumously in 2021.

Lok Sabha
Preceded by Ghanshyam Oza	Member of Parliament for Rajkot; 1977 – 1980	Succeeded by Ramaben Patel
Political offices
Preceded by Chhabildas Mehta	Chief Minister of Gujarat; 14 March 1995 – 21 October 1995	Succeeded by Sureshchandra R. Mehta
Preceded by Dilipbhai Ramanbhai Parikh	Chief Minister of Gujarat; 4 March 1998 – 6 October 2001	Succeeded by Narendra Modi
