= Lakhabhai Bharwad =

Indian politician

Lakhabhai Bharwad (born 26 September 1959) is an Indian politician who is a former Member of the Legislative Assembly (MLA) of Gujarat and is the Vice President of the Gujarat Congress. He was elected as the MLA from the Viramgam constituency in 2017, defeating BJP candidate Tejashree Patel by 6,500 votes. Bharwad has raised the issue of farmer suicide in parliament, requesting data on suicides arising from crop failures in September 2018. Owing to his questions, it was revealed that the Gujarat Government had loaned 585 crores (about US $78.5 million) to Tata motors. At present, Bharwad is associated with the Indian National Congress political party. He has no criminal record but has 22,80,000 Rupees of financial liability. He was graduated from B.A.L.D. Arts College in 1983, at Gujarat University. His self profession includes farmer, agriculturist, social worker and animal husbandry.
