= Gujarat Police =

Indian state police department

Gujarat Police ગુજરાત પોલીસ
- Abbreviation: GP
- Motto: सेवा सुरक्षा शांति (Sanskrit); Service Security Peace

Agency overview
- Formed: 1 May 1960
- Annual budget: ₹12,659 crore (US$1.4 billion) (2025–26 est.)

Jurisdictional structure
- Operations jurisdiction: Gujarat, India
- Map of Gujarat Police's jurisdiction
- Area: 196,024 km^{2} (75,685 sq mi)
- Population: 60,383,628 (2011)
- Legal jurisdiction: Gujarat, India
- Governing body: Government of Gujarat
- Constituting instrument: The Gujarat Police Act, 1951
- General nature: Local civilian police

Operational structure
- Headquarters: Gandhinagar
- Minister responsible: Harsh Sanghavi, Minister of Home
- Agency executive: Gyanender Singh Malik, IPS, DGP
- Parent agency: Department of Home (Gujarat)
- Child agencies: Ahmedabad City Police Surat City Police Vadodara City Police Rajkot City Police

Website
- police.gujarat.gov.in/dgp/default.aspx

The Gujarat Police Department is the law enforcement agency for the state of Gujarat in India. The Gujarat Police has its headquarters in Gandhinagar, the state capital, and Ahmedabad.

The Gujarat Police Department came into existence after Gujarat's separation from the Greater Mumbai state on 1 May 1960.

== Organisation ==
The Gujarat Police Department is headed by Director General of Police (DGP.). It has four Commissioners' offices : Ahmedabad, Vadodara, Surat and Rajkot. There are nine ranges in the Gujarat Police: Ahmedabad, Vadodara, Gandhinagar, Surat, Rajkot, Junagadh, Bhavnagar, Dahod Panchmahal and Border Range. For police administration the state is further divided into 33 police districts and Western Railway Police.

Gujarat Police has some branches for special tasks: Crime, Special Action Force, Anti-terrorist squad (ATS) and The Gujarat Intelligence Force wing. The Gujarat Police was the first state police department to crack the serial bomb blast mystery during 2007–08 in many Indian cities including 2008 Ahmedabad bombings. The Gujarat Intelligence Force wing, is considered to be one of the reputed state police intelligence forces.

=== Hierarchy ===
==== Officers ====
- Director general of police (DGP)
- Additional Director general of police (ADGP)
- Inspector general of police (IG)
- Deputy inspector general of police (DIG)
- Superintendent of police (SP)
- Additional Superintendent of Police (Addl.SP)
- Assistant / Deputy Superintendent of Police (ASP/Dy.SP)

- Police Inspector (PI)
- Police Sub Inspector (PSI)
- Assistant Sub Inspector (ASI)
- Head constable (HC)
- Police constable (PC)

Indian Police Service cadre officers rank insignia
Insignia
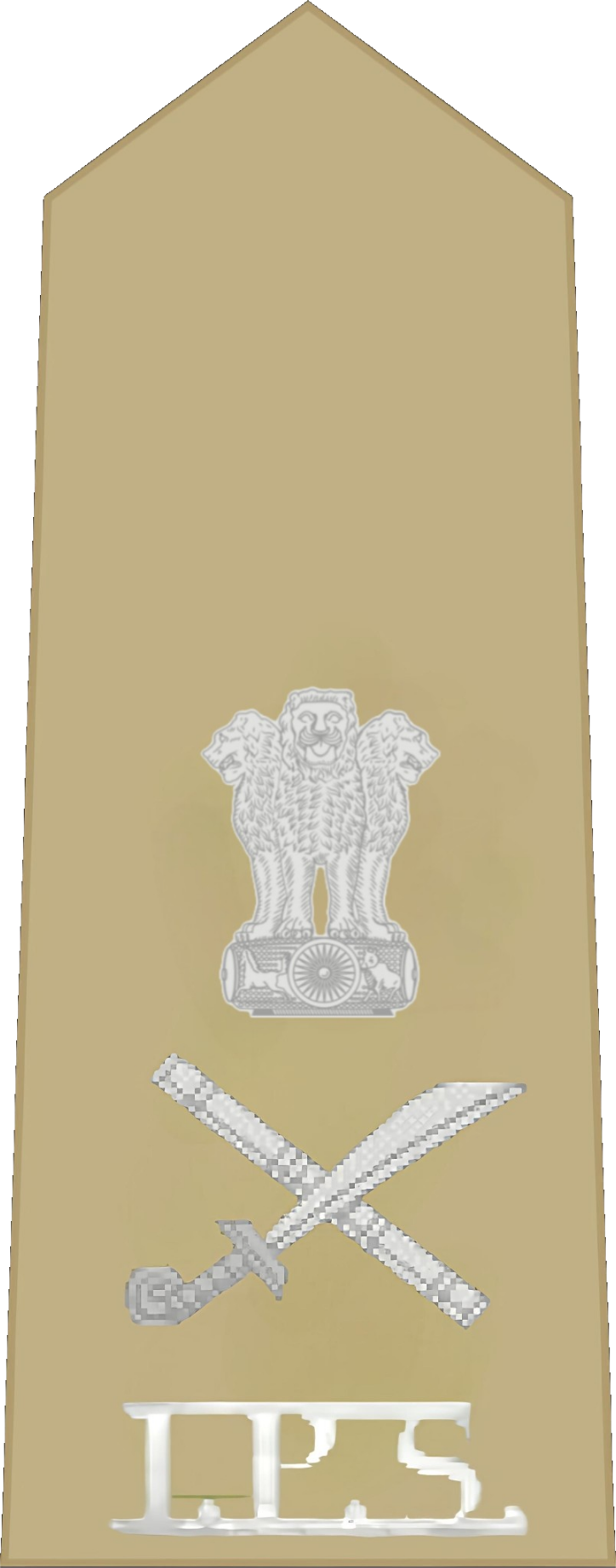
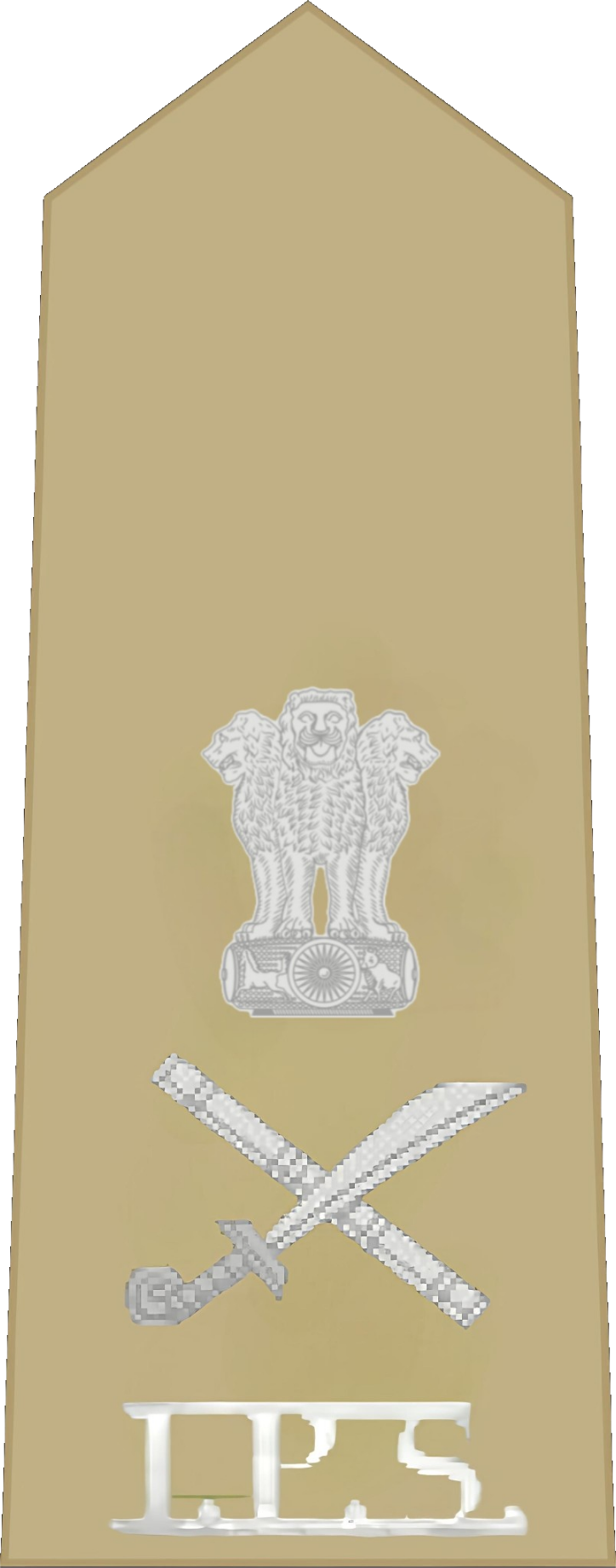
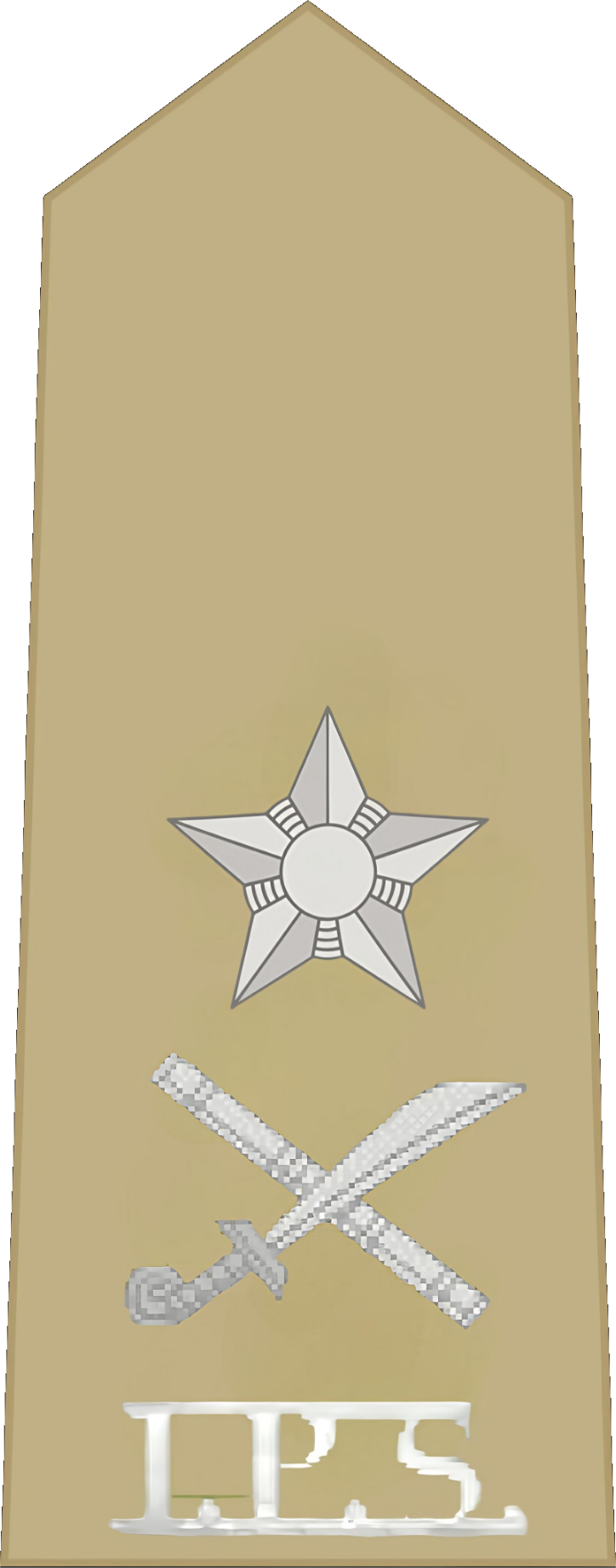
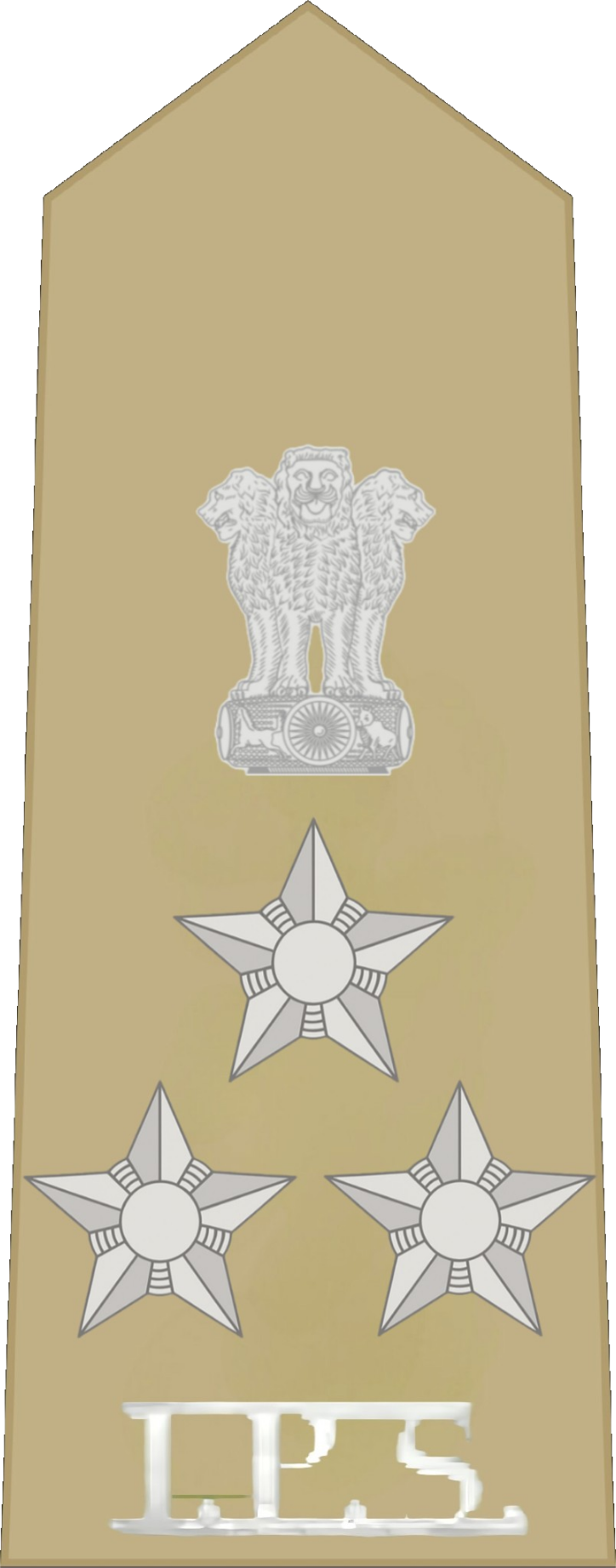
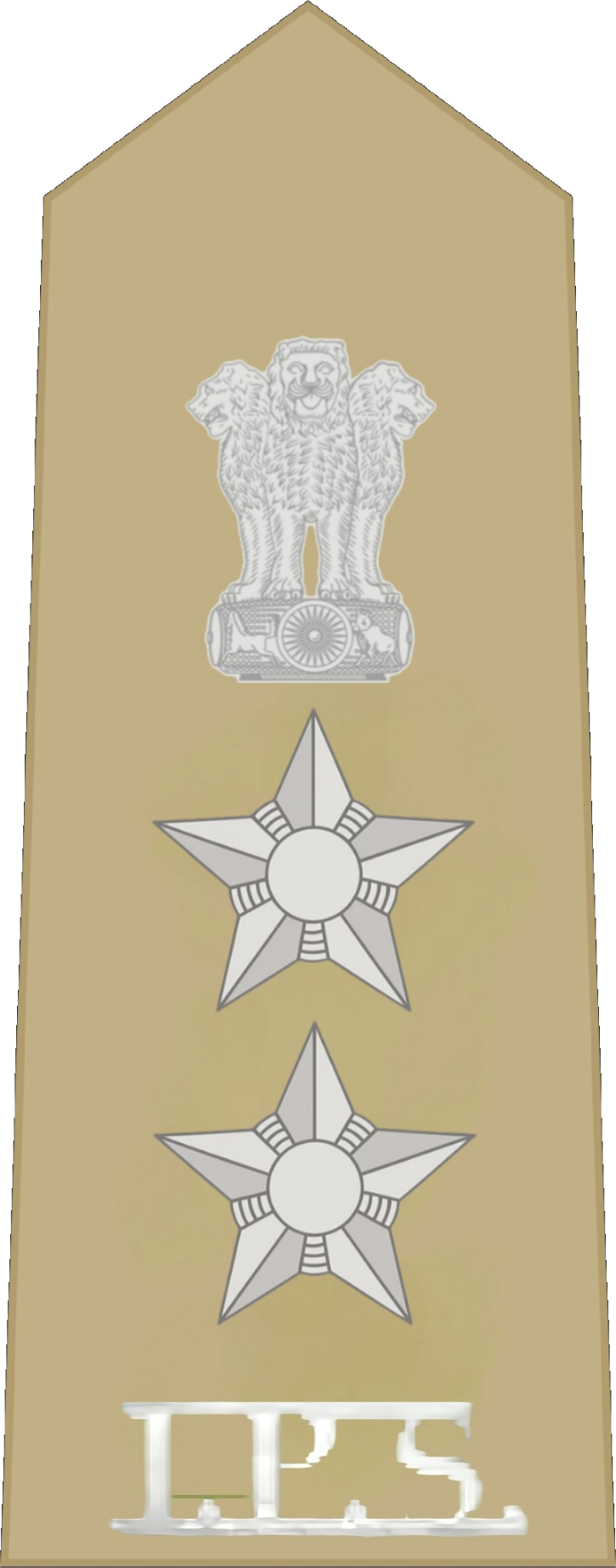
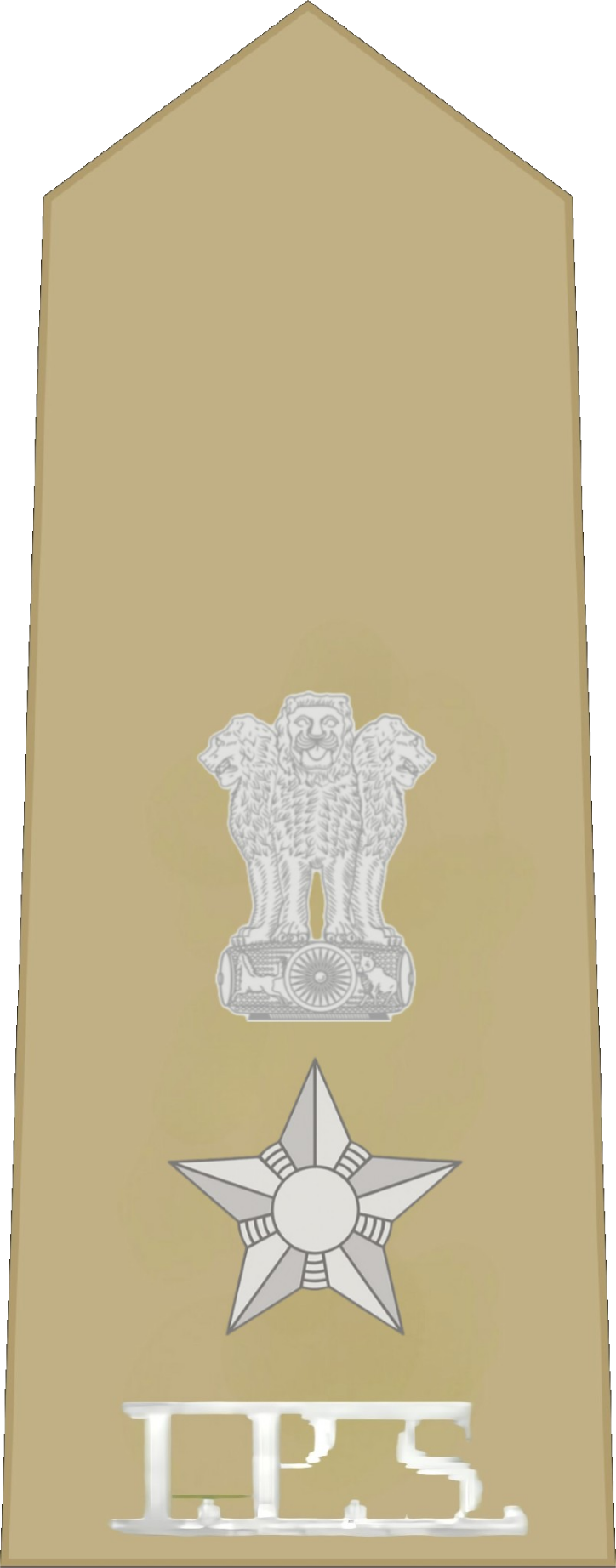
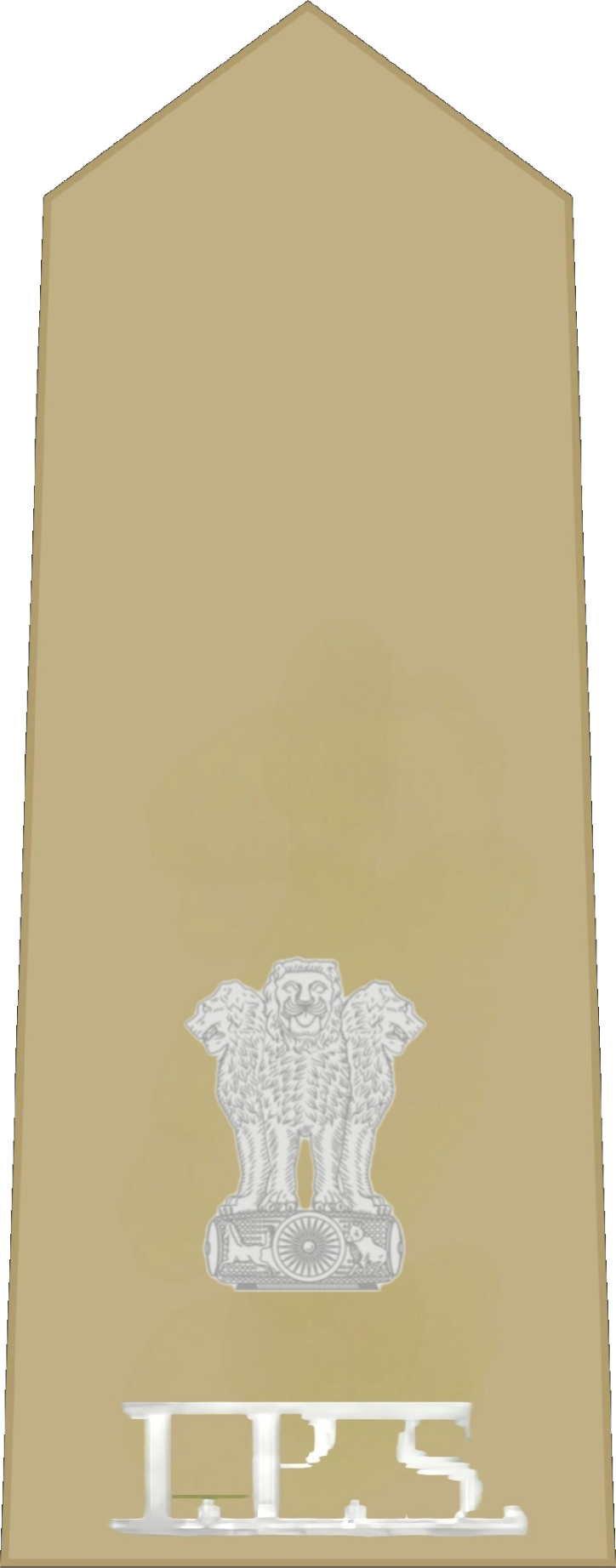
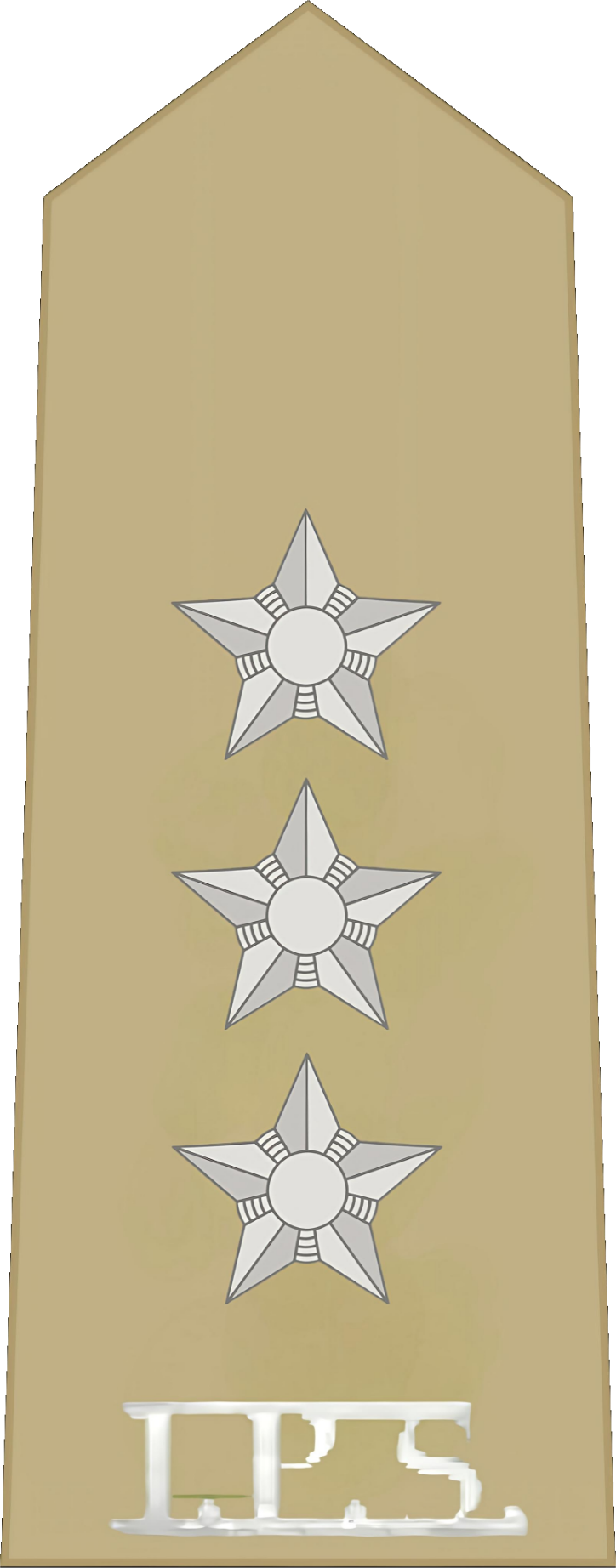
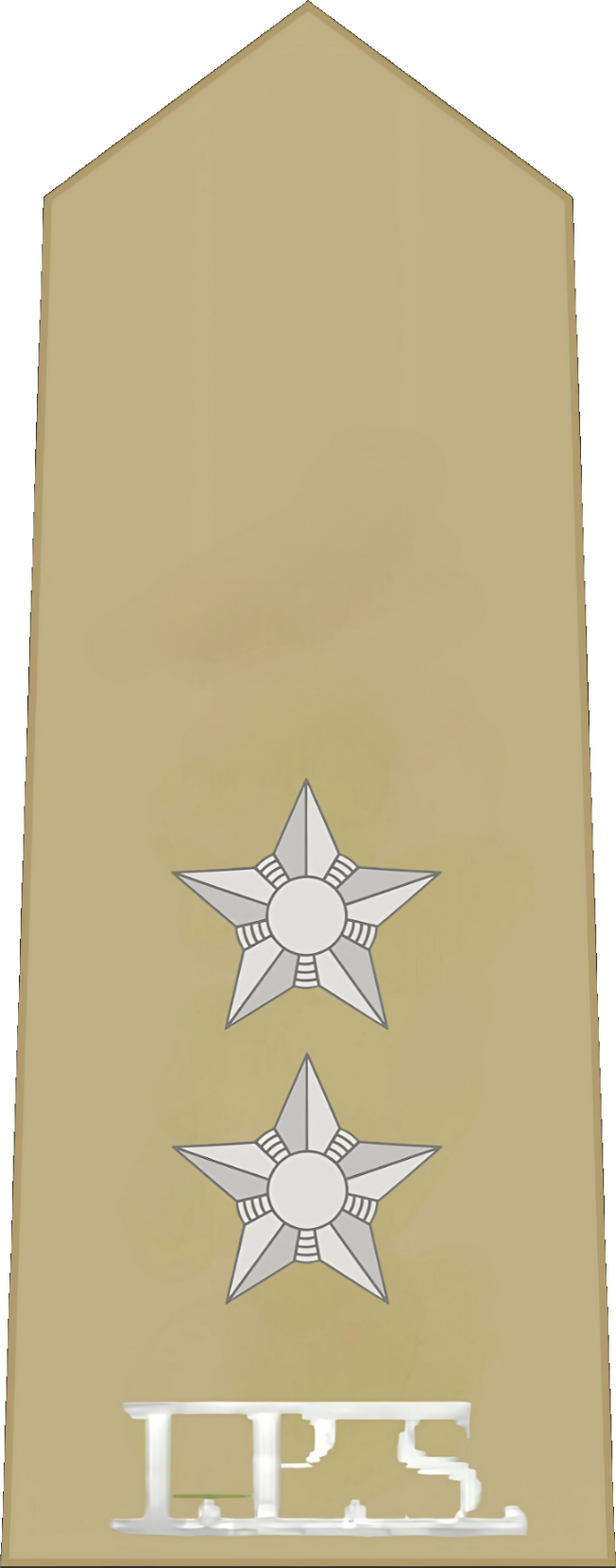
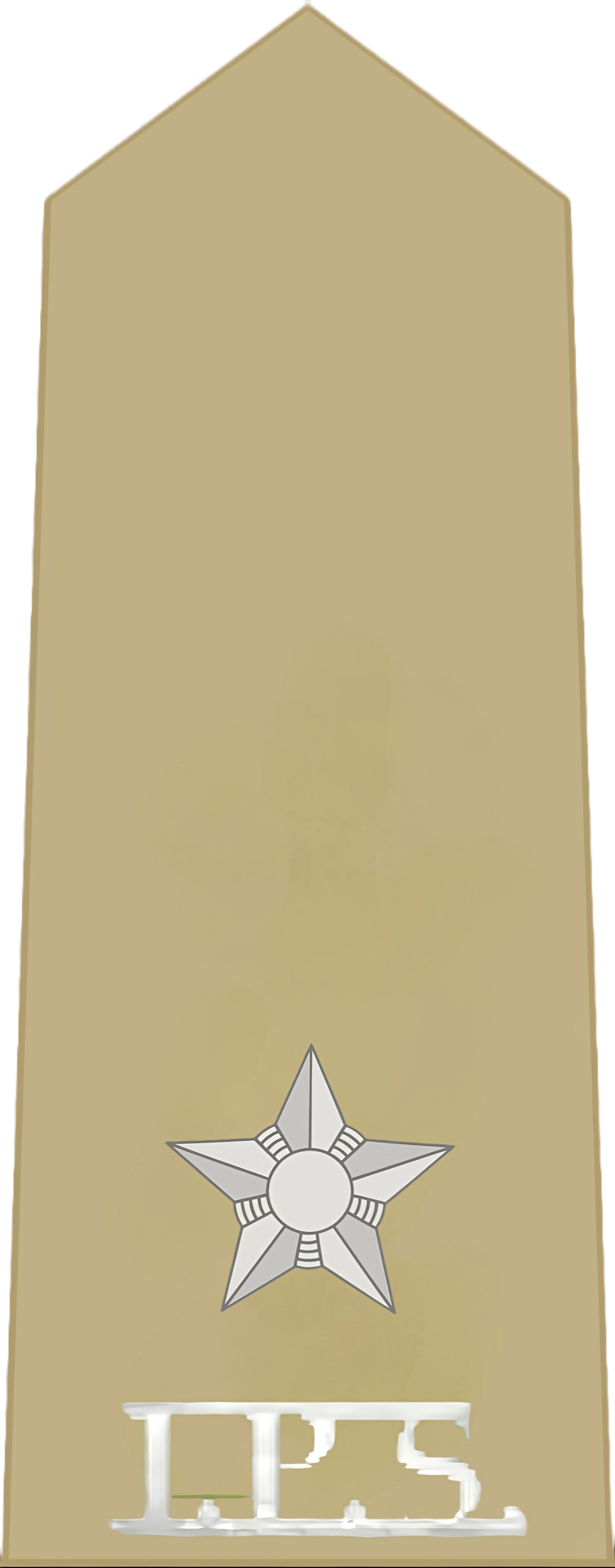
Rank
Director General of Police
Additional Director General of Police (Note: Rank insignia of DGP is similar to Additional DGP.)
Inspector General of Police
Deputy Inspector General of Police
Superintendent of Police (Selection Grade) (Note: The Senior Superintendent of Police (SSP) is a post, not a rank, typically held by an SP (selection grade or junior grade) in states like Uttar Pradesh, Jammu and Kashmir, and Punjab.)
Superintendent of Police
Additional superintendent of police
Assistant Superintendent of Police
Assistant superintendent of police (Probationary for two years)
Assistant Superintendent of Police (Probationary for one year)
Abbreviation
DGP
ADGP
IGP
DIGP
SP (SG)
SP
Addl.SP
ASP
ASP
ASP

- Note 1: The rank insignia of DGP, Spl.DGP, Addl.DGP is the same.
- Note 2: The equivalent rank to the ASP (Asst.SP) in State Police Services is the deputy superintendent of police (DSP/DySP).
- Note 3: The commissioner of police is a post typically held by DIG and above rank officers.

== Leaders ==
On 8 June 2026, Gyanender Singh Malik was named Director General of Police (DGP), replacing K.L.N. Rao.

== List of DGPs of Gujarat ==
Following is the list of All DGPs.

DGP Name	From	to	Remarks
K Chakravarthi	1 April 2001	31 January 2004	DGP during 2002 Gujarat Riots
A K Bhargav	1 February 2004	30 April 2006	
P C Pandey	April 2006	February 2009	
Shabbir Khandwawala	February 2009	December 2010	DGP of Gujarat. Got 1 extension of 3 months.
Chittranjan Singh	December 2010	February 2013	Incharge DGP
Amitabh Pathak	February 2013	24 August 2013	Died during office tenure
Pramod Kumar	August 2013	December 2013	Incharge DGP
P C Thakur	10 December 2013	April 2017	
P P Pandey	April 2016	April 2017	Forced to resign by Supreme Court of India
Geetha Johri	4 April 2017	December 2017	Incharge DGP
Pramod Kumar	December 2017	February 2018	Incharge DGP
Shivanand Jha	1 March 2018	31 July 2020	Got extension of 3 months
Ashish Bhatia	1 August 2020	31 January 2023	Got 2 extension. 2 months and then of 8 months till 31 Jan' 23.
Vikas Sahay	1 February 2023	31 December 2025	Got extension of 6 months
KLN Rao	1 January 2026	7 June 2026	Incharge DGP
Gyanender Singh Malik	8 June 2026	Incumbent	

== Special Unit ==
- The Gujarat Intelligence Force wing
- Anti-terrorist squad (ATS)
- CID crime and railways
- Armed unit
- Special Action Force (SAF)
- Technical services
- Training
- State crime record Bureau
