= Nanubhai Vanani =

Indian politician

Member of Gujarat Legislative Assembly
- In office 2012–2017
- Preceded by: Post established
- Succeeded by: Vinodbhai Amarshibhai Moradiya
- Constituency: Katargam

Minister of State (Independent Charge) for Sports, Youth Cultural activities (Independent Charge), Water Resources (excluding Kalpasar), Education
- In office 2014–2016
- Constituency: Katargam

Personal details
- Born: Nanubhai Vanani; 25/09/1956 Pati, Botad, Gujarat
- Party: Bharatiya Janata Party
- Spouse: Laxmiben Vanani
- Children: VIPULBHAI VANANI
- Occupation: Farmer and Business

Nanubhai Vanani is an Indian politician. He was elected to the Gujarat Legislative Assembly from Katargam in the 2012 Gujarat Legislative Assembly election as a member of the Bharatiya Janata Party. He was sworn as Minister of State (Independent Charge) for Sports, Youth Cultural activities (Independent Charge), Water Resources (excluding Kalpasar), Education in Anandiben Patel cabinet in 2014.
