= Ahmedabad City Police =

Police force of Ahmedabad, Gujarat, India

- Logo of the Ahmedabad City Police

Jurisdictional structure
- Operations jurisdiction: Ahmedabad, Gujarat, India
- Legal jurisdiction: Ahmedabad
- Governing body: Home Department, Government of Gujarat
- General nature: Local civilian police

Operational structure
- Agency executive: Gyanendra Singh Malik IPS, Commissioner of Police (CP)
- Parent agency: Gujarat Police

The Ahmedabad City Police is the primary law enforcement agency and is responsible for law enforcement and public safety in Ahmedabad, the largest city of Indian state of Gujarat.

It is a subdivision and the part of the state police force of Gujarat.

The force is headed by a Commissioner.

It is responsible for the protection and safety of Ahmedabad residents.

== Structure ==
The police operate from 48 regular police stations. In addition, the Mahila Police Station was established to deal specifically with women's offenses and issues. It functions under the Crime Branch and is headed by a police inspector.

14 traffic police stations deal with traffic-related issues.

=== Hierarchy ===
Higher officers:

- Commissioner of Police (CP) (DGP Rank)
- Joint Commissioner of Police (Jt.CP) (Equivalent to IGP Rank)
- Additional Commissioner of Police (Addl.CP) (Equivalent to DIG Rank)
- Deputy Commissioner of Police (DCP) (Equivalent to SP rank)
- Addl. Deputy Commissioner of Police (Addl.DCP) (Equivalent to Addl.SP Rank)
- Assistant Commissioner of Police (ACP) (Equivalent to DySP/Asst.SP Rank)

Subordinate ranks:

- Police Inspector (PI)
- Police Sub-inspector (PSI)
- Assistant Sub Inspector of Police (ASI)
- Head constable (HC)
- Police constable (PC)

== Initiatives ==
=== Domestic help (Gharghati) online registration ===
In the online form for domestic help registration, people employing domestic help are required to supply name, mobile number and temporary as well as permanent addresses of the owner and domestic help. Copies of their documents can be uploaded on the Ahmedabad City Police website.

=== Help Emergency Alert Rescue Terminal ===
Ahmedabad Police

HEART is a pilot project launched by Ahmedabad City Police for women's safety. Under this project whenever a woman is assaulted, dialing a toll free number 1091 HEART would alert the police, parents/relatives/friends and provide the victim's location.

=== Suraksha Setu ===
Setu programme aims to provide a friendly face to Gujarat Police.

=== City urban transport ===
Transport initiatives aim for effective street management towards sustainable mobility of vehicular traffic for which DIG Ashok Kumar Yadav received an award on behalf of city police as best city urban transport initiatives at an award function in Nagpur.

=== Air purifiers ===
Looking at the health of traffic police staff deployed near the Pirana dump site, the Ahmedabad police department plans to install outdoor air purifiers at traffic points to provide staff with fresh air.

=== PUBG ban ===
Ahmedabad police commissioner AK Singh issued a notification immediately banning PlayerUnknown's Battlegrounds [PUBG] and Momo Challenge.

=== Police Pathshala ===
The Ahmedabad Traffic Police host 'Police Pathshala' with an aim to bring change in the lives of children living on footpaths.

== Commissioners ==
List of Police Commissioners
Sr. No.	Name	From	To
1.	NIRANJAN DAS	6-5-1960	3-3-1961
2.	N. RAMA IYER	4-3-1961	28-11-1963
3.	R. RAISINGHANI	29-11-1963	15-4-1964
(1.)	NIRANJAN DAS	16-4-1964	27-10-1964
4.	J.K. SEN	28-10-1964	8-11-1964
5.	E.F. DEBOO	9-11-1964	3-6-1970
6.	N.H. SETHNA	4-6-1970	29-1-1973
7.	E.N. RENISON	30-1-1973	30-4-1977
8.	P.B. MALIA	1-5-1977	1-6-1978
9.	H.C. SINGH	2-6-1978	8-7-1979
10.	P.G. NAWANI	9-7-1979	23-4-1980
11.	M.M. SINGH	24-4-1980	31-8-1982
12.	V.T. SHAH	21-9-1982	29-2-1984
13.	Y.B. JHALA	12-4-1984	31-3-1985
14.	B.K. JHA	31-3-1985	26-10-1986
15.	S.N. SINHA	27-10-1986	2-7-1991
16.	A.K. TANDON	3-7-1991	6-1-1992
17.	M.M. MEHTA	6-1-1992	30-11-1995
18.	P.K. DATTA	30-11-1995	31-1-1996
19.	C.P. SINGH	1-2-1996	21-12-1996
20.	P.G.J. NAMPOOTHIRI	22-12-1996	6-4-1998
21.	HIRALAL	6-4-1998	13-4-1999
22.	P.C. PANDE	13-4-1999	10-5-2002
23.	K.R. KAUSHIK	10-5-2002	14-12-2006
24.	J. MAHAPATRA	14-12-2006	20-10-2007
25.	S.K. SAIKIA	20-10-2007	21-05-2008
26.	O.P. MATHUR	21-05-2008	26-02-2009
(25.)	S.K. SAIKIA	26-02-2009	03-09-2010
–	MOHAN JHA (I/C)	04-09-2010	12-09-2010
27.	AMITABH PATHAK	13-09-2010	31-05-2011
28.	SUDHIR SINHA	01-06-2011	31-10-2011
(25.)	S.K. SAIKIA	31-10-2011	30-09-2013
29.	SHIVANAND JHA	01-10-2013	13-10-2016
30.	A.K. SINGH	13-10-2016	25-10-2019
31.	ASHISH BHATIA	26-10-2019	31-07-2020
32.	SANJAY SRIVASTAVA	01-08-2020	30-04-2023
–	PREM VIR SINGH (additional charge)	30-04-2023	31-07-2023
33.	GYANENDRA SINGH MALIK	31-07-2023	Incumbent

== See also ==
- Ahmedabad
- Gujarat Police
- Special Action Force (SAF)

== Official website ==
- Ahmedabad Police Website - http://www.cpahmedabad.gujarat.gov.in/cpahmedabad/default.aspx
- Twitter - https://twitter.com/AhmedabadPolice
- Facebook - https://facebook.com/AhmedabadPolice
- Website - http://www.ahmedabadcitypolice.org
- Gujarat Police Website - http://www.police.gujarat.gov.in/dgp/default.aspx (in Gujarati)
