= Gujarat Parivartan Party =

- President: Gordhan Zadafia
- Founder: Keshubhai Patel
- Founded: 6 August 2012
- Dissolved: 24 February 2014
- Split from: Bharatiya Janata Party
- Merged into: Bharatiya Janata Party
- Headquarters: Ahmedabad, Gujarat
- Colours: Yellow

Election symbol
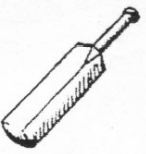

Gujarat Parivartan Party was a political party from Gujarat, India. It was founded by Keshubhai Patel in August 2012. It performed poorly in 2012 assembly elections. It was expanded with the merging of the Mahagujarat Janata Party. Later it was merged back with the Bharatiya Janata Party (BJP) in February 2014.

== Formation ==
GPP was founded by former Chief Minister of Gujarat Keshubhai Patel on 6 August 2012. Gordhan Zadafia led Mahagujarat Janata Party dissolved itself in the Gujarat Parivartan Party.

== 2012 Gujarat legislative assembly elections ==
Gujarat Parivartan Party performed poorly and won two seats in 2012 Gujarat legislative assembly election.

1. Keshubhai Patel - Visavadar constituency
2. Nalin Kotadiya - Dhari constituency

== Merger with BJP ==
GPP MLA Keshubhai Patel resigned following his ill health in early February 2014.

President of GPP Gordhan Zadafia announced merger of GPP with the Bharatiya Janata Party (BJP) on 24 February 2014. Senior leader of GPP and former chief minister Suresh Mehta opposed the decision. Nalin Kotadiya who represented Dhari in the Gujarat Legislative Assembly joined BJP along with party.
