= 2009 Indian general election in Gujarat =

Indian general election in Gujarat, 2009
- April–May 2009

26 seats
- Turnout: 47.90%

	First party	Second party
Party	BJP	INC
Alliance	NDA	UPA
Last election	14 seats, 47.37%	12 seats, 43.86%
Seats won	15	11
Seat change	▲1	▼1
Percentage	46.52%	43.38%
Swing	▼0.75%	▼0.78%
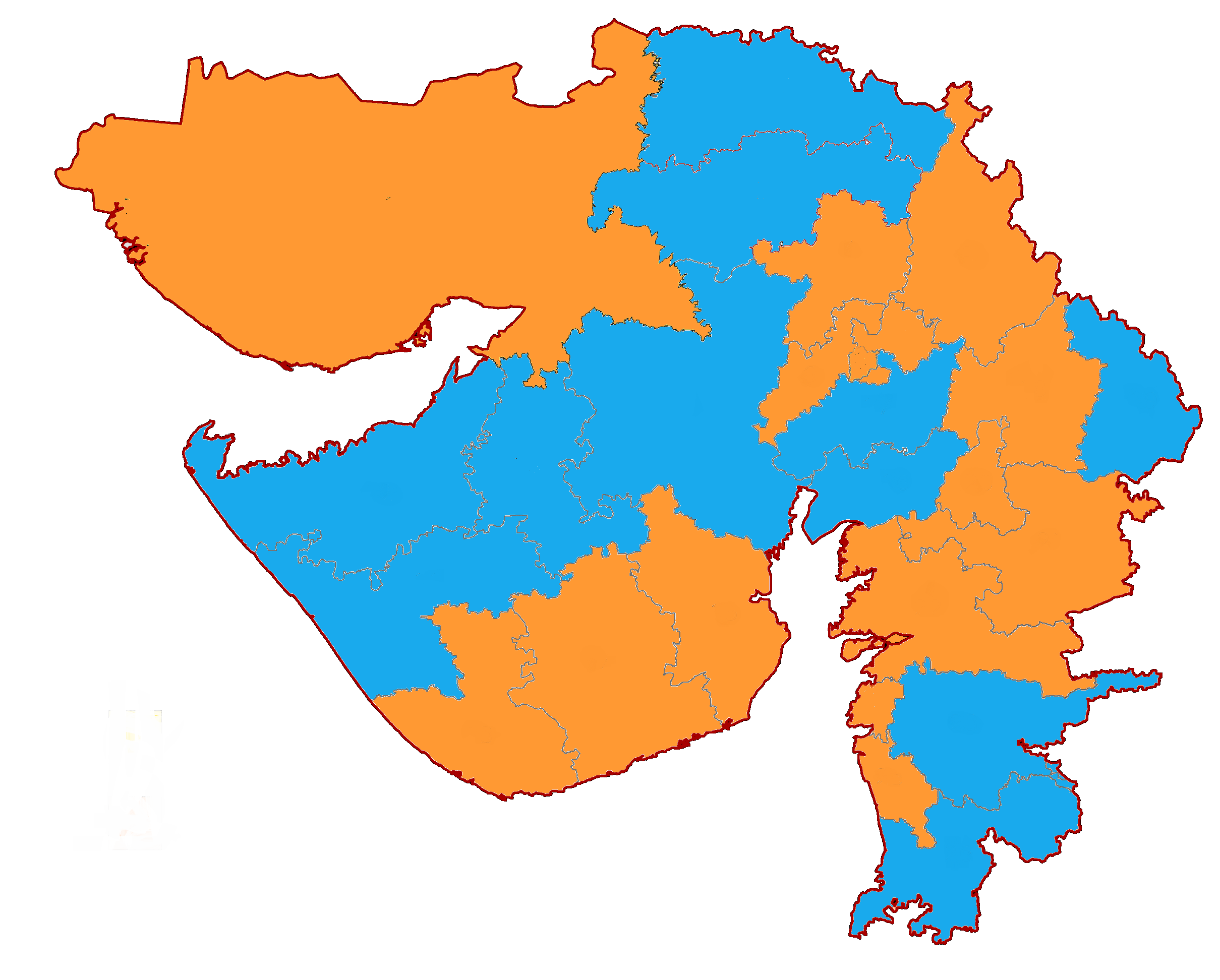
- Gujarat
Prime Minister before election
Manmohan Singh
INC
Prime Minister after election
Manmohan Singh
INC

In the 2009 Indian general election for Gujarat were held for 26 seats in the state. The major two contenders in the state were Bharatiya Janta Party (BJP) and the Indian National Congress (INC).

== Parties and alliances ==
=== National Democratic Alliance ===
Party	Flag	Symbol	Leader	Seats contested
Bharatiya Janata Party			Narendra Modi	26

=== United Progressive Alliance ===
Party	Flag	Symbol	Leader	Seats contested
Indian National Congress			Siddharth Patel	26

== Voting and results ==
Source: Election Commission of India

=== Results by party ===
The Bharatiya Janta Party (BJP) won 15 seats and the Indian National Congress won 11 seats.

Party Name	Popular vote			Seats		
Party Name	Votes	%	±pp	Contested	Won	+/−
BJP	81,28,858	46.52	▼0.85	26	15	▲1
INC	75,79,957	43.38	▼0.48	26	11	▼1
Others	9,31,252	5.33	Steady	131	0	Steady
IND	8,32,856	4.77	▲1.32	176	0	Steady
Total	1,74,72,923	100%	-	359	26	-

=== List of elected MPs ===
Constituency		Winner				Runner Up				Margin	%
#	Name	Candidate	Party	Votes	%	Candidate	Party	Votes	%	Margin	%
1	Kachchh	Poonamben Jat	BJP	2,85,300	50.58	Danicha Punamchandra	INC	2,13,957	37.94	71,343	12.64
2	Banaskantha	Mukesh Gadhvi	INC	2,89,409	44.78	Haribhai Chaudhary	BJP	2,79,108	43.19	10,301	1.59
3	Patan	Jagdish Thakor	INC	2,83,778	44.82	Bhavsinh Rathod	BJP	2,65,274	41.90	18,504	2.92
4	Mahesana	Jayshreeben Patel	BJP	3,34,631	48.31	Jivabhai Patel	INC	3,12,766	45.15	21,865	3.16
5	Sabarkantha	Mahendrasinh Chauhan	BJP	3,37,432	47.02	Madhusudan Mistry	INC	3,20,272	44.63	17,160	2.39
6	Gandhinagar	L. K. Advani	BJP	4,34,044	54.89	Sureshkumar Patel	INC	3,12,297	39.49	1,21,747	15.40
7	Ahmedabad East	Harin Pathak	BJP	3,18,846	53.37	Dipakbhai Ratilal	INC	2,32,790	38.97	86,056	14.40
8	Ahmedabad West	Kirit Solanki	BJP	3,76,823	54.61	Shailesh M. Parmar	INC	2,85,696	41.40	91,127	13.21
9	Surendranagar	Somabhai Patel	INC	2,47,710	42.25	Lalji Mer	BJP	2,42,879	41.42	4,831	0.83
10	Rajkot	Kunwarjibhai Bavaliya	INC	3,07,553	47.34	Kirankumar Bhalodia	BJP	2,82,818	43.54	24,735	3.80
11	Porbandar	Vitthal Radadiya	INC	3,29,436	49.87	Mansukhbhai Khachariya	BJP	2,89,933	43.89	39,503	5.98
12	Jamnagar	Vikrambhai Madam	INC	2,81,410	47.33	Rameshbhai Devrajbhai	BJP	2,54,992	42.89	26,418	4.44
13	Junagadh	Dinu Solanki	BJP	3,55,335	46.75	Jashubhai Barad	INC	3,41,576	44.94	13,759	1.81
14	Amreli	Naranbhai Kachhadia	BJP	2,47,666	47.21	Virjibhai Thummar	INC	2,10,349	40.10	37,317	7.11
15	Bhavnagar	Rajendrasinh Rana	BJP	2,13,376	34.23	Mahavirsinh Gohil	INC	2,07,483	33.29	5,893	0.94
16	Anand	Bharatsinh Solanki	INC	3,48,655	51.57	Dipakbhai Chimanbhai	BJP	2,81,337	41.61	67,318	9.96
17	Kheda	Dinsha Patel	INC	2,84,004	47.12	Devusinh Chauhan	BJP	2,83,158	46.98	846	0.14
18	Panchmahal	Prabhatsinh Chauhan	BJP	2,82,079	46.50	Shankersinh Vaghela	INC	2,79,998	46.15	2,081	0.35
19	Dahod	Prabha Taviad	INC	2,50,586	46.89	Somjibhai Damor	BJP	1,92,050	35.94	58,536	10.95
20	Vadodara	Balkrishna Shukla	BJP	4,28,833	57.40	Satyajitsinh Gaekwad	INC	2,92,805	39.19	1,36,028	18.21
21	Chhota Udaipur	Ramsinh Rathwa	BJP	3,53,534	46.20	Naranbhai Rathwa	INC	3,26,536	42.67	26,998	3.53
22	Bharuch	Mansukhbhai Vasava	BJP	3,11,019	41.50	Umerji Ugharatdar	INC	2,83,787	37.87	27,232	3.63
23	Bardoli	Tushar Chaudhary	INC	3,98,430	47.86	Ritesh Vasava	BJP	3,39,445	40.77	58,985	7.09
24	Surat	Darshana Jardosh	BJP	3,64,947	52.45	Haribhai Gajera	INC	2,90,149	41.70	74,798	10.75
25	Navsari	C. R. Patil	BJP	4,23,413	55.89	Dhansukh Rajput	INC	2,90,770	38.38	1,32,643	17.51
26	Valsad	Kishanbhai Patel	INC	3,57,755	46.20	Chhaganbhai Dhirubhai	BJP	3,50,586	45.27	7,169	0.93

== Post-election Union Council of Ministers from Gujarat ==
#	Name	Constituency	Designation	Department	From	To	Party
1	Dinsha Patel	Kheda	MoS(I/C)	Micro, Small & Medium Enterprises	28 May 2009	19 Jan 2011	INC
1	Dinsha Patel	Kheda	MoS(I/C)	Mines	19 Jan 2011	28 Oct 2012	INC
1	Dinsha Patel	Kheda	Cabinet Minister	Mines	28 Oct 2012	26 May 2014	INC
2	Bharatsinh Solanki	Anand	MoS	Power	28 May 2009	19 Jan 2011	INC
2	Bharatsinh Solanki	Anand	MoS	Railways	19 Jan 2011	28 Oct 2012	INC
2	Bharatsinh Solanki	Anand	MoS(I/C)	Drinking Water and Sanitation	28 Oct 2012	26 May 2014	INC
3	Tushar Chaudhary	Bardoli	MoS	Tribal Affairs	28 May 2009	19 Jan 2011	INC
3	Tushar Chaudhary	Bardoli	MoS	Road Transport and Highways	19 Jan 2011	26 May 2014	INC

== Assembly segments wise lead of parties ==
Party	Assembly segments	Position in Assembly (as of 2007)
Bharatiya Janata Party	105	117
Indian National Congress	76	59
Janata Dal (United)	1	1
Others	–	5
Total	182	
