= Savli =

Town in Gujarat, India

Savli સાવલી
- Town
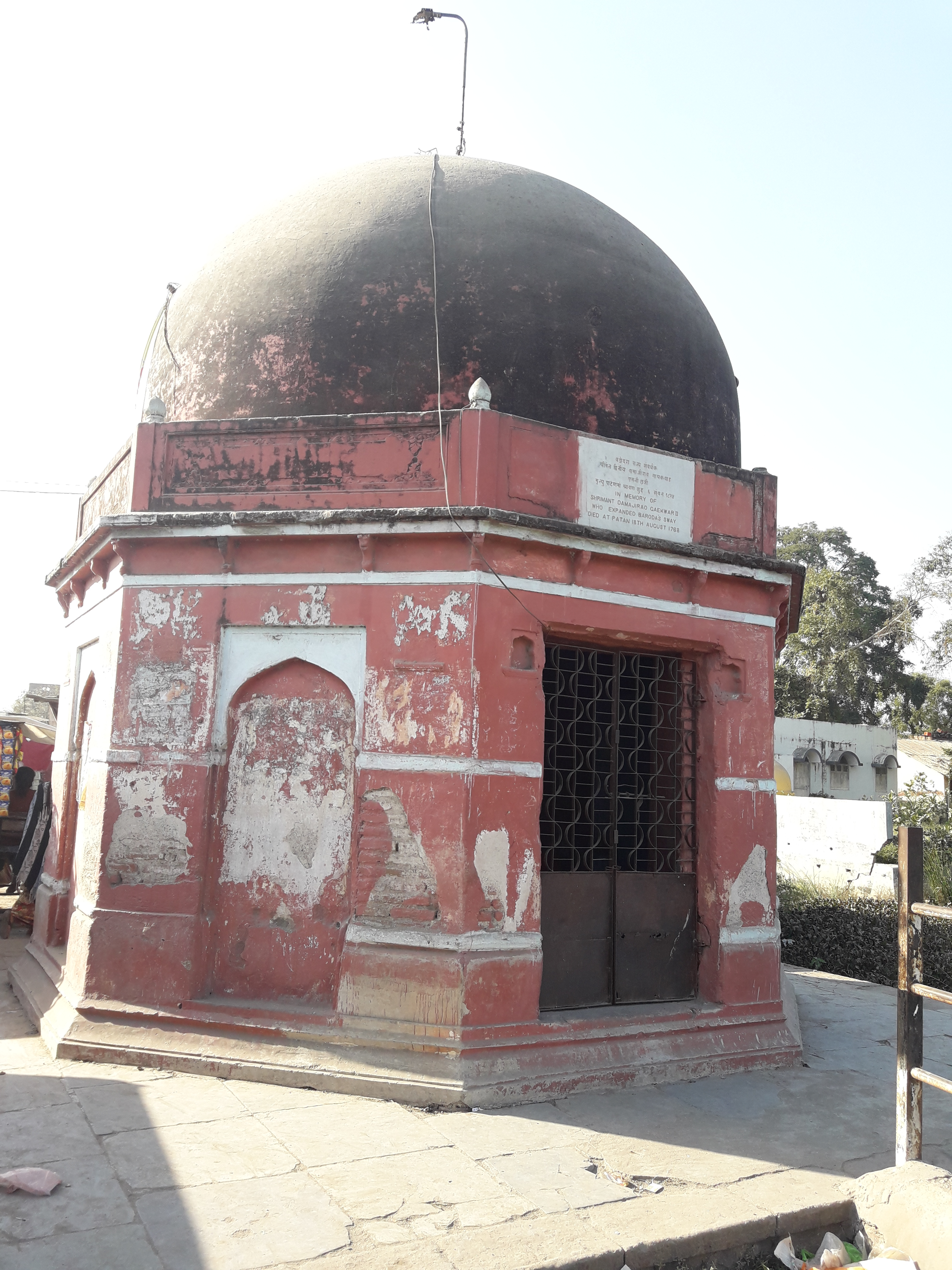
- A historical place of Damaji No Dero at Savli

- Location in Gujarat, India Savli (India)
- Coordinates: 22°33′45″N 73°13′23″E
- Country: India
- State: Gujarat
- District: Vadodara

Government
  - Body: Municipality
- Elevation: 42 m (138 ft)

Population (2011)
  - Total: 27,600

Languages
  - Official: Gujarati, Hindi
- Time zone: UTC+5:30 (IST)
- PIN: 391770
- Telephone code: 91(02667)
- Vehicle registration: GJ-06
- Lok Sabha constituency: Vadodara
- Vidhan Sabha constituency: Savli
- Civic agency: Savli Nagarpalika
- Website: gujaratindia.com

Savli is a town near Vadodara, Gujarat, in Western India. It is located near one of the Gujarat Industrial Development Corporation centres, which includes companies such as Nirma Chemical, Bombardier Transportation (now acquired by Alstom) coach factory, ABB India, Voith Hydro, Thermax, etc. A branch of Santram Mandir is also located in this village near the Mahi River.

== Economy ==
Gujarat Industrial Development Corporation (GIDC) owned industrial estate spread over 800 hectares housing several engineering- and electronics-related multinational companies. The region has gained prominence since it falls on the Savli-Halol route of the Delhi–Mumbai Industrial Corridor Project (DMIC). Also, Savli has also been recognised as a location for Export Promotion Industrial Park (EPIP) which is proposed to be elevated to Special Economic Zone (SEZ).

In 2009, Bombardier Transportation (now acquired by Alstom) opened a Movia car manufacturing and electrical component manufacturing Plant, employing nearly 500 people. The plant houses a 2.5 km of testing metro track. The plant manufactures coaches for Delhi Metro and the New Generation Rollingstock trains for Brisbane, Australia. The plant will also manufacture trainsets for Delhi - Meerut RRTS and for New Zealand, the Tuhono trains.

Energy company Thermax is investing around Rs 1,000 crore in Savli to add substantially to its manufacturing capacity. German players Voith Siemens and R+B Filter GmbH will be investing around Rs 150 crore and 50 crore respectively for hydroelectric.

== Education ==
Savli is an education hub for the town and nearby villages. KJIT Savli, which provides KG to college level education, is the largest educational campus in Savli.

== Connectivity ==
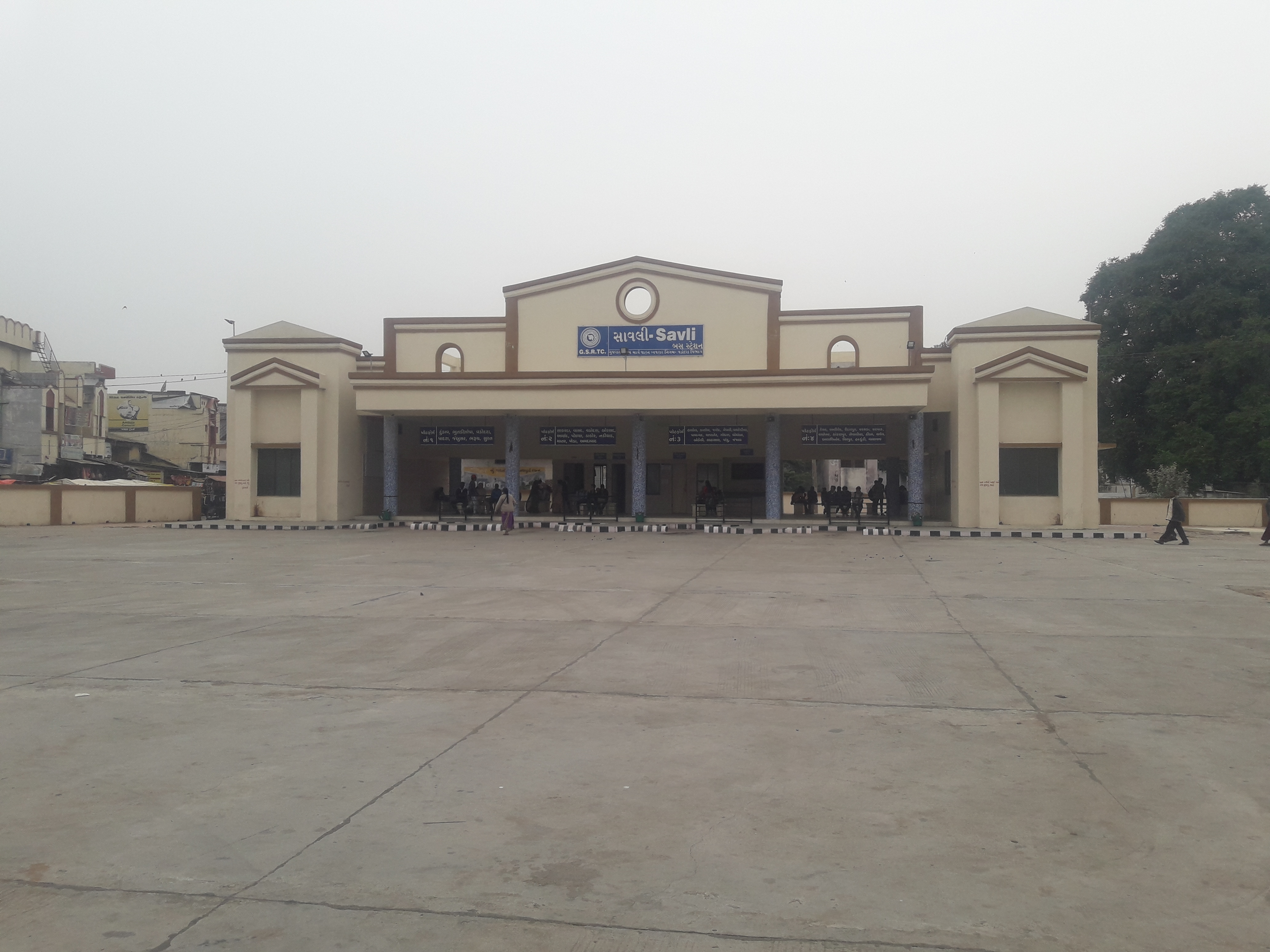
bus station in Savli

Savli is connected to all major towns of Gujarat by public transport service operated by GSRTC, with direct routes to Vadodara, Anand, and Godhra.

== See also ==
- Wankaner (Savli)
