= Lalji =

Lalji is both a given name and a surname. Notable people with the name include:

== Given name ==
- Lalji Kanpariya (born 1943), Indian poet
- Lalji Mer, Indian politician
- Lalji Moreshwar Pendse, Indian politician
- Lalji Singh (1947–2017), Indian scientist
- Lalji Tandon (1935–2020), Indian politician
- Lalji Verma (born 1955), Indian politician

== Surname ==
- Farhan Lalji, Pakistani Canadian sports reporter
