= Nandesari INA =

- town
- Location in Gujarat, India Nandesari INA (India)
- Coordinates: 22°24′59″N 73°05′12″E
- Country: India
- State: Gujarat
- District: Vadodara

Population (2001)
  - Total: 2,815

Languages
  - Official: Gujarati, Hindi
- Time zone: UTC+5:30 (IST)
- Vehicle registration: GJ
- Website: gujaratindia.com

Nandesari INA is a town and an industrial notified area in Vadodara district in the Indian state of Gujarat.

== Demographics ==
As of 2001 India census, Nandesari INA had a population of 2815. Males constitute 54% of the population and females 46%. Nandesari INA has an average literacy rate of 73%, higher than the national average of 59.5%: male literacy is 78%, and female literacy is 67%. In Nandesari INA, 17% of the population is under 6 years of age.
