= Wankaner (Savli) =

Wankaner is a village in Savli taluka of Vadodara district in state of Gujarat, India. It is located 30 km from its district place Vadodara. It is 5 km away from taluka place Savli.

== Nearby cities ==
Wankaner is surrounded by Anand district, Umreth Taluka, Vadodara Taluka. Savli, Umreth, Anand, Vadodara, Dakor are the nearby cities.

== Population ==
Wankaner population
Male	4118
Female	3659
Total Population	7777
