= M. Krishnappa =

M. Krishnappa may refer to:

- M. Krishnappa (politician, born 1918), Indian politician
- M. Krishnappa (politician, born 1953), Indian politician
- M. Krishnappa (politician, born 1962), Indian politician
