= Tejasvi Surya =

Indian politician (born 1990)

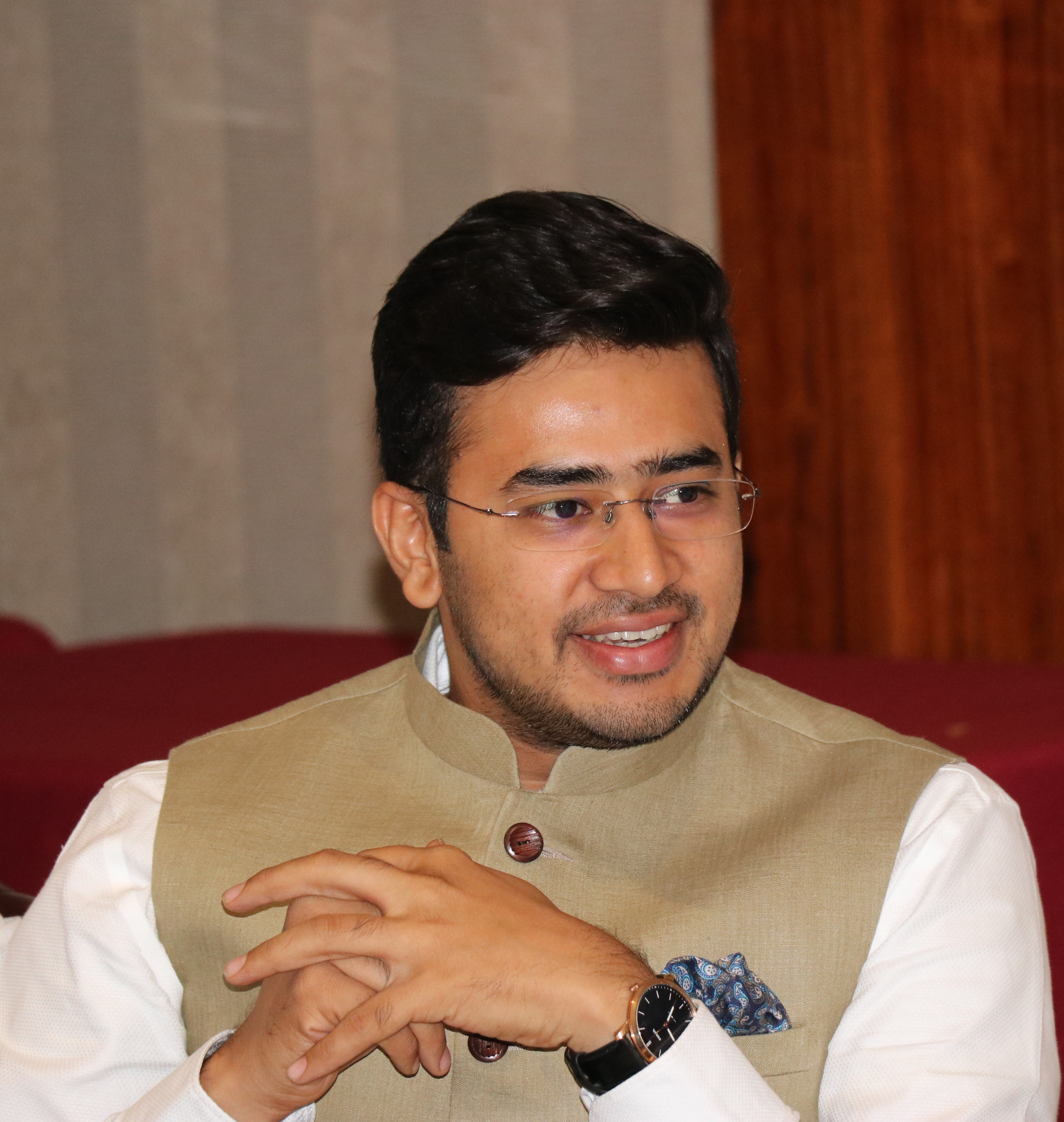
- Surya in 2022

Member of Parliament, Lok Sabha
- Incumbent
- Assumed office 23 May 2019
- Preceded by: Ananth Kumar
- Constituency: Bangalore South, Karnataka

14th President of Bharatiya Janata Yuva Morcha
- In office 26 September 2020 – 31 August 2026
- Preceded by: Poonam Mahajan
- Succeeded by: Hemang Joshi

Personal details
- Born: Lakya Suryanarayana Tejasvi Surya; 16 November 1990 (age 35) Bangalore, Karnataka, India
- Party: Bharatiya Janata Party
- Spouse: Sivasri Skandaprasad (m. 2025)
- Relatives: L. A. Ravi Subramanya (uncle)
- Education: Bangalore Institute of Legal Studies, Karnataka State Law University (LLB)
- Occupation: Politician
- Profession: Lawyer
- Website: tejasvisurya.in

Lakya Suryanarayana Tejasvi Surya (Kannada pronunciation: [t̪eːdʒɐsʋi suːɾja]; born 16 November 1990) is an Indian politician, RSS swayamsevak and lawyer serving as the Member of Parliament in the 17th Lok Sabha from the Bharatiya Janata Party, representing the Bangalore South constituency. He was also the president of the Bharatiya Janata Yuva Morcha from 26 September 2020 until 17 August 2026.

== Early and personal life ==
Lakya Suryanarayana Tejasvi Surya was born on 16 November 1990 in Bangalore, Karnataka. He is the son of the former Joint Commissioner of Excise, L. A. Suryanarayana, and Rama. His uncle is the three-time MLA from Basavanagudi constituency, L. A. Ravi Subramanya.

At the age of 9, Surya sold his paintings and donated the proceedings to the Army's Kargil fund while studying at the St. Paul's High School, Belgaum. In 2001, while studying at the Sri Kumaran Children's Home, Thyagarajanagar, he received the National Balashree Honour for Creative Scientific Innovation. He later graduated from Bangalore Institute of Legal Studies with a Bachelor of Academic Law and an LLB.

Surya is trained in Carnatic music. In 2008, he founded the NGO, Arise India, dedicated to school education initiatives. He has previously written for IndiaFacts.

In 2024, he became the first Indian public representative to complete the Ironman challenge.

He is married to Chennai-based classical singer, dancer and YouTuber Sivasri Skandaprasad, who is known for rendition of various scores including Kannada version of songs of Ponniyin Selvan Part 2. They got married on 6 March 2025.

== Political career ==
=== Early years ===
Surya was an active member of Akhil Bharatiya Vidyarthi Parishad (ABVP) and was even the General Secretary of Bharatiya Janata Yuva Morcha (BJYM). He had actively contributed to the Bharatiya Janata Party campaign for the 2014 Indian general election and in 2017 he helped organise the BJP's 'Mangalore Chalo' rally. He then led the Digital Communications Team of Karnataka BJP during the 2018 Karnataka Legislative Assembly election. As a lawyer, he has represented many BJP leaders like Mahesh Hegde (editor of Post-Card News), Pratap Simha (MP from Mysore) and assisted senior advocate Ashok Haranhalli in defending B.S. Yeddyurappa against corruption cases. He has been mentored by R. Ashoka and V. Somanna. While his uncle, Ravi Subramanya, is a senior leader of the BJP and an MLA representing Basavanagudi, Surya maintains that his politics was never connected and remains unconnected with his uncle's.

=== 17th Lok Sabha ===
==== Parliamentary record ====
The Bangalore South Lok Sabha constituency was represented since 1996 by former minister Ananth Kumar until his death in 2018. Tejasvi Surya was chosen to contest for the 2019 Lok Sabha elections from this constituency over Kumar's wife, Tejaswini Ananth Kumar. While she initially had the support of BJP Karnataka state president B.S. Yeddyurappa, senior BJP and RSS leader B.L. Santosh convinced the party's leadership to choose Surya. He, subsequently, defeated INC candidate B. K. Hariprasad by 331,192 votes, becoming the youngest MP in the BJP at the age of 28 years, 6 months, 7 days.

Surya took the MP's oath in Kannada on 17 June 2019. In June 2019, he requested the central government to reinstate the local language requirement for recruitment in banks. In his maiden speech in Parliament, Surya requested the Home Minister Amit Shah to extend the National Register of Citizens (NRC) to Karnataka, citing the increasing influx of illegal Bangladeshi immigrants in his state.

When a holy site was vandalised in Hampi, Surya raised the issue in Parliament, urging the government to ensure better security for the country's sacred monuments. He sought to know whether the Ministry of Health and Family Welfare would ban electronic nicotine delivery systems (ENDS), including e-cigarettes.

Over the course of the 17th Lok Sabha, Surya submitted 379 questions to Ministers, participated in 36 debates, and became a member of the Standing Parliamentary Committees on Communications and Information Technology, Science and Technology, the Environment and Climate Change and the Joint Committees on Offices of Profit and the Personal Data Protection Bill 2019. His parliamentary work earned him the 'Best Debutant Parliamentarian of the Year' Award from the Lokmat Group in March 2023.

In Parliament, he advocated for regional language inclusion in Rural Bank examinations which led to the introduction of RRB exams in 13 regional languages including Kannada. He also spoke for Bengaluru's classification as a metro city under IT rules for 50% HRA benefits. As a member of the Standing Committee on IT and Joint Committee on the Data Protection Bill, he contributed to drafting the Digital Personal Data Protection Act. His other parliamentary initiatives included addressing drug abuse concerns, promoting ease of doing business for the hospitality industry, supporting the "One Nation, One Election" concept, and advocating for amendments to the Prevention of Cruelty Against Animals Act.

==== Bengaluru's civic issues ====
In October 2019, Surya expressed his concern over the short term of the city's Mayor. He urged the Chief Minister of Karnataka to draft and pass a bespoke legislation for Bangalore, the Nava Bengaluru Act, to replace the Karnataka Municipalities Act, 1975. On the problem of garbage in Bangalore, Surya responded that he could only bring it to the notice of the authorities and suggested to admonish them. He then claimed he lacked any authority to solve the problem. This response received mixed criticism from the public.

Surya also runs the NaMo Vidya Nidhi Scheme independent of the government. In 2023, it was reported that over 1000 benefitted from the scheme that aids underprivileged children's access to quality education.

==== Healthcare and COVID-19 response ====
During the COVID-19 pandemic in India, Surya launched a Bangalore South coronavirus task force, which included free home delivery of essential goods, emergency medical assistance, and mobile COVID-19 testing kiosks. He revamped 4 hospitals through MP Local Area Development Scheme (MPLADS) funds, adding over 350 ICU beds at a time of severe shortage and facilitating the purchase of 2 mobile healthcare units.

During his first term in Parliament, Surya ensured that under PM Modi's Ayushman Bharat Mission, 1.5 lakh free treatments worth approximately ₹431 crore were offered to residents of Bengaluru South constituency — accounting for over half of the total beneficiaries in the city. In the same time, the number of Jan Aushadhi Kendras in Bengaluru were increased from 14 to over 120 — the highest in any Parliamentary constituency in India.

On 7 March 2023, Union Health Minister Dr. Mansukh Mandaviya inaugurated the NaMo Free Dialysis Centre in Bengaluru South that was set up by Surya under MPLADS.

Surya's office also runs the NaMo Arogya Nidhi Scheme independent of the government, through which he has provided over ₹1.2 crore worth free prescription medicines to 1000 underprivileged senior citizens during his term.

==== Infrastructure ====
Surya has facilitated the Namma Metro development, helping secure approvals for its Phases 2A and 2B, spanning 73.92 km at ₹14,788 crore, connecting Central Silk Board to the Bengaluru International Airport. He has also been pushing to expedite the approvals for Phase 3 of Namma Metro. He advocated for the Bengaluru Suburban Rail Project (BSRP), a 148 km rapid transport system costing ₹15,767 crore, and monitored the development of the 280 km Satellite Town Ring Road (STRR) aimed at reducing traffic congestion by 30%.

Surya campaigned for prompt completion of the Yellow Metro Line from RV Road to Bommasandra, and the operationalisation of the Purple Line. He also supported the expansion of Kempegowda International Airport's Terminal 2 at a cost of ₹5,000 crore. He helped BMTC secure approval for 1,500 electric buses to improve public transportation. When the Mantri Serenity Apartment project in Bengaluru was stalled due to funding shortages, Surya helped secure ₹900 crore from PM Modi's SWAMIH scheme, enabling 1,200 middle-class families to receive possession of their homes by 2022.

He contributed significantly to amending the DICGC Act and represented the interests of the distressed Guru Raghavendra Bank depositors during moratorium. These amendments brought cooperative banks under RBI supervision, increased deposit insurance to ₹5 lakh, and ensured timely payout within 90 days. Following its implementation, more than 12,000 Guru Raghavendra Bank depositors received deposit insurance coverage, with disbursements of ₹401 crore as of 2021. In total, Guru Raghavendra Bank received ₹753.61 crore as deposit insurance against 21,983 claims.

He has led delegations to address startup concerns and organised ministerial interactions to encourage Bengaluru's startup ecosystem, currently spanning over 24,000 startups. SBI, subsequently, launched India's first dedicated startup branch in Koramangala, Surya's constituency, offering comprehensive services from startup formation to Initial Public Offerings.

Tejasvi Surya asked the highest number of questions and spent the most MPLADS funds of any of the four Bengaluru MPs in the 17th Lok Sabha, emerging as the best performing MP in an analysis by the Bangalore Political Action Committee (B.PAC).

=== 18th Lok Sabha ===
In March 2024, Surya was announced as the BJP candidate for the Bangalore South constituency in the 2024 general elections. A day before polls, on 25 April, a case was registered against him for "soliciting votes on the ground of religion", after he shared a video on his official Twitter account of the surya tilak on Rama, the deity in Ayodhya's Ram Mandir, with the caption"...For Bharatiyata to survive, vote for BJP!". He was booked under the section 123 (3) of the Representation of the People Act, 1951. The Election Commission of India confirmed that it filed a case on his violation of the Model Code of Conduct.

In June 2024, he returned to Parliament for a second term by a margin of nearly 2.8 lakh votes. His nearest opponent was Soumya Reddy, former Congress MLA for Jayanagar in the Karnataka State Assembly and daughter of eight-time MLA, Ramalinga Reddy.

In his second term in Parliament, Surya has been appointed member of the Public Accounts Committee in addition to the standing Committees on Agriculture, Animal Husbandry, and Food Processing, and on Science and Technology, Environments, Forest and Climate Change.

== Awards and recognition ==
- 2023 – Best Debutant Parliamentarian of the Year, at the fourth edition of the Lokmat Parliamentary Awards, recognising his work as a first-time member of the Lok Sabha.

== Political views ==
Surya has described himself as committed to the ideology of Hindutva. He has cited Swami Vivekananda, Sri Aurobindo, B. R. Ambedkar and Vinayak Damodar Savarkar as influences on his political outlook. He has also criticised socialism, particularly Nehruvian socialism, which he has argued contributed to India's economic difficulties.

In December 2019, speaking at a rally in support of the Citizenship Amendment Act, Surya described those opposing the Act as "uneducated, illiterate, and puncture-wallahs". The remarks drew criticism. Surya later said that his use of the term was metaphorical and that he had not intended to demean any profession.

During the 2019 general election campaign, Surya said, "If you are with Modi, you are with India", adding that those who opposed Modi were "strengthening anti-India forces". He defended the remarks, saying that he was referring to opposition to Modi that, in his view, aligned with the interests of India's adversaries.

Surya has also argued that the Bharatiya Janata Party should openly represent Hindu interests. In a 2018 tweet, he called on the party to "really" become a Hindu party following its defeat in the Jayanagar assembly by-election.

== Controversies ==
In March 2019, the Indian National Congress shared screenshots of tweets by a woman alleging that Surya had abused her. Following the controversy and the announcement of his Lok Sabha candidature, Surya obtained an ex parte temporary injunction restraining 49 media organisations and social media platforms from publishing allegedly defamatory statements about him. The order was subsequently set aside by the Karnataka High Court. In April 2019, the Karnataka State Commission for Women summoned Surya following a complaint by the Mahila Congress concerning the allegations and a tweet in which he had opposed reservations for women. Later that month, the Commission closed the complaint after the woman concerned requested its withdrawal, stating that she and Surya were friends and describing the complaint lodged by Congress leaders as politically motivated.

In May 2021, during the COVID-19 pandemic in India, Surya, accompanied by his uncle and BJP legislator L. A. Ravi Subramanya, raised allegations of irregularities in the Bruhat Bengaluru Mahanagara Palike's (BBMP) hospital-bed allocation system. During a visit to the BBMP COVID-19 war room, Surya read out the names of 17 employees from a list of 204. All 17 were Muslims, prompting criticism from political opponents and commentators, who accused him of giving the issue a communal dimension. Police subsequently arrested seven people in connection with alleged manipulation of the hospital-bed allocation system. According to the police, the accused had allegedly interfered with the central hospital-bed management system and facilitated unauthorised admissions. None of the employees whose names Surya had read out were among those arrested, according to contemporary reporting. Surya subsequently apologised to BBMP war-room staff, stating: "If anyone or any community is hurt emotionally by my visit, I apologise for that."

In January 2023, Surya was involved in an incident aboard an IndiGo flight in which the aircraft's emergency exit door was opened before departure. According to an eyewitness account reported by News18, Surya's elbow inadvertently came into contact with the door, moving it slightly out of position, after which he immediately informed the cabin crew. Surya apologised for the incident. The airline recorded it in accordance with its standard operating procedures and conducted the required engineering checks, resulting in a delay to the flight's departure.

In November 2024, police registered a case against Surya and editors of some Kannada news portals over a social-media post linking a farmer's suicide to a land dispute involving the Waqf Board. The complaint alleged that the post circulated misleading information. The Haveri district Superintendent of Police described the reported connection as false, and Surya subsequently deleted the post.
