= Ketan Inamdar =

Indian politician

Inamdar Ketanbhai Mahendrabhai
- Born: August 1, 1978 (age 47)
- Other name: "SARKAR"
- Education: HSC
- Political party: BJP

Ketan Mahendrabhai Inamdar (born 1 August 1978) is an Indian politician from Gujarat. He is a member of the Gujarat Legislative Assembly representing Bharatiya Janata Party from Savli Assembly constituency in Vadodara district. He won the 2022 Gujarat Legislative Assembly election.

== Early life and education ==
Inamdar is from Savli, Vadodara district, Gujarat. He is the son of Mahendrabhai Jasbhai Inamdar. He studied Class 12 at Savali High School, Savali, and passed the examinations conducted by Gujarat Secondary and Higher Secondary Examination Board in March 1996.

== Career ==
Inamdar began his political journey as member of the Vadodara Jilla Panchayat in 2010 after winning as an independent candidate from Dhantej Jilla panchayat. He later supported the BJP.

He first became an MLA of Savli assembly constituency winning the 2012 Gujarat Legislative Assembly election as an independent candidate after he was rejected nomination by the Bharatiya Janata Party. He was the only independent to be elected in the 2012 election. He polled 62,849 votes and defeated Khumansin Raysinh Chauhan of the Indian National Congress, who secured 42530 votes.

On 24 December 2016, he was one of three BJP MLAs, including Manjalpur MLA Yogesh Patel and Sayajigunj MLA Jitendra Sukhadia, to stand with Maharaja Sayajirao University of Baroda professor Dr. I.I. Pandya after he was denied promotion by the university's syndicate group controlled by Ketanbhai's own party.
