= Keyur Rokadia =

Indian politician

Keyur Narayandas Rokadia (born 1979) is an Indian politician from Gujarat. He is a member of the Gujarat Legislative Assembly from Sayajigunj Assembly constituency in Vadodara district. He won the 2022 Gujarat Legislative Assembly election representing the Bharatiya Janata Party.

== Early life and education ==
Rokadia is from Akoti village, Surat district, Gujarat. He is the son of Narayandas Rokadiya. He completed his master's degree in civil engineering in 2003 at the Faculty of Technology and Engineering, which is affiliated with the Maharaja Sayajirao University, Vadodara. He is a businessman.

== Career ==
Rokadia won from Sayajigunj Assembly constituency representing Bharatiya Janata Party in the 2022 Gujarat Legislative Assembly election. He polled 122,056 votes and defeated his nearest rival, Ami Rawat of the Indian National Congress, by a margin of 84,013 votes.
