= Petro Chemical Complex INA =

- town
- Location in Gujarat, India Petro Chemical Complex INA (India)
- Coordinates: 22.38121°N 73.12456°E
- Country: India
- State: Gujarat
- District: Vadodara

Population (2001)
  - Total: 7,336

Languages
  - Official: Gujarati, Hindi
- Time zone: UTC+5:30 (IST)
- Vehicle registration: GJ
- Website: gujaratindia.com

Petro Chemical Complex INA is a town and an industrial notified area in Vadodara district in the Indian state of Gujarat.

== Demographics ==
As of 2001 India census, Petro Chemical Complex INA had a population of 7336. Males constitute 53% of the population and females 47%. Petro Chemical Complex INA has an average literacy rate of 80%, higher than the national average of 59.5%: male literacy is 83%, and female literacy is 76%. In Petro Chemical Complex INA, 14% of the population is under 6 years of age.
