= Fatehsinghrao Gaekwad =

Maharaja of Baroda from 1951 to 1971

Fatehsinghrao Gaekwad II
- Maharaja of Baroda
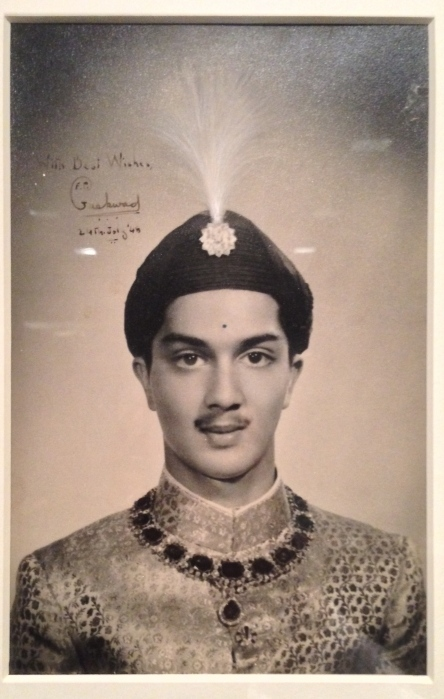
- Maharaja Fatehsingh Rao Gaekwad

Baroda State
- Tenure: 14 April 1951–26 December 1971
- Coronation: 12 April 1951
- Predecessor: Pratap Singh Rao Gaekwad
- Successor: Title abolished Ranjitsinhrao Gaekwad (Titular)

Member of Parliament, Lok Sabha
- In office 1957–1962
- Preceded by: Indubhai Amin
- Succeeded by: Pashabhai Patel
- In office 1971–1980
- Preceded by: Pashabhai Patel
- Succeeded by: Ranjitsinh Gaekwad
- Constituency: Baroda

Personal details
- Born: 2 April 1930
- Died: 1 September 1988 (aged 58) Bombay, India
- Party: Indian National Congress
- Parent: Pratap Singh Rao Gaekwad (father)

Fatehsinghrao Gaekwad
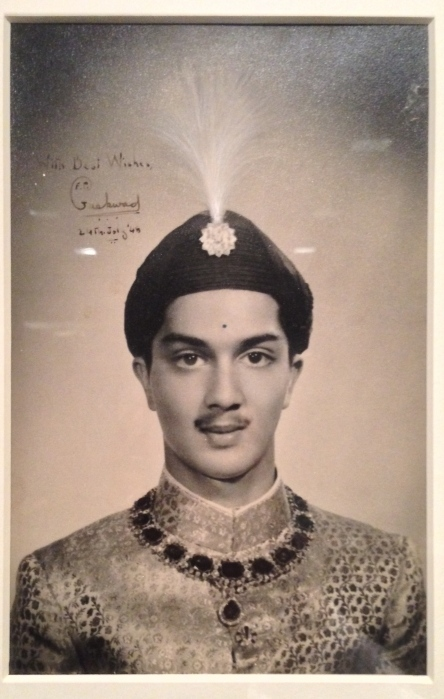

Cricket information
- Batting: Right-handed

Career statistics
Competition	First-class
Matches	28
Runs scored	831
Batting average	21.30
100s/50s	0/5
Top score	99
Balls bowled	120
Wickets	1
Bowling average	58.00
5 wickets in innings	0
10 wickets in match	0
Best bowling	1/8
Catches/stumpings	8/–
- Source: ESPNcricinfo, 13 April 2023

Fatehsinghrao Prataprao Gaekwad II (2 April 1930 – 1 September 1988) was an Indian politician, cricketer, and titular Maharaja of Baroda from 1951 until 1988. In the 26th amendment to the Constitution of India promulgated in 1971, the Government of India abolished all official symbols of princely India, including titles, privileges, and remuneration (privy purses).

== Early life ==
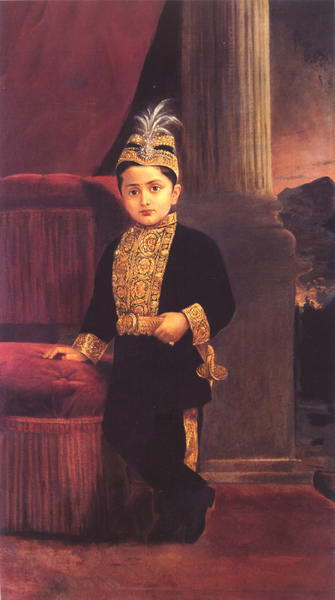
Fatehsinghrao Gaekwad II as a child, by Raja Ravi Verma

Fatehsinghrao Prataprao Gaekwad II was born in Baroda, on 2 April 1930, to Pratap Singh Rao Gaekwad and Maharani Shantadevi Sahib Gaekwad. His father was the last Maharaja of the Baroda State before being deposed by India in 1951. Gaekwad succeeded his father as the titular maharaja.

== Politics and appointments ==
Gaekwad represented the Vadodara constituency in the Lok Sabha from 1957 to 1967, and 1971 to 1980. He was elected to the Gujarat Legislative Assembly in 1967, representing the Sayajigani constituency.

Gaekwad was the second chancellor of Maharaja Sayajirao University of Baroda from 1951 to 1988.

== Conservation ==
Gaekwad became a conservationist after a hunting and photographing safari across Kenya, Uganda, Tanzania, and Zaire in 1955. He viewed killing for pleasure as futile and absurd.

Gaekwad was a member of the Indian Society of Naturalists. He worked to save the Nilgiri tahr from extinction and helped to implement Project Tiger. He donated a pair of tiger cubs to the London Zoo. He was a founding member of the Wildlife Institute of India. In government, he helped pass the Wild Life (Protection) Act, 1972 and the Forest Conservation Act, 1980. He led the World Wide Fund for Nature in India.

== Cricket ==
Gaekwad was a cricket player that served as an attacking right-handed batsman. He represented Baroda in the Ranji Trophy from 1946 to 1958. His highest score was 99 in his first season. He was made an honorary lifetime member of the Marylebone Cricket Club.

Gaekwad served as vice president of the Board of Control for Cricket in India (BCCI) from 1959 to 1960 and 1962 to 1963, and then as president from 1963 to 1966. He is still the youngest person to serve as president of the BCCI. He started managing the Baroda Cricket Association in 1960.

== Personal life ==
Gaekwad mainly resided at the Lakshmi Vilas Palace, Vadodara. He married Padmavatidevi of Jodhpur in 1950; she died in 1984. He died at the Breach Candy Hospital in Bombay on 1 September 1988. His brother Ranjitsinh Pratapsinh Gaekwad succeeded him as titular maharaja.

== Works cited ==
=== Journals ===
- Oza, Gunavant; Polunin, Nicholas (1988). "Fond Tribute to An Ardent Conservationist: H.H. Fatehsinghrao P. Gaekwad, 1930-88". Environmental Conservation. 15 (3). Cambridge University Press: 271–272. doi:10.32350/44518213. JSTOR 44518213.

=== Web ===
- "Maharaja Fatehsinhrao Gaekwad". Maharaja Sayajirao University of Baroda. Archived from the original on 14 November 2026.

Fatehsinghrao Gaekwad Titular Maharaja of Baroda
Titles in pretence
Preceded by Pratap Singh Rao Gaekwad	— TITULAR — Maharaja of Baroda; 1951–1988; Reason for succession failure: Titles, privileges, and remuneration abolished in 1971	Succeeded by Ranjitsinh Pratapsinh Gaekwad
