= Vaghodia INA =

- town
- Location in Gujarat, India Vaghodia INA (India)
- Coordinates: 22.3000°N 73.3833°E
- Country: India
- State: Gujarat
- District: Vadodara

Population (2001)
  - Total: 961

Languages
  - Official: Gujarati, Hindi
- Time zone: UTC+5:30 (IST)
- Vehicle registration: GJ
- Website: gujaratindia.com

Vaghodia INA is a town and an industrial notified area in Vadodara district in the Indian state of Gujarat.

== Demographics ==
As of 2001 India census, Vaghodia INA had a population of 961. Males constitute 67% of the population and females 33%. Vaghodia INA has an average literacy rate of 68%, higher than the national average of 59.5%: male literacy is 80%, and female literacy is 44%. In Vaghodia INA, 10% of the population is under 6 years of age.
