= Indubhai Amin =

Indian politician (born 1915)

Member of Parliament, Lok Sabha
- In office 1952–1955
- Succeeded by: Fatehsinghrao Gaekwad
- Constituency: Baroda West

Personal details
- Born: 19 August 1915
- Party: Independent
- Spouse: Ansuya

Indubhai Bhailal Amin (born 19 August 1915, date of death unknown) was an Indian politician. He was elected to the Lok Sabha, the lower house of the Parliament of India, as a member of the Independent. Amin is deceased.
