= Balkrishna Khanderao Shukla =

Member of Parliament

Member of Parliament, Lok Sabha
- Preceded by: Jayaben Thakkar
- Succeeded by: Narendra Modi (vacated); Ranjanben Bhatt
- Constituency: Vadodara, Gujarat

Member of the Gujarat Legislative Assembly
- Incumbent
- Assumed office 8 December 2022
- Preceded by: Rajendra Trivedi
- Constituency: Raopura

Personal details
- Born: 11 September 1963 (age 63). Vadodara, (Gujarat).
- Citizenship: India
- Party: Bharatiya Janata Party.
- Spouse: Mrs. Rohini
- Children: 1 daughter.
- Parent(s): Mr. Khanderao (Father), Mrs. Yamuna (Mother)
- Education: University of Baroda.
- Profession: Consultant & Politician.
- Committees: Member, Committee on Commerce, Committee on Science and Technology & Committee on Environment and Forests

Balkrishna Khanderao Shukla (11 December 1963) is an Indian Politician from Gujarat. He is a member of the Gujarat Legislative Assembly from Raopura Assembly constituency in Vadodara. He was a Member of Parliament of the 15th Lok Sabha of India from 2009 to 2014. He was elected from the Vadodara Lok Sabha constituency of Gujarat representing the Bharatiya Janata Party.

== Early life and education ==
Shukla was born in Vadodara, Gujarat. He is the son of Khanderao Shukla and Yamuna. He holds a Bachelor of Science degree and also did an MBA in human resource management in 2010 at Manav Sandadhan, the Maharaja Sayajirao University, Vadodara. He married Rohini.

== Political career ==
Shukla also served as the mayor of Vadodara. He later contested the Lok Sabha elections and became a member of the 15th Lok Sabha from Vadodara constituency. He is also member in several committees. He won from Raopura Assembly constituency representing the BJP in the 2022 Gujarat Legislative Assembly election. He polled 119,301 votes and defeated his nearest rival, Sanjaybhai Patel of the Indian National Congress, by a margin of 81,035 votes.

== Posts Held ==
#	From	To	Position
01	2008	2010	Mayor of Vadodara
02	2009	2014	Member, 15th Lok Sabha
03	2009	2014	Member, Committee on Commerce
04	2010	2014	Member, Committee on Science and Technology
05	2009	2014	Member, Committee on Environment and Forests
06	2022	Incumbent	Member, 15th Gujarat Assembly

== See also ==
- 15th Lok Sabha
- Politics of India
- Parliament of India
- Government of India
- Vadodara (Lok Sabha constituency)
- Bharatiya Janata Party
