= Savli Assembly constituency =

Legislative Assembly constituency in Gujarat State, India

Coordinates: 22.56°N 73.22°E

Savli
- Constituency No. 135 for the Gujarat Legislative Assembly

Constituency details
- Country: India
- Region: Western India
- State: Gujarat
- District: Vadodara
- Lok Sabha constituency: Vadodara
- Established: 1972
- Total electors: 230,722
- Reservation: None

Member of Legislative Assembly
- 15th Gujarat Legislative Assembly
- Incumbent Ketan Inamdar
- Party: Bharatiya Janata Party
- Elected year: 2022

Savli is one of the 182 Legislative Assembly constituencies of Gujarat state in India. It is part of Vadodara district.

== List of segments ==
This assembly seat represents the following segments,

1. Savli Town
2. Vadodara Taluka Villages – Dodka, Rayaka, Sankarda, Vasna-Kotariya, Fajalpur (Sankarda)
3. Savli Taluka Villages - Gutardi, Nhara, Gulabpura (Shihora), Ajabpura, Amarapura, Kalupura, Parthampura (Shihora), Gokalpura Ganeshpura, Zumkha, Dipapura, Ankaliya, Dhantej, Narpura, Mevli, Vitoj, Samantpura, Gangadiyapura, Dungripura (Shihora), Rasawadi, Lachhanpura, Rupankui, Kanoda, Rasulpur, Dungrapura, Tulsipura, Kamalpura, Vasanpura, Muval, Sardarpura, Poicha (Kanoda), Mevaliapura, Wankaner, Javla, Charanpura, Moti Bhadol, Vadiya(K), Mal Ankaliya, Kambola, Khakhariya, Singaniya, Mudhela, Ghantiyal, Ranipura (Samlaya), Nani Bhadol, Samlaya, Sherpura, Karachiya, Gothada, Ranchhodpura, Bahidhara Alias Natvarnagar, Bhadarva, Parthampura (Bhadarva), Jalampura, Khandi, Poicha (Raniya), Raniya, Mahapura, Ranipura(B), Namisara, Bautha, Lasundra, Pasva, Motipura, Pratapnagar, Gangadiya, Lotna, Sadra, Adalwada, Vadadala, Chandranagar, Subhelav, Paldi, Tundav, Anjesar, Moksi, Kunpad, Manjusar, Lamdapura, Zumkal, Alindra, Pilol, Indrad, Khokhar, Vemar, Garadhiya, Dhanora, Haripura,
4. Desar Taluka Villages - Tulsigam, Vachchhesar, Jambu Goral, Varsada, Waghpura, Tansiya, Himmatpura, Dungripura(I), Intvad, Nani Varnoli (Vanto), Desar, Valavav, Vejpur, Jesar Gopari, Vaktapura, Kadachhala, Manekla, Moti Varnoli, Nani Varnoli, Chhalier, Vankaneda, Ghemalpura, Dolatpura, Pipalchhat Vanto, Rampuri-Narpuri, Vadiya (Pandu), Rajupura, Limdanu Muvadu, Kalyan Patelnu Muvadu, Rajpur, Pratappura, Shihora, Gorsan, Vaghanu Muvadu, Raipura Chhatrapura, Bhila, Pandu, Pipalchhat, Sanpiya, Mokampura, Kaslapura, Vansiya, Ghanta, Andrakhiya, Limdi, Latva, Vav, Sandhasal,

== Members of Legislative Assembly ==
Election	Member	Party
1980	Prabhatsing Pamar	Indian National Congress
1985	Prakash Brahmbhatt	Janata Party
1990	Khumansinh Chauhan	Janata Party
1995	Khumansinh Chauhan	Indian National Congress
1998	Khumansinh Chauhan	Indian National Congress
2002	Upendrasinhji Gohil	Bharatiya Janata Party
2007	Khumansinh Chauhan	Indian National Congress
2012	Ketan Inamdar	Independent
2017	Ketan Inamdar	Bharatiya Janata Party
2022	Ketan Inamdar	Bharatiya Janata Party

== Election results ==
=== 2022 ===
Gujarat Assembly election, 2022: Savli
Party	Candidate	Votes	%	±%
BJP	Ketan Inamdar	102,004	58.4	
INC	Kuldipsinh Udesinh Raulji(vakil)	65,078	37.26	
AAP	Vijaykumar Narvatsinh Chavda	2,032	1.16	
NOTA	None of the above	1,594	0.91	
Majority				
Turnout				
Registered electors				
BJP hold		Swing		

=== 2017 ===
Gujarat Legislative Assembly Election, 2017: Savli
Party	Candidate	Votes	%	±%
BJP	Ketan Inamdar	97,646	59.52	New
INC	Sagar Prakash 'Koko' Brahmabhatt	56,013	34.14	+4.97'
NCP	Khumansinh Chauhan	4,060	2.47	New
Majority		41,633	25.38	+11.45
Turnout		1,64,057	77.43	+0.44
Registered electors		211,873		
BJP gain from INC		Swing		

=== 2012 ===
Gujarat Assembly Election, 2012
Party	Candidate	Votes	%	±%
Independent	Ketan Inamdar	62,849	43.10	
INC	Khumansinh Chauhan	42,530	29.17	
Majority		2	13.93	
Turnout		0percentage=76.99	{{{percentage}}}	
Independent gain from INC		Swing		

== See also ==
- List of constituencies of Gujarat Legislative Assembly
- Gujarat Legislative Assembly
