= L. A. Ravi Subramanya =

Indian politician

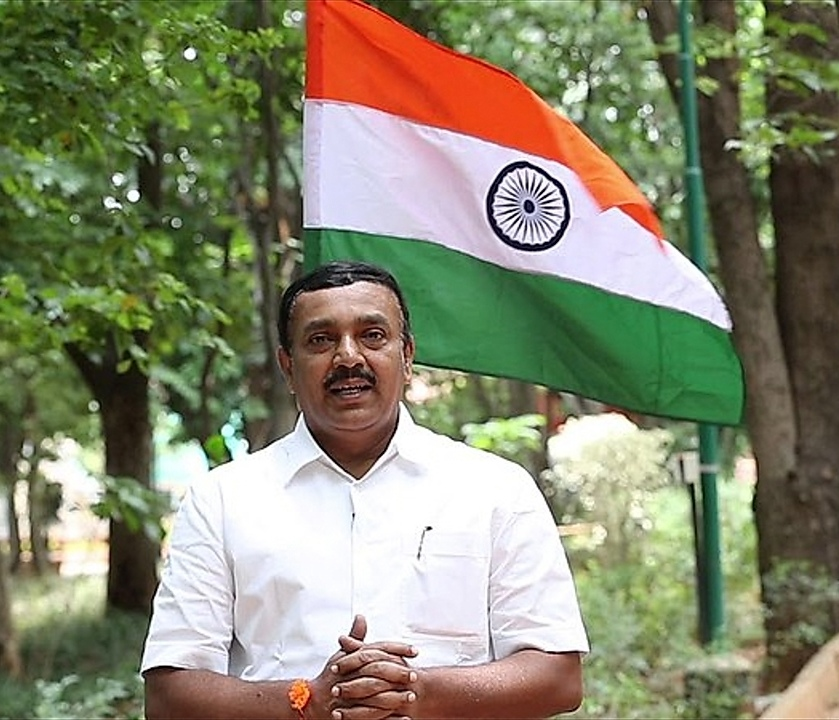

Member of the Karnataka Legislative Assembly
- Incumbent
- Assumed office 2008
- Preceded by: K. Chandrashekhar
- Constituency: Basavanagudi

Personal details
- Born: Lakya Anantharamaiah Ravi Subramanya; 20 May 1958 (age 68) Chikmagalur, Karnataka, India
- Party: Bharatiya Janata Party
- Relatives: Tejasvi Surya (nephew)
- Occupation: Politician

Lakya Anantharamaiah Ravi Subramanya (born 20 May 1958) is an Indian politician and member of the Bharatiya Janata Party. He is a member of the Karnataka Legislative Assembly from the Basavanagudi constituency in Bangalore district. He is married to Manjula Ravi Subramanya. In the 2019 Indian general election his name was one of many recommended for contesting from the Bangalore South (Lok Sabha constituency), but in the end his nephew Tejasvi Surya was chosen.

== Controversies ==
On 5 May 2021, Ravi Subrahmanya accompanied his nephew Tejasvi Surya when he claimed to have unearthed a scam in BBMP's hospital bed allocation system for COVID-19 patients. He was criticised for reading out the names of only 17 out of the 204 employees in BBMP's COVID war room; all the employees he named were Muslim and Surya was accused of communalising the issue. A total of seven people involved in the scam were arrested by the police by 10 May, with Central Crime Branch officers stating that the accused had allegedly blocked real-time data entry to the Central Hospital Bed Management System hosted by the BBMP and allowed admissions of other patients to the hospital illegally. None of those arrested were the employees named by Surya. Later, he apologised to Muslim BBMP staffers by saying that "If anyone or any community is hurt emotionally by my visit, I apologise for that.”
