= Bharatiya Janata Yuva Morcha =

Youth wing of Bharatiya Janata Party (BJP)

- President: Dr. Hemang Joshi
- Founded: 1978; 48 years ago
- Headquarters: 6-A, Deen Dayal Upadhyaya Marg, Mata Sundari Railway Colony, Mandi House, New Delhi, Delhi - 110002
- Mother party: Bharatiya Janata Party
- Website: bjym.org

The Bharatiya Janata Yuva Morcha (BJYM) (IPA: Indian People's Youth Front), also known as BJP Yuva Morcha, is the youth wing of the Bharatiya Janata Party (BJP), one of the two major political parties in India, and previously the youth wing of the dissolved Janata Party (1978—1980). It was founded in 1978, and its first national president was Kalraj Mishra. It is the second largest political youth organization in the world after Congress's youth organisation.

== Organisation ==
Dr. Hemang Joshi is the current president of BJYM since 2026, who is also Member of Parliament from Vadodara.

Prominent leaders such as Kalraj Mishra, Pramod Mahajan, Rajnath Singh, G. Kishan Reddy, Jagat Prakash Nadda, Uma Bharti, Shivraj Singh Chouhan, Dharmendra Pradhan, Anurag Thakur, Poonam Mahajan and Tejasvi Surya have served as national presidents of BJYM in the past.

The National Body of BJYM consists of Hemang Joshi, the BJYM President, Vice Presidents, General Secretaries, Secretaries, Social Media & IT incharges and National Executives Members.

== State Units ==
Sr. No.	State	State President	Ref
1	Madhya Pradesh	Shyam Tailor	
2	Rajasthan	Shankar Gora	
3	Assam	Rakesh Das	
4	Maharashtra	Krishnaraj Mahadik	
5	Tamil Nadu	S. G. Suryah	
6	Tripura	Arindam Deb	

== Activities ==
=== Attack on Delhi Chief Minister's house ===
On 30 March 2022, the official residence of Arvind Kejriwal, Chief Minister of Delhi, was allegedly attacked by members of the Bharatiya Janata Party (BJP). Deputy CM Manish Sisodia called the incident a conspiracy to murder Kejriwal. Tejasvi Surya, the national president of Bharatiya Janata Yuva Morcha (BJYM; the youth wing of the BJP) and a member of the Lok Sabha, had led a protest against Arvind Kejriwal with around 200 BJYM members. Several protesters were seen in CCTV footage breaking barriers in front of Kejriwal's residence and daubing red paint on the main gate. According to Delhi Police officials, the attackers also damaged a CCTV camera. Kejriwal's party, the Aam Aadmi Party (AAP), stated that he was not in the house at the time of the attack, but members of his family were present.

Saurabh Bhardwaj, an AAP member of the Delhi Legislative Assembly, filed a petition in the Delhi High Court seeking the formation of a special investigation team to carry out a "fair and time-bound investigation" into the incident. The petition asserted that the attack and vandalization appeared to have been carried out with the "tacit complicity" of Delhi police, and asked the court to issue directions to the Delhi Police and the Union Ministry of Home Affairs for ensuring the security of the chief minister and his residence. The court noted that the security was inadequate to control the crowd, and sought a status report of the police investigation into the incident within two weeks' time.

Delhi Police arrested eight members of BJYM in connection with the incident. A local court remanded all the arrested men into judicial custody. According to the police, all the 20 accused identified were BJYM members.

=== Attack on International Students ===
On 10 February 2026 activists of the Bharatiya Janata Yuva Morcha (BJYM) vandalised a Bangladesh-themed food stall and set fire to the country's national flag during a cultural programme at MIT World Peace University in Pune. The incident occurred in the evening at the university's Kothrud campus during the World Cultural Festival, where international students had set up food stalls representing different countries. BJYM's Pune city president, Dushyant Mohol, claimed the incident followed a dispute over the display of the Bangladesh flag. A video showing the vandalism and flag burning, accompanied by slogans, later went viral on social media.

== List of presidents ==
#	Portrait	Name	Tenure		At Age of
1		Kalraj Mishra	1978	1980	37
2		Satya Deo Singh	1980	1986	35
3		Pramod Mahajan	1986	1988	37
4		Rajnath Singh	1988	1990	37
5		Jagat Prakash Nadda	1990	1994	30
6		Uma Bharti	1994	1997	35
7		Dr. Ramashish Rai	1997	2000	33
8		Shivraj Singh Chouhan	2000	2002	41
9		G. Kishan Reddy	2002	2005	42
10		Dharmendra Pradhan	2005	2007	36
11		Amit Thaker	2007	2010	36
12		Anurag Thakur	2010	2016	36
13		Poonam Mahajan	2016	2020	36
14		Tejasvi Surya	2020	2026	30
15		Hemang Joshi	2026	present	35
