= Hemang Joshi =

Member of Parliament from Vadodara constituency

Dr. Hemang Joshi

15th President of Bharatiya Janata Yuva Morcha
- Incumbent
- Assumed office 17 August 2026
- Preceded by: Tejaswi Surya

Member of Parliament, Lok Sabha
- Incumbent
- Assumed office 4 June 2024
- Preceded by: Ranjanben Bhatt
- Constituency: Vadodara

Personal details
- Born: 31 January 1991 (age 35) Porbandar, Gujarat, India
- Party: Bharatiya Janata Party
- Occupation: Politician

Dr. Hemang Joshi (born 31 January 1991) is an Indian politician and a member of the Lok Sabha from the Vadodara Lok Sabha constituency. He is a member of the Bharatiya Janata Party. In the 2024 general election of India, he defeated Jashpalsinh Mahendrasinh Padhiyar of the Indian National Congress by 582,126 votes. He is also the 15th president of the Bharatiya Janata Yuva Morcha since 17 August s previous career was in human resources. Joshi notably questioned opposition leader Rahul Gandhi over the well being of a fellow BJP MP after a scuffle in Lok Sabha.

== See also ==
- 18th Lok Sabha
