= Raopura Assembly constituency =

Legislative Assembly constituency in Gujarat State, India

Coordinates: 22.3°N 73.2°E

Raopura
- Constituency No. 144 for the Gujarat Legislative Assembly

Constituency details
- Country: India
- Region: Western India
- State: Gujarat
- District: Vadodara
- Lok Sabha constituency: Vadodara
- Established: 1972
- Total electors: 297,989
- Reservation: None

Member of Legislative Assembly
- 15th Gujarat Legislative Assembly
- Incumbent Balkrushna Khanderao Shukla (Balu Shukla)
- Party: Bharatiya Janata Party
- Elected year: 2022

Raopura is one of the 182 Legislative Assembly constituencies of Gujarat state in India. It is part of Vadodara district.

== List of segments ==
This assembly seat represents the following segments,

1. Vadodara Taluka (Part) – Vadodara Municipal Corporation (Part) Ward No. – 1, 3, 8, Sama (OG) 14, Chhani (OG) 19.

== Members of Legislative Assembly ==
| Year | Member | Picture | Party |
|---|---|---|---|
| 2002 | Yogesh Patel | | Bharatiya Janata Party |
| 2007 | Yogesh Patel | | Bharatiya Janata Party |
| 2012 | Rajendra Trivedi | | Bharatiya Janata Party |
| 2017 | Rajendra Trivedi | | Bharatiya Janata Party |
| 2022 | Balkrishna Khanderao Shukla (Balu Shukla) | | Bharatiya Janata Party |

== Election results ==
=== 2022 ===
Gujarat Assembly election, 2022: Raopura Assembly constituency
| Party | Candidate | Votes | % | ±% |
|---|---|---|---|---|
| BJP | Balkrishna Khanderao Shukla | 119301 | 68.96 | |
| INC | Patel Sanjaybhai Ishwarbhai Sp(sanjay Patel) | 38266 | 22.12 | |
| AAP | Hiren Rameshraoraje Shirke | 10437 | 6.03 | |
| NOTA | None of the Above | 3183 | 1.84 | |
| Majority | | | 46.84 | |
| Turnout | | | | |
| Registered electors | | 295,457 | | |
| BJP hold | | Swing | | |

=== 2017 ===
Gujarat Legislative Assembly Election, 2017: Raopura
| Party | Candidate | Votes | % | ±% |
|---|---|---|---|---|
| BJP | Rajendra Trivedi | 107,225 | 58.64 | −2.50 |
| INC | Chandrakant Shrivastava | 70,529 | 38.57 | +3.01 |
| Majority | | | 20.07 | |
| Turnout | | 1,82,846 | 66.87 | |
| BJP hold | | Swing | | |

=== 2012 ===
Gujarat Assembly Election, 2012
| Party | Candidate | Votes | % | ±% |
|---|---|---|---|---|
| BJP | Rajendra Trivedi | 99,263 | 61.14 | −6.26 |
| INC | Jayesh Thakkar | 57,728 | 35.56 | +8.89 |
| Majority | | 41,535 | 25.58 | −15.15 |
| Turnout | | 1,62,348 | 68.31 | |
| BJP hold | | Swing | | |

=== 2007 ===
Gujarat Assembly Election, 2007
| Party | Candidate | Votes | % | ±% |
|---|---|---|---|---|
| BJP | Yogesh Patel | 87,589 | 67.40 | −7.98 |
| INC | Dr. Purnima Mehta | 34,666 | 26.67 | +2.05 |
| NCP | Ashok Pawar | 3,630 | 2.79 | New |
| BSP | Dinesh Patel | 1,823 | 1.4 | New |
| IND | Prakash Shah (GEB) | 1,527 | 1.17 | New |
| SS | Nilesh Patel | 726 | 0.56 | New |
| Majority | | | 40.73 | −10.03 |
| Turnout | | 1,29,961 | | |
| BJP hold | | Swing | | |

=== 2002 ===
Gujarat Assembly Election, 2002
| Party | Candidate | Votes | % | ±% |
|---|---|---|---|---|
| BJP | Yogesh Patel | 95,863 | 75.38 | |
| INC | Rameshbhai Ambalal Patel | 31,309 | 24.62 | |
| Majority | | 41535 | 50.76 | |
| Turnout | | 1,04,193 | 64.29 | |
| BJP hold | | Swing | | |

== See also ==
- List of constituencies of Gujarat Legislative Assembly
- Gujarat Legislative Assembly
