= Satyajitsinh Gaekwad =

Indian politician

Satyajitsinh Duleepsinh Gaekwad

Member of Parliament (Lok Sabha)
- In office 1996–1998
- Preceded by: Deepika Chikhalia
- Succeeded by: Jayaben Thakkar
- Constituency: Vadodara

Personal details
- Born: 3 March 1962 (age 64)
- Party: Indian National Congress

Satyajitsinh Duleepsinh Gaekwad is an Indian Politician and was a Member of Parliament of the 11th Lok Sabha of India, from 1996 to 1998. Gaekwad represented the Vadodara constituency of Gujarat and is a member of the Indian National Congress political party.
