= Akshaykumar Patel =

Indian politician

Akshay kumar Ishwarbhai Patel (born 1969) is an Indian politician from Gujarat. He is a member of the Gujarat Legislative Assembly from Karjan Assembly constituency in Vadodara district. He won the 2022 Gujarat Legislative Assembly election representing the Bharatiya Janata Party.

== Early life and education ==
Patel is from Karjan, Vadodara district, Gujarat. He is the son of Ishwarbhai Shantilal Patel. He completed his B.Sc. in 1989 at the Navsari Agricultural University, Navsari.

== Career ==
Patel won from Karjan Assembly constituency representing the Bharatiya Janata Party in the 2022 Gujarat Legislative Assembly election. He polled 83,748 votes and defeated his nearest rival, Priteshkumar Patel of the Indian National Congress, by a margin of 26,306 votes. He became an MLA for the first as a Congress candidate winning the 2017 Gujarat Legislative Assembly election by a margin of 3,564 votes. He shifted to the BJP and retained the seat in the bye election held in 2020. He won for the third time in 2022 Assembly election. Earlier, he lost the 2012 Gujarat Legislative Assembly election to Satishbhai Motibhai Patel of the BJP by a margin of 3,489 votes.
