= Pashabhai Patel =

Indian politician

Member of Parliament, Lok Sabha
- In office 1967–1971
- Preceded by: Fatehsinghrao Gaekwad
- Succeeded by: Fatehsinghrao Gaekwad
- Constituency: Vadodara

Personal details
- Born: 8 March 1901
- Party: Swatantra Party
- Spouse: Vasantben

Pashabhai Patel was an Indian politician. He was elected to the Lok Sabha, the lower house of the Parliament of India, as a member of the Swatantra Party.

He was the brother-in-law of Dahyabhai Patel, son of Vallabhbhai Patel.
