= Ranjanben Dhananjay Bhatt =

Indian politician

Ranjan Bhatt
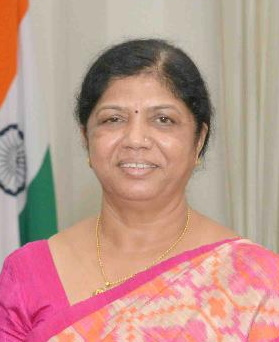

Member of Parliament, Lok Sabha
- In office 16 September 2014 – 4 June 2024
- Preceded by: Narendra Modi (vacated); Balkrishna Khanderao Shukla
- Succeeded by: Hemang Joshi
- Constituency: Vadodara

Personal details
- Born: 10 August 1962 (age 63) Bharuch, Gujarat, India
- Party: Bharatiya Janata Party
- Spouse: Dhananjay Bhatt
- Children: 2
- Website: ranjanbhatt.in

Ranjanben Dhananjay Bhatt (born 10 August 1962) is an Indian politician and a member of the Bharatiya Janata Party. She has been a member of 16th and 17th Lok Sabha.

== Career ==
Bhatt was a Deputy Mayor of Vadodara. She is credited with running and heading the "Women's Club" for the last 22 years.

She was elected to the 16th Lok Sabha from the Vadodara constituency in the 2014 bye-elections. In the 16th Lok Sabha, Bhatt has been a member of the Consultative Committee, Ministry of Water Resources, River Development and Ganga Rejuvenation. From 2014 to 2016, she was a member of the Standing Committee on Health and Family Welfare. From 2016 to 2019, she was a member of the Standing Committee on Industry.

She was reelected to 17th Lok Sabha in the 2019 Indian general election from Vadodara constituency and was appointed a member of the Standing Committee on Railways.
