= Karjan Assembly constituency =

Legislative Assembly constituency in Gujarat State, India

Coordinates: 22.05°N 73.12°E

Karjan
- Constituency No. 147 for the Gujarat Legislative Assembly

Constituency details
- Country: India
- Region: Western India
- State: Gujarat
- District: Vadodara
- Lok Sabha constituency: Bharuch
- Established: 1972
- Total electors: 213,356
- Reservation: None

Member of Legislative Assembly
- 15th Gujarat Legislative Assembly
- Incumbent Akshaykumar Ishvarbhai Patel
- Party: Bharatiya Janata Party
- Elected year: 2022

Karjan is one of the 182 Legislative Assembly constituencies of Gujarat state in India. It is part of Vadodara district.

== List of segments ==
This assembly seat represents the following segments

1. Karjan Taluka – Entire taluka except village – Umaj
2. Sinor Taluka
3. Vadodara Taluka (Part) Villages – Karali, Itola, Vadsala, Untiya (Kajapur), Por, Raman Gamdi, Gosindra, Untiya (Medhad), Sarar, Kashipura, Ankhi, Fajalpur (Ankhi)

== Members of Legislative Assembly ==
- 2007 - Chandubhai Dabhi, Indian National Congress
- 2012 - Satishbhai Patel, Bharatiya Janata Party

Year	Member	Picture	Party
2007	Chandubhai Dabhi		Indian National Congress
2012	Satishbhai Patel		Bharatiya Janata Party
2017	Akshaykumar Ishvarbhai Patel		Indian National Congress
2020 by-election	Akshaykumar Ishvarbhai Patel		Bharatiya Janata Party
2022	Akshaykumar Ishvarbhai Patel		Bharatiya Janata Party

== Election results ==
=== 2022 ===
Gujarat Assembly election, 2022:Karjan Assembly constituency
Party	Candidate	Votes	%	±%
BJP	Akshaykumar Patel	83748	54.68	
INC	Priteshkumar Janakbhai Patel Pintu Patel Vemardi	57442	37.5	
AAP	Paresh Patel(Vakil)	6587	4.3	
NOTA	None of the above	2293	1.5	
Majority			17.18	
Turnout				
Registered electors		210,883		
BJP hold		Swing		

=== 2020 ===
By-election, 2020: Karjan
Party	Candidate	Votes	%	±%
BJP	Akshaykumar Patel	76,958		
INC	Jadeja Dolubha	60,533		
NOTA	None of the above	2,299		
Majority				
Turnout		1,43,534	70.14	
BJP gain from INC		Swing		

=== 2017 ===
Gujarat Legislative Assembly Election, 2017: Karjan
Party	Candidate	Votes	%	±%
INC	Akshaykumar Patel			
NOTA	None of the Above			
Majority				
Turnout				

=== 2012 ===
Gujarat Assembly Election, 2012
Party	Candidate	Votes	%	±%
BJP	Satishbhai Patel	68225	48.26	
INC	Akshaykumar Patel	64736	45.79	
Majority		3489	2.47	
Turnout		141375	78.60	
BJP gain from INC		Swing		

== See also ==
- List of constituencies of Gujarat Legislative Assembly
- Vadodara district
