= Sayajigunj Assembly constituency =

Legislative Assembly constituency in Gujarat State, India

Coordinates: 22.31°N 73.18°E

Sayajigunj
- Constituency No. 142 for the Gujarat Legislative Assembly

Constituency details
- Country: India
- Region: Western India
- State: Gujarat
- District: Vadodara
- Lok Sabha constituency: Vadodara
- Total electors: 301,098
- Reservation: None

Member of Legislative Assembly
- 15th Gujarat Legislative Assembly
- Incumbent Keyur Rokadia
- Party: Bharatiya Janata Party
- Elected year: 2022

Sayajigunj is one of the 182 Legislative Assembly constituencies of Gujarat state in India. It is part of Vadodara district.

== List of segments ==
This assembly seat represents the following segments,

1. Vadodara Taluka (Part) – Vadodara Municipal Corporation (Part) Ward No. – 7, 10, Undera (OG) 11, Karodiya (OG) 12.

== Member of Legislative Assembly ==
- 2002 - Jitendra Sukhadiya, Bharatiya Janata Party
- 2007 - Jitendra Sukhadiya, Bharatiya Janata Party
- 2012 - Jitendra Sukhadiya, Bharatiya Janata Party

Year	Member	Party
2017	Jitendra Sukhadiya	Bharatiya Janata Party
2022	Keyur Narayandas Rokadia	Bharatiya Janata Party

== Election results ==
=== 2022 ===
Gujarat Assembly election, 2022:Sayajigunj Assembly constituency
Party	Candidate	Votes	%	±%
BJP	Keyur Rokadia	122066	68.45	−
INC	Ami Rawat	38053	21.34	−
AAP	Swejal Vyas	13080	7.33	−
Majority			47.11	
Turnout				
Registered electors		298,284		

=== 2017 ===
Gujarat Legislative Assembly Election, 2017: Sayajigunj
Party	Candidate	Votes	%	±%
BJP	Jitendra Ratilal Sukhadia (Jitubhai)	99,957	54.03	−12.23
INC	Narendra Ravat	40,825	22.07	−8.25
RSPS	Rajesh Ayare	40,665	21.98	New
Majority		59,132	31.96	−3.99
Turnout		1,85,011	67.71	−1.29
BJP hold		Swing		

=== 2012 ===
Gujarat Assembly Election, 2012
Party	Candidate	Votes	%	±%
BJP	Jitendra Sukhadiya	107358	66.26	
INC	Kiritbhai Joshi	49121	30.32	
Majority		58237	35.95	
Turnout		162016	69.00	
BJP hold		Swing		

=== 2007 ===
Gujarat Assembly Election, 2007
Party	Candidate	Votes	%	±%
BJP	Jitendra Sukhadiya	1,65,482	61.61	−8.29
INC	Rameshbhai Prajapati	89,541	33.33	+5.41
Majority			28.28	−13.2
Turnout		2,68,616		
BJP hold		Swing		

=== 2002 ===
Gujarat Assembly Election, 2002
Party	Candidate	Votes	%	±%
BJP	Jitendra Sukhadiya	1,80,066	69.40	
INC	Dalsukhbhai Prajapati	72436	27.92	
Majority			41.48	
Turnout		2,59,446	58.01	
BJP hold		Swing		

== See also ==
- List of constituencies of the Gujarat Legislative Assembly
- Vadodara district
