= Basavanagudi Assembly constituency =

Constituency of the Karnataka legislative assembly in India

Coordinates: 12.942°N 77.572°E

Basavanagudi
- Constituency No. 170 for the Karnataka Legislative Assembly

Constituency details
- Country: India
- Region: South India
- State: Karnataka
- District: Bangalore Urban
- Lok Sabha constituency: Bangalore South
- Established: 1957
- Total electors: 233,600 (2023)
- Reservation: None

Member of Legislative Assembly
- 16th Karnataka Legislative Assembly
- Incumbent L. A. Ravi Subramanya
- Party: Bharatiya Janata Party
- Elected year: 2023
- Preceded by: K. Chandrashekhar

Basavanagudi Assembly constituency is one of the 224 constituencies in the Karnataka Legislative Assembly of Karnataka, a southern state of India. Basavanagudi is also part of Bangalore South Lok Sabha constituency. It has also been considered as a stronghold of the BJP as it has won the constituency by a large margin multiple times. Congress has only won the seat once in 2004 in the span of the past 45 years. The constituency is dominated by Brahmins and Vokkaligas. Middle and upper-middle-class people are in significant numbers and senior citizens make up almost a third of the electorate.

== Members of the Legislative Assembly ==
Election	Member	Party
1952	P. R. Ramaiya	Indian National Congress
1957	L. S. Venkaji Rao	Indian National Congress
1962	M. Krishnappa	Indian National Congress
1967	P. Thimmaiah	Independent politician
1972	Amir Rahamathulla Khan	Indian National Congress
1978	T. R. Shamanna	Janata Party
1980 By-election (Note: Resigned in Jan 1980, Elected to Loksabha)	H. L. Thimme Gowda	Janata Party
1983	H. L. Thimme Gowda	Janata Party
1985	Ramakrishna Hegde	Janata Party
1989	Ramakrishna Hegde	Janata Dal
1994	H. N. Nanje Gowda	Bharatiya Janata Party
1999	K. N. Subbareddy	Bharatiya Janata Party
2004	Chandrashekhar. K	Indian National Congress
2008	L. A. Ravi Subramanya	Bharatiya Janata Party
2013	L. A. Ravi Subramanya	Bharatiya Janata Party
2018	L. A. Ravi Subramanya	Bharatiya Janata Party
2023	L. A. Ravi Subramanya	Bharatiya Janata Party

== Election results ==
=== Assembly Election 2023 ===
2023 Karnataka Legislative Assembly election : Basavanagudi
Party	Candidate	Votes	%	±%
BJP	L. A. Ravi Subramanya	78,854	61.47%	▲3.01
INC	U. B. Venkatesh	23,876	18.61%	▲9.56
JD(S)	Aramane Shankar	19,931	15.54%	▼13.69
UPP	Dr. Rajini. J	2,192	1.71%	New
NOTA	None of the above	1,656	1.29%	▼0.14
Margin of victory		54,978	42.86%	▲13.63
Turnout		128,327	54.93%	▲1.88
Total valid votes		128,286		
Registered electors		233,600		▼4.78
BJP hold		Swing	▲3.01	

=== Assembly Election 2018 ===
2018 Karnataka Legislative Assembly election : Basavanagudi
Party	Candidate	Votes	%	±%
BJP	L. A. Ravi Subramanya	76,018	58.46%	▲24.28
JD(S)	K. Bagegowda	38,009	29.23%	▲10.40
INC	M. Boregowda	11,767	9.05%	▼7.77
NOTA	None of the above	1,856	1.43%	New
Margin of victory		38,009	29.23%	▲13.87
Turnout		130,148	53.05%	▲0.72
Total valid votes		130,043		
Registered electors		245,328		▲23.51
BJP hold		Swing	▲24.28	

=== Assembly Election 2013 ===
2013 Karnataka Legislative Assembly election : Basavanagudi
Party	Candidate	Votes	%	±%
BJP	L. A. Ravi Subramanya	43,876	34.18%	▼18.03
JD(S)	K. Bagegowda	24,163	18.83%	▲12.10
INC	B. K. Chandrashekar	21,588	16.82%	▼21.68
LSP	Shanthala Dhamle	9,071	7.07%	New
KJP	Ravikiran	1,741	1.36%	New
Margin of victory		19,713	15.36%	▲1.66
Turnout		103,942	52.33%	▲9.75
Total valid votes		128,353		
Registered electors		198,633		▼12.22
BJP hold		Swing	▼18.03	

=== Assembly Election 2008 ===
2008 Karnataka Legislative Assembly election : Basavanagudi
Party	Candidate	Votes	%	±%
BJP	L. A. Ravi Subramanya	50,294	52.21%	▲11.07
INC	K. Chandrashekar	37,094	38.50%	▼12.07
JD(S)	H. M. Viswanath	6,486	6.73%	▲0.21
Margin of victory		13,200	13.70%	▲4.27
Turnout		96,361	42.58%	▼7.60
Total valid votes		96,336		
Registered electors		226,297		▲28.77
BJP gain from INC		Swing	▲1.64	

=== Assembly Election 2004 ===
2004 Karnataka Legislative Assembly election : Basavanagudi
Party	Candidate	Votes	%	±%
INC	Chandrashekhar. K	44,600	50.57%	▲20.07
BJP	K. N. Subbareddy	36,280	41.14%	▼7.30
JD(S)	Narayanaswamy. K	5,748	6.52%	▼5.96
JP	Muralimohan. T. S	674	0.76%	New
Margin of victory		8,320	9.43%	▼8.51
Turnout		88,191	50.18%	▼0.13
Total valid votes		88,191		
Registered electors		175,732		▲3.37
INC gain from BJP		Swing	▲2.13	

=== Assembly Election 1999 ===
1999 Karnataka Legislative Assembly election : Basavanagudi
Party	Candidate	Votes	%	±%
BJP	K. N. Subbareddy	41,430	48.44%	▲2.34
INC	K. M. Nagaraj	26,086	30.50%	▲3.91
JD(S)	H. N. Nanje Gowda	10,671	12.48%	New
JD(U)	Anant Nag	5,791	6.77%	New
Margin of victory		15,344	17.94%	▼1.57
Turnout		85,530	50.31%	▼8.97
Total valid votes		85,530		
Registered electors		170,006		▲14.61
BJP hold		Swing	▲2.34	

=== Assembly Election 1994 ===
1994 Karnataka Legislative Assembly election : Basavanagudi
Party	Candidate	Votes	%	±%
BJP	H. N. Nanje Gowda	40,013	46.10%	▲30.95
INC	Vajramuni	23,077	26.59%	▼2.96
JD	Sriganesh	19,960	23.00%	▼15.79
JP	N. Shankare Gowda	1,246	1.44%	New
INC	Sundar Raj	982	1.13%	New
Independent	M. Siddappa	599	0.69%	New
Margin of victory		16,936	19.51%	▲10.27
Turnout		87,928	59.28%	▼2.29
Total valid votes		86,800		
Rejected ballots		1,128	1.28%	▼2.01
Registered electors		148,332		▼3.07
BJP gain from JD		Swing	▲7.31	

=== Assembly Election 1989 ===
1989 Karnataka Legislative Assembly election : Basavanagudi
Party	Candidate	Votes	%	±%
JD	Ramakrishna Hegde	35,342	38.79%	New
INC	Haranahalli Ramaswamy	26,924	29.55%	▲6.73
BJP	H. Subramanya Jois	13,802	15.15%	New
JP	B. L. Shankar	12,905	14.16%	New
Margin of victory		8,418	9.24%	▼44.29
Turnout		94,217	61.57%	▼0.33
Total valid votes		91,118		
Rejected ballots		3,099	3.29%	▲2.61
Registered electors		153,024		▲17.72
JD gain from JP		Swing	▼37.56	

=== Assembly Election 1985 ===
1985 Karnataka Legislative Assembly election : Basavanagudi
Party	Candidate	Votes	%	±%
JP	Ramakrishna Hegde	61,018	76.35%	▲31.03
INC	K. M. Nagaraj	18,238	22.82%	▲3.56
Margin of victory		42,780	53.53%	▲37.58
Turnout		80,464	61.90%	▼0.20
Total valid votes		79,917		
Rejected ballots		547	0.68%	▼1.13
Registered electors		129,994		▲10.30
JP hold		Swing	▲31.03	

=== Assembly Election 1983 ===
1983 Karnataka Legislative Assembly election : Basavanagudi
Party	Candidate	Votes	%	±%
JP	H. L. Thimme Gowda	32,567	45.32%	▲9.72
BJP	S. B. Swethadri	21,108	29.37%	▲1.80
INC	V. Anniah	13,838	19.26%	New
Independent	B. Krishna Bhat	1,480	2.06%	New
Independent	Seshadri	949	1.32%	New
Independent	C. Mahadevaswamy	581	0.81%	New
Margin of victory		11,459	15.95%	▲14.49
Turnout		73,188	62.10%	
Total valid votes		71,865		
Rejected ballots		1,323	1.81%	
Registered electors		117,858		
JP hold		Swing	▲9.72	

=== Assembly By-election 1980 ===
1980 Karnataka Legislative Assembly by-election : Basavanagudi
Party	Candidate	Votes	%	±%
JP	H. L. Thimme Gowda	17,242	35.60%	▼39.15
INC(I)	N. L. Rau	16,534	34.14%	▲11.38
BJP	S. B. Swethadri	13,356	27.57%	New
Independent	C. M. Swamy	765	1.58%	New
Margin of victory		708	1.46%	▼50.53
Total valid votes		48,436		
JP hold		Swing	▼39.15	

=== Assembly Election 1978 ===
1978 Karnataka Legislative Assembly election : Basavanagudi
Party	Candidate	Votes	%	±%
JP	T. R. Shamanna	47,362	74.75%	New
INC(I)	Narasinga Rao. D. S	14,418	22.76%	New
INC	Panduranga. D	840	1.33%	▼32.47
Independent	C. Mahadevaswamy	441	0.70%	New
Margin of victory		32,944	51.99%	▲42.74
Turnout		64,596	65.91%	▲15.86
Total valid votes		63,360		
Rejected ballots		1,236	1.91%	▲1.91
Registered electors		98,001		▲5.30
JP gain from INC		Swing	▲40.95	

=== Assembly Election 1972 ===
1972 Mysore State Legislative Assembly election : Basavanagudi
Party	Candidate	Votes	%	±%
INC	Amir Rahamathulla Khan	15,320	33.80%	▲1.24
INC(O)	S. P. Rajanna	11,126	24.55%	New
ABJS	S. Krishnaiah	8,120	17.92%	New
Independent	Hyder Azee Khan	5,387	11.89%	New
Independent	J. Dhanapal	4,943	10.91%	New
Margin of victory		4,194	9.25%	▲6.41
Turnout		46,579	50.05%	▲4.26
Total valid votes		45,322		
Registered electors		93,065		▲34.68
INC gain from Independent		Swing	▼1.60	

=== Assembly Election 1967 ===
1967 Mysore State Legislative Assembly election : Basavanagudi
Party	Candidate	Votes	%	±%
Independent	P. Thimmaiah	10,495	35.40%	New
INC	M. Krishnappa	9,653	32.56%	▼15.89
SWA	B. R. Ramaiah	3,028	10.21%	▼12.93
Independent	J. Dhanapal	2,746	9.26%	New
Independent	M. Masthan	2,213	7.46%	New
Independent	Panduranga. D	673	2.27%	New
Independent	K. B. Srinivasan	668	2.25%	New
Margin of victory		842	2.84%	▼22.48
Turnout		31,637	45.79%	▼7.79
Total valid votes		29,646		
Registered electors		69,099		▲36.31
Independent gain from INC		Swing	▼13.05	

=== Assembly Election 1962 ===
1962 Mysore State Legislative Assembly election : Basavanagudi
Party	Candidate	Votes	%	±%
INC	M. Krishnappa	12,676	48.45%	▼10.06
SWA	V. T. Sreenivasan	6,053	23.14%	New
Independent	Thimmesh Prabhu. M. K	4,752	18.16%	New
ABJS	M. A. Venkata Rao	2,681	10.25%	New
Margin of victory		6,623	25.32%	▼8.35
Turnout		27,161	53.58%	▲9.82
Total valid votes		26,162		
Registered electors		50,692		▲20.12
INC hold		Swing	▼10.06	

=== Assembly Election 1957 ===
1957 Mysore State Legislative Assembly election : Basavanagudi
Party	Candidate	Votes	%	±%
INC	L. S. Venkaji Rao	10,804	58.51%	▲3.84
Independent	Lakshninarayana Gupta. C. S	4,587	24.84%	New
Independent	Vimala	1,580	8.56%	New
Independent	Thimmesh Prabhu. M. K	899	4.87%	New
ABJS	K. Srinivasa Rao	595	3.22%	▼3.00
Margin of victory		6,217	33.67%	▼1.61
Turnout		18,465	43.76%	▼2.63
Total valid votes		18,465		
Registered electors		42,200		▲7.00
INC hold		Swing	▲3.84	

=== Assembly Election 1952 ===
1952 Mysore State Legislative Assembly election : Basavanagudi
Party	Candidate	Votes	%	±%
INC	P. R. Ramaiya	10,003	54.67%	New
Socialist Party (India)	K. R. Sreekanteswar	3,548	19.39%	New
KMPP	R. Dayanandasagar	2,460	13.45%	New
ABJS	Devadu Narasimha Sastry	1,138	6.22%	New
Independent	B. S. Mariyappa	591	3.23%	New
Independent	Kanniah	556	3.04%	New
Margin of victory		6,455	35.28%	
Turnout		18,296	46.39%	
Total valid votes		18,296		
Registered electors		39,440		
INC win (new seat)				

== See also ==
- Basavanagudi
- Bangalore Urban district
- List of constituencies of Karnataka Legislative Assembly
