= M. Krishnappa (politician, born 1918) =

Indian politician

Member of the Karnataka Legislative Council
- In office 2 May 1967 – 18 May 1970
- Succeeded by: Ullal G. S.
- Constituency: Bangalore Local Authorities

Member of the Karnataka Legislative Assembly
- In office 1962–1967
- Preceded by: L. S. Venkaji Rao
- Succeeded by: P. Thimmaiah
- Constituency: Basavanagudi

Mayor of Bangalore
- In office 1956–1957
- Preceded by: V.P. Deenadayalu Naidu
- Succeeded by: B. Indiramma

Personal details
- Born: 14 April 1918
- Died: 7 February 1984 (aged 65)
- Political party: Indian National Congress

M. Krishnappa (14 April 1918 – 7 February 1984) was an Indian politician from the state of Karnataka.

== Personal life ==
He was born on 14 April 1918 in a farming family. Horticulture was his profession and Agriculture was his hobby. He stayed at No. 15, Lalbagh Road, Bangalore. He earned a BSc Graduate from Bangalore University. He was a Senate Member at Rajiv Gandhi the University of Health Science, Karnataka. He died on 7 February 1984.

== Career ==
He supported Congress Party since 1942 and joined the Party in 1950. Later he was elected unopposed to the Bangalore City Corporation. He was elected as chairman of the Works Committee for 2 years from 1955. Becoming the first citizen of Bangalore in 1956 and remained in the post for a year. He became a Member of Mysore Pradesh Congress Committee in 1960. He was later elected to the Mysore Legislative Assembly from Basavangudi Constituency in 1962 Mysore Legislative Assembly elections. He was nominated as President of Bangalore City District Congress Committee (BCDCC) in 1964, for a tenure of 3 years, later elevated as member of All India Congress Committee. He was made a member of Mysore Legislative Council in 1967 for a term of 3 years.
