= Akoti, Gujarat =

Coordinates: 21°10′N 73°11′E

Akoti, Gujarat is a small village located in Bardoli Taluka of Gujarat. It is surrounded by the villages Palsod, Mangrolia, Samthan, Orgam, Kantali. Its main crops include sugar cane, rice, wheat, cotton, tuber, vegetables, bananas, peanuts.

== See also ==
- List of tourist attractions in Surat
