= Lalji Kanpariya =

Indian poet (born 1943)

Lalji Kanpariya is a Gujarati poet from Gujarat, India.

Lalji Kanpariya was born on 13 August 1943 in Vitthalpur village in Amreli district, Gujarat, India. He completed his B.A. in 1966 from Gujarat University and M.A. in 1971 from Saurashtra University; both with Gujarati and Sanskrit subjects. He taught at Prataprai Arts College before retirement.

He writes geet, ghazal, metre and non-metre poetry. His first collection of poems Zalmal Tanu (1994) received Jayant Pathak Kavita Prize and prize by Gujarati Sahitya Parishad. His second poetry collection Nava Chandrani Kumpal (1999) received Raskavi Raghunath Brahmabhatt Award and Ramesh Parekh Sahitya Ratna Award. His other collections are Shamanana Chitaraman (2005), Harina Hastakshar (2006) and Surya Chandrani Sakhe (2007).
