= Rajendra Trivedi =

Indian politician

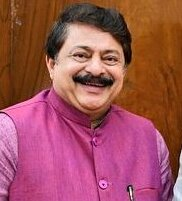

Cabinet Minister Government of Gujarat
- In office 16 September 2021 – 8 December 2022
- Ministry: Term
- Minister of Revenue: 16 September 2021 - 20 August 2022
- Minister of Law: 16 September 2021 - 8 December 2022
- Minister of Parliamentary Affairs: 16 September 2021 - 8 December 2022
- Minister of Disaster Management: 16 September 2021 - 8 December 2022

Speaker of Gujarat Legislative Assembly
- In office 19 February 2018 – 16 September 2021
- Preceded by: Ramanlal Vora
- Succeeded by: Nimaben Acharya

Minister of state Government of Gujarat
- In office 7 August 2016 – 26 December 2017
- Ministry: Term
- Minister of Sports, Youth Affairs & Cultural Activities (Independent charge): 7 August 2016 - 26 December 2017
- Minister of Pilgrimage Development: 7 August 2016 - 26 December 2017

Member of Gujarat Legislative Assembly
- In office 2012–2022
- Preceded by: Yogesh Patel
- Succeeded by: Balkrushna Khanderao Shukla
- Constituency: Raopura

Personal details
- Born: Rajendra Suryaprasad Trivedi; 19 June 1954 (age 71) Vadodara, Bombay State, India
- Spouse: Sudhaben Rajendra Trivedi
- Children: Two sons (Adv Abhiraj Trivedi & Adv Pavan Trivedi), one daughter (Vidhi Trivedi)
- Parent(s): Shri Suryaprasad Ramprasad Trivedi (father); Shri Kusumben Suryaprasad Trivedi (mother)

Advocate Rajendra Suryaprasad Trivedi, also known as Rajubhai Vakil, is the former Cabinet Minister of Gujarat and the former Speaker of Gujarat Legislative Assembly and was the Minister of Gujarat for Sports, Youth and Cultural activities department (Independent charge) and Pilgrimage Development in Vijay Rupani Ministry.

He is the serving MLA from Raopura of Vadodara District, Gujarat.

He was re elected in 2017 Gujarat Assembly Election from Raopura (Vidhan Sabha constituency) with a margin of more than 40000 votes.
