= Prakash Brahmbhatt =

Indian politician

Member of Parliament, Lok Sabha
- In office 1989–1991
- Preceded by: Ranjitsinh Gaekwad
- Succeeded by: Deepika Chikhalia
- Constituency: Baroda

Personal details
- Born: 30 August 1951 Radhanpur, Banaskantha district, Gujarat
- Party: Janata Dal
- Other political affiliations: Janata Party
- Spouse: Rashmi Brahmbhatt
- Children: 2 sons
- Education: M.Com., LL.B.
- Alma mater: Maharaja Sayajirao University of Baroda

Prakash Brahmbhatt is an Indian politician from Janata Dal. He was a member of 6th Lok Sabha from Baroda. He was elected to Gujarat Legislative Assembly. He was a member Janata Party's National Council in 1981-82.
