= Vadodara Lok Sabha constituency =

Lok Sabha constituency in Gujarat

Coordinates: 22.18°N 73.12°E

Vadodara
- Lok Sabha constituency
- Vadodara district in Gujarat

Constituency details
- Country: India
- Region: Western India
- State: Gujarat
- Assembly constituencies: Savli; Vaghodiya; Vadodara City; Sayajigunj; Akota; Raopura; Manjalpur
- Established: 1957
- Total electors: 1,949,573 (2024)
- Reservation: None

Member of Parliament
- 18th Lok Sabha
- Incumbent Hemang Joshi
- Party: Bharatiya Janata Party
- Elected year: 2024

Vadodara (formerly Baroda) is one of the 26 Lok Sabha (lower house of Indian parliament) constituencies in Gujarat, a state in Western India. This constituency covers 7 out of 10 Vidhan Sabha constituencies of Vadodara district and first held elections in 1957 as Baroda Lok Sabha constituency in erstwhile Bombay State (present day Gujarat). It has been known as Vadodara since the 2009 elections. Its first member of parliament (MP) was Fatehsinghrao Gaekwad of the Indian National Congress (INC) who was also re-elected in the next elections in 1962. He was the Maharaja of Baroda of the Gaekwad dynasty at the time. P. C. Patel of the Swatantra Party won the election in 1967. From 1971 to 1980, Gaekwad was MP of this constituency again firstly as a member of the Indian National Congress (Organisation) and then as a member of the INC. His younger brother, Ranjitsinh Pratapsinh Gaekwad also of the INC represented the constituency from 1980 to 1989 for two terms before being defeated by Prakash Brahmbhatt of the Janata Dal party in the 1989 election.

In 1991, television actress Deepika Chikhalia of the Bharatiya Janata Party (BJP) won the seat. She was best known at the time for playing Sita, Hindu god Rama's wife in the highly popular television adaptation of the Hindu religious epic, Ramayan. Satyasinh Dilipsinh Gaekwad of the INC won the election in 1996. In all, three members of the Gaekwad royal family have represented this seat as an MP. The constituency has been represented by a member of the BJP since 1998: Jayaben Thakkar served for three terms from 1998 to 2009 and Balkrishna Khanderao Shukla served one term from 2009 to 2014. The current prime minister, Narendra Modi won the seat in the 2014 elections by a victory margin of 570,128 votes, which is one of the highest margins in history of Lok Sabha polls. However he chose to vacate the seat on 29 May to comply with election rules barring an MP from representing two constituencies and instead retained his seat in Varanasi in Uttar Pradesh. In the subsequent by election, Ranjanben Dhananjay Bhatt of the BJP was elected and currently represents the constituency as its MP.

== Assembly segments ==
Constituency number	Name	Reserved for (SC/ST/None)	District	Party	2024 Lead
135	Savli	None	Vadodara	BJP	BJP
136	Vaghodiya	None	Vadodara	BJP	BJP
141	Vadodara City	SC	Vadodara	BJP	BJP
142	Sayajigunj	None	Vadodara	BJP	BJP
143	Akota	None	Vadodara	BJP	BJP
144	Raopura	None	Vadodara	BJP	BJP
145	Manjalpur	None	Vadodara	BJP	BJP

== Members of Parliament ==
Year	Winner	Party
1952	Indubhai Amin	Independent
1957	Fatehsinghrao Gaekwad	Indian National Congress
1962	Fatehsinghrao Gaekwad	Indian National Congress
1967	Pashabhai Patel	Swatantra Party
1971	Fatehsinghrao Gaekwad	Indian National Congress (O)
1977	Fatehsinghrao Gaekwad	Indian National Congress
1980	Ranjitsinh Gaekwad	Indian National Congress (I)
1984	Ranjitsinh Gaekwad	Indian National Congress
1989	Prakash Brahmbhatt	Janata Dal
1991	Deepika Chikhalia	Bharatiya Janata Party
1996	Satyajitsinh Gaekwad	Indian National Congress
1998	Jayaben Thakkar	Bharatiya Janata Party
1999	Jayaben Thakkar	Bharatiya Janata Party
2004	Jayaben Thakkar	Bharatiya Janata Party
2009	Balkrishna Shukla	Bharatiya Janata Party
2014	Narendra Modi	Bharatiya Janata Party
2014^	Ranjanben Bhatt	Bharatiya Janata Party
2019	Ranjanben Bhatt	Bharatiya Janata Party
2024	Hemang Joshi	Bharatiya Janata Party

- ^By Election

== Election results ==
=== General election 1957 ===
1957 Indian general election: Baroda
Party	Candidate	Votes	%	±%
INC	Fatehsinghrao Gaekwad	151,461	63.30	N/A
Independent	Patel Pashabhai Chhotabhai	87,815	36.70	N/A
Margin of victory		63,646	26.60	N/A
Turnout		239,276	64.00	N/A
INC win (new seat)				

=== General election 1962 ===
1962 Indian general election: Baroda
Party	Candidate	Votes	%	±%
INC	Fatehsinghrao Gaekwad	189,562	73.08	+9.78
Independent	Mithabhai Jorabhai Patel	45,590	17.58	N/A
Independent	Kikubhai Pranshankar Bhatt	16,574	6.39	N/A
Independent	Bachubhai Girdharlal Arya	7,667	2.96	N/A
Margin of victory		143,972	55.50	+28.90
Turnout		273,079	61.22	−2.78
INC hold		Swing		

=== General election 1967 ===
1967 Indian general election: Baroda
Party	Candidate	Votes	%	±%
SWA	P. C. Patel	152,903	52.86	N/A
INC	N. D. Choksi	130,586	45.15	−27.93
Independent	R. C. Patel	5,758	1.99	N/A
Margin of victory		22,317	7.71	−47.79
Turnout		304,363	68.08	+6.86
SWA gain from INC		Swing		

=== General election 1971 ===
1971 Indian general election: Baroda
Party	Candidate	Votes	%	±%
INC(O)	Fatehsinghrao Gaekwad	169,382	62.79	N/A
PSP	Sanat Mehta	97,418	36.11	N/A
Bharatiya Kranti Dal	Kikubhai Pranshankar Bhatt	2,944	1.09	N/A
Margin of victory		71,964	26.68	+18.97
Turnout		275,882	57.17	−10.91
INC(O) gain from SWA		Swing		

=== General election 1977 ===
1977 Indian general election: Baroda
Party	Candidate	Votes	%	±%
INC	Fatehsinghrao Gaekwad	219,101	54.18	N/A
JP	Patel Manubhai Motilal	178,178	44.06	N/A
Independent	Saiyad Najarali Chimanbapu	3,141	0.78	N/A
Independent	Thakorlal Chandulal Shah	2,908	0.72	N/A
Independent	Barot Ramesh Bhai Bhupatbhai	743	0.18	N/A
Independent	Bhavsagar Thakorlal Parsottamdas	316	0.08	N/A
Margin of victory		40,923	10.12	−16.56
Turnout		411,857	69.14	+11.97
INC gain from INC(O)		Swing		

=== General election 1980 ===
1980 Indian general election: Baroda
Party	Candidate	Votes	%	±%
INC(I)	Ranjitsinh Pratapsinh Gaekwad	265,277	56.67	+2.49
JP	Patel Prabhudas Khushalbhai	169,784	36.27	N/A
INC(U)	Ashwinkumar Chimanlal Shah	10,633	2.27	N/A
Independent	Thakor Shah	2,875	0.61	N/A
Independent	Patel Dushyant Ramjibhai	2,134	0.46	N/A
Independent	Oza Mohan Maneklal	2,051	0.44	N/A
Independent	Gandotra Shyamsunder (Swami Trimurti)	1,553	0.33	N/A
Independent	Gandotra Vina S.	1,481	0.32	N/A
Margin of victory		95,493	20.40	+10.28
Turnout		468,156	64.38	−4.76
INC(I) gain from INC		Swing	+2.49	

=== General election 1984 ===
1984 Indian general election: Baroda
Party	Candidate	Votes	%	±%
INC	Ranjitsinh Pratapsinh Gaekwad	296,716	54.99	−1.68
BJP	Jaspalsing Niranjansing	144,614	26.80	N/A
JP	Patel Manubhai Motibhai	65,381	12.12	−24.15
Independent	Dangiwala Abdulaji Gulamhusain	4,939	0.92	N/A
Independent	S. L. Patel	4,014	0.74	N/A
Doordarshi Party	Pandya Kiran Balkrushna	2,660	0.49	N/A
Independent	Vasava Harilal Punabhai	2,249	0.42	N/A
Independent	Makwana Bhogibhai Purushotambhai	1,635	0.30	N/A
Independent	Gandotra S. M.	1,404	0.26	N/A
Independent	Raulji Kodarbhai Takhatsinh	936	0.17	N/A
Independent	Prakash Patel (Dadh)	922	0.17	N/A
Independent	Rana Shanabhai Dhulabhai	572	0.11	N/A
Margin of victory		152,102	28.19	+7.79
Turnout		539,616	62.73	−1.65
INC hold		Swing		

=== General election 1989 ===
1989 Indian general election: Baroda
Party	Candidate	Votes	%	±%
JD	Prakash Koko Brahmbhatt	346,397	50.59	N/A
INC	Ranjitsinh Pratapsinh Gaekwad	293,499	42.87	−12.12
Independent	Bandukwala Juzar Salebhai	30,195	4.41	N/A
Independent	S. L. Patel	7,787	1.14	+0.40
Independent	Jaspal Singh	1,828	0.27	N/A
Doordarshi Party	Jayaben Thakkar	1,558	0.23	−0.26
Independent	Prem Jayprakash B. Prem	1,102	0.16	N/A
LKD	Saiyed Abdulazizjjalaludin	949	0.14	N/A
Independent	Sadariy Atmaram Bhikhabhai	581	0.08	N/A
Independent	Kanchanbhai Kalabhai Rohit	413	0.06	N/A
Independent	Vaghela Piyushkumar Lalgibhai	396	0.06	N/A
Margin of victory		52,898	7.72	−20.47
Turnout		704,314	63.49	+0.76
JD gain from INC		Swing		

=== General election 1991 ===
1991 Indian general election: Baroda
Party	Candidate	Votes	%	±%
BJP	Deepika Chikhalia	276,038	49.98	N/A
INC	Ranjitsinh Pratapsinh Gaekwad	241,850	43.79	+0.92
JD	Prakash Koko Brahmbhatt	28,486	5.16	−45.43
JP	Manubhai Maganbhai Patel	1,265	0.23	N/A
Independent	Sharma Rajendra Laxmichand	916	0.17	N/A
Independent	Ramjibhai Punabhai Yadav	887	0.16	N/A
Azad Hind Fauz (Rajkiya)	Sureshbhai Chaturbhai Patel	623	0.11	N/A
Independent	Piyushkumar Laljibhai Waghela	503	0.09	N/A
Independent	Trilochan Singh Paramhans (Gandotra)	500	0.09	N/A
Doordarshi Party	Jayaben Thakkar	405	0.07	−0.16
Independent	S. L. Patel	284	0.05	−1.09
Sr. Citizens National Party of India	Occhavlal Dalsukhbhai Shah	250	0.05	N/A
Independent	Rajnikant alias Gopalbhai Ambalal	197	0.04	N/A
Yuva Vikas Party	Patel Iqbal Ismil	110	0.02	N/A
Margin of victory		34,188	6.19	−1.53
Turnout		559,779	48.66	−14.83
BJP gain from JD		Swing		

=== General election 1996 ===
1996 Indian general election: Baroda
Party	Candidate	Votes	%	±%
INC	Satyasinh Dilipsinh Gaekwad	131,248	30.97	−12.82
BJP	Jitendra Ratilal Sukhadia (Jitubhai)	131,231	30.96	−19.02
Independent	Subhanginiraje Ranjitsinh Gaekwad	100,678	23.75	N/A
Independent	Madhubhai Shrivastav	50,941	12.02	N/A
Independent	Varma Vikramsingh Laxmichand	1,181	0.28	N/A
Independent	Patel Vitthalbhai Kasibhai	842	0.20	N/A
Independent	Jadhav Arun Kashiram	778	0.18	N/A
Independent	Harish Madhukar Jamdar	766	0.18	N/A
Independent	Sindha Ranjitsinh Babubhai	605	0.14	N/A
Akhil Bharatiya Jan Sangh	Gandotra S. M.	556	0.13	N/A
Independent	Piyushkumar Laljibhai Vaghela	480	0.11	N/A
Independent	Ramanbhai Dhurabhai Patel	457	0.11	N/A
Independent	Patel Kamleshbhai Ramanbhai	413	0.10	N/A
SAP	Mohanlal Patel	394	0.09	N/A
Independent	Saroj Ramkailash Ramnareshbhai	390	0.09	N/A
Independent	Patel Pravinchandra Mangalbhai	378	0.09	N/A
Independent	Maruti Sudamji Maharaj	350	0.08	N/A
Independent	Sardar Ranjitsinh Arjunsinh	303	0.07	N/A
Independent	Kanchanbhai Shanabhai Rana	288	0.07	N/A
Independent	Jagdishsinh Gambhirsinh Chauhan	279	0.07	N/A
Independent	Patel Natvarlal Lalbhai	279	0.07	N/A
Independent	Vyas Amit	249	0.06	N/A
Independent	S. L. Patel	237	0.06	+0.01
Independent	Meghvani Laxmanbhai Rupchand	161	0.04	N/A
Independent	Vyas Prafulchandra Jayendrakumar	159	0.04	N/A
Independent	Modi Daxesh Chandrakantbhai	128	0.03	N/A
Independent	Mukeshbhai Chandulal Patel (BAPA)	60	0.01	N/A
Margin of victory		17	0.01	−6.18
Turnout		437,236	31.31	−17.35
INC gain from BJP		Swing		

=== General election 1998 ===
1998 Indian general election: Baroda
Party	Candidate	Votes	%	±%
BJP	Jayaben Bharatkumar Thakkar	387,798	49.36	+18.40
INC	Satyasinh Duleepsinh Gaekwad	335,381	42.68	+11.71
RJP	Deviyanidevi Ashokraje Gaekwad	52,909	6.73	N/A
SP	Bharwad Ranubhai Bhikhabhai	5,404	0.70	N/A
Ajeya Bharat Party	Raste Janardan Gopal	2,992	0.38	N/A
Independent	Gandotra S. M.	1,180	0.15	N/A
Margin of victory		52,417	6.68	+6.67
Turnout		814,838	58.02	+26.71
BJP gain from INC		Swing		

=== General election 1999 ===
1999 Indian general election: Baroda
Party	Candidate	Votes	%	±%
BJP	Jayaben Bharatkumar Thakkar	322,758	55.17	+5.81
INC	Urmilaben Chimanbhai Patel	230,109	39.33	−3.35
NCP	Gohil Upendrasinh Pratapsinh	27,813	4.75	N/A
BSP	Pawar Prem Jayprakash	2,962	0.51	N/A
JD(U)	Desai Satishbhai Nanubhai	687	0.12	N/A
Independent	Verma Vikramsinh Laxmichand	379	0.06	N/A
Independent	Taank Chatrasang Rustombhai	318	0.05	N/A
Margin of victory		92,649	15.84	+9.16
Turnout		596,790	41.47	−16.55
BJP hold		Swing		

=== General election 2004 ===
2004 Indian general election: Baroda
Party	Candidate	Votes	%	±%
BJP	Jayaben Thakkar	316,089	48.45	−6.72
INC	Satyajitsinh Duleepsinh Gaekwad	309,486	47.44	+8.11
BSP	Kalodia Shardaben Surendrasinh	8,766	1.34	+0.83
Independent	Prem Jayprakash Biharilal	7,959	1.22	N/A
Independent	Tapanbhai Dasgupta	5,234	0.80	N/A
ABHM	Hasmukh Shivabhai Patel (Ayurvedacharya)	4,875	0.75	N/A
Margin of victory		6,603	1.01	−14.83
Turnout		652,409		
BJP hold		Swing		

=== General election 2009 ===
2009 Indian general election: Vadodara
Party	Candidate	Votes	%	±%
BJP	Balkrishna Khanderao Shukla	428,833	57.40	+8.95
INC	Satyajitsinh Dulipsinh Gaekwad	292,805	39.19	−8.25
Independent	Vasava Harilal Shanabhai	9,896	1.32	N/A
BSP	Purohit Vinaykumar Ramanbhai	6,163	0.82	−0.52
Independent	Girishbhai Madhavlal Bhavsar	4,087	0.55	N/A
Independent	Tapan Dasgupta (Tapanbhai)	2,917	0.39	−0.41
Independent	Thavardas Amulrai Choithani	2,428	0.32	N/A
Majority		136,028	18.21	+17.20
Turnout		747,124	49.02	
BJP hold		Swing	+8.95	

=== General election 2014 ===
2014 Indian general elections: Vadodara
Party	Candidate	Votes	%	±%
BJP	Narendra Modi	845,464	72.75	+15.35
INC	Madhusudan Mistry	275,336	23.69	−15.48
AAP	Sunil Digambar Kulkarni	10,101	0.87	N/A
BSP	Rohit Madhusudan Mohanbhai	5,782	0.50	−0.32
SUCI(C)	Tapan Dasgupta	2,249	0.19	N/A
SP	Sahebkhan Asifkhan Pathan	2,101	0.18	N/A
JD(U)	Ambalal Kanabhai Jadav	1,382	0.12	N/A
Apna Desh Party	Pathan Mahemudkhan Razakkhan	1,109	0.10	N/A
NOTA	None of the Above	18,053	1.55	N/A
Majority		570,128	49.06	+30.85
Turnout		1,162,168	70.94	+21.82
Registered electors		1,590,810		
BJP hold		Swing	+15.42	

=== By election 2014 ===
2014 By Election: Vadodara
Party	Candidate	Votes	%	±%
BJP	Ranjanben Dhananjay Bhatt	526,763	71.93	−0.86
INC	Narendra Ambalal Ravat	197,256	26.94	+3.24
Independent	Govind Bhikhabhai Parmar	4,788	0.65	N/A
Independent	Pareshbhai Shankarlal Patel (Dattu)	3,532	0.48	N/A
NOTA	None of the above	14,257	1.95	+0.40
Margin of victory		329,507	44.99	−4.09
Turnout		746,769	45.57	−25.33
BJP hold		Swing	-2.05	

=== General election 2019 ===
2019 Indian general elections: Vadodara
Party	Candidate	Votes	%	±%
BJP	Ranjanben Dhananjay Bhatt	883,719	72.30	+0.37
INC	Prashant Chandubhai Patel	294,542	24.10	−2.84
NOTA	None of the Above	16,999	1.39	
Majority		589,177	48.20	+3.21
Turnout		1,223,709	68.18	+22.61
Registered electors		1,794,896		
BJP hold		Swing	+2.47	

=== General election 2024 ===
2024 Indian general elections: Vadodara
Party	Candidate	Votes	%	±%
BJP	Hemang Joshi	873,189	72.04	▼0.26
INC	Jashpalsinh Padhiyar	2,91,063	24.01	▼0.09
NOTA	None of the Above	18,388	1.52	▲0.13
Majority		5,82,126	48.02	▼0.18
Turnout		12,13,696	62.24	
BJP hold		Swing		

== See also ==
- Vadodara district
- List of constituencies of the Lok Sabha
