= Lalji Mer =

Indian politician

Laljibhai Chaturbhai Mer

Member of Gujarat Legislative Assembly
- In office 2012–2017
- President: Pranab Mukherjee
- Prime Minister: Manmohan Singh
- Governor: Kamla Beniwal
- Vice President: Mohammad Hamid Ansari

Personal details
- Party: Indian National Congress
- Other political affiliations: Bhartiya Janata Party
- Parent: Chaturbhai Hanubhai Mer

Laljibhai Chaturbhai Mer is an Indian politician and former Member of legislative assembly for Dhandhuka constituency as Bhartiya Janata Party (BJP) candidate. In 2018, he joined Indian National Congress party. Mer belongs to the Koli caste of Gujarat.

During his resignation, he said that BJP is an anti-farmer party, so he can not be in this party.
