= Jayaben Thakkar =

Indian politician

MP
- In office 1998–2009
- Constituency: Vadodara

Personal details
- Born: 14 May 1952 (age 73) Baroda, Bombay State, India
- Party: Bharatiya Janata Party
- Spouse: Shri Bharatkumar H. Thakkar
- Children: 2 sons
- As of 25 February, 2006

Jayaben Thakkar (born 14 May 1952) is a former member of Lok Sabha. She represented the Vadodara constituency of Gujarat in the 14th Lok Sabha and is a member of the Bharatiya Janata Party.
