= Vadodara district =

District of Gujarat, India

Vadodara district Baroda district
- District of Gujarat
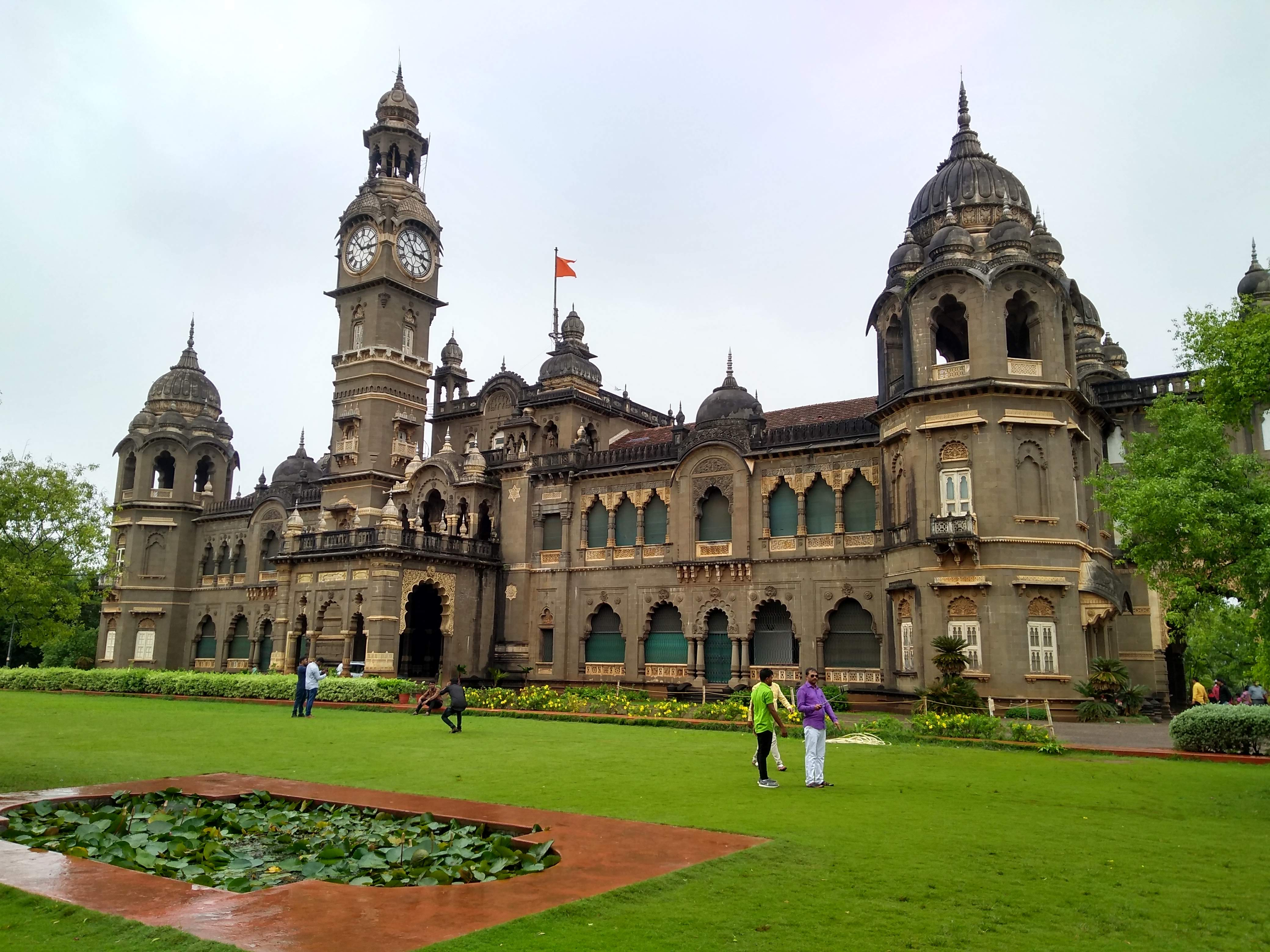
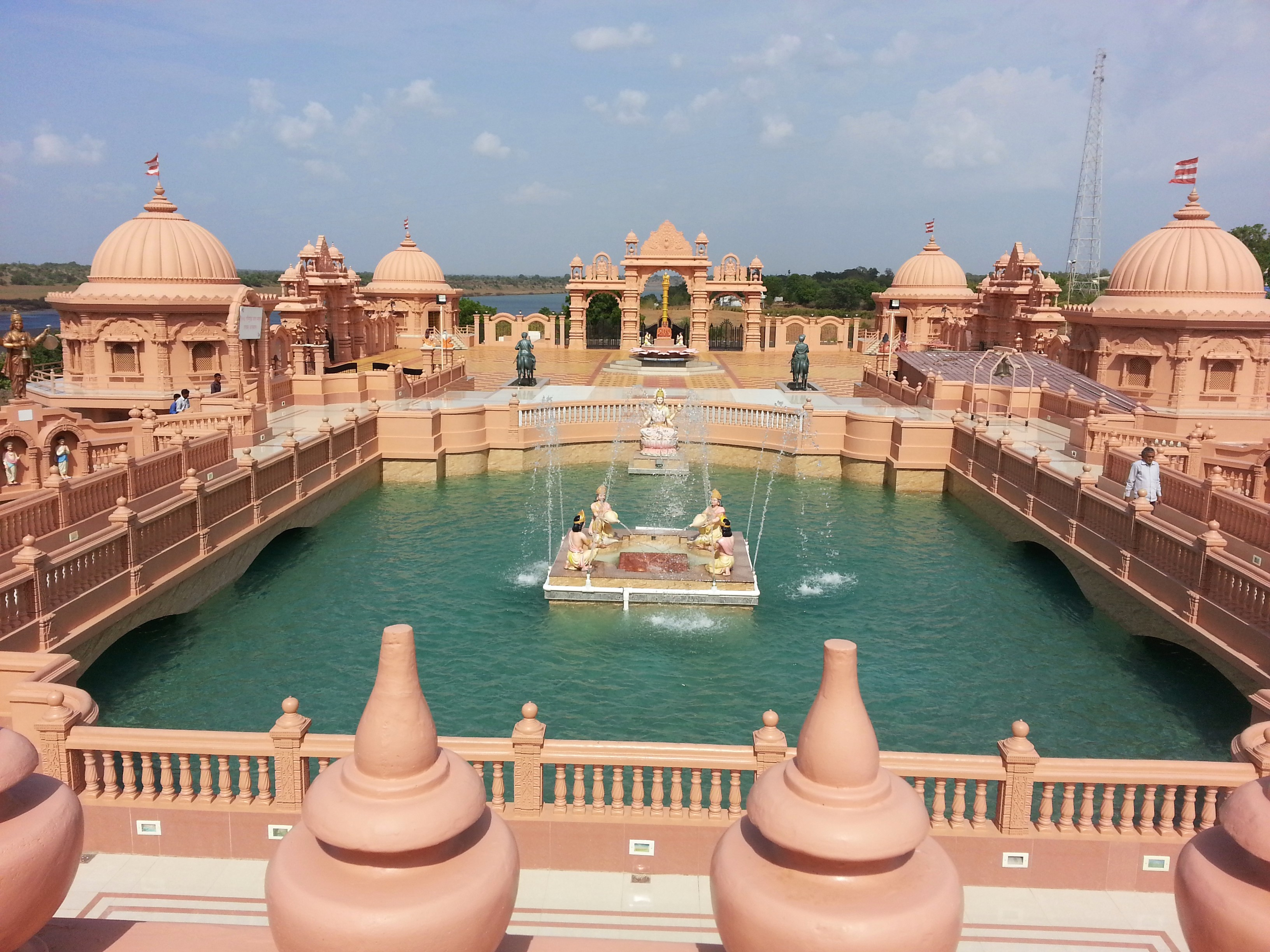
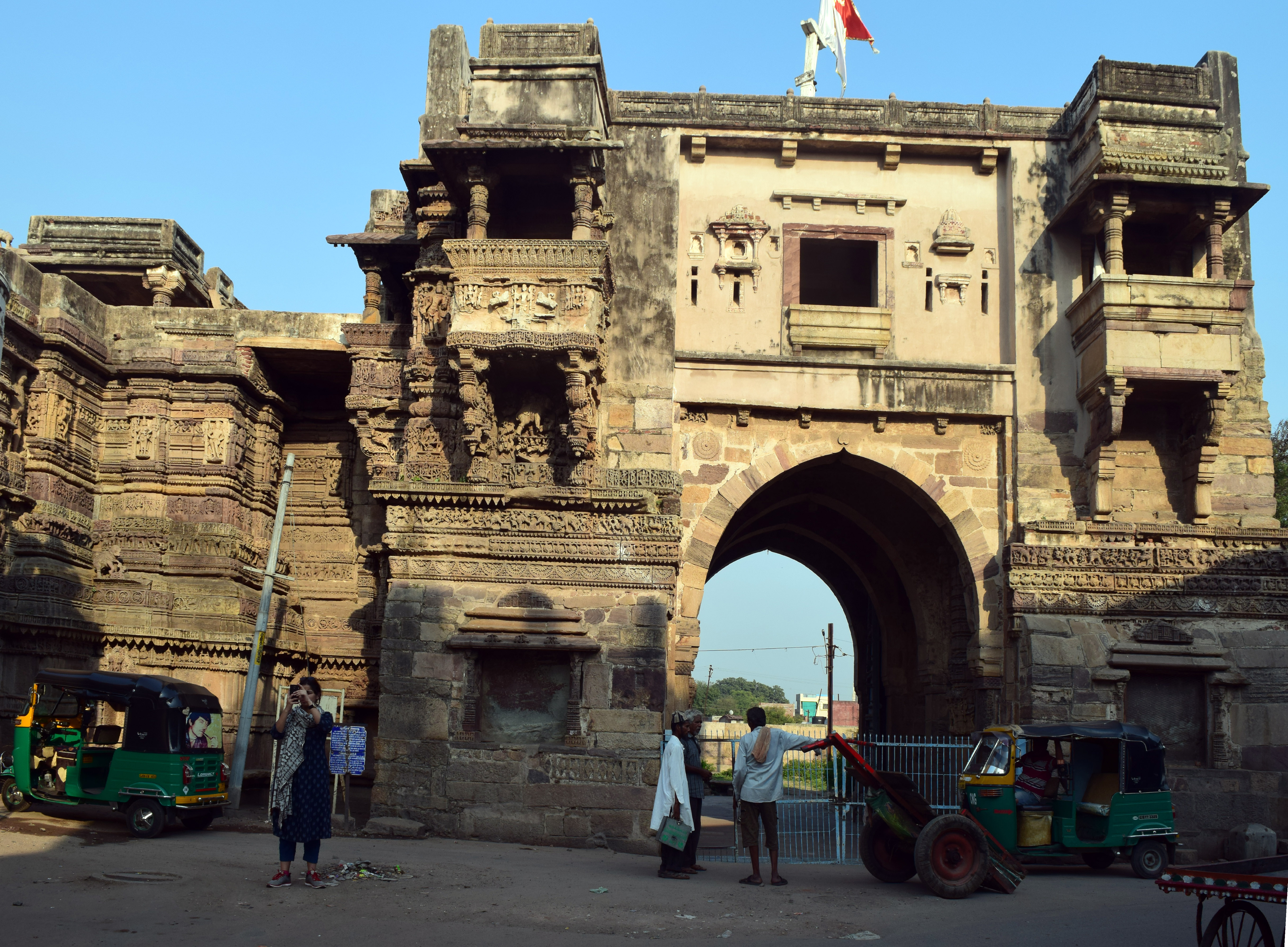
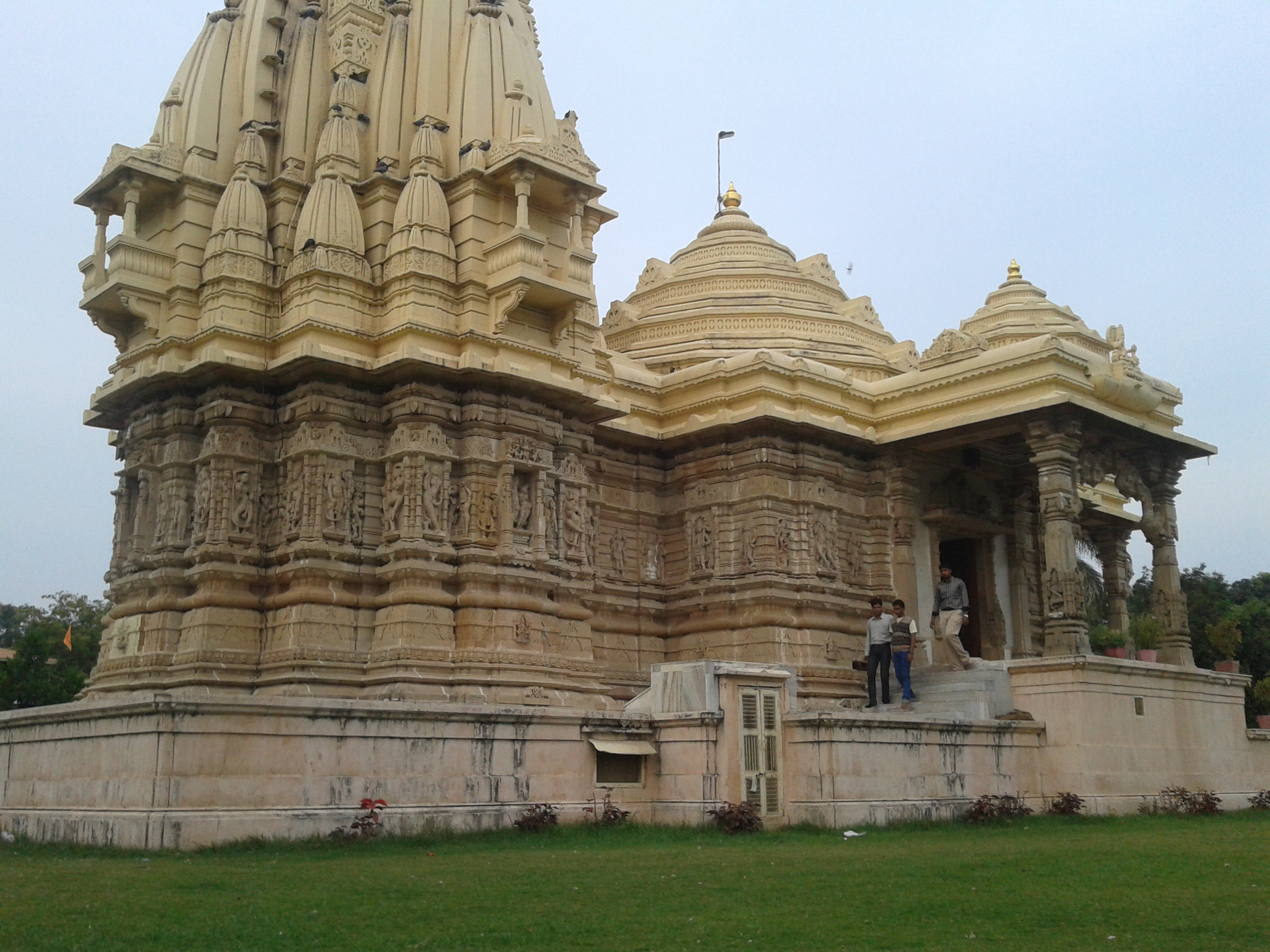
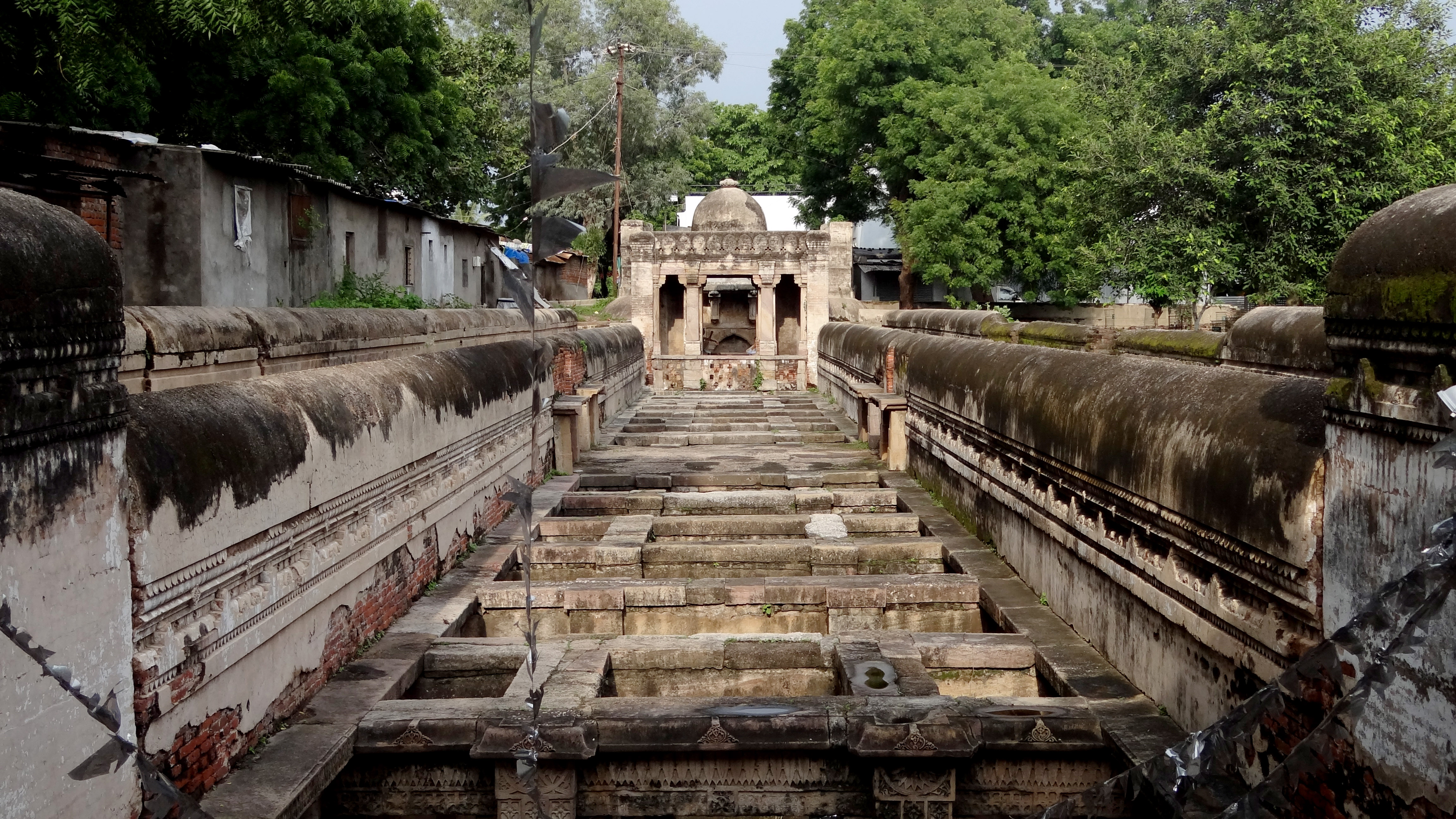
- Lakshmi Vilas Palace, Vadodara, Nilkanthdam, Poicha, Temple in Kayavarohan, Vidyadhar Stepwell, Hira Gate in Dabhoi
- Interactive Map Outlining Vadodara District
- Location in Gujarat
- Coordinates: 22°18′N 73°12′E
- Country: India
- State: Gujarat

Government
  - Collector: Anil Dhameliya, IAS

Area
  - Total: 4,110 km^{2} (1,590 sq mi)

Population (2011)
  - Total: 4,193,795
  - Density: 1,020/km^{2} (2,640/sq mi)
- Demonym(s): Barodian, Badodekar, Barodekar

Languages
  - Official: Gujarati
  - Other: Hindi, English
- Time zone: UTC+5:30 (IST)
- PIN: 390 0XX
- ISO 3166 code: IN-GJ-VD
- Vehicle registration: GJ-06, GJ-29 (Reserved)
- Lok Sabha constituency: 2
- Vidhan Sabha constituency: 12
- Climate: Semi-Arid (BSh) (Köppen)
- Avg. annual temperature: 12–43 °C
- Avg. summer temperature: 26–43 °C
- Avg. winter temperature: 12–33 °C
- Website: vadodara.gujarat.gov.in

Vadodara district, also known as Baroda district, is situated in the eastern part of the state of Gujarat in western India. The administrative headquarters of the district is the city of Vadodara (Baroda). The district covers an area of 7,794 km^{2} and had a population of 4,165,626 as of 2011. Out of this population, 49.6% were urban, 50.4% were rural, 5.3% were Scheduled Castes and 27.6% were Scheduled Tribes. As of 2011, Vadodara district is the third most populous district of Gujarat, out of 34 districts in the state.

== Climate ==
The Vadodara district has a dry climate and three distinct seasons, namely summer, winter and monsoon.

Vadodara

Climate chart (precipitation, max. and min. temperature)
J	F	M	A	M	J	J	A	S	O	N	D
1 29 12	0 32 13	1 36 18	0 39 22	3 40 26	129 36 26	290 32 25	274 31 24	147 32 24	21 35 21	16 33 16	3 30 16
- █ Average max. and min. temperatures in °C
- █ Precipitation totals in mm
- Source: IMD
Imperial conversion
J	F	M	A	M	J	J	A	S	O	N	D
0 84 54	0 90 55	0 97 64	0 102 72	0.1 104 79	5.1 97 79	11 90 77	11 88 75	5.8 90 75	0.8 95 70	0.6 91 61	0.1 86 61
- █ Average max. and min. temperatures in °F
- █ Precipitation totals in inches

== Divisions ==
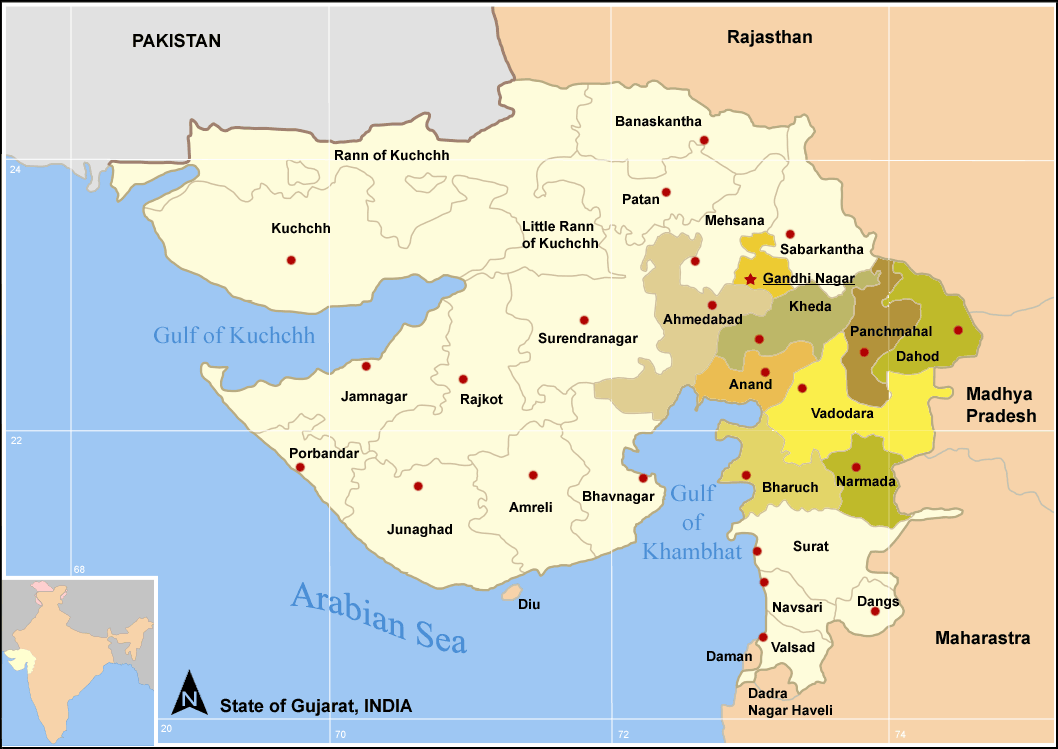
Districts of central Gujarat

Vadodara is divided into 5 Prants and 12 talukas.

#	Prant	Taluka
1	Vadodara-City	Vadodara-East
2	Vadodara-City	Vadodara-West
3	Vadodara-City	Vadodara-North
4	Vadodara-City	Vadodara-South
5	Vadodara-Rural	Vadodara-Rural
6	Vadodara-Rural	Padra
7	Savli	Savli
8	Savli	Desar
9	Karjan	Karjan
10	Karjan	Shinor
11	Dabhoi	Dabhoi
12	Dabhoi	Vaghodiya

== Demographics ==
Historical population
Year	Pop.	±% p.a.
1901	575,650	—
1911	679,540	+1.67%
1921	736,050	+0.80%
1931	856,580	+1.53%
1941	1,019,524	+1.76%
1951	1,181,782	+1.49%
1961	1,490,144	+2.35%
1971	1,936,523	+2.65%
1981	2,509,431	+2.63%
1991	3,038,127	+1.93%
2001	3,641,802	+1.83%
2011	4,165,626	+1.35%

According to the 2011 census Vadodara district has a population of 4,165,626, The district has a population density of 551 inhabitants per square kilometre (1,430/sq mi) . Its population growth rate over the decade 2001–2011 was 14.16%. Vadodara has a sex ratio of 934 females for every 1000 males. It has a literacy rate of 81.21% in 2011, a ten percentage points increase in 10 years.

The divided district has a population of 3,093,795, of which 1,993,356 (64.43%) lived in urban areas. The divided district had a sex ratio of 923 females per 1000 males. Scheduled Castes and Scheduled Tribes make up 196,350 (6.35%) and 293,039 (9.47%) of the population respectively.

=== Religion ===
Religions in Vadodara district (2011)
Religion	Percent
Hinduism	86.59%
Islam	11.12%
Jainism	1.75%
Christianity	0.65%
Other or not stated	0.49%

Hindus were 3,640,856 (86.59%), while Muslims were 450,357 (11.12%), Jains 75,355 (1.75%) and Christians 23,229 (0.60%).

=== Language ===
Languages of Vadodara district (2011)
1. Gujarati (82.0%)
2. Hindi (9.64%)
3. Marathi (4.51%)
4. Sindhi (1.11%)
5. Others (2.77%)

At the time of the 2011 census, 81.97% of the population spoke Gujarati, 9.64% Hindi, 4.51% Marathi and 1.11% Sindhi as their first language.

== Politics ==
District	No.	Constituency	Name	Party	Remarks
Vadodara	135	Savli	Ketan Inamdar		
Vadodara	136	Vaghodiya	Dharmendrasinh Vaghela	Independent	Resigned on 24 January 2024
Vadodara	136	Vaghodiya	Dharmendrasinh Vaghela	Bharatiya Janata Party	Elected on 4 June 2024
Vadodara	140	Dabhoi	Shailesh Sotta		
Vadodara	141	Vadodara City (SC)	Manisha Vakil		
Vadodara	142	Sayajigunj	Keyur Rokadia		
Vadodara	143	Akota	Chaitanya Desai		
Vadodara	144	Raopura	Balkrushna Shukla		
Vadodara	145	Manjalpur	Satish Patel		Elected in by election necessitated after death of Yogesh Patel.
Vadodara	146	Padra	Chaitanyasinh Zala		
Vadodara	147	Karjan	Akshay Patel		

== Ecology ==
The Wadhvana Wetland located near Dabhoi Taluka here is a wetland that was designated as a Ramsar wetland site on 2021.

== Notable personalities ==
- Premanand Bhatt (1649–1714) Author. Born in Vadodara.
- Nayan Mongia – Cricketer
- Jacob Martin – Cricketer
- Irfan Pathan – Cricketer
- Yusuf Pathan – Cricketer
- Hardik Pandya – Cricketer
- Krunal Pandya – Cricketer
- Kiran More – Cricketer
- Anshul Trivedi – Actor
- Dharmesh Yelande – Choreographer and Actor
- Deepak Hooda – Cricketer
- Bhuvan Bam – YouTuber
- Vijay Hazare – Cricketer
- Anshuman Gaekwad – Cricketer
- Shrenu Parikh – Actor
- Manan Desai – comedian
- Chirayu Amin – Business person
- Dilip Sanghvi – Business Person
