= Bhadon, Uttar Pradesh =

Bhadon
- Village
- Location in Uttar Pradesh
- Coordinates: 25.901323°N 82.785234°E
- Country: India
- State: Uttar Pradesh
- District: Azamgarh
- Tehsil: Martinganj

Government
  - Type: Gram Panchayat
  - MLA: Kamlakant Rajbhar (SP)
  - MP: Daroga Saroj (SP)
- Elevation: 87 m (285 ft)

Population (2011)
  - Total: 6,843

Languages
  - Official: Hindi, Urdu, Bhojpuri
- Time zone: UTC+5:30 (IST)
- PIN: 223224
- Area code: 05452
- Vehicle registration: UP 50

Religions in Bhadon
Religion	Percent
Hindus	50%
Buddhism	02%
Muslims	48%

Bhadon is a village and Gram Panchayat located in Martinganj tehsil of the Azamgarh District in the Indian state of Uttar Pradesh, near the border with Jaunpur District. It is 37.7 kilometres (23.4 mi) north-east of the district headquarters in Azamgarh and 229.9 kilometres (142.9 mi) from the state capital of Lucknow.

Bhadon is known for its mangoes, which are exported to many villages. Mihrawan Railway station is the nearest railway station to the village.

== Demographics ==
According to the 2011 census, Bhadon has a total population of 6,843 people (3,447 men and 3,396 women) living in about 882 houses. Most of the population is either Hindu (51%) or Muslim (49%).

In 2011, there were 1,095 children aged 0–6, making up 16% of the total population. The average sex ratio was 985 which is higher than the Uttar Pradesh state average of 912. The child sex ratio for Bhadon as per census is 885, lower than the state average of 902.

Bhadon village has a high literacy rate compared to the rest of Uttar Pradesh. In 2011, the literacy rate of Bhadon was 68.98% compared to 67.68% of Uttar Pradesh. In Bhadon, the male literacy rate was 77.15% while the female literacy rate was 60.86%.

The official languages of Bhadon are Hindi and Urdu, which are spoken by the majority of the population, although Hindi is the most used for everyday communication.

== Geography ==
Bhadon has an average elevation of 87 metres (285 ft) and a total area of 512.04 hectares (1,265.3 acres). The closest town is Jaunpur, approximately 20 km (12 mi) away. The latitude 25.90 N and longitude 82.77 E.

== Festivals and Events ==
Bhadon is famous for Hindu festivals like Navratri, Vijayadashami mela, Ram Leela, Diwali, Raksha Bandhan, Basant Panchami, and Holi. Public processions are organised to celebrate the festivals. The primary Muslim festivals celebrated annually in the village are the ld-ul-fitr' (Ramzan), Bakrid, Mid-Sha'ban, Bara Wafat and Muharram.

== Education ==
There are many schools and Islamic Madrasas in Bhadon. The educational institutions are the main attraction for students from nearby cities such as Martinganj, Jamuhai and Purvanchal. Many of the schools are associated with Veer Bahadur Singh Purvanchal University, Jaunpur.

Education in Bhadon

- Bhadon Primary School
- Islamia Madarsa
- S.Rai Primary School (Mahuja-Newada)
- Martinganj Inter College
- Shramjivi Balika Inter College

== Sports ==
Cricket and Kabaddi is a popular sport in Bhadon.

== Temples ==
Hanuman temple, Ram Janki temple, and Shiv temple are revered.

== Agriculture ==
Agriculture is the main profession. The main crops are rice, maize, pigeon pea, pearl millet, blackgram wheat, onions, potato and chickpeas.

== Administration and politics ==
As per the Constitution of India and Panchyati Raaj Act, Bhadon village is administrated by a Sarpanch (head of the village) who is the elected representative of the village.

In the 2014 general election, Neelam Sonkar of BJP became the Member of Parliament from the Lalganj constituency. In the 2017 Uttar Pradesh Legislative Assembly election, Sukhdev Rajbhar of BSP became the Member of Legislative Assembly from Didarganj (Assembly constituency). SP, BSP, and BJP are the major political parties in this area.

== Communication and media ==
=== Local media ===
Major English, Hindi and Urdu dailies including The Times of India, Hindustan Times, The Hindu, Dainik Jagran, Amar Ujala, Hindustan and Patrika are available in Azamgarh. Almost all big Hindi TV news channels and azamgarh based Azamgarh Express social media channel have stringers in the village.

=== Communication networks ===
All prominent telecommunication network providers in India offer their services in Bhadon.

GSM service providers	CDMA service providers	Broadband service providers
Idea Cellular	Airtel	TATA Communications
Reliance Communications	Tata Indicom	Airtel
Airtel	BSNL WLL	Reliance Communications
Vodafone	Aircel	Vodafone
Aircel	Reliance Communications	BSNL Broadband

=== Radio services ===
All radio services available in Bhadon.

- Voice Of Azamgarh Big FM community radio.
- Air Vivid Bharti 102.2 MHz which broadcasts from Mau District & Covers Azamgarh city too.

== See also ==
- Martinganj
- Phulpur
- Azamgarh
