= Martinganj =

Block Tahsil in Uttar Pradesh, India

- Block Tehsil & Town
- Location in Uttar Pradesh
- Coordinates: 25°54′32″N 82°48′31″E
- Country: India
- State: Uttar Pradesh
- District: Azamgarh
- Tehsil: Martinganj

Government
  - Type: Taluka
  - Body: Nagar Panchayat
  - MLA: kamlakant Rajbhar (SP)
  - MP: Sangeeta Azad (BSP)

Language
  - Official: Hindi
  - Additional official: Urdu
- Time zone: UTC+5:30 (IST)
- PIN: 223224
- Area code: 05452
- Vehicle registration: UP-50

Martinganj is a nagar panchayat located in the Azamgarh District of Uttar Pradesh, India. Lucknow is the state capital, located around 232.5 km (144.5 mi) from Martinganj. The other surrounding state capitals are Patna 234.6 km (145.8 mi), Ranchi 381.1 km (236.8 mi), and Gangtok 598.1 km (371.6 mi).

== History ==
Martinganj was settled during the British Raj. The town was established as a tehsil in 2012 under the Akhilesh Yadav ministry. In October 2020, the Yogi Adityanath ministry proposed to make Martinganj a nagar panchayat.

== Religious festivals ==
Hindu Festival like Navratri, Vijayadashami Mela and Ramlila are celebrated. The primary Muslim festivals celebrated annually in the village are the Id-ul-fitr, Ramadan, Bakrid, Mid-Sha'ban, Barawafat and Muharram.

== Politics ==
In the 2019 general elections Sangeeta Azad of the Bahujan Samaj Party became the Member of Parliament from the Lalganj constituency. In the Uttar Pradesh Legislative Assembly Election of 2017 Sukhdev Rajbhar of the Bahujan Samaj Party became the Member of Legislative Assembly from Didarganj (Assembly constituency). The Samajwadi Party, the Bahujan Samaj Party, and the Bharatiya Janata Party are the major political parties in this area.

== Nearest airport ==
- Azamgarh Airport 40.8 km.
- Lal Bahadur Shastri International Airport (Babatpur) 47.9 km.
- Akbarpur Airport 60.9 km.

== Local media ==
Mostly all major English, Hindi and Urdu daily newspapers, including The Times of India, Hindustan Times, The Hindu, Dainik Jagran, Amar Ujala and Hindustan, are available in Martinganj. Almost all big Hindi TV news channels have stringers in Azamgarh.

== Communication networks ==
All prominent telecommunication network provider in India offer their services in Martinganj.

GSM Service Providers	CDMA Service Providers	Broadband Service Providers
Idea Cellular	Airtel	TATA Communications
Reliance Communications	Tata Indicom	Airtel
Airtel	BSNL WLL	Reliance Communications
Vodafone	Aircel	Vodafone
Aircel	Reliance Communications	BSNL Broadband

== Radio services ==
All radio services available in Martinganj.

- Voice Of Azamgarh 90.4 MHz Community Radio.
- Air Vivid Bharti 102.2 MHz which Broadcast from Mau District & Covers Azamgarh city too.

== See also ==
- Bhadon, Uttar Pradesh
