= Surhan =

- Village
- Location in Azamgarh, Uttar Pradesh, India Surhan (India)
- Coordinates: 26.23°N 82.96°E
- Country: India
- State: Uttar Pradesh
- District: Azamgarh
- Tehsil: Phulpur

Government
  - Type: Gram Panchayat / Nyaya Panchayat
- Elevation: 80 m (260 ft)

Population
  - Total: 6,995

Languages
  - Official: Hindi
- Time zone: UTC+5:30 (IST)
- PIN: 223224
- Vehicle registration: UP- 50
- Sex ratio: 3336/3659♂/♀
- Lok Sabha constituency: Lalganj
- Vidhan Sabha constituency: Didarganj
- Distance from Martinganj: 1 kilometre (0.62 mi)
- Distance from Jaunpur District: 34 kilometres (21 mi)

Surhan is a village in Martinganj Block in Azamgarh district of Uttar Pradesh State, India. It belongs to Azamgarh Division . It is located 44 km west of the District headquarters Azamgarh. 1 km from Martinganj. 249 km from State capital Lucknow.

== Transportation ==
Nearest Bus service available in less than 5 km. There is no Railway Station in less than 10 km. Autos Available in this Village. Tractors Available in this Village. Man pulled Cycle Rickshaws Available in this Village. Animal Driven Carts are there in this Village.

No Nearest National Highway in less than 10 km. No Nearest State Highway in less than 10 km. Nearest airport to Surhan.

== Nearest airport ==
- Azamgarh Airport 40.8 km.
- Lal Bahadur Shastri International Airport (Babatpur) 47.9 km.
- Akbarpur Airport 60.9 km.

== Surhan population ==
Surhan is a large village located in Martinganj Tehsil of Azamgarh district, Uttar Pradesh with total 1010 families residing. The Surhan village has population of 6995 of which 3336 are males while 3659 are females as per Population Census 2011.

In Surhan village population of children with age 0–6 is 1158 which makes up 16.55% of total population of village. Average Sex Ratio of Surhan village is 1097 which is higher than Uttar Pradesh state average of 912. Child Sex Ratio for the Surhan as per census is 859, lower than Uttar Pradesh average of 902.

Surhan village has higher literacy rate compared to Uttar Pradesh. In 2011, literacy rate of Surhan village was 69.08% compared to 67.68% of Uttar Pradesh. In Surhan Male literacy stands at 80.76% while female literacy rate was 58.93%.

As per constitution of India and Panchyati Raaj Act, Surhan village is administrated by Sarpanch (Head of Village) who is elected representative of village.
