= Babubhai Patel ministry =

Government of Gujarat, India (1977–1980)

Second Babubhai Patel ministry
- Ministry of Gujarat
- Date formed: 11 April 1977
- Date dissolved: 17 February 1980

People and organisations
- Chief Minister: Babubhai J. Patel
- Member party: Janata Party

History
- Predecessor: First Madhav Singh Solanki ministry
- Successor: President's rule

Babubhai J. Patel became Chief Minister of Gujarat twice. In 1974 Chimanbhai Patel resigned from the post of Chief Minister due to Nav Nirman movement and the assembly was dissolved. On subsequent election to the assembly Babubhai Patel became the Chief Minister of the first non-Congress government of Gujarat on 18 June 1975. He led the coalition of parties known as Janata Morcha. After a week, emergency was imposed by Indira Gandhi and he had to resign in March 1976. He again became Chief Minister in 1977 as a leader of Janata Party and remained until 1980 when his government was dismissed. Here is the list of ministers of his second ministry (1977–1980)

== Council of Ministers ==
No.	Name	Office	Portfolio	Took Office	Left Office
1	Babubhai J. Patel	Chief Minister		11 April 1977	17 February 1980
2	Keshubhai Patel	Cabinet Minister	Irrigation	11 April 1977	17 February 1980
3	Shankarsinh Vaghela	Cabinet Minister		11 April 1977	17 February 1980
4	Harisinh Chavda	Cabinet Minister	Prohibition	11 April 1977	17 February 1980
5	Bhanjibhai Patel	Cabinet Minister		11 April 1977	17 February 1980
6	Bhimabhai Rathod	Cabinet Minister		11 April 1977	17 February 1980
7	Maneklal Gandhi	Cabinet Minister	Education	11 April 1977	17 February 1980
8	Bhailalbhai Contractor	Cabinet Minister		11 April 1977	17 February 1980
9	Rasikchandra Acharya	Cabinet Minister		11 April 1977	17 February 1980
10	Navin Chandra Barot	Cabinet Minister	labour	11 April 1977	17 February 1980
11	Poptalal Vyas	Cabinet Minister		11 April 1977	17 February 1980
12	Hemaben Acharya	Cabinet Minister	Health	11 April 1977	17 February 1980
13	Chandubhai Deshmukh	Cabinet Minister	Forests, Tribal Welfare and Rural Housing	11 April 1977	17 February 1980
14	Lallubhai Sheth	Cabinet Minister		11 April 1977	17 February 1980
15	Motibhai Chaudhary	Cabinet Minister	Transport	11 April 1977	17 February 1980
16	Navalbhai Shah	Cabinet Minister		11 April 1977	17 February 1980
17	Makrandbhai Desai	Cabinet Minister	Industries	11 April 1977	17 February 1980
18	Dineshbhai Shah	Cabinet Minister		11 April 1977	17 February 1980
19	Kokilaben Vyas	Minister of State		11 April 1977	17 February 1980
20	Mohmed Surti	Minister of State		11 April 1977	17 February 1980
21	Bhavsinh Jhala	Minister of State		11 April 1977	17 February 1980
22	Dr Devjibhai Vanvi	Minister of State		11 April 1977	17 February 1980
23	Harihar Khambholja	Minister of State		11 April 1977	17 February 1980
24	Maganbhai Solanki	Minister of State		11 April 1977	17 February 1980
25	Kiratsinh Gohil	Deputy Minister		11 April 1977	17 February 1980
26	Balvantrai Manvar	Deputy Minister		11 April 1977	17 February 1980
27	Purushottam Makwana	Deputy Minister		11 April 1977	17 February 1980
28	Khimji Jesang	Deputy Minister		11 April 1977	17 February 1980
29	Lalit Patel	Deputy Minister		11 April 1977	17 February 1980
