= Azad Ari Mardan =

Indian politician (born 1972)

Member of Legislative Assembly of Lalganj
- In office 11 March 2017 – 10 March 2022
- Preceded by: Bechai Saroj
- Succeeded by: Bechai Saroj
- Constituency: Lalganj, Azamgarh

Personal details
- Born: 1 July 1972 (age 54) Azamgarh, Uttar Pradesh, India
- Party: Bharatiya Janta Party
- Spouse: Sangeeta Azad
- Children: 3
- Parent: Gandhi Azad
- Education: Bachelor of Arts; Bachelor of Laws
- Alma mater: University of Allahabad
- Occupation: MLA
- Profession: Politician; Agriculture; Advocacy

Azad Ari Mardan is an Indian politician and a former member of 17th Legislative Assembly of Uttar Pradesh of India. He represented the Lalganj constituency of Uttar Pradesh and was a member of the Bahujan Samaj Party. Currently, Azad is the member of Bharatiya Janta Party (BJP).

== Early life and education ==
Mardan was born 1 July 1972 in Azamgarh, Uttar Pradesh, to his father Gandhi Azad. He belongs to the Chamar community, a Scheduled Caste. He got a B.A. degree in 1992 and a LLB in 1995 from Allahabad University. He married Sangeeta Azad; they have one son and two daughters.

== Political career ==
Mardan has been a member of the 17th Legislative Assembly of Uttar Pradesh. Since 2017, he has represented the Lalganj constituency and is a member of the Bahujan Samaj Party. He defeated Bharatiya Janata Party candidate Daroga Prasad Saroj by a margin of 2,227 votes.

His wife Sangeeta Azad was also elected Member of Parliament from Lalganj Loksabha in 2019 general elections by defeating BJP's Neelam Sonkar.

== Posts held ==
#	From	To	Position	Comments
01	March 2017	March 2022	Member, 17th Legislative Assembly of Uttar Pradesh	
