= Kurthuwa =

Kurthuwa, Azamgarh
- Village
- Location in Uttar Pradesh, India
- Coordinates: 25°51′06.7″N 82°47′10.7″E
- Country: India
- State: Uttar Pradesh
- District: Azamgarh
- Lok Sabha Member of Parliament: Neelam Sonkar, 2014 Bharatiya Janata Party
- Former seat: Bali Ram, 2009 Bahujan Samaj Party

Government
  - Type: Gram panchayat

Area
  - Total: 241.01 km^{2} (93.05 sq mi)
- Elevation: 87 m (285 ft)

Population (2011)
  - Total: 1,850
  - Density: 7.68/km^{2} (19.9/sq mi)

Languages
  - Official Language: Hindi, Bhojpuri
  - Population of Male: 881
  - Population of Female: 969

Population
- Time zone: UTC+5:30 (IST)
- 27630X: 276301
- 2011 Census of India code: 195140

Kurthuwa is a village panchayat located in the Azamgarh district of Uttar-Pradesh state, India. The Tehsil for this panchayat is Phulpur. Lucknow is the state capital for Kurthuwa village. It is located around 233.2 kilometer away from Kurthuwa.

The other nearest state capital from Kurthuwa is Patna and its distance is 127.1 km. The other surrounding state capitals are Patna 234.9 km., Ranchi 378.3 km., Gangtok 600.3 km.

Kurthuwa is surrounded by Mirzapur Tehsil towards East, Dharma Pur Tehsil towards South, Thekma Tehsil towards East, Karanja Kala Tehsil towards west.

== Language of Kurthuwa ==
The native language of Village Kurthuwa is Hindi, Urdu, Bhojpuri and most of the people are able to speak and understand Hindi, Urdu. Kurthuwa people use Hindi/Bhojpuri language for general communication.

== Nearest Railway station ==
Station Name	Distance
Mihrawan railway station	10.7 km
Kheta Sarai railway station	16.1 km
Muftiganj railway station	18.2 km
Zafarabad Jn railway station	19.5 km
Jaunpur City railway station	20.0 km

== Nearest Airport ==
Azamgarh Airport	45.0 km.
Lal Bahadur Shastri Airport	46.5 km

== Nearby villages ==
Nearby Villages of Kurthuwa

- Sonhara
- Ajaur
- Kamalpur
- Barra
- Chiksanwa
- Chaktek Chand
- Chak Patti
- Bairi
- Barauna
- Adhawal
- Lalan Garha

== Caste and People ==
Kurthuwa village of Azamgarh has substantial population of Schedule Caste. Schedule Caste (SC) constitutes 34.05% of total population in Kurthuwa village. The village Kurthuwa currently doesn't have any Schedule Tribe (ST) population.
