= Syndicate Congress =

Defunct Indian political party

Indian National Congress (O)
- Abbreviation: INC(O)
- Leader: Leaders: K. Kamaraj; Morarji Desai; S. Nijalingappa; C. M. Poonacha; Neelam Sanjiva Reddy; Atulya Ghosh; S. K. Patil; Hitendra Kanaiyalal Desai; Satyendra Narayan Sinha; Chandra Bhanu Gupta; Veerendra Patil; Ashoka Mehta; Tribhuvan Narain Singh; Ram Subhag Singh; B. D. Sharma
- Founded: 1969
- Dissolved: 1977
- Split from: Indian National Congress
- Merged into: Janata Party
- Ideology: Conservatism; Anti-socialism; Pro-Western sentiment
- Political position: Centre-right to right-wing
- National affiliation: Grand Alliance (1971); Janata Morcha (1974–1977)
- Colours: Turquoise

Election symbol
- Charkha being piled by a woman

The Indian National Congress (Organisation) also known as Congress (O) or Syndicate/Old Congress was the rightist faction of Indian National Congress formed when the party split following the expulsion of Indira Gandhi. It was registered as a political party in 1969. Following the 1969 split, Congress (O) was one of the two rival camps claiming to represent the Indian National Congress. The rival Congress (R) camp was subsequently recognised as the Indian National Congress, leaving Congress (O) to continue as a separate political party before later merging with other opposition parties to form the Janata Party.

On 12 November 1969, amid an escalating power struggle between Prime Minister Indira Gandhi and the party’s old guard, commonly known as the Syndicate, the leadership led by other factions expelled her on charges of indiscipline. The decision was opposed by a majority of All India Congress Committee members, with 446 of its 705 members supporting Gandhi's camp. The dispute subsequently split the Congress into two rival factions, the Gandhi-led Congress (R) or Indicate and the organisation-led Congress (O), both of which claimed to represent the Indian National Congress. In the All India Congress Committee, 446 of its 705 members walked over to Indira's Congress (R). K. Kamaraj and later Morarji Desai were the leaders of the Congress (O).

Congress (O) led governments in Bihar under Bhola Paswan Shastri, Karnataka under Veerendra Patil, and in Gujarat under Hitendra K Desai. It was also a part of the Janata Morcha that ruled Gujarat under Babubhai J. Patel from 1975–1976 during the emergency era.

The split can in some ways be seen as a left-wing/right-wing division. Indira wanted to use a populist agenda in order to mobilise popular support for the party. The regional party elites, who formed the Congress (O), stood for a more right-wing agenda, and distrusted Soviet help.

In the 1971 general election, the Congress (O) won about 10% of the vote and 16 Lok Sabha seats, against 44% of the vote and 352 seats for Indira's Congress (R). In March 1977, the Congress (O) fought the post-Emergency election under the banner of Janata Party.

The Janata Party Alliance inflicted a crushing defeat on Indira's Congress (R). Nevertheless, the total vote share of Congress (O) in 1977 was almost halved from 1971 and they lost thirteen seats. Later the same year, Congress (O) formally merged with the Bharatiya Lok Dal, Bharatiya Jan Sangh, Socialist Party of India, Swatantra Party and others to form the Janata Party.

Congress (O)'s leader Morarji Desai served as the fourth Prime Minister of India from 1977 to 1979 in India's first non-Congress government. However, internal divisions within the Janata Party led to the collapse of the government in 1979. Morarji Desai resigned and Charan Singh became Prime Minister on 28 July 1979 with outside support from Indira's Congress (I), which had emerged from the Congress (R) faction. Congress (I) subsequently withdrew its support before Charan Singh could prove his majority in the Lok Sabha, and he resigned in January 1980. Fresh elections were held in January 1980, in which Congress (I) won a decisive victory and returned to power.

== Leaders ==
- Morarji Desai
- S. K. Patil
- Neelam Sanjiva Reddy
- S. Nijalingappa
- K. Kamaraj
- Hitendra K Desai
- Veerendra Patil
- C. M. Poonacha
- Atulya Ghosh
- Satyendra Narayan Sinha
- Chandra Bhanu Gupta
- P. M. Nadagouda
- Ashoka Mehta
- Tribhuvan Narain Singh
- Ram Subhag Singh
- B. D. Sharma

== See also ==
- Politics of India
- Elections in India
- List of political parties in India
- Indian National Congress breakaway parties
