= Ram Badan =

Indian politician

Member of Parliament, Lok Sabha
- In office 1991-1996
- Preceded by: Ram Dhan
- Succeeded by: Bali Ram
- Constituency: Lalganj, Uttar Pradesh

Personal details
- Born: 1 January 1943 (age 83) Mau, Faridpur District, United Provinces, British India (present-day Uttar Pradesh, India)
- Party: Janata Dal
- Spouse: Shyam Kumari Devi

Ram Badan was an Indian politician. He was elected to the Lok Sabha, the lower house of the Parliament of India from the Lalganj constituency of Uttar Pradesh as a member of the Janata Dal.
