= Lalganj, Uttar Pradesh Assembly constituency =

Assembly constituency in Uttar Pradesh

Coordinates: 26.17°N 80.96°E

Lalganj
- Constituency No. 351 for the Uttar Pradesh Legislative Assembly

Constituency details
- Country: India
- Region: North India
- State: Uttar Pradesh
- District: Azamgarh
- Reservation: SC

Member of Legislative Assembly
- 18th Uttar Pradesh Legislative Assembly
- Incumbent Bechai Saroj
- Party: Samajwadi Party
- Elected year: 2022

Lalganj is a constituency of the Uttar Pradesh Legislative Assembly covering the city of Lalganj in the Azamgarh district of Uttar Pradesh, India.

Lalganj is one of five assembly constituencies in the Lalganj Lok Sabha constituency. Since 2008, this assembly constituency is numbered 351 amongst 403 constituencies.

== Members of the Legislative Assembly ==
Bahujan Samaj Party and Indian National Congress are the most successful political parties in Lalganj Assembly elections.
1. BSP (5 terms) (27.8%)
2. INC (5 terms) (27.8%)
3. JP (2 terms) (11.1%)
4. SP (2 terms) (11.1%)
5. INC (I) (1 term) (5.56%)
6. JD (1 term) (5.56%)
7. Independent (1 term) (5.56%)
8. BJP (1 term) (5.56%)

| Year | Member | Party |
|---|---|---|
| 1957 | Indra Bhushan | Independent |
| 1962 | Indra Bhushan | Indian National Congress |
| 1967 | Triveni | Indian National Congress |
| 1969 | Triveni | Indian National Congress |
| 1974 | Triveni | Indian National Congress |
| 1977 | Ish Dutt | Janata Party |
| 1980 | Triveni | Indian National Congress (Indira) |
| 1982 (By-election) | Ravindra | Indian National Congress |
| 1985 | Shree Prakash | Janata Party |
| 1989 | Shree Prakash | Janata Dal |
| 1991 | Sukhdev Rajbhar | Bahujan Samaj Party |
| 1993 | Sukhdev Rajbhar | Bahujan Samaj Party |
| 1996 | Narendra Singh | Bharatiya Janata Party |
| 2002 | Sukhdev Rajbhar | Bahujan Samaj Party |
| 2007 | Sukhdev Rajbhar | Bahujan Samaj Party |
| 2012 | Bechai | Samajwadi Party |
| 2017 | Azad Ari Mardan | Bahujan Samaj Party |
| 2022 | Bechai Saroj | Samajwadi Party |

== Election results ==
=== 2027 ===
2027 Uttar Pradesh Legislative Assembly election: Lalganj
| Party | Candidate | Votes | % | ±% |
|---|---|---|---|---|
| INDIA | | | | |
| NDA | | | | |
| BSP | | | | |
| NOTA | None of the above | | | |
| Majority | | | | |
| Turnout | | | | |
| gain from | | Swing | | |

=== 2022 ===
2022 Uttar Pradesh Legislative Assembly election: Lalganj
| Party | Candidate | Votes | % | ±% |
|---|---|---|---|---|
| SP | Bechai Saroj | 83,767 | 38.31 | +11.7 |
| BJP | Neelam Sonkar | 69,034 | 31.57 | −3.04 |
| BSP | Hariram | 57,809 | 26.44 | −9.27 |
| INC | Pushpa Bhartiya | 2,099 | 0.96 | |
| NOTA | None of the above | 1,743 | 0.8 | −0.25 |
| Majority | | 14,733 | 6.74 | +5.64 |
| Turnout | | 218,657 | 53.65 | +0.55 |
| SP gain from BSP | | Swing | | |

=== 2017 ===
Bahujan Samaj Party candidate Azad Ari Mardan won in last Assembly election of 2017 Uttar Pradesh Legislative Elections defeating Bharatiya Janta Party candidate Daroga Prasad Saroj by a margin of 2,227 votes.

2017 Uttar Pradesh Legislative Assembly Election: Lalgan
| Party | Candidate | Votes | % | ±% |
|---|---|---|---|---|
| BSP | Azad Ari Mardan | 72,715 | 35.71 | |
| BJP | Daroga Prasad Saroj | 70,488 | 34.61 | |
| SP | Bechai Saroj | 54,196 | 26.61 | |
| NOTA | None of the above | 2,123 | 1.05 | |
| Majority | | 2,227 | 1.1 | |
| Turnout | | 203,646 | 53.1 | |

== Members of the Legislative Assembly ==
| # | Term | Member of Legislative Assembly | Party | From | To | Days | Comment |
|---|---|---|---|---|---|---|---|
| 01 | 2nd Vidhan Sabha | Indra Bhushan | Independent | April 1957 | March 1962 | 1,800 | two seat |
| 02 | 2nd Vidhan Sabha | Dhani Ram | Indian National Congress | April 1957 | March 1962 | 1,800 | two seat |
| 03 | 4th Vidhan Sabha | Triveni | Indian National Congress | March 1967 | April 1968 | 402 | |
| 04 | 5th Vidhan Sabha | Triveni | Indian National Congress | February 1969 | March 1974 | 1,832 | |
| 05 | 6th Vidhan Sabha | Triveni | Indian National Congress | March 1974 | April 1977 | 1,153 | |
| 06 | 7th Vidhan Sabha | Ish Dutt | Janata Party | June 1977 | February 1980 | 969 | |
| 07 | 8th Vidhan Sabha | Triveni | Indian National Congress (Indira) | June 1980 | March 1985 | 1,735 | |
| 08 | 8th Vidhan Sabha | Ravindra | Indian National Congress | June 1980 | March 1985 | 1,735 | By Poll in 1982 |
| 09 | 9th Vidhan Sabha | Shree Prakash | Janata Party | March 1985 | November 1989 | 1,725 | |
| 10 | 10th Vidhan Sabha | Shree Prakash | Janata Dal | December 1989 | April 1991 | 488 | |
| 11 | 11th Vidhan Sabha | Sukhdev Rajbhar | Bahujan Samaj Party | June 1991 | December 1992 | 533 | |
| 12 | 12th Vidhan Sabha | Sukhdev Rajbhar | Bahujan Samaj Party | December 1993 | October 1995 | 693 | |
| 13 | 13th Vidhan Sabha | Narendra Singh | Bhartiya Janata Party | October 1996 | March 2002 | 1,967 | |
| 14 | 14th Vidhan Sabha | Sukhdev Rajbhar | Bahujan Samaj Party | February 2002 | May 2007 | 1,902 | |
| 15 | 15th Vidhan Sabha | Sukhdev Rajbhar | Bahujan Samaj Party | May 2007 | March 2012 | 1,736 | |
| 16 | 16th Vidhan Sabha | Bechai | Samajwadi Party | March 2012 | March 2017 | 1,829 | |
| 17 | 17th Vidhan Sabha | Azad Ari Mardan | Bahujan Samaj Party | March 2017 | March 2022 | 3476 | |
