= Gandhi Azad =

Indian politician

Member of Parliament, Rajya Sabha
- In office 2002–2008
- Constituency: Uttar Pradesh
- In office 1996–2002
- Constituency: Uttar Pradesh

Personal details
- Born: 1 July 1946 (age 80)
- Party: Bahujan Samaj Party
- Children: Azad Ari Mardan
- Relatives: Sangeeta Azad (daughter-in-law)
- Occupation: Politician

Gandhi Azad a senior politician from Bahujan Samaj Party was a Member of the Parliament of India representing Uttar Pradesh in the Rajya Sabha the upper house of the Indian Parliament twice from 1996 to 2002, 2002–2008.
