= First Madhav Singh Solanki ministry =

Government of Gujarat, India (1976–1977)

- Ministry of Gujarat
- Date formed: 24 December 1976
- Date dissolved: 10 April 1977

People and organisations
- Chief Minister: Madhav Singh Solanki
- Member party: Indian National Congress

History
- Predecessor: President's rule
- Successor: Second Babubhai Patel ministry

The First Madhav Singh Solanki ministry was the Council of Ministers of Gujarat headed by Madhav Singh Solanki, who served as the 7th Chief Minister of Gujarat from 24 December 1976 to 10 April 1977. He was preceded by President's rule and succeeded by Babubhai J. Patel.

Solanki later served again as Chief Minister from 7 June 1980 to 6 July 1985, and from 10 December 1989 to 4 March 1990.

== Council of Ministers ==
No.	Name	Office	Portfolio	Took Office	Left Office	Party
1	Madhav Singh Solanki	Chief Minister		24 December 1976	10 April 1977	INC
