= Ram Dhan =

Indian politician (1921–2001)

Member of Parliament, Lok Sabha
- In office 1984–1991
- Preceded by: Chhangur Ram
- Succeeded by: Ram Badan
- Constituency: Lalganj
- In office 1967–1979
- Preceded by: Vishram Prasad
- Succeeded by: Chhangur Ram
- Constituency: Lalganj

Personal details
- Born: 1 July 1921 Azampur, Azamgarh, United Provinces, British India (now in Uttar Pradesh, India)
- Died: 23 May 2001 (aged 79) New Delhi, India
- Party: Janata Dal
- Other political affiliations: Janata Party; Indian National Congress
- Spouse: Chandrawati Devi

Ram Dhan (1 July 1921 – 23 May 2001) was an Indian politician and freedom fighter. He represented Lalganj in Lok Sabha a number of times. Ram Dhan was arrested on the night when Emergency was declared by Indira Gandhi.

== Early life ==
Ram Dhan was born on 1 July 1921 in a Raidas family of Chamar at Azampur in Azamgarh district of Uttar Pradesh. He attended Central Hindu College (now Banaras Hindu University) and was awarded Bachelor of Law degree at Law College, BHU. He joined the Socialist movement and grew close to leaders like Jayaprakash Narayan and Acharya Narendra Dev. But later he joined Congress.

In 1963, he married Chandrawati Devi. The couple had two son and two daughters. He also served as a correspondent of Aaj and Sansar of Varanasi, Swatantra Bharat of Lucknow and Amrit Bazar Patrika of Allahabad.

== Political career ==
Before 1947, he took part in many freedom struggles. He was detained under Defence of India Rules for 2 years for taking part in the Quit India Movement in 1942. He joined the Socialist movement but in 1960 he joined Congress party. He was member of 4th, 5th Lok Sabha, representing Lalganj on Congress ticket. He was arrested under Maintenance of Internal Security Act (MISA) during Emergency. He was among the few in Congress who were arrested along with Chandra Shekhar, Mohan Dharia and Krishan Kant.

In 1977, he was elected as Lok Sabha MP on Janata Party ticket from Lalganj Lok Sabha constituency. He was also made General Secretary of Janata Party, but when Morarji Desai was declared as Prime Minister instead of Jagjivan Ram, he resigned in protest. Later he joined Congress but along with VP Singh he resigned from Congress and formed Janata Dal.

== Positions held ==
- 1945–1948 President of District Depressed Class League, Azamgarh.
- 1967–1970 Member, 4th Lok Sabha.
- 1967–1970 Member of Informal Consultative Committee of Shipping and Transport of Parliament.
- 1971–1977 Member, 5th Lok Sabha (2nd term).
- 1977–1979 Member, 6th Lok Sabha (3rd term).
- 1977–1978 President of Bharatiya Depressed Classes League.
- 1977 Selected as General Secretary of Janata Party.
- 1977–1979 Chairman of Committee on the Welfare of Scheduled Castes and Scheduled Tribes of Parliament.
- 1984–1989 Member, 8th Lok Sabha (4th term).
- 1984–1989 Member of Railway Convention Committee of Parliament.
- 1989–1991 Member, 9th Lok Sabha (5th term).
- 1990 Member of Consultative Committee, Ministry of Home Affairs.
- 1990–1995 Chairman of the National Commission for Scheduled Castes and Scheduled Tribes.
