= Lalganj Lok Sabha constituency =

Constituency of the Indian parliament in Uttar Pradesh

Coordinates: 26.16°N 80.97°E

Lalganj UP-68
- Lok Sabha constituency
- Interactive Map Outlining Lalganj Lok Sabha constituency

Constituency details
- Country: India
- Region: North India
- State: Uttar Pradesh
- Assembly constituencies: Atrauliya; Nizamabad; Phoolpur Pawai; Didarganj; Lalganj
- Established: 1962
- Reservation: SC

Member of Parliament
- 18th Lok Sabha
- Incumbent Daroga Saroj
- Party: Samajwadi Party
- Elected year: 2024

Lalganj Lok Sabha constituency is one of the 80 Lok Sabha (parliamentary) constituencies in Uttar Pradesh state in northern India.

== Assembly segments ==
Presently, Lalganj Lok Sabha constituency comprises five Vidhan Sabha (legislative assembly) segments. These are:

No	Name	District	Member	Party	2024 Lead
343	Atraulia	Azamgarh	Sangram Yadav	SP	SP
348	Nizamabad	Azamgarh	Alambadi	SP	SP
349	Phoolpur Pawai	Azamgarh	Ramakant Yadav	SP	SP
350	Didarganj	Azamgarh	Kamalakant Rajbhar	SP	SP
351	Lalganj (SC)	Azamgarh	Bechai Saroj	SP	SP

== Members of Parliament ==
Year	Member	Party
1962	Vishram Prasad	Praja Socialist Party
1967	Ram Dhan	Indian National Congress
1971	Ram Dhan	Indian National Congress
1977	Ram Dhan	Janata Party
1980	Chhangur Ram	Janata Party (Secular)
1984	Ram Dhan	Indian National Congress
1989	Ram Dhan	Janata Dal
1991	Ram Badan	Janata Dal
1996	Bali Ram	Bahujan Samaj Party
1998	Daroga Prasad Saroj	Samajwadi Party
1999	Bali Ram	Bahujan Samaj Party
2004	Daroga Prasad Saroj	Samajwadi Party
2009	Bali Ram	Bahujan Samaj Party
2014	Neelam Sonkar	Bharatiya Janata Party
2019	Sangeeta Azad	Bahujan Samaj Party
2024	Daroga Saroj	Samajwadi Party

== Election results ==
Bahujan Samaj Party is the most successful political party in Lalganj (Lok Sabha constituency).
1. BSP (4 terms) (25.0%)
2. SP (3 terms) (18.8%)
3. INC (3 terms) (18.8%)
4. JD (2 terms) (12.5%)
5. PSP (1 term) (6.25%)
6. Janata Party (1 term) (6.25%)
7. JPS (1 term) (6.25%)
8. BJP (1 term) (6.25%)

=== 2024 ===
2024 Indian general elections: Lalganj
Party	Candidate	Votes	%	±%
SP	Daroga Saroj	439,959	43.85	new
BJP	Neelam Sonkar	3,24,936	32.38	▼4.81
BSP	Prof. Indu Chaudhary	2,10,053	20.93	▼33.08
NOTA	None of the Above	7,094	0.71	N/A
Majority		1,15,023	11.46	▼5.36
Turnout		10,03,438	54.57	▼0.29
SP gain from BSP		Swing		

=== 2019 ===
2019 Indian general elections: Lalganj
Party	Candidate	Votes	%	±%
BSP	Sangeeta Azad	518,820	54.01	
BJP	Neelam Sonkar	3,57,223	37.19	
SBSP	Dr. Deelip Kumar Saroj	17,927	1.87	
INC	Pankaj Mohan Sonkar	17,630	1.84	
Majority		1,61,597	16.82	
Turnout		9,61,064	54.86	
BSP gain from BJP		Swing		

=== 2014 ===
2014 Indian general elections: Lalganj
Party	Candidate	Votes	%	±%
BJP	Neelam Sonkar	324,016	36.02	+10.50
SP	Bechai Saroj	2,60,930	29.01	+6.66
BSP	Dr. Baliram	2,33,971	26.01	−5.58
INC	Balihari Babu	21,832	2.43	+2.43
RUC	Pradeep Kumar	14,368	1.60	+1.60
CPI	Hariprasad Sonkar	10,523	1.17	−0.80
NOTA	None of the Above	7,713	0.86	+0.86
Majority		63,086	7.01	+0.94
Turnout		8,99,548	54.14	+10.52
BJP gain from BSP		Swing	+4.43	

== See also ==
- Azamgarh district
- List of constituencies of the Lok Sabha
