= Bechai Saroj =

Member of the Uttar Pradesh Legislative Assembly

Member of Uttar Pradesh Legislative Assembly
- Incumbent
- Assumed office March 2022
- Preceded by: Azad Ari Mardan
- Constituency: Lalganj

Personal details
- Born: 1 January 1976 (age 50) Azamgarh, Uttar Pradesh
- Party: Samajwadi Party
- Spouse: Lalati Devi
- Children: 3
- Parent: Teju Saroj (father)
- Education: Gandhi Smarak P. G. College
- Occupation: Farmer
- Profession: Politician

Bechai Saroj is an Indian politician, farmer, and a member of the Samajwadi Party and the 18th Uttar Pradesh Assembly from the Lalganj Assembly constituency of Azamgarh.

== Early life ==
Bechai Saroj was born on 1 January 1976 in Pasika, Azamgarh, to a Hindu family of Teju Saroj. He married Lalati Devi on 8 May 1998, and they have three children.

== Education ==
Bechai Saroj completed his graduation at Gandhi Smarak P. G. College, Jaunpur, in 1997.

== Posts held ==
#	From	To	Position	Comments
01	2022	Incumbent	Member, 18th Uttar Pradesh Assembly	

== See also ==
- 18th Uttar Pradesh Assembly
- Lalganj Assembly constituency
- Uttar Pradesh Legislative Assembly
