= Nizamabad Assembly constituency =

Constituency of the Uttar Pradesh legislative assembly in India

Coordinates: 26.06°N 83.06°E

Nizamabad
- Constituency No. 348 for the Uttar Pradesh Legislative Assembly

Constituency details
- Country: India
- Region: North India
- State: Uttar Pradesh
- District: Azamgarh
- Total electors: 3,27,480
- Reservation: None

Member of Legislative Assembly
- 18th Uttar Pradesh Legislative Assembly
- Incumbent Vacant
- Party: None
- Elected year: 2017

Nizamabad is a constituency of the Uttar Pradesh Legislative Assembly covering the city of Nizamabad in the Azamgarh district of Uttar Pradesh, India.

Nizamabad is one of five assembly constituencies in the Lalganj Lok Sabha constituency. Since 2008, this assembly constituency is numbered 348 amongst 403 constituencies.

== Election results ==
=== 2027 ===
2027 Uttar Pradesh Legislative Assembly election: Nizamabad
Party	Candidate	Votes	%	±%
INDIA				
NDA				
BSP				
NOTA	None of the above			
Majority				
Turnout				
gain from		Swing		

=== 2022 ===
Uttar Pradesh Legislative Assembly Elections: Nizamabad
Party	Candidate	Votes	%	±%
SP	Alambadi Azmi	79,835	43.47	▲3.05
BJP	Manoj Yadav	45,648	24.71	▼1.43
BSP	Piyush Kumar Singh	44,657	24.18	▼4.93
AIMIM	Abdur Rahman Ansari	6,100	3.3	New entry
INC	Anil Kumar Yadav	2,297	1.24	New entry
NOTA	None of the above	1,067	0.58	−0.17
Majority		34,187	18.51	+7.45
Turnout		184,712	56.4	+1.31
SP hold		Swing		

=== 2017 ===
2017 General Elections: Nizamabad
Party	Candidate	Votes	%	±%
SP	Alambadi Azmi	67,274	40.17	▼2.07
BSP	Chandra Dev Ram	48,745	29.11	▲2.63
BJP	Vinod Rai	43,786	26.14	▲11.57
NOTA	None of the above	1,243	0.75	New entry
Majority		18,529	11.06	▼4.70
Turnout		167,475	55.09	▲2.89
SP hold		Swing		

=== 2012 ===
2012 General Elections: Nizamabad
Party	Candidate	Votes	%	±%
SP	Alambadi Azmi	63,894	42.24	▲6.96
BSP	Kalamuddin Khan	40,051	26.48	▼18.92
BJP	Ranjana Devi	22,045	14.57	New entry
Majority		23,843	15.76	▲5.64
Turnout		1,51,259	52.2	▲10.5
SP gain from BSP		Swing		

=== 2007 ===
2007 General Elections: Nizamabad
Party	Candidate	Votes	%	±%
BSP	Angad Yadav	60,072	45.40	▲18.62
SP	Alambadi Azmi	46,674	35.28	▲4.85
INC	Moolchand Chauhan	6,683	5.05	▼3.84
Majority		23,843	10.12	▲6.47
Turnout		1,36,085	41.7	▼10.1
BSP gain from SP		Swing		

== Members of Legislative Assembly ==
#	Term	Member of Legislative Assembly	Party	From	To	Days	Comment
01	2nd Vidhan Sabha	Chandra Bali Brahmachari	Indian National Congress	April 1957	March 1962	1,800	
02	3rd Vidhan Sabha	Amjad Ali	Indian National Congress	March 1962	March 1967	1,828	
03	6th Vidhan Sabha	Mohd. Masud	Bharatiya Kranti Dal	March 1974	April 1977	1,153	
04	7th Vidhan Sabha	Mohd. Masud	Janata Party	June 1977	February 1980	969	
05	8th Vidhan Sabha	Chandra Bali Bramchari	Indian National Congress (Indira)	June 1980	March 1985	1,735	
06	9th Vidhan Sabha	Mohd. Masud	Lok Dal	March 1985	November 1989	1,725	
07	10th Vidhan Sabha	Ram bachan yadav	Indian National Congress	December 1989	April 1991	488	
08	11th Vidhan Sabha	Angad Yadav	Bahujan Samaj Party	June 1991	December 1992	533	
09	12th Vidhan Sabha	Angad Yadav	Bahujan Samaj Party	December 1993	October 1995	693	
10	13th Vidhan Sabha	Alam Badi	Samajwadi Party	October 1996	March 2002	1,967	
11	14th Vidhan Sabha	Alam Badi	Samajwadi Party	February 2002	May 2007	1,902	
12	15th Vidhan Sabha	Angad Yadav	Bahujan Samaj Party	May 2007	March 2012	1,736	
13	16th Vidhan Sabha	Alam Badi	Samajwadi Party	March 2012	March 2017	1,829	
14	17th Vidhan Sabha	Alam Badi	Samajwadi Party	March 2017	March 2022	3476	
15	18th Vidhan Sabha	Alam Badi	Samajwadi Party	March 2022	22 July 2026	1576	
