= Gothawn =

Gothawn गोठांव
- Town
- Location, Azamgarh Uttar Pradesh, India
- Coordinates: 25.935°N 82.911°E
- Country: India
- State: Uttar Pradesh
- District: Azamgarh

Government
  - Gram Pradhan: Shrimati Punam Yadav
  - District Magistrate: Shri Rajesh Kumar (IAS)

Population
  - Total: 5,037 (Census 2,011)

Languages
  - Official: Hindi, Urdu, English, Bhojpuri
- Time zone: UTC7 (IST)
- PIN: 276305
- Area codes: 05462, 05460

Religions in Gothawn
Religion	Percent
Hindus	45%
Buddhism	23%
Muslims	32%

Gothawn is a town located in the Azamgarh district of Uttar Pradesh, India. It comes under the Martinganj subdistrict There are three main religions Hinduism, Buddhism and Islam. International Buddhist Temple is the most important place here. It was founded by Venerable Chandrajeet Gautam.

This Village / Town is about 34 km from District Azamgarh headquarter. In this Village / City have 14th Wards and about 10th Mohallas (Bhatpura, Dihawa, Kewatana, Rewariya, Purva, Bharauti, Mandyiya, Bakrabad, etc.). This place is the main center of Buddhists of Eastern Uttar Pradesh. At this place, Chandrajeet Gautam was born. Here is a Buddhist Temple (International Buddhist Temple) founded by Chandrajeet Gautam. Chandrajeet Gautam has done incredible work in the religious and social fields. Because of the personal nature and loyal personality of Chandrajeet Gautam, many foreigners also come here, for example Buddhists, worshipers of Verma, Thailand, Sri Lanka and Korea etc. have given their presence. On this place, the work of burning the light of education was done by Subedar Singh Ji. At first, he opened the door of education for the untouchables here. Due to this work some people burnt their house even after you did not move back. Mr. Satyanarayan Singh Ji and Mr. Rajnarayan Singh ji also made special contributions to education. The name of Ram Prakash Yadav of this region is immortalized in the form of a famous doctor and social worker as well as the name of Freedom Fighter Ram Palat Yadav. His son, Dr. Sunil Kumar Yadav is also working as a social worker with a famous doctor. The village heads have a special contribution in the development of this area. Special contribution to the electrification of this region was former chief Laljit Rajbhar Ji.

== Temples & Mosques ==
- International Buddhist Temple
- Shiv Mandir (Purwa)
- Siv Mandir 2nd
- Jogibeer Baba Temple
- Baba Prahladdaas Temple
- Budhiya Maai Temple
- Burhau Baba Temple
- Gothawn Mosque (Usra)

== Organizations ==
- Baba Prahlad Das Yuva Shakti
- The Dhamma Global Foundation
- Buddhayaan Bheem Jyoti Samiti

== Schools ==
- Girls Primary School Gothawn
- Primary School Gothawn
- Junior High School Gothawn
- Vishal Gyan Deep Inter College
- Uday Smarak Inter College
- Buddhist Cultural High School
- RK Pathak Adarsh Inter College

== Hospitals ==
- Primary Health Center (Women's Hospital)

== Notable people ==
- Venerable Chandrajeet Gautam
- Ram Prakash Yadav (Freedom Fighter)
- Subedhar Singh
- Rajnarayan Singh
- Satyanarayan Singh

== List of Village Heads ==
Name with period

- Shri Janardan Singh (1950-1972)
- Shri Medhayi Rajbhar (1972-1990)
- Shri Laljit Rajbhar (1990-1995)
- Smt. Dharma Devi Rajbhar (1995-2000)
- Smt. Prabhavati Pathak (2000-2005)
- Mr.Vinod Rajbhar (2005-2010)
- Smt. Durgavati Bind (2010-2015)
- Smt. Pushpa Pathak (2015–2021)
- Smt. Punam Yadav (2021–present)

== Census 2011 data ==
Particulars	Total	Male	Female
Total No. of Houses	726	-	-
Population	5,037	2,424	2,613
Child (0-6)	791	397	394
Schedule Caste	859	391	468
Schedule Tribe	0	0	0
Literacy	65.50 %	75.83 %	56.06 %
Total Workers	1,973	1,051	922
Main Worker	1,755	0	0
Marginal Worker	218	62	156
