= Thakur Ji Pathak =

Indian social activist and politician (1968–1994)

Thakur Pathak
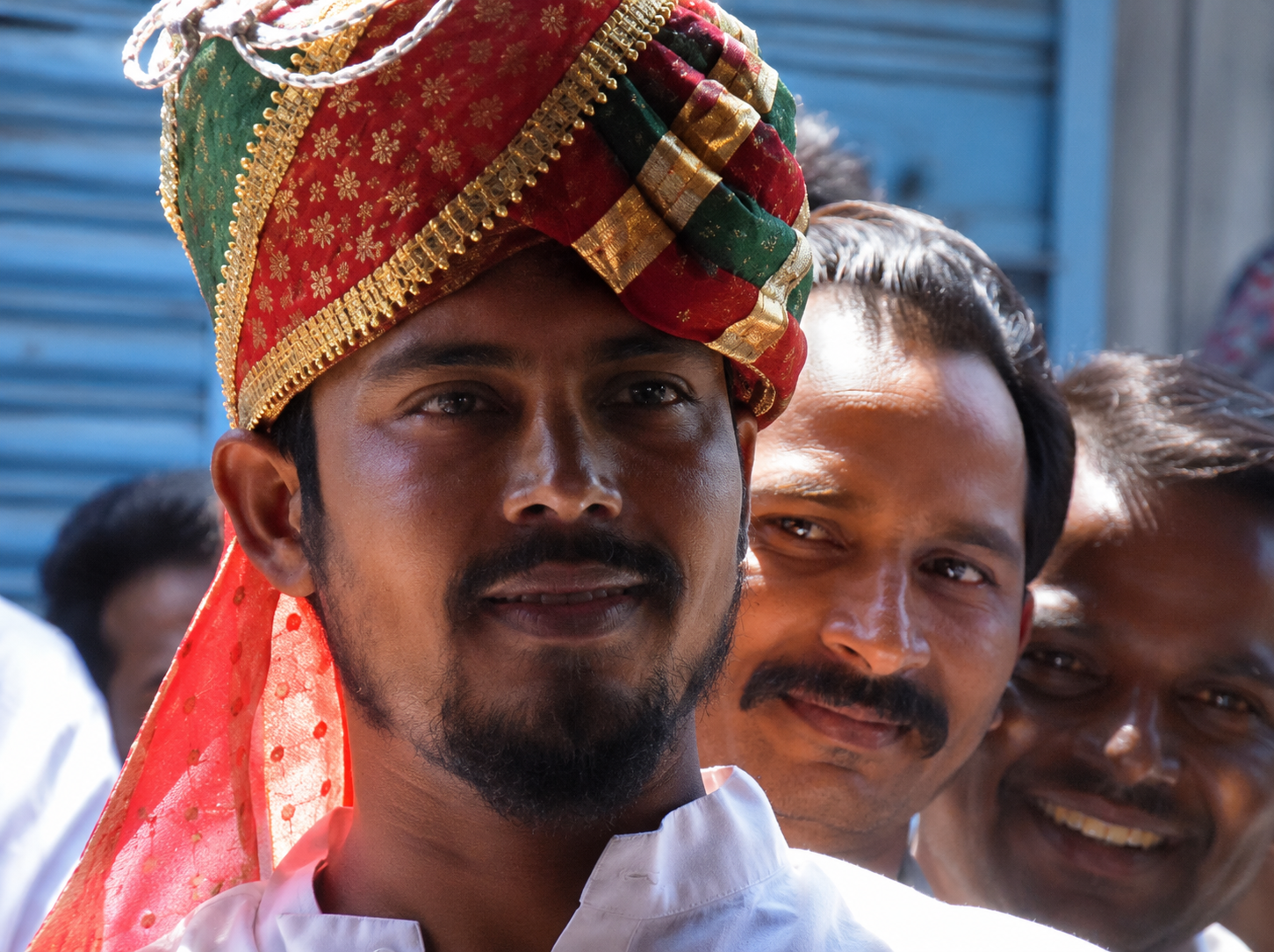

15th General Secretary of Janata Party
- In office National General Secretary
- In office 20 January 1982 – 20 January 1985
- President: Chandra Shekhar Singh

National General Secretary of Janata Dal
- In office 20 January 1989 – 20 January 1994
- President: V. P. Singh
- Preceded by: Position established
- Succeeded by: Position abolished
- In office 9 November 1989 – 30 May 1990
- Prime Minister: V. P. Singh

Personal details
- Born: 1968 Uttar Pradesh, Ballia
- Died: 1994 (aged 25–26) Jamshedpur High Court
- Party: Janata Dal, Janata party
- Spouse: Manju Pathak Devi
- Children: 2
- Education: Kmpm Inter College, Jamshedpur
- Occupation: Social activist, politician, businessman
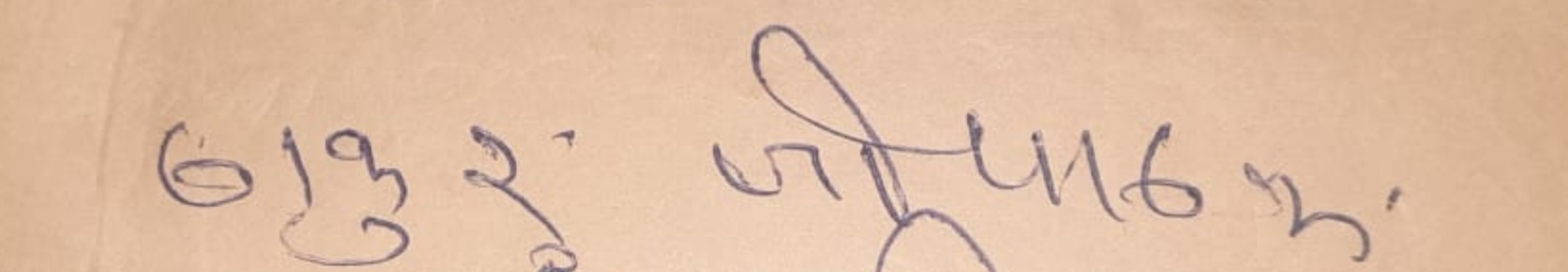
- Signature
- Website: https://ngo-site-921385012220.us-central1.run.app/

Thakur Pathak (1968–1994) was an Indian social activist and politician. He was the national general secretary of Janata Dal. In 1994, he was murdered by criminals.

== Early years ==
Thakur Pathak was born in 1968 to Kedarnath Pathak and Gunjeshwari Devi in the village Narahi, Ballia in the Ballia district of Uttar Pradesh, India. He was the youngest of three children. He was inclined to the political landscape of India from a very young age.

He graduated from the K.M.P.M Inter College, Jamshedpur Jharkhand. He completed his Intermediate in Arts at the age of 18.

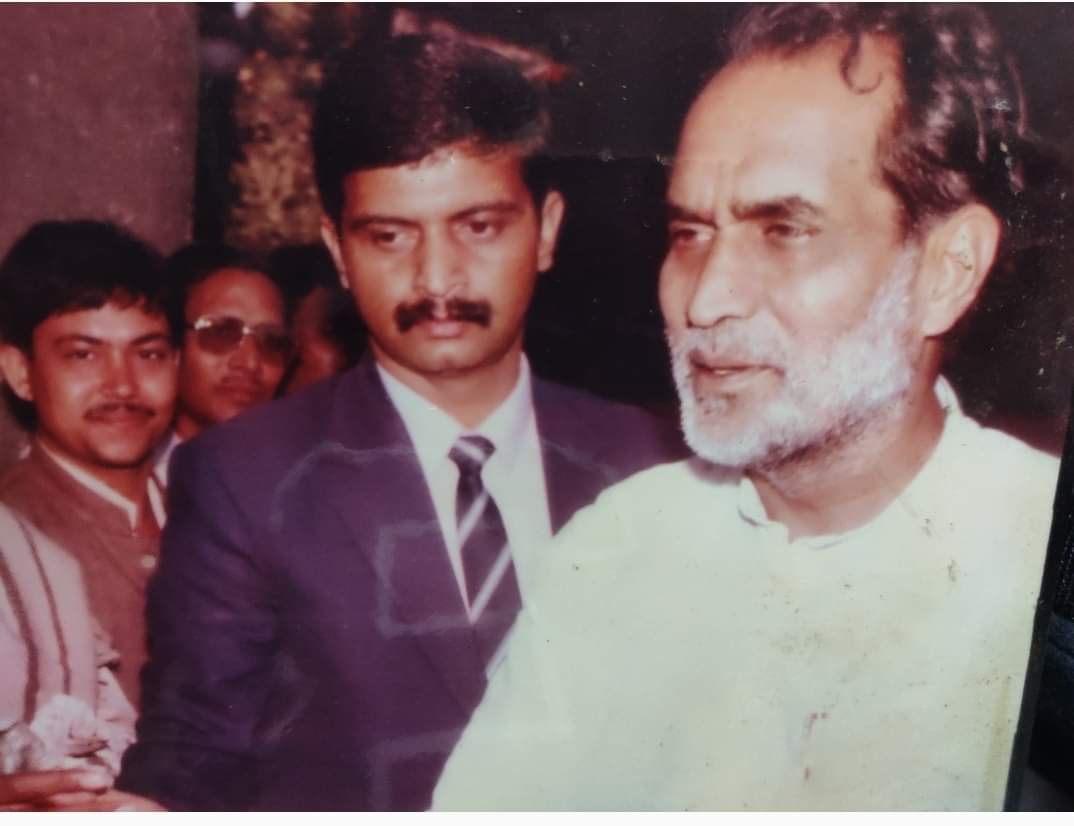
Pathak with former Prime Minister of India Chandra Shekhar at Pathak's home

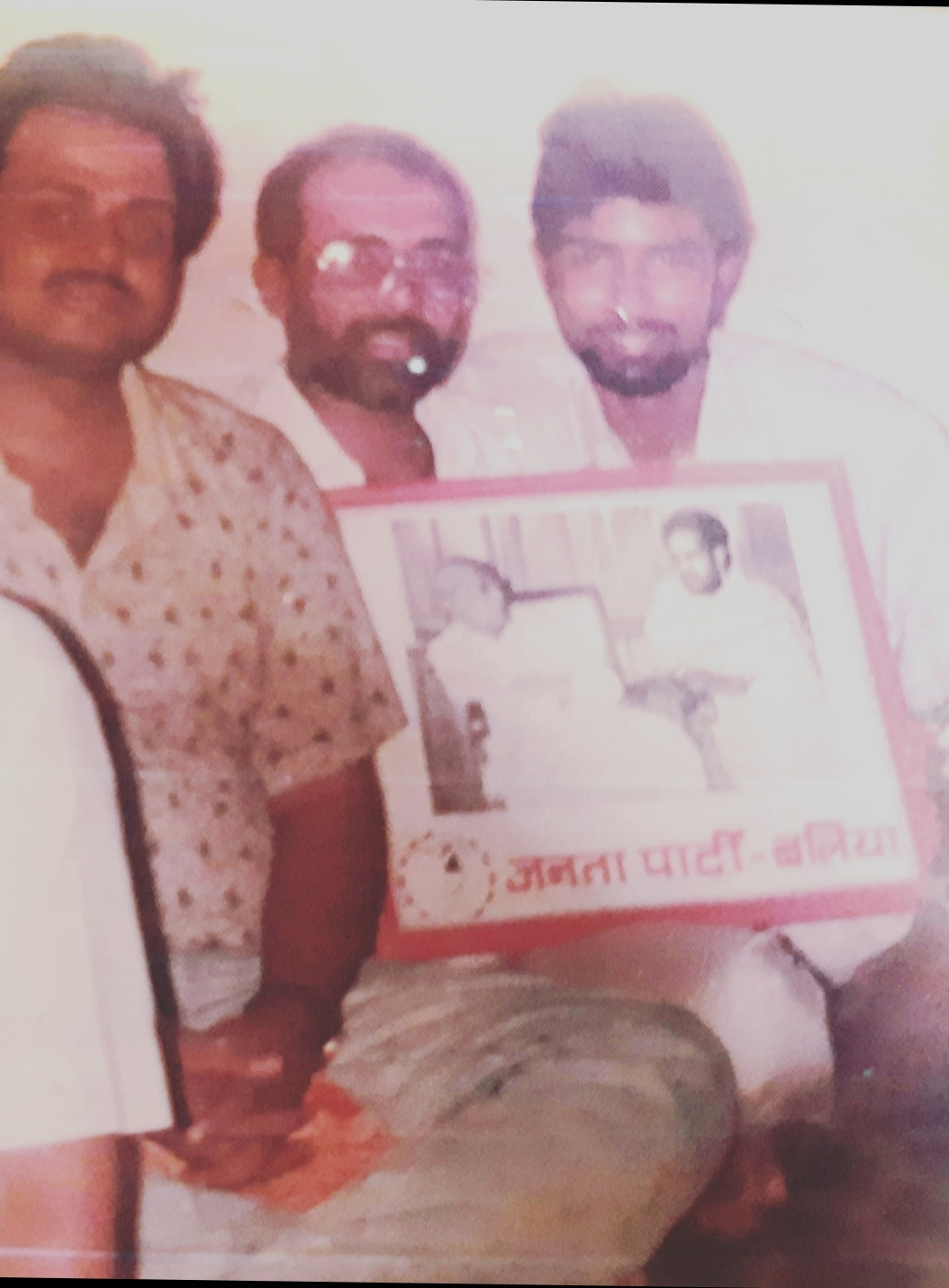
Thakur Ji Pathak house in Ballia Narahi Uttar Pradesh meeting with Janata party leaders at his Ballia Uttar Pradesh residence

== Political views ==
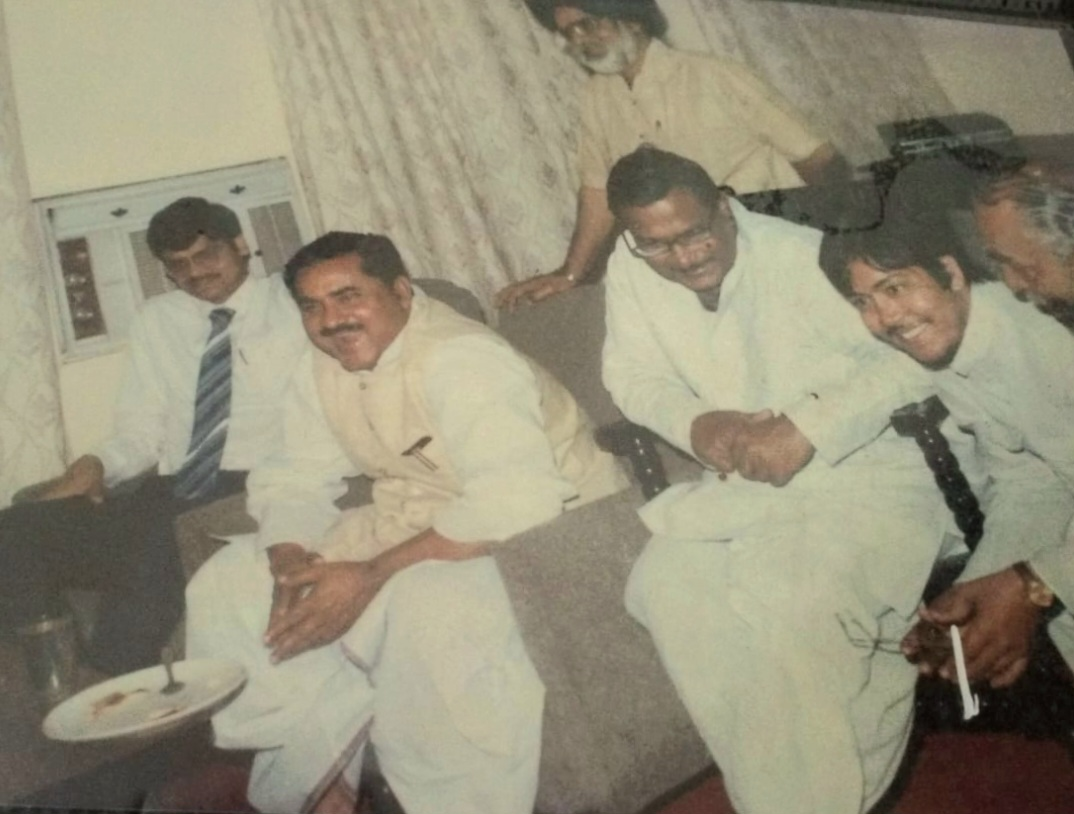
Pathak with Raghunath Jha Ji in Patna Ashoka Hotel with other party members

Pathak joined Janata party in the early 1980s to fulfill the demands of poor people from his constituency. He joined Janata Dal in 1988. He was an active supporter of women's rights.

Pathak was appointed as the national general secretary of Janata Dal in 1989. He maintained a close relationship with former prime minister of India Chandra Shekhar.

== Death ==
In March 1994, Pathak was shot by criminals in front of the Jamshedpur Session Court.

== In popular culture ==
After the incident of his murder, his followers named him as "Shaheed Thakur ji Pathak". In his memory, the Thakur Ji Pathak Welfare Society was founded in 1995. The organization actively supports needy and poor people.

In memory of Pathak, every year the organization facilitates the Shaheed Thakurji Pathak Welfare Award. In 2021 the awardees were Dr. Vishal Rao, Shalini Thakur and Tejasvi Surya.

== See also ==
- Janata Dal
- Janata Party
- List of assassinations in Asia
- List of assassinated Indian politicians
- List of people from Jamshedpur
- List of people from Jharkhand .
- List of people from Uttar Pradesh
