= Narahi, Ballia =

Narahi
- Village
- Location in Uttar Pradesh, India Narahi (India)
- Coordinates: 25.706665°N 84.027182°E
- Country: India
- State: Uttar Pradesh
- District: Ballia
- Tehsil: Ballia Sadar

Government
  - Type: Panchayati raj (India)
  - Body: Gram panchayat

Languages
  - Official: Hindi
  - Other spoken: Bhojpuri
- Time zone: UTC+5:30 (IST)
- Pin code: 277502
- Telephone code: 05496
- Vehicle registration: UP-60
- Website: up.gov.in

Narahi is a village located in Ballia Sadar tehsil of Ballia district, Uttar Pradesh, India. It has a total of 1,274 families as of 2011. Narahi had a population of 8,960 as per 2011 census.

== Youth leaders of Ballia ==
Thakur Ji Pathak Indian Activist, Politician, Businessman From Narahi, Ballia

== Administration ==
Narahi village is administrated by Gram Pradhan through its Gram Panchayat, who is elected representative of village as per constitution of India and Panchyati Raj Act.

According to the 2011 census, there were 4728 males and 4232 (total 8960) living in 1274 houses.

== Nearby places ==
- Ballia
- Buxar
- Patna
- Ghazipur
- Rasra
- Chitbara Gaon
- Phephna
- Dariapur (Ballia)
