= P. M. Nadagouda =

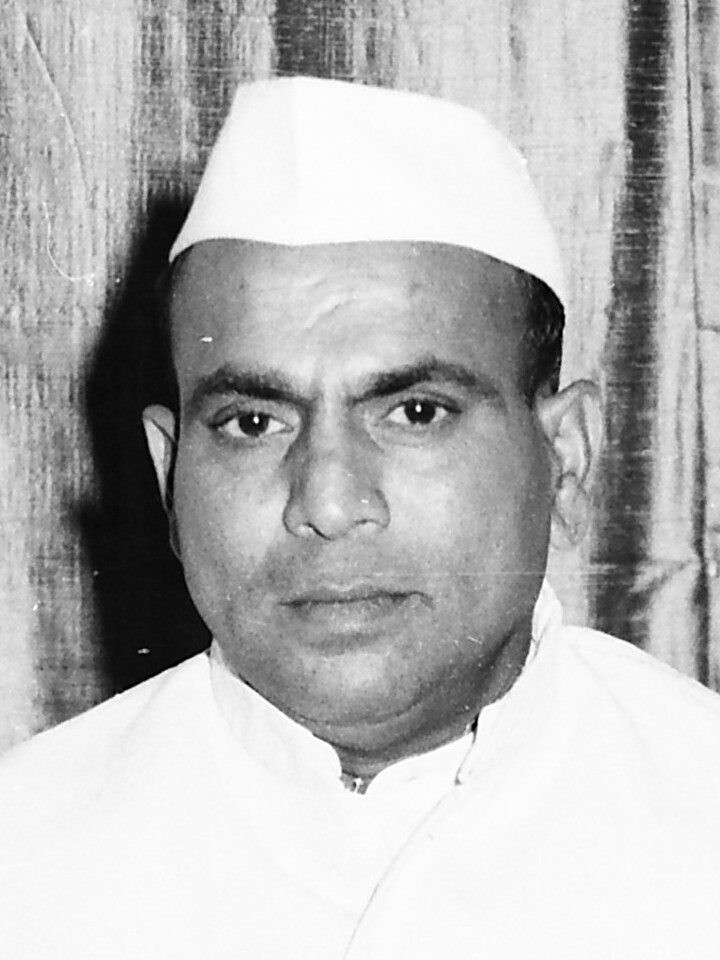
- P. M. Nadagouda in 1967

Minister for Development and Co-operation of Mysore State
- In office March 1967 – May 1968

Minister for Development of Mysore State
- In office 29 May 1968 – 27 March 1971

Personal details
- Born: Parvathagouda Nadagouda; 1 January 1918; Naikanur, Navalgunda taluk, Dharwad district, British India
- Died: 20 May 1976 (aged 56); Karnataka, India
- Cause of death: Heart attack
- Political party: Indian National Congress
- Spouse: Kashibai (m. 1945; died 2018)
- Education: L.L.B
- Profession: Activist; Politician

P. M. Nadagouda (1 January 1918 – 20 May 1976) was a senior Indian politician. He Was Minister for Development and Co-operation from March 1967 to May 1968 and Minister for Development from 29 May 1968 to 27 March 1971.

== Biography ==
P.M. Nadagouda (Parvathagouda) was born on 1 January 1918 in Naikanur in Navalgund, Nadagouda belonged to the dominant Panchamasali Lingayat community. He is the eldest son of Sri Mallanagouda and Saubhagyavati Basamma of the famous Nadagouda family of Chittawadgi Village in Hunagunda Taluk of Bagalkot district, Karnataka. He did his primary education in Chittawadgi. He was taken to Bagalkot by his uncle Mantappa, who was a lawyer in Bagalkot. Thus his secondary and higher education was completed at Basaveshwara School in Bagalkot. He later went on to get his Law degree from Raja Lakhamgouda Law College, Belgaum.

=== Positions held ===
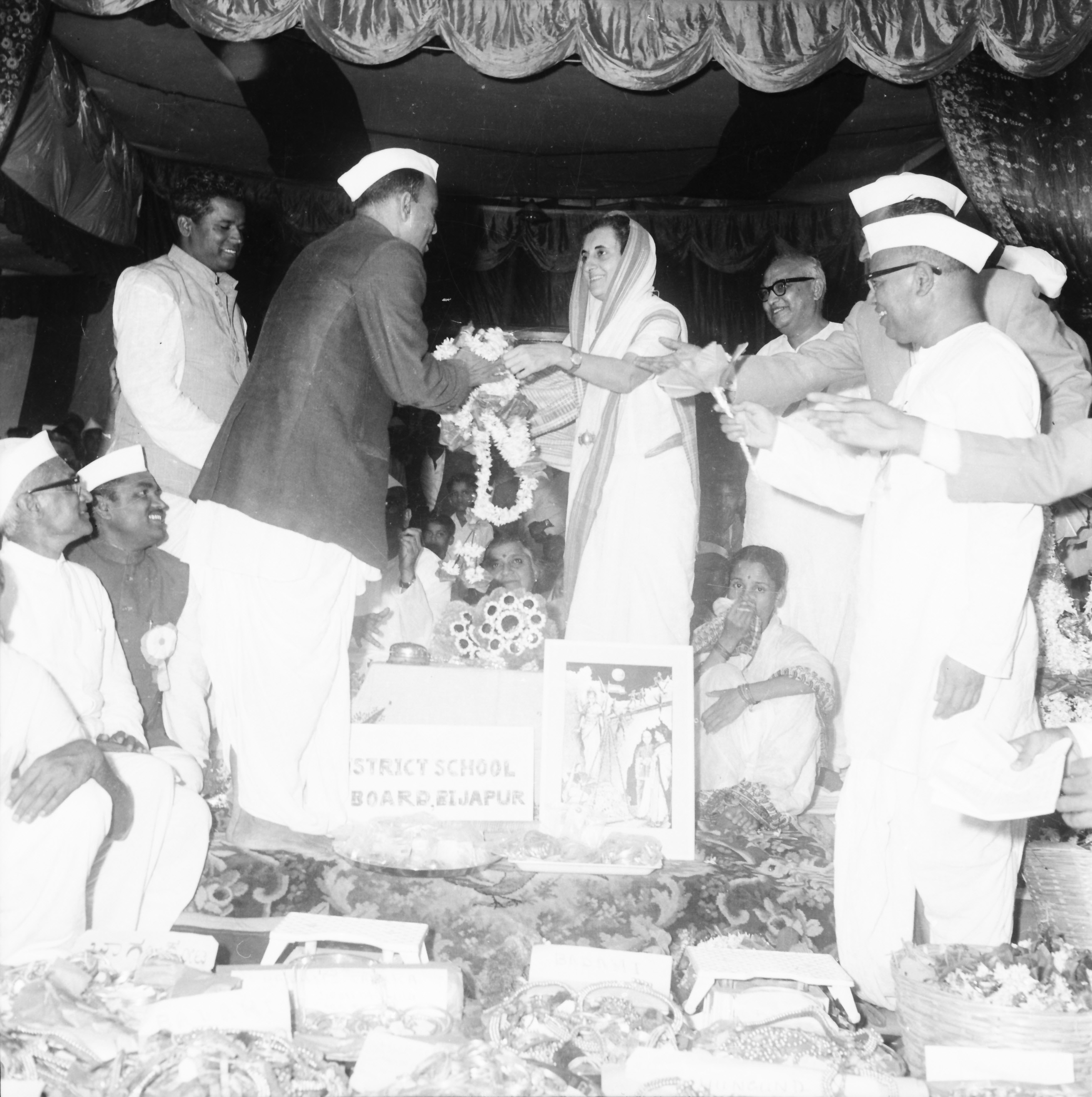
P. M. Nadagouda at Indira Gandhi Tulabhara

- Secretary of Bar Association and Taluk Congress Committee, Bagalkot.
- Had been the Chairman of the District School Board since 11 December 1952 . As chairman, District School Board, has done yeoman service in the field of primary education; has helped to start a number of backward ex-criminal Ashram Schools in Bijapur District.
- Was elected to the Senate of the Karnataka University since its inception; is a member of the Senate and Syndicate of the Karnataka University; is a member of the State Educational Integration Committee; is a member of the Governing Body of Basaveshwara College, Bagalkot and also a member of the Polytechnic Institute.
- Was elected to the Mysore State Legislative Council in 1958 and again in 1960; a member of D. C. C. and also of M. P. C. C.; was re-elected to the Legislative Council in 1966.
- Was Minister for Development and Co-operation from March 1967 to May 1968 and Minister for Development from 29 May 1968 to 27 March 1971. Was re-elected to the Council in 1972.

He died on 20 May 1976.
