= Makrand Desai =

Indian politician

Makarand Desai (Makarand Balwantrai Desai), (born 1935) was a leader of Bharatiya Janata Party (BJP) from Gujarat, who also remained BJP's National Secretary in the late 1980s.

== Work ==
He was a cabinet minister in Government of Gujarat from 1975 to 1976 and from 1977 to 1980, and held Industries portfolio. He was elected to Gujarat Legislative Assembly from Vadodara City constituency in 1975 state elections, though he lost the 1980 state elections, He lost again in 1985 state elections from Sayajigunj Assembly Constituency, and shifted to national level politics.He was a chemical engineer and worked as Jt Vice President at Jaycees International before entering politics in 1969. He studied BE, MS and then CE at Massachusetts Institute of Technology (USA) .

After he died, his wife, Neela Desai also remained active in politics, and in May 2014, she was one of few people invited from Gujarat to attend the swearing-in ceremony of Narendra Modi.
