= Vishram Prasad =

Indian politician (born 1923)

Member of Parliament, Lok Sabha
- In office 1962–1967
- Succeeded by: Ram Dhan
- Constituency: Lalganj, Uttar Pradesh

Personal details
- Born: 1 July 1923 Sarauli, Tanda Kalan, Varanasi District, United Provinces, British India (present-day Uttar Pradesh, India)
- Party: Praja Socialist Party
- Spouse: Rajia Devi
- Children: 3 Sons and 4 Daughters

Vishram Prasad (born 1 July 1923) was an Indian politician. He was elected to the Lok Sabha, the lower house of the Parliament of India from the Lalganj constituency of Uttar Pradesh as a member of the Praja Socialist Party.
