= Community Radio JIMS Vasant Kunj 90.4 MHz (India) =

Radio station in India

Community Radio JIMS Vasant Kunj 90.4 MHz was set up in 2005 to provide a platform to voice the issues of the community living in and around the Vasant Kunj area, apart from the faculty, staff, and students of the college. It is managed by the Jagannath Gupta Memorial Education Society and is run by Jagannath International Management School, Vasant Kunj, an affiliated institute of Guru Gobind Singh Indraprastha University, New Delhi, India. The station is empanelled with Directorate of Advertising and Visual Publicity (DAVP). CR JIMS VasantKunj was selected by the Ministry of Information and Broadcasting among the country's 24 Lead Operational Community Radio stations. Community Radio JIMS Vasant Kunj is a campus radio but there is active involvement of community in producing the content. Being an educational institution radio, it is producing content for the local community, of the local community and by the local community.

== Programming ==
Community Radio JIMS Vasant Kunj produces the content related to health and hygiene, with special focus on maternal and child care reproduction health and mental health, sanitation, agriculture, education, road safety, water conservation, rain water harvesting, folk culture and life, and women and children's rights. The program formats include talks, interviews, phone-ins, songs, poetry, stories, and chat-shows. There is active involvement of staff and student of journalism and mass communication in producing the content. The community members produce the content of the various radio programs broadcast, under the guidance of the faculty in the Department of Media and Communication studies.

The Community Radio JIMS Vasant Kunj is also producing content on Radio Mathematics, a project funded by National Council for Science and Technology Communication (NCSTC), Department of Science and Technology (India). It is aimed at producing 180 programmes on Radio Mathematics which are broadcast twice per day on a regular basis. The objective of these programmes is to make mathematics easy to understand for the local community people. It includes use of basic maths that is required to be implemented in daily lives of the community people.

Apart from Radio Mathematics, the station has also produced programmes on voter awareness under the project Systematic Voters' Education And Electoral Participation (SVEEP), funded by Election Commission of India in 2019.

CR JIMS VasantKunj 90.4 MHz is working and associated with organizations like SMART (NGO), UNHCR, UNESCO, BMGF, Room to Read, Community Radio Association (CRA), and Commonwealth Educational Media Centre for Asia (CEMCA).

Signature Programmes:

1. Aatm-Chintan: A program on spirituality and life values
2. Mansha: A program on women empowerment
3. Jeevan-Disha: A program on life skills including health, career options, etc
4. Baat Pate Ki: A program on government welfare schemes and other contextual and social issues
5. Corona Ki Baat: A program on creating awareness on Covid appropriate behavior, Covid vaccination hesitancy, and removing myths and misconceptions related to vaccination

Besides the Signature Programs, CR JIMS also produces and broadcasts programs on special days such as Yoga Day, Press Day, and AIDS Day.
