= Sayajigunj =

Coordinates: 22.3092°N 73.1848°E

Sayajigunj is an area in the western side of Vadodara in the state of Gujarat in India.

Vadodara Railway Station and Central State Transport Bus depot are located in Sayajigung, which is why it is referred to as a gateway to Vadodara. Maharaja Sayajirao University of Baroda, Vadodara Stock Exchange and Sayaji Baug are also located in this area. This area attracts younger adults, due to the fact that it is close to the university.The area is mostly covered with stock brokers offices, hotels, restaurants, banks, commercial complexes and University.
