= Alambadi (politician) =

Indian politician (1936–2026)

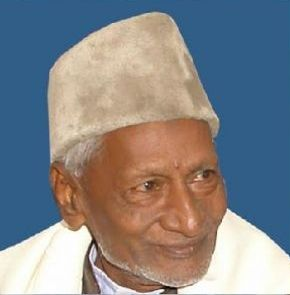

Member of the Uttar Pradesh Legislative Assembly
- In office March 2012 – 22 July 2026
- Preceded by: Angad Yadav
- Constituency: Nizamabad
- In office October 1996 – May 2007
- Preceded by: Angad Yadav
- Succeeded by: Angad Yadav
- Constituency: Nizamabad

Personal details
- Born: Alambadi Azmi; 16 March 1936 Bindaval, Azamgarh district, United Provinces of Agra and Oudh, British India
- Died: 22 July 2026 (aged 90) Lucknow, Uttar Pradesh, India
- Party: Samajwadi Party
- Spouse: Kudshiya Khan
- Children: 6
- Education: Diploma in Electrical and Mechanical Engineering
- Occupation: MLA
- Profession: Politician, engineer

Alambadi Azmi (16 March 1936 – 22 July 2026) was an Indian politician who was a member of the 18th Uttar Pradesh Assembly, representing Nizamabad constituency. He was a member of the Samajwadi Party.

== Background ==
Alambadi was born in Bindaval, Azamgarh district on 16 March 1936, to Vadivajma Azmi. He studied until Intermediate and held a diploma in Electrical and Mechanical Engineering. He was an engineer by profession. He married Kudasia Khan and had six sons.

Alambadi died on 22 July 2026, at the age of 90.

== Political career ==
Beginning in 1996, Alambadi represented the Nizamabad constituency and was a member of the Samajwadi Party. He was a member of the 13th, 14th, 16th and 17th Legislative Assemblies of Uttar Pradesh.

In the 2022 Uttar Pradesh Legislative Assembly election, Alambadi defeated the Bharatiya Janata Party's Manoj by a margin of 34,187, continuing his hold on the Nizamabad constituency seat and becoming a member of the 18th Uttar Pradesh Assembly in the process.

== See also ==
- Uttar Pradesh Legislative Assembly
