= Babubhai J. Patel =

Indian politician (1911–2002)

Babubhai Jashbhai Patel

6th Chief Minister of Gujarat
- In office 18 June 1975 – 12 March 1976
- Preceded by: President's rule
- Succeeded by: President's rule
- In office 11 April 1977 – 17 February 1980
- Preceded by: Madhav Singh Solanki
- Succeeded by: President's rule

Personal details
- Born: 9 February 1911 Nadiad, Bombay Presidency, British India
- Died: 19 December 2002 (aged 91) Gandhinagar, Gujarat, India
- Party: Janata Morcha, Janata Party

Babubhai Jashbhai Patel (9 February 1911 – 19 December 2002) was the chief minister of Gujarat state in India. He held the office twice, first time from June 1975 to March 1976 as the leader of Janata Morcha and the second time from April 1977 to February 1980 as leader of Janata Party.

== Early life ==
He was born on 9 February 1911 in Nadiad, Gujarat. He was a lawyer. He joined Indian independence movement in 1930 when he was in college. He went to jail seven times, till 1942.

== Career ==
He was a cabinet minister in Bombay state from 1952 to 1957. After formation of Gujarat, he lost from Cambay in 1962, but was elected to Gujarat Legislative Assembly in 1967 from Nadiad, lost from Nadiad in 1972, won from Sabarmati as NCO candidate in 1975 but lost from there in 1980 as Janata Party candidate, and won from Morvi in 1990. He held several ministerial posts in Gujarat over his political career.

In 1974, Chimanbhai Patel resigned from the post of Chief Minister due to Nav Nirman movement and assembly was dissolved. Later when elections were held in June 1975, Babubhai Patel became the Chief Minister of the first non-Congress government of Gujarat on 18 June 1975. He led the coalition of parties known as Janata Morcha. After a week, emergency was imposed by Indira Gandhi but he continued till March 1976 when Congress toppled his government. He again became CM leading Janata Party from 1977 to 1980. He shifted his cabinet to Morbi for six months during 1979 Machchhu dam failure disaster. He became a cabinet minister who headed Sardar Sarovar Dam project in Chimanbhai Patel government in early 1990s.

== Death ==
He died on 19 December 2002 at Gandhinagar.

== Recognition ==
- Vallabhbhai Patel Vishva Pratibha award by Vishwa Gujarati Samaj.

== See also ==
- Second Babubhai Patel ministry
- List of chief ministers of Gujarat
