= Daroga Saroj =

Indian politician

Daroga Prasad Saroj

Member of Parliament, Lok Sabha
- In office June 2024
- Preceded by: Sangeeta Azad
- Constituency: Lalganj

Personal details
- Born: 1 January 1956 (age 70) Azamgarh, Uttar Pradesh
- Party: Samajwadi Party
- Education: Gorakhpur University

Daroga Prasad Saroj (born 1 January 1956) Azamgarh (Uttar Pradesh) is an Indian politician for the Lalganj (Lok Sabha Constituency) in Uttar Pradesh.

Daroga Prasad Saroj from Azamgarh is a 3 time current M.P. from Lalganj Lok Sabha Constituency Azamgarh . Stepped into politics with his first election winning from Mehnagar Assembly Constituency as Samajwadi Party candidate in 1993 . He also went to contest Lok Sabha elections thereby winning his seat in 1998, 2004 and 2024 General Elections.

1998 -Elected to 12th Lok Sabha

1998-99 -Member, Committee on Food, Civil Supplies and Public Distribution and its Sub-Committee - C on Department of Consumer Affairs

-Member, Committee on Social Justice and Empowerment

-Member, Committee on Members of Parliament Local Area Development Scheme

-Member, Consultative Committee, Ministry of Social Justice and Empowerment

2004 - Re-elected to 14th Lok Sabha (2nd term)

2007 - Member, Committee on Food, Consumer Affairs & Public Distribution

2024 -Elected to 18th Lok Sabha from Lalganj Parliamentary Constituency (68) Uttar Pradesh.
