= Akbarpur Airstrip =

Airport in Ambedkar Nagar, Uttar Pradesh, India

Akbarpur Airstrip अकबरपुर हवाई पट्टी अंबेडकर नगर
- IATA: none; ICAO: none; GPS: VI90

Summary
- Airport type: Private
- Owner: Government of Uttar Pradesh
- Operator: Government of Uttar Pradesh
- Serves: Akbarpur, Tanda, Rajesultanpur
- Location: Akbarpur, Ambedkar Nagar, Uttar Pradesh
- Elevation AMSL: 288 ft / 88 m
- Coordinates: 26°26′49″N 82°34′07″E
- Website: ambedkarnagar.nic.in

Map
- Location of airport in Uttar Pradesh

Runways
Direction	Length		Surface
Direction	ft	m	Surface
11/29	5,972	1,820	Asphalt
- Source: India Airport and CAPP; Authorised Source: AAI

Akbarpur Airstrip is an airstrip/aerodrome located in Akbarpur, Ambedkar Nagar, Uttar Pradesh.

== Description ==
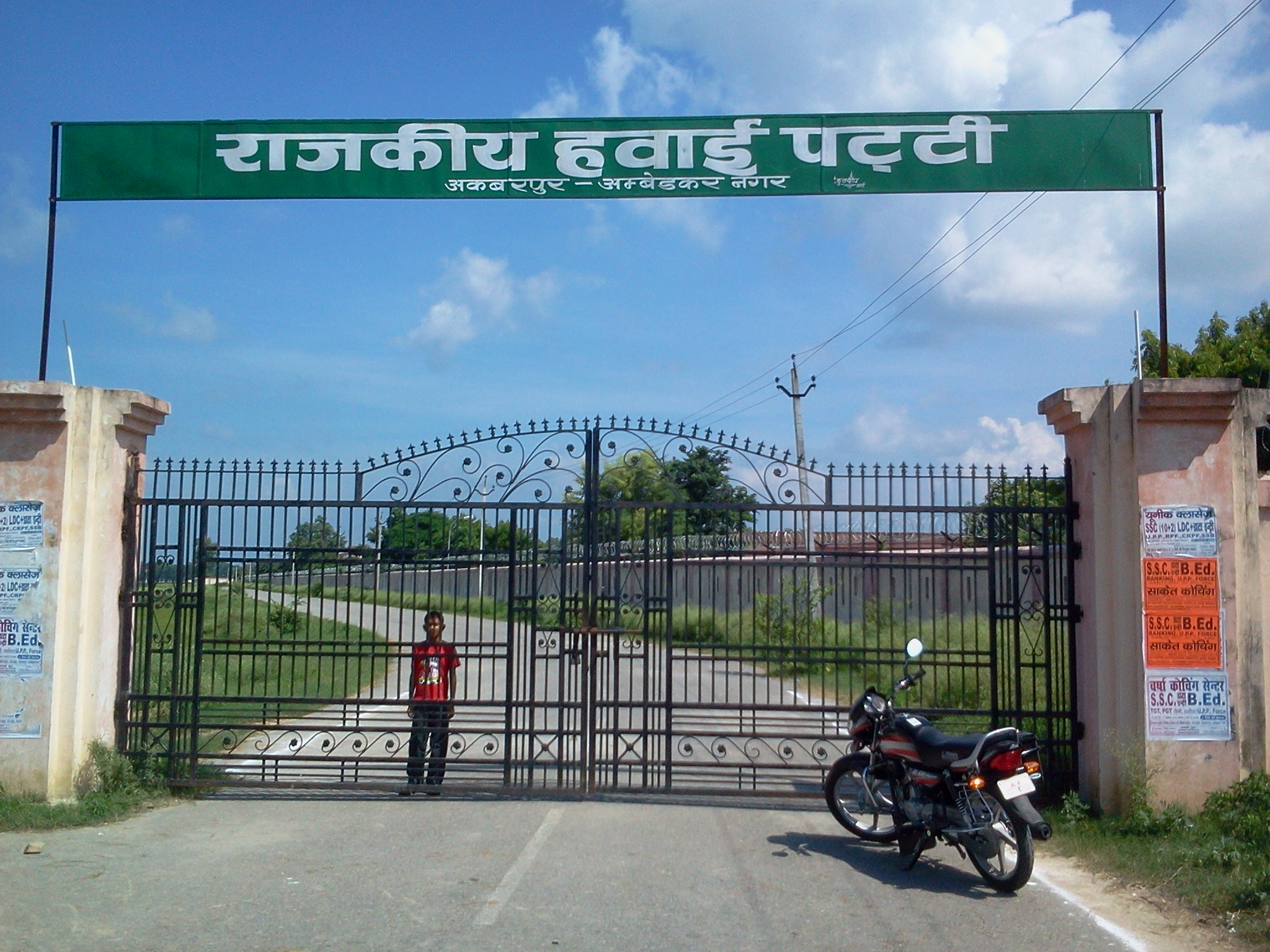
Government airstrip, Akbarpur

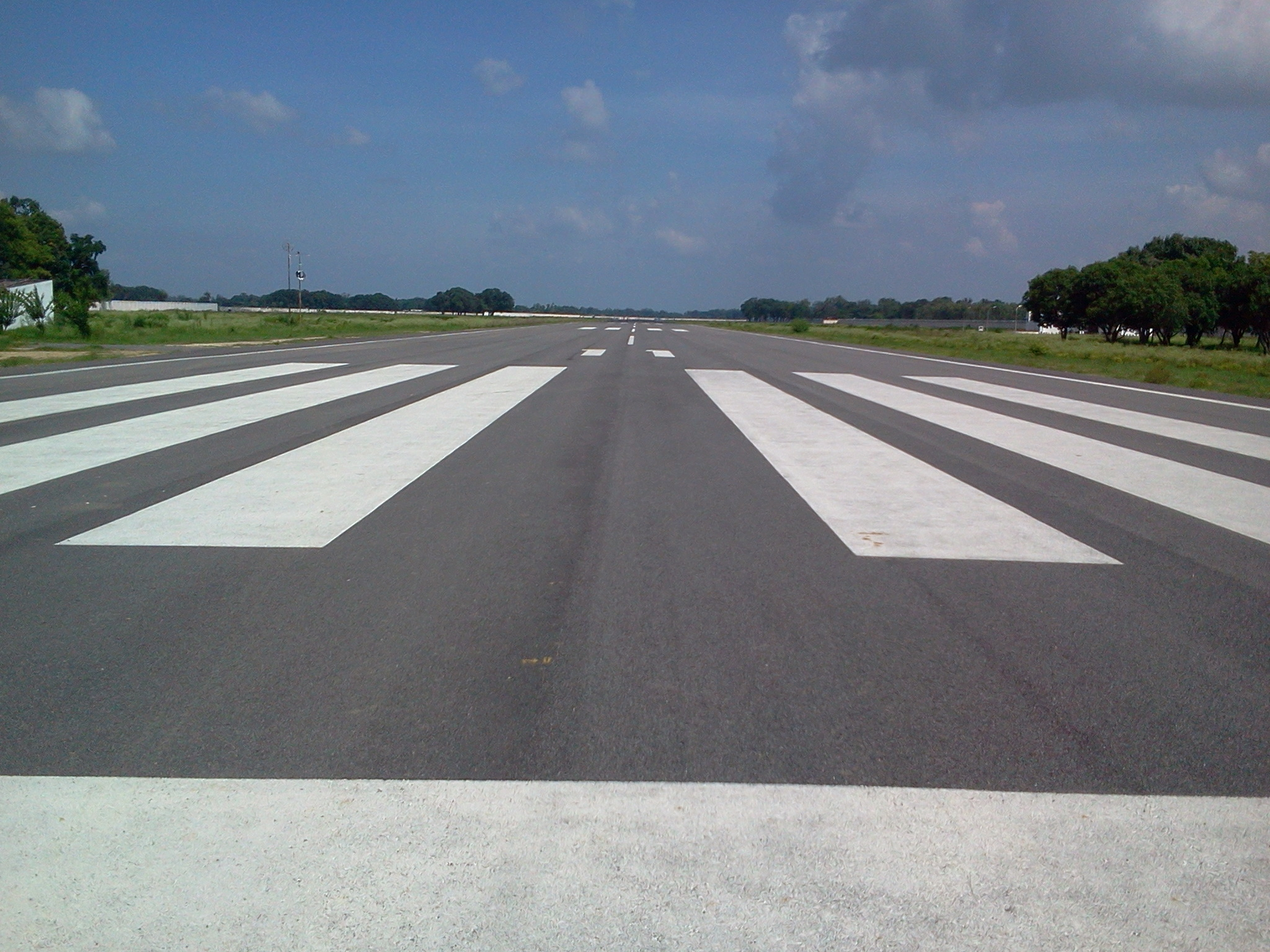
Akbarpur runway

The government is giving this airstrip to private investors for setting up their pilot training institutes and aircraft maintenance engineering institutes.
This is an Aerodrome operated by the State Government.

- Type of operation : VFR
- Owner/Operator : State Government
- Aerodrome Elevation (Meters) : N/A
- Coordinates :2627N-08234E
- Runway : 11/29
- Dimensions : 5972 ft. x 99 ft.
- Surface : Asphalt
- Suitable for aircraft : Hawker 900XP

Previously, the procedure for private use of the airstrip was lengthy: The owner of the private aircraft had to contact the respective district magistrate who would further contact the directorate which would take the measures required for landing of the aircraft. Now, according to the new order, the directorate will only give its nod and the institutes will take care of the rest.

In 2003, the state government had issued similar orders exclusively for people from the film industry. The charges were Rs 200 per landing along with Rs 1,000 per day for shooting at the air strip. The airstrip was, however, never used for shooting. The government has also decided to give

subsidy in the landing and parking for ‘cross- country flying’ purposes, which means flying trainer aircraft from one aerodrome to another. Such aircraft will be charged half of the normal landing and parking fee, which will be Rs 250 for landing and Rs 100 per day for parking after two days of free parking.

== Scheduled flights ==
There are no scheduled flights. The airport is used by private and chartered planes.

== See also ==
- Lucknow International Airport
- Varanasi International Airport
- Taj International Airport
- Kanpur Airport
- Prayagraj Airport
- Raebareli Airport
- Ayodhya Airport
