= Janata Morcha =

Coalition of Indian political parties formed in 1974

The Janata Morcha (lit. 'People's Front') was a coalition of Indian political parties formed in 1974 to oppose the government of Indian Prime Minister Indira Gandhi and her Congress (R) party. The coalition was an integral part of the popular movement against the Emergency rule of Indira Gandhi and the direct predecessor of the Janata Party, which defeated the Congress (R) in the 1977 Indian general election to form the first non-Congress government in independent India. It was formed by Jayaprakash Narayan and Morarji Desai, chief of the main opposition Congress (O) party.

== History ==
For the 1971 Indian general election, the Congress (O), Samyukta Socialist Party and the Bharatiya Jana Sangh had formed a coalition called the "Grand Alliance" to oppose Indira Gandhi and the Congress (R), but failed to have an impact; Indira's Congress (R) won a large majority in the 1971 elections and her popularity increased significantly after India's victory in the war of 1971 against Pakistan. However, Gandhi's subsequent inability to address serious issues such as unemployment, poverty, inflation and shortages eroded her popularity.

== Formation and election victory ==
The Janata Morcha was formed by Jayaprakash Narayan and Morarji Desai as an alliance of political parties opposed to the Congress (R) and Indira Gandhi. The constituents included the Congress (O), Bharatiya Jana Sangh, Samyukta Socialist Party and the BLD. The Janata Morcha won a surprising victory in the elections held for the Vidhan Sabha (Legislative Assembly) of the Indian state of Gujarat on 11 June 1975. The next day, the Allahabad High Court judged Indira Gandhi guilty of electoral malpractices, invalidated her 1971 election victory and barred her from elective office for six years. This led Indira to impose a state of emergency on 26 June 1975. Indira's government used the state of emergency to clamp down on opposition and dissolved the newly elected assembly, preventing the Morcha from forming the government and taking power.

== Janata Party ==
During the emergency, the leaders and activists of the Janata Morcha were imprisoned. After the 1977 elections were called, the constituents of the Janata Morcha formally launched the Janata Party on 18 January 1977, determined to forge a united front of all opposition political parties. The Janata party replicated the success of the Morcha in Gujarat by winning the 1977 elections and forming the first non-Congress government of India.
