= Sangeeta Azad =

Indian politician

Member of Parliament, Lok Sabha
- In office 23 May 2019 – June 2024
- Preceded by: Neelam Sonkar
- Succeeded by: Daroga Prasad Saroj
- Constituency: Lalganj

Personal details
- Born: 24 June 1981 (age 45) Azamgarh, Uttar Pradesh, India
- Party: Bharatiya Janta Party
- Other political affiliations: Bahujan Samaj Party
- Spouse: Azad Ari Mardan (m. 2002)
- Children: 3
- Education: Mumbai University (B.Sc), Purvanchal University (B.Ed)

Sangeeta Azad (born 24 June 1981) is an Indian politician. She is elected to the Lok Sabha, lower house of the Parliament of India from Lalganj, in Uttar Pradesh in the 2019 Indian general election as a member of the Bahujan Samaj Party. Sangeeta Azad joined BJP on 18 March 2024.

== Personal life ==
Azad was born on 24 June 1981 to Ramlakhan Bhaskar and Indulata Bhaskar in Azamgarh, Uttar Pradesh. She graduated with a Bachelor of Science degree from Mumbai University in 2003 and Bachelor of Education degree from Veer Bahadur Singh Purvanchal University in 2007. She married Azad Ari Mardan on 25 May 2002, with whom she has a son and two daughters. She does social service and is a businessperson by profession.
