= Chhangur Ram =

Indian politician

MP
- Preceded by: Ramdhan
- Succeeded by: Ramdhan
- Constituency: Lalganj

Personal details
- Born: 21 July 1932 Katain, Pavani Kalan, Azamgarh, Uttar Pradesh
- Died: 16 June 2005 (aged 72) Azamgarh
- Party: JD
- Children: 2 sons and 2 daughters
- As of 12 September, 2009

Chhangur Ram (born at Village - Katain, Azamgarh) was an Indian politician for the Lalganj (Lok Sabha Constituency) in Uttar Pradesh. He died on 16 June 2005.
