= Sukhdev Rajbhar =

Indian politician (1951–2021)

Member of Uttar Pradesh Legislative Assembly
- In office March 2017 – 18 October 2021
- Preceded by: Adil Sheikh
- Succeeded by: Kamlakant Rajbhar
- Constituency: Didarganj

16th Speaker of the Uttar Pradesh Legislative Assembly
- In office 18 May 2007 – 13 April 2012
- Chief Minister: Mayawati
- Preceded by: Mata Prasad Pandey
- Succeeded by: Mata Prasad Pandey

Member of Uttar Pradesh Legislative Assembly
- In office February 2002 – March 2012 (two terms)
- Preceded by: Narendra Singh
- Succeeded by: Bechai
- In office June 1991 – October 1995 (two terms)
- Preceded by: Shree Prakash
- Succeeded by: Narendra Singh
- Constituency: Lalganj

Personal details
- Born: 5 September 1951 Bargahan, Uttar Pradesh, India
- Died: 18 October 2021 (aged 70) Lucknow, Uttar Pradesh, India
- Party: Indian National Congress, Bahujan Samaj Party and Samajwadi Party externally in last days of life.
- Occupation: MLA
- Profession: Politician, Agriculture

Sukhdev Rajbhar (5 September 1951 – 18 October 2021) was an Indian politician and a senior member of 11th, 12th, 14th, 15th, and 17th Legislative Assembly (For five terms as a senior member), Uttar Pradesh of India. He also served as the Speaker of the 15th Uttar Pradesh State Legislative Assembly from 2007-2012 in the Bahujan Samaj Party's Mayawati Government as well as a Cabinet Minister, Minister Of State (Independent Charge), Minister Of State at various occasions in the cabinet of several chief ministers in the government of Uttar Pradesh, he also served as a member of the Uttar Pradesh State Legislative Council (M.L.C) for 1 term for 6 years from B.S.P. He represented the Didarganj constituency in Azamgarh district of Uttar Pradesh. He was a Speaker of the Legislative Assembly of Uttar Pradesh and a Minister in the Mayawati, Kalyan Singh and Mulayam Singh Yadav cabinets.

== Political career ==
Sukhdev Rajbhar contested Uttar Pradesh Assembly election as Bahujan Samaj Party candidate and defeated his close contestant Adil Sheikh from Samajwadi Party with a margin of 3,645 votes.

== Posts held ==
- 1991–1993 Member, 11th Legislative Assembly of Uttar Pradesh (first term)
  - Member, Scheduled Castes, Scheduled Tribes and Denitrified Tribes related joint committee
- 1993–1994 Member, 12th Legislative Assembly of Uttar Pradesh (second term)
  - State Minister, Co-operatives, Muslim Waqf Department (Mulayam Singh Yadav Cabinet)
- 1994–1995 State Minister, Department of Secondary and Basic Education (Mulayam Singh Yadav ministry)
- 1995–1997 Minister, Secondary, Basic and Adult Education (Mayawati Cabinet)
- 1997–2002 Member, Uttar Pradesh Legislative Council
  - Minister for Rural Development, Ambedkar Village Development and the Provincial Department of Defense Party (Mayawati Cabinet)
  - Minister for Rural Development, Minor Irrigation Department (MKalyan Singh Cabinet)
- 2002–2007 Member, 14th Legislative Assembly of Uttar Pradesh (third term)
  - Minister of Parliamentary Affairs, textiles and silk Industry Department (Mayawati Cabinet)
  - Member, Committee on Rules
  - Member, Working – Advisory Committee
- 2007–2012 Member, 15th Legislative Assembly of Uttar Pradesh (fourth term)
  - Speaker, Legislative Assembly of Uttar Pradesh
- 2017-Incumbent Member, 17th Legislative Assembly of Uttar Pradesh (fifth term)

== See also ==
- Uttar Pradesh Legislative Assembly
