= 102.2 FM =

FM radio frequency

This is a list of radio stations that broadcast on FM frequency 102.2 MHz:

== Belgium ==
- Radio Contact in Brussels

== China ==
- CNR The Voice of China in Changzhou, Jiangmen and Wenshan
- Changsha Music Radio in Changsha

== Indonesia ==
- Prambors Radio in Jakarta
- Persada FM in Sragen Regency, and Surakarta, Central Java

== Ireland ==
- Dublin's Q102 in Dublin
- West Limerick 102 in Newcastle West

== Romania ==
- Radio România Actualități in Ploiești and surrounding areas

== Turkey ==
- TRT Radyo Haber at Gaziantep

== United Kingdom ==
- Capital Midlands in Birmingham, West Midlands
- Forth 1 in Penicuik
- Greatest Hits Radio Cumbria & South West Scotland in Workington
- Greatest Hits Radio Lincolnshire in Lincolnshire
- Greatest Hits Radio Cornwall in North & East Cornwall.
- Heart West in Chippenham
- Radio Wester Ross in Ullapool
- SIBC in the Shetland Islands
- Smooth London in London

== Vietnam ==
- Haiphong 102.2 FM in Haiphong Vietnam
