= Neelam Sonkar =

Indian politician

Member of Parliament, Lok Sabha
- In office 2014–2019
- Preceded by: Bali Ram
- Succeeded by: Sangeeta Azad
- Constituency: Lalganj

Personal details
- Born: 11 February 1973 (age 52); Gorakhpur, Uttar Pradesh, India
- Political party: Bharatiya Janata Party
- Spouse: Rajendra Prasad (m. 1993)
- Children: 1 son, 1 daughter
- Parents: Ramchandra (father); Bhagyvani Devi (mother)
- Education: Master of Arts
- Alma mater: Gorakhpur University
- Profession: Politician

Neelam Sonkar (born 11 February 1973) is an Indian politician.

She contested Indian general elections 2014 from Lalganj Seat of Uttar Pradesh as Bhartiya Janata Party candidate to enter in 16th Lok Sabha.

She is Post Graduate M.A. from Gorakhpur University in 1998.

== Early life and education ==
Sonkar was born on 11 February 1973 to Shri Ramchandra and Smt. Bhagyvani Devi. She was born in Gorakhpur in Uttar Pradesh. Neelam Sonkar has completed her Master of Arts (MA) from Gorakhpur University.

== Positions held ==
- May 2014 : Elected to 16th Lok Sabha
- 1 Sep. 2014 onwards : Member, Standing Committee on Social Justice and Empowerment.
- April. 2016 onwards : Member, National Level Steering Committee on Standup India Programme.
