= Kamlakant Rajbhar =

Indian politician (born 1986)

Member of the 18th Uttar Pradesh Assembly
- Incumbent
- Assumed office March 2022
- Preceded by: Sukhdev Rajbhar
- Constituency: Didarganj Constituency

Personal details
- Born: 10 July 1986 (age 40) Azamgarh, India
- Party: Samajwadi Party
- Spouse: Mridu Rajbhar
- Parents: Sukhdev Rajbhar (father); Sumitra Devi (mother)
- Education: Bachelor of Laws
- Alma mater: Chhatrapati Shahu Ji Maharaj University
- Occupation: Politician

Kamlakant Rajbhar is an Indian politician and a member of the 18th Uttar Pradesh Assembly from Didarganj Assembly constituency. He is a member of the Samajwadi Party.

== Early life ==
Kamlakant Rajbhar was born on 10 July 1986 in Azamgarh to a Hindu Rajbhar family of Sukhdev Rajbhar and Sumitra Devi. He married Mridu Rajbhar on 3 December 2007.

== Education ==
Kamlakant Rajbhar completed his education at Chhatrapati Shahu Ji Maharaj University, Kanpur, with a Bachelor of Laws degree.

== Posts held ==
| # | From | To | Position | Comments |
|---|---|---|---|---|
| 01 | 2022 | Incumbent | Member, 18th Uttar Pradesh Assembly | |
