= Didarganj Assembly constituency =

Constituency of the Uttar Pradesh legislative assembly in India

Coordinates: 25.99°N 82.77°E

Didarganj
- Constituency No. 350 for the Uttar Pradesh Legislative Assembly

Constituency details
- Country: India
- Region: North India
- State: Uttar Pradesh
- District: Azamgarh
- Reservation: None

Member of Legislative Assembly
- 18th Uttar Pradesh Legislative Assembly
- Incumbent Kamlakant Rajbhar
- Party: Samajwadi Party
- Elected year: 2022

Didarganj is a constituency of the Uttar Pradesh Legislative Assembly covering the city of Didarganj in the Azamgarh district of Uttar Pradesh, India.

Didarganj is one of five assembly constituencies in the Lalganj Lok Sabha constituency. Since 2008, this assembly constituency is numbered 350 amongst 403 constituencies.

== Election results ==
=== 2027 ===
2027 Uttar Pradesh Legislative Assembly election: Didarganj
Party	Candidate	Votes	%	±%
INDIA				
NDA				
BSP	Abul Qais Azmi			
NOTA	None of the above			
Majority				
Turnout				
gain from		Swing		

=== 2022 ===
2022 Uttar Pradesh Legislative Assembly election: Didarganj
Party	Candidate	Votes	%	±%
SP	Kamlakant Rajbhar	74,342	36.99	▲5.79
BJP	Krishna Murari Vishwakarma	60,781	30.25	▲3.58
BSP	Bhupendra	47,094	23.43	▼9.72
RUC	Huzaifa Aamir Rashadi	10,070	5.01	
AIMIM	Zaved	2,199	1.09	
NOTA	None of the above	864	0.43	▼0.46
Majority		13,561	6.74	▲4.79
Turnout		200,957	54.98	▲0.11
SP gain from BSP		Swing		

=== 2017 ===
Bahujan Samaj Party candidate Sukhdev Rajbhar won in last Assembly election of 2017 Uttar Pradesh Legislative Elections defeating Samajwadi Party candidate Adil Sheikh by a margin of 3,645 votes.

2017 Uttar Pradesh Legislative Assembly election: Didarganj
Party	Candidate	Votes	%	±%
BSP	Sukhdev Rajbhar	62,125	33.15	
SP	Adil Shaikh	58,480	31.2	
BJP	Krishna Murari	49,979	26.67	
Independent	Archana	6,828	3.64	
Mahakranti Dal	Jashwant	2,227	1.19	
NISHAD	Ranvijay	2,105	1.12	
NOTA	None of the above	1,653	0.89	
Majority		3,645	1.95	
Turnout		187,419	54.87	

== Members of Legislative Assembly ==
#	Term	Member of Legislative Assembly	Party	From	To	Days	Comment
01	16th Vidhan Sabha	Adil Shaikh Azmi	Samajwadi Party	March 2012	March 2017	1,829	
02	17th Vidhan Sabha	Sukhdev Rajbhar	Bahujan Samaj Party	March 2017	October 2021	3535	
03	18th Vidhan Sabha	Kamlakant Rajbhar	Samajwadi Party	March 2022	Incumbent		
