= Bali Ram =

Indian politician

Member of Parliament for Lalganj
- In office 1 June 2009 – 16 May 2014

Personal details
- Born: 14 June 1954 (age 72) Bharpur Pichhawar, Azamgarh District
- Party: Bahujan Samaj Party
- Spouse(s): Kamla Devi; Married 15 May 1980
- Children: 1 Son and 3 Daughters
- Education: M.A., M.Ed. and Ph.D. from Banaras Hindu University
- Profession: Teacher and Educationist
- Father’s name: Baij Nath
- Mother’s name: Gujrati Devi
- Official Biography: http://164.100.47.132/LssNew/members/Biography.aspx?mpsno=36

Bali Ram is a member of Lok Sabha, Lower House of the Parliament of India. He was elected to 15th Lok Sabha in 2009 as a representative of Lalganj, a parliamentary constituency in the state of Uttar Pradesh.

He holds the master's degree in Education and Doctorate from Banaras Hindu University.

== Social and cultural activities ==
He is associated with social transformation activities and for the upliftment of lower strata, downtrodden, Scheduled Caste, Scheduled Tribes in his Constituencies.
