= Janata Party =

Political party in India

- Abbreviation: JP
- President: Navneet Chaturvedi
- Founder: Jayaprakash Narayan
- Founded: 23 January 1977; 49 years ago
- Merger of: Indian National Congress (Organisation); Bharatiya Jana Sangh; Bharatiya Lok Dal; Socialist Party; Congress for Democracy (after creation)
- Youth wing: Janata Yuva Morcha
- Women's wing: Janata Mahila Morcha
- Ideology: Big tent
- Political position: Centre-right to centre-left
- Slogan: Janata se Janata ke liye जनता से जनता के लिए
- ECI status: Registered Unrecognised Political

Election symbol

The Janata Party (JP, lit. 'People's Party') is an unrecognised political party in India. Navneet Chaturvedi is the current president of the party since November 2021, replacing Jai Prakash Bandhu.

The JP was established as an amalgam of Indian political parties opposed to the Emergency that was imposed between 1975 and 1977 by Prime Minister Indira Gandhi of the Indian National Congress (R). They included the conservative Indian National Congress (Organisation), the Hindu-nationalist Bharatiya Jana Sangh, the liberal to social-democratic Bharatiya Lok Dal (formed in 1974 by the merger of the conservative-liberal Swatantra Party, the conservative Bharatiya Kranti Dal, the Samyukta Socialist Party and the Utkal Congress) and the Socialist Party, as well as later defectors from the Indian National Congress.

Raj Narain, a Socialist, had filed a legal writ alleging electoral malpractice against Indira Gandhi in 1971. On 12 June 1975, Allahabad High Court found her guilty of using corrupt electoral practices in her 1971 election victory over Narain in the Rae Bareli constituency. She was barred from contesting any election for the next six years. Economic problems, corruption and the conviction of Gandhi led to widespread protests against the government, which responded by imposing a State of Emergency. The rationale was that of preserving national security. However, the government introduced press censorship, postponed elections and banned strikes and rallies. Opposition leaders such as Narain, J. B. Kripalani, Jayaprakash Narayan, Anantram Jaiswal, Chandra Shekhar, Biju Patnaik, Atal Bihari Vajpayee, L. K. Advani, Satyendra Narayan Sinha, Ramnandan Mishra and Morarji Desai were imprisoned, along with thousands of other political activists. When the Emergency was lifted and a new election called in 1977, opposition leaders joined to form the JP. In the 1977 general election, the party defeated the Congress (R) and JP leader Morarji Desai became the first non-Congress prime minister in independent modern India's history. Narain defeated Gandhi at Rae Bareli in that election. The new JP-led government reversed many Emergency-era decrees and opened official investigations into Emergency-era abuses. Although several major foreign policy and economic reforms were attempted, continuous in-fighting and ideological differences made the Janata government unable to effectively address national problems. In July 1979 Desai was forced to resign and was replaced by Charan Singh. Popular disenchantment with the political infighting and ineffective government led to the resurgence of Gandhi and her new Indian National Congress (I) party.

JP's success was short-lived and, in the 1980 general election, the Congress (I) was returned to power. JP's heterogeneous nature led to its fragmentation. The first major split occurred in July 1979 when Narain formed his own social-democratic Janata Party (Secular). Shortly after the 1980 election, Hindu nationalists regrouped in the Bharatiya Janata Party, meant as a successor to the Bharatiya Jana Sangh. In 1980 the Janata Party (Secular) was merged into the Lokdal, which would finally merge into the larger Janata Dal, which led the government in 1989–1991 and later experienced a fragmentation similar to JP's. Direct or indirect spliter parties of the Janata Dal, some of which regional, have included the socialist Samata Party, the Samajwadi Janata Party (Rashtriya) or Janata Dal (Socialist), the Janata Dal (United), the Janata Dal (Secular), the socialist Samajwadi Party, the Rashtriya Janata Dal, the Biju Janata Dal and the Rashtriya Lok Dal.

== National units ==
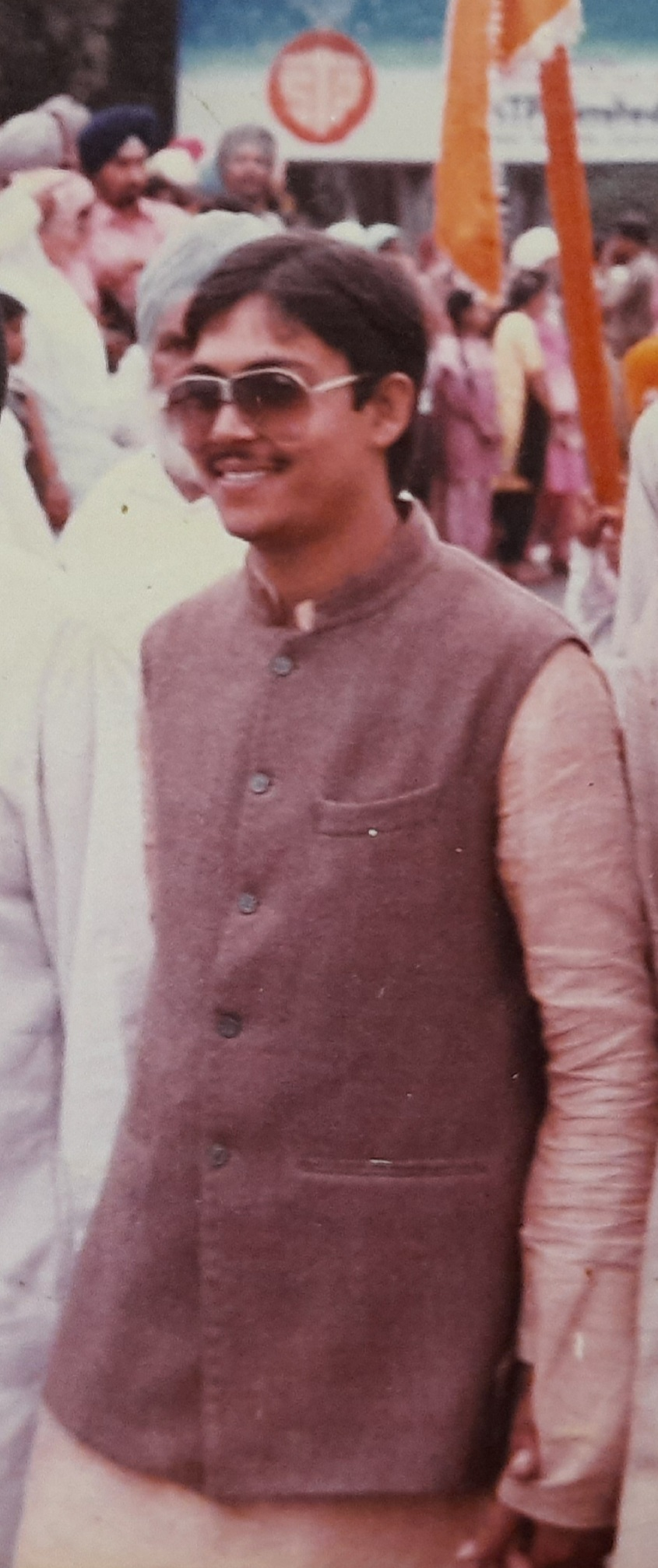
Thakur Ji Pathak

Thakur Ji Pathak (January 1982–20 January 1985) Before Thakur Ji Pathak was in Janata party.

== History ==
Having led the Indian independence movement, the Indian National Congress became the most popular political party in independent India and won every election following national independence in 1947. However, the Indian National Congress bifurcated in 1969 over the issue of the leadership of Indira Gandhi, the daughter of India's first prime minister Jawaharlal Nehru. Supporters of Indira Gandhi claimed to be the real Congress party, adopting the name Indian National Congress (R) – where "R" stood for "Requisition." Congress politicians who opposed Indira identified themselves as the Indian National Congress (O) – where "O" stood for "Organisation" or "Old." For the 1971 election, the Congress (O), Samyukta Socialist Party and the Bharatiya Jana Sangh had formed a coalition called the "Grand Alliance" to oppose Indira Gandhi and the Congress (R), but failed to have an impact; Indira's Congress (R) won a large majority in the 1971 elections and her popularity increased significantly after India's victory in the war of 1971 against Pakistan.

However Indira's subsequent inability to address serious issues such as unemployment, poverty, inflation and shortages eroded her popularity. The frequent invoking of "President's rule" to dismiss state governments led by opposition political parties was seen as authoritarian and opportunist. Political leaders such as Jayaprakash Narayan, Acharya Kripalani and Congress (O) chief Morarji Desai condemned Indira's government as dictatorial and corrupt. Narayan and Desai founded the Janata Morcha (People's Front), the predecessor of what would become the Janata party. The Janata Morcha won the elections for the Vidhan Sabha (State Legislature) of the state of Gujarat on 11 June 1975.

Raj Narain, a leader of the Socialist Party (India), who had unsuccessfully contested election against Indira from the constituency of Rae Bareilly in 1971, lodged a case at the Allahabad High Court, alleging electoral malpractices and the use of government resources for her election campaign. On 12 June 1975 in State of Uttar Pradesh v. Raj Narain, the Allahabad High Court found Indira guilty and barred her from holding public office for six years. Opposition politicians immediately demanded her resignation and stepped up mass protests against the government. On 25 June, Narayan and Desai held a massive rally in Delhi, calling for a "Satyagraha" – a campaign of non-violent civil disobedience to force the government to resign.

== Emergency ==
On 25 June 1975, the president of India, Fakhruddin Ali Ahmed, accepted prime minister Indira Gandhi's recommendation to declare a state of national emergency. Indira argued that the political and civil disorder constituted a threat to national security. A state of emergency enabled the central government to issue executive decrees without requiring the consent of Parliament. Elections were postponed and public gatherings, rallies and strikes were banned. Curfews were imposed and police forces were empowered to make warrantless searches, seizures and arrests. Indira's government imposed "President's rule" in the states of Tamil Nadu and Gujarat, dismissing the governments controlled by opposition political parties. The central government also imposed censorship on radio, television and newspapers. Across the country, police forces arrested thousands of opposition political activists, as well as leaders such as Raj Narain, Jayaprakash Narayan, Jivatram Kripalani, Anantram Jaiswal, Kamaraj, Morarji Desai, Satyendra Narayan Sinha, Vijaya Raje Scindia, Charan Singh, Atal Bihari Vajpayee, Lal Krishna Advani and others. Opposition political organisations such as the Hindu nationalist Rashtriya Swayamsevak Sangh (RSS) and the Communist Party of India (Marxist) were banned and their leaders arrested. Only the Communist Party of India supported the state of emergency. Due to the advancing age and failing health, Narayan was released from prison, but remained prohibited from political activity.

During the Emergency, Indira Gandhi implemented a 20-point program of economic reforms that resulted in greater economic growth, aided by the absence of strikes and trade union conflicts. Encouraged by these positive signs and distorted and biased information from her party supporters, Indira called elections for May 1977. However, the emergency era had been widely unpopular. The most controversial issue was the 42nd amendment to the Constitution of India, which deprived citizens of direct access to the Supreme Court, except when violation of the fundamental rights resulted from Union law. The Parliament was given unrestrained power to amend any parts of the Constitution. The Supreme Court was given exclusive jurisdiction as regards determination of the constitutional validity of laws passed by the Union government. It restricted the power of the courts to issue stay orders or injunctions. Almost all parts of the Constitution saw changes through this amendment. The clampdown on civil liberties and allegations of widespread abuse of human rights by police had angered the public. Indira Gandhi was believed, by the public at large to be under the influence of a clique of politicians led by her youngest son, Sanjay Gandhi, who had become notorious for using his influence in the government and the Congress party for alleged corrupt activities. Sanjay Gandhi had masterminded the Union government's unpopular campaign of family planning, which had allegedly involved forcible sterilisation of young men by government officials. Sanjay Gandhi had also instigated the demolition of slums in the Jama Masjid area of New Delhi, the national capital, which left thousands of people, mostly Muslims, homeless. Indian laborers, urban workers, teachers and government employees were also disenchanted by wage freezes and the curtailing of trade union activities and rights.

== Creation ==
Calling elections on 18 January 1977 the government released political prisoners and weakened restrictions and censorship on the press, although the state of emergency was not officially ended. When opposition leaders sought the support of Jayaprakash Narayan for the forthcoming election, Narayan insisted that all opposition parties form a united front. The Janata Party was officially launched on 23 January 1977 when the Janata Morcha, Charan Singh's Bharatiya Lok Dal, Swatantra Party, the Socialist Party of India of Raj Narain and George Fernandes, and the Bharatiya Jana Sangh (BJS) joined, dissolving their separate identities (the merger of all party organisations was to be completed after the election). Although the political ideologies of Janata constituents were diverse and conflicting, the party was able to unite under the over-reaching appeal of Jayaprakash Narayan, who had been seen as the ideological leader of the anti-Emergency movement and now the Janata party. Chandra Shekhar became first president of Janata Party. Ramakrishna Hegde became the party general secretary, and Bharatiya Jana Sangh politician Lal Krishna Advani became the party spokesperson.

The Janata manifesto was released on 10 February, which declared that the coming election presented voters with:

a choice between freedom and slavery; between democracy and dictatorship; between abdicating the power of the people and asserting it; between the Gandhian path and the way that has led many nations down the precipice of dictatorship, instability, military adventure and national ruin.

As it became clear that Indira's Emergency rule had been widely unpopular, defections from the Congress (R) government increased. The most significant was that of Jagjivan Ram, who commanded great support amongst India's Dalit communities. A former Minister of Defence, Ram left the Congress (R) and along with his supporters formed the Congress for Democracy on 2 February 1977. Other co-founders included the former Chief Minister of Orissa Nandini Satpathy, former Union Minister of State for Finance K. R. Ganesh, former MP D. N. Tiwari and Bihar politician Raj Mangal Pandey.

Although committing to contest the election with the Janata party, Ram resisted merging his party organisation with Janata. It was ultimately decided that the Congress for Democracy would contest the election with the same manifesto as the Janata party and would join the Janata party in Parliament, but would otherwise retain a separate identity (the CFD would merge with the Janata party after the elections on 5 May). On 30 January 1977 the Communist Party of India (Marxist) announced that it would seek to avoid a splintering in the opposition vote by not running candidates against the Janata party.

=== Constituent parties ===
- Indian National Congress (Organisation), formed in 1969 from a split of the Indian National Congress
- Bharatiya Jana Sangh
- Bharatiya Lok Dal, formed in 1974 by the merger of:
  - Swatantra Party
  - Bharatiya Kranti Dal
  - Samyukta Socialist Party
  - Utkal Congress
- Socialist Party, including:
  - Praja Socialist Party
- Splinters from the Indian National Congress (R), including Chandra Shekhar, Krishan Kant, Ram Dhan, Mohan Dharia, Chandrajit Yadav, Lakshmi Kanth
- Congress for Democracy, merged into JP in 1977

== 1977 elections ==
During the election campaign, the leaders of the Congress (R) and the Janata party traveled across the country to rally supporters. Indira and her Congress (R) promoted the record of achieving economic development and orderly government. Although she offered apologies for abuses committed during the Emergency, Indira and the Congress (R) defended the rationale of imposing the state of emergency as being essential for national security. On the other hand, Janata leaders assailed Indira for ruling as a dictator and endangering human rights and democracy in India. Janata's campaign evoked memories of India's freedom struggle against British rule, during which Jayaprakash Narayan, Jivatram Kripalani and Morarji Desai had first emerged as political leaders. Although Narayan and Kripalani did not seek office themselves, they became the leading campaigners for the Janata party, drawing great masses of people in rallies across the country.

Actions taken during Emergency significantly diminished support for the Congress (R) amongst its most loyal constituencies. The bulldozing of slums near the Jama Masjid was widely unpopular amongst India's Muslims, and the defection of Jagjivan Ram significantly diminished support for the Congress (R) amongst India's Dalits. BLD leader Charan Singh's peasant roots helped him raise considerable support in the rural parts of Uttar Pradesh, the most populous state of India. The Shiromani Akali Dal, the party of the Sikhs of Punjab and regional political parties such as the Tamil Nadu-based Dravida Munnetra Kazhagam became important allies. The leaders of the Hindu nationalist Bharatiya Jana Sangh rallied India's middle-class merchants, traders and conservative Hindus. The Hindu nationalist RSS and trade unions aligned with Janata helped rally considerable voting blocs.

The 1977 election drew a turnout of 60% from an electorate of more than 320 million. On 23 March, it was announced that the Janata party had won a sweeping victory, securing 43.2% of the popular vote and 271 seats. With the support of the Akali Dal and the Congress for Democracy, it had amassed a two-thirds, or absolute majority of 345 seats. Although the Congress for Democracy won 28 seats, Ram's standing as a national Dalit leader and moving a significant share of the Dalit vote to the Janata party and its allies won him considerable influence.

In contrast to the rest of the country, the Janata party won only six seats from India's southern states – none from the state of Kerala – where the Emergency had not caused political unrest. The Congress (R) won a total of 153 seats, mainly from India's south. However, Janata candidates resoundingly defeated Congress (R) candidates in the northern "Hindi belt", especially in Uttar Pradesh. One of the most shocking outcomes of the election was the defeat of Indira Gandhi in her bid to seek re-election from her constituency of Rae Bareilly, which she lost to her 1971 opponent Raj Narain by a margin of 55,200 votes. The Congress (R) did not win any seats in Uttar Pradesh and was wiped out in 10 states and territories by Janata candidates.

Summary of the 1977 March Lok Sabha election results of India, using alliances under Morarji Government from 1977 to 1979
Sources: Keesing's – World News Archive

| Alliances | Party | Seats won | Change | Popular votes % |
|---|---|---|---|---|
| Janata alliance Seats: 345; Seat Change: +233; Popular vote %: 51.89 | Janata Party / Congress for Democracy | 298 | +245 | 43.17 |

== Government formation ==
On the morning of 24 March, Jayaprakash Narayan and Jivatram Kripalani led the newly elected Janata MPs to Raj Ghat, where the ashes of Mahatma Gandhi were laid, and administered a pledge to continue Gandhi's work and preserve honesty in serving the nation. Immediately afterwards, the Janata party faced a serious challenge in choosing a leader to become India's new prime minister, where the rival bids of party leaders could divide the party and weaken its majority before it took power. Janata party chairman Morarji Desai, Charan Singh and Jagjivan Ram enjoyed the support of a significant number of Janata MPs and the activists brought from their own political parties into the Janata organisation. To avoid a potentially divisive contest, Janata leaders asked Jayaprakash Narayan and Jivatram Kripalani to select the party's leader, pledging to abide by their choice. After a period of deliberation, Narayan and Kripalani selected Morarji Desai to become the chairman of the Janata Parliamentary Party on 24 May. Although some leaders such as George Fernandes and Jagjivan Ram hesitated to support Desai and criticised the undemocratic method of selection, Desai's position was soon confirmed and consolidated.

Taking office as prime minister, Desai also took charge of the Ministry of Finance. He sought to carefully distribute important posts to satisfy Janata's different constituents and the most powerful party leaders who were rivals for his own position of leadership. Charan Singh became the Minister of Home Affairs, the second-most important position in the Council of Ministers, while Jagjivan Ram took charge of the Ministry of Defence. BJS leaders Atal Bihari Vajpayee and Lal Krishna Advani were respectively given charge of the Ministry of External Affairs and the Ministry of Information and Broadcasting. Raj Narain was appointed Minister of Health, Madhu Dandavate was to head the Ministry of Railways and trade unionist George Fernandes was made the Ministry of Communications. Jurist Shanti Bhushan was appointed Minister of Law and Justice. Congress (O) veteran and Janata candidate Neelam Sanjiva Reddy won the presidential election to become the 6th President of India on 25 July 1977.

The results of its election defeat considerably weakened and diminished the Congress (R). Significant numbers of Congress (R) MPs and activists condemned Indira's leadership and left the party. As a result, MPs still loyal to Indira Gandhi renamed their party to Congress (I) – "I" standing for Indira. Although no longer an MP, Indira Gandhi continued as the president of Congress (I), which remained the largest opposition party.

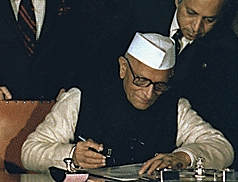
Indian prime minister Morarji Desai (1977–1979)

== Janata rule ==
The first actions taken by the Desai government were to formally end the state of emergency and media censorship and repeal the controversial executive decrees issued during the Emergency. The Constitution was amended to make it more difficult for any future government to declare a state of emergency; fundamental freedoms and the independence of India's judiciary was reaffirmed.

The new government also proceeded to withdraw all charges against the 25 accused in the Baroda dynamite case, which included the new Minister of Industry, George Fernandes. The Minister of Railways reinstated the railway employees disciplined after the May 1974 strike. The Desai government proceeded to establish inquiry commissions and tribunals to investigate allegations of corruption and Indira Gandhi's government, political party and the police forces. Specific inquiries were instituted on Sanjay Gandhi's management of the state-owned Maruti Udyog Ltd., the activities of the former Minister of Defence Bansi Lal and the 1971 Nagarwala scandal. Both Indira and her son Sanjay were charged with allegations of corruption and briefly arrested.

=== Elections in the states ===
Immediately upon taking office, the Janata government pressured the ten state governments where the Congress was in power to dissolve the state assemblies and hold fresh elections in June. Tamil Nadu witnessed the massive victory of the AIADMK, led by M. G. Ramachandran. Home Minister Charan Singh argued that the ruling party had been resoundingly rejected by voters and would need to win a new mandate from the people of the states. The Congress (R) was defeated in all the states, and the Janata party took power in seven – Uttar Pradesh, Bihar, Haryana, Orissa, Madhya Pradesh, Rajasthan and Himachal Pradesh. In Punjab, the Janata party formed a coalition government with the Akali Dal. In Bihar, Karpuri Thakur won the closely contested Janata legislature party leadership from the then Bihar Janata Party chief Satyendra Narayan Sinha to become the Bihar Chief Minister. The number of Janata members of the legislative assemblies (MLAs) of all the states increased from 386 to 1,246 seats. The government also called fresh elections in the state of Jammu and Kashmir, where the Janata party won 13 seats to the Congress's 11, and the veteran Kashmiri politician Sheikh Abdullah returned to power after having been dismissed in 1953.

=== Foreign policy ===
Prime Minister Morarji Desai and the Minister of External Affairs Atal Bihari Vajpayee began significant changes in India's foreign policy, moving away from the course adopted by Indira's government. Both Pakistan and China had celebrated the ouster of Indira Gandhi, who had preserved a hardline stance against India's rival neighbors. In 1979, Atal Bihari Vajpayee became the highest-ranking Indian official to visit Beijing, meeting China's leaders. The Desai government re-established diplomatic relations with the People's Republic of China, which had been severed due to the Sino-Indian War of 1962. Both nations established regular dialogue to resolve long-standing territorial disputes, expand trade and enhance border security. The Desai government ended India's support for the guerrillas loyal to Sheikh Mujibur Rahman, the founding leader of Bangladesh, who had been assassinated in 1975 by military officers and replaced by a military regime that sought to distance itself from India.

India also sought to improve relations with the United States, which had been strained due to the latter's support for Pakistan during the 1971 war and India's subsequent proximity with the Soviet Union. The Janata government announced its desire to achieve "genuine" non-alignment in the Cold War, which had been the long-standing national policy. In 1978, Jimmy Carter became the third U.S. president to make an official visit to India. Both nations sought to improve trade and expand cooperation in science and technology. Vajpayee represented India at the U.N. conference on nuclear disarmament, defending India's nuclear programme and its refusal to sign non-proliferation treaties.

=== Economic policy ===
The Janata government had lesser success in achieving economic reforms. It launched the Sixth Five-Year Plan, aiming to boost agricultural production and rural industries. Seeking to promote economic self-reliance and indigenous industries, the government required multi-national corporations to go into partnership with Indian corporations. The policy proved controversial, diminishing foreign investment and led to the high-profile exit of corporations such as Coca-Cola and IBM from India.

== List of Chief Ministers ==
| No | Portrait | Name | Constituency | State | Term of office | | Tenure length | Assembly |
|---|---|---|---|---|---|---|---|---|
| 1 | | Prem Khandu Thungan | Dirang Kalaktang | Arunachal Pradesh | 13 August 1975 | 18 September 1979 | 4 years, 36 days | 1st (1978 election) |
| 2 | | Babubhai Patel | Sabarmati | Gujarat | 11 April 1977 | 17 February 1980 | 2 years, 312 days | 5th (1975 election) |
| 3 | | Devi Lal | Bhattu Kalan | Haryana | 21 June 1977 | 28 June 1979 | 2 years, 7 days | 5th (1977 election) |
| 4 | | Shanta Kumar | Sullah | Himachal Pradesh | 22 June 1977 | 14 February 1980 | 2 years, 237 days | 4th (1977 election) |
| 5 | | Bhairon Singh Shekhawat | Chhabra | Rajasthan | 22 June 1977 | 16 February 1980 | 2 years, 239 days | 6th (1977 election) |
| 6 | | Ram Naresh Yadav | Nidhauli Kalan | Uttar Pradesh | 23 June 1977 | 28 February 1979 | 1 year, 250 days | 7th (1977 election) |
| 7 | | Karpoori Thakur | Phulparas | Bihar | 24 June 1977 | 21 April 1979 | 1 year, 301 days | 7th (1977 election) |
| 8 | | Kailash Chandra Joshi | Bagli | Madhya Pradesh | 24 June 1977 | 18 January 1978 | 208 days | 6th (1977 election) |
| 9 | | Nilamani Routray | Basudevpur | Odisha | 26 June 1977 | 17 February 1980 | 2 years, 236 days | 7th (1977 election) |
| 10 | | Yangmaso Shaiza | Ukhrul | Manipur | 29 June 1977 | 13 November 1979 | 2 years, 137 days | 3rd (1974 election) |
| 11 | | Radhika Ranjan Gupta | Fatikroy | Tripura | 26 July 1977 | 4 November 1977 | 101 days | 3rd (1972 election) |
| 12 | | Virendra Kumar Sakhlecha | Jawad | Madhya Pradesh | 18 January 1978 | 20 January 1980 | 2 years, 2 days | 6th (1977 election) |
| 13 | | Golap Borbora | Tinsukia | Assam | 12 March 1978 | 4 September 1979 | 1 year, 176 days | 6th (1978 election) |
| 14 | | Banarasi Das | Hapur | Uttar Pradesh | 28 February 1979 | 17 February 1980 | 354 days | 7th (1977 election) |
| 15 | | Ram Sundar Das | Sonepur | Bihar | 21 April 1979 | 17 February 1980 | 302 days | 7th (1977 election) |
| 16 | | Bhajan Lal Bishnoi | Adampur | Haryana | 28 June 1979 | 23 May 1982 | 2 years, 329 days | 5th (1977 elections) |
| 17 | | Jogendra Nath Hazarika | Duliajan | Assam | 9 September 1979 | 11 December 1979 | 93 days | 6th (1978 election) |
| 18 | | Sunderlal Patwa | Mandsaur | Madhya Pradesh | 20 January 1980 | 17 February 1980 | 28 days | 6th (1977 election) |
| 19 | | Ramakrishna Hegde | Kanakpura | Karnataka | 10 January 1983 | 7 March 1985 | 5 years, 216 days | 7th (1983 election) |
| 19 | | Ramakrishna Hegde | Basavanagudi | Karnataka | 8 March 1985 | 13 August 1988 | 5 years, 216 days | 8th (1985 election) |
| 20 | | S. R. Bommai | Hubli Rural | Karnataka | 13 August 1988 | 21 April 1989 | 281 days | 8th (1985 election) |

== Fall of the government ==
Despite a strong start, the Janata government began to wither as significant ideological and political divisions emerged. The party consisted of veteran socialists, trade unionists and pro-business leaders, making major economic reforms difficult to achieve without triggering a public divide. Socialists and secular Janata politicians shared an aversion to the Hindu nationalist agenda of the Rashtriya Swayamsevak Sangh, whose members included Vajpayee, Advani and other leaders from the former Bharatiya Jana Sangh. Violence between Hindus and Muslims led to further confrontations within the Janata party, with most Janata leaders demanding that Atal Bihari Vajpayee and Lal Krishna Advani choose between staying in government and being members of the RSS. Both Vajpayee and Advani as well as other members of the former BJS opted to remain members of the RSS and consequently resigned from their posts and from the party.

The decline in the popularity of the Janata government was aided by the stalled prosecution of Emergency-era abuses. The government had failed to prove most of the allegations and obtained few convictions. Cases against Indira Gandhi had also stalled for lack of evidence, and her continued prosecution began to evoke sympathy for her from the Indian public and anger of her supporters, who saw it as a "witch hunt."

In June 1978, Raj Narain attacked party president Chandra Shekhar and Bharatiya Jana Sangh. On 16 June 1978, Charan Singh announced his resignation from Janata Party parliamentary board. Janata Party parliamentary board which met on 22 June 1978 issued show-cause notices to Raj Narain, Devi Lal, Ram Dhan, Jabbar Singh and Sibhan Lal Saxena. On 1 July 1978, Charan Singh resigned from the cabinet of Morarji Desai because of growing differences between them over trial of Indira Gandhi. On 24 January 1979, Charan Singh returned into cabinet and held portfolios of Minister of Finance and becoming Deputy Prime Minister. Hirubhai M. Patel was shifted from Finance ministry to Home Ministry.

Through 1979, support for Morarji Desai had declined considerably due to worsening economic conditions as well as the emergence of allegations of nepotism and corruption involving members of his family. Desai's confrontational attitude eroded his support. His main rival Charan Singh had developed an acrimonious relationship with Desai. Protesting Desai's leadership, Singh resigned and withdrew the support of his Bharatiya Lok Dal. Desai also lost the support of the secular and socialist politicians in the party, who saw him as favoring the Hindu nationalist Bharatiya Jana Sangh. On 19 July 1979 Desai resigned from the government and eventually retired to his home in Mumbai (then Bombay). The failing health of Jayaprakash Narayan made it hard for him to remain politically active and act as a unifying influence, and his death in 1979 deprived the party of its most popular leader. Dissidents projected Charan Singh as the new prime minister in place of Desai.

President Neelam Sanjiva Reddy appointed Charan Singh as the Prime Minister of a minority government on the strength of 64 MPs, calling upon him to form a new government and prove his majority. The departure of Desai and the BJS had considerably diminished Janata's majority, and numerous Janata MPs refused to support Charan Singh. MPs loyal to Jagjivan Ram withdrew themselves from the Janata party. Former allies such as the DMK, Shiromani Akali Dal and the Communist Party of India (Marxist) had distanced themselves from the Janata party. Desperately seeking enough support for a majority, Charan Singh even sought to negotiate with Congress (I), which refused. After only three weeks in office, Charan Singh resigned. With no other political party in position to establish a majority government, President Reddy dissolved the Parliament and called fresh elections for January 1980.

In 1980 general elections, Janata Party declared Jagjivan Ram as its Prime Ministerial candidate, but the party won only 31 seats out of 542.

== Party Presidents ==
- Chandra Shekhar (1977–1988)
- Ajit Singh (1988–1990)
- Subramanian Swamy (1990–2013)
- Jai Prakash Bandhu (2013- 2021)
- Navneet Chaturvedi (2021–Present)

== General election results ==
=== Lok Sabha seats ===
| Year | Legislature | Seats contested | Seats won | Change in seats | Percentage of votes | Vote swing | Ref. |
|---|---|---|---|---|---|---|---|
| 1977 | 6th Lok Sabha | 405 | 295 / 542 | ▲295 | 41.32% | ▲41.32% | |
| 1980 | 7th Lok Sabha | 433 | 31 / 529 | ▼264 | 18.97% | ▼22.35% | |
| 1984 | 8th Lok Sabha | 207 | 10 / 514 | ▼21 | 6.89% | ▼12.08% | |
| 1989 | 9th Lok Sabha | 155 | 0 / 529 | ▼10 | 1.01% | ▼5.88% | |
| 1991 | 10th Lok Sabha | 349 | 5 / 521 | ▲5 | 3.37% | ▲2.36% | |
| 1996 | 11th Lok Sabha | 101 | 0 / 543 | ▼5 | 0.19% | ▼3.18% | |
| 1998 | 12th Lok Sabha | 16 | 1 / 543 | ▲1 | 0.12% | ▼0.07% | |
| 1999 | 13th Lok Sabha | 26 | 0 / 543 | ▼1 | 0.05% | ▼0.07% | |

== State units ==
=== Karnataka ===
==== Presidents ====
Veerendra Patil (1977–78)

H. D. Deve Gowda (1978)

D. Manjunath (1983)

M. P. Prakash (1987)

==== Secretary General ====
Jeevaraj Alva (1988–1990)

=== Uttar Pradesh ===
Anantram Jaiswal

=== Tamil Nadu ===
==== President ====
Nellai R. Jebamani

== Status ==
In the run-up to the 1980 elections, the remaining Janata party leaders tried unsuccessfully to rebuild the party and make fresh alliances. Desai campaigned for the party but did not himself stand for election, preferring retirement from politics. The Congress (I) capitalised on the aversion of the Indian public to another fragile and dysfunctional government by campaigning on the slogan "Elect A Government That Works!" Indira Gandhi apologised for mistakes made during the Emergency and won the endorsement of respected national leaders such as Vinoba Bhave. At the polls, the candidates running under the Janata ticket were resoundingly defeated – the party lost 172 seats, winning only 31. Indira Gandhi and the Congress (I) returned to power with a strong majority. Sanjay Gandhi was also elected to the Parliament. President Reddy was succeeded at the end of his term in 1982 by Congress (I) leader Zail Singh.(RUPPS).

Between 1980 and 1989, the Janata party maintained a small presence in the Indian Parliament under the leadership of socialist politician Chandra Sekhar. In 1988, Lok Dal (A) was merged into Janata Party and Ajit Singh was made its president. After some months, it merged into the Janata Dal, which had emerged as the chief opposition party under the leadership of Vishwanath Pratap Singh and the main constituent of the National Front coalition. Singh had become widely popular for exposing the role of the government of prime minister Rajiv Gandhi, the eldest son and successor of Indira, in the Bofors scandal, though on 5 February 2004, the Delhi High Court quashed the charges of bribery against Rajiv Gandhi and others.

But some leaders of Janata Party refused to accept its merger into Janata Dal and continued in Janata Party. These included Indubhai Patel, Subramanian Swamy, Syed Shahabuddin, H. D. Deve Gowda, Sarojini Mahishi. On 4 January 1989, Indubhai Patel was declared as acting president of Janata Party. Janata Dal filed an application to Election Commission of India to seek the transfer of Janata Party symbol to its own. But the Election Commission froze the symbol chakra–haldhar for 1989 general election and as a result, Janata Dal had to use wheel as their election symbol. Janata Party continue to retain its status as unrecognised registered party with Election Commission of India and retains its symbol of chakra-haldhar. Since the original Janata Party disappeared when it merged into the Janata Dal, these two(the 1977 one and present one) are considered as distinct from one another by many.
Under V. P. Singh, the Janata Dal and the National Front sought to replicate the Janata-style alliance of anti-Congress political parties. Although it failed to win a majority, it managed to form a fragile coalition government with V.P. Singh as the prime minister with the outside support of the BJP and the Communist Party of India (Marxist). However, Singh's government soon fell victim to intra-party rivalries and power struggles, and his successor Chandra Sekhar's Janata Dal (Socialist) government lasted barely into 1991.

== Legacy ==
Although its tenure in office was tumultuous and unsuccessful, the Janata party played a definitive role in Indian politics and history and its legacy remains strong in contemporary India. The Janata party led a popular movement to restore civil liberties, evoking the memories and principles of the Indian independence movement. Its success in ending 30 years of uninterrupted Congress rule helped strengthen India's multi-party democracy. The term "Janata" has been used by several major political parties such as the Biju Janata Dal (BJD), Bharatiya Janata Party (BJP), Janata Dal (United), Janata Dal (Secular), Rashtriya Janata Dal and others.

Participants in the struggle against the Indian Emergency (1975–77) and of the Janata party went on to comprise a new generation of Indian political leaders. Chandra Shekhar, Atal Bihari Vajpayee and Deve Gowda went on to serve as Prime Ministers; Vajpayee led the first non-Congress government to complete a full five-year term from 1999 to 2004. Lal Krishna Advani served as deputy prime minister. Younger politicians such as Subramanian Swamy, Arun Jaitley, Pramod Mahajan, Sushma Swaraj and others were grass-roots activists in the Janata party.

The Janata Party continued to exist led by Subramanian Swamy, which maintained a small presence in the politics of the state of Tamil Nadu, Karnataka, Andhra Pradesh, Kerala, Maharashtra, Chandigarh, Delhi and at the national stage. Janata party continued its lead as opposition in AP until the formation of TDP party.

== Merger with All India Progressive Janata Dal ==
On March 14, 2003, the Janata Party of Subramanian Swamy merged with AIJD. Swamy was appointed chairman of the political affairs committee of the party.

Vijay Mallya and Swamy later left AIPJD to reconstitute the Janata Party.

== See also ==
- Congress for Democracy
- Janata Party (Secular)

== Bibliography ==
- Shourie, Arun (1980). Institutions in the Janata phase. Bombay: Popular.
- Thakur, Janadan (1978). All the Janata Men. Vikas Publishing. ISBN 9780706906448.
