= Gujarat Pradesh Congress Committee =

- President: Amit Chavda
- Chairman: Tushar Chaudhary
- Headquarters: Rajiv Gandhi Bhawan, Ahmedabad - 380006, Gujarat
- Youth wing: Gujarat Youth Congress
- Women's wing: Gujarat Pradesh Mahila Congress Committee
- Ideology: Populism; Social liberalism; Social democracy; Secularism
- Political position: Centre
- ECI status: A State Unit of Indian National Congress
- Alliance: Indian National Developmental Inclusive Alliance
- Seats in Rajya Sabha: 0 / 11
- Seats in Lok Sabha: 1 / 26
- Seats in Gujarat Legislative Assembly: 12 / 182

Election symbol

Website
- INC Gujarat

The Gujarat Pradesh Congress Committee (Gujarat PCC) is the state unit of the Indian National Congress in Gujarat. It is responsible for organizing and coordinating the party's activities and campaigns within the state, as well as selecting candidates for local, state, and national elections. Shaktisinh Gohil was the president of the Committee, from 9 June 2023 till 23 June 2025, when he resigned taking the moral responsibility for the defeat of the party's candidates in the by-polls to Kadi and Visavadar Assembly constituencies. The GPCC has 1,862 seats in various urban and rural local bodies in Gujarat. Its office is located at Rajiv Gandhi Bhawan, Ahmedabad. It is the single major opposition party against the Bharatiya Janata Party in Gujarat. It has participated in every Gujarat Legislative Assembly election since 1962, the first election in the independent state.

== History ==
=== Pre-independence ===
It was formed in 1920 and its first and longest running president was Sardar Vallabhbhai Patel. The GPCC would organize Indian nationalist campaigns during the Indian freedom struggle, and after independence in 1947, it became responsible for supplying candidates of the Congress in local and state election campaigns.

=== Post-independence ===
The party contested its first elections in independent Gujarat in 1962, under the leadership of Jivran Mehta, who won with a strong majority of 113 seats. The party lost a number of seats in 1967, under the leadership of Hitendra Desai, albeit still had a simple majority. However, soon after the election Hitendra Desai defected to the Indian National Congress (Organisation) camp and formed the government with the party. In 1971, president's rule was declared and continued up to the 1972 election. The Congress swept the 1972 election under Ghanshyam Oza, winning 140 of the then-168 seats in the Gujarat Legislative Assembly. In 1973, Chimanbhai Patel replaced Oza as chief minister. The Chimanbai Patel government was dissolved following popular protests against the government as a part of the Navnirman Andolan in 1973-74, against economic crises and corruption in public life. The protests were successful and resulted in the dissolution of the government in 1974. President's rule was established until the next elections. In 1975, the Congress performed badly in the newly-held elections, winning only 75 out of 182 seats. The opposition parties formed the government under Bahubhai J. Patel of the INC(O). However, president's rule was declared in 1976 with Congress forming the government. This government lasted for only 3 months with the Janata Party, the new opposition bloc forming the government again. In 1980 the Congress stormed back to power with over 140 seats under Madhav Solanki. Madhav Solanki's government was extremely popular, and his government returned to power with a bigger majority in 1985. In 1990, the Congress got its lowest tally of seats in the Gujarat assembly ever, at 33. It was badly routed by the BJP-Janata Dal coalition. The Congress however came back to power in 1994. In the 1995 elections, the Congress again lost extremely bad, albeit performed better than the last election, with the BJP securing a huge majority of 121 seats. The Congress continued to perform relatively dismally in various Gujarat elections until 2015, when the Congress stormed into power in many rural local bodies of Gujarat, wiping out the BJP. The Congress also finally managed to make a major breakthrough in the 2017 Gujarat Legislative elections, reducing the number of BJP seats to 99, although it still lost the election by a few seats. However, in the 2022 election, the Congress suffered its biggest rout, as it got its lowest tally of seats in the Gujarat assembly ever, at 17. It was badly routed by the BJP which won the biggest ever victory at 156 seats and even won more than 52% of the popular vote. Congress could not even get enough seats to have a leader of opposition in the legislature. Congress was further routed in the 2026 Gujarat local elections.

== Office ==
Gujarat Pradesh Congress started functioning at Khamasa, Ahmedabad under leadership of Kantilal Ghiya, the first president. In 1971, it was shifted to Shahpur and then to Hawawala Blocks on Ashram Road, Ahmedabad. During 1977, it was again shifted to Khanpur, which till recently was Ahmedabad City Congress Committee (INC DCC Office). Subsequently to Vikram Chambers on Ashram Road. Finally, the place where Rajiv Bhawan stands at present was handed over to Congress by Hitendrabhai Desai. Gujarat Pradesh Congress Committee is running from this premises, which was inaugurated on 28 December 2006 by Ahmedbhai Patel, Rajya Sabha MP.

=== Office bearers ===
Name	Wing/Position	Department	Ref(s)
Amit Chavda	State President	N/A	
Indravijaysinh Gohil, Jignesh Mevani, Kadir Pirzada, Lalit Kagaratha	Working Presidents	N/A	
Mukul Wasnik	State in-charge	N/A	
Gita ben Patel	State women's wing chief	Mahila gujarat congress	
Dr Manish Doshi	Main Stream	chief Spokesperson and convenor	
Manhar Patel	Main Stream	Spokesperson	
Juned Patel	Chairman	Minority Department Social Media	

== List of presidents ==
S.no	President	Portrait	Term	
1.	Amarsinh Chaudhary		2001	2002
2.	Shankarsinh Vaghela		2002	2004
3.	B. K. Gadhvi		2004	2005
4.	Bharatsinh Madhavsinh Solanki		2006	2008
5.	Siddharth Patel		2008	2011
6.	Arjun Modhwadia		2011	2015
(4).	Bharatsinh Madhavsinh Solanki		2015	March 2018
7.	Amit Chavda		March 2018	6 December 2021
8.	Jagdish Thakor		6 December 2021	9 June 2023
9.	Shaktisinh Gohil		9 June 2023	17 July 2025
(7).	Amit Chavda		17 July 2025	Incumbent

== Electoral performance ==
=== Legislative Assembly elections ===
Year	Seats contested	Seats won	Change in seats	Percentage of votes	Vote swing	Outcome
1962	154	113 / 154	▲113	50.84	N/A	Government
1967	168	93 / 168	▼20	45.96	▼4.88	Government, later opposition
1972	168	140 / 168	▲47	50.93	▲4.97	Government
1975	182	75 / 182	▼65	40.70	▼10.23	Opposition, briefly back in govt and later in oppn again
1980	182	141 / 182	▲66	51.04	▲10.34	Government
1985	182	149 / 182	▲9	55.55	▲4.51	Government
1990	182	33 / 182	▼116	30.74	▼24.81	Opposition, later government
1995	182	45 / 182	▲12	32.86	▲2.12	Opposition, later government
1998	182	53 / 182	▲8	34.85	▲1.99	Opposition
2002	182	51 / 182	▼2	39.28	▲4.43	Opposition
2007	173	59 / 182	▲8	38.00	▼1.28	Opposition
2012	176	61 / 182	▲2	38.93	▲0.93	Opposition
2017	179	77 / 182	▲16	41.44	▲2.57	Opposition
2022	179	17 / 182	▼60	27.22	▼14.12	Opposition

=== Lok Sabha elections ===
Year	Legislature	Seats won	Change in seats	Percentage of votes	Vote swing	Outcome
1962	3rd Lok Sabha	16 / 22	N/A	N/A	N/A	Government
1967	4th Lok Sabha	11 / 24	▼5	N/A	N/A	Government
1971	5th Lok Sabha	11 / 24	Steady	N/A	N/A	Government
1977	6th Lok Sabha	10 / 26	▼1	N/A	N/A	Opposition
1980	7th Lok Sabha	25 / 26	▲15	N/A	N/A	Government
1984	8th Lok Sabha	24 / 26	▼1	N/A	N/A	Government
1989	9th Lok Sabha	3 / 26	▼21	N/A	N/A	Opposition
1991	10th Lok Sabha	5 / 26	▲2	N/A	N/A	Government
1996	11th Lok Sabha	10 / 26	▲5	N/A	N/A	Opposition, later outside support for UF
1998	12th Lok Sabha	7 / 26	▼3	N/A	N/A	Opposition
1999	13th Lok Sabha	6 / 26	▼1	N/A	N/A	Opposition
2004	14th Lok Sabha	12 / 26	▲6	N/A	N/A	Government
2009	15th Lok Sabha	11 / 26	▼1	N/A	N/A	Government
2014	16th Lok Sabha	0 / 26	▼11	32.9	N/A	Opposition
2019	17th Lok Sabha	0 / 26	Steady	32.11	▼0.79	Opposition
2024	18th Lok Sabha	1 / 26	▲1	31.24	▼0.87	Opposition

== List of Disrict Congress Committee- Presidents ==
S.No	DCC	President
1	Amhedabad City	Sonal patel
2	Ahmedabad Rural	Rajesh Kumar Gohil
3	Amreli	Pratap Dhuddhat
4	Anand	Alpesh Padiyar
5	Aravalli	Armubhai Patel
6	Banaskantha	Gulab Singh Rajput
7	Bharuch	Rajendrasingh Rana
8	Bhavnagar Rural	Pravinbhai Rathore
9	Bhavanagar City	Manohar Sinh 'Lalbha'
10	Botad	Himmat Kataria
11	Chhota Udaipur	Shashikant Rathwa
12	Dahod	Harshadbhai Ninama
13	Dang	Snehil Thakre
14	Devbhoomi Dwarka	Palbhai Ambaliya
15	Gandhi Nagar	Arvind Sinh Solanki
16	Gandhi Nagar City	Shakti Patel
17	Gir Somnath	Punjabhai Vansh
18	Jamnagar City	Virendrasinh Jadeja alias Diggubhai
19	Jamnagar Rural	Manoj Kathiria
20	Junagadh City	Manoj Joshi
21	Kheda	Kalush Dabhi
22	Kutch	V.K. Humbal
23	Mahisagar	Harshad Shantilal
24	Mahesana	Baldevji Thakor
25	Morbi	Kishorebhai Chikhalia
26	Narmada	Ranjitsinh Tadvi
27	Navasari	Shaileshbhai Patel
28	Panchmahal	Chetansinh Parmar
29	Patan	Ghembharbhai Patel
30	Porbandar	Rambhai Maru
31	Rajkot City	Radeepsinh Jadeja
32	Rajkot Rural	Hitesh M Vohra
33	Sabarkantha	Rambhai Solanki
34	Surat Rural	Anand Chaudhari
35	Surat City	Vipul Babubhai Udhnawala
36	Surendranagar	Naushad Solanki
37	Tapi	Vaibhavkumar Chhitubhai Gamit
38	Vadodara Rural	Jaspalsinh Padihar
39	Vadodara City	Ritvik Joshi
40	Valsad	Kishanbhai B Patel

== See also ==
- Indian National Congress
- Congress Working Committee
- All India Congress Committee
- Pradesh Congress Committee
- All India Mahila Congress
