= List of deputy chief ministers of Gujarat =

Cabinet position in the Government of Gujarat

Deputy Chief Minister of Gujarat
- Emblem of Gujarat

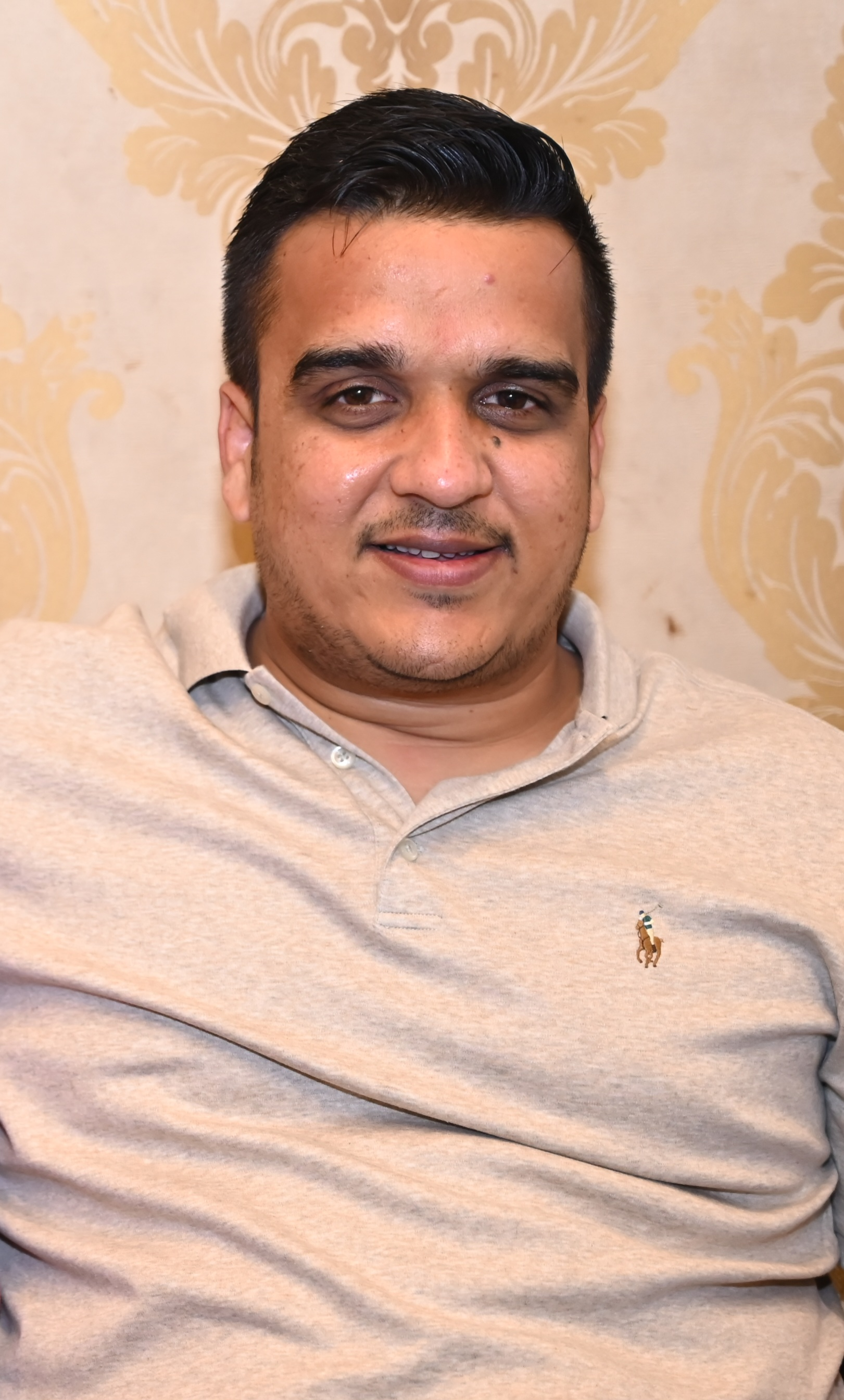
- Incumbent; Harsh Sanghavi since 17 October 2025
- Style: The Honourable
- Status: Deputy Head of Government
- Abbreviation: DCM
- Member of: Gujarat Legislative Assembly; Cabinet
- Nominator: Chief Minister of Gujarat
- Appointer: Governor of Gujarat
- Term length: At the confidence of the assembly; 5 years and is subject to no term limits
- Inaugural holder: Chimanbhai Patel ( 17 March 1972 - 17 July 1973)
- Formation: 1 May 1960 (66 years ago)

The deputy chief minister of Gujarat is a position of the Cabinet in the Government of Gujarat. BJP leader and politician Harsh Sanghavi is serving as the incumbent deputy chief minister of Gujarat since 17 October 2025.The position of deputy chief minister is not explicitly defined or mentioned in the Constitution of India. However, the Supreme Court of India has stated that the appointment of deputy chief ministers is not unconstitutional. The court has clarified that a deputy chief minister, for all practical purposes, remains a minister in the council of ministers headed by the chief minister and does not draw a higher salary or perks compared to other ministers.During the absence of the chief minister, the deputy-chief minister may chair cabinet meetings and lead the assembly majority. Various deputy chief ministers have also taken the oath of secrecy in line with the one that chief minister takes. This oath has also sparked controversies.

== List ==
The list of deputy chief ministers in the Indian state of Gujarat include:

Keys: BJP INC

No	Portrait	Name	Constituency	Term of office			Assembly (election)	Political party	Chief Minister
1		Chimanbhai Patel	Sankheda	17 March 1972	17 July 1973	1 year, 122 days	1972 (4th)	Indian National Congress	Ghanshyam Oza
2		Kantilal Ghia	Rakhial	17 March 1972	17 July 1973	1 year, 122 days	1972 (4th)	Indian National Congress	Ghanshyam Oza
Vacant (17 July 1973 – 4 March 1990)
3		Keshubhai Patel	Tankara	4 March 1990	25 October 1990	235 days	1990 (8th)	Bharatiya Janata Party	Chimanbhai Patel
Vacant (25 October 1990 – 17 February 1994)
4		Narhari Amin	Sabarmati	17 February 1994	14 March 1995	1 year, 25 days	1990 (8th)	Indian National Congress	Chhabildas Mehta
Vacant (14 March 1995 – 7 August 2016)
5		Nitinbhai Patel	Mehsana	7 August 2016	11 September 2021	5 years, 35 days	2012 (13th), 2017 (14th)	Bharatiya Janata Party	Vijay Rupani
Vacant (11 September 2021 – 17 October 2025)
6		Harsh Sanghavi	Majura	17 October 2025	Incumbent	1 year, 3 days	2022 (15th)	Bharatiya Janata Party	Bhupendrabhai Patel

== Statistics ==
List of deputy chief ministers by length of term

No.	Name	Party	Length of term	
No.	Name	Party	Longest continuous term	Total years of deputy chief ministership
1	Nitinbhai Patel	BJP	5 years, 35 days	5 years, 35 days
2	Chimanbhai Patel	INC	1 year, 122 days	1 year, 122 days
3	Kantilal Ghia	INC	1 year, 122 days	1 year, 122 days
4	Narhari Amin	INC	1 year, 25 days	1 year, 25 days
5	Harsh Sanghavi	BJP	1 year, 3 days	1 year, 3 days
6	Keshubhai Patel	BJP	235 days	235 days

== Oath as the state deputy chief minister ==
The deputy chief minister serves five years in the office. The following is the oath of the Deputy chief minister of state:

I, <Name of Deputy Chief Minister>, do swear in the name of God/solemnly affirm that I will bear true faith and allegiance to the Constitution of India as by law established, that I will uphold the sovereignty and integrity of India, that I will faithfully and conscientiously discharge my duties as a Minister for the State of () and that I will do right to all manner of people in accordance with the Constitution and the law without fear or favour, affection or ill-will.

Oath of Secrecy

"I, [Name], do swear in the name of God / solemnly affirm that I will not directly or indirectly communicate or reveal to any person or persons any matter which shall be brought under my consideration or shall become known to me as a Minister for the State of [Name of State] except as may be required for the due discharge of my duties as such Minister.". A. Oath of Office (પદના શપથ) "Ahu, [Potanu Naam], Ishwarna naame sogandh lau chu / dhradhbhaavthi pratijna karu chu ke, hu kayda dwara sthapit Bharatna Samvidhaan pratye sachi shraddha ane nishtha dharavish. Hu Bharatna saarvabhoumatva ane akhandatano svikaar karish ane tena rrakshan maate cutibaddh rahesh. Hu [Gujarat] rajyana Mukhya Mantri tarike mara kartavyo vafaadaari-purvak ane antahkaran-purvak nibhavish. Ane hu bhay ane pakshpaat vagar, raag ane dvesh vagar, badha j loko sathe Samvidhaan ane kayda mujab nyayik varatan karish." B. Oath of Secrecy (ગુપ્તતાના શપથ) "Ahu, [Potanu Naam], Ishwarna naame sogandh lau chu / dhradhbhaavthi pratijna karu chu ke, [Gujarat] rajyana Mukhya Mantri tarike mara vichar maate lavama aavela athva mane jaanva malela koipan babatne, hu pratyaksh ke paroksh rite koipan vyaktine janavish nahi athva teni same pragat nahi karu, nirdharit kartavyona yogya palan maate jetlu jaruri hoy te sivay."
