= Khedbrahma Assembly constituency =

Legislative Assembly constituency in Gujarat State, India

Coordinates: 24.03°N 73.04°E

Khedbrahma
- Constituency No. 29 for the Gujarat Legislative Assembly

Constituency details
- Country: India
- Region: Western India
- State: Gujarat
- District: Sabarkantha
- Lok Sabha constituency: Sabarkantha
- Established: 1962
- Total electors: 284,148
- Reservation: ST

Member of Legislative Assembly
- 15th Gujarat Legislative Assembly
- Incumbent Dr.Tushar Amarsinh Chaudhary
- Party: Indian National Congress
- Elected year: 2022

Khedbrahma is one of the 182 Legislative Assembly constituencies of Gujarat state in India. It is part of Sabarkantha district and is reserved for candidates belonging to the Scheduled Tribes.

This assembly seat represents the following segments,

1. Khedbrahma Taluka
2. Vijaynagar Taluka

== Members of the Legislative Assembly ==
Year	Member	Image	Party
1962	Maljibhai Sangrambhai Dabhi		Indian National Congress
1967	Jethabhai Rathod		Swatantra Party
1972	Maljibhai Sangrambhai Dabhi		Indian National Congress
1975	Khatubhai Kaudoji Katara		Indian National Congress
1980	Jagdishchandraji Doljibhai Damor		Indian National Congress (I)
1985	Kaljibhai Ratnaji Katara		Indian National Congress
1990	Becharbhai Khatuji Bara		Bharatiya Janata Party
1995	Amarsinh Chaudhary		Indian National Congress
1998	Amarsinh Chaudhary		Indian National Congress
2002	Amarsinh Chaudhary		Indian National Congress
2007	Ashvinbhai Laxmanbhai Kotwal		Indian National Congress
2012	Ashvinbhai Laxmanbhai Kotwal		Indian National Congress
2017	Ashvinbhai Laxmanbhai Kotwal		Indian National Congress
2022	Dr.Tushar Amarsinh Chaudhary		Indian National Congress

== Election results ==
=== 2022 ===
2022 Gujarat Legislative Assembly election: Khedbrahma
Party	Candidate	Votes	%	±%
INC	Tushar Amarsinh Chaudhary	67,349	32.67	
BJP	Ashvin Kotwal	65,685	31.86	
AAP	Bipinchandra Rupasibhai Gameti	55,590	26.96	
NOTA	None of the above	7,331	3.56	
Majority		1,664	0.81	
Turnout				
Registered electors		2,82,875		
INC hold		Swing		

=== 2017 ===
Gujarat Legislative Assembly Election, 2017: Khedbrahma
Party	Candidate	Votes	%	±%
INC	Ashwin Kotwal	85,916	47.89	−11.39
BJP	Ramilaben Bara	74,785	41.69	+16
Majority		11,131	6.2	−27.39
Turnout		1,79,403	75.96	+0.2
Registered electors		236,186		
INC hold		Swing		

=== 2012 ===
Gujarat Assembly Election, 2012
Party	Candidate	Votes	%	±%
INC	Ashwin Kotval	88,488	59.28	
BJP	Ramabhai Solanki	38,351	25.69	
Majority		50,137	33.59	
Turnout		149,268	75.76	
INC hold		Swing		

2004 by election

● Bara Ramilaben Bahecharbhai (BJP) : 44,600 Votes : 43.51%

● Gameti Vaishaliben Suryakantbhai (INC) : 44,006 Votes : 42.93%

● Rathod Savitaben Dineshbhai (IND) : 8,745 Votes : 8.53%

● Parmar Kantibhai Anabhai (BSP) : 5,165 Votes : 5.04%

=== 1995 ===
- Amarsinh Bhilabhai Chaudhari (INC) : 59,822 votes
- Bara, Becharbhai Khatuji (BJP) : 33,310

== See also ==
- List of constituencies of the Gujarat Legislative Assembly
- Sabarkantha district
