= Chimanbhai =

Chimanbhai is a given name. Notable people with the name include:

- Chimanbhai Patel (1929–1994), Indian politician
- Chimanbhai Mehta (1925–2010), Indian politician
- Chinubhai Chimanbhai (1901–1993), former mayor of Ahmedabad
- Urmilaben Chimanbhai Patel, Indian politician
