= Vadod =

Vadod may refer to the following places in Gujarat state, western India:

- Vadod, Kathiawar, a village on Saurashtra peninsula
- Vadod State, a former Rajput princely state in Gohelwar prant, with seat in the above town
- a village in Anand Taluka in Anand District
- a village in Choryasi Taluka in Surat District
- a village in Daskroi Taluka in Amdavad District
