= Amit Chavda =

Politician from Gujarat, India

President Gujarat Pradesh Congress Committee
- Incumbent
- Assumed office 17 July 2025
- Preceded by: Shaktisinh Gohil
- In office 2018–2021
- Preceded by: Bharatsinh Solanki
- Succeeded by: Jagdish Thakor

Leader, Congress Legislative Party, Gujarat
- In office 17 January 2023 – 17 July 2025
- Preceded by: Sukhram Rathva
- Succeeded by: Tushar Chaudhary

Member of Gujarat Legislative Assembly
- Incumbent
- Assumed office 20 December 2012
- Constituency: Anklav

Personal details
- Born: 24 April 1976 (age 50) Keshavnagar, Gujarat, India
- Party: Indian National Congress
- Education: Chemical Engineer
- Website: https://amitchavda.in/

Amit Chavda is an Indian politician from the state of Gujarat, India. He belongs to the ⁣⁣Indian National Congress and is also a member of the Gujarat Legislative Assembly elected from Anklav assembly constituency.

== Political career ==
Amit Chavda was born in Anklav, Anand district, and since the early days of his life, he has been active in political and social activities. He was active in NSUI and later in Indian Youth Congress. In 2004 and 2007, he got elected to Gujarat Assembly from Borsad assembly constituency, and in 2012, 2017, and 2022 from Anklav assembly constituency. He was appointed Gujarat Pradesh Congress Committee president in 2018. He was one of the youngest presidents of Gujarat Pradesh Congress Committee. In 2023, he was appointed Congress legislative party leader for Gujarat.

== Positions held ==
- MLA from Borsad Constituency in 2004
- MLA from Borsad Constituency in 2007
- MLA from Anklav Constituency in 2012
- MLA from Anklav Constituency in 2017
- Updandak, CLP, Gujarat Legislative Assembly 2012–2017.
- Dandak, CLP, Gujarat Legislative Assembly 2017.
- Appointed members in various committees of Gujarat assembly, like OBC, Estimate, PSUs, etc.

=== Party posts ===
- President, Anand District Youth Congress (1999 to 2004).
- Pradesh Delegate, Gujarat Pradesh Congress Committee.
- Executive Member, Gujarat Pradesh Congress Committee.
- Worked as Coordinator Central Zone with AICC Secretary, Assembly Election-2017.
- President, Gujarat Pradesh Congress Committee (2018–2021)
- Currently serving as Congress Legislative Party (CLP) leader in Gujarat Legislative Assembly

== Social & Cooperative Sectors ==
- Secretary - Roshtriya Kelvani Mandal, Borsad.

It runs various Aashram Shala, Uttar Buniyadi Schools, Girls Schools, Gram Vidhyapith, Industrial Training Institute and Computer Centres.

- Secretary - Rashtriya Vidhyarthi Sahayak Mandal, Borsad.

It provides all study materials and hostels to the students and also runs various educational programs.

- President - Jivan Chetna Kelvani Trust, Vadodara.

This trust runs various balwadi, Primary, Secondary and Higher Secondary Schools.

- Managing Trustee - Navsarjan Education and Charitable Trust, Vadodara.

The trust is involved in various youth development, environment and health awareness programs.

- Chairman, APMC Anklav (3rd Term).
- Director, KDCC Bank, Nadiad (3rd Term).
- Director, Anand District Co-Operative Sangh (3rd Term).
- Director, Anklav, Kharid Vechan Sangh.
- Director, Gujarat State Co-Operative Bank Ltd., Ahmedabad.

== Awards ==
- Awarded as Adarsh Yuva Vidhayak by the 61 Bhartiya Chhatra Sansad, Pune.
