= Jethabhai Rathod =

Indian politician (died 2023)

Jethabhai Bhurabhai Rathod
- જેઠાભાઈ ભુરાભાઈ રાઠોડ

Member of the Gujarat Legislative Assembly
- In office 1967–1971
- Preceded by: Maljibhai Sangrambhai Dabhi
- Succeeded by: Maljibhai Sangrambhai Dabhi
- Constituency: Khedbrahma

Personal details
- Born: 1936/1937
- Died: 12 May 2023 (aged 86) Tebda, Sabarkantha district, Gujarat, India
- Party: Swatantra Party
- Spouse: Shardaben
- Children: 5 sons, 4 daughters

Jethabhai Bhurabhai Rathod (1936/1937 – 12 May 2023) was an Indian politician from Gujarat state who had served as the member of the Gujarat Legislative Assembly representing Khedbrahma from 1967 to 1971.

== Career ==
Rathod contested Taluka Panchayat election in 1967 and lost by only 195 votes.

As a candidate of the Swatantra Party, he defeated the Indian National Congress candidate in the 1967 Gujarat Legislative Assembly election. He had campaigned on a bicycle in the election. He served as the member of the Gujarat Legislative Assembly representing Khedbrahma from 1967 to 1971.

Rathod used to go by the state transport bus to attend the Assembly. He lived in the poverty for rest of his life and held Below Poverty Line card for the government assistance. He did not receive any pension.

After a month of age related illness, he died on 12 May 2023 in Tebda village at age of 86. His body was cremated next day on the bank of Sabarmati River near his village. His funeral was attended by Tushar Amarsinh Chaudhary, an incumbent legislative assembly member from Khedbrahma, and other local politicians.

== Personal life ==
Rathod lived in Tebda village in Poshina Taluka of Sabarkantha district in Gujarat. He married Shardaben and another lady. He had five sons and four daughters.
