= Shailesh Sotta =

Indian politician

Shaileshbhai Mehta, popular as Shailesh Sotta, (born 1960) is an Indian politician from Gujarat. He is a member of the Gujarat Legislative Assembly from Dabhoi Assembly constituency in Vadodara district. He won the 2022 Gujarat Legislative Assembly election representing the Bharatiya Janata Party.

== Early life and education ==
Mehta is from Vadodara, Gujarat. He is the son of Kanailal Mehta. He completed his diploma in mechanical engineering in 1981 at Maharaja Sayajirao University of Baroda, Vadodara. He is a businessman and realtor. He also runs a petrol bunk and his wife is also into family business.

== Career ==
Mehta won from Dabhoi Assembly constituency representing the Bharatiya Janata Party in the 2022 Gujarat Legislative Assembly election. He polled 88,846 votes and defeated his nearest rival, Balkrishnabhai Patel of the Indian National Congress, by a margin of 20,476 votes. He first became an MLA winning the 2017 Gujarat Legislative Assembly election defeating Siddharth Patel of the Indian National Congress by a margin of 2,839 votes.
