= Rasiklal =

Rasiklal is a given name. Notable people with the given name include:

- Rasiklal Parikh (1897–1982), Indian poet, playwright, literary critic, Indologist, historian and editor
- Rasiklal Umedchand Parikh (1910–1980), Indian independence activist and politician
