= Chimanbhai Patel =

Indian politician

5th Chief Minister of Gujarat
- In office 4 March 1990 – 17 February 1994
- Preceded by: Madhavsinh Solanki
- Succeeded by: Chhabildas Mehta
- In office 18 July 1973 – 9 February 1974
- Preceded by: Ghanshyam Oza
- Succeeded by: Babubhai Patel

1st Deputy Chief Minister of Gujarat
- In office 17 March 1972 – 17 July 1973 Serving with Kantilal Ghia
- Chief Minister: Ghanshyam Oza

Personal details
- Born: 3 June 1929 Sankheda, Bombay Presidency, British India
- Died: 17 February 1994 (aged 64) Ahmedabad, Gujarat, India
- Party: Janata Dal
- Other political affiliations: Indian National Congress
- Spouse: Urmila Patel
- Children: Siddharth Patel, Suhrud Patel, Sujata Patel

Chimanbhai Patel (3 June 1929 – 17 February 1994) was an Indian politician associated with Indian National Congress and Janata Dal, and a former Chief Minister of Gujarat state in India representing both those parties at various times. Patel is known as the founder of Kokam Theory which was initiated to counter the Kham Theory of Indian National Congress and it was very successful in Saurashtra and South Gujarat to achieve the huge support from Kolis which were 24% of the state population.

== Born and Education ==
He was born on 3 June 1929 in Chikodra village of Sankheda Tehsil in Vadodara district. He was elected the first president of student union of The Maharaja Sayajirao University of Baroda in Vadodara in 1950. He has completed his master's in economics from that Maharaja Sayajirao University of Baroda.

== Political career ==
He was elected to the Gujarat Legislative Assembly from Sankheda in 1967 and joined the Cabinet of Hitendra K Desai. He also became the minister in the Cabinet of Ghanshyam Oza. In 1972, he won again from Sankheda, and became Chief Minister later. In 1975 he lost from Jetpur himself, but his new party Kisan Mazdoor Lok Paksha won 11 seats and helped Babubhai Patel of Janata Morcha form government.

In 1990, he was elected to Gujarat Vidhan Sabha as a Janata Dal candidate from Unjha, and was appointed CM. In his early career, he was mentored by Dr. Jethalal K Parikh who was a known freedom fighter from the local town of Sankheda.

=== Chief Minister of gujarat ===
On 17 July 1973, he replaced Ghanshyam Oza as the Chief Minister of Gujarat. He served in that office till 9 February 1974. Chimanbhai Patel was forced out of office in 1974 by the Nav Nirman movement on charges of corruption. After being expelled from the party, he helped in the formation of Janata Morcha government in the leadership of Babubhai J Patel. He again became the chief minister on 4 March 1990 heading Janata Dal-Bharatiya Janata Party coalition government. On breaking of the coalition on 25 October 1990, he managed to retain his post with the help of 34 legislatures of Indian National Congress (INC). Later he joined INC and continued till his death on 17 February 1994.

He is the first Chief Minister who ushered in the development of ports of Gujarat, refineries, and power plants by private parties as part of his industrialization master plan of Gujarat. During his second term, he was the first Chief Minister of India to pass a bill for the ban of cow slaughter and all sale of meat on all Hindu and Jain festival days. He died in office on 17 February 1994, aged 65.

== Personal life ==
His wife Urmilaben Patel and his son Siddharth Patel were also politicians.

Preceded by Ghanshyambhai C. Oza	Chief Minister of Gujarat; 18 July 1973 – 9 February 1974	Succeeded by Shri Babubhai J. Patel
Preceded by Madhavsinh Solanki	Chief Minister of Gujarat; 4 March 1990 – 17 February 1994	Succeeded by Chhabildas Mehta
