= Urmilaben Chimanbhai Patel =

Indian politician

Member of Parliament, Rajya Sabha
- In office 1993–1999
- Constituency: Gujarat

Personal details
- Born: 5 March 1932
- Died: 21 April 2016 (aged 84)
- Party: Indian National Congress
- Spouse: Chimanbhai Patel

Urmilaben Chimanbhai Patel was an Indian politician. She was a Member of Parliament, representing Gujarat in the Rajya Sabha the upper house of India's Parliament as a member of the Indian National Congress.

She had served as the Minister of State for Power in Prime Minister P. V. Narsimha Rao cabinet during 1991-95.

She died on 21 April 2016 in Ahmedabad due to age-related health problems.

== Personal life ==
She was a wife of the Chief Minister of Gujarat Chimanbhai Patel.

Her son Siddharth Patel is a politician.
