= Bharatsinh Madhavsinh Solanki =

Indian politician

Bharatsinh Solanki
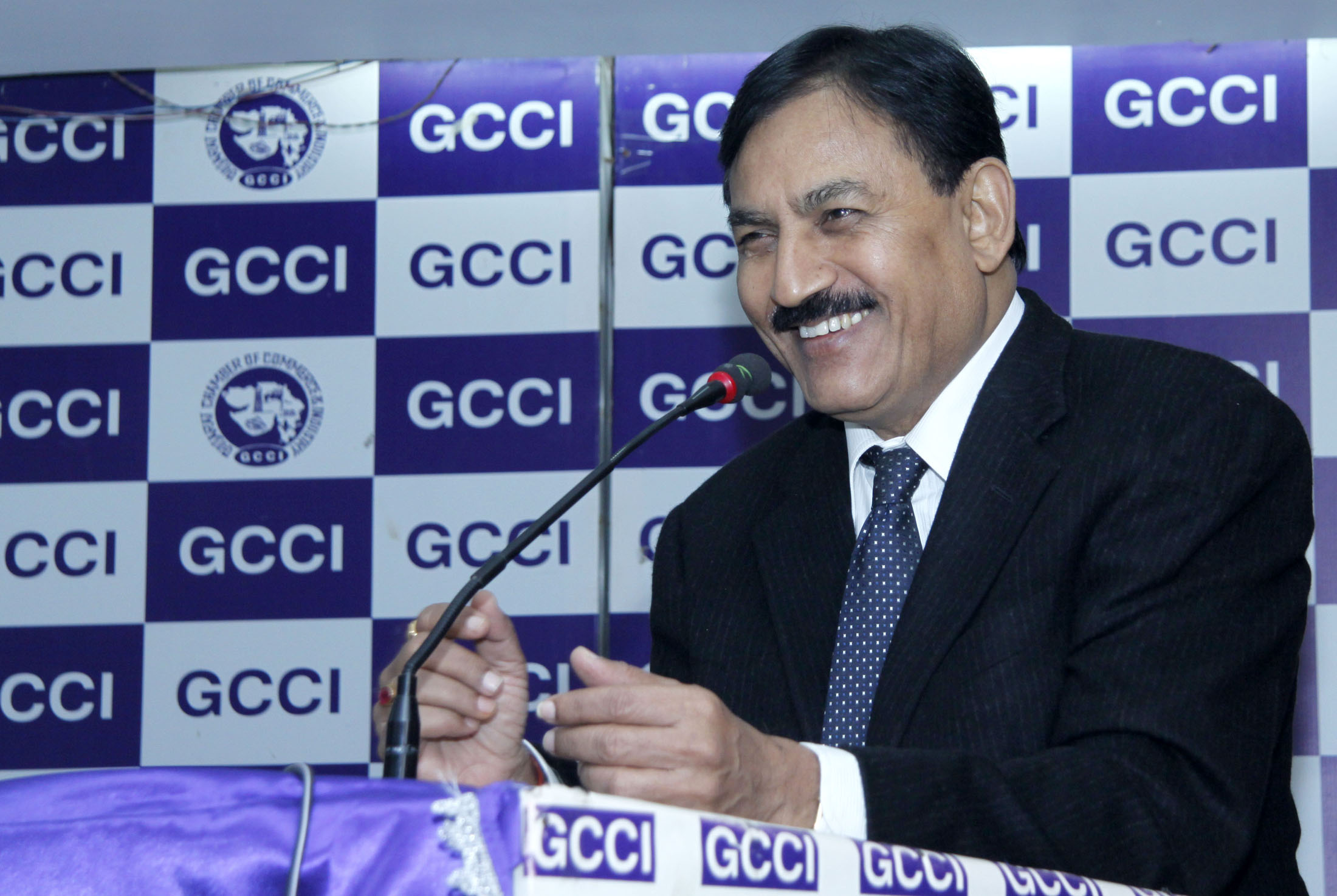

President Gujarat Pradesh Congress Committee
- In office 2015 – March 2018
- Preceded by: Arjun Modhwadia
- Succeeded by: Amit Chavda
- In office 2006–2008
- Preceded by: B. K. Gadhvi
- Succeeded by: Siddharth Patel

Union Minister of State for Drinking Water and Sanitation (Independent Charge)
- In office October 2012 – May 2014

Minister of State for Railways, Govt. of India
- In office January 2011 – October 2012

Minister of State for Power, Govt. of India
- In office June 2009 – January 2011

Member of Parliament Lok Sabha
- In office 2004–2014
- Constituency: Anand

AICC incharge of Jammu and Kashmir Pradesh Congress Committee
- In office 24 December 2023 – 14 February 2025
- Succeeded by: Syed Naseer Hussain

Personal details
- Born: 26 November 1953 (age 72) Borsad, Bombay State, India (now in Gujarat, India)
- Party: Indian National Congress
- Relations: Madhavsinh Solanki (father)
- Educational Qualification: B.E. (Civil)
- Special Interests: Youth affairs, Social Justice and Environment.
- Website: Official website

Bharatsinh Madhavsinh Solanki (born 26 November 1953) is an Indian politician and former president of Gujarat Pradesh Congress Committee. He was Minister of State for Union Minister of State for Drinking Water and Sanitation (Independent Charge) in the Government of India in the Second Manmohan Singh ministry till May 2014. His previous posts include that of Minister of State for Power. He has also served as Secretary at All India Congress Committee from 2004 to 2006. He was born to Madhavsinh Solanki of Gujarat.

After winning the election twice, in 2004 and 2009, he lost the Anand seat in the 2014 Indian general election to Dilipbhai Patel of BJP.

== Offices held ==
- 1992 – General Secretary (Gujarat Pradesh Congress Committee)
- 1995-2004 – Member, Gujarat Legislative Assembly (Three Terms)
- 2003-2004 – Deputy Leader of Opposition, Gujarat Legislative Assembly
- 2004-2014 – Member of Parliament
- 2004 – Secretary, A.I.C.C.
- 2006 -2008 – President, Gujarat Pradesh Congress Committee
- June 2009-January 2011, Union Minister of State of Power, Government of India
- January 2011-October 2012, Minister of State for Railways, Govt. of India
- October 2012 – May 2014, Minister of State for Drinking Water and Sanitation(Independent Charge), Govt. of India
- 2015-March 2018 – President, Gujarat Pradesh Congress Committee

He is a former member of the Press Council of India and has served on several committees, including the Joint Committee on Offices of Profit and the Committee on Public Undertaking.

== See also ==
- List of Koli people
