= U. N. Dhebar =

Indian politician (1905–1977)

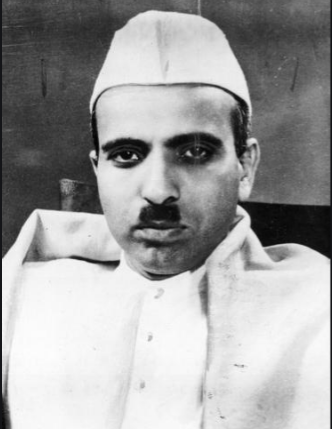

Chief Minister of Saurashtra
- In office 15 February 1948 – 19 December 1954
- Preceded by: Office Established
- Succeeded by: Rasiklal Umedchand Parikh

President of the Indian National Congress
- In office 1955–1959
- Preceded by: Jawaharlal Nehru
- Succeeded by: Indira Gandhi

Member of Parliament, Lok Sabha
- In office 1962–1967
- Preceded by: Khandubhai Kasanji Desai
- Succeeded by: Minoo Masani
- Constituency: Rajkot

Personal details
- Born: Uchharangrai Navalshankar Dhebar; 21 September 1905 Gangajala, Nawanagar State, British India
- Died: 11 March 1977 (aged 71)
- Party: Indian National Congress
- Occupation: Lawyer, politician

Uchharangrai Navalshankar Dhebar (21 September 1905 – 11 March 1977) was an Indian Independence activist who served as the Chief Minister of Saurashtra State from 1948 to 1954 and the President of the Indian National Congress from 1955 to 1959.

Between 1938 and 1942, Dhebar led the Rajkot Satyagraha and actively participated in the Individual Satyagraha and Confederation Movement. For his role in the Indian independence movement, he was imprisoned thrice by the British colonial government, for two short spells during 1938-1939 and 1941 and later for three years from 1942 to 1945. In 1959, Dhebar was the head of the Planning Sub-Committee of the All India Congress Committee and from 1960 to 1961, he was the Chairman of the Scheduled Castes and Scheduled Tribes Commission of the Government of India. In 1962, he was elected to the third Lok Sabha from Rajkot. In 1962, Dhebar was elected as the Chairman of the Khadi and Village Industries Commission of the Government of India. In 1973, he was awarded the Padma Vibhushan award, India's second-highest civilian honor.

== Early life ==
U.N. Dhebar was born on 21 September 1905 in the hamlet of Gangajala, eleven miles from Jamnagar. After his university education, he started a legal practice as a lawyer.

=== Entry to Politics ===
Under the influence of Mahatma Gandhi and in opposition to the Government of India Act 1935, Dhebar gave up his legal career to join the Indian independence movement in 1936 in his hometown, Rajkot, in the Kathiawar State in Western India. He became the President of the Viramgam Taluka Congress Committee. In February 1937, the State Government of Saurashtra issued an order for the banishment of 14 workers who were members of the executive committee. With the backing of the Indian National Congress, Dhebar led a movement which resulted in the withdrawal of the order of banishment after multiple protest meetings and protest processions.

Dhebar served as the President of the Rajkot Mill Kamdar Mandal in 1936, the Secretary of Kathiawar Political Conference in 1937–38, and as the President of Rajkot Praja Mandal in 1938–39. During the late thirties, he organized and spearheaded the struggle of the people of the former Kathiawar States for responsible government against the erstwhile princely rulers.

=== Arrests ===
==== Rajkot Satyagraha ====
Between 1938 and 1941, Dhebar led the Rajkot Satyagraha. Some of the reasons behind the populist struggle were the widespread public frustration against the princely ruler of Rajkot state's oppressive taxation regimes, restrictions on civil liberties such as freedom of speech, freedom to assemble, lack of access to education and other welfare services. Dhebar was sent to prison from 1938 to 1939 due to his active participation in the Rajkot Satyagraha.

Most of the princely states were autocratically ruled. While princely rulers engaged in a policy of high taxation, imposing a heavy economic burden on the populace, they did not spend sufficient tax revenues in the service of the public, leaving education and social services underdeveloped and civil rights restricted. Most of the state revenue that was earned by imposing heavy taxes on its citizens, was spent on the upkeep of the luxurious lifestyles led by the princely ruler. The princely rulers felt free to ignore the interests of the people and use state revenues to fund their luxurious lifestyles because the British provided immunity from domestic and external aggression. In return, the British government expected the states to support them in their imperialistic policies, thereby acting against the development of nationalist sentiments. The people under the British provinces in India were given some political rights and participation in the administration after the Government of India Acts of 1919 and 1935. However, the people under the princely states did not have rights equal to the rights enjoyed by those living in the British-administered provinces of India. The onset of the nationalistic movement against British rule also had an impact on the people of the princely states. Many revolutionary nationalists fleeing British authority came to the princely states in the first and second decades of the 20th century and initiated political activities there. Under the nationalist movement, the subjects of the princely states established people's organizations.

==== Individual Satyagraha and Confederation Movement ====
Many Indians felt that the involvement of India in World War II without the concurrence of its people was wrong. Those who protested this injustice across India on ethical and moral grounds were required by the Colonial Administration to affirm their status as conscientious objectors by reading a simple statement, which would then lead to their summary arrest. In January 1941, Dhebar joined the Individual Satyagraha and read such a statement of conscientious objection to India's involvement in the war, which led to his arrest. He was imprisoned for 6 months in the Sabarmati jail and came out of prison in June 1941.

After coming out of prison, Dhebar joined the Confederation Movement. The idea of the movement was to place smaller states under bigger states to attempt to impede the feared British strategy of merging the small princely states with British-administered India. According to the goals of the Confederation Movement, the identity of the small state would remain and the bigger state would be used for external relations. Dhebar engaged in this struggle from June 1941 to June 1947. During that period, however, he was arrested on 9 August 1942 on his return by train to Rajkot from Bombay, where he had gone to participate in the All India Congress Committee meeting. He was detained in the Rajkot prison until his release three years later on 31 August 1945.

== Saurashtra State ==
=== Formation of Saurashtra State ===
The Jam Joot Rachna was a rebellion against the Confederation Movement in which Jam Sahib, the main opponent in Saurashtra, amassed thousands of signatures in opposition to the confederation movement and claiming their right to determine their future. In 1946, with the help of Dhebar, this problem was resolved with the solution of a United Saurashtra.

In October 1947, the Nawab of Junagadh agreed to the integration of the State of Junagadh into Pakistan, despite widespread public opposition to it. Dhebar declared a total boycott of all goods going to and coming from Junagadh, outside Junagadh limits. The boycott was so effective that after being unable to sustain the economy for more than a month and half, the ruler of Junagadh went underground. Due to its success, the boycott method started being used by other smaller states, prompting intervention by the Indian government.

With the efforts led by Dhebar freeing the powerful Junagadh State from the grip of its autocratic ruler, the path towards a much larger confederation of states had become possible. As such, the Saurashtra State as a state in the Union of India was formed on 15 February 1948. Dhebar was appointed as the first Chief Minister of Saurashtra State on the same day.

=== Chief Minister of Saurashtra State ===
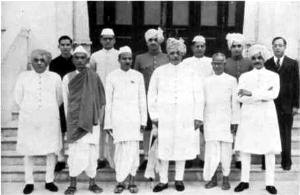
U. N. Dhebar (fourth from right), then Chief Minister with Council of rulers and ministers of Saurashtra Union

Before the establishment of the Saurashtra State, there had been a total of 202 princely and administrative states within Saurashtra. By 15 April 1948, all units of administration had been taken over by Saurashtra State. Soon after the state was established, riots in Saurashtra State led to two important reforms. The first reform accepted the right of the people to free assembly in very distinct terms, as well as the right of the people to approach the court in case of a dispute with the government. The second reform, regarded as the land reform, handed control of overseas customs, inland customs, railways, income tax, and armed forces to the Government of India.

After the formation of Saurashtra State, the next two years were spent on fixing integration problems within both the state and the country. The state-wide problems included political integration, administrative integration, organizing the financial structure, and reorganizing the tax structure, such as introducing and removing specific taxes. Country-wide integration included the transfer of the entire customs revenue of India to the Central Government.

During his tenure as the Chief Minister of Saurashtra State, Dhebar was held in high regard by his political colleagues and his constituents. The President of Saurashtra State opposed Dhebar to be elected as a member of the Constituent Assembly and instead wanted him to remain as the Chief Minister of Saurashtra. Moreover, during an issue between the large landowners and farmers, they both appealed to Dhebar to serve as an impartial arbitrator for their dispute.

== President of Indian National Congress ==
In November 1954, Dhebar was brought onto the national scene by Jawaharlal Nehru. After giving up his position as the Chief Minister of Saurashtra State and his membership of legislature, with Nehru's support, Dhebar was elected President of Indian National Congress for a four-year term from January 1955 to February 1959. His first act as the president was to assemble the top leaders of Congress to decide how they could best serve the nation. His goal was to not exclude the propertied class and to introduce large numbers of the producing classes to the INC, namely farmers, craftsmen, laborers, and students. He also created an unemployment dole which was equivalent to the amount of money spent on prisoners.

Until 1948, Dhebar's primary objective was the independence of India. Now, he modified this objective so that the means of production, distribution, and exchange should either be owned by the state or should be controlled by the state. However, the main purpose of the INC from 1955 to 1959 was to integrate both the man-power and resources of India for the general development of the country.

While President of the INC, Dhebar headed the Planning Committee until 1959. From his work in the Planning Committee Dhebar realized India's challenges would not be effectively addressed unless people themselves took the lead in reorienting their attitudes about others and problems with other individuals.

Dhebar was an avid supporter of the fight against apartheid in South Africa. Dhebar encouraged the South African Indian Congress to follow the steps of Mahatma Gandhi and India's fight to independence by applying the principles of non-violence and unity, not only amongst themselves but also with "your African brethren and all others". He also predicted that their work would "bring your peaceful struggle for elementary human rights to a successful end very soon".

At the end of his term, Dhebar tried convincing Jaya Prakash Narayan, J.B. Kripalani, Ashok Mehta, and other friends to take up the responsibility of creating an opposition party to the INC. This would have led to a reasonable constructive opposition party which could have taken the place of the INC. Unfortunately, this plan failed as Jaya Prakash Narayan did not agree.

== Post-Presidency ==
Dhebar served as the Chairman of Scheduled Areas and Scheduled Tribes Commission in 1960–61. As the chairman, Dhebar had to determine to what extent the Scheduled Tribes provisions of the Constitution were being implemented, to what extent they had made an impact upon tribals’ socio-economic position and their overall life. He was able to provide special protections to between 25 and 30 million Scheduled Tribe members. He led a tribal commission and gave a report which was generally accepted by all State governments.

In 1962, he was elected to the third Lok Sabha from Rajkot. Dhebar was connected with several institutions rendering social and educational services. In 1962, Dhebar was elected as the Chairman of the Khadi and Village Industries Commission of the Government of India. He was awarded the Padma Vibhushan, India's second-highest civilian honor, in 1973.

Dhebar died on 11 March 1977 at the age of 72.

== Views and Philanthropy ==
=== Attitude towards the British ===
Prior to Indian Independence, Dhebar had conflicting views on the British based on different encounters with members of the British army. Political agent Major C.W.L. Harvey was one individual who Dhebar thought was incredibly wise, as he helped Dhebar persuade the State to not withdraw the permission to hold a session of the Kathiawar Political Conference in Rajkot in 1937. However, Dhebar also saw many officers as narrow-minded and vindictive. While Dhebar was in prison, his wife died and the officers insisted that he must request and be granted parole to attend his wife's funeral.

=== Hindu-Muslim Harmony ===
Dhebar believed that the necessary means to resolving Hindu-Muslim tensions was to stop a few irresponsible leaders in both the Hindu and Muslim communities at proper times. He believed it was merely a law-and-order problem and that it was the responsibility of the State to be clear with the leadership in both communities. It was only when the State did not make a special effort to see that everybody fully enjoys equal rights, that the State lost the moral right to consider the issue as merely a law-and-order problem.

== Influences ==
Dhebar credited Tolstoy as the "real influence" on his life. First introduced to him by Gandhiji's nephew, he believed Tolstoy influenced him to work with the weapons of peace and non-violence. He also received his social awareness of responsibility and his methodology of work from Tolstoy.

=== Mahatma Gandhi ===
Gandhi was Dhebar's biggest influence, with many of his ideas and qualities coming from Gandhi's approach and philosophies. From giving up his legal career to joining politics to participating in multiple Satyagrahas, these major decisions on Dhebar's life had been heavily influenced by Gandhi.

Two things that stood out most to Dhebar about Gandhi's approach were his solution to the problem of poverty and the principle of trusteeship. Rather than capitalizing for political purposes on the problem of poverty, Gandhi employed some of the people. It did not give the person everything they want but it did give hope to the person that they are being looked after. He did not want large scale producers to think of setting up the industries in the spheres where the traditional sector was doing its bit, simply out of motives of profit.
