= Dabhoi Assembly constituency =

Legislative Assembly constituency in Gujarat State, India

Coordinates: 22.13°N 73.42°E

Dabhoi
- Constituency No. 140 for the Gujarat Legislative Assembly

Constituency details
- Country: India
- Region: Western India
- State: Gujarat
- District: Vadodara
- Lok Sabha constituency: Chhota Udaipur
- Total electors: 232,674
- Reservation: None

Member of Legislative Assembly
- 15th Gujarat Legislative Assembly
- Incumbent Shailesh Sotta
- Party: Bharatiya Janata Party
- Elected year: 2022

Dabhoi is one of the 182 Legislative Assembly constituencies of Gujarat state in India. It is part of Vadodara district.

== List of segments ==
This assembly seat represents the following segments:

1. Dabhoi Taluka
2. Vadodara Taluka (Part) Villages – Ankhol, Khatamba, Bhayli, Raypura, Gokalpura, Samiyala, Bil, Timbi, Dangiwada, Pansoli, Shankarpura, Jobantekri, Ratanpur, Vadadla, Talsat, Chapad, Maretha, Chikhodara, Alhadpura, Navapura, Tatarpura, Sultanpura, Diwalipura, Hetampura, Kelanpur, Dhaniyavi, Vora Gamdi, Mujar Gamdi, Alamgir, Khalipur, Varnama, Sundarpura, Shahpura, Hansajipura, Raghavpura, Samaspura, Patarveni, Rabhipura, Fatepura, Kajapur, Hansapura, Mastupur Gamdi, Kandkoi, Meghakui, Salad, Ajitpura, Dolatpura, Ramnath, Rasulpur, Runvad, Samsabad
3. Vadodara Taluka (Part) - Vadodara Municipal Corporation (Part) Ward No. – Kalali (OG) 18

== Members of Legislative Assembly ==
- 1998 - Siddharth Patel, Indian National Congress
- 2002 - Prof. Chandrakant Motibhai Patel, Bharatiya Janata Party
- 2007 - Siddharth Patel, Indian National Congress
- 2012 - Balkrushnabhai Patel, Bharatiya Janata Party

Year	Member	Picture	Party
2017	Mehta Shaileshbhai Kanaiyalal (Shailesh Sotta)		Bharatiya Janata Party
2022	Mehta Shaileshbhai Kanaiyalal (Shailesh Sotta)		Bharatiya Janata Party

== Election results ==
=== 2022 ===
Gujarat Assembly Election, 2022
Party	Candidate	Votes	%	±%
BJP	Shailesh Sotta	88,846	52.01	+3.55
INC	Balkrishnabhai Naranbhai Patel (Dholar)	68370	40.02	−6.67
AAP	Ajitsinh Parsottamdas Thakor	7911	4.63	New
Majority			11.99	
Turnout		170821		
BJP hold		Swing		

=== 2017 ===
Gujarat Assembly Election, 2017: Dabhoi
Party	Candidate	Votes	%	±%
BJP	Shailesh Sotta	77,945	48.46	
INC	Siddharth Patel	75,106	46.69	
Majority		2,839	1.77	
Turnout		1,60,857	79.68	
BJP hold		Swing		

=== 2012 ===
Gujarat Assembly Election, 2012
Party	Candidate	Votes	%	±%
BJP	Balkrushnabhai Patel	70833	49.20	
INC	Siddharth Patel	65711	45.64	
Majority		5122	3.56	
Turnout		143972	77.50	
BJP hold		Swing		

=== 2002 ===
Gujarat Assembly Election, 2002
Party	Candidate	Votes	%	±%
BJP	Prof. Chandrakant Motibhai Patel	48,305	52.99	
INC	Siddharth Patel	31,558	34.62	
Majority			18.37	
Turnout		91,169	69.87	
BJP gain from INC		Swing		

== See also ==
- List of constituencies of the Gujarat Legislative Assembly
- Vadodara district
- Gujarat Legislative Assembly
