= Chief Minister of Gujarat =

Leader of the executive branch of Government of Gujarat

- Gujarāt Mukhyamantri
- Emblem of Gujarat

- Flag of India

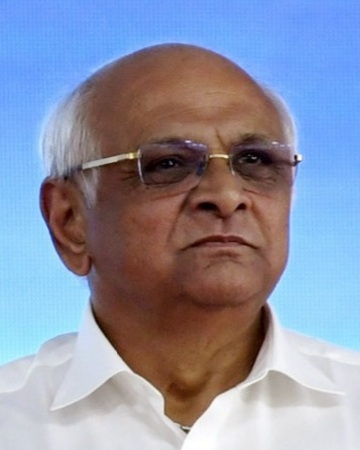
- Incumbent; Bhupendrabhai Patel since 13 September 2021
- Chief Minister's Office; Government of Gujarat
- Style: The Honourable
- Type: Leader of the Executive
- Status: Head of government
- Abbreviation: CMoGujarat
- Member of: Legislative Assembly; State Cabinet
- Reports to: Governor of Gujarat; Gujarat Legislative Assembly
- Residence: 26, Ministers' Enclave, Sector-20, Gandhinagar
- Seat: Gandhinagar
- Nominator: MLAs of the majority party or alliance
- Appointer: Governor of Gujarat
- Term length: 5 years subject to the confidence of the assembly; No term limits
- Inaugural holder: Jivraj Narayan Mehta
- Formation: 1 May 1960 (66 years ago)
- Deputy: Deputy Chief Minister of Gujarat
- Website: http://cmogujarat.gov.in/

The Chief Minister of Gujarat is the head of government of the Indian state of Gujarat. As per the Constitution of India, the governor of Gujarat is the state's de jure head, but de facto executive authority rests with the chief minister, a template applicable to all other Indian states. Following elections to the Gujarat Legislative Assembly, the governor usually invites the political party (or a coalition of political parties) with a majority of assembly seats to form the government in the state. The governor appoints the chief minister, whose council of ministers is collectively responsible to the assembly. Given that they have the confidence of the assembly, the chief minister's term is for five years, renewable, and is subject to no term limits.

The state of Gujarat was created on 1 May 1960, composed of the Gujarati-speaking districts of Bombay State. Jivraj Narayan Mehta of the Indian National Congress was the inaugural chief minister of the state. Narendra Modi of the Bharatiya Janata Party (BJP), whose term lasted for 12 years, 227 days from October 2001 to May 2014, has been the longest serving chief minister of the state. He resigned to become the 14th prime minister of India, and was succeeded by Anandiben Patel, who was the state's first woman chief minister. The incumbent chief minister is Bhupendrabhai Patel of the BJP since 13 September 2021.

== Predecessors ==
Following the Indian Independence in 1947, the province of Bombay was established from the erstwhile Bombay Presidency. The Bombay State was created in 1950 following the adoption of the Constitution of India which included parts of Baroda, Western India and Gujarat States Agency (part of present-day Gujarat). During the reorganisation of Indian states in 1956, the Saurashtra and Kutch States (part of present-day Gujarat) were added to Bombay State.

=== Prime Minister of Kathiawar/Saurashtra (1948-50) ===
No	Portrait	Name	Constituency	Term of office			Assembly (election)	Party
1		U. N. Dhebar		15 February 1948	26 January 1950	1 year, 345 days	Interim	Indian National Congress

=== Chief Minister of Saurashtra (1950-56) ===
No	Portrait	Name	Constituency	Term of office			Assembly (election)	Party
1		U. N. Dhebar		26 January 1950	19 December 1954	4 years, 327 days	Interim	Indian National Congress
1		U. N. Dhebar		26 January 1950	19 December 1954	4 years, 327 days	2nd (1952 election)	Indian National Congress
2		Rasiklal Parikh		19 December 1954	31 October 1956	1 year, 317 days	2nd (1952 election)	Indian National Congress

== Chief Ministers of Gujarat (1960-present) ==
The state of Gujarat was created on 1 May 1960, composed of the Gujarati-speaking districts of Bombay State following the Mahagujarat Movement.

No	Portrait	Name	Constituency	Term of office			Assembly (election)	Party (Note: This column only names the chief minister's party. The state government he heads may be a complex coalition of several parties and independents; these are not listed here.)
1		Jivraj Mehta	Amreli	1 May 1960	8 March 1962	3 years, 141 days	1st (1957 election)	Indian National Congress
1		Jivraj Mehta	Amreli	8 March 1962	19 September 1963	3 years, 141 days	2nd (1962 election)	Indian National Congress
2		Balwantrai Mehta	Bhavnagar	19 September 1963	19 September 1965	2 years, 0 days	2nd (1962 election)	Indian National Congress
3		Hitendra Desai	Olpad	19 September 1965	3 April 1967	5 years, 236 days	2nd (1962 election)	Indian National Congress
3		Hitendra Desai	Olpad	3 April 1967	12 November 1969	5 years, 236 days	3rd (1967 election)	Indian National Congress
3		Hitendra Desai	Olpad	12 November 1969	13 May 1971	5 years, 236 days	3rd (1967 election)	Indian National Congress (O)
–		Vacant (Note: President's rule may be imposed when the "government in a state is not able to function as per the Constitution", which often happens because no party or coalition has a majority in the assembly. When President's rule is in force in a state, its council of ministers stands dissolved. The office of chief minister thus lies vacant, and the administration is taken over by the governor, who functions on behalf of the central government. At times, the legislative assembly also stands dissolved.) (President's rule)	N/A	13 May 1971	17 March 1972	309 days	Dissolved	N/A
4		Ghanshyam Oza	Dahegam	17 March 1972	17 July 1973	1 year, 122 days	4th (1972 election)	Indian National Congress
5		Chimanbhai Patel	Sankheda	17 July 1973	9 February 1974	207 days	4th (1972 election)	Indian National Congress
–		Vacant (President's rule)	N/A	9 February 1974	18 June 1975	1 year, 129 days	Dissolved	N/A
6		Babubhai Patel	Sabarmati	18 June 1975	12 March 1976	268 days	5th (1975 election)	Indian National Congress (O)
–		Vacant (President's rule)	N/A	12 March 1976	24 December 1976	287 days	5th (1975 election)	N/A
7		Madhav Singh Solanki	Bhadran	24 December 1976	11 April 1977	108 days	5th (1975 election)	Indian National Congress
(6)		Babubhai Patel	Sabarmati	11 April 1977	17 February 1980	2 years, 312 days	5th (1975 election)	Janata Party
–		Vacant (President's rule)	N/A	17 February 1980	7 June 1980	111 days		N/A
(7)		Madhav Singh Solanki	Bhadran	7 June 1980	10 March 1985	5 years, 29 days	6th (1980 election)	Indian National Congress
(7)		Madhav Singh Solanki	Bhadran	11 March 1985	6 July 1985	5 years, 29 days	7th (1985 election)	Indian National Congress
8		Amarsinh Chaudhary	Vyara	6 July 1985	10 December 1989	4 years, 157 days	7th (1985 election)	Indian National Congress
(7)		Madhav Singh Solanki	Bhadran	10 December 1989	4 March 1990	84 days	7th (1985 election)	Indian National Congress
(5)		Chimanbhai Patel	Sankheda	4 March 1990	25 October 1990	3 years, 350 days	8th (1990 election)	Janata Dal
(5)		Chimanbhai Patel	Sankheda	25 October 1990	17 February 1994	3 years, 350 days	8th (1990 election)	Indian National Congress
9		Chhabildas Mehta	Mahuva	17 February 1994	14 March 1995	1 year, 25 days	8th (1990 election)	Indian National Congress
10		Keshubhai Patel	Visavadar	14 March 1995	21 October 1995	221 days	9th (1995 election)	Bharatiya Janata Party
11		Suresh Mehta	Mandvi	21 October 1995	19 September 1996	334 days	9th (1995 election)	Bharatiya Janata Party
–		Vacant (President's rule)	N/A	19 September 1996	23 October 1996	34 days	9th (1995 election)	N/A
12		Shankersinh Vaghela	Radhanpur	23 October 1996	27 October 1997	1 year, 4 days	9th (1995 election)	Rashtriya Janata Party
13		Dilip Parikh	Dhandhuka	27 October 1997	4 March 1998	128 days	9th (1995 election)	Rashtriya Janata Party
(10)		Keshubhai Patel	Visavadar	4 March 1998	7 October 2001	3 years, 217 days	10th (1998 election)	Bharatiya Janata Party
14		Narendra Modi	Rajkot West	7 October 2001	22 December 2002	12 years, 227 days	10th (1998 election)	Bharatiya Janata Party
14		Narendra Modi	Maninagar	22 December 2002	22 December 2007	12 years, 227 days	11th (2002 election)	Bharatiya Janata Party
14		Narendra Modi	Maninagar	23 December 2007	20 December 2012	12 years, 227 days	12th (2007 election)	Bharatiya Janata Party
14		Narendra Modi	Maninagar	20 December 2012	22 May 2014	12 years, 227 days	13th (2012 election)	Bharatiya Janata Party
15		Anandiben Patel	Ghatlodia	22 May 2014	7 August 2016	2 years, 77 days	13th (2012 election)	Bharatiya Janata Party
16		Vijay Rupani	Rajkot West	7 August 2016	26 December 2017	5 years, 37 days	13th (2012 election)	Bharatiya Janata Party
16		Vijay Rupani	Rajkot West	26 December 2017	13 September 2021	5 years, 37 days	14th (2017 election)	Bharatiya Janata Party
17		Bhupendrabhai Patel	Ghatlodia	13 September 2021	12 December 2022	5 years, 37 days	14th (2017 election)	Bharatiya Janata Party
17		Bhupendrabhai Patel	Ghatlodia	12 December 2022	Incumbent	5 years, 37 days	15th (2022 election)	Bharatiya Janata Party

== Statistics ==
Fraction of time of holding CMO by party (as of 22 August 2026)
1. Bharatiya Janata Party (45.2%)
2. Indian National Congress (39.0%)
3. Janata Party (4.30%)
4. Indian National Congress (O) (3.37%)
5. Rashtriya Janata Party (2.05%)
6. Janata Dal (0.97%)
7. President's Rule (5.10%)

=== List by chief minister ===
#	Chief Minister	Party	Term of office	
#	Chief Minister	Party	Longest tenure	Total tenure
1	Narendra Modi	BJP	12 years, 227 days	12 years, 227 days
2	Hitendra Desai	INC/INC(O)	5 years, 236 days	5 years, 236 days
3	Madhav Singh Solanki	INC	5 years, 29 days	5 years, 221 days
4	Bhupendrabhai Patel	BJP	5 years, 37 days	5 years, 37 days
5	Vijay Rupani	BJP	5 years, 37 days	5 years, 37 days
6	Chimanbhai Patel	INC	3 years, 350 days	4 years, 192 days
7	Amarsinh Chaudhary	INC	4 years, 157 days	4 years, 157 days
8	Keshubhai Patel	BJP	3 years, 217 days	4 years, 73 days
9	Babubhai Patel	JP/INC (O)	2 years, 312 days	3 years, 215 days
10	Jivraj Mehta	INC	3 years, 141 days	3 years, 141 days
11	Anandiben Patel	BJP	2 years, 77 days	2 years, 77 days
12	Balwantrai Mehta	INC	2 years, 0 days	2 years, 0 days
13	Ghanshyam Oza	INC	1 year, 122 days	1 year, 122 days
14	Chhabildas Mehta	INC	1 year, 25 days	1 year, 25 days
15	Shankersinh Vaghela	RJP	1 year, 4 days	1 year, 4 days
16	Suresh Mehta	BJP	334 days	334 days
17	Dilip Parikh	RJP	128 days	128 days
