= Ashvin Kotwal =

Member of Legislative Assembly from Gujarat

Kotwal Ashvinbhai Laxmanbhai

Member of the Gujarat Legislative Assembly
- In office 2007–2022
- Preceded by: Amarsinh Chaudhary
- Constituency: Khedbrahma

Personal details
- Born: 21 October 1964 (age 61)
- Party: Bharatiya Janata Party (since 2022)
- Other political affiliations: Indian National Congress (until 2022)

Kotwal Ashvinbhai Laxmanbhai (born 21 October 1964), also known as Ashvin Kotwal or Ashvinkumar Kotval, is an Indian farmer and politician who has served in the Gujarat Legislative Assembly from 2007 to 2022, representing Khedbrahma. Kotwal is also an Adivasi tribal leader.

On 2 May 2022, Kotwal defected from the Indian National Congress and joined the Bharatiya Janata Party. Kotwal defected because INC refused to give him the role of Leader of the Opposition in the Gujarat Legislative Assembly, selecting Sukhram Rathva instead. He was defeated in the 2022 Gujarat Legislative Assembly election.
