= Tushar Chaudhary =

Indian politician

Dr. Tushar Chaudhary
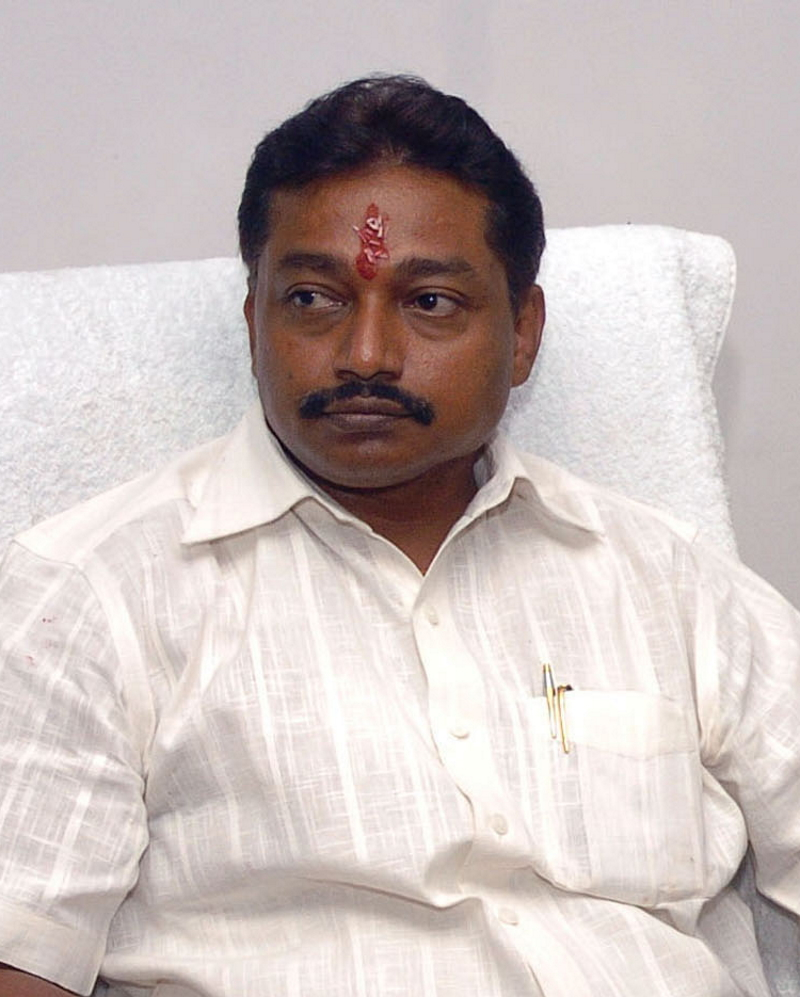
- Chaudhary in 2009

Leader, Congress Legislative Party, Gujarat
- Incumbent
- Assumed office 17 July 2025
- Preceded by: Amit Chavda

Member of Gujarat Legislative Assembly
- Incumbent
- Assumed office 2022
- Preceded by: Ashvin Kotwal
- Constituency: Khedbrahma

Minister of State for Tribal Affairs (India)
- In office 28 May 2009 – 18 January 2011

Minister of State for Road Transport and Highways
- In office 19 January 2011 – 14 October 2012

Member of Parliament
- In office 2009–2014
- Constituency: Bardoli

Member of Parliament
- In office 2004–2009
- Constituency: Mandvi

Personal details
- Born: 18 December 1965 (age 60) Surat, Gujarat, India
- Party: Indian National Congress
- Spouse: Dr. Dipti Chaudhary
- Parent: Amarsinh Chaudhary (father)
- Education: M.B.B.S, M. S. University, Baroda, Gujarat

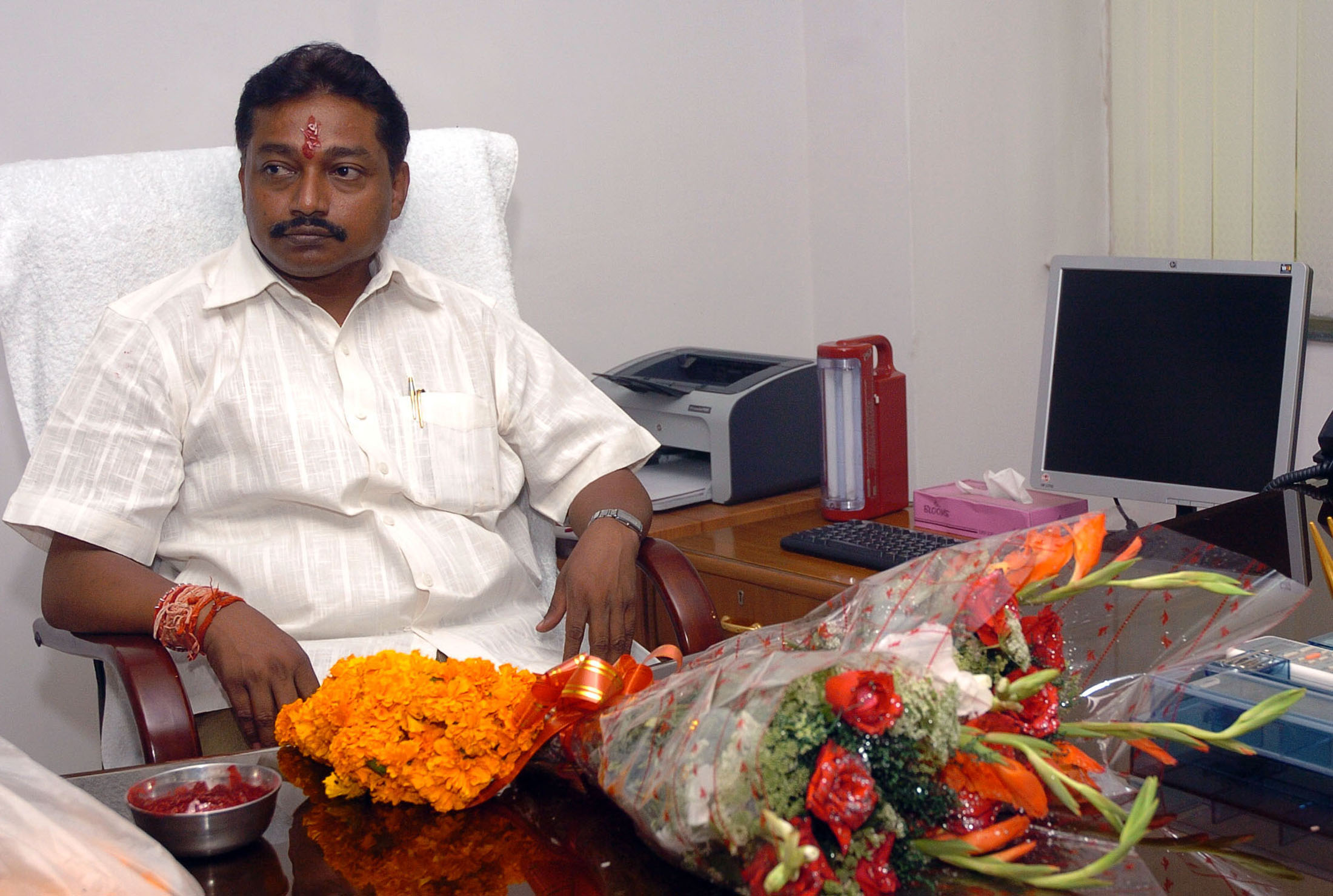
Chaudhary in his office after taking the charge as the Minister of State for Tribal Affairs, in New Delhi on 1 June 2009

Tushar Chaudhary (born 18 December 1965) is an Indian politician and a leader of the Indian National Congress in Gujarat. He was elected to Gujarat Legislative Assembly in 2002 and 2022, and to Lok Sabha in 2004 and 2009.

== Early life ==
Chaudhary was born on 18 December 1965 in Bedkuvta Valod village in Surat district of Gujarat. He is a son of Amarsinh Chaudhary, a politician and former chief minister of Gujarat. He has studied MBBS from Maharaja Sayajirao University of Baroda.

== Career ==
He was elected from Vyara in 2002 Gujarat legislative assembly election. In 2004, he was elected to 14th Lok Sabha from Mandvi constituency. In 2009, he was elected to the 15th Lok Sabha from Bardoli constituency. He was the Union Minister of State for Tribal Affairs from 28 May 2009 to 28 September 2012. On 28 September 2012 he became the Union Minister of State for Road Transport and Highways.

He contested 2014 and 2019 Indian general elections from Bardoli but lost both times. In 2017 Gujarat legislative assembly election, he lost from Mahuva constituency. In 2022 Gujarat legislative assembly election, he contested and was elected from Khedbrahma constituency defeating his nearest rival Bharatiya Janata Party candidate Ashvin Kotwal.

== Personal life ==
In 1991, Chaudhary married Dipti Chaudhary. They have a daughter and a son.
