= 1980 Gujarat Legislative Assembly election =

State assembly elections in India

- 7 June 1980

All 182 seats in the Gujarat Legislative Assembly 92 seats needed for a majority
	Majority party	Minority party
		JP
Leader	Madhav Singh Solanki
Party	INC	JP
Leader's seat	Bhadran
Last election	75
Seats won	141	21
Seat change	▲66	▲21
Chief Minister before election
President's Rule
Elected Chief Minister
Madhav Singh Solanki
INC

The 6th Gujarat Legislative Assembly election was held in 1980. Indian National Congress (INC) won 141 seats out of 182 seats. While, Janata Party (JP) won 21 seats and Bharatiya Janata Party (BJP) won nine seats. INC performed better in this election and gained 66 seats.

A total of 950 men and 24 women contested the election. Total 177 men and 5 women won in elections. The number of polling stations was 21,137 and the number of electors per polling station was 785.

== Results ==
Party	Votes	%	Seats	+/–
Indian National Congress (I)	3,971,238	51.04	141	New
Janata Party	1,771,853	22.77	21	New
Bharatiya Janata Party	1,090,652	14.02	9	New
Janata Party (Secular)	49,278	0.63	1	New
Others	122,299	1.57	0	0
Independents	775,813	9.97	10	▼6
Total	7,781,133	100.00	182	0
Valid votes	7,781,133	97.48		
Invalid/blank votes	200,862	2.52		
Total votes	7,981,995	100.00		
Registered voters/turnout	16,501,328	48.37		
Source: ECI

== Elected members ==
Constituency	Reserved for (SC/ST/None)	Member	Party
Abdasa	None	Kharashanker Vithaldas Joshi	Indian National Congress
Mandvi	None	Sanghvi Jaykumar Chunilal	Indian National Congress
Bhuj	None	Shah Mohanlal Nemchand	Indian National Congress
Mundra	SC	Dafda Virji Bhimji	Indian National Congress
Anjar	None	Khimjibhai Jesangbhai	Indian National Congress
Rapar	None	Shah Babubhai Meghji	Bharatiya Janata Party
Dasada	SC	Chavda Shantaben Khimjibhai	Indian National Congress
Wadhwan	None	Acharya Arvindkumar Pranjivanbhai	Indian National Congress
Limbdi	None	Dave Trambaklal Mohanlal	Indian National Congress
Chotila	None	Makawana Karamsibhai Knajibhai	Indian National Congress
Halvad	None	Zala Jivubha Ghelubha	Janata Party
Dhrangadhra	None	Nagindas Manekchand Shah	Independent
Morvi	None	Saradava Jivraj Thobhan	Indian National Congress
Tankara	None	Patel Vallabhbhai Popatlal	Independent
Wankaner	None	Pirzada Manjur Hussain Abdul Mutlib	Indian National Congress
Jasdan	None	Dabhi Mamaiya Haribhai	Independent
Rajkot-i	None	Jadeja Mancharsinhji Pradumansinhji	Indian National Congress
Rajkot-ii	None	Manibhai Ranpara	Indian National Congress
Rajkot Rural	SC	Vaghela Bhanubhai Gigabhai	Indian National Congress
Gondal	None	Patel Keshubhai Savdas	Bharatiya Janata Party
Jetpur	None	Vekaria Jamnadas Samjibhai	Indian National Congress
Dhoraji	None	Ramnikbhai Dhaml	Janata Party
Upleta	None	Manvar Balvantray Bachulal	Indian National Congress
Jodiya	None	Patel Bhanji Bhimji	Janata Party
Jamnagar	None	M. K. Bloch	Indian National Congress
Jamnagar Rural	SC	Parmar Bhanji Kama	Indian National Congress
Kalawad	None	Patel Bhimjibhai Vasrambhai	Independent
Jamjodhpur	None	Patel Chimanbhai Jiwabhai	Janata Party
Bhanvad	None	Karangiya Bhimsi Kesur	Indian National Congress
Khambhalia	None	Madam Hematbhai Rambhai	Independent
Dwarka	None	Trivedi Lilaben Gaurishanker	Indian National Congress
Porbandar	None	Lakhani Shashikant Anandlal	Indian National Congress
Kutiyana	None	Mahant Vijaydasji Virdasji	Indian National Congress
Mangrol	None	Antroliya Sukabhai Ramabhai	Independent
Manavadar	None	Hudka Muljibhai Kalidas	Indian National Congress
Keshod	SC	Vanavi Devjibhai Bhikhabhai	Indian National Congress
Talala	None	Zala Kalabhai Ranmalbhai	Indian National Congress
Somnath	None	Vadher Rudabhai Devshi	Janata Party
Una	None	Ukabhai Sidibhai Zala	Indian National Congress
Visavadar	None	Ribadiya Dhirajlal Fulabhai	Janata Party
Maliya	None	Raijada Hamirji Hathisinh	Indian National Congress
Junagadh	None	Patel Gordhanbhai Gokalbhai	Indian National Congress
Babra	None	Palasana Becharbhai Madhabhai	Independent
Lathi	None	Khodidas Thakkar	Indian National Congress
Amreli	None	Dwarkadas Mohanlal Patel	Independent
Dhari	None	Manubhai Kotadiya	Janata Party
Kodinar	None	Kamaliya Arshibhai Kanabhai	Indian National Congress
Rajula	None	Varu Partpbhai Suragbhai	Indian National Congress
Botad	None	Khachar Hathibhai Chhelbhai	Indian National Congress
Gadhada	SC	Gohel Bachubhai Bhikhabhai	Indian National Congress
Palitana	None	Dabhi Natubhai Bhikhabhai	Independent
Sihor	None	Gothani Dalsukhbhai Jerambhai	Janata Party
Kundla	None	Desai Ramjibhai Vallabhdas	Indian National Congress
Mahuva	None	Jani Vrijlal Durlabhji	Indian National Congress
Talaja	None	Baladhiya Dhanjibhai Hirabhai	Indian National Congress
Ghogho	None	Gohil Kiritsinh Anopsinh	Indian National Congress
Bhavnagar North	None	Shah Rasiklal Nathalal	Indian National Congress
Bhavnagar South	None	Patel Trambaklal Muljibhai (patel Babubhai Vakil)	Indian National Congress
Dhandhuka	None	Shah Natvarlal Chandulal	Indian National Congress
Dholka	None	Makwana Parsottambhai Ravjibhai	Indian National Congress
Bavla	SC	Gohil Dhulabhai Dalabhai	Janata Party
Mandal	None	Patel Bhailal Ambalal	Indian National Congress
Viramgam	None	Patel Daudbhai Miyanbhai	Indian National Congress
Sarkhej	None	Harishanker Pandya	Indian National Congress
Daskroi	None	Fatesinh Sodha	Indian National Congress
Dehgam	None	Rathod Khumansinh Gambhirsinh	Indian National Congress
Sabarmati	None	Kokilaben Hariprasad Vyas	Indian National Congress
Ellis Bridge	None	Babubhai Vasanwala	Janata Party
Dariapur-kazipur	None	Surendra Rajput	Indian National Congress
Shahpur	None	Kamdar Vadilal Ratilal	Indian National Congress
Kalupur	None	Mohammed Husein Barejia	Indian National Congress
Asarwa	None	Laxmanbhai Kalidas Patani	Indian National Congress
Rakhial	None	Prabodh Raval	Indian National Congress
Shaher Kotda	SC	Manubhai Parmar	Indian National Congress
Khadia	None	Ashok Bhatt	Bharatiya Janata Party
Jamalpur	None	Abdul Rahim Tajuji (lalbhai Kundiwala)	Indian National Congress
Maninagar	None	Ramlal Ruplal	Indian National Congress
Naroda	None	Ramchand Tahalram	Indian National Congress
Gandhinagar	None	Kasambhai Bapu Limbadia	Indian National Congress
Kalol	None	Thakore Shankerji Kalaji	Indian National Congress
Kadi	None	Karsanji Maganji Thakor	Indian National Congress
Jotana	SC	Parmar Haribhai Khushalbhai	Indian National Congress
Mehsana	None	Zala Bhavsinghji Dansinhji	Indian National Congress
Mansa	None	Chavada Isvarsing Shivaji	Indian National Congress
Vijapur	None	Patel Amritlal Kalidas	Bharatiya Janata Party
Visnagar	None	Patel Gangarambhai Bhaichanddas	Bharatiya Janata Party
Kheralu	None	Desai Mohanbhai Nathubhai	Janata Party
Unjha	None	Patel Kanjibhai Lalludas	Janata Party
Sidhpur	None	Bati Sharifbhai Valibhai	Indian National Congress
Vagdod	None	Thakor Keshaji Shankerji	Janata Party
Patan	None	Patel Dahyabhai Pitambardas	Janata Party
Chanasma	None	Patel Arvindbhai Tribhovandas	Bharatiya Janata Party
Sami	None	Thakor Viraji Navaji	Bharatiya Janata Party
Radhanpur	None	Zula Khodidan Bhimji	Indian National Congress
Vav	None	Parmer Hemabhai Derghabhai	Indian National Congress
Deodar	None	Tarak Kalubhai Virabhai	Indian National Congress
Kankrej	None	Dhandhara Shantilal Chhotalal	Indian National Congress
Deesa	None	Desai Mohanbhai Visabhai	Janata Party
Dhanera	None	Patel Joitabhai Kasnabhai	Janata Party
Palanpur	None	Patel Amaratlal Kalidas	Indian National Congress
Vadgam	SC	Parmar Dolatbhai Chelaram	Indian National Congress
Danta	None	Harisinh Chavda	Janata Party
Khedbrahma	ST	Damor Jagdishchandraji Doljibhai	Indian National Congress
Idar	SC	L. D. Parmar	Indian National Congress
Bhiloda	None	Trivedi Manubhai Ambashanker	Indian National Congress
Himatnagar	None	Patel Nathbhai Devjibhai	Bharatiya Janata Party
Prantij	None	Patel Maganbhai Manibhai	Janata Party
Modasa	None	Ambalal Upadhyay	Independent
Bayad	None	Ramsingh Rupsingh Solanki	Indian National Congress
Meghraj	None	Pandya Gunvantlal Manilal	Indian National Congress
Santrampur	None	Damor Jivabhai Motibhai	Indian National Congress
Jhalod	ST	Munia Virjibhai Limbabhai	Indian National Congress
Limdi	ST	Damor Malsinh Fatabhai	Indian National Congress
Dohad	ST	Patel Lalitkumar Bhagvanbhai	Indian National Congress
Limkheda	ST	Pasaya Virsingh Bhulabhai	Indian National Congress
Devgadh Baria	None	Raman Patel	Indian National Congress
Rajgadh	None	Patel Shantilal Parsottambhai	Janata Party
Halol	None	Baria Udesinh Mohanbhai	Indian National Congress
Kalol	None	Chauhan Prabhatsinh Pratapsinh	Indian National Congress
Godhra	None	Khalpa Abdulrahim Ismile	Indian National Congress
Shehra	None	Parmar Parwatsinh Ghamirsinh	Indian National Congress
Lunavada	None	Solanki Dhirendrasinhji Virbhadrasinhji	Indian National Congress
Randhikpur	ST	Gondia Badiabhai Muljibhai	Indian National Congress
Balasinor	None	Solanki Chhatrasingh Amarinhji	Indian National Congress
Kapadvanj	None	Chuhan Budhaji Jitaji	Indian National Congress
Thasra	None	Malek Vasinmia Usufmia	Indian National Congress
Umreth	None	Khambholja Hariharbhai Umiyashanker	Indian National Congress
Kathlal	None	Zala Maganbhai Gokadbhai	Indian National Congress
Mehmedabad	None	Bansilal Bapalal Pandya	Indian National Congress
Mahudha	None	Sodha Balvantsinh Sudhansinh	Indian National Congress
Nadiad	None	Patel Dinshah Jhaverbhai	Janata Party
Chakalasi	None	Amarsinhji Bhupatsinhji Vaghela	Indian National Congress
Anand	None	Solanki Ranchhodbhai Shanabhai	Indian National Congress
Sarsa	None	Govindbhai J. Patel	Indian National Congress
Petlad	None	Chauhan Govindbhai Shankarbhai	Indian National Congress
Sojitra	SC	Makwana Shantabahen Yogendrakumar	Indian National Congress
Matar	None	Patel Parshottambhai Chaturbhai	Indian National Congress
Borsad	None	Gohel Umedbhai Fatehsinh	Indian National Congress
Bhadran	None	Solanki Madhavsinh Fulsinh	Indian National Congress
Cambay	None	Chudasma Vijaysinhji Ladhubha	Indian National Congress
Chhota Udaipur	ST	Rathava Karasanbhai Bodabhai	Indian National Congress
Jetpur	None	Rathwa Mohansinh Chhotubhai	Janata Party
Nasvadi	ST	Bhil Meghabhai Jagabhai	Indian National Congress
Sankheda	ST	Tadvi Bhaijibhai Bhanabhai	Indian National Congress
Dabhoi	None	Umakant Ratanlal Joshi	Janata Party
Savli	None	Pamar Prabhatsing Jarsinh	Indian National Congress
Baroda City	None	Ranjitsinh P. Gaekwad	Indian National Congress
Sayajiganj	None	Shirish Purohit	Indian National Congress
Raopura	None	Patel C. N.	Indian National Congress
Vaghodia	None	Mehta Sanatkumar Manganlal	Indian National Congress
Baroda Rural	None	Chauhan Mahendrasinh Takhatsinh	Indian National Congress
Padra	None	Jitubhai Somabhai Parmar	Indian National Congress
Karjan	SC	Nagar Hargovinddas Khushaldas	Indian National Congress
Jambusar	None	Solanki Maganbhai Bhukhanbhai	Indian National Congress
Vagra	None	Makwana Prabhatsinh Bavabhai	Indian National Congress
Broach	None	Patel Mohmedbhai Hafezi Ismail	Indian National Congress
Ankleshwar	None	Patel Nathubhai Narotambhai	Indian National Congress
Jhagadia	ST	Vasava Ravadas Limjibhai	Indian National Congress
Dediapada	ST	Vasava Ramjibhai Hirabhai	Indian National Congress
Rajpipla	ST	Vasava Premsingbhai Devjibhai	Indian National Congress
Nijhar	ST	Vasava Govindbhai Barakiabhai	Indian National Congress
Mangrol	ST	Vasava Mansukhlal Janiabhai	Indian National Congress
Songadh	ST	Gamit Vasanjibhai Ganjibhai	Indian National Congress
Vyara	ST	Amarsinh Bhilabhai Chaudhary	Indian National Congress
Mahuva	ST	Dhodia Dhanjibhai Karsanbhai	Indian National Congress
Bardoli	ST	Halpati Jitubhai Chhitubhai	Indian National Congress
Kamrej	ST	Rathod Naranbhai Vanmalibhai	Indian National Congress
Olpad	None	Patel Balubhai Devabhai	Indian National Congress
Surat City North	None	Pachchigar Kushnavadan Dhansukhlal	Indian National Congress
Surat City East	None	Chohan Jashawantsinh Dansinh	Indian National Congress
Surat City West	None	Mohammed Surti	Indian National Congress
Chorasi	None	Patel Ushaben Babubhai	Indian National Congress
Jalalpore	None	Patel Vasantbhai Parbhubhai	Indian National Congress
Navsari	ST	Talavia Mohanbhai Ranchhodbhai	Indian National Congress
Gandevi	None	Desai Dinker Bhikhubhai	Indian National Congress
Chikhli	ST	Patel Kanjibhai Maganbhai	Bharatiya Janata Party
Dangs-bansda	ST	Patel Govindbhai Mahujibhai	Indian National Congress
Bulsar	None	Desai Dolatbhai Nathubhai	Indian National Congress
Dharampur	ST	Patel Shankarbhai Ravjibhai	Indian National Congress
Mota Pondha	ST	Patel Barjulbhai Navlabhai	Indian National Congress
Pardi	ST	Patel Ramanbhai Devabhai	Indian National Congress
Umbergaon	ST	Patel Chhotubhai Vestabhai	Indian National Congress
