= Majura Assembly constituency =

Legislative Assembly constituency in Gujarat State, India

Coordinates: 21.17°N 72.83°E

Majura
- Constituency No. 165 for the Gujarat Legislative Assembly

Constituency details
- Country: India
- Region: Western India
- State: Gujarat
- District: Surat
- Lok Sabha constituency: Navsari
- Established: 2008
- Total electors: 278,984
- Reservation: None

Member of Legislative Assembly
- 15th Gujarat Legislative Assembly
- Incumbent Harsh Sanghavi
- Party: Bharatiya Janata Party
- Elected year: 2022

Majura is one of the 182 Legislative Assembly constituencies of Gujarat state in India. It is part of Surat district and it came into existence after 2008 delimitation.

== List of segments ==
This assembly had represents the following segments,

1. Surat City Taluka (Part) – Surat Municipal Corporation (Part) Ward No. – 13, 33, 34, 37, 57, 58, 59, 60, 61, 62.

== Member of Legislative Assembly ==
Year	Member	Party
2012	Harsh Sanghavi	Bharatiya Janata Party
2017	Harsh Sanghavi	Bharatiya Janata Party
2022	Harsh Sanghavi	Bharatiya Janata Party

== Election results ==
=== 2022 ===
Gujarat Assembly election, 2022:Majura Assembly constituency
Party	Candidate	Votes	%	±%
BJP	Harsh Sanghavi	133,335	81.97	▲5.32
AAP	P. V. S. Sarma	16,660	10.24	
INC	Balwant Jain	9,447	5.81	
BSP	Rameshprasad Chamar	904	0.56	
NOTA	None of the above	2,315	1.42	
Majority		1,16,675	71.73	
Turnout		1,62,661		
Registered electors		275,925		
BJP hold		Swing		

=== 2017 ===
Gujarat Legislative Assembly Election, 2017: Majura
Party	Candidate	Votes	%	±%
BJP	Harsh Sanghavi	116,741	76.65	+3.11
INC	Ashok Mohanlal Kothari	30,914	20.30	−2.43
SS	Jigar Ashokbhai Vyas	539	0.35	New
Majority		85,827	56.35	+5.55
Turnout		1,52,303	62.15	−1.9
BJP hold		Swing		

=== 2012 ===
Gujarat Assembly Election, 2012
Party	Candidate	Votes	%	±%
BJP	Harsh Sanghavi	103577	73.54	
INC	Dhanpatraj Jain	32021	22.73	
Majority		71556	50.80	
Turnout		140849	64.05	
BJP win (new seat)				

== See also ==
- List of constituencies of Gujarat Legislative Assembly
- Gujarat Legislative Assembly
