= Bhadran, Gujarat =

Bhadran
- Village
- Location in Gujarat, India
- Coordinates: 22.3593°N 72.9005°E
- Country: India
- State: Gujarat
- District: Anand

Government
  - Type: Gram Panchayat

Area
  - Total: 5 km^{2} (1.9 sq mi)
- Elevation: 30 m (98 ft)

Population (2011)
  - Total: 9,273
  - Density: 2,029/km^{2} (5,260/sq mi)

Languages
  - Official: Gujarati, Hindi
- Time zone: UTC+5:30 (IST)
- PIN: 388 530
- Telephone code: 02696-288/289
- Vehicle registration: GJ 23

Bhadran is a village in the state of Gujarat, in far western India. It is in the Anand district.

== Geography and climate ==
Bhadran is located at 22° 21′ 33.48″ N, 72° 54′ 1.8″ E. The total area of Bhadran is around 5 square kilometres (2 sq mi). The village is located on the fertile plains of Mahi river, 10 km (6 mi) north of mouth of Mahi river where it meets Gulf of Khambhat.

There are three main seasons: Summer, Monsoon and Winter. Aside from the monsoon season, the climate is dry. The weather is hot through the months of March to July — the average summer maximum is 36 °C (97 °F), and the average minimum is 23 °C (73 °F). From November to February, the average maximum temperature is 30 °C (85 °F), the average minimum is 15 °C (59 °F), and the climate is extremely dry. Cold northerly winds are responsible for a mild chill in January. The southwest monsoon brings a humid climate from mid-June to mid-September. The average rainfall is 93 cm (36.7 inches), but infrequent heavy torrential rains cause the river to flood, but has great agricultural for tobacco and mangos.
