= Anklav =

- city
- Location in Gujarat, India Anklav (India)
- Coordinates: 22.39127°N 72.99455°E
- Country: India
- State: Gujarat
- District: Anand

Population (2001)
  - Total: 19,805

Languages
  - Official: Gujarati, Hindi
- Time zone: UTC+5:30 (IST)
- PIN: 388510
- Vehicle registration: GJ-23
- Website: gujaratindia.com

Anklav is a city and a municipality in Anand district in the state of Gujarat, India.

== Demographics ==
As of 2001 India census, Anklav had a population of 19,805. Males constitute 53% of the population and females 47%. Anklav has an average literacy rate of 62%, higher than the national average of 59.5%; with 60% of the males and 40% of females literate. 14% of the population is under 6 years of age.

== Other information ==
Anklav is situated on Vadodara–Kathana broad gauge railway line. It is a taluka place having Taluka Govt. Offices like Taluka Panchayat, Mamlatdar Office, Taluka Health Office. Community Health center is running 24 hours to provide Primary & Emergency Health services. Anklav Town is mainly divided in 2 major parts, 1. Compact Town area (60% population) & 2. peripheral field area (40% Population). Compact town area is divided in streets like Bahila ni Khadki, Shirvi ni Khadki, Undi khadki, Shakkar das ni khadaki, Moti khadaki, Vanto, Valasaniya Khadki, Ambalipura, Brahmpol & many more.

Anklav is member of 24 Gam and 17 Gam leuva patidar samaj.
