= KHAM theory =

KHAM (hindi: खाम) stands for Koli, Kshatriya, Harijan, Adivasi and Muslim. Here Kshatriya is taken to include the Kolis. In the KHAM combine, Kolis were the largest caste represented at different levels of politics, and Madhavsinh Solanki increased the reservation quota for Other Backward Classes in Gujarat. The theory was propounded by Madhavsinh Solanki in 1980s in Gujarat to create vote bank for Indian National Congress and prepared by Jhinabhai Darji. Using the formula, Congress was able to capture 149 seats in the 182-member Assembly. However the formula alienated Patels permanently from Congress. during the Kham alliance, castes such as Bania, Patidar and Brahmins lost their importance in the state, so they propounded the Anti reservation agitation in 1981 and 1985 in Gujarat to get rid of the power of OBC castes.

Bharatsinh Solanki, state Congress president and the son of Madhavsinh Solanki, attempted to revise his father's formula by coming up with KHAMP (Kshatriya, Harijan, Adivasi, Muslim, and Patel) in 2017. While Congress was able to increase its seat count by 16, it ultimately failed to receive majority. The Congress was able to get Hardik Patel, the leader of the Patidar reservation agitation to campaign for it.

An article by Deepal Trivedi in 2019 suggests the combination OPT (OBC, Patidar, Tribals) is the new winning combination in Gujarat. It suggests these numbers for the major caste groups in Gujarat: OBC 43%, Patidar 12.6%, Tribals 15%, Muslims 10%, Scheduled castes 8%. The forward castes are Rajputs 6%, Brahmins 2%, Bania 2%, Jain 1%. OBC (Other backward class) refer to a group of castes, as determined by the state government for affirmative action.

== See also ==
- List of Koli people
- List of Koli states and clans
- Caste politics
- Kokam theory
