= Anklav Assembly constituency =

Legislative Assembly constituency in Gujarat State, India

Coordinates: 22.38°N 73°E

Anklav
- Constituency No. 110 for the Gujarat Legislative Assembly

Constituency details
- Country: India
- Region: Western India
- State: Gujarat
- District: Anand
- Lok Sabha constituency: Anand
- Established: 2008
- Total electors: 225,231
- Reservation: None

Member of Legislative Assembly
- 15th Gujarat Legislative Assembly
- Incumbent Amit Chavda
- Party: Indian National Congress
- Elected year: 2022

Anklav is one of the 182 Legislative Assembly constituencies of Gujarat state in India.

It is part of Anand district.

== List of segments ==
This assembly seat represents the following segments,

SI No.	Name
1.	Anklav Taluka
Anand Taluka (Part) Villages
2.	Khanpur
3.	Sarsa
4.	Bedva
5.	Gopalpura
6.	Mogar
7.	Kherda
8.	Vaherakhadi
9.	Ramnagar
10.	Vadod
11.	Napad Vanto
12.	Napad Talpad
13.	Adas
14.	Anklavdi
15.	Rajupura
16.	Vasad
17.	Sundan

== Members of Legislative Assembly ==
Election	Name	Party
2012	Amit Chavda	Indian National Congress
2017	Amit Chavda	Indian National Congress
2022	Amit Chavda	Indian National Congress

== Election results ==
=== 2022 ===
Gujarat Assembly election, 2022:Anklav Assembly constituency
Party	Candidate	Votes	%	±%
INC	Amit Chavda	81,512	48.71	
BJP	Gulabsinh Ratansinh Padhiyar	78,783	47.07	
AAP	Gajendrasinh Harisinh Raj	1,603	0.96	
Majority		2,729	1.64	
Registered electors		221,099		
INC hold		Swing		

=== 2017 ===
Gujarat Assembly Election, 2017:Anklav
Party	Candidate	Votes	%	±%
INC	Amit Chavda	90,603	58.30	+0.43
BJP	Hansakuvarba Raj	56,974	36.66	+0.30
Majority		33,629	21.64	+0.13
Turnout		1,55,399	76.12	
INC hold		Swing		

=== 2012 ===
Gujarat Assembly Election, 2012
Party	Candidate	Votes	%	±%
INC	Amit Chavda	81,575	57.87	
BJP	Jasvantsinh Solanki	51,256	36.36	
Majority		30,319	21.51	
Turnout		140,957	78.57	
INC win (new seat)				

== See also ==
- List of constituencies of the Gujarat Legislative Assembly
- Anand district
