= Chhabildas Mehta =

Indian politician

9th Chief Minister of Gujarat
- In office 17 February 1994 – 14 March 1995
- Preceded by: Chimanbhai Patel
- Succeeded by: Keshubhai Patel

Personal details
- Born: 4 November 1925 Mahuva, Bhavnagar State, British India
- Died: 29 November 2008 (aged 83) Ahmedabad, Gujarat, India
- Party: Praja Samajwadi Party
- Other political affiliations: Indian National Congress; Janata Party; Janata Dal; Nationalist Congress Party
- Spouse: Krishna Chhabildas Mehta
- Children: 5

Chhabildas Mehta (4 November 1925 – 29 November 2008) was an Indian politician and the former Chief Minister of Gujarat who served from 1994 to 1995.

== Early life ==
Mehta was in born in Mahuva, a port town in Gujarat. He left high school in 1942 and participated in Indian independence movement.

== Career ==
He became the president of the Mahuva Municipality. Later he was elected as a member of the Bombay Legislative Council. He participated in Mahagujarat Movement which demanded separate Gujarat state from Bombay state. He was elected to the Gujarat Legislative Assembly in 1962 from Mahuva constituency which he held till 1980.

He entered in the politics by joining the Praja Samajwadi Party. Later he joined Indian National Congress (INC). He was in the cabinet of Chimanbhai Patel as Finance Minister and he had been made Chief Minister of Gujarat after the sudden death of Chimanbhai Patel in 1994. He had joined the Janata Party followed by Janata Dal. Later he rejoined the INC. In May 2001, he resigned from the INC to join the Nationalist Congress Party and contested election but lost. He died on 29 November 2008 in Ahmedabad.
