= 1967 Gujarat Legislative Assembly election =

State assembly election in India

All 168 seats in the Gujarat Legislative Assembly 85 seats needed for a majority
	Majority party	Minority party
	INC	SWA
Leader	Hitendra Kanaiyalal Desai
Party	INC	SWA
Leader's seat	Olpad Assembly constituency
Last election	113	26
Seats won	93	66
Seat change	▼20	▲40
Chief Minister before election
Hitendra Kanaiyalal Desai
INC
Elected Chief Minister
Hitendra Kanaiyalal Desai
INC

The 3rd Gujarat Legislative Assembly election was held in 1967. It was the second election held after formation of Gujarat. Indian National Congress (INC) won 93 seats out of 168 seats. While, Swatantra Party (SWA) won 66 seats. INC performed badly in this election and lost 20 seats, and SWA improve performance and won 40 more seats. Total 599 men and 14 women contested in the election. Total 160 men and 8 women won in the elections. Number of polling stations were 11,554 and number of electors per polling stations were 926.

== Results ==
Party	Votes	%	Seats	+/–
Indian National Congress	2,933,059	45.96	93	▼20
Swatantra Party	2,436,901	38.19	66	▲40
Praja Socialist Party	212,314	3.33	3	▼4
Bharatiya Jana Sangh	120,147	1.88	1	New
Others	28,574	0.45	0	0
Independents	650,097	10.19	5	▼12
Total	6,381,092	100.00	168	▲14
Valid votes	6,381,092	79.77		
Invalid/blank votes	1,618,322	20.23		
Total votes	7,999,414	100.00		
Registered voters/turnout	10,694,972	74.80		
Source: ECI

== Elected members ==
Constituency	Reserved for (SC/ST/None)	Member	Party
Abdasa	None	P. B. Thacker	Indian National Congress
Bhuj	None	M. M. Mehta	Indian National Congress
Mandvi	None	J. L. Mehta	Indian National Congress
Mundra	SC	V. B. Dafda	Swatantra Party
Anjar	None	N. H. Gajwani	Indian National Congress
Rapar	None	B. Gajsinhji	Swatantra Party
Dasada	None	C. C. Popatlal	Swatantra Party
Wadhwan	None	S. J. Jhala	Swatantra Party
Limbdi	SC	H. R. Doria	Swatantra Party
Chotila	None	Dharmendrasinhji	Swatantra Party
Dhrangadhra	None	Moorrajji	Swatantra Party
Morvi	None	V. V. Mehta	Swatantra Party
Tankara	None	V. J. Shah	Indian National Congress
Wankaner	None	D. Pratapsinhji	Swatantra Party
Jasdan	None	S. Khachar	Swatantra Party
Rajkot 1	None	C. H. Shukla	Bharatiya Jana Sangh
Rajkot 2	None	M. P. Jadeja	Swatantra Party
Gondal	None	B. H. Patel	Indian National Congress
Jetpur	None	N. K. Patel	Indian National Congress
Dhoraji	None	M. G. Patel	Indian National Congress
Upleta	None	J. A. Patel	Indian National Congress
Jodia	None	C. D. Thakor	Swatantra Party
Jamnagar	None	L. Patel	Swatantra Party
Alia	None	S. D. Patel	Indian National Congress
Kalawad	None	B. B. Patel	Indian National Congress
Jamjodhpur	None	N. P. Bhanvadia	Swatantra Party
Khambhalia	None	D. V. Barai	Swatantra Party
Dwarka	None	K. G. Raichura	Indian National Congress
Porbandar	None	P. D. Kakkad	Indian National Congress
Kutiyana	None	B. B. Gajera	Swatantra Party
Mangrol	None	N. P. Gandhi	Independent
Somnath	None	K. B. Dodiya	Swatantra Party
Malia	None	K. K. Mori	Indian National Congress
Keshod	None	D. D. Patel	Swatantra Party
Manavadar	SC	M. A. Chanda	Indian National Congress
Junagadh	None	P. K. Dave	Indian National Congress
Visavadar	None	K. D. Bhesania	Swatantra Party
Una	None	P. J. Oza	Indian National Congress
Babra	None	J. D. Kansagra	Indian National Congress
Lathi	None	S. H. Bhatt	Indian National Congress
Amreli	None	N. G. Gondhiya	Indian National Congress
Dhari Kodinar	SC	R. T. Teuva	Indian National Congress
Rajula	None	J. Mehta	Indian National Congress
Kundla	None	B. K. Patel	Swatantra Party
Mahuva	None	C. P. Mehta	Indian National Congress
Palitana	None	D. J. Patel	Indian National Congress
Sihor	None	M. R. Pancholli	Indian National Congress
Gadhada	None	R. B. Gohil	Swatantra Party
Botad	None	P. G. Gohel	Indian National Congress
Bhavnagar	None	P. Shah	Indian National Congress
Ghogho	None	D. B. Mehta	Indian National Congress
Talaja	None	S. K. Gohil	Swatantra Party
Dhandhuka	None	V. B. Kotdawala	Swatantra Party
Dholka	None	K. G. Ghiya	Indian National Congress
Bavla	SC	D. S. Parmar	Swatantra Party
Sanand	None	D. B. Jadav	Swatantra Party
Viramgam	None	G. H. Patel	Indian National Congress
Ellisbridge	None	R. K. Patel	Independent
Dariapur Kazipur	None	T. J. Patel	Indian National Congress
Asarva	None	M. T. Shukla	Indian National Congress
Khadia	None	M. G. Shastri	Praja Socialist Party
Kalupur	None	M. H. Palkhiwala	Independent
Shahpur	None	S. C. Desai	Independent
Jamalpur	None	A. T. Kundiwala	Swatantra Party
Kankaria	SC	J. G. Parmar	Indian National Congress
Rakhial	None	S. R. Shah	Indian National Congress
Naroda	None	V. Tarachandani	Indian National Congress
Daskroi	None	V. L. Mehta	Swatantra Party
Dehgam	None	M. C. Shah	Swatantra Party
Gandhinagar	None	S. L. Patel	Swatantra Party
Kalol	None	A. B. Thakor	Indian National Congress
Kadi	SC	P. N. Parmar	Swatantra Party
Jotana	None	B. M. Patel	Swatantra Party
Mehsana	None	K. J. Yagnik	Swatantra Party
Mansa	None	C. G. Patel	Swatantra Party
Vijapur	None	G. C. Raval	Indian National Congress
Visnagar	None	S. B. Patel	Indian National Congress
Kheralu	None	V. V. Parikh	Independent
Unjha	None	P. S. Mohanlal	Swatantra Party
Sidhpur	None	P. N. Lallubhai	Indian National Congress
Patan	None	V.m. Trivedi	Indian National Congress
Chanasma	None	B. K. Patel	Swatantra Party
Sami	None	K. H. Chaudhari	Indian National Congress
Radhanpur	None	R. K. Jadeja	Swatantra Party
Vav	SC	J. P. Parmar	Swatantra Party
Deddar	None	G. V. Vaghhela	Indian National Congress
Kankrej	None	J. V. Shah	Indian National Congress
Deesa	None	S. S. Shah	Indian National Congress
Dhanera	None	B. J. Joshi	Swatantra Party
Palanpur	None	A. C. Mehta	Indian National Congress
Danta	None	F. D. Patel	Indian National Congress
Khedbrahma	ST	Jethabhai Rathod	Swatantra Party
Idar	SC	M. R. Bhumbhi	Swatantra Party
Bhiloda	None	A. J. Trivedi	Swatantra Party
Himatnagar	None	D. Himatsinhji	Swatantra Party
Prantij	None	N. A. Jhala	Swatantra Party
Modasa	None	N. S. Patel	Swatantra Party
Bayad	None	L. K. Rahevar	Swatantra Party
Meghraj	None	J. P. Bhatt	Swatantra Party
Santrampur	None	K. K. Parmar	Indian National Congress
Jhalod	SC	H. l. Ninama	Indian National Congress
Limdi	ST	I. M. Hathila	Indian National Congress
Dohad	ST	J. M. Solanki	Indian National Congress
Limkheda	ST	V. B. Pasaya	Swatantra Party
Devgadh Baria	None	Jaideepsinhji	Swatantra Party
Halol	None	A. D. Parmar	Indian National Congress
Kalol	None	V. B. Chohan	Swatantra Party
Godhra	None	G. D. Pathak	Swatantra Party
Salia	None	R. J. Bhatia	Swatantra Party
Shehra	None	P. G. Parmar	Indian National Congress
Lunavada	None	K. B. Dave	Swatantra Party
Balasinor	None	N. K. Solanki	Swatantra Party
Thasra	None	M. D. Desai	Swatantra Party
Kapadwanj	None	K. N. Doshi	Swatantra Party
Kathlal	None	A. K. Parmar	Swatantra Party
Mehmedabad	None	J. H. Jadav	Indian National Congress
Mahudha	None	A. B. Vaghela	Swatantra Party
Nadiad	None	B. J. Patel	Indian National Congress
Anad	None	S. D. Vaghela	Indian National Congress
Umreth	None	U. V. Vadodiya	Swatantra Party
Sarsa	None	B. D. Patel	Swatantra Party
Borsad	None	R. D. Patel	Indian National Congress
Bhadran	None	M. F. Solanki	Indian National Congress
Sojitra	None	I. C. Patel	Indian National Congress
Petlad	None	A. A. Mirza	Indian National Congress
Matar	SC	G. A. Waghela	Indian National Congress
Cambay	None	M. B. Shah	Indian National Congress
Jetpur	ST	M. S. Tadvi	Swatantra Party
Chhotaudaipur	ST	B. G. Tadvi	Indian National Congress
Naswadi	ST	P. U. Bhil	Indian National Congress
Sankheda	None	C. J. Patel	Indian National Congress
Dabhoi	None	N. I. Purohit	Swatantra Party
Waghodia	None	M. G. Pola	Indian National Congress
Savli	None	M. A. Shah	Indian National Congress
Baroda City	None	C. K. Parikh	Swatantra Party
Raopura	None	S. M.Mehta	Praja Socialist Party
Sayajiganj	None	F. P. Gaekwad	Indian National Congress
Baroda Rural	None	K. A. Waghela	Swatantra Party
Padra	None	J. S. Shah	Indian National Congress
Karjan	SC	N. G. Arya	Swatantra Party
Jambusar	None	V. C. Shah	Indian National Congress
Vagra	None	N. M. Kaansara	Indian National Congress
Broach	None	C. M. Bhatt	Indian National Congress
Ankleshwar	None	A. A. Patel	Indian National Congress
Jhagadia	ST	Z. R. Vasava	Indian National Congress
Nandod	ST	H. M. Rajwadi	Indian National Congress
Dediapada	None	C. Bijalbhai	Swatantra Party
Songadh	ST	B. F. Vasave	Swatantra Party
Mandvi	ST	P. D. Patel	Indian National Congress
Mangrol	ST	R. R. Chaudhari	Indian National Congress
Surat City East	None	G. R. Chokhawala	Indian National Congress
Surat City North	None	P. M. Vyas	Indian National Congress
Surat City West	None	M. H. A. S. Golandaz	Indian National Congress
Chorasi	None	U. P. S. Bhatt	Indian National Congress
Olpad	None	H. K. Desai	Indian National Congress
Bardoli	None	B. V. Patel	Indian National Congress
Mahuva	ST	C. N. Rathod	Indian National Congress
Vyara	ST	B. S. Gamit	Indian National Congress
Jalalpore	None	G. C. Patel	Indian National Congress
Navsari	None	S. Y. Unia	Indian National Congress
Gandevi	None	T. M. Desai	Indian National Congress
Chikhli	ST	A. G. Patel	Indian National Congress
Bansda	ST	R. G. Gamit	Praja Socialist Party
Dharampur	ST	B. K.patel	Indian National Congress
Mota Pondha	ST	R. B. Jadav	Indian National Congress
Bulsar	None	K. R. Patel	Indian National Congress
Pardi	ST	U. H. Patel	Indian National Congress
Umbergaon	ST	S. D. Thakaria	Indian National Congress
