= Mohammed Surti =

Indian politician

Member of the Gujarat Legislative Assembly
- In office 1980–1985
- Preceded by: Vyas Popatlal Mulshankar
- Succeeded by: Babubhai Sopariwala
- Constituency: Surat West

Personal details
- Party: Indian National Congress

Mohammed Surti was a leader of the Indian National Congress from Surat in Gujarat. He was a government minister of Gujarat. He was falsely convicted for his involvement in the 1993 Surat bomb blasts and was imprisoned, and he was proven innocent and acquitted after spending 12 years in prison.

Mohammad Surti was a highly respected Islamic scholar who devoted his life to Islamic learning and teaching. He was closely associated with Darul Uloom Deoband and made a lasting contribution to Islamic education. He died at the age of 88 on the 6th of Sha‘bān 2026 (26 January 2026). His funeral was among the largest in the community, reflecting the deep respect and influence he held.

In October 2008, a TADA court in Surat sentenced Mohammad Surti to 20 years in prison. Later on 18 July 2014, The Supreme Court acquitted all the 11 accused convicted for the 1993 Surat bomb blast including Surti. The court observed that the investigating agency did not take the prior permission of the district police chief before recording information for offences under TADA, which was mandatory.

== See also ==
- Communalism (South Asia)
