= August Offer =

1940 offer by the British government to India

The August Offer was an offer made by Viceroy Linlithgow in 1940 promising the expansion of the Viceroy's Executive Council to include more Indians, the establishment of an advisory war council, the giving of full weight to minority opinion, and the recognition of the Indians' right to frame their own constitution after the end of the war. In return, it was hoped that all parties and communities in India would co-operate in Britain's efforts during the Second World War. However, the proposal was rejected by the Indian National Congress.

Moreover, the minorities, especially the All-India Muslim League, were assured that no constitutional scheme was acceptable to the government without their agreement, which thus provided a veto power to the League. As the Offer did not give any clear assurance towards the demand for Pakistan, the Muslim League did not fully accept it. However, it welcomed the emphasis on minority safeguards and the assurance that no future constitutional arrangement would be imposed without minority consent.

== Background ==
In the early stages of World War II, Britain found itself in a precarious position following the fall of France in June 1940. The threat of Nazi Germany loomed large, and the British government sought to secure Indian support for the war effort. The Indian National Congress (INC), led by Mahatma Gandhi, had previously withdrawn from provincial ministries in protest against the lack of consultation regarding India's involvement in the war. In response to the growing demand for Indian self-governance and to garner support, the British government, under Viceroy Lord Linlithgow, announced the August Offer on August 8, 1940.

== August Offer ==
On 8 August 1940, early in the Battle of Britain, the Viceroy of India, Lord Linlithgow, made the so-called "August Offer" at Simla, a fresh proposal promising the expansion of the Executive Council to include more Indians, the establishment of an advisory war council, giving weight to minority opinion, and the recognition of Indians' right to frame their own constitution after the end of the war. In return, it was hoped that all parties and communities in India would cooperate in Britain's war effort.

Linlithgow attempted to solve the Congress-Raj stalemate over popular control of India's defense. Linlithgow prefaced his proposal by reiterating that the differences in ideologies that separated the All-India Muslim League and the Indian National Congress must be bridged before any significant constitutional settlement was made. Nevertheless, the Viceroy announced that the British government was now willing to move forward with governmental changes that would "associate Indian public opinion with the conduct of the war."

Linlithgow was authorized to admit a limited number of Indian politicians to his executive council and to establish a war advisory council that included Princes, politicians and other interests in the national life of India. However, Linlithgow warned the politicians that his proposal did not imply that there would be any revision of the Government of India Act 1935.

The declaration marked an important advance over the existing state of things, as it recognised at least the natural and inherent right of the people of the country to determine the form of their future constitution, and explicitly promised Dominion status.

The following proposals were included:

1. After the war, a representative Indian body would be set up to frame a constitution for India.
2. The Viceroy's Executive Council would be expanded without delay.
3. The minorities were assured that the government would not transfer power "to any system of government whose authority is directly denied by large and powerful elements in Indian national life",

== Political reception ==
The Indian National Congress (INC) reacted negatively to the August Offer. Far from trusting the intentions of the British government, Congress leaders believed the offer was vague, inadequate, and designed mainly to secure Indian cooperation in the war without granting meaningful self-government. At its meeting in Wardha on 21 August 1940, the Congress Working Committee formally rejected the Offer, restating its demand for complete independence. Gandhi remarked that the proposal only widened the gulf between Nationalist India and the British rulers, since it offered no immediate transfer of power and continued to rely on British discretion.

The Muslim League, under Muhammad Ali Jinnah, initially welcomed certain aspects of the Offer, particularly the assurance that no constitutional arrangement would be imposed without the agreement of minorities. This was seen as recognition of the League’s demand for safeguards against what it called Hindu domination. However, the Offer contained no commitment to partition or to the creation of Pakistan. By September 1940, the League formally rejected the proposal, concluding that it did not go far enough to meet its demands for a separate political future for Muslims.

Other groups, such as the Hindu Mahasabha and various princely states, expressed mixed reactions. Some considered the Offer a modest step toward constitutional reform, while others viewed it as insufficient and merely a tactic by the British to retain control during wartime.

== Individual Satyagraha: 1940-41 ==
After the rejection of the August Offer, the Congress faced internal debate. The radicals and leftists within the party pressed for launching a mass civil disobedience movement, but Gandhi opposed this approach. He argued that a large-scale movement at that time risked turning violent and could embarrass Britain during its war effort against Germany. Instead, Gandhi proposed Individual Satyagraha, designed not to demand immediate independence but to affirm the fundamental right to free speech—specifically, the right to oppose India’s involvement in the war without consent. Gandhi communicated this position directly to Viceroy Lord Linlithgow in a meeting on 27 September 1940.

=== Objectives ===
- To affirm the right of free speech and peaceful dissent.
- To express opposition to India’s participation in the war without Indian consent.
- To ensure that non-violence (ahimsa) remained the centerpiece of the movement.

=== Key Participants ===
Gandhi carefully chose the satyagrahis to maintain strict non-violence.

- The first satyagrahi was Acharya Vinoba Bhave, who was arrested after delivering an anti-war speech.
- The second was Jawaharlal Nehru.
- The third was Brahm Dutt, an inmate of Gandhi’s ashram.

Over time, around 25,000 individual satyagrahis participated, and many including the prominent leaders were arrested under the Defence of India Act.

=== Course of the Movement ===
The first phase of the campaign began in October 1940, but as it was not a mass movement, it generated limited public enthusiasm. By December 1940, Gandhi decided to suspend it temporarily. A second phase was launched in January 1941, when participation expanded and roughly 20,000 people were arrested. Despite this, the movement remained restrained in scope compared to earlier mass agitations.

=== Impact ===
Individual Satyagraha did not bring about immediate political concessions. However, it succeeded in keeping nationalist resistance active during the wartime lull and reinforced the principle of non-violent protest. The experience also served as a prelude to the Quit India Movement of 1942, where Indian demands for independence would be pressed more forcefully.

== Sources ==
- August Offer: India's Constitution
