= Amarsinh Chaudhary =

Indian politician

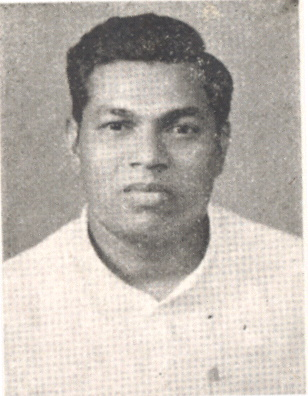

8th Chief Minister of Gujarat
- In office 6 July 1985 – 9 December 1989
- Preceded by: Madhav Singh Solanki
- Succeeded by: Madhav Singh Solanki

Personal details
- Born: 31 July 1941 Surat, Bombay Province, British India
- Died: 15 August 2004 (aged 63) Ahmedabad, Gujarat, India
- Party: Indian National Congress
- Spouse(s): Gajraben and Nisha Gameti
- Children: Tushar Chaudhary, Tejas Chaudhary & Pragnesh Chaudhary

Amarsinh Bhilabhai Chaudhary (31 July 1941 – 15 August 2004) was an Indian politician. He became the first adivasi to serve as the Chief Minister of Gujarat when he took office in 1985.

== Career ==
Chaudhary was a civil engineer and served as government employee for short time. He became a Member of Legislative Assembly from Radhanpur Constituency in 1970. He became a junior minister under Ghanshyam Oza in 1972 and later served as minister in subsequent cabinets. He was elected to Gujarat Vidhan Sabha from Vyara in 1985, and was the Chief Minister of Gujarat from 1985 to 1989. In 1990 Vidhan Sabha elections, he lost to his namesake Amarsinh (Zinabhai) Chaudhary, an independent candidate, from Vyara (Vidhan Sabha constituency). Amarsinh Zinabhai Chaudhary had been elected to Lok Sabha in 1971 from Mandvi on Congress ticket. Amarsinh (Bhilabhai) Chaudhary later served as President of the Gujarat Pradesh Congress Committee between June 2001 and July 2002. In 2002, he was elected to Gujarat Vidhan Sabha from Khedbrahma constituency, and was elected leader of the Congress Legislature Party and leader of opposition in the Gujarat Legislative Assembly. He died in the middle of this term.

== Personal life ==
Amarsinh Chaudhary was married to Gajraben and the couple had 3 children. In 1991, he married his companion Nisha Gameti without divorcing his first wife, and this caused a controversy with his first wife calling Nisha 'a venomous lady'. Nisha, on her part, had divorced her husband, with whom she had two children, in 1990.

His second wife Nisha Chaudhary was elected to Lok Sabha from Sabarkantha thrice in 1990s. She died in 2001. After her death, he refused to contest Lok Sabha election in 2004, saying that he wanted to stay in Gujarat politics. He died a few weeks after the Lok Sabha election.

Politician Tushar Amarsinh Chaudhary is his son.

== Death ==
Chaudhary was admitted to a hospital in Ahmedabad on 24 July 2004 for severe liver and kidney complications. He died of cardiac arrest on 15 August 2004 after a prolonged illness.
