= Vadod, Kathiawar =

Human settlement in Gujarat, India

Vadod is a village and former Rajput non-salute princely state on Saurashtra peninsula in Gujarat, western India.

== History ==
Vadod was a petty princely state in the Gohilwar prant of Eastern Kathiawar, comprising only the village, ruled by Gohil Rajput Chieftains.

It had a population of 814 in 1901, yielding a state revenue of 3,200 Rupees (1903–4, mostly from land) and paying a tribute of 1,102 Rupees, to the Gaekwar Baroda State and Junagadh State.

The village was established in 1751 by Kanaji Gohil, Chieftains Gohil Dynasty, and descender of Late Maharaja Sartanji Raol (Gohil) of Umarala State of Gohilwad. The village was established at the instance of intimate friendships between Sippeh Salar of Muslim Nawab of Junagadh, located at the nearby village of Loliyana, presently situated in Vallabhipur Tehsil of Bhavnagar. The village Vadod has been the under the administration of Tehsildar of Umarala Tehsil today. at the establishment of the village has faced many invasions particulars from Kathi communities. But the gallantry of Gohil ancestors of Chieftains – Lord Kanaji and his sons Karamsinhji & Lakhaji who both of them sacrificed their lives to save the village from robberies and opponents suffered death toll of 18 at the relevant time of fight on invasions. Two warrior sons of Late Kanaji Gohil has assassinated 18 Kathi invaders at that time and thereafter peace and law & order were restored for the village. The village has great market having 30 to 40 Goldsmiths shops at the time, The village has been identified for Dhola Patidar farmers who used cultivating agriculture lands of Lord Kanaji and his ancestors till 1990. Gold and Golden ornaments were famous across the Kathiawar Regions of Vallabhipur, Barwala, Umarala, Dhandhuka province. A very flourishing trade was handled by prudent traders of the village belonging to Lohana Community, Khoja Communities, Vanik Communities, and all these castes were established in Vadod and after the gap of many generation, they moved to urban areas now. Literacy ratio was very poor among the villagers but the intectulity reveals extraordinary well even at present. The sixth generation successor of Lord Kanaji namely Jesabhai (Jaysinh) Gohil was very brilliant and very literate British officers attached at Political Agent of British administration at Wadhawn. His Son Late Kumarsinhji has also followed the same post during the time Britishers. Even today, the family members of Late Kumarsinhji Gohil are highly literate and serving at higher posts. Even today, most of the inhabitants are semi-literate or illiterate and having the profession of farming across the village Vadod.
