= Kantilal Ghia =

Indian politician

1st Deputy Chief Minister of Gujarat
- In office 18 July 1973 – 17 February 1974
- Constituency: Rakhial

Kantilal Ghia was a leader of the Indian National Congress from Gujarat. He was the first deputy chief minister in Government of Gujarat in the early 1970s. He was the MLA for Rakhial after the 1972 Gujarat Legislative Assembly election.
