= Siddharth Patel =

Indian politician

President, Gujarat Pradesh Congress Committee
- In office 2008–2011

Member of Gujarat Legislative Assembly
- In office 1998–2002, 2007 – 2012
- Constituency: Dabhoi

Personal details
- Born: Ahmedabad
- Party: Indian National Congress

Siddharth Chimanbhai Patel is an Indian politician from Gujarat. He was a MLA of Indian National Congress from Dabhoi from 1998 to 2002 and from 2007 to 2012. He is a son of former Chief Minister of Gujarat, Chimanbhai Patel. He is ex-president of GPCC.

He lost in the 2012 Gujarat Legislative Assembly election and again in 2017 from Dabhoi. He lost against Bharatiya Janata Party candidate Shailesh Mehta in 2017.
