= Ghanshyam Oza =

Indian politician

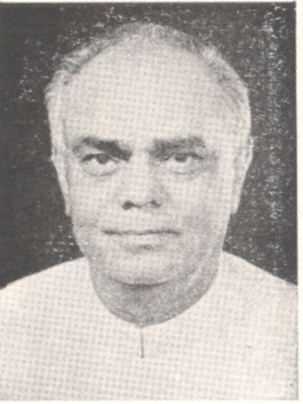

4th Chief Minister of Gujarat
- In office 17 March 1972 – 17 July 1973
- Preceded by: Hitendra Desai
- Succeeded by: Chimanbhai Patel

Member of Parliament, Lok Sabha
- In office 1971–1972
- Preceded by: Minoo Masani
- Succeeded by: Arvind Mohanlal Patel
- Constituency: Rajkot
- In office 1957–1967
- Succeeded by: Meghrajji III
- Constituency: Surendranagar

Member of Parliament, Rajya Sabha
- In office 1978-1984
- Constituency: Gujarat

Personal details
- Born: 25 October 1911 Bombay Presidency, British India
- Died: 12 July 2002 (aged 90) Ahmedabad, Gujarat, India
- Party: Indian National Congress
- Other political affiliations: Janata Party
- Spouse: Ramalaxmi
- Children: Hansa, Rohit, Sharad, Pragna.
- Relatives: Divyang Dave, Dr . Devang Dave (Grandchildren), Bharat Damodardas Trivedi (Nephew)

Ghanshyam Chhotalal Oza (25 October 1911 – 12 July 2002) was the Chief Minister of Gujarat, India from 17 March 1972 to 17 July 1973. He had a B.A. and L.L.B. He was a member of the Legislative Assembly of Saurashtra State from 1948 to 1956. He later became a member of the Legislative Assembly of Bombay state in 1956. He was a member of the Lok Sabha from 1957 to 1967 and again from 1971 to 1972. Later, he was a member of the Rajya Sabha from 10 April 1978 to 9 April 1984. He was a member of the Gujarat Legislative Assembly from 1972-74. He was a minister (1952–56) in U. N. Dhebar ministry when 'United State of Kathiawar' was formed. He became M.P. in 1957 when he won Lok Sabha seat from Surendra Nagar. In a very closely contested Loksabha election of Rajkot constituency in 1971, Ghanshyam Oza defeated Minoo Masani of the (Swatantra party) and became a minister in the cabinet of PM Indira Gandhi.

Oza opposed the emergency imposed by Indira Gandhi, and in the Lok Sabha election of 1977, he worked for the then Janta party under Morarji Desai. He was elected from Gujarat to Rajya Sabha (Janta Party) from 10-04-1978 to 09-04-1984.
