= Rasiklal Umedchand Parikh =

Indian politician

Rasiklal Umedchand Parikh (18 May 1910 – 1 February 1980) was an Indian independence activist and Indian National Congress politician from Gujarat. He served as Chief Minister of Saurashtra State from 1954 to 1956. He served as member of 1st Lok Sabha from Zalawad constituency in 1952 In 2nd Lok Sabha, he was elected from Surendranagar constituency. In 1962, he was MLA from Dasda. He was also a member of 5th Lok Sabha from Surendranagar. He was born at Limbdi and educated at Bombay University and London School of Economics and Political Science. He served as Secretary of Kathiawar Political Conference, 1943-47. He was a Member of the Constituent Assembly of India. He was also a Member of the Saurashtra Legislative Assembly; Minister for Home, Information and P.W.D., Saurashtra, 1948–50; Minister for Home, Ports, Industry 1950-54; Member, Bombay Legislative Assembly; Minister for Revenue, Bombay, 1957–60; Minister for Home and Revenue, Gujarat, 1960–62; Minister for Home and Industry, Gujarat, 1962-63
