= Madhav Singh Solanki =

Indian politician (1927–2021)

Minister of External Affairs
- In office 21 June 1991 – 31 March 1992
- Prime Minister: P.V. Narasimha Rao
- Preceded by: Chandra Shekhar
- Succeeded by: P.V. Narasimha Rao

7th Chief Minister of Gujarat First Madhav Singh Solanki ministry
- In office 24 December 1976 – 10 April 1977
- Preceded by: President's rule
- Succeeded by: Babubhai J. Patel

Chief Minister of Gujarat Second Madhav Singh Solanki ministry
- In office 7 June 1980 – 6 July 1985
- Preceded by: President's rule
- Succeeded by: Amarsinh Chaudhary

Chief Minister of Gujarat Third Madhav Singh Solanki ministry
- In office 10 December 1989 – 4 March 1990
- Preceded by: Amarsinh Chaudhary
- Succeeded by: Chimanbhai Patel

Personal details
- Born: 30 July 1927 Piludara, Baroda State, British India
- Died: 9 January 2021 (aged 93) Gandhinagar, Gujarat, India
- Party: Indian National Congress
- Children: 3

Madhav Singh Solanki (30 July 1927 – 9 January 2021) was a leader of Indian National Congress party who served as External Affairs minister of India. He served also as the Chief Minister of Gujarat three times. He was known for KHAM theory by which he came to power in Gujarat in 1980s. As of 2026, he is last Non-BJP and Congress Chief Minister of Gujarat.

== Early life ==
Madhav was born on 30 July 1927 in a Koli family of Gujarat. His eldest son, Bharatsinh Madhavsinh Solanki, is also a politician.

== Career ==
In 1981, the Government of Gujarat headed by the chief minister Solanki, introduced the reservation for socially and economically backward classes based on recommendations of Bakshi Commission. It resulted in anti-reservation agitation across the state which spilled over in riots resulting in more than hundred deaths. Solanki resigned in 1985 but later returned to power winning 149 out of 182 assembly seats [a record till BJP's victory in 2022 Assembly Elections]. He was supported by Kshatriya, Dalit, Adivasi and Muslims; called collectively as KHAM formula. It resulted in other communities losing the political influence.

== Bofors ==
According to the CBI, Solanki visited Davos in Switzerland in 1992 to attend the World Economic Forum where he allegedly met the Swiss foreign minister Rene Felber and told him that "inquiries conducted into the scam in India had failed to produce any result and that the request for mutual assistance was based on political considerations".

== See also ==
- List of Koli people

Political offices
| Preceded by President's rule | Chief Minister of Gujarat; 24 December 1976 - 10 April 1977 | Succeeded by Babubhai J. Patel |
| Preceded by President's rule | Chief Minister of Gujarat; 7 June 1980 - 6 July 1985 | Succeeded by Amarsinh Chaudhary |
| Preceded by Amarsinh Chaudhary | Chief Minister of Gujarat; 10 December 1989 - 3 March 1990 | Succeeded by Chimanbhai Patel |
| Preceded by Chandra Shekhar | Minister of External Affairs; 21 June 1991 - 31 March 1992 | Succeeded by P. V. Narasimha Rao |
