= Hitendra Kanaiyalal Desai =

Indian politician (1915–1993)

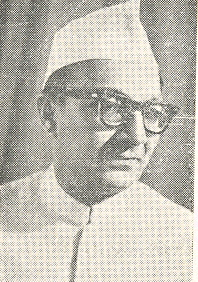

Minister of Commerce
- In office 30 July 1979 – 14 January 1980
- Prime Minister: Charan Singh
- Preceded by: Mohan Dharia
- Succeeded by: Pranab Mukherjee

3rd Chief Minister of Gujarat
- In office 20 September 1965 – 12 May 1971
- Preceded by: Balwantrai Mehta
- Succeeded by: President's rule

Member of Parliament, Lok Sabha
- In office 1977–1980
- Preceded by: Piloo Mody
- Succeeded by: Jaideep Singh
- Constituency: Godhra

Personal details
- Born: 9 August 1915 Surat, Bombay Presidency, British India
- Died: 12 September 1993 (aged 78) Ahmedabad, Gujarat, India
- Party: Indian National Congress Indian National Congress (O)

Hitendra Kanaiyalal Desai (9 August 1915 – 12 September 1993) was an Indian politician who served as the 3rd Chief Minister of Gujarat from 1965 to 1971 and a leader of Indian National Congress and later Indian National Congress (O).

== Political career ==
Desai was born in Surat In a Gujarati Nagar Brahmin family. As a student, he took leading part in debates, sports and other activities at School and College. In 1941-42, he was arrested during the ‘Quit India’ freedom Movement for offering individual Satyagrah and went to jail for one year. He was Education Minister in the reorganised Bombay state.

Hitendra Desai was the Minister of Law in the ministry headed by Dr. Jivraj Narayan Mehta. He was also Minister for Home and Deputy leader of the House. Later, he was the Chief Minister of the state from 20 September 1965 to 12 May 1971. He decided to side with the syndicate after the expulsion of Indira Gandhi from the Congress. The 1969 Gujarat riots occurred during his administration.
