= 1999 Indian general election in Gujarat =

1999 Gujarat General Election

Lok Sabha General elections were held in India between 5 September and 3 October 1999, a few months after the Kargil War. For the first time, a united front of political parties won a majority and formed a non-INC National government that lasted a full term of five years, thus ending a period of political instability at the national level in the country that had been characterized by three general elections held in as many years. In Gujarat, BJP won twenty seats with Congress winning only six seats out of total twenty-six seats.

== Party-wise results summary ==
Party	Seats won
Bharatiya Janata Party	20
Indian National Congress	6

== Results by Party ==
Party Name	Popular vote			Seats		
Party Name	Votes	%	±pp	Contested	Won	+/−
BJP	71,45,614	52.48	▲4.20	26	20	▲1
INC	61,87,113	45.44	▲8.95	26	6	▼1
NCP	71,015	0.52	Steady	7	0	Steady
JD(U)	53,957	0.40	Steady	9	0	Steady
Others	65,847	0.49	Steady	29	0	Steady
IND	91,476	0.67	▼0.46	62	0	Steady
Total	1,36,15,022	100%	-	159	26	-

== Results- Constituency wise ==
Constituency		Winner				Runner Up				Margin	%
#	Name	Candidate	Party	Votes	%	Candidate	Party	Votes	%	Margin	%
1	Kutch	Pushpdan Gadhavi	BJP	191,533	49.91	Babubhai Meghji Shah	INC	187,218	48.78	4,315	1.13
2	Surendranagar	Savshibhai Makwana	INC	244,368	52.11	Bhavna Dave	BJP	218,463	46.59	25,905	5.52
3	Jamnagar	Chandresh Kordia	BJP	190,726	54.08	Raghavji Patel	INC	154,957	43.93	35,769	10.15
4	Rajkot	Kathiriya Ramjibhai	BJP	312,941	57.29	Vitthal Radadiya	INC	226,194	41.41	86,747	15.88
5	Porbandar	Gordhanbhai Javia	BJP	210,627	64.64	Balvantbhai Bachubhai	INC	109,267	33.53	101,360	31.11
6	Junagadh	Bhavna Chikhalia	BJP	266,809	54.20	Jawaharbhai Chavda	INC	219,961	44.68	46,848	9.52
7	Amreli	Dileep Sanghani	BJP	217,670	53.42	Virjibhai Thummar	INC	181,346	44.50	36,324	8.92
8	Bhavnagar	Rajendrasinh Rana	BJP	265,446	61.00	Dilipsinh Gohil	INC	164,093	37.71	101,353	23.29
9	Dhandhuka (SC)	Ratilal Varma	BJP	229,754	49.71	Manubhai Parmar	INC	224,531	48.58	5,223	1.13
10	Ahmedabad	Harin Pathak	BJP	280,696	53.19	Girish Dani	INC	227,728	43.15	52,968	10.04
11	Gandhinagar	L. K. Advani	BJP	453,229	61.14	T. N. Seshan	INC	264,285	35.65	188,944	25.49
12	Mehsana	Atmaram Patel	INC	340,445	54.16	A. K. Patel	BJP	284,710	45.29	55,735	8.87
13	Patan (SC)	Rashtrapal Somabhai	INC	246,798	51.52	Kanodia Mithabhai	BJP	229,671	47.95	17,127	3.57
14	Banaskantha	Haribhai Chaudhary	BJP	308,313	51.97	B. K. Gadhvi	INC	282,337	47.59	25,976	4.38
15	Sabarkantha	Nisha Chaudhary	INC	334,565	50.60	Kanubhai Patel	BJP	320,189	48.43	14,376	2.17
16	Kapadvanj	Shankersinh Vaghela	INC	413,193	62.17	Jaysinhji Chauhan	BJP	247,812	37.29	165,381	24.88
17	Dohad (ST)	Babubhai Katara	BJP	232,288	50.12	Somjibhai Damor	INC	219,857	47.43	12,431	2.69
18	Godhra	Bhupendrasinh Solanki	BJP	280,684	59.32	Shantilal Patel	INC	185,662	39.24	95,022	20.08
19	Kaira	Dinsha Patel	INC	258,024	53.17	Prabhatsinh Chauhan	BJP	224,307	46.22	33,717	6.95
20	Anand	Patel Chimanbhai	BJP	273,683	49.94	Ishwarbhai Chavda	INC	270,022	49.27	3,661	0.67
21	Chhota Udaipur (ST)	Ramsinh Rathwa	BJP	248,970	48.79	Naranbhai Rathwa	INC	247,772	48.56	1,198	0.23
22	Vadodara	Jayaben Thakkar	BJP	322,758	55.17	Urmilaben Patel	INC	230,109	39.33	92,649	15.84
23	Bharuch	Mansukhbhai Vasava	BJP	290,195	49.94	Amarsinh Vasava	INC	243,055	41.83	47,140	8.11
24	Surat	Kashiram Rana	BJP	423,773	68.82	Rupin Patchigar	INC	174,576	28.35	249,197	40.47
25	Mandvi (ST)	Mansinh Patel	BJP	320,172	53.31	Chhitubhai Gamit	INC	263,341	43.85	56,831	9.46
26	Bulsar (ST)	Manibhai Chaudhary	BJP	300,195	51.57	Uttambhai Patel	INC	273,409	46.97	26,786	4.60
