= List of National Democratic Alliance candidates in the 1999 Indian general election =

NDA candidates in 1999 Indian lower house election

National Democratic Alliance is an Indian political party coalition led by Bharatiya Janata Party. For the 1999 Indian general election, the NDA's candidates for the Lok Sabha constituencies are as follows.

== Lok Sabha 1999 general election ==
Constituents of National Democratic Alliance (pre-poll alliance)
Party	Alliance in states	Seats contested	Seats won	
Bharatiya Janata Party	All States and UTs	339	182	Steady
Janata Dal (United)	Bihar; Karnataka; Uttar Pradesh; Kerala; Rajasthan; Lakshadweep	41	21	▲21
Telugu Desam Party	Andhra Pradesh	34	29	▲17
All India Trinamool Congress	West Bengal; Tripura	29	8	▲1
Shiv Sena	Maharashtra	22	15	▲9
Dravida Munnetra Kazhagam	Tamil Nadu	19	12	Steady
Biju Janata Dal	Orissa	12	10	▲1
Shiromani Akali Dal	Punjab	9	2	▼6
Pattali Makkal Katchi	Tamil Nadu; Pondicherry	8	5	▲1
Indian National Lok Dal	Haryana	5	5	▲5
Marumalarchi Dravida Munnetra Kazhagam	Tamil Nadu	5	4	▲1
Akhil Bharatiya Loktantrik Congress	Uttar Pradesh	4	2	▲2
Bihar People's Party	Bihar	2	0	Steady
Himachal Vikas Congress	Himachal Pradesh	1	1	▲1
Manipur State Congress Party	Manipur	1	1	▲1
MGR Anna Dravida Munnetra Kazhagam	Tamil Nadu	1	1	▲1
Sikkim Democratic Front	Sikkim	1	1	Steady
Tamizhaga Rajiv Congress	Tamil Nadu	1	0	
Democratic Bahujan Samaj Morcha	Punjab	1	0	
Arunachal Congress	Arunachal Pradesh	1	0	
Socialist Republican Party	Kerala	1	0	
Maneka Gandhi (independent candidate supported by BJP)	Uttar Pradesh	1	1	Steady
Vanlalzawma (independent candidate supported by BJP)	Mizoram	1	1	▲1
Sansuma Khunggur Bwiswmuthiary (independent candidate supported by BJP)	Assam	1	1	▲1
Pawan Pandey (independent candidate supported by BJP)	Uttar Pradesh	1	0	
Natabar Bagdi (independent candidate supported by BJP)	West Bengal	1	0	
Elwin Teron (independent candidate supported by BJP)	Assam	1	0	
Total NDA candidates		543	302	▲57

== Andhra Pradesh ==
TDP (34) BJP (8)

Constituency No.	Constituency	Reserved for (SC/ST/None)	Candidate	Party	Poll On	Result
1	Srikakulam	None	Kinjarapu Yerran Naidu	Telugu Desam Party		Won
2	Parvathipuram	ST	Dadichiluka Veera Gouri Sankara Rao	Telugu Desam Party		Won
3	Bobbili	None	Padala Aruna	Telugu Desam Party		Lost
4	Visakhapatnam	None	M. V. V. S. Murthi	Telugu Desam Party		Won
5	Bhadrachalam	ST	Dumpa Mary Vijayakumari	Telugu Desam Party		Won
6	Anakapalli	None	Ganta Srinivasa Rao	Telugu Desam Party		Won
7	Kakinada	None	Mudragada Padmanabham	Telugu Desam Party		Won
8	Rajahmundry	None	S. B. P. B. K. Satyanarayana Rao	Bharatiya Janata Party		Won
9	Amalapuram	SC	G. M. C. Balayogi	Telugu Desam Party		Won
10	Narasapur	None	U. V. Krishnam Raju	Bharatiya Janata Party		Won
11	Eluru	None	Bolla Bulli Ramaiah	Telugu Desam Party		Won
12	Machilipatnam	None	Ambati Brahmanaiah	Telugu Desam Party		Won
13	Vijayawada	None	Gadde Ramamohan	Telugu Desam Party		Won
14	Tenali	None	Ummareddy Venkateswarlu	Telugu Desam Party		Won
15	Guntur	None	Yemparala Venkateswara Rao	Telugu Desam Party		Won
16	Bapatla	None	Daggubati Ramanaidu	Telugu Desam Party		Won
17	Narasaraopet	None	S. M. Laljan Basha	Telugu Desam Party		Lost
18	Ongole	None	Karanam Balaram Krishna Murthy	Telugu Desam Party		Won
19	Nellore	SC	Vukkala Rajeswaramma	Telugu Desam Party		Won
20	Tirupathi	SC	Nandipaku Venkataswamy	Bharatiya Janata Party		Won
21	Chittoor	None	Nuthanakalva Ramakrishna Reddy	Telugu Desam Party		Won
22	Rajampet	None	Gunipati Ramaiah	Telugu Desam Party		Won
23	Cuddapah	None	Kandula Rajamohan Reddy	Telugu Desam Party		Lost
24	Hindupur	None	B K Parthasarathi	Telugu Desam Party		Won
25	Anantapur	None	Kalava Srinivasulu	Telugu Desam Party		Won
26	Kurnool	None	K. E. Krishnamurthy	Telugu Desam Party		Won
27	Nandyal	None	Bhuma Nagi Reddy	Telugu Desam Party		Won
28	Nagarkurnool	SC	Manda Jagannath	Telugu Desam Party		Won
29	Mahabubnagar	None	A. P. Jithender Reddy	Bharatiya Janata Party		Won
30	Hyderabad	None	Baddam Bal Reddy	Bharatiya Janata Party		Lost
31	Secunderabad	None	Bandaru Dattatreya	Bharatiya Janata Party		Won
32	Siddipet	SC	Malyala Rajaiah	Telugu Desam Party		Won
33	Medak	None	Ale Narendra	Bharatiya Janata Party		Won
34	Nizamabad	None	Gaddam Ganga Reddy	Telugu Desam Party		Won
35	Adilabad	None	Samudrala Venugopal Chary	Telugu Desam Party		Won
36	Peddapalli	SC	Chellamalla Suguna Kumari	Telugu Desam Party		Won
37	Karimnagar	None	C. Vidyasagar Rao	Bharatiya Janata Party		Won
38	Hanamkonda	None	Chada Suresh Reddy	Telugu Desam Party		Won
39	Warangal	None	Bodakunti Venkateshwarlu	Telugu Desam Party		Won
40	Khammam	None	Baby Swarna Kumari Maddineni	Telugu Desam Party		Lost
41	Nalgonda	None	Gutha Sukender Reddy	Telugu Desam Party		Won
42	Miryalguda	None	Yadevelli Rangasai Reddy	Telugu Desam Party		Lost

== Arunachal Pradesh ==
AC (1) BJP (1)

Constituency No.	Constituency	Reserved for (SC/ST/None)	Candidate	Party	Poll On	Result
1	Arunachal West	None	Omak Apang	Arunachal Congress		Lost
2	Arunachal East	None	Tapir Gao	Bharatiya Janata Party		Lost

== Assam ==
BJP (12) IND (2)

Constituency No.	Constituency	Reserved for (SC/ST/None)	Candidate	Party	Poll On	Result
1	Karimganj	SC	Parimal Suklabaidya	Bharatiya Janata Party		Lost
2	Silchar	None	Kabindra Purkayastha	Bharatiya Janata Party		Lost
3	Autonomous District	ST	Elwin Teron	Independent		Lost
4	Dhubri	None	Pannalal Oswal	Bharatiya Janata Party		Lost
5	Kokrajhar	ST	Sansuma Khunggur Bwiswmuthiary	Independent		Won
6	Barpeta	None	Ramani Kanta Deka	Bharatiya Janata Party		Lost
7	Gauhati	None	Bijoya Chakravarty	Bharatiya Janata Party		Won
8	Mangaldoi	None	Munindra Singha Lahkar	Bharatiya Janata Party		Lost
9	Tezpur	None	Ram Prasad Sharma	Bharatiya Janata Party		Lost
10	Nowgong	None	Rajen Gohain	Bharatiya Janata Party		Won
11	Kaliabor	None	Bhadreswar Tanti	Bharatiya Janata Party		Lost
12	Jorhat	None	Janaki Nath Handique	Bharatiya Janata Party		Lost
13	Dibrugarh	None	Ajit Chaliha	Bharatiya Janata Party		Lost
14	Lakhimpur	None	Uday Shankar Hazarika	Bharatiya Janata Party		Lost

== Bihar ==
BJP (29) JD(U) (23) BPP (2)

Constituency No.	Constituency	Reserved for (SC/ST/None)	Candidate	Party	Poll On	Result
1	Bagaha	SC	Mahendra Baitha	Janata Dal (United)		Won
2	Bettiah	None	Madan Prasad Jaiswal	Bharatiya Janata Party		Won
3	Motihari	None	Radha Mohan Singh	Bharatiya Janata Party		Won
4	Gopalganj	None	Raghunath Jha	Janata Dal (United)		Won
5	Siwan	None	Akhlaque Ahmad	Janata Dal (United)		Lost
6	Maharajganj	None	Prabhunath Singh	Janata Dal (United)		Won
7	Chapra	None	Rajiv Pratap Rudy	Bharatiya Janata Party		Won
8	Hajipur	SC	Ram Vilas Paswan	Janata Dal (United)		Won
9	Vaishali	None	Lovely Anand	Bihar People's Party		Lost
10	Muzaffarpur	None	Jai Narain Prasad Nishad	Janata Dal (United)		Won
11	Sitamarhi	None	Nawal Kishore Rai	Janata Dal (United)		Won
12	Sheohar	None	Anand Mohan Singh	Bihar People's Party		Lost
13	Madhubani	None	Hukmdev Narayan Yadav	Bharatiya Janata Party		Won
14	Jhanjharpur	None	Devendra Prasad Yadav	Janata Dal (United)		Won
15	Darbhanga	None	Kirti Azad	Bharatiya Janata Party		Won
16	Rosera	SC	Ram Chandra Paswan	Janata Dal (United)		Won
17	Samastipur	None	Manjay Lal	Janata Dal (United)		Won
18	Barh	None	Nitish Kumar	Janata Dal (United)		Won
19	Balia	None	Ram Jeevan Singh	Janata Dal (United)		Won
20	Saharsa	None	Dinesh Chandra Yadav	Janata Dal (United)		Won
21	Madhepura	None	Sharad Yadav	Janata Dal (United)		Won
22	Araria	SC	Parmanand Rishidev	Bharatiya Janata Party		Lost
23	Kishanganj	None	Syed Shahnawaz Hussain	Bharatiya Janata Party		Won
24	Purnea	None	Jai Krishna Mandal	Bharatiya Janata Party		Lost
25	Katihar	None	Nikhil Kumar Choudhary	Bharatiya Janata Party		Won
26	Rajmahal	ST	Som Marandi	Bharatiya Janata Party		Lost
27	Dumka	ST	Babulal Marandi	Bharatiya Janata Party		Won
28	Godda	None	Jagadambi Prasad Yadav	Bharatiya Janata Party		Won
29	Banka	None	Digvijay Singh	Janata Dal (United)		Won
30	Bhagalpur	None	Prabhas Chandra Tiwari	Bharatiya Janata Party		Lost
31	Khagaria	None	Renu Kumari Singh	Janata Dal (United)		Won
32	Monghyr	None	Brahmanand Mandal	Janata Dal (United)		Won
33	Begusarai	None	Shyam Sundar Singh	Janata Dal (United)		Lost
34	Nalanda	None	George Fernandes	Janata Dal (United)		Won
35	Patna	None	C. P. Thakur	Bharatiya Janata Party		Won
36	Arrah	None	H. P. Singh	Janata Dal (United)		Lost
37	Buxar	None	Lalmuni Chaubey	Bharatiya Janata Party		Won
38	Sasaram	SC	Muni Lall	Bharatiya Janata Party		Won
39	Bikramganj	None	Vashistha Narain Singh	Janata Dal (United)		Lost
40	Aurangabad	None	Sushil Kumar Singh	Janata Dal (United)		Lost
41	Jahanabad	None	Arun Kumar	Janata Dal (United)		Won
42	Nawada	SC	Sanjay Paswan	Bharatiya Janata Party		Won
43	Gaya	SC	Ramji Manjhi	Bharatiya Janata Party		Won
44	Chatra	None	Dhirendra Agarwal	Bharatiya Janata Party		Lost
45	Kodarma	None	Rati Lal Prasad Verma	Bharatiya Janata Party		Lost
46	Giridih	None	Ravindra Kumar Pandey	Bharatiya Janata Party		Won
47	Dhanbad	None	Rita Verma	Bharatiya Janata Party		Won
48	Hazaribagh	None	Yashwant Sinha	Bharatiya Janata Party		Won
49	Ranchi	None	Ram Tahal Choudhary	Bharatiya Janata Party		Won
50	Jamshedpur	None	Abha Mahato	Bharatiya Janata Party		Won
51	Singhbhum	ST	Laxman Giluwa	Bharatiya Janata Party		Won
52	Khunti	ST	Kariya Munda	Bharatiya Janata Party		Won
53	Lohardaga	ST	Dukha Bhagat	Bharatiya Janata Party		Won
54	Palamu	SC	Braj Mohan Ram	Bharatiya Janata Party		Won

== Goa ==
BJP (2)

Constituency No.	Constituency	Reserved for (SC/ST/None)	Candidate	Party	Poll On	Result
1	Panaji	None	Shripad Yesso Naik	Bharatiya Janata Party		Won
2	Mormugao	None	Ramakant Angle	Bharatiya Janata Party		Won

== Gujarat ==
BJP (26)

Constituency No.	Constituency	Reserved for (SC/ST/None)	Candidate	Party	Poll On	Result
1	Kutch	None	Pushpdan Gadhavi	Bharatiya Janata Party		Won
2	Surendranagar	None	Bhavna Kardam Dave	Bharatiya Janata Party		Lost
3	Jamnagar	None	Chandresh Patel Kordia	Bharatiya Janata Party		Won
4	Rajkot	None	Vallabhbhai Kathiria	Bharatiya Janata Party		Won
5	Porbandar	None	Gordhanbhai Javia	Bharatiya Janata Party		Won
6	Junagadh	None	Bhavna Chikhalia	Bharatiya Janata Party		Won
7	Amreli	None	Dileep Sanghani	Bharatiya Janata Party		Won
8	Bhavnagar	None	Rajendrasinh Rana	Bharatiya Janata Party		Won
9	Dhandhuka	SC	Ratilal Varma	Bharatiya Janata Party		Won
10	Ahmedabad	None	Harin Pathak	Bharatiya Janata Party		Won
11	Gandhinagar	None	L. K. Advani	Bharatiya Janata Party		Won
12	Mehsana	None	A. K. Patel	Bharatiya Janata Party		Lost
13	Patan	SC	Mahesh Kanodia	Bharatiya Janata Party		Lost
14	Banaskantha	None	Haribhai Parthibhai Chaudhary	Bharatiya Janata Party		Won
15	Sabarkantha	None	Kanubhai Patel	Bharatiya Janata Party		Lost
16	Kapadvanj	None	Jaysinhji Chauhan	Bharatiya Janata Party		Lost
17	Dohad	ST	Babubhai Khimabhai Katara	Bharatiya Janata Party		Won
18	Godhra	None	Bhupendrasinh Solanki	Bharatiya Janata Party		Won
19	Kaira	None	Prabhatsinh Chauhan	Bharatiya Janata Party		Lost
20	Anand	None	Dipak Patel	Bharatiya Janata Party		Lost
21	Chhota Udaipur	ST	Ramsinh Rathwa	Bharatiya Janata Party		Won
22	Baroda	None	Jayaben Thakkar	Bharatiya Janata Party		Won
23	Broach	None	Mansukhbhai Vasava	Bharatiya Janata Party		Won
24	Surat	None	Kashiram Rana	Bharatiya Janata Party		Won
25	Mandvi	ST	Mansinh Patel	Bharatiya Janata Party		Won
26	Bulsar	ST	Manibhai Chaudhary	Bharatiya Janata Party		Won

== Haryana ==
BJP (5) INLD (5)

Constituency No.	Constituency	Reserved for (SC/ST/None)	Candidate	Party	Poll On	Result
1	Ambala	SC	Rattan Lal Kataria	Bharatiya Janata Party		Won
2	Kurukshetra	None	Kailasho Devi	Indian National Lok Dal		Won
3	Karnal	None	Ishwar Dayal Swami	Bharatiya Janata Party		Won
4	Sonepat	None	Kishan Singh Sangwan	Bharatiya Janata Party		Won
5	Rohtak	None	Inder Singh	Indian National Lok Dal		Won
6	Faridabad	None	Ram Chander Bainda	Bharatiya Janata Party		Won
7	Mahendragarh	None	Sudha Yadav	Bharatiya Janata Party		Won
8	Bhiwani	None	Ajay Singh Chautala	Indian National Lok Dal		Won
9	Hisar	None	Surender Singh Barwala	Indian National Lok Dal		Won
10	Sirsa	SC	Sushil Kumar Indora	Indian National Lok Dal		Won

== Himachal Pradesh ==
BJP (3) HVC (1)

Constituency No.	Constituency	Reserved for (SC/ST/None)	Candidate	Party	Poll On	Result
1	Simla	SC	Dhani Ram Shandil	Himachal Vikas Congress		Won
2	Mandi	None	Maheshwar Singh	Bharatiya Janata Party		Won
3	Kangra	None	Shanta Kumar	Bharatiya Janata Party		Won
4	Hamirpur	None	Suresh Chandel	Bharatiya Janata Party		Won

== Jammu and Kashmir ==
BJP (6)

Constituency No.	Constituency	Reserved for (SC/ST/None)	Candidate	Party	Poll On	Result
1	Baramulla	None	Mohd Sultan	Bharatiya Janata Party		Lost
2	Srinagar	None	Fayaz Ahamd Bhat	Bharatiya Janata Party		Lost
3	Anantnag	None	Showkat Hussain Yani	Bharatiya Janata Party		Lost
4	Ladakh	None	Sonam Palzor	Bharatiya Janata Party		Lost
5	Udhampur	None	Chaman Lal Gupta	Bharatiya Janata Party		Won
6	Jammu	None	Vishno Datt Sharma	Bharatiya Janata Party		Won

== Karnataka ==
BJP (19) JD(U) (9)

Constituency No.	Constituency	Reserved for (SC/ST/None)	Candidate	Party	Poll On	Result
1	Bidar	SC	Ramchandra Veerappa	Bharatiya Janata Party		Won
2	Gulbarga	None	Basavaraj Patil Sedam	Bharatiya Janata Party		Lost
3	Raichur	None	Abdul Samad Siddiqui	Janata Dal (United)		Lost
4	Koppal	None	Basavaraj Rayareddy	Janata Dal (United)		Lost
5	Bellary	None	Sushma Swaraj	Bharatiya Janata Party		Lost
6	Davanagere	None	G. Mallikarjunappa	Bharatiya Janata Party		Won
7	Chitradurga	None	Shashi Kumar	Janata Dal (United)		Won
8	Tumkur	None	S. Mallikarjunaiah	Bharatiya Janata Party		Lost
9	Chikballapur	None	N Ramesh	Janata Dal (United)		Lost
10	Kolar	SC	G. Mangamma	Bharatiya Janata Party		Lost
11	Kanakapura	None	M. Srinivas	Bharatiya Janata Party		Lost
12	Bangalore North	None	Michael Fernandes	Janata Dal (United)		Lost
13	Bangalore South	None	Ananth Kumar	Bharatiya Janata Party		Won
14	Mandya	None	D. Ramalingaiah	Bharatiya Janata Party		Lost
15	Chamarajanagar	SC	Srinivasa Prasad	Janata Dal (United)		Won
16	Mysore	None	C. H. Vijayashankar	Bharatiya Janata Party		Lost
17	Mangalore	None	V. Dhananjay Kumar	Bharatiya Janata Party		Won
18	Udupi	None	I. M. Jayarama Shetty	Bharatiya Janata Party		Lost
19	Hassan	None	B D Basavaraj	Bharatiya Janata Party		Lost
20	Chikmagalur	None	D. C. Srikantappa	Bharatiya Janata Party		Won
21	Shimoga	None	Ayanur Manjunath	Bharatiya Janata Party		Lost
22	Kanara	None	Anant Kumar Hegde	Bharatiya Janata Party		Lost
23	Dharwad South	None	B.M. Mensinkai	Janata Dal (United)		Lost
24	Dharwad North	None	Vijay Sankeshwar	Bharatiya Janata Party		Won
25	Belgaum	None	Babagouda Patil	Bharatiya Janata Party		Lost
26	Chikkodi	SC	Ramesh Jigajinagi	Janata Dal (United)		Won
27	Bagalkot	None	Ajaykumar Sarnaik	Janata Dal (United)		Lost
28	Bijapur	None	Basangouda Patil Yatnal	Bharatiya Janata Party		Won

== Kerala ==
BJP (14) JD(U) (5) SRP (1)

Constituency No.	Constituency	Reserved for (SC/ST/None)	Candidate	Party	Poll On	Result
1	Kasaragod	None	P. K. Krishna Das	Bharatiya Janata Party		Lost
2	Cannanore	None	N. Hariharan	Janata Dal (United)		Lost
3	Badagara	None	O K Vasu Master	Bharatiya Janata Party		Lost
4	Calicut	None	PC Mohanan Master	Bharatiya Janata Party		Lost
5	Manjeri	None	Kalathingal Mohiyudheen	Janata Dal (United)		Lost
6	Ponnani	None	K. Narayanan	Bharatiya Janata Party		Lost
7	Palghat	None	C. Udai Bhasker	Bharatiya Janata Party		Lost
8	Ottapalam	SC	P. M. Velayudhan	Bharatiya Janata Party		Lost
9	Trichur	None	A.S. Radhakrishnan	Janata Dal (United)		Lost
10	Mukundapuram	None	M.S. Muraleedharan	Socialist Republican Party		Lost
11	Ernakulam	None	ADV. T.D. Rajalakshmi	Bharatiya Janata Party		Lost
12	Muvattupuzha	None	V.V. Augustine	Bharatiya Janata Party		Lost
13	Kottayam	None	ADV. K. R. Surendran	Bharatiya Janata Party		Lost
14	Idukki	None	Tomy Cheruvally	Janata Dal (United)		Lost
15	Alleppey	None	Thiruvarppu Parameswaran Nair	Bharatiya Janata Party		Lost
16	Mavelikara	None	K. Raman Pillai	Bharatiya Janata Party		Lost
17	Adoor	SC	K. Raveendranath	Bharatiya Janata Party		Lost
18	Quilon	None	PROF. Jayalekshmi	Janata Dal (United)		Lost
19	Chirayinkil	None	Padmakumar	Bharatiya Janata Party		Lost
20	Trivandrum	None	O. Rajagopal	Bharatiya Janata Party		Lost

== Madhya Pradesh ==
BJP (40)

Constituency No.	Constituency	Reserved for (SC/ST/None)	Candidate	Party	Poll On	Result
1	Morena	SC	Ashok Argal	Bharatiya Janata Party		Won
2	Bhind	None	Ram Lakhan Singh	Bharatiya Janata Party		Won
3	Gwalior	None	Jaibhan Singh Pawaiya	Bharatiya Janata Party		Won
4	Guna	None	Rao Deshraj Singh Yadav	Bharatiya Janata Party		Lost
5	Sagar	SC	Virendra Kumar	Bharatiya Janata Party		Won
6	Khajuraho	None	Akhand Pratap Singh Yadav	Bharatiya Janata Party		Lost
7	Damoh	None	Ramkrishna Kusmaria	Bharatiya Janata Party		Won
8	Satna	None	Ramanand Singh	Bharatiya Janata Party		Won
9	Rewa	None	Chandramani Tripathi	Bharatiya Janata Party		Lost
10	Sidhi	ST	Chandrapratap Singh	Bharatiya Janata Party		Won
11	Shahdol	ST	Dalpat Singh Paraste	Bharatiya Janata Party		Won
12	Surguja	ST	Larang Sai	Bharatiya Janata Party		Lost
13	Raigarh	ST	Vishnu Deo Sai	Bharatiya Janata Party		Won
14	Janjgir	None	Bansilal Mahato	Bharatiya Janata Party		Lost
15	Bilaspur	SC	Punnulal Mohle	Bharatiya Janata Party		Won
16	Sarangarh	SC	P.R. Khute	Bharatiya Janata Party		Won
17	Raipur	None	Ramesh Bais	Bharatiya Janata Party		Won
18	Mahasamund	None	Chandra Shekhar Sahu	Bharatiya Janata Party		Lost
19	Kanker	ST	Sohan Potai	Bharatiya Janata Party		Won
20	Bastar	ST	Baliram Kashyap	Bharatiya Janata Party		Won
21	Durg	None	Tarachand Sahu	Bharatiya Janata Party		Won
22	Rajnandgaon	None	Raman Singh	Bharatiya Janata Party		Won
23	Balaghat	None	Prahlad Singh Patel	Bharatiya Janata Party		Won
24	Mandla	ST	Faggan Singh Kulaste	Bharatiya Janata Party		Won
25	Jabalpur	None	Jayashree Banerjee	Bharatiya Janata Party		Won
26	Seoni	None	Ram Naresh Tripathi	Bharatiya Janata Party		Won
27	Chhindwara	None	Santosh jain	Bharatiya Janata Party		Lost
28	Betul	None	Vijay Kumar Khandelwal	Bharatiya Janata Party		Won
29	Hoshangabad	None	Sunder Lal Patwa	Bharatiya Janata Party		Won
30	Bhopal	None	Uma Bharti	Bharatiya Janata Party		Won
31	Vidisha	None	Shivraj Singh Chouhan	Bharatiya Janata Party		Won
32	Rajgarh	None	Nitish Bharadwaj	Bharatiya Janata Party		Lost
33	Shajapur	SC	Thawar Chand Gehlot	Bharatiya Janata Party		Won
34	Khandwa	None	Nandkumar Singh Chauhan	Bharatiya Janata Party		Won
35	Khargone	None	Balkrishna Bauji Patidar	Bharatiya Janata Party		Lost
36	Dhar	ST	Harsh Chouhan	Bharatiya Janata Party		Lost
37	Indore	None	Sumitra Mahajan	Bharatiya Janata Party		Won
38	Ujjain	SC	Satyanarayan Jatiya	Bharatiya Janata Party		Won
39	Jhabua	ST	Dileep Singh Bhuria	Bharatiya Janata Party		Lost
40	Mandsaur	None	Laxminarayan Pandey	Bharatiya Janata Party		Won

== Maharashtra ==
BJP (26) SS (22)

Constituency No.	Constituency	Reserved for (SC/ST/None)	Candidate	Party	Poll On	Result
1	Rajapur	None	Suresh Prabhu	Shiv Sena		Won
2	Ratnagiri	None	Anant Geete	Shiv Sena		Won
3	Kolaba	None	D.B. Patil	Shiv Sena		Lost
4	Mumbai South	None	Jayawantiben Mehta	Bharatiya Janata Party		Won
5	Mumbai South Central	None	Mohan Rawale	Shiv Sena		Won
6	Mumbai North Central	None	Manohar Joshi	Shiv Sena		Won
7	Mumbai North East	None	Kirit Somaiya	Bharatiya Janata Party		Won
8	Mumbai North West	None	Madhukar Sarpotdar	Shiv Sena		Lost
9	Mumbai North	None	Ram Naik	Bharatiya Janata Party		Won
10	Thane	None	Prakash Paranjape	Shiv Sena		Won
11	Dahanu	ST	Chintaman Vanaga	Bharatiya Janata Party		Won
12	Nashik	None	Uttamrao Dhikale	Shiv Sena		Won
13	Malegaon	ST	Baban Lahanu Gangurde	Bharatiya Janata Party		Lost
14	Dhule	ST	Ramdas Rupla Gavit	Bharatiya Janata Party		Won
15	Nandurbar	ST	Kuwarsing Fulji Valvi	Bharatiya Janata Party		Lost
16	Erandol	None	Annasaheb M. K. Patil	Bharatiya Janata Party		Won
17	Jalgaon	None	Y. G. Mahajan	Bharatiya Janata Party		Won
18	Buldhana	SC	Anandrao Vithoba Adsul	Shiv Sena		Won
19	Akola	None	Pandurang Fundkar	Bharatiya Janata Party		Lost
20	Washim	None	Bhavana Gawali	Shiv Sena		Won
21	Amravati	None	Anant Gudhe	Shiv Sena		Won
22	Ramtek	None	Subodh Mohite	Shiv Sena		Won
23	Nagpur	None	Vinod Yashwantrao Gudadhe	Bharatiya Janata Party		Lost
24	Bhandara	None	Chunnilal Thakur	Bharatiya Janata Party		Won
25	Chimur	None	Namdeo Diwathe	Bharatiya Janata Party		Won
26	Chandrapur	None	Hansraj Gangaram Ahir	Bharatiya Janata Party		Lost
27	Wardha	None	Suresh Wagmare	Bharatiya Janata Party		Lost
28	Yavatmal	None	Harising Nasaru Rathod	Bharatiya Janata Party		Lost
29	Hingoli	None	Shivaji Mane	Shiv Sena		Won
30	Nanded	None	Dhanajirao Deshmukh	Bharatiya Janata Party		Lost
31	Parbhani	None	Suresh Jadhav	Shiv Sena		Won
32	Jalna	None	Raosaheb Danve	Bharatiya Janata Party		Won
33	Aurangabad	None	Chandrakant Khaire	Shiv Sena		Won
34	Beed	None	Jaisingrao Gaikwad Patil	Bharatiya Janata Party		Won
35	Latur	None	Gopalrao Patil	Bharatiya Janata Party		Lost
36	Osmanabad	SC	Shivaji Kamble	Shiv Sena		Won
37	Sholapur	None	Lingaraj Valyal	Bharatiya Janata Party		Lost
38	Pandharpur	SC	Nagnath Dattatray Kshirsagar	Bharatiya Janata Party		Lost
39	Ahmednagar	None	Dilipkumar Gandhi	Bharatiya Janata Party		Won
40	Kopargaon	None	Balasaheb Vikhe Patil	Shiv Sena		Won
41	Khed	None	Kisanrao Bankhele	Shiv Sena		Lost
42	Pune	None	Pradeep Rawat	Bharatiya Janata Party		Won
43	Baramati	None	Pratibha Lokhande	Bharatiya Janata Party		Lost
44	Satara	None	Hindurao Naik Nimbalkar	Shiv Sena		Lost
45	Karad	None	Mankumare Vasant Dnyandev	Shiv Sena		Lost
46	Sangli	None	Rajendra Dange	Bharatiya Janata Party		Lost
47	Ichalkaranji	None	Pundlik Krishna Jadhav	Shiv Sena		Lost
48	Kolhapur	None	Shivaji Shripati Patil	Shiv Sena		Lost

== Manipur ==
MSCP (1) BJP (1)

Constituency No.	Constituency	Reserved for (SC/ST/None)	Candidate	Party	Poll On	Result
1	Inner Manipur	None	Thounaojam Chaoba Singh	Manipur State Congress Party		Won
2	Outer Manipur	ST	Meijinlung Kamson	Bharatiya Janata Party		Lost

== Meghalaya ==
BJP (2)

Constituency No.	Constituency	Reserved for (SC/ST/None)	Candidate	Party	Poll On	Result
1	Shillong	None	Thrang Hok Rangad	Bharatiya Janata Party		Lost
2	Tura	None	Monendro Agitok	Bharatiya Janata Party		Lost

== Mizoram ==
IND (1)

Constituency No.	Constituency	Reserved for (SC/ST/None)	Candidate	Party	Poll On	Result
1	Mizoram	ST	Vanlalzawma	Independent		Won

== Nagaland ==
BJP (1)

Constituency No.	Constituency	Reserved for (SC/ST/None)	Candidate	Party	Poll On	Result
1	Nagaland	None	Neikhaho	Bharatiya Janata Party		Lost

== Odisha ==
BJD (12) BJP (9)

Constituency No.	Constituency	Reserved for (SC/ST/None)	Candidate	Party	Poll On	Result
1	Mayurbhanj	ST	Salkhan Murmu	Bharatiya Janata Party		Won
2	Balasore	None	Kharabela Swain	Bharatiya Janata Party		Won
3	Bhadrak	SC	Arjun Charan Sethi	Biju Janata Dal		Won
4	Jajpur	SC	Jagannath Mallick	Biju Janata Dal		Won
5	Kendrapara	None	Prabhat Kumar Samantaray	Biju Janata Dal		Won
6	Cuttack	None	Bhartruhari Mahtab	Biju Janata Dal		Won
7	Jagatsinghpur	None	Trilochan Kanungo	Biju Janata Dal		Won
8	Puri	None	Braja Kishore Tripathy	Biju Janata Dal		Won
9	Bhubaneswar	None	Prasanna Kumar Patasani	Biju Janata Dal		Won
10	Aska	None	Naveen Patnaik	Biju Janata Dal		Won
11	Berhampur	None	Anadi Charan Sahu	Bharatiya Janata Party		Won
12	Koraput	ST	Jayaram Pangi	Biju Janata Dal		Lost
13	Nowrangpur	ST	Parsuram Majhi	Bharatiya Janata Party		Won
14	Kalahandi	None	Bikram Keshari Deo	Bharatiya Janata Party		Won
15	Phulbani	SC	Padmanava Behara	Biju Janata Dal		Won
16	Bolangir	None	Sangeeta Kumari Singh Deo	Bharatiya Janata Party		Won
17	Sambalpur	None	Prasanna Acharya	Biju Janata Dal		Won
18	Deogarh	None	Debendra Pradhan	Bharatiya Janata Party		Won
19	Dhenkanal	None	Tathagata Satpathy	Biju Janata Dal		Lost
20	Sundargarh	ST	Jual Oram	Bharatiya Janata Party		Won
21	Keonjhar	ST	Ananta Nayak	Bharatiya Janata Party		Won

== Punjab ==
SAD (9) BJP (3) DBSM (1)

Constituency No.	Constituency	Reserved for (SC/ST/None)	Candidate	Party	Poll On	Result
1	Gurdaspur	None	Vinod Khanna	Bharatiya Janata Party		Won
2	Amritsar	None	Daya Singh Sodhi	Bharatiya Janata Party		Lost
3	Tarn Taran	None	Tarlochan Singh Tur	Shiromani Akali Dal		Won
4	Jullundur	None	Prabhjot Kaur	Shiromani Akali Dal		Lost
5	Phillaur	SC	Satnam Singh Kainth	Democratic Bahujan Samaj Morcha		Lost
6	Hoshiarpur	None	Kamal Chaudhry	Bharatiya Janata Party		Lost
7	Ropar	SC	Satwinder Kaur Dhaliwal	Shiromani Akali Dal		Lost
8	Patiala	None	Surjit Singh Rakhra	Shiromani Akali Dal		Lost
9	Ludhiana	None	Amrik Singh Aliwal	Shiromani Akali Dal		Lost
10	Sangrur	None	Surjit Singh Barnala	Shiromani Akali Dal		Lost
11	Bhatinda	SC	Chatin Singh Samaon	Shiromani Akali Dal		Lost
12	Faridkot	None	Sukhbir Singh Badal	Shiromani Akali Dal		Lost
13	Ferozepur	None	Zora Singh Maan	Shiromani Akali Dal		Won

== Rajasthan ==
BJP (24) JD(U) (1)

Constituency No.	Constituency	Reserved for (SC/ST/None)	Candidate	Party	Poll On	Result
1	Ganganagar	SC	Nihalchand Meghwal	Bharatiya Janata Party		Won
2	Bikaner	None	Rampratap Kasania	Bharatiya Janata Party		Lost
3	Churu	None	Ram Singh Kaswan	Bharatiya Janata Party		Won
4	Jhunjhunu	GEN	Banwari Lal Saini	Bharatiya Janata Party		Lost
5	Sikar	None	Subhash Maharia	Bharatiya Janata Party		Won
6	Jaipur	None	Girdhari Lal Bhargava	Bharatiya Janata Party		Won
7	Dausa	None	Rohitash Kumar Sharma	Bharatiya Janata Party		Lost
8	Alwar	None	Jaswant Singh Yadav	Bharatiya Janata Party		Won
9	Bharatpur	None	Vishvendra Singh	Bharatiya Janata Party		Won
10	Bayana	SC	Bahadur Singh Koli	Bharatiya Janata Party		Won
11	Sawai Madhopur	ST	Jaskaur Meena	Bharatiya Janata Party		Won
12	Ajmer	None	Rasa Singh Rawat	Bharatiya Janata Party		Won
13	Tonk	SC	Shyam Lal Bansiwal	Bharatiya Janata Party		Won
14	Kota	None	Raghuveer Singh Koshal	Bharatiya Janata Party		Won
15	Jhalawar	None	Vasundhara Raje	Bharatiya Janata Party		Won
16	Banswara	ST	Rajesh Katara	Janata Dal (United)		Lost
17	Salumber	ST	Mahaveer Bhagora	Bharatiya Janata Party		Lost
18	Udaipur	None	Shanti Lal Chaplot	Bharatiya Janata Party		Lost
19	Chittorgarh	None	Shrichand Kriplani	Bharatiya Janata Party		Won
20	Bhilwara	None	V. P. Singh Badnore	Bharatiya Janata Party		Won
21	Pali	None	Pusp Jain	Bharatiya Janata Party		Won
22	Jalore	SC	Bangaru Laxman	Bharatiya Janata Party		Lost
23	Barmer	None	Manvendra Singh	Bharatiya Janata Party		Lost
24	Jodhpur	None	Jaswant Singh Bishnoi	Bharatiya Janata Party		Won
25	Nagaur	None	Shyam Sunder Kabra	Bharatiya Janata Party		Lost

== Sikkim ==
SDF (1)

Constituency No.	Constituency	Reserved for (SC/ST/None)	Candidate	Party	Poll On	Result
1	Sikkim	None	Bhim Prasad Dahal	Sikkim Democratic Front		Won

== Tamil Nadu ==
DMK (19) PMK (7) BJP (6) MDMK (5) MADMK (1) TRC (1)

Constituency No.	Constituency	Reserved for (SC/ST/None)	Candidate	Party	Poll On	Result
1	Madras North	None	C. Kuppusami	Dravida Munnetra Kazhagam		Won
2	Madras Central	None	Murasoli Maran	Dravida Munnetra Kazhagam		Won
3	Madras South	None	T. R. Baalu	Dravida Munnetra Kazhagam		Won
4	Sriperumbudur	SC	A. Krishnaswamy	Dravida Munnetra Kazhagam		Won
5	Chengalpattu	None	A. K. Moorthy	Pattali Makkal Katchi		Won
6	Arakkonam	None	S. Jagathrakshakan	Dravida Munnetra Kazhagam		Won
7	Vellore	None	N. T. Shanmugam	Pattali Makkal Katchi		Won
8	Tirupattur	None	D. Venugopal	Dravida Munnetra Kazhagam		Won
9	Vandavasi	None	M. Durai	Pattali Makkal Katchi		Won
10	Tindivanam	None	Gingee N. Ramachandran	Marumalarchi Dravida Munnetra Kazhagam		Won
11	Cuddalore	None	Adhi Sankar	Dravida Munnetra Kazhagam		Won
12	Chidambaram	SC	E. Ponnuswamy	Pattali Makkal Katchi		Won
13	Dharmapuri	None	P. D. Elangovan	Pattali Makkal Katchi		Won
14	Krishnagiri	None	V. Vetriselvam	Dravida Munnetra Kazhagam		Won
15	Rasipuram	SC	S.Uthayarasu	Pattali Makkal Katchi		Lost
16	Salem	None	Vazhappady K. Ramamurthy	Tamizhaga Rajiv Congress		Lost
17	Tiruchengode	None	M. Kannappan	Marumalarchi Dravida Munnetra Kazhagam		Won
18	Nilgiris	None	M Master Mathan	Bharatiya Janata Party		Won
19	Gobichettipalayam	None	K.G.S.Arjunan	Dravida Munnetra Kazhagam		Lost
20	Coimbatore	None	C. P. Radhakrishnan	Bharatiya Janata Party		Won
21	Pollachi	SC	C. Krishnan	Marumalarchi Dravida Munnetra Kazhagam		Won
22	Palani	None	A. Ganeshamurthi	Marumalarchi Dravida Munnetra Kazhagam		Lost
23	Dindigul	None	S. Chandrasekar	Dravida Munnetra Kazhagam		Lost
24	Madurai	None	Pon. Muthuramalingam	Dravida Munnetra Kazhagam		Lost
25	Periyakulam	None	P. Selvendran	Dravida Munnetra Kazhagam		Lost
26	Karur	None	K. C. Palanisamy	Dravida Munnetra Kazhagam		Lost
27	Tiruchirappalli	None	Rangarajan Kumaramangalam	Bharatiya Janata Party		Won
28	Perambalur	SC	A. Raja	Dravida Munnetra Kazhagam		Won
29	Mayiladuthurai	None	P. D. Arul Mozhi	Pattali Makkal Katchi		Lost
30	Nagapattinam	SC	A. K. S. Vijayan	Dravida Munnetra Kazhagam		Won
31	Thanjavur	None	S. S. Palanimanickam	Dravida Munnetra Kazhagam		Won
32	Pudukkottai	None	Su. Thirunavukkarasar	MGR Anna Dravida Munnetra Kazhagam		Won
33	Sivaganga	None	H. Raja	Bharatiya Janata Party		Lost
34	Ramanathapuram	None	M. S. K. Bhavani Rajendran	Dravida Munnetra Kazhagam		Lost
35	Sivakasi	None	Vaiko	Marumalarchi Dravida Munnetra Kazhagam		Won
36	Tirunelveli	None	P. Geetha Jeevan	Dravida Munnetra Kazhagam		Lost
37	Tenkasi	SC	S. Arumugam	Bharatiya Janata Party		Lost
38	Tiruchendur	None	A. D. K. Jayaseelan	Dravida Munnetra Kazhagam		Won
39	Nagercoil	None	Pon Radhakrishnan	Bharatiya Janata Party		Won

== Tripura ==
AITC (1) BJP (1)

Constituency No.	Constituency	Reserved for (SC/ST/None)	Candidate	Party	Poll On	Result
1	Tripura West	None	Sudhir Ranjan Majumdar	All India Trinamool Congress		Lost
2	Tripura East	ST	Jishnu Dev Varma	Bharatiya Janata Party		Lost

== Uttar Pradesh ==
BJP (77) ABLTC (4) JD(U) (2) IND (2)

Constituency No.	Constituency	Reserved for (SC/ST/None)	Candidate	Party	Poll On	Result
1	Tehri Garhwal	None	Manabendra Shah	Bharatiya Janata Party		Won
2	Garhwal	None	B. C. Khanduri	Bharatiya Janata Party		Won
3	Almora	None	Bachi Singh Rawat	Bharatiya Janata Party		Won
4	Nainital	None	Balraj Pasi	Bharatiya Janata Party		Lost
5	Bijnor	SC	Sheesh Ram Singh Ravi	Bharatiya Janata Party		Won
6	Amroha	None	Chetan Chauhan	Bharatiya Janata Party		Lost
7	Moradabad	None	Chandra Vijay Singh	Akhil Bharatiya Loktantrik Congress		Won
8	Rampur	None	Mukhtar Abbas Naqvi	Bharatiya Janata Party		Lost
9	Sambhal	None	Chaudhary Bhupendra Singh	Bharatiya Janata Party		Lost
10	Budaun	None	Shanti Devi Shakya	Bharatiya Janata Party		Lost
11	Aonla	None	Rajveer Singh	Bharatiya Janata Party		Lost
12	Bareilly	None	Santosh Gangwar	Bharatiya Janata Party		Won
13	Pilibhit	None	Maneka Gandhi	Independent		Won
14	Shahjahanpur	None	Satyapal Singh Yadav	Bharatiya Janata Party		Lost
15	Kheri	None	Rajendra Kumar Gupta	Bharatiya Janata Party		Lost
16	Shahabad	None	Raghvendra Singh	Bharatiya Janata Party		Lost
17	Sitapur	None	Janardan Prasad Mishra	Bharatiya Janata Party		Lost
18	Misrikh	SC	Ram Pal Verma	Akhil Bharatiya Loktantrik Congress		Lost
19	Hardoi	SC	Jai Prakash Rawat	Akhil Bharatiya Loktantrik Congress		Won
20	Lucknow	None	Atal Bihari Vajpayee	Bharatiya Janata Party		Won
21	Mohanlalganj	SC	Purnima Verma	Bharatiya Janata Party		Lost
22	Unnao	None	Devi Bux Singh	Bharatiya Janata Party		Lost
23	Raebareli	None	Arun Nehru	Bharatiya Janata Party		Lost
24	Pratapgarh	None	Abhai Pratap Singh	Bharatiya Janata Party		Lost
25	Amethi	None	Sanjaya Sinh	Bharatiya Janata Party		Lost
26	Sultanpur	None	Pawan Pandey	Independent		Lost
27	Akbarpur	SC	Bechan Ram Sonkar	Bharatiya Janata Party		Lost
28	Faizabad	None	Vinay Katiyar	Bharatiya Janata Party		Won
29	Bara Banki	SC	Baij Nath Rawat	Bharatiya Janata Party		Lost
30	Kaiserganj	None	C.P. Chand Singh	Bharatiya Janata Party		Lost
31	Bahraich	None	Padamsen Chaudhary	Bharatiya Janata Party		Won
32	Balrampur	None	Bhishma Shankar Tiwari	Bharatiya Janata Party		Lost
33	Gonda	None	Brij Bhushan Sharan Singh	Bharatiya Janata Party		Won
34	Basti	SC	Sriram Chauhan	Bharatiya Janata Party		Won
35	Domariaganj	None	Ram Pal Singh	Bharatiya Janata Party		Won
36	Khalilabad	None	Ashthabhuja Prasad Shukla	Bharatiya Janata Party		Lost
37	Bansgaon	SC	Raj Narain Passi	Bharatiya Janata Party		Won
38	Gorakhpur	None	Yogi Adityanath	Bharatiya Janata Party		Won
39	Maharajganj	None	Pankaj Choudhary	Bharatiya Janata Party		Lost
40	Padrauna	None	Ram Nagina Mishra	Bharatiya Janata Party		Won
41	Deoria	None	Prakash Mani Tripathi	Bharatiya Janata Party		Won
42	Salempur	None	Hari Kewal Prasad	Janata Dal (United)		Lost
43	Ballia	None	Ram Krishna	Bharatiya Janata Party		Lost
44	Ghosi	None	Siddharth Rai	Janata Dal (United)		Lost
45	Azamgarh	None	Ram Surat	Bharatiya Janata Party		Lost
46	Lalganj	SC	Dayanand	Bharatiya Janata Party		Lost
47	Machhlishahr	None	Ram Vilas Vedanti	Bharatiya Janata Party		Lost
48	Jaunpur	None	Swami Chinmayanand	Bharatiya Janata Party		Won
49	Saidpur	SC	Vijay Sonkar Shastri	Bharatiya Janata Party		Lost
50	Ghazipur	None	Manoj Sinha	Bharatiya Janata Party		Won
51	Chandauli	None	Ananda Ratna Maurya	Bharatiya Janata Party		Lost
52	Varanasi	None	Shankar Prasad Jaiswal	Bharatiya Janata Party		Won
53	Robertsganj	SC	Ram Shakal	Bharatiya Janata Party		Won
54	Mirzapur	None	Virendra Singh	Bharatiya Janata Party		Lost
55	Phulpur	None	Beni Madhav Bind	Bharatiya Janata Party		Lost
56	Allahabad	None	Murli Manohar Joshi	Bharatiya Janata Party		Won
57	Chail	SC	Amrit Lal Bharti	Bharatiya Janata Party		Lost
58	Fatehpur	None	Ashok Kumar Patel	Bharatiya Janata Party		Won
59	Banda	None	Ramesh Chandra Dwivedi	Bharatiya Janata Party		Lost
60	Hamirpur	None	Ganga Charan Rajput	Bharatiya Janata Party		Lost
61	Jhansi	None	Rajendra Agnihotri	Bharatiya Janata Party		Lost
62	Jalaun	SC	Bhanu Pratap Singh Verma	Bharatiya Janata Party		Lost
63	Ghatampur	SC	Kamal Rani Varun	Bharatiya Janata Party		Lost
64	Bilhaur	None	Shyam Bihari Misra	Bharatiya Janata Party		Won
65	Kanpur	None	Jagatvir Singh Drona	Bharatiya Janata Party		Lost
66	Etawah	None	Sukhda Misra	Bharatiya Janata Party		Lost
67	Kannauj	None	Arvind Pratap Singh	Akhil Bharatiya Loktantrik Congress		Lost
68	Farrukhabad	None	Ram Bakhsh Singh Verma	Bharatiya Janata Party		Lost
69	Mainpuri	None	Darshan Singh Yadav	Bharatiya Janata Party		Lost
70	Jalesar	None	Ompal Singh Nidar	Bharatiya Janata Party		Lost
71	Etah	None	Mahadeepak Singh Shakya	Bharatiya Janata Party		Lost
72	Firozabad	SC	Prabhu Dayal Katheria	Bharatiya Janata Party		Lost
73	Agra	None	Bhagwan Shankar Rawat	Bharatiya Janata Party		Lost
74	Mathura	None	Chaudhary Tejveer Singh	Bharatiya Janata Party		Won
75	Hathras	SC	Kishan Lal Diler	Bharatiya Janata Party		Won
76	Aligarh	None	Sheela Gautam	Bharatiya Janata Party		Won
77	Khurja	SC	Ashok Kumar Pradhan	Bharatiya Janata Party		Won
78	Bulandshahr	None	Chhatrapal Singh Lodha	Bharatiya Janata Party		Won
79	Hapur	None	Ramesh Chand Tomar	Bharatiya Janata Party		Won
80	Meerut	None	Amar Pal Singh	Bharatiya Janata Party		Lost
81	Baghpat	None	Sompal Shastri	Bharatiya Janata Party		Lost
82	Muzaffarnagar	None	Sohanveer Singh	Bharatiya Janata Party		Lost
83	Kairana	None	Niranjan Singh Malik	Bharatiya Janata Party		Lost
84	Saharanpur	None	Nakli Singh	Bharatiya Janata Party		Lost
85	Haridwar	SC	Harpal Singh Sathi	Bharatiya Janata Party		Won

== West Bengal ==
AITC (28) BJP (13) IND (1)

Constituency No.	Constituency	Reserved for (SC/ST/None)	Candidate	Party	Poll On	Result
1	Cooch Behar	SC	Ambika Charan Ray	All India Trinamool Congress		Lost
2	Alipurduars	ST	Dhirendra Narjinarai	Bharatiya Janata Party		Lost
3	Jalpaiguri	None	Kalyan Chakraborty	All India Trinamool Congress		Lost
4	Darjeeling	None	Tarun Roy	All India Trinamool Congress		Lost
5	Raiganj	None	Biplab Mitra	All India Trinamool Congress		Lost
6	Balurghat	SC	Subhash Chandra Barman	Bharatiya Janata Party		Lost
7	Malda	None	Muzaffar Khan	Bharatiya Janata Party		Lost
8	Jangipur	None	Syed Mustaque Murshed	All India Trinamool Congress		Lost
9	Murshidabad	None	Sagir Hossain	All India Trinamool Congress		Lost
10	Berhampore	None	Sabyasachi Bagchi	Bharatiya Janata Party		Lost
11	Krishnagar	None	Satyabrata Mookherjee	Bharatiya Janata Party		Won
12	Nabadwip	SC	Ananda Mohan Biswas	All India Trinamool Congress		Won
13	Barasat	None	Ranjit Kumar Panja	All India Trinamool Congress		Won
14	Basirhat	None	Dr. M. Nuruzzaman	All India Trinamool Congress		Lost
15	Joynagar	SC	Krishnapada Majumder	Bharatiya Janata Party		Lost
16	Mathurapur	SC	Gobinda Chandra Naskar	All India Trinamool Congress		Lost
17	Diamond Harbour	None	Sardar Amjad Ali	All India Trinamool Congress		Lost
18	Jadavpur	None	Krishna Bose	All India Trinamool Congress		Won
19	Barrackpore	None	Jayanta Bhattacharya	All India Trinamool Congress		Lost
20	Dum Dum	None	Tapan Sikdar	Bharatiya Janata Party		Won
21	Calcutta North West	None	Sudip Bandyopadhyay	All India Trinamool Congress		Won
22	Calcutta North East	None	Ajit Kumar Panja	All India Trinamool Congress		Won
23	Calcutta South	None	Mamata Banerjee	All India Trinamool Congress		Won
24	Howrah	None	Kakoli Ghosh Dastidar	All India Trinamool Congress		Lost
25	Uluberia	None	Sudipta Roy	All India Trinamool Congress		Won
26	Serampore	None	Akbar Ali Khondkar	All India Trinamool Congress		Lost
27	Hooghly	None	Tapan Dasgupta	All India Trinamool Congress		Lost
28	Arambagh	None	Chunilal Chakraborty	Bharatiya Janata Party		Lost
29	Panskura	None	Gouri Ghosh	All India Trinamool Congress		Lost
30	Tamluk	None	Nirmalendu Bhattacharjee	All India Trinamool Congress		Lost
31	Contai	None	Nitish Sengupta	All India Trinamool Congress		Won
32	Midnapore	None	Manoranjan Dutta	Bharatiya Janata Party		Lost
33	Jhargram	ST	Dakhin Murmu	All India Trinamool Congress		Lost
34	Purulia	None	Tapati Mahato	Bharatiya Janata Party		Lost
35	Bankura	None	Natabar Bagdi	Independent		Lost
36	Vishnupur	SC	Adhibas Duley	All India Trinamool Congress		Lost
37	Durgapur	SC	Anil Kumar Saha	Bharatiya Janata Party		Lost
38	Asansol	None	Moloy Ghatak	All India Trinamool Congress		Lost
39	Burdwan	None	Anup Mukherjee	Bharatiya Janata Party		Lost
40	Katwa	None	Amal Kumar Dutta	All India Trinamool Congress		Lost
41	Bolpur	None	Suniti Chattaraj	All India Trinamool Congress		Lost
42	Birbhum	SC	Madan Lal Choudhury	Bharatiya Janata Party		Lost

== Andaman and Nicobar Islands ==
BJP (1)

Constituency No.	Constituency	Reserved for (SC/ST/None)	Candidate	Party	Poll On	Result
1	Andaman and Nicobar Islands	None	Bishnu Pada Ray	Bharatiya Janata Party		Won

== Chandigarh ==
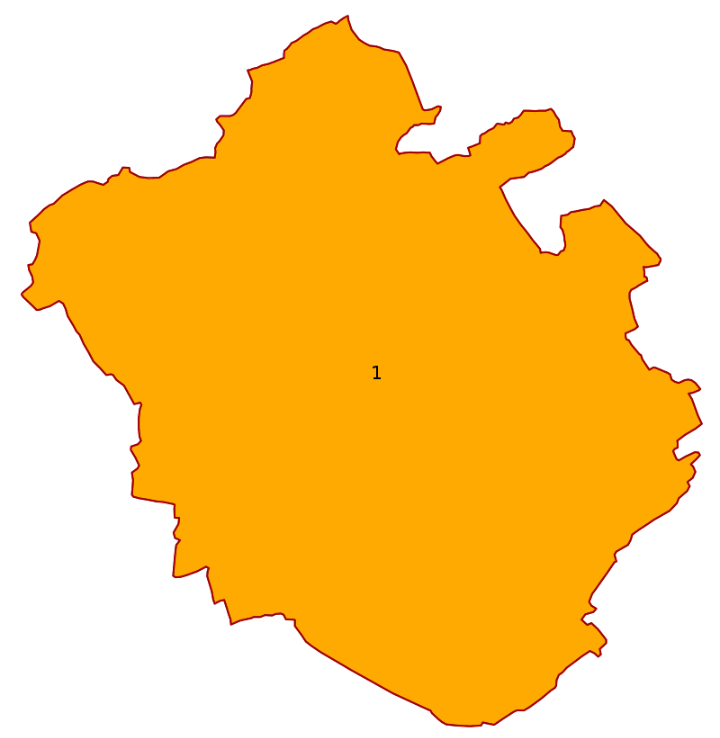

BJP (1)

Constituency No.	Constituency	Reserved for (SC/ST/None)	Candidate	Party	Poll On	Result
1	Chandigarh	None	Satya Pal Jain	Bharatiya Janata Party		Lost

== Dadra and Nagar Haveli ==
BJP (1)

Constituency No.	Constituency	Reserved for (SC/ST/None)	Candidate	Party	Poll On	Result
1	Dadra and Nagar Haveli	None	Dilipbhai N. Bhurkud	Bharatiya Janata Party		Lost

== Daman and Diu ==
BJP (1)

Constituency No.	Constituency	Reserved for (SC/ST/None)	Candidate	Party	Poll On	Result
1	Daman and Diu	None	Devjibhai Tandel	Bharatiya Janata Party		Lost

== Lakshadweep ==
JD(U) (1)

Constituency No.	Constituency	Reserved for (SC/ST/None)	Candidate	Party	Poll On	Result
1	Lakshadweep	ST	K. P. Muthukoya	Janata Dal (United)		Lost

== NCT of Delhi ==
BJP (7)

Constituency No.	Constituency	Reserved for (SC/ST/None)	Candidate	Party	Poll On	Result
1	New Delhi	None	Jagmohan	Bharatiya Janata Party		Won
2	South Delhi	None	Vijay Kumar Malhotra	Bharatiya Janata Party		Won
3	Outer Delhi	None	Sahib Singh Verma	Bharatiya Janata Party		Won
4	East Delhi	None	Lal Bihari Tiwari	Bharatiya Janata Party		Won
5	Chandni Chowk	None	Vijay Goel	Bharatiya Janata Party		Won
6	Delhi Sadar	None	Madan Lal Khurana	Bharatiya Janata Party		Won
7	Karol Bagh	SC	Anita Arya	Bharatiya Janata Party		Won

== Puducherry ==
PMK (1)

Constituency No.	Constituency	Reserved for (SC/ST/None)	Candidate	Party	Poll On	Result
1	Pondicherry	None	M. Ramadass	Pattali Makkal Katchi		Lost

== See also ==
List of National Democratic Alliance candidates in the 1998 Indian general election
List of National Democratic Alliance candidates in the 1999 Indian general election
List of National Democratic Alliance candidates in the 2004 Indian general election
List of National Democratic Alliance candidates in the 2009 Indian general election
List of National Democratic Alliance candidates in the 2014 Indian general election
List of National Democratic Alliance candidates in the 2019 Indian general election
List of National Democratic Alliance candidates in the 2024 Indian general election
