= List of National Democratic Alliance candidates in the 2014 Indian general election =

NDA candidates in 2014 Indian lower house election

National Democratic Alliance is an Indian political party coalition led by Bharatiya Janata Party. For the 2014 Indian general election, the NDA's candidates for the Lok Sabha constituencies are as follows.

== Seat sharing summary ==
Constituents of National Democratic Alliance (Pre-poll Alliance)
#	Party	Alliance in states	Seats sharing	References
1	Bharatiya Janata Party	All States and UTs	428 (425)	
2	Telugu Desam Party	Andhra Pradesh	30	
3	Shiv Sena	Maharashtra	20	
4	Desiya Murpokku Dravida Kazhagam	Tamil Nadu	14	
5	Shiromani Akali Dal	Punjab	10	
6	Pattali Makkal Katchi	Tamil Nadu	8	
7	Marumalarchi Dravida Munnetra Kazhagam	Tamil Nadu	7	
8	Lok Janshakti Party	Bihar	7	
9	Rashtriya Lok Samta Party	Bihar	3	
10	Apna Dal	Uttar Pradesh	2	
11	Haryana Janhit Congress (BL)	Haryana	2	
12	Swabhimani Paksha	Maharashtra	2	
13	Indhiya Jananayaga Katchi	Tamil Nadu	0 (1)	
14	Puthiya Needhi Katchi	Tamil Nadu	0 (1)	
15	Kongunadu Makkal Desia Katchi	Tamil Nadu	0 (1)	
16	All India N.R. Congress	Puducherry	1	
17	Republican Party of India (A)	Maharashtra	1	
18	Rashtriya Samaj Paksha	Maharashtra	1	
19	Revolutionary Socialist Party (Bolshevik)	Kerala	1	
20	Kerala Congress (Nationalist)	Kerala	1	
21	National People's Party	Meghalaya	1	
22	Naga People's Front	Nagaland	1	
23	Mizo National Front	Mizoram	1	
24	Urkhao Gwra Brahma (Independent candidate)	Assam	1	
Total NDA Candidates			542	

== Andhra Pradesh ==
TDP (30) BJP (12)

#	Constituency	Candidate	Party	Poll On	Result
1	Adilabad (ST)	Ramesh Rathod	TDP	30 April 2014	Lost
2	Peddapalli (SC)	Sarath Kumar	TDP	30 April 2014	Lost
3	Karimnagar	C. Vidyasagar Rao	BJP	30 April 2014	Lost
4	Nizamabad	Endela Lakshminarayana	BJP	30 April 2014	Lost
5	Zahirabad	K. Madan Mohan Rao	TDP	30 April 2014	Lost
6	Medak	Chagendla Narendranath	BJP	30 April 2014	Lost
7	Malkajgiri	Malla Reddy	TDP	30 April 2014	Won
8	Secunderabad	Bandaru Dattatreya	BJP	30 April 2014	Won
9	Hyderabad	Bhagawanth Rao	BJP	30 April 2014	Lost
10	Chevella	Tulla Veerender Goud	TDP	30 April 2014	Lost
11	Mahbubnagar	Nagam Janardhana Reddy	BJP	30 April 2014	Lost
12	Nagarkurnool (SC)	Bakkan Narasimhulu	TDP	30 April 2014	Lost
13	Nalgonda	Tera Chinnappa Reddy	TDP	30 April 2014	Lost
14	Bhongir	N. Indrasena Reddy	BJP	30 April 2014	Lost
15	Warangal (SC)	Ramagalla Parameswar	BJP	30 April 2014	Lost
16	Mahabubabad (ST)	Banoth Mohanlal	TDP	30 April 2014	Lost
17	Khammam	Nama Nageswara Rao	TDP	30 April 2014	Lost
18	Araku (ST)	Gummadi Sandhyarani	TDP	7 May 2014	Lost
19	Srikakulam	Ram Mohan Naidu	TDP	7 May 2014	Won
20	Vizianagaram	Ashok Gajapathi Raju	TDP	7 May 2014	Won
21	Visakhapatnam	Kambhampati Hari Babu	BJP	7 May 2014	Won
22	Anakapalli	Muttamsetti Srinivasa Rao	TDP	7 May 2014	Won
23	Kakinada	Thota Narasimham	TDP	7 May 2014	Won
24	Amalapuram (SC)	Pandula Ravindra Babu	TDP	7 May 2014	Won
25	Rajahmundry	Murali Mohan	TDP	7 May 2014	Won
26	Naraspur	Gokaraju Ganga Raju	BJP	7 May 2014	Won
27	Eluru	Maganti Venkateswara Rao	TDP	7 May 2014	Won
28	Machilipatnam	Konakalla Narayana	TDP	7 May 2014	Won
29	Vijayawada	Kesineni Srinivas	TDP	7 May 2014	Won
30	Guntur	Galla Jayadev	TDP	7 May 2014	Won
31	Narasaraopet	Rayapati Sambasiva Rao	TDP	7 May 2014	Won
32	Bapatla (SC)	Malyadri Sriram	TDP	7 May 2014	Won
33	Ongole	Magunta Sreenivasulu Reddy	TDP	7 May 2014	Lost
34	Nandyal	N. M. D. Farooq	TDP	7 May 2014	Lost
35	Kurnool	B.T. Naidu	TDP	7 May 2014	Lost
36	Anantapur	J. C. Diwakar Reddy	TDP	7 May 2014	Won
37	Hindupur	Nimmala Kishtappa	TDP	7 May 2014	Won
38	Kadapa	M. Srinivasulu Reddy	TDP	7 May 2014	Lost
39	Nellore	Adala Prabhakara Reddy	TDP	7 May 2014	Lost
40	Tirupati (SC)	Karumanchi Jayaram	BJP	7 May 2014	Lost
41	Rajampet	Daggubati Purandeswari	BJP	7 May 2014	Lost
42	Chittoor (SC)	Naramalli Sivaprasad	TDP	7 May 2014	Won

== Arunachal Pradesh ==
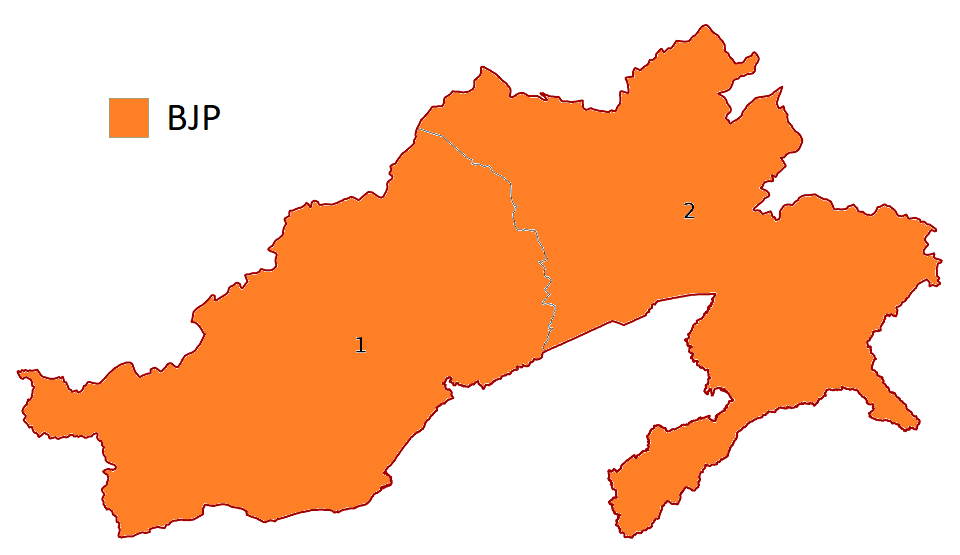
Arunachal Pradesh NDA

BJP (2)

#	Constituency	Candidate	Party	Poll On	Result
1	Arunachal West	Kiren Rijiju	BJP	9 April 2014	Won
2	Arunachal East	Tapir Gao	BJP	9 April 2014	Lost

== Assam ==
BJP (13) IND (1)

#	Constituency	Candidate	Party	Poll On	Result
1	Karimganj (SC)	Krishna Das	BJP	12 April 2014	Lost
2	Silchar	Kabindra Purkayastha	BJP	12 April 2014	Lost
3	Autonomous District (ST)	Joyram Engleng	BJP	12 April 2014	Lost
4	Dhubri	Debomoy Sanyal	BJP	24 April 2014	Lost
5	Kokrajhar (ST)	Urkhao Gwra Brahma	Ind	24 April 2014	Lost
6	Barpeta	Chandra Mohan Patowari	BJP	24 April 2014	Lost
7	Gauhati	Bijoya Chakraborty	BJP	24 April 2014	Won
8	Mangaldoi	Ramen Deka	BJP	24 April 2014	Won
9	Tezpur	Ram Prasad Sharma	BJP	7 April 2014	Won
10	Nowgong	Rajen Gohain	BJP	24 April 2014	Won
11	Kaliabor	Mrinal Kumar Saikia	BJP	7 April 2014	Lost
12	Jorhat	Kamakhya Prasad Tasa	BJP	7 April 2014	Won
13	Dibrugarh	Rameswar Teli	BJP	7 April 2014	Won
14	Lakhimpur	Sarbananda Sonowal	BJP	7 April 2014	Won

== Bihar ==
BJP (30) LJP (7) RLSP (3)

#	Constituency	Candidate	Party	Poll On	Result
1	Valmiki Nagar	Satish Chandra Dubey	BJP	12 May 2014	Won
2	Paschim Champaran	Sanjay Jaiswal	BJP	12 May 2014	Won
3	Purvi Champaran	Radha Mohan Singh	BJP	12 May 2014	Won
4	Sheohar	Rama Devi	BJP	7 May 2014	Won
5	Sitamarhi	Ram Kumar Sharma	RLSP	7 May 2014	Won
6	Madhubani	Hukmdev Narayan Yadav	BJP	30 April 2014	Won
7	Jhanjharpur	Birendra Kumar Chaudhary	BJP	30 April 2014	Won
8	Supaul	Kameshwar Choupal	BJP	24 April 2014	Lost
9	Araria	Pradeep Kumar Singh	BJP	24 April 2014	Lost
10	Kishanganj	Dilip Kumar Jaiswal	BJP	24 April 2014	Lost
11	Katihar	Nikhil Kumar Choudhary	BJP	24 April 2014	Lost
12	Purnia	Uday Singh	BJP	24 April 2014	Lost
13	Madhepura	Vijay Kumar Kushwaha	BJP	30 April 2014	Lost
14	Darbhanga	Kirti Azad	BJP	30 April 2014	Won
15	Muzaffarpur	Ajay Nishad	BJP	7 May 2014	Won
16	Vaishali	Rama Kishore Singh	LJP	12 May 2014	Won
17	Gopalganj (SC)	Janak Ram	BJP	12 May 2014	Won
18	Siwan	Om Prakash Yadav	BJP	12 May 2014	Won
19	Maharajganj	Janardan Singh Sigriwal	BJP	7 May 2014	Won
20	Saran	Rajiv Pratap Rudy	BJP	7 May 2014	Won
21	Hajipur (SC)	Ram Vilas Paswan	LJP	7 May 2014	Won
22	Ujiarpur	Nityanand Rai	BJP	7 May 2014	Won
23	Samastipur (SC)	Ram Chandra Paswan	LJP	30 April 2014	Won
24	Begusarai	Bhola Singh	BJP	30 April 2014	Won
25	Khagaria	Mehboob Ali Kaiser	LJP	30 April 2014	Won
26	Bhagalpur	Shahnawaz Hussain	BJP	24 April 2014	Lost
27	Banka	Putul Devi	BJP	24 April 2014	Lost
28	Munger	Veena Devi	LJP	17 April 2014	Won
29	Nalanda	Satyanand Sharma	LJP	17 April 2014	Lost
30	Patna Sahib	Shatrughan Sinha	BJP	17 April 2014	Won
31	Pataliputra	Ram Kripal Yadav	BJP	17 April 2014	Won
32	Arrah	R. K. Singh	BJP	17 April 2014	Won
33	Buxar	Ashwani Kumar Choubey	BJP	17 April 2014	Won
34	Sasaram (SC)	Chhedi Paswan	BJP	10 April 2014	Won
35	Karakat	Upendra Kushwaha	RLSP	10 April 2014	Won
36	Jahanabad	Arun Kumar	RLSP	17 April 2014	Won
37	Aurangabad	Sushil Kumar Singh	BJP	10 April 2014	Won
38	Gaya (SC)	Hari Manjhi	BJP	10 April 2014	Won
39	Nawada	Giriraj Singh	BJP	10 April 2014	Won
40	Jamui (SC)	Chirag Paswan	LJP	10 April 2014	Won

== Chhattisgarh ==
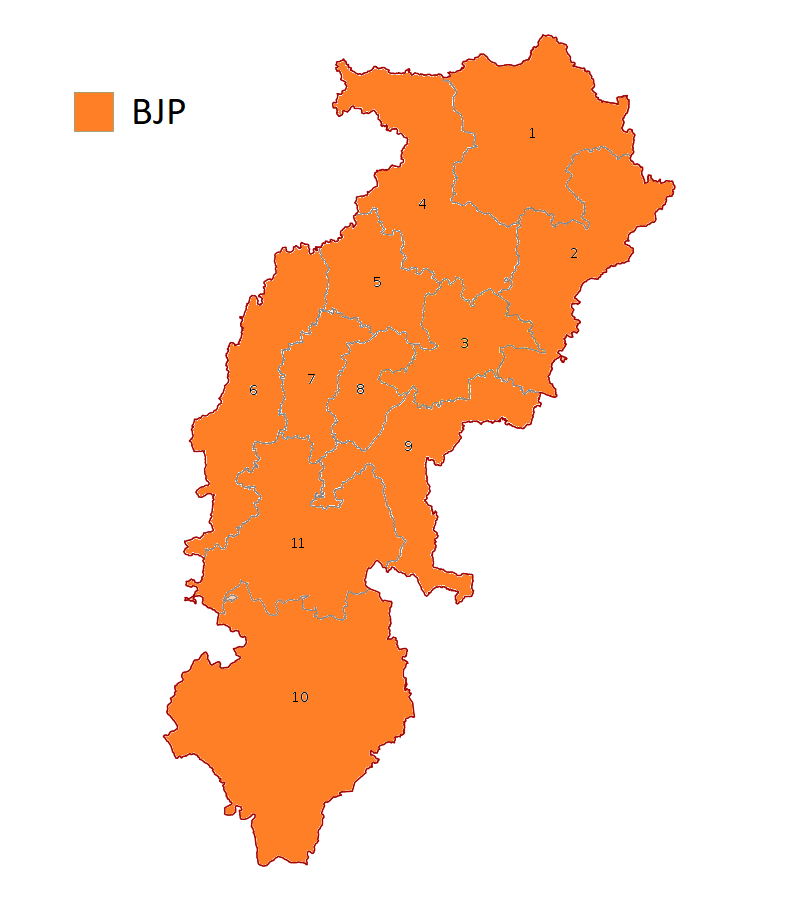
Chhattisgarh NDA

BJP (11)

#	Constituency	Candidate	Party	Poll On	Result
1	Surguja (ST)	Kamalbhan Singh Marabi	BJP	24 April 2014	Won
2	Raigarh (ST)	Vishnudeo Sai	BJP	24 April 2014	Won
3	Janjgir-Champa (SC)	Kamla Devi Patle	BJP	24 April 2014	Won
4	Korba	Banshilal Mahto	BJP	24 April 2014	Won
5	Bilaspur	Lakhan Lal Sahu	BJP	24 April 2014	Won
6	Rajnandgaon	Abhishek Singh	BJP	17 April 2014	Won
7	Durg	Saroj Pandey	BJP	24 April 2014	Lost
8	Raipur	Ramesh Bais	BJP	24 April 2014	Won
9	Mahasamund	Chandu Lal Sahu	BJP	17 April 2014	Won
10	Bastar (ST)	Dinesh Kashyap	BJP	10 April 2014	Won
11	Kanker (ST)	Vikram Usendi	BJP	17 April 2014	Won

== Goa ==
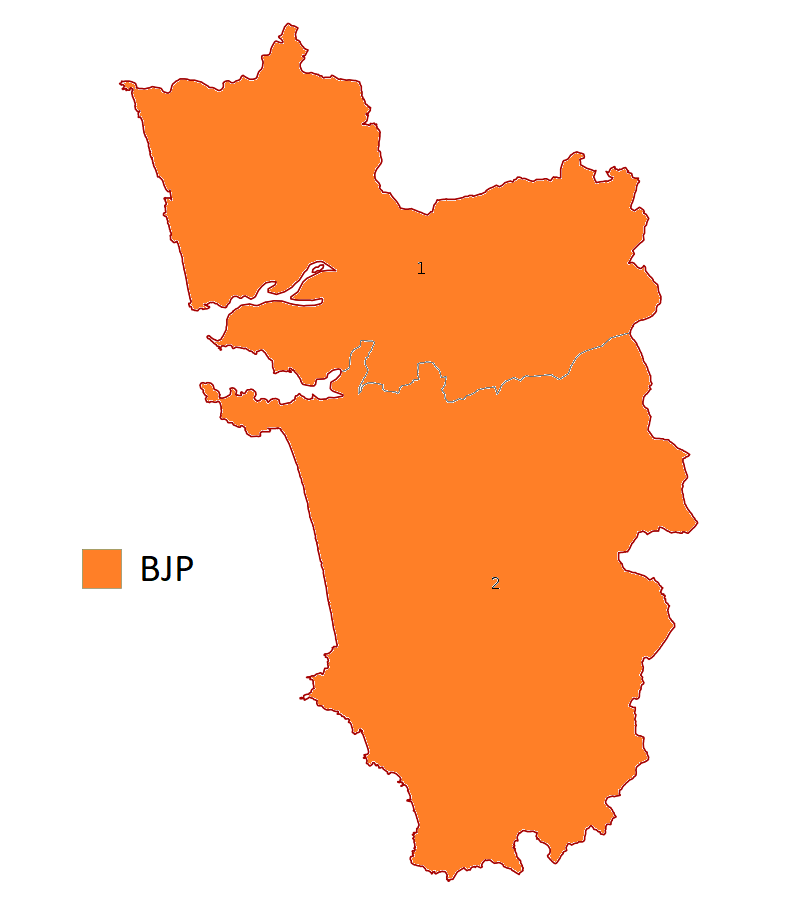
Goa NDA

BJP (2)

#	Constituency	Candidate	Party	Poll On	Result
1	North Goa	Shripad Yesso Naik	BJP	12 April 2014	Won
2	South Goa	Narendra Keshav Sawaikar	BJP	12 April 2014	Won

== Gujarat ==
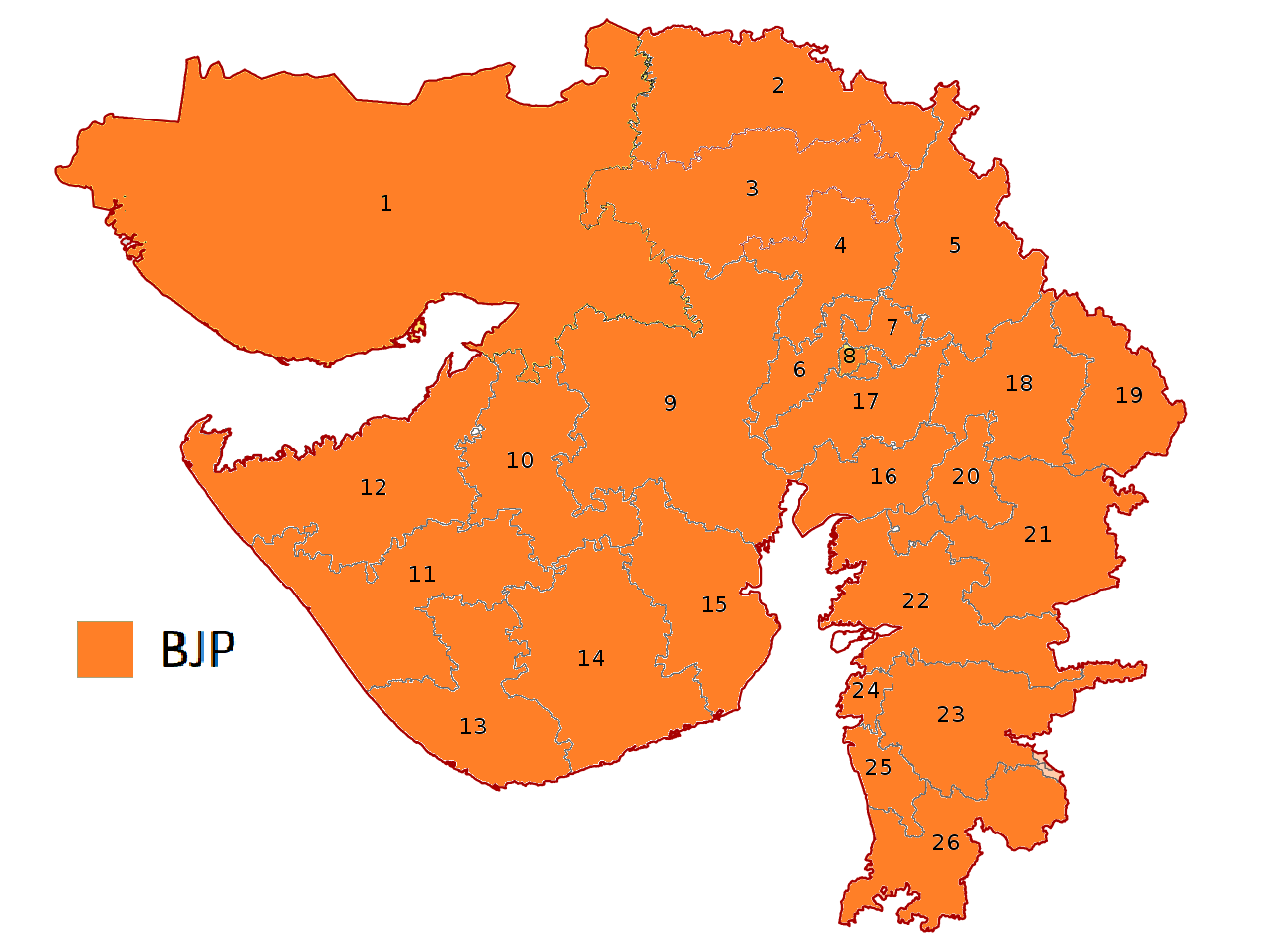
Gujarat NDA

BJP (26)

#	Constituency	Candidate	Party	Poll On	Result
1	Kachchh (SC)	Vinodbhai Chavda	BJP	30 April 2014	Won
2	Banaskantha	Haribhai Chaudhary	BJP	30 April 2014	Won
3	Patan	Liladharbhai Vaghela	BJP	30 April 2014	Won
4	Mahesana	Jayshreeben Patel	BJP	30 April 2014	Won
5	Sabarkantha	Dipsinh Rathod	BJP	30 April 2014	Won
6	Gandhinagar	L. K. Advani	BJP	30 April 2014	Won
7	Ahmedabad East	Paresh Rawal	BJP	30 April 2014	Won
8	Ahmedabad West (SC)	Kirit Solanki	BJP	30 April 2014	Won
9	Surendranagar	Devjibhai Fatepura	BJP	30 April 2014	Won
10	Rajkot	Mohan Kundariya	BJP	30 April 2014	Won
11	Porbandar	Vitthal Radadiya	BJP	30 April 2014	Won
12	Jamnagar	Poonamben Madam	BJP	30 April 2014	Won
13	Junagadh	Rajesh Chudasama	BJP	30 April 2014	Won
14	Amreli	Naranbhai Kachhadia	BJP	30 April 2014	Won
15	Bhavnagar	Bharti Shiyal	BJP	30 April 2014	Won
16	Anand	Dilipbhai Patel	BJP	30 April 2014	Won
17	Kheda	Devusinh Chouhan	BJP	30 April 2014	Won
18	Panchmahal	Prabhatsingh Chouhan	BJP	30 April 2014	Won
19	Dahod (ST)	Jasvantsinh Bhabhor	BJP	30 April 2014	Won
20	Vadodara	Narendra Modi	BJP	30 April 2014	Won
21	Chhota Udaipur (ST)	Ramsinh Rathwa	BJP	30 April 2014	Won
22	Bharuch	Mansukhbhai Vasava	BJP	30 April 2014	Won
23	Bardoli (ST)	Parbhubhai Vasava	BJP	30 April 2014	Won
24	Surat	Darshana Jardosh	BJP	30 April 2014	Won
25	Navsari	C. R. Patil	BJP	30 April 2014	Won
26	Valsad (ST)	K C Patel	BJP	30 April 2014	Won

== Haryana ==
BJP (8) HJC(BL) (2)

#	Constituency	Candidate	Party	Poll On	Result
1	Ambala (SC)	Rattan Lal Kataria	BJP	10 April 2014	Won
2	Kurukshetra	Rajkumar Saini	BJP	10 April 2014	Won
3	Sirsa (SC)	Sushil Indora	HJC	10 April 2014	Lost
4	Hissar	Kuldeep Bishnoi	HJC	10 April 2014	Lost
5	Karnal	Ashwini Kumar Chopra	BJP	10 April 2014	Won
6	Sonepat	Ramesh Chander Kaushik	BJP	10 April 2014	Won
7	Rohtak	Om Prakash Dhankar	BJP	10 April 2014	Lost
8	Bhiwani-Mahendragarh	Dharambir Singh	BJP	10 April 2014	Won
9	Gurgaon	Rao Inderjit Singh	BJP	10 April 2014	Won
10	Faridabad	Krishan Pal Gurjar	BJP	10 April 2014	Won

== Himachal Pradesh ==
BJP (4)

#	Constituency	Candidate	Party	Poll On	Result
1	Kangra	Shanta Kumar	BJP	7 May 2014	Won
2	Mandi	Ram Swaroop Sharma	BJP	7 May 2014	Won
3	Hamirpur	Anurag Thakur	BJP	7 May 2014	Won
4	Shimla (SC)	Virender Kashyap	BJP	7 May 2014	Won

== Jammu and Kashmir ==
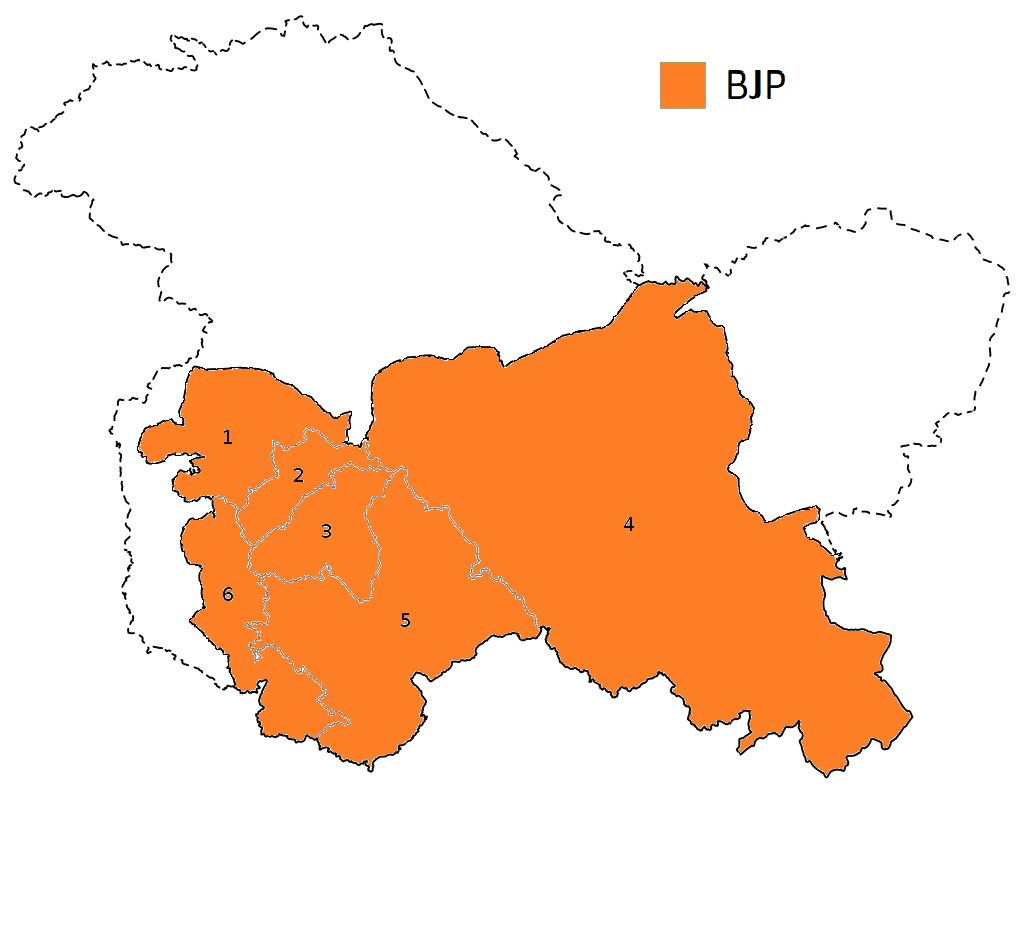
Jammu & Kashmir NDA

BJP (6)

#	Constituency	Candidate	Party	Poll On	Result
1	Baramulla	Gulam Mohammad Meer	BJP	7 May 2014	Lost
2	Srinagar	Fayaz Ahmed Bhat	BJP	30 April 2014	Lost
3	Anantnag	Mushtaq Ahmad Malik	BJP	24 April 2014	Lost
4	Ladakh (ST)	Thupstan Chhewang	BJP	7 May 2014	Won
5	Udhampur	Jitendra Singh	BJP	7 May 2014	Won
6	Jammu	Jugal Kishore Sharma	BJP	10 April 2014	Won

== Jharkhand ==
BJP (14)

#	Constituency	Candidate	Party	Poll On	Result
1	Rajmahal (ST)	Hemlal Murmu	BJP	24 April 2014	Lost
2	Dumka (ST)	Sunil Soren	BJP	24 April 2014	Lost
3	Godda	Nishikant Dubey	BJP	24 April 2014	Won
4	Chatra	Sunil Kumar Singh	BJP	10 April 2014	Won
5	Kodarma	Ravindra Kumar Ray	BJP	10 April 2014	Won
6	Giridih	Ravindra Kumar Pandey	BJP	17 April 2014	Won
7	Dhanbad	Pashupati Nath Singh	BJP	24 April 2014	Won
8	Ranchi	Ram Tahal Choudhary	BJP	17 April 2014	Won
9	Jamshedpur	Bidyut Baran Mahato	BJP	17 April 2014	Won
10	Singhbhum (ST)	Laxman Giluwa	BJP	17 April 2014	Won
11	Khunti (ST)	Kariya Munda	BJP	17 April 2014	Won
12	Lohardaga (ST)	Sudarshan Bhagat	BJP	10 April 2014	Won
13	Palamau (SC)	Vishnu Dayal Ram	BJP	10 April 2014	Won
14	Hazaribagh	Jayant Sinha	BJP	17 April 2014	Won

== Karnataka ==
BJP (28)

#	Constituency	Candidate	Party	Poll On	Result
1	Chikkodi	Ramesh Katti	BJP	17 April 2014	Lost
2	Belgaum	Suresh Angadi	BJP	17 April 2014	Won
3	Bagalkot	P. C. Gaddigoudar	BJP	17 April 2014	Won
4	Bijapur (SC)	Ramesh Jigajinagi	BJP	17 April 2014	Won
5	Gulbarga (SC)	Revu Naik Belamgi	BJP	17 April 2014	Lost
6	Raichur (ST)	K. Shivanagouda Naik	BJP	17 April 2014	Lost
7	Bidar	Bhagwanth Khuba	BJP	17 April 2014	Won
8	Koppal	Karadi Sanganna Amarappa	BJP	17 April 2014	Won
9	Bellary (ST)	B. Sriramulu	BJP	17 April 2014	Won
10	Haveri	Shivakumar Udasi	BJP	17 April 2014	Won
11	Dharwad	Pralhad Joshi	BJP	17 April 2014	Won
12	Uttara Kannada	Anant Kumar Hegde	BJP	17 April 2014	Won
13	Davanagere	G. M. Siddeswara	BJP	17 April 2014	Won
14	Shimoga	B. S. Yeddyurappa	BJP	17 April 2014	Won
15	Udupi Chikmagalur	Shobha Karandlaje	BJP	17 April 2014	Won
16	Hassan	C. H. Vijayashankar	BJP	17 April 2014	Lost
17	Dakshina Kannada	Nalin Kumar Kateel	BJP	17 April 2014	Won
18	Chitradurga (SC)	Janardhana Swamy	BJP	17 April 2014	Lost
19	Tumkur	G. S. Basavaraj	BJP	17 April 2014	Lost
20	Mandya	Shivalingaiah	BJP	17 April 2014	Lost
21	Mysore	Prathap Simha	BJP	17 April 2014	Won
22	Chamarajanagar (SC)	A. R. Krishna Murthy	BJP	17 April 2014	Lost
23	Bangalore Rural	Muniraju Gowda	BJP	17 April 2014	Lost
24	Bangalore North	D. V. Sadananda Gowda	BJP	17 April 2014	Won
25	Bangalore Central	P. C. Mohan	BJP	17 April 2014	Won
26	Bangalore South	Ananth Kumar	BJP	17 April 2014	Won
27	Chikballapur	B. N. Bache Gowda	BJP	17 April 2014	Lost
28	Kolar (SC)	M. Narayanaswamy	BJP	17 April 2014	Lost

== Kerala ==
BJP (18) KC(T) (1) RSP(B) (1)

#	Constituency	Candidate	Party	Poll On	Result
1	Kasaragod	K. Surendran	BJP	10 April 2014	Lost
2	Kannur	P. C. Mohanan Master	BJP	10 April 2014	Lost
3	Vatakara	V. K. Sajeeva	BJP	10 April 2014	Lost
4	Wayanad	P. R. Rasmilnath	BJP	10 April 2014	Lost
5	Kozhikode	C. K. Padmanabhan	BJP	10 April 2014	Lost
6	Malappuram	Sreeprakash	BJP	10 April 2014	Lost
7	Ponnani	K. Narayanan Master	BJP	10 April 2014	Lost
8	Palakkad	Sobha Surendran	BJP	10 April 2014	Lost
9	Alathur (SC)	Shajumon Vattekad	BJP	10 April 2014	Lost
10	Thrissur	K. P. Sreesan	BJP	10 April 2014	Lost
11	Chalakudy	B. Gopalakrishnan	BJP	10 April 2014	Lost
12	Ernakulam	A. N. Radhakrishnan	BJP	10 April 2014	Lost
13	Idukki	Sabu Varghese	BJP	10 April 2014	Lost
14	Kottayam	Noble Mathew	KC(N)	10 April 2014	Lost
15	Alappuzha	A. V. Thamarakshan	RSP(B)	10 April 2014	Lost
16	Mavelikara (SC)	P. Sudheer	BJP	10 April 2014	Lost
17	Pathanamthitta	M. T. Ramesh	BJP	10 April 2014	Lost
18	Kollam	P. M. Velayudhan	BJP	10 April 2014	Lost
19	Attingal	S. Girijakumari	BJP	10 April 2014	Lost
20	Thiruvananthapuram	O. Rajagopal	BJP	10 April 2014	Lost

== Madhya Pradesh ==
BJP (29)

#	Constituency	Candidate	Party	Poll On	Result
1	Morena	Anoop Mishra	BJP	17 April 2014	Won
2	Bhind (SC)	Bhagirath Prasad	BJP	17 April 2014	Won
3	Gwalior	Narendra Singh Tomar	BJP	17 April 2014	Won
4	Guna	Jaibhan Singh Pawaiya	BJP	17 April 2014	Lost
5	Sagar	Laxmi Narayan Yadav	BJP	17 April 2014	Won
6	Tikamgarh (SC)	Virendra Kumar Khatik	BJP	17 April 2014	Won
7	Damoh	Prahlad Singh Patel	BJP	17 April 2014	Won
8	Khajuraho	Nagendra Singh	BJP	17 April 2014	Won
9	Satna	Ganesh Singh	BJP	10 April 2014	Won
10	Rewa	Janardan Mishra	BJP	10 April 2014	Won
11	Sidhi	Riti Pathak	BJP	10 April 2014	Won
12	Shahdol (ST)	Dalpat Singh Paraste	BJP	10 April 2014	Won
13	Jabalpur	Rakesh Singh	BJP	10 April 2014	Won
14	Mandla (ST)	Faggan Singh Kulaste	BJP	10 April 2014	Won
15	Balaghat	Bodh Singh Bhagat	BJP	10 April 2014	Won
16	Chhindwara	Chandrabhan Singh	BJP	10 April 2014	Lost
17	Hoshangabad	Uday Pratap Singh	BJP	10 April 2014	Won
18	Vidisha	Sushma Swaraj	BJP	24 April 2014	Won
19	Bhopal	Alok Sanjar	BJP	17 April 2014	Won
20	Rajgarh	Rodmal Nagar	BJP	17 April 2014	Won
21	Dewas (SC)	Manohar Untwal	BJP	24 April 2014	Won
22	Ujjain (SC)	Chintamani Malviya	BJP	24 April 2014	Won
23	Mandsaur	Sudhir Gupta	BJP	24 April 2014	Won
24	Ratlam (ST)	Dilip Singh Bhuria	BJP	24 April 2014	Won
25	Dhar (ST)	Savitri Thakur	BJP	24 April 2014	Won
26	Indore	Sumitra Mahajan	BJP	24 April 2014	Won
27	Khargone (ST)	Subhash Patel	BJP	24 April 2014	Won
28	Khandwa	Nandkumar Singh Chauhan	BJP	24 April 2014	Won
29	Betul (ST)	Jyoti Dhurve	BJP	24 April 2014	Won

== Maharashtra ==
BJP (24) SS (20) SWP (2) RPI(A) (1) RSP (1)

#	Constituency	Candidate	Party	Poll On	Result
1	Nandurbar (ST)	Heena Gavit	BJP	24 April 2014	Won
2	Dhule	Subhash Bhamre	BJP	24 April 2014	Won
3	Jalgaon	Ashok Tapiram Patil	BJP	24 April 2014	Won
4	Raver	Raksha Khadse	BJP	24 April 2014	Won
5	Buldhana	Prataprao Jadhav	SHS	10 April 2014	Won
6	Akola	Sanjya Dhotre	BJP	10 April 2014	Won
7	Amravati (SC)	Anandrao Adsul	SHS	10 April 2014	Won
8	Wardha	Ramdas Tadas	BJP	10 April 2014	Won
9	Ramtek (SC)	Krupal Tumane	SHS	10 April 2014	Won
10	Nagpur	Nitin Gadkari	BJP	10 April 2014	Won
11	Bhandara-Gondiya	Nana Patole	BJP	10 April 2014	Won
12	Gadchiroli-Chimur (ST)	Ashok Nete	BJP	10 April 2014	Won
13	Chandrapur	Hansraj Ahir	BJP	10 April 2014	Won
14	Yavatmal-Washim	Bhavna Gawli	SHS	10 April 2014	Won
15	Hingoli	Subhash Wankhede	SHS	17 April 2014	Lost
16	Nanded	Dinkar Patil	BJP	17 April 2014	Lost
17	Parbhani	Sanjay Jadhav	SHS	17 April 2014	Won
18	Jalna	Raosaheb Danve	BJP	24 April 2014	Won
19	Aurangabad	Chandrakant Khaire	SHS	24 April 2014	Won
20	Dindori (ST)	Harischandra Chavan	BJP	24 April 2014	Won
21	Nashik	Hemant Godse	SHS	24 April 2014	Won
22	Palghar (ST)	Chintaman Vanga	BJP	24 April 2014	Won
23	Bhiwandi	Kapil Patil	BJP	24 April 2014	Won
24	Kalyan	Shrikant Shinde	SHS	24 April 2014	Won
25	Thane	Rajan Vichare	SHS	24 April 2014	Won
26	Mumbai North	Gopal Shetty	BJP	24 April 2014	Won
27	Mumbai North West	Gajanan Kirtikar	SHS	24 April 2014	Won
28	Mumbai North East	Kirit Somaiya	BJP	24 April 2014	Won
29	Mumbai North Central	Poonam Mahajan	BJP	24 April 2014	Won
30	Mumbai South Central	Rahul Shewale	SHS	24 April 2014	Won
31	Mumbai South	Arvind Sawant	SHS	24 April 2014	Won
32	Raigad	Anant Geete	SHS	24 April 2014	Won
33	Maval	Shrirang Barane	SHS	17 April 2014	Won
34	Pune	Anil Shirole	BJP	17 April 2014	Won
35	Baramati	Mahadev Jankar	RSP	17 April 2014	Lost
36	Shirur	Shivajirao Adhalarao Patil	SHS	17 April 2014	Won
37	Ahmednagar	Dilip Gandhi	BJP	17 April 2014	Won
38	Shirdi (SC)	Sadashiv Lokhande	SHS	17 April 2014	Won
39	Beed	Gopinath Munde	BJP	17 April 2014	Won
40	Osmanabad	Ravindra Gaikwad	SHS	17 April 2014	Won
41	Latur (SC)	Sunil Gaikwad	BJP	17 April 2014	Won
42	Solapur (SC)	Sharad Bansode	BJP	17 April 2014	Won
43	Madha	Sadabhau Khot	SWP	17 April 2014	Lost
44	Sangli	Sanjaykaka Patil	BJP	17 April 2014	Won
45	Satara	Ashok Waman Gaikwad	RPI(A)	17 April 2014	Lost
46	Ratnagiri–Sindhudurg	Vinayak Raut	SHS	17 April 2014	Won
47	Kolhapur	Sanjay Mandlik	SHS	17 April 2014	Lost
48	Hatkanangle	Raju Shetti	SWP	17 April 2014	Won

== Manipur ==
BJP (2)

#	Constituency	Candidate	Party	Poll On	Result
1	Inner Manipur	Rajkumar Ranjan Singh	BJP	9 April 2014	Lost
2	Outer Manipur (ST)	Gangmumei Kamei	BJP	17 April 2014	Lost

== Meghalaya ==
BJP (1) NPP (1)

#	Constituency	Candidate	Party	Poll On	Result
1	Shillong	Shibun Lyngdoh	BJP	9 April 2014	Lost
2	Tura (ST)	P. A. Sangma	NPP	9 April 2014	Won

== Mizoram ==
MNF (1)

#	Constituency	Candidate	Party	Poll On	Result
1	Mizoram (ST)	Robert Romawia Royte	MNF	9 April 2014	Lost

== Nagaland ==
NPF (1)

#	Constituency	Candidate	Party	Poll On	Result
1	Nagaland	Neiphiu Rio	NPF	9 April	Won

== Odisha ==
BJP (21)

#	Constituency	Candidate	Party	Poll On	Result
1	Bargarh	Subash Chauhan	BJP	10 April 2014	Lost
2	Sundargarh (ST)	Jual Oram	BJP	10 April 2014	Won
3	Sambalpur	Suresh Pujari	BJP	10 April 2014	Lost
4	Keonjhar (ST)	Ananta Nayak	BJP	17 April 2014	Lost
5	Mayurbhanj (ST)	Nepol Raghu Murmu	BJP	17 April 2014	Lost
6	Balasore	Pratap Sarangi	BJP	17 April 2014	Lost
7	Bhadrak (SC)	Sarat Dash	BJP	17 April 2014	Lost
8	Jajpur (SC)	Amiya Mallick	BJP	17 April 2014	Lost
9	Dhenkanal	Rudra Narayan Pani	BJP	17 April 2014	Lost
10	Bolangir	Sangeeta Kumari Singh Deo	BJP	10 April 2014	Lost
11	Kalahandi	Pradeep Nayak	BJP	10 April 2014	Lost
12	Nabarangpur (ST)	Parsuram Majhi	BJP	10 April 2014	Lost
13	Kandhamal	Sukanta Panigrahi	BJP	10 April 2014	Lost
14	Cuttack	Sameer Dey	BJP	17 April 2014	Lost
15	Kendrapara	Bishnu Das	BJP	17 April 2014	Lost
16	Jagatsinghpur (SC)	Baidhar Mallik	BJP	17 April 2014	Lost
17	Puri	Ashok Sahu	BJP	17 April 2014	Lost
18	Bhubaneswar	Pruthwiraj Harichandan	BJP	17 April 2014	Lost
19	Aska	Mahesh Mohanty	BJP	10 April 2014	Lost
20	Berhampur	Rama Chandra Panda	BJP	10 April 2014	Lost
21	Koraput (ST)	Shibashankar Ulka	BJP	10 April 2014	Lost

== Punjab ==
SAD (10) BJP (3)

#	Constituency	Candidate	Party	Poll On	Result
1	Gurdaspur	Vinod Khanna	BJP	30 April 2014	Won
2	Amritsar	Arun Jaitley	BJP	30 April 2014	Lost
3	Khadoor Sahib	Ranjit Singh Brahmpura	SAD	30 April 2014	Won
4	Jalandhar (SC)	Pawan Tinoo	SAD	30 April 2014	Lost
5	Hoshiarpur (SC)	Vijay Sampla	BJP	30 April 2014	Won
6	Anandpur Sahib	Prem Singh Chandumajra	SAD	30 April 2014	Won
7	Ludhiana	Manpreet Singh Ayali	SAD	30 April 2014	Lost
8	Fatehgarh Sahib (SC)	Kulwant Singh	SAD	30 April 2014	Lost
9	Faridkot (SC)	Paramjit Kaur Gulshan	SAD	30 April 2014	Lost
10	Firozpur	Sher Singh Ghubaya	SAD	30 April 2014	Won
11	Bathinda	Harsimrat Kaur Badal	SAD	30 April 2014	Won
12	Sangrur	Sukhdev Singh Dhindsa	SAD	30 April 2014	Lost
13	Patiala	Deependra Singh Dhillon	SAD	30 April 2014	Lost

== Rajasthan ==
BJP (25)

#	Constituency	Candidate	Party	Poll On	Result
1	Ganganagar (SC)	Nihalchand Meghwal	BJP	17 April 2014	Won
2	Bikaner (SC)	Arjun Ram Meghwal	BJP	17 April 2014	Won
3	Churu	Rahul Kaswan	BJP	17 April 2014	Won
4	Jhunjhunu	Santosh Ahlawat	BJP	17 April 2014	Won
5	Sikar	Sumedhanand Saraswati	BJP	17 April 2014	Won
6	Jaipur Rural	Rajyavardhan Singh Rathore	BJP	17 April 2014	Won
7	Jaipur	Ramcharan Bohra	BJP	17 April 2014	Won
8	Alwar	Mahant Chandnath	BJP	24 April 2014	Won
9	Bharatpur (SC)	Bahadur Koli	BJP	24 April 2014	Won
10	Karauli-Dholpur (SC)	Manoj Rajoria	BJP	24 April 2014	Won
11	Dausa (ST)	Harish Meena	BJP	24 April 2014	Won
12	Tonk-Sawai Madhopur	Sukhbir Singh Jaunapuria	BJP	24 April 2014	Won
13	Ajmer	Sanwar Lal Jat	BJP	17 April 2014	Won
14	Nagaur	Chhotu Ram Chaudhary	BJP	17 April 2014	Won
15	Pali	Prem Prakash Chaudhary	BJP	17 April 2014	Won
16	Jodhpur	Gajendra Singh Shekhawat	BJP	17 April 2014	Won
17	Barmer	Sonaram Choudhary	BJP	17 April 2014	Won"
18	Jalore	Devji Patel	BJP	17 April 2014	Won
19	Udaipur (ST)	Arjunlal Meena	BJP	17 April 2014	Won
20	Banswara (ST)	Manshankar Ninama	BJP	17 April 2014	Won
21	Chittorgarh	Chandra Prakash Joshi	BJP	17 April 2014	Won
22	Rajsamand	Hariom Singh Rathore	BJP	17 April 2014	Won
23	Bhilwara	Subhash Chandra Baheria	BJP	17 April 2014	Won
24	Kota	Om Birla	BJP	17 April 2014	Won
25	Jhalawar-Baran	Dushyant Singh	BJP	17 April 2014	Won

== Sikkim ==
BJP (1)

#	Constituency	Candidate	Party	Poll On	Result
1	Sikkim	Nar Bahadur Khatiwada	BJP	12 April 2014	Lost

== Tamil Nadu ==
DMDK (14) PMK (8) MDMK (7) BJP (6) NJP (1) KMDK (1) IJK (1)

#	Constituency	Candidate	Party	Poll On	Result
1	Thiruvallur (SC)	V. Yuvaraj	DMDK	24 April 2014	Lost
2	Chennai North	M. Soundarapandian	DMDK	24 April 2014	Lost
3	Chennai South	La. Ganesan	BJP	24 April 2014	Lost
4	Chennai Central	J. Ravindran	DMDK	24 April 2014	Lost
5	Sriperumbudur	R. Masilamani	MDMK	24 April 2014	Lost
6	Kancheepuram (SC)	C. E. Sathya	MDMK	24 April 2014	Lost
7	Arakkonam	R. Velu	PMK	24 April 2014	Lost
8	Vellore	A. C. Shanmugam	NJP	24 April 2014	Lost
9	Krishnagiri	G. K. Mani	PMK	24 April 2014	Lost
10	Dharmapuri	Anbumani Ramadoss	PMK	24 April 2014	Won
11	Tiruvannamalai	Ethiroli Maniyan	PMK	24 April 2014	Lost
12	Arani	A. K. Moorthy	PMK	24 April 2014	Lost
13	Villupuram (SC)	K. Umashankar	DMDK	24 April 2014	Lost
14	Kallakurichi	V. P. Eswaran	DMDK	24 April 2014	Lost
15	Salem	L. K. Sudheesh	DMDK	24 April 2014	Lost
16	Namakkal	S. K. Vel	DMDK	24 April 2014	Lost
17	Erode	A. Ganesha Murthi	MDMK	24 April 2014	Lost
18	Tiruppur	N. Dineshkumar	DMDK	24 April 2014	Lost
19	Nilgiris (SC)	~~S. Gurumoorthy~~	BJP	24 April 2014	Rejected
20	Coimbatore	C. P. Radhakrishnan	BJP	24 April 2014	Lost
21	Pollachi	E. R. Eswaran	KMDK	24 April 2014	Lost
22	Dindigul	A. Krishnamurthy	DMDK	24 April 2014	Lost
23	Karur	N. S. Krishnan	DMDK	24 April 2014	Lost
24	Tiruchirappalli	A. M. G. Vijayakumar	DMDK	24 April 2014	Lost
25	Perambalur	T. R. Paarivendhar	IJK	24 April 2014	Lost
26	Cuddalore	C. R. Jayashankar	DMDK	24 April 2014	Lost
27	Chidambaram (SC)	Sudha Manirathinem	PMK	24 April 2014	Lost
28	Mayiladuthurai	K. Agoram	PMK	24 April 2014	Lost
29	Nagapattinam (SC)	Vadivel Ravanan	PMK	24 April 2014	Lost
30	Thanjavur	Karuappa M. Muruganantham	BJP	24 April 2014	Lost
31	Sivaganga	H. Raja	BJP	24 April 2014	Lost
32	Madurai	T. Sivamuthukumar	DMDK	24 April 2014	Lost
33	Theni	Azhagu Sundharam	MDMK	24 April 2014	Lost
34	Virudhunagar	Vaiko	MDMK	24 April 2014	Lost
35	Ramanathapuram	D. Kuppuramu	BJP	24 April 2014	Lost
36	Thoothukudi	Joel	MDMK	24 April 2014	Lost
37	Tenkasi (SC)	T. Sadhan Tirumalaikumar	MDMK	24 April 2014	Lost
38	Tirunelveli	S. Sivanandha Perumal	DMDK	24 April 2014	Lost
39	Kanyakumari	Pon Radhakrishnan	BJP	24 April 2014	Won

== Tripura ==
BJP (2)

#	Constituency	Candidate	Party	Poll On	Result
1	Tripura West	Sudhindra Chandra Dasgupta	BJP	7 April 2014	Lost
2	Tripura East (ST)	Parikshit Debbarma	BJP	12 April 2014	Lost

== Uttar Pradesh ==
BJP (78) AD (2)

#	Constituency	Candidate	Party	Poll On	Result
1	Saharanpur	Raghav Lakhanpal	BJP	10 April 2014	Won
2	Kairana	Hukum Singh	BJP	10 April 2014	Won
3	Muzaffarnagar	Sanjeev Balyan	BJP	10 April 2014	Won
4	Bijnor	Bhartendu Singh	BJP	10 April 2014	Won
5	Nagina (SC)	Yashwant Singh	BJP	17 April 2014	Won
6	Moradabad	Kunwar Sarvesh Singh	BJP	17 April 2014	Won
7	Rampur	Naipal Singh	BJP	17 April 2014	Won
8	Sambhal	Satyapal Singh Saini	BJP	17 April 2014	Won
9	Amroha	Kanwar Singh Tanwar	BJP	17 April 2014	Won
10	Meerut	Rajendra Agrawal	BJP	10 April 2014	Won
11	Baghpat	Satyapal Singh	BJP	10 April 2014	Won
12	Ghaziabad	General (Retd.) V.K. Singh	BJP	10 April 2014	Won
13	Gautam Buddha Nagar	Mahesh Sharma	BJP	10 April 2014	Won
14	Bulandshahr (SC)	Bhola Singh	BJP	10 April 2014	Won
15	Aligarh	Satish Kumar Gautam	BJP	10 April 2014	Won
16	Hathras (SC)	Rajesh Diwakar	BJP	24 April 2014	Won
17	Mathura	Hema Malini	BJP	24 April 2014	Won
18	Agra (SC)	Ram Shankar Katheria	BJP	24 April 2014	Won
19	Fatehpur Sikri	Choudhary Babulal	BJP	24 April 2014	Won
20	Firozabad	S. P. Singh Baghel	BJP	24 April 2014	Lost
21	Mainpuri	Shatrughan Singh Chauhan	BJP	24 April 2014	Lost
22	Etah	Rajveer Singh	BJP	24 April 2014	Won
23	Badaun	Vagish Pathak	BJP	17 April 2014	Lost
24	Aonla	Dharmendra Kashyap	BJP	17 April 2014	Won
25	Bareilly	Santosh Gangwar	BJP	17 April 2014	Won
26	Pilibhit	Menaka Gandhi	BJP	17 April 2014	Won
27	Shahjahanpur (SC)	Krishna Raj	BJP	17 April 2014	Won
28	Kheri	Ajay Mishra	BJP	17 April 2014	Won
29	Dhaurahra	Rekha Verma	BJP	30 April 2014	Won
30	Sitapur	Rajesh Verma	BJP	30 April 2014	Won
31	Hardoi (SC)	Anshul Verma	BJP	24 April 2014	Won
32	Misrikh (SC)	Anju Bala	BJP	30 April 2014	Won
33	Unnao	HariSakshi Maharaj	BJP	30 April 2014	Won
34	Mohanlalganj (SC)	Kaushal Kishore	BJP	30 April 2014	Won
35	Lucknow	Rajnath Singh	BJP	30 April 2014	Won
36	Rae Bareli	Ajay Aggarwal	BJP	30 April 2014	Lost
37	Amethi	Smriti Irani	BJP	7 May 2014	Lost
38	Sultanpur	Varun Gandhi	BJP	7 May 2014	Won
39	Pratapgarh	Harivansh Singh	AD	7 May 2014	Won
40	Farrukhabad	Mukesh Rajput	BJP	24 April 2014	Won
41	Etawah (SC)	Ashok Doharey	BJP	24 April 2014	Won
42	Kannauj	Subrat Pathak	BJP	24 April 2014	Lost
43	Kanpur Urban	Murli Manohar Joshi	BJP	30 April 2014	Won
44	Akbarpur	Devendra Bhole	BJP	24 April 2014	Won
45	Jalaun (SC)	Bhanu Pratap Singh Verma	BJP	30 April 2014	Won
46	Jhansi	Uma Bharti	BJP	30 April 2014	Won
47	Hamirpur	Pushpendra Singh Chandel	BJP	30 April 2014	Won
48	Banda	Bhairon Prasad Mishra	BJP	30 April 2014	Won
49	Fatehpur	Niranjan Jyoti	BJP	30 April 2014	Won
50	Kaushambi (SC)	Vinod Sonkar	BJP	7 May 2014	Won
51	Phulpur	Keshav Prasad Maurya	BJP	30 April 2014	Won
52	Allahabad	Shyama Charan Gupt	BJP	7 May 2014	Won
53	Barabanki (SC)	Priyanka Singh Rawat	BJP	30 April 2014	Won
54	Faizabad	Lallu Singh	BJP	7 May 2014	Won
55	Ambedkar Nagar	Hari Om Pandey	BJP	7 May 2014	Won
56	Bahraich (SC)	Savitri Bai Phule	BJP	7 May 2014	Won
57	Kaiserganj	Brijbhushan Sharan Singh	BJP	7 May 2014	Won
58	Shrawasti	Daddan Mishra	BJP	7 May 2014	Won
59	Gonda	Kirti Vardhan Singh	BJP	7 May 2014	Won
60	Domariyaganj	Jagdambika Pal	BJP	12 May 2014	Won
61	Basti	Harish Dwivedi	BJP	7 May 2014	Won
62	Sant Kabir Nagar	Sharad Tripathi	BJP	7 May 2014	Won
63	Maharajganj	Pankaj Choudhary	BJP	12 May 2014	Won
64	Gorakhpur	Yogi Adityanath	BJP	12 May 2014	Won
65	Kushi Nagar	Rajesh Pandey	BJP	12 May 2014	Won
66	Deoria	Kalraj Mishra	BJP	12 May 2014	Won
67	Bansgaon (SC)	Kamlesh Paswan	BJP	12 May 2014	Won
68	Lalganj (SC)	Neelam Sonkar	BJP	12 May 2014	Won
69	Azamgarh	Ramakant Yadav	BJP	12 May 2014	Lost
70	Ghosi	Harinarayan Rajbhar	BJP	12 May 2014	Won
71	Salempur	Ravindra Kushawaha	BJP	12 May 2014	Won
72	Ballia	Bharat Singh	BJP	12 May 2014	Won
73	Jaunpur	Krishna Pratap Singh	BJP	12 May 2014	Won
74	Machhlishahr (SC)	Ram Charitra Nishad	BJP	12 May 2014	Won
75	Ghazipur	Manoj Sinha	BJP	12 May 2014	Won
76	Chandauli	Mahendra Nath Pandey	BJP	12 May 2014	Won
77	Varanasi	Narendra Modi	BJP	12 May 2014	Won
78	Bhadohi	Virendra Singh Mast	BJP	7 May 2014	Won
79	Mirzapur	Anupriya Patel	AD	12 May 2014	Won
80	Robertsganj (SC)	Chhote Lal Kharwar	BJP	12 May 2014	Won

== Uttarakhand ==
BJP (5)

#	Constituency	Candidate	Party	Poll On	Result
1	Tehri Garhwal	Mala Rajya Laxmi Shah	BJP	7 May 2014	Won
2	Garhwal	B. C. Khanduri	BJP	7 May 2014	Won
3	Almora (SC)	Ajay Tamta	BJP	7 May 2014	Won
4	Nainital–Udhamsingh Nagar	Bhagat Singh Koshyari	BJP	7 May 2014	Won
5	Haridwar	Ramesh Pokhriyal	BJP	7 May 2014	Won

== West Bengal ==
BJP (42)

#	Constituency	Candidate	Party	Poll On	Result
1	Cooch Behar (SC)	Hemchandra Burman	BJP	17 April 2014	Lost
2	Alipurduars (ST)	Birendra Bora Oraon	BJP	17 April 2014	Lost
3	Jalpaiguri (SC)	Satyalal Sarkar	BJP	17 April 2014	Lost
4	Darjeeling	S. S. Ahluwalia	BJP	17 April 2014	Won
5	Raiganj	Nimu Bhowmick	BJP	24 April 2014	Lost
6	Balurghat	Biswapriya Roychowdhary	BJP	24 April 2014	Lost
7	Maldaha Uttar	Subashkrishna Goswami	BJP	24 April 2014	Lost
8	Maldaha Dakshin	Bishnu Pada Roy	BJP	24 April 2014	Lost
9	Jangipur	Samrat Ghosh	BJP	24 April 2014	Lost
10	Baharampur	Debesh Kumar Adhikari	BJP	12 May 2014	Lost
11	Murshidabad	Sujit Kumar Ghosh	BJP	24 April 2014	Lost
12	Krishnanagar	Satyabrata Mukherjee	BJP	12 May 2014	Lost
13	Ranaghat (SC)	Supravat Biswas	BJP	12 May 2014	Lost
14	Bangaon (SC)	K. D. Biswas	BJP	12 May 2014	Lost
15	Barrackpur	R. K. Handa	BJP	12 May 2014	Lost
16	Dum Dum	Tapan Sikdar	BJP	12 May 2014	Lost
17	Barasat	P. C. Sarkar (Jr.)	BJP	12 May 2014	Lost
18	Basirhat	Samik Bhattacharya	BJP	12 May 2014	Lost
19	Jaynagar (SC)	Biplab Mondal	BJP	12 May 2014	Lost
20	Mathurapur (SC)	Tapan Naskar	BJP	12 May 2014	Lost
21	Diamond Harbour	Avijit Das	BJP	12 May 2014	Lost
22	Jadavpur	Swarup Prashad Ghosh	BJP	12 May 2014	Lost
23	Kolkata Dakshin	Tathagata Roy	BJP	12 May 2014	Lost
24	Kolkata Uttar	Rahul Sinha	BJP	12 May 2014	Lost
25	Howrah	George Baker	BJP	30 April 2014	Lost
26	Uluberia	R. K. Mahanti	BJP	30 April 2014	Lost
27	Sreerampur	Bappi Lahiri	BJP	30 April 2014	Lost
28	Hooghly	Chandan Mitra	BJP	30 April 2014	Lost
29	Arambagh (SC)	Madhusudhan Bag	BJP	30 April 2014	Lost
30	Tamluk	Badsah Alam	BJP	12 May 2014	Lost
31	Kanthi	Kamalendu Pahari	BJP	12 May 2014	Lost
32	Ghatal	Md Alam	BJP	12 May 2014	Lost
33	Jhargram (ST)	Bikash Mudi	BJP	7 May 2014	Lost
34	Medinipur	Prabhakar Tiwari	BJP	7 May 2014	Lost
35	Purulia	Bikash Banerjee	BJP	7 May 2014	Lost
36	Bankura	Subash Sarkar	BJP	7 May 2014	Lost
37	Bishnupur (SC)	Jayanta Mondal	BJP	7 May 2014	Lost
38	Bardhaman Purba (SC)	Santosh Roy	BJP	30 April 2014	Lost
39	Bardhaman-Durgapur	Deboshree Chowdhury	BJP	30 April 2014	Lost
40	Asansol	Babul Supriyo	BJP	7 May 2014	Won
41	Bolpur (SC)	Kamini Mohan Sarkar	BJP	30 April 2014	Lost
42	Birbhum	Joy Banerjee	BJP	30 April 2014	Lost

== Andaman and Nicobar Islands (1) ==
BJP (1)

#	Constituency	Candidate	Party	Poll On	Result
1	Andaman and Nicobar Islands	Bishnu Pada Ray	BJP	10 April 2014	Won

== Chandigarh (1) ==
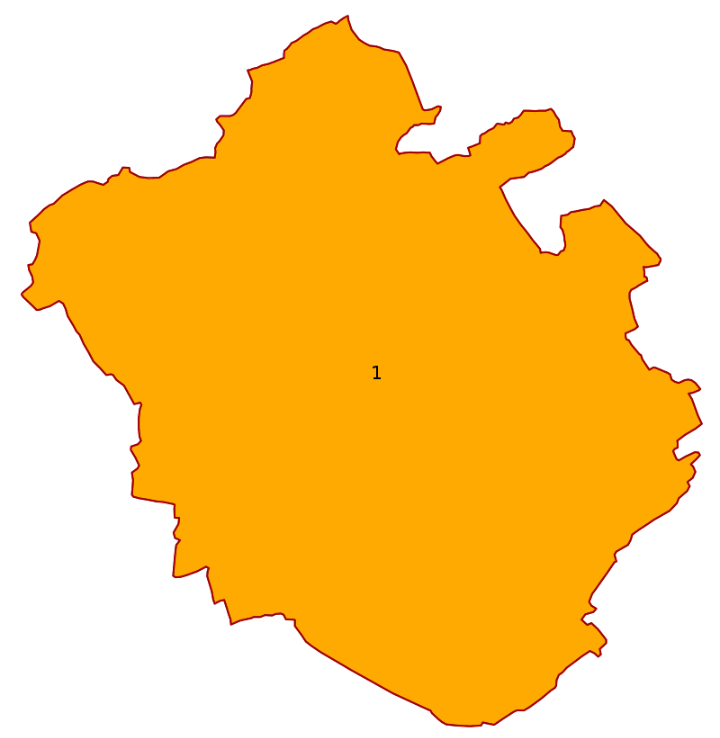

BJP (1)

#	Constituency	Candidate	Party	Poll On	Result
1	Chandigarh	Kirron Kher	BJP	10 April 2014	Won

== Dadra and Nagar Haveli (1) ==
BJP (1)

#	Constituency	Candidate	Party	Poll On	Result
1	Dadra and Nagar Haveli (ST)	Natubhai Gomanbhai Patel	BJP	30 April 2014	Won

== Daman and Diu (1) ==
BJP (1)

#	Constituency	Candidate	Party	Poll On	Result
1	Daman and Diu	Lalubhai B. Patel	BJP	30 April 2014	Won

== Lakshadweep (1) ==
BJP (1)

#	Constituency	Candidate	Party	Poll On	Result
1	Lakshadweep	M. P. Sayed Mohammaed Koya	BJP	10 April 2014	Lost

== NCT of Delhi (7) ==
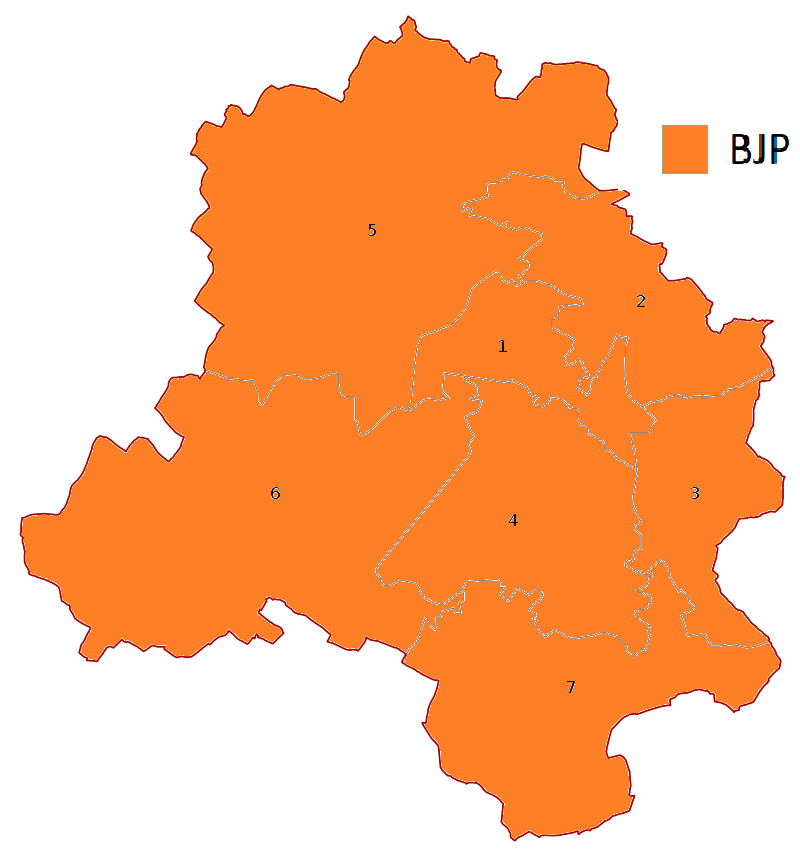

BJP (7)

#	Constituency	Candidate	Party	Poll On	Result
1	Chandni Chowk	Harsh Vardhan	BJP	10 April 2014	Won
2	North East Delhi	Manoj Tiwari	BJP	10 April 2014	Won
3	East Delhi	Maheish Girri	BJP	10 April 2014	Won
4	New Delhi	Meenakshi Lekhi	BJP	10 April 2014	Won
5	North West Delhi (SC)	Udit Raj	BJP	10 April 2014	Won
6	West Delhi	Pravesh Verma	BJP	10 April 2014	Won
7	South Delhi	Ramesh Bidhuri	BJP	10 April 2014	Won

== Puducherry (1) ==
AINRC (1)

#	Constituency	Candidate	Party	Poll On	Result
1	Puducherry	R. Radhakrishnan	AINRC	24 April 2014	Won

== See also ==
List of National Democratic Alliance candidates in the 1998 Indian general election
List of National Democratic Alliance candidates in the 1999 Indian general election
List of National Democratic Alliance candidates in the 2004 Indian general election
List of National Democratic Alliance candidates in the 2009 Indian general election
List of National Democratic Alliance candidates in the 2014 Indian general election
List of National Democratic Alliance candidates in the 2019 Indian general election
List of National Democratic Alliance candidates in the 2024 Indian general election

- List of United Progressive Alliance candidates in the 2014 Indian general election
- List of United Democratic Front candidates in the 2014 Indian general election
- List of Left Democratic Front candidates in the 2014 Indian general election
- List of West Bengal Left Front candidates in the 2014 Indian general election
- Bharatiya Janata Party campaign for the 2014 Indian general election
