= Chandubhai Shihora =

Indian politician

Chandubhai Chhaganbhaiji Shihora
- ચંદુભાઈ છગનભાઈ શિહોરા
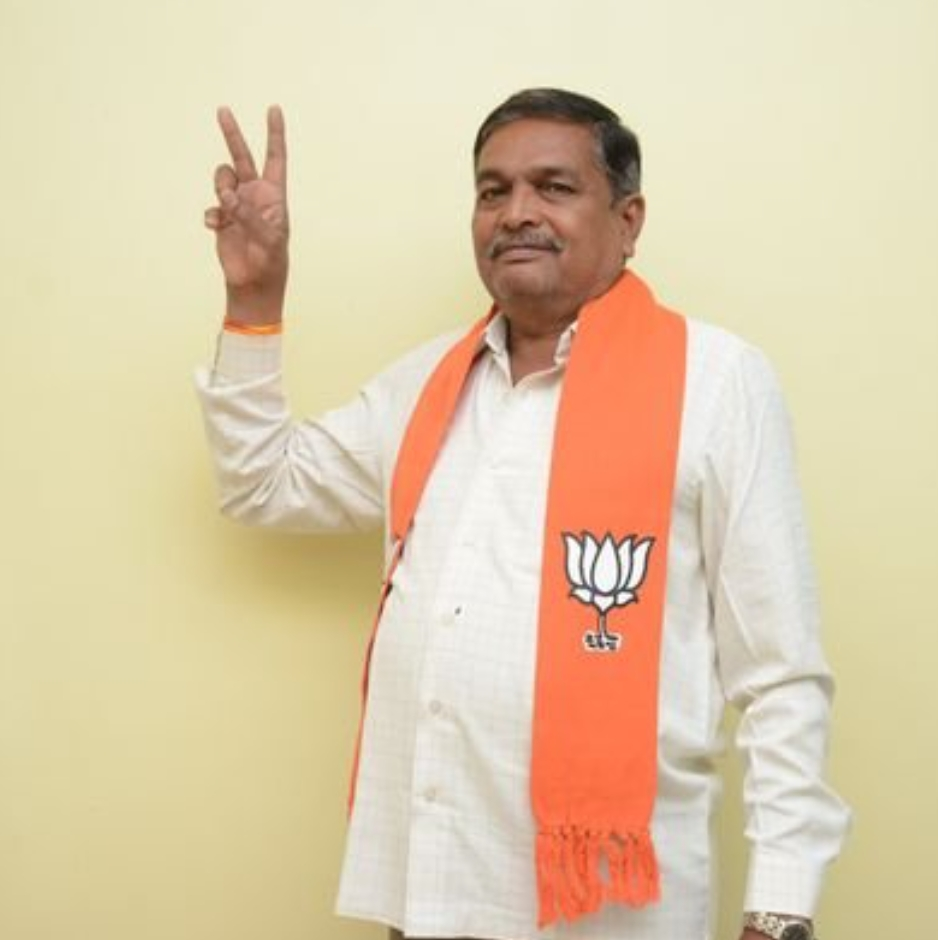
- Chandubhai Chhaganbhaiji Shihora, Member of Parliament from Surendranagar Lok Sabha constituency in Gujarat state of India

Member of Parliament, Lok Sabha
- Incumbent
- Assumed office 2024
- President: Draupadi Murmu
- Prime Minister: Narendra Modi
- Vice President: Jagdeep Dhankhar
- Preceded by: Dr. Mahendrabhaiji Munjapara

Personal details
- Born: Chandubhai Shihora; 1962 (age 63–64) Surendranagar, Surendranagar district, Gujarat, India, Asia
- Citizenship: India
- Party: Bharatiya Janata Party
- Occupation: Politician
- Profession: Agriculturist
- Nickname: Shihora Bhaiji

Chandubhai Chhaganbhai Shihora is an Indian politician, social worker and the elected candidate for Lok Sabha from Surendranagar Lok Sabha constituency as a member of Bharatiya Janata Party. In 2024 Indian general elections, he defeated the Rutvikbhai Makwana of Indian National Congress party by the margin of 2,61,617 votes.

== Early life ==
Chandubhai Shihora was born in a agriculturist Koli family to Chhaganbhaiji Shihora of Surendranagar city of Gujarat in the year 1962.

== Political career ==
- President of Morbi district panchayat
- 2024 - ongoing: Member of Parliament, Lok Sabha from Surendranagar Lok Sabha constituency

== See also ==
- 18th Lok Sabha
