= Somabhai Gandalal Koli Patel =

Indian politician

Somabhai Gandabhai Koli Patel

Personal details
- Born: 10 August 1940 (age 86) Nagadka, Sayla Taluka, Surendranagar, Bombay Presidency, British India (present day Gujarat, India)
- Party: Bharatiya Janata Party
- Other political affiliations: Indian National Congress
- Spouse: Madhukantaben Patel
- Children: 4
- Parents: Gandalal Patel; Ambaben Patel
- Education: Viramgam Taluka Shala, Ahmedabad
- Occupation: Politician; Agriculturist

Somabhai Gandalal Koli Patel (born 10 August 1940) is an Indian politician and a member of the 15th Lok Sabha of India. He represents the Surendranagar constituency of Gujarat and is a member of the Bharatiya Janata Party. Patel was arrested during the Emergency in 1977–78.

Somabhai Patel got the MLA ticket for the first time from the Bharatiya Janata Party in 1985. Patel had turned the Koli caste, which was considered the backbone of the Congress, towards the Bharatiya Janata Party, as well as other Other Backward Class castes towards the Bharatiya Janata Party.

== Positions held ==
List of some positions

- 1980–89 President, BJP, Taluka Viramgam, Gujarat
- 1984–89 Vice Chairman, Municipality, Viramgam, Gujarat Member, Gujarat
- 1989 Elected to 9th Lok Sabha
- 1990 Member, Advisory Committee of the Ministry of Surface Transport
- 1991 Re-elected to 10th Lok Sabha (2nd term)
- Elected to 14th Lok Sabha in 2004 (3rd term), Member of Committee on Foreign Affairs, Members of Committee on Absence of Members from the House Meeting
- Member, Committee on Absence of Members from the House Meeting since 7 August 2006

=== Other ===
- 1997–99 President of State Transport, Gujarat
- 1985–90 Member, Joint Secretary of International Koli Samaj and Lions Club, Viramgam, Gujarat as well as Vice President of Gujarat State Koli Samaj
