= Devjibhai Govindbhai Fatepara =

Indian politician

Devjibhai Fatepara

Member of the India Parliament for Surendranagar
- In office 1 September 2014 – 23 May 2019
- Succeeded by: Mahendra Munjapara
- Constituency: Surendranagar

Personal details
- Born: 20 November 1959 (age 66) Kandkot, Rajkot, Gujarat
- Party: Bharatiya Janata Party
- Spouse: Smt. Manisha Devjibhai Fatepara
- Children: 5
- Occupation: Social Worker
- As of 13 December, 2016

Devjibhai Govindbhai Fatepara (born 20 November 1959, Kankot) is a member of the 16th Lok Sabha of India. He represented the Surendranagar constituency of Gujarat and is a member of the Bharatiya Janata Party political party.

He was the Member for the Halvad constituency of the Gurarat Legislative Assembly from 2007 to 2012.
