= Savshibhai Makwana =

Indian politician and writer

Savshibhai Kanjibhai Makwana

Member of parliament
- In office 1999-2004
- Constituency: Surendranagar

Member of the Gujarat Legislative Assembly
- In office 1998-1999

Personal details
- Born: 12 June 1932; Dhajala, Wadhwan State, British India
- Political party: Indian National Congress
- Spouse: Smt. Gangaben Makwana
- Children: 4
- Education: Matriculate
- Alma mater: Rashtriyashala, Wadhwan City, Village Dakshinamurthy, Ambla, Distt. Bhavnagar (Gujarat)
- Occupation: Agriculturist, politician, local leader

Savshibhai Kanjibhai Makwana was a member of the 13th Lok Sabha of India from Surendranagar constituency Gujarat. Makwana is a member of the Indian National Congress Party and won by 25,990 votes. Savshibhai belong to the Koli caste of Gujarat.

Savshibhai Makwana wrote a book in Gujarati language named Zadna Parakha Far Par Thi.

== Political career ==
- 1960-70 : Sarpanch of Dhalaja
- 1980-80 : Panchayat Pramukh of Sayla Taluka
- 1998-1999 : Member of Gujarat Legislative Assembly
- 1999-2004 : Member of Parliament, Lok Sabha
- 1999-2000 : Member of Committee on agriculture
