= Bhavna Kardam Dave =

Indian politician

MP
- Constituency: Surendranagar

Personal details
- Born: 7 July 1952
- Party: Bharatiya Janata Party
- Spouse: Kardam B. Dave
- Profession: Politician Educationist

Bhavna Kardam Dave (born. 7 July 1952) is a politician and a member of parliament elected from the Surendranagar constituency in the Indian state of Gujarat. She was elected as a member in the 12th Lok Sabha elections from Bharatiya Janta Party.

== Personal life ==
She was born on 7 July 1952 in the Nagpur city of Maharashtra, India. She married Kardam B. Dave on 25 Jun 1977 and has two daughters; Ishani and Khyati. She presently resides in Ahmedabad, Gujarat.

== Education and career ==
Bhavna has a Master of Arts in Economics and holds a Bachelor of Education. She studied at Gujarat University and SNDT Women's University in Mumbai, Maharashtra. She was elected as the Mayor of the Municipal Corporation, Ahmedabad, Gujarat from 1995 to 1996. She was elected to 12th Lok Sabha in 1998. She lost her Lok Sabha constituency, Surendranagar, against Savji Makwana of the Indian National Congress in 1999.
