= Mahendra Munjapara =

Indian politician (born 1968)

Mahendra Munjpara
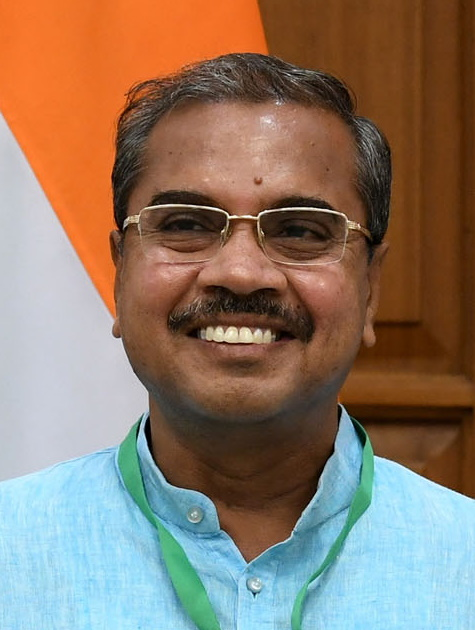
- Munjapara in 2021

Union Minister of State for Women and Child Development
- In office 7 July 2021 – 9 June 2024
- Minister: Smriti Irani
- Preceded by: Debasree Chaudhuri

Union Minister of State for AYUSH
- In office 7 July 2021 – 9 June 2024
- Minister: Sarbananda Sonowal
- Preceded by: Office established
- Succeeded by: Vacant

Member of Parliament, Lok Sabha
- In office 23 May 2019 – 4 June 2024
- Constituency: Surendranagar, Gujarat

Personal details
- Born: 21 September 1968 (age 58) Surendranagar Dudhrej, Gujarat, India
- Party: Bharatiya Janata Party
- Spouse: Bhavnaben Munjpara (m. 1996)
- Children: 2 (1 daughter and 1 son)
- Education: NHL medical college, Ahmedabad
- Occupation: Doctor; politician

Dr. Mahendrabhai Kalubhai Munjpara (born 21 September 1968) is an Indian politician who served as the Minister of State for AYUSH and Minister of State for Woman and Child Development in the Second Modi ministry from 7 July 2021 until 9 June 2024. He is member of parliament to the 17th Lok Sabha from Surendranagar constituency, Gujarat. He won the 2019 general election as a Bharatiya Janata Party candidate. Before his political career, he has been a practicing doctor in Surendranagar as a Cardiologist and Echocardiologist. Munjapara belong to Koli community of Gujarat.
