= Bhupendrasinh Prabhatsinh Solanki =

Indian politician

MP
- Constituency: Godhra

Personal details
- Born: 26 March 1954 (age 72) Panchmahal, Bombay State, India
- Party: Bharatiya Janata Party
- Spouse: Smt. Manoharkunvarba Solanki
- Children: 1 son and 1 daughter
- As of 25 February, 2006

Bhupendrasinh Prabhatsinh Solanki (born 26 March 1954) was a member of the 14th Lok Sabha of India. He represented the Godhra constituency of Gujarat and is a member of the Bharatiya Janata Party.
