= Surendranagar Lok Sabha constituency =

Lok Sabha constituency in Gujarat

Coordinates: 22.7°N 71.6°E

Surendranagar
- Lok Sabha constituency
- Surendranagar Lok Sabha Constituency સુરેન્દ્નગર લોક સભા મતદાર વિભાગ

Constituency details
- Country: India
- Region: Western India
- State: Gujarat
- Assembly constituencies: Viramgam; Dhandhuka; Dasada; Limbdi; Wadhwan; Chotila; Dhrangadhra
- Established: 1962
- Reservation: None

Member of Parliament
- 18th Lok Sabha
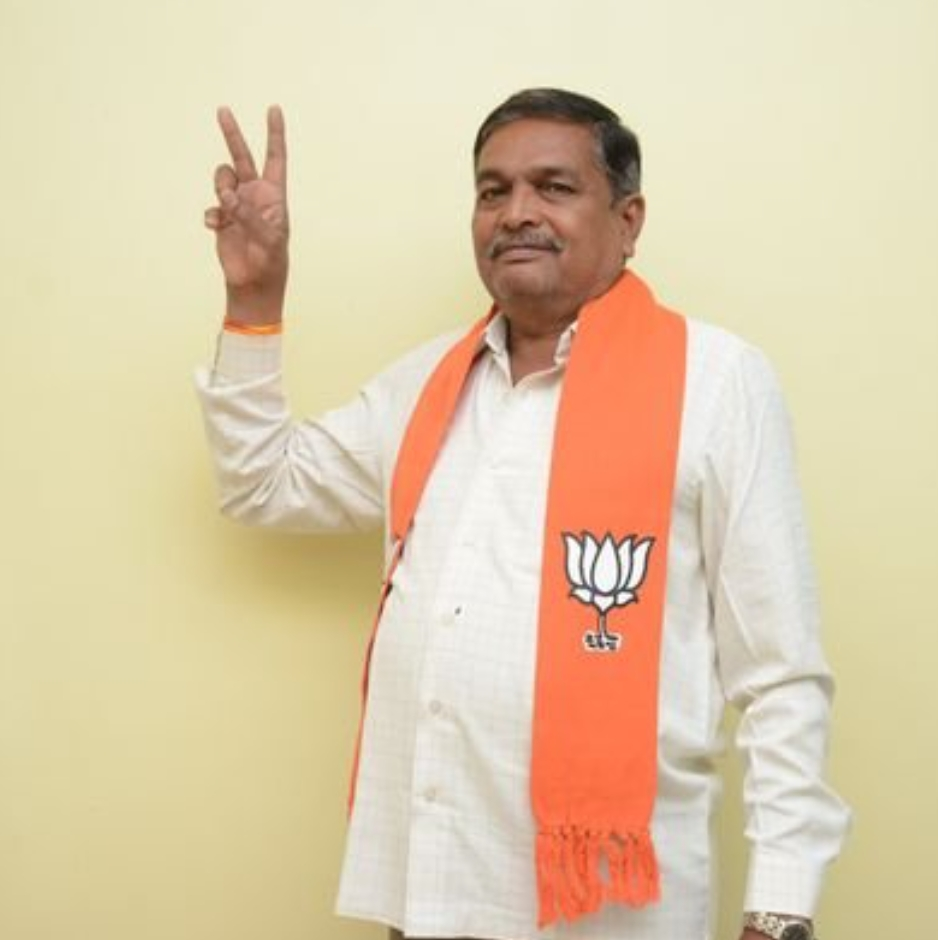
- Incumbent Chandubhai Chhaganbhaiji Shihora
- Party: Bharatiya Janata Party
- Elected year: 2024

Surendranagar Lok Sabha constituency (Gujarati: સુરેન્દ્રનગર લોકસભા મતવિસ્તાર) is one of the 26 Lok Sabha (parliamentary) constituencies in Gujarat state in western India.

== Assembly segments ==
Presently, Surendranagar Lok Sabha constituency comprises seven Vidhan Sabha (legislative assembly) segments. These are:

Constituency number	Name	Reserved for (SC/ST/None)	District	Party	2024 Lead
39	Viramgam	None	Ahmedabad	BJP	BJP
59	Dhandhuka	None	Ahmedabad	BJP	BJP
60	Dasada	SC	Surendranagar	BJP	BJP
61	Limbdi	None	Surendranagar	BJP	BJP
62	Wadhwan	None	Surendranagar	BJP	BJP
63	Chotila	None	Surendranagar	BJP	BJP
64	Dhrangadhra	None	Surendranagar	BJP	BJP

== Members of Parliament ==
Year	Winner	Party
1962	Ghanshyambhai Chhotalal Oza	Indian National Congress
1967	Meghrajji III	Swatantra Party
1971	Rasiklal Parikh	Indian National Congress
1977	Ramdas Kishordas Amin	Janata Party
1980	Digvijaysinh Jhala	Indian National Congress
1984	Digvijaysinh Jhala	Indian National Congress
1989	Somabhai Gandalal Koli Patel	Bharatiya Janata Party
1991	Somabhai Gandalal Koli Patel	Bharatiya Janata Party
1996	Sanat Mehta	Indian National Congress
1998	Bhavna Dave	Bharatiya Janata Party
1999	Savshibhai Makwana	Indian National Congress
2004	Somabhai Gandalal Koli Patel	Bharatiya Janata Party
2009	Somabhai Gandalal Koli Patel	Indian National Congress
2014	Devjibhai Govindbhai Fatepara	Bharatiya Janata Party
2019	Mahendra Munjapara	Bharatiya Janata Party
2024	Chandubhai Shihora	Bharatiya Janata Party

== Election results ==
=== General election 2024 ===
2024 Indian general elections: Surendranagar
Party	Candidate	Votes	%	±%
BJP	Chandubhai Chhaganbhai Shihora	669,749	59.20	+0.57
INC	Rutvikbhai Lavjibhai Makwana	4,08,132	36.07	+3.19
BSP	Dabhi Ashokbhai Sukhabhai	12,036	1.06	−0.13
NOTA	None of the Above	13,299	1.18	+0.36
Majority		2,61,617	23.08	
Turnout		11,33,390	55.69	
BJP hold		Swing		

=== General election 2019 ===
2019 Indian general elections: Surendranagar
Party	Candidate	Votes	%	±%
BJP	Dr. Mahendra Munjapara	631,844	58.63	+2.63
INC	Somabhai Gandalal Koli Patel	3,54,407	32.88	−1.64
BSP	Shailesh N. Solanki	12,860	1.19	+0.05
Independent	Dost Mer	11,103	1.03	New
NOTA	None of the Above	8,787	0.82	−0.35
Majority		2,77,437	25.75	+4.27
Turnout		10,80,199	58.41	+1.34
BJP hold		Swing		

=== General election 2014 ===
2014 Indian general elections: Surendranagar
Party	Candidate	Votes	%	±%
BJP	Devajibhai Fatepara	5,29,003	56.00	+13.75
INC	Somabhai Gandalal Koli Patel	3,26,096	34.52	−6.90
Independent	Vipulbhai Sapara	14,524	1.54	N/A
AAP	Jethabhai Manjibhai Patel	13,375	1.42	
NOTA	None of the Above	11,024	1.17	N/A
Majority		2,02,907	21.48	+20.65
Turnout		9,45,439	57.07	+9.05
BJP gain from INC		Swing	+10.3	

=== General elections 2009 ===
2009 Indian general elections: Surendranagar
Party	Candidate	Votes	%	±%
INC	Somabhai Gandalal Koli Patel	2,47,705	42.25	
BJP	Laljibhai Mer	2,42,868	41.42	
BSP	Mohanbhai Patel	31,971	5.45	
Majority		4,831	0.83	
Turnout		5,86,317	39.73	
INC gain from BJP		Swing		

=== General elections 2004 ===
2004 Indian general elections: Surendranagar
Party	Candidate	Votes	%	±%
BJP	Somabhai Gandalal Koli Patel	2,19,872	48.15	
INC	Savshibhai Makwana	1,85,928	40.71	
BSP	Ratilal Jinjariya	15,499	3.39	
Majority		33,944	7.45	
Turnout		4,55,632	41.06	
BJP gain from INC		Swing		

== See also ==
- Surendranagar district
- List of constituencies of the Lok Sabha
