= Kondh, Surendranagar =

Kondh
- Village
- Location in Gujarat, India Kondh (India)
- Coordinates: 22°53′16″N 71°18′26″E
- Country: India
- State: Gujarat
- District: Surendranagar District
- Elevation: 54 m (177 ft)

Population
  - Total: 8,026

Languages
  - Official: Gujarati (State), gujrati Hindi (Federal)
- Time zone: UTC+5:30 (IST)
- PIN: 363310
- Telephone code: 02754
- Vehicle registration: GJ
- Nearest cities: Dhrangadhra, Halvad, Surendranagar
- Climate: Dry almost (Köppen)
- Website: gujaratindia.com

Kondh is a village in Dhrangadhra Taluka in Surendranagar district of Gujarat State, India. Nearby villages are Rajcharadi, Hampar, Navalgadh, Bhechada, Gajanvav, Ratanpar, Rampara, Raygadh, Ravaliyavadar and Narichana.

Kondh's main crops are magafali (peanuts) and kappas (cotton).

Kondh's Postal Index Number code is 363310 and the postal head office is Surendranagar.
