= Bhechada =

- Village
- Location in Gujarat, India Bhechada (India)
- Coordinates: 22°54′22″N 71°26′57″E
- Country: India
- State: Gujarat
- District: Surendranagar District
- Elevation: 54 m (177 ft)

Population
  - Total: 1,482

Languages
  - Official: Gujarati (State), Hindi (Federal)
- Time zone: UTC+5:30 (IST)
- PIN: 363310
- Telephone code: 02754
- Vehicle registration: GJ
- Nearest cities: Thangadh, Wadhwan, Wankaner and Limbdi
- Climate: Dry almost (Köppen)
- Website: gujaratindia.com

Bhechada is a village in the Surendranagar district of the state of Gujarat in India. It is surrounded by the Thangadh, Wankaner, Limbdi and Wadhwan Tehsil.
