= Nayka Dam =

- Nayka Dam
- Interactive map of Nayka Dam
- Official name: Bhogavo-I Water Resources Project
- Country: India
- Location: Gautamgadh, Sayla, Surendranagar District
- Coordinates: 22.6732°N 71.4771°E
- Purpose: Irrigation
- Status: Operational
- Opening date: 1961
- Construction cost: Rs 75.03 Lakhs

Dam and spillways
- Type of dam: Earthen
- Impounds: Bhogavo River
- Height (foundation): 15 metres (49 ft)
- Length: 2,012 metres (6,600 ft)
- Spillways: Vertical 20, Automatic 14
- Spillway type: Ogee
- Spillway capacity: 2097 m3/s

Reservoir
- Creates: Nayka Bhogavo I Reservoir
- Total capacity: 18 MCM
- Active capacity: 13 MCM
- Catchment area: 435 square kilometres (4.7×10^{9} sq ft)
- Website; Nayka dam
- Gujarat and Indian WRIS specifications differ

Nayka Dam is an earthen dam on the Bhogavo River located near Surendranagar in the Indian state of Gujarat. Nayka is a major source of water and helps with flood control.

The dam serves seven villages. One village is fully and another village partially submerged behind the dam. The reservoir covers 122 hectares (300 acres; 0.47 sq mi) forest land, 140 hectares (350 acres; 0.54 sq mi) wasteland, 324 hectares (800 acres; 1.25 sq mi) cultivable land.

The Nayka Dam irrigated 1,935 hectares (4,780 acres; 7.47 sq mi) in 1997–98.
