= Hampar =

- Village
- Location in Gujarat, India Hampar (India)
- Coordinates: 22°54′20″N 71°34′16″E
- Country: India
- State: Gujarat
- District: Surendranagar District
- Elevation: 54 m (177 ft)

Population
  - Total: 1,179

Languages
  - Official: Gujarati (State), Hindi (Federal)
- Time zone: UTC+5:30 (IST)
- PIN: 363320
- Telephone code: 02754
- Vehicle registration: GJ
- Nearest cities: Wadhwan, Limbdi, Viramgam and Thangadh
- Climate: Dry almost (Köppen)

Hampar is a village in the Surendranagar District of the state of Gujarat in India.

Hampar is surrounded by the Lakhtar, Surendranagar, Wadhwan and Muli talukas.

== History ==
As Hampar village is located near Dhrangdhra, it must be ruled by Jhala dynasty of Dhrangdhra.

During British period, Hampar State was a princely state. It was ruled by Shivsinhji Jhala.

Hampar Vav is a stepwell in village which is dated to 16th to 17th century.
