= Dholidhaja Dam =

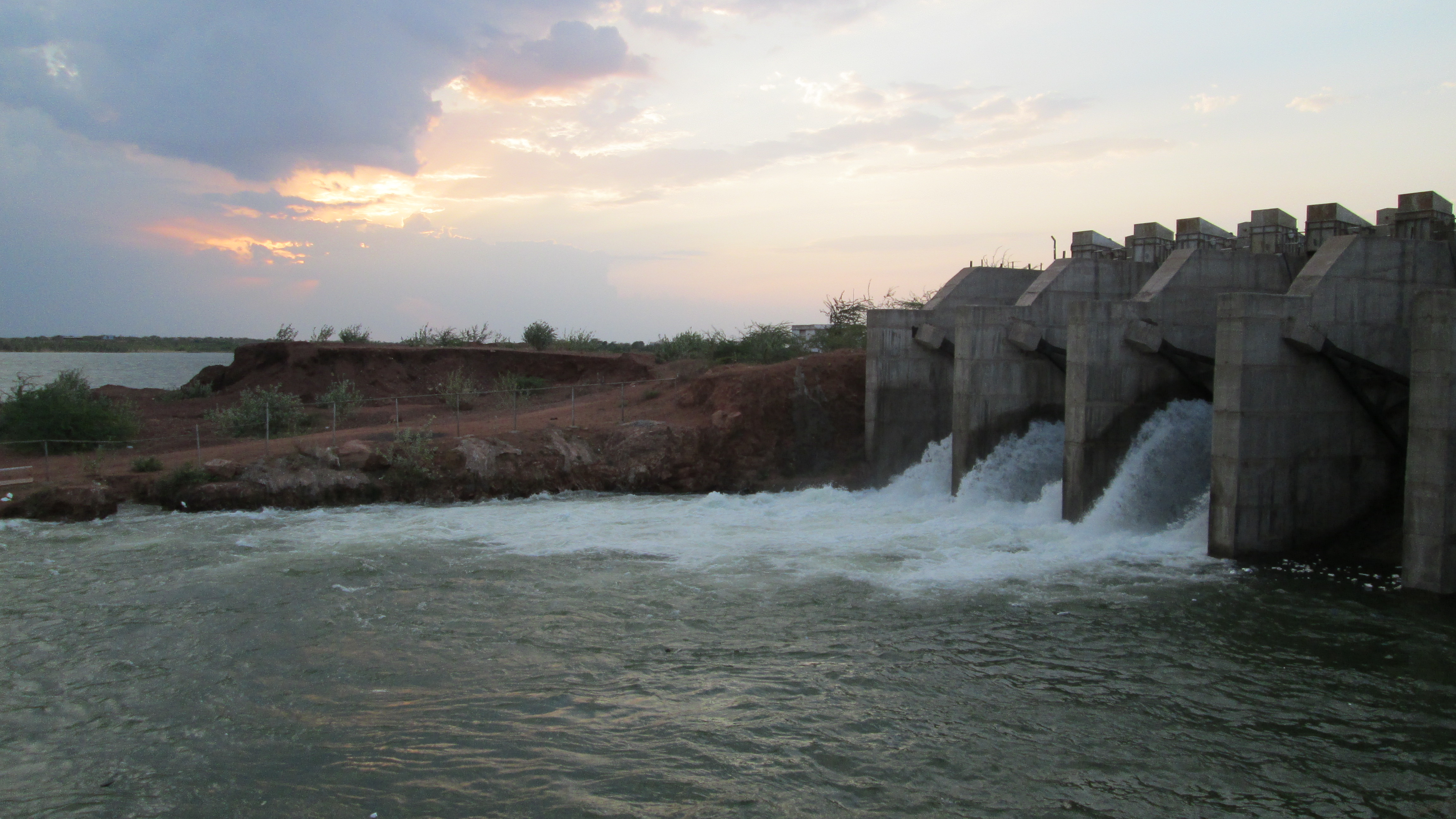
- Dholi Dhaja Dam Gate

- Location within Gujarat
- Interactive map of Dholidhaja Dam
- Official name: Bhogavo-II (Wadhowan) Dam
- Country: India
- Location: Surendranagar, Gujarat
- Coordinates: 22°42′50″N 71°34′20″E
- Opening date: 1959

Dam and spillways
- Type of dam: Earthen
- Impounds: Bhogavo River
- Length: 3891 m

Dholi Dhaja Dam, across the Bhogavo River, is located near Surendranagar city and in the urban area of Surendranagar Dudhrej Municipality in the state of Gujarat, India.

== Purpose ==
It provides drinking and utility water to 300,000 to 400,000 people of Surendranagar, Wadhwan, Joravarnagar, and Ratanpar.

== Tourism ==
On 26 January 2010, Narendra Modi, then Chief Minister of Gujarat, announced that Dholidhaja Dam would be developed as a tourist destination.

60,000 trees have been planted near the dam.

It has developed into a very good picnic spot.

== Transport ==
It is located in the west of Surendranagar. Dholidhaja Dam can be reached via Muli Highway or via Dalmill-Khamisana Road.
