= Navalgadh =

- Village
- Location in Gujarat, India Navalgadh (India)
- Coordinates: 22°55′3″N 71°30′19″E
- Country: India
- State: Gujarat
- District: Surendranagar District
- Elevation: 54 m (177 ft)

Population
  - Total: 1,857

Languages
  - Official: Gujarati (State), Hindi (Federal)
- Time zone: UTC+5:30 (IST)
- PIN: 363320
- Telephone code: 02754
- Vehicle registration: GJ
- Nearest cities: Wadhwan, Limbdi, Viramgam and Thangadh
- Climate: Dry almost (Köppen)
- Website: gujaratindia.com

Navalgadh is a village in the Surendranagar District of the State of Gujarat in India. Navalgadh is surrounded by the Lakhtar, Surendranagar, Wadhwan and Muli talukas.
