= Hampar Vav =

- Interactive map of the Hampar Vav area

General information
- Architectural style: Indian architecture
- Location: Hampar, Dhrangadhra Taluka, Surendranagar district, Gujarat, India
- Coordinates: 22.9072°N 71.57°E
- Completed: 16th to 17th century

Design and construction
- Architect: Local
- Designations: ASI State Protected Monument No. S-GJ-220

Hampar Vav is a stepwell in Hampar village of Dhrangadhra Taluka of Surendranagar district, Gujarat, India. It is a state protected monument.

== History ==
As Hampar village is located near Dhrangdhra, it must be ruled by Jhala dynasty of Dhrangdhra. As there is no inscription or sculptures in the stepwell, the date is assumed by the architecture, construction methods and decorative elements. Based on entrance pavilion-tower and decorative element of purnaghata, the stepwell is dated to 16th to 17th century. It also correspond to similarly designed Naga Bava Vav of Dhrangadhra which is dated around 1525.

It is a state protected monument (S-GJ-220).

== Architecture ==
The stepwell is constructed in north–south direction with entrance in the south and the well in the north. The stepped corridor starts from a raised platform which has steps on three sides and the fourth side leading to the well. The raised platform is covered with a half-spherical dome; forming an entrance mandapa; supported by twelve pillars, eight of which form an internal octagonal plan.

The stepped corridor is long and narrow. It has five pavilion-towers with intermediate frames which supports them. The corridor wall is damaged near the fourth pavilion-tower and the third intermediate frame. The well is filled to the level of the first floor during monsoon season. At the east end of the fifth pavilion-tower, a spiral staircase is located which leads to lower floors. The pilasters in the entrance mandapa are of the plain bhadraka type, square with recesses. The pillars in the entrance mandapa are of the mixed type, characterized by their elongated and tapering form, manifold horizontal divisions, and numerous recesses. The pillar grows narrower. The capital of the pillars is in a volute formation formed from circular bharani. The niches in the first pavilion-tower are embellished with purnaghata elements, depicting a vase, lotus flower, and chain. The mandapa features a narrow band of a geometrical flower design arranged in squares on top of the connecting lintels of the pillars, similar to Dada Harir Vav.

The stepwell supplies fresh water and is connected to a water-pulling, channeling, and storage system. Water is channeled into a large oblong trough at the western side. The gargoyle is designed in shape of a mythical elephant.
