= Rajcharadi =

- Village
- Location in Gujarat, India Rajcharadi (India)
- Coordinates: 22°55′44″N 71°37′32″E
- Country: India
- State: Gujarat
- District: Surendranagar District
- Elevation: 54 m (177 ft)

Population
  - Total: 2,469

Languages
  - Official: Gujarati (State), Hindi (Federal)
- Time zone: UTC+5:30 (IST)
- PIN: 363320
- Telephone code: 02754
- Vehicle registration: GJ
- Nearest cities: Wadhwan, Limbdi, Viramgam and Thangadh
- Climate: Dry almost (Köppen)
- Website: gujaratindia.com

Rajcharadi is a village in the Surendranagar district of Gujarat, India. Rajcharadi is surrounded by Lakhtar taluka towards the east, Surendranagar taluka towards the west, Wadhwan taluka to the north and Muli taluka at the south. Rajcharadi's Postal Index Number code is 363320 and the postal head office is Surendranagar.
