= Trinetreshwar Temple =

Trineteshwar temple
- गुर्जरा-प्रतिहार शैली का त्रिनेतेश्वर मंदिर
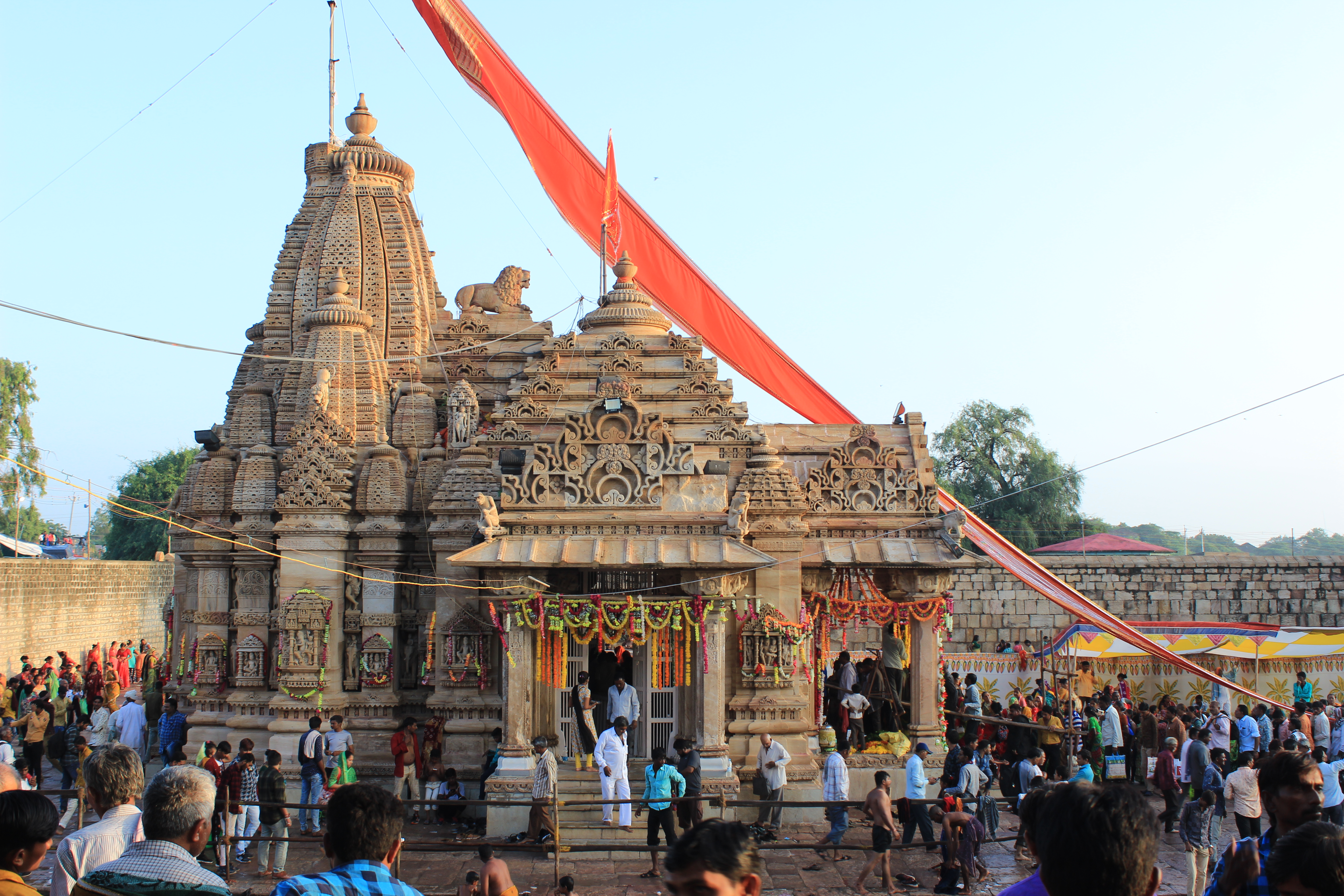

- Location in Gujarat Location in India

Religion
- Affiliation: Hinduism
- District: Surendranagar district
- Deity: Shiva as Trineteshwar
- Festival: Trineteshwar Mahadev Mela

Location
- State: Gujarat
- Country: India
- Coordinates: 22°38′45″N 71°12′48″E

Architecture
- Type: Maru Gurjara Style
- Creator: Mihira Bhoja

Trineteshwar temple (Devanagari: त्रिनेतेश्वर महादेव मंदिर) is a Shiva temple of Pratihara style, located in the Tarnetar village of Surendranagar district, Gujarat. It was built by Mihira Bhoja in the eighth century. The temple is known for its annual fair, Trinetreshwar Mahadev Mela.
