= Jagdish Makwana =

Indian politician

Jagdish Makwana (born 1972) is an Indian politician from Gujarat. He is a member of the Gujarat Legislative Assembly from Wadhwan Assembly constituency in Surendranagar district. He won the 2022 Gujarat Legislative Assembly election representing the Bharatiya Janata Party.

== Early life and education ==
Makwana is from Wadhwan, Surendranagar district, Gujarat. He is the son of Prabhubhai Maganbhai. He completed his B.Com. in 1995 at ARS Sakhida Arts and Commerce College, Limbdi.

== Career ==
Makwana won from Wadhwan Assembly constituency representing the Bharatiya Janata Party in the 2022 Gujarat Legislative Assembly election. He polled 105,903 votes and defeated his nearest rival, Hitesh Patel Bajrang of the Aam Aadmi Party, by a margin of 65,489 votes.
