= Wadhwan Assembly constituency =

Legislative Assembly constituency in Gujarat State, India

Coordinates: 22.71°N 71.67°E

Wadhwan
- Constituency No. 62 for the Gujarat Legislative Assembly

Constituency details
- Country: India
- Region: Western India
- State: Gujarat
- District: Surendranagar
- Lok Sabha constituency: Surendranagar
- Established: 1972
- Total electors: 300,511
- Reservation: None

Member of Legislative Assembly
- 15th Gujarat Legislative Assembly
- Incumbent Jagdishbhai Prabhubhai Makwana
- Party: Bharatiya Janata Party
- Elected year: 2022

Wadhwan is one of the 182 Legislative Assembly constituencies of Gujarat state in India. It is part of Surendranagar district.

== List of segments ==
This assembly seat represents the following segments

1. Wadhwan Taluka

== Members of Legislative Assembly ==
Year	Member	Picture	Party
2002	Dhanrajbhai Kela		Bharatiya Janata Party
2007	Varsa Doshi		Bharatiya Janata Party
2012	Varsa Doshi		Bharatiya Janata Party
2017	Dhanji Patel		Bharatiya Janata Party
2022	Jagdish Prabhubhai Makwana		Bharatiya Janata Party

== Election results ==
=== 2022 ===
2022 Gujarat Legislative Assembly election: Wadhwan
Party	Candidate	Votes	%	±%
BJP	Jagdish Makwana	105,903	60.11	+8.16
AAP	Bajrang Patel	40,414	22.94	New
INC	Tarun Gadhvi	22,385	12.71	−27.92
Majority			37.17	
Turnout		1,76,168		
BJP hold		Swing		

=== 2017 ===
2017 Gujarat Legislative Assembly election: Wadhwan
Party	Candidate	Votes	%	±%
BJP	Dhanjibhai Patel (Makson)	89,595	51.95	
INC	Mohanbhai Dahyabhai Patel	70,071	40.63	
IND	Charulata Vasani	2,682	1.56	
Majority		19,524	11.32	
Turnout		1,72,450	64.07	
BJP hold		Swing		

=== 2012 ===
Gujarat Assembly Election, 2012
Party	Candidate	Votes	%	±%
BJP	Varshaben Doshi	83,049	51.39	+10.75
INC	Himanshu Vyas	65,491	40.52	+5.79
Majority		17,558	10.87	+4.96
Turnout		1,61,631	69.96	
BJP hold		Swing		

=== 2007 ===
Gujarat Assembly Election, 2007
Party	Candidate	Votes	%	±%
BJP	Varshaben Doshi	47,466	40.64	−10.7
INC	Himanshu Vyas	40,564	34.73	−1.28
Independent	Dhanrajbhai Kela	23,261	19.92	New
Majority		6,902	5.91	−9.42
Turnout		1,16,786		
BJP hold		Swing		

=== 2002 ===
Gujarat Assembly Election, 2002
Party	Candidate	Votes	%	±%
BJP	Dhanrajbhai Kela	59,446	51.34	
INC	Ranjitsinh Jilubha Zala	41,702	36.01	
Independent	Gangarambhai Sankaliya	7,302	6.31	
Majority		17,742	15.33	
Turnout		1,15,794	60.93	
BJP hold		Swing		

== See also ==
- List of constituencies of the Gujarat Legislative Assembly
- Surendranagar district
