= Ranagadh, Gujarat =

Indian village

Coordinates: 22.786°N 71.987°E

Ranagadh is a small village in the Limbdi tehsil of Surendranagar district in the state of Gujarat in India. It is one of the villages in Gujarat where malnutrition claims lives of several children. The seven villages of Limbdi and Lakhtar talukas, malnutrition has taken a particularly heavy toll in Ranagadh and Nani Katechi villages of Limbdi taluka. Till September 1, as many as 44 children had died in Ranagadh and almost an equal number in Nani Katechi.

== Agricultural ==
The salinity of soil and water is highest in Ranagadh, as it comes from the sources like Nal Sarovar. The majority of landuse covers cultivation of Bajra, Cotton and Jowar as main crops. In Ranagadh vast tracts of land are not available for cultivation and left for culturable waste. In Ranagadh major source of water is the Nal Lake but well water is used for drinking and cooking.

== Human movement ==
There a petition filed by residents of Ranagadh village of Limbdi Taluka objecting to a 2003 circular prohibiting human movement in Nalsarovar bird sanctuary during night time. The villagers have reached the High Court stating that the authorities have invoked the 2003 circular by the forest department imposing a ban on entry and exit of local residents in the sanctuary area between 5 pm and 7 am. In reply, the court issued a notice to the state government including senior forest department officials asking a reply within 2 weeks on why the petition should not be entertained.

== Death of sheep ==
The various migrants who were shepherd stands amongst their dead sheep at a field in Ranagadh village. The cities across northern India had been facing temperatures above 47 Celsius (116.6 Fahrenheit). A local veterinarian said approximately 60 sheep have died due to extreme heat and deprivation of water.

== Folk Dance ==
The folk dance of the Padhars of Ranagadh village has got such an excellence that it was appraised with distinction at the Republic Day Folk Dance festivals in Delhi, in the recent past.
