= Juna Jashapar =

- Village
- Location in Gujarat, India Juna Jashapar (India)
- Coordinates: 22°29′N 71°27′E
- Country: India
- State: Gujarat
- District: Surendranagar

Government
  - Sarpanch: Jesabhai Algotar

Languages
  - Official: Gujarati
- Time zone: UTC+5:30 (IST)
- PIN: 363430
- Vehicle registration: GJ-13
- Nearest city: Sayla City
- Sex ratio: 1014:1000 ♀/♂
- Literacy: 58.79%

Juna Jashapar is a small village located in Sayla Taluka of Surendranagar district, Gujarat where 442 families live. At the 2011 Census the village had a population of 2662 of which 1322 were males and 1340 are females.

The village's population of children aged 0–6 is 541 which makes up 20.32% of the total population. The average sex ratio of Juna Jashapar village is 1014 which is higher than Gujarat state average of 919. The child sex ratio for the Juna Jashapar as per census is 1081, higher than Gujarat average of 890.

Juna Jashapar village has a lower literacy rate than Gujarat. In 2011, literacy rate of Juna Jashapar village was 58.79% compared to 78.03% of Gujarat. The male literacy rate was 75.61% while the female literacy rate was 41.93%.

As per constitution of India and Panchyati Raaj Act, Juna Jashapar village is administrated by Sarpanch (Head of Village) who is elected representative of the village.

== images ==
Images from Juna Jashapar

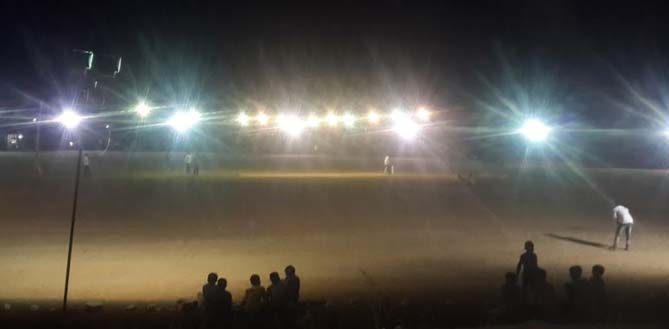
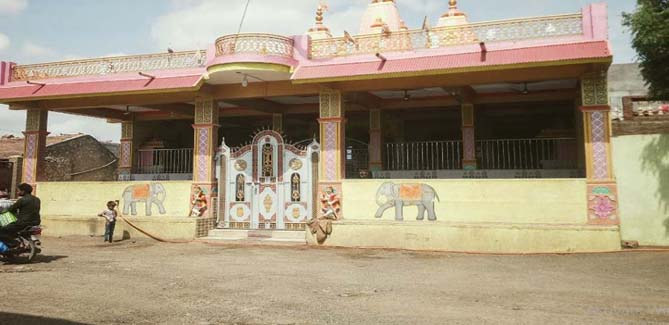

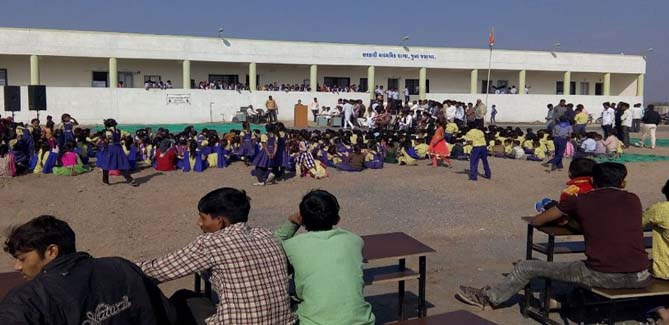
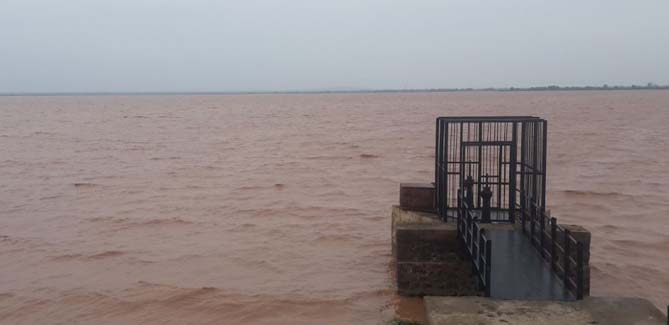

== See also ==
- Sayla
- Sudamda
