= Malaniyad =

- Village
- Location within Gujarat
- Coordinates: 23.1194°N 71.2570°E
- Country: India
- State: Gujarat
- District: Surendranagar district
- Taluka: Halvad

Government
  - Type: Gram Panchayat

Languages[Gujarati, Kathyavadi]
- Time zone: UTC+5:30 (IST)
- PIN: 363330
- Area code: 363330
- Website: https://malaniyad.wordpress.com/

Malaniyad is a village located in the Halvad Taluka of Surendranagar district of Gujarat State, India. Now this village is in the Halvad taluka of Morbi district. of Gujarat state, India. New district is included in new Gujarat map. This village is near Little Rann of Kutch. Total Population of this village is around 3446.
