= Sayla taluka =

Sayla Taluka
- Sub-District
- Location in Gujarat, India Sayla Taluka (India)
- Coordinates: 22°33′N 71°29′E
- Country: India
- State: Gujarat
- District: Surendranagar
- Headquarters: Sayla city

Government
  - Body: Surendranagar Dudhrej

Languages
  - Official: Gujarati, Hindi
- Time zone: UTC+5:30 (IST)
- PIN: 363430
- Telephone code: 91 2752
- Vehicle registration: GJ-13
- Nearest city: Wadhwan City
- Sex ratio: 932:1000 ♀/♂
- Literacy: 73.12%%
- Lok Sabha constituency: Bharatiya Janata Party
- Civic agency: Surendranagar Dudhrej
- Website: gujaratindia.com

Sayla is a sub-district of Surendranagar district, Gujarat, India.

== Villages in Sayla ==
Village code	Village name	Short name
512418	Chitralank	CL
512419	Ishvariya	IS
512420	Chorvira (Than)	CT
512421	Sitagadh	SG
512422	Kansala	KN
512423	Kanpur	KP
512424	Bhaduka	BH
512425	Kashipara	KS
512426	Sayla	SL
512427	Nava Sudamda	NS
512428	Vakhatpar	VP
512429	Doliya	DL
512430	Aya	AY
512431	Sorimbhda	SB
512432	Hadala	HD
512433	Dharadungri	DD
512434	Brahmapuri (Vanki)	BR
512435	Shapar	SR
512436	Dhedhuki	DK
512437	Samatpar	SM
512438	Kesarpar	KR
512439	Gosal	GL
512440	Madargadh	MG
512441	Juna Jashapar	JJ
512442	Nava Jashapar	NJ
512443	Thoriyali	TH
512444	Mota Kerala	MK
512445	Vadiya	VD
512446	Nathupara	NP
512447	Sudamda	SD
512448	chhadiyali	CH
512449	Sejakpar	SJ
512450	Mota Sakhpar	MS
512451	Dhankaniya	DN
512452	Mangalkui	MN
512453	Sonpari	SN
512454	Ratanpar	RP
512455	Morsal	ML
512456	Ratadki	RT
512457	Titoda	TT
512458	Dhamrasala	DS
512459	Ovangadh	OG
512460	Vanta Vachh	VV
512461	Shirvaniya	SV
512462	Gadhshirvaniya	GS
512463	Sangoi	SI
512464	Nagadka	NG
512465	Loya	LY
512466	Chorvira (D)	CD
512467	Mota Bhadla	MB
512468	Noli	NL
512469	Lakhavad	LK
512470	Khintla	KH
512471	Gundiyavada	GD
512472	Dhandhalpur	DP
512473	Sokhada	SK
512474	Adala	AD
512475	Navagam	NV
512476	Karadi	KD
512477	Dhajala	DJ
512478	Limbala	LM
512479	Nadala (Devgadh)	ND
512480	Garambhadi	GB
512481	Dhinkwali	DW
512482	Kotda	KT
512483	Pipaliya	PP
512484	Nana Haraniya	NH
512485	Ori	OR
512486	Shekhdod	SH
512487	Ninama	NN
512488	Nana Matra	NM
512489	Kaswali	KW
512490	Gangajal	GN

== See also ==
- Sayla city
- Juna Jashapar
- Chotila
