= Jakhan =

Village in Gujarat, India

Jakhan is a village and former Hindu princely state on the Saurashtra peninsula, in Gujarat, Western India.

The village is in Limbdi Taluka, in the Limbdi constituency, in Surendranagar District.

== History ==
The petty princely state, comprising only the single village in Jhalawar prant (Eastern Kathiawar), was ruled by Jhala Rajput Chieftains. In 1901 it had a population of 441, yielding 2,500 Rupees state revenue (1903–4, mostly from land), paying 288 Rupees tribute, to the British and Junagadh State.

== Sources and external links ==
- Imperial Gazetteer, on DSAL.UChicago.edu - Kathiawar
