= Limbdi Assembly constituency =

Legislative Assembly constituency in Gujarat State, India

Coordinates: 23.01°N 74.16°E

Limbdi
- Constituency No. 61 for the Gujarat Legislative Assembly

Constituency details
- Country: India
- Region: Western India
- State: Gujarat
- District: Surendranagar
- Lok Sabha constituency: Surendranagar
- Established: 1972
- Total electors: 288,069
- Reservation: None

Member of Legislative Assembly
- 15th Gujarat Legislative Assembly
- Incumbent Kiritsinh Rana
- Party: Bharatiya Janta Party
- Elected year: 2022

Limbdi is one of the 182 Legislative Assembly constituencies of Gujarat state in India. It is part of Surendranagar district .

== List of segments ==
This assembly seat represents the following segments

1. Chuda Taluka - entirely
2. Sayla Taluka – Entire taluka except village – Ori
3. Limbdi Taluka (Part) Villages – Aanandpar, Ankewaliya, Balol, Bhalgamda, Bhoika, Bhojpara, Bodiya, Borana, Borna, Choki, Choraniya, Devpara, Dholi, Dolatpar, Gedi, Ghaghretiya, Ghaghosar, Ghanshyampar, Hadala, Jakhan, Jansali, Jasapar, Kamalpur, Kanpara, Katariya, Khambhlav, the taluka seat: Limbdi (M), Liyad, Mota Timbla, Nana Timbla, Natwargadh, Pandri, Panshina, Ralol, Ramrajpar, Samla, Raska, Sauka, Tokrala, Ughal, Umedpar, Untadi, Vakhatpar, Zamdi

== Members of Legislative Assembly ==
- 2002 - Bhavanbhai Jivanbhai Bharvad, Indian National Congress
- 2007 - Kiritsinh Rana, Bharatiya Janata Party
- 2012 - Somabhai Kolipatel, Indian National Congress
- 2013 - Kiritsinh Rana, Bharatiya Janata Party
- 2017 - Somabhai Kolipatel Indian National Congress
- 2020 - Kiritsinh Rana, Bharatiya Janata Party

Year	Member	Party
2020 (by poll)	Kiritsinh Rana	Bharatiya Janta Party
2022	Kiritsinh Rana	Bharatiya Janta Party

== Election results ==
=== 2022 ===
Gujarat Assembly election, 2022:Limbdi Assembly constituency
Party	Candidate	Votes	%	±%
BJP	Kiritsinh Jitubha Rana	81,765	44.5	▼−11.34%
AAP	Mayurbhai Merabhai Sakariya	58,619	31.9	
INC	Kalpanaben Bijalbhai Dhoriya	32,929	17.92	
NOTA	None of the above	2645	1.44	
Majority		23,146	12.6	
Turnout				
Registered electors		283,576		
BJP hold		Swing		

=== 2020 By-poll ===
By-election, 2020: Limbdi
Party	Candidate	Votes	%	±%
BJP	Kiritsinh Jitubha Rana	88,928	55.85	
INC	Khachar Chetanbhai Ramkubhai	56,878	35.72	
IND	Gabu Nagibhai Mohanbhai	4,145	2.60	
Majority		32,050	20.13	
Turnout		1,59,226	58.53	
BJP gain from INC		Swing		

=== 2017 ===
Gujarat Legislative Assembly Election, 2017: Limdi
Party	Candidate	Votes	%	±%
INC	Kolipatel Somabhai Gandalal			
NOTA	None of the Above			
Majority				
Turnout				

=== 2013 ===
By-election, 2013: Limbdi
Party	Candidate	Votes	%	±%
BJP	Kiritsinh Rana	81,159	56.51	
INC	Satish Koli Patel	56,372	39.25	
Majority		24,789	17.26	
Turnout		1,43,618	62.46	
BJP gain from INC		Swing		

=== 2012 ===
2012 Gujarat Legislative Assembly election: Limbdi
Party	Candidate	Votes	%	±%
INC	Somabhai Kolipatel	72,203	45.64	
BJP	Kiritsinh Rana	70,642	44.65	
Majority		1561		
Turnout		1,33,254	65.04	
INC gain from BJP		Swing		

== See also ==
- List of constituencies of the Gujarat Legislative Assembly
- Surendranagar district
