= Chotila Assembly constituency =

Legislative Assembly constituency in Gujarat State, India

Coordinates: 22.43°N 71.2°E

Chotila
- Constituency No. 63 for the Gujarat Legislative Assembly

Constituency details
- Country: India
- Region: Western India
- State: Gujarat
- District: Surendranagar
- Lok Sabha constituency: Surendranagar
- Established: 1972
- Total electors: 261,940
- Reservation: None

Member of Legislative Assembly
- 15th Gujarat Legislative Assembly
- Incumbent Shamjibhai Bhimjibhai Chauhan
- Party: Bharatiya Janata Party
- Elected year: 2022

Chotila is one of the 182 Legislative Assembly constituencies of Gujarat state in India. It is a part of Surendranagar district.

== List of segments ==
This assembly seat represents the following segments

1. Chotila Taluka
2. Muli Taluka

== Members of Legislative Assembly ==
Year	Member	Party
2007	Popatbhai Jinjariya	Indian National Congress
2012	Shamji Chauhan	Bharatiya Janata Party
2017	Rutvik Makwana	Indian National Congress
2022	Shamji Chauhan	Bharatiya Janata Party

== Election results ==
=== 2022 ===
Gujarat Assembly Election, 2022
Party	Candidate	Votes	%	±%
BJP	Shamji Chauhan	71,039	42.52	
INC	Rutvik Makwana	43,332	25.94	
AAP	Raju Karpada	45,397	27.17	New
Majority			15.35	
Turnout		167,079		
BJP gain from INC		Swing		

=== 2017 ===
Gujarat Legislative Assembly Election, 2017: Chotila
Party	Candidate	Votes	%	±%
INC	Rutvik Makwana	79,960	53.3	
BJP	Dervaliya Zinabhai Najabhai	56073	37.3	
NOTA	None of the Above	2581		
Majority				
Turnout				
Registered electors		230,619		

=== 2012 ===
Gujarat Assembly Election, 2012: Chotila
Party	Candidate	Votes	%	±%
BJP	Shamji Chauhan	72,111	50.13	
INC	Devjibhai Govindbhai Fatepara	60,139	41.81	
Majority		11,972	8.32	
Turnout		1,43,854	71.80	
BJP gain from INC		Swing		

== See also ==
- List of constituencies of the Gujarat Legislative Assembly
- Surendranagar district
