= Kiritsinh Rana =

Indian politician

Kiritsinh Jitubha Rana
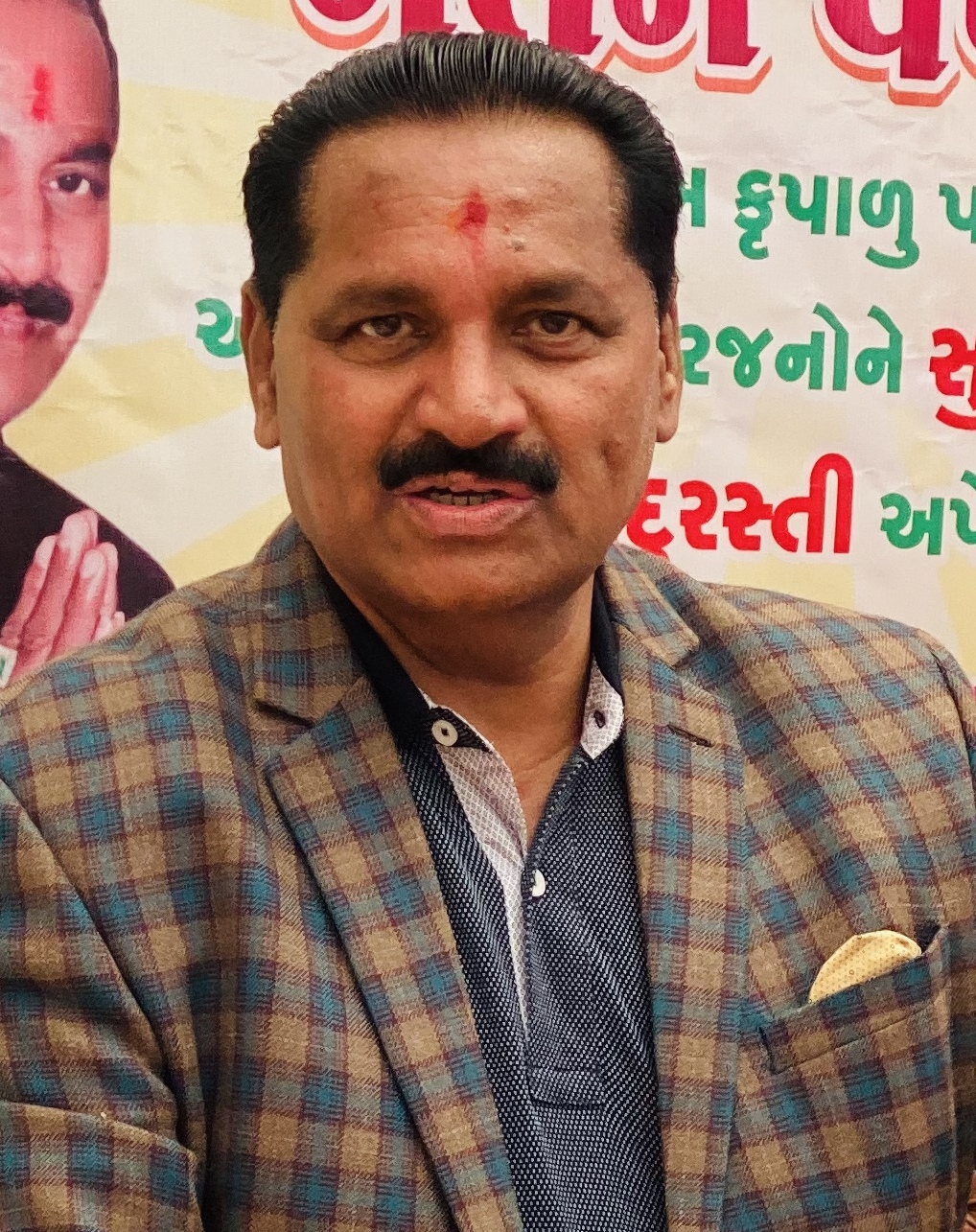

Cabinet Minister of Forest, Environment and Climate Change in Government of Gujarat
- Incumbent
- Assumed office 16 September 2021
- Constituency: Limbdi

Minister of State for Forest & Environment in Government of Gujarat
- In office 2007–2012
- Constituency: Limbdi

MLA of Gujarat
- Incumbent
- Assumed office November 2020
- Constituency: Limbdi
- In office 1995–2002
- Constituency: Limbdi
- In office 2007–2017
- Constituency: Limbdi

Minister of State For Animal Husbandry (Independent Charge) in Government of Gujarat
- In office 1998–2002
- Constituency: Limbdi

Personal details
- Born: 7 July 1964 (age 61) Bhalgamda
- Party: Bhartiya Janata Party
- Children: 1 daughter and 1 son Yuvrajsinh Rana

Kiritsinhji Rana (born 7 July 1964) is currently Cabinet Minister of Forest, Environment, Climate Change, Printing and Stationery in Government of Gujarat. He is Member of Legislative assembly from Limbdi (Vidhan Sabha constituency) in Gujarat . He also served as Minister of Animal Husbandry from 1998 to 2002 and Minister of Forest and Environment from 2007 to 2012. He was also Secretary of Gujarat State (BJP) from 2003 to 2006.

Hathubha {ગેડી} Rana's son helped him when his father entered politics

== Early life ==
Kiritsinh Rana was born on 7 July 1964. He belongs to Rajput Family. His native village is Bhalgamda, Limbdi.
Kiritsinh's father Jitubha Rana was a BJP worker and was elected MLA from Limbdi Vidhansabha in 1982 by polls and again in 1990 elections.

== Political career ==
Elected MLA in 1995 and 1998 from Limbdi.
Minister of Animal husbandry from 1998 to 2002.
Elected MLA in 2007.
Minister of Forest and Environment from 2007 to 2012.
Elected MLA in 2013.
Elected MLA on 10 November 2020.
Appointed Incharge of Devbhoomi Dwarka District BJP in 2021. Appointed Chairman of Panchayat Raj, Gujarat

Appointed Cabinet Minister of Forest and Environment on 16 September 2021.

Elected MLA on 8 December 2022.
