= Sudamda-Dhandalpur =

Sudamda
- Village
- Nickname: Sudalghadh
- Country: India
- State: Gujarat
- Region: Saurashtra
- District: Surendranagar
- Taluka: Sayla

Government
  - Type: Gram Panchayat
  - Body: Sudamda Gram Panchayat
- Elevation: 108 m (354 ft)

Population (2011)
  - Total: 8,286

Languages
  - Official: Gujarati, Sanskrit, English, Hindi
  - Spoken: Gujarati
- Time zone: UTC+5:30 (IST)
- Postal Index Number: 363 440
- Telephone code: +91 02755
- Literacy: 59.19% (2011)
- Driving side: Left

Sudamda-Dhandalpur is a pair of villages in the Surendranagar district of Gujarat state, western India.

== History ==
Sudamda-Dhandalpur was a minor princely state of Jhalawar prant, which during the British Raj was handled by the colonial Eastern Kathiawar Agency.
