= P. K. Parmar =

Indian politician

Parashottam Khengarbhai Parmar (born 1971) is an Indian politician from Gujarat. He is a member of the Gujarat Legislative Assembly from Dasada Assembly constituency, which is reserved for Scheduled Caste community, in Surendranagar district. He won the 2022 Gujarat Legislative Assembly election representing the Bharatiya Janata Party.

== Early life and education ==
Parmar is from Dasada, Surendranagar district, Gujarat. He is the son of Khengarbhai Arjanbhai Parmar. He completed his Civil Engineering at Government Polytechnic College, Rajkot.

== Career ==
Parmar won from Dasada Assembly constituency representing the Bharatiya Janata Party in the 2022 Gujarat Legislative Assembly election. He polled 76,344 votes and defeated his nearest rival and sitting MLA, Naushad Solanki of the Indian National Congress, by a margin of 2,179 votes.
