= Tarnetar =

- village
- Location in Gujarat, India Tarnetar (India)
- Coordinates: 22°38′45″N 71°12′48″E
- Country: India
- State: Gujarat
- District: Surendranagar

Languages
  - Official: Gujarati, Hindi
- Time zone: UTC+5:30 (IST)
- Vehicle registration: GJ-13
- Website: gujaratindia.com

Tarnetar is a village in the Surendranagar district of the state of Gujarat in India. It is situated near the city of Thangadh.

== Trinetreshwar Temple ==
Tarnetar is widely known for the Trinetreshwar temple, and the fair held here. It is believed that the temple belongs to the Solanki Era. The Pratihara kings, predominantly the worshipers of Shiva, were great builders and architecturally brilliant. They were ardent patrons of art and sculpture. The Trinetreshwar temple is an ornate and evolved example of its time portraying the Gurjjar Pratihar style. Owing to the reign of the Pratihar kings, the area was later known as the Panchal region. The temple was later reconstructed by Karansignhji, the king of Lakhtar, in memory of his son, while preserving its original architectural style.

The Tarnetar temple is surrounded by three Kunds : the Vishnu Kund, the Bhrahma Kund and the Shiv Kund - south of which a cellar is built. It is popularly believed that a dip in its waters is as holy as a dip in the sacred River Ganges.

== Tarnetar fair ==
Tarnetar is known for its annual fair, the Trinetreshwar Mahadev Mela, which is held near the Trinetreshwar Mahadev temple. It attracts villagers from all over the region as well as tourists. Around 100,000 people typically attend.

== Transport ==
The nearest domestic airport is 90 kilometres (56 mi) away at Rajkot, and the nearest international airport is at Ahmedabad, 200 kilometres (120 mi) away.

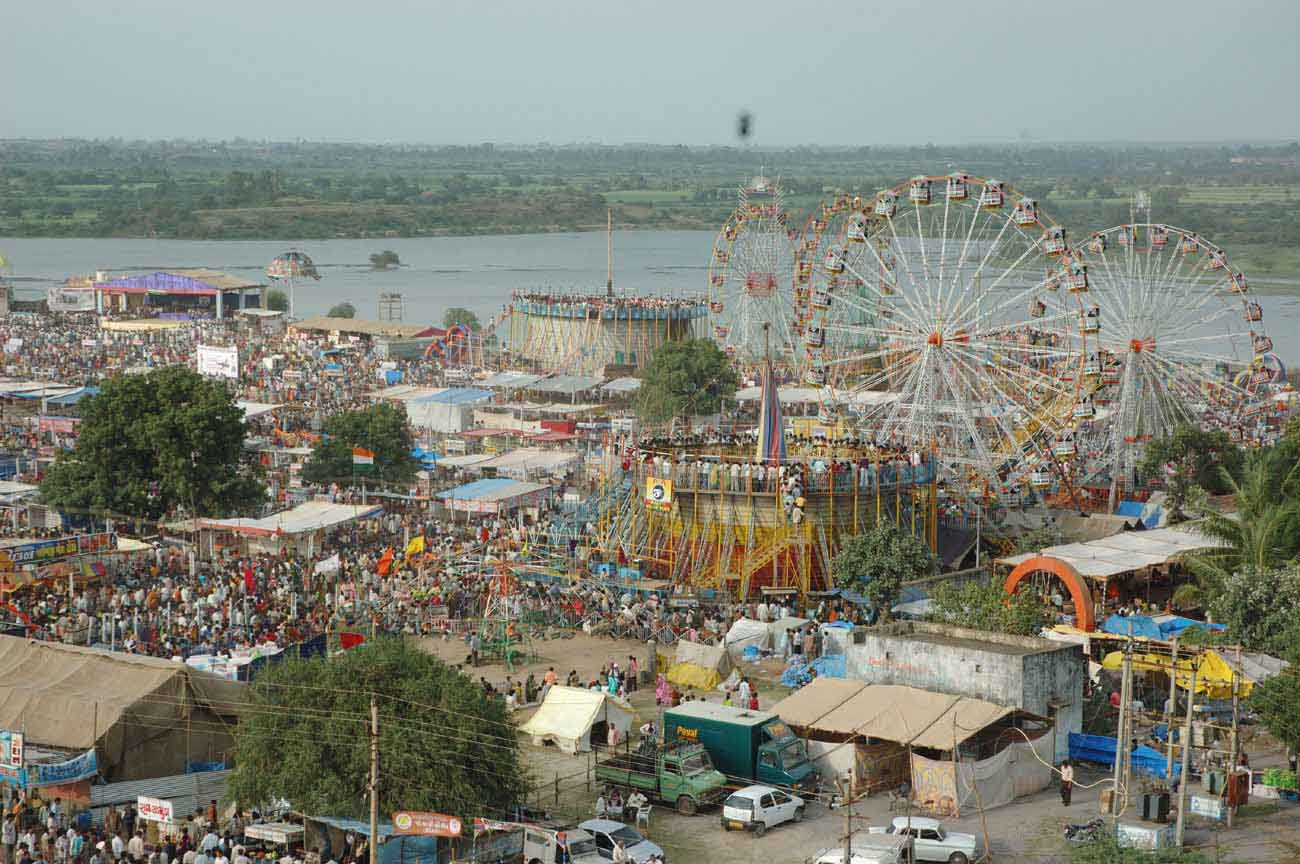
Tarnetar Fair View

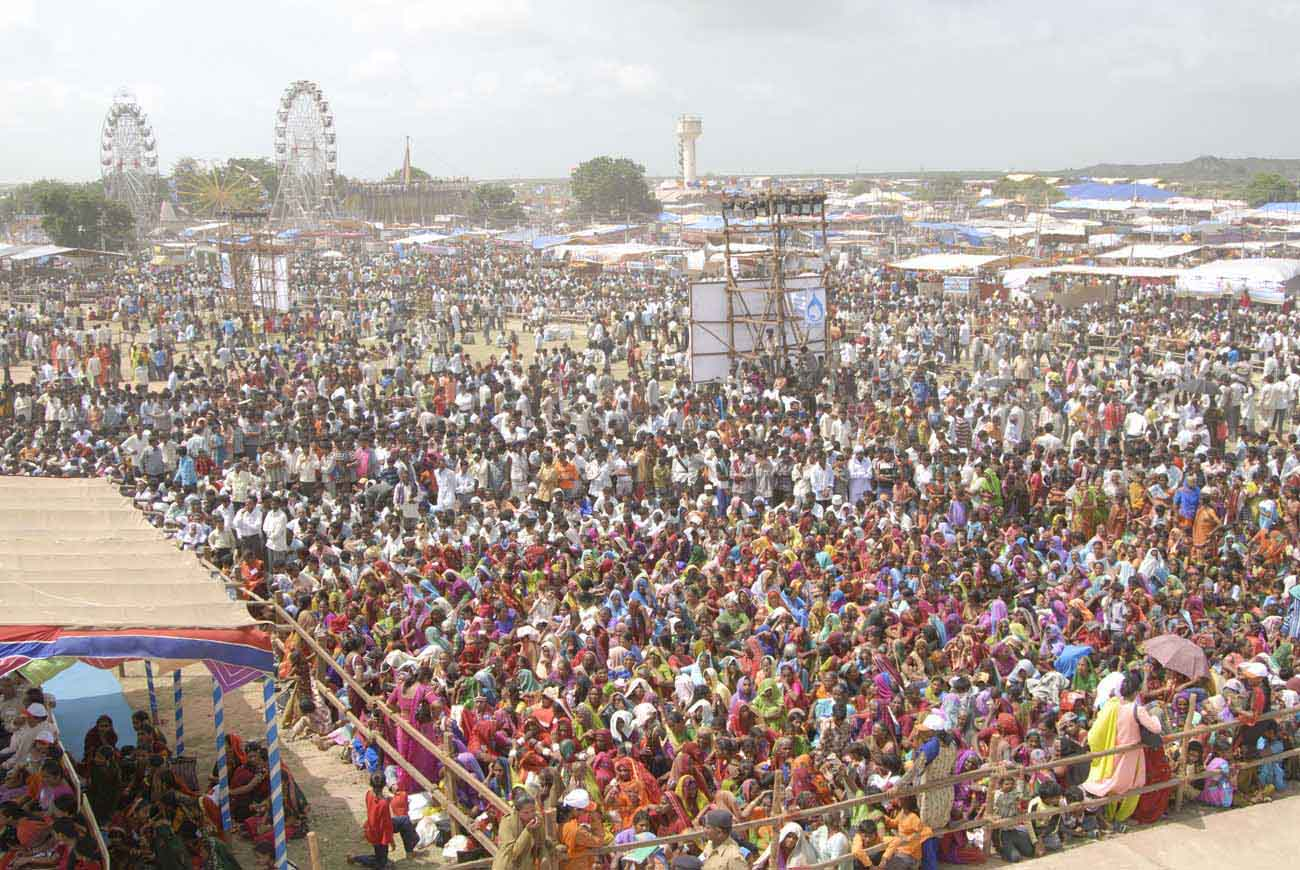
Tarnetar Fair

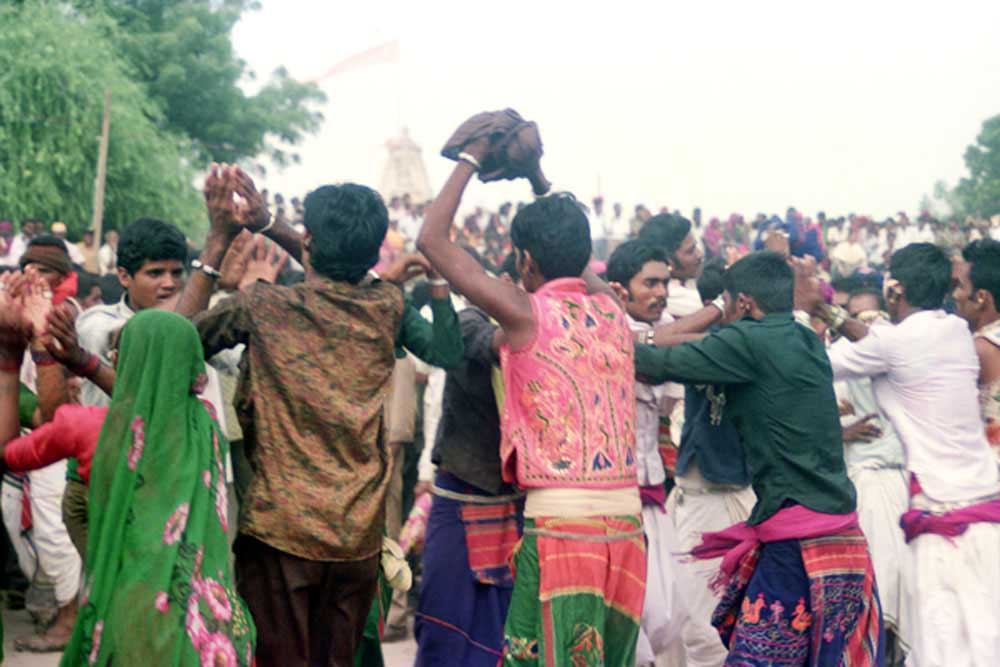
Costumes at Tarnetar fair

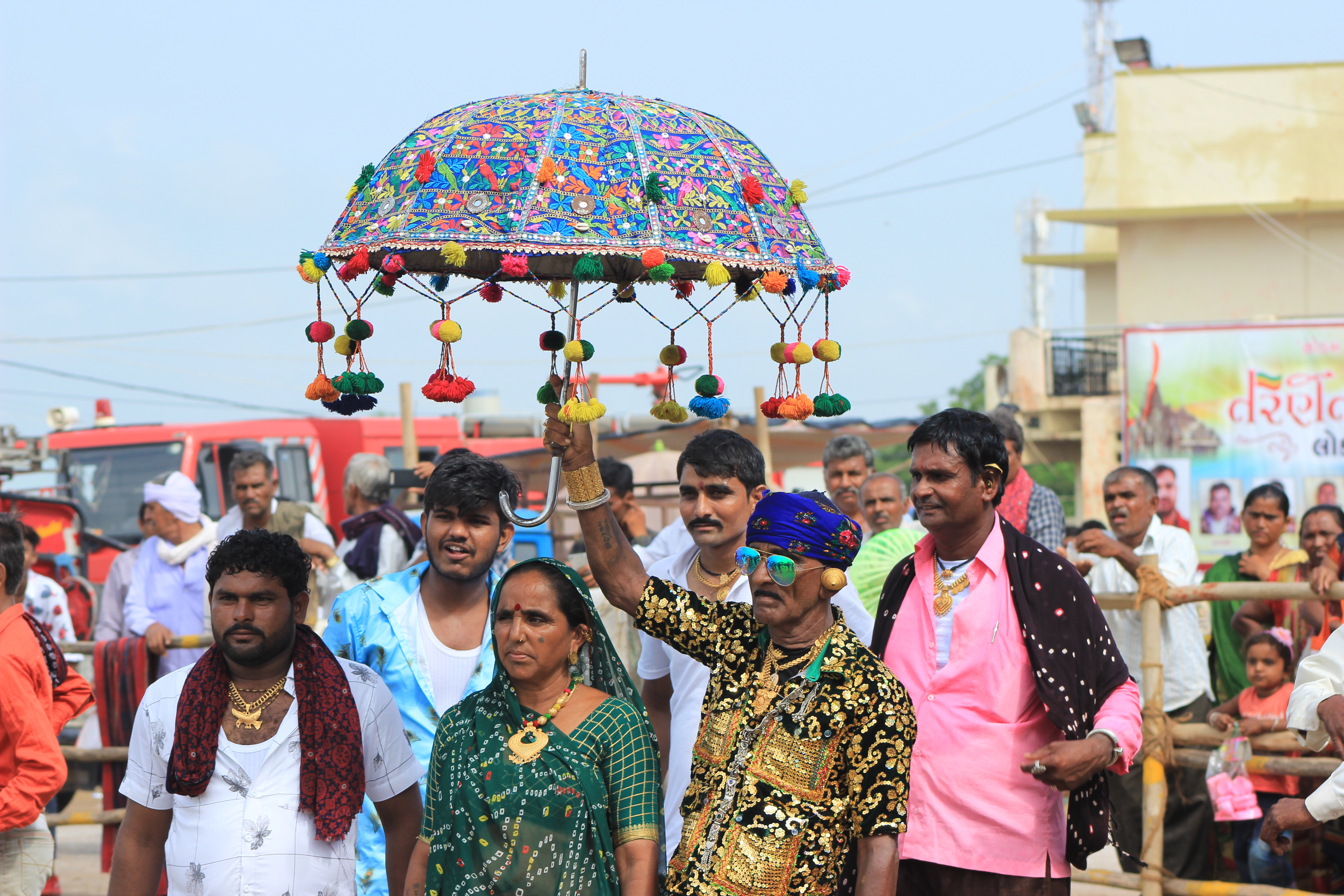
People participating in the fair with the famous umbrella of Tarnetar

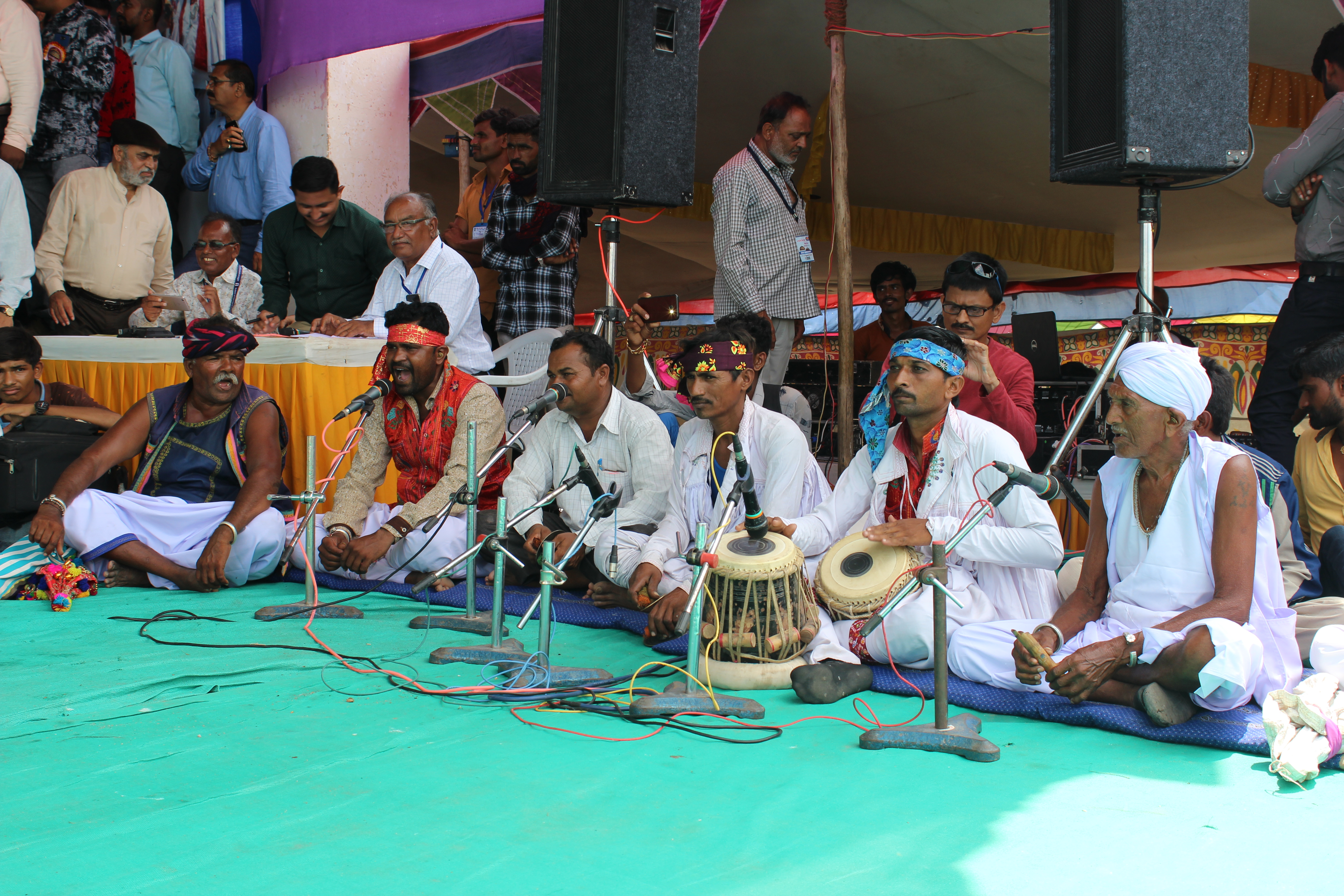
Cultural programme during the fair.

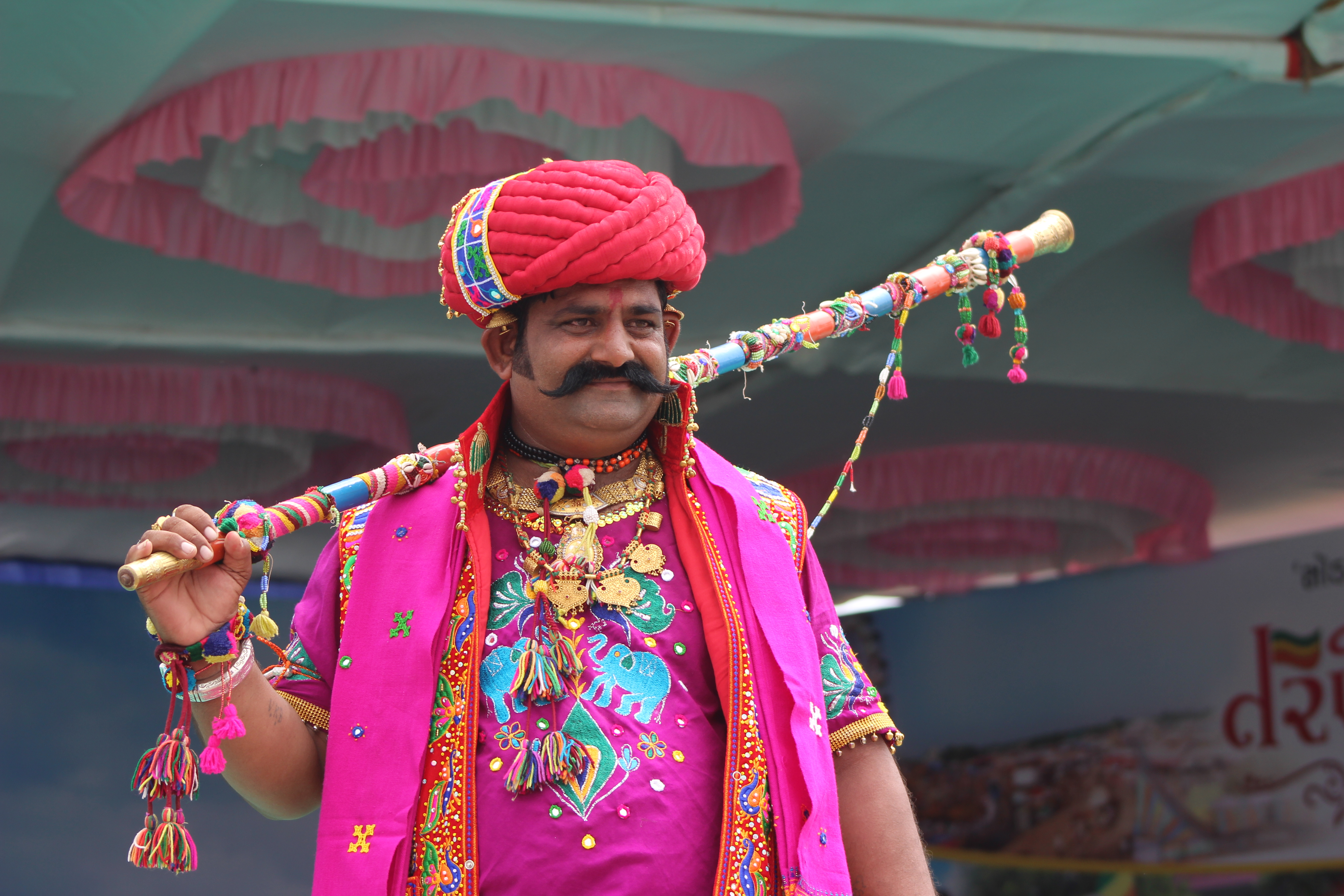
A man in traditional costumes during Tarnetar fair
