= Kharaghoda =

- Census town
- Location in Gujarat, India Kharaghoda (India)
- Coordinates: 23.20008°N 71.72709°E
- Country: India
- State: Gujarat
- District: Surendranagar

Population (2001)
  - Total: 10,927

Languages
  - Official: Gujarati, Hindi
- Time zone: UTC+5:30 (IST)
- Vehicle registration: GJ
- Website: gujaratindia.com

Kharaghoda is a census town in Surendranagar district in the Indian state of Gujarat.

Under the Bombay Presidency of British Raj, Kharaghoda was a part of the then Ahmedabad district, and had the terminus of a branch railway line. A government salt factory was established here under the brand name of "Bharat Salt".

Hindustan Salts Limited, the only public sector company in India engaged in the manufacture and sale of salt, has salt plants in Karaghoda. Recent studies have uncovered that the bitterns produced in Kharaghoda are rich in bromides and can become a source for bromine.

== Demographics ==
As of 2001 India census, Kharaghoda had a population of 10,927. Males constitute 54% of the population and females 46%. Kharaghoda has an average literacy rate of 41%, lower than the national average of 59.5%: male literacy is 52%, and female literacy is 29%. In Kharaghoda, 16% of the population is under 6 years of age.

The main business of the Kharaghoda is salt production. During the British Raj, well water was used to produce salts. The salt is called Varagadum (વરાગડું).

There is one hospital, operated by HSL. There is an old library, started by the British.

Kharaghoda is located at the end of Little Rann of Kutch. In 2006, Rann Utzav was held for the first time there.
