= Rutvikbhai Makwana =

Indian politician

Rutvikbhai Lavjibhai Makwana

Member of the Gujarat Legislative Assembly
- In office 2017–2022
- Governor: Acharya Devvrat
- Preceded by: Shamjibhai Chauhan
- Constituency: Chotila

Personal details
- Born: Rutvikbhai; 15 April 1975 (age 51) Dhajala, Sayala, Surendranagar, Gujarat
- Citizenship: Indian
- Party: Indian National Congress
- Spouse: Bhavnaben Makwana
- Parent: Lavjibhai Makwana (father)
- Profession: Agriculturist

Rutvikbhai Lavjibhai Makwana is an Indian politician. He serves as Member of legislative assembly from Chotila constituency. He is a member of the Indian National Congress. Makwana defeated the BJP's Dervaliya Zinabhai Najabhai in the 2017 election. He was appointed chief organiser of 'Gujarat Pradesh Seva Dal' by Rahul Gandhi in October 2018.

In March 2021, he was arrested by police for his tractor yatra against Narendra Modi in Gujarat. Mr. Makwana belong to the Koli caste of Gujarat state of India.
