= Shamji Chauhan =

Indian politician

Shamji Chauhan (born 1960) is an Indian politician from Gujarat. He is a member of the Gujarat Legislative Assembly from Chotila Assembly constituency in Surendranagar district. He won the 2022 Gujarat Legislative Assembly election representing the Bharatiya Janata Party.

== Early life and education ==
Chauhan is from Rajkot, Gujarat. Hes is the son of Chauhan Bhimajibhai. He passed Class 11 in 1981 at Shree Vallabhbhai Patel Vidyalaya, Sant Kabir Road, Beri Para, Rajkot.

== Career ==
Chauhan won from Chotila Assembly constituency representing the Bharatiya Janata Party in the 2022 Gujarat Legislative Assembly election. He polled 71,039 votes and defeated his nearest rival, Raju Karpada of the Aam Aadmi Party, by a margin of 25,642 votes. He first became an MLA winning the 2012 Gujarat Legislative Assembly election. In 2012, he polled 72,11 votes and defeated Devjibhai Govindbhai Fatepara of the Indian National Congress, by a margin of 11,792 votes.
