= Dasada Assembly constituency =

Legislative Assembly constituency in Gujarat State, India

Coordinates: 23.32°N 71.83°E

Dasada
- Constituency No. 60 for the Gujarat Legislative Assembly

Constituency details
- Country: India
- Region: Western India
- State: Gujarat
- District: Surendranagar
- Lok Sabha constituency: Surendranagar
- Established: 1972
- Total electors: 264,687
- Reservation: SC

Member of Legislative Assembly
- 15th Gujarat Legislative Assembly
- Incumbent P. K. Parmar
- Party: Bharatiya Janata Party
- Elected year: 2022

Dasada is one of the 182 Legislative Assembly constituencies of Gujarat state in India. It is part of Surendranagar district and is reserved for candidates belonging to the Scheduled Castes.

== List of segments ==
This assembly seat represents the following segments

1. Dasada Taluka

2. Lakhtar Taluka

3. Limbadi Taluka (Part) Villages – Moti Kathechi, Nani Kathechi, Gadthal, Jaliyala, Bhagwanpar, Ranagadh, Fulwadi, Rojasar, Dhalwana, Mulbavla, Digvijaygadh, Dhirajgadh, Parali, Bhathan, Laxmisar, Shiyani, Jambu, Parnala, Jasmatpar, Jalampar.

== Members of the Legislative Assembly ==
Year	Member	Picture	Party
2007	Shambhuprasad Tundiya		Bharatiya Janata Party
2012	Punambhai Makwana		Bharatiya Janata Party
2017	Solanki Naushadji Bhalajibhai		Indian National Congress
2022	P. K. Parmar		Bharatiya Janata Party

== Election results ==
=== 2022 ===
Gujarat Assembly election, 2022:Dasada Assembly constituency
Party	Candidate	Votes	%	±%
BJP	P. K. Parmar	76,344	45.56	+0.15
INC	Naushad Solanki	74165	44.26	−3.55
AAP	Arvindbhai Kalubhai Solanki	10324	6.16	+5.30
NOTA	None of the above	3147	1.88	
Majority		2,179	1.3	
Turnout				
Registered electors		260,345		

=== 2017 ===
Gujarat Legislative Assembly Election, 2017: Dasada
Party	Candidate	Votes	%	±%
INC	Solanki Naushadji Bhalajibhai	74,009	47.81	+6.71
BJP	Ramanlal Isvarlal Vora	70281	45.41	−3.67
Majority		3728	2.40	
Turnout		154782	65.16	
INC gain from BJP				

=== 2012 ===
Gujarat Assembly Election, 2012: Dasada
Party	Candidate	Votes	%	±%
BJP	Punambhai Makwana	65,504	49.08	
INC	Manharlal Makwana	54764	41.10	
Majority		10640	7.98	
Turnout		133254	65.04	
BJP hold		Swing		

== See also ==
- List of constituencies of the Gujarat Legislative Assembly
- Surendranagar district
