= Bhogavo River =

Coordinates: 22°23′16″N 72°22′03″E

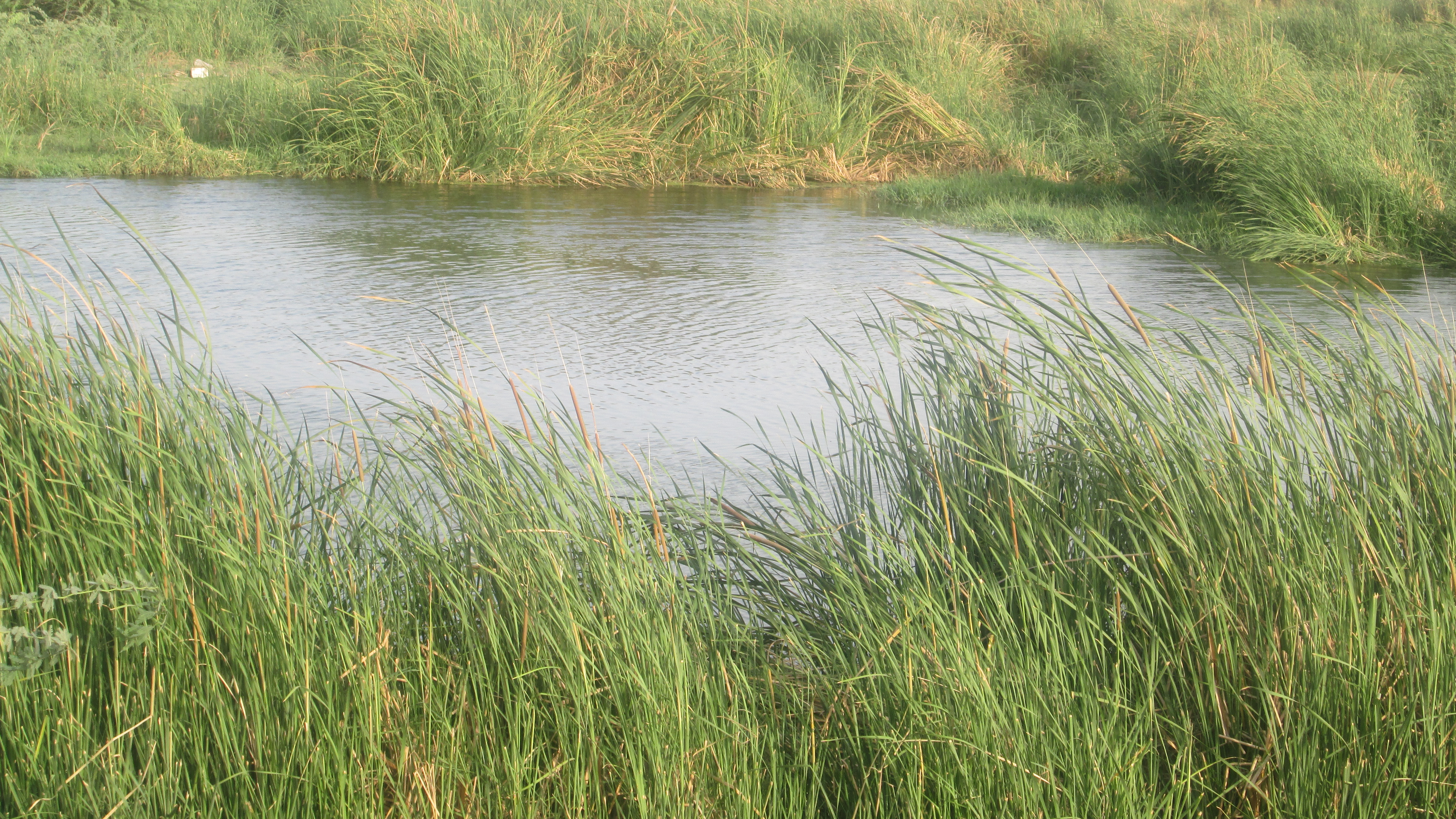

Bhogavo River is a river in Gujarat, India. It is a major right tributary of the Sabarmati River. The city of Surendranagar is on the banks of the Bhogavo. Dholidhaja Dam is located on the river. The film Guide's climax was shot in the town of Limbdi, 90 km from Ahmedabad on the Bhogavo River. The Harappan port city Lothal is located along Bhogava River.
