= Zinzuwada =

Town in Gujarat state, India

Coordinates: 23.3500°N 71.7000°E

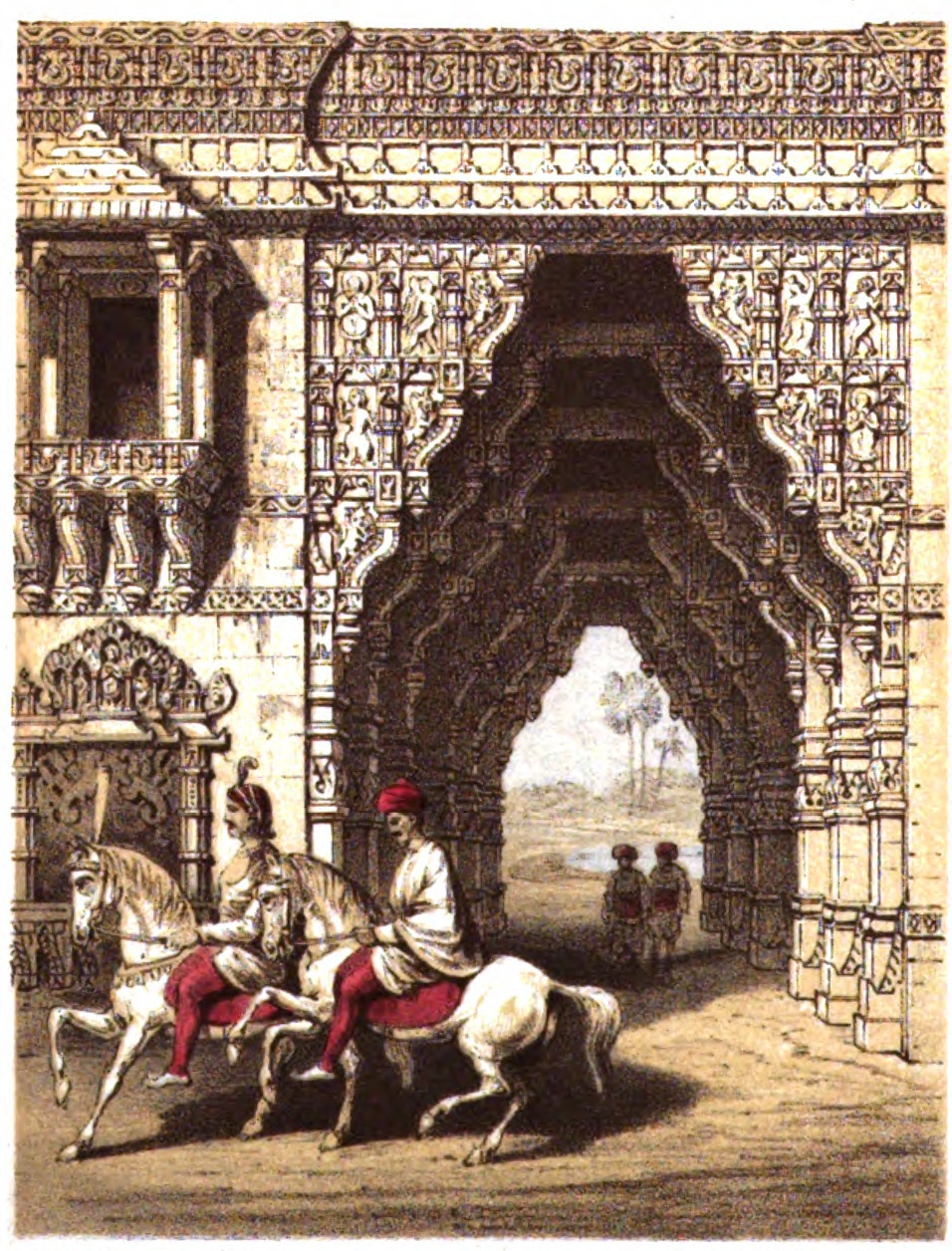
Gateway of the fort, Zinzuwada

Zinzuwada, also spelled Jhinjhuvada or Jhinjhuwada is a town in Dasada Taluka of Surendranagar district, Gujarat, India.

== History ==
According to a legend the town was founded by Zanz Lambariya. He had advised Mayanalla Devi, wife of Chaulukya ruler Karna, to take blessings from a hermit living on an island in the Rann of Kutch. She later gave birth to Jayasimha Siddharaja who named the place where he lived as Zinzuwada after him.

The core town is surrounded by 11th century fort built during the rule of Chaulukya dynasty. There are inscriptions on the walls of the fort ascribed to Udayana, a minister of Jayasimha Siddharaja.

It was a non-salute princely state on Saurashtra peninsula during British Raj. The princely state in Jhalawar prant. In 1901, it comprised 18 villages, covering 165 square miles, with a population of 11,732, yielding 73,343 Rupees state revenue (1903-4, mostly from land), paying 11,075 Rupees tribute to the British.

== Places of interest ==
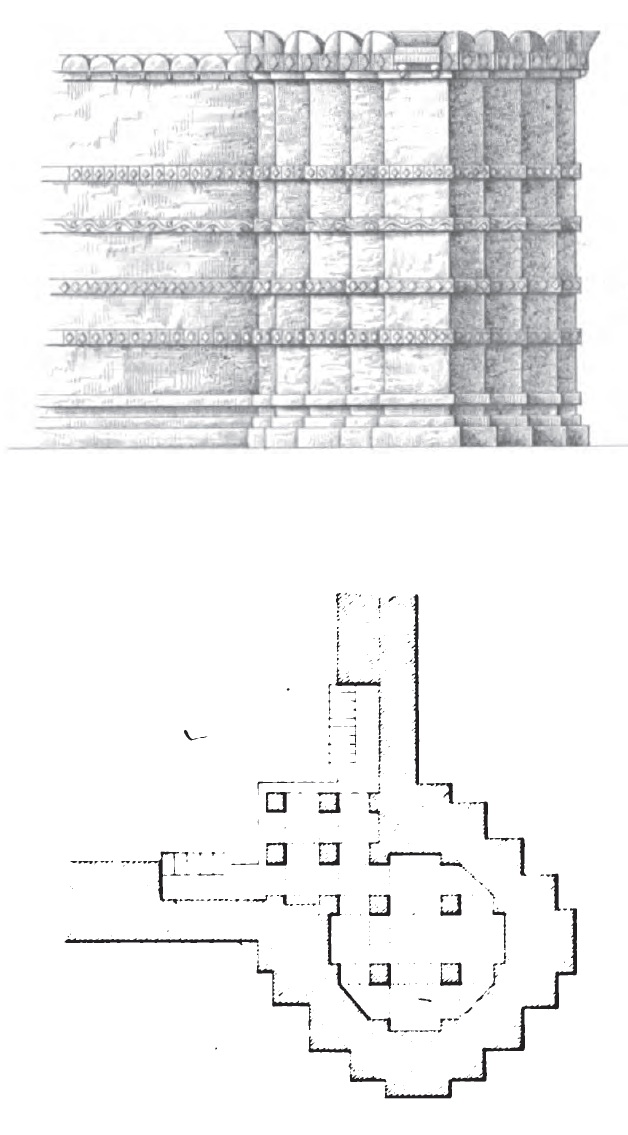
Plan and elevation of corner tower of the fort of Zinzuwada

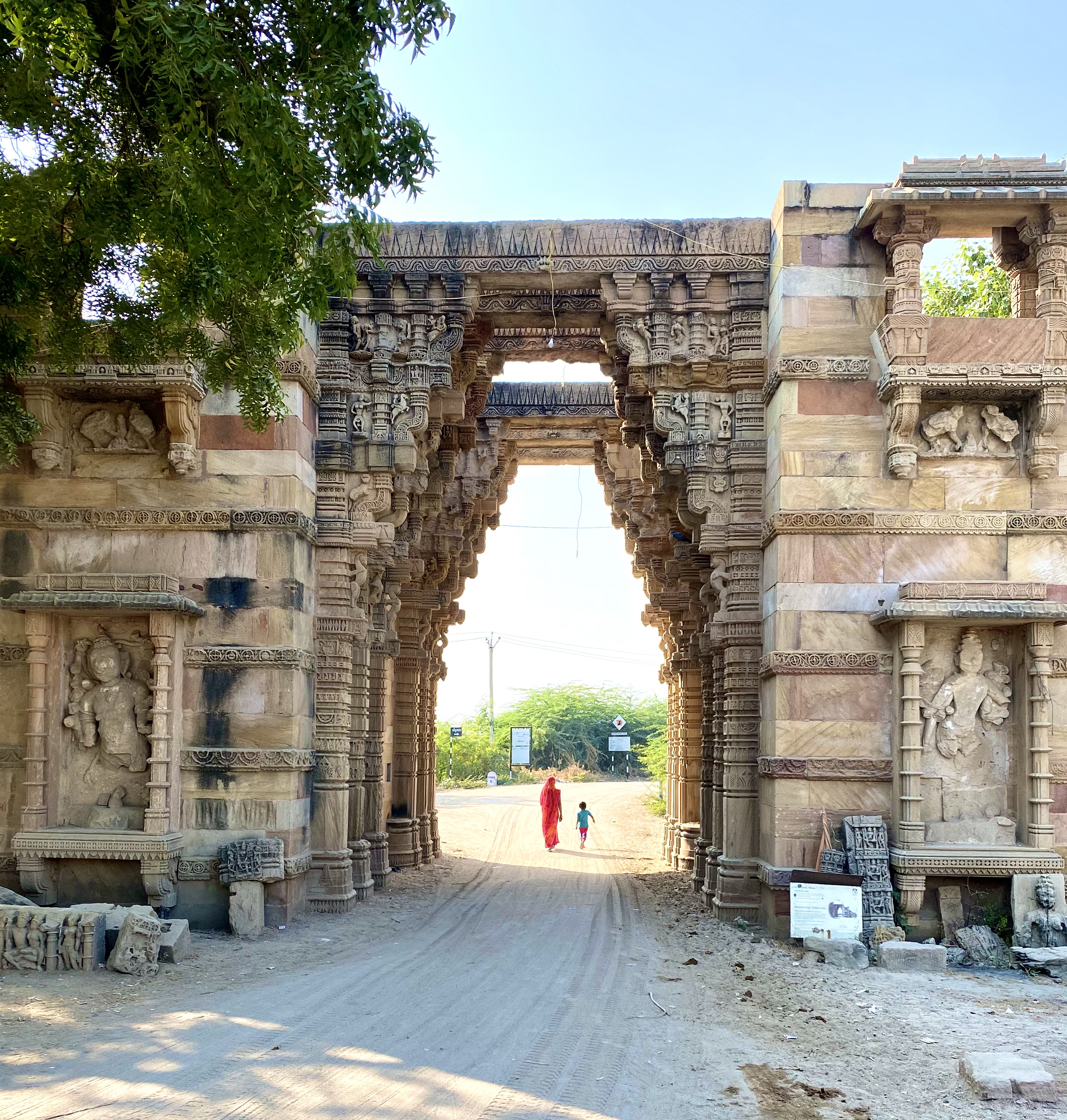
Madapol Gate

=== Fort and gateways ===
The fort is built with large stone slabs and broad. It is considered as the finest example of Hindu fortification in India along with the Dabhoi fort. The town planning, gateways and decoration of them are according to the Hindu architectural treatises.

There are four gateways in four directions; Madapol Gate, Rakshaspol Gate, Harijan Gate and Dhama Gate. Madapol Gate is fine brackets resting on the pillars and supporting the roof. It is an example of Maru-Gurjara styled gate. The lower niches in the gates houses various Hindu deities while upper niches have well carved balconies.

=== Others ===
The town has a Kund (stepwell), sinhsar lake and the Jhileshwar Mahadev temple dated to Chaulukya era.

== Notable people ==
- Acharya Yashovijaysuri

== External links and Sources ==
- Imperial Gazetteer, on DSAL.UChicago.edu - Kathiawar
