= Varsa Doshi =

Indian politician

MLA of Gujarat
- In office 2007–2017
- Constituency: Wadhwan

Personal details
- Party: Bhartiya Janata Party

Varsa Doshi is a Member of Legislative assembly from Wadhwan constituency in Gujarat for its 12th legislative assembly.
