= Dhrangadhra =

- Town
- Nickname: Pink City
- Location in Gujarat, India Dhrangadhra (India)
- Coordinates: 22.98°N 71.47°E
- Country: India
- State: Gujarat
- District: Surendranagar
- Elevation: 64 m (210 ft)

Population (2011)
  - Total: 75,133

Languages
  - Official: Gujarati, Hindi, English
- Time zone: UTC+5:30 (IST)
- Postal code: 363310
- Vehicle registration: GJ 13
- Website: gujaratindia.gov.in

Dhrangadhra is a town, taluka headquarters and a municipality in Surendranagar district in the state of Gujarat, India. During the period of the British Raj, the city was the capital of Dhrangadhra State, one of the eight first-class princely states (13-gun salute) of the Kathiawar Agency in the Bombay Presidency.

== Etymology ==
The name is believed to be inspired by stone bedrock found immediately under the soil of the place; "dhunge dhara" or "dhingi dhara" meaning "stable land".

== History ==
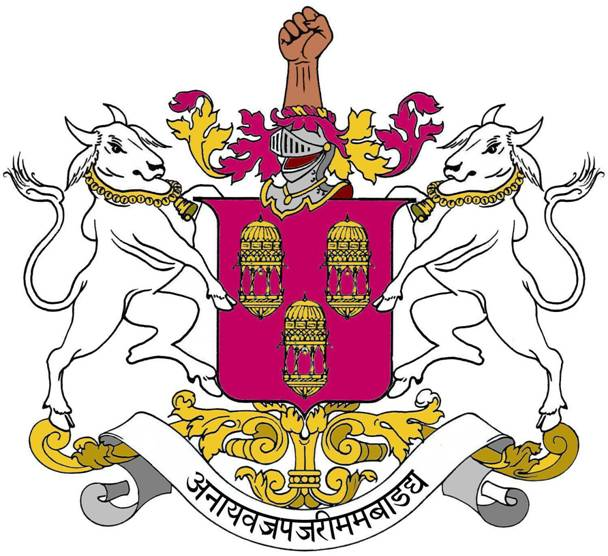
Coat of arms of Dhrangadhra state

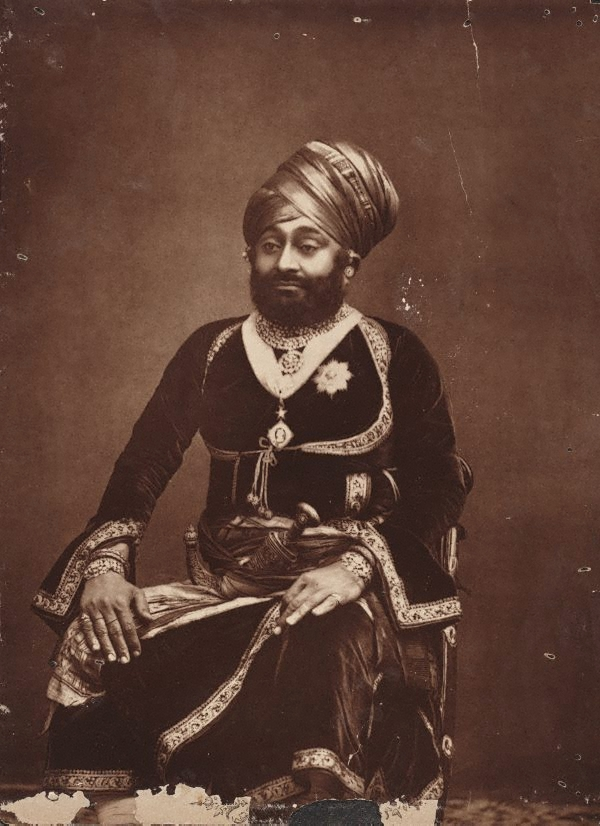
Portrait of H.H. Man Singh, Raja of Dhrangadhra (1837-1900)

Dhrangadhra has a long history, starting from the Lower Paleolithic period. The river named Falku passes from Dhrangadhra town. The evidence is from the river bed of the Bhadar river which flows along the Dhragadhra taluka. Moreover, there are many Harappan-period sites. Recent studies in the area suggest that the Dhragadhra and Halvad taluka were the frontiers of the so-called sorat Harappans which bifurcates the Sidhi Harrapans of Kutch & Sindh.

Dhrangadhra has a long history, starting from the Lower Paleolithic period. The river named Falku passes from Dhrangadhra town. The evidence is from the river bed of the Bhadar river which flows along the Dhragadhra taluka. Moreover, there are many Harappan-period sites. Recent studies in the area suggest that the Dhragadhra and Halvad taluka were the frontiers of the so-called sorat Harappans which bifurcates the Sidhi Harrapans of Kutch & Sindh.

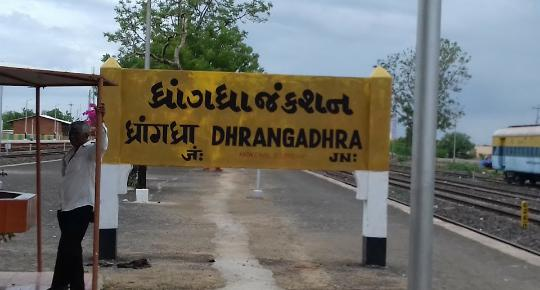
DCW Colony, State Highway 20, Dhrangadhra

=== Modern history ===
Dhrangadhra grew from Jhalawad Princely State, which was founded about AD 1090. This state was ruled by the Jhala Rajputs. In 1735, Dhrangadhra was founded as its capital. The state was then renamed Dhrangadhra-Halvad state from the earlier name of Kuwa, Halwad.

In 1941 the princely state of Dhrangadhra had a population of 94,417 in an area of 1,167 square miles.

In 1925, India's first soda ash factory was founded in Dhrangadhra. It was taken over by Shreyans Prasad Jain, who established the Dhrangadhra Chemical Works (now known as DCW) in 1939. DCW is currently the largest industry there, and is the main source of employment.

In 1948, the state of Dhrangadhra was made part of the Jhalawad district in Saurashtra. In 1956 it became part of Gujarat. Dhrangadhra also contains the Gobar gas plant, which is located at Navalgadh village.

Shree Swaminarayan Sanskardham Gurukul celebrates Rath Yatra festival with devotees of the Dhrangadhra city every year with spirits of Samp Sneha and Suhradbhav. Bhagwatdham Gurukul is a religious place to worship.

== Geography ==
Dhrangadhra is located at 22.98°N 71.47°E. It has an average elevation of 64 metres (209 feet).

== Demographics ==
As of 2001 India census, Dhrangadhra had a population of 75,133. Males constitute 54% of the population and females 46%. Dhrangadhra has an average literacy rate of 68%, higher than the national average of 59.5%: male literacy is 75% and, female literacy is 59%. In Dhrangadhra, 12% of the population is under 6 years of age. Juna Ghanshyamgadh is also located near Dhrangdhara.

With both sacred and secular architecture influenced by local medieval history, Dhangadhra today is a modern town with a population of about 100,000, which includes Hindus, Muslims, Zoroastrians, Jains and Christians. The affluent are traders in the local cotton and salt trade that has existed for over 300 years, while the majority are farmers and shopkeepers. It has industries such as DCW with chemical products, Mausam brand food products such as Spices, delicious pickles in various flavours, sauces, pastes, sherbets, and ketchup by K.P. Industries and many other industries in GIDC area. The provincial town boasts several hospitals, schools and a college. Along with regular telephone and portal services, mail and courier facilities are also available in the town.

The Rabari and Bharwad farming communities that raise cattle, sheep, goat and camels live in villages surrounding the town. Each summer, the outskirts of the town also hosts a camp of snake charmers.

Dhangadhra is a railway junction on the Western Railway (India) and is connected to Ahmedabad and other regions of Kutch and Saurashtra by road and rail links. There are auto rickshaws (three-wheeler hooded taxis) and larger un-hooded three-wheelers called Chhakada which typically run on modified Royal Enfield engines, are available for travel within the town and surrounding areas.

Dhrangadhra is also the headquarters of the Deputy Conservator of Forests, which is responsible for the Wild Ass Wildlife Sanctuary on the Little Rann of Kutch, home to the last three species of Asiatic Wild Ass.

== Culture and places of interest ==
- The Radha Krishna Temple at Army Cantonment
- Mausam Pickle Factory (authorization needed)
- The Palace (authorization needed)
- Falku Dam
- Girdharji Haveli
- Jaleshwar Mahadev Temple
- Phuleshwar Mahadev Temple
- BAPS Swaminarayan Temple
- Rokadiya Hanuman Temple, has a lot of tortoises that are very old
- hareswar Mahadev (narali)
- Dhrangadhra Chemical Works
- Jogasar Lake (Ek-danta Ganpati, Jogeshwar Mahadev)
- Shree Swaminarayan Sanskardham Gurukul
- Vanraj Hanumanj Temple (Dhori Talavadi)
- Bhala Hanuman Temple
- Rokadiya Hanuman Temple
- Trimandir

== Culture ==
Temples, step-wells, palaces and mosques from various historical periods exist in various states of preservation. There are more than 100 places of worship, and ancient art and craft traditions such as stone sculpture, jewellery making, tie and dye fabrics and embroidery prosper.

- B.A.P.S. Swaminaryan Temple Dhrangadhra, GJ SH 7, Panchavati Society (Pramuk Swami Mandir)
- Bhagwatdham, Shri Swaminarayan Gurukul, Halvad road, Near Ahmedabad- Maliya Bye Pass, GJ SH 7, Bhagwatdham Society, Dhrangadhra
- Shree Swaminarayan Sanskardham Gurukul, Halwad road, Dhrangadhra
- One of the ancient Ek-Dantay Ganpati temples, famous as Jogasar
- Shitla Maa Temple, in the northern suburban area
- There is a Deshal Bhagat temple (Desal Bhagat of Rajput Samaj) situated outside the city, believed that god himself took the form of Saint Deshal Bhagat one time.
- Also there are ashrams of Valbai Maa, Bhala Hanumaan Mandir, Fuleshwar Mahadev temple, Rokadiya Hanumanji temple, Bala Hanumanji temple, Dariyalal temple, Jalaram bapa temple, Shakti ma temple.
- There is a dargah of Shahid Muhammed Musa in the Raj Darabar (Man Mahelat).
- Man Mehlat Palace [Raj mahel], Dholidhar, Dhrangadhra in the town centre is well preserved.
- Ajitnivas Palace complex, DCW Colony, Dhrangadhra is another palatial complex located southerly
- Taranga Vihar Dham located far along highway near Chuli after Soladi railway station is a popular destination close to Dhanrgadhra.
- Matrivav, Kankavati - a historic well preserved step-well is located 15 km far northwesterly

Dhrangadhra is famous for its stone artwork. The Government of Gujarat (Department of Industries and Mines and Commissioner of Geology & Mining) has set up two prestigious Stone Artisan Park Training Institutes (SAPTIs) - one each at Dhrangadhra and Ambaji in the state. Training centre in Dhrangadhra is located 3 km from the town on Halvad bypass road, near railway crossing. Traditionally, the 'Sompura' caste from Dhrangadhra have built and designed many Jain derasars - a type of temple of the Jain people all over Gujarat and India. It is known that the temple of Somnath is built by the Sompura caste living in Dhrangadhra.

== See also ==
- Dhrangadhra (Vidhan Sabha constituency)
- Kondh
