= Chotila =

- Town
- Chamunda Devi Temple in Chotila

- Location in Gujarat, India Chotila (India)
- Coordinates: 22.425°N 71.188°E
- Country: India
- State: Gujarat
- District: Surendranagar

Languages
  - Official: Gujarati, Hindi
- Time zone: UTC+5:30 (IST)
- Vehicle registration: GJ-13

Chotila is a Hindu temple town and Taluka headquarters of Chotila Taluka, Surendranagar district, located near Rajkot, Gujarat, India.

Nearby railway stations included Than & Rajkot. The distance from the Than junction to Chotila is 21 km and Distance from Rajkot railway junction to Than is 47 km.

== History ==
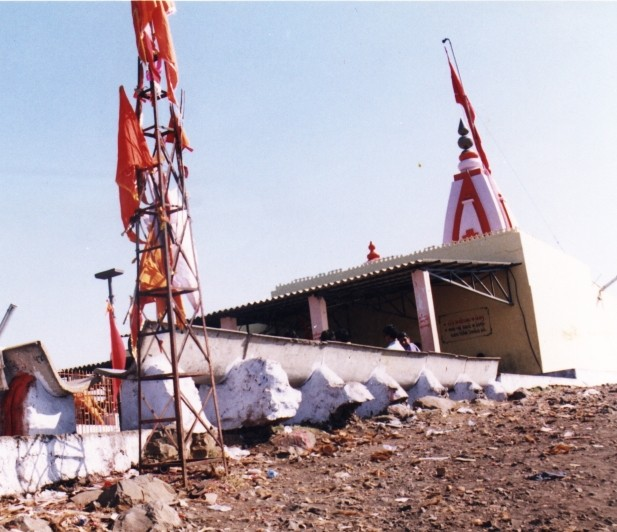
Temple of Chamunda Mata on Chotila hill

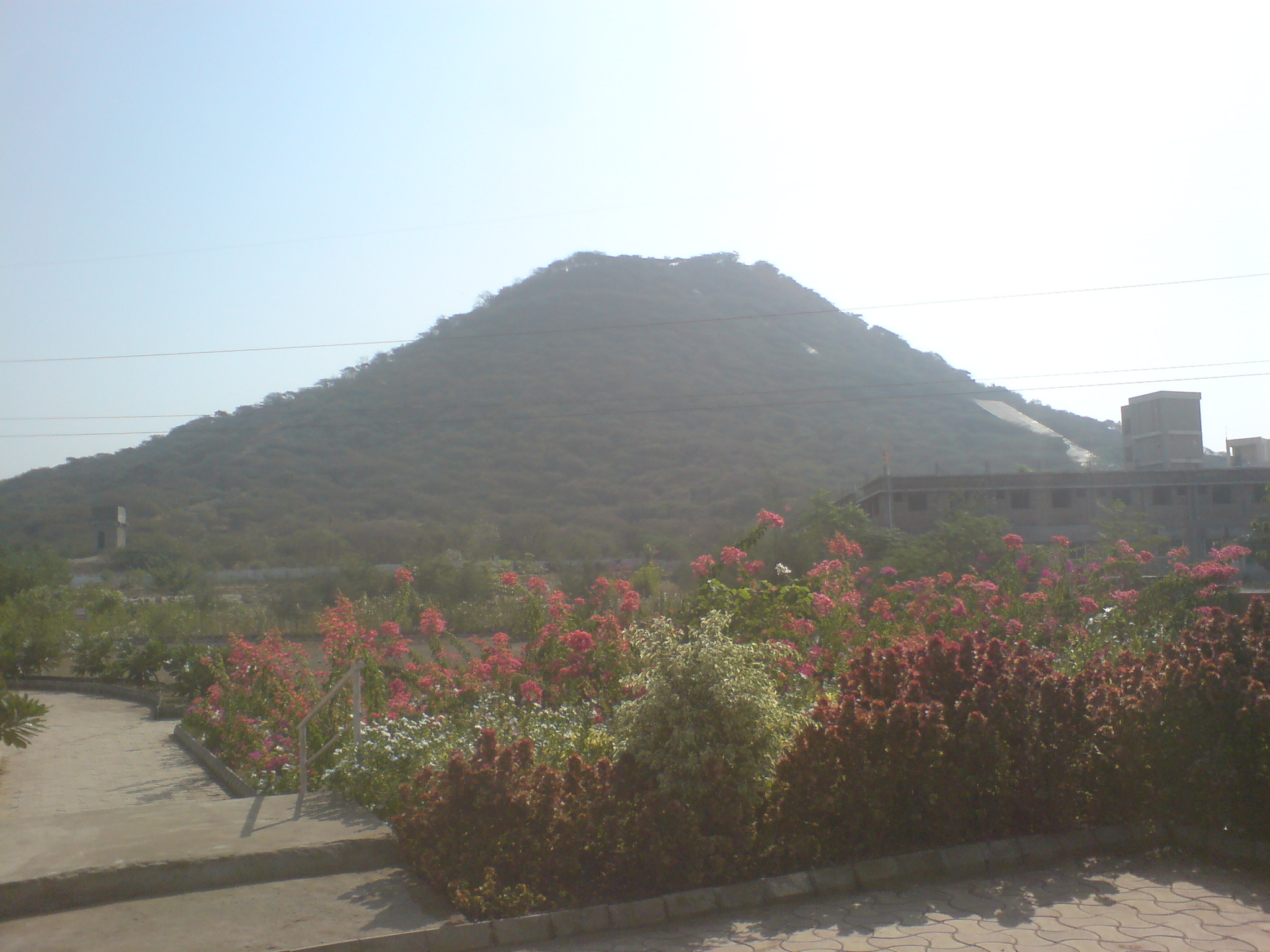
Bhaktivan Garden, at the base of Chotila hill

Chotila was known as Chotgadh in ancient times. It was originally a holding of the Sodha Parmars, but was seized from Jagsio Parmar by the Nag Khachar who was son of Samat Khachar. Kathis who made it one of their principal seats. Chotila was acquired by the Kathis in 1566 CE. Nag Khachar's son was Mulu Khachar. Mulu Khachar's son was Krupa, Devayat and Samat Khachar. Krupa Khachar holds villages as Samadhiyala, Korda and Gangajal. Devayat Khachar holds !atra.

Prominent literary figure Jhaverchand Meghani was born in Chotila and the Government College has been named in his honor as Raashtreeya Shaayar Zaverchand Meghani College.

== Demographics ==
The population, according to the census of 1872, was 1771, and according to that of 1881 was recorded as being 2029. It currently has a population of nearly 20,000.

== Places of interest ==
The Chamund or Chotila hill which is surmounted by the temple of Chamunda is 1173 feet in height.

== Administration ==
The town is administered by Nagarpalika.

== See also ==
- Jhaverchand Meghani
- Sayla
