= Thangadh =

- city
- Location in Gujarat, India Thangadh (India)
- Coordinates: 22°34′N 71°11′E
- Country: India
- State: Gujarat
- District: Surendranagar

Population (2011)
  - Total: 42,351

Language
  - Official: Gujarati, Hindi
- Time zone: UTC+5:30 (IST)
- Postal code: 363530
- Vehicle registration: GJ
- Website: gujaratindia.com

Thangadh (Than) is an industrial city of Surendranagar district in the state of Gujarat, India. The municipality is functioning in Than. Saurashtra was once called Patad region by snake worshipers, an example of which is the Vasuki temple in Than. In and around Thane are found temples in the form of the god of snakes. Their places of importance are Vasuki, Bandiabeli, Chandra-Lipia, Shapar etc. Vasuki Takshak was the chief of the Shesh-nag serpent dynasty. Vasuki was the ancestral god of the royal Lakhtar family of Than.

Kandora of Savaso square mile of jhalawad is called "Panchal" and "Than" has been the center of Panchal. Although Than is an ancient place, its original name and ancient references are found only in "Skanda Puran". It referred to Than as a "place". But gradually the name of the village became known as "Than" due to the word "Sthan" in the vernacular. The places of Than, Bandia Bailey, Talsania, and Charmaliya in Jhalawad are well known in Nag puja.

Than Lakhtar was under the rule of Zala. The royal ‘Abherajji’ of Lakhtar once encamped at the seam of Thane on the way from Lakhtar to Wankaner. Than was ruled by the Madisas at that time. According to folklore, Vasuki came to King Abherajji in a dream. Then came the war between Zala's and madiyao. It was conquered by King Abherajji and for the fulfillment of his dream he built a temple at Than of Vasuki three hundred years ago.

On September 6, 2016, Thangadh taluka was formed by separating Chotila taluka of Surendranagar district and Thangadh was made the taluka headquarters.

== Culture ==
Thangadh is called the land of the snake. Dev Nag Vasuki is worshiped in the city, who is a rustic god. The Vasuki mandir [temple] is located near the Pritam pond, and is visited by devotes visit on the occasion of Nag Panchami.

Saurashtra was once called the Paanchal Pradesh[Birthplace of Draupadi] reigned by the Snake Worshipers. The Vasuki Mandir is situated in Than. Small miniature shrines dedicated to the Snake-God have been built in Surendranagar and adjoining places. Vasuki-Bhandiyabeli, Chandra Lipya-Shapar-Nagadka are the important ones. Vasuki Takshak - Shesh was the chief of the Naga-Sarp ancestry and Vasuki was the ancestral god of the royal Lakthar family of Than. The Snake worship subsequently became prevalent, and related rituals are still performed.

Tarnetar is 10 km away, where there is an annual international fair, Mela in Gujarati, held around first week of the Hindu month of Bhadarva.[August–September]

== Demographics ==
As of 2001 India census, Thangadh had a population of more than 75,000. Males constitute 53% of the population and females 47%. Thangadh has an average literacy rate of 59%, lower than the national average of 59.5%: male literacy is 67%, and female literacy is 49%. In Thangadh, 16% of the population is aged under 6 years.

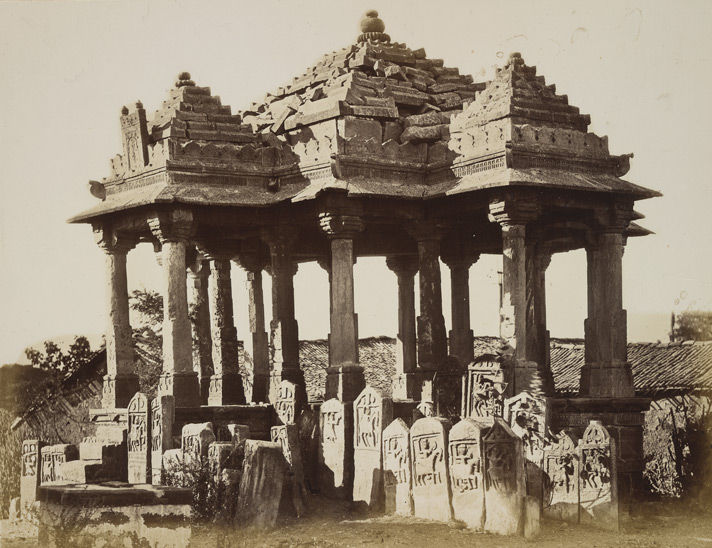
Chhatri and Paliyas at Thangadh photographed in 1874 by James Burgess

== Railway junction ==
Thangadh is served by the railway station of Than. There are total 2 platforms. The new building of station and other platforms are under construction. There are 3 platforms and Double Line track will be established.
