= Wadhwan =

City in Gujarat, India

Wadhwan Vadhwan
- City
- Location in Gujarat, India Wadhwan (India)
- Coordinates: 22°42′40.916″N 71°40′23.867″E
- Country: India
- State: Gujarat
- District: Surendranagar district

Government
  - Body: Surendranagar Wadhwn Municipality

Population (2011)
  - Total: 75,755

Languages
  - Official: Gujarati, Hindi
- Time zone: UTC+5:30 (IST)
- PIN: 363030
- Telephone code: 02752
- Vehicle registration: GJ-13
- Website: www.census2011.co.in/data/subdistrict/3792-wadhwan-surendranagar-gujarat.html

Wadhwan, also spelled Vadhwan, is a city and a municipality in Surendranagar district in the Indian state of Gujarat. Located on the banks of the Bhogavo River, around 3 km from Surendranagar and 111 km from Ahmedabad, Wadhwan is a known location for its old world royal charm and serene space with a life and culture of its own. It was historically the capital of Wadhwan State.

== Demographics ==
Flag of Wadhwan

As of 2001 India census, Wadhwan city had a population of 61,739. Males constitute 52% of the population and females 48%. Wadhwan city has an average literacy rate of 71%, higher than the national average of 59.5%: male literacy is 78%, and female literacy is 63%. In Wadhwan city, 12% of the population is under 6 years of age.

== Geography ==
It is located on the bank of the dry Bhogavo River.

== History ==
The name "Wadhwan" is said to derive from "Vardhmānpur", after Vardhamana, also known as Mahavira, the 24th Tirthankar of Jainism. According to legend, the site of Wadhwan was originally a place called "Astigram", or "the village of bones", due to the predations of a man-eating yaksha named Shulpani, who lived in a cave on the bank of the Bhogavo river half a mile east of the present town. However, Mahavira visited the town and converted Shulpani, and the relieved inhabitants renamed the town Vardhmanpur in his honor. A temple dedicated to Mahavira now stands on the site said to have been Shulpani's home.

Another legendary account holds that, around 295 CE, Wadhwan was ruled by the Vala dynasty king Ebhal, remembered in oral tradition for defeating an Irani force of 200,000 men.

A copper-plate inscription dated to samvat 639 (717 CE) records Wadhwan (as Vardhmanpur) as being ruled by a Raja Dharnivaraha of the Chapa dynasty; Dharnivaraha is described as subservient to one Mahipal Dev, whose identity is uncertain. Dharnivaraha's ancestry is also given: he appears to have succeeded his brother Dhruvabhta as king; their father was Pulkeshi, who was the grandson of Vikramark, founder of the dynasty, via Vikramark's son Adraka.

The later Solanki dynasty of Patan made Wadhwan a fortified post on their military highway from Viramgam to Junagadh and Somnath; Wadhwan lay between Jhinjhuvada and Sayla on this road. Later still, Wadhwan was the seat of a branch of the Vaghela dynasty; after that, it came under Muslim rule. From the time of Ahmad Shah I of the Gujarat Sultanate, Wadhwan was the site of a strongly fortified thana to secure control over the region. The city's Pada mosque was constructed during this period; a Persian inscription formerly in the mosque (but later kept in the Darbar enclosure which was later converted into a granary) dated to 1439 CE records it as having been built by one Malik Muhammad b. Malik Musa during the reign of Ahmad Shah. Another inscription, this one in Old Gujarati and dated to samvat 1613 (1556 CE, during the reign of Ahmad Shah II), records the local Kotia and Talavia Kolis as being landholding pasaitas responsible for the maintenance of the forts (kot) and water tanks (talavi) near their lands.

=== Wadhwan State ===
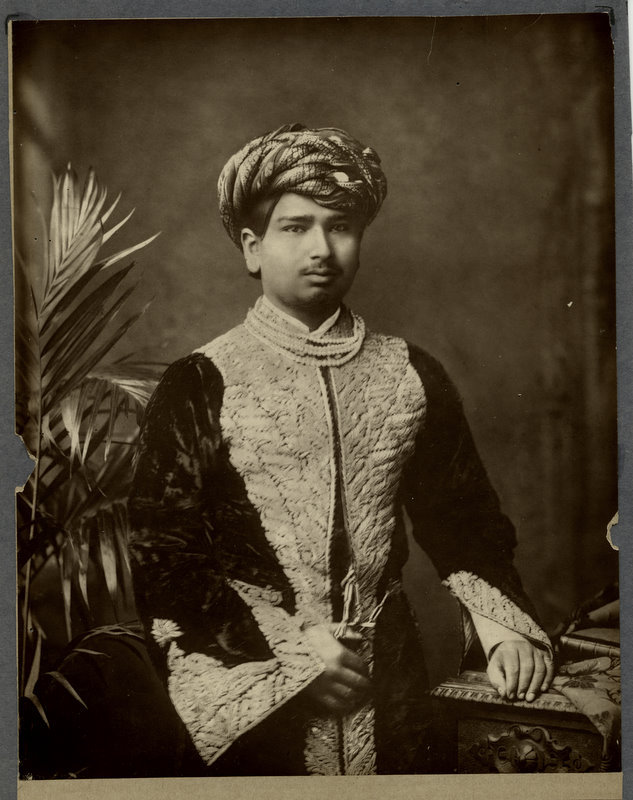
The Thakore of Wadhwan

During the British Raj, Wadhwan State was one of several princely states governed by the Jhala Rajputs. It was classified as a 9-gun salute state.

Vadhwan rulers belonged to the Jhala Rajput clans and had good administrative and culturally inclined society. To provide sufficient protection to their clan and the people, the town of Vadhwan was fortified and gates were erected at most places to provide safety. Some of these gates and the fortified walls are still found in the city, although city has grown beyond these walls. Vadhwan was the centre of the princely state by the same name, which in earlier days was known as Vardhamanpuri, the name being derived from the great Jain Thirthankaras, Bhagwan Vardhaman. The prime ministers of this princely state belonged to the Rawal family who were given the title of Dewan Bahadur. Under their rule, a number of important structures were constructed, mostly during the era of 18th and 19th century. Vadhwan is considered as an important centre for Jains and is renowned as one of the fortified towns of Gujarat. Formerly known as Vardhamanpuri, the town is believed to have footprints of Lord Mahavir. The Raj Mahal and Hawa Mahal were constructed here by the erstwhile rulers of the region.

The Raj Mahal was the residence of His Highness Balsinhji in the 19th century, replete with exotic gardens, cricket pitches, fountains, tennis courts and lily ponds. The Raj Mahal is now functioning as a heritage hotel.

Several members of the Thakar family served as Dewans (Prime Ministers) of the princely state, most prominent amongst them being Vishwanath Thakar and Khodidas Thakar in the 19th century.

=== Historical buildings ===
Hawa Mahal, "the wind palace," was built during the era of Jhala rulers. Even though it was an ambitious project with ultimate craftsmanship, the work was left incomplete. The part which is incomplete is outside the actual fort and is in different stages of construction along with the study of architectural designs, which were stopped midway. These give a glimpse into the style of architecture used by the artisans in erecting Hawa Mahal. In the present day also, many of the Sompura artisans whose community built Hawa mahal are seen involved in carvings and cutting of sculptures for various Hindu and Jain temple projects. Sompura Salat community was one of the Brahmin communities in Gujarat who were master artisans. They built famous Somnath Temple. In recent years, these artisans have been called upon for restoration work of various temples in Gujarat as well as in other parts of India, and also building new temples.

Vadwala Temple here is some 450 years old.

11th century Gangva Kund at Dedadara village is believed to have been constructed during the Chalukya period.

The popular ancient Gangavav step-well is believed to have been constructed in Vikram Samvat in 1969. There is Lakhavav also.

Madhavav is popular stepwell for its historical significance. It is believed that the son and daughter-in-law of King Sarang Dev sacrificed their lives here for the natives of the region. The Automobile Library, Wagheshwari Devi Temple and Swami Narayan Temple are some of the prominent attractions located in the vicinity of Wadhwan.

== Education ==
C. U. Shah University is a private university located in Wadhwan. It is run by Vardhman Bharti Trust and named after Chimanlal Ujamshibhai Shah. It had been created by the state of Gujarat under the Private University Amendment Bill in 2013. Other schools include Dajiraj High School, established in 1885, and Ladkibai Kanya Vidhyalaya, established in 1921.
