= Limbdi =

- Taluka
- Location in Gujarat, India Limbdi (India)
- Coordinates: 22°34′06.5″N 71°47′41.8″E
- Country: India
- State: Gujarat
- District: Surendranagar
- Elevation: 53 m (174 ft)

Population (2011)
  - Total: 42,769

Languages
  - Official: Gujarati, Hindi
- Time zone: UTC+5:30 (IST)
- PIN: 363421
- Vehicle registration: GJ 13
- Website: gujaratindia.com

Limbdi is a taluka in Surendranagar district in the Indian state of Gujarat.

== History ==
The area formed a part of the 9-gun salute state during the British Raj, when it was governed by members of a Jhala dynasty.

=== Limbdi Satyagrah ===
During the Satyagraha, the people of Limbdi formed a "Praja Mandal" on 24 December 1938, which caused friction between the king and the people of Limbdi. In 1939, a conference was held by "Praja Mandal", which the king did not like and he created a huge uproar at the conference. Many people were wounded during this incident. Many people felt disheartened and started migrating from Limbdi to other cities.

In 1940, after death of Sir Dolatsingh, Sir Digvijay became the ruler. He could rule for only four months, as he died shortly after his coronation. The last ruler of Limbdi was his son, Sir Chhatrapalsingh, from 1941 to 1948. After independence, Limbdi state was merged with Union of India.

== Education ==
Lady Wellingdon Girls School, now Municipal School number 3, was established in Limbdi on 1 March 1859, at a time when India had few girls' schools even in urban areas. It is now a co-educational school.

== Geography ==
Limbdi is located at 22.57°N 71.8°E. It has an average elevation of 53 metres (173 feet).

Limbdi is located on NH-8,101 km from Ahmedabad.

== Demographics ==
As of 2001 India census, Limbdi had a population of 40,067. Males constitute 52% of the population and females 48%. Limbdi has an average literacy rate of 70%, higher than the national average of 59.5%: male literacy is 78%, and female literacy is 62%. In Limbdi, 12% of the population is under 6 years of age.

== Points of Interest ==
- BAPS Swaminarayan mandir, Limbdi
- Raj Rajeshwar Dham (Tridev temple), Jakhan is located nearby, easterly. The temple complex is built on a hundred-acre piece of land, the initial acreage donated by the people (Lalubha Madarsinh zala, Andubha zala, Jitubha zala) of Jakhan Village. This place is the headquarters of Life mission society which has a global network. The centre offers many facilities.
- Ramakrishna Mission, Limbdi
- Shree Kabir Ashram, Limbdi, and Kabir temple, located little far from the ashram
- Shri Jagdish Ashram, Limbdi [of Jagannath tirtha swamiji]
- The film Guide's climax was shot in the town of Limbdi, 90 km from Ahmedabad on the Bhogavo River.
