= Surendranagar Dudhrej =

Surendranagar Jhalawad
- City
- Location in Gujarat, India Surendranagar (India)
- Coordinates: 22°43′31.445″N 71°38′11.799″E
- Country: India
- State: Gujarat
- District: Surendranagar

Government
  - Type: Municipal Corporation
  - Body: Surendranagar Municipal Corporation

Area
  - Total: 124.97 km^{2} (48.25 sq mi)
- Elevation: 98 m (322 ft)

Population (2011)
  - Total: 177,851
  - Density: 1,423.1/km^{2} (3,685.9/sq mi)

Languages
  - Official: Gujarati, Hindi
- Time zone: UTC+5:30 (IST)
- PIN: 3630xx
- Telephone code: 02752
- Vehicle registration: GJ-13
- Climate: Semi-arid (Köppen)
- Website: https://snmcgujarat.com/

Surendranagar is Municipal Corporation in Surendranagar district in the Indian state of Gujarat.

== Climate ==
Surendranagar Dudhrej, in common with most of Gujarat, has a hot semi-arid climate (Köppen BSh) with three seasons. The hot season lasts from March to May and is sweltering but dry and almost rainless, before giving way to the monsoon from June to September which is hot and humid with extremely erratic and short-lived but very intense rainfall. The cool season from October to February is rainless with pleasant mornings and very warm to hot afternoons with low humidity making for more comfortable conditions.

Climate data for Surendranagar (1991–2020)
Month	Jan	Feb	Mar	Apr	May	Jun	Jul	Aug	Sep	Oct	Nov	Dec	Year
Record high °C (°F)	35.0 (95.0)	39.0 (102.2)	43.3 (109.9)	45.7 (114.3)	47.8 (118.0)	45.8 (114.4)	40.7 (105.3)	37.6 (99.7)	41.0 (105.8)	40.7 (105.3)	38.5 (101.3)	36.3 (97.3)	47.8 (118.0)
Mean daily maximum °C (°F)	28.3 (82.9)	31.8 (89.2)	36.2 (97.2)	40.3 (104.5)	42.2 (108.0)	39.4 (102.9)	34.4 (93.9)	32.5 (90.5)	33.6 (92.5)	33.6 (92.5)	34.0 (93.2)	29.9 (85.8)	35.0 (95.0)
Mean daily minimum °C (°F)	13.2 (55.8)	16.1 (61.0)	20.6 (69.1)	24.7 (76.5)	27.0 (80.6)	28.0 (82.4)	26.8 (80.2)	25.8 (78.4)	25.1 (77.2)	24.0 (75.2)	19.4 (66.9)	14.9 (58.8)	22.2 (72.0)
Record low °C (°F)	5.7 (42.3)	5.2 (41.4)	11.9 (53.4)	13.8 (56.8)	15.2 (59.4)	21.8 (71.2)	21.7 (71.1)	21.6 (70.9)	21.7 (71.1)	16.1 (61.0)	11.1 (52.0)	5.0 (41.0)	5.0 (41.0)
Average rainfall mm (inches)	0.2 (0.01)	0.0 (0.0)	0.9 (0.04)	2.2 (0.09)	0.2 (0.01)	70.4 (2.77)	196.8 (7.75)	160.7 (6.33)	139.4 (5.49)	21.0 (0.83)	2.1 (0.08)	0.7 (0.03)	594.7 (23.41)
Average rainy days	0.0	0.0	0.1	0.3	0.0	4.0	7.1	7.5	6.1	1.2	0.2	0.2	26.7
Average relative humidity (%) (at 17:30 IST)	34	28	22	21	23	44	64	68	63	42	40	37	40
Source: India Meteorological Department

== Etymology ==
Dudhrej was originally a nes (hamlet) settled by the Charanas. One Shastam Swami wanted a temple to be built on the bank of the tank, so he started a shrine. The Charan ladies of the village would pour milk (dudh) over a particular place at the shrine due to which the place began to be known as Dudhrej.

== Demographics ==
As of 2001 India census, Dudhrej had a population of 156,417. Males constitute 52% of the population and females 48%. Dudhrej has an average literacy rate of 71%, higher than the national average of 59.5%: male literacy is 77%, and female literacy is 64%. In Dudhrej, 12% of the population is under 6 years of age.

== Religious importance ==
Vadwala Mandir of Rabari community and Mandavrayji Dada Mandir of Rajput community is situated here.

Shri Vadwala Mandir Dudharejdham is located in Wadhwan taluka of Surendranagar district, five kilometers north of Surendranagar village, on the road to Dhrangadhra in the north. In Dudhrej village, in the tradition of Acharya, with the inspiration of the 31st disciple Shri Nilkanthaswamy and with the auspicious blessings Shri Vaishnu's Shri Vatapati (Vadvala Dev) Bhagwan is located. His deity is Ayodhyapati Lord Shri Ramchandraji and he is known as Shri Vatapati or Vadwala all over Gujarat as well as outside Gujarat.

The Surendranagar Trimandir is located 17.1 km away from the city of Surendranagar (Gujarat), near Lok Vidhyalaya, on Muli Road.
