= Surendranagar district =

- District of Gujarat
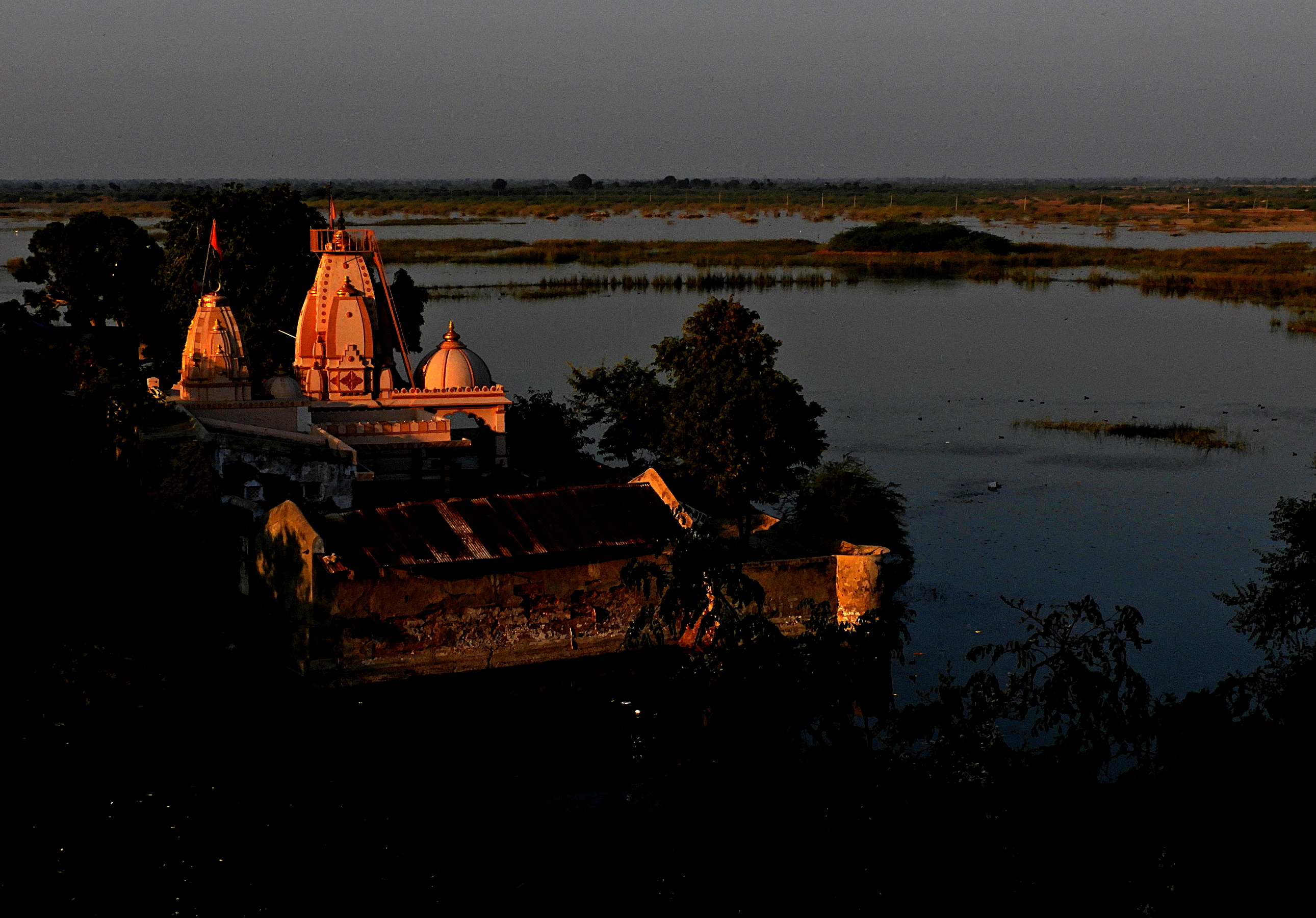
- clockwise from top left: Chamunda Devi Temple, Chotila; Halvad palace, Man Mehalat Palace; Shakti Mata temple, Patdi

- Location of district in Gujarat
- Coordinates: 22°44′N 71°31′E
- Country: India
- State: Gujarat
- Region: Saurashtra
- Headquarters: Surendranagar

Area
  - Total: 10,489 km^{2} (4,050 sq mi)
- Elevation: 547 m (1,795 ft)

Population (2011)
  - Total: 1,585,268
  - Density: 151.14/km^{2} (391.44/sq mi)

Languages
  - Official: Gujarati, Hindi
- Time zone: UTC+5:30 (IST)
- PIN: 363001
- Telephone code: 02752
- Vehicle registration: GJ 13
- Sex ratio: 0.924 ♀/♂
- Literacy: 72.13%census of 2011
- Website: surendranagar.nic.in

Surendranagar district is an administrative district in Saurashtra region of Gujarat state in India. It has a population of approximately 1.7 million people. Surendranagar, along with the twin city of Wadhwan, has a total of 400,000 inhabitants, and is known as "Camp". The district headquarters is Surendranagar.

== Etymology ==
Surendranagar district takes its name from its headquarters Surendranagar. Originally it was the place where the British political agent for Wadhwan lived and became known as Wadhwan Camp. After the agent left in 1946, Wadhwan Camp was renamed after Surendrasinhji Jorawarsinhji (1922–1983), then-ruler of Wadhwan, and became known as Surendranagar. Even today the city is still called the 'Camp' locally from its old name.

The district overall, when the various princely states had been merged, was known as 'Jhalavad', the land of the Jhala Rajputs, who held many of the states. Their name derives from an apocryphal incident in the palace of Harpaldev, their ancestor. A wild elephant had burst into a courtyard where his children were playing, but their mother managed to fend off the elephant and rescue the children. As she held them, they received the name 'Jhala'from the Gujarati word Jhalavun (to hold).

== History ==
Several small-scale archaeological expeditions in the district have found only a few traces of prehistoric man. Tools from the Late Stone Age were found in Sejakpur in Sayla taluk in 1957–58. Near Rangpur in 1931 was found a Harappan site, the first Harappan site found in Gujarat and evidence that the Indus Valley civilization extended to Saurasthra. In fact, Rangpur was the first site found that lasted longer than the Harappan civilization itself. However, it seems Rangpur was not a major commercial centre since no seals were found here.

The early history of this district is unclear, but most likely follows the same pattern as the other districts of Saurashtra. The district was probably ruled by the Mauryas, then Indo-Greeks. Afterwards it was ruled by the Western Satraps, and then by the Gurjara-Pratiharas. Eventually the Chaulukyas took over, and after they were destroyed by the Delhi Sultanate, it became part of their empire. In 1407, the governors of Gujarat declared their independence, and Surendranagar became part of the Gujarat Sultanate. After 1573, Gujarat was annexed into the Mughal Empire and Surendranagar became part of the Gujarat Subah. However, on the group control of the district rested with numerous kings and landlords with estates of various sizes, and this continued until the British period.

There were several states in the district during the British period: states such as Dhrangadhra, Wadhwan, and Limbdi were ruled by the jhala Rajputs, formerly known as Makwanas. They claim descent from Harpaldev, son of Kesar Makwana whose wife was daughter of celebrated Chaulukya ruler Karandev solanki. Harpaldev received 1800 villages from Karandev solanki for his valour.

The state of Bajana was founded by Malik Haider Khan, a Jat leader driven out of Sindh who was given land by the Gujarat sultans. Dasada was ruled by Multani Maliks descended from a Thanedar during the reign of Ahmad Shah I.

Dhandhalapur was ruled first by the Babarias, but in 1790 they were displaced by the Khadvads. Lakhtar was founded when a son of the Raja of Halvad received the village from the chief of Dhrangadhra. The rulers of Limbdi claimed descent from Harpaldev.

Thangadh was originally ruled by the Babariyas. They were ousted by the Parmars, who migrated from Tharparkar and were given land by the Vaghelas of Wadhwan. After the Parmars came the Kathis, who made Than their headquarters. However Kartalab Khan, governor of Gujarat, dispersed the Kathis and destroyed their Surya temple. Than remained in Muslim hands until the fading of Mughal power, when the jhala of Halvad took it over.

== Economy ==
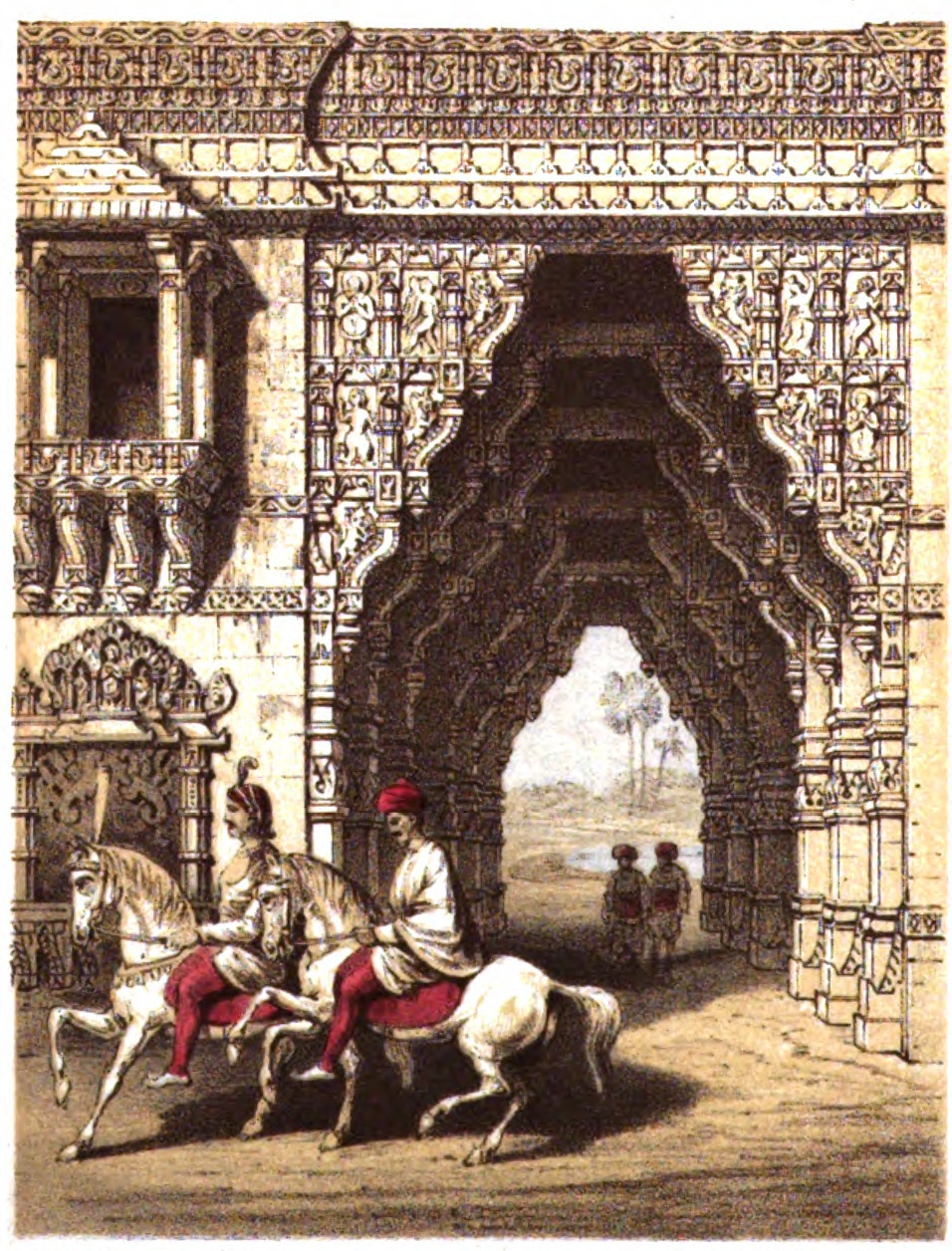
Gate at Zinzuwada, Gujarat, India

In the past, Surendranagar was used by colonialists as a hill station, because of its dry environment that was believed in contemporary medicine to be beneficial for some physical as well as mental ailments. Surendranagar's dry air is still believed to be the best place in Gujarat to cure tuberculosis patients.

District capital Surendranagar, which lies under Municipality body is suffering from poor condition of roads and the two Causeways which join both the sides of city divided by Bhogavo River. Municipality body of city is considered to be a candidate for status of Municipal Corporation for a long time but due to some political reasons it never happen. It has the second highest number of educational institutes per capita. Many newspapers are published from Surendranagar in Gujarat.

=== Businesses ===
Many small and medium enterprises and industries are present, including confectionery, ceramics, pharmaceuticals, engineering plastics, bearings and salt production. Wadhwan City is a major trade and processing centre for agricultural products, cotton, salt, pharmaceuticals, chemicals and plastics, textile bearings, ceramics, and sanitary ware.

=== Natural resources ===
Nearly 25 percent of India's salt supply comes from mining in the Surendranagar area. There are miles of Agar (Salt pans), especially in the Kharaghoda area. High-quality salt is produced in Zinzuwada, a desert area.

=== Textiles ===
Surendranagar is a hub of cotton and ginning activities in India, with a large number of ginning and pressing units. It is one of the largest producers of quality Shankar cotton in world. The Surendranagar Cotton Oil and Oilseeds Association Ltd., (Government of India recognised) is a world-famous futures trading exchange for cotton. It was established in 1964 and is the first Cotton Future Trading Exchange in India.

Surendranagar City is also home to a big textile and clothing market, specialising in saris. Large clothing showrooms are located in the city on Jawahar Road and Vithal Press Road.

== Demographics ==
According to the 2011 census Surendranagar district has a population of 1,756,268, with 909,917 males and 846,351 females roughly equal to the nation of The Gambia or the US state of Nebraska. This gives it a ranking of 274th in India (out of a total of 640). Its population growth rate over the decade 2001–2011 was 15.89%. Surendranagar has a sex ratio of 929 females for every 1000 males, and a literacy rate of 73.19%.

The divided district had a population of 1,585,268, of which 464,892 (29.33%) lived in urban areas. The divided district had a sex ratio of 929 females per 1000 males. Scheduled Castes and Scheduled Tribes made up 168,183 (10.61%) and 21,151 (1.33%) of the population respectively.

Religions in Surendranagar district (2011)
Religion	Percent
Hinduism	91.78%
Islam	6.59%
Jains	1.43%
Other or not stated	0.20%

Hindus are 1,455,009 (91.78%) while Muslims are 104,495 (6.59%) and Jains 22,679 (1.43%).

=== Language ===
Languages of Surendranagar district (2011)
1. Gujarati (98.8%)
2. Others (1.23%)

At the time of the 2011 Census of India, Gujarati was the predominant language, spoken by 98.77% of the population.

== Politics ==
District	No.	Constituency	Name	Party	Remarks
Surendranagar	60	Dasada (SC)	P. K. Parmar		
Surendranagar	61	Limdi	Kiritsinh Rana		
Surendranagar	62	Wadhwan	Jagdish Makwana		
Surendranagar	63	Chotila	Shamji Chauhan		
Surendranagar	64	Dhangadhra	Prakash Varmora		

== Culture ==
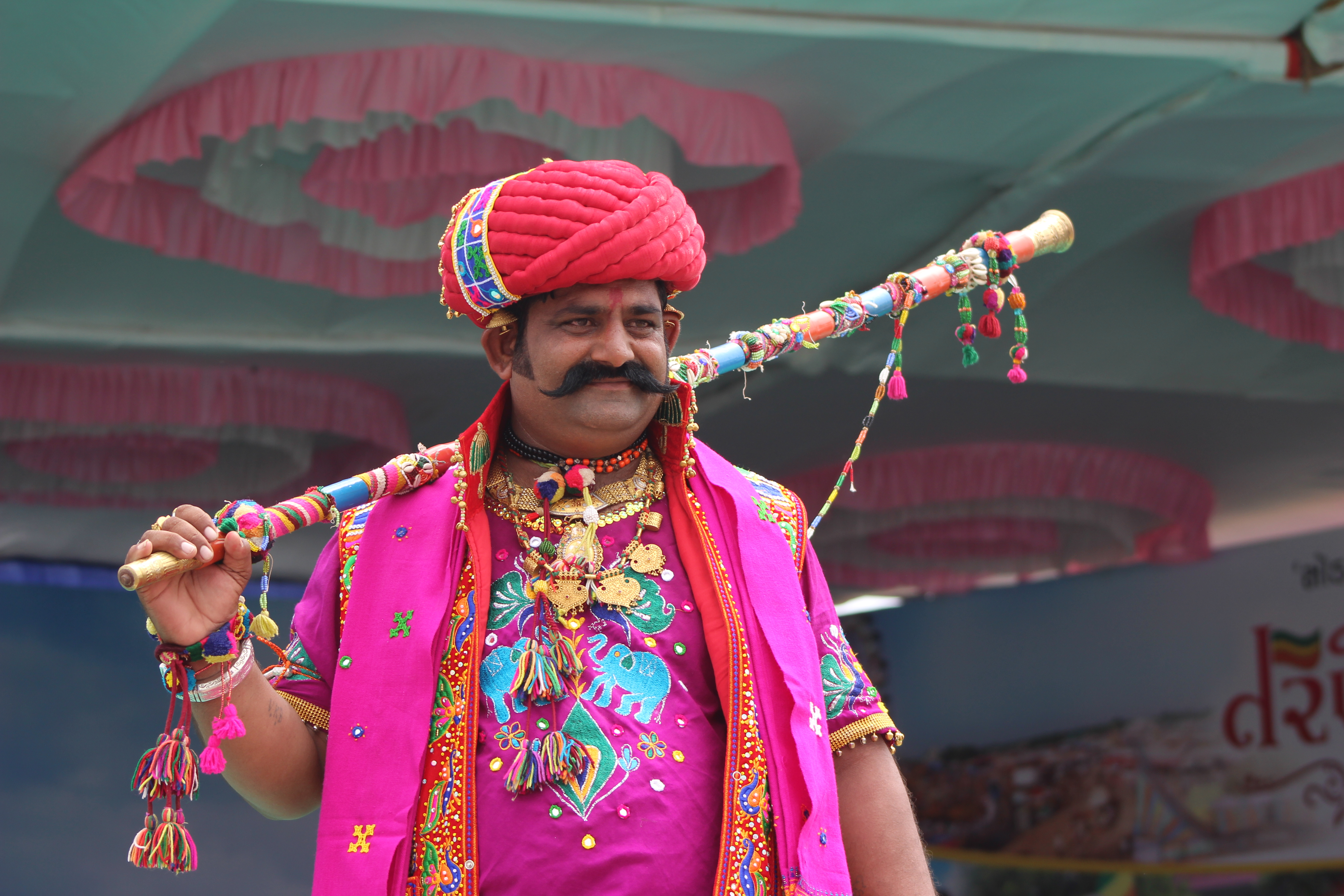
A man in traditional costumes during Tarnetar fair.

Raj-Rajeshwari Temple, on National Highway Number 8 near Limbdi, is a large area of residences, hospitals, and schools. The temple features an exhibition of yoga performed by Rishiji. This temple has temples to three major gods—Brahma, Vishnu, and Mahesh—inside. It is the only such temple in Gujarat. The temple is noted for its architecture.

Trimandir - A very big temple known as the ‘Trimandir’ by Param Pujya Dada Bhagwan houses Lord Simandhar Swami, Shiv Swaroop, Krishna Bhagwan, other celestial deities.

The famous kund known as "Gangavo" is located in Dedadara village. It was built in the 11th century.

Main Jain Temple, which is in the heart of the city, of Sri Vasupujyaswami Bhahvan is more than 100 years old.

=== Legends ===
==== Ranakadevi ====
According to legend, during the siege of Junagadh, Jayasimha Siddharaja fell in love with the queen of Khengara, Ranakdevi. He attacked Junagadh and killed Ra'Khengar to claim the fort and the queen, but she refused and fled. She escaped from the city towards the River Bhogaavo. After a long chase, she gave up and instead of becoming the queen of Junagadh she sacrificed her life by forming sati on the banks of Bhogavo River, near the city of Wadhwan. However, before she died she cursed that the river would not flow beyond that spot. There is a temple in honour of Ranakdevi on the banks of the river.

== Notable people ==
- Anil Chavda, a Gujarati poet, was born here.
- Dalpatram (1820–1898), a Gujarati language poet was born in Wadhwan city of Surendranagar district.
- Jhaverchand Meghani (1896–1947), poet, litterateur, social reformer and freedom fighter. Born in Chotila.
- Shahabuddin Rathod, a Gujarati comedian, hails from this district.
- Vipul K. Rawal, a Hindi film writer was born in Surendranagar.
- Sukhlal Sanghvi (1880–1978), Jain scholar and philosopher. Born in Limbdi.

== See also ==
- Surendranagar city
- Surendranagar (Lok Sabha constituency)
