= List of National Democratic Alliance candidates in the 2019 Indian general election =

National Democratic Alliance (NDA) is an Indian political party coalition led by Bharatiya Janata Party (BJP). Following is the Lok Sabha constituencies-wise list of the National Democratic Alliance candidates for the 2019 Indian general election.

BJP is one of the two major political parties in India; the other being the Indian National Congress. BJP has formed pre-poll alliance with various parties and independent candidates to constitute the National Democratic Alliance. Of the 29 states and 7 union territories, BJP will be having alliance in 11 states (Assam, Bihar, Jharkhand, Karnataka, Kerala, Maharashtra Nagaland, Punjab, Rajasthan, Tamil Nadu and Uttar Pradesh) and 1 union territory (Puducherry) with regional political parties.

Together, NDA will be contesting for all 543 constituency seats that will form the 17th Lok Sabha. BJP will form the highest share of NDA by contesting in 437 constituencies; followed by other large parties like, AIADMK (20), JDU (17) and Shiromani Akali Dal (10)

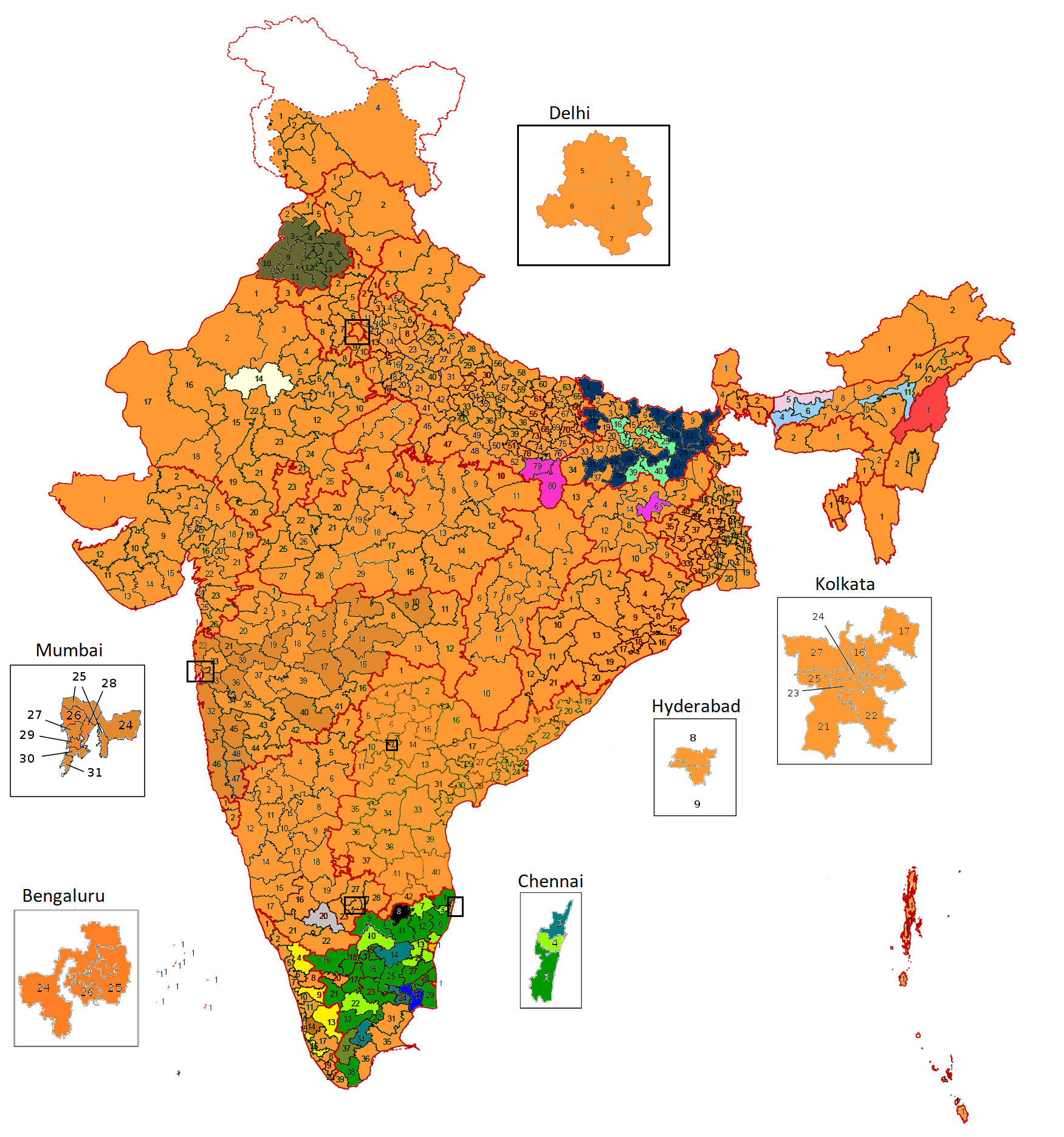
Seat-sharing arrangement of the BJP-led NDA for the 2019 Indian general election.: Bharatiya Janata Party; Shiv Sena; All India Anna Dravida Munnetra Kazhagam; Janata Dal (United); Shiromani Akali Dal; Pattali Makkal Katchi; Lok Janshakti Party; Bharath Dharma Jana Sena; Desiya Murpokku Dravida Kazhagam; Asom Gana Parishad; Apna Dal (Sonelal); All Jharkhand Students Union; Puthiya Tamilagam; Tamil Maanila Congress; Puthiya Needhi Katchi; All India N.R. Congress; Bodoland People's Front; Nationalist Democratic Progressive Party; Kerala Congress (Thomas); Rashtriya Loktantrik Party; Sumalatha (Independent candidate); None

== Seat Sharing Summary ==
Constituents of National Democratic Alliance (Pre-poll Alliance)
#	Party	Alliance in states	Seats contested	Seats won	Seats Loss	References
1	Bharatiya Janata Party	All States and UTs	437	303	134	
2	Shiv Sena	Maharashtra	23	18	5	
3	All India Anna Dravida Munnetra Kazhagam	Tamil Nadu	20	1	19	
4	Janata Dal (United)	Bihar	17	16	1	
5	Shiromani Akali Dal	Punjab	10	2	8	
6	Pattali Makkal Katchi	Tamil Nadu	7	0	7	
7	Lok Janshakti Party	Bihar	6	6	0	
8	Desiya Murpokku Dravida Kazhagam	Tamil Nadu	4	0	4	
9	Bharath Dharma Jana Sena	Kerala	4	0	4	
10	Asom Gana Parishad	Assam	3	0	3	
11	Apna Dal (Sonelal)	Uttar Pradesh	2	2	0	
12	Puthiya Tamilagam	Tamil Nadu	1	0	1	
13	Puthiya Needhi Katchi	Tamil Nadu	1	0	1	
14	Tamil Maanila Congress	Tamil Nadu	1	0	1	
15	All Jharkhand Students Union	Jharkhand	1	1	0	
16	Bodoland People's Front	Assam	1	0	1	
17	Nationalist Democratic Progressive Party	Nagaland	1	1	0	
18	Kerala Congress (Thomas)	Kerala	1	0	1	
19	Rashtriya Loktantrik Party	Rajasthan	1	1	0	
20	All India N.R. Congress	Pudhucherry	1	0	1	
21	Sumalatha (Independent candidate) supported by BJP	Karnataka	1	1	0	
Total			543	352	191	

== Andhra Pradesh ==
Andhra Pradesh NDA

BJP (25)

Constituency No.	Constituency	Reserved for (SC/ST/None)	Candidate	Party	Poll On	Result
1	Araku	ST	K. V. V. Satyanarayan Reddy	Bharatiya Janata Party	11 April 2019	Lost
2	Srikakulam	None	Perla Sambamurti	Bharatiya Janata Party	11 April 2019	Lost
3	Vizianagaram	None	P. Sanyasi Raju	Bharatiya Janata Party	11 April 2019	Lost
4	Visakhapatnam	None	Daggubati Purandeswari	Bharatiya Janata Party	11 April 2019	Lost
5	Anakapalli	None	Gandi Venkata Satyanarayana	Bharatiya Janata Party	11 April 2019	Lost
6	Kakinada	None	Yalla Venkata Ramamohana Rao	Bharatiya Janata Party	11 April 2019	Lost
7	Amalapuram	SC	Ayyaji Vema Manepalli	Bharatiya Janata Party	11 April 2019	Lost
8	Rajahmundry	None	Satya Gopinath Dasparavasthu	Bharatiya Janata Party	11 April 2019	Lost
9	Narasapuram	None	Pydikondala Manikyala Rao	Bharatiya Janata Party	11 April 2019	Lost
10	Eluru	None	Chinnam Ramkotaya	Bharatiya Janata Party	11 April 2019	Lost
11	Machilipatnam	None	Gudivaka Ramanjaneyulu	Bharatiya Janata Party	11 April 2019	Lost
12	Vijayawada	None	Dilip Kumar Kilaru	Bharatiya Janata Party	11 April 2019	Lost
13	Guntur	None	Valluru Jayaprakash Narayana	Bharatiya Janata Party	11 April 2019	Lost
14	Narasaraopet	None	Kanna Lakshminarayana	Bharatiya Janata Party	11 April 2019	Lost
15	Bapatla	SC	Challagali Kishore Kumar	Bharatiya Janata Party	11 April 2019	Lost
16	Ongole	None	Thogunta Srinivas	Bharatiya Janata Party	11 April 2019	Lost
17	Nandyal	None	Adinarayana Inti	Bharatiya Janata Party	11 April 2019	Lost
18	Kurnool	None	P. V. Parthasarathi	Bharatiya Janata Party	11 April 2019	Lost
19	Anantapur	None	Hamsa Devineni	Bharatiya Janata Party	11 April 2019	Lost
20	Hindupur	None	Pogala Venkata Parthasarathi	Bharatiya Janata Party	11 April 2019	Lost
21	Kadapa	None	Singareddy Ramchandra Reddy	Bharatiya Janata Party	11 April 2019	Lost
22	Nellore	None	Sannapareddy Suresh Reddy	Bharatiya Janata Party	11 April 2019	Lost
23	Tirupati	SC	Bommi Srihari Rao	Bharatiya Janata Party	11 April 2019	Lost
24	Rajampet	None	Pappireddi Maheswara Reddy	Bharatiya Janata Party	11 April 2019	Lost
25	Chittoor	SC	Jayaram Duggani	Bharatiya Janata Party	11 April 2019	Lost

== Arunachal Pradesh ==
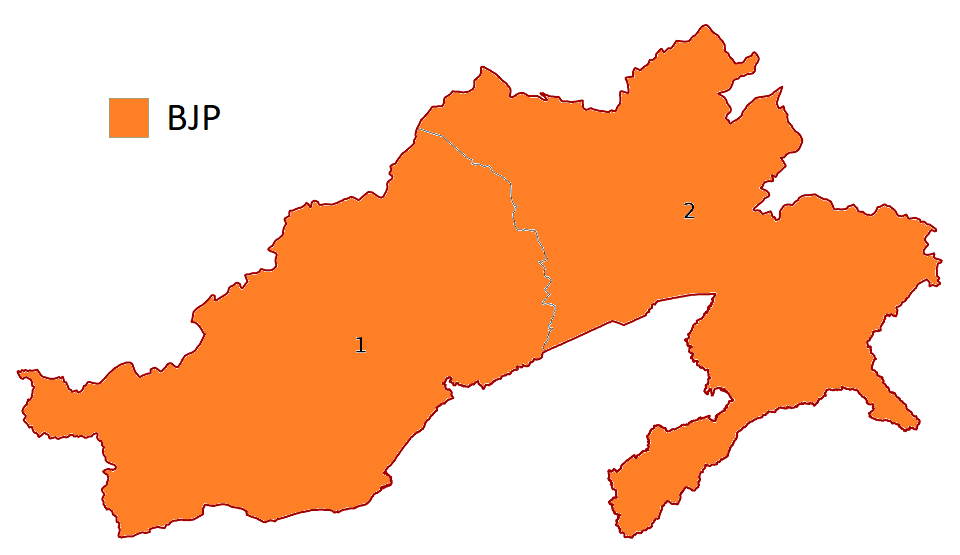
Arunachal Pradesh NDA

BJP (2)

Constituency No.	Constituency	Reserved for (SC/ST/None)	Candidate	Party	Poll On	Result
1	Arunachal West	None	Kiren Rijiju	Bharatiya Janata Party	11 April 2019	Won
2	Arunachal East	None	Tapir Gao	Bharatiya Janata Party	11 April 2019	Won

== Assam ==
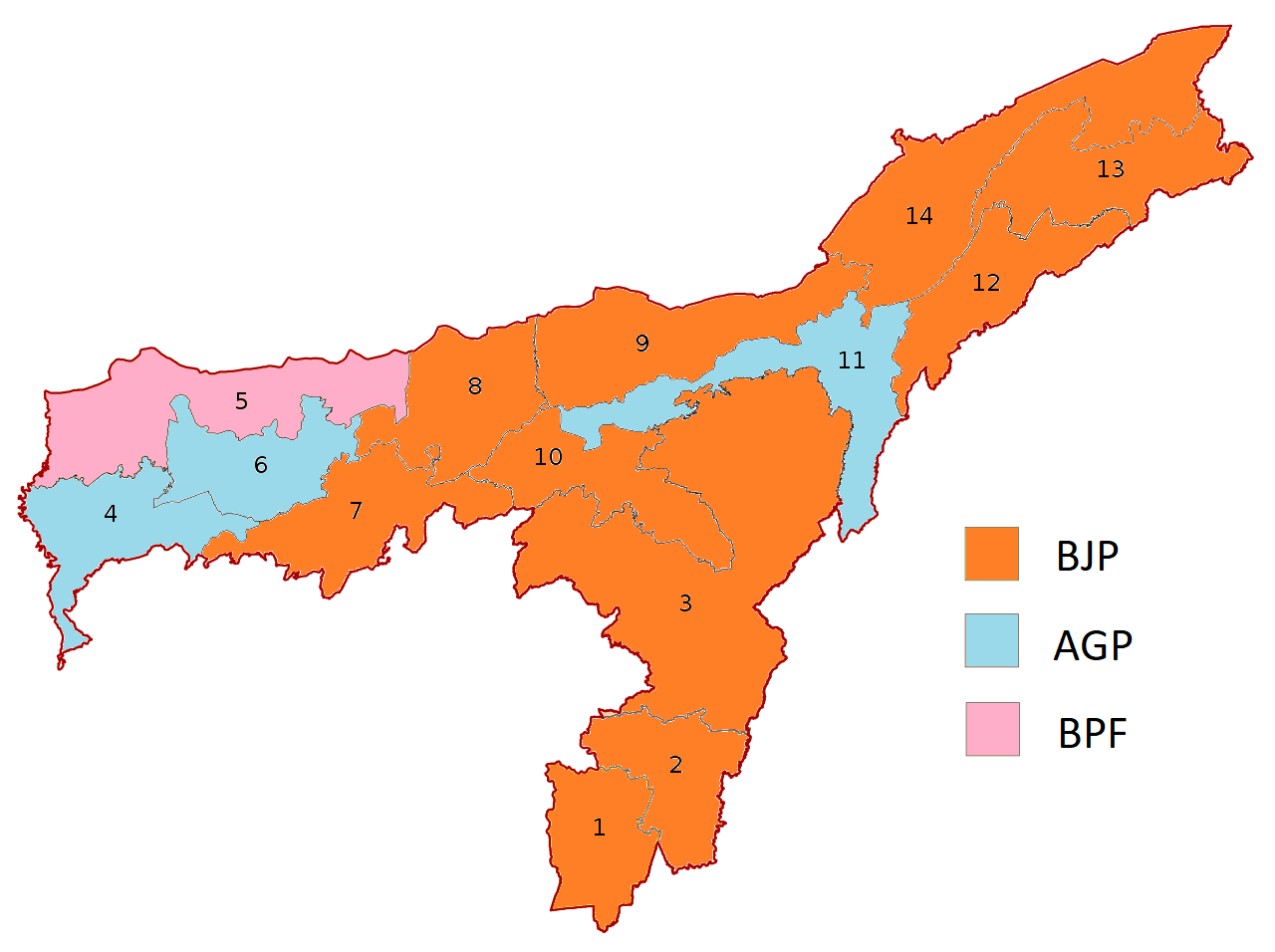
Assam NDA

BJP (10) AGP (3) BPF (1)

Constituency No.	Constituency	Reserved for (SC/ST/None)	Candidate	Party	Poll On	Result
1	Karimganj	SC	Kripanath Mallah	Bharatiya Janata Party	18 April 2019	Won
2	Silchar	None	Rajdeep Roy	Bharatiya Janata Party	18 April 2019	Won
3	Autonomous District	ST	Horen Sing Bey	Bharatiya Janata Party	18 April 2019	Won
4	Dhubri	None	Zabed Islam	Asom Gana Parishad	23 April 2019	Lost
5	Kokrajhar	ST	Pramila Rani Brahma	Bodoland People's Front	23 April 2019	Lost
6	Barpeta	None	Kumar Deepak Das	Asom Gana Parishad	23 April 2019	Lost
7	Gauhati	None	Queen Oja	Bharatiya Janata Party	23 April 2019	Won
8	Mangaldoi	None	Dilip Saikia	Bharatiya Janata Party	18 April 2019	Won
9	Tezpur	None	Pallab Lochan Das	Bharatiya Janata Party	11 April 2019	Won
10	Nowgong	None	Rupak Sharma	Bharatiya Janata Party	18 April 2019	Lost
11	Kaliabor	None	Mani Madhav Mahanta	Asom Gana Parishad	11 April 2019	Lost
12	Jorhat	None	Topon Kumar Gogoi	Bharatiya Janata Party	11 April 2019	Won
13	Dibrugarh	None	Rameswar Teli	Bharatiya Janata Party	11 April 2019	Won
14	Lakhimpur	None	Pradan Baruah	Bharatiya Janata Party	11 April 2019	Won

== Bihar ==
BJP (17) JD(U) (17) LJP (6)

Constituency No.	Constituency	Reserved for (SC/ST/None)	Candidate	Party	Poll On	Result
1	Valmiki Nagar	None	Baidyanath Prasad Mahto	Janata Dal (United)	12 May 2019	Won
2	Paschim Champaran	None	Dr. Sanjay Jaiswal	Bharatiya Janata Party	12 May 2019	Won
3	Purvi Champaran	None	Radha Mohan Singh	Bharatiya Janata Party	12 May 2019	Won
4	Sheohar	None	Rama Devi	Bharatiya Janata Party	12 May 2019	Won
5	Sitamarhi	None	Sunil Kumar Pintu	Janata Dal (United)	6 May 2019	Won
6	Madhubani	None	Ashok Kumar Yadav	Bharatiya Janata Party	6 May 2019	Won
7	Jhanjharpur	None	Ramprit Mandal	Janata Dal (United)	23 April 2019	Won
8	Supaul	None	Dileshwar Kamait	Janata Dal (United)	23 April 2019	Won
9	Araria	None	Pradeep Kumar Singh	Bharatiya Janata Party	23 April 2019	Won
10	Kishanganj	None	Mahmood Ashraf	Janata Dal (United)	18 April 2019	Lost
11	Katihar	None	Dulal Chandra Goswami	Janata Dal (United)	18 April 2019	Won
12	Purnia	None	Santosh Kumar Kushwaha	Janata Dal (United)	18 April 2019	Won
13	Madhepura	None	Dinesh Chandra Yadav	Janata Dal (United)	23 April 2019	Won
14	Darbhanga	None	Gopal Jee Thakur	Bharatiya Janata Party	29 April 2019	Won
15	Muzaffarpur	None	Ajay Nishad	Bharatiya Janata Party	6 May 2019	Won
16	Vaishali	None	Veena Devi	Lok Janshakti Party	12 May 2019	Won
17	Gopalganj	SC	Dr. Alok Kumar Suman	Janata Dal (United)	12 May 2019	Won
18	Siwan	None	Kavita Singh	Janata Dal (United)	12 May 2019	Won
19	Maharajganj	None	Janardan Singh Sigriwal	Bharatiya Janata Party	12 May 2019	Won
20	Saran	None	Rajiv Pratap Rudy	Bharatiya Janata Party	6 May 2019	Won
21	Hajipur	SC	Pashupati Kumar Paras	Lok Janshakti Party	6 May 2019	Won
22	Ujiarpur	None	Nityanand Rai	Bharatiya Janata Party	29 April 2019	Won
23	Samastipur	None	Ram Chandra Paswan	Lok Janshakti Party	29 April 2019	Won
24	Begusarai	None	Giriraj Singh	Bharatiya Janata Party	29 April 2019	Won
25	Khagaria	None	Mehboob Ali Kaiser	Lok Janshakti Party	23 April 2019	Won
26	Bhagalpur	None	Ajay Kumar Mandal	Janata Dal (United)	18 April 2019	Won
27	Banka	None	Giridhari Yadav	Janata Dal (United)	18 April 2019	Won
28	Munger	None	Lalan Singh	Janata Dal (United)	29 April 2019	Won
29	Nalanda	None	Kaushalendra Kumar	Janata Dal (United)	19 May 2019	Won
30	Patna Sahib	None	Ravi Shankar Prasad	Bharatiya Janata Party	19 May 2019	Won
31	Pataliputra	None	Ram Kripal Yadav	Bharatiya Janata Party	19 May 2019	Won
32	Arrah	None	Raj Kumar Singh	Bharatiya Janata Party	19 May 2019	Won
33	Buxar	None	Ashwini Kumar Choubey	Bharatiya Janata Party	19 May 2019	Won
34	Sasaram	SC	Chhedi Paswan	Bharatiya Janata Party	19 May 2019	Won
35	Karakat	None	Mahabali Singh	Janata Dal (United)	19 May 2019	Won
36	Jahanabad	None	Chandeshwar Prasad	Janata Dal (United)	19 May 2019	Won
37	Aurangabad	None	Sushil Kumar Singh	Bharatiya Janata Party	11 April 2019	Won
38	Gaya	SC	Vijay Kumar Manjhi	Janata Dal (United)	11 April 2019	Won
39	Nawada	None	Chandan Kumar	Lok Janshakti Party	11 April 2019	Won
40	Jamui	SC	Chirag Paswan	Lok Janshakti Party	11 April 2019	Won

== Chhattisgarh ==
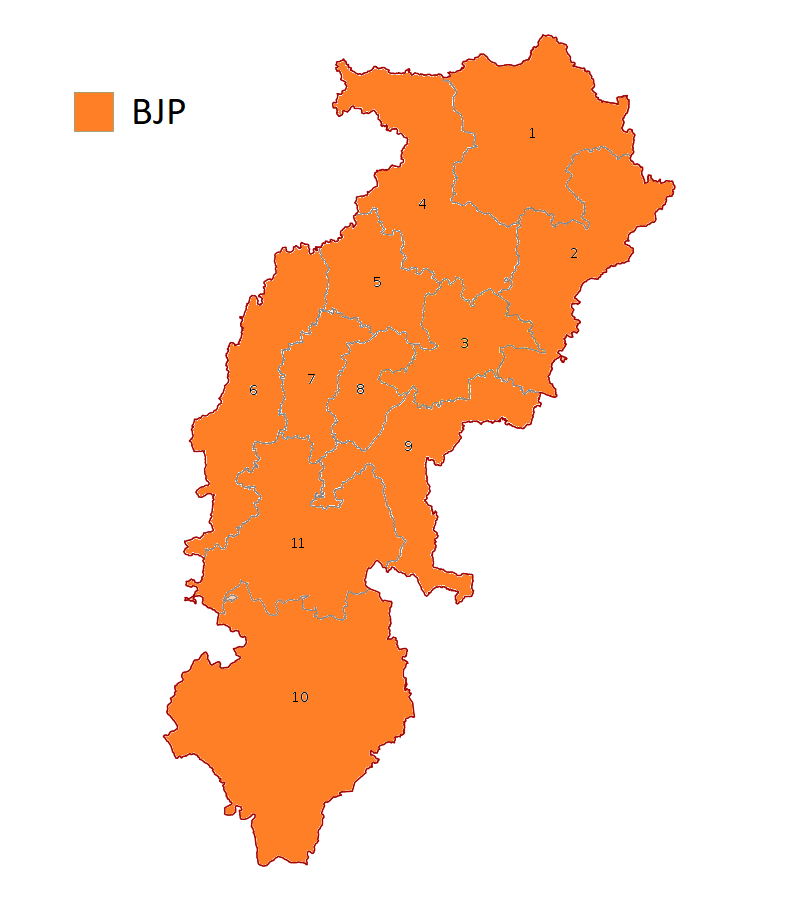
Chhattisgarh NDA

BJP (11)

Constituency No.	Constituency	Reserved for (SC/ST/None)	Candidate	Party	Poll On	Result
1	Sarguja	ST	Renuka Singh	Bharatiya Janata Party	23 April 2019	Won
2	Raigarh	ST	Gomtee Sai	Bharatiya Janata Party	23 April 2019	Won
3	Janjgir	SC	Guharam Ajgalle	Bharatiya Janata Party	23 April 2019	Won
4	Korba	None	Jyotinand Dubey	Bharatiya Janata Party	23 April 2019	Lost
5	Bilaspur	None	Arun Sao	Bharatiya Janata Party	23 April 2019	Won
6	Rajnandgaon	None	Santosh Pandey	Bharatiya Janata Party	18 April 2019	Won
7	Durg	None	Vijay Baghel	Bharatiya Janata Party	23 April 2019	Won
8	Raipur	None	Sunil Soni	Bharatiya Janata Party	23 April 2019	Won
9	Mahasamund	None	Chunnilal Sahu	Bharatiya Janata Party	18 April 2019	Won
10	Bastar	ST	Baiduram Kashyap	Bharatiya Janata Party	11 April 2019	Lost
11	Kanker	ST	Mohan Mandavi	Bharatiya Janata Party	18 April 2019	Won

== Goa ==
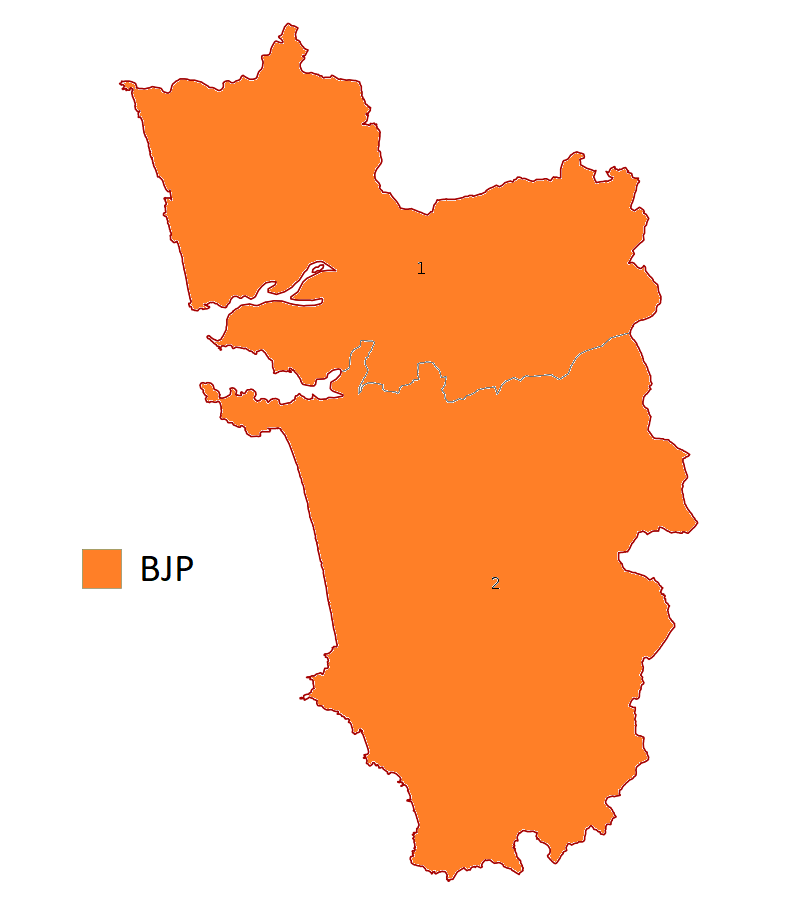
Goa NDA

BJP (2)

Constituency No.	Constituency	Reserved for (SC/ST/None)	Candidate	Party	Poll On	Result
1	North Goa	None	Shripad Naik	Bharatiya Janata Party	23 April 2019	Won
2	South Goa	None	Narendra Keshav Sawaikar	Bharatiya Janata Party	23 April 2019	Lost

== Gujarat ==
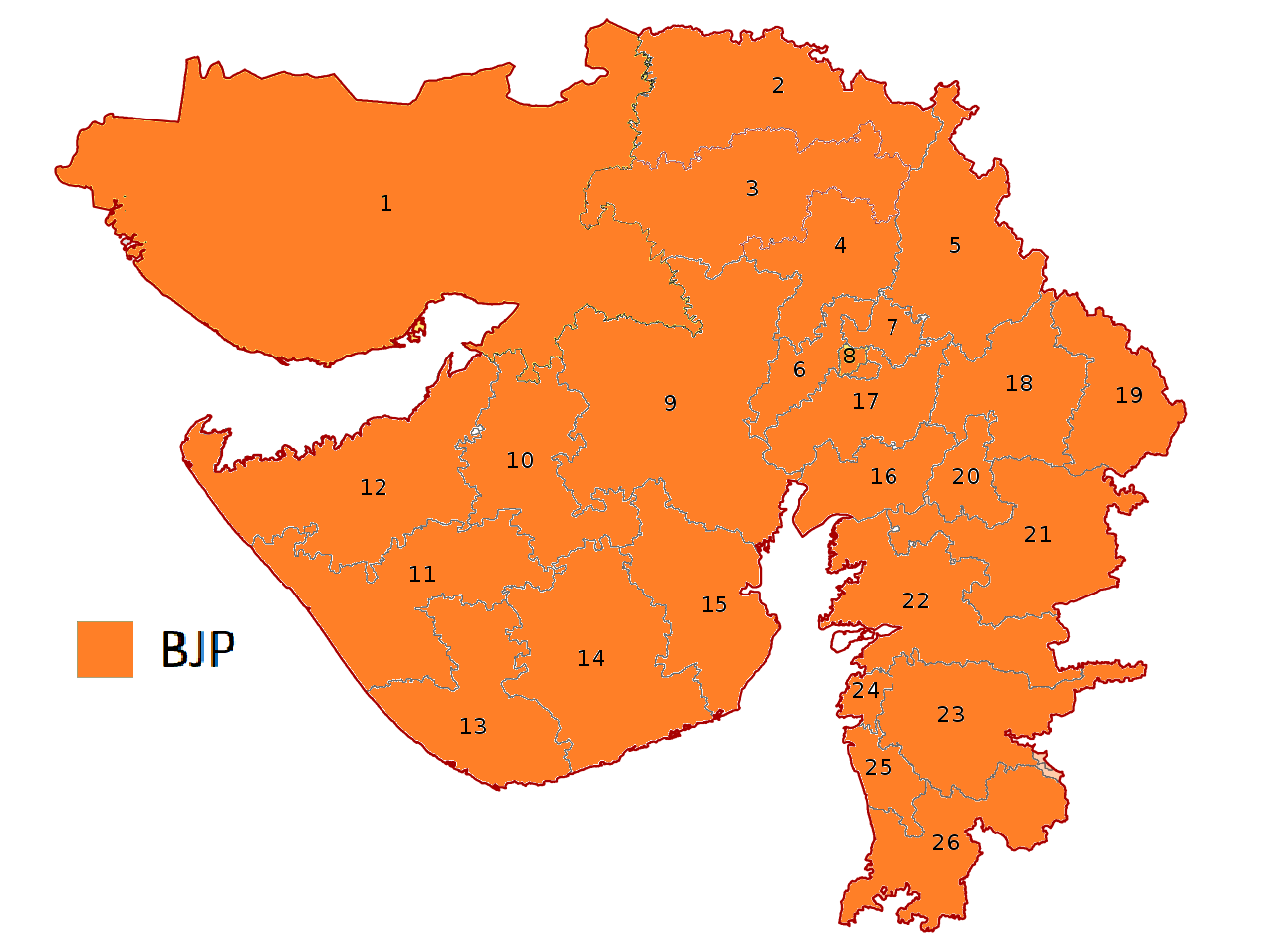
Gujarat NDA

BJP (26)

Constituency No.	Constituency	Reserved for (SC/ST/None)	Candidate	Party	Poll On	Result
1	Kachchh	SC	Vinodbhai Chavda	Bharatiya Janata Party	23 April 2019	Won
2	Banaskantha	None	Parbatbhai Patel	Bharatiya Janata Party	23 April 2019	Won
3	Patan	None	Bharatsinhji Dabhi Thakor	Bharatiya Janata Party	23 April 2019	Won
4	Mahesana	None	Shardaben Patel	Bharatiya Janata Party	23 April 2019	Won
5	Sabarkantha	None	Dipsinh Rathod	Bharatiya Janata Party	23 April 2019	Won
6	Gandhinagar	None	Amit Shah	Bharatiya Janata Party	23 April 2019	Won
7	Ahmedabad East	None	Hasmukh Patel	Bharatiya Janata Party	23 April 2019	Won
8	Ahmedabad West	SC	Kirit Solanki	Bharatiya Janata Party	23 April 2019	Won
9	Surendranagar	None	Mahendra Munjapara	Bharatiya Janata Party	23 April 2019	Won
10	Rajkot	None	Mohan Kundariya	Bharatiya Janata Party	23 April 2019	Won
11	Porbandar	None	Rameshbhai Dhaduk	Bharatiya Janata Party	23 April 2019	Won
12	Jamnagar	None	Poonamben Maadam	Bharatiya Janata Party	23 April 2019	Won
13	Junagadh	None	Rajesh Chudasama	Bharatiya Janata Party	23 April 2019	Won
14	Amreli	None	Naranbhai Kachhadia	Bharatiya Janata Party	23 April 2019	Won
15	Bhavnagar	None	Bharti Shiyal	Bharatiya Janata Party	23 April 2019	Won
16	Anand	None	Miteshbhai Patel	Bharatiya Janata Party	23 April 2019	Won
17	Kheda	None	Devusinh Chauhan	Bharatiya Janata Party	23 April 2019	Won
18	Panchmahal	None	Ratansinh Rathod	Bharatiya Janata Party	23 April 2019	Won
19	Dahod	ST	Jasvantsinh Bhabhor	Bharatiya Janata Party	23 April 2019	Won
20	Vadodara	None	Ranjanben Bhatt	Bharatiya Janata Party	23 April 2019	Won
21	Chhota Udaipur	ST	Gitaben Rathva	Bharatiya Janata Party	23 April 2019	Won
22	Bharuch	None	Mansukhbhai Vasava	Bharatiya Janata Party	23 April 2019	Won
23	Bardoli	ST	Parbhubhai Vasava	Bharatiya Janata Party	23 April 2019	Won
24	Surat	None	Darshana Jardosh	Bharatiya Janata Party	23 April 2019	Won
25	Navsari	None	C. R. Patil	Bharatiya Janata Party	23 April 2019	Won
26	Valsad	ST	Dr. K C Patel	Bharatiya Janata Party	23 April 2019	Won

== Haryana ==
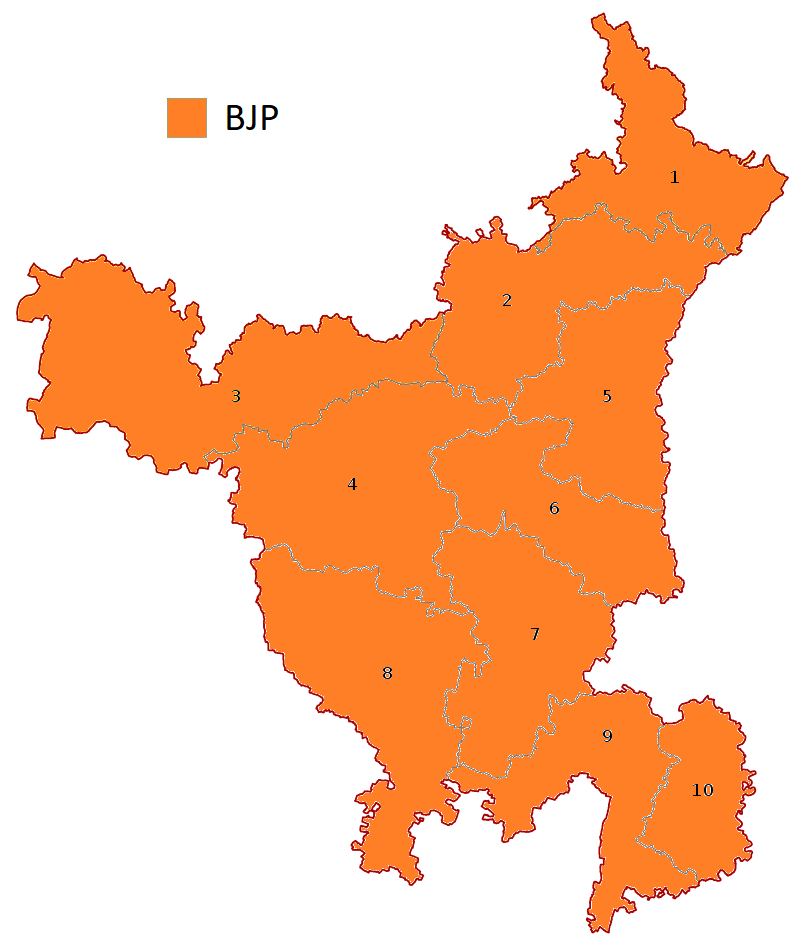
Haryana NDA

BJP (10)

Constituency No.	Constituency	Reserved for (SC/ST/None)	Candidate	Party	Poll On	Result
1	Ambala	SC	Rattan Lal Kataria	Bharatiya Janata Party	12 May 2019	Won
2	Kurukshetra	None	Nayab Singh Saini	Bharatiya Janata Party	12 May 2019	Won
3	Sirsa	SC	Suneeta Duggal	Bharatiya Janata Party	12 May 2019	Won
4	Hisar	None	Brijendra Singh	Bharatiya Janata Party	12 May 2019	Won
5	Karnal	None	Sanjay Bhatia	Bharatiya Janata Party	12 May 2019	Won
6	Sonipat	None	Ramesh Chander Kaushik	Bharatiya Janata Party	12 May 2019	Won
7	Rohtak	None	Arvind Kumar Sharma	Bharatiya Janata Party	12 May 2019	Won
8	Bhiwani–Mahendragarh	None	Dharmvir Singh	Bharatiya Janata Party	12 May 2019	Won
9	Gurgaon	None	Rao Inderjit Singh	Bharatiya Janata Party	12 May 2019	Won
10	Faridabad	None	Krishan Pal Gurjar	Bharatiya Janata Party	12 May 2019	Won

== Himachal Pradesh ==
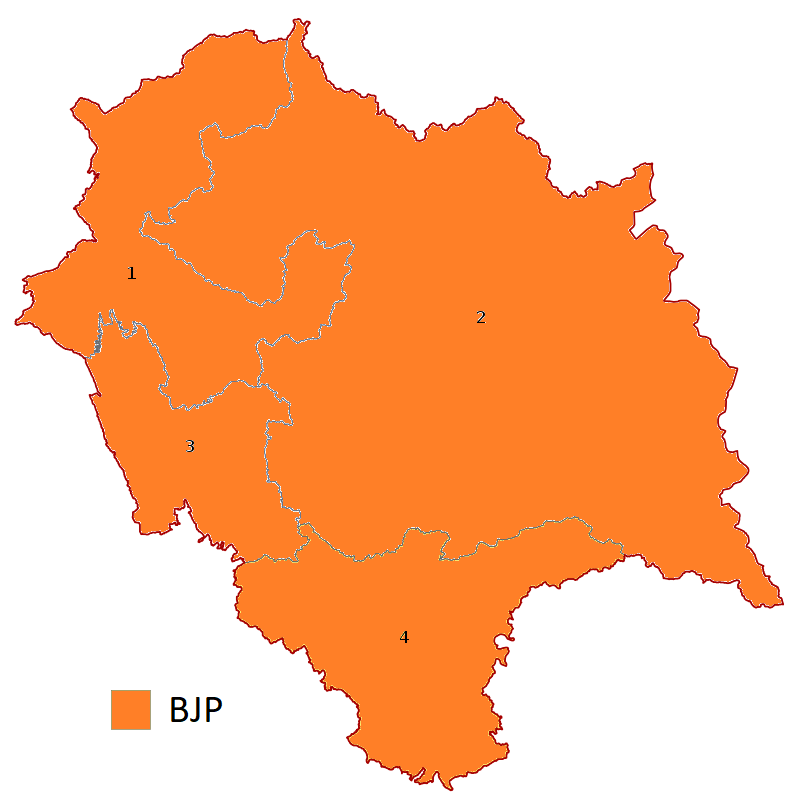
Himachal Pradesh NDA

BJP (4)

Constituency No.	Constituency	Reserved for (SC/ST/None)	Candidate	Party	Poll On	Result
1	Kangra	None	Kishan Kapoor	Bharatiya Janata Party	19 May 2019	Won
2	Mandi	None	Ram Swaroop Sharma	Bharatiya Janata Party	19 May 2019	Won
3	Hamirpur	None	Anurag Thakur	Bharatiya Janata Party	19 May 2019	Won
4	Shimla	SC	Suresh Kashyap	Bharatiya Janata Party	19 May 2019	Won

== Jammu and Kashmir ==
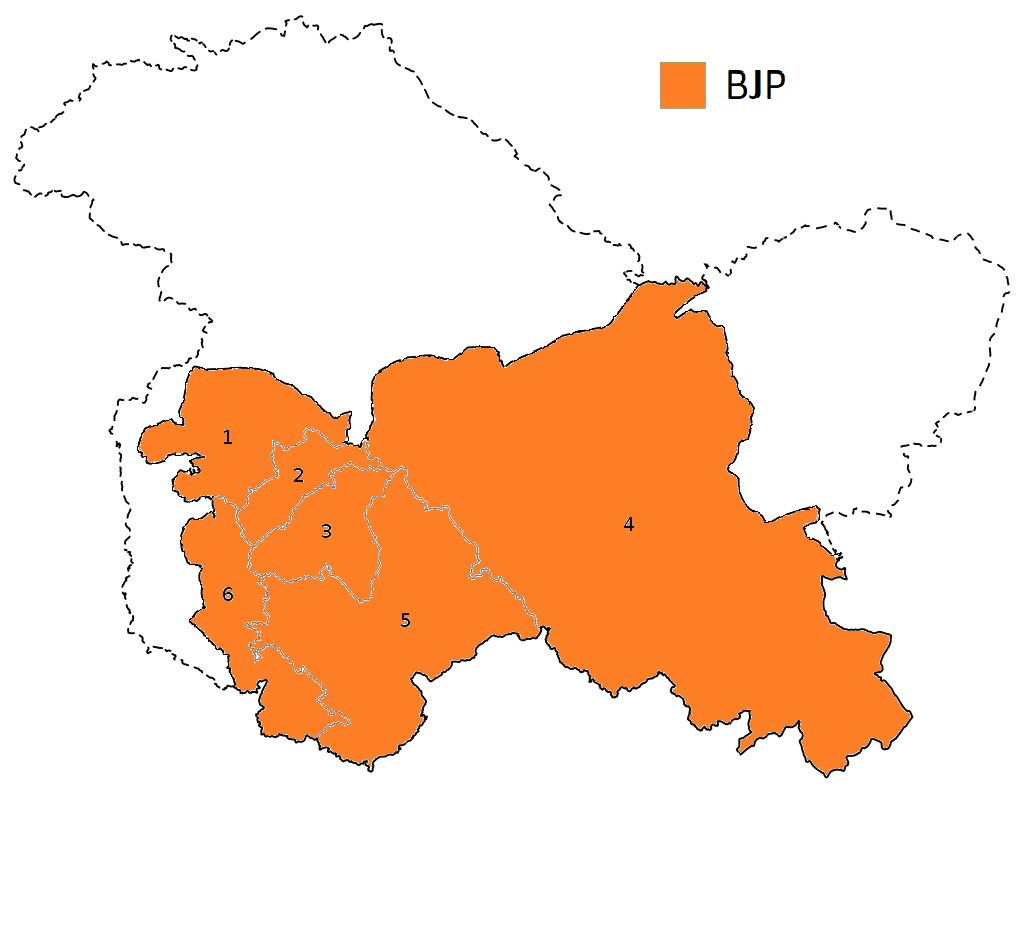
Jammu & Kashmir NDA

BJP (6)

Constituency No.	Constituency	Reserved for (SC/ST/None)	Candidate	Party	Poll On	Result
1	Baramulla	None	M. M. War	Bharatiya Janata Party	11 April 2019	Lost
2	Srinagar	None	Khalid Jehangir	Bharatiya Janata Party	18 April 2019	Lost
3	Anantnag	None	Sofi Youssaf	Bharatiya Janata Party	23 April, 29 April, 6 May 2019	Lost
4	Ladakh	None	Jamyang Tsering Namgyal	Bharatiya Janata Party	6 May 2019	Won
5	Udhampur	None	Jitendra Singh	Bharatiya Janata Party	18 April 2019	Won
6	Jammu	None	Jugal Kishore Sharma	Bharatiya Janata Party	11 April 2019	Won

== Jharkhand ==
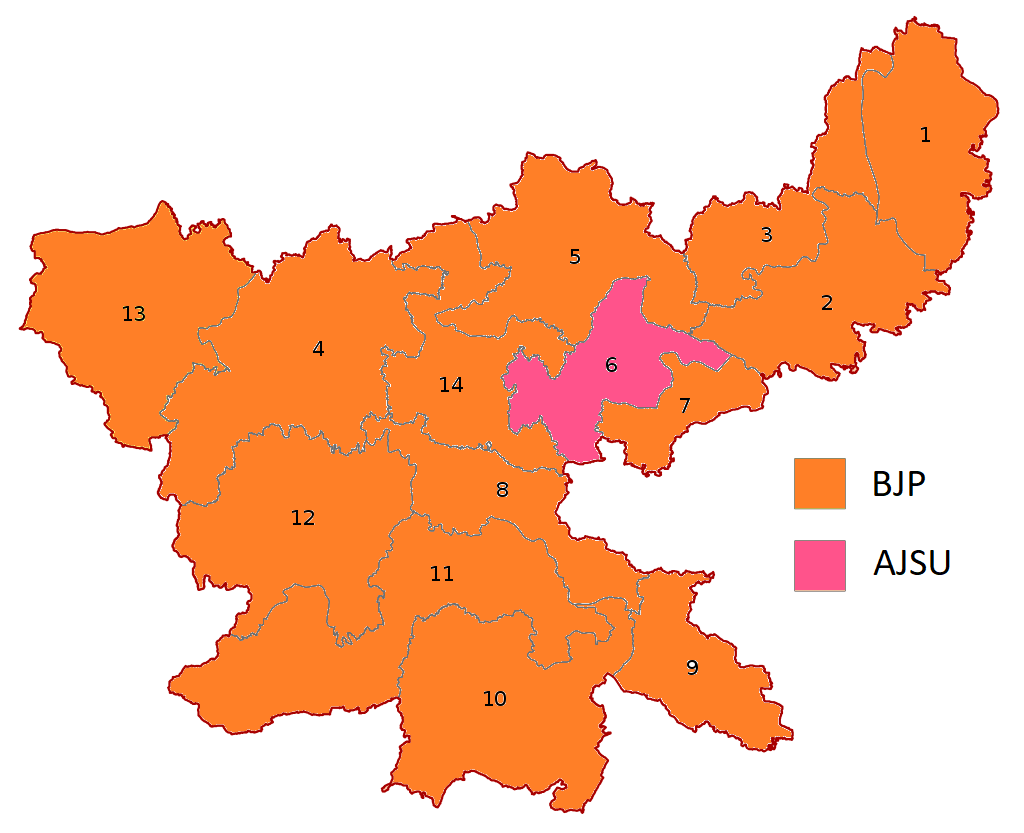
Jharkhand NDA

BJP (13) AJSU (1)

Constituency No.	Constituency	Reserved for (SC/ST/None)	Candidate	Party	Poll On	Result
1	Rajmahal	ST	Hemlal Murmu	Bharatiya Janata Party	19 May 2019	Lost
2	Dumka	ST	Sunil Soren	Bharatiya Janata Party	19 May 2019	Won
3	Godda	None	Nishikant Dubey	Bharatiya Janata Party	19 May 2019	Won
4	Chatra	None	Sunil Kumar Singh	Bharatiya Janata Party	29 April 2019	Won
5	Kodarma	None	Annapurna Devi Yadav	Bharatiya Janata Party	6 May 2019	Won
6	Giridih	None	Chandra Prakash Chaudhary	All Jharkhand Students Union	12 May 2019	Won
7	Dhanbad	None	Pashupati Nath Singh	Bharatiya Janata Party	12 May 2019	Won
8	Ranchi	None	Sanjay Seth	Bharatiya Janata Party	6 May 2019	Won
9	Jamshedpur	None	Bidyut Baran Mahato	Bharatiya Janata Party	12 May 2019	Won
10	Singhbhum	ST	Laxman Giluwa	Bharatiya Janata Party	12 May 2019	Lost
11	Khunti	ST	Arjun Munda	Bharatiya Janata Party	6 May 2019	Won
12	Lohardaga	ST	Sudarshan Bhagat	Bharatiya Janata Party	29 April 2019	Won
13	Palamau	SC	Vishnu Dayal Ram	Bharatiya Janata Party	29 April 2019	Won
14	Hazaribagh	None	Jayant Sinha	Bharatiya Janata Party	6 May 2019	Won

== Karnataka ==
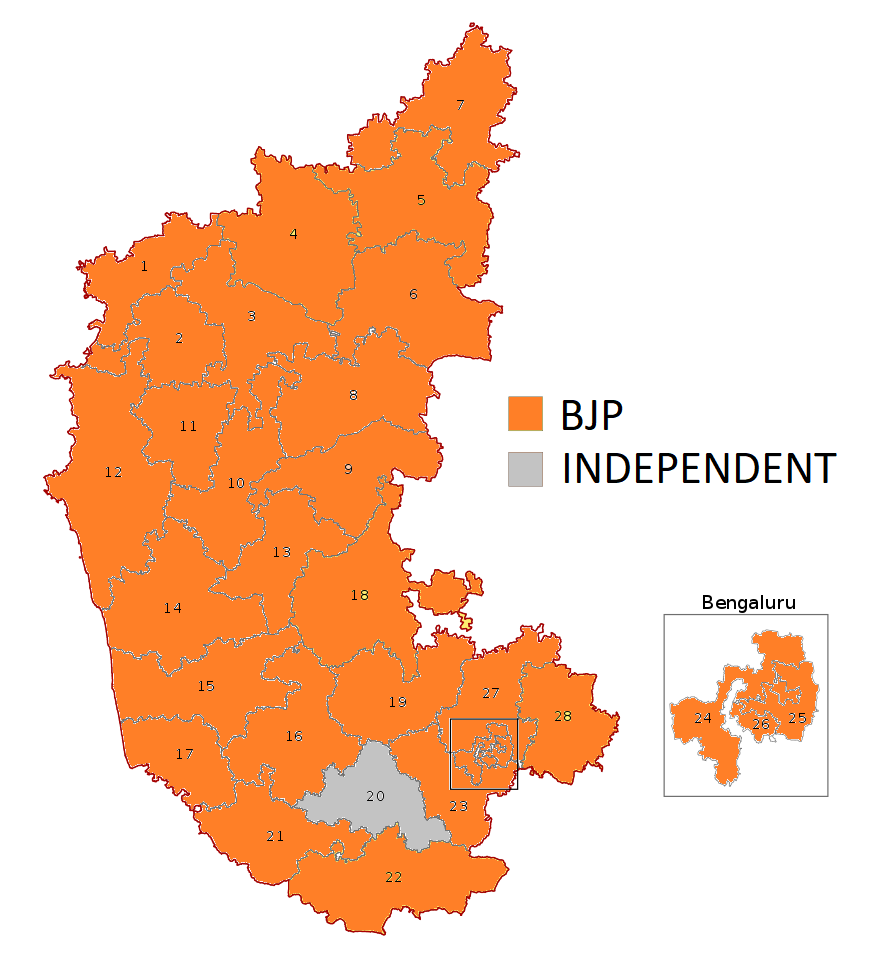
Karnataka NDA

BJP (27) Independent (1)

Constituency No.	Constituency	Reserved for (SC/ST/None)	Candidate	Party	Poll On	Result
1	Chikkodi	None	Annasaheb Jolle	Bharatiya Janata Party	23 April 2019	Won
2	Belagavi	None	Suresh Angadi	Bharatiya Janata Party	23 April 2019	Won
3	Bagalkot	None	P. C. Gaddigoudar	Bharatiya Janata Party	23 April 2019	Won
4	Bijapur	SC	Ramesh Chandappa Jigajinagi	Bharatiya Janata Party	23 April 2019	Won
5	Kalaburagi	SC	Umesh. G. Jadhav	Bharatiya Janata Party	23 April 2019	Won
6	Raichur	ST	Raja Amresh Nayak	Bharatiya Janata Party	23 April 2019	Won
7	Bidar	None	Bhagwanth Khuba	Bharatiya Janata Party	23 April 2019	Won
8	Koppal	None	Karadi Sanganna Amarappa	Bharatiya Janata Party	23 April 2019	Won
9	Bellary	ST	Devendrappa	Bharatiya Janata Party	23 April 2019	Won
10	Haveri	None	Shivkumar Chanabasappa Udasi	Bharatiya Janata Party	23 April 2019	Won
11	Dharwad	None	Pralhad Joshi	Bharatiya Janata Party	23 April 2019	Won
12	Uttara Kannada	None	Anant Kumar Hegde	Bharatiya Janata Party	23 April 2019	Won
13	Davanagere	None	G. M. Siddeshwara	Bharatiya Janata Party	23 April 2019	Won
14	Shimoga	None	B. Y. Raghavendra	Bharatiya Janata Party	23 April 2019	Won
15	Udupi Chikmagalur	None	Shobha Karandlaje	Bharatiya Janata Party	18 April 2019	Won
16	Hassan	None	A. Manju	Bharatiya Janata Party	18 April 2019	Lost
17	Dakshina Kannada	None	Nalin Kumar Kateel	Bharatiya Janata Party	18 April 2019	Won
18	Chitradurga	SC	A. Narayana Swamy	Bharatiya Janata Party	18 April 2019	Won
19	Tumkur	None	G. S. Basavaraj	Bharatiya Janata Party	18 April 2019	Won
20	Mandya	None	Sumalatha	Independent	18 April 2019	Won
21	Mysore	None	Pratap Simha	Bharatiya Janata Party	18 April 2019	Won
22	Chamarajanagar	SC	Srinivasa Prasad	Bharatiya Janata Party	18 April 2019	Won
23	Bangalore Rural	None	Ashwathnarayan Gowda	Bharatiya Janata Party	18 April 2019	Lost
24	Bangalore North	None	D. V. Sadananda Gowda	Bharatiya Janata Party	18 April 2019	Won
25	Bangalore Central	None	P. C. Mohan	Bharatiya Janata Party	18 April 2019	Won
26	Bangalore South	None	L. S. Tejaswi Surya	Bharatiya Janata Party	18 April 2019	Won
27	Chikballapur	None	B. N. Bache Gowda	Bharatiya Janata Party	18 April 2019	Won
28	Kolar	SC	S. Muniswamy	Bharatiya Janata Party	18 April 2019	Won

== Kerala ==
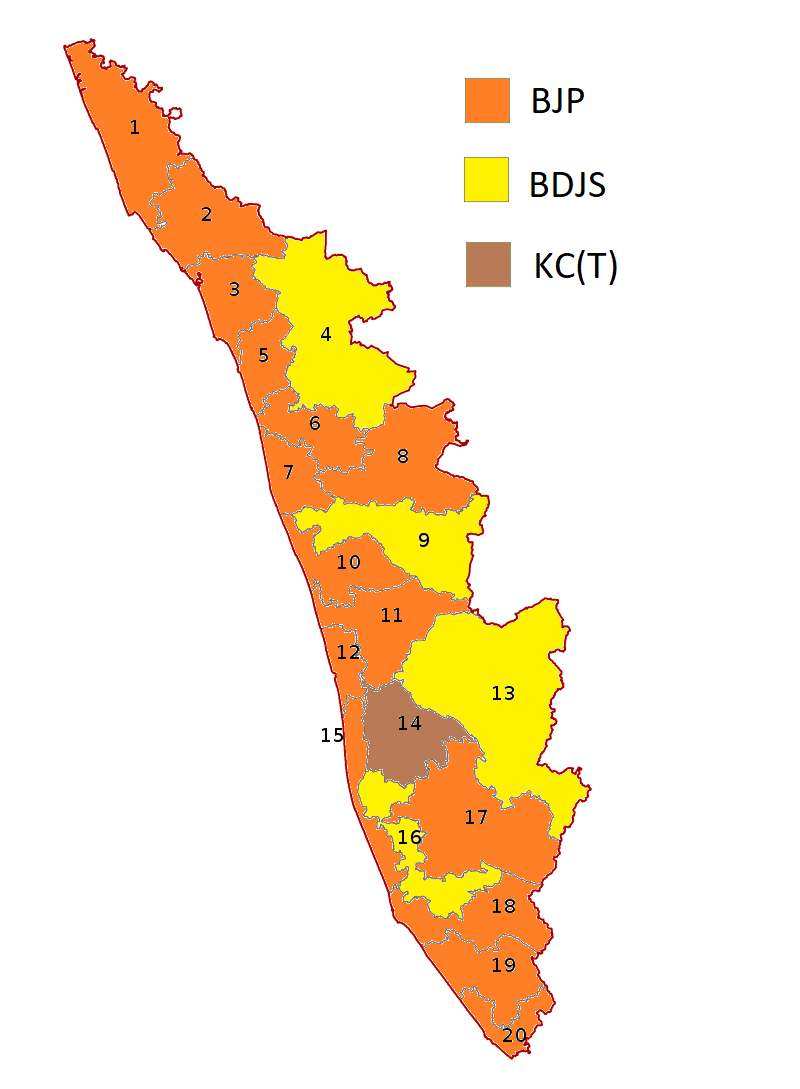
Kerala NDA

BJP (15) BDJS (4) KC(T) (1)

Constituency No.	Constituency	Reserved for (SC/ST/None)	Candidate	Party	Poll On	Result
1	Kasaragod	None	Raveesh Thanthri Kuntar	Bharatiya Janata Party	23 April 2019	Lost
2	Kannur	None	C. K. Padmanabhan	Bharatiya Janata Party	23 April 2019	Lost
3	Vatakara	None	V. K. Sajeevan	Bharatiya Janata Party	23 April 2019	Lost
4	Wayanad	None	Thushar Vellapally	Bharath Dharma Jana Sena	23 April 2019	Lost
5	Kozhikode	None	K. P. Prakash Babu	Bharatiya Janata Party	23 April 2019	Lost
6	Malappuram	None	Unnikrishnan Master	Bharatiya Janata Party	23 April 2019	Lost
7	Ponnani	None	V. T. Rema	Bharatiya Janata Party	23 April 2019	Lost
8	Palakkad	None	C Krishna Kumar	Bharatiya Janata Party	23 April 2019	Lost
9	Alathur	SC	T. V. Babu	Bharath Dharma Jana Sena	23 April 2019	Lost
10	Thrissur	None	Suresh Gopi	Bharatiya Janata Party	23 April 2019	Lost
11	Chalakudy	None	A. N. Radhakrishnan	Bharatiya Janata Party	23 April 2019	Lost
12	Ernakulam	None	Alphons Kannanthanam	Bharatiya Janata Party	23 April 2019	Lost
13	Idukki	None	Biju Krishnan	Bharath Dharma Jana Sena	23 April 2019	Lost
14	Kottayam	None	P. C. Thomas	Kerala Congress (Thomas)	23 April 2019	Lost
15	Alappuzha	None	K. S. Radhakrishnan	Bharatiya Janata Party	23 April 2019	Lost
16	Mavelikara	SC	Thazhava Sahadevan	Bharath Dharma Jana Sena	23 April 2019	Lost
17	Pathanamthitta	None	K. Surendran	Bharatiya Janata Party	23 April 2019	Lost
18	Kollam	None	K. V. Sabu	Bharatiya Janata Party	23 April 2019	Lost
19	Attingal	None	Shobha Surendran	Bharatiya Janata Party	23 April 2019	Lost
20	Thiruvananthapuram	None	Kummanam Rajasekharan	Bharatiya Janata Party	23 April 2019	Lost

== Madhya Pradesh ==
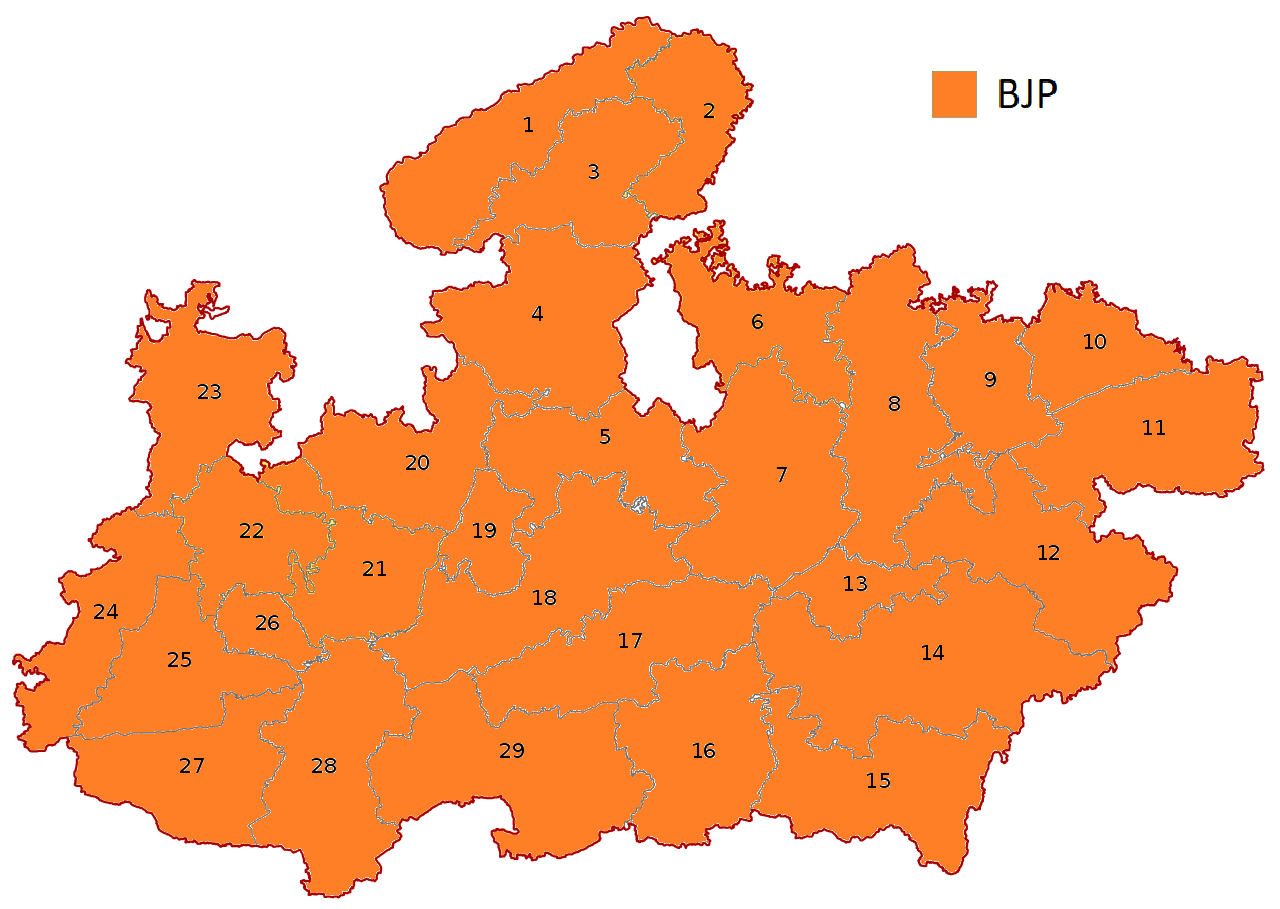
Madhya Pradesh NDA

BJP (29)

Constituency No.	Constituency	Reserved for (SC/ST/None)	Candidate	Party	Poll On	Result
1	Morena	None	Narendra Singh Tomar	Bharatiya Janata Party	12 May 2019	Won
2	Bhind	SC	Sandhya Rai	Bharatiya Janata Party	12 May 2019	Won
3	Gwalior	None	Vivek Sejwalker	Bharatiya Janata Party	12 May 2019	Won
4	Guna	None	K.P. Yadav	Bharatiya Janata Party	12 May 2019	Won
5	Sagar	None	Raj Bahadur Singh	Bharatiya Janata Party	12 May 2019	Won
6	Tikamgarh	SC	Virendra Kumar Khatik	Bharatiya Janata Party	6 May 2019	Won
7	Damoh	None	Prahlad Singh Patel	Bharatiya Janata Party	6 May 2019	Won
8	Khajuraho	None	Vishnu Datt Sharma	Bharatiya Janata Party	6 May 2019	Won
9	Satna	None	Ganesh Singh	Bharatiya Janata Party	6 May 2019	Won
10	Rewa	None	Janardan Mishra	Bharatiya Janata Party	6 May 2019	Won
11	Sidhi	None	Riti Pathak	Bharatiya Janata Party	29 April 2019	Won
12	Shahdol	ST	Himadri Singh	Bharatiya Janata Party	29 April 2019	Won
13	Jabalpur	None	Rakesh Singh	Bharatiya Janata Party	29 April 2019	Won
14	Mandla	ST	Faggan Singh Kulaste	Bharatiya Janata Party	29 April 2019	Won
15	Balaghat	None	Dhal Singh Bisen	Bharatiya Janata Party	29 April 2019	Won
16	Chhindwara	None	Natthan Shah	Bharatiya Janata Party	29 April 2019	Lost
17	Hoshangabad	None	Rao Uday Pratap Singh	Bharatiya Janata Party	6 May 2019	Won
18	Vidisha	None	Ramakant Bhargav	Bharatiya Janata Party	12 May 2019	Won
19	Bhopal	None	Sadhvi Pragya	Bharatiya Janata Party	12 May 2019	Won
20	Rajgarh	None	Rodmal Nagar	Bharatiya Janata Party	12 May 2019	Won
21	Dewas	SC	Mahendra Solanki	Bharatiya Janata Party	19 May 2019	Won
22	Ujjain	SC	Anil Firojiya	Bharatiya Janata Party	19 May 2019	Won
23	Mandsaur	None	Sudhir Gupta	Bharatiya Janata Party	19 May 2019	Won
24	Ratlam	ST	G S Damor	Bharatiya Janata Party	19 May 2019	Won
25	Dhar	ST	Chhatar Singh Darbar	Bharatiya Janata Party	19 May 2019	Won
26	Indore	None	Shankar Lalwani	Bharatiya Janata Party	19 May 2019	Won
27	Khargone	ST	Gajendra Patel	Bharatiya Janata Party	19 May 2019	Won
28	Khandwa	None	Nand Kumar Singh Chouhan	Bharatiya Janata Party	19 May 2019	Won
29	Betul	ST	Durgadas Uike	Bharatiya Janata Party	6 May 2019	Won

== Maharashtra ==
2019 Indian general election Maharashtra

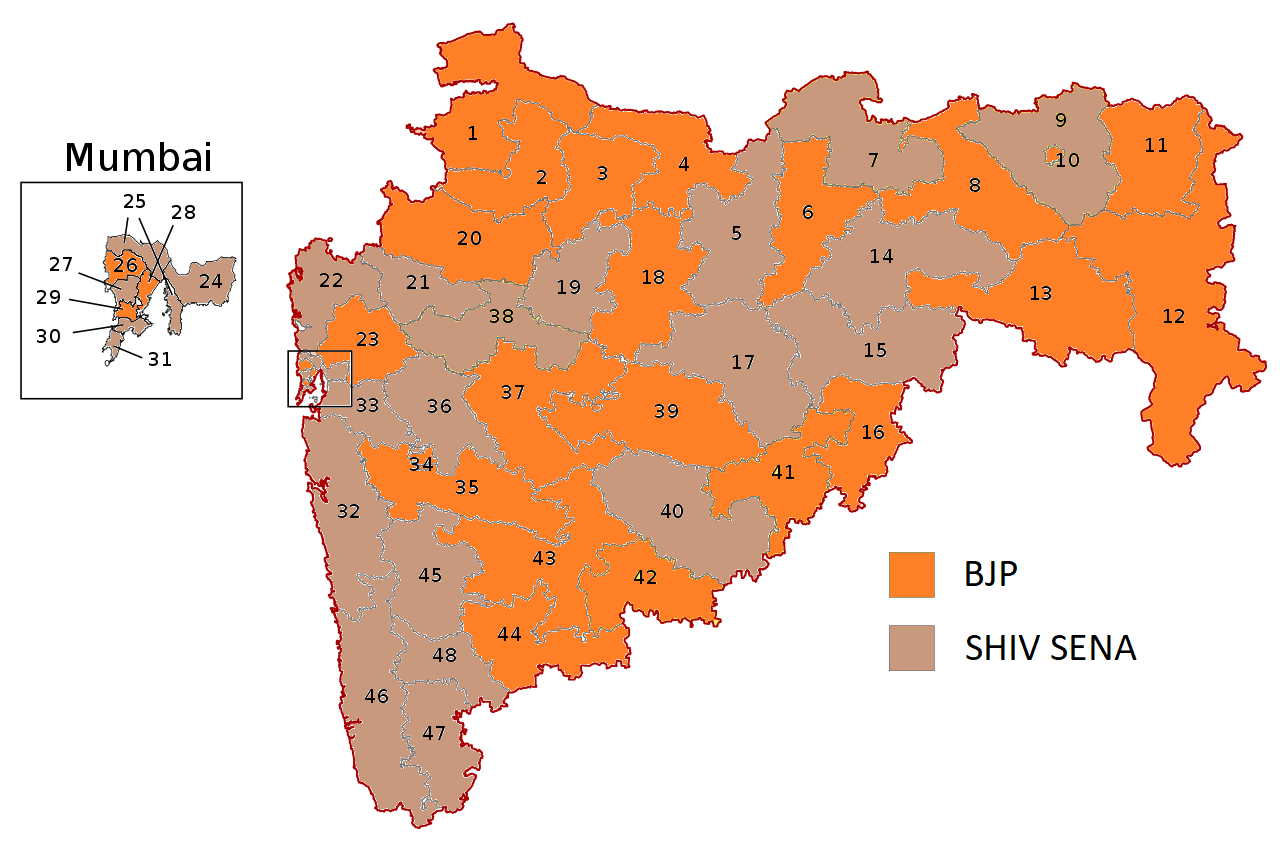
Maharashtra NDA

BJP (25) SS (23)

Constituency No.	Constituency	Reserved for (SC/ST/None)	Candidate	Party	Poll On	Result
1	Nandurbar	SC	Heena Gavit	Bharatiya Janata Party	29 April 2019	Won
2	Dhule	None	Subhash Bhamre	Bharatiya Janata Party	29 April 2019	Won
3	Jalgaon	None	Unmesh Patil	Bharatiya Janata Party	23 April 2019	Won
4	Raver	None	Raksha Khadse	Bharatiya Janata Party	23 April 2019	Won
5	Buldhana	None	Prataprao Ganpatrao Jadhav	Shiv Sena	18 April 2019	Won
6	Akola	None	Sanjay Shamrao Dhotre	Bharatiya Janata Party	18 April 2019	Won
7	Amravati	SC	Anandrao Adsul	Shiv Sena	18 April 2019	Lost
8	Wardha	None	Ramdas Chandrabhanji Tadas	Bharatiya Janata Party	11 April 2019	Won
9	Ramtek	SC	Krupal Tumane	Shiv Sena	11 April 2019	Won
10	Nagpur	None	Nitin Jairam Gadkari	Bharatiya Janata Party	11 April 2019	Won
11	Bhandara–Gondia	None	Sunil Baburao Mendhe	Bharatiya Janata Party	11 April 2019	Won
12	Gadchiroli–Chimur	ST	Ashok Mahadeorao Nete	Bharatiya Janata Party	11 April 2019	Won
13	Chandrapur	None	Hansraj Gangaram Ahir	Bharatiya Janata Party	11 April 2019	Lost
14	Yavatmal–Washim	None	Bhavana Gawali	Shiv Sena	11 April 2019	Won
15	Hingoli	None	Hemant Sriram Patil	Shiv Sena	18 April 2019	Won
16	Nanded	None	Prataprao Govindrao Chikhalikar	Bharatiya Janata Party	18 April 2019	Won
17	Parbhani	None	Sanjay Haribhau Jadhav	Shiv Sena	18 April 2019	Won
18	Jalna	None	Raosaheb Danve	Bharatiya Janata Party	23 April 2019	Won
19	Aurangabad	None	Chandrakant Khaire	Shiv Sena	23 April 2019	Lost
20	Dindori	ST	Dr. Bharati Pawar	Bharatiya Janata Party	29 April 2019	Won
21	Nashik	None	Hemant Godse	Shiv Sena	29 April 2019	Won
22	Palghar	ST	Rajendra Gavit	Shiv Sena	29 April 2019	Won
23	Bhiwandi	None	Kapil Moreshwar Patil	Bharatiya Janata Party	29 April 2019	Won
24	Kalyan	None	Shrikant Shinde	Shiv Sena	29 April 2019	Won
25	Thane	None	Rajan Vichare	Shiv Sena	29 April 2019	Won
26	Mumbai North	None	Gopal Chinayya Shetty	Bharatiya Janata Party	29 April 2019	Won
27	Mumbai North West	None	Gajanan Kirtikar	Shiv Sena	29 April 2019	Won
28	Mumbai North East	None	Manoj Kotak	Bharatiya Janata Party	29 April 2019	Won
29	Mumbai North Central	None	Poonam Mahajan	Bharatiya Janata Party	29 April 2019	Won
30	Mumbai South Central	None	Rahul Shewale	Shiv Sena	29 April 2019	Won
31	Mumbai South	None	Arvind Sawant	Shiv Sena	29 April 2019	Won
32	Raigad	None	Anant Geete	Shiv Sena	23 April 2019	Lost
33	Maval	None	Shrirang Barne	Shiv Sena	29 April 2019	Won
34	Pune	None	Girish Bapat	Bharatiya Janata Party	23 April 2019	Won
35	Baramati	None	Kanchan Rahul Kul	Bharatiya Janata Party	23 April 2019	Lost
36	Shirur	None	Shivajirao Adhalarao Patil	Shiv Sena	29 April 2019	Lost
37	Ahmednagar	None	Sujay Vikhe Patil	Bharatiya Janata Party	23 April 2019	Won
38	Shirdi	SC	Sadashiv Lokhande	Shiv Sena	29 April 2019	Won
39	Beed	None	Pritam Munde	Bharatiya Janata Party	18 April 2019	Won
40	Osmanabad	None	Omraje Nimbalkar	Shiv Sena	18 April 2019	Won
41	Latur	SC	Sudhakar Bhalerao Shrungare	Bharatiya Janata Party	18 April 2019	Won
42	Solapur	SC	Dr. Jaisidhesvar Swami	Bharatiya Janata Party	18 April 2019	Won
43	Madha	None	Ranjit Naik-Nimbalkar	Bharatiya Janata Party	23 April 2019	Won
44	Sangli	None	Sanjaykaka Patil	Bharatiya Janata Party	23 April 2019	Won
45	Satara	None	Narendra Patil	Shiv Sena	23 April 2019	Lost
46	Ratnagiri–Sindhudurg	None	Vinayak Raut	Shiv Sena	23 April 2019	Won
47	Kolhapur	None	Sanjay Mandlik	Shiv Sena	23 April 2019	Won
48	Hatkanangle	None	Dhairyashil Mane	Shiv Sena	23 April 2019	Won

== Manipur ==
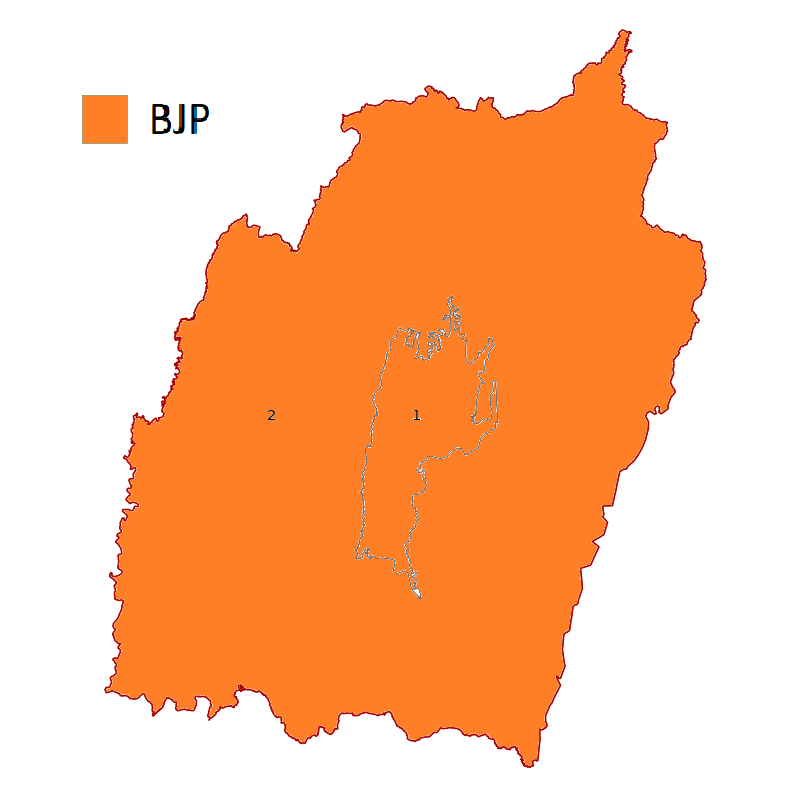
Manipur NDA

BJP (2)

Constituency No.	Constituency	Reserved for (SC/ST/None)	Candidate	Party	Poll On	Result
1	Inner Manipur	None	R. K. Ranjan Singh	Bharatiya Janata Party	18 April 2019	Won
2	Outer Manipur	ST	H. Shokhopao Mate	Bharatiya Janata Party	11 April 2019	Lost

== Meghalaya ==
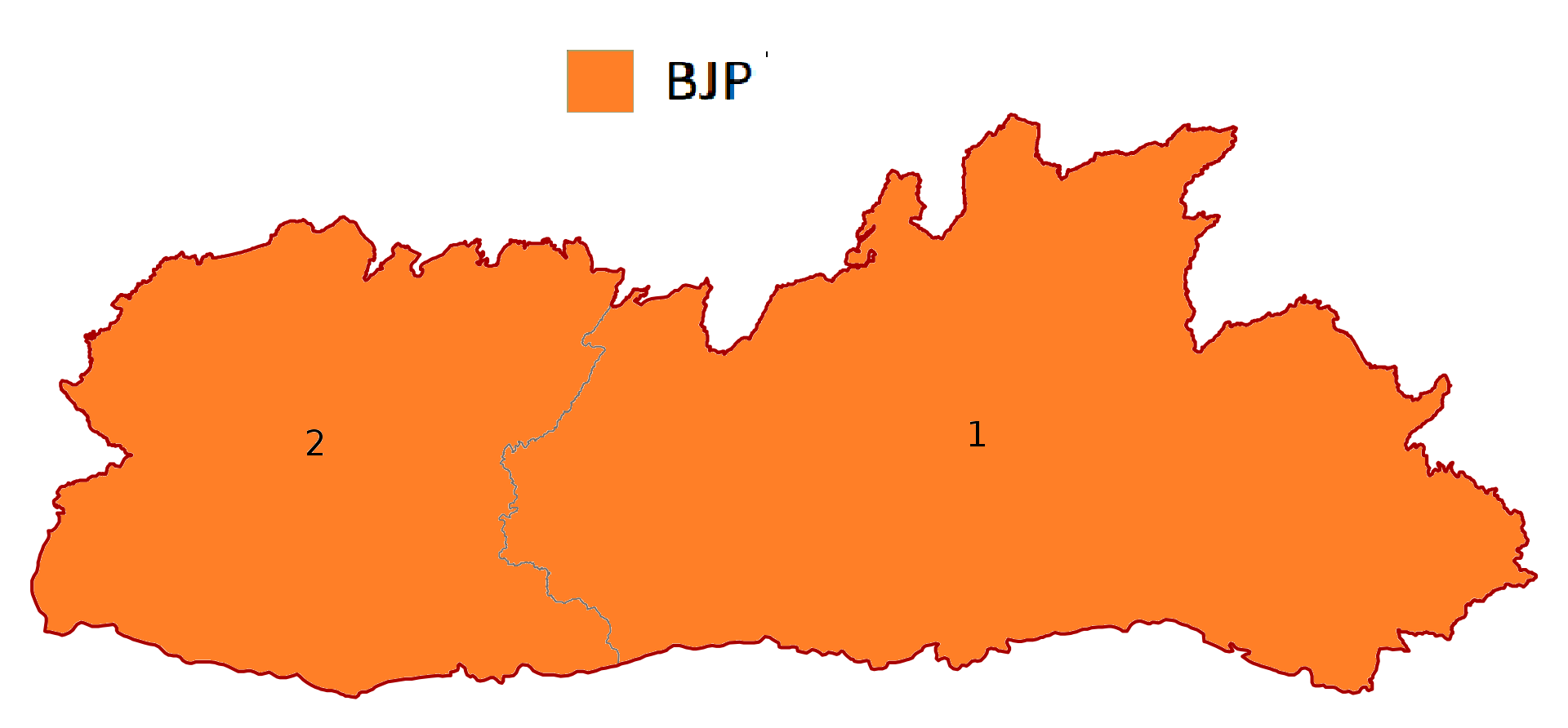
Meghalaya NDA

BJP (2)

Note: NDA member National People's Party won in Tura, although there was no pre-poll alliance.

Constituency No.	Constituency	Reserved for (SC/ST/None)	Candidate	Party	Poll On	Result
1	Shillong	ST	Sanbor Shullai	Bharatiya Janata Party	11 April 2019	Lost
2	Tura	ST	Rikman G. Momin	Bharatiya Janata Party	11 April 2019	Lost

== Mizoram ==
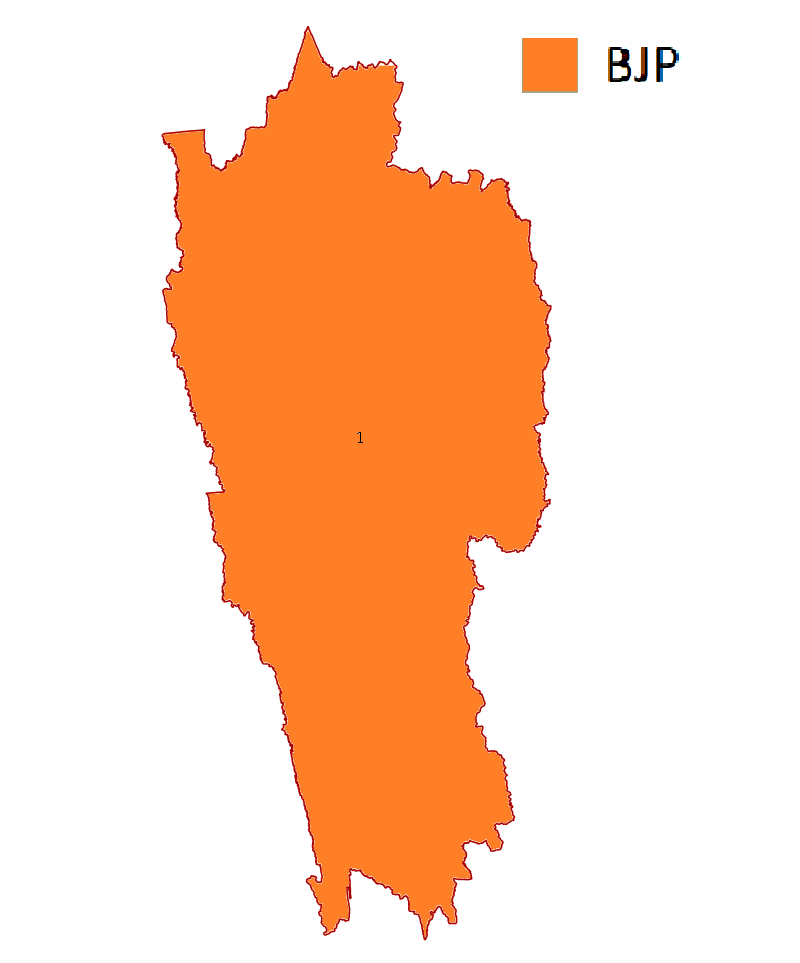
Mizoram NDA

BJP (1)

Note: NDA member Mizo National Front won, although there was no pre-poll alliance.

Constituency No.	Constituency	Reserved for (SC/ST/None)	Candidate	Party	Poll On	Result
1	Mizoram	ST	Nirupam Chakma	Bharatiya Janata Party	11 April 2019	Lost

== Nagaland ==
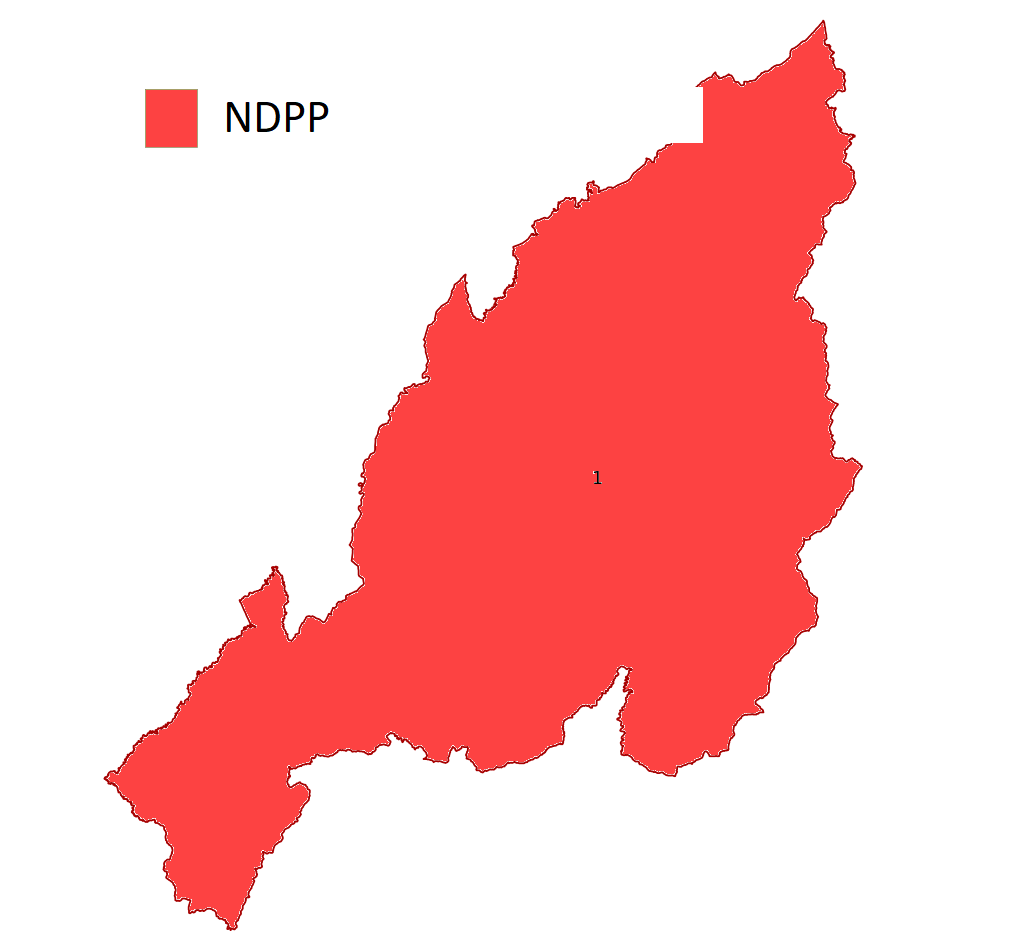
Nagaland NDA

NDPP (1)

Constituency No.	Constituency	Reserved for (SC/ST/None)	Candidate	Party	Poll On	Result
1	Nagaland	None	Tokheho Yepthomi	Nationalist Democratic Progressive Party	11 April 2019	Won

== Odisha ==
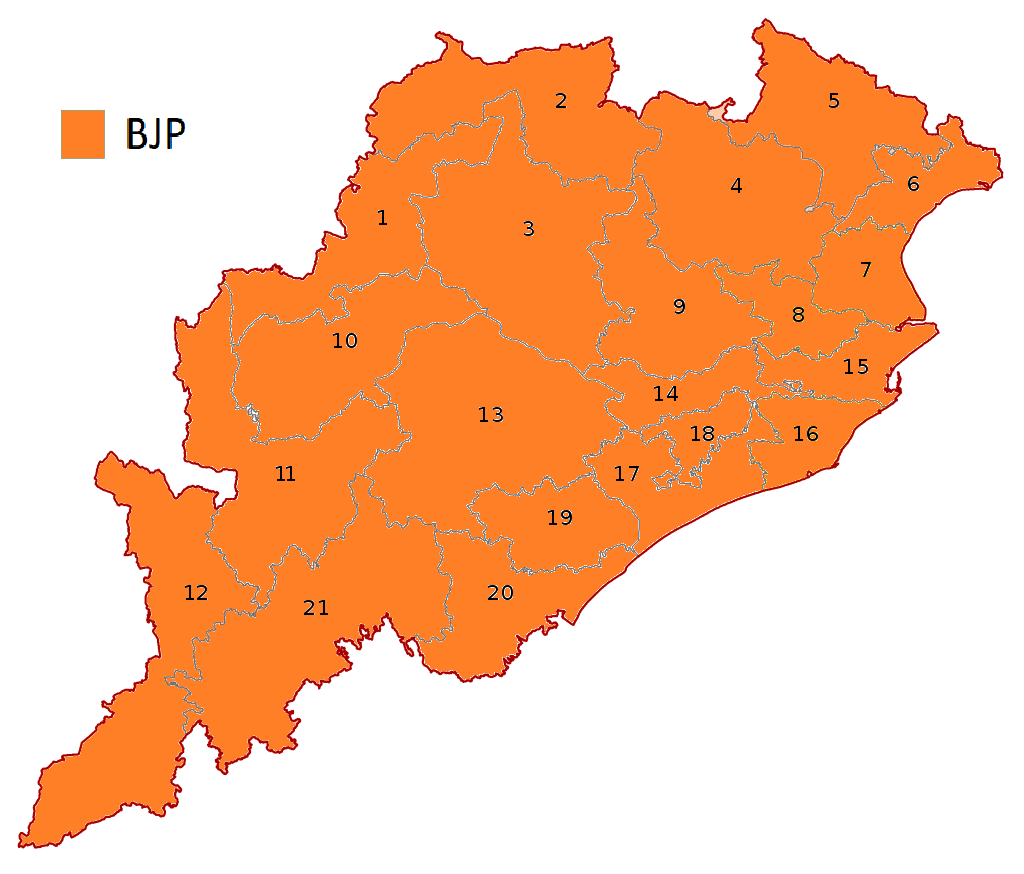
Odisha NDA

BJP (21)

Constituency No.	Constituency	Reserved for (SC/ST/None)	Candidate	Party	Poll On	Result
1	Bargarh	None	Suresh Pujari	Bharatiya Janata Party	18 April 2019	Won
2	Sundargarh	ST	Jual Oram	Bharatiya Janata Party	18 April 2019	Won
3	Sambalpur	None	Nitesh Ganga Deb	Bharatiya Janata Party	23 April 2019	Won
4	Keonjhar	ST	Ananta Nayak	Bharatiya Janata Party	23 April 2019	Lost
5	Mayurbhanj	ST	Bishweswar Tudu	Bharatiya Janata Party	29 April 2019	Won
6	Balasore	None	Pratap Sarangi	Bharatiya Janata Party	29 April 2019	Won
7	Bhadrak	SC	Avimanyu Sethi	Bharatiya Janata Party	29 April 2019	Lost
8	Jajpur	SC	Amiya Kanta Mallick	Bharatiya Janata Party	29 April 2019	Lost
9	Dhenkanal	None	Rudra Narayan Pani	Bharatiya Janata Party	23 April 2019	Lost
10	Bolangir	None	Sangeeta Kumari Singh Deo	Bharatiya Janata Party	18 April 2019	Won
11	Kalahandi	None	Basanta Kumar Panda	Bharatiya Janata Party	11 April 2019	Won
12	Nabarangpur	ST	Balabhadra Majhi	Bharatiya Janata Party	11 April 2019	Lost
13	Kandhamal	None	M. A. Kharavela Swain	Bharatiya Janata Party	18 April 2019	Lost
14	Cuttack	None	Prakash Mishra	Bharatiya Janata Party	23 April 2019	Lost
15	Kendrapara	None	Baijayant Panda	Bharatiya Janata Party	29 April 2019	Lost
16	Jagatsinghpur	SC	Bibhu Prasad Tarai	Bharatiya Janata Party	29 April 2019	Lost
17	Puri	None	Sambit Patra	Bharatiya Janata Party	23 April 2019	Lost
18	Bhubaneswar	None	Aparajita Sarangi	Bharatiya Janata Party	23 April 2019	Won
19	Aska	None	Anita Subhadarshini	Bharatiya Janata Party	18 April 2019	Lost
20	Berhampur	None	Bhrugu Baxipatra	Bharatiya Janata Party	11 April 2019	Lost
21	Koraput	ST	Jayaram Pangi	Bharatiya Janata Party	11 April 2019	Lost

== Punjab ==
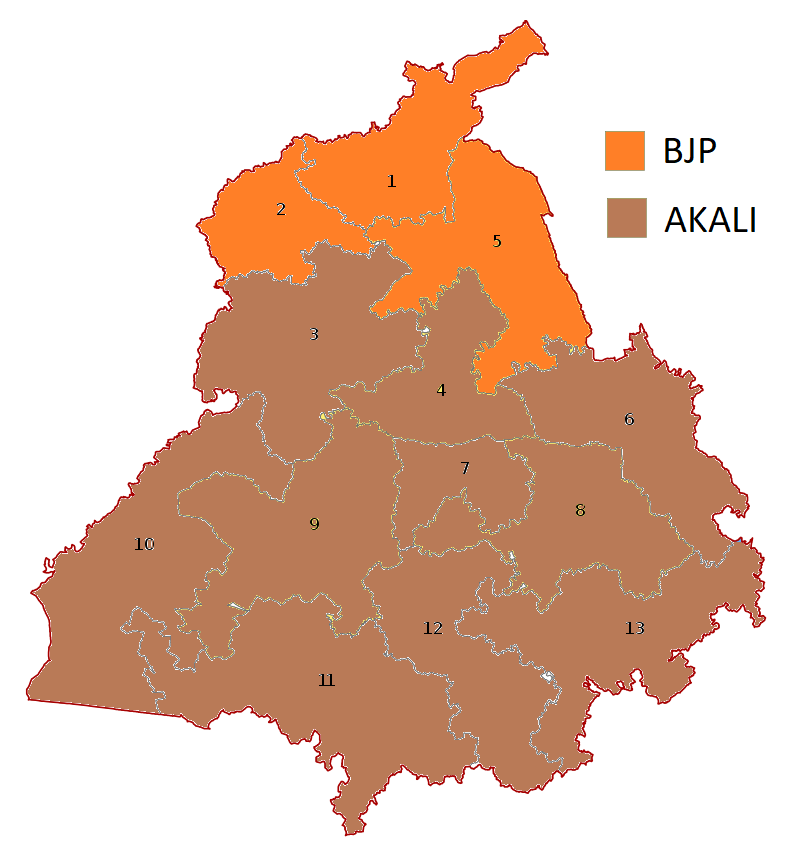
Punjab NDA

SAD (10) BJP (3)

Constituency No.	Constituency	Reserved for (SC/ST/None)	Candidate	Party	Poll On	Result
1	Gurdaspur	None	Sunny Deol	Bharatiya Janata Party	19 May 2019	Won
2	Amritsar	None	Hardeep Singh Puri	Bharatiya Janata Party	19 May 2019	Lost
3	Khadoor Sahib	None	Bibi Jagir Kaur	Shiromani Akali Dal	19 May 2019	Lost
4	Jalandhar	SC	Charanjit Singh Atwal	Shiromani Akali Dal	19 May 2019	Lost
5	Hoshiarpur	SC	Som Parkash	Bharatiya Janata Party	19 May 2019	Won
6	Anandpur Sahib	None	Prem Singh Chandumajra	Shiromani Akali Dal	19 May 2019	Lost
7	Ludhiana	None	Maheshinder Singh	Shiromani Akali Dal	19 May 2019	Lost
8	Fatehgarh Sahib	SC	Darbara Singh Guru	Shiromani Akali Dal	19 May 2019	Lost
9	Faridkot	SC	Gulzar Singh Ranike	Shiromani Akali Dal	19 May 2019	Lost
10	Firozpur	None	Sukhbir Singh Badal	Shiromani Akali Dal	19 May 2019	Won
11	Bathinda	None	Harsimrat Kaur Badal	Shiromani Akali Dal	19 May 2019	Won
12	Sangrur	None	Parminder Singh Dhindsa	Shiromani Akali Dal	19 May 2019	Lost
13	Patiala	None	Surjit Singh Rakhra	Shiromani Akali Dal	19 May 2019	Lost

== Rajasthan ==
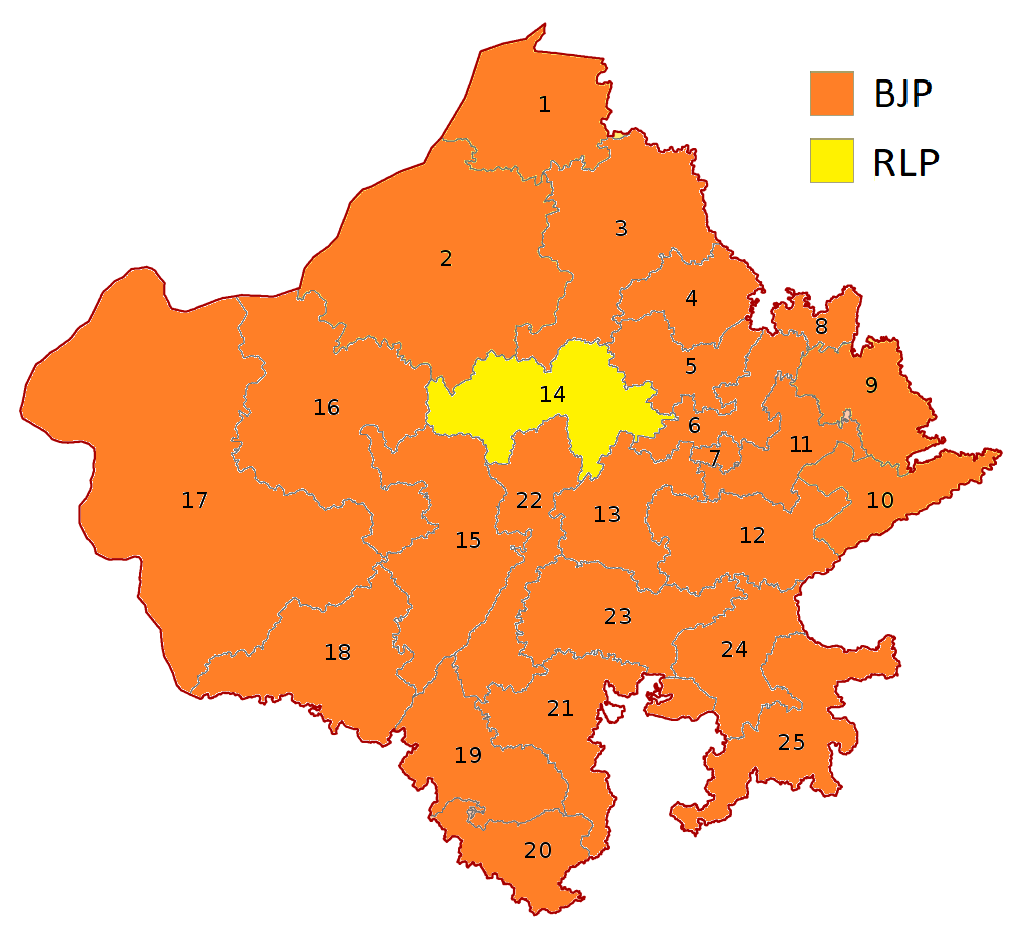
Rajasthan NDA

BJP (24) RLP (1)

Constituency No.	Constituency	Reserved for (SC/ST/None)	Candidate	Party	Poll On	Result
1	Ganganagar-Hanumangarh	SC	Nihal Chand Chauhan	Bharatiya Janata Party	6 May 2019	Won
2	Bikaner	SC	Arjun Ram Meghwal	Bharatiya Janata Party	6 May 2019	Won
3	Churu	None	Rahul Kaswan	Bharatiya Janata Party	6 May 2019	Won
4	Jhunjhunu	None	Narendra Kumar	Bharatiya Janata Party	6 May 2019	Won
5	Sikar	None	Sumedhanand Saraswati	Bharatiya Janata Party	6 May 2019	Won
6	Jaipur Rural	None	Rajyavardhan Singh Rathore	Bharatiya Janata Party	6 May 2019	Won
7	Jaipur	None	Ramcharan Bohra	Bharatiya Janata Party	6 May 2019	Won
8	Alwar	None	Mahant Balaknath	Bharatiya Janata Party	6 May 2019	Won
9	Bharatpur	SC	Ranjeeta Kohli	Bharatiya Janata Party	6 May 2019	Won
10	Karauli–Dholpur	SC	Manoj Rajoria	Bharatiya Janata Party	6 May 2019	Won
11	Dausa	ST	Jaskaur Meena	Bharatiya Janata Party	6 May 2019	Won
12	Tonk–Sawai Madhopur	None	Sukhbir Singh Jaunapuria	Bharatiya Janata Party	29 April 2019	Won
13	Ajmer	None	Bhagirath Chaudhary	Bharatiya Janata Party	29 April 2019	Won
14	Nagaur	None	Hanuman Beniwal	Rashtriya Loktantrik Party	6 May 2019	Won
15	Pali	None	Prem Prakash Chaudhary	Bharatiya Janata Party	29 April 2019	Won
16	Jodhpur	None	Gajendra Singh Shekhawat	Bharatiya Janata Party	29 April 2019	Won
17	Barmer-Jaisalmer	None	Kailash Choudhary	Bharatiya Janata Party	29 April 2019	Won
18	Jalore-Sirohi	None	Devji Mansinghram Patel	Bharatiya Janata Party	29 April 2019	Won
19	Udaipur	ST	Arjunlal Meena	Bharatiya Janata Party	29 April 2019	Won
20	Banswara-Dungarpur	ST	Kanak Mal Katara	Bharatiya Janata Party	29 April 2019	Won
21	Chittorgarh-Pratapgarh	None	Chandra Prakash Joshi	Bharatiya Janata Party	29 April 2019	Won
22	Rajsamand	None	Diya Kumari	Bharatiya Janata Party	29 April 2019	Won
23	Bhilwara	None	Subhash Chandra Baheria	Bharatiya Janata Party	29 April 2019	Won
24	Kota-Bundi	None	Om Birla	Bharatiya Janata Party	29 April 2019	Won
25	Jhalawar–Baran	None	Dushyant Singh	Bharatiya Janata Party	29 April 2019	Won

== Sikkim ==
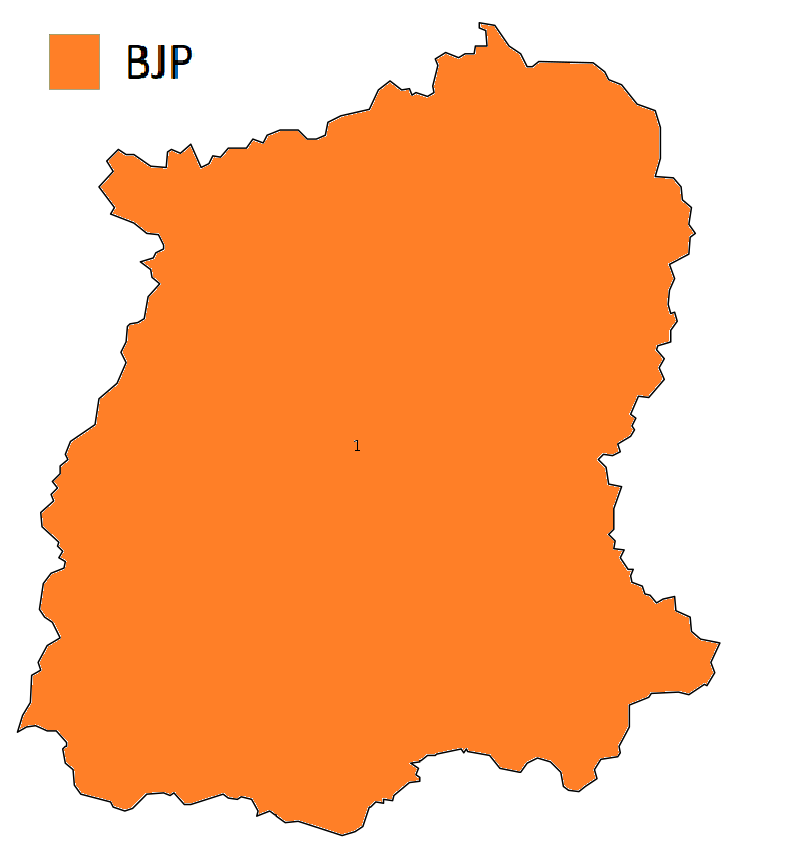
Sikkim NDA

BJP (1)

Constituency No.	Constituency	Reserved for (SC/ST/None)	Candidate	Party	Poll On	Result
1	Sikkim	None	Laten Tshering Sherpa	Bharatiya Janata Party	11 April 2019	Lost

== Tamil Nadu ==
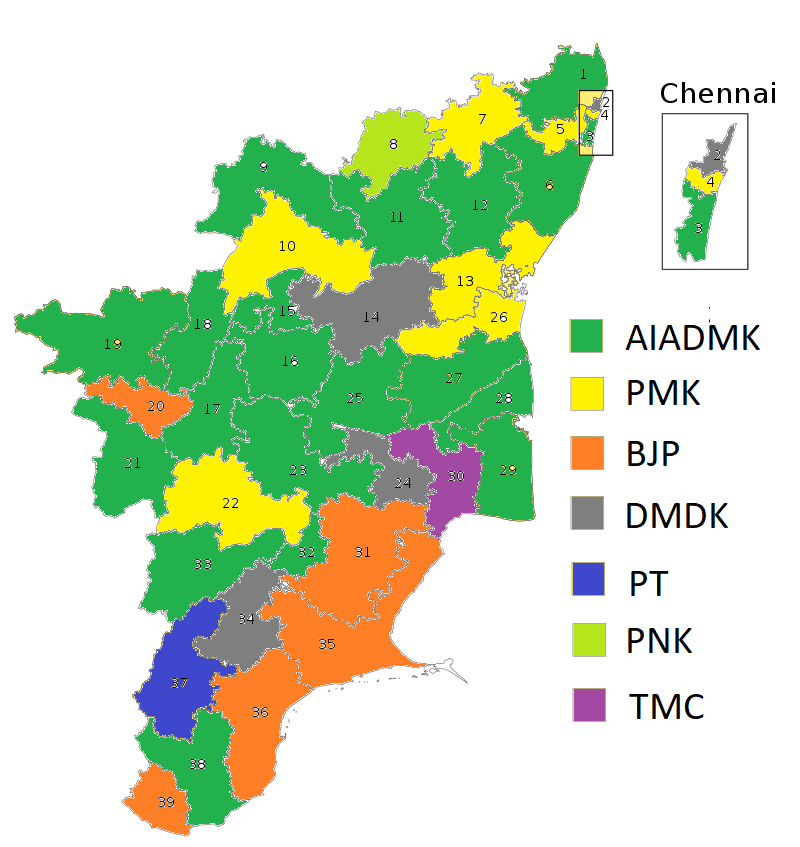
Tamil Nadu NDA

AIADMK (20) PMK (7) BJP (5) DMDK (4) TMC (1) PNK (1) PT (1)

Constituency No.	Constituency	Reserved for (SC/ST/None)	Candidate	Party	Poll On	Result
1	Thiruvallur	SC	Ponnusamy Venugopal	All India Anna Dravida Munnetra Kazhagam	18 April 2019	Lost
2	Chennai North	None	R. Mohan Raj	Desiya Murpokku Dravida Kazhagam	18 April 2019	Lost
3	Chennai South	None	J. Jayavardhan	All India Anna Dravida Munnetra Kazhagam	18 April 2019	Lost
4	Chennai Central	None	Sam Paul. S.R.	Pattali Makkal Katchi	18 April 2019	Lost
5	Sriperumbudur	None	A. Vaithialingam	Pattali Makkal Katchi	18 April 2019	Lost
6	Kancheepuram	SC	K. Maragatham	All India Anna Dravida Munnetra Kazhagam	18 April 2019	Lost
7	Arakkonam	None	A. K. Moorthy	Pattali Makkal Katchi	18 April 2019	Lost
8	Vellore	None	A. C. Shanmugam	Puthiya Needhi Katchi	5 August 2019	Lost
9	Krishnagiri	None	K. P. Munusamy	All India Anna Dravida Munnetra Kazhagam	18 April 2019	Lost
10	Dharmapuri	None	Anbumani Ramadoss	Pattali Makkal Katchi	18 April 2019	Lost
11	Tiruvannamalai	None	S. S. Krishnamoorthy	All India Anna Dravida Munnetra Kazhagam	18 April 2019	Lost
12	Arani	None	V. Elumalai	All India Anna Dravida Munnetra Kazhagam	18 April 2019	Lost
13	Villupuram	SC	Vadivel Ravanan	Pattali Makkal Katchi	18 April 2019	Lost
14	Kallakurichi	None	L. K. Sudhish	Desiya Murpokku Dravida Kazhagam	18 April 2019	Lost
15	Salem	None	K. R. S. Saravanan	All India Anna Dravida Munnetra Kazhagam	18 April 2019	Lost
16	Namakkal	None	P. Kaliappan	All India Anna Dravida Munnetra Kazhagam	18 April 2019	Lost
17	Erode	None	G. Manimaran	All India Anna Dravida Munnetra Kazhagam	18 April 2019	Lost
18	Tiruppur	None	M. S. M. Anandan	All India Anna Dravida Munnetra Kazhagam	18 April 2019	Lost
19	Nilgiris	SC	M. Thiyagarajan	All India Anna Dravida Munnetra Kazhagam	18 April 2019	Lost
20	Coimbatore	None	C. P. Radhakrishnan	Bharatiya Janata Party	18 April 2019	Lost
21	Pollachi	None	C. Mahendran	All India Anna Dravida Munnetra Kazhagam	18 April 2019	Lost
22	Dindigul	None	K. Jyothi	Pattali Makkal Katchi	18 April 2019	Lost
23	Karur	None	M. Thambidurai	All India Anna Dravida Munnetra Kazhagam	18 April 2019	Lost
24	Tiruchirappalli	None	Dr. V. Elangovan	Desiya Murpokku Dravida Kazhagam	18 April 2019	Lost
25	Perambalur	None	N. R. Sivapathi	All India Anna Dravida Munnetra Kazhagam	18 April 2019	Lost
26	Cuddalore	None	R. Govindasamy	Pattali Makkal Katchi	18 April 2019	Lost
27	Chidambaram	SC	P. Chandrasekar	All India Anna Dravida Munnetra Kazhagam	18 April 2019	Lost
28	Mayiladuthurai	None	S. Asaimani	All India Anna Dravida Munnetra Kazhagam	18 April 2019	Lost
29	Nagapattinam	SC	Thazhai M. Saravanan	All India Anna Dravida Munnetra Kazhagam	18 April 2019	Lost
30	Thanjavur	None	N. R. Natarajan	Tamil Maanila Congress	18 April 2019	Lost
31	Sivaganga	None	H. Raja	Bharatiya Janata Party	18 April 2019	Lost
32	Madurai	None	V. V. R. Rajsathyan	All India Anna Dravida Munnetra Kazhagam	18 April 2019	Lost
33	Theni	None	O. P. Ravindranath Kumar	All India Anna Dravida Munnetra Kazhagam	18 April 2019	Won
34	Virudhunagar	None	R. Azhagarsamy	Desiya Murpokku Dravida Kazhagam	18 April 2019	Lost
35	Ramanathapuram	None	Nainar Nagendran	Bharatiya Janata Party	18 April 2019	Lost
36	Thoothukudi	None	Tamilisai Soundararajan	Bharatiya Janata Party	18 April 2019	Lost
37	Tenkasi	SC	Dr. K. Krishnasamy	Puthiya Tamilagam	18 April 2019	Lost
38	Tirunelveli	None	P. H. Paul Manoj Pandian	All India Anna Dravida Munnetra Kazhagam	18 April 2019	Lost
39	Kanyakumari	None	Pon Radhakrishnan	Bharatiya Janata Party	18 April 2019	Lost

== Telangana ==
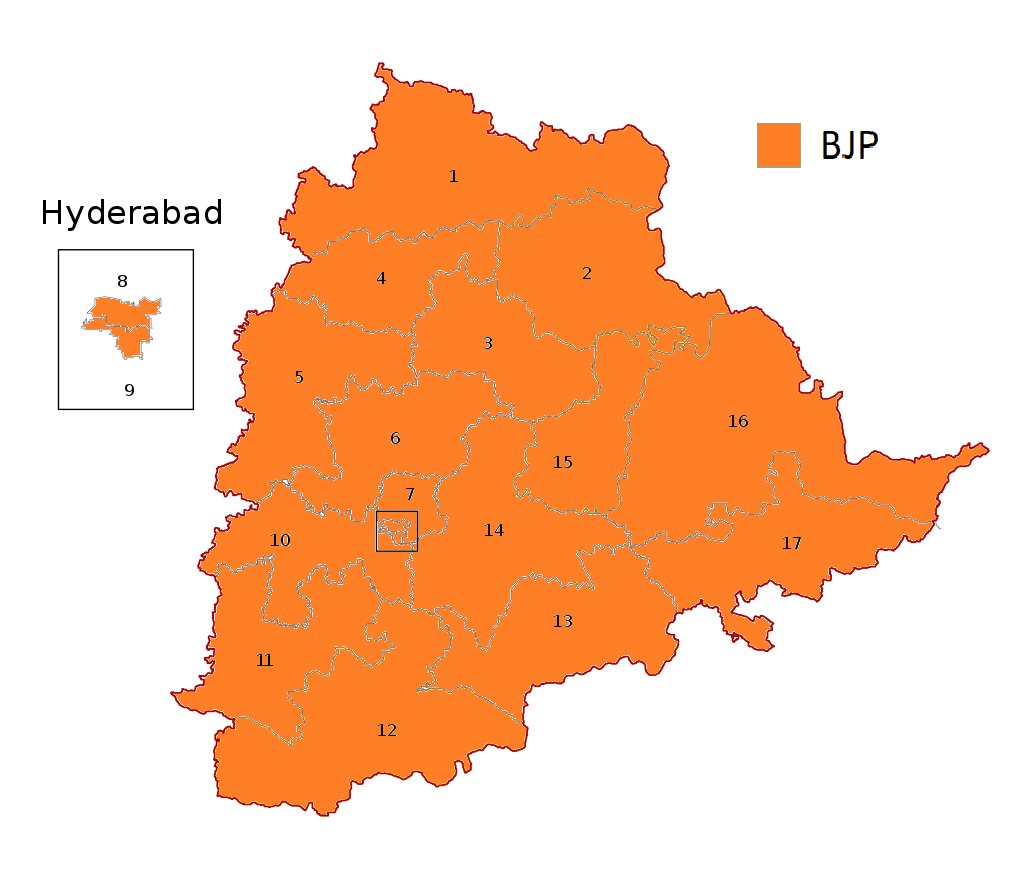
Telangana NDA

BJP (17)

Constituency No.	Constituency	Reserved for (SC/ST/None)	Candidate	Party	Poll On	Result
1	Adilabad	ST	Soyam Bapu Rao	Bharatiya Janata Party	11 April 2019	Won
2	Peddapalle	SC	Sogala Kumar	Bharatiya Janata Party	11 April 2019	Lost
3	Karimnagar	None	Bandi Sanjay Kumar	Bharatiya Janata Party	11 April 2019	Won
4	Nizamabad	None	Dharmapuri Arvind	Bharatiya Janata Party	11 April 2019	Won
5	Zahirabad	None	Banala Laxman Reddy	Bharatiya Janata Party	11 April 2019	Lost
6	Medak	None	Raghunandan Rao	Bharatiya Janata Party	11 April 2019	Lost
7	Malkajgiri	None	Naraparaju Ramchander Rao	Bharatiya Janata Party	11 April 2019	Lost
8	Secunderabad	None	G. Kishan Reddy	Bharatiya Janata Party	11 April 2019	Won
9	Hyderabad	None	Dr. Bhagwanth Rao	Bharatiya Janata Party	11 April 2019	Lost
10	Chevella	None	B. Janardhan Reddy	Bharatiya Janata Party	11 April 2019	Lost
11	Mahbubnagar	None	D. K. Aruna	Bharatiya Janata Party	11 April 2019	Lost
12	Nagarkurnool	SC	Bangaru Sruthi	Bharatiya Janata Party	11 April 2019	Lost
13	Nalgonda	None	Garlapati Jithender Kumar	Bharatiya Janata Party	11 April 2019	Lost
14	Bhongir	None	P. V. Shamsunder Rao	Bharatiya Janata Party	11 April 2019	Lost
15	Warangal	SC	Chinta Sambamurthy	Bharatiya Janata Party	11 April 2019	Lost
16	Mahabubabad	ST	Jatothu Hussain Naik	Bharatiya Janata Party	11 April 2019	Lost
17	Khammam	None	Vasudev Rao	Bharatiya Janata Party	11 April 2019	Lost

== Tripura ==
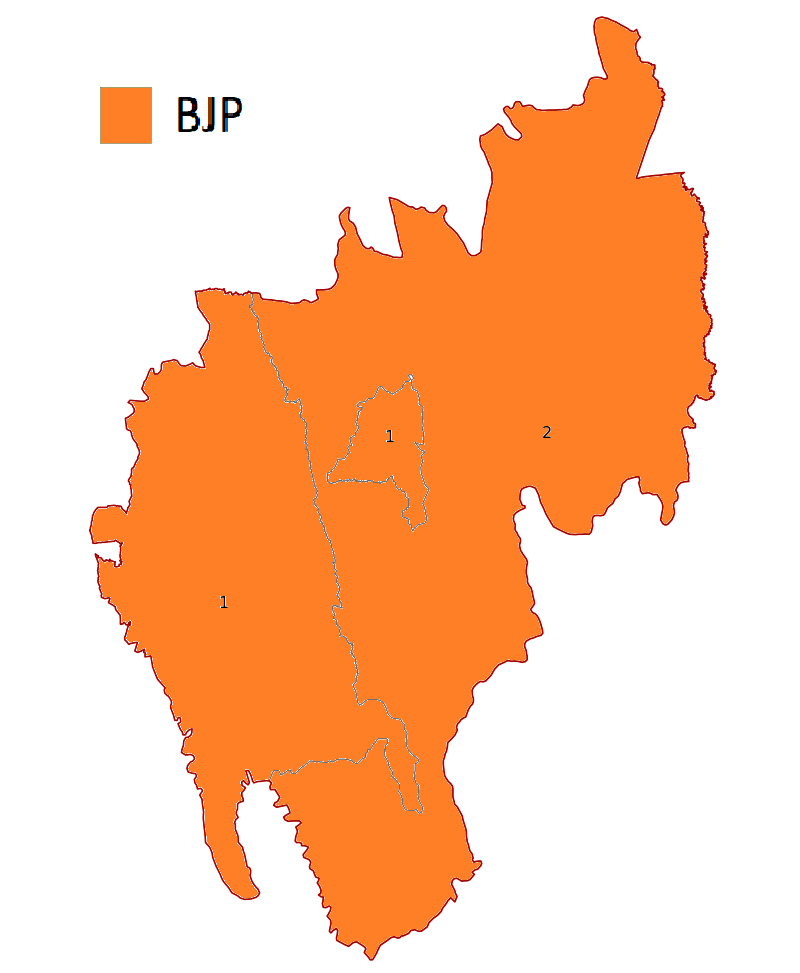
Tripura NDA

BJP (2)

Constituency No.	Constituency	Reserved for (SC/ST/None)	Candidate	Party	Poll On	Result
1	Tripura West	None	Pratima Bhowmik	Bharatiya Janata Party	11 April 2019	Won
2	Tripura East	ST	Rebati Tripura	Bharatiya Janata Party	23 April 2019	Won

== Uttar Pradesh ==
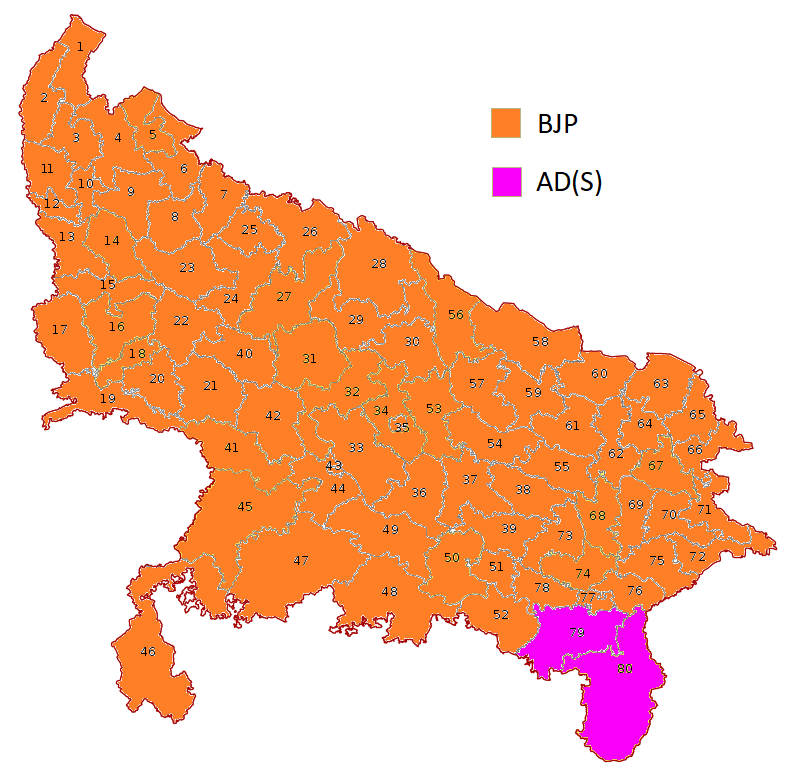
Uttar Pradesh NDA

BJP (78) AD(S) (2)

Constituency No.	Constituency	Reserved for (SC/ST/None)	Candidate	Party	Poll On	Result
1	Saharanpur	None	Raghav Lakhanpal	Bharatiya Janata Party	11 April 2019	Lost
2	Kairana	None	Pradeep Choudhary	Bharatiya Janata Party	11 April 2019	Won
3	Muzaffarnagar	None	Sanjeev Balyan	Bharatiya Janata Party	11 April 2019	Won
4	Bijnor	None	Bharatendra Singh	Bharatiya Janata Party	11 April 2019	Lost
5	Nagina	SC	Yashwant Singh	Bharatiya Janata Party	18 April 2019	Lost
6	Moradabad	None	Kunwar Sarvesh Kumar	Bharatiya Janata Party	23 April 2019	Lost
7	Rampur	None	Jaya Prada	Bharatiya Janata Party	23 April 2019	Lost
8	Sambhal	None	Parmeshwar Lal Saini	Bharatiya Janata Party	23 April 2019	Lost
9	Amroha	None	Kanwar Singh Tanwar	Bharatiya Janata Party	18 April 2019	Lost
10	Meerut	None	Rajendra Agrawal	Bharatiya Janata Party	11 April 2019	Won
11	Baghpat	None	Satya Pal Singh	Bharatiya Janata Party	11 April 2019	Won
12	Ghaziabad	None	V. K. Singh	Bharatiya Janata Party	11 April 2019	Won
13	Gautam Buddh Nagar	None	Mahesh Sharma	Bharatiya Janata Party	11 April 2019	Won
14	Bulandshahr	SC	Bhola Singh	Bharatiya Janata Party	18 April 2019	Won
15	Aligarh	None	Satish Kumar Gautam	Bharatiya Janata Party	18 April 2019	Won
16	Hathras	SC	Rajvir Singh Diler	Bharatiya Janata Party	18 April 2019	Won
17	Mathura	None	Hema Malini	Bharatiya Janata Party	18 April 2019	Won
18	Agra	SC	S. P. Singh Baghel	Bharatiya Janata Party	18 April 2019	Won
19	Fatehpur Sikri	None	Rajkumar Chahar	Bharatiya Janata Party	18 April 2019	Won
20	Firozabad	None	Chandrasen Jadon	Bharatiya Janata Party	23 April 2019	Won
21	Mainpuri	None	Prem Singh Shakya	Bharatiya Janata Party	23 April 2019	Lost
22	Etah	None	Rajveer Singh	Bharatiya Janata Party	23 April 2019	Won
23	Badaun	None	Sanghmitra Maurya	Bharatiya Janata Party	23 April 2019	Won
24	Aonla	None	Dharmendra Kashyap	Bharatiya Janata Party	23 April 2019	Won
25	Bareilly	None	Santosh Kumar Gangwar	Bharatiya Janata Party	23 April 2019	Won
26	Pilibhit	None	Varun Gandhi	Bharatiya Janata Party	23 April 2019	Won
27	Shahjahanpur	SC	Arun Sagar	Bharatiya Janata Party	29 April 2019	Won
28	Kheri	None	Ajay Kumar Mishra	Bharatiya Janata Party	29 April 2019	Won
29	Dhaurahra	None	Rekha Verma	Bharatiya Janata Party	6 May 2019	Won
30	Sitapur	None	Rajesh Verma	Bharatiya Janata Party	6 May 2019	Won
31	Hardoi	SC	Jai Prakash Rawat	Bharatiya Janata Party	29 April 2019	Won
32	Misrikh	SC	Ashok Kumar Rawat	Bharatiya Janata Party	29 April 2019	Won
33	Unnao	None	Sakshi Maharaj	Bharatiya Janata Party	29 April 2019	Won
34	Mohanlalganj	SC	Kaushal Kishore	Bharatiya Janata Party	6 May 2019	Won
35	Lucknow	None	Rajnath Singh	Bharatiya Janata Party	6 May 2019	Won
36	Rae Bareli	None	Dinesh Pratap Singh	Bharatiya Janata Party	6 May 2019	Lost
37	Amethi	None	Smriti Irani	Bharatiya Janata Party	6 May 2019	Won
38	Sultanpur	None	Maneka Gandhi	Bharatiya Janata Party	12 May 2019	Won
39	Pratapgarh	None	Sangam Lal Gupta	Bharatiya Janata Party	12 May 2019	Won
40	Farrukhabad	None	Mukesh Rajput	Bharatiya Janata Party	29 April 2019	Won
41	Etawah	SC	Ram Shankar Katheria	Bharatiya Janata Party	29 April 2019	Won
42	Kannauj	None	Subrat Pathak	Bharatiya Janata Party	29 April 2019	Won
43	Kanpur Urban	None	Satyadev Pachauri	Bharatiya Janata Party	29 April 2019	Won
44	Akbarpur	None	Devendra Singh Bhole	Bharatiya Janata Party	29 April 2019	Won
45	Jalaun	SC	Bhanu Pratap Singh Verma	Bharatiya Janata Party	29 April 2019	Won
46	Jhansi	None	Anurag Sharma	Bharatiya Janata Party	29 April 2019	Won
47	Hamirpur	None	Pushpendra Singh Chandel	Bharatiya Janata Party	29 April 2019	Won
48	Banda	None	R. K. Singh Patel	Bharatiya Janata Party	6 May 2019	Won
49	Fatehpur	None	Niranjan Jyoti	Bharatiya Janata Party	6 May 2019	Won
50	Kaushambi	SC	Vinod Kumar Sonkar	Bharatiya Janata Party	6 May 2019	Won
51	Phulpur	None	Keshari Devi Patel	Bharatiya Janata Party	12 May 2019	Won
52	Prayagraj	None	Rita Bahuguna Joshi	Bharatiya Janata Party	12 May 2019	Won
53	Barabanki	SC	Upendra Singh Rawat	Bharatiya Janata Party	6 May 2019	Won
54	Faizabad	None	Lallu Singh	Bharatiya Janata Party	6 May 2019	Won
55	Ambedkar Nagar	None	Mukut Bihari	Bharatiya Janata Party	12 May 2019	Lost
56	Bahraich	SC	Akshayvara Lal Gaud	Bharatiya Janata Party	6 May 2019	Won
57	Kaiserganj	None	Brij Bhushan Sharan Singh	Bharatiya Janata Party	6 May 2019	Won
58	Shrawasti	None	Daddan Mishra	Bharatiya Janata Party	12 May 2019	Lost
59	Gonda	None	Kirti Vardhan Singh	Bharatiya Janata Party	6 May 2019	Won
60	Domariyaganj	None	Jagdambika Pal	Bharatiya Janata Party	12 May 2019	Won
61	Basti	None	Harish Dwivedi	Bharatiya Janata Party	12 May 2019	Won
62	Sant Kabir Nagar	None	Praveen Kumar Nishad	Bharatiya Janata Party	12 May 2019	Won
63	Maharajganj	None	Pankaj Choudhary	Bharatiya Janata Party	19 May 2019	Won
64	Gorakhpur	None	Ravi Kishan	Bharatiya Janata Party	19 May 2019	Won
65	Kushi Nagar	None	Vijay Dubey	Bharatiya Janata Party	19 May 2019	Won
66	Deoria	None	Ramapati Ram Tripathi	Bharatiya Janata Party	19 May 2019	Won
67	Bansgaon	SC	Kamlesh Paswan	Bharatiya Janata Party	19 May 2019	Won
68	Lalganj	SC	Neelam Sonkar	Bharatiya Janata Party	12 May 2019	Lost
69	Azamgarh	None	Dinesh Lal Yadav 'Nirahua'	Bharatiya Janata Party	12 May 2019	Lost
70	Ghosi	None	Harinarayan Rajbhar	Bharatiya Janata Party	19 May 2019	Lost
71	Salempur	None	Ravindra Kushawaha	Bharatiya Janata Party	19 May 2019	Won
72	Ballia	None	Virendra Singh Mast	Bharatiya Janata Party	19 May 2019	Won
73	Jaunpur	None	Krishna Pratap Singh	Bharatiya Janata Party	12 May 2019	Lost
74	Machhlishahr	SC	B. P. Saroj	Bharatiya Janata Party	12 May 2019	Won
75	Ghazipur	None	Manoj Sinha	Bharatiya Janata Party	19 May 2019	Lost
76	Chandauli	None	Mahendra Nath Pandey	Bharatiya Janata Party	19 May 2019	Won
77	Varanasi	None	Narendra Modi	Bharatiya Janata Party	19 May 2019	Won
78	Bhadohi	None	Ramesh Chand Bind	Bharatiya Janata Party	12 May 2019	Won
79	Mirzapur	None	Anupriya Patel	Apna Dal (Sonelal)	19 May 2019	Won
80	Robertsganj	SC	Pakaudi Lal Kol	Apna Dal (Sonelal)	19 May 2019	Won

== Uttarakhand ==
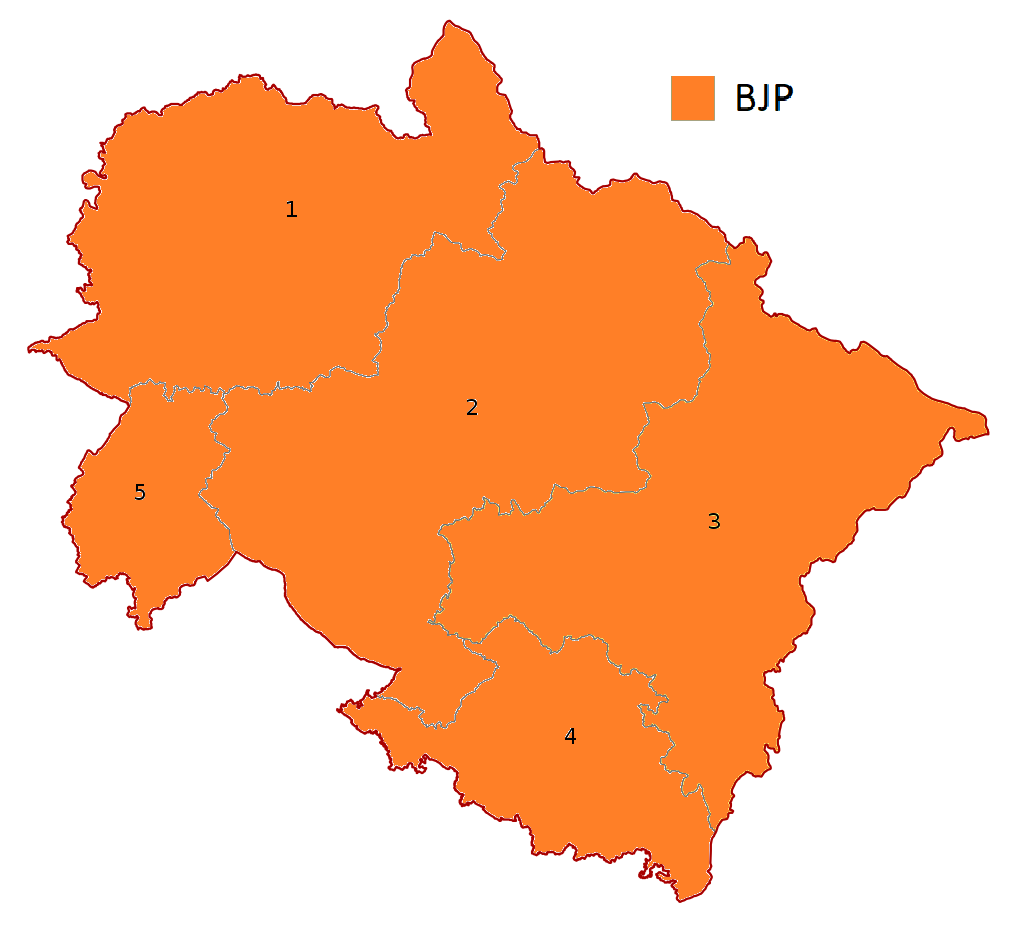
Uttarakhand NDA

BJP (5)

Constituency No.	Constituency	Reserved for (SC/ST/None)	Candidate	Party	Poll On	Result
1	Tehri Garhwal	None	Mala Rajya Laxmi Shah	Bharatiya Janata Party	11 April 2019	Won
2	Garhwal	None	Tirath Singh Rawat	Bharatiya Janata Party	11 April 2019	Won
3	Almora	SC	Ajay Tamta	Bharatiya Janata Party	11 April 2019	Won
4	Nainital–Udhamsingh Nagar	None	Ajay Bhatt	Bharatiya Janata Party	11 April 2019	Won
5	Haridwar	None	Ramesh Pokhriyal	Bharatiya Janata Party	11 April 2019	Won

== West Bengal ==
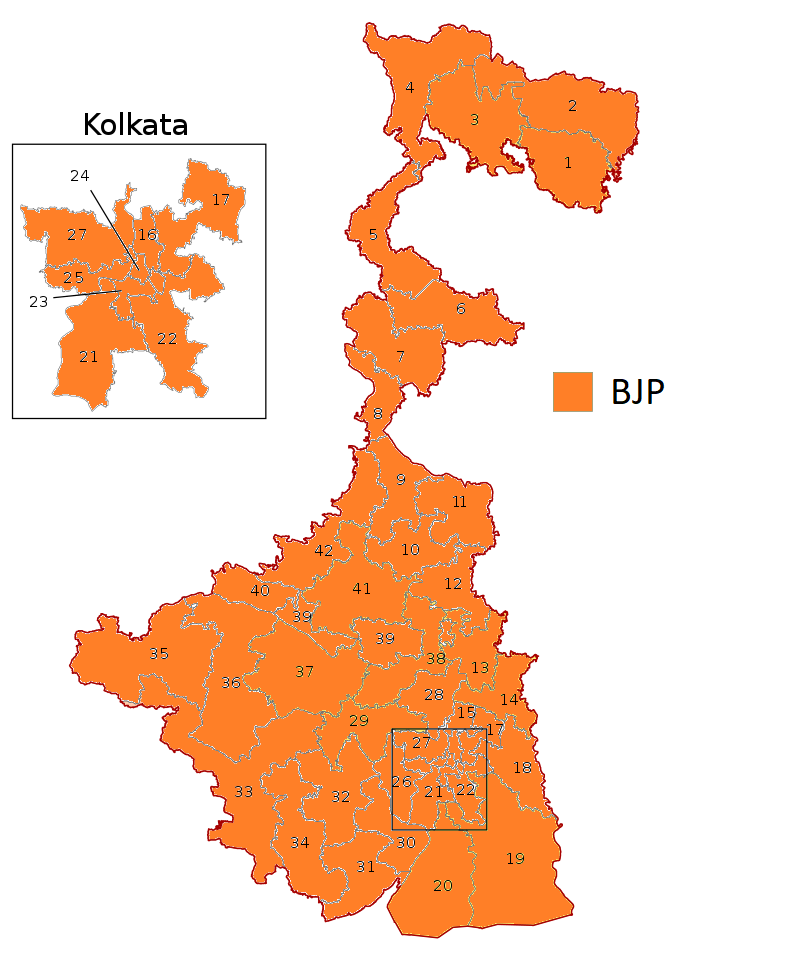
West Bengal NDA

BJP (42)

Constituency No.	Constituency	Reserved for (SC/ST/None)	Candidate	Party	Poll On	Result
1	Cooch Behar	SC	Nisith Pramanik	Bharatiya Janata Party	11 April 2019	Won
2	Alipurduars	ST	John Barla	Bharatiya Janata Party	11 April 2019	Won
3	Jalpaiguri	SC	Jayanta Ray	Bharatiya Janata Party	18 April 2019	Won
4	Darjeeling	None	Raju Singh Bisht	Bharatiya Janata Party	18 April 2019	Won
5	Raiganj	None	Deboshree Chaudhary	Bharatiya Janata Party	18 April 2019	Won
6	Balurghat	None	Sukanta Majumdar	Bharatiya Janata Party	23 April 2019	Won
7	Maldaha Uttar	None	Khagen Murmu	Bharatiya Janata Party	23 April 2019	Won
8	Maldaha Dakshin	None	Sreerupa Mitra Choudhury	Bharatiya Janata Party	23 April 2019	Lost
9	Jangipur	None	Mafuja Khatun	Bharatiya Janata Party	23 April 2019	Lost
10	Baharampur	None	Krishna Juardar Arya	Bharatiya Janata Party	29 April 2019	Lost
11	Murshidabad	None	Humayun Kabir	Bharatiya Janata Party	23 April 2019	Lost
12	Krishnanagar	None	Kalyan Choubey	Bharatiya Janata Party	29 April 2019	Lost
13	Ranaghat	SC	Jagannath Sarkar	Bharatiya Janata Party	29 April 2019	Won
14	Bangaon	SC	Shantanu Thakur	Bharatiya Janata Party	6 May 2019	Won
15	Barrackpur	None	Arjun Singh	Bharatiya Janata Party	6 May 2019	Won
16	Dum Dum	None	Samik Bhattacharya	Bharatiya Janata Party	19 May 2019	Lost
17	Barasat	None	Mrinal Kanthi Debnath	Bharatiya Janata Party	19 May 2019	Lost
18	Basirhat	None	Sayantan Basu	Bharatiya Janata Party	19 May 2019	Lost
19	Jaynagar	SC	Ashok Kandari	Bharatiya Janata Party	19 May 2019	Lost
20	Mathurapur	SC	Shyamaprasad Halder	Bharatiya Janata Party	19 May 2019	Lost
21	Diamond Harbour	None	Nilanjan Roy	Bharatiya Janata Party	19 May 2019	Lost
22	Jadavpur	None	Anupam Hazra	Bharatiya Janata Party	19 May 2019	Lost
23	Kolkata Dakshin	None	Chandra Kumar Bose	Bharatiya Janata Party	19 May 2019	Lost
24	Kolkata Uttar	None	Rahul Sinha	Bharatiya Janata Party	19 May 2019	Lost
25	Howrah	None	Rantidev Sen Gupta	Bharatiya Janata Party	6 May 2019	Lost
26	Uluberia	None	Joy Banerjee	Bharatiya Janata Party	6 May 2019	Lost
27	Srerampur	None	Debjit Sarkar	Bharatiya Janata Party	6 May 2019	Lost
28	Hooghly	None	Locket Chatterjee	Bharatiya Janata Party	6 May 2019	Won
29	Arambag	SC	Tapan Roy	Bharatiya Janata Party	6 May 2019	Lost
30	Tamluk	None	Siddharth Naskar	Bharatiya Janata Party	12 May 2019	Lost
31	Kanthi	None	Debasish Samant	Bharatiya Janata Party	12 May 2019	Lost
32	Ghatal	None	Bharati Ghosh	Bharatiya Janata Party	12 May 2019	Lost
33	Jhargram	ST	Kunar Hembram	Bharatiya Janata Party	12 May 2019	Won
34	Medinipur	None	Dilip Ghosh	Bharatiya Janata Party	12 May 2019	Won
35	Purulia	None	Jyotirmoy Singh Mahato	Bharatiya Janata Party	12 May 2019	Won
36	Bankura	None	Subhash Sarkar	Bharatiya Janata Party	12 May 2019	Won
37	Bishnupur	SC	Saumitra Khan	Bharatiya Janata Party	12 May 2019	Won
38	Bardhaman Purba	SC	Paresh Chandra Das	Bharatiya Janata Party	29 April 2019	Lost
39	Bardhaman–Durgapur	None	S. S. Ahluwalia	Bharatiya Janata Party	29 April 2019	Won
40	Asansol	None	Babul Supriyo	Bharatiya Janata Party	29 April 2019	Won
41	Bolpur	SC	Ram Prashad Das	Bharatiya Janata Party	29 April 2019	Lost
42	Birbhum	None	Dudh Kumar Mondal	Bharatiya Janata Party	29 April 2019	Lost

== Andaman and Nicobar Islands ==
BJP (1)

Constituency No.	Constituency	Reserved for (SC/ST/None)	Candidate	Party	Poll On	Result
1	Andaman and Nicobar Islands	None	Vishal Jolly	Bharatiya Janata Party	11 April 2019	Lost

== Chandigarh ==
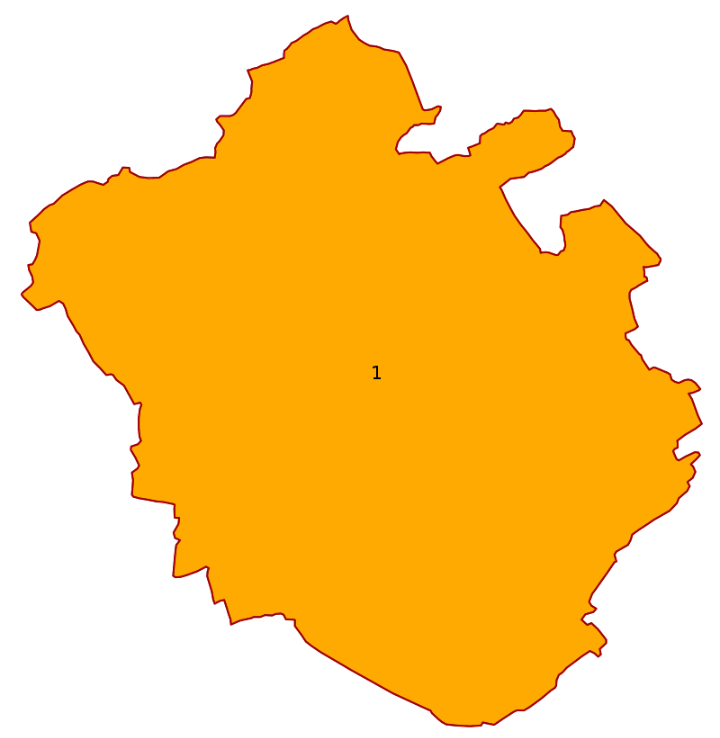

BJP (1)

Constituency No.	Constituency	Reserved for (SC/ST/None)	Candidate	Party	Poll On	Result
1	Chandigarh	None	Kirron Kher	Bharatiya Janata Party	19 May 2019	Won

== Dadra and Nagar Haveli ==
BJP (1)

Constituency No.	Constituency	Reserved for (SC/ST/None)	Candidate	Party	Poll On	Result
1	Dadra and Nagar Haveli	ST	Natubhai Gomanbhai Patel	Bharatiya Janata Party	23 April 2019	Lost

== Daman and Diu ==
BJP (1)

Constituency No.	Constituency	Reserved for (SC/ST/None)	Candidate	Party	Poll On	Result
1	Daman and Diu	None	Lalubhai Patel	Bharatiya Janata Party	23 April 2019	Won

== Lakshadweep ==
BJP (1)

Constituency No.	Constituency	Reserved for (SC/ST/None)	Candidate	Party	Poll On	Result
1	Lakshadweep	ST	Abdul Khader	Bharatiya Janata Party	11 April 2019	Lost

== NCT of Delhi ==
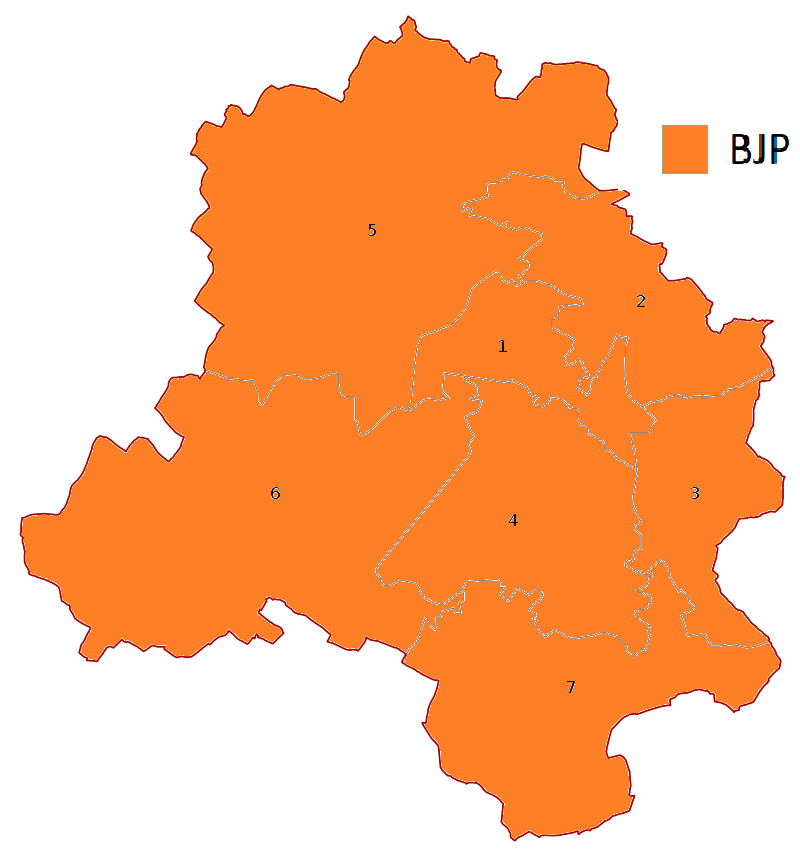
Delhi NDA

BJP (7)

Constituency No.	Constituency	Reserved for (SC/ST/None)	Candidate	Party	Poll On	Result
1	Chandni Chowk	None	Dr. Harsh Vardhan	Bharatiya Janata Party	12 May 2019	Won
2	North East Delhi	None	Manoj Tiwari	Bharatiya Janata Party	12 May 2019	Won
3	East Delhi	None	Gautam Gambhir	Bharatiya Janata Party	12 May 2019	Won
4	New Delhi	None	Meenakshi Lekhi	Bharatiya Janata Party	12 May 2019	Won
5	North West Delhi	SC	Hans Raj Hans	Bharatiya Janata Party	12 May 2019	Won
6	West Delhi	None	Parvesh Verma	Bharatiya Janata Party	12 May 2019	Won
7	South Delhi	None	Ramesh Bidhuri	Bharatiya Janata Party	12 May 2019	Won

== Puducherry ==
AINRC (1)

Constituency No.	Constituency	Reserved for (SC/ST/None)	Candidate	Party	Poll On	Result
1	Puducherry	None	K. Narayanasamy	All India N.R. Congress	18 April 2019	Lost

== See also ==
List of National Democratic Alliance candidates in the 1998 Indian general election
List of National Democratic Alliance candidates in the 1999 Indian general election
List of National Democratic Alliance candidates in the 2004 Indian general election
List of National Democratic Alliance candidates in the 2009 Indian general election
List of National Democratic Alliance candidates in the 2014 Indian general election
List of National Democratic Alliance candidates in the 2019 Indian general election
List of National Democratic Alliance candidates in the 2024 Indian general election

- List of United Progressive Alliance candidates in the 2019 Indian general election
- List of Left Front candidates in the 2019 Indian general election
- Bharatiya Janata Party campaign for the 2019 Indian general election
