= V. S. Ugrappa =

Indian politician

Member of Parliament, Lok Sabha
- In office 6 November 2018 – 23 May 2019
- Preceded by: B. Sreeramulu
- Succeeded by: Y. Devendrappa
- Constituency: Bellary

Member of Karnataka Legislative Council
- In office 24 June 2014 – 6 November 2018
- Constituency: Nominated by Governor
- In office 2004–2010
- Constituency: Local Authorities Constituency
- In office 1995–1998

Personal details
- Born: 3 June 1954 (age 71)
- Party: Indian National Congress
- Spouse: Dr K. V. Manjula
- Children: 1 son, 1 daughter
- Profession: Agriculturist, lawyer

V. S. Ugrappa is an Indian politician and former member of parliament from Bellary constituency in Karnataka. He lost in the 2019 Indian general election to Devendrappa. A member of the Indian National Congress, he was elected in a bypoll in November 2018. He defeated the Bharatiya Janata Party candidate J. Shantha by 2.1 lakh votes. He lost in 2019 by 25,707 votes to BJP leader Y. Devendrappa.

He was born in Venkatapura of Pavagada taluk.

Ugrappa was previously a member of the Karnataka Legislative Council.
