= Devendrappa =

Politician from Karnataka, India

Member of Parliament, Lok Sabha
- In office 18 June 2019 – 4 June 2024
- Preceded by: V. S. Ugrappa
- Constituency: Ballari

Personal details
- Born: 7 May 1951 (age 74) Arsikeri, Harapanahalli taluk, Bellary district, Madras State (Now Karnataka)
- Party: Bharatiya Janata Party

Yarabasi Devendrappa is an Indian politician who served as the Member of Parliament, Lok Sabha from Bellary, Karnataka from 2019 to 2024. He won 2019 Indian general election as member of the Bharatiya Janata Party.

== Early life ==
Devendrappa was born in Arasikere, Ballari, Karnataka.

== Political career ==
Devendrappa was originally a member of Congress, and unsuccessfully contested from Jagalur in 2010. He was named as a potential Congress candidate during bypolls for the Ballari MP seat in 2018. Devendrappa is a relative and loyalist of Ramesh Jarkiholi, who, at the time was a Congress rebel and closet BJP supporter. He was chosen as BJP nominee because of this, and because he was approved by B Sriramulu, a Ballari BJP strongman, and was supported by Ramesh Jarkiholi. In the 2019 polls, after being denied the Congress ticket, he defeated V. S. Ugrappa to win the Ballari seat for the BJP.
