= Hariom Singh Rathore =

Indian politician (1957–2019)

Member of Parliament, Lok Sabha
- In office 2014–2019
- Preceded by: Gopal Singh Shekhawat
- Succeeded by: Diya Kumari
- Constituency: Rajsamand

Personal details
- Born: 9 August 1957 Kelwa, Rajsamand, Rajasthan
- Died: 27 May 2019 (aged 61) Udaipur, Rajasthan
- Party: Bharatiya Janata Party
- Spouse: Praveena Hada
- Children: shiva rathore and kv rathore
- Education: Bhupal Noble's College
- Occupation: Agriculturist

Hariom Singh Rathore (9 August 1957 – 27 May 2019) was an Indian politician and a member of parliament in the 16th Lok Sabha from Rajsamand constituency of Rajasthan. He won the constituency in the 2014 Indian general election, as a Bharatiya Janata Party candidate.

Rathore was born on 9 August 1957 at Kelwa, Rajsamand, Rajasthan. His parents were Fateh Singh Rathore and Govind Kunwar. The possessor of a B.Com. degree, he attended Bhupal Nobles College in Udaipur and later became an agriculturalist. He married Praveena Hada on 23 November 1980 and had both a son and a daughter. He was elected to the Parliament of India in May 2014. He died on 27 May 2019.
