= Rajsamand Lok Sabha constituency =

Lok Sabha constituency in Rajasthan

Coordinates: 25.1°N 73.9°E

Rajsamand
- Lok Sabha constituency
- Interactive Map Outlining Rajsamand Lok Sabha Constituency

Constituency details
- Country: India
- Region: North India
- State: Rajasthan
- Assembly constituencies: Beawar; Merta; Degana; Jaitaran; Bhim; Kumbhalgarh; Rajsamand; Nathdwara
- Established: 2008
- Reservation: None

Member of Parliament
- 18th Lok Sabha
- Incumbent Mahima Kumari Mewar
- Party: Bharatiya Janata Party
- Elected year: 2024

Rajsamand (Hindi pronunciation: [ɾaːd͡ʒ.səmən̪d̪]) is one of the 25 Lok Sabha (parliamentary) constituencies in Rajasthan state in western India. This constituency came into existence in 2008 as a part of the implementation of delimitation of parliamentary constituencies, based on the recommendations of the Delimitation Commission of India constituted in 2002.

== Vidhan Sabha segments ==
Presently, Rajsamand Lok Sabha constituency comprises eight Vidhan Sabha (legislative assembly) segments. These are:

#	Name	District	Member	Party	2024 Lead
103	Beawar	Beawar	Shankar Singh Rawat	BJP	BJP
111	Merta (SC)	Nagaur	Laxmanram Meghwal	BJP	INC
112	Degana	Nagaur	Ajay Singh Kilak	BJP	BJP
116	Jaitaran	Pali	Avinash Gehlot	BJP	BJP
173	Bhim	Rajsamand	Harisingh Rawat	BJP	BJP
174	Kumbhalgarh	Rajsamand	Surendra Singh Rathore	BJP	BJP
175	Rajsamand	Rajsamand	Deepti Maheshwari	BJP	BJP
176	Nathdwara	Rajsamand	Vishvaraj Singh Mewar	BJP	BJP

Four assembly segments - Bhim, Kumbhalgarh, Rajsamand and Nathdwara were earlier in erstwhile Udaipur constituency. Two assembly segments - Merta and Degana were earlier in erstwhile Nagaur constituency. Beawar and Jaitaran assembly segments were earlier in erstwhile Ajmer and Pali constituencies respectively.

== Members of Parliament ==
Year	Member	Party
Till 2009 : Constituency did not exist
2009	Gopal Singh Shekhawat	Indian National Congress
2014	Hariom Singh Rathore	Bharatiya Janata Party
2019	Diya Kumari	Bharatiya Janata Party
2024	Mahima Kumari Mewar	Bharatiya Janata Party

Vote share of winning candidates
2024	64.40%
2019	69.61%
2014	65.65%
2009	49.77%

== Election results ==
=== 2024 ===
2024 Indian general election: Rajsamand
Party	Candidate	Votes	%	±%
BJP	Mahima Kumari Mewar	781,203	64.4	
INC	Damodar Gurjar	3,88,980	32.06	
NOTA	None of the above	1,2411	1.02	
Majority		3,92,223	32.33	
Turnout		12,13,130	58.39	
BJP hold		Swing		

=== 2019 ===
2019 Indian general elections: Rajsamand
Party	Candidate	Votes	%	±%
BJP	Diya Kumari	863,039	69.61	
INC	Devkinandan (Kaka)	3,11,123	25.09	
BSP	Chenaram	15,955	1.29	
API	Chandra Prakash Tanwar	12,887	1.04	
NOTA	None of the above	12,671	1.02	
Majority		5,51,916	44.52	
Turnout		12,40,848	64.87	+7.09
BJP hold		Swing		

=== 2014 Lok Sabha Election ===
2014 Indian general elections: Rajsamand
Party	Candidate	Votes	%	±%
BJP	Hari Om Singh Rathore	6,44,794	65.65	
INC	Gopal Singh Shekhawat	2,49,089	25.36	
NOTA	None of the above	17,182	1.75	
BSP	Neeru Ram Jat	14,579	1.48	
Majority		3,95,705	40.29	
Turnout		9,83,032	57.78	
BJP gain from INC		Swing		

=== 2009 Lok Sabha Election ===
2009 Indian general elections: Rajsamand
Party	Candidate	Votes	%	±%
INC	Gopal Singh Shekhawat	2,94,451	49.77	
BJP	Rasa Singh Rawat	2,48,561	42.01	
IND.	Surya Bhavani Singh Chawra	13,746	2.32	
BSP	Neeru Ram Jat	12,441	2.10	
Majority		45,890	7.77	
Turnout		5,90,981	39.68	
INC win (new seat)				

== See also ==
- Rajsamand district
- List of constituencies of the Lok Sabha
