= List of National Democratic Alliance candidates in the 2024 Indian general election =

This is a list of National Democratic Alliance candidates in the 2024 Indian general election.

2024 NDA Alliance Lok Sabha Seat Sharing

== Seat sharing summary ==
Party	State/UT	Seats contested		Seats won	
Bharatiya Janata Party	Uttar Pradesh	75	441	33	240
Bharatiya Janata Party	West Bengal	42	441	12	240
Bharatiya Janata Party	Madhya Pradesh	29	441	29	240
Bharatiya Janata Party	Maharashtra	28	441	9	240
Bharatiya Janata Party	Gujarat	26	441	25	240
Bharatiya Janata Party	Karnataka	25	441	17	240
Bharatiya Janata Party	Rajasthan	25	441	14	240
Bharatiya Janata Party	Tamil Nadu	23	441	0	240
Bharatiya Janata Party	Odisha	21	441	20	240
Bharatiya Janata Party	Bihar	17	441	12	240
Bharatiya Janata Party	Telangana	17	441	8	240
Bharatiya Janata Party	Kerala	16	441	1	240
Bharatiya Janata Party	Jharkhand	13	441	8	240
Bharatiya Janata Party	Punjab	13	441	0	240
Bharatiya Janata Party	Assam	11	441	9	240
Bharatiya Janata Party	Chhattisgarh	11	441	10	240
Bharatiya Janata Party	Haryana	10	441	5	240
Bharatiya Janata Party	Delhi	7	441	7	240
Bharatiya Janata Party	Andhra Pradesh	6	441	3	240
Bharatiya Janata Party	Uttarakhand	5	441	5	240
Bharatiya Janata Party	Himachal Pradesh	4	441	4	240
Bharatiya Janata Party	Arunachal Pradesh	2	441	2	240
Bharatiya Janata Party	Dadra and Nagar Haveli and Daman and Diu	2	441	1	240
Bharatiya Janata Party	Goa	2	441	1	240
Bharatiya Janata Party	Jammu and Kashmir	2	441	2	240
Bharatiya Janata Party	Tripura	2	441	2	240
Bharatiya Janata Party	Andaman and Nicobar Islands	1	441	1	240
Bharatiya Janata Party	Chandigarh	1	441	0	240
Bharatiya Janata Party	Ladakh	1	441	0	240
Bharatiya Janata Party	Manipur	1	441	0	240
Bharatiya Janata Party	Mizoram	1	441	0	240
Bharatiya Janata Party	Puducherry	1	441	0	240
Bharatiya Janata Party	Sikkim	1	441	0	240
Telugu Desam Party	Andhra Pradesh	17		16	
Janata Dal (United)	Bihar	16		12	
Shiv Sena	Maharashtra	15		7	
Pattali Makkal Katchi	Tamil Nadu	10		0	
Lok Janshakti Party (Ram Vilas)	Bihar	5		5	
Nationalist Congress Party	Maharashtra	4	5	1	1
Nationalist Congress Party	Lakshadweep	1	5	0	1
Bharath Dharma Jana Sena	Kerala	4		0	
Janata Dal (Secular)	Karnataka	3		2	
Tamil Maanila Congress (Moopanar)	Tamil Nadu	3		0	
Amma Makkal Munnetra Kazhagam	Tamil Nadu	2		0	
Apna Dal (Soneylal)	Uttar Pradesh	2		1	
Asom Gana Parishad	Assam	2		1	
Jana Sena Party	Andhra Pradesh	2		2	
National People's Party	Meghalaya	2		0	
Rashtriya Lok Dal	Uttar Pradesh	2		2	
All Jharkhand Students Union	Jharkhand	1		1	
Hindustani Awam Morcha	Bihar	1		1	
Naga People's Front	Manipur	1		0	
Nationalist Democratic Progressive Party	Nagaland	1		0	
Sikkim Krantikari Morcha	Sikkim	1		1	
Rashtriya Lok Morcha	Bihar	1		0	
Rashtriya Samaj Paksha	Maharashtra	1		0	
Suheldev Bharatiya Samaj Party	Uttar Pradesh	1		0	
United People's Party Liberal	Assam	1		1	
Independent	Tamil Nadu	1		0	
Total		541		293	

== Andaman and Nicobar Islands ==
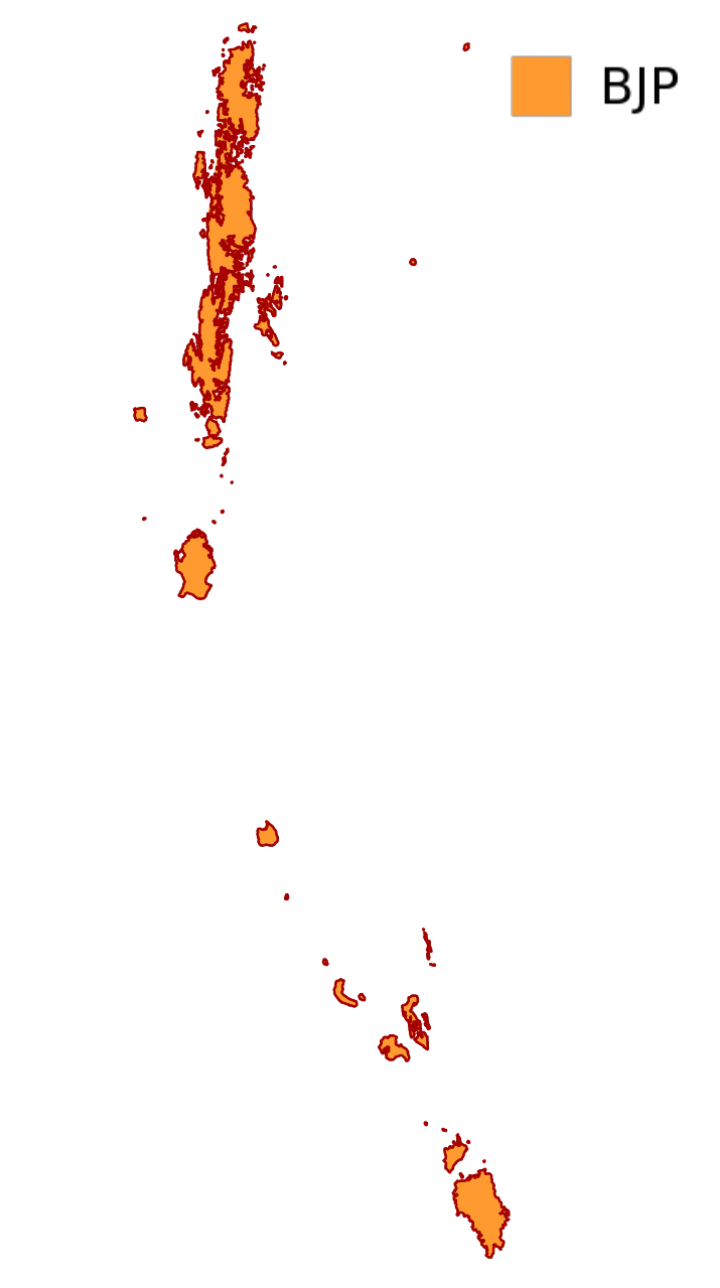

BJP (1)

Constituency		Poll On	Candidate		Result
1	Andaman and Nicobar Islands	19 April 2024	Bishnu Pada Ray	BJP	Won

== Andhra Pradesh ==

TDP (17)
BJP (6)
JSP (2)

Constituency		Poll On	Candidate		Result
1	Araku (ST)	13 May 2024	Kothapalli Geetha	BJP	Lost
2	Srikakulam	13 May 2024	Kinjarapu Ram Mohan Naidu	TDP	Won
3	Vizianagaram	13 May 2024	Kalisetty Appala Naidu	TDP	Won
4	Visakhapatnam	13 May 2024	Mathukumilli Bharat	TDP	Won
5	Anakapalli	13 May 2024	C. M. Ramesh	BJP	Won
6	Kakinada	13 May 2024	Tangella Uday Srinivas	JSP	Won
7	Amalapuram (SC)	13 May 2024	Ganti Harish Madhur	TDP	Won
8	Rajahmundry	13 May 2024	Daggubati Purandeswari	BJP	Won
9	Narasapuram	13 May 2024	Bhupathi Raju Srinivasa Varma	BJP	Won
10	Eluru	13 May 2024	Putta Mahesh Kumar	TDP	Won
11	Machilipatnam	13 May 2024	Vallabhaneni Balashowry	JSP	Won
12	Vijayawada	13 May 2024	Kesineni Sivanath	TDP	Won
13	Guntur	13 May 2024	Chandra Sekhar Pemmasani	TDP	Won
14	Narasaraopet	13 May 2024	Lavu Sri Krishna Devarayalu	TDP	Won
15	Bapatla (SC)	13 May 2024	Krishna Prasad Tenneti	TDP	Won
16	Ongole	13 May 2024	Magunta Sreenivasulu Reddy	TDP	Won
17	Nandyal	13 May 2024	Byreddy Shabari	TDP	Won
18	Kurnool	13 May 2024	Bastipati Nagaraju Panchalingala	TDP	Won
19	Anantapur	13 May 2024	Ambica G Lakshminarayana Valmiki	TDP	Won
20	Hindupur	13 May 2024	B. K. Parthasarathi	TDP	Won
21	Kadapa	13 May 2024	Chadipiralla Bhupesh Reddy	TDP	Lost
22	Nellore	13 May 2024	Vemireddy Prabhakar Reddy	TDP	Won
23	Tirupati (SC)	13 May 2024	Velagapalli Varaprasad Rao	BJP	Lost
24	Rajampet	13 May 2024	Kiran Kumar Reddy	BJP	Lost
25	Chittoor (SC)	13 May 2024	Daggumalla Prasada Rao	TDP	Won

== Arunachal Pradesh ==
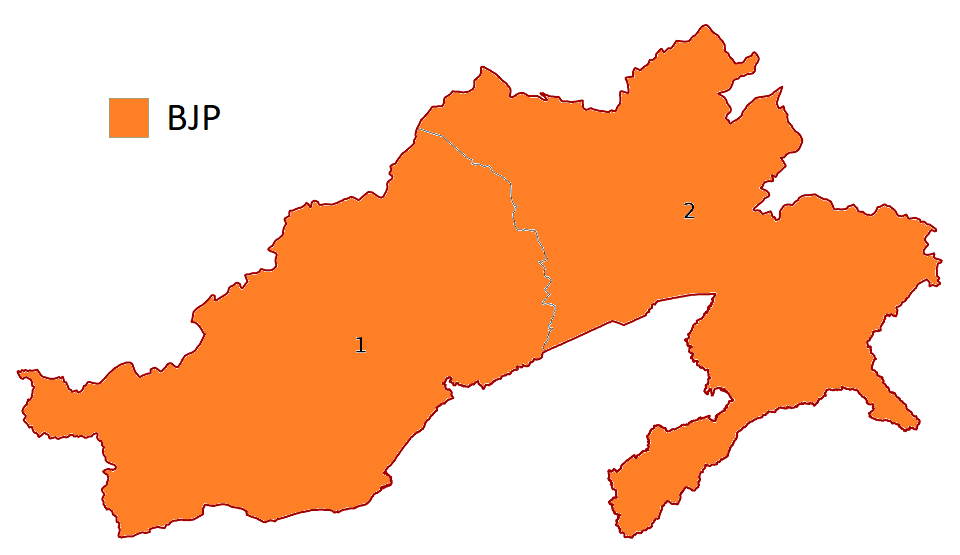
Arunachal Pradesh NDA

BJP (2)

Constituency		Poll On	Candidate		Result
1	Arunachal West	19 April 2024	Kiren Rijiju	BJP	Won
2	Arunachal East	19 April 2024	Tapir Gao	BJP	Won

== Assam ==
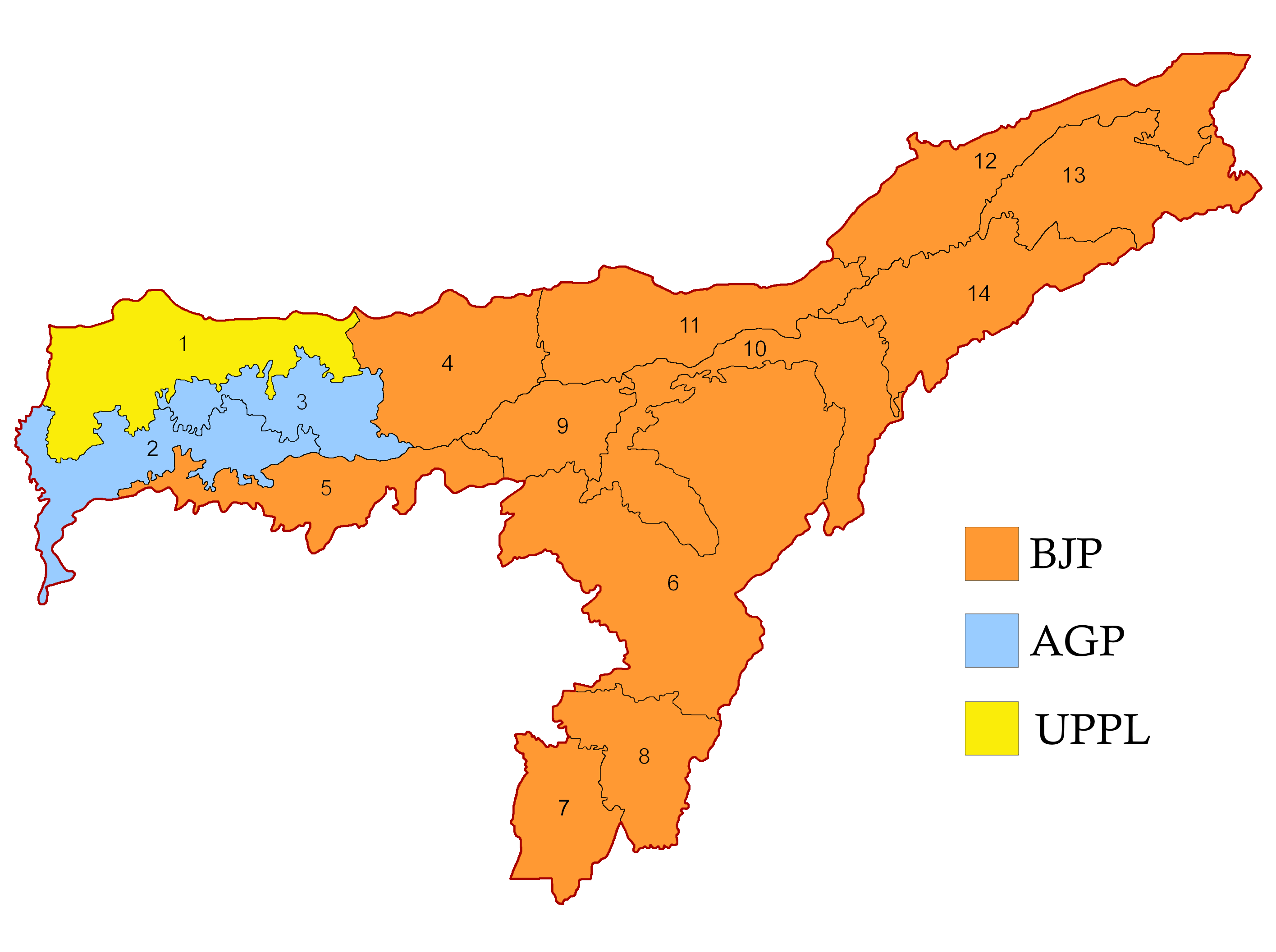
2024 NDA Alliance Lok Sabha Seat Sharing Assam

BJP (11)
AGP (2)
UPPL (1)

Constituency		Poll On	Candidate		Result
1	Kokrajhar (ST)	7 May 2024	Joyanta Basumatary	UPPL	Won
2	Dhubri	7 May 2024	Zabed Islam	AGP	Lost
3	Barpeta	7 May 2024	Phani Bhusan Choudhury	AGP	Won
4	Darrang–Udalguri	26 April 2024	Dilip Saikia	BJP	Won
5	Guwahati	7 May 2024	Bijuli Kalita Medhi	BJP	Won
6	Diphu (ST)	26 April 2024	Amarsing Tisso	BJP	Won
7	Karimganj	26 April 2024	Kripanath Mallah	BJP	Won
8	Silchar (SC)	26 April 2024	Parimal Suklabaidya	BJP	Won
9	Nagaon	26 April 2024	Suresh Bora	BJP	Lost
10	Kaziranga	19 April 2024	Kamakhya Prasad Tasa	BJP	Won
11	Sonitpur	19 April 2024	Ranjit Dutta	BJP	Won
12	Lakhimpur	19 April 2024	Pradan Baruah	BJP	Won
13	Dibrugarh	19 April 2024	Sarbananda Sonowal	BJP	Won
14	Jorhat	19 April 2024	Topon Kumar Gogoi	BJP	Lost

== Bihar ==
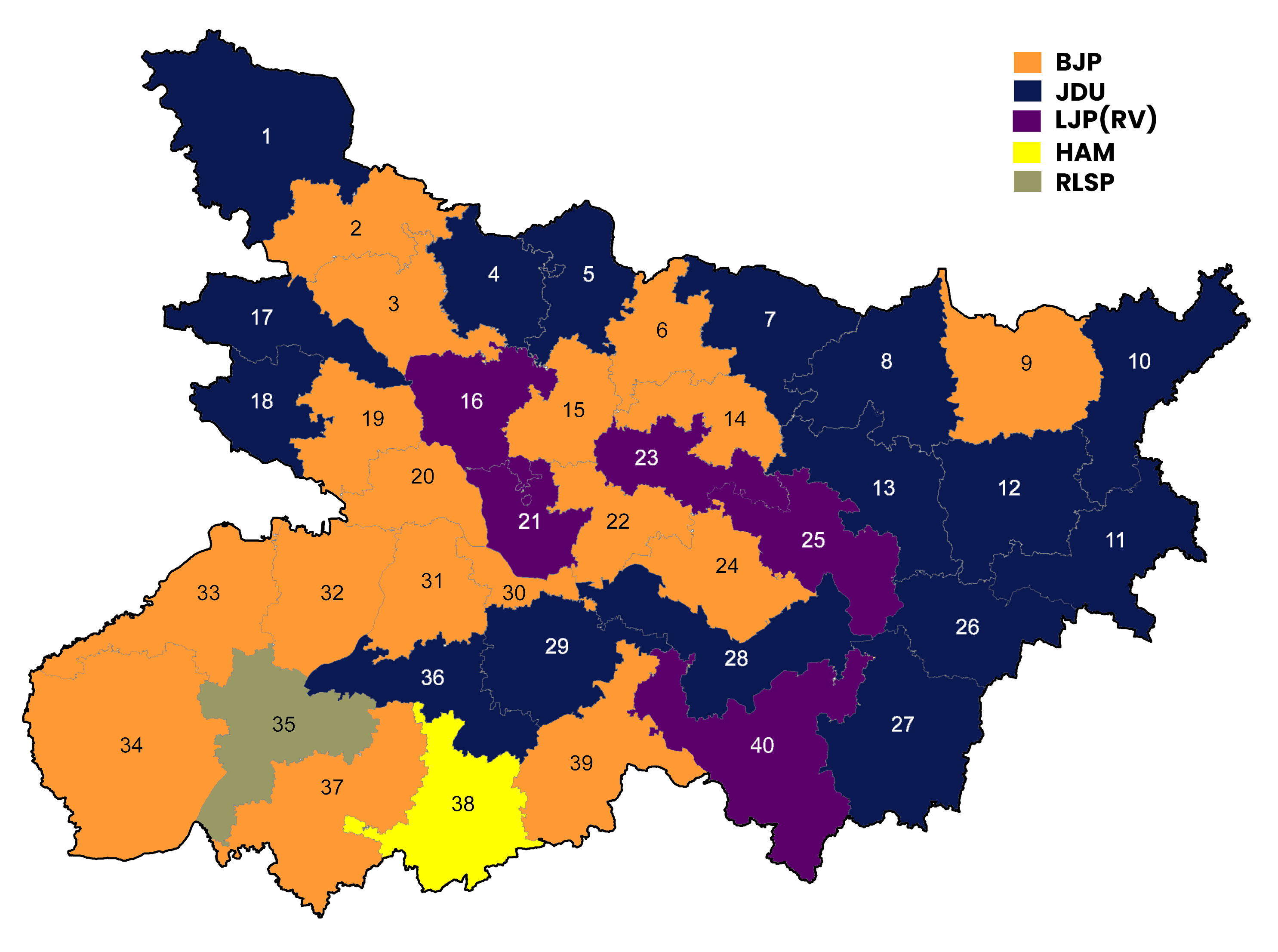
2024 Lok Sabha NDA Seat Sharing in Bihar

BJP (17)
JD(U) (16)
LJP(RV) (5)
HAM(S) (1)
RLM (1)

Constituency		Poll On	Candidate		Result
1	Valmiki Nagar	25 May 2024	Sunil Kumar Kushwaha	JD(U)	Won
2	Paschim Champaran	25 May 2024	Sanjay Jaiswal	BJP	Won
3	Purvi Champaran	25 May 2024	Radha Mohan Singh	BJP	Won
4	Sheohar	25 May 2024	Lovely Anand	JD(U)	Won
5	Sitamarhi	20 May 2024	Devesh Chandra Thakur	JD(U)	Won
6	Madhubani	20 May 2024	Ashok Kumar Yadav	BJP	Won
7	Jhanjharpur	7 May 2024	Ramprit Mandal	JD(U)	Won
8	Supaul	7 May 2024	Dileshwar Kamait	JD(U)	Won
9	Araria	7 May 2024	Pradeep Kumar Singh	BJP	Won
10	Kishanganj	26 April 2024	Mujahid Alam	JD(U)	Lost
11	Katihar	26 April 2024	Dulal Chandra Goswami	JD(U)	Lost
12	Purnia	26 April 2024	Santosh Kumar Kushwaha	JD(U)	Lost
13	Madhepura	7 May 2024	Dinesh Chandra Yadav	JD(U)	Won
14	Darbhanga	13 May 2024	Gopal Jee Thakur	BJP	Won
15	Muzaffarpur	20 May 2024	Raj Bhusan Nishad	BJP	Won
16	Vaishali	25 May 2024	Veena Devi	LJP(RV)	Won
17	Gopalganj (SC)	25 May 2024	Alok Kumar Suman	JD(U)	Won
18	Siwan	25 May 2024	Vijayalakshmi Devi Kushwaha	JD(U)	Won
19	Maharajganj	25 May 2024	Janardan Singh Sigriwal	BJP	Won
20	Saran	20 May 2024	Rajiv Pratap Rudy	BJP	Won
21	Hajipur (SC)	20 May 2024	Chirag Paswan	LJP(RV)	Won
22	Ujiarpur	13 May 2024	Nityanand Rai	BJP	Won
23	Samastipur (SC)	13 May 2024	Shambhavi Chaudhary	LJP(RV)	Won
24	Begusarai	13 May 2024	Giriraj Singh	BJP	Won
25	Khagaria	7 May 2024	Rajesh Verma	LJP(RV)	Won
26	Bhagalpur	26 April 2024	Ajay Kumar Mandal	JD(U)	Won
27	Banka	26 April 2024	Giridhari Yadav	JD(U)	Won
28	Munger	13 May 2024	Lalan Singh	JD(U)	Won
29	Nalanda	1 June 2024	Kaushalendra Kumar	JD(U)	Won
30	Patna Sahib	1 June 2024	Ravi Shankar Prasad	BJP	Won
31	Pataliputra	1 June 2024	Ram Kripal Yadav	BJP	Lost
32	Arrah	1 June 2024	R. K. Singh	BJP	Lost
33	Buxar	1 June 2024	Mithlesh Tiwari	BJP	Lost
34	Sasaram (SC)	1 June 2024	Shivesh Ram	BJP	Lost
35	Karakat	1 June 2024	Upendra Kushwaha	RLM	Lost
36	Jahanabad	1 June 2024	Chandeshwar Prasad	JD(U)	Lost
37	Aurangabad	19 April 2024	Sushil Kumar Singh	BJP	Lost
38	Gaya (SC)	19 April 2024	Jitan Ram Manjhi	HAM(S)	Won
39	Nawada	19 April 2024	Vivek Thakur	BJP	Won
40	Jamui (SC)	19 April 2024	Arun Bharti	LJP(RV)	Won

== Chandigarh ==
2024 Lok Sabha Chandigarh NDA

BJP (1)

Constituency		Poll On	Candidate		Result
1	Chandigarh	1 June 2024	Sanjay Tandon	BJP	Lost

== Chhattisgarh ==
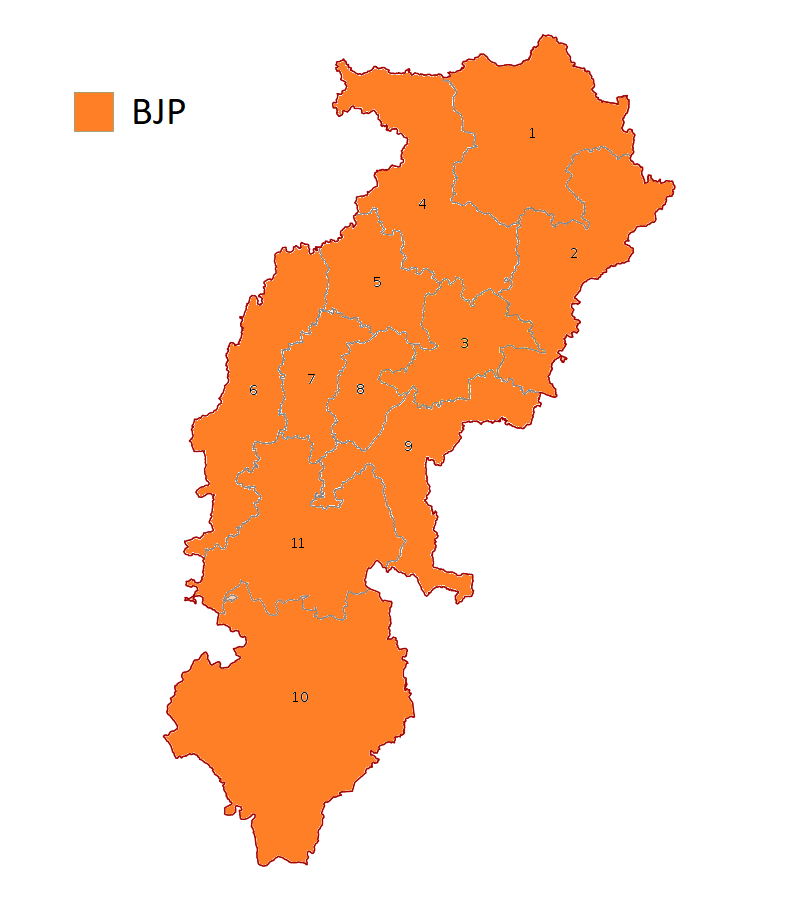
Chhattisgarh NDA

BJP (11)

Constituency		Poll On	Candidate		Result
1	Sarguja (ST)	7 May 2024	Chintamani Maharaj	BJP	Won
2	Raigarh (ST)	7 May 2024	Radheshyam Rathiya	BJP	Won
3	Janjgir-Champa (SC)	7 May 2024	Kamlesh Jangde	BJP	Won
4	Korba	7 May 2024	Saroj Pandey	BJP	Lost
5	Bilaspur	7 May 2024	Tokhan Sahu	BJP	Won
6	Rajnandgaon	26 April 2024	Santosh Pandey	BJP	Won
7	Durg	7 May 2024	Vijay Baghel	BJP	Won
8	Raipur	7 May 2024	Brijmohan Agrawal	BJP	Won
9	Mahasamund	26 April 2024	Rupkumari Choudhary	BJP	Won
10	Bastar (ST)	19 April 2024	Mahesh Kashyap	BJP	Won
11	Kanker (ST)	26 April 2024	Bhojraj Nag	BJP	Won

== Dadra and Nagar Haveli and Daman and Diu ==
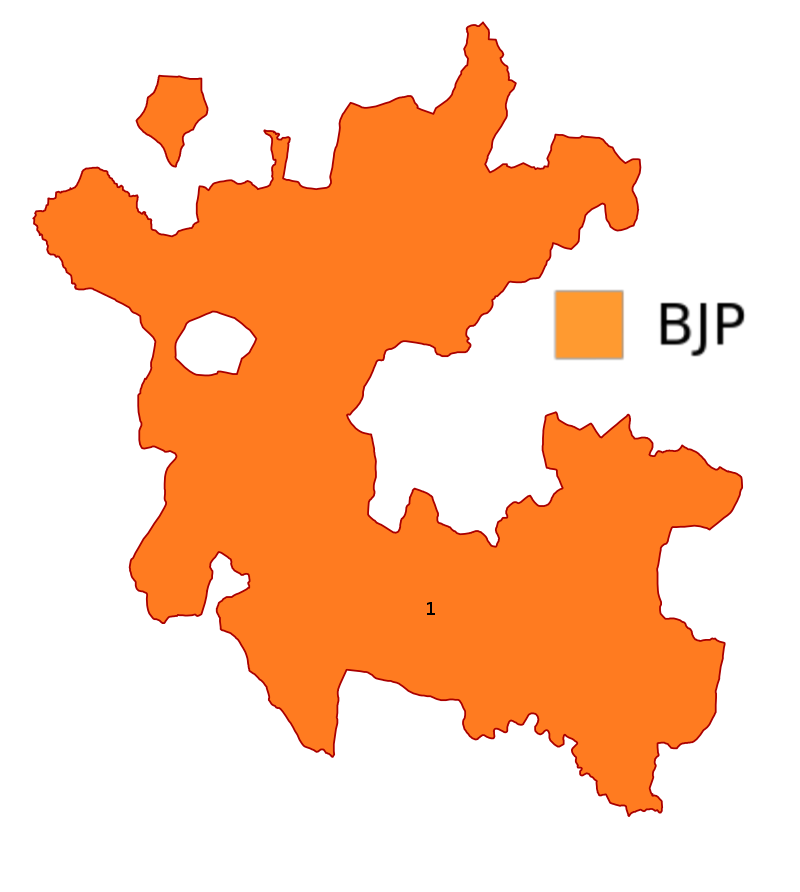

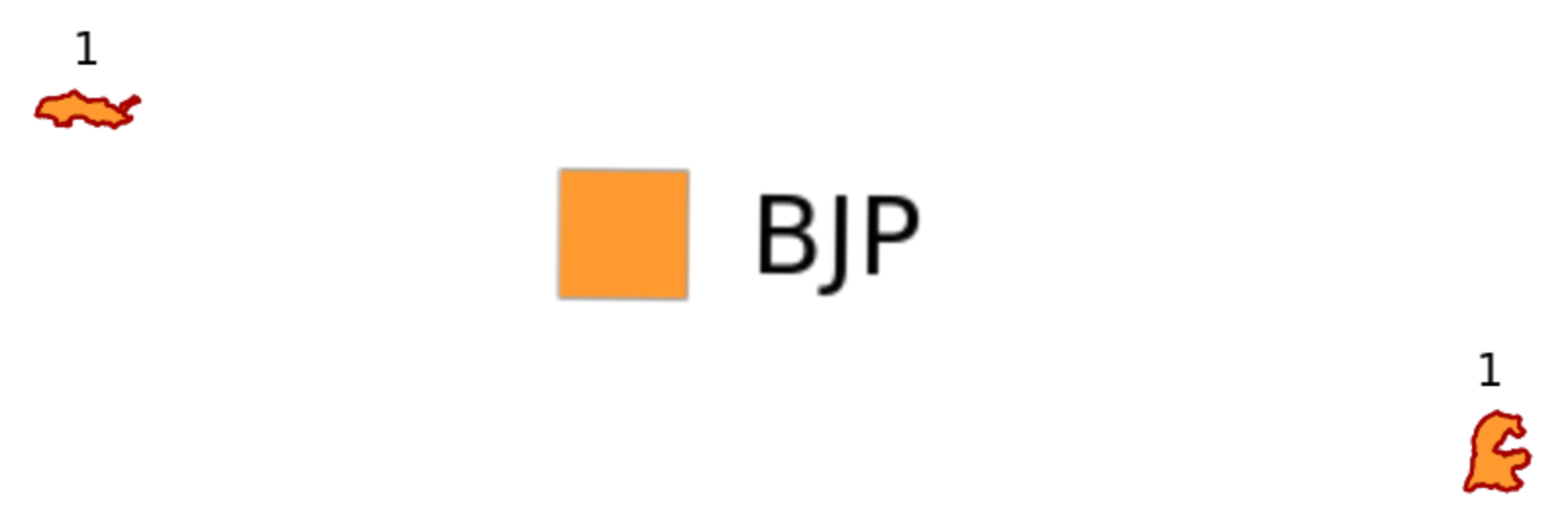

BJP (2)

Constituency		Poll On	Candidate		Result
1	Dadra and Nagar Haveli (ST)	7 May 2024	Kalaben Delkar	BJP	Won
2	Daman and Diu	7 May 2024	Lalubhai Patel	BJP	Lost

== Delhi ==
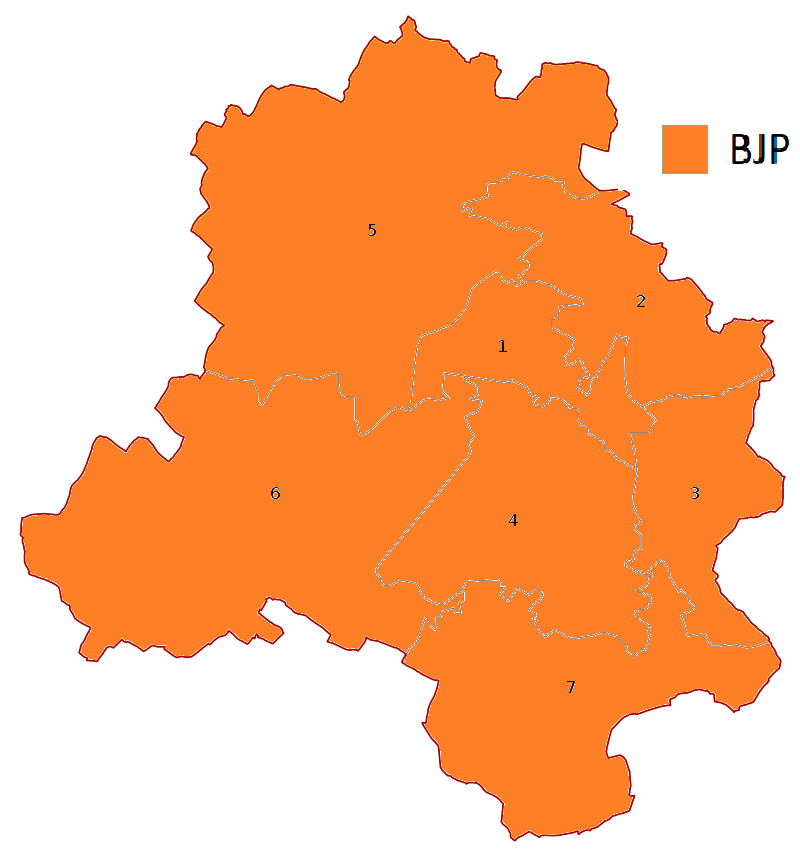
Delhi NDA

BJP (7)

Constituency		Poll On	Candidate		Result
1	Chandni Chowk	25 May 2024	Praveen Khandelwal	BJP	Won
2	North East Delhi	25 May 2024	Manoj Tiwari	BJP	Won
3	East Delhi	25 May 2024	Harsh Malhotra	BJP	Won
4	New Delhi	25 May 2024	Bansuri Swaraj	BJP	Won
5	North West Delhi (SC)	25 May 2024	Yogender Chandoliya	BJP	Won
6	West Delhi	25 May 2024	Kamaljeet Sehrawat	BJP	Won
7	South Delhi	25 May 2024	Ramvir Singh Bidhuri	BJP	Won

== Goa ==
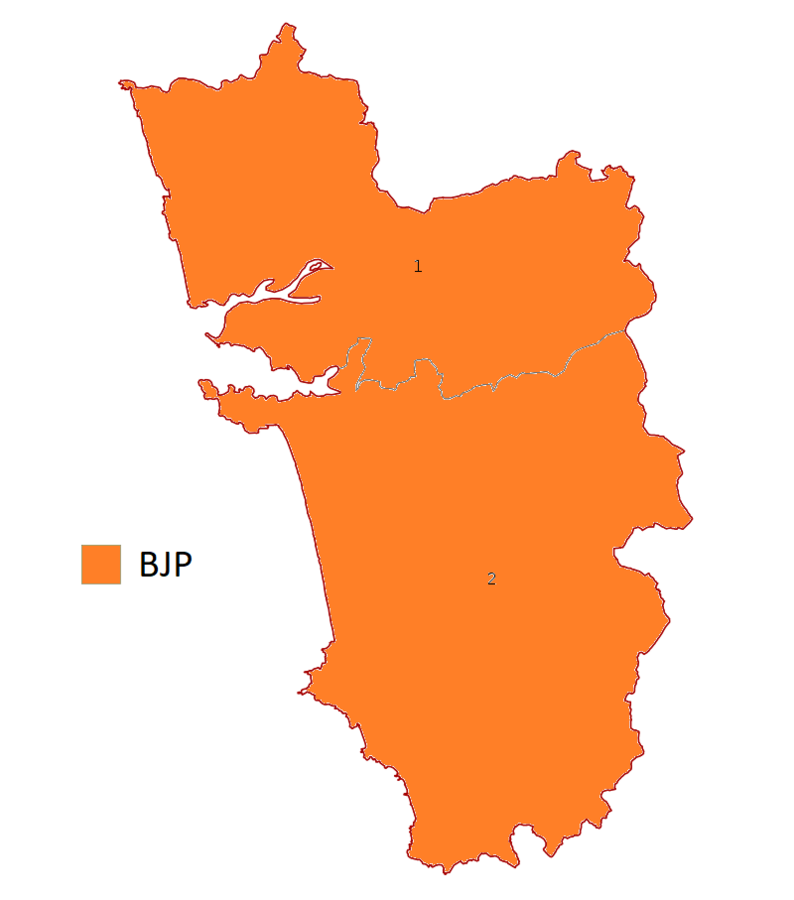

BJP (2)

Constituency		Poll On	Candidate		Result
1	North Goa	7 May 2024	Shripad Naik	BJP	Won
2	South Goa	7 May 2024	Pallavi Srinivas Dempo	BJP	Lost

== Gujarat ==
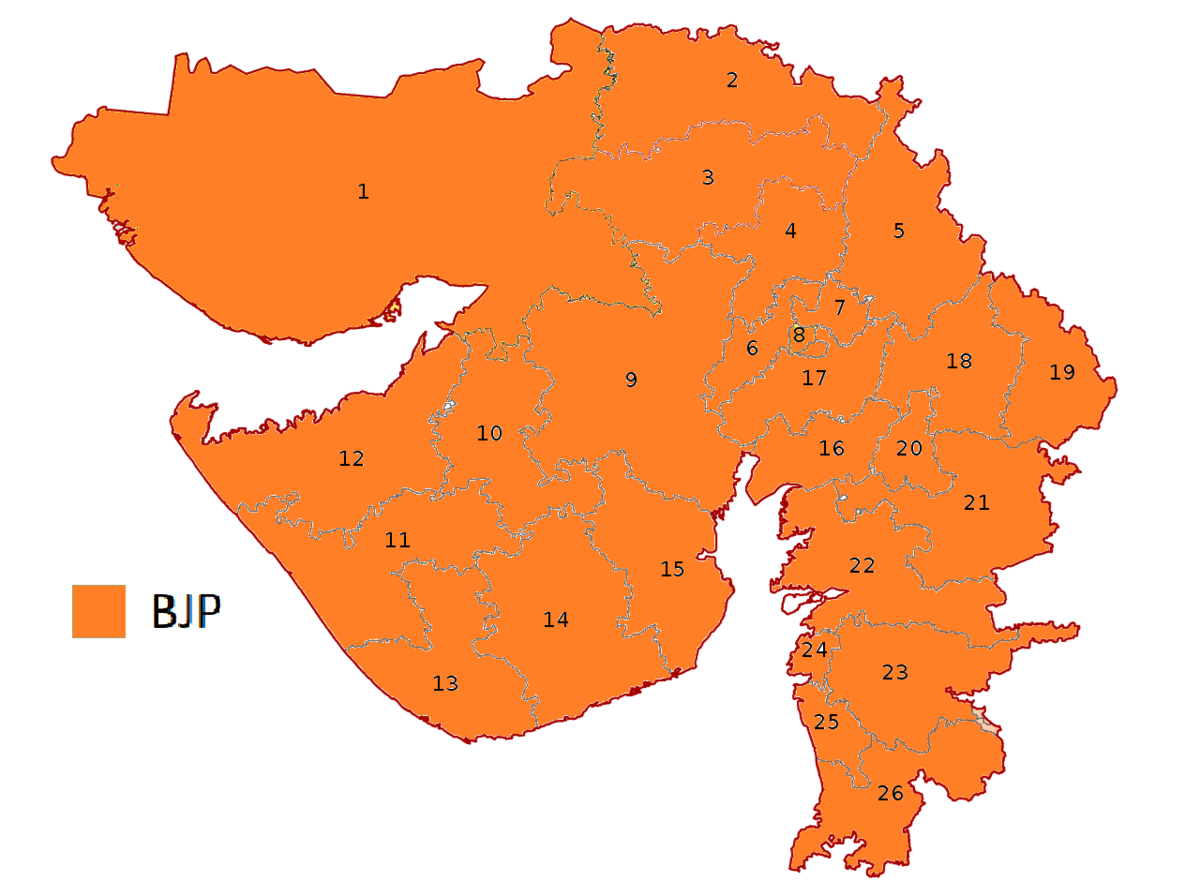

BJP (26)

Constituency		Poll On	Candidate		Result
1	Kachchh (SC)	7 May 2024	Vinodbhai Chavda	BJP	Won
2	Banaskantha	7 May 2024	Rekhaben Chaudhary	BJP	Lost
3	Patan	7 May 2024	Bharatsinhji Dabhi	BJP	Won
4	Mahesana	7 May 2024	Haribhai Patel	BJP	Won
5	Sabarkantha	7 May 2024	Shobhanaben Baraiya	BJP	Won
6	Gandhinagar	7 May 2024	Amit Shah	BJP	Won
7	Ahmedabad East	7 May 2024	Hashmukh Patel	BJP	Won
8	Ahmedabad West (SC)	7 May 2024	Dinesh Makwana	BJP	Won
9	Surendranagar	7 May 2024	Chandubhai Shihora	BJP	Won
10	Rajkot	7 May 2024	Parshottam Rupala	BJP	Won
11	Porbandar	7 May 2024	Mansukh Mandaviya	BJP	Won
12	Jamnagar	7 May 2024	Poonamben Maadam	BJP	Won
13	Junagadh	7 May 2024	Rajesh Chudasama	BJP	Won
14	Amreli	7 May 2024	Bharat Sutariya	BJP	Won
15	Bhavnagar	7 May 2024	Nimuben Bambhania	BJP	Won
16	Anand	7 May 2024	Mitesh Patel	BJP	Won
17	Kheda	7 May 2024	Devusinh Chauhan	BJP	Won
18	Panchmahal	7 May 2024	Rajpalsinh Mahendrasinh Jadhav	BJP	Won
19	Dahod (ST)	7 May 2024	Jasvantsinh Bhabhor	BJP	Won
20	Vadodara	7 May 2024	Hemang Joshi	BJP	Won
21	Chhota Udaipur (ST)	7 May 2024	Jashubhai Rathwa	BJP	Won
22	Bharuch	7 May 2024	Mansukhbhai Vasava	BJP	Won
23	Bardoli (ST)	7 May 2024	Parbhubhai Vasava	BJP	Won
24	Surat	7 May 2024	Mukesh Dalal	BJP	Won
25	Navsari	7 May 2024	C. R. Patil	BJP	Won
26	Valsad (ST)	7 May 2024	Dhaval Patel	BJP	Won

== Haryana ==
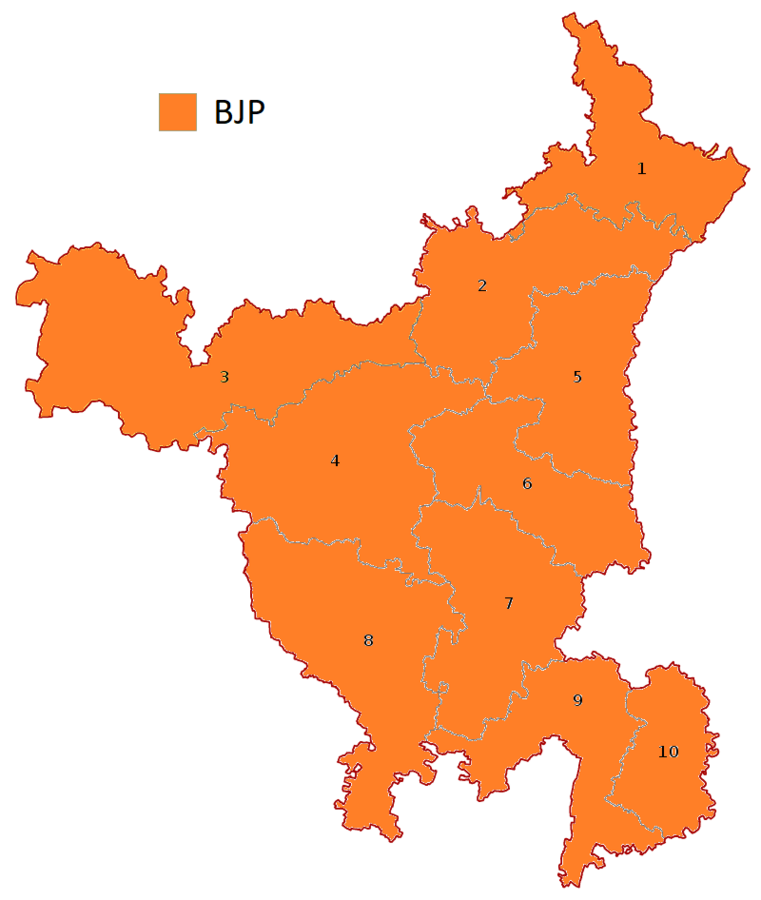

BJP (10)

Constituency		Poll On	Candidate		Result
1	Ambala (SC)	25 May 2024	Banto Kataria	BJP	Lost
2	Kurukshetra	25 May 2024	Naveen Jindal	BJP	Won
3	Sirsa (SC)	25 May 2024	Ashok Tanwar	BJP	Lost
4	Hisar	25 May 2024	Ranjit Singh Chautala	BJP	Lost
5	Karnal	25 May 2024	Manohar Lal Khattar	BJP	Won
6	Sonipat	25 May 2024	Mohan Lal Badoli	BJP	Lost
7	Rohtak	25 May 2024	Arvind Kumar Sharma	BJP	Lost
8	Bhiwani–Mahendragarh	25 May 2024	Dharambir Singh Chaudhary	BJP	Won
9	Gurgaon	25 May 2024	Rao Inderjit Singh	BJP	Won
10	Faridabad	25 May 2024	Krishan Pal Gurjar	BJP	Won

== Himachal Pradesh ==
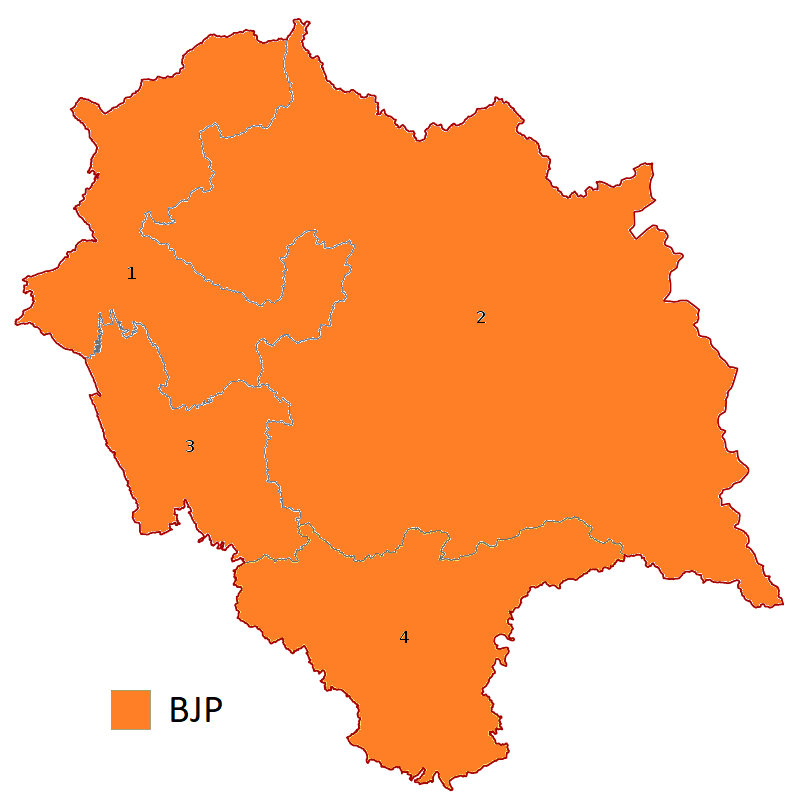

BJP (4)

Constituency		Poll On	Candidate		Result
1	Kangra	1 June 2024	Rajeev Bhardwaj	BJP	Won
2	Mandi	1 June 2024	Kangana Ranaut	BJP	Won
3	Hamirpur	1 June 2024	Anurag Thakur	BJP	Won
4	Shimla (SC)	1 June 2024	Suresh Kumar Kashyap	BJP	Won

== Jammu and Kashmir ==
2024 Lok Sabha NDA Jammu and Kashmir Map

BJP (2)

Constituency		Poll On	Candidate		Result
1	Baramulla	20 May 2024	DNC		
2	Srinagar	13 May 2024	DNC		
3	Anantnag–Rajouri	25 May 2024	DNC		
4	Udhampur	19 April 2024	Jitendra Singh	BJP	Won
5	Jammu	26 April 2024	Jugal Kishore Sharma	BJP	Won

== Jharkhand ==
NDA seat sharing in Jharkhand

BJP (13)
AJSU (1)

Constituency		Poll On	Candidate		Result
1	Rajmahal (ST)	1 June 2024	Tala Marandi	BJP	Lost
2	Dumka (ST)	1 June 2024	Sita Soren	BJP	Lost
3	Godda	1 June 2024	Nishikant Dubey	BJP	Won
4	Chatra	20 May 2024	Kalicharan Singh	BJP	Won
5	Kodarma	20 May 2024	Annpurna Devi	BJP	Won
6	Giridih	25 May 2024	Chandra Prakash Choudhary	AJSU	Won
7	Dhanbad	25 May 2024	Dulu Mahato	BJP	Won
8	Ranchi	25 May 2024	Sanjay Seth	BJP	Won
9	Jamshedpur	25 May 2024	Bidyut Baran Mahato	BJP	Won
10	Singhbhum (ST)	13 May 2024	Geeta Koda	BJP	Lost
11	Khunti (ST)	13 May 2024	Arjun Munda	BJP	Lost
12	Lohardaga (ST)	13 May 2024	Sameer Oraon	BJP	Lost
13	Palamau (SC)	13 May 2024	Vishnu Dayal Ram	BJP	Won
14	Hazaribagh	20 May 2024	Manish Jaiswal	BJP	Won

== Karnataka ==
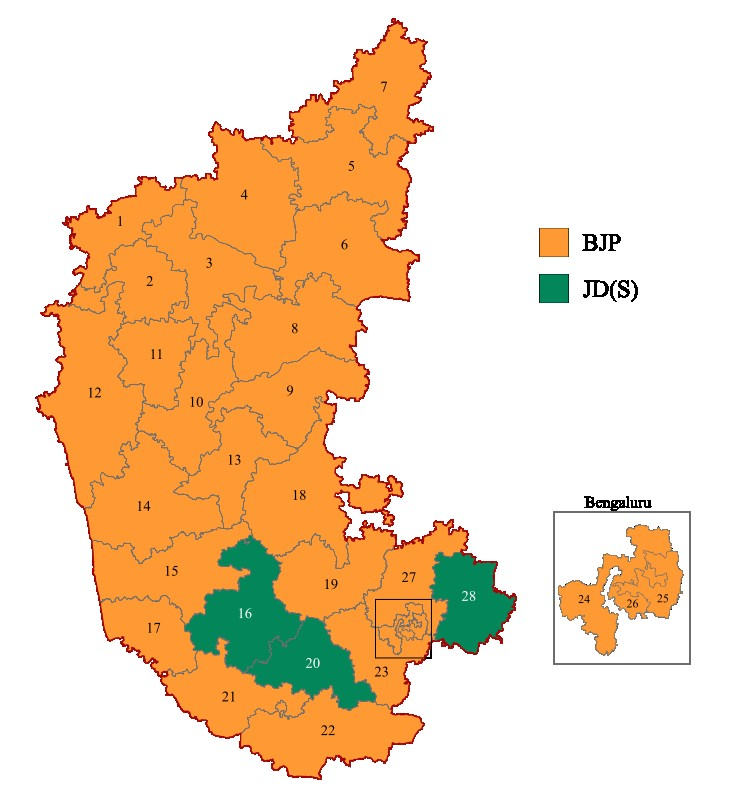

BJP (25)
JD(S) (3)

Constituency		Poll On	Candidate		Result
1	Chikkodi	7 May 2024	Annasaheb Jolle	BJP	Lost
2	Belgaum	7 May 2024	Jagadish Shettar	BJP	Won
3	Bagalkot	7 May 2024	P. C. Gaddigoudar	BJP	Won
4	Bijapur (SC)	7 May 2024	Ramesh Jigajinagi	BJP	Won
5	Gulbarga (SC)	7 May 2024	Umesh. G. Jadhav	BJP	Lost
6	Raichur (ST)	7 May 2024	Raja Amareshwara Naik	BJP	Lost
7	Bidar	7 May 2024	Bhagwanth Khuba	BJP	Lost
8	Koppal	7 May 2024	Basavaraj Kyavator	BJP	Lost
9	Bellary (ST)	7 May 2024	B. Sriramulu	BJP	Lost
10	Haveri	7 May 2024	Basavaraj Bommai	BJP	Won
11	Dharwad	7 May 2024	Pralhad Joshi	BJP	Won
12	Uttara Kannada	7 May 2024	Vishweshwar Hegde Kageri	BJP	Won
13	Davanagere	7 May 2024	Gayathri Siddeshwara	BJP	Lost
14	Shimoga	7 May 2024	B. Y. Raghavendra	BJP	Won
15	Udupi Chikmagalur	26 April 2024	Kota Srinivas Poojary	BJP	Won
16	Hassan	26 April 2024	Prajwal Revanna	JD(S)	Lost
17	Dakshina Kannada	26 April 2024	Brijesh Chowta	BJP	Won
18	Chitradurga (SC)	26 April 2024	Govind Karjol	BJP	Won
19	Tumkur	26 April 2024	V. Somanna	BJP	Won
20	Mandya	26 April 2024	H. D. Kumaraswamy	JD(S)	Won
21	Mysore	26 April 2024	Yaduveer Krishnadatta Chamaraja Wadiyar	BJP	Won
22	Chamarajanagar (SC)	26 April 2024	S. Balaraj	BJP	Lost
23	Bangalore Rural	26 April 2024	C. N. Manjunath	BJP	Won
24	Bangalore North	26 April 2024	Shobha Karandlaje	BJP	Won
25	Bangalore Central	26 April 2024	P. C. Mohan	BJP	Won
26	Bangalore South	26 April 2024	Tejasvi Surya	BJP	Won
27	Chikballapur	26 April 2024	K. Sudhakar	BJP	Won
28	Kolar (SC)	26 April 2024	M. Mallesh Babu	JD(S)	Won

== Kerala ==
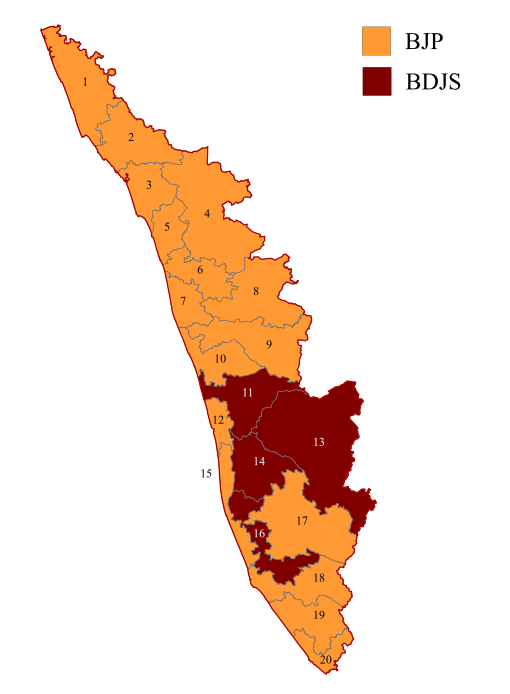

BJP (16)
BDJS (4)

Constituency		Poll On	Candidate		Result
1	Kasaragod	26 April 2024	M. L. Ashwini	BJP	Lost
2	Kannur	26 April 2024	C. Raghunath	BJP	Lost
3	Vatakara	26 April 2024	Prafulla Krishna	BJP	Lost
4	Wayanad	26 April 2024	K. Surendran	BJP	Lost
5	Kozhikode	26 April 2024	M. T. Ramesh	BJP	Lost
6	Malappuram	26 April 2024	Dr. Abdul Salam	BJP	Lost
7	Ponnani	26 April 2024	Niveditha Subramanian	BJP	Lost
8	Palakkad	26 April 2024	C. Krishnakumar	BJP	Lost
9	Alathur (SC)	26 April 2024	Dr. T. N. Sarasu	BJP	Lost
10	Thrissur	26 April 2024	Suresh Gopi	BJP	Won
11	Chalakudy	26 April 2024	K.A. Unnikrishnan	BDJS	Lost
12	Ernakulam	26 April 2024	Dr. KS Radhakrishnan	BJP	Lost
13	Idukki	26 April 2024	Sangeetha Vishwanathan	BDJS	Lost
14	Kottayam	26 April 2024	Thushar Vellappally	BDJS	Lost
15	Alappuzha	26 April 2024	Sobha Surendran	BJP	Lost
16	Mavelikara (SC)	26 April 2024	Baiju Kalasala	BDJS	Lost
17	Pathanamthitta	26 April 2024	Anil K. Antony	BJP	Lost
18	Kollam	26 April 2024	G. Krishnkumar	BJP	Lost
19	Attingal	26 April 2024	V. Muraleedharan	BJP	Lost
20	Thiruvananthapuram	26 April 2024	Rajeev Chandrasekhar	BJP	Lost

== Ladakh ==
2024 Lok Sabha NDA Ladakh Map

BJP (1)

Constituency		Poll On	Candidate		Result
1	Ladakh	20 May 2024	Tashi Gyalson	BJP	Lost

== Lakshadweep ==
NCP (1)

Constituency		Poll On	Candidate		Result
1	Lakshadweep (ST)	19 April 2024	T. P. Yusuf	NCP	Lost

== Madhya Pradesh ==
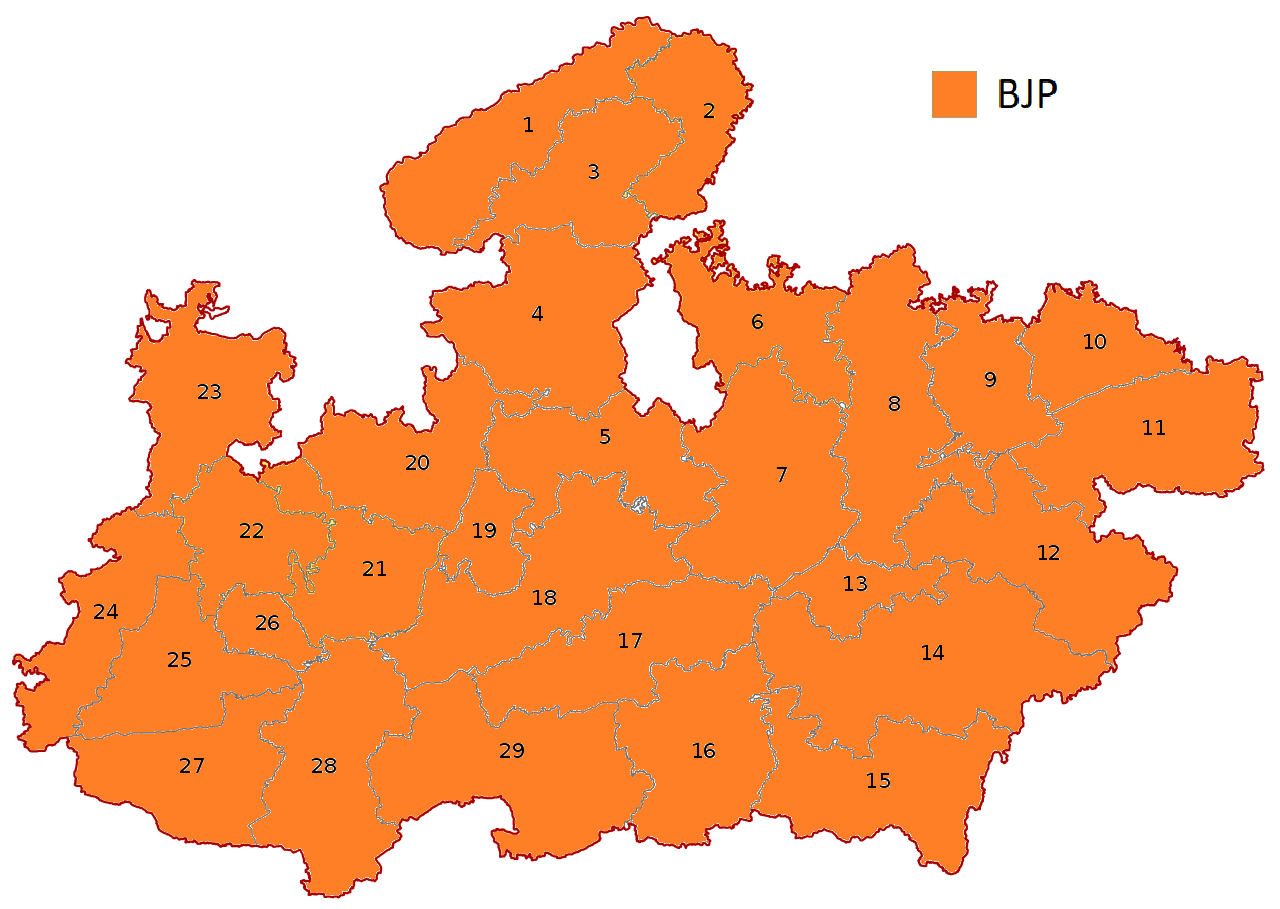

BJP (29)

Constituency		Poll On	Candidate		Result
1	Morena	7 May 2024	Shivmangal Singh Tomar	BJP	Won
2	Bhind (SC)	7 May 2024	Sandhya Ray	BJP	Won
3	Gwalior	7 May 2024	Bharat Singh Kushwah	BJP	Won
4	Guna	7 May 2024	Jyotiraditya Scindia	BJP	Won
5	Sagar	7 May 2024	Lata Wankhede	BJP	Won
6	Tikamgarh (SC)	26 April 2024	Virendra Kumar Khatik	BJP	Won
7	Damoh	26 April 2024	Rahul Lodhi	BJP	Won
8	Khajuraho	26 April 2024	V. D. Sharma	BJP	Won
9	Satna	26 April 2024	Ganesh Singh	BJP	Won
10	Rewa	26 April 2024	Janardan Mishra	BJP	Won
11	Sidhi	19 April 2024	Rajesh Mishra	BJP	Won
12	Shahdol (ST)	19 April 2024	Himadri Singh	BJP	Won
13	Jabalpur	19 April 2024	Ashish Dubey	BJP	Won
14	Mandla (ST)	19 April 2024	Faggan Singh Kulaste	BJP	Won
15	Balaghat	19 April 2024	Bharti Pardhi	BJP	Won
16	Chhindwara	19 April 2024	Vivek Bunty Sahu	BJP	Won
17	Hoshangabad	26 April 2024	Darshan Singh Choudhary	BJP	Won
18	Vidisha	7 May 2024	Shivraj Singh Chouhan	BJP	Won
19	Bhopal	7 May 2024	Alok Sharma	BJP	Won
20	Rajgarh	7 May 2024	Rodmal Nagar	BJP	Won
21	Dewas (SC)	13 May 2024	Mahendra Solanki	BJP	Won
22	Ujjain (SC)	13 May 2024	Anil Firojiya	BJP	Won
23	Mandsaur	13 May 2024	Sudhir Gupta	BJP	Won
24	Ratlam (ST)	13 May 2024	Anita Nagar Singh Chouhan	BJP	Won
25	Dhar (ST)	13 May 2024	Savitri Thakur	BJP	Won
26	Indore	13 May 2024	Shankar Lalwani	BJP	Won
27	Khargone (ST)	13 May 2024	Gajendra Patel	BJP	Won
28	Khandwa	13 May 2024	Gyaneswar Patil	BJP	Won
29	Betul (ST)	7 May 2024	Durga Das Uikey	BJP	Won

== Maharashtra ==

BJP (28)
SS (15)
NCP (4)
RSPS (1)

Constituency		Poll On	Candidate		Result
1	Nandurbar (ST)	13 May 2024	Heena Gavit	BJP	Lost
2	Dhule	20 May 2024	Subhash Bhamre	BJP	Lost
3	Jalgaon	13 May 2024	Smita Wagh	BJP	Won
4	Raver	13 May 2024	Raksha Khadse	BJP	Won
5	Buldhana	26 April 2024	Prataprao Jadhav	SS	Won
6	Akola	26 April 2024	Anup Dhotre	BJP	Won
7	Amravati (SC)	26 April 2024	Navneet Kaur Rana	BJP	Lost
8	Wardha	26 April 2024	Ramdas Tadas	BJP	Lost
9	Ramtek (SC)	19 April 2024	Raju Parwe	SS	Lost
10	Nagpur	19 April 2024	Nitin Gadkari	BJP	Won
11	Bhandara-Gondiya	19 April 2024	Sunil Mendhe	BJP	Lost
12	Gadchiroli-Chimur (ST)	19 April 2024	Ashok Nete	BJP	Lost
13	Chandrapur	19 April 2024	Sudhir Mungantiwar	BJP	Lost
14	Yavatmal-Washim	26 April 2024	Rajashri Patil	SS	Lost
15	Hingoli	26 April 2024	Baburao Kadam Kohalikar	SS	Lost
16	Nanded	26 April 2024	Prataprao Chikhalikar	BJP	Lost
17	Parbhani	26 April 2024	Mahadev Jankar	RSPS	Lost
18	Jalna	13 May 2024	Raosaheb Danve	BJP	Lost
19	Aurangabad	13 May 2024	Sandipanrao Bhumre	SS	Won
20	Dindori (ST)	20 May 2024	Bharati Pawar	BJP	Lost
21	Nashik	20 May 2024	Hemant Godse	SS	Lost
22	Palghar (ST)	20 May 2024	Hemant Vishnu Savara	BJP	Won
23	Bhiwandi	20 May 2024	Kapil Patil	BJP	Lost
24	Kalyan	20 May 2024	Shrikant Shinde	SS	Won
25	Thane	20 May 2024	Naresh Mhaske	SS	Won
26	Mumbai North	20 May 2024	Piyush Goyal	BJP	Won
27	Mumbai North West	20 May 2024	Ravindra Waikar	SS	Won
28	Mumbai North East	20 May 2024	Mihir Kotecha	BJP	Lost
29	Mumbai North Central	20 May 2024	Ujjwal Nikam	BJP	Lost
30	Mumbai South Central	20 May 2024	Rahul Shewale	SS	Lost
31	Mumbai South	20 May 2024	Yamini Jadhav	SS	Lost
32	Raigad	7 May 2024	Sunil Tatkare	NCP	Won
33	Maval	13 May 2024	Shrirang Barne	SS	Won
34	Pune	13 May 2024	Murlidhar Mohol	BJP	Won
35	Baramati	7 May 2024	Sunetra Pawar	NCP	Lost
36	Shirur	13 May 2024	Shivajirao Adhalarao Patil	NCP	Lost
37	Ahmednagar	13 May 2024	Sujay Vikhe Patil	BJP	Lost
38	Shirdi (SC)	13 May 2024	Sadashiv Lokhande	SS	Lost
39	Beed	13 May 2024	Pankaja Munde	BJP	Lost
40	Osmanabad	7 May 2024	Archana Ranajagjitsinha Patil	NCP	Lost
41	Latur (SC)	7 May 2024	Sudhakar Shrangare	BJP	Lost
42	Solapur (SC)	7 May 2024	Ram Satpute	BJP	Lost
43	Madha	7 May 2024	Ranjit Naik-Nimbalkar	BJP	Lost
44	Sangli	7 May 2024	Sanjaykaka Patil	BJP	Lost
45	Satara	7 May 2024	Udayanraje Bhosale	BJP	Won
46	Ratnagiri-Sindhudurg	7 May 2024	Narayan Rane	BJP	Won
47	Kolhapur	7 May 2024	Sanjay Mandlik	SS	Lost
48	Hatkanangle	7 May 2024	Dhairyasheel Mane	SS	Won

== Manipur ==
2024 Lok Sabha NDA Alliance Seat Sharing Manipur

BJP (1)
NPF (1)

Constituency		Poll on		Candidate		Result
1	Inner Manipur	19 April 2024		Thounaojam Basanta Kumar Singh	BJP	Lost
2	Outer Manipur (ST)	19 April 2024	26 April 2024	Kachui Timothy Zimik	NPF	Lost

== Meghalaya ==
2024 Lok Sabha NDA Seat Sharing Meghalaya

NPP (2)

Constituency		Poll On	Candidate		Result
1	Shillong (ST)	19 April 2024	Ampareen Lyngdoh	NPP	Lost
2	Tura (ST)	19 April 2024	Agatha Sangma	NPP	Lost

== Mizoram ==
Mizoram NDA

BJP (1)

Constituency		Poll On	Candidate		Result
1	Mizoram (ST)	19 April 2024	Vanlalhmuaka	BJP	Lost

== Nagaland ==
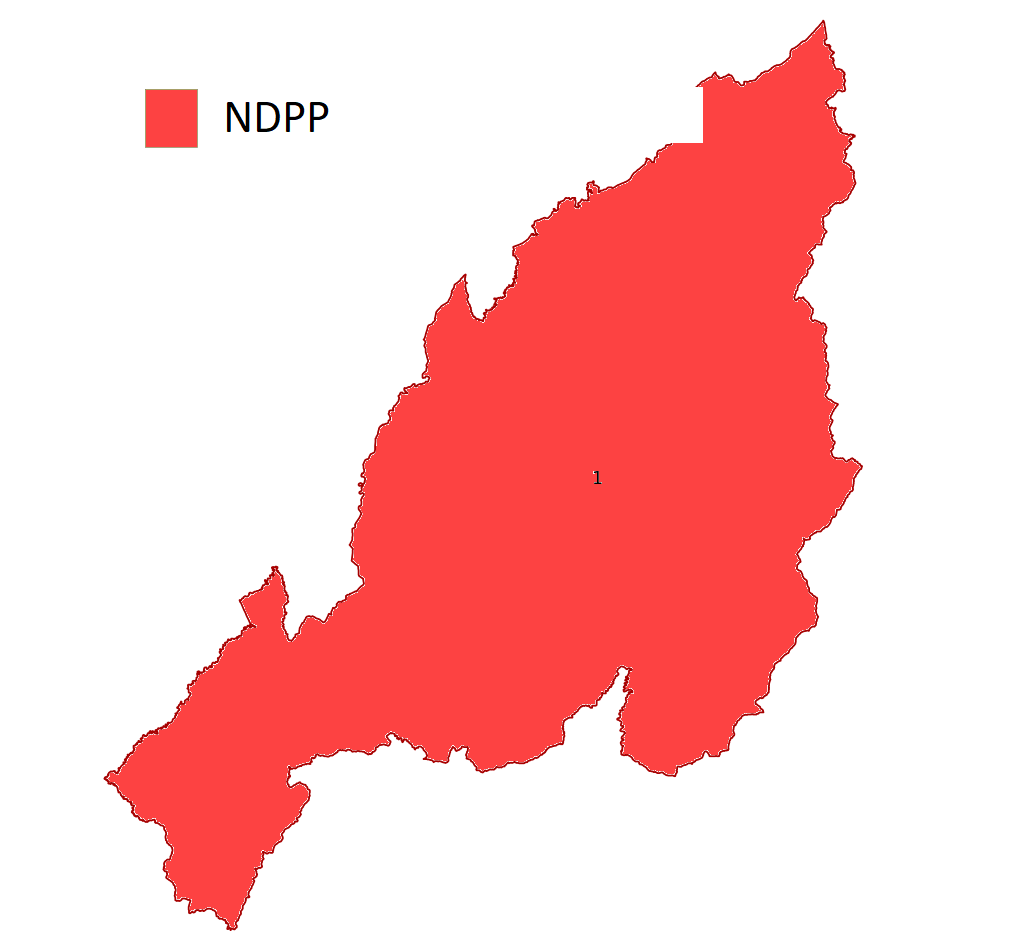
Nagaland NDA

NDPP (1)

Constituency		Poll On	Candidate		Result
1	Nagaland	19 April 2024	Chumben Murry	NDPP	Lost

== Odisha ==
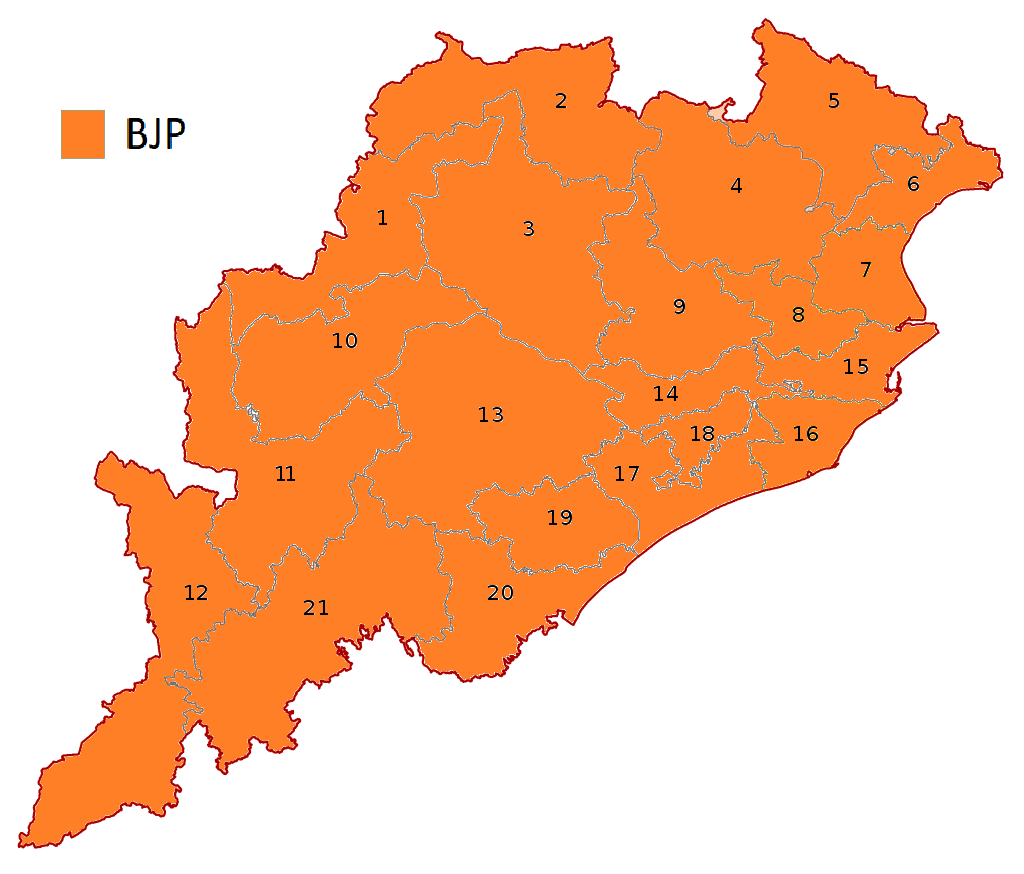

BJP (21)

Constituency		Poll On	Candidate		Result
1	Bargarh	20 May 2024	Pradip Purohit	BJP	Won
2	Sundargarh (ST)	20 May 2024	Jual Oram	BJP	Won
3	Sambalpur	25 May 2024	Dharmendra Pradhan	BJP	Won
4	Keonjhar (ST)	25 May 2024	Ananta Nayak	BJP	Won
5	Mayurbhanj (ST)	1 June 2024	Naba Charan Majhi	BJP	Won
6	Balasore	1 June 2024	Pratap Chandra Sarangi	BJP	Won
7	Bhadrak (SC)	1 June 2024	Avimanyu Sethi	BJP	Won
8	Jajpur (SC)	1 June 2024	Rabindra Narayan Behera	BJP	Won
9	Dhenkanal	25 May 2024	Rudra Narayan Pany	BJP	Won
10	Bolangir	20 May 2024	Sangeeta Kumari Singh Deo	BJP	Won
11	Kalahandi	13 May 2024	Malvika Devi	BJP	Won
12	Nabarangpur (ST)	13 May 2024	Balabhadra Majhi	BJP	Won
13	Kandhamal	20 May 2024	Sukanta Kumar Panigrahi	BJP	Won
14	Cuttack	25 May 2024	Bhartruhari Mahtab	BJP	Won
15	Kendrapara	1 June 2024	Baijayant Panda	BJP	Won
16	Jagatsinghpur (SC)	1 June 2024	Bibhu Prasad Tarai	BJP	Won
17	Puri	25 May 2024	Sambit Patra	BJP	Won
18	Bhubaneswar	25 May 2024	Aparajita Sarangi	BJP	Won
19	Aska	20 May 2024	Anita Subhadarshini	BJP	Won
20	Berhampur	13 May 2024	Pradeep Kumar Panigrahy	BJP	Won
21	Koraput (ST)	13 May 2024	Kaleram Majhi	BJP	Lost

== Puducherry ==
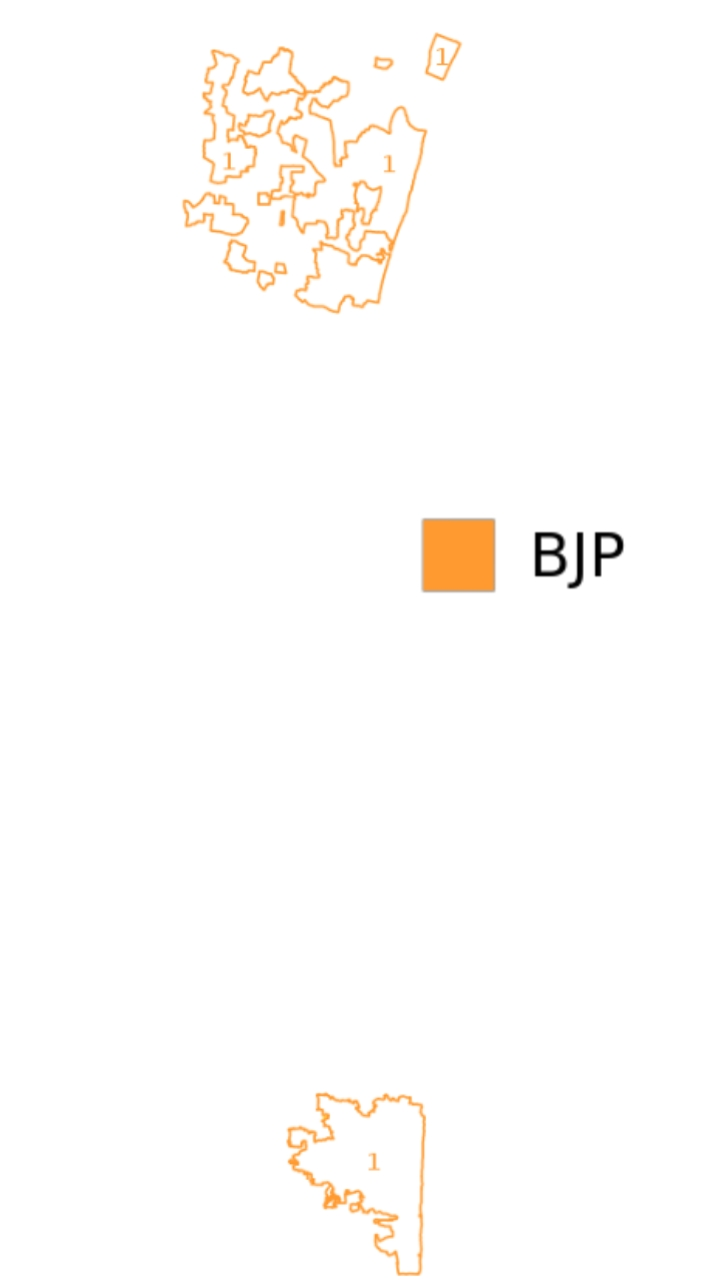

BJP (1)

Constituency		Poll On	Candidate		Result
1	Puducherry	19 April 2024	A. Namassivayam	BJP	Lost

== Punjab ==
2024 Lok Sabha Punjab NDA Coloured

BJP (13)

Constituency		Poll On	Candidate		Result
1	Gurdaspur	1 June 2024	Dinesh Singh	BJP	Lost
2	Amritsar	1 June 2024	Taranjit Singh Sandhu	BJP	Lost
3	Khadoor Sahib	1 June 2024	Manjeet Singh Manna Miawind	BJP	Lost
4	Jalandhar (SC)	1 June 2024	Sushil Kumar Rinku	BJP	Lost
5	Hoshiarpur (SC)	1 June 2024	Anita Som Parkash	BJP	Lost
6	Anandpur Sahib	1 June 2024	Subhash Sharma	BJP	Lost
7	Ludhiana	1 June 2024	Ravneet Singh Bittu	BJP	Lost
8	Fatehgarh Sahib (SC)	1 June 2024	Gejja Ram Valmiki	BJP	Lost
9	Faridkot (SC)	1 June 2024	Hans Raj Hans	BJP	Lost
10	Firozpur	1 June 2024	Rana Gurmit Singh Sodhi	BJP	Lost
11	Bathinda	1 June 2024	Parampal Kaur Sidhu	BJP	Lost
12	Sangrur	1 June 2024	Arvind Khanna	BJP	Lost
13	Patiala	1 June 2024	Preneet Kaur	BJP	Lost

== Rajasthan ==
2024 Lok Sabha Rajasthan NDA

BJP (25)

Constituency		Poll On	Candidate		Result
1	Ganganagar (SC)	19 April 2024	Priyanka Balan	BJP	Lost
2	Bikaner (SC)	19 April 2024	Arjun Ram Meghwal	BJP	Won
3	Churu	19 April 2024	Devendra Jhajharia	BJP	Lost
4	Jhunjhunu	19 April 2024	Shubhkaran Choudhary	BJP	Lost
5	Sikar	19 April 2024	Sumedhanand Saraswati	BJP	Lost
6	Jaipur Rural	19 April 2024	Rao Rajendra Singh	BJP	Won
7	Jaipur	19 April 2024	Manju Sharma	BJP	Won
8	Alwar	19 April 2024	Bhupender Yadav	BJP	Won
9	Bharatpur (SC)	19 April 2024	Ramswaroop Koli	BJP	Lost
10	Karauli–Dholpur (SC)	19 April 2024	Indu Devi Jatav	BJP	Lost
11	Dausa (ST)	19 April 2024	Kanhaiya Lal Meena	BJP	Lost
12	Tonk–Sawai Madhopur	26 April 2024	Sukhbir Singh Jaunapuria	BJP	Lost
13	Ajmer	26 April 2024	Bhagirath Chaudhary	BJP	Won
14	Nagaur	19 April 2024	Jyoti Mirdha	BJP	Lost
15	Pali	26 April 2024	P. P. Chaudhary	BJP	Won
16	Jodhpur	26 April 2024	Gajendra Singh Shekhawat	BJP	Won
17	Barmer	26 April 2024	Kailash Choudhary	BJP	Lost
18	Jalore	26 April 2024	Lumbaram Choudhary	BJP	Won
19	Udaipur (ST)	26 April 2024	Manna Lal Rawat	BJP	Won
20	Banswara (ST)	26 April 2024	Mahendrajeet Singh Malviya	BJP	Lost
21	Chittorgarh	26 April 2024	Chandra Prakash Joshi	BJP	Won
22	Rajsamand	26 April 2024	Mahima Kumari Mewar	BJP	Won
23	Bhilwara	26 April 2024	Damodar Agarwal	BJP	Won
24	Kota	26 April 2024	Om Birla	BJP	Won
25	Jhalawar–Baran	26 April 2024	Dushyant Singh	BJP	Won

== Sikkim ==
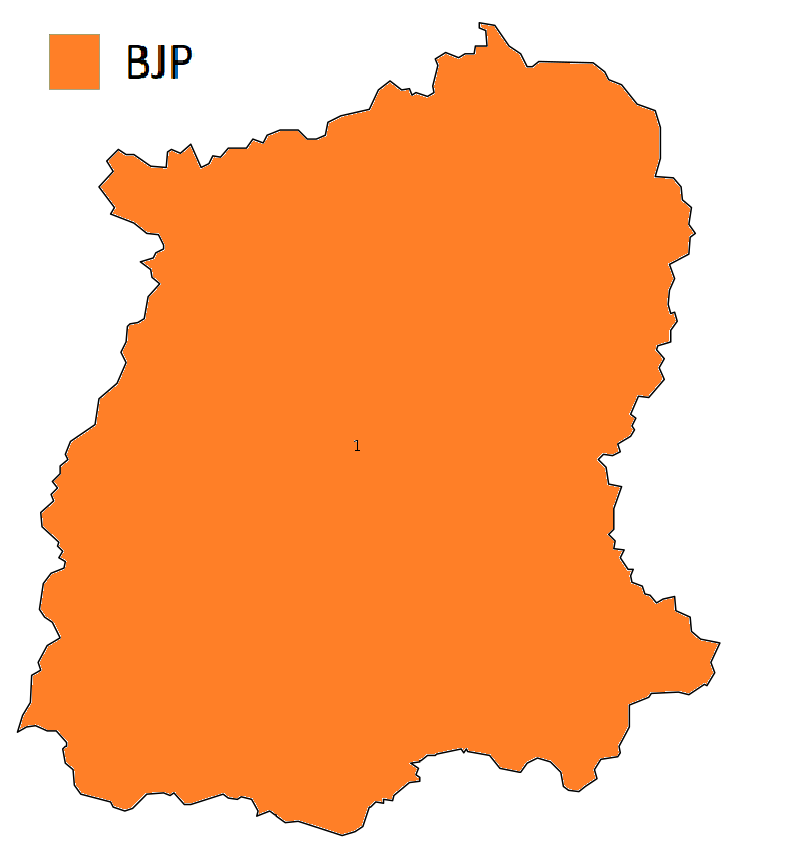

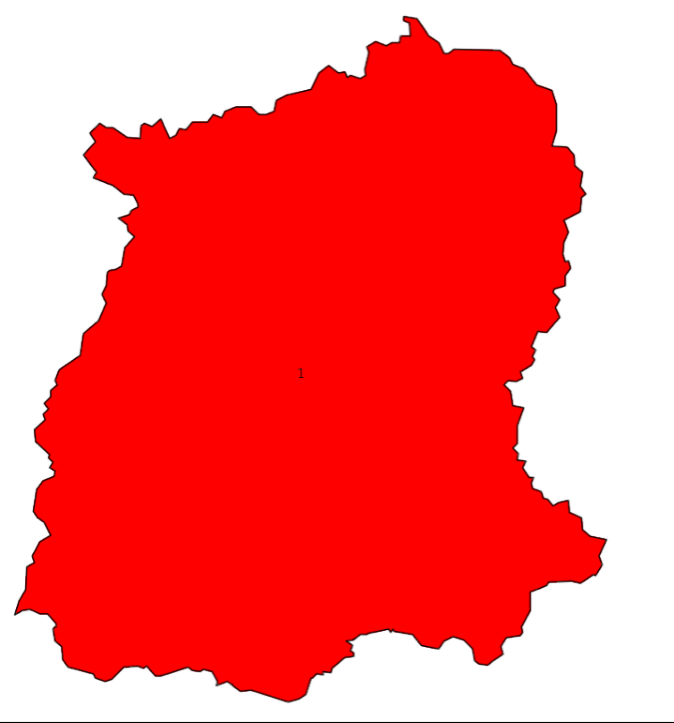

BJP (1)
SKM (1)

Constituency		Poll On	Candidate		Result
1	Sikkim	19 April 2024	Dinesh Chandra Nepal	BJP	Lost
1	Sikkim	19 April 2024	Indra Hang Subba	SKM	Won

== Tamil Nadu ==
Tamil Nadu NDA

BJP (23)
PMK (10)
TMC(M) (3)
AMMK (2)
Independent (1)

Constituency			Candidate		Result
1	Thiruvallur (SC)	19 April 2024	Pon V Balaganapathy	BJP	Lost
2	Chennai North	19 April 2024	R. C. Paul Kanagaraj	BJP	Lost
3	Chennai South	19 April 2024	Tamilisai Soundararajan	BJP	Lost
4	Chennai Central	19 April 2024	Vinoj P. Selvam	BJP	Lost
5	Sriperumbudur	19 April 2024	V.N. Venugopal	TMC(M)	Lost
6	Kancheepuram (SC)	19 April 2024	Jothi Venkatesh	PMK	Lost
7	Arakkonam	19 April 2024	K. Balu	PMK	Lost
8	Vellore	19 April 2024	A. C. Shanmugam	BJP	Lost
9	Krishnagiri	19 April 2024	C. Narasimhan	BJP	Lost
10	Dharmapuri	19 April 2024	Sowmiya Anbumani	PMK	Lost
11	Tiruvannamalai	19 April 2024	A Ashwathaman	BJP	Lost
12	Arani	19 April 2024	A. Ganeshkumar	PMK	Lost
13	Villupuram (SC)	19 April 2024	Murali Shankar	PMK	Lost
14	Kallakurichi	19 April 2024	Devdas Wodeyar	PMK	Lost
15	Salem	19 April 2024	Annadurai	PMK	Lost
16	Namakkal	19 April 2024	K. P. Ramalingam	BJP	Lost
17	Erode	19 April 2024	P. Vijayakumar	TMC(M)	Lost
18	Tiruppur	19 April 2024	A.P. Muruganandam	BJP	Lost
19	Nilgiris (SC)	19 April 2024	L. Murugan	BJP	Lost
20	Coimbatore	19 April 2024	K. Annamalai	BJP	Lost
21	Pollachi	19 April 2024	K Vasantharajan	BJP	Lost
22	Dindigul	19 April 2024	M. Thilagabama	PMK	Lost
23	Karur	19 April 2024	V. V. Senthil Nathan	BJP	Lost
24	Tiruchirappalli	19 April 2024	Senthilnathan	AMMK	Lost
25	Perambalur	19 April 2024	T. R. Paarivendhar	BJP	Lost
26	Cuddalore	19 April 2024	Thangar Bachan	PMK	Lost
27	Chidambaram (SC)	19 April 2024	P. Karthiyayini	BJP	Lost
28	Mayiladuthurai	19 April 2024	M.K.Stalin	PMK	Lost
29	Nagapattinam (SC)	19 April 2024	SGM Ramesh	BJP	Lost
30	Thanjavur	19 April 2024	M Muruganandam	BJP	Lost
31	Sivaganga	19 April 2024	T Devanathan Yadav	BJP	Lost
32	Madurai	19 April 2024	Raama Sreenivasan	BJP	Lost
33	Theni	19 April 2024	T. T. V. Dinakaran	AMMK	Lost
34	Virudhunagar	19 April 2024	Radhika Sarathkumar	BJP	Lost
35	Ramanathapuram	19 April 2024	O. Paneerselvam	IND	Lost
36	Thoothukudi	19 April 2024	S. D. R. Vijayaseelan	TMC(M)	Lost
37	Tenkasi (SC)	19 April 2024	B John Pandian	BJP	Lost
38	Tirunelveli	19 April 2024	Nainar Nagendran	BJP	Lost
39	Kanyakumari	19 April 2024	Pon Radhakrishnan	BJP	Lost

== Telangana ==
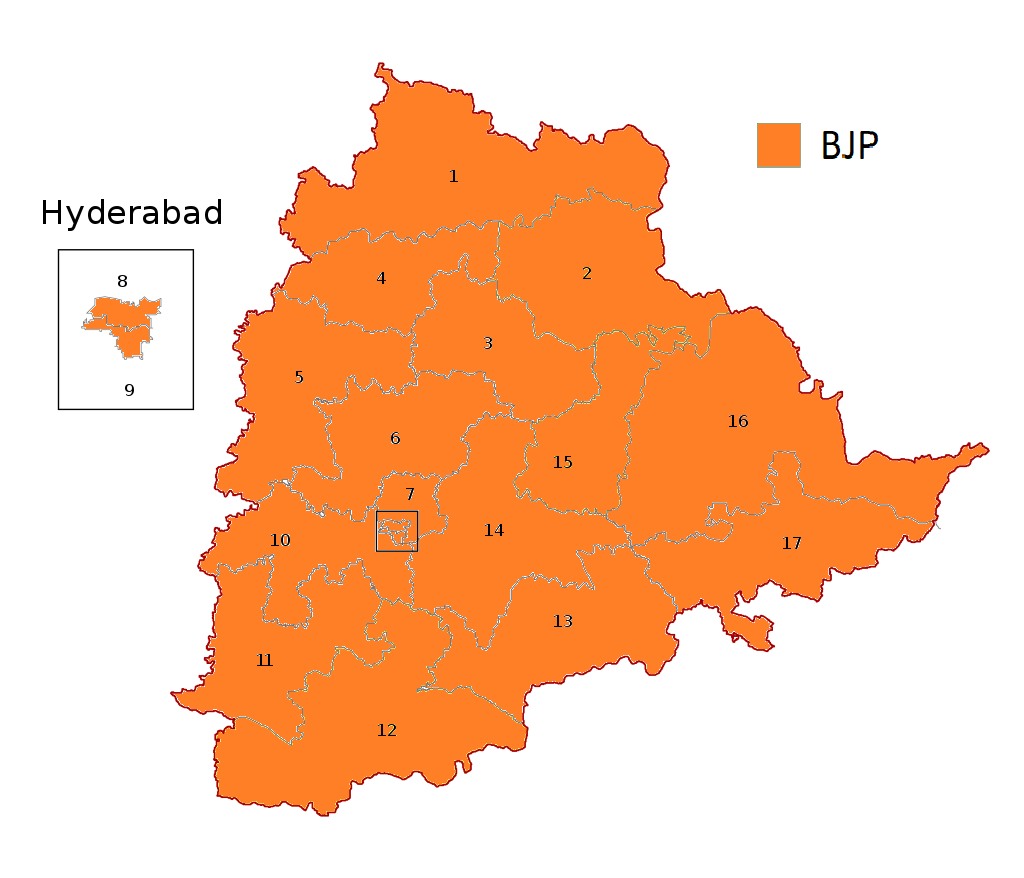

BJP (17)

Constituency		Poll On	Candidate		Result
1	Adilabad (ST)	13 May 2024	Godam Nagesh	BJP	Won
2	Peddapalli (SC)	13 May 2024	Gomasa Srinivas	BJP	Lost
3	Karimnagar	13 May 2024	Bandi Sanjay Kumar	BJP	Won
4	Nizamabad	13 May 2024	Dharmapuri Arvind	BJP	Won
5	Zahirabad	13 May 2024	Bheemarao Basawanthrao Patil	BJP	Lost
6	Medak	13 May 2024	Raghunandan Rao	BJP	Won
7	Malkajgiri	13 May 2024	Etela Rajender	BJP	Won
8	Secunderabad	13 May 2024	Gangapuram Kishan Reddy	BJP	Won
9	Hyderabad	13 May 2024	Kompella Madhavi Latha	BJP	Lost
10	Chevella	13 May 2024	Konda Vishweshwar Reddy	BJP	Won
11	Mahbubnagar	13 May 2024	Dharmavarapu Kottam Aruna	BJP	Won
12	Nagarkurnool (SC)	13 May 2024	Pothuganti Bharath Prasad	BJP	Lost
13	Nalgonda	13 May 2024	Shanampudi Saidireddy	BJP	Lost
14	Bhongir	13 May 2024	Boora Narsaiah Goud	BJP	Lost
15	Warangal (SC)	13 May 2024	Aroori Ramesh	BJP	Lost
16	Mahabubabad (ST)	13 May 2024	Azmeera Seetaram Naik	BJP	Lost
17	Khammam	13 May 2024	Tandra Vinod Rao	BJP	Lost

== Tripura ==
2024 Lok Sabha Tripura NDA

BJP (2)

Constituency		Poll On	Candidate		Result
1	Tripura West	19 April 2024	Biplab Kumar Deb	BJP	Won
2	Tripura East (ST)	26 April 2024	Kriti Singh Debbarma	BJP	Won

== Uttar Pradesh ==
2024 NDA Alliance Lok Sabha Seat Sharing Uttar Pradesh

BJP (75)
RLD (2)
AD(S) (2)
SBSP (1)

Constituency		Poll On	Candidate		Result
1	Saharanpur	19 April 2024	Raghav Lakhanpal	BJP	Lost
2	Kairana	19 April 2024	Pradeep Kumar Chaudhary	BJP	Lost
3	Muzaffarnagar	19 April 2024	Sanjeev Balyan	BJP	Lost
4	Bijnor	19 April 2024	Chandan Chauhan	RLD	Won
5	Nagina (SC)	19 April 2024	Om Kumar	BJP	Lost
6	Moradabad	19 April 2024	Kunwar Sarvesh Kumar Singh	BJP	Lost
7	Rampur	19 April 2024	Ghanshyam Singh Lodhi	BJP	Lost
8	Sambhal	7 May 2024	Parmeshwar Lal Saini	BJP	Lost
9	Amroha	26 April 2024	Kanwar Singh Tanwar	BJP	Won
10	Meerut	26 April 2024	Arun Govil	BJP	Won
11	Baghpat	26 April 2024	Rajkumar Sangwan	RLD	Won
12	Ghaziabad	26 April 2024	Atul Garg	BJP	Won
13	Gautam Buddh Nagar	26 April 2024	Mahesh Sharma	BJP	Won
14	Bulandshahr (SC)	26 April 2024	Bhola Singh	BJP	Won
15	Aligarh	26 April 2024	Satish Kumar Gautam	BJP	Won
16	Hathras (SC)	7 May 2024	Anoop Pradhan	BJP	Won
17	Mathura	26 April 2024	Hema Malini	BJP	Won
18	Agra (SC)	7 May 2024	S. P. Singh Baghel	BJP	Won
19	Fatehpur Sikri	7 May 2024	Rajkumar Chahar	BJP	Won
20	Firozabad	7 May 2024	Thakur Vishwadeep Singh	BJP	Lost
21	Mainpuri	7 May 2024	Jaiveer Singh	BJP	Lost
22	Etah	7 May 2024	Rajveer Singh	BJP	Lost
23	Badaun	7 May 2024	Durvijay Singh Shakya	BJP	Lost
24	Aonla	7 May 2024	Dharmendra Kashyap	BJP	Lost
25	Bareilly	7 May 2024	Chhatrapal Singh Gangwar	BJP	Won
26	Pilibhit	19 April 2024	Jitin Prasada	BJP	Won
27	Shahjahanpur (SC)	13 May 2024	Arun Kumar Sagar	BJP	Won
28	Kheri	13 May 2024	Ajay Mishra Teni	BJP	Lost
29	Dhaurahra	13 May 2024	Rekha Verma	BJP	Lost
30	Sitapur	13 May 2024	Rajesh Verma	BJP	Lost
31	Hardoi (SC)	13 May 2024	Jai Prakash Rawat	BJP	Won
32	Misrikh (SC)	13 May 2024	Ashok Kumar Rawat	BJP	Won
33	Unnao	13 May 2024	Sakshi Maharaj	BJP	Won
34	Mohanlalganj (SC)	20 May 2024	Kaushal Kishore	BJP	Lost
35	Lucknow	20 May 2024	Rajnath Singh	BJP	Won
36	Rae Bareli	20 May 2024	Dinesh Pratap Singh	BJP	Lost
37	Amethi	20 May 2024	Smriti Irani	BJP	Lost
38	Sultanpur	25 May 2024	Maneka Gandhi	BJP	Lost
39	Pratapgarh	25 May 2024	Sangam Lal Gupta	BJP	Lost
40	Farrukhabad	13 May 2024	Mukesh Rajput	BJP	Won
41	Etawah (SC)	13 May 2024	Ram Shankar Katheria	BJP	Lost
42	Kannauj	13 May 2024	Subrat Pathak	BJP	Lost
43	Kanpur Urban	13 May 2024	Ramesh Awasthi	BJP	Won
44	Akbarpur	13 May 2024	Devendra Singh Bhole	BJP	Won
45	Jalaun (SC)	20 May 2024	Bhanu Pratap Singh Verma	BJP	Lost
46	Jhansi	20 May 2024	Anurag Sharma	BJP	Won
47	Hamirpur	20 May 2024	Kunwar Pushpendra Singh Chandel	BJP	Lost
48	Banda	20 May 2024	R. K. Singh Patel	BJP	Lost
49	Fatehpur	20 May 2024	Sadhvi Niranjan Jyoti	BJP	Lost
50	Kaushambi (SC)	20 May 2024	Vinod Sonkar	BJP	Lost
51	Phulpur	25 May 2024	Praveen Patel	BJP	Won
52	Prayagraj	25 May 2024	Neeraj Tripathi	BJP	Lost
53	Barabanki (SC)	20 May 2024	Rajrani Rawat	BJP	Lost
54	Faizabad	20 May 2024	Lallu Singh	BJP	Lost
55	Ambedkar Nagar	25 May 2024	Ritesh Pandey	BJP	Lost
56	Bahraich (SC)	13 May 2024	Arvind Gond	BJP	Won
57	Kaiserganj	20 May 2024	Karan Bhushan Singh	BJP	Won
58	Shravasti	25 May 2024	Saket Misra	BJP	Lost
59	Gonda	20 May 2024	Kirti Vardhan Singh	BJP	Won
60	Domariyaganj	25 May 2024	Jagdambika Pal	BJP	Won
61	Basti	25 May 2024	Harish Dwivedi	BJP	Lost
62	Sant Kabir Nagar	25 May 2024	Praveen Kumar Nishad	BJP	Lost
63	Maharajganj	1 June 2024	Pankaj Chaudhary	BJP	Won
64	Gorakhpur	1 June 2024	Ravi Kishan	BJP	Won
65	Kushi Nagar	1 June 2024	Vijay Kumar Dubey	BJP	Won
66	Deoria	1 June 2024	Shashank Mani Tripathi	BJP	Won
67	Bansgaon (SC)	1 June 2024	Kamlesh Paswan	BJP	Won
68	Lalganj (SC)	25 May 2024	Neelam Sonkar	BJP	Lost
69	Azamgarh	25 May 2024	Dinesh Lal Yadav	BJP	Lost
70	Ghosi	1 June 2024	Arvind Rajbhar	SBSP	Lost
71	Salempur	1 June 2024	Ravindra Kushawaha	BJP	Lost
72	Ballia	1 June 2024	Neeraj Shekhar	BJP	Lost
73	Jaunpur	25 May 2024	Kripashankar Singh	BJP	Lost
74	Machhlishahr (SC)	25 May 2024	B. P. Saroj	BJP	Lost
75	Ghazipur	1 June 2024	Parasnath Rai	BJP	Lost
76	Chandauli	1 June 2024	Mahendra Nath Pandey	BJP	Lost
77	Varanasi	1 June 2024	Narendra Modi	BJP	Won
78	Bhadohi	25 May 2024	Vinod Kumar Bind	BJP	Won
79	Mirzapur	1 June 2024	Anupriya Patel	AD(S)	Won
80	Robertsganj (SC)	1 June 2024	Rinki Kol	AD(S)	Lost

== Uttarakhand ==
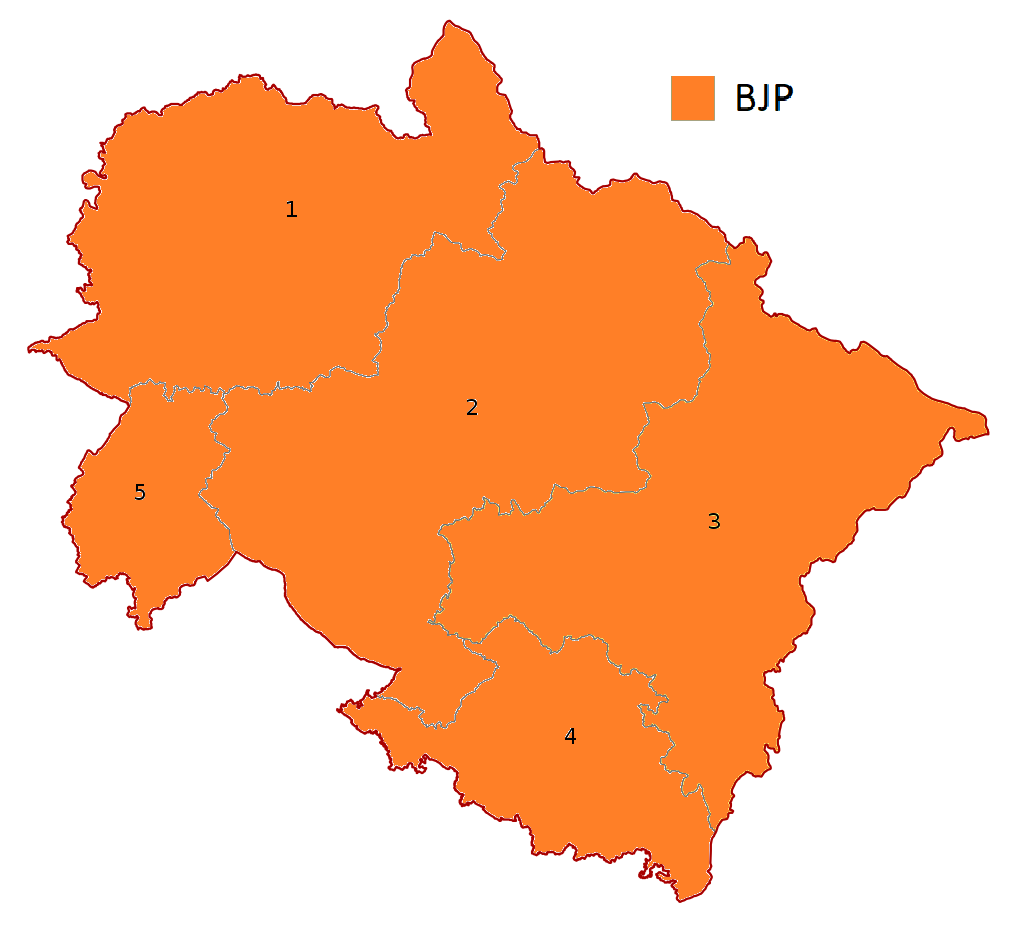

BJP (5)

Constituency		Poll On	Candidate		Result
1	Tehri Garhwal	19 April 2024	Mala Rajya Laxmi Shah	BJP	Won
2	Garhwal	19 April 2024	Anil Baluni	BJP	Won
3	Almora (SC)	19 April 2024	Ajay Tamta	BJP	Won
4	Nainital–Udhamsingh Nagar	19 April 2024	Ajay Bhatt	BJP	Won
5	Haridwar	19 April 2024	Trivendra Singh Rawat	BJP	Won

== West Bengal ==
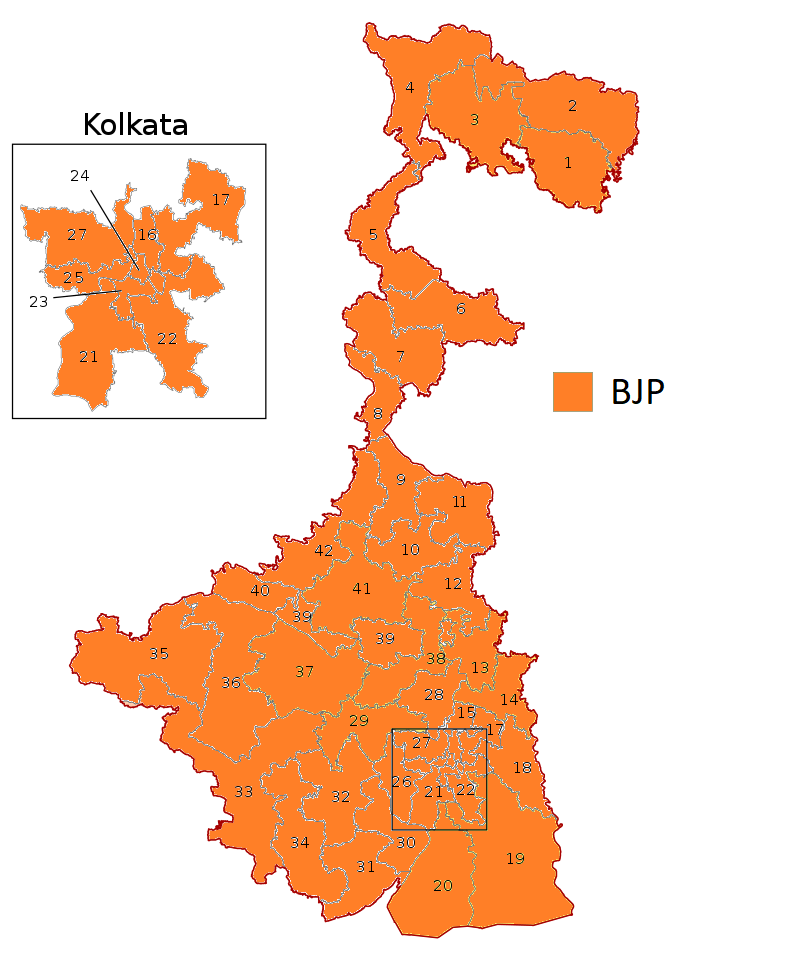

BJP (42)

#	Constituency	Poll On	Candidate	Party	Result
1	Cooch Behar (SC)	19 April 2024	Nisith Pramanik	BJP	Lost
2	Alipurduars (ST)	19 April 2024	Manoj Tigga	BJP	Won
3	Jalpaiguri (SC)	19 April 2024	Jayanta Kumar Roy	BJP	Won
4	Darjeeling	26 April 2024	Raju Bista	BJP	Won
5	Raiganj	26 April 2024	Kartik Paul	BJP	Won
6	Balurghat	26 April 2024	Sukanta Majumdar	BJP	Won
7	Maldaha Uttar	7 May 2024	Khagen Murmu	BJP	Won
8	Maldaha Dakshin	7 May 2024	Sreerupa Mitra Chowdhury	BJP	Lost
9	Jangipur	7 May 2024	Dhananjay Ghosh	BJP	Lost
10	Baharampur	13 May 2024	Nirmal Kumar Saha	BJP	Lost
11	Murshidabad	7 May 2024	Gouri Shankar Ghosh	BJP	Lost
12	Krishnanagar	13 May 2024	Amrita Roy	BJP	Lost
13	Ranaghat (SC)	13 May 2024	Jagannath Sarkar	BJP	Won
14	Bangaon (SC)	20 May 2024	Shantanu Thakur	BJP	Won
15	Barrackpore	20 May 2024	Arjun Singh	BJP	Lost
16	Dum Dum	1 June 2024	Shilbhadra Dutta	BJP	Lost
17	Barasat	1 June 2024	Swapan Majumder	BJP	Lost
18	Basirhat	1 June 2024	Rekha Patra	BJP	Lost
19	Jaynagar (SC)	1 June 2024	Ashok Kandari	BJP	Lost
20	Mathurapur (SC)	1 June 2024	Ashok Purakayet	BJP	Lost
21	Diamond Harbour	1 June 2024	Abhijit Das	BJP	Lost
22	Jadavpur	1 June 2024	Anirban Ganguly	BJP	Lost
23	Kolkata Dakshin	1 June 2024	Debasree Chaudhuri	BJP	Lost
24	Kolkata Uttar	1 June 2024	Tapas Roy	BJP	Lost
25	Howrah	20 May 2024	Rathin Chakraborty	BJP	Lost
26	Uluberia	20 May 2024	Arun Uday Paul Choudhary	BJP	Lost
27	Sreerampur	20 May 2024	Kabir Shankar Bose	BJP	Lost
28	Hooghly	20 May 2024	Locket Chatterjee	BJP	Lost
29	Arambagh (SC)	20 May 2024	Arup Kanti Digar	BJP	Lost
30	Tamluk	25 May 2024	Abhijit Gangopadhyay	BJP	Won
31	Kanthi	25 May 2024	Soumendu Adhikari	BJP	Won
32	Ghatal	25 May 2024	Hiran Chatterjee	BJP	Lost
33	Jhargram (ST)	25 May 2024	Pranat Tudu	BJP	Lost
34	Medinipur	25 May 2024	Agnimitra Paul	BJP	Lost
35	Purulia	25 May 2024	Jyotirmay Singh Mahato	BJP	Won
36	Bankura	25 May 2024	Subhash Sarkar	BJP	Lost
37	Bishnupur (SC)	25 May 2024	Saumitra Khan	BJP	Won
38	Bardhaman Purba (SC)	13 May 2024	Ashim Kumar Sarkar	BJP	Lost
39	Bardhaman-Durgapur	13 May 2024	Dilip Ghosh	BJP	Lost
40	Asansol	13 May 2024	S. S. Ahluwalia	BJP	Lost
41	Bolpur (SC)	13 May 2024	Priya Saha	BJP	Lost
42	Birbhum	13 May 2024	Debtanu Bhattacharya	BJP	Lost

== See also ==
List of National Democratic Alliance candidates in the 1998 Indian general election
List of National Democratic Alliance candidates in the 1999 Indian general election
List of National Democratic Alliance candidates in the 2004 Indian general election
List of National Democratic Alliance candidates in the 2009 Indian general election
List of National Democratic Alliance candidates in the 2014 Indian general election
List of National Democratic Alliance candidates in the 2019 Indian general election
List of National Democratic Alliance candidates in the 2024 Indian general election

- List of Indian National Developmental Inclusive Alliance candidates for the 2024 Indian general election
- List of Left Front candidates in the 2024 Indian general election
- List of Left Democratic Front candidates in the 2024 Indian general election
- Bharatiya Janata Party campaign for the 2024 Indian general election
