= Jaitaran Assembly constituency =

Legislative Assembly constituency in Rajasthan State, India

Coordinates: 26.2°N 73.94°E

Jaitaran
- Constituency No. 116 for the Rajasthan Legislative Assembly

Constituency details
- Country: India
- Region: North India
- State: Rajasthan
- District: Pali
- Lok Sabha constituency: Rajsamand
- Established: 1972
- Total electors: 308,939
- Reservation: None

Member of Legislative Assembly
- 16th Rajasthan Legislative Assembly
- Incumbent Avinash Gehlot
- Party: Bharatiya Janata Party

Jaitaran Assembly constituency is one of the 200 Legislative Assembly constituencies of Rajasthan state in India.

It is part of Pali district.

== Members of the Legislative Assembly ==
Election	Name	Party
2008	Dilip Choudhary	Independent
2013	Surendra Goyal	Bharatiya Janata Party
2018	Avinash Gehlot	Bharatiya Janata Party
2023	Avinash Gehlot	Bharatiya Janata Party

== Election results ==
=== 2023 ===
2023 Rajasthan Legislative Assembly election: Jaitaran
Party	Candidate	Votes	%	±%
BJP	Avinash Gehlot	66,277	31.05	−2.55
INC	Surendra Goyal	52,751	24.71	−2.65
Independent	Yogi Laxman Nath	40,539	18.99	
ASP(KR)	Dilip Choudhary	28,067	13.15	
Independent	Mukut Singh	19,108	8.95	+3.22
NOTA	None of the above	3,060	1.43	+1.02
Majority		13,526	6.34	+0.1
Turnout		213,467	69.1	−1.03
BJP hold		Swing		

=== 2018 ===
2013 Rajasthan Legislative Assembly election: Jaitaran
Party	Candidate	Votes	%	±%
BJP	Avinash Gehlot	65,607	33.6	
INC	Dilip Choudhary	53,419	27.36	
Independent	Krishan Singh Gurjar	19,112	9.79	
Independent	Surendra Goyal	17,684	9.06	
Independent	Mukut Singh	11,198	5.73	
Dalit Kranti Dal	Pukh Raj	10,203	5.22	
Independent	Rajesh Kumar Kumawat	5,931	3.04	
Independent	Vishnu Kumar Dadhich	1,774	0.91	
NOTA	None of the above	809	0.41	
Majority		12,188	6.24	
Turnout		195,273	70.13	

== See also ==
- List of constituencies of the Rajasthan Legislative Assembly
- Pali district
