= Mahima Kumari Mewar =

Indian politician

Member of Parliament, Lok Sabha
- Incumbent
- Assumed office 4 June 2024
- Preceded by: Diya Kumari
- Constituency: Rajsamand

Personal details
- Party: Bharatiya Janata Party
- Other political affiliations: National Democratic Alliance
- Spouse: Vishvaraj Singh Mewar

Mahima Kumari Mewar (Hindi pronunciation: [məɦɪmaː kʊmaːɾiː meːʋaːɽ]) is an Indian politician from Bharatiya Janata Party. She was elected as a Member of parliament from Rajsamand in the 2024 general election of India.

== Royal and political legacy ==
She is daughter of Maharaj Jagdishwari Prasad Singh Deo of Panchkote Zamindari estate situated on the Western Frontiers of Bengal and Rajmata Vidya Devi of Bandhi Talukdari in Madhya Pradesh, and has issues, one daughter and a son. She married Vishvaraj Singh Mewar, Maharana of Udaipur on 8 May 1997, and has issues, one daughter and a son. H.H Maharani Saheba, is also an Indian politician. She has been elected as a Member of parliament from Rajsamand in the 18th Lok Sabha of Union Government of India.

== See also ==
- 2024 Indian general election in Rajasthan
- List of NDA candidates for 2024 Indian general elections
