= Bhim Assembly constituency =

Legislative Assembly constituency in Rajasthan State, India

Coordinates: 25.74°N 74.08°E

Bhim
- Constituency No. 173 for the Rajasthan Legislative Assembly

Constituency details
- Country: India
- Region: North India
- State: Rajasthan
- District: Rajsamand
- Lok Sabha constituency: Rajsamand
- Established: 1972
- Total electors: 231,185
- Reservation: None

Member of Legislative Assembly
- 16th Rajasthan Legislative Assembly
- Incumbent Harisingh Rawat
- Party: Bharatiya Janata Party

Bhim Assembly constituency is one of the 200 Legislative Assembly constituencies of Rajasthan state in India.

It comprises Bhim tehsil and Deogarh tehsil, both in Rajsamand district. As of 2023, its representative is Harisingh Rawat of the Bharatiya Janata Party.

== Members of the Legislative Assembly ==
Election	Name	Party
1998	Lakshman Singh Rawat	Indian National Congress
2003	Hari Singh Rawat	Bharatiya Janata Party
2008	Hari Singh Rawat	Bharatiya Janata Party
2013	Hari Singh Rawat	Bharatiya Janata Party
2018	Sudarshan Singh	Indian National Congress
2023	Hari Singh Rawat	Bharatiya Janata Party

== Election results ==
=== 2023 ===
2023 Rajasthan Legislative Assembly election: Bhim
Party	Candidate	Votes	%	±%
BJP	Harisingh Rawat S/O Panna Singh	93,905	57.46	+24.87
INC	Sudarshan Singh Rawat S/O Lakshman Singh	62,137	38.02	+2.78
NOTA	None of the above	1,548	0.95	−0.41
Majority		31,768	19.44	+16.79
Turnout		163,428	70.69	+3.62
BJP gain from INC		Swing		

=== 2018 ===
Rajasthan Legislative Assembly Election, 2018: Bhim
Party	Candidate	Votes	%	±%
INC	Sudarshan Singh	49,355	35.24	
BJP	Hari Singh Chouhan (Rawat)	45,641	32.59	
Independent	Ajay Soni	35,722	25.5	
Independent	Hari Singh S/O Panna Singh	1,414	1.01	
NOTA	None of the above	1,904	1.36	
Majority		3,714	2.65	
Turnout		140,064	67.07	

== See also ==
- List of constituencies of the Rajasthan Legislative Assembly
- Rajsamand district
