= Harisingh Rawat =

Indian politician

Hari Singh Rawat
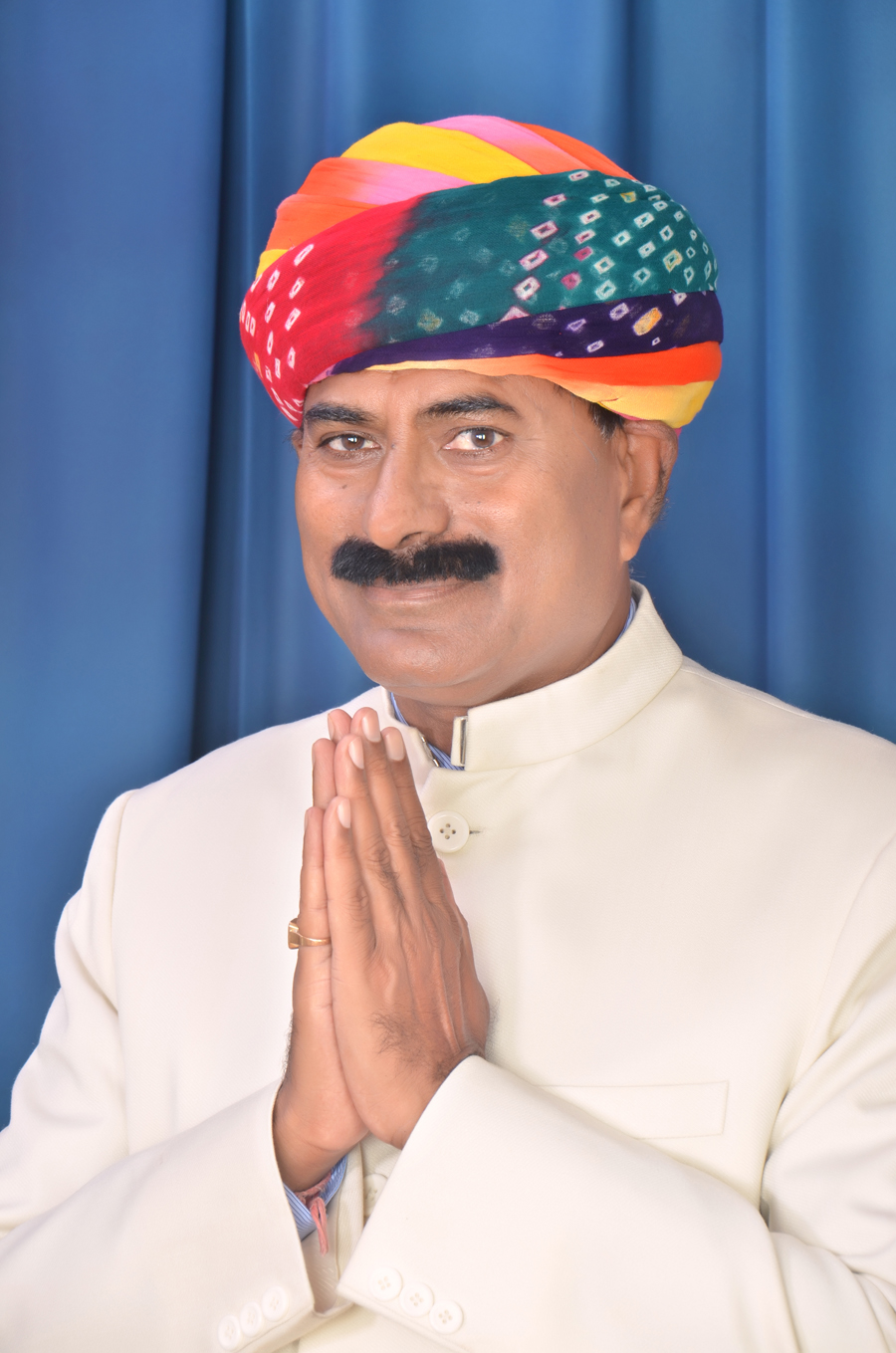

Member of the 16th Rajasthan Legislative Assembly, Bhim
- Incumbent
- Assumed office 2023
- Preceded by: Sudarshan Singh Rawat
- Constituency: Bhim

Member of the Rajasthan Legislative Assembly, Bhim
- In office 2003–2018
- Preceded by: Laxman Singh Rawat
- Succeeded by: Sudarshan Singh Rawat
- Constituency: Bhim

Personal details
- Born: Bhim
- Party: Bharatiya Janata Party
- Profession: Politician

Hari Singh Rawat (born 26 May 1955) is an Indian politician currently serving as a member of the 16th Rajasthan Legislative Assembly, representing the Bhim constituency. He is a member of the Bharatiya Janata Party, who previously served as a member of the 12th, 13th, and 14th Rajasthan Legislative Assembly from the Bhim constituency and in the Indian Army from 1976 to 1981.

== Early life ==
Hari Singh Rawat was born on 26 May 1955 in Bhim, Rajsamand in Rajasthan.

== Political career ==
He served as an MLA from the Bhim constituency from 2003 to 2008, then again from 2008 to 2013, and later from 2013 to 2018.

Following the 2023 Rajasthan Legislative Assembly election, he was re-elected as an MLA from the Bhim constituency, defeating Sudarshan Singh Rawat, the candidate from the Indian National Congress (INC), by a margin of 31,768 votes.
