= Gopal Singh Shekhawat =

Indian politician

Gopal Singh Shekhawat गोपाल सिंह शेखावत

Member of Parliament, Lok Sabha
- In office 2009–2014
- Constituency: Rajsamand

Personal details
- Born: 17 January 1951 (age 75) Edwa, Nagaur, Rajasthan.
- Party: Bharatiya Janata Party (2024- Present)
- Other political affiliations: Indian National Congress (till 2024)
- Spouse: Ganesh Kanwar
- Children: 5

Gopal Singh Shekhawat, also known as Gopal Singh Idwa, is an Indian politician and the former Lok Sabha member, who represented Rajsamand constituency of Rajasthan state as the Member of the Bhartiya Janata Party.

== Education ==
Gopal Sungh has completed his Bachelor of Arts from Jaipur National University in 1971. Later, in 1974, he did his Bachelor of Laws from University of Rajasthan and Secondary education from Board of Secondary Education, Rajasthan in 1966.

== Life and background ==
Gopal Singh, vice-president and party in-charge of Congress Chittorgarh district unit was born on 17 January 1951 in Edwa village of Nagaur district of Rajasthan. He is married to "Ganesh Kanwar" and are blessed with three sons and two daughters. From 2009 - 2014, Singh served as the member of parliament elections held during the 15th Lok Sabha session. He is son of "Narayan Singh" and "Dariao Kanwar", where Dariao Kanwar is the mother of Gopal.
