= Avinash Gehlot =

Indian politician (born 1981)

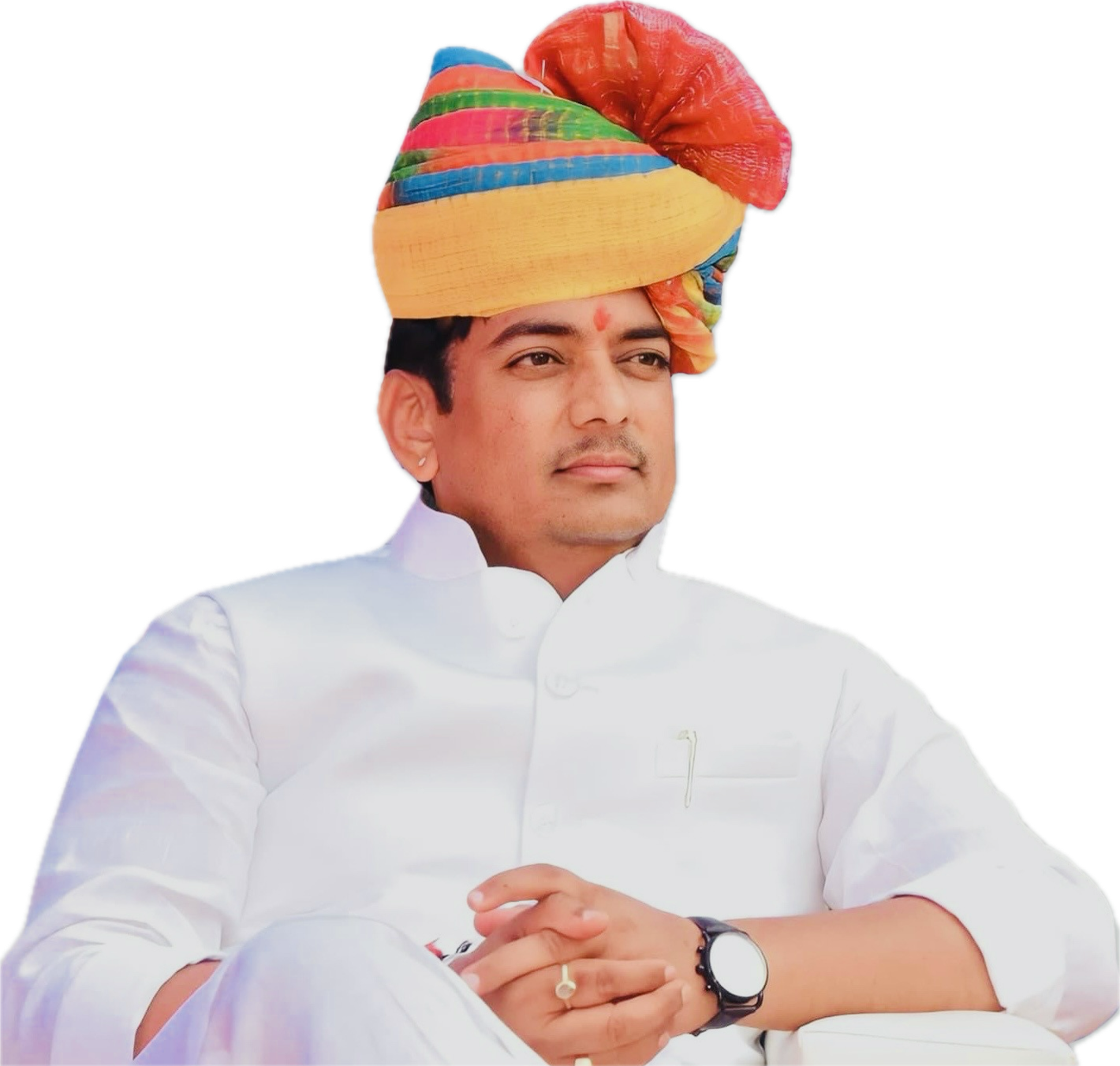

Cabinet Minister, Government of Rajasthan
- Incumbent
- Assumed office 30 December 2023
- Governor: Kalraj Mishra; Haribhau Bagade
- Chief Minister: Bhajan Lal Sharma
- Ministry and Departments: List: Social Justice & Empowerment
- Preceded by: Tika Ram Jully

Member of the Rajasthan Legislative Assembly
- Incumbent
- Assumed office 2018
- Preceded by: Surendra Goyal
- Constituency: Jaitaran

Personal details
- Born: 9 December 1981 (age 44) Jaitaran, Pali District, Rajasthan, India
- Party: Bharatiya Janata Party
- Spouse: Meera Gehlot
- Children: 2
- Education: M.A., B.P.Ed. & L.L.B
- Profession: advocate

Avinash Gehlot (born 9 December 1981) is an Indian politician currently serving as the Cabinet Minister of Social Justice & Empowerment Department in Government of Rajasthan. He is a member of 15th and 16th Rajasthan Legislative Assembly from Jaitaran. He is a member of the Bhartiya Janta Party.

== Early life ==
Gehlot hails from Jaitaran, Pali. His father is Nathu Ram Gehlot. He belongs to सैनिक क्षत्रिय. According to the educational qualification mentioned in his election affidavit, he has gained his BA degree from Maharshi Dayanand Saraswati University, Ajmer (Raj.) and LL.B from Maharaja Ganga Singh University, Bikaner (Raj.). He initially engaged in the readymade garments business. Subsequently, he became associated with the BJP and RSS. In 2010, he entered the Municipality elections, vying for the position of chairman. Although he faced defeat, his political involvement intensified thereafter. In 2018, he was nominated as the candidate from the Jaitaran constituency. He emerged victorious in both the 2018 and 2023 elections in the same constituency.

== Political career ==
He contested the Rajasthan legislative assembly elections in 2018 from Jaitaran, Pali on a ticket of Bharatiya Janta Party (BJP) and won. He won the election from the same constituency for the second time in 2023 Rajasthan Legislative Assembly Election with a huge margin of votes. On 30 December 2023, he took oath as a Cabinet Minister of the Government of Rajasthan.
