= Kumbhariya, Banaskantha district =

Kumbhariya
- village
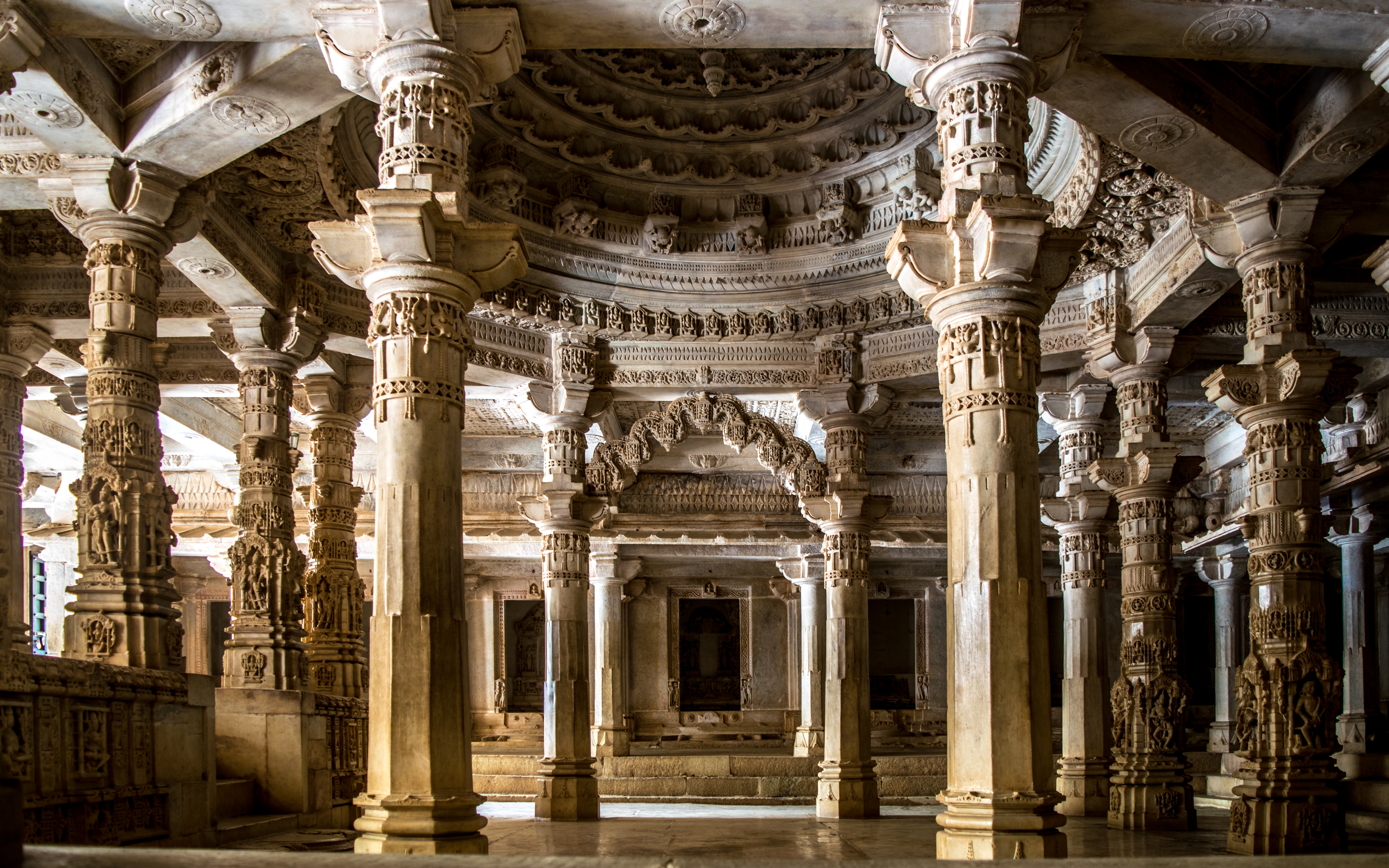
- Interior of the Mahavira Temple, 1062

- Location in Gujarat, India Kumbhariya (India) Kumbhariya (Asia)
- Coordinates: 24.325361°N 72.862334°E
- Country: India
- State: Gujarat
- District: Banaskantha district
- Panchayat: Gram Panchayat
- Founder: Rana Kumbha

Population (2011)
  - Total: 3,482

Languages
  - Official: Gujarati
- Time zone: UTC+5:30 (IST)
- PIN: 385110
- Vehicle registration: GJ
- Distance from Palanpur: 101 kilometres (63 mi)
- Distance from Ahmedabad: 130 kilometres (81 mi)
- Website: gujaratindia.com

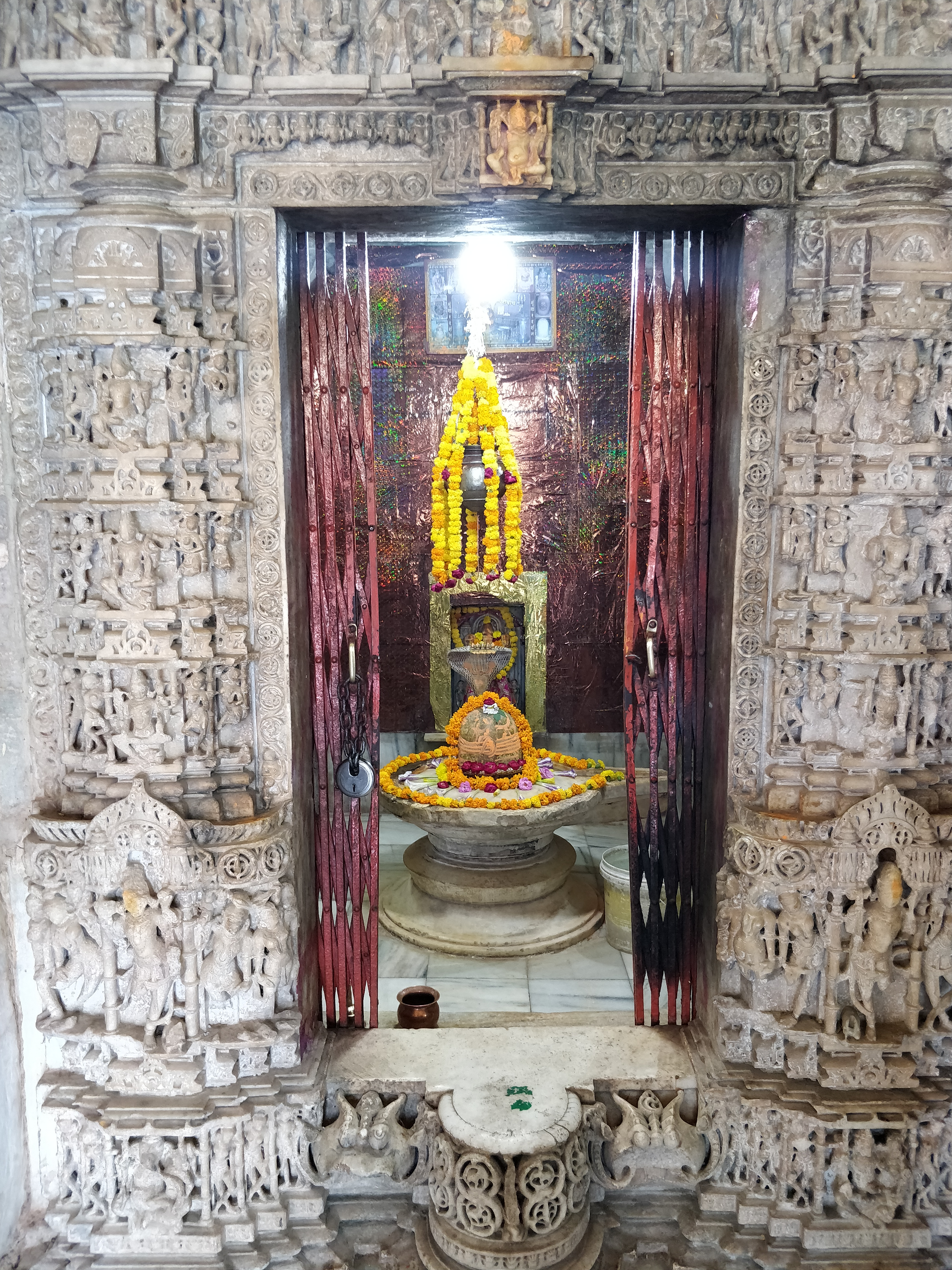
Sanctum and lingam of the Mahadev (Shiva) Temple

Kumbhariya is a village of historical, archaeological and religious importance with cultural heritage in Danta Taluka of Banaskantha district, Gujarat, India.

It is notable for five medieval Jain temples, built between 1062 and 1231, similar in design and typical of the Jain Māru-Gurjara architecture style. The Hindu Shiva Kumbheshwar Mahadev Temple is of similar date and style.

== Location ==
It is located at a distance of 1.7 km from Ambaji. Kumbhariya village is located in Taluka, Danta of Banaskantha, North Gujarat, India .

== History ==
It has historical Jain temple of Neminatha which dates back to the 13th century. The Kumbhariya Jain temple of Shri Neminatha Bhagwan is now heritage center in Gujarat. The area was earlier known by name of Arasur and the village is said to have been founded and named after Rana Kumbha of Mewar in the 15th century.

== Demography ==
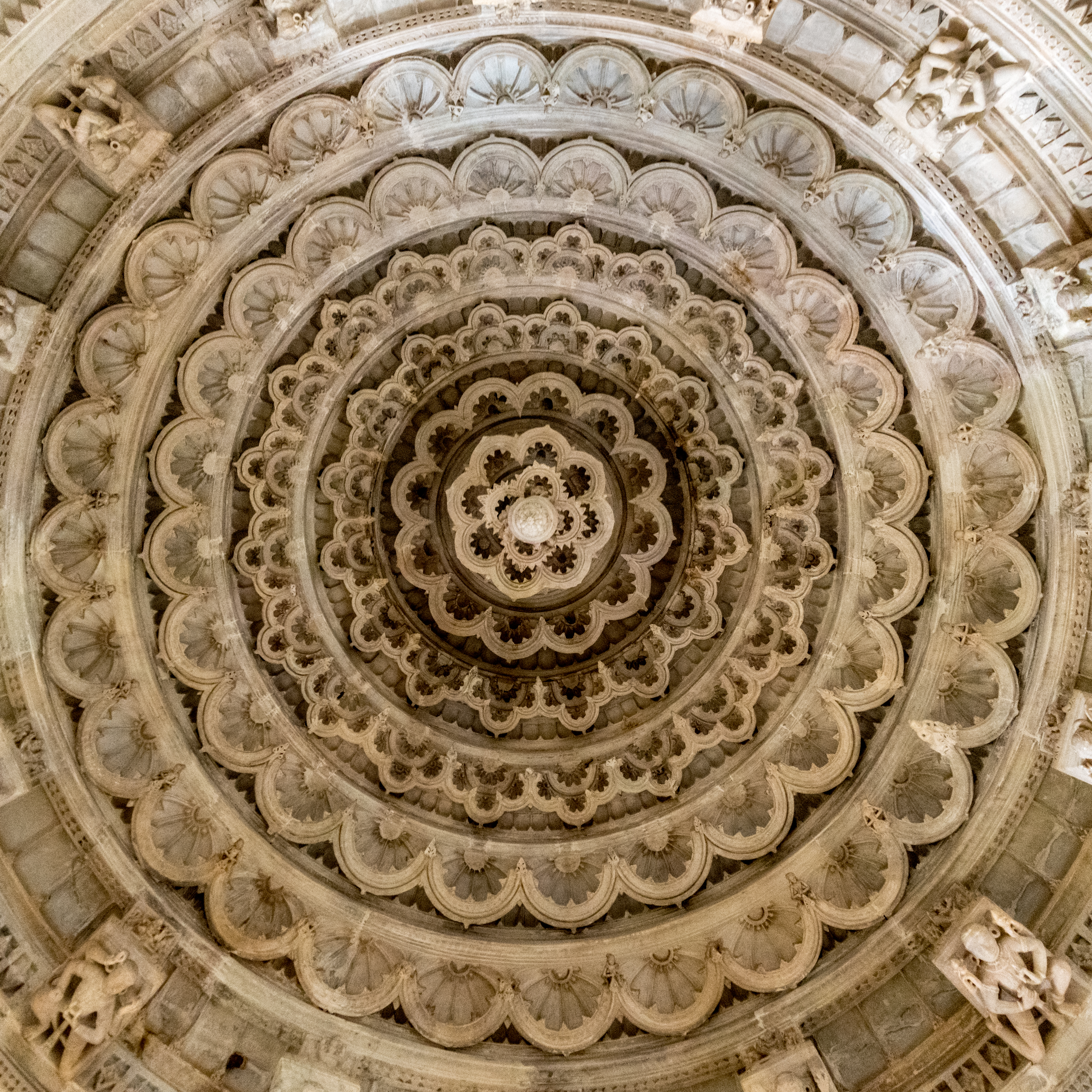
Ceiling rosette of the Mahavira Jain temple, 1062

As of 2011 Indian Census, Kumbhariya had a total population of 3,482, of which 1,772 were males and 1,710 were females. Population within the age group of 0 to 6 years was 683. The total population of literates in Kumbhariya was 1,395, which constituted 40.1% of the population, of which males were at 49.3% and females were 30.5%. The effective literacy rate of 7+ population was 49.8%. The Scheduled Castes and Scheduled Tribes population was 30 and 1,849 respectively. Kumbhariya had 671 households in 2011.

== Climate ==
Kumbhariya village enjoys all types of weather. In Summer, it's hot and humid and temperature remains between 26 and 46 °C Degrees with hot winds. In Winter, the temperature ranges between 10 and 36 degrees Celsius during this period, which is quite cold and best time and in Monsoon Season, the average rainfall is about 15 to 30 inches per season, sometimes even heavy rainfall. Kumbhariya village because of Ambaji is at 480 m of altitude. Therefore, weather remains relatively pleasant throughout the year.

== Economy ==
The population is largely dependent on marginal work or as agricultural labour with only about 249 were cultivators, who own their farms.

== Education ==
The village Kumbhariya also houses educational institute Shree Ambaji Arts College managed by Shree Arasuri Ambaji Mata Devasthan Trust, Ambaji established in 1991

=== Higher education ===
- Shree Ambaji Arts College

=== Schools ===
- Carmel English High School
- Adarsh Nivashi Secondary School
- Arasuri Ambaji Sanskrit Pathshala

== Temples ==
=== Jain temples ===
The five Jain temples are close together. The Mahavira temple has an elaborate interior, similar to the Dilwara Jain Temples of Mount Abu, not far away. It dates to 1062. South of it, the Parshvanatha Temple of 1105 is slightly larger and at least as elaborately decorated. To the north are the Shantinatha Temple of 1082, the Neminatha Temple of 1134 (and later), and the smaller Sambhavanatha Temple of 1231.

=== Hindu temple ===
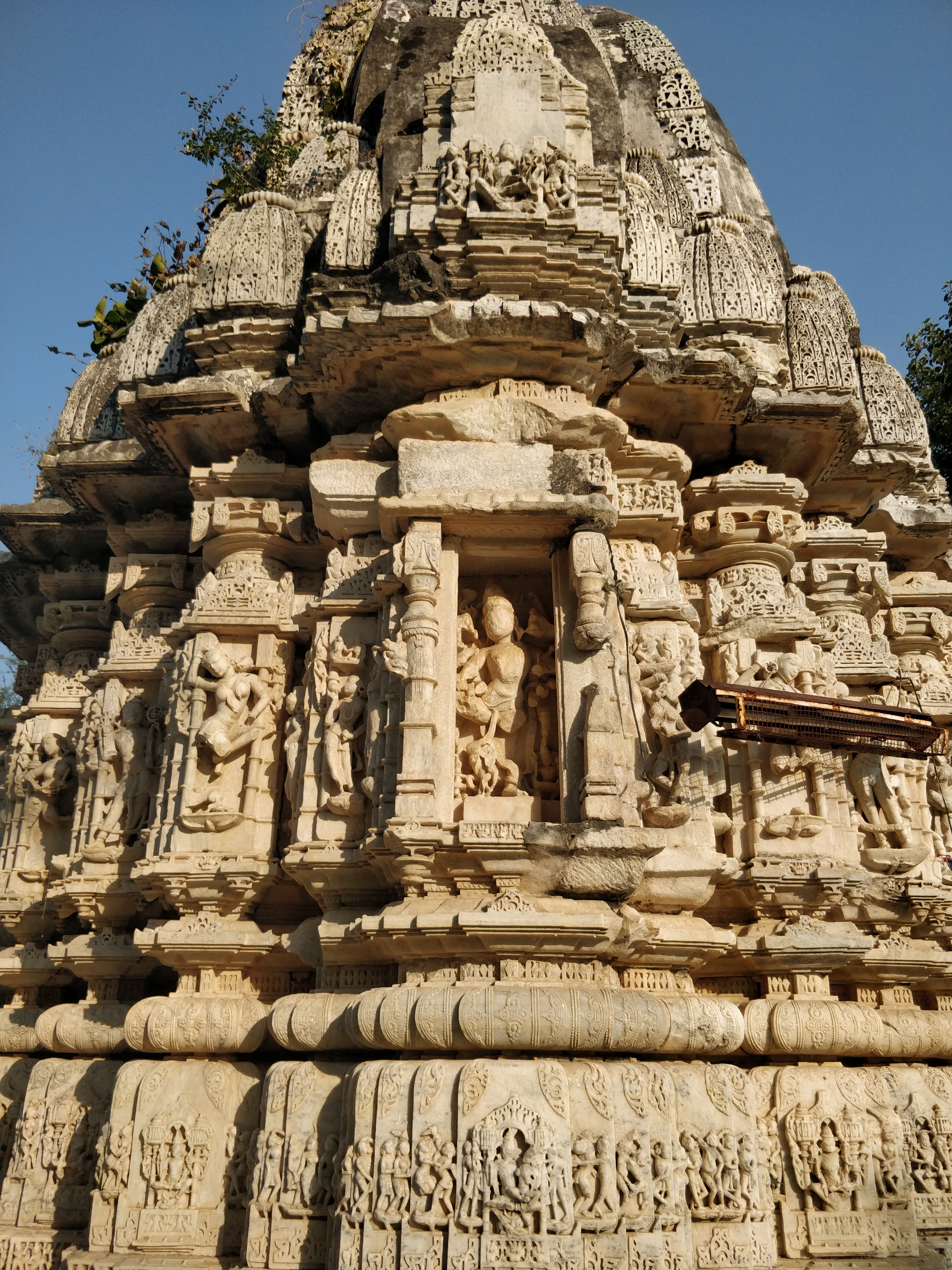
Rear of the Mahadev Temple

There are ancient temples dedicated to Amba or Chamunda and Shiva - the temples of Chamunda Mata and Someshwar Mahadev, respectively, near the river stream. The Kumbhariya Mahadev temple is State Protected Monument (S-GJ-11).

== Transportation ==
As Ambaji town is nearest which one and half km away from village Kumbhariya, there is a bus-station at Ambaji of Gujarat State Road Transport Corporation (GSRTC) connecting to all major cities of India, and a railway station is at Palanpur, Banaskantha district, North Gujarat.

=== Road ===
As Ambaji town is nearest which one and half km away from village Kumbhariya, there is a bus-station at Ambaji. Kumbhariya can be reached through Himatnagar road which is connected with National Highway 48 (Mumbai to Delhi). The other road which passes through Palanpur and Danta and connects with State Highway SH 56 to reach Ambaji.

=== Rail ===
The nearest railway station of Gujarat is at Palanpur Junction which comes under the administrative control of Western Railway zone of the Indian Railways. It has direct rail links on the broad gauge to the cities of Chennai, Thiruvananthapuram, Mysore, Bangalore, Pune, Mumbai, Jaipur, Jodhpur, Delhi, Dehradun, Muzaffarpur, Bareilly and Jammu. It is connected to most of the cities and towns in Gujarat such as Ahmedabad, Surat, Vadodara, Bhuj, Rajkot, Jamnagar and Porbandar. Indian Railways' proposal to double the broad gauge line between Palanpur and Samakhiali has received government backing. The doubling will benefit the districts of Kutch, Patan and Banaskantha in the state of Gujarat. The other way of nearest Railway station is at Abu Road which is 22 km away from Ambaji.

=== Air ===
As Ambaji town is nearest which one and half km away from village Kumbhariya. The nearest Airport is the Deesa Airport (also spelled Disa Airport), an airport in Deesa, Gujarat but this airport is not working nowadays, originally built for Palanpur. it is just 82 km from Palanpur city. The nearest International Airport is Sardar Vallabhbhai Patel International Airport, Ahmedabad which is 179 km far from Ambaji Temple Town.

== Sources ==
- Michell, George (1990), The Penguin Guide to the Monuments of India, Volume 1: Buddhist, Jain, Hindu, 1990, Penguin Books, ISBN 0140081445
