= Ambaji Fair =

Ambaji Fair Ambaji Fair
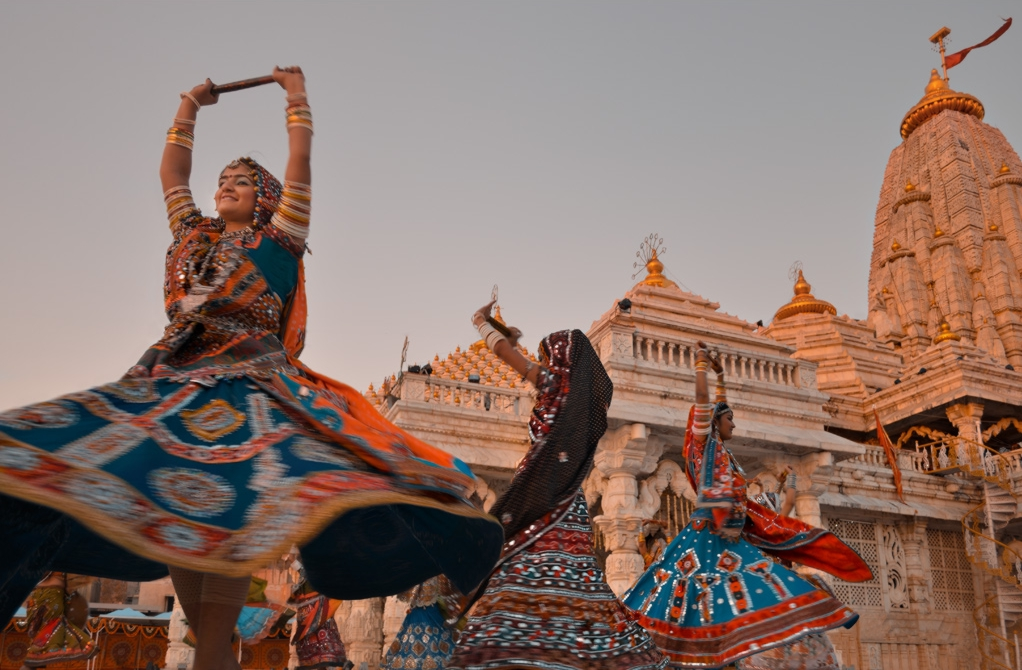
- Scene of Ras Garba in Chachar Chowk
- Genre: Cultural and religious festival
- Frequency: Annual
- Locations: Ambaji Village, Banaskantha district, Gujarat
- Country: India
- Attendance: More than 3 lakh devotees

Ambaji Fair is held at Ambaji in Danta taluka of Banaskantha district. Ambaji, 50 km away from Palanpur, creates the same atmosphere as every Poonam fair. But all, big fairs are held here on Purnima of Kaartik, Chaitra, Bhadarvo and Asho(Ashwina) months. In which 'Bhadarvi Purnima's fair' is a very important and big fair.

== Time ==
This fair of Bhadarvi Poonam is held for three consecutive days namely Teras(Thrayodashi), Chaudas(Chaturdashi) and Poonam(Purnima). On these days, millions of people flock to see the Goddess. At this time many people come here on foot.

== Significance ==
Here the devotees recite the Shakradya hymns aloud and pray to Mataji. On the day of Purnima, Goddess is adorned with various decorations. Then Brahmins recite Saptashati. On Bhadarvi Poonam Devotees of Ambaji Goddess come from Gujarat as well as from other states of the country and abroad. No idol or picture is worshiped in the temple but 'Shri Visayantra' is worshiped.

Poshi Poonam(Paush Purnima), which is believed to be the day Mataji appeared. Even on the days of Chaitra Poonam and Sharad Purnima, people perform rituals and worship and Yajna, and fairs are also held. On the day of Purnima, various associations come to pay homage to Mataji. Bhavai and Ras Garba are wonderfully organized by them in Chachar Chowk.

Here in the temple premises, the devotees of Mataji play nice rasgarba to the beat of drums. More than 3 lakh devotees come to see Mataji in this Maha Mela(big fair) of Ambaji. All the roads leading to Ambaji are full of pilgrims during these holy days.

The entire temple premises and Ambaji village are also decorated on this occasion. A grand procession of Mataji is also drawn. Now every Sunday also a fair-like atmosphere is created at Ambaji.

== Facilities ==
On the day of Bhadarvi Poonam, there is a huge influx of visitors to the temple and the fair. Along the way, a large number of shops selling Prasadi, Chundadi, Shrifal, kanku, pushpa etc. are seen. Crowds are also seen in sari shops to pay homage to Mataji. Food stalls are also set up on a temporary basis. The tribal women of the area are fond of tattoos and bangles. A variety of toy shops are also set up.

Pilgrims are provided with rest, tea, snacks and meals by various organizations and service centers. Necessary facilities are provided to the people by Shri Ambaji Devasthan Trust and Banaskantha District Administration during the days of the fair and also at other times. Hospital facilities are also available here for the health of the people.
