= Malgadh =

Village in Gujarat state, India

Coordinates: 24.269°N 72.146°E

Malgadh is a village in Deesa of Banaskantha district in Gujarat, India.
