= 2014 Indian general election in Gujarat =

General election for Gujarat

Indian general election in Gujarat, 2014
- April–May 2014

26 seats
- Turnout: 63.66% (▲15.76%)

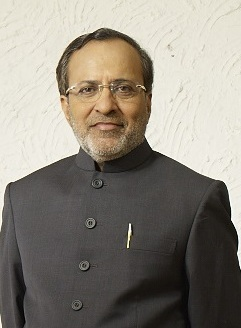
	First party	Second party
Leader	Narendra Modi	Arjun Modhwadia
Party	BJP	INC
Alliance	NDA	UPA
Leader's seat	Vadodara (won, vacated) (Note: He had also contested in Varanasi in Uttar Pradesh, which he won and retained that seat, vacating Vadodara.)	Did Not Contest
Last election	15 seats	11 seats
Seats won	26	0
Seat change	▲11	▼11
- Seatwise Result Map of the 2014 general election in Gujarat
Prime Minister before election
Manmohan Singh
INC
Prime Minister after election
Narendra Modi
BJP

In the 2014 Indian general election for Gujarat that were held for 26 seats in the state, the major two contenders in the state were Bharatiya Janta Party (BJP) and the Indian National Congress (INC). BJP won all 26 seats.

== Election schedule ==
The polling schedule for the 2014 General Elections was announced by the Chief Election Commissioner on 5 March 2014.

Poll event	Phase
Poll event	VII
Notification date	2 April
Last date for filing nomination	9 April
Scrutiny of nomination	10 April
Last Date for withdrawal of nomination	12 April
Date of poll	30 April
Date of counting of votes/Result	16 May 2014

== Parties and alliances ==
=== National Democratic Alliance ===
Party	Flag	Symbol	Leader	Seats contested
Bharatiya Janata Party			Narendra Modi	26

=== United Progressive Alliance ===
Party	Flag	Symbol	Leader	Seats contested
Indian National Congress			Arjun Modhwadia	25
Nationalist Congress Party			Sharad Pawar	1

== Results ==
=== Results by Party/Alliance ===
Party/Alliance		Popular vote			Seats		
Party/Alliance		Votes	%	±pp	Contested	Won	+/−
BJP		1,52,49,243	59.05	▲12.53	26	26	▲11
UPA	INC	84,86,083	32.86	▼10.52	25	0	▼11
UPA	NCP	2,40,466	0.93		1	0	
UPA	Total	87,26,549	33.79	Steady	26	0	Steady
AAP		3,01,558	1.17	New entry	24	0	Steady
BSP		2,43,949	0.94		24	0	
JD(U)		1,01,660	0.39		12	0	
Others		2,04,153	0.79	Steady	64	0	Steady
IND		5,36,024	2.08		157	0	Steady
NOTA		4,26,070	1.72	Steady	26	Steady	Steady
Total		2,58,24,003	100%	-	334	4	-

=== Constituency wise ===
Constituency		Winner				Runner Up				Margin	%
#	Name	Candidate	Party	Votes	%	Candidate	Party	Votes	%	Margin	%
1	Kachchh	Vinodbhai Chavda	BJP	562,855	59.40	Dinesh Parmar	INC	308,373	32.55	254,482	26.85
2	Banaskantha	Haribhai Chaudhary	BJP	507,856	57.23	Joitabhai Patel	INC	305,522	34.43	202,334	22.80
3	Patan	Liladhar Vaghela	BJP	518,538	54.21	Bhavsinh Rathod	INC	379,819	39.70	138,719	14.51
4	Mahesana	Jayshreeben Patel	BJP	580,250	57.78	Jivabhai Patel	INC	371,359	36.98	208,891	20.80
5	Sabarkantha	Dipsinh Rathod	BJP	552,205	50.39	Shankersinh Vaghela	INC	467,750	42.68	84,455	7.71
6	Gandhinagar	L. K. Advani	BJP	773,539	68.03	Kiritbhai Ishvarbhai Patel	INC	290,418	25.54	483,121	42.49
7	Ahmedabad East	Paresh Rawal	BJP	633,582	64.22	PrahladSingh Patel	INC	306,949	31.11	326,633	33.11
8	Ahmedabad West	Kirit Solanki	BJP	617,104	63.91	Ishwarbahi Makwana	INC	296,793	30.74	320,311	33.17
9	Surendranagar	Devajibhai Fatepara	BJP	529,003	55.95	Somabhai Patel	INC	326,096	34.49	202,907	21.46
10	Rajkot	Mohan Kundariya	BJP	621,524	58.76	Kunwarjibhai Bavaliya	INC	375,096	35.46	246,428	23.30
11	Porbandar	Vitthal Radadiya	BJP	508,437	62.77	Kandhal Jadeja	NCP	240,466	29.69	267,971	33.08
12	Jamnagar	Poonamben Maadam	BJP	484,412	56.79	Vikrambhai Madam	INC	309,123	36.24	175,289	20.55
13	Junagadh	Rajesh Chudasama	BJP	513,179	54.46	Punjabhai Vansh	INC	377,347	40.05	135,832	14.41
14	Amreli	Naranbhai Kachhadia	BJP	436,715	53.94	Virjibhai Thummar	INC	280,483	34.64	156,232	19.30
15	Bhavnagar	Bharti Shiyal	BJP	549,529	59.85	Pravin Rathod	INC	254,041	27.67	295,488	32.18
16	Anand	Dilip Patel	BJP	490,829	50.54	Bharatsinh Solanki	INC	427,403	44.00	63,426	6.54
17	Kheda	Devusinh Chauhan	BJP	568,235	59.35	Dinsha Patel	INC	335,334	35.02	232,901	24.33
18	Panchmahal	Prabhatsinh Chauhan	BJP	508,274	54.36	Ramsinh Parmar	INC	337,678	36.11	170,596	18.25
19	Dahod	Jasvantsinh Bhabhor	BJP	511,111	56.70	Prabha Taviad	INC	280,757	31.15	230,354	25.55
20	Vadodara	Narendra Modi	BJP	845,464	72.75	Madhusudan Mistry	INC	275,336	23.69	570,128	49.06
21	Chhota Udaipur	Ramsinh Rathwa	BJP	607,916	55.18	Naranbhai Rathwa	INC	428,187	38.87	179,729	16.31
22	Bharuch	Mansukhbhai Vasava	BJP	548,902	51.73	Jayeshbhai Patel	INC	395,629	37.29	153,273	14.44
23	Bardoli	Parbhubhai Vasava	BJP	622,769	51.49	Tushar Chaudhary	INC	498,885	41.24	123,884	10.25
24	Surat	Darshana Jardosh	BJP	718,412	75.75	Naishadhbhai Desai	INC	185,222	19.53	533,190	56.22
25	Navsari	C. R. Patil	BJP	820,831	70.67	Maksud Mirza	INC	262,715	22.62	558,116	48.05
26	Valsad	K. C. Patel	BJP	617,772	55.00	Kishanbhai Patel	INC	409,768	36.48	208,004	18.52

== Post-election Union Council of Ministers from Gujarat ==
#	Name	Constituency	Designation	Department	From	To	Party

== Assembly segments wise lead of parties ==
Party	Assembly segments	Position in Assembly (as of 2012)
Bharatiya Janata Party	165	115
Indian National Congress	17	61
Others	–	6
Total	182	

== Bye-election ==
No	Constituency	Turnout	Winner	Party	Margin
20	Vadodara	45.57	Ranjanben Bhatt (Elected on 16 September 2014)	Bharatiya Janata Party	3,29,507
