= Nanosana =

- village
- Location in Gujarat, India Nanosana (India)
- Coordinates: 23.9868500°N 72.4434300°E
- Country: India
- State: Gujarat
- District: Banaskantha

Languages
  - Official: Gujarati, Hindi
- Time zone: UTC+5:30 (IST)
- Vehicle registration: GJ
- Website: gujaratindia.com

Nanosana is a small village in India, situated in Banaskantha district in northern Gujarat, India. Administratively, it is in Vadgam Taluka near post Nandotra. The population of the village is around 1750. The main business of the people is agriculture and dairy farming.

Nanosana is at distance of 13 km from Vadgam, 30 km from Palanpur and 13 Km from Siddhpur. The nearby villages include Pasvadal, Nandotra, Gidasan, Rupal, Fatehgarh.
