= Vadgam =

- Taluka
- Location in Gujarat, India Vadgam (India)
- Coordinates: 24°5′0″N 72°29′0″E
- Country: India
- State: Gujarat
- District: Patan (Separated in 2010); Banaskantha district (2011 present)

Languages
  - Official: Gujarati, Hindi
- Time zone: UTC+5:30 (IST)
- Telephone code: 02739
- Vehicle registration: GJ 8
- Nearest city: Palanpur
- Lok Sabha constituency: Patan
- Vidhan Sabha constituency: Vadgam
- Website: http://vadgam.com/

Vadgam is located in India, situated in Banaskantha district in northern Gujarat. Administratively, it is a Taluka. There are 110 villages under this Taluka. Vadgam region also known as a Dhandhar.

== Geography ==
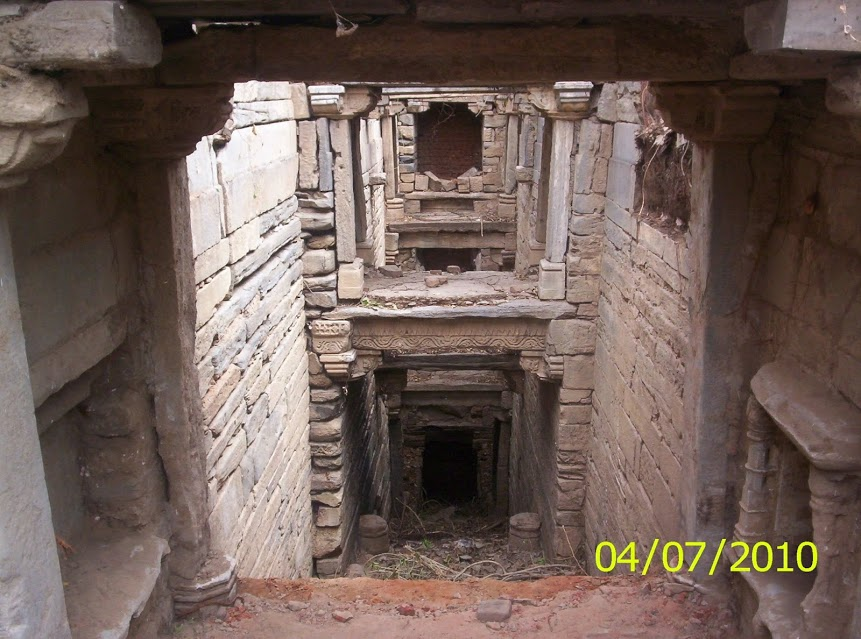
Stepwell of Vadgam

Vadgam is situated between Kheralu and Palanpur, 15 km away from Palanpur the main city of the Banaskantha District. It is a commercial place for the surrounding the villages Memadpur, Kodaram, Pilucha, Rupal, Gola, Parakhadi, Magarwada, Nandotra, Majadar, Gidasan and Nanosana. average raindrop in vadgam region is 706mm.

== Notable people ==
• Galbabhai Nanjibhai Patel(Chaudhary), Social Leader of Banaskantha District (Founder Chairman of Banas Dairy and well known Personality among Farmers community of Banaskantha and North Gujarat)

== Nearby places of interest ==
- Ambaji: 50 km
- Palanpur : 16km
