= Dharshibhai Khanpura =

Indian politician (died 2020)

Member of Gujarat Legislative Assembly
- In office 2012–2017
- Preceded by: Babubhai Desai
- Succeeded by: Kirtisinh Vaghela
- Constituency: Kankrej
- In office 2002–2007
- Preceded by: Magansinh Vaghela
- Succeeded by: Babubhai Desai
- Constituency: Kankrej
- In office 1990–1998
- Preceded by: Jayantilal Virchand Shah
- Succeeded by: Magansinh Vaghela
- Constituency: Kankrej

Personal details
- Died: 3 November 2020 U. N. Mehta Hospital, Ahmedabad, Gujarat
- Party: Indian National Congress
- Other political affiliations: Janata Dal (Gujarat)

Dharshibhai Lakhabhai Khanpura (died 3 November 2020) was an Indian politician from Gujarat. He was a former member of Gujarat Legislative Assembly represented Kankrej.

== Biography ==
Dharshibhai Khanpura was a native of Vada village in Banaskantha district of Gujarat. He had studied till grade 4.

Khanpura served as a member of the Gujarat Legislative Assembly representing the Kankrej constituency four times. He was first elected to assembly in 1990 as a member of Janata Dal followed by in 1995, 2002 and 2012 as a member of Indian National Congress. He won in the 2012 election with the lead of only 600 votes.

Khanpura contracted COVID-19 and was transported to the U. N. Mehta Hospital in Ahmedabad. On 3 November 2020, he died at the age of 80.
