= Sanval =

Sanval may refer to:

- Sanval, India, a village in India
- Sanval, brand name of the drug Zolpidem
