= Dhanera Assembly constituency =

Legislative Assembly constituency in Gujarat State, India

Coordinates: 24.51°N 72.03°E

Dhanera
- Constituency No. 9 for the Gujarat Legislative Assembly

Constituency details
- Country: India
- Region: Western India
- State: Gujarat
- District: Banaskatha
- Lok Sabha constituency: Banaskantha
- Established: 1962
- Total electors: 2,68,653
- Reservation: None

Member of Legislative Assembly
- 15th Gujarat Legislative Assembly
- Incumbent Mavjibhai Maganbhai Desai
- Party: independent
- Elected year: 2022

Dhanera is one of the 182 Legislative Assembly constituencies of Gujarat state in India. It is part of Banaskatha district. It is numbered as 9-Dhanera.

== List of segments ==
This assembly seat represents the following segments,

1. Dhanera Taluka
2. Palanpur Taluka (Part) Village – Jorapura Bhakhar
3. Dantiwada Taluka

== Members of Legislative Assembly ==
Year	Member	Image	Party
2022	Mavjibhai Maganbhai Desai		Independent
2017	Nathabhai Hegolabhai Patel		Indian National Congress
2012	Joitabhai Patel		Indian National Congress
2007	Purohit Mafatlal motiram		Bharatiya Janata Party

== Election candidate ==
=== 2022 ===
Gujarat Assembly election, 2022:Dhanera Assembly constituency
Party	Candidate	Votes	%	±%
Independent	Mavjibhai Maganbhai Desai	96,053	46.96	+46.96
BJP	Bhagvanbhai Hajabhai Patel	60,357	29.51	−17.07
INC	Nathabhai Hegolabhai Patel	38,260	18.70	−29.09
AAP	Suresh Devda	1,130	0.55	
BSP	Prakashbhai Revabhai Solanki	2,154	1.05	
NOTA	None of the above	3,811	1.86	
Majority		35,696	17.45	
Turnout		2,04,561	76.14	
Registered electors		2,68,653		

== Election results ==
=== 2017 ===
Gujarat Legislative Assembly Election, 2017: Dhanera
Party	Candidate	Votes	%	±%
INC	Nathabhai Patel	82,390	47.79	−7.51
BJP	Mavjibhai Desai	80,456	46.58	+10.56
AINHCP	Tejabhai Rabari	2,802	1.62	New
Majority		2,093	1.21	
Turnout		1,73,494	75.76	
INC gain from BJP		Swing		

=== 2012 ===
Gujarat Assembly Election, 2012
Party	Candidate	Votes	%	±%
INC	Joitabhai Patel	87,460	55.12	
BJP	Vasantbhai Purohit	57,169	36.03	
Independent	Rupabhai Dabhi	4,901	3.09	
Majority		30,291	19.09	
Turnout		1,58,664	76.84	
INC gain from BJP		Swing		

=== 2007 ===
Gujarat Assembly Election, 2007
Party	Candidate	Votes	%	±%
BJP	Mafatlal Purohit	65463	48.19	
INC	Nathabhai Pantrod	51699	38.06	
Independent	Chelabhai Sanodariya	7490	5.51	
Majority		13764	10.13	
Turnout		135847	62.78	
BJP gain from INC		Swing		

=== 2002 ===
Gujarat Assembly Election, 2002
Party	Candidate	Votes	%	±%
BJP	Harjivanbhai Patel	60573	46.79	
INC	Joitabhai Patel	57530	44.44	
Majority		3043	2.35	
Turnout		129463	68.01	
BJP gain from INC		Swing		

=== 1998 ===
Gujarat Assembly Election, 1998
Party	Candidate	Votes	%	±%
BJP	Harjivanbhai Patel	55883	52.02	
INC	Nathabhai Patel	42504	39.56	
Majority		13379	12.45	
Turnout		112842	72.05	
BJP gain from INC		Swing		

=== 1995 ===
Gujarat Assembly Election, 1995
Party	Candidate	Votes	%	±%
INC	Govabhai Rabari	63814	52.86	
BJP	Harjivanbhai Patel	52352	43.37	
Majority		11462	9.50	
Turnout		124439	79.98	
INC gain from BJP		Swing		

=== 1990 ===
Gujarat Assembly Election, 1990
Party	Candidate	Votes	%	±%
BJP	Harjivanbhai Patel	42252	49.32	
INC	Govabhai Desai	40049	46.75	
Majority		2203	2.57	
Turnout		87405	68.73	
BJP gain from INC		Swing		

=== 1985 ===
Gujarat Assembly Election, 1985
Party	Candidate	Votes	%	±%
INC	Joitabhai Patel	31,166	55.18	
BJP	Rameshchandra Shah	16975	30.05	
Majority		14191	25.13	
Turnout		57764	59.09	
INC gain from BJP		Swing		

=== 1980 ===
Gujarat Assembly Election, 1980
Party	Candidate	Votes	%	±%
JP	Joitabhai Patel	24,067	54.44	
INC	Mansukhlal Dave	18,245	41.27	
Majority		5,822	13.17	
Turnout		45,885	55.03	
JP gain from INC		Swing		

=== 1975 ===
Gujarat Assembly Election, 1975
Party	Candidate	Votes	%	±%
INC	Mansukhlal Dave	13,971	41.27	
ABJS	Vishabhai Akolia	12,170	35.95	
Majority		1,801	5.32	
Turnout		36,340	50.89	
indian National Congress gain from ABJS		Swing		

=== 1972 ===
Gujarat Assembly Election, 1972
Party	Candidate	Votes	%	±%
INC	Dalubhai Desai	18,523	55.32	
INC(O)	S Godadbhai Parikh	8,872	26.50	
Majority		9,651	28.82	
Turnout		36,228	51.40	
INC gain from INC(O)		Swing		

=== 1967 ===
Gujarat Assembly Election, 1967
Party	Candidate	Votes	%	±%
SWA	B. J. Joshi	15,146	58.35	
INC	S. M. Shah	10,813	41.65	
Majority		4,333	16.69	
Turnout		27,902	47.53	
SWA gain from INC		Swing		

=== 1962 ===
Gujarat Assembly Election, 1962
Party	Candidate	Votes	%	±%
INC	Surajmal Shah	10,665	50.60	
SWA	Balashanker Joshi	10,413	49.40	
Majority		252	1.20	
Turnout		23,123	41.75	
INC gain from SWA		Swing		

== See also ==
- List of constituencies of the Gujarat Legislative Assembly
- Banaskantha district
