= Goshala =

Protective shelters for stray cows in India

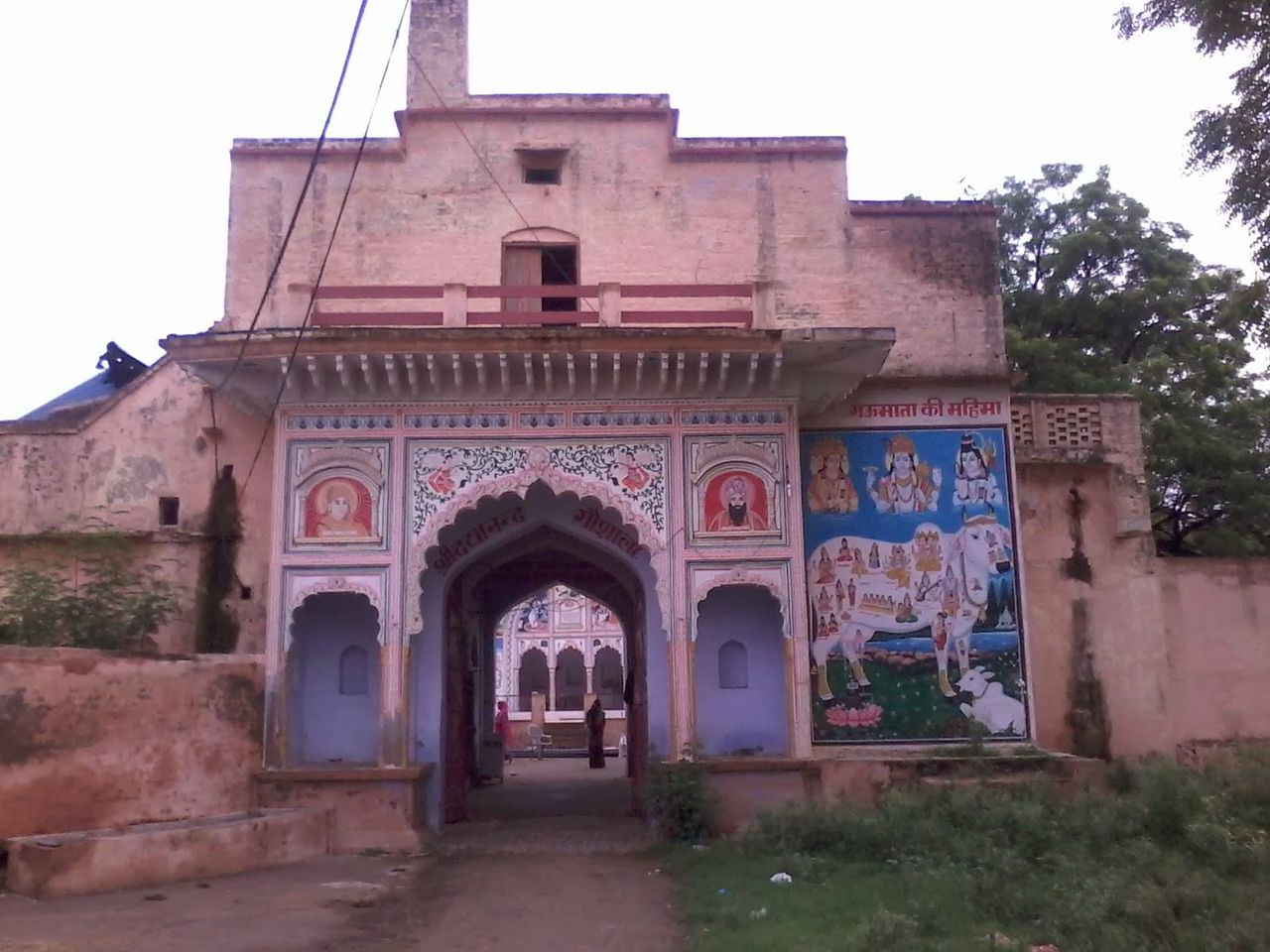
World's First Gaushala, Rewari

Gaushalas or Goshalas (Hindi: गौशाला, romanized: gauśālā) are protective shelters for stray cows in India. Government grants and donations are the primary source of income of the cow shelters in India. Since 2014, when BJP government came into power in India, India has spent ₹5.8 billion (US$60 million) on cow shelters in two years between 2014 and 2016.

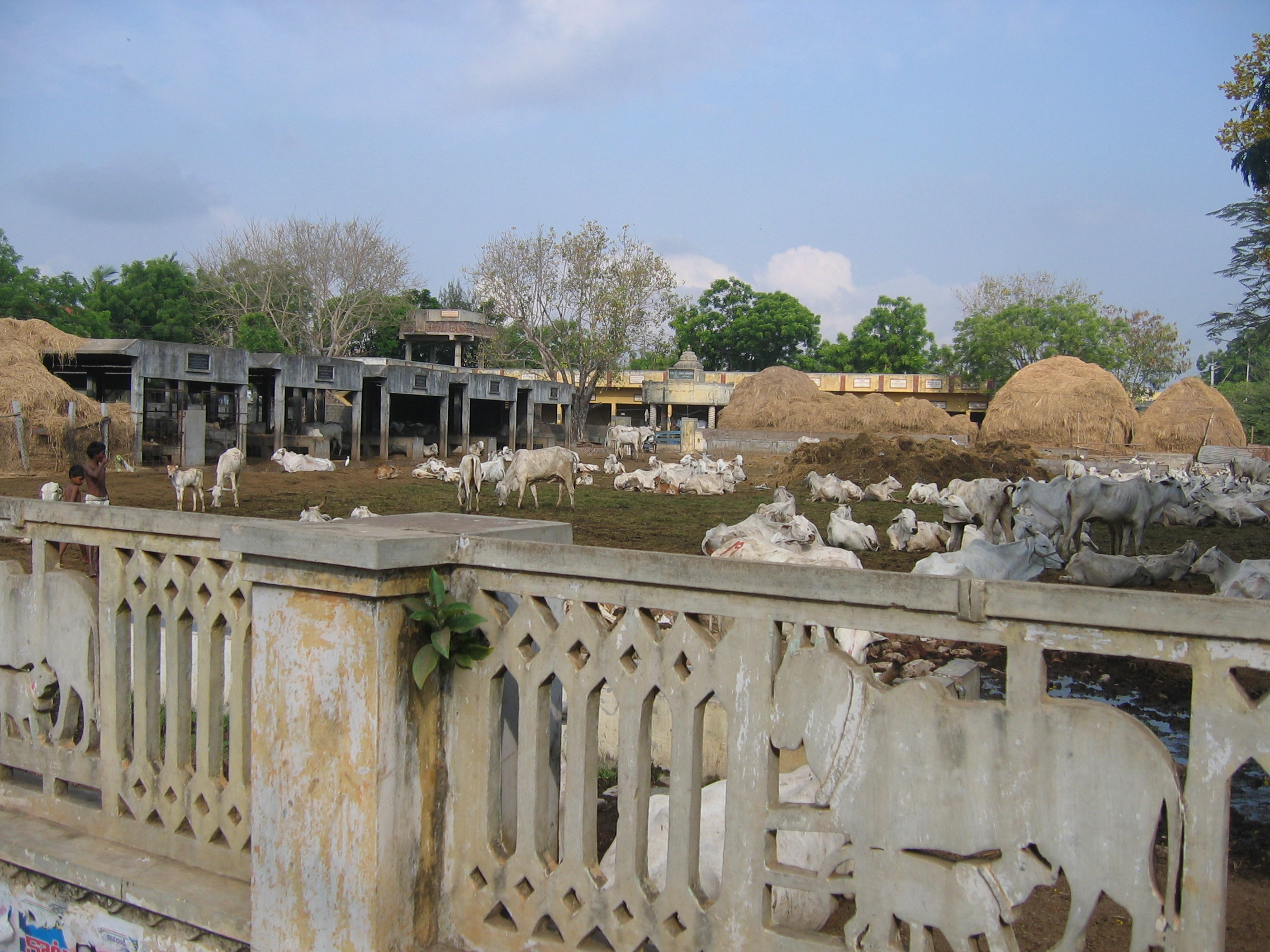
A goshala at Guntur, Andhra Pradesh.

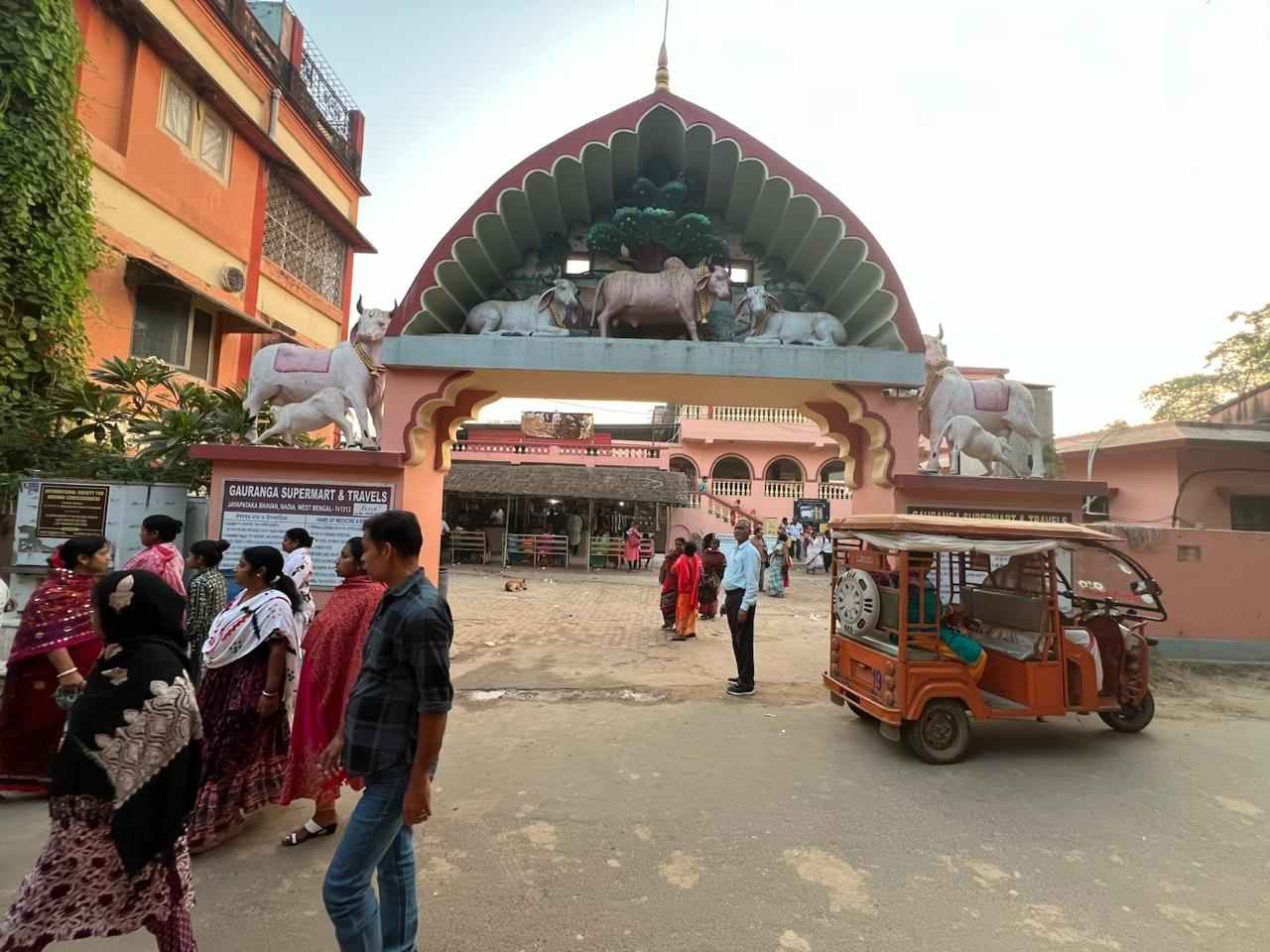
A Goshala at Mayapur ISKCON Temple compound, West Bengal

== Description ==
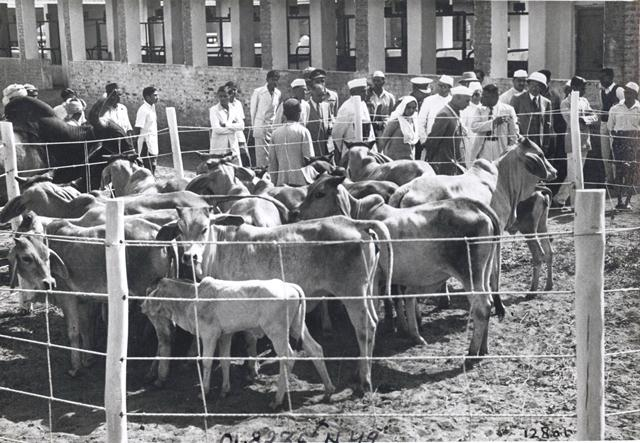
Prime Minister Jawaharlal Nehru visiting a Goshala during his Gujarat tour in 1949

Goshala, a Sanskrit word ("Go" means cow and "Shala" means a shelter place: Go + Shala = shelter for cows), means the abode or sanctuary for cows, calves and oxen.

== History ==
The first Gaurakshini sabha (cow protection society) was established in Punjab in 1882. The movement spread rapidly all over North India and to Bengal, Bombay, Madras presidencies and other central provinces. The organization rescued wandering cows and reclaimed them to groom them in places called gaushalas. Charitable networks developed all through North India to collect rice from individuals, pool the contributions, and re-sell them to fund the gaushalas. Signatures, up to 350,000 in some places, were collected to demand a ban on cow sacrifice. Between 1880 and 1893, hundreds of gaushalas were opened. Pathmeda godham is the largest Gaushala in India with over 85000 cows being sheltered in the small town of Pathmeda in southern Rajasthan.

== Government grants ==
Since the BJP government came into power in India in 2014, India has spent ₹5.8 billion (US$60 million) on cow shelters in between the years 2014 and 2016.

To prevent unproductive cows being sent to the abattoir, the government started the Rashtriya Gokul Mission in mid-2014, a national program that involves constructing havens for retired cows. Proceeds from the animals' bodily waste are intended to pay for their upkeep. In May 2016, the Indian national government held an inaugural national conference on goshalas. The Niti Ayog is working on developing a roadmap for Gaushala economy to develop commercial use of cow urine and cow dung for various purposes.

== Other sources of income ==
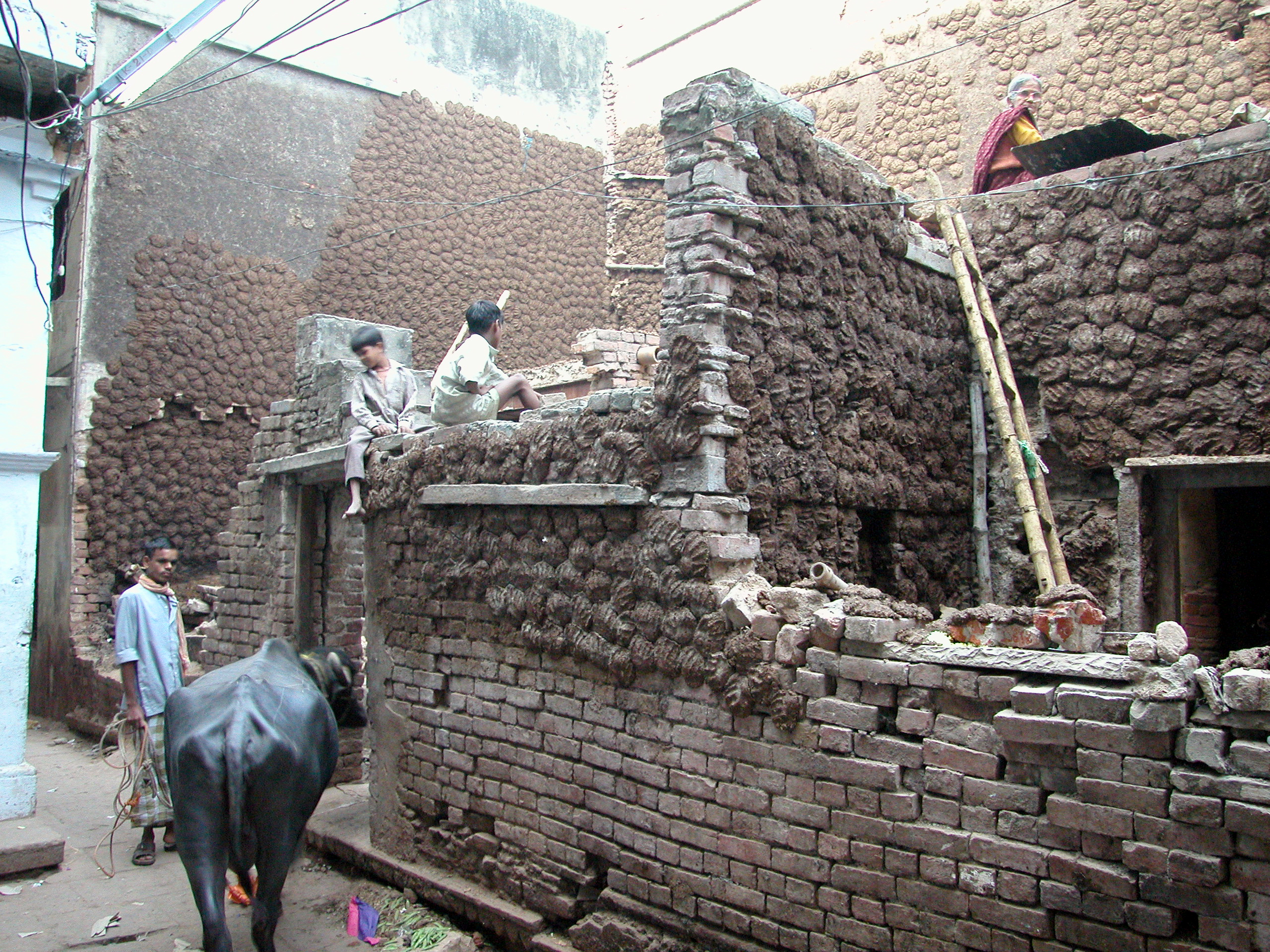
Cow dung cakes plastered over the wall for drying in Varanasi.

Donations are the only source of income for the Goshala. Some goshalas offer yoga and music lessons for additional income.

== See also ==
- Rajpur Deesa Panjarapole
- Cow protection movement, India
- Cattle slaughter in India
- Cattle in religion
- Hinduism
- Cow house
