= Mavji Desai =

Member of Legislative Assembly from Dhanera

- માવજી દેસાઈ
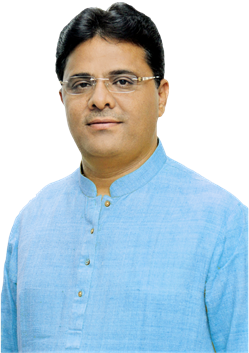

Member of Gujarat Legislative Assembly
- Incumbent
- Assumed office 8 December 2022
- Preceded by: Nathabhai Patel
- Constituency: Dhanera, Banaskantha

Chairman, APMC Deesa
- Incumbent
- Assumed office 19 September 2013
- Preceded by: Govabhai Desai

Vice Chairman, Banas Dairy
- In office 27 December 2015 – 8 October 2021
- Preceded by: Jorabhai Desai
- Succeeded by: Bhavaji Rabari

Personal details
- Born: Mavjibhai Maganbhai Desai; 3 October 1972 (age 53) Baiwada, Gujarat, India
- Citizenship: Indian
- Party: Independent
- Children: Two Son; One Daughter
- Parent(s): Maganbhai Desai (father); Rukhiben Desai (mother)
- Website: www.mavjidesai.com

Mavji Desai is a Member of Gujarat Legislative Assembly from Dhanera- Banaskantha, Chairman of APMC Deesa, Former Vice-Chairman of Banas Dairy, and the member of Bhartiya Janta Party.

== Early life ==
He was born on 3 October 1971 in Baiwada, Gujarat in a farmer family of Maganbhai Desai and Rukhiben Desai.

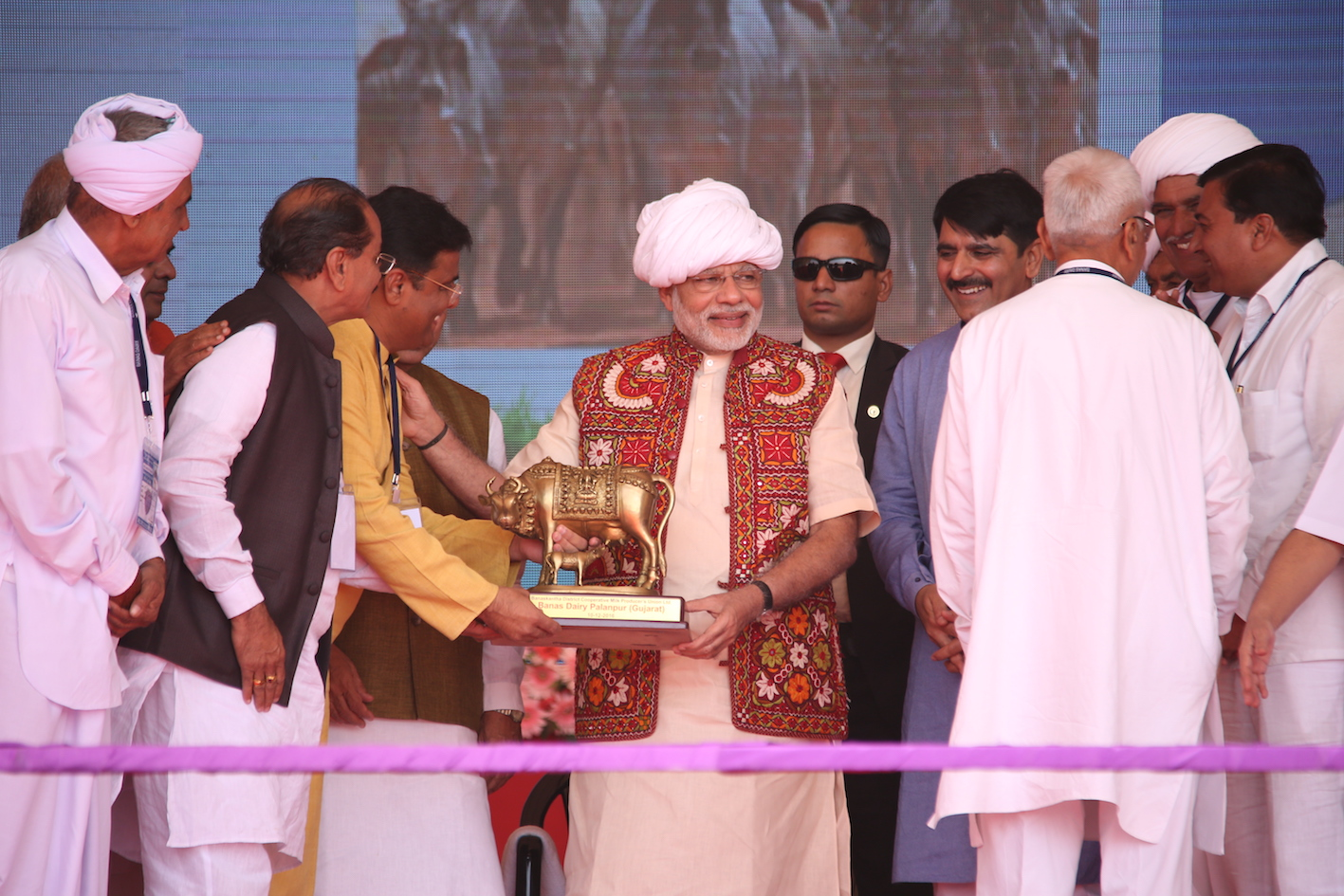
Mavjibhai with Shri Narendra Modi at Deesa

== Political career ==
He contested his first ever election of the Sarpanch in 2001 from Baiwada. Then he was elected as Director of APMC Deesa for three terms. At present, he is Chairman of Agriculture Producing Marketing Committee of Deesa, Vice chairman of Banaskantha District Cooperative Milk Federation, Palanpur (Banas Dairy).

On 24 November 2017 The BJP Central Election Committee nominated Mavji Desai (Rabari) as MLA candidate from Dhanera, Banaskantha.

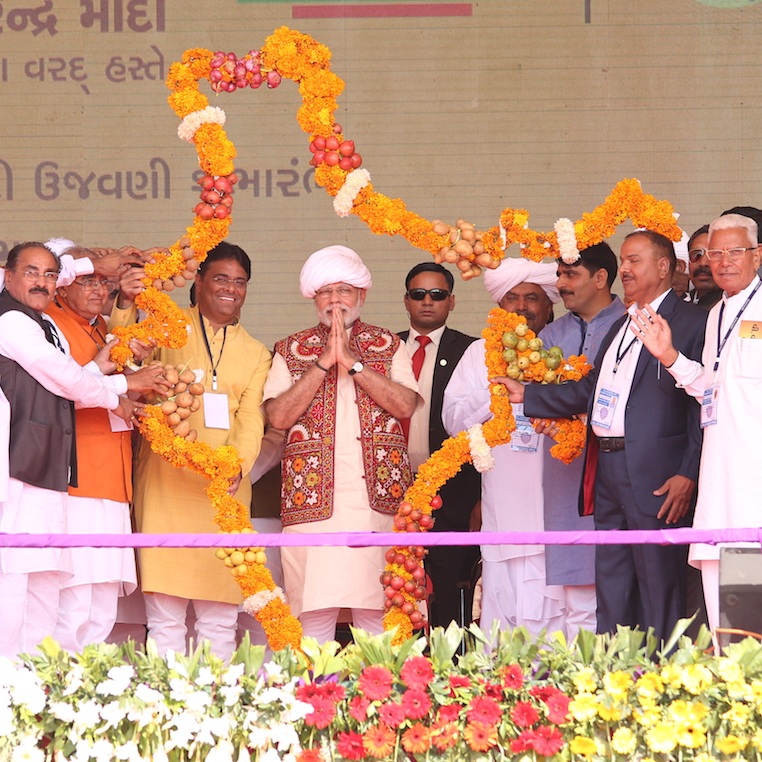
Mavjibhai desai with Prime Minister Narendra Modi at Deesa
