= Baiwada =

- Village
- Location within Gujarat Location within India
- Coordinates: 24°21′18.5″N 72°10′05.2″E
- Country: India
- State: Gujarat
- District: Banaskantha

Government
  - Type: Panchayati Raj
  - Body: Gram Panchayat

Population (2011)
  - Total: 4,835

Languages
  - Official: Hindi, Gujarati
- Time zone: UTC+5:30 (IST)
- PIN: 385535
- Area code: 02744
- Vehicle registration: GJ 08
- Website: gujaratindia.com

Baiwada is a village located in Banaskantha district in the state of Gujarat, India.The village is located at about 10 km from the Deesa. The village follows the Panchayati raj system. The sarpanch of Baiwada. The village has undergone a transformation under the panchayat.

== Demographics ==
The Baiwada village has population of 4835 of which 2468 are males while 2367 are females as per Population Census 2011.

In Baiwada village population of children with age 0-6 is 794 which makes up 16.42% of total population of village. Average Sex Ratio of Baiwada village is 959 which is higher than Gujarat state average of 919. Child Sex Ratio for the Baiwada as per census is 864, lower than Gujarat average of 890.

== Education system ==
There is one primary school in Baiwada. The school drop-out rate is zero in Baiwada.

== Water system ==
The panchayat arranging Drinking water for all villagers. The village also has a proper sanitation and drainage system.
