= Mandvi Assembly constituency =

Mandvi Assembly constituency may refer to:

- Mandvi, Kachchh Assembly constituency in Gujarat
- Mandvi, Surat Assembly constituency in Gujarat
