= Rajpur Deesa Panjarapole =

Indian animal rights charity

- Formation: 1992
- Founder: Bharatbhai Kothari & Nanubhai Shah
- Type: Non-profit organization
- Purpose: Animal welfare, conservation
- Headquarters: Rajpur, Banaskantha district, Gujarat, India
- Website: rdpdeesa.org

Rajpur Deesa Panjarapole is a non-profit organization founded in 1992 in Rajpur, Banaskantha district, Gujarat, India. The organization's primary objective is to rescue and rehabilitate animals, particularly those destined for slaughter.

== History ==
Rajpur Deesa Panjarapole was established in 1992 with the rescue of two goats. Since its inception, the organization has saved over 125,000 animal lives, primarily from slaughterhouses. Volunteers have risked their lives and faced numerous attacks to protect these animals.

== Operations ==
The organization operates on donations and has no fixed income source. It provides shelter and care to more than 9,000 animals. The organization employs over 100 cattle herders and five animal welfare experts.

== Notable Rescues ==
- 1994: 10 trucks of goats and sheep rescued from Deesa Rural
- 1995: 5 trucks of goats and sheep rescued from Deesa Rural
- 1996: 5 trucks of goats and sheep rescued from Palanpur Rural
- 1997: 31 trucks of cattle rescued from Sanchore, Rajasthan
- 1998: 1,510 cattle rescued from a Jodhpur to Anand train
- 2008: 8 trucks with over 2,200 goats and sheep rescued from Deesa
- 2016: Horses rescued from West Bengal
- 2017: Camels rescued from Hyderabad
- 2018: Stopped export of millions of sheep and goats to Arab countries from Gujarat's Tuna port
- 2019-20: In the year 2019–20, during the difficult period of COVID-19, after the agitation work against the government, 425,000 animals of Gujarat got help.
- 2021: Rescued 3,200 animals despite the demise of founder Bharatbhai Kothari

== Legal Interventions ==
Rajpur Deesa Panjarapole has appealed to local courts, the High Court, and the Supreme Court to protect animal rights.
