= Anand Chaudhari =

Indian politician

Anand Chaudhari (born 17 October 1971) is an Indian politician from Gujarat. He is a member of the Gujarat Legislative Assembly from Mandvi Assembly constituency, which is reserved for Scheduled Tribe community, in Surat district. He won the 2017 Gujarat Legislative Assembly election representing the Indian National Congress.

== Early life and education ==
Chaudhari is from Mandvi, Surat district, Gujarat. He is the son of Mohanbhai Chaudhari. He passed Class 12 and later did a diploma in mechanical engineering at Dr. S & S, Gandhi Engineering College, Surat. He married Pritiben Chaudhari.

== Career ==
Chaudhari won from Mandvi Assembly constituency representing the Indian National Congress in the 2017 Gujarat Legislative Assembly election. He polled 96,483 votes and defeated his nearest rival, Merjibhai Chaudhari of the Bharatiya Janata Party, by a margin of 50,776 votes. He became an MLA for the first time winning the by-election conducted in 2014 defeating Hemlataben Vasava of the Bharatiya Janata Party by a margin of 22,569 votes.
