= Kirtisinh Vaghela =

Indian politician

Former Minister of state Government of Gujarat
- In office 16 September 2021 - 2022
- Ministry: Term
- Former Minister of Primary, Secondary & Adult Education: 16 September 2021 - 2022

Member of Gujarat Legislative Assembly
- In office 2017 – 2022
- Preceded by: Dharshibhai Khanpura
- Succeeded by: Amrutji Motiji Thakor
- Constituency: Kankrej

Personal details
- Party: Bhartiya Janata Party
- Occupation: Politician, farmer, businessman
- Website: www.kirtisinhvaghela.com

Kirtisinh Vaghela is an Indian politician. He is State Education Minister. He is a Member of Legislative Assembly from Kankrej constituency in Gujarat legislative assembly, elected in 2017. He is associated with the Bharatiya Janata Party.

== Political history ==
Post	Party	Location	Duration
President	Booth Committee, BJP	Kharia, kankrej	2003 to 2005
President	Yuva Morcha BJP	Kankrej, Banaskantha	2005 to 2006
General secretary	BJP	Kankrej, Banaskantha	2006 to 2009
State Secretary	BJP Kishan moracho	Gujarat	2012 to 2016
Vice President	BJP Kishan moracho	Gujarat Region	2017 till date
