= Thara, Gujarat =

Thara
- Town
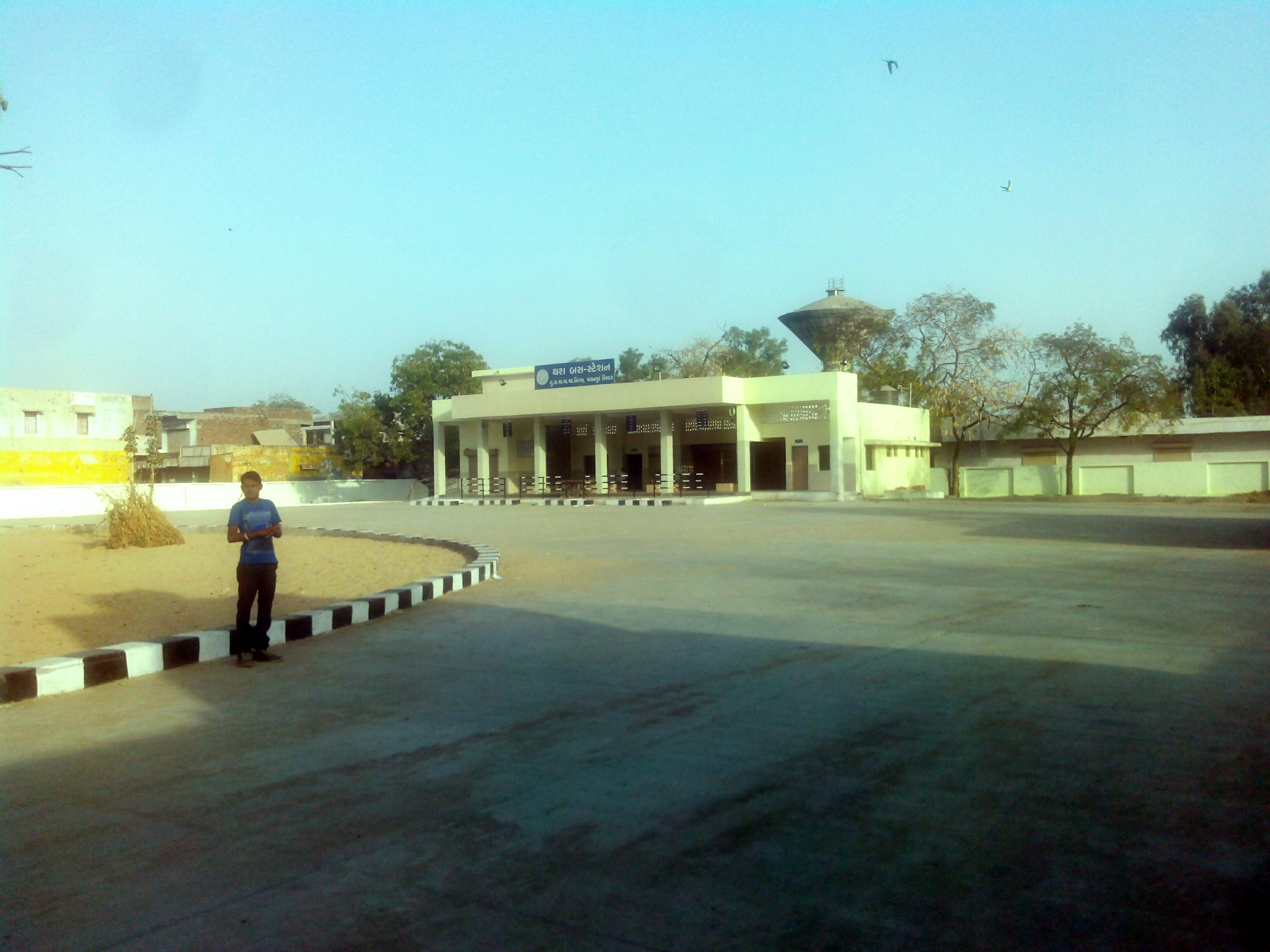
- GSRTC Bus stand in Thara

- Location in Gujarat, India Thara (India)
- Coordinates: 23.968°N 71.824°E
- Country: India
- State: Gujarat
- District: Banaskantha

Government
  - Type: Municipality

Languages
  - Official: Gujarati, Hindi
- Time zone: UTC+5:30 (IST)
- PIN: 385 555
- Telephone code: +91-02747
- Vehicle registration: GJ-8

Thara is census town and Taluka Headquarter of Ogad in Banaskantha, Gujarat, India.
