= Parbhubhai Vasava =

Indian politician

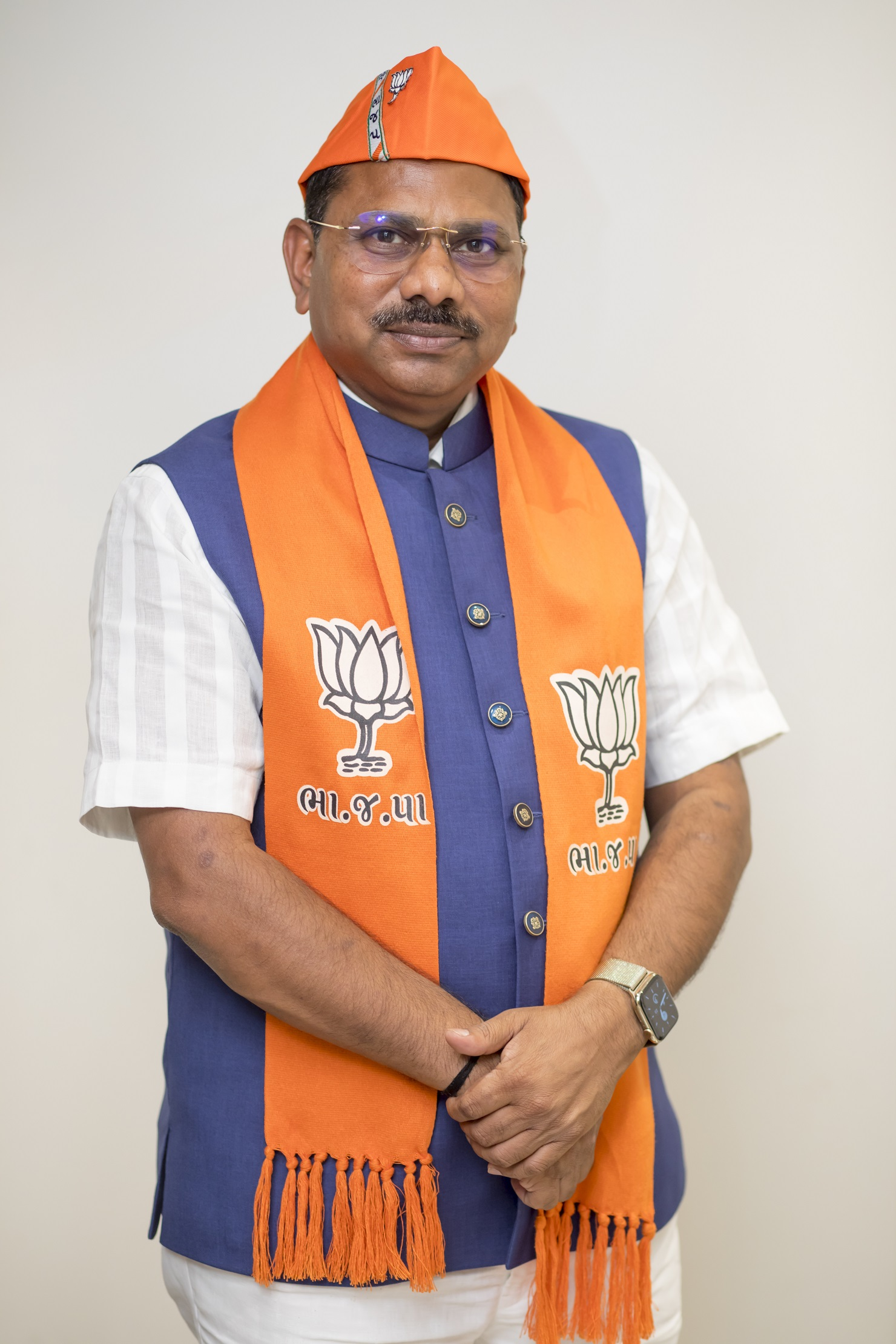
Parbhubhai Vasava Parbhubhai Vasava Picture

Member of parliament, Lok Sabha
- Incumbent
- Assumed office 16 May 2014
- Preceded by: Tushar Chaudhary
- Constituency: Bardoli

Personal details
- Born: 1 March 1970 (age 56) Kolkhadi, Mandvi, Surat, Gujarat
- Party: Bharatiya Janata Party
- Spouse: Smt. Pannaben P. Vasava
- Children: 2
- Occupation: Agriculturist
- As of 15 December, 2016

Parbhubhai Nagarbhai Vasava ( Prabhu) (born 1 March 1970) is an Indian politician from Gujarat. He is a three time member of Lok Sabha from Bardoli Lok Sabha constituency representing the Bharatiya Janata Party.

== Early life and education ==
Vasava is from Bardoli, Gujarat. He is the son of Nagarbhai Diveliyabhai Vasava. He did a diploma in mechanical engineering in 1993 at Gandhi Engineering College, Surat and passed the examinations conducted by the Technical Examination Board, Gandhinagar. His wife is a teacher.

== Career ==
Vasava first became an MLA from Mandvi Assembly constituency, which is reserved for Scheduled Tribe community, in Surat district, winning the 2012 Gujarat Legislative Assembly election representing the Indian National Congress. He later joined the Bharatiya Janata Party in 2014. He won from Bardoli Lok Sabha constituency in 2014 Indian general election in Gujarat and retained the seat in the 2019 Indian general election, both as a BJP candidate. He won for the third time winning the 2024 Indian general election in Gujarat. In the 2024 Lok Sabha election, he secured 763,950 votes and defeated Chaudhary Siddharth Amarsingh of the Indian National Congress.
