= Parthi Bhatol =

Indian dairy businessman

Parthi Bhatol was the ex-chairman of the Banaskantha Milk Producers' Union in Gujarat, India. He was ex-chairman of the Gujarat Cooperative Milk Marketing Federation (GCMMF) on 26 April 2006, replacing its founding chairman, Verghese Kurien.
