= Kankrej Assembly constituency =

Legislative Assembly constituency in Gujarat State, India

Coordinates: 23.97°N 71.83°E

Kankrej
- Constituency No. 15 for the Gujarat Legislative Assembly

Constituency details
- Country: India
- Region: Western India
- State: Gujarat
- District: Banaskantha
- Lok Sabha constituency: Patan
- Established: 1967
- Total electors: 291,577
- Reservation: None

Member of Legislative Assembly
- 15th Gujarat Legislative Assembly
- Incumbent Amrutji Motiji Thakor
- Party: Indian National Congress
- Elected year: 2022

Kankrej is one of the 182 Legislative Assembly constituencies of Gujarat state in India. It is part of Banaskantha district. It is numbered as 15-Kankrej.

== List of segments ==
This assembly seat represents the following segments,

1. Kankrej Taluka
2. Deesa Taluka (Part) Villages – Lunpur, Manekpura, Khardosan, Aseda, Nava, Sadarpur, Chhatrala, Mudetha, Yavarganj, Bodal, Jhabadiya, Bhadramali, Dharisana, Kanajhara, Samau Motavas, Saviyana, Velavapura, Samau Nana as.

== Members of Legislative Assembly ==
Year	Member	Party
1967	Jayantilal Virchand Shah	Indian National Congress
1972	Shantilal Dhandhara	Indian National Congress
1975	Mafatlal Panchani	Indian National Congress
1980	Shantilal Dhandhara	Indian National Congress
1985	Jayantilal Virchand Shah	Janata Party
1990	Dharshibhai Khanpura	Janata Dal
1995	Dharshibhai Khanpura	Indian National Congress
1998	Magansinh Vaghela	Indian National Congress
2002	Dharshibhai Khanpura	Indian National Congress
2007	Babubhai Desai	Bharatiya Janata Party
2012	Dharshibhai Khanpura	Indian National Congress
2017	Kirtisinh Vaghela	Bharatiya Janata Party
2022	Amrut Thakor	Indian National Congress

== Election results ==
=== 2022 ===
Gujarat Assembly election, 2022:Kankrej Assembly constituency
Party	Candidate	Votes	%	±%
INC	Amrutji Motiji Thakor	96,624	47.81	
BJP	Vaghela Kirtisinh Prabhatsinh	91,329	45.19	
AAP	Mukeshkumar Somalal Thakkar	5,061	2.5	
NOTA	None of the above	3,811	1.89	
Majority			2.62	
Turnout				
Registered electors		291,481		

=== 2017 ===
Gujarat Legislative Assembly Election, 2017: Kankrej
Party	Candidate	Votes	%	±%
BJP	Kirtisinh Vaghela	95,131	49.65	
INC	Dineshji Jalera	86,543	45.17	
None of the Above	None of the Above	3,881	2.03	
Majority			4.48	
Turnout		1,91,587	75.97	
BJP gain from INC		Swing		

=== 2012 ===
Gujarat Assembly Election, 2012
Party	Candidate	Votes	%	±%
INC	Dharshibhai Khanpura	73,900	45.13	
BJP	Kirtisinh Vaghela	73,300	44.76	
Majority		600	0.37	
Turnout		163,751	71.74	
INC gain from BJP		Swing		

== See also ==
- List of constituencies of the Gujarat Legislative Assembly
- Banaskantha district
