= Sanval, India =

Sanval
- Village
- Location within Gujarat Location within India
- Coordinates: 24°36′16″N 71°29′01″E
- Country: India
- State: Gujarat
- District: Banaskantha

Government
  - Type: Panchayati Raj
  - Body: Gram Panchayat

Population (2011)
  - Total: 2,600

Languages
  - Official: Hindi, Gujarati
- Time zone: UTC+5:30 (IST)
- PIN: 385566
- Area code: 02744
- Vehicle registration: GJ 08
- Website: gujaratindia.com

Sanval, is a village in Gujarat in western India. It is located in Vav Taluka, in Banaskantha district and has a population of 2,600 (2011).

The village has one primary school. Ramji Mandir is a temple in the village.
