= V. D. Zalavadiya =

Indian politician

V. D. Zalavadiya (born 1 February 1961) is an Indian politician. He is a former member of the Gujarat Legislative Assembly from the Kamrej Assembly constituency from 2017 to 2022. He is a member of the Bharatiya Janata Party.
