= Kamrej Assembly constituency =

Legislative Assembly constituency in Gujarat State, India, Asia

Coordinates: 21.27°N 72.96°E

Kamrej
- Constituency No. 158 for the Gujarat Legislative Assembly

Constituency details
- Country: India
- Region: Western India
- State: Gujarat
- District: Surat
- Lok Sabha constituency: Bardoli
- Established: 1975
- Total electors: 547,634
- Reservation: None

Member of Legislative Assembly
- 15th Gujarat Legislative Assembly
- Incumbent Praful Pansheriya
- Party: Bharatiya Janata Party
- Elected year: 2022

Kamrej is one of the 182 Legislative Assembly constituencies of Gujarat state in India. It is part of Surat district.

== List of segments ==
This assembly seat represents the following segments,

1. Kamrej Taluka
2. Choryasi Taluka (Part) Villages – Saroli, Saniya Hemad, Simada, Sarthana, Puna, Magob.

== Members of Legislative Assembly ==
Year	Member	Picture	Party
2007	Bharatiben Rathod		Bharatiya Janata Party
2012	Praful Pansheriya		Bharatiya Janata Party
2017	V. D. Zalavadiya		Bharatiya Janata Party
2022	Praful Pansheriya		Bharatiya Janata Party

== Election results ==
=== 2022 ===
Gujarat Assembly election, 2022:Kamrej Assembly constituency
Party	Candidate	Votes	%	±%
BJP	Praful Pansheriya	1,85,585	56.07	
AAP	Ram dhaduk	1,10,888	33.5	
INC	Nileshbhai Mansukhbhai Kunbhani	27,511	8.31	
NOTA	None of the above	2,291	0.69	
Majority		74,697	22.57	
Turnout				
Registered electors		5,36,440		
BJP hold		Swing		

=== 2017 ===
Gujarat Legislative Assembly Election, 2017: Kamrej
Party	Candidate	Votes	%	±%
BJP	V. D. Zalavadiya	147,371	53.05	
INC	Ashok Jiravala	119,180	42.90	
AAP	Ram Dhaduk	1,454	0.52	
NOTA	None of the Above	3,413	1.23	
Majority		28,191	7.15	
Turnout		277,812	64.80	
Registered electors		428,700		

=== 2012 ===
Gujarat Assembly Election, 2012: Kamrej
Party	Candidate	Votes	%	±%
BJP	Praful Pansheriya	126,032	57.30	
INC	Bhagirathbhai Pithavdiwala	64,661	29.40	
Majority		61,371	27.90	
Turnout		219,970	72.21	
BJP hold		Swing		

== See also ==
- List of constituencies of Gujarat Legislative Assembly
- Gujarat Legislative Assembly
