= Babubhai Desai =

Indian politician

Babubhai Jesangbhai Desai

Member of Parliament, Rajya Sabha
- Incumbent
- Assumed office 19 August 2023
- Preceded by: Dineshchandra Anavadiya
- Constituency: Gujarat

Member of Gujarat Legislative Assembly
- In office 2007–2012
- Preceded by: Dharshibhai Khanpura
- Succeeded by: Dharshibhai Khanpura
- Constituency: Kankrej

Personal details
- Born: 1 June 1957 (age 68) Maktupur, Gujarat, India
- Party: Bhartiya Janata Party
- Spouse: Ambaben Babubhai Desai
- Children: 2 sons, 1 daughter
- Parents: Jesangbhai Desai (father); Rukhiben J Desai (mother)

Babubhai Jesangbhai Desai is an Indian politician who is currently serving as Member of Parliament in Rajya Sabha representing Gujarat. He is former MLA in Gujarat Legislative Assembly representing Kankrej. He was awarded with Best MLA Award of Gujarat (India) for its 12th legislative assembly.
