= Nathabhai Hegolabhai Patel =

Indian politician

- Born: 1 January 1947 (age 78); Dhanera, Banaskantha, India
- Occupation: Farming

Nathabhai Hegolabhai Patel (born 1 January 1947) is an Indian politician from the state of Gujarat. He is a former MLA representing Dhanera Assembly constituency from 2017 to 2022. He belongs to Indian National Congress party.
