= Maktupur =

Maktupur Muktipur
- Village, Semi-Urban
- Location in Gujarat, India Maktupur (India)
- Coordinates: 23.8270°N 72.3742°E
- Country: India
- State: Gujarat
- District: Mehsana
- Taluka: Unjha
- Elevation: 110 m (360 ft)

Population (2024)
  - Total: 6,548
  - ethnicity: 90.0% Indian; 10.00% NRI

Languages
  - Official: Gujarati, Hindi, English
- Time zone: UTC+5:30 (IST)
- Postal code: 384170
- Vehicle registration: GJ
- Website: gujaratindia.com

Maktupur is a small village in North Gujarat, West India. It is in Mehsana district. Maktupur is between the three cities of Patan (26 km west), Visanagar (28 km south-east), and Mahesana (25 km south).

== Geography ==
Maktupur is located at 23.8270°N 72.3742°E. It has an average elevation of 110 metres (364 feet).
