= Mandvi, Surat Assembly constituency =

Legislative Assembly constituency in Gujarat State, India

Coordinates: 21.26°N 73.3°E

Mandvi
- Constituency No. 157 for the Gujarat Legislative Assembly

Constituency details
- Country: India
- Region: Western India
- State: Gujarat
- District: Surat
- Lok Sabha constituency: Bardoli
- Established: 1962
- Total electors: 246,979
- Reservation: ST

Member of Legislative Assembly
- 15th Gujarat Legislative Assembly
- Incumbent Kunvarjibhai Narsinhbhai Halpati
- Party: Bharatiya Janata Party
- Elected year: 2022

Mandvi is one of the 182 Legislative Assembly constituencies of Gujarat state in India. It is part of Surat district and is reserved for candidates belonging to the Scheduled Tribes. It is a segment of Bardoli Lok Sabha constituency.

== List of segments ==
This assembly seat represents the following segments,

1. Mandvi Taluka
2. Songadh Taluka (Part) Villages – Sadadkuva, Samarkuva, Amaldi, Singalvan, Ajvar, Otatokarva, Borda, Jhari Amba, Gundi, Vajpur, Satkashi, Kuilivel, Amalpada, Bavli, Serulla, Limbi, Sar Jamli, Nindvada, Bhatvada, Khervada, Junai, Ghasiya Medha, Sisor, Panch Pipla, Bhanpur, Jamapur, Vekur, Bori Savar, Vadda P Bhensrot, Singal Khanch, Bundha, Silatvel, Patharda, Vadi Bhensrot, Singpur, Vaghnera, Dhajamba, Veljhar, Chikhli Bhensrot, Vajharda, Bedvan P Bhensrot, Ukhalda, Jhadpati, Galkhadi, Pipalkuva, Moti Khervan, Nani Khervan, Ghoda, Bhurivel, Bhimpura, Vagda, Gunsada, Dumda, Amlipada, Kelai, Kavla, Amli, Bedi, Agasvan, Nishana, Achhalva, Bedvan Khadka, Kikakui, Mandal, Chakalia, Ukai (CT).

== Members of Vidhan Sabha ==
- 1962 - Ramjibhai Rajibhai Chaudhari (INC)
- 1967 - P. D. Patel (INC)
- 1972 - Vinodbhai M Chaudhari (INC)

1975-2007 ASSEMBLY SEAT KNOWN AS SONGADH

Election	Name	Party
2012	Parbhubhai Vasava	Indian National Congress
2014*	Anand Chaudhari	Indian National Congress
2017	Anand Chaudhari	Indian National Congress
2022	Kunvarji Narsinhbhai Halpati	Bharatiya Janata Party

*By election

== Election results ==
=== 2022 ===
Gujarat Assembly election, 2022:Mandvi, Surat Assembly constituency
Party	Candidate	Votes	%	±%
BJP	Kunvarji Halpati	74502	39.29	
INC	Anand Chaudhari	56393	29.74	
AAP	Saynaben Rustambhai Gamit	49108	25.9	
BSP	Ashokbhai Chhotubhai Chaudhary	2292	1.29	
NOTA	None of the above	2902	1.53	
Majority			9.55	
Turnout				
Registered electors		243,846		
BJP gain from INC		Swing		

=== 2017 ===
Gujarat Legislative Assembly Election, 2017: Mandvi (Surat)
Party	Candidate	Votes	%	±%
INC	Anand Chaudhari	96,483	53.10	+0.93
BJP	Merjibhai Chaudhari	45,707	25.16	−13.54
IND	Kunvarji Halpati	29,552	16.26	New
Majority		50,776	27.94	+14.47
Turnout		1,81,695	80.39	−0.19
INC hold		Swing		

=== 2014 by-poll ===
By-election, 2014: Mandvi
Party	Candidate	Votes	%	±%
INC	Anand Chaudhari	91,242	52.17	+2.45
BJP	Hemlataben Vasava	68,673	38.70	+3.54
Majority		22,569	+13.47	−1.09
Turnout		174,888	80.58	+0.55
INC hold		Swing		

=== 2012 ===
Gujarat Assembly Election, 2012
Party	Candidate	Votes	%	±%
INC	Prabhubhai Vasava	83,298	49.72	
BJP	Hemlataben Vasava	58,904	35.16	
Majority		24394	14.56	
Turnout		167536	80.03	
INC win (new seat)				

== See also ==
- Gujarat Legislative Assembly
- List of constituencies of Gujarat Legislative Assembly
