= Shihori =

- Gender: Female

Origin
- Origin: Japanese
- Meaning: Different meanings depending on the kanji used

Shihori (written: 栞 or しほり in hiragana) is a feminine Japanese given name. Notable people with the name include:

- Shihori Kanjiya (貫地谷 しほり; born 1985), Japanese actress
- Shihori Oikawa (及川 栞; born 1989), Japanese field hockey player
