= Mafatlal Purohit =

Indian politician

MLA of Gujarat
- In office 2007–2012
- Constituency: Dhanera

Personal details
- Party: Bhartiya Janata Party

Mafatlal Purohit is a Member of Legislative assembly from Dhanera constituency in Gujarat for its 12th legislative assembly.
