= Deesa Airport =

Airport in Gujarat, India

- IATA: none; ICAO: VADS

Summary
- Airport type: Public
- Operator: Airports Authority of India
- Serves: Deesa
- Location: Deesa, India
- Elevation AMSL: 485 ft (148 m)
- Coordinates: 24°16′04.57″N 072°12′15.96″E

Maps
- Location of the airport in Gujarat Deesa Airport (India)
- Interactive map of Deesa Airport

Runways
| Direction | Length | | Surface |
| Direction | ft | m | Surface |
|---|---|---|---|
| 06/024 | 3,300 | 1,006 | Asphalt |

Deesa Airport (also spelled Disa Airport) is an airport in Deesa, Gujarat. It is managed by the Airports Authority of India.

== Overview ==
The airport hit national headlines in February 2011 when Subramanian Swamy claimed that 2G case accused Shahid Balwa illegally used the airport to secretly transport VIPs and criminals in and out of the country. The Airports Authority of India denied this was the case, stating that the airstrip was not used for the last two years, due to the poor condition of the airstrip, adding that it was fit only for paragliding. The airfield was most recently used for a sky diving program in 2013.

In September 2011, A K Gogoi, Commander in Chief, South Western Air Command of the Indian Air Force announced that there was a proposal to develop Deesa Airport into a full-fledged Air Base and that the Defence Ministry had approved this proposal. Deesa was chosen due to its strategic location, being close to the international border with Pakistan. The first phase of this proposal includes spending ₹3,000 crore (US$310 million) on strengthening airport infrastructure.

In March 2018, the Cabinet Committee on Security headed by the Prime Minister of India approved the forward air force base plan.

In October 2020, the Government sanction was given for the infrastructure activities of the approved Air Force Base, in November 2020, they were inaugurated by the Indian Air Force's Chief Marshal, RKS Bhadauria.

On 30 September 2022, the groundbreaking ceremony for runway and allied infrastructure at the Deesa Air Force station was held by Prime Minister Narendra Modi. The project will cost ₹1,000 crore (US$100 million). The air base is spread over an area of 4,000 acres (1,600 ha). The new runway was constructed at cost of ₹394 crore (US$41 million) and was inaugurated on 21 February 2024 by PM Modi.
