= Ambaji =

Shakta pitha in Gujarat

Ambaji Arasur, Amba Bhavani
- Census Town
- Location in Gujarat, India Ambaji (India)
- Coordinates: 24.33°N 72.85°E
- Country: India
- State: Gujarat
- District: Banaskantha

Population (2011)
  - Total: 17,753

Languages
  - Official: Gujarati, Hindi
- Time zone: UTC+5:30 (IST)
- PIN code: 385110
- Telephone code: 91-02749
- Vehicle registration: GJ-8
- Website: Ambaji Gujarat

Ambaji (Ambājī) is a census town in Banaskantha district in the state of Gujarat, India.

== Geography ==
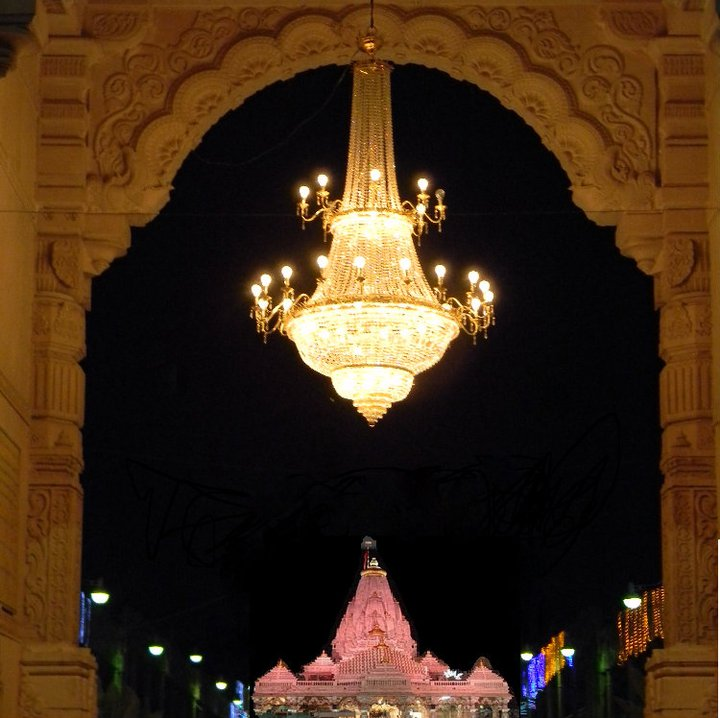
Ambaji Temple at Night

Ambaji is a town within taluka district Banaskantha, North Gujarat, India. It is located at 24.33°N 72.85°E. It is at an altitude of 480 metres (1,570 ft). It is surrounded by the Araveli Hill range. Ambaji is within the Aravali Range'line of peaks', is a range of mountains in western India running approximately 800 km in a northeastern direction across Indian states of Gujarat, Rajasthan, Haryana and Delhi. It is also called Mewat hills locally. Ambaji town also in between the borders of North Gujarat and Abu Road of Rajasthan.

== Demographics ==
As of 2011 India census, Ambaji had a population of 17,753. Males constitute 9,132 of the population and females 8,621. Ambaji has an average literacy rate of 78.39%, higher than the state average of 78.03%, with 85.76% of the males and 70.78% of females literate; 14.12% of the population is under 6 years of age.

== Climate ==
Summers are typically hot and humid with hot winds and temperatures between 26 and 46 degrees Celsius. In winter the temperature ranges between 6 and 36 degrees Celsius and rainfall is about 15 to 30 inches; in the monsoon season, average rainfall is about the same as in winter. Ambaji is at an altitude of 480 m.

== Ambaji Mata Temple ==
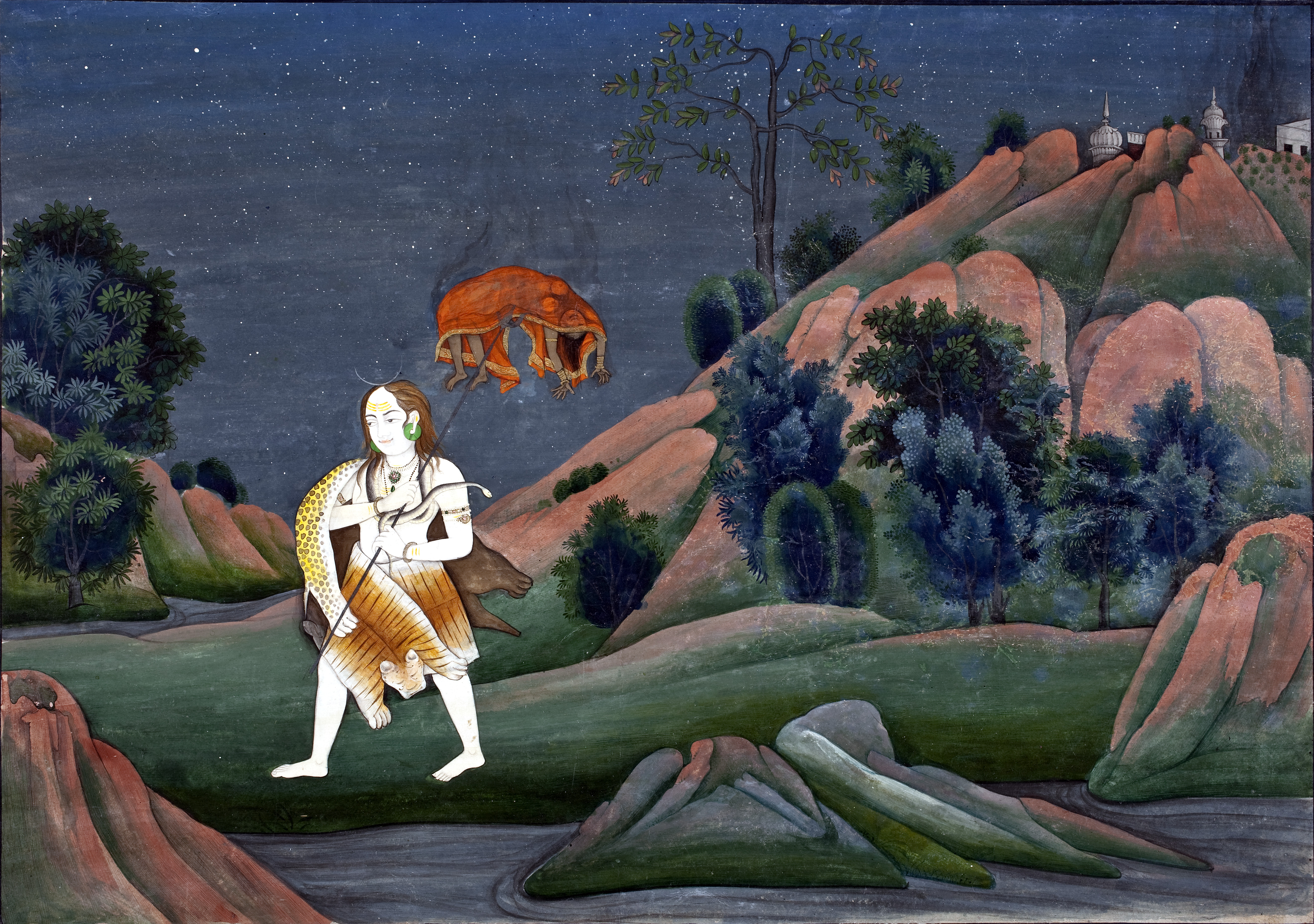
Shiva carrying the corpse Sati (goddess)

Ambaji Mata Temple is a pilgrimage site visited by millions of devotees during the week of the Bhadarvi Poonam fair. It is one of the 51 Shakta pithas. It is situated at a distance of approximately 65 kilometres from Palanpur, 45 kilometres from Mount Abu, 120 kilometres from Bhinmal sub-district and 20 kilometres from Abu Road, and 185 kilometres from Ahmedabad, 50 kilometers from Kadiyadra which is near the Gujarat and Rajasthan border.

The temple of Aṁbājī is of no special archeological interest. In the garbhagr̥ha there is a crevice in the wall of the mother goddess. There is no idol, but clothing, accessories, and facial masks are arranged periodically such that different darśanas can be seen, e.g. the mother goddess riding on a tiger. Nearby are two eternal lamps burning with ghī. Āratī is performed twice a day, and the temple priests are Brahmins. In the town, only ghī is used (never oil) and the chastity of women is strictly maintained. According to Durgāśaṁkara Kevaḷarāma Śāstrī the worship of Aṁbājī at this location dates at least to the 14th century.

== Transportation ==
There is a bus-station of Gujarat State Road Transport Corporation (GSRTC) connecting to all major cities of India, and a railway station is at Palanpur of Banaskantha district, North Gujarat, India.

=== Road ===
Ambaji can be reached through Himatnagar road which is connected with National Highway 48 (Mumbai to Delhi). The other road which Passes through Palanpur and Danta and connects with State Highway SH 56 to reach Ambaji.

=== Rail ===
The nearest Railway station is at Abu Road which comes under the administrative control of North Western Railway zone of the Indian Railways. It has direct rail links on the broad gauge to the cities of Ajmer Chennai, Thiruvananthapuram, Mysore, Bangalore, Pune, Mumbai, Jaipur, Jodhpur, Delhi, Dehradun, Muzaffarpur, Bareilly and Jammu. It is connected to most of the cities and towns in Gujarat such as Ahmedabad, Surat, Vadodara, Bhuj, Rajkot, Jamnagar and Porbandar. Indian Railways’ proposal to double the broad-gauge line between Palanpur and Samakhiali has received government backing. The doubling will benefit the districts of Kutch, Patan and Banaskantha in the state of Gujarat.

=== Air ===
The nearest international airport is Sardar Vallabhbhai Patel International Airport, Ahmedabad which is 179 km far from Ambaji Temple Town.

=== Distance from places ===
- From Surat it is 443 km away
- From Udaipur it is 157 km away
- From Ahmedabad it is 184 km away
- From Palanpur it is 65 km away
- From Abu Road it is 23 km away
- From Jodhpur it is 262 km away

=== Surrounding cities ===
- Northwest = Deesa
- North = Abu Road, Mount Abu
- Northeast = Udaipur
- West = Palanpur
- Center = Ambaji
- South = Himatnagar, Ahmedabad
- Southwest = Patan
- Southeast = Danta
- East = Idar

== See also ==
- Sacred mountains of India
