= Bardoli Lok Sabha constituency =

Lok Sabha Constituency in Gujarat

Coordinates: 21.11667°N 73.1167°E

Bardoli
- Lok Sabha constituency

Constituency details
- Country: India
- Region: Western India
- State: Gujarat
- Assembly constituencies: Mangrol; Mandvi; Kamrej; Bardoli; Mahuva; Vyara; Nizar
- Established: 2008
- Total electors: 20,48,408 (2024)
- Reservation: ST

Member of Parliament
- 18th Lok Sabha
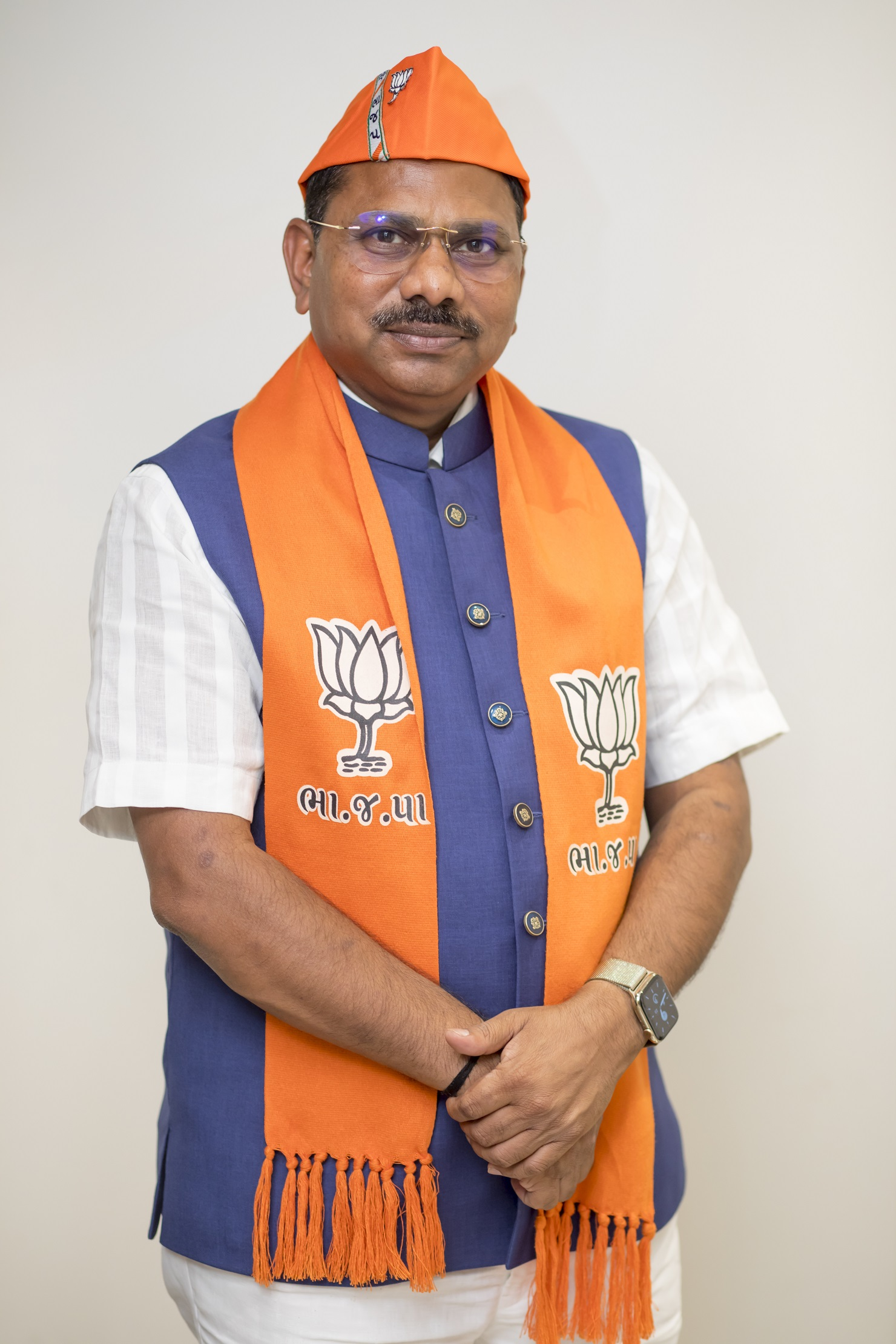
- Incumbent Parbhubhai Vasava
- Party: Bharatiya Janata Party
- Elected year: 2014

Bardoli is a Lok Sabha constituency in Gujarat, a state in western India. This constituency was created in 2008 as a part of the implementation of delimitation of parliamentary constituencies. The seat is reserved for Scheduled Tribes. It first held elections in 2009 and its first member of parliament (MP) was Tushar Amarsinh Chaudhary of the Indian National Congress. As of the latest elections in 2024, Parbhubhai Vasava of the Bharatiya Janata Party represents this constituency.

== Vidhan Sabha segments ==
As of 2014, Bardoli Lok Sabha constituency comprises seven Vidhan Sabha (legislative assembly) segments. These are:

Constituency number	Name	Reserved for (SC/ST/None)	District	Party	2024 Lead
156	Mangrol	ST	Surat	BJP	BJP
157	Mandvi	ST	Surat	BJP	INC
158	Kamrej	None	Surat	BJP	BJP
169	Bardoli	SC	Surat	BJP	BJP
170	Mahuva	ST	Surat	BJP	BJP
171	Vyara	ST	Tapi	BJP	INC
172	Nizar	ST	Tapi	BJP	INC

== Members of Parliament ==
Year	Winner	Party
from 1952-2008 : see Mandvi Lok Sabha
2009	Tushar Amarsinh Chaudhary	Indian National Congress
2014	Parbhubhai Vasava	Bharatiya Janata Party
2019	Parbhubhai Vasava	Bharatiya Janata Party
2024	Parbhubhai Vasava	Bharatiya Janata Party

== Election results ==
=== General election 2024 ===
2024 Indian general elections: Bardoli
Party	Candidate	Votes	%	±%
BJP	Parbhubhai Vasava	763,950	57.04	▲1.98
INC	Siddharth Chaudhary	5,33,697	39.85	▲0.77
NOTA	None of the Above	25,542	1.91	▲0.21
BSP	Rekhaben Chaudhari	16,144	1.21	▲0.50
Margin of victory		2,30,253	17.19	▲1.21
Turnout		13,43,633	65.58	▼8.31
BJP hold		Swing		

=== General election 2019 ===
2019 Indian general elections: Bardoli
Party	Candidate	Votes	%	±%
BJP	Parbhubhai Vasava	742,273	55.06	+3.43
INC	Tushar Amarsinh Chaudhary	5,26,826	39.08	−2.28
NOTA	None of the Above	22,914	1.70	−0.04
BTP	Vasava Uttambhai Somabhai	11,871	0.87	
BSP	Dineshbhai Gulabbhai Chaudhari	9,520	0.71	
Margin of victory		2,15,447	15.98	+5.71
Turnout		13,49,645	73.89	−1.05
BJP hold		Swing		

=== General election 2014 ===
2014 Indian general elections: Bardoli
Party	Candidate	Votes	%	±%
BJP	Parbhubhai Vasava	622,769	51.63	+10.86
INC	Tushar Amarsinh Chaudhary	4,98,885	41.36	−6.50
CPI	Revaben Chaudhary	13,270	1.10	−0.73
BSP	Movaliyabhai Nopariyabhai Gamit	11,625	0.96	−1.02
AAP	Chandubhai Machalabhai Chaudhari	10,842	0.90	N/A
Independent	Rameshbhai Bhikhabhai Rathod	8,607	0.71	N/A
JD(U)	Jagatsinh Laljibhai Vasava	7,321	0.61	−0.38
Independent	Surendrabhai Simabhai Gamit	5,351	0.44	N/A
Aadivasi Sena Party	Bhailalbhai Chhanabhai Rathod	5,334	0.44	N/A
Hindusthan Nirman Dal	Reniyabhai Shankarbhai Chaudhari	2,184	0.18	N/A
NOTA	None of the Above	19,991	1.66	N/A
Margin of victory		1,23,884	10.27	+3.18
Turnout		12,09,069	74.94	+17.14
BJP gain from INC		Swing		

=== General election 2009 ===
2009 Indian general elections: Bardoli
Party	Candidate	Votes	%	±%
INC	Tushar Amarsinh Chaudhary	398,323	47.86	N/A
BJP	Riteshkumar Vasava	339,445	40.77	N/A
Independent	Pravinsinh Vasava	26,269	3.16	N/A
BSP	Ranjanben Chimanbhai Gamit	16,478	1.98	N/A
CPI	Sonaben Bhikhubhai Patel	15,257	1.83	N/A
Independent	Sukabhai Mangabhai Rathod	10,655	1.28	N/A
JD(U)	Kamleshbhai Prabhubhai Chaudhari	8,215	0.99	N/A
Independent	Thakorbhai Manekjibhai Gamit	5,046	0.61	N/A
Independent	Sumanbhai Narsinhbhai Gamit	4,730	0.57	N/A
Maha–Gujarat Janta Party	Vijaykumar Haribhai Patel	3,177	0.38	N/A
Independent	Arjunbhai Bhaljibhai Chaudhari	2,496	0.30	N/A
SP	Pravinbhai Bhulabhai Rathod	2,344	0.28	N/A
Margin of victory		58,878	7.09	N/A
Turnout		832,542	57.81	N/A
INC win (new seat)				

== See also ==
- Mandvi Lok Sabha constituency
