= Joitabhai Patel =

Patel Joitabhai Kasnabhai is an Indian politician. He is a Former Member of the Gujarat Legislative Assembly from the Dhanera Assembly constituency since 2012 to 2017. He is associated with the Indian National Congress.
