= Danta, Banaskantha =

Danta
- city
- Location in Gujarat, India Danta (India)
- Coordinates: 24°12′11″N 72°44′41″E
- Country: India
- State: Gujarat
- Founder: King Dantariya Bhil
- Named for: Dantariya Bheel who was the ruler before the Barad Parmaras set up their kingdom

Languages
  - Official: Gujarati, Hindi
- Time zone: UTC+5:30 (IST)
- Vehicle registration: GJ
- Website: gujaratindia.com

Danta is a city in the taluka of the same name in the Banaskantha district of the Indian state of Gujarat. It lies about 150 km north of Ahmedabad city, and on the border of Gujarat with Rajasthan.

== Demography ==
The majority of residents are Hindu but there are also a substantial Muslim population and smaller ones of Christians and Jains.

== Politics ==
Since 1998, the Danta assembly seat has been held by Gadhvi Mukeshkumar Bhairavdanji of the Indian National Congress party.

== Distances ==
- Roughly 150 km from the Airport in Ahemdabad to Danta
- Nearest Railway station is 40 km from both Abu Road and Palanpur
- Udaipur — is about 2 1/2 hours to 3 hrs drive only.
- Ambaji Temple - 18 km
- Kumbhariya Jain Temple - 22 km
- Koteshwar Shiv Temple - 30 km
- Taranga Jain Temple - 30 km
- Rani-Ki-vav, Patan - 80 km
- Vadnagar Arches - 60 km
- Modhera Sun Temple - 90 km
- Mt. Abu - 70 km
