= Banaskantha district =

- District
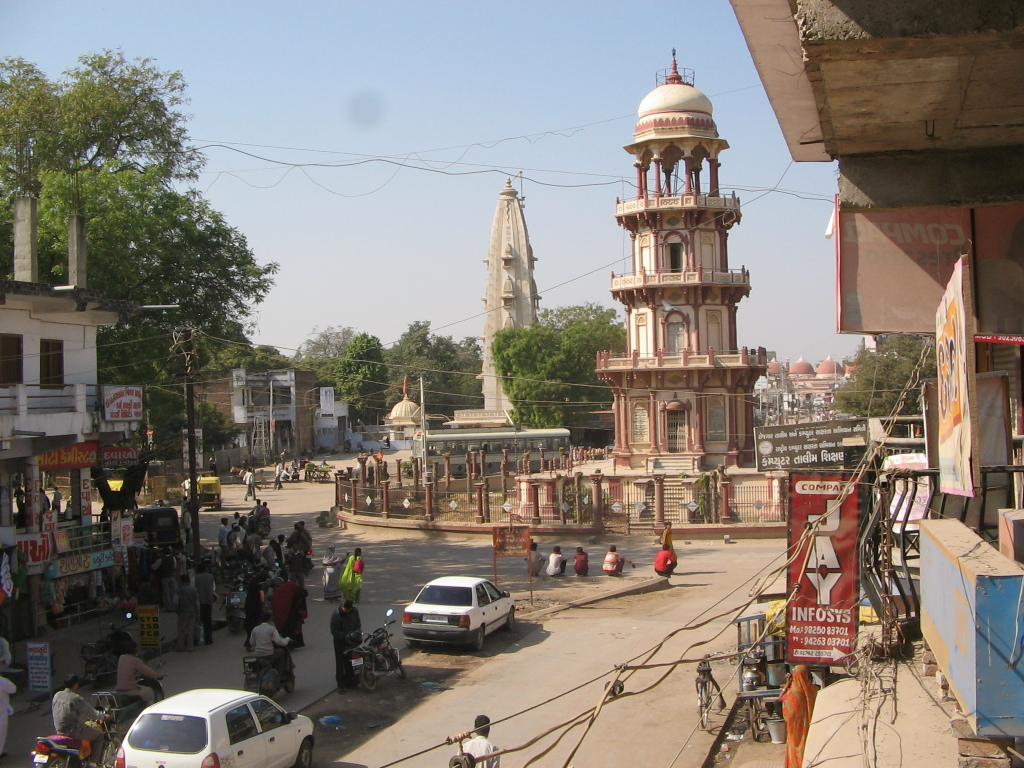
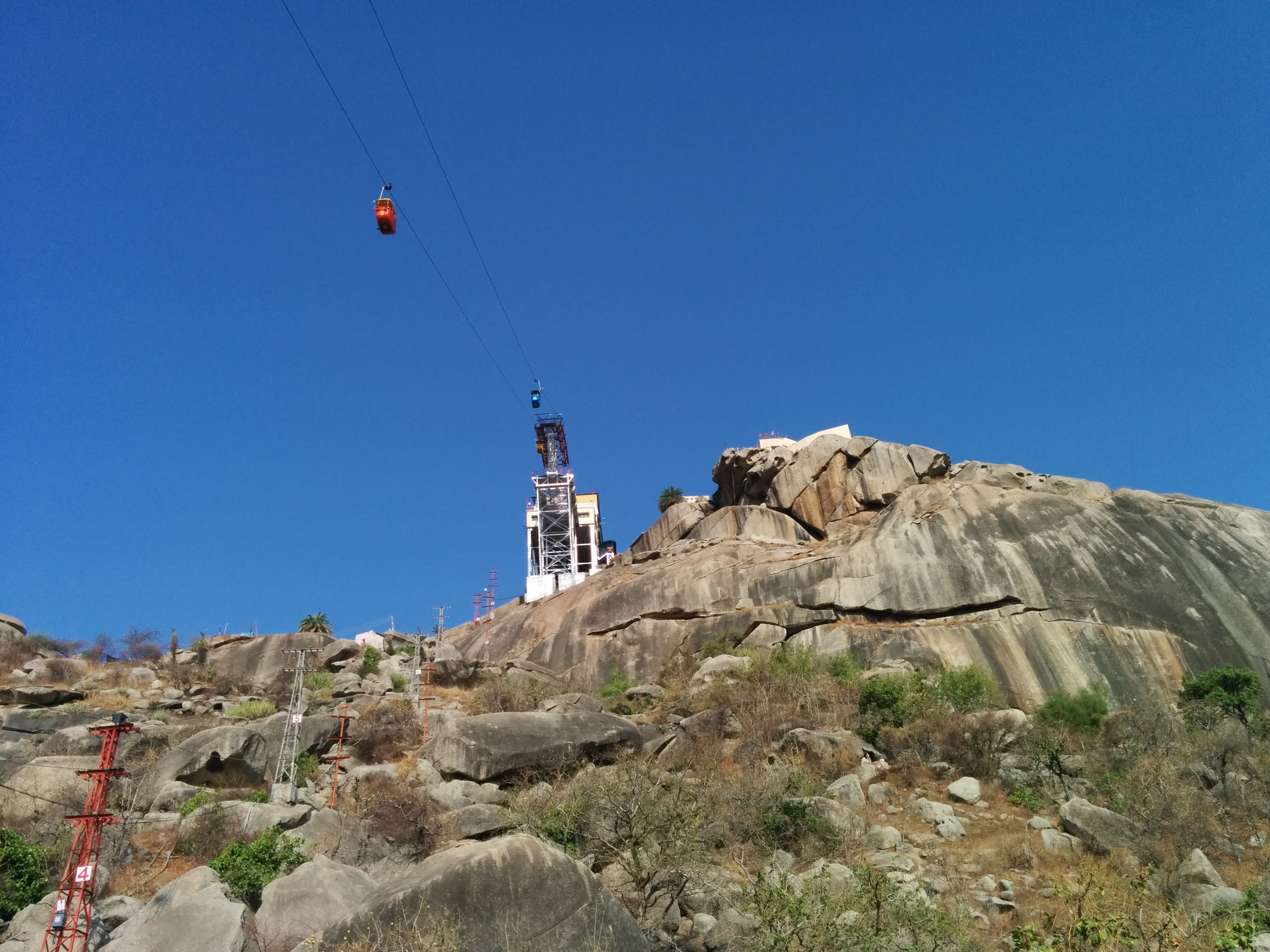
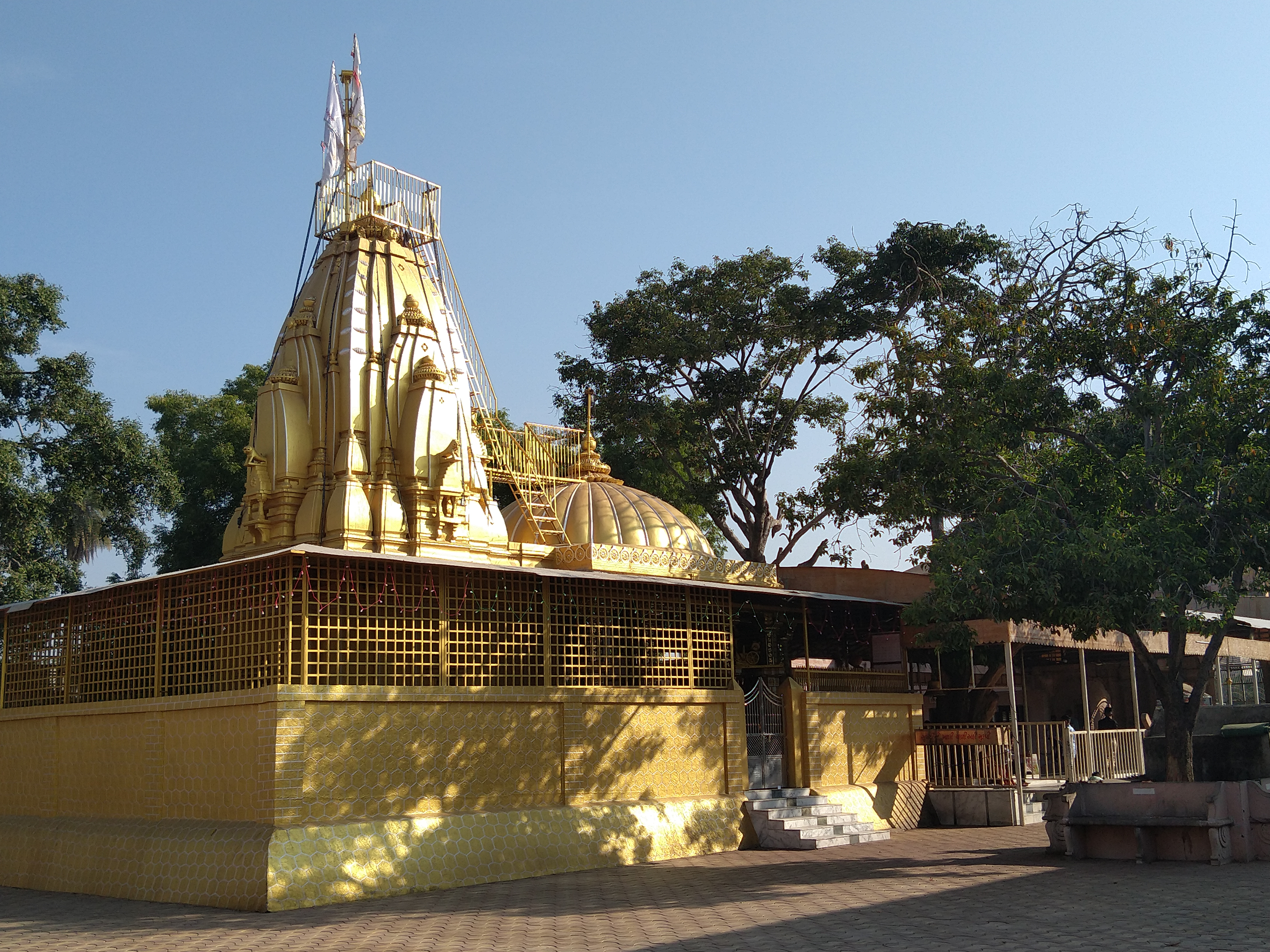
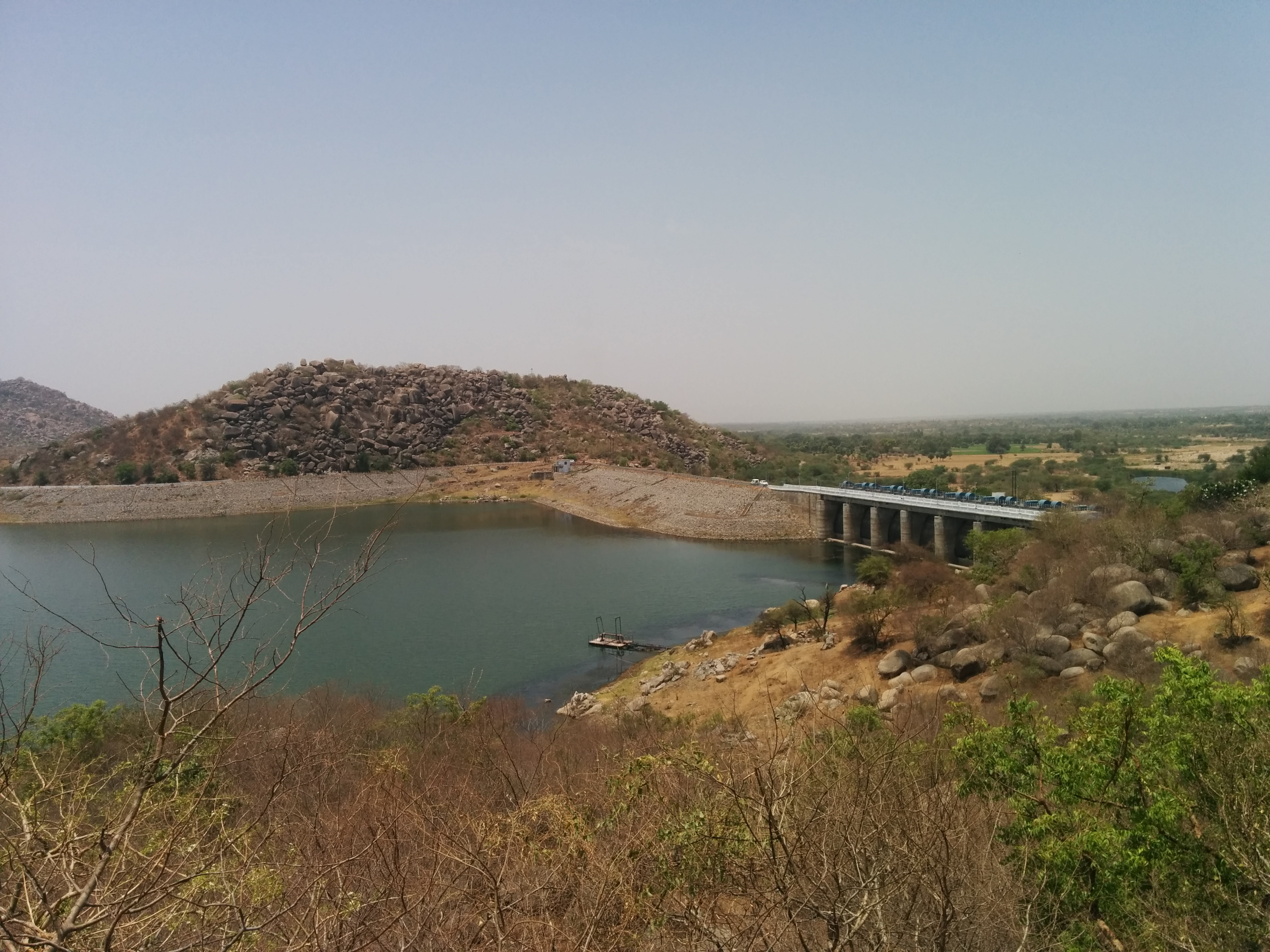
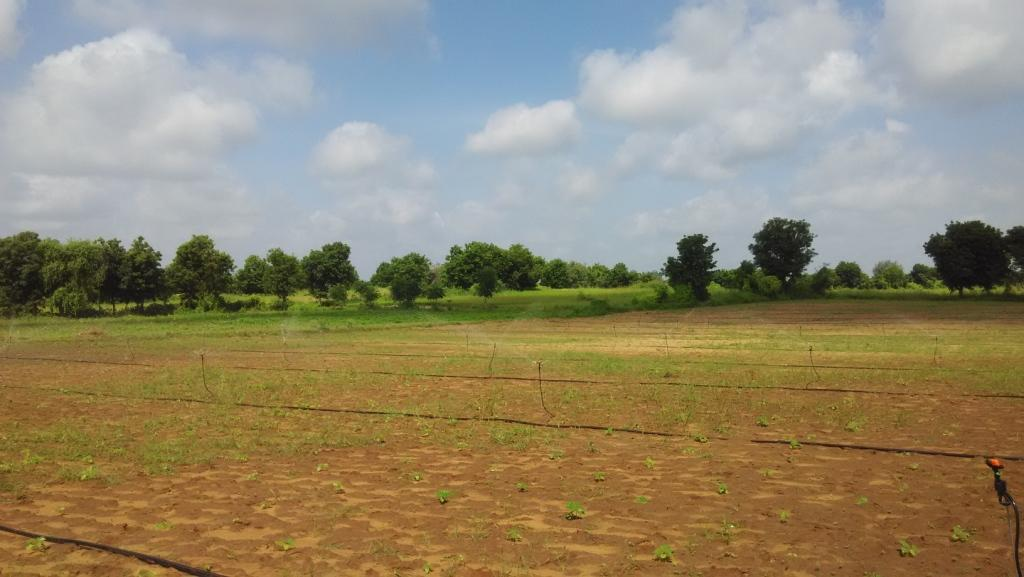
- from top-left: Kirti Stambha in Palanpur, Gabbar Temple in Ambaji, Mokeshwar Dam, fields in Vadgam, Manibhadra Jain Temple in Magarwada

- Location of Banaskantha district in Gujarat
- Coordinates: 24°10′23″N 72°25′53″E
- Country: India
- State: Gujarat
- Region: North Gujarat
- Established: 01 May 1960
- Named for: Banas River
- Headquarters: Palanpur

Area
  - Total: 6,176 km^{2} (2,385 sq mi)

Population (2011)
  - Total: 2,520,507
  - Rank: 111 of 640 in India; 5 of 26 in Gujarat
  - Density: 408.1/km^{2} (1,057/sq mi)

Languages
  - Official: Gujarati, Hindi
- Time zone: UTC+5:30 (IST)
- Vehicle registration: GJ 08
- Website: banaskantha.nic.in

Banaskantha district is one of the thirty-four districts of the Gujarat state of India. The administrative headquarters and largest city is Palanpur. The district is in northeastern Gujarat where the West Banas River runs through the valley between Mount Abu and Aravalli Range, flowing to the plains of Gujarat in this region. The district is famous for the Ambaji temple which draws many tourists. It has an area of 12,703 km^{2} and was the second largest district in the state until January 2025, when Vav-Tharad district was carved out of the western part of the district and remaining area of 6,176 km^{2} remains the same.

== Geography ==
Banaskantha shares its borders with Rajasthan. characterized by the Aravalli Range and the Banas River. Sabarkantha district in East, Vav-Tharad district in West and Patan district and Mehsana district in the South.

== Economy ==
It is the site of Sardarkrushinagar Dantiwada Agricultural University.

In 2006 the Ministry of Panchayati Raj named Banaskantha one of the country's 250 most backward districts (out of a total of 640). It is one of the six districts in Gujarat currently receiving funds from the Backward Regions Grant Fund Programme (BRGF).

== Talukas ==
There are 10 Talukas in Banaskantha District.

| Sr.No. | Taluka | Headquarter | Population (As of 2011) |
|---|---|---|---|
| 1 | Amirgadh Taluka | Amirgadh | 1,32,354 |
| 2 | Dhanera taluka | Dhanera | 2,30,749 |
| 3 | Deesa taluka | Deesa | 5,88,123 |
| 4 | Danta taluka | Danta | 3,09,571 |
| 5 | Dantiwada taluka | Dantiwada | 83,528 |
| 6 | Palanpur taluka | Palanpur | 1,77,953 |
| 7 | Vadagam taluka | Vadgam | 87,201 |
| 8 | Kankrej taluka | Shihori | 2,36,168 |
| 9 | Hadad taluka | Hadad |
| 10 | Ogad taluka | Thara |
| District | Banaskantha | | 24,54,196 |

== Municipality ==
- Dhanera
- Deesa
- Palanpur
- Thara

== Demographics ==
Historical population
| Year | Pop. | ±% p.a. |
|---|---|---|
| 1901 | 437,072 | — |
| 1911 | 418,450 | −0.43% |
| 1921 | 440,891 | +0.52% |
| 1931 | 477,341 | +0.80% |
| 1941 | 548,737 | +1.40% |
| 1951 | 696,367 | +2.41% |
| 1961 | 899,989 | +2.60% |
| 1971 | 1,146,159 | +2.45% |
| 1981 | 1,514,121 | +2.82% |
| 1991 | 1,981,513 | +2.73% |
| 2001 | 2,504,244 | +2.37% |
| 2011 | 3,120,506 | +2.22% |

According to the 2011 census Banaskantha district has a population of 3,120,506, roughly equal to the nation of Mongolia or the US state of Iowa. This gives it a ranking of 111th in India (out of a total of 640). The district has a population density of 290 inhabitants per square kilometre (750/sq mi) . Its population growth rate over the decade 2001-2011 was 24.43%. Banaskantha has a sex ratio of 936 females for every 1000 males, and a literacy rate of 66.39%. Scheduled Castes and Scheduled Tribes make up 10.49% and 9.11% of the population respectively.

Religions in Banaskantha district (2011)
| Religion | Percent |
| Hinduism | 92.62% |
| Islam | 6.84% |
| Other or not stated | 0.54% |

=== Language ===
Languages of Banaskantha district (2011)
1. Gujarati (96.3%)
2. Hindi (0.91%)
3. Marwari (0.60%)
4. Others (2.74%)

According to the 2011 Census of India, 96.35% of the population in the district spoke Gujarati and 0.91% Hindi as their first language.

== Politics ==
| District | No. | Constituency | Name | Party | Remarks |
|---|---|---|---|---|---|
| Banaskantha & Vav-Tharad | 7 | Vav | Geniben Thakor | Indian National Congress | Elected to 18th Loksabha |
| Banaskantha & Vav-Tharad | 7 | Vav | Swarupji Thakor | Bharatiya Janata Party | Elected on 23 November 2024 |
| Banaskantha & Vav-Tharad | 8 | Tharad | Shankarbhai Chaudhary | Bharatiya Janata Party | Speaker |
| Banaskantha & Vav-Tharad | 9 | Dhanera | Mavjibhai Desai | Independent | |
| Banaskantha & Vav-Tharad | 10 | Danta (ST) | Kantibhai Kharadi | Indian National Congress | |
| Banaskantha & Vav-Tharad | 11 | Vadgam (SC) | Jignesh Mevani | Indian National Congress | |
| Banaskantha & Vav-Tharad | 12 | Palanpur | Aniket Thakar | Bharatiya Janata Party | |
| Banaskantha & Vav-Tharad | 13 | Deesa | Pravin Mali | Bharatiya Janata Party | |
| Banaskantha & Vav-Tharad | 14 | Deodar | Keshaji Chauhan | Bharatiya Janata Party | |
| Banaskantha & Vav-Tharad | 15 | Kankrej | Amrutbhai Thakor | Indian National Congress | |

== Notable people ==
- Pravin Shah = Producer of Hindi movies
- Babubhai Desai Member of Parliament Rajya Sabha Gujarat Former MLA Kankrej_Assembly_constituency
- Shankar Chaudhary - Speaker of Gujarat Legislative Assembly & Chairman of Banas Dairy
- Mavji Desai -MLA of Dhanera Assembly constituency.
- Govabhai_Hamirabhai_Rabari former MLA of Dhanera Assembly constituency
- Parthi Bhatol, Politician & Former Chairman of Gujarat Cooperative Milk Marketing Federation (Amul); Former Banas Dairy Chairman
- Chandrakant Bakshi, author born in Palanpur.
- Parbatbhai Patel, former MP from Banaskantha; Former Minister of State Water Resources (Independent Charge), Water Supply, Government of Gujarat
- Haribhai Parthibhai Chaudhary, former Minister of State of Home Affairs and former MP for Banaskantha
- Harisinh Chavda, former MP for Banaskantha
- B. K. Gadhvi, former MP and Minister of State, Banaskantha
- Mukesh Gadhvi, former MP for Banaskantha
- Jayasimha Siddharaja, ruler of Gujarat from the Chaulukya dynasty; great-grandfather of Prithviraj Chauhan
- Pranav Mistry, inventor of Sixthsense and vice president of Samsung, USA
- Mehul Choksi, Diamond merchant
- Nirav Modi, Diamond merchant
- Bharat Shah, Bollywood film producer
- Dineshchandra R. Agrawal, Chairman & MD (CMD) of DRA Infracon
