= Deesa =

City in Banaskantha, Gujarat, India

- city
- Location in Gujarat, India Deesa (India)
- Coordinates: 24°15′0.4″N 72°10′56″E
- Country: India
- State: Gujarat
- District: Banaskantha

Government
  - Body: Deesa Municipality

Area
  - Total: 20.08 km^{2} (7.75 sq mi)

Population (2021)
  - Total: 111 160
  - Rank: 30th (Gujarat)
  - Density: 5.53/km^{2} (14.3/sq mi)

Languages
  - Official: Gujarati, Hindi
- Time zone: UTC+5:30 (IST)
- PIN: 385530, 385535, 385540
- Telephone code: 02744-xxxxxx
- Vehicle registration: GJ08-xxxx
- Climate: Aw
- Website: https://www.deesanagarpalika.com/

Deesa is a city and a municipality in the Banaskantha district in the state of Gujarat, India.

== History ==
Deesa is situated on the east banks of the West Banas River. Deesa was an estate and thana (faujdari or thanedari) ruled by the Mandori (Jhalori) dynasty. Today original Deesa is known as Juna Deesa.

New Deesa was also recognized as Camp Deesa. In 1820, the British military cantonment named Deesa Field Brigade was built in the middle of Rajasthan and Palanpur to maintain and protect the regions between Abu and Kutch from dacoits and the incursions of the desert and Parkar Khosas into Vagad and north-west Gujarat. The cantonment had a resident Catholic chaplain and a chapel.

Deesa, as an estate of Palanpur, was under Palanpur Agency of Bombay Presidency, which in 1925 became the Banas Kantha Agency. After Independence of India in 1947, Bombay Presidency was reorganized in Bombay State. When Gujarat state was formed in 1960 from Bombay State, it fell under Banaskantha district of Gujarat. Deesa expanded significantly in recent times due to growth in agricultural produce business of potatoes and other commodities. Many Rajput clans like Gohil, Rathod, Raja, Galsar etc. reside here after migration from Rajasthan.

Deesa has a non-functioning airport.

== Climate ==
The hottest area (city) of Gujarat

Climate data for Deesa (1991–2020, extremes 1901–present)
Month	Jan	Feb	Mar	Apr	May	Jun	Jul	Aug	Sep	Oct	Nov	Dec	Year
Record high °C (°F)	34.4 (93.9)	40.6 (105.1)	43.4 (110.1)	46.3 (115.3)	49.4 (120.9)	47.4 (117.3)	43.0 (109.4)	41.0 (105.8)	42.5 (108.5)	42.2 (108.0)	39.1 (102.4)	35.6 (96.1)	49.4 (120.9)
Mean daily maximum °C (°F)	27.1 (80.8)	30.2 (86.4)	35.3 (95.5)	39.1 (102.4)	40.7 (105.3)	38.9 (102.0)	34.2 (93.6)	32.3 (90.1)	34.2 (93.6)	36.6 (97.9)	33.3 (91.9)	29.3 (84.7)	34.3 (93.7)
Mean daily minimum °C (°F)	10.1 (50.2)	12.7 (54.9)	18.0 (64.4)	22.5 (72.5)	25.7 (78.3)	26.9 (80.4)	25.7 (78.3)	24.7 (76.5)	24.1 (75.4)	20.9 (69.6)	16.1 (61.0)	11.8 (53.2)	19.9 (67.8)
Record low °C (°F)	2.8 (37.0)	2.0 (35.6)	6.5 (43.7)	11.2 (52.2)	18.4 (65.1)	13.1 (55.6)	19.7 (67.5)	14.8 (58.6)	17.0 (62.6)	11.8 (53.2)	8.3 (46.9)	2.2 (36.0)	2.0 (35.6)
Average rainfall mm (inches)	1.9 (0.07)	0.6 (0.02)	1.0 (0.04)	1.4 (0.06)	4.3 (0.17)	70.1 (2.76)	271.7 (10.70)	180.4 (7.10)	121.9 (4.80)	14.7 (0.58)	1.8 (0.07)	0.9 (0.04)	670.7 (26.41)
Average rainy days	0.2	0.2	0.0	0.2	0.3	2.8	8.4	7.6	4.3	0.8	0.1	0.1	25.0
Average relative humidity (%) (at 17:30 IST)	36	29	23	24	27	41	62	67	55	33	34	38	39
Source: India Meteorological Department

== Demographics ==
As per provisional reports of Census of India, population of Deesa in 2011 is 111,149; of which male and female are 58,724 and 52,425 respectively. The sex ratio of Deesa city is 895 per 1000 males.

== Places ==
There are the Swaminarayan temple, Jalaram Temple, Soneshwar Mahadev Temple, Vishveshvar Mahadev Temple and also two Jain temples and a mosque.

A tower known as Hawai Pillar was constructed by the British in 1824 to measure air pressure. It is renovated in 2013 as a heritage monument.

Deesa Airport

== Education ==
=== Computer Class & Accounting Classes ===
- NEW EDUCATION POINT (2) Bhavani Computer Education Center
- Bhavani Account Classes

=== Schools ===
- Sir Charles Watson High School, established in 1853, is one of the oldest schools in Deesa and also State of Gujarat. It is run by Deesa Nagar Palika. It has twenty-one classrooms and an enrolment capacity of 1500 students.
- Blue Lotus International School (KG to 12 - English and Gujarati Medium) with 37 classrooms and enrollment capacity of 1500 students.
- St. Xavier's School
- DNJ Adarsh School
- St. Anne's School (Only KG and 1 to 10 standard)
- Sardar Patel School
- Angels English School (KG and 1 to 12 standard Science, Commerce, Arts)
- Vibrant School Of Science
- model school deesa

=== Colleges ===
- DNP Arts and Commerce College
- Smt. Chandanben S.S. Shah BCA College
- Bets B.Sc., BCA, BBA, PGDCA, Rasana Mota College
- Students Poitics
- NSUI :
- Maheshsinh Thakor (President Deesa Taluka NSUI)
- Kilas Rajpurohit (President deesa City nsui)
- Suresh Desai (President dnp college deesa)

== Economy ==
=== Agriculture ===
Deesa is known for its potato plantations. Considering the area under cultivation and agro-climatic conditions for potato research, a centre of All India Co-ordinated Potato Improvement Project was initiated in 1971–72, with the financial help of Indian Council of Agricultural Research (ICAR), New Delhi. Thereafter ICAR realized the need for multidisciplinary long-range research for increasing the production of this valuable crop and strengthened the project during Fifth Five Year Plan (1975–80) to have systematic research work on potato started to overcome the farmers problems of the state. Sardarkrushinagar Dantiwada Agricultural University runs a potato research station in Deesa. It falls under the North Gujarat Agroclimatic Zone-IV of the State.

The town is also major medical hub in the region.

== See also ==
- Rajpur Deesa Panjarapole
- SHREE RAM MULTIPLEX CINEMA DEESA
