= History of Radhanpur =

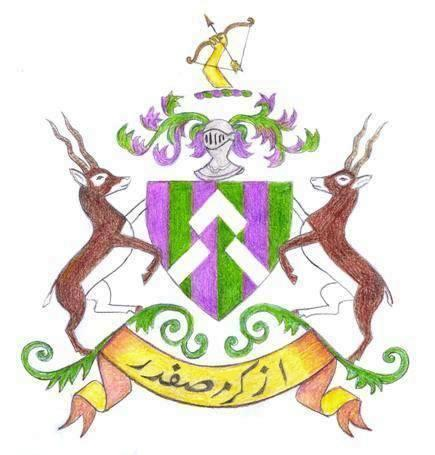
Coat of arms of Radhanpur State

Radhanpur is a town and a municipality in Patan district in the Indian state of Gujarat. Radhanpur belonged to the Vaghelas in early years and later it was held as a fief under the Gujarat Sultanate by Fateh Khan Baloch. During Mughal period, the descendants of Babi dynasty were appointed as the governor of Radhanpur and other villages of North Gujarat. After decline of Mughal, they became free and established themselves as independent rulers. In 1743, Babi descendant Jawan Mard Khan II took over viceroyalty of Ahmedabad and controlled several villages in North Gujarat.He was defeated by vaghela Un Jagir in 1753. He was defeated by Maratha Gaekwads in 1753 at Ahmedabad and Gaekwads agreed to his demand of control of villages in North Gujarat headquartered at Radhanpur State. His descendants lost some of these villages to Gaekwads subsequently. In 1813, Sher Khan made a treaty with the Gaekwar and British and became British protectorate. His descendants ruled the state until independence of India in 1947.

Radhanpur State was under Palanpur Agency of Bombay Presidency, which became part of Banas Kantha Agency in 1925. Bombay Presidency was reorganised as Bombay State after independence. In 1960, Gujarat was formed from Bombay State and Radhanpur fell under its Banaskantha district.

== History ==
=== Early history ===
Radhanpur belonged to the Vaghelas and was known as Lunavada after Vaghela Lunaji of the Sardhara branch of that tribe. Subsequently, it was held as a fief under Ahmad Shah III of Gujarat Sultanate, by Fateh Khan Baloch, and is said to have been named Radhanpur after Radhan Khan of that family. According to another tradition the town is as old as 546, and was originally called Radandevpur, from Radan Dev a Chavda chief.

The first Babi that entered India was one who accompanied Mughal emperor Humayun (1530–1556). According to another account the founder of the family came from Isphahan in Persia, and entered the service of Sultan Muzaffar III of Gujarat Sultanate (1561–1572). After the time of Akbar, they were attached to Gujarat, where one Bahadur Khan Babi was, in the reign of Shah Jahan (1627–1658), appointed manager of Tharad, and his son Sher Khan Babi was (1654–1657) sent to aid Prince Murad Baksh in the government of Gujarat. In 1663, he was made manager, thanadar, of Chunval. In 1693, his son Jaffar Khan, whose talent and local influence gained him the title of Safdar Khan and the charge of Radhanpur, Sami, Munjpur, and Tervada states, was deputy governor of Patan and eleven years later (1704) governor of Bijapur. In 1706, he was made governor of Patan. His son, Khan Jahan or Khanji Khan, with the title of Jawan Mard Khan, was, in 1715, appointed governor of Radhanpur, and, in 1725, of Patan. Four years later, while governor of Petlad, dying by the hand of a Koli of Balor, his eldest son Kamal-ud-din Khan was given the title of Jawan Mard Khan, and his second son Muhammad Anwar, the title of Safdar Khan, with the charge of Radhanpur, Sami, Munjpur, Tharad, Tervada and Varahi, and 15,000 acres (30,000 bighas) of land in an islet in the Greater Rann of Kutch.

During the next twenty-five years, (1729–1744), Jawan Mard Khan was one of the strongest of the Gujarat nobles, and, at the same time, a branch of the house established itself at Junagadh in Kathiawar and at Balasinor in the Rewa Kantha. The founder of the Junagadh house, who was also the first Babi of Balasinor, was Muhammad Bahadur, otherwise known as Sher Khan. In 1730, Jawan Mard Khan was appointed governor of Vadnagar, and three years later of Viramgam. From Viramgara he was, in the next year, transferred to Kadi and Bijapur, and, in 1738, was sent to Patan, his brother Zorawar Khan getting Kheralu instead of Prantij. About 1743, Jawan Mard Khan began to aspire to the post of Viceroy. He was already laying claim to the revenue of the district round Ahmedabad, when Fida-ud-din, who had, by a forged order, usurped the viceroyalty, appointed Jawan Mard Khan his deputy. Soon after, Fida-ud-din's troops mutinied and he fled leaving Jawan Mard Khan in possession of the city. Jawan Mard Khan now usurped the viceroyalty, and opposed and defeated the next two Viceroys, Muftakhir Khan and Fakhr-ud-daulah. A third Viceroy Maharaja Vakhatsing never took up his appointment.

=== Radhanpur State ===
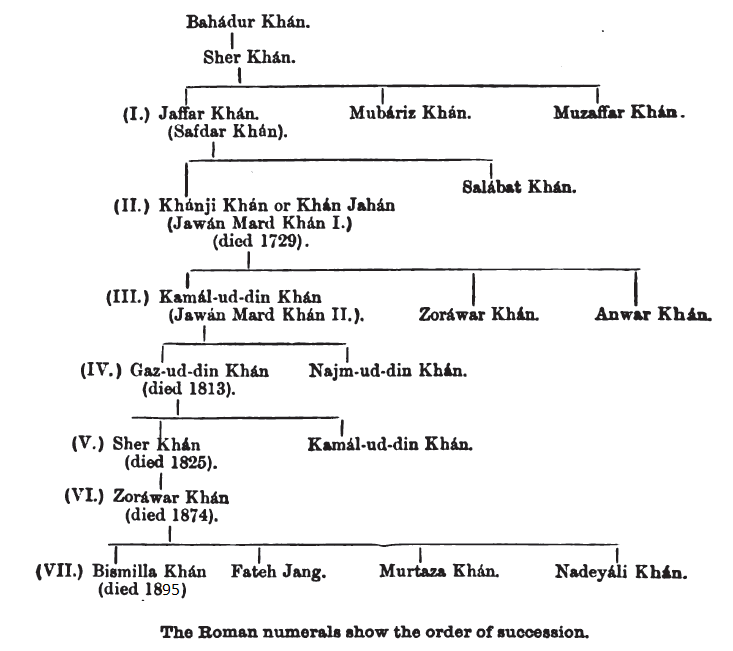
Radhanpur State Ruler Family Tree

Nawabs of Radhanpur

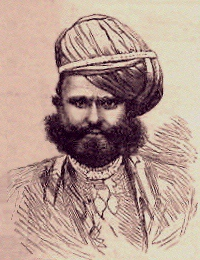
Zorawar Khan

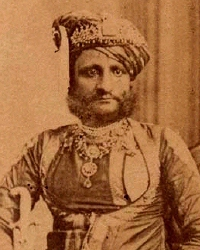
Bismillah Khan

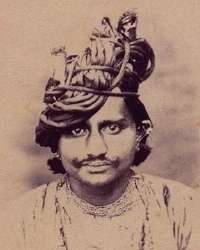
Sher Khan II

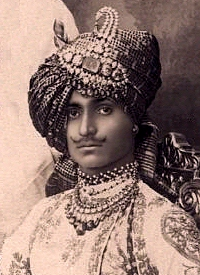
Jalaluddin Khan

In 1753, while Jawan Mard Khan and his brother Zorawar Khan were levying tribute in Sabarkantha, Raghunathrao Peshwa and Damaji Gaekwad suddenly appeared before Ahmedabad. Hastening by forced marches, Jawan Mard Khan reached Ahmedabad and by night succeeded in entering the city. After a defence, his funds failed him and he was forced to surrender. It was agreed that, for himself and his brothers, Jawan Mard Khan should receive, free from any Maratha claim, the districts of Patan, Vadnagar, Sami, Munjpur, Visalnagar, Tharad, Kheralu, Radhanpur with Tervada, and Bijapur, and that one of Jawan Mard Khan's brothers should serve the Marathas with 300 horse and 500 foot, the expenses of the force being paid by the Marathas.

In 1757, he helped Marathas to regain Ahmedabad from Momin Khan and later he retired to Patan again. After death of Jawan Mard Khan, in 1765, Damaji Gaekwad succeeded in wresting states from his sons, Gazuddin Khan and Nazmuddin Khan. Sami and Munjpur were kept by Gaz-ud-din Khan, and Radhanpur, Tharad, and Tervada by his brother, who, dying childless in 1787, the districts lapsed to the elder brother. Gaz-ud-din Khan had two sons, Sher Khan and Kamal-ud-din Khan. On his death in 1813, the elder son kept Radhanpur and the younger, Sami and Munjpur. Tharad and Tervada seem to have been lost.

Shortly after his accession, Sher Khan made a treaty with the Gaekwar and British. Thus Radhanpur became a British protectorate on 16 December 1813. In 1819 the British helped the Nawab to expel the Khosa raiders, a predatory tribe which used to make incursions from Sindh. Kamal-ud-din Khan, dying in 1824, his elder brother succeeded to the estate and died in 1825. He was succeeded by his illegitimate son Zorawar Khan, a child of three years old, Sardar Bibi, the second wife of the late Nawab, being appointed regent. When of age, in 1837, Zorawar Khan was entrusted with the management of the state, and, after ruling for fifty years, was, in October 1874, succeeded by his eldest son Bismilla Khan. He died in 1895 and was succeeded by Sher Khan II and subsequently by Jalal ad-Din Khan in 1910 who were minors so British administrators took charge of the regency of the state on both occasions. Jalaluddin Khan took over control of state in 1935 but died the next year. He was succeeded by Murtuza Khan who ruled until 1947.

Radhanpur State was under Palanpur Agency of Bombay Presidency, which in 1925 became the Banas Kantha Agency. In 1943, with the implementation of the 'attachment scheme', Radhanpur State enlarged its territory by an additional 2,234 km^{2} when some lesser princely states were merged. The population of the merged territories was about 33,000 inhabitants, which brought the total population of Radhanpur State to 100,644. After Independence of India in 1947, Bombay Presidency was reorganized in Bombay State. When Gujarat state was formed in 1960 from Bombay State, it fell under Banaskantha district.
