= Diyodar =

Town in Banaskantha district

Coordinates: 24.1075868°N 71.7677945°E

Diyodar, also spelled Diodar or Deodar, is a town and former princely state in Diyodar Taluka of Vav-Tharad district in Gujarat, western India.

== History ==
Diyodar was ruled by the Bhilria Vaghela Rajput dynasty, who, on the overthrow of Rajput power in Patan, took (1297) Bhildi, near Palanpur, and for some generations held it. Driven out by the Muslims, they, in turn, held Samav in Kankrej, Munjpur in Radhanpur, and Tervada in Tharad, and, again ousted by the Muslims, took Diyodar. Once an estate of eighty-four villages, Diyodar reduced to half of its size as it lost areas to the Kankrej and Bhabhar Kolis. In the famine of 1786 the district was deserted, the chief with his family seeking a maintenance elsewhere.

Punjaji, one of the Bhayad, took service with the Nawab of Radhanpur, and giving much satisfaction, was helped by the Nawab to win back the Diyodar district from the Kolis, who had taken it when the Vaghelas left. Punjaji, at considerable expense, re-established some of the villages, and, in the absence of the elder branch, usurped its rights, and refused to restore them on the return of the chief.

The district was shared by the two sons of Punjabi, Akhesing and Chandaji, who were considered the chiefs of Diyodar, in supersession of the elder branch. Akhesing and Chandaji have died, and Maluji, son of Akhesing, and Bhupatsing, grandson of Chandaji, became the Thakors.

Diyodar entered into agreements with the British Government in 1820s. It was under Palanpur Agency of Bombay Presidency, which in 1925 became the Banas Kantha Agency. After Independence of India in 1947, Bombay Presidency was reorganized in Bombay State. When Gujarat state was formed in 1960 from Bombay State, it fell under Vav-Tharad district of Gujarat.
