= Chadchat =

Region in Gujarat, India

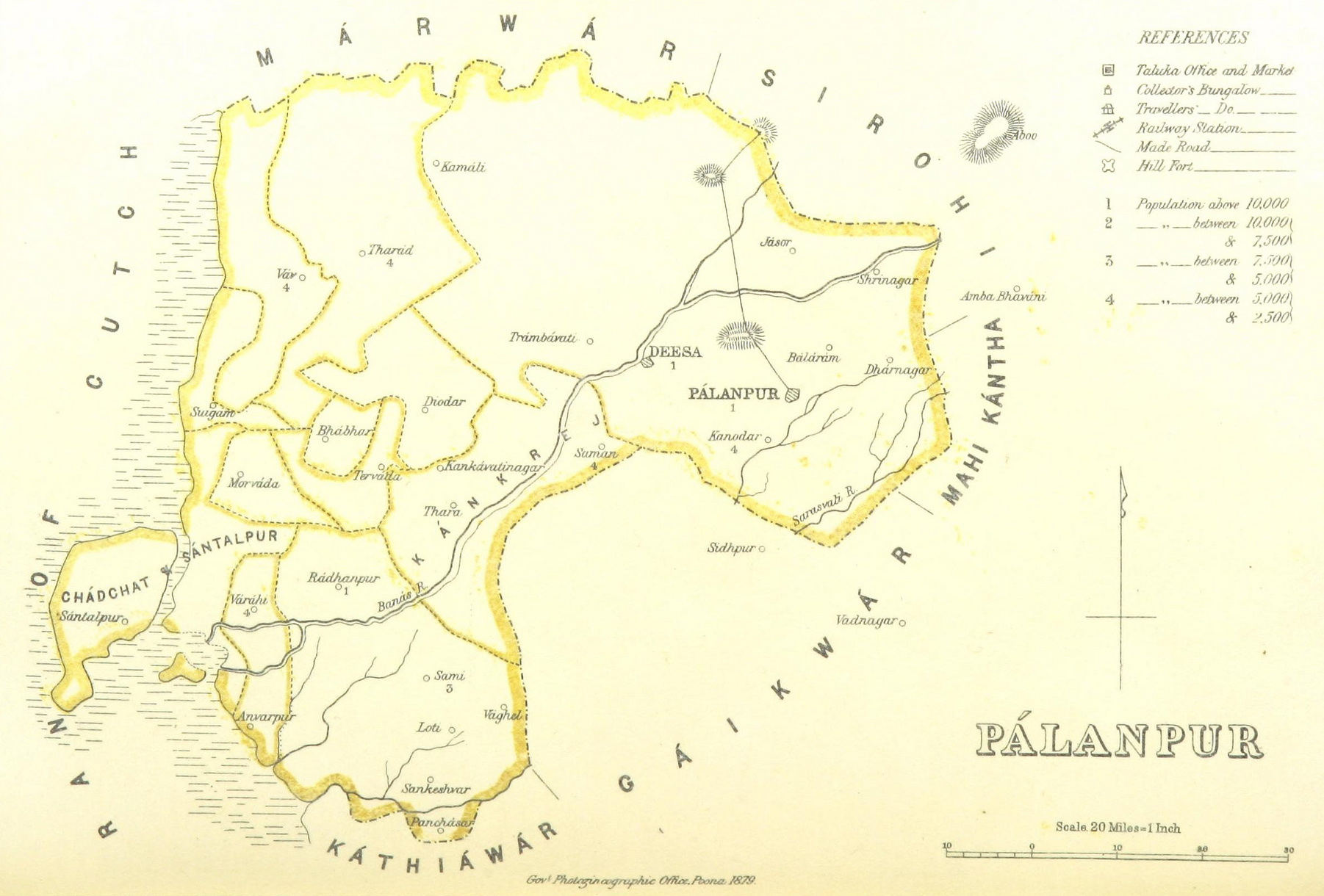
Chadchat, an extreme left region of Palanpur Agency, 1896

Chadchat is a region surrounding Santalpur in Patan district of Gujarat, India.

== History ==
Chadchat is said to take its name from the Chavad or Chad Chadchat branch of the Parmar tribe who conquered the district, till then occupied by Turks, probably the same who settled at Santalpur. This tribe was afterwards known in history as the Chavad Rajputs, though in reality a sub-division of the ancient tribe of Parmars. Five Chadchat villages were wrested from the Jadejas by Vaghela Kanji of Morvada and annexed to his domain. These states are divided amongst a number of chiefs, the principal of whom were Devising, and Lakhaji during British times.

These states made agreements with the British Government in 1820s. It was under Palanpur Agency of Bombay Presidency, which in 1925 became the Banas Kantha Agency. After Independence of India in 1947, Bombay Presidency was reorganized in Bombay State. When Gujarat state was formed in 1960 from Bombay State, it fell under Gujarat.
