= Varahi, Gujarat =

Village in Gujarat state, India

Coordinates: 23.763241°N 71.167°E

Varahi is a village in Santalpur taluka of Patan district of Gujarat state of India.

== History ==
Varahi was held by the Ravnias before it was wrested by Jat holders. These Jats, originally inhabitants of Vangabazar in Sindh, are said to have come in 711 with the army of Muhammad Kasim. It is said that a ruler of Sindh asked Malik Umar Khan to get his daughter married to him, but Malik Umar Khan refused and upon his refusal, he was forced to leave and fled to Dadhana state, and then into Kutch state, the Rao Raydhan the then ruler of Kutch refused them shelter. Finding no shelter, they came to Kathiawar where the Parmars of Muli state helped them. In return for their services at the siege of Champaner (1484), Mahmud Begada gave the Jats the district of Bajana in Jhalavad. Afterwards they got leave to attack Mandal, and took it after some days fighting. Before long, falling into disfavour with the Ahmedabad government, Mandal was taken from them, and the family was split into many branches, of which the chief were Malik Haidar Khan's at Bajana, Malik Lakha's at Sitapur and Vanod, and Malik Isaji's at Valivda. Malik Isaji, called in to settle a quarrel between Ravnias Godar and Lakha of Varahi, took advantage of their dissensions to slay the one and drive away the other, who, after holding out for some time in the village of Lunkhan, fled to Konmer Katari in Chor Vaghar, and settled there. The Ravnias, who stayed in Varahi, were given the villages of Mehmudabad, Javantri, and Antarnes, while Malik Isaji assumed the chiefdom of Varahi.

Varahi was attacked by British forces in 1812 with help and order of Peshwa's government. Varahi was defeated, and their chief Umar Khan was taken as prisoner and sent to Radhanpur. Afterwards, escaping from confinement, the Nawab, in 1815, confirmed him in his possessions. Varahi became British protectorate in 1819–1820. Thakor Shadad Khan died in 1847, leaving three widows, two of whom were brought to bed of sons eight months after his death. The legitimacy of the children was questioned by the next of kin; but their proofs failed, and Malik Umar Khan, the elder child was named chief, and his estate managed by the Political Superintendent.

Varahi was under Palanpur Agency of Bombay Presidency, which in 1925 became the Banas Kantha Agency. After Independence of India in 1947, Bombay Presidency was reorganized in Bombay State. When Gujarat state was formed in 1960 from Bombay State, it fell under Mehsana district of Gujarat. Later it became part of Patan district.
