= Pindharpura =

- Village
- Location in Gujarat, India Pindharpura (India)
- Coordinates: 23.70649°N 72.24232°E
- Country: India
- State: Gujarat
- District: Patan

Population (2010)
  - Total: 3,841

Languages
  - Official: Gujarati, Hindi
- Time zone: UTC+5:30 (IST)
- PIN: 384229
- Vehicle registration: GJ
- Website: gujaratindia.com

Pindharpura is a village in Patan district, Gujarat, India with a population of around 4,000.

Pindharpura is 13.3 km from Chanasma. Pindharpura is 41.9 km from Patan. And 67 km from Gandhinagar.

Bhatsar, Bhatvasana, Brahmanvada, Dantkarodi, Dharmoda and Dharpuri are the villages along with this village in the same Chanasma Taluk

Pindharpura's PIN code is 384229.

Its primary industry is agriculture.
