= Boratwada =

Boratwada Boratvada
- village
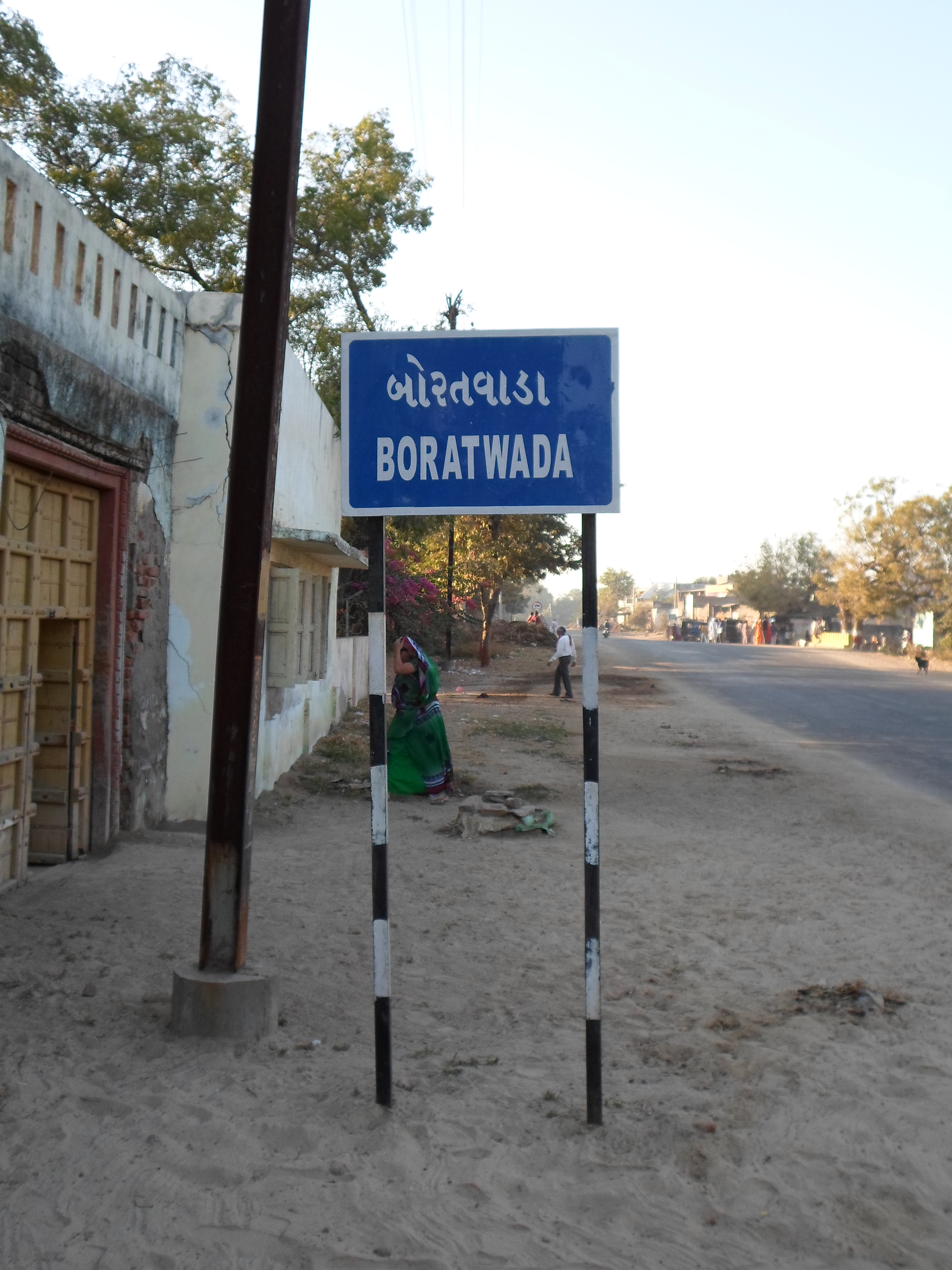
- Boratwada village sign on Harij–Patan State Highway

- Location in Gujarat, India Boratwada (India)
- Coordinates: 23.722°N 71.926°E
- Country: India
- State: Gujarat
- District: Patan
- Talukas: Patan

Population
  - Total: 3,580

Languages
  - Official: Gujarati, Hindi
- Time zone: UTC+5:30 (IST)
- PIN: 384240
- Vehicle registration: GJ 24
- Website: gujaratindia.com

Boratwada is a village located in Harij taluka of Patan district in Northern Gujarat, India.
