= Tervada =

Village in Gujarat state, India

Coordinates: 24.0349244°N 71.6651553°E

Tervada is a village in Kankrej Taluka of Banaskantha district in Gujarat, India.

== History ==
Tervada, once the chief town of a large district. Under the Gujarat Sultanate of Ahmedabad, Tervada together with Radhanpur, Morbi, Sami, Munjpur Kankrej, Santalpur, and Tharad, came into the hands of Fateh Khan and Akbar Khan Sardar khan Talukdar darbar, members of one of the most powerful families of Gujarat nobles who probably came from Sindh. With Tervada as their headquarters, the Baloch family continued to hold these lands till, early in the eighteenth century, they were taken by Nawab Kamal-ud-din Khan Babi, and confirmed to him by the Viceroy Mubariz-ul-Mulk (1723- 1730) of Jhalori family of Palanpur.

During the eighteenth century, besides the parts made over to the Babi family, much of the Tervada estate was filched away from the weakened head of the house by his Koli Thakor and other neighbours. Of the former 104 Tervada villages only sixteen remain by nineteenth century. These were, in 1822, confirmed to Baloch Khan as the Nawab of Radhanpur failed to disprove his claim. He was succeeded by Thakor Nathu Khan.

Tervada entered into agreements with the British Government in 1820s. It was under Palanpur Agency of Bombay Presidency, which in 1925 became the Banas Kantha Agency. After Independence of India in 1947, Bombay Presidency was reorganized in Bombay State. When Gujarat state was formed in 1960 from Bombay State, it fell under Banaskantha district of Gujarat.
