= Deodar =

Deodar may refer to:

== Places in Gujarat, India ==
- Diyodar or Deodar or Diodar, a town in Gujarat, India
- Deodar State, a former princely state in Banas Kantha, with the above town as capital
- Deodar (Vidhan Sabha constituency), with seat in the above town, located in there above taluka of Banaskantha District

== Other uses ==
- Cedrus deodara, tree species from India known for Christmas-tree shape
- Deodar forests, where the above cedar abounds, in Western Himalayas from Gandak river in central Nepal to the Hindukush range in Afghanistan
