= Charup =

- Village
- Location in Gujarat, India Charup (India)
- Coordinates: 23.940408°N 72.126328°E
- Country: India
- State: Gujarat
- District: Patan

Languages
  - Official: Gujarati, Hindi
- Time zone: UTC+5:30 (IST)
- PIN: 384285
- Vehicle registration: GJ-

Charup is a village in Saraswati Taluka of Patan district of Gujarat state of India.

== History ==
During Chaulukya rule, Charup was a large town populated predominantly by Jains. There is a large Jain temple dedicated to Parshwanath making it the place of pilgrimage among Jains. The chief deity is mentioned in the Prabhachandracharya's Prabhavak Charit dated Samvat 1334 (1278 CE). The temple was renovated in 1882 CE and a rest house was opened in 1900 CE.
