= Kakar, Banaskantha =

Coordinates: 20°40′N 75°59′E

Kakar is a village in Kankrej Taluka of Banaskantha district in Gujarat, India.

== History ==
Kakar was the ancient capital of Kankrej region. It is said that the town was known as Kankavati. It was under Palanpur Agency of Bombay Presidency, which in 1925 became the Banas Kantha Agency. After Independence of India in 1947, Bombay Presidency was reorganized in Bombay State. When Gujarat state was formed in 1960 from Bombay State, it fell under Banaskantha district of Gujarat.

== Places of interest ==
The village has a Jain temple whose few remaining marble carvings are said to show traces of Greek art. Where entire temples are found, the architecture corresponds with the Chalukya and Jain styles. The relief carving is peculiarly spirited and equals the art remains at Sidhpur, Patan and Modhera. The male and female figures have a peculiar head dress and the men have generally boots curiously like what are called Hessians.
