= Patan Assembly constituency =

Patan Assembly constituency may refer to:

- Patan, Chhattisgarh Assembly constituency
- Patan, Gujarat Assembly constituency
- Patan, Madhya Pradesh Assembly constituency
- Patan, Maharashtra Assembly constituency

== See also ==
- Pattan Assembly constituency, Jammu and Kashmir
