= Jordiyali =

Jordiyali is a small but well developed village of Vav taluka of Banaskantha district in Gujarat. It is located at the left bank of Luni river. In this village, there is a temple of Nag devta which was built by Jorji Darbar the king of Jordiyali village.
