= Manund =

- village
- Location in Gujarat, India Manund (India)
- Coordinates: 23.7352°N 72.2627°E
- Country: India
- State: Gujarat
- District: Patan
- Talukas: Patan

Population
  - Total: 4,000

Languages
  - Official: Gujarati, Hindi
- Time zone: UTC+5:30 (IST)
- PIN: 384260
- Vehicle registration: GJ
- Website: gujaratindia.com

Manund is a village in the Patan district of Gujarat, India.

Manund is divided into two main parts: Ugamani Pati and Athamani Pati. Athamani Pati is further subdivided into Khapaitu and Mukhya Athamani Pati. There are several temples, schools, and colleges in the village.

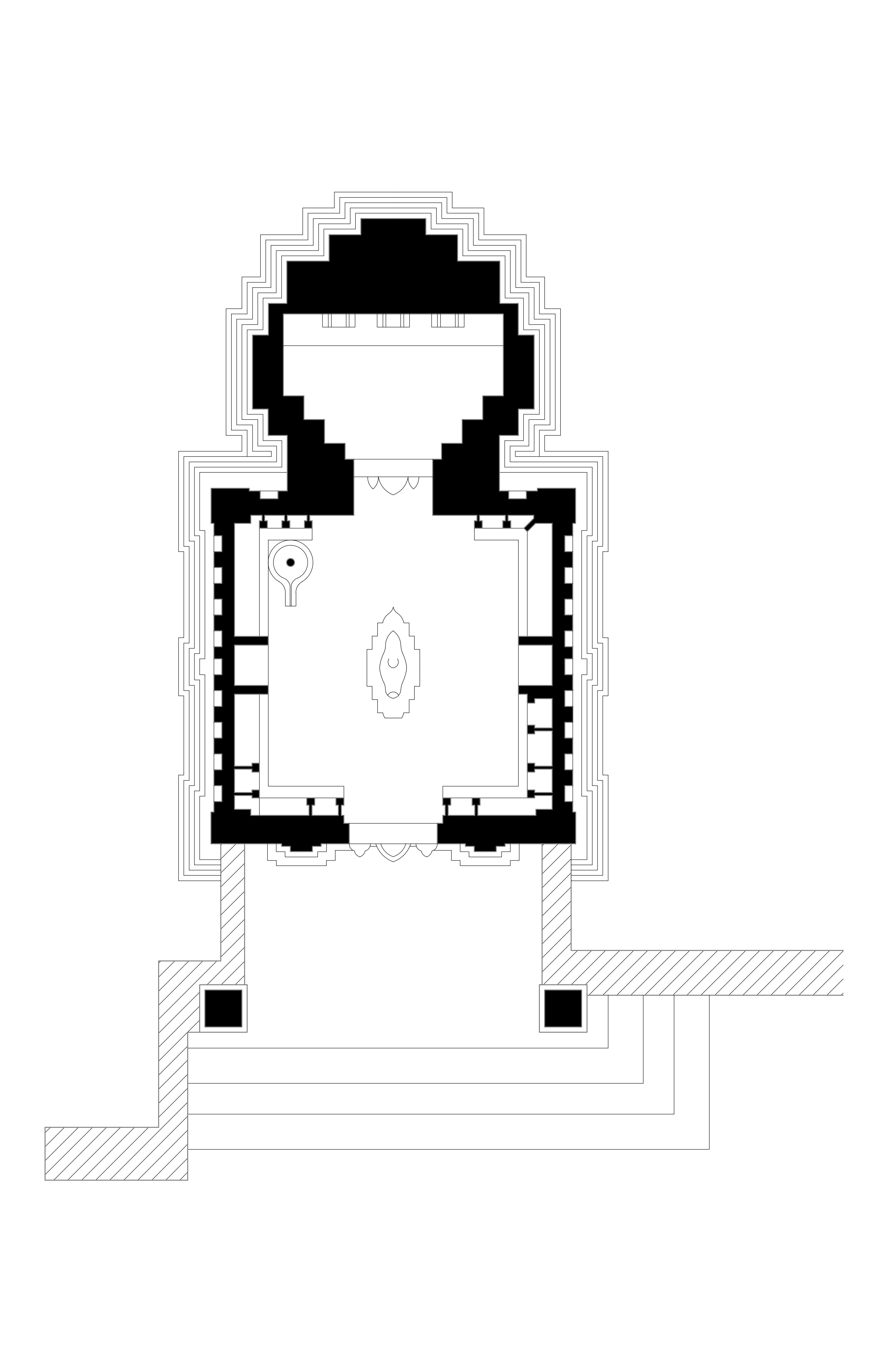
Floor plan of the historic Narayan temple in Manund

Shri B.K. Amin High School is the oldest high school in the district. Until twenty years ago, this school was the center of studies for nearby villages like Sander, Palasar, Kantharavi, and Vasaipura. Manund also contains a post office, a Bank of India, a Mehsana Nagarik Sahkari bank, and the Credit Bank of Manund. It is connected to surrounding villages both by road and by train.

The village has a school built in Gaekwad era.
