= Bajana, Surendranagar district =

Village in Gujarat state, India

Bajana is a village and a former princely state of Muslim Jats and Jhala Rajput rulers of Jhalawar. Presently it is in taluka of Surendranagar district, Gujarat, India.

== Location ==
Bajana is situated on the southern shore of the Little Rann of Kutch near its south-east corner. It lies in north latitude 23° 6' and east longitude 71° 49'.

== History ==
The rulers of Bajana State were Muslim Jats, originally came from Vānga Bāzār in Sindh. They are said to have come in 711 with the army of Muhammad Qasim. It is said that one of the ruler of Sindh asked Malik Umar Khan to get his daughter married to him, but he refused, upon their refusal they were forced to leave and fled to Dadhana state, and then into Kutch state, Rao Raydhan the then ruler of Kutch refused them shelter, so they moved to take shelter in the Muli state of Panwars/Parmars in the Mandav hills near Thān. Muslik-Mahmud I Begadha, Sultan of Gujarat, employed the Jats in the siege of Champaner (Chhota Udepur) in 1484, and granted the state of Bajana with 24 villages to their leader Malik Hadoji. The Jat malek concurred mandal from jhalas. They were allowed to retain several of its villages, although Mandal itself was taken by the Sultan. When the Sardar of Bajana incurred the displeasure of the Mughal viceroy of Gujarat, the latter resumed the grant of the Estate and ordered it partitioned among Rajput Maleks. Bajana was assigned to Malik Haidar Khan, Valivada to malek isaji. Malik Isaji later conquered Warahi. Warahi was known as greater jatvad and Bajana as the Junior. While Malik Lakha settled in Sitapur and Vanod and malek haidarkhanji settled in Bajana.

From 1921 to 1947 the ruler was entitled to elect a representative member of the Chamber of Princes. In 1948 his Privy Purse was set at Rs 65,500 a year.

At the time of merger, the area of the State was 183 square miles, and the population (1941) 13,996. From 1943 to 1947 Bajana was attached to Baroda. Bajana is now in Surendranagar District.
