= Kiritkumar Patel =

Indian politician

Member of the Gujarat Legislative Assembly
- Incumbent
- Assumed office 2017
- Preceded by: Ranchhodbhai Mahijibhai Desai
- Constituency: Patan

Personal details
- Born: 1969 (age 55–56); Patan, Gujarat
- Political party: Indian National Congress
- Education: PhD (Hemchandracharya North Gujarat University)

Kiritkumar Chimanlal Patel (born 1969) is an Indian politician from Gujarat. He is a member of the Gujarat Legislative Assembly from Patan Assembly constituency in Patan district. He won the 2022 Gujarat Legislative Assembly election representing the Indian National Congress.

== Early life and education ==
Patel is from Patan, Gujarat. He is the son of Patel Chimanlal Vitthaldas. He completed his Ph.D. in 2010 at Hemchandracharya North Gujarat University. He is a professor and his wife is a private teacher.

== Career ==
Patel won from Patan Assembly constituency representing the Indian National Congress in the 2022 Gujarat Legislative Assembly election. He polled 103,505 votes and defeated his nearest rival, Rajulben Desai of the Bharatiya Janata Party, by a margin of 17,177 votes. He became an MLA for the first time winning the 2017 Gujarat Legislative Assembly election defeating Desai Ranchhodbhai Mahijibhai of the Bharatiya Janata Party, by a margin of 25,279 votes.
