= Dhima =

Coordinates: 24.4568871°N 71.5178708°E

Dhima is a capital city of Dharnidhar taluka in Vav-Tharad District in Gujarat, India.

== History ==
Dhima was lapsed to Vav State in 1870. It was under Palanpur Agency of Bombay Presidency, which in 1925 became the Banas Kantha Agency. After Independence of India in 1947, Bombay Presidency was reorganized in Bombay State. When Gujarat state was formed in 1960 from Bombay State, it fell under tharad Taluka of Banaskantha district of Gujarat.

== Place of interest ==
Dharnidhar temple is a chief place of worship for Hindus of the region since British period. The temple is dedicated to DharniDhar (Lord Vishnu's silence form of Varah Avatar) and Dheman Nag, the earth-supporting snake in Hinduism.
