= Patan, Gujarat Assembly constituency =

Legislative Assembly constituency in Gujarat State, India

Coordinates: 23.85°N 72.12°E

Patan
- Constituency No. 18 for the Gujarat Legislative Assembly

Constituency details
- Country: India
- Region: Western India
- State: Gujarat
- District: Patan
- Lok Sabha constituency: Patan
- Established: 1972
- Total electors: 306,328
- Reservation: None

Member of Legislative Assembly
- 15th Gujarat Legislative Assembly
- Incumbent Kiritkumar Chimanlal Patel
- Party: Indian National Congress
- Elected year: 2022

Patan is one of the 182 Legislative Assembly constituencies of Gujarat state in India. It is part of Patan district and a segment of Patan Lok Sabha constituency. It is numbered as 18-Patan.

== List of segments ==
This assembly seat represents the following segments,

Patan Taluka (Part) Villages – Melusan, Golivada, Volavi, Jamtha, Kansa, Bhutiya Vasna, Deliyathara, Vayad, Ghacheli, Dharusan, Dhanasara, Rakhav, Kalodhi, Vadiya, Lodhi, Sotavad, Sampra, Undra, Sariyad, Veloda (Nana-Mota), Nayta, Balva, Vaghasar, Bepadar, Khanpurda, Vareda, Odhva, Khalipur, Rughnathpura, Nava Bavahaji, Sujnipur, Tankvasna, Aghar, Gulvasna, Lodhpur, Kuntavada, Ajimana, Sagodiya, Jaleshvar Paldi, Samalpati, Matarvadi, Anavada, Hanumanpura, Dudharampura, Dharnoj, Bhadrada, Fulesana, Badipur, Vadli, Bakratpur, Gungdipati, Hansapur, Runi, Hajipur, Kamlivada, Diodarda, Der, Chadasana, Nana Ramanda, Mota Ramanda, Santi, Dharpur, Dighdi, Ambliyasan, Khanpur Kodi, Mandotri, Borsan, Golapur, Sandesarpati, Kharivavdi, Manpur, Khanpur Rajkuva, Chandrumana, Bhalgam, Kungher, Ilampur, Sabosan, Katpur, Rajpur, Gadosan, Gaja, Norta, Sarva, Kuder, Balisana, Derasana, Kani, Visal-Vasna, Babasana, Samoda, Hamidpur, Mahemadpur, Mithivavdi, Khimiyana, Sankhari, Sardarpur Norta (Ambapara), Ranunj, Sander, Matpur, Ruvavi, Dabhdi, Manund, Patan (M).

== Members of Vidhan Sabha ==
Year	Member	Picture	Party
1972	Nathabhai Desai		Indian National Congress
1975	Bhagwandas Amin		Bharatiya Jana Sangh
2007	Anandiben Patel		Bharatiya Janata Party
2012	Ranchhodbhai Mahijibhai Desai		Bharatiya Janata Party
2017	Kiritkumar Chimanlal Patel		Indian National Congress
2022	Kiritkumar Chimanlal Patel		Indian National Congress

== Election results ==
=== 2022 ===
Gujarat Assembly election, 2022: Patan, Gujarat Assembly constituency
Party	Candidate	Votes	%	±%
INC	Kiritkumar Patel	103,505	50.16	
BJP	Dr. Rajulben Desai	86328	41.84	
AAP	Lalesh Thakkar	6808	3.3	
NOTA	None of the above	2481	1.2	
Majority			8.32	
Turnout				
Registered electors		306,493		
INC hold		Swing		

=== 2017 ===
Gujarat Legislative Assembly Election, 2017: Patan
Party	Candidate	Votes	%	±%
INC	Kiritkumar Patel	103,273	54.10%	
BJP	Ranchhodbhai Mahijibhai Desai	77994	40.86	
Majority				
Registered electors		272,074		
Turnout				

=== 2012 ===
Gujarat Assembly Election, 2012
Party	Candidate	Votes	%	±%
BJP	Ranchhodbhai Mahijibhai Desai	67224	41.00	
INC	Jodhaji Thakor	61353	37.42	
Majority		5871	3.58	
Turnout		163948	70.62	
BJP hold		Swing		

=== 1975 Vidhan Sabha Elections ===
- Amin, Bhagwandas Narandas (BJS) : 24,240 votes
- Patel Bhudarbhai Chhganbhai (INC) : 17,096

== See also ==
- List of constituencies of the Gujarat Legislative Assembly
- Patan district
