= Nikol =

Nikol is a given name and a surname. Notable people with the name include:

== Given name ==
- Nikol Aghbalian (1875– 1947), Armenian public figure and historian of literature
- Nikol Bulat (born 1987), Croatian singer
- Nikol Ġużeppi Cauchi (1929–2010), Maltese Roman Catholic bishop
- Nikol Duman (1867–1914), Armenian revolutionary
- Nikol Faridani (1936–2008), Iranian Armenian photographer
- Gery-Nikol (born 1998), Bulgarian recording artist
- Nikol Gosviani (born 1996), Russian figure skater
- Nikol Hasler (born 1979), American internet content creator
- Nikol Kaletka (born 1995), Polish footballer
- Nikol Krasiuk (born 2004), Ukrainian rhythmic gymnast
- Nikol Kučerová (born 1989), Czech freestyle skier
- Nikol Merizaj (born 1998), Albanian swimmer
- Nikol Pashinyan (born 1975), Armenian politician and current Armenian Prime Minister
- Nikol Płosaj (born 1996), Polish cyclist
- Nikol Reznikov (born 1999), Israeli model
- Nikol Rodomakina (born 1993), Russian Paralympic athlete
- Nikol Sajdová (born 1988), Czech female volleyball player
- Nikol Todorova (born 2008), Bulgarian rhythmic gymnast

== Surname ==
- Jenna Nikol, alias of the American model Kayden Kross
- Ronny Nikol, German football player
