= Santalpur =

City in Gujarat, India

- town
- Location in Gujarat, India Santalpur (India)
- Coordinates: 23°45′47″N 71°10′09″E
- Country: India
- State: Gujarat
- District: Patan

Languages
  - Official: Gujarati
- Time zone: UTC+5:30 (IST)
- Vehicle registration: GJ-24

Santalpur is a village in Santalpur Taluka of Patan district of Gujarat state, India.

== History ==
The proprietors of Santalpur and Chadchat were Jadeja Rajputs. According to the local history, before the Jadejas came Santalpur was held by Turks, probably a colony from Sindh. After them came the Jhalas, one of whom founded and gave his name to the village of Santalpur. Santal Jhala married a sister of Lunaji Vaghela, the conqueror of Gidi and Radhanpur, but, offending Lunaji, was attacked by him and slain. Santalpur did not long continue under Vaghela rule. Sarkhaji the son of Lunaji was driven out by Rao Khengarji I of Cutch State who took both Santalpur and Chadchat.

Santalpur was under Palanpur Agency of Bombay Presidency, which in 1925 became the Banas Kantha Agency. After Independence of India in 1947, Bombay Presidency was reorganized in Bombay State. When Gujarat state was formed in 1960 from Bombay State, it fell under Mehsana district of Gujarat. Later it became part of Patan district.
