= Sami, Gujarat =

Sami
- town
- Location in Gujarat, India Sami (India)
- Coordinates: 23.687176°N 71.778619°E
- Country: India
- State: Gujarat
- District: Patan

Government
  - Type: Panchayat

Population (2011)
  - Total: 12,591

Languages
  - Official: Gujarati, Hindi
- Time zone: UTC+5:30 (IST)
- Postal code: 384245
- Vehicle registration: GJ24
- Website: gujaratindia.com

Sami is a town in Sami Taluka of Patan district of Gujarat, India.

== History ==
According to the tradition Sami takes its name from its founder, an ascetic of Atit or Sami order. It came under the power of the Nawab of Radhanpur around 1753; and at the beginning of the nineteenth century was his capital and headquarters. The great plague of 1816 carried off about one-half of its population.

Sami was under Radhanpur state. Radhanpur was under Palanpur Agency of Bombay Presidency, which in 1925 became the Banas Kantha Agency. After Independence of India in 1947, Bombay Presidency was reorganized in Bombay State. When Gujarat state was formed in 1960 from Bombay State, it fell under Mehsana district of Gujarat and subsequently became part of Patan district.

== Places of interest ==
There is a temple of "Shree Kshetrapal Dada", deity (Kul Devta) of Lohana community.

Sami was surrounded by a brick wall about one and a half miles in circumference, twenty-four feet high and twelve wide, now partly in ruins. To the east is a strong stone and brick court, and on the west a building of Nuransha Pir with a lake called the Pir Talav. Besides these, there is a mosque and the tombs of some of the Nawabs' families.

== Transportation ==
=== Road ===
Auto rickshaws are used to move within the town & nearby villages. Sami is about 145 km from Ahmedabad, connected to GJ SH 18 & GJ SH 55. Sami is well connected by GSRTC as-well-as private luxury buses connecting major cities, towns & villages in Gujarat, there is a GSRTC bus stand in the town as well.

=== Rail ===
The nearest railway stations are Viramgam railway station, Radhanpur & Mahesana railway station, these connect to all major cities and towns in India.

=== Air ===
The nearest airports are Sardar Vallabhbhai Patel International Airport & Mehsana Airport.

== Banking ==
Sami is currently served by Baroda Gujarat Gramin Bank & State Bank of India. Axis Bank has set up an ATM.
