= Tharad =

- Urban Town
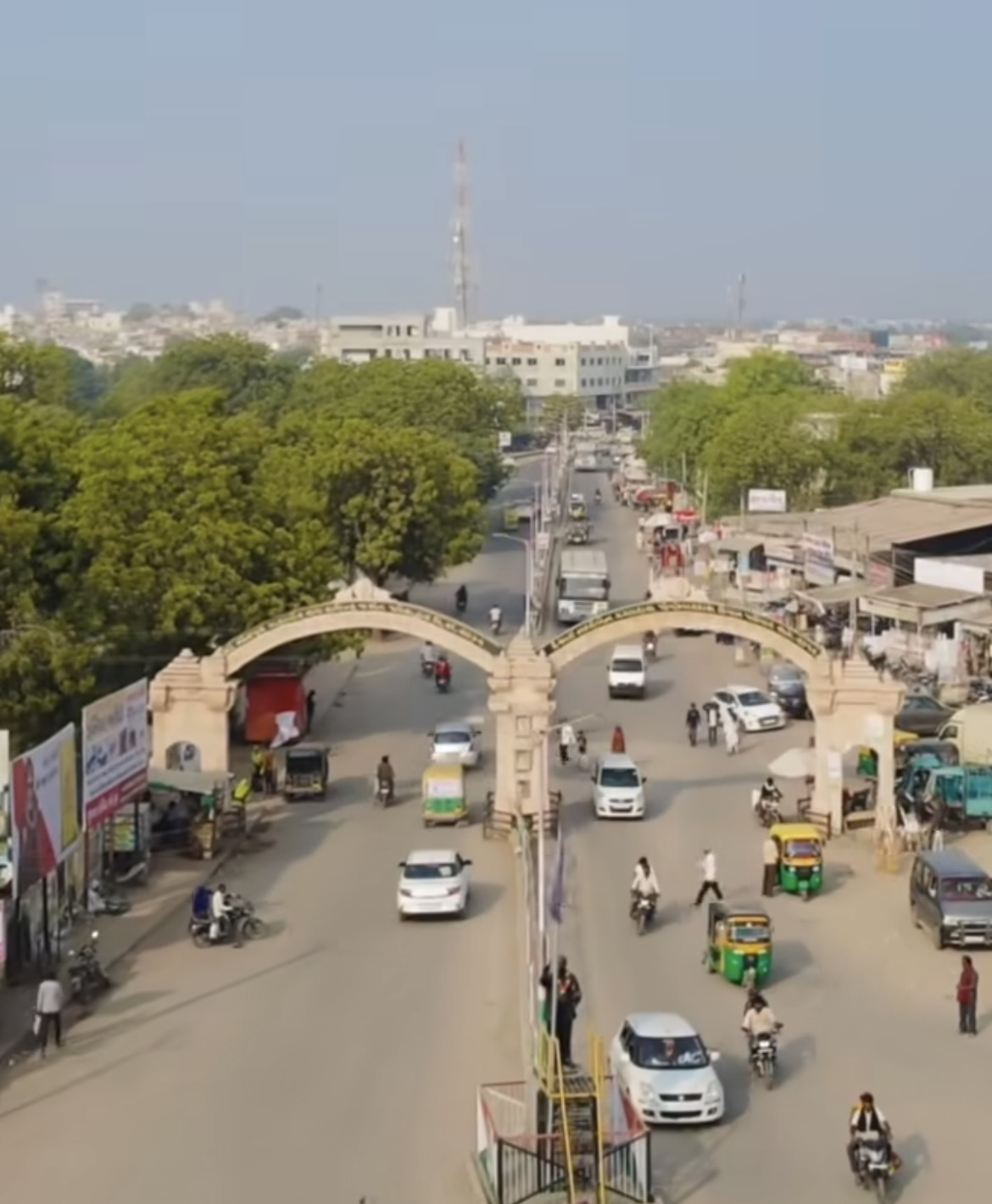
- Nickname: Thirpur Nagri
- Interactive map of Tharad
- Coordinates: 24.392563°N 71.62484°E
- Country: India
- State: Gujarat
- District: Vav-Tharad district

Government
  - Body: Nagar Palika

Area
  - Total: 14.74 km^{2} (5.69 sq mi)
- Elevation: 10 m (33 ft)

Population (2024)
  - Total: 39,000
  - Density: 2,600/km^{2} (6,900/sq mi)

Languages
  - Official: Gujarati, Hindi
- Time zone: UTC+5:30 (IST)
- PIN: 385565
- Telephone code: 02737
- Vehicle registration: GJ-40
- Website: gujaratindia.com

Tharad (historically known as Thirpur) is a administrative center of the Vav-Tharad district. The district consists of 134 villages. Tharad is 45kms from international border with Pakistan and 40kms from the state border with the Rajasthan state. Main industries are agriculture and private businesses. It is one of the first major towns in Gujarat on National Highway 68.

== History ==
The verse, dohra, about the founding of Tharad, states that in 115 (S. 171) Tharpar Parmar, leaving Shripur or Bhinmal in Marwad, went to the west and established the city of Tharad. The town continued in the hands of the Parmars till the tenth century, when it was taken by Chaulukya king Mularaja (r. c. 940 – c. 995– ).

Tharad is said to have originally belonged to Parmar Rajputs, and many Parmars of the Suvar and Kalma clans were found in subordinate positions in the Tharad villages during British period.

According to a Jain account, the last of the Parmar line became a convert to the Jainism, and resigned his chiefdom to his sister's son, the Chauhan Saregogji Ratansingji of Nadol, an ancestor of the Rana of Vav, in 1275 (Samvat 1331). Others say that the Chauhan killed his maternal uncle and usurped the chiefdom. The Chauhans, with the title of Rana, ruled at Tharad for about six generations, till, in the reign of Rana Punjaji, they were attacked by the Muslims, their capital stormed, and their chief slain. Another account says that the Chauhan Rajputs were driven out by the Rathods of Jodhpur, who were succeeded by the Muslims in fifteenth century.

Henceforward Tharad was held by Muslim rulers and for several generations a family with the patronymic Multani ruled as proprietors, Jagirdars, and commandants, Thandars. As civil administrators of an isolated crown holding, they were invested with the title of Diwan which was continued during British period.

This Muslim conquest probably took place in the reign, either of Muhammad Shahab-ud-din Ghori (1174-1206) or of Kutbud-din Aibak (1206-1210). In the later monarch's reign, the change of capital from Lahore to Delhi, and his numerous wars, made the Multani family's position very difficult. That they were able to hold their own was due to the aid of a family of Naiks, had become converts to Islam. In return for their services, the Naik family received the grant of several villages which they held till British period. At this time the smaller estates were chiefly in the hands of vassals of the Gohil and Parmar clans. Kubhara and Ledan were held by Chauhans; Duva, Roha, and Tithgam by the Bhildia Vaghelas of Bhildigad; Eta Village and other villages by the descendants of Chibhadiya Brahmins who held them from the Rathods of Kanauj, and the rest by owners of whom scarce a trace remains.

After the Muslim conquest of Tharad, the wife of Rana Punjaji, a Sodhi by caste, fled with her infant son to her father's house at Parkar. On growing up, her son Vajoji, returning to Tharad in 1244 built a stepwell, vav, and, successfully beating off the attacks of the Multanis, took the title of Rana, and, after his well, called his town Vav. His descendants rule there till British period. Compared with that of the Multani family, the cause of the Vav Rana was popular, and though for fear of drawing on themselves the army of the Patan governor, they dared not attempt to win back Tharad, they slowly spread their rule over many of the smaller holdings, and built up a fairly powerful chiefdom. Their cadets gradually won back many of the Tharad holdings, turning out the Gohil Suvar and Kalma Rajputs, but continuing to hold their estates from Tharad whose ruler they probably propitiated with gifts, nazaranas. In this way most of the smaller Tharad fiefs fell into the hands of Nadola Chauhans, cadets of the Vav house or of the old Ranas of Tharad by whom they are still held.

On the rise of the Gujarat Sultanate (1403), the Multani family became their vassals. Later on Fateh Khan Baloch, one of the chief Gujarat nobles, held Tervada and Radhanpur, ousting the Multani family who sank into obscurity, and hold only the Tharad village of Kothigam by the end of British period.

When, about 1700, the Jhalori family were driven from Jhalor and settled at Palanpur, Firoz Khan Jhalori obtained the chief power at Tharad. This lasted only a short time. About 1730, Tharad was given to Jawan Mard Khan Babi of Radhanpur State. Very soon after, when Abhaysinh of Jodhpur (1730 - 1737) was Viceroy, the Babi was turned out, and in his place a deputy was stationed at Tharad.

The next ruler of Tharad was Chauhan Jetmalji, a cadet of the Vav house, who established himself there in 1736. In the following year, Rana Vajrajji, the head of the Vav house, fearing that Jetmalji might prove a dangerous rival, invited Bahadur Khan of Palanpur to oust him. Bahadur Khan agreed, and, driving out Jetmalji, kept the chiefship in his own hands. Within a few years (about 1740), the district was given either as an estate, jaghirdari, or as a charge, faujdari, to Nawab Kamal-ud-din Khan, till, in 1759, he handed it over to Vaghela Kanji, chief of Morvada, one of the supporters of the Babi family. This Kanji belonged to the Sardhara branch of the Vaghela tribe who took their name from the conquest of Sardhargadh in Saurashtra. This fortress, conquered by Vaghela Muluji from Churasam Bhim, was held by the Vaghelas for three generations. Then Vaghela Lunaji was expelled by Vibhojt, the head of the Jadeja house of Rajkot. Lunaji conquered Radhanpur, Varihi, Khorda, Santalpur, and Gidi in Kutch. In 1479 (Samvat 1535) one of his descendants, Rana Visal Dev, conquered Morvada, slaying its Chavod chief Magaji, and since then Kanji's forefathers have held Morvada.

Kanji, before his death (1786), succeeded in making himself independent of his former patron. He was succeeded by his brother Harbhamji. About this time (1819), Tharad being much harassed and almost unpeopled by the raids of Khosas and other desert plunderers, the chief Harbhamji approached the British. In 1820, after the Khosas bad been driven out, the chief entered into an agreement with the British and Gaekwad on 14 February 1821 and became protectorate. In 1823 Harbhamji died and was succeeded by Karansing. In 1859 Karansing died and was succeeded by Khengarsing. Khengarsig died in 1892 and was succeeded by Abhaising who died in 1910. His successor Daulatsinh ruled from 1910 to 1921 when he died. Bimsinhji succeeded him and ruled until independence of India in 1947.

Tharad was under Palanpur Agency of Bombay Presidency, which in 1925 became the Banas Kantha Agency and ruled by Vaghela chieftains. After Independence of India in 1947, Bombay Presidency was reorganized in Bombay State. When Gujarat state was formed in 1960 from Bombay State, it fell under Banaskantha district of Gujarat.

== Places of interest ==
=== Nandevi Temple ===
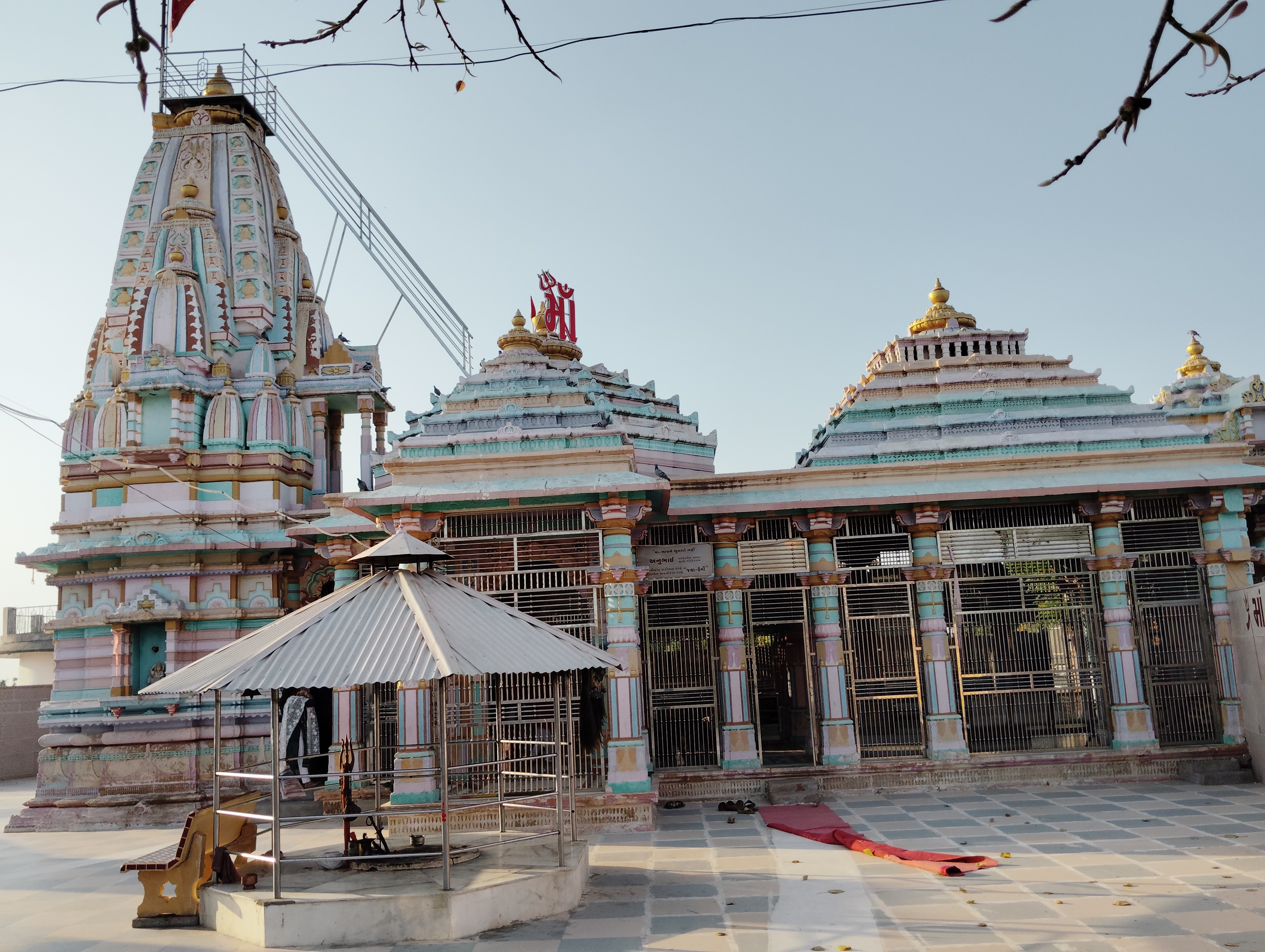
Nandevi (Ashapura Mataji) Temple

Outside the town, there is an old Hindu temple with an illegible inscription cut in stone. According to the local story, about 700 years ago before Chauhan Ratansing was driven out of Nadol, his family goddess Ashapura commanded him to leave Nadol, and, going westward, to settle in a place where the rope of his wagon should break. Starting off, the rope broke near Tharad. Here he stopped, and, in time, subduing the country round built a temple, calling it in honour of his goddess Nan Devi. The original shrine was probably built in 12th century by Ratansing. There is a small stepwell nearby.

=== Jain centres ===
Tharad is an ancient Jain Pilgrimage centre hosting several Jain temples, viz., Shri Jamkaar Devi Mataji Temple, Shree Mota Mahaveer / Adinath Sw. Jain Temple, Kanku Chiman Vihar Dham, Sakal tirth derasar, Jayantsen suri guru mandir, and more.

== Health and education ==
Tharad has seven government-run primary schools, and three high schools namely Rajeshwar Adarsha Vidyalaya, Janta High School and Gayatri Vidyalaya, Tharad. It also has an Arts, Commerce, and Science colleges run by the Shri Anjna Patel Kelvani Trust. In 2009, the government established a government arts and commerce college. The town has many public and privately run hospitals like J.J. hospital, Dharati hospital, including a large referral hospital and a public health centercenter. Also private school like M.S.vidhyamandir, Dharnidhar reading library, & many more private institutes.

== Transportation ==
Tharad is also a transportation center, with over 300 buses linking the town with various parts of Gujarat and Rajasthan. You can get direct bus connectivity from all major centres in Gujarat.

== Economy ==
Economy largely depends on agriculture and trade. The Central Agriculture Market Yard represents the economic center of the town where farmers can auction their products. There are many dairy cooperatives, and a cold storage is located nearby. Tharad also has a major jewellery market.

== Notable people ==
Gautam Adani - owner of Adani Group, his ancestors was from this town.

Parbatbhai Patel - former MP

Shankar Chaudhary - MLA Tharad
