= Harij =

- city
- Location in Gujarat, India Harij (India)
- Coordinates: 23.7°N 71.9°E
- Country: India
- State: Gujarat
- District: Patan

Government
  - Type: BJP, Bhartiy Janta Party (2022)
- Elevation: 33 m (108 ft)

Population (2024)
  - Total: 28,988

Languages
  - Official: Gujarati, Hindi
- Time zone: UTC+5:30 (IST)
- Vehicle registration: GJ - 24
- Website: gujaratindia.com

Harij is a city and a municipality in Patan district in the Indian state of Gujarat.

== Geography ==
Harij is located at 23.7°N 71.9°E. It has an average elevation of 33 metres (108 feet).

== Demographics ==
As of 2001 India census, Harij had a population of 18,388. Males constitute 53% of the population and females 47%. Harij has an average literacy rate of 57%, lower than the national average of 59.5%: male literacy is 65%, and female literacy is 47%. In Harij, 15% of the population is under 6 years of age.
