= Chanasma =

- Town
- Location in Gujarat, India Chanasma (India)
- Coordinates: 23.72°N 72.12°E
- Country: India
- State: Gujarat
- District: Patan
- Founder: Sri Lalji Das Laxmi Das Patel

Government
  - Type: Municipality

Area
  - Total: 4 km^{2} (1.5 sq mi)
- Elevation: 61 m (200 ft)

Population (2018)
  - Total: 25,000
  - Density: 6,300/km^{2} (16,000/sq mi)

Languages
  - Official: Gujarati, Hindi
- Time zone: UTC+5:30 (IST)
- PIN: 384220
- Vehicle registration: GJ 24

Chanasma is a small town and a municipality in Chanasma Taluka of Patan district in the state of Gujarat, India. Chanasma is a seat of Gujarat Assembly. The MP seat of Chanasma falls in the Patan Lok Sabha. Chanasma village is connected by Kandla-Mehsana highway. And since the broad gauge of the railway is being renovated, it is going to connect with Rajasthan via Patan from Ahmedabad. Patel, Brahmin, Vania, Darji, Panchal, Parmar, Rabari, Thakor, Nayi, all communities live in Chansma village. The old village of Chanasma was between Ugmano Darwaza and Athamano Darwaza. But now due to the increase in population and development of the village, the village is spreading to the outside. Chansma Village Shree Laljidas Laxmidas Patel Trust runs Rotla Ghar for feeding the poor where clean and nutritious meals are provided to the poor for free.

A Jain people's trust runs a PanjraPole where sick animals are kept and cared for. Chansma village 25 years ago was very famous for iron goods like lock and key and iron cupboard. But now, due to the decrease in the iron industry, the people of Chanasma village have to go to cities like Surat, Ahmedabad, Ankleshwar, Vapi, Mumbai for employment.

== Geography ==
Chanasma is located at 23.72°N 72.12°E. It has an average elevation of 61 metres (200 feet).

== Demographics ==
At the 2001 India census, Chanasma had a population of 15,819. Males constituted 52% of the population and females 48%. Chanasma had an average literacy rate of 74%, higher than the national average of 59.5%; with male literacy of 81% and female literacy of 67%. 10% of the population was under 6 years of age.

== Places of interest ==
The Bhateva Parshwanath Jain temple was built in first half of 19th century at the cost of ₹7 lakh (equivalent to ₹15 crore or US$1.6 million in 2023). The temple is built with stone and has profusely carved images and figures including that of 24 Tirthankaras. The image of chief deity is made of sand and cow-dung. The floor is covered with marble.

There are temples of Ramji Mandir, Pimpaleshwar Mahadev, Nilkanth Mahadev and Verai Mata. A dargah of Navagaja Pir is located near the town.

== Education ==
Chansma village has the following institutions from Government and Private Gujarati and English Medium Junior to College.

- Kumar School No.1
- Kumar School No.2
- Girl (Kanya)School
- PP Patel High School
- Girls High School
- Om Public English School
- St. Mary's English School
- Arts and Commerce College
- ITI
- Shishu Bal Mandir
- Poonam Chand Bal Mandir

== Amenities ==
Public Institutions in Chanasma Village include Post Office, Agricultural Market Yard, Court, Mamlatdar Office, Municipality, Government Dispensary, Government Veterinary Dispensary, Civil Hospital, GIDC, Various Government and Private Banks like Commercial Bank of Chansma, Chanasma Nagrik Bank, Dena Bank, State Bank of India, Bank of India, Bank of Baroda, Mehsana District Bank, Mehsana Urban Bank, Baroda Gramin Bank, etc.
