= Morvada =

Village in Gujarat state, India

Coordinates: 24.0255177°N 71.367378°E

Morvada is a village in Vav Taluka of Banaskantha district in Gujarat, India.

== History ==
Morwada was formerly a Turkic state and was conquered by the Chavod Rajputs from the Turks. The Chavod Rajputs are said to have been conquered from them by the Vaghela Rajputs, who were driven out by Visaldeva, a descendant of Lunaji Vaghela of Tharad, in (1535). There is a Jain temple in the village. The idols are said to be about 2200 years old (according to Maharaj). It was ruled by the Vaghela family of Tharad, a descendant of Visaldeva, until India's independence.

Morvada entered into agreements with the British Government in 1820s. It was under Palanpur Agency of Bombay Presidency, which in 1925 became the Banas Kantha Agency. After Independence of India in 1947, Bombay Presidency was reorganized in Bombay State. When Gujarat state was formed in 1960 from Bombay State, it fell under Banaskantha district of Gujarat. Morvada falls on Radhanpur - Suigam state highway.
