= Kankrej thana =

Defunct polities, Banaskantha district

Coordinates: 24.0391008°N 71.9414377°E

Kankrej thana or Kankrej Estates was a former collection of native states in what is now part of Banaskantha district of Gujarat, India.

== History ==
The thana was divided between 34 talukdars, or petty estate holders belong to Koli caste. The most important of these were Thara, Khamboi and Un. Most of the estates were small, often covering not even a single village, but parts of several villages shared with others. There were numerous bhayats (land alienated to junior branches) of these petty chiefs, but the lands were not actually surveyed and divided; they simply occupied as much as land as they could cultivate. Primogeniture was not observed in any of the estates of Kankrej Thana; rather, giras were divided up in equal shares among all sons.

Kankrej chiefs agreed with British in 1819–20 to become protectorate and came under Mahi Kantha Agency. It continued part of the Mahi Kantha till, in 1844, on account of its nearness to Palanpur, it was transferred to the Palanpur Superintendency.

Kankrej was under Palanpur Agency of Bombay Presidency, which in 1925 became the Banas Kantha Agency. After Independence of India in 1947, Bombay Presidency was reorganized in Bombay State. When Gujarat state was formed in 1960 from Bombay State, it fell under Banaskantha district of Gujarat.
