= Vav, Gujarat =

Town in Gujarat state, India

Vav
- Town
- Interactive map of Vav
- Coordinates: 24.3614984°N 71.5092326°E
- Country: India
- State: Gujarat
- District: Vav-Tharad district

Government
  - Body: Nagar Panchayat

Languages
  - Official: Gujarati, Hindi
- Time zone: UTC+5:30 (IST)
- PIN: 388575
- Vehicle registration: GJ-40
- Website: gujaratindia.com

Vav is a town and the headquarters of Vav Taluka in Vav - Tharad District in Gujarat state of India. Vav is the largest taluka of the district.

== History ==
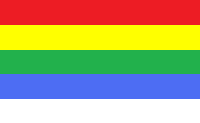
Flag of Vav

The Rana, rulers of Vav, came from Sambhar and Nadol in Rajasthan, and claimed kindred with Prithviraj Chauhan, who was defeated and slain by the Afghans in 1193. After many turns of fortune, Dedhrav, driven out of Nandol, settled at Tharad, then under the Chaulukya kings of Anhilwad Patan kings. According to other views, his son Rana Ratansing, driven out of Nadol, in 1103, settled at Tharad. Rana Punja, the seventh in descent from Dedhrav was killed by the Muslims in battle in 1283. His son Rana Vaja regained his estate, by the influence of his father-in-law the Raval of Jaisalmer, as a grant from the Delhi emperor but lost Tharad. So he chose his new capital, Vav. Vav gained its name from a step-well built by his great-grandfather Rana Mehpalji. It suffered very severely from the 1813 famine. During the British period, the eighteenth descendant, Umedsinh, agreed with the British in 1819-20 and became a protectorate.

Vav State was under the Palanpur Agency of Bombay Presidency, which in 1925 became the Banas Kantha Agency. After Independence of India in 1947, the Bombay Presidency was reorganized in Bombay State. When Gujarat state was formed in 1960 from Bombay State, it fell under Banaskantha district of Gujarat till January 2025, After the Newly Vav-Tharad district was formed and this town transferred into this new Vav-Tharad district.
