= Mujpur =

Village in Gujarat state, India

Mujpur, also spelled Munjpur is a village in Sankheshwar Taluka of Patan district in Gujarat, India.

== Place of interest ==
There is a mosque with a Persian writings in the name of Zafar Khan (1391–1411), son of Wajih-ul-mulk, the founder of the Muzaffarid dynasty of Gujarat Sultanate. In 1816 it suffered a heavy loss, the great plague having carried off about one-half of its people. In 1820 Munjpur had insignificant fortifications.

== Notable people ==
- Chimanlal Trivedi, Gujarati writer
