= Palanpur Agency =

Former historical country

Coordinates: 24.1693°N 72.4370°E

Palanpur Agency (1819 - 1925) Banas Kantha Agency (1925 - 1933)
- Agency of British India
- 1819–1933
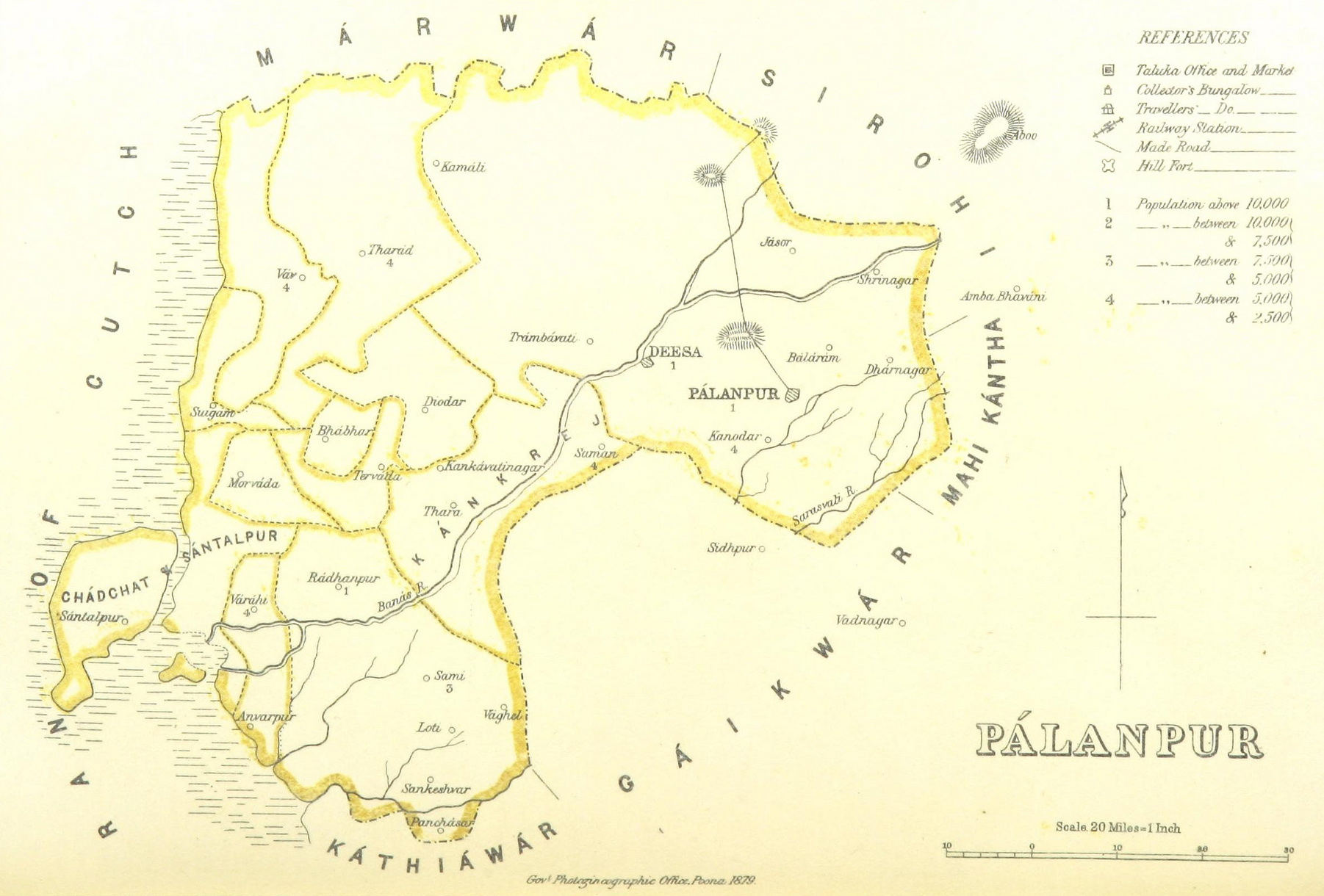
- Palanpur Agency
- Area
  - 1901: 16,558 km^{2} (6,393 sq mi)
- Population
  - 1901: 467,271
- History
  - Established: 1819
  - Changes in the Western India States Agency: 1933
Succeeded by
Western India States Agency
- This article incorporates text from a publication now in the public domain: Chisholm, Hugh, ed. (1911). "Palanpur". Encyclopædia Britannica (11th ed.). Cambridge University Press.

Palanpur Agency, also spelled Pahlunpore Agency, was a political agency or collection of princely states in British India, within the Gujarat Division of Bombay Presidency. In 1933, the native states of the Mahi Kantha Agency, except for Danta, were included in the Western India States Agency. The agency, headquartered at Palanpur, oversaw some 17 princely states and estates in the area, encompassing an area of 6393 square miles (16,558 km^{2}) and a population, in 1901, of 467,271.

== History and hierarchy ==
Established in 1819, the Agency was under the political control of the Bombay Presidency until 10 October 1924, from which date it was under the Western India States Agency, which depended directly from the Governor General of India. Of the three Political Agencies in the Northern Division of the Bombay Presidency, the next in importance to Kathiawar was the Palanpur Agency, established in 1819.

The designation of Palanpur Agency was changed to Banas Kantha Agency in 1925. Palanpur State itself was transferred to the Rajputana Agency in 1933, and the rest of the Banas Kantha Agency then merged with the Mahi Kantha Agency to form the Sabar Kantha Agency, subordinate to the Western India States Agency (WISA). On 11 November 1944 the WISA amalgamated with the Baroda and Gujarat States Agency. After the independence of India in 1947, the whole area became part of Bombay State, which in 1960 was divided into the States of Gujarat (inheriting the former WISA states territory) and Maharashtra.

Palanpur Agency had (in 1908) the political control and supervision of four states (Palanpur, Radhanpur, Tharad and Wao) and five petty estates, besides 343 non-jurisdictional Talukas and villages grouped under five thana circles, each assigned to a Thandar. These were the Deodar, Varahi, Wao, Santalpur and Kankrej thana. Palanpur and Radhanpur ranked as Salute states (i.e. entitled to the high honor of a gun salute to its native princely ruler, further classified by the number of shots), the other seven as Non-salute states. The area of the Agency was about 6,393 square miles (1901 estimate), with a population of 467,271 (1901 Census). Headquarters of the Political Agency were at Palanpur town. Other principal towns were Radhanpur and Deesa, the latter containing a large British cantonment.

The majority of the Agency was ruled by Muslim chiefs, principally those of Palanpur and Radhanpur, the petty chiefs in the Warahi thana, and the Tervada chiefs under Deodar thana. The remaining estates were ruled by Rajputs (mainly Chauhans, Vaghelas and Jadejas clans), Kolis and Brahmins. Distributed according to religion, 85 percent of the population in the Agency were Hindus (in 1901), followed by Muslims (10 percent) and Jains (5 percent).

The states lay outside the scope of British Indian laws and regulations, unless they were specially extended and applied. The Political Agent acted as Sessions Judge for the whole Agency, except for the states of Palanpur and Radhanpur. In addition he exercised the powers of a District Judge and District Magistrate in all the petty jurisdictional estates, besides being responsible, as District Officer, of general supervision of the administration of the states. The Assistant Political Agent acted as ex-officio Superintendent of the Palanpur Imperial Police, controlling the force employed in the Headquarters and thana circles.

The Deesa Cantonment was established in 1821 for the purpose of maintaining order in the Palanpur state, which had been subject to many disturbances since 1813, and to overawe the wild Bhil and Rajput outlaws, who from time immemorial had been the terror of the surrounding districts. Situated on the left bank of the Banas river, three miles (5 km) north-east of Deesa town, it had a population (in 1901) of 11,047. It contained barracks for European and native troops, a large bazaar and many officer's bungalows. As the station was reduced to a fourth class station, in 1907 it contained only a Native Infantry regiment.

On 15 November 1879 the portion of the Western Rajputana States Railway between Ahmedabad and Palanpur opened for public traffic. In 1890 the diwan of Palanpur further agreed to cede jurisdiction over certains lands for the construction of a 17-mile (27 km) railway line between Palanpur and the military cantonment of Deesa.

== Native (E)states ==
=== Salute States ===
==== Palanpur State ====
The most important state in the Agency was Palanpur State, covering an area of 1,794 square miles (4,650 km^{2}) with a population (1901) of 222,627. The ruling Lohani( Jalori ) dynasty was of Pashtun descent, and established its rule over Palanpur about 1370. In 1817 the diwan agreed to come under the protection of the British Government, whose suggestions he was bound to follow in all matters relating to his government. In recognition of his loyalty, diwan Muhammad Khan of Palanpur (ruled 1878–1918) was given the title K.C.I.E. in 1893 and that of G.C.I.E. in 1899. Just before the 1911 Coronation Darbar held for King-Emperor George V, the diwan was awarded the title of nawab, a personal salute of 13 guns, and the style of His Highness, in 1910.

==== Radhanpur State ====
Relations with Radhanpur State date from 6 July 1820, when an agreement was signed under the terms of which the Nawab was bound to pay a yearly tribute to the British. The state has been held by the Babi family since 1693, when Jafar Khan obtained Radhanpur, Sami, Munjpur and Tervada with the title of Safdar Khan. They were related to the ruling houses of Junagadh and Balasinor, two other Gujarat states. After the death of Bismillah Khan in 1895, Radhanpur was put in the charge of British officers who took over the treasury and the administration until the nawab's successor, who was a minor, came of age. In 1907 Haji Muhammad Sher Khanji was invested with full powers, but he died in 1910, and was succeeded by his brother. The state covered 1,150 square miles (3,000 km^{2}), with a population (1901) of 61,403.

The Diwan of Palanpur enjoyed a Salute of 13 guns and the Nawab of Radhanpur enjoyed a Salute of 11 guns.

=== Non-salute States ===
Of the seven smaller states, five (Tharad, Wao, Warahi, Deodar and Santalpur) signed agreements in 1820 by which they became tributary to the British. In 1826 fresh Engagements were concluded, binding the chiefs to submission to the British government, but not to payment of tribute. All chiefs agreed to forbid the transport of contraband opium through their territories in 1822. The estates of the two chiefs of Thara (24 villages within Kankrej) were originally in the Mahi Kantha Agency, but were transferred to the Palanpur Agency in 1844, owing to their proximity to Palanpur. They were bound by the same Engagements as the chiefs of Mahi Kantha, executed in 1812. and Deesa estate & thana ( Faujdari/thanedari ) was the part of Palanpur state.

==== Tharad ====
Tharad State covered 1,261 square miles (3,270 km^{2}), ranked as a 3rd Class state. Its population was 16,403 (in 1901). The state included 51 villages, and was sometimes styled Tharad and Morvada. Its rulers, Vaghela Rajputs, obtained possession of Morvada in 1508, and received Tharad in 1759 from the Nawab of Radhanpur.

==== Wao ====
Wao State, modern Vav, was a 4th Class state. Its population in 1901 was 8,286 souls, residing in 26 villages and its area was 55 sq mi (140 km^{2}). The Ranas (equivalent to Raja) of Wao (or Wao) were Chauhan Rajputs. They established themselves at Wao in 1244. Chandrasinhji Umedsinhji ruled as 20th Rana of Wav from 1884 to 1924.

==== Santalpur ====
The ruler of Santalpur State, a Jadeja Rajput, was sometimes styled Thakur of Adesar, after his estate in the nearby state of Cutch, some 15 miles (24 km) West from Santalpur. His possessions were widely scattered, and those in the district of Santalpur were mostly coshared with other estateholders. In October 1904 he was invested with the powers of a 3rd Class Magistrate, but only in his villages of Ghadsai and Kalyanpur, due east of the town of Santalpur. The population of these was 557 and 107 respectively (1901 Census). He paid tribute for Ghadsai to the Radhanpur court.

==== Warahi ====
The state of Varahi was divided between two branches of the ruling family, who belonged to a Jat clan of Muslims. Their estates were widely intermingled with those of lesser, non-jurisdictional estate holder.

- The chief of Warahi Senior was given powers of a 3rd Class Magistrate in 1901, but only within 10 villages he owned exclusively. The population of these was 1,908 in 1901.
- Warahi junior was smaller, with about 40 square miles (100 km^{2}) and 3 villages. Total population: 509 (in 1901).

==== Deodar ====
Deodar State, modern Diyodar, was equally split between two ruling branches of the same family of Vaghela Rajputs.

- The senior branch was a state with magisterial powers, controlling 12 villages (population: 2,425). Chief of the senior branch in 1926 was Khanji, son of Anandsingh (succ. 8 September 1902).
- The junior branch fell under the Deodar thana, while 13 villages fell to the junior branch (population: 3,612). Chief of the junior branch was Himatsingh.

==== Deesa ====
Deesa was an estate and thana circle, ruled by the Mandori (Jhalori) dynasty (faujdari/thanedari). Deesa was also a British military cantonment with a resident Catholic chaplain and a chapel. The British cantonment, named Deesa Field Brigade, was built in the middle of Rajasthan and Palanpur to maintain and protect the regions between Abu and Kutch from dacoits.

=== Thana circles ===
According to the Palanpur Agency Directory (1907), the thana system was introduced 'merely because the estates are so small and the authority of the proprietors so weak, that otherwise no justice at all could be obtained.' The thana circles of Wao, Varahi and Kankrej were established in 1874, those of Deodar and Santalpur in 1875. In each of these five thana circles, jurisdictional power was exercised by the Thandar, who was the officer invested with the powers of a 2nd Class Magistrate in Criminal matters, and in trying Civil suits up to the value of Rs.500. Criminal courts were established in the thanas by Govt. Resolution dated 18 July 1889.

Within the areas of the thanas five of the principal jagirdars (petty vassal chiefs) had been granted limited jurisdiction (criminal powers of a 3rd Class Magistrate and civil powers up to Rs. 250) in their own unshared villages, viz. Tervada (in Deodar thana); Suigam (in Wao thana); and Bhorol (in Tharad thana). The estates of Dhima (in Wao thana) and Sanva (in Santalpur) had formerly also been granted jurisdictional powers, but these rights were never enjoyed. Dhima lapsed to Wao State in 1917.

A sixth thana circle, that of Tharad, had been established in 1874, including jurisdiction over certain villages which paid tribute to the thakur of Tharad. But on 14 September 1904, the Tharad thana was abolished, and the jurisdiction over these Jamaiya villages was handed over to the Thakur from that date. Similarly jurisdiction over 28 Bhayadi villages of the Wao State, which were under the Wao thana, were placed under the jurisdiction of the Wao State in 1917; and the remaining villages under the thana circle were placed under the jurisdiction of the Suigam taluka, which was then granted jurisdiction, and the Wao thana was abolished. The jurisdiction granted to Suigam was withdrawn in 1927 and an Agency thana, called the Suigam Division of the Deodar thana, was constituted for the area (21 villages in 1933) over which the 11 shareholders exercised jurisdiction.
