= Radhanpur =

- City
- Location in Gujarat, India Radhanpur (India)
- Coordinates: 23.83°N 71.6°E
- Country: India
- State: Gujarat
- District: Patan
- Region: North Gujarat
- Elevation: 27 m (89 ft)

Population (2024)
  - Total: 55,076

Languages
  - Official: Gujarati, Hindi
- Time zone: UTC+5:30 (IST)
- Postal code: 385340
- Vehicle registration: GJ - 24
- Website: gujaratindia.com

Radhanpur is a city and a municipality in Patan district, Gujarat, India.

== Origin of name ==
According to the tradition, this village is named after Radhan Khan, a descendant of Fateh Khan Baloch. Fateh Khan Baloch received a freedom from the Gujarat Sultan Ahmad Shah III, which included the territory of the later day village of Radhanpur.

== History ==
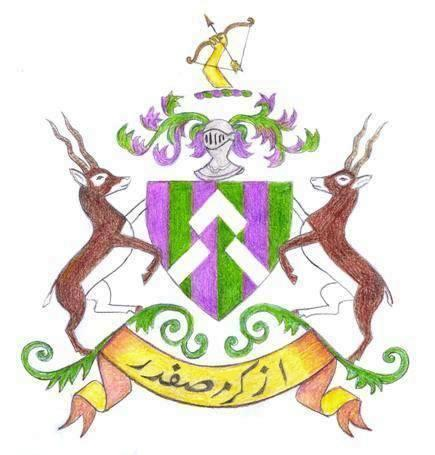
Coat of arms of Radhanpur State

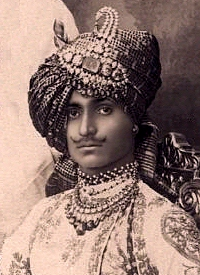
Muhammad Jalal ud-din Khan, Nawab of Radhanpur, (1889–1936)

Radhanpur belonged to the Vaghelas and was known as Lunavada after Vaghela Lunaji of the Sardhara branch of that tribe. Subsequently, it was held as a fief under the Gujarat Sultanate, by Fateh Khan Baloch, and is said to have been named Radhanpur after Radhan Khan of that family.

Babi ancestors either entered India accompanying Mughal emperor Humayun or entered the service of Sultan Muzaffar III of Gujarat Sultanate (1561–1572). Bahadur Khan Babi was, in the reign of Shah Jahan, appointed manager of Tharad, and his son Sher Khan Babi made manager, thanadar, of Chunval in 1663. Their descendants controlled various villages around Radhanpur from 1693 to 1730 as Mughal fief. In 1743, Babi descendant Jawan Mard Khan II took over viceroyalty of Ahmedabad and controlled several villages in North Gujarat. He was defeated by vaghela Un Jagir in 1753. He was defeated by Maratha Gaekwads in 1753 at Ahmedabad and Gaekwads agreed to his demand of control of villages in North Gujarat. His descendants lost some of these villages to Gaekwads subsequently. In 1813, Sher Khan made a treaty with the Gaekwar and British and became British protectorate. His descendants ruled the state until independence of India in 1947.The last ruler of Radhanpur state was His Highness Nawab Murtuza Khan Babi Bahadur.And His Highness was entitled with Hereditary 11 Gun salute.

Radhanpur State was under Palanpur Agency of Bombay Presidency, which became part of Banas Kantha Agency in 1925. Bombay Presidency was reorganised as Bombay State after independence. In 1960, Gujarat was formed from Bombay State and Radhanpur fell under its Banaskantha district.

== Geography and Climate ==
Radhanpur is located at 23.83°N 71.6°E. It has an average elevation of 27 metres (88 feet).

Climate data for Radhanpur
Month	Jan	Feb	Mar	Apr	May	Jun	Jul	Aug	Sep	Oct	Nov	Dec	Year
Mean daily maximum °C (°F)	28.0 (82.4)	31.9 (89.4)	36.1 (97.0)	40.1 (104.2)	42.2 (108.0)	39.8 (103.6)	34.5 (94.1)	33.1 (91.6)	34.3 (93.7)	36.5 (97.7)	33.6 (92.5)	29.9 (85.8)	35.0 (95.0)
Mean daily minimum °C (°F)	10.2 (50.4)	12.6 (54.7)	17.6 (63.7)	22.0 (71.6)	25.9 (78.6)	27.5 (81.5)	26.1 (79.0)	25.0 (77.0)	24.1 (75.4)	20.4 (68.7)	14.9 (58.8)	11.3 (52.3)	19.8 (67.6)
Average rainfall mm (inches)	2 (0.1)	0 (0)	1 (0.0)	0 (0)	2 (0.1)	46 (1.8)	187 (7.4)	146 (5.7)	105 (4.1)	5 (0.2)	4 (0.2)	1 (0.0)	499 (19.6)
Source: The Weather Channel

== Demographics ==
As of 2008 India census, Radhanpur had a population of 50001. Males constitute 52% of the population and females 48%. Radhanpur has an average literacy rate of 80%, higher than the national average of male literacy is and female literacy is 60%. In Radhanpur, 10% of the population is under 6 years of age.

== Places of interest ==
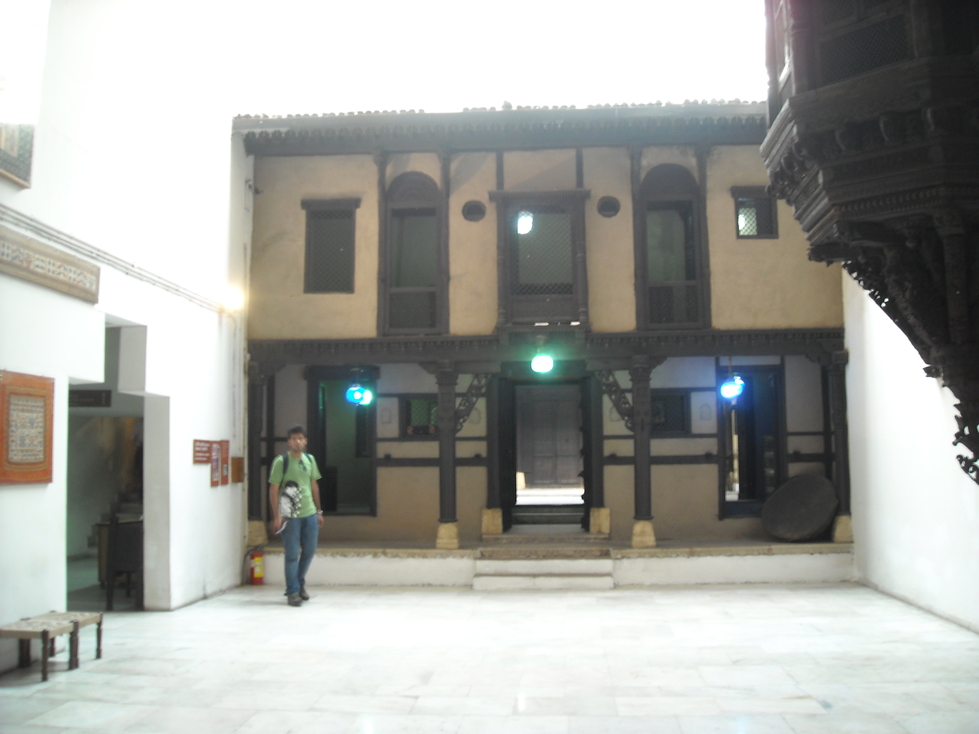
Carved Wooden houses from the palace of nawab of Radhanpur

The town was surrounded by a part stone part brick loopholed wall fifteen feet high, eight feet broad, and about two and a half miles round, with corner towers, eight bastioned gateways, outworks and a ditch in past. There is also, surrounded by a wall, an inner fort or castle, called Rajghadi, where the Nawab used to live.

Of public buildings there are twenty four old Jain and ten old Hindu temples, and ten mosques. Of the Jain temples, some are large and richly carved with coloured marble floors. There are also some small well-carved tombs of former Nawabs including complete marble tomb of Nawab, Zoravar Khan.
