= Patan district =

District in Gujarat, India

- District of Gujarat
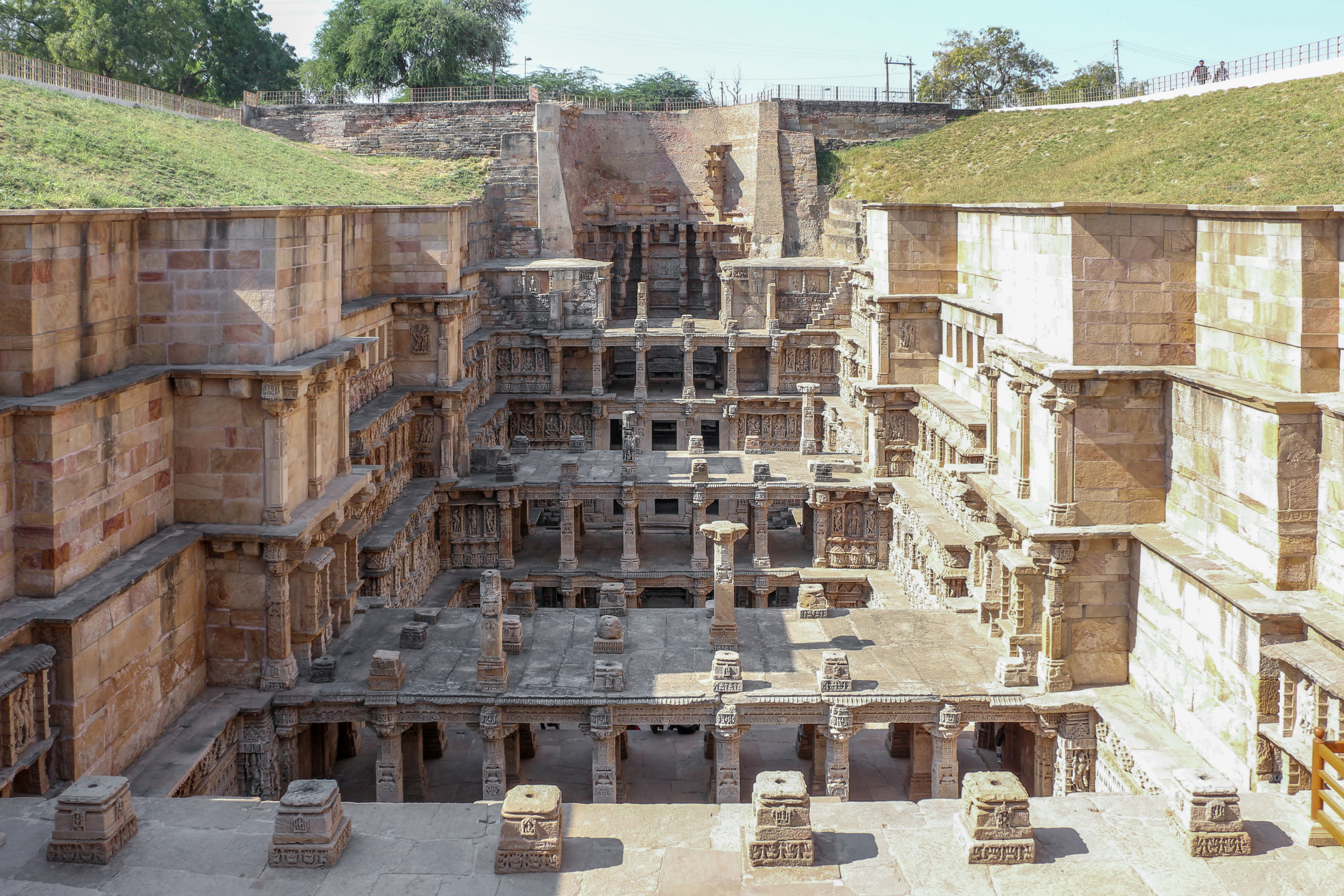
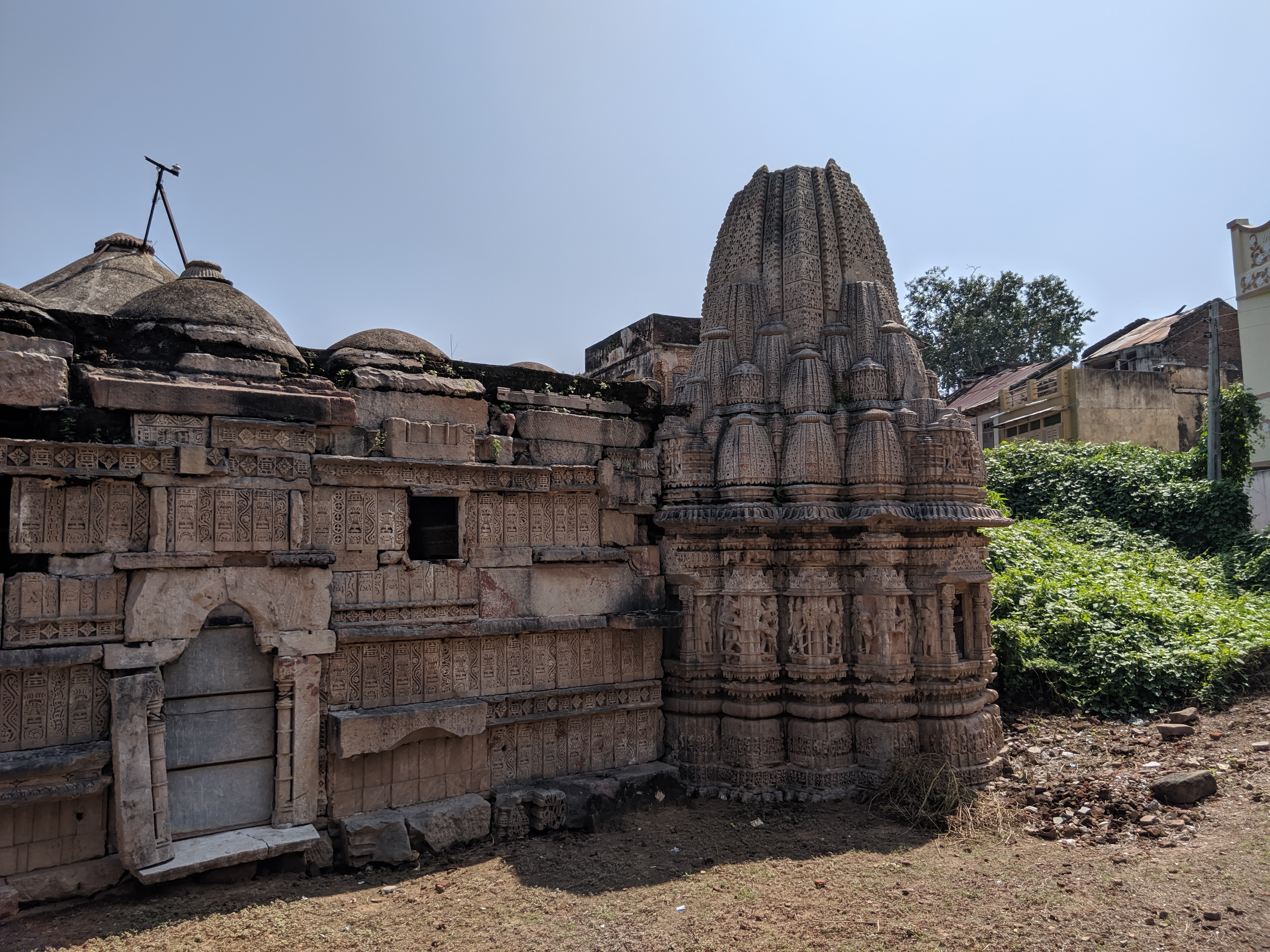
- Top: Rani ki vav in Patan; Bottom: Ruins of Rudra Mahalaya Temple in Siddhpur
- Interactive Map Outlining Patan District
- Location of district in Gujarat
- Coordinates: 23°50′N 72°07′E
- Country: India
- State: Gujarat
- Region: North Gujarat
- Founder: Vanaraja Chavda
- Named for: Anhilpur Patan
- Headquarters: Patan
- Taluks: Patan City; Siddhpur; Chanasma; Harij; Radhanpur; Santalpur; Saraswati; Shankheshwar; Sami

Government
  - District Collector: Shri Tushar Bhatt., IAS
  - MP: Bharatsinhji Dabhi

Area
  - Total: 5,792 km^{2} (2,236 sq mi)

Population (2011)
  - Total: 1,343,734
  - Density: 232.0/km^{2} (600.9/sq mi)

Languages
  - Official: Gujarati, Hindi, English
- Time zone: UTC+5:30 (IST)
- Vehicle registration: GJ-24
- Website: gujaratindia.com

UNESCO World Heritage Site
- Official name: Rani ki vav
- Type: Cultural
- Criteria: Cultural: (i), (iv)
- Designated: 2014 (38th session)
- Reference no.: 922
- Region: Southern Asia

Patan district is one of the 34 districts of Gujarat state in western India. Its main city is Patan. This district is located in northern Gujarat and bounded by Vav-Tharad district in the north, Banaskantha district in the northeast, Mehsana district in the east and southeast, Surendranagar district in the south and Kutch District and the Kutch nu Nanu Ran (Little Rann of Kutch) in the west. The district occupies an area of 5792 km^{2}.

Some of its areas, Harij and Sami, bordering Kutch are quite sensitive as there is no settled population between there and the border of Pakistan even though geographically the border is quite some distance away.

== Origin of name ==
The district is named after Patan, the headquarters of the district. It was one of the ancient and early medieval capitals of Gujarat, described vividly in the novels written by K.M. Munshi.Originally King [Vanraj Chavda] established this new city and named Anahilpur Patan OR Anhilvad Patan after the name of his very close friend Rabari chief anhil rabari. Anhil was known as an anabha in him rabari tribe. He was from ulva clan of Rabari. and the pioneer in establishing the state of Patan, the long fought battle against the then ruler from south with help of local tribals, citizens and loyal warriors to his father The king of state Panchasara few kilometers away from Patan today. Later, a number of rulers like Bhimdev, Kumarpal, Siddharaj and Karndev ruled from Patan.

== History ==
Patan District was formed on 2-10-1997 from the parts of Mahesana and Banaskantha Districts. Patan District was formed including Patan, Siddhpur, Chanasma, Harij and Sami Talukas of Mahesana district and Radhanpur and Santalpur Talukas of Banaskantha District. The headquarter of the District is Patan. There are many Hindu temples and Jain Temple in the district.

== Divisions ==
Patan district comprises nine Talukas:

- Patan
- Sidhpur
- Harij
- Radhanpur
- Sami
- Shankheshwar
- Santalpur
- Sarasvati
- Chanasma

Its headquarters is the city of Patan which, together with Modhera, is a significant tourist destination. Religious sites such as Shankheshwar Jain Temple are also popular, as is Sahastralinga Tank (a lake of thousand Lingas) and Rani ki vav (a deep well).

== Demographics ==
Religions in Patan district (2011)
Religion	Percent
Hinduism	88.91%
Islam	10.63%
Other or not stated	0.46%

According to the 2011 census Patan district has a population of 1,343,734, roughly equal to the nation of Eswatini. This gives it a ranking of 359th in India (out of a total of 640). The district has a population density of 234 inhabitants per square kilometre (610/sq mi). Its population growth rate over the decade 2001-2011 was 13.53%. Patan has a sex ratio of 935 females for every 1000 males, and a literacy rate of 72.30%. 20.92% of the population lived in urban areas. Scheduled Castes and Scheduled Tribes made up 9.18% and 0.99% of the population respectively.

=== Language ===
Languages of Patan district (2011)
1. Gujarati (98.4%)
2. Hindi (1.10%)
3. Others (0.54%)

At the time of the 2011 Census of India, 98.36% of the population in the district spoke Gujarati and 1.10% Hindi as their first language.

== Politics ==
District	No.	Constituency	Name	Party	Remarks
Patan	16	Radhanpur	Lavingji Thakor	Bharatiya Janata Party	
Patan	17	Chanasma	Dinesh Thakor	Indian National Congress	
Patan	18	Patan	Kiritkumar Patel	Indian National Congress	
Patan	19	Sidhpur	Balvantsinh Rajput	Bharatiya Janata Party	Cabinet Minister

== Solar project ==
Gujarat Solar Park at Charanka has a solar power production capacity of 750 Megawatts. The park, on the linesate, is being further developed.
