= Vav-Tharad district =

- District of Gujarat
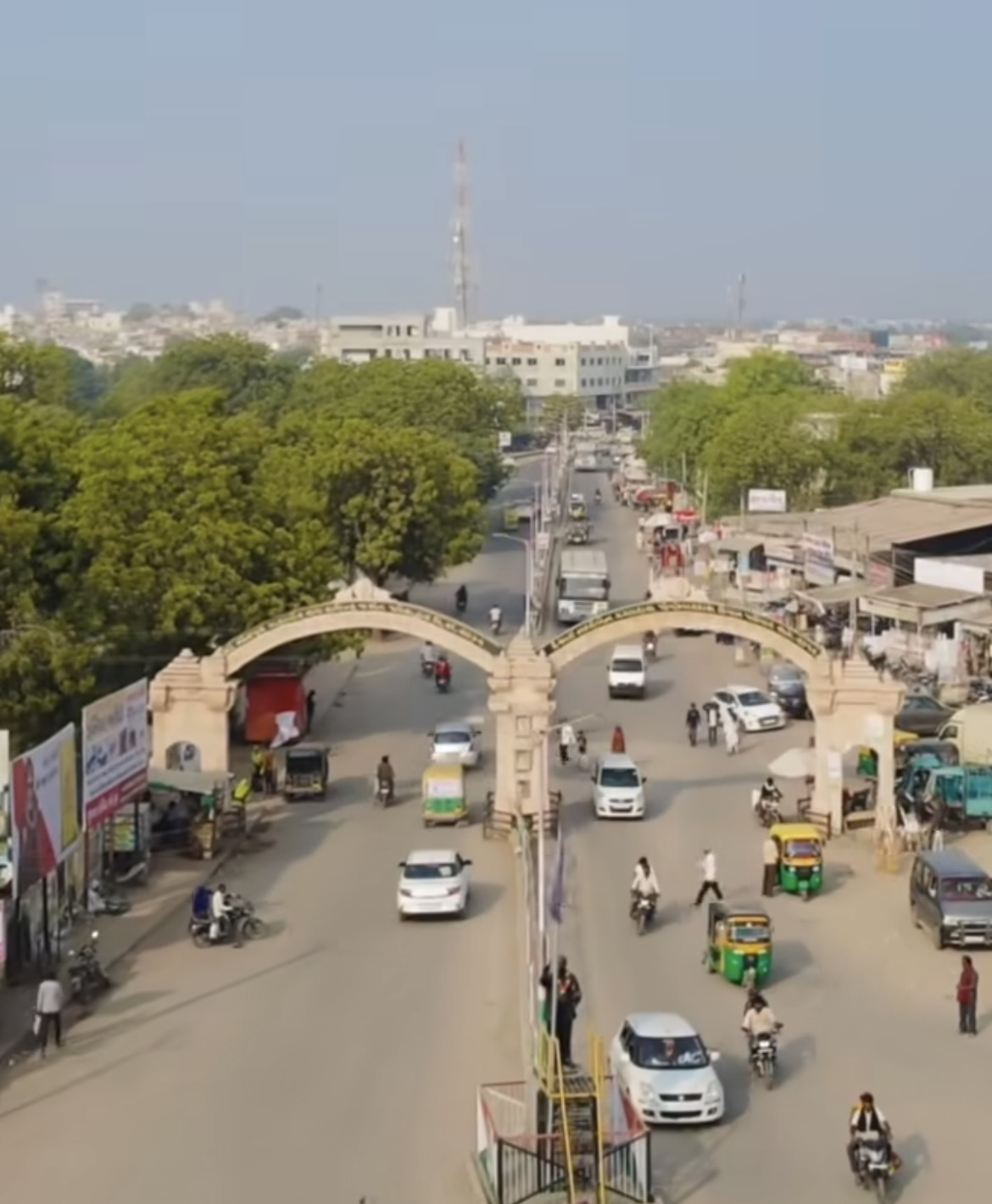
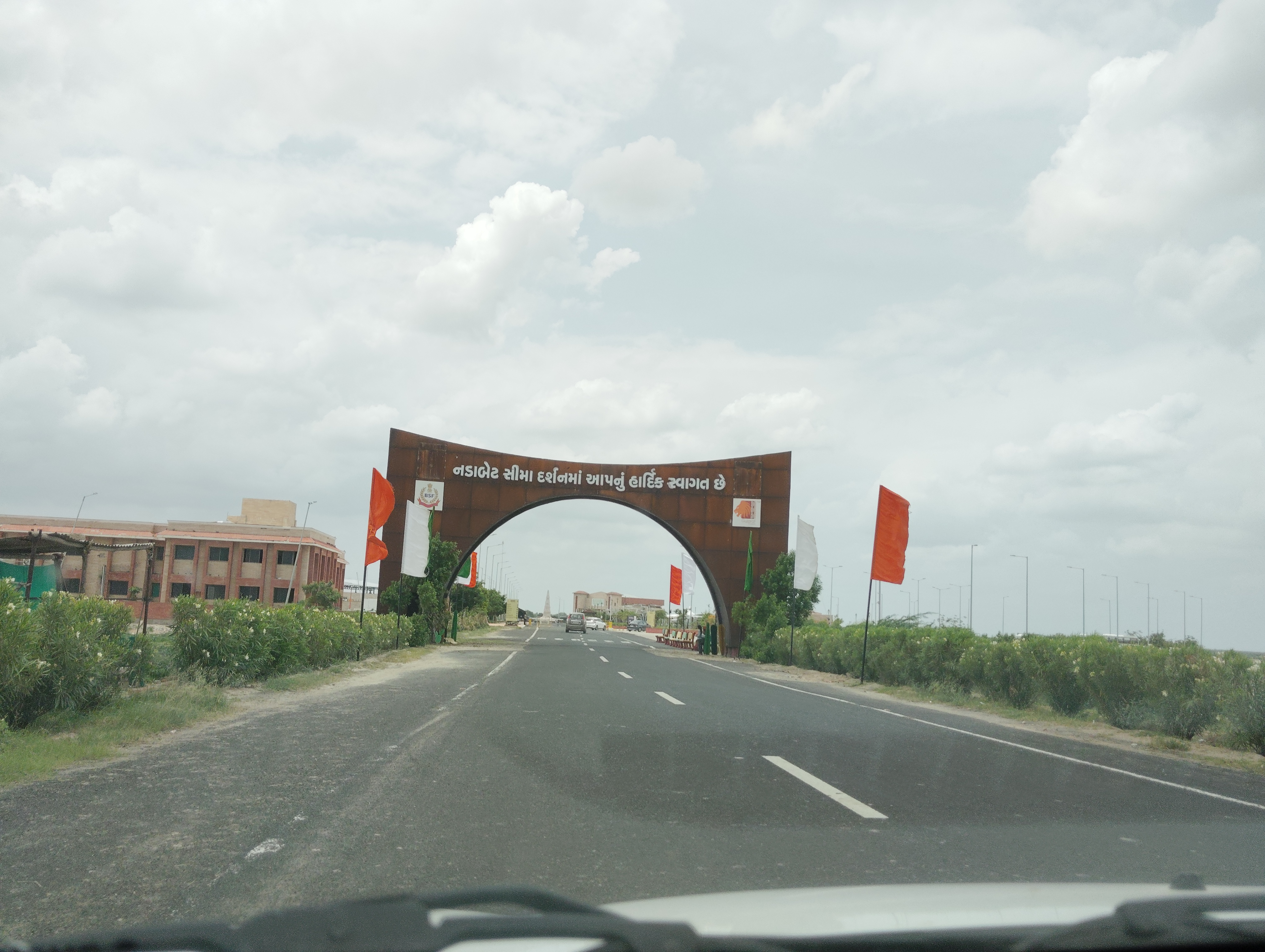
- Top: Tharad Town; Bottom: Nadabet Seema Darshan Gate in Nadabet

- Map of Vav-Tharad district in Gujarat
- Country: India
- State: Gujarat
- Region: North Gujarat
- Established: 2 October, 2025
- Headquarters: Tharad
- Talukas: Vav; Tharad; Suigam; Lakhani; Diyodar; Bhabhar; Rah; Dharnidhar

Area
  - Total: 6,257 km^{2} (2,416 sq mi)

Population (2011)
  - Total: 1,380,870
  - Density: 220.7/km^{2} (571.6/sq mi)

Languages
  - Official: Gujarati
- Time zone: UTC+5:30 (IST)
- Vehicle registration: GJ 40

Vav-Tharad district is the one of 34 districts of Gujarat, India. It is located on the eastern side of the Rann of Kutch and borders the southern side of the Rajasthan State. Its headquarters are at the city of Tharad.

Vav-Tharad was carved out from the existing Banaskantha district on 2 October 2025, making it the thirty-fourth and newest district of the Gujarat.

== Geography ==
The district is surrounded by Kutch district in the west, Banaskantha district in the east and Patan district in the south and the state of Rajasthan in the north. The West Banas River flows through its southern parts. There is an 800 year old temple of Lord Shiva in Ujjanwada village and there is a Ganga Kund where the Matri Pitr Tarpan ceremony is performed. The importance of this village is considered as sacred as Kashi Vishwanath, Somnath and Siddhapur.

== Administrative Divisions ==
Vav-Tharad district comprises eight Talukas:

- Vav
- Tharad
- Suigam
- Lakhni
- Diyodar
- Bhabhar
- Dharnidhar
- Rah

Its headquarters are at the city of Tharad which, together with Vav, is also a significant tourist destination.

== Demographics ==
According to the 2011 census Vav-Tharad district has a population of 1,380,870, roughly equal to the nation of Swaziland. The district has a population density of 220 inhabitants per square kilometre (570/sq mi) .

Religions in Vav-Tharad district (2011)
Religion	Percent
Hinduism	97.24%
Islam	2.21%
Other or not stated	0.52%

== Politics ==
District	No.	Constituency	Name	Party	Remarks
Banaskantha & Vav-Tharad	7	Vav	Geniben Thakor	Indian National Congress	Elected to 18th Loksabha
Banaskantha & Vav-Tharad	7	Vav	Swarupji Thakor	Bharatiya Janata Party	Elected on 23 November 2024
Banaskantha & Vav-Tharad	8	Tharad	Shankarbhai Chaudhary	Bharatiya Janata Party	Speaker
Banaskantha & Vav-Tharad	9	Dhanera	Mavjibhai Desai	Independent	
Banaskantha & Vav-Tharad	10	Danta (ST)	Kantibhai Kharadi	Indian National Congress	
Banaskantha & Vav-Tharad	11	Vadgam (SC)	Jignesh Mevani	Indian National Congress	
Banaskantha & Vav-Tharad	12	Palanpur	Aniket Thakar	Bharatiya Janata Party	
Banaskantha & Vav-Tharad	13	Deesa	Pravin Mali	Bharatiya Janata Party	
Banaskantha & Vav-Tharad	14	Deodar	Keshaji Chauhan	Bharatiya Janata Party	
Banaskantha & Vav-Tharad	15	Kankrej	Amrutbhai Thakor	Indian National Congress	

== Notable people ==
- Geniben Thakor - Member of Parliament Banaskantha & Vav-Tharad
- Babubhai Desai Member of Parliament Rajya Sabha Gujarat Former MLA * Kankrej Assembly constituency
- Parbatbhai Patel - former MP from Banaskantha.
- Shankar Chaudhary- MLA from Tharad Assembly constituency.
- Ranchordas Pagi, scout for the Indian Army during the India–Pakistan war of 1965 and the India–Pakistan war of 1971
