= List of speakers of the Gujarat Legislative Assembly =

Speaker of the Gujarat Legislative Assembly
- Seal of Gujarat

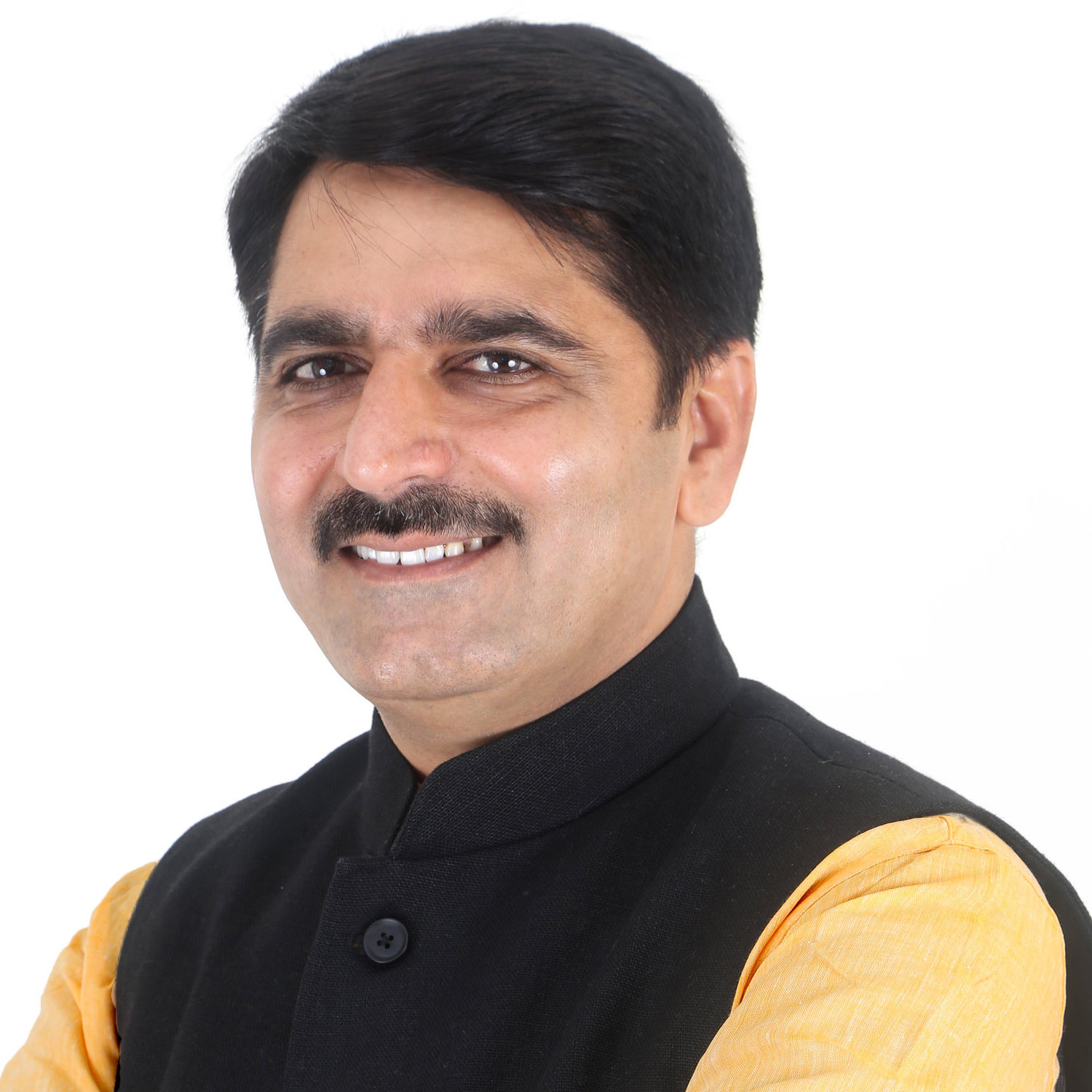
- Incumbent; Shankar Chaudhary since 20 December 2022
- Style: The Hon’ble (formal); Mr. Speaker (informal)
- Member of: Gujarat Legislative Assembly
- Reports to: Government of Gujarat
- Appointer: Members of the Gujarat Legislative Assembly
- Term length: During the life of the Gujarat Legislative Assembly (five years maximum)
- Deputy: Deputy Speaker of the Gujarat Legislative Assembly

== List of speakers ==
Election year	Assembly	Party in Majority	Name	Term	Duration
1957	1st	INC	Kalyanji V. Mehta	1 May 1960 – 19 August 1960	110 days
1957	1st	INC	Mansinhji Rana	19 August 1960 – 19 March 1962	1 year, 212 days
1962	2nd	INC	Fatehali Palejwala	19 March 1962 – 17 March 1967	4 years, 363 days
1967	3rd	INC(O)	Raghavji Leuva	17 March 1967 – 28 June 1975	8 years, 103 days
1972	4th	INC	Raghavji Leuva	17 March 1967 – 28 June 1975	
1975	5th	INC(O)	Kundanlal Dholakia	28 June 1975 – 28 March 1977	1 year, 273 days
1975	5th		Manubhai Palkhiwala (Acting Speaker)	28 March 1977 – 21 April 1977	24 days
1975	5th	JP	Kundanlal Dholakia	21 April 1977 – 20 June 1980	3 years, 60 days
1980	6th	INC	Natwarlal Shah	20 June 1980 – 8 January 1990	9 years, 202 days
1985	7th	INC	Natwarlal Shah	20 June 1980 – 8 January 1990	
1985	7th	INC	Karsandas Soneri (Acting Speaker)	8 January 1990 – 19 January 1990	11 days
1985	7th	JD	Barjorji Pardiwala	19 January 1990 – 16 March 1990	56 days
1990	8th	INC	Shashikant Lakhani	16 March 1990 – 12 November 1990	241 days
1990	8th	INC	Manubhai Parmar (Acting Speaker)	12 November 1990 – 11 February 1991	91 days
1990	8th	INC	Himatlal Mulani	11 February 1991 – 21 March 1995	4 years, 38 days
1995	9th	BJP	Harishchandra Patel	21 March 1995 – 16 September 1996	1 year, 179 days
1995	9th	BJP	Chandubhai Dabhi (Acting Speaker)	16 September 1996 – 29 October 1996	43 days
1995	9th	BJP	Gumansinhji Vaghela	29 October 1996 – 19 March 1998	1 year, 141 days
1998	10th	BJP	Dhirubhai Shah	19 March 1998 – 27 December 2002	4 years, 283 days
2002	11th	BJP	Prof. Mangaldas Patel	27 December 2002 – 18 January 2008	5 years, 22 days
2007	12th	BJP	Ashok Bhatt	18 January 2008 – 29 September 2010	2 years, 254 days
2007	12th	BJP	Prof. Mangaldas Patel (Acting Speaker)	29 September 2010 – 23 February 2011	147 days
2007	12th	BJP	Ganpat Vasava	23 February 2011 – 26 December 2012	1 year, 307 days
2007	12th	BJP	Vajubhai Vala (Acting Speaker)	26 December 2012 - 19 January 2013	24 days
2007	12th	BJP	Neema Acharya (Acting Speaker)	19 January 2013 – 22 January 2013	3 days
2012	13th	BJP	Vajubhai Vala	23 January 2013 - 30 August 2014	1 year, 219 days
2012	13th	BJP	Mangubhai C. Patel (Acting Speaker)	30 August 2014 – 9 November 2014	71 days
2012	13th	BJP	Ganpat Vasava	9 November 2014 – 7 August 2016	1 year, 272 days
2012	13th	BJP	Parbatbhai Patel (Acting Speaker)	7 August 2016 – 22 August 2016	15 days
2012	13th	BJP	Ramanlal Vora	22 August 2016 – 19 February 2018	1 year, 181 days
2017	14th	BJP	Rajendra Trivedi	19 February 2018 – 13 September 2021	3 years, 206 days
2017	14th	BJP	Dr. Nimaben Acharya	13 September 2021 – 20 December 2022	1 year, 98 days
2022	15th	BJP	Shankar Chaudhary	20 December 2022 - Incumbent	3 years, 304 days

== Deputy speaker ==
Election year	Assembly	Party in Majority	Name	Term		Duration
2012	13th	BJP	Mangubhai Patel	3 October 2013	20 November 2014	1 year, 48 days
2012	13th	BJP	Atmaram Parmar	25 February 2015	6 August 2016	1 year, 163 days
2012	13th	BJP	Shambhuji Thakor	22 August 2016	20 December 2017	1 year, 120 days
2017	14th	BJP	Jethabhai Ahir	27 September 2021	16 February 2026	4 years, 142 days
2022	15th	BJP	Jethabhai Ahir			
2022	15th	BJP	Purnesh Modi	16 February 2026	Incumbent	246 days

== Pro tem Speaker ==
A pro-tem speaker conducts the proceedings of the house till a speaker is elected.

=== List of Pro tem Speakers ===
Yogesh Patel 2022
