= Chavda (surname) =

Chavda or Chawda is an Indian Gujarati surname, mostly found among the Rajput Katia, Rabari and Ahir Mestri, Kadia Kshatriya, Muslim caste groups based in the Indian states of the Gujarat and Rajasthan.

== Notables ==
Some individuals who bear the Chavda as their surname;

- Shiavax Chavda Indian painter, illustrator and muralist
- Akbarbhai Chavda Indian politicians
- Ashok Chavda Gujarati poet
- Jawaharbhai Chavda Indian politicians
- Amit Chavda Indian politicians
- Vinodbhai Chavda Indian politicians
- Harisinh Pratapsinh Chavda Indian politicians
- Zohraben Chavda Indian politicians
- Ishwarbhai Chavda Indian politicians
- C. J. Chavda Indian politicians
- Kishansinh Chavda Indian politicians
- Neha Chavda Indian Cricketer
- Bharat Chawda Indian actor
- Khora Ramji Chawda Indian railway contractor

== See also ==
- Chavda (disambiguation)
- Chavda dynasty
