= Manubhai Amersey =

Indian politician (born 1928)

Member of Parliament, Lok Sabha
- In office 1967–1969
- Preceded by: Zohraben Chavda
- Succeeded by: S. K. Patil
- Constituency: Banaskantha, Gujarat

Personal details
- Born: 27 May 1928
- Party: Swatantra Party
- Spouse: Urmila Manubhai Amersey

Manubhai Nandlal Amersey (born 27 May 1928) was an Indian politician. He was elected to the Lok Sabha, the lower house of the Parliament of India from Banaskantha, Gujarat.
