= Deodar Assembly constituency =

Legislative Assembly constituency in Gujarat State, India

Coordinates: 24.12°N 71.78°E

Deodar
- Constituency No. 14 for the Gujarat Legislative Assembly

Constituency details
- Country: India
- Region: Western India
- State: Gujarat
- District: Vav-Tharad
- Lok Sabha constituency: Banaskantha
- Total electors: 253,414
- Reservation: None

Member of Legislative Assembly
- 15th Gujarat Legislative Assembly
- Incumbent Keshaji Chauhan
- Party: Bharatiya Janata Party
- Elected year: 2022

Deodar is one of the 182 Legislative Assembly constituencies of Gujarat state in India. It is part of Vav-Tharad district. It is numbered as 14-Deodar.

== List of segments ==
This assembly seat represents the following segments,

1. Deodar Taluka
2. Deesa Taluka (Part) Villages – Jadiyali, Bhadra, Nandla, Ghana, Bhakadiyal, Kotda, Dhunsol, Dhroba, Kherola, Pechhdal, Sarat, Kamodi, Deka, Vasna (Kuda), Jasara, Kuda, Chekra, Kamoda, Devsari, Zenal, Nani, Jhakol, Matu, Dodana, Moral, Lakhani, Vasna (Vatam), Manaki, Agthala, Chitroda, Katarva, Gamdi, Varnoda, Godha, Mota Kapra, Nana Kapra, Vakvada, Dharanva, Shergadh, Peplu, Taleganj, Balodhar, Gharnal Nani, Gharnal Moti, Nesda Juna, Nesda Nava, Ramvas, Paldi, Ratanpura, Soyla, Nava Bhildi, Bhildi.

== Members of Legislative Assembly ==
Year	Member	Picture	Party
2007	Anil Mali		Bharatiya Janata Party
2012	Keshaji Chauhan		Bharatiya Janata Party
2017	Bhuriya Shivabhai Amrabhai		Indian National Congress
2022	Keshaji Chauhan		Bharatiya Janata Party

== Election results ==
=== 2022 ===
2022 Gujarat Legislative Assembly election: Deodar
Party	Candidate	Votes	%	±%
BJP	Keshaji Chauhan	109,123	56.66	
INC	Shivabhai Amrabhai Bhuriya	70,709	36.71	
AAP	Bhemabhai Ragnathbhai Chaudhary	5,065	2.63	
NOTA	None of the above	3,071	1.59	
Majority		38,414	19.95	
Turnout				
Registered electors		253,162		

=== 2017 ===
2017 Gujarat Legislative Assembly election: Deodar
Party	Candidate	Votes	%	±%
INC	Shivabhai Bhuriya	80,432	48.27	
BJP	Keshaji Chauhan	79,460	47.69	
None of the Above	None of the Above	2,988	1.79	New
Majority			0.58	
Turnout		1,66,626	77.32	
Registered electors		215,498		
INC gain from BJP		Swing		

=== 2012 ===
2012 Gujarat Legislative Assembly election
Party	Candidate	Votes	%	±%
BJP	Keshaji Chauhan	76,265	48.95	
INC	Govabhai Hamirabhai Rabari	55,456	35.60	
Independent	Hirabhai Vaghela	12,882	8.27	
Majority		20,809	13.35	
Turnout		155,810	82.17	
Registered electors				
BJP hold		Swing		

=== 2007 ===
2007 Gujarat Legislative Assembly election
Party	Candidate	Votes	%	±%
BJP	Anil Mali	48,936	37.49	
BSP	Manshihji Vaghela	28,544	21.87	
INC	Geni Thakor	24,951	19.12	
Independent	Keshaji Chauhan	21,252	16.28	
Majority			12.62	
Turnout		130,522		
BJP hold		Swing		

== See also ==
- List of constituencies of the Gujarat Legislative Assembly
- Banaskantha district
