= Haribhai Parthibhai Chaudhary =

Indian politician

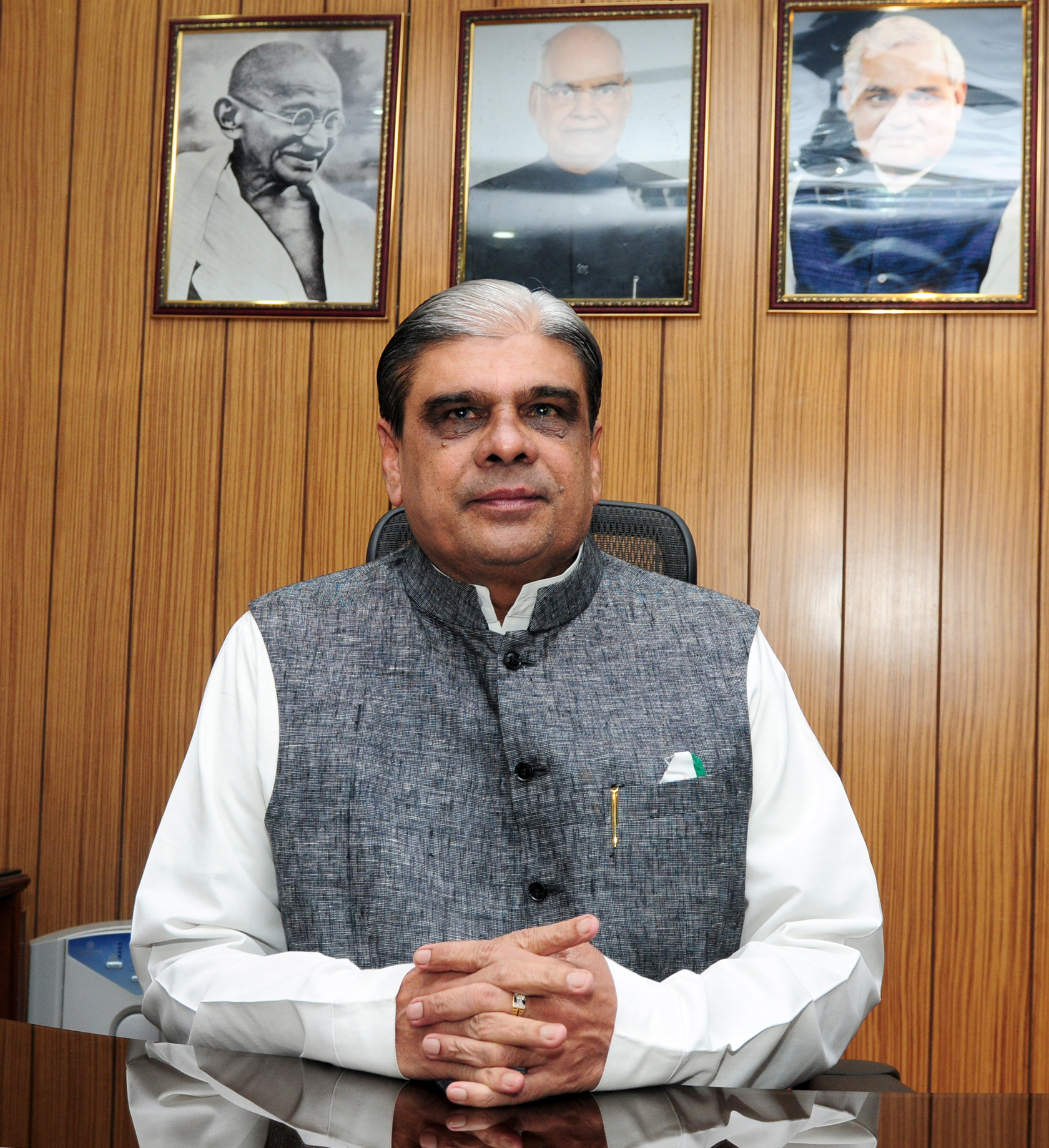

Minister of state for Coal
- In office 3 September 2017 – 30 May 2019
- Prime Minister: Narendra Modi
- Minister: Piyush Goyal

Minister of state for Mines
- In office 3 September 2017 – 30 May 2019
- Prime Minister: Narendra Modi
- Minister: Narendra Singh Tomar

Minister of state for Micro, Small & Medium Enterprises
- In office 5 July 2016 – 3 September 2017
- Prime Minister: Narendra Modi
- Minister: Kalraj Mishra

Minister of state for Home Affairs
- In office 9 November 2014 – 5 July 2016
- Prime Minister: Narendra Modi
- Minister: Rajnath Singh

Member of Parliament, Lok Sabha
- In office 2013–2019
- Preceded by: Mukesh Gadhvi
- Succeeded by: Parbatbhai Patel
- Constituency: Banaskantha
- In office 1998–2004
- Preceded by: B. K. Gadhvi
- Succeeded by: Harisinh Chavda
- Constituency: Banaskantha

Personal details
- Born: 20 July 1954 (age 72) Jagana, Banaskantha district (Gujarat).
- Party: Bharatiya Janata Party
- Parents: Parthibhai Ghemarbhai Chaudhary (father); Mena Ben (mother)
- Education: Mumbai University
- Profession: Agriculturist, Businessperson & Politician

Haribhai Parthibhai Chaudhary is an Indian politician and was the Minister of State for Coal and Mines in government of India. He represents the Banaskantha constituency of Gujarat and is a member of the Bharatiya Janata Party political party.

== Early life and education ==
Haribhai Chaudhary was born in village Jagana (in Banaskantha district, Gujarat). He has received MCom degree from Mumbai University. Prior to entering politics, Chaudhary was an Agriculturist and a Businessperson.

== Political career ==
Haribhai Chaudhary joined Bharatiya Janata Party in late 1980s and held various party posts. He has been elected for three terms as Member of Parliament from the Banaskantha constituency. Chaudhary contested and won the by-election in 2013 after the sitting MP Mukesh Gadhvi died of Brain stroke.

== Posts Held ==
#	From	To	Position
01	1998	1999	Member, 12th Lok Sabha
02	1999	2004	Member, 13th Lok Sabha
03	1999	2004	Member, Standing Committee, Urban and Rural Development
04	1999	2004	Member, Consultative Committee for the Ministry of Agriculture
05	1999	2004	Member, Committee on Government Assurances
06	1999	2004	Member, Rehabilitation Council of India
07	1999	2004	Member, Standing Committee on Finance
08	1999	2004	Member, Committee on Public Accounts
09	1999	2004	Member, Committee on Chemical Fertilizer
10	1999	2004	Member, Committee on Commerce
11	1999	2004	Member, Standing Committee on Transport and Tourism
12	1999	2004	Member, Consultative Committee on Petroleum
13	2013	2014	Member, 15th Lok Sabha
14	2014	2019	Member, 16th Lok Sabha
15	2014	2019	Union Minister of State for Home Affairs

== See also ==
- 12th Lok Sabha
- 13th Lok Sabha
- 15th Lok Sabha
- Politics of India
- Parliament of India
- Government of India
- Banaskantha (Lok Sabha constituency)
- Bharatiya Janata Party
