= North Gujarat =

Region of Gujarat, India

- Region
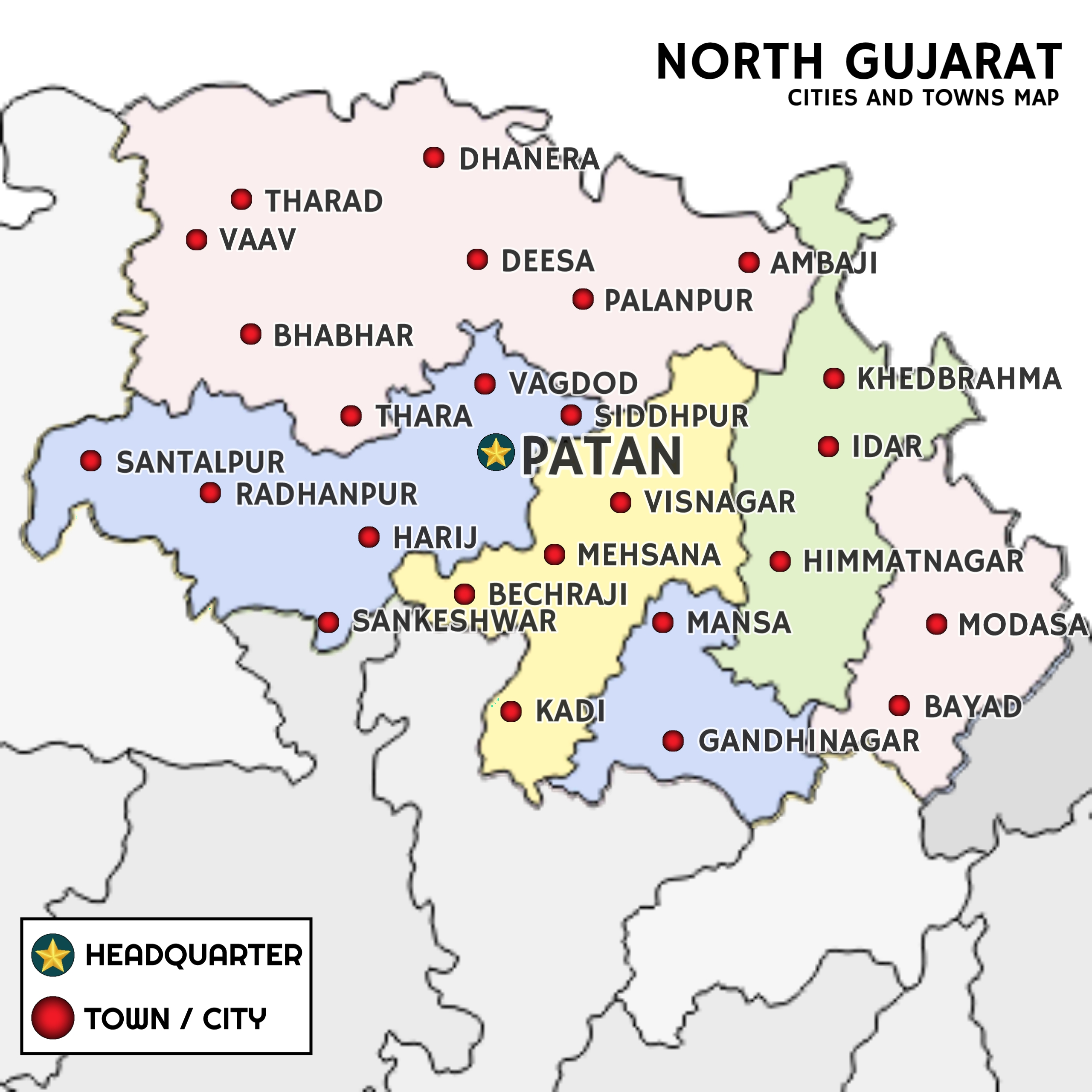
- Map of North Gujarat
- Interactive map of North Gujarat
- Country: India
- Region: West India
- Largest city: Gandhinagar
- Districts: 7

Area
  - Total: 33,734 km^{2} (13,025 sq mi)
- Time zone: UTC+05:30 (IST)

North Gujarat, also called Uttar Gujarat, is the northern region of the Indian state of Gujarat, it includes the districts of Gandhinagar, Banaskantha, Patan, Aravalli, Mehsana Sabarkantha and Vav-Tharad district. Patan city is the administrative headquarters of North Gujarat. There Are Two Municipal Corporations in North Gujarat, Mehsana And Gandhinagar. North Gujarat is dominant in the dairy industry.

Currently, the water table of the region is dropping 6 meters every year.

== Linguistics (Dialect) ==
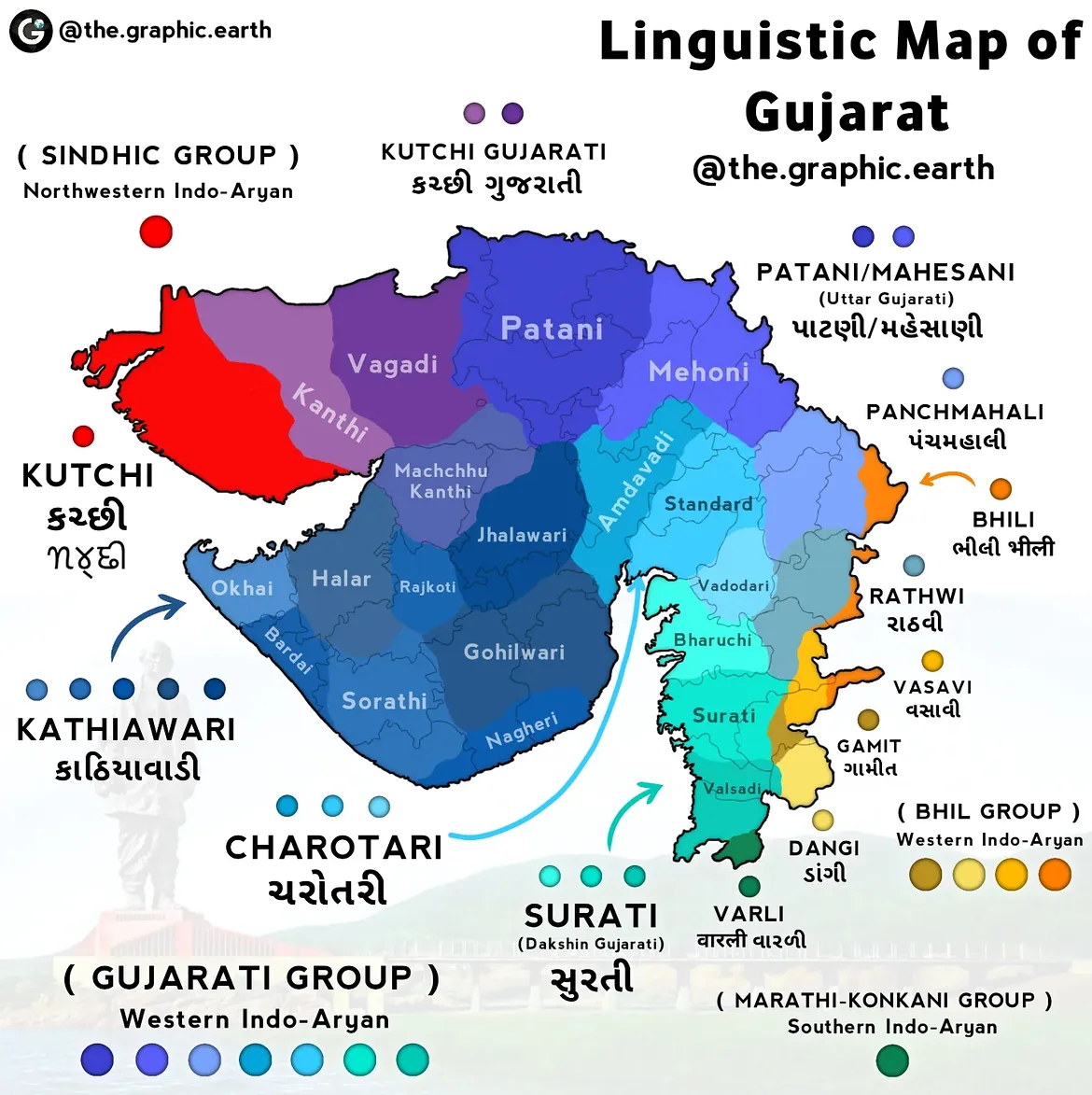

The dialect of Gujarati spoken here is Uttar Gujarati which also has two varieties Patani and Mehsani. Mehsani, also referred as 'Mehoni' in native accent is spoken in the districts of Mehsana, Sabarkantha and Gandhinagar. In Uttar Gujarati, 'Chhe' of Standard Gujarati is replaced with 'se', 'sa', 'he' or 'ha' and 'aa' sound becomes 'aw'. Uttar Gujarati is rich with many such linguistic differences.

Sr. No.	English	Standard Gujarati	Uttar Gujarati
1	Water	પાણી	પૉણી
2	Village	ગામ	ગૉમ
3	Why	કેમ	ચમ
4	How	કઈ રીતે/કેમ	ચૅમ

According to the 2011 Census, this region has a population of 10,319,646 people.

== Cities and districts ==
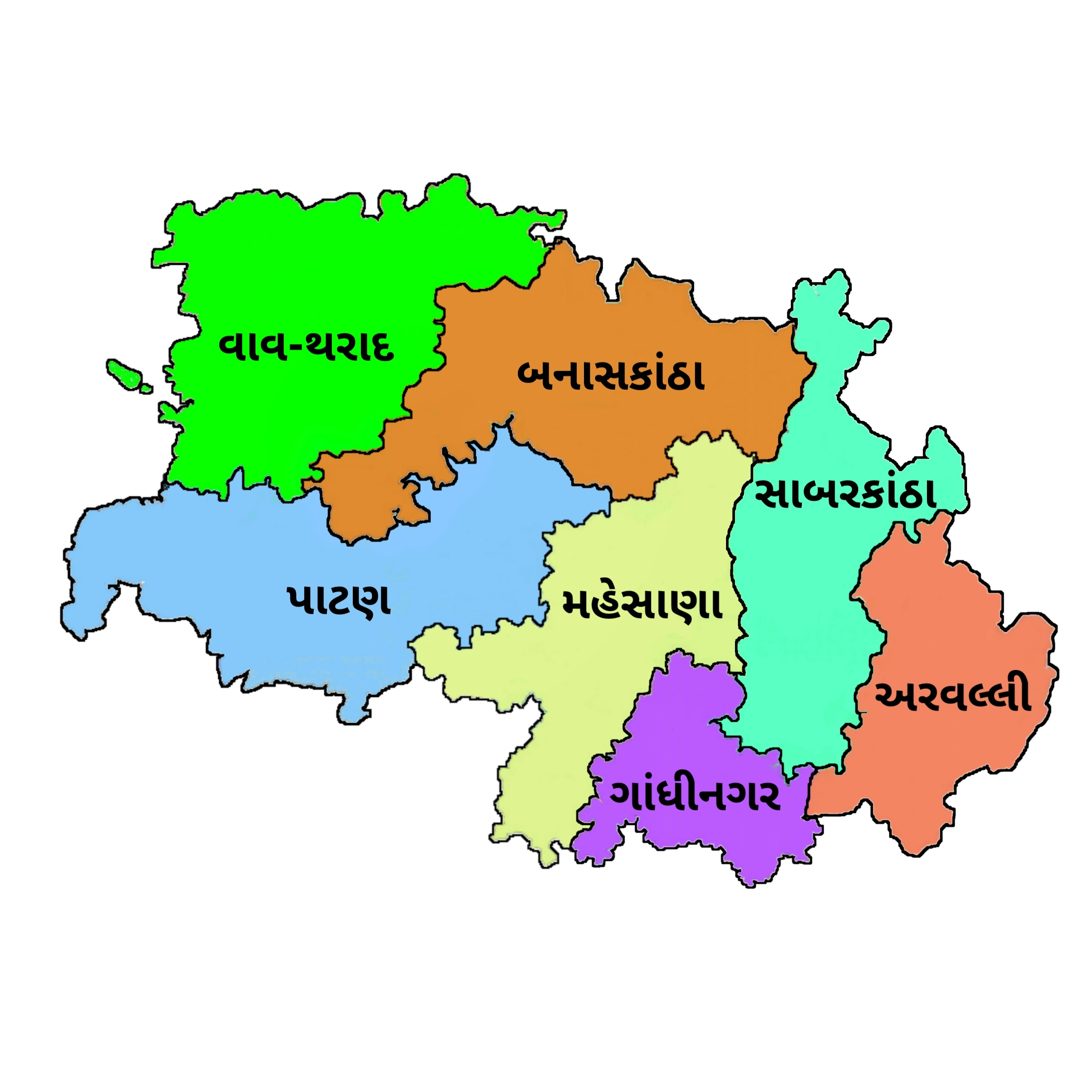
District map of North Gujarat

Gandhinagar is the largest city in the region.

Other important cities are Palanpur, Patan, Mehsana, Himmatnagar, Modasa, Sidhpur, Kalol,Kadi, Unjha and Visnagar.

Districts in the region are Banaskantha district, Mehsana district, Sabarkantha district, Patan district (the largest), Gandhinagar district, Aravalli district and Vav-Tharad district.

City/Town	District	Note
Palanpur	Banaskantha district	
Dhanera	Banaskantha district	
Deesa	Banaskantha district	
Thara	Banaskantha district	
Patan	Patan District	
Sidhpur	Patan District	
Radhanpur	Patan District	
Harij	Patan District	
Chanasma	Patan District	
Sami	Patan District	
Santalpur	Patan District	
Shankheshwar	Patan District	
Gandhinagar	Gandhinagar district	
Kalol	Gandhinagar district	
Mansa	Gandhinagar district	
Dahegam	Gandhinagar district	
Mehsana	Mehsana district	
Visnagar	Mehsana district	
Kadi	Mehsana district	
Unjha	Mehsana district	
Bechraji	Mehsana district	
Kheralu	Mehsana district	
Vadnagar	Mehsana district	
Satlasana	Mehsana district	
Vijapur	Mehsana district	
Himmatnagar	Sabarkantha district	
Vijaynagar	Sabarkantha district	
Talod	Sabarkantha district	
Prantij	Sabarkantha district	
Idar	Sabarkantha district	
Khedbrahma	Sabarkantha district	
Vadali	Sabarkantha district	
Modasa	Aravalli district	
Bhiloda	Aravalli district	
Meghraj	Aravalli district	
Bayad	Aravalli district	
Dhansura	Aravalli district	
Malpur	Aravalli district	
Tharad	Vav-Tharad district	Vav-Tharad is the newest and 34th district of Gujarat formed on October 2, 2025 after being carved out from the Banaskantha district.
Bhabhar	Vav-Tharad district	Vav-Tharad is the newest and 34th district of Gujarat formed on October 2, 2025 after being carved out from the Banaskantha district.

== Universities ==
University	City	District	Note
Hemchandracharya North Gujarat University	Patan	Patan District	
Gokul Global University	Sidhpur	Patan District	
Indian Institute of Technology Gandhinagar	Gandhinagar	Gandhinagar District	
Gujarat Technological University	Gandhinagar	Gandhinagar District	
Ganpat University	Mehsana	Mehsana District	
Sankalchand Patel University	Visnagar	Mehsana District	

== Tourism ==
S. No	Tourism Sites	Location	Note
1.	Rani Ki Vav	Patan, Gujarat	UNESCO World Heritage
2.	Modhera Sun Temple	Modhera, Mehsana, Gujarat	
3.	Ambaji Temple	Ambaji, Banaskantha, Gujarat	
4.	Zero Point and Nadabet (India-Pakistan Border)	Nadabet, Vav-Tharad, Gujarat	
5.	Umiya Mata Temple	Unjha, Gujarat	

== Prehistory ==
Evidence of prehistoric settlements in North Gujarat were first discovered in 1893 by British geologist Bruce Foote. Archeological expeditions in the 1940s and 1950s that microlithic-using hunter-gatherers, agro-pastoralists, early farmers, and Harappan settlements all coexisted at the Langhnaj site located in the Mehsana district of Gujarat.

== Education ==
- Banas Medical College and Research Institute, Palanpur
- Sardarkrushinagar Dantiwada Agricultural University
- Government Engineering College, Palanpur
- North Gujarat University, Patan
- Government Engineering College, Patan
- Government Engineering College, Modasa
- Government Engineering College, Gandhinagar
- IIT Gandhinagar
- Gujarat Technological University
- Gujarat Technological University School of Engineering and Technology
- Ganpat University

== Rivers ==
- Banas River
- Saraswati River
- Sabarmati River
