= Vav Assembly constituency =

Legislative Assembly constituency in Gujarat State, India

Coordinates: 24.37°N 71.51°E

Vav
- Constituency No. 7 for the Gujarat Legislative Assembly

Constituency details
- Country: India
- Region: Western India
- State: Gujarat
- District: Vav-Tharad
- Lok Sabha constituency: Banaskantha
- Established: 2007
- Total electors: 302,189
- Reservation: None

Member of Legislative Assembly
- 15th Gujarat Legislative Assembly
- Incumbent Swarupji Thakor
- Party: BJP
- Elected year: 2024

Vav is one of the 182 Legislative Assembly constituencies of Gujarat state in India. It is part of Vav-Tharad district. It is numbered as 7-Vav.

== List of segments ==
This assembly seat represents the following segments,

1. Vav Taluka
2. Bhabhar Taluka
3. Santalpur Taluka (part) of Patan District Village – Kesargadh
4. Suigam Taluka

== Members of Legislative Assembly ==
Year	Member	Party
1985	Parbatbhai Patel	Indian National Congress
1990	Patel Mavjibhai Chatarabhai	Janata Dal
1995	Parbatbhai Patel	Independent politician
1998	Rajput Hemaji Darghaji	Indian National Congress
2002	Rajput Hemaji Darghaji	Indian National Congress
2007	Parbatbhai Patel	Bharatiya Janata Party
2012	Shankar Chaudhary	Bharatiya Janata Party
2017	Thakor Geniben Nagaji	Indian National Congress
2022	Thakor Geniben Nagaji	Indian National Congress
2024*	Swarupji Thakor	Bharatiya Janata Party

== Election results ==
=== 2024 by-election ===
Gujarat Legislative Assembly by-election 2024: Vav
Party	Candidate	Votes	%	±%
BJP	Swarupji Thakor	92,129	42.02	▲3.65
INC	Gulabsinh Rajput	89,734	40.91	▼4.35
IND	Mavjibhai Patel	27,195	12.40	New
NOTA	None of the above	3,358	1.53	▼0.23
Majority		2,395	1.09	▼5.79
Turnout		219,364	70.55	▼4.40
BJP gain from INC		Swing	-0.35	

=== 2022 ===
2022 Gujarat Legislative Assembly election: Vav
Party	Candidate	Votes	%	±%
INC	Thakor Geniben Nagaji	102,513	45.26	
BJP	Swarupji Thakor	86,912	38.37	
Ind	Amirambhai Shankarbhai Ashal	27,346	12.07	
NOTA	None of the above	3,997	1.76	
AAP	Dr Bhim Patel	1,596	0.7	New
Majority			6.89	
Turnout				
INC hold		Swing		

=== 2017 ===
Gujarat Legislative Assembly election, 2017: Vav
Party	Candidate	Votes	%	±%
INC	Geniben Thakor	102,328	49.00	+14.45
BJP	Shankar Chaudhary	95,673	45.82	+4.49
NOTA	None of the above	3,765	1.80	New
Majority		6,655	3.18	−3.59
Turnout		2,08,824	81.22	+3.4
INC gain from BJP		Swing		

=== 2012 ===
Gujarat Assembly election, 2012
Party	Candidate	Votes	%	±%
BJP	Shankar Chaudhary	72,640	41.33	−5.24
INC	Geni Thakor	60,729	34.55	+16.7
NCP	Chandulal Thakkar	30,185	17.17	New
Majority		11911	6.77	
Turnout		175883	77.82	
BJP hold		Swing		

=== 2007 ===
Gujarat Assembly election, 2007
Party	Candidate	Votes	%	±%
BJP	Parbat Patel	73,230	46.57	+4.96
Independent	Mavjibhai Patel	30,521	19.41	New
INC	Vikrambhai Pirabhai Rajput	28,072	17.85	−32.19
BSP	Ganeshdanji Gadhvi	10,569	6.72	
Majority		42,709	27.16	
Turnout		1,57,249		
BJP gain from INC		Swing		

=== 2002 ===
Gujarat Assembly election, 2002
Party	Candidate	Votes	%	±%
INC	Hemaji Rajput	72640	50.04	
BJP	Parbat Patel	58402	41.61	
Majority		11826	8.43	
Turnout		140363	69.61	
INC hold		Swing		

=== 1998 ===
Gujarat Assembly election, 1998
Party	Candidate	Votes	%	±%
INC	Hemaji Rajput	72730	57.84	
BJP	Mavjibhai Patel	48773	38.79	
Majority		23957	19.05	
Turnout		130676	78.53	
INC hold		Swing		

=== 1995 ===
Gujarat Assembly election, 1995
Party	Candidate	Votes	%	±%
Independent	Parbat Patel	52640	41.20	
INC	Hemaji Rajput	50519	39.54	
Majority		2121	1.66	
Turnout		131322	79.32	
Independent hold		Swing		

=== 1990 ===
Gujarat Assembly election, 1990
Party	Candidate	Votes	%	±%
JD	Mavjibhai Patel	36339	41.34	
INC	Parbat Patel	32088	36.50	
Majority		4251	4.84	
Turnout		89540	63.79	
JD hold		Swing		

=== 1985 ===
Gujarat Assembly election, 1985
Party	Candidate	Votes	%	±%
INC	Parbat Patel	46208	65.04	
Independent	Harisinhji Chavda	23367	32.89	
Majority		22841	32.15	
Turnout		73126	54.92	
INC hold		Swing		

=== 1980 ===
Gujarat Assembly election, 1980
Party	Candidate	Votes	%	±%
INC	Hemabhai Parmar	27474	47.20	
JP	Jagatbhai Kandali	22830	39.22	
Majority		4644	7.98	
Turnout		60192	52.80	
INC hold		Swing		

=== 1975 ===
Gujarat Assembly election, 1975
Party	Candidate	Votes	%	±%
INC	Hemabhai Parmar	19991	42.57	
INC(O)	Jetsibhai Paya	18965	40.39	
Majority		1026	2.18	
Turnout		50742	51.73	
INC(O) hold		Swing		

=== 1972 ===
Gujarat Assembly election, 1972
Party	Candidate	Votes	%	±%
INC	Daulatbhai Parmar	13396	51.17	
INC(O)	Sartanbhai Kalabhai Parmar (vavdi)	8170	31.21	
Majority		5226	19.96	
Turnout		28783	38.38	
INC hold		Swing		

=== 1967 ===
Gujarat Assembly election, 1967
Party	Candidate	Votes	%	±%
SWA	J. P. Parmar	20812	68.55	
INC	K. M. Parmar	9550	31.45	
Majority		11262	37.09	
Turnout		33495	50.43	
SWA hold		Swing		

== See also ==
- List of constituencies of the Gujarat Legislative Assembly
- Banaskantha district
