= Motibhai Chaudhary =

Indian politician

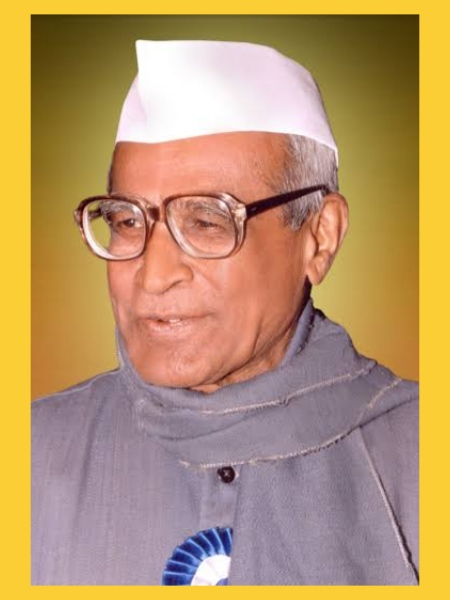

Member of Parliament, Lok Sabha
- In office 1977–1980
- Preceded by: Popatlal Joshi
- Succeeded by: B.K. Gadhvi
- Constituency: Banaskantha

Personal details
- Born: 23 June 1923 Balwa village, Kalol taluk, Mehsana District
- Died: 1 May 2005 (aged 81)
- Party: Janata Party
- Other political affiliations: Bharatiya Lok Dal; Indian National Congress (O); Indian National Congress
- Spouse: Monghi Ben
- Children: 3 sons and 3 daughters

Motibhai Chaudhary (1923-2005) was an Indian politician and was the member of 6th Lok Sabha from Banaskantha. He started his political career in 1972 when he was elected to Gujarat Legislative Assembly. He was Minister of Transport in Gujarat. He was chairman of Dudhsagar Dairy.
