= K. Ratna Prabha =

Former Chief Secretary of Karnataka

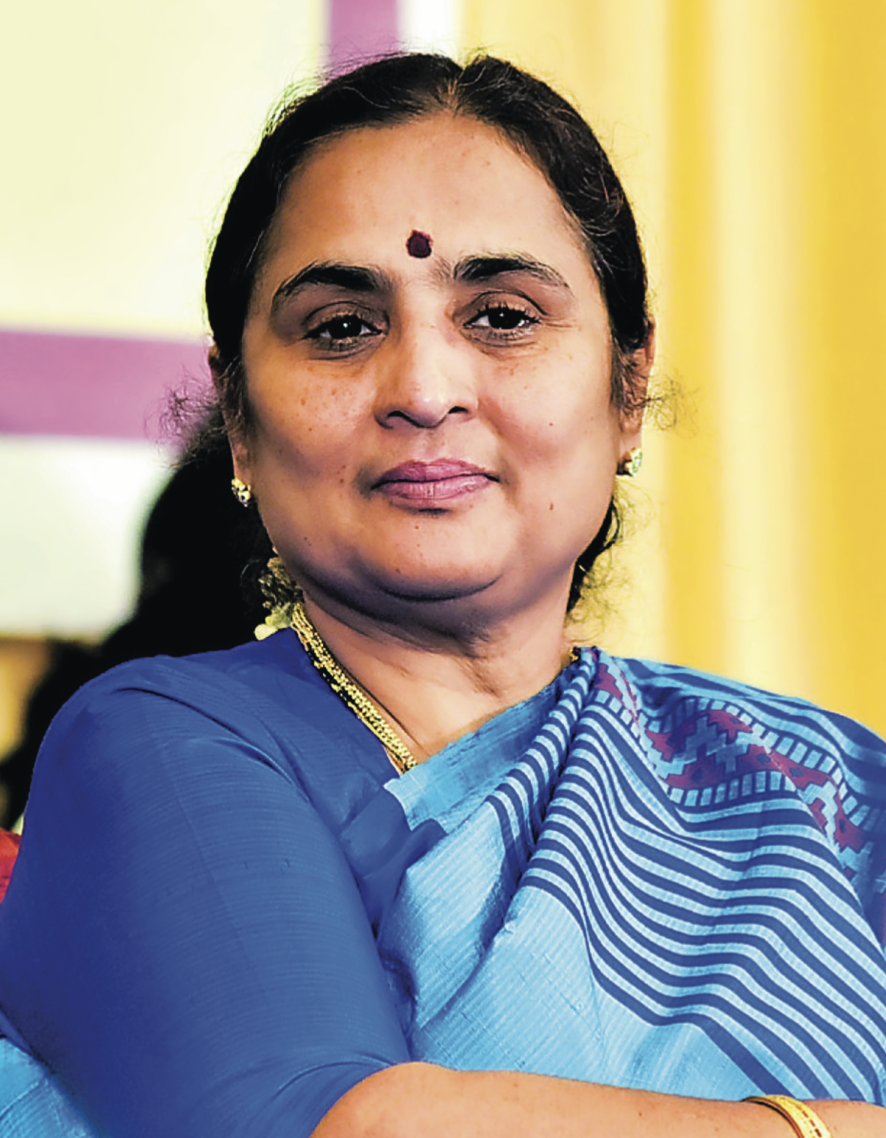
- Ratna Prabha in 2016

3rd Woman Chief secretary (India)
- In office December 01, 2017 – June 01, 2018
- Chief Minister: Siddaramaiah
- Preceded by: Subhash Chandra Khuntia
- Succeeded by: Vijay Bhaskar
- Governor: Vajubhai Vala

Personal details
- Born: Hyderabad, Telangana, India
- Spouse: K. Vidya Sagar
- Occupation: Civil service IAS
- Website: Official website

K. Ratna Prabha is a retired Indian Administrative Service (IAS) officer of the 1981 batch. She served as the Chief Secretary to the Government of Karnataka, making her the state's third woman to hold the highest bureaucratic post. Following a 37-year career in the civil services, she became the Chairman of the Karnataka Skill Development Authority and founded the Ubuntu Consortium, a platform supporting women entrepreneurs.

== Early life and education ==
Ratna Prabha was born in Hyderabad to a family of civil servants and medical professionals. Her father, K. Chandraiah, was an IAS officer who served as the first district collector of Hyderabad. Her mother, Dr. K. Vimala Bai, originally from Karkala, graduated from Madras Medical College in 1948 and served as the head of the dermatology department at Gandhi Hospital. She has two brothers, including Pradeep Chandra, who also served as an IAS officer and retired as the Chief Secretary of Telangana.

She holds postgraduate degrees in Sociology and English and secured a first rank in French. During her college years, she played women's cricket and represented her state in table tennis at the national level.

== Civil Service Career ==
=== Early Career in Karnataka (1981–1995) ===
Clearing the civil services examination on her first attempt in 1981, Ratna Prabha began her administrative career as the Assistant Commissioner of Bidar, marking the first time a woman held the post. Later, as the Special District Commissioner of Development in Chikmagalur, she successfully implemented a pilot project for the Development of Women and Children in Rural Areas (DWCRA), which leased land to women for coffee cultivation to promote financial independence.

Following her marriage, she served a four-year stint in Hyderabad as the first regional officer of the Film Censor Board, where her efficiency in clearing films within a day was credited with helping the Telugu film industry relocate from Chennai to Hyderabad. In 1990, she became the first female Deputy Commissioner of Raichur. During this tenure, she managed sensitive water disputes involving the Tungabhadra canal and rehabilitated Devadasi women by distributing irrigated agricultural land, housing, and auto-rickshaws. She subsequently returned to serve as the Deputy Commissioner of Bidar.

=== Deputation to Andhra Pradesh and Central Government (1995–2014) ===
Following the death of her father in 1995, Ratna Prabha moved to Andhra Pradesh on an inter-state deputation. She became the first woman Development Commissioner of the Visakhapatnam Export Processing Zone (VEPZ), serving for seven years and facilitating the establishment of a major diamond processing unit that employed over 3,000 women.

In 2004, she was appointed the IT Secretary of Andhra Pradesh. In this role, she drafted the state's 2005 IT policy, which introduced unprecedented provisions for women, including workplace protection and maternity benefits, alongside establishing Jawahar Knowledge Centres in colleges. On central deputation in Delhi, she served as the Additional Secretary in the Ministry of Women and Child Development, where she authored critical project reports that shaped the Nirbhaya scheme, One-Stop Crisis Centres, and the Beti Bachao, Beti Padhao initiative. She was repatriated to Karnataka in April 2011.

=== Chief Secretary of Karnataka (2014–2018) ===
Upon returning to Karnataka, Ratna Prabha served as the Additional Chief Secretary of the Industries and Commerce Department from 2014 to 2016. She authored the 2014–2019 Karnataka Industrial Policy—the state's first to feature dedicated provisions and special tech parks for women in cities like Hubballi, Mysuru, and Kalaburagi. Under her administration, Karnataka rose from the 13th position to the top spot nationally in industrial investments, and she received praise for anchoring the successful 2016 Global Investors Meet.

On November 30, 2017, she was sworn in as the Chief Secretary of Karnataka, succeeding Subhash Chandra Khuntia. She was the third woman to hold the state's top bureaucratic role, following Teresa Bhattacharya (2000) and Malathi Das (2006). Her appointment meant that Karnataka's civil administration and police force were simultaneously headed by women, coinciding with Neelamani N. Raju's appointment as DG & IGP. Scheduled to retire in March 2018, she received a three-month extension and officially retired in June 2018

== Post-Retirement and Entrepreneurship Support ==
After retiring, Ratna Prabha officially registered the Ubuntu Consortium on March 8, 2019, serving as its founder-president. The non-governmental organization networks 24 women's associations across multiple states, supporting over 12,000 female entrepreneurs with business advisory and digital transformation services. Under her leadership, Ubuntu signed an MoU with the Global Alliance for Mass Entrepreneurship (GAME) to further boost mass women's entrepreneurship. She also initiated the She for Her platform to highlight success stories of women helping other women

== Personal life ==
Ratna Prabha is fluent in Konkani and has taught the language to her children. She is an avid photography enthusiast and is married to K. Vidya Sagar, a retired IAS officer who served as a Special Chief Secretary in Andhra Pradesh. She has authored a book recounting her experiences as an IAS officer titled Chronicles of an AC Saab

== Awards and Recognition ==
- Woman of the Year Award: Conferred by the American Biographical Institute Inc., USA, for two successive years in 1999 and 2000.
- Tun Dr. Mahathir Mohamad Good Global Exemplary Leadership Award: Presented by the BRICS-ASEAN Chamber of Commerce (BACC) in Malaysia in December 2025, honoring her exceptional contributions to governance, institutional strengthening, and community-focused development
