= Shankar Chaudhary =

Indian politician

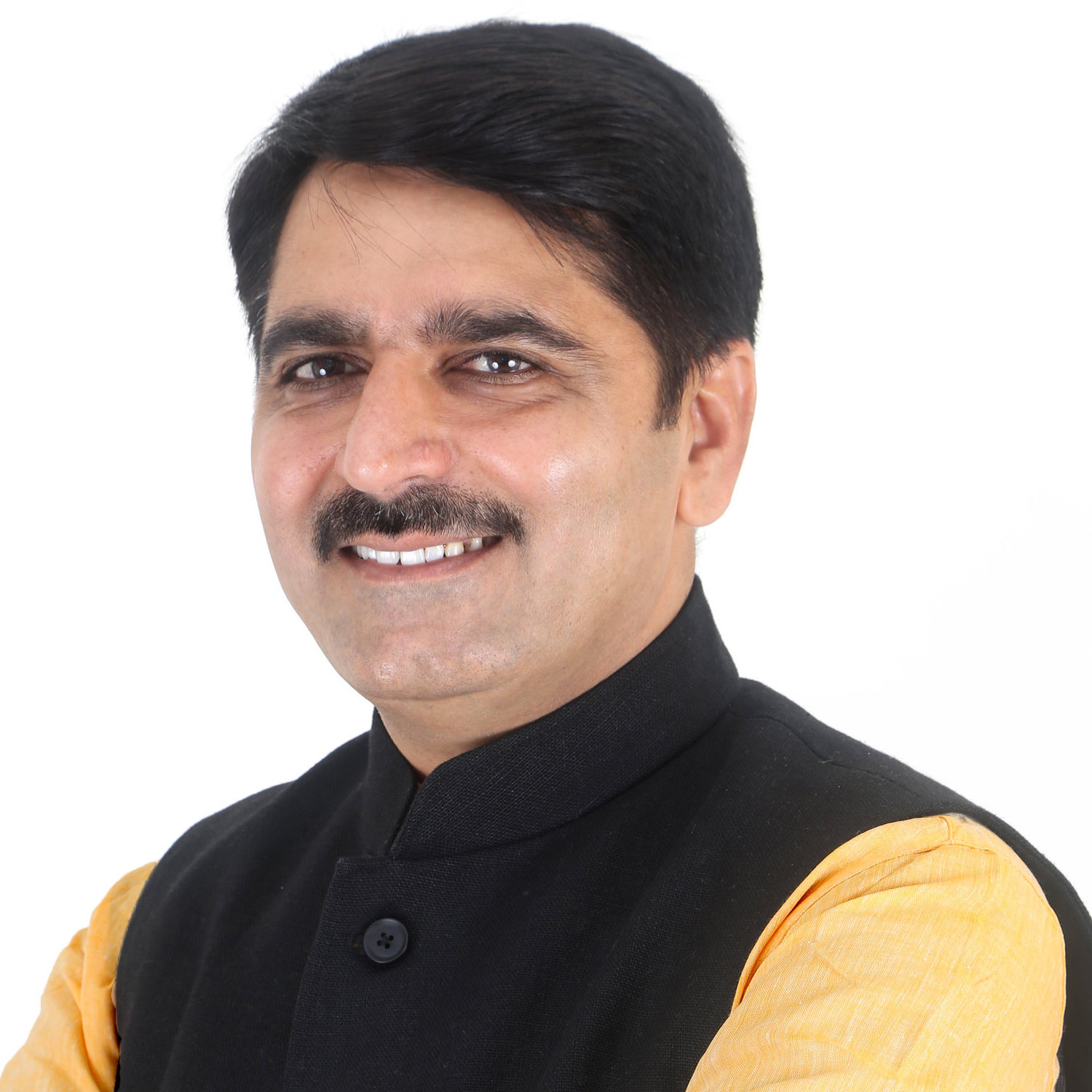

Speaker of Gujarat Legislative Assembly
- Incumbent
- Assumed office 20 December 2022
- Leader of the House: Bhupendra Patel
- Deputy Speaker: Jethabhai Ahir Purnesh Modi
- Preceded by: Dr. Nimaben Acharya

Minister of State for Urban Housing (Independent Charge), Health, Family Welfare and Transport, Government of Gujarat
- In office 22 May 2014 – 7 August 2016

Minister of State for Medical Education, Environment (All Independent charges) & Urban Development, Government of Gujarat
- In office 7 August 2016 – 26 December 2017

Member of Gujarat Legislative Assembly
- Incumbent
- Assumed office 2022
- Preceded by: Gulabsinh Pirabhai Rajput
- Constituency: Tharad
- In office 2012–2017
- Preceded by: Parbatbhai Patel
- Succeeded by: Geniben Thakor
- Constituency: Vav
- In office 1998–2012
- Preceded by: Lavingji Muljiji Solanki
- Succeeded by: Nagarji Thakor
- Constituency: Radhanpur

Personal details
- Born: 3 December 1970 (age 55) Vadnagar, Gujarat, India
- Party: Bharatiya Janata Party

Shankarbhai Lagdhirbhai Chaudhary (born 3 December 1970) is an Indian politician from Gujarat state. He is the Speaker of Gujarat Legislative Assembly since December 2022. He was a Member of Legislative Assembly from 1998 to 2017 and again since 2022.

== Political career ==
He contested his first ever election of the Legislative Assembly at the age of just 27 years against the then Chief Minister Shankarsinh Vaghela in 1997 from Radhanpur. However, in the subsequent election held in 1998, he was elected the Member of the Legislative Assembly from Radhanpur constituency.

He was the Minister of State for Health and Family Welfare, Medical Education, Environment (All Independent charges) and Urban Development, Government of Gujarat under Anandiben Patel ministry.

In 2015, he was elected unopposed as the chairman of Banaskantha District Cooperative Milk Federation, Palanpur (Banas Dairy) ending 24-year reign of Parthi Bhatol. He was the Chairman of the Banaskantha District Central Co-operative Bank and Vice-Chairman of The Gujarat State Co-operative Bank and General Secretary of the Gujarat Pradesh Bharatiya Janta Party.

He lost in 2017 Gujarat Legislative Assembly election from Vav against Indian National Congress candidate Geniben Thakor.

He was elected from Tharad constituency in 2022 Gujarat Legislative Assembly election. He was elected as the Speaker of Gujarat Legislative Assembly on 20 December 2022.
