= Nadabet =

Village in Gujarat state, India

Nadabet નડાબેટ
- Village
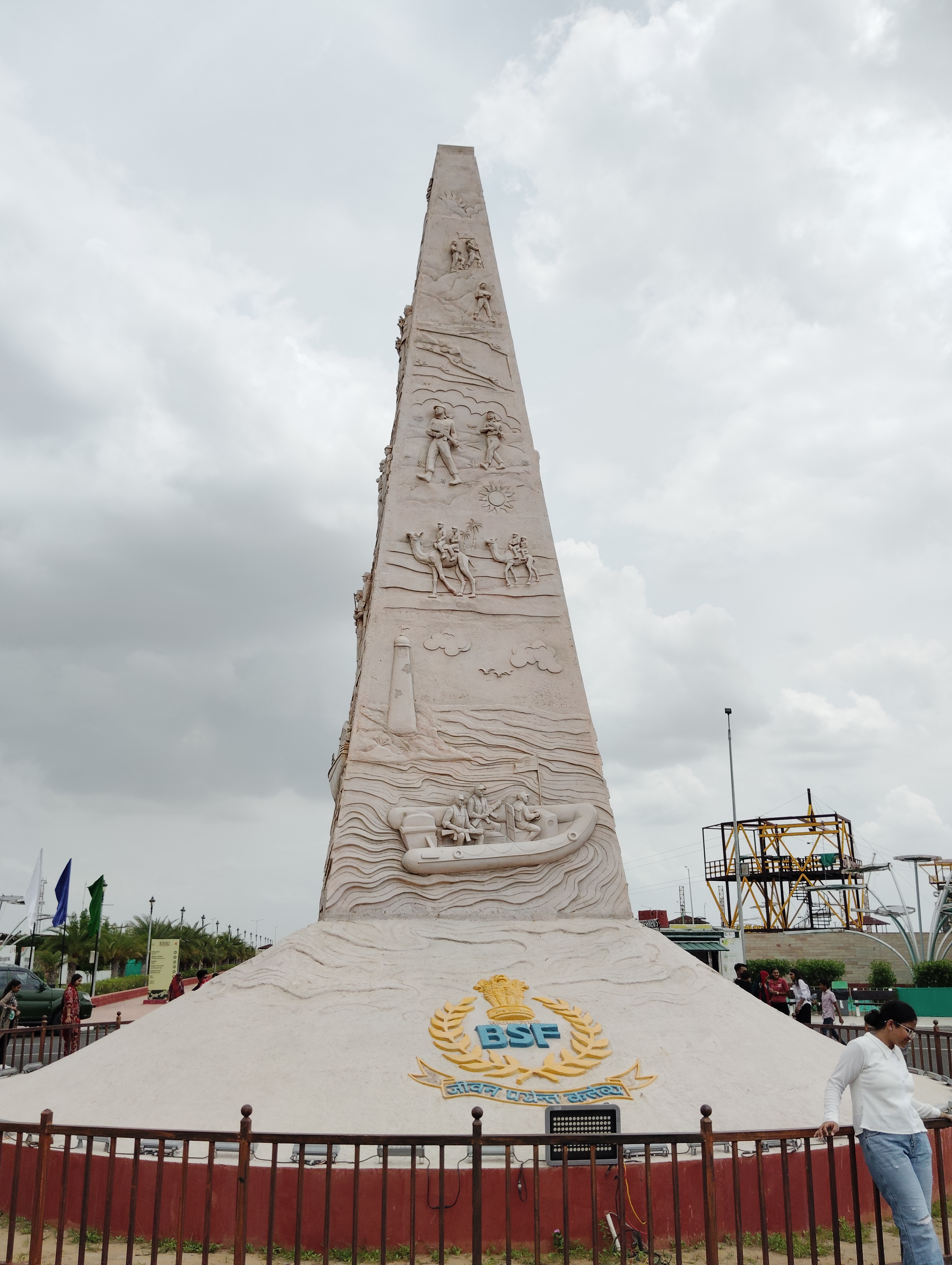
- BSF Stambh, a memorial obelisk at Nadabet
- Interactive map of Nadabet
- Coordinates: 24.223987°N 71.207350°E
- Country: India
- State: Gujarat
- District: Vav-Tharad district

Government
  - Body: Gram Panchayat

Languages
  - Official: Gujarati, Hindi
- Time zone: UTC+5:30 (IST)
- Website: gujaratindia.com

Nadabet is a village in Suigam Taluka of Vav-Tharad district of Gujarat, India. Known as the 'Wagah of Gujarat', it is a border location developed as a tourist destination under Seema Darshan Project by the Gujarat Tourism Department and the Border Security Force (BSF).

== Tourism ==
=== Seema Darshan border tourism project ===
The idea of developing Nadabet as a tourist spot gained momentum as part of the Seema Darshan Project, initiated to commemorate the 50th anniversary of the 1971 Indo-Pak war. The project, costing ₹125 crore, aims to provide visitors with a first-hand experience of the life of BSF personnel and the challenges faced at the border.

One-Sided Ceremonial Display display is held by India's BSF from Tue to Sun (closed on Monday), with a major tourist complex on India side which also has museum and cafe. It has become a significant destination for patriotic tourism.

=== Nadeshwari Mata Temple ===
There is a Nadeshwari Mata Temple, inside the wildlife sanctuary, and it opens from 6:00 am to 8:00 om, prayers are performed twice daily, major Hindu festivals like Navratri and Chaitra Purnima are also celebrated.

Older legend links the goddess to the Navaghana (late 11th century king), 11th century King of Chudasama dynasty of Junagadh and Saurashtra, according to which the Mother Goddess Nadeshwari appeared as a young girl to provide food and guide to the king across the ocean (now the Rann of Kutch salt desert) to rescue his sister from the Muslim King of Sindh of Soomra dynasty (r: 1010–1351 AD).

BSF soldiers, who believe the goddess offers them divine protection in the harsh desert terrain, often visit the "mother's court" before going on duty. Legend states that during the India–Pakistan war of 1971, a detachment of Indian troops lost their way after entering Pakistani territory. After the commander prayed to Mata Nadeshwari, she is believed to have guided the soldiers safely back to their base camp using the light of a lamp. Hence, Mata Nadeshwari is regarded as a defender of the boundary, guardian of Indian warriors, and a source of strength for warriors. The original temple was built by the BSF after the 1971 war. Today, the temple's rituals are performed daily by a priest from the BSF alongside a priest from the temple trust.

=== Nadabet Wildlife ===
Nadabet Wildlife Sanctuary and the adjacent Nadabet Wetland are heaven for nature and bird watching with best time to visit being during the peak birding between October and March when the weather is pleasant and migratory activity is highest.

Nadabet Wildlife Sanctuary's arid terrain is a habitat for the endangered Indian Wild Ass, desert foxes, and wolves.

Nadabet Wetland, is often referred to as the "Heaven of Birds," is a seasonally flooded landscape within the Great Rann of Kutch that serves as a critical habitat for millions of migratory and native birds. While there is no standalone "Nadabet Wildlife Sanctuary," the region is ecologically part of the broader Wild Ass Sanctuary and Kutch Desert Sanctuary. The wetland hosts staggering numbers of migratory flamingos (with surveys recording over 429,000 Lesser Flamingos and 117,000 Greater Flamingos in early 2023), migratory pelicans (massive populations of Great White Pelicans (Rosy Pelicans) and Dalmatian Pelicans 7,000 recorded), and a 2023 survey recorded 144 different bird species, including waterbirds (Eurasian Spoonbills, Black-winged Stilts, and Little Cormorants), raptors (various species of eagles and hawks), with rare sightings of Egyptian Goose (a first for India).

== Transport ==
Nadabet, is reachable by road from Suigam (20 km east of Nadabet), Tharad (60 km northeast with interchange with NH-754A Amritsar–Jamnagar Expressway), and Ahmedabad (240 km east ), Nearest railway stations are at Tharad (60 km northeast) and Radhanpur (70 km east). Sardar Vallabhbhai Patel International Airport (AMD) at Ahmedabad is nearest airport with the scheduled commercial flights.

== See also ==
- Tourism in Gujarat
  - Rann Utsav festival 3-months long from December to February every year
- India-Pakistan Border Ceremonies
  - Hindumalkote border cerwmony
  - Tanot/Longewala border ceremony
