= Ranchordas Pagi =

Indian scout

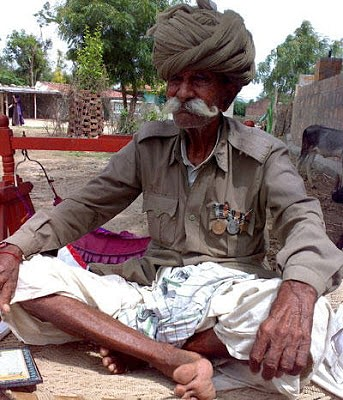
Ranchordas Rabari

Ranchordas Pagi (Ranchhod Rabari / Full Name - Ranchodbhai Savabhai Rabari) (09/09/1901 – 18/01/2013) worked as a scout on behalf of the Indian Army. His story is featured in the 2021 film Bhuj: The Pride of India where his character of an Indian Army Scout and R&AW agent is played by Sanjay Dutt.

== Early life ==
Pagi was born in a family of Pathapur Gathras or Pithapur village (now Pakistan), a village near India-Pakistan Border. He migrated to India after Partition of India in 1947.

== Pagi ==
Pagi means 'guide', the person who shows the way in the desert. Ranchoddas, the man in the picture, was affectionately called 'Pagi' by General Sam Manekshaw.

== Career ==
Ranchoddas Pagi's life changed when, aged 58, he was appointed a police guide by the Banaskantha Superintendent of Police, Vanraj Singh Jhala.

He was recruited by the Indian Army as a scout.

The Pakistani army captured many villages in the Kutch area just before the Indo-Pakistani War of 1965. Pagi went into the captured areas to gather information from both villagers and his own relatives. This greatly assisted the Indian army. In one of his most remarkable achievements, Ranchoddas Pagi traced the location of 1,200 enemy soldiers hiding in darkness. He also helped the Indian army capture several key posts during the 1965 and 1971 wars with Pakistan. His efforts during the wars of 1965 and 1971 reportedly saved thousands of Indian soldiers.

Manekshaw In His Last Times Kept Remembering This Old Man Called 'Pagi'. In 2008, Field Marshal Sam Manekshaw was admitted to Wellington Hospital, Tamil Nadu. He often kept taking a name 'Pagi-Pagi' during the days of his ill-health and semi-conscious state. The doctors asked one day, "Sir, who is this Paagi?"

This story is based on what Field Marshal Manekshaw himself narrated. In 1971, India had won the war. General Manekshaw was in Dhaka and ordered that Pagi be invited for dinner that day. A chopper was sent. While boarding the chopper, a bag belonging to Pagi remained left on the ground and the chopper was turned back to pick it up. The officers opened the bag before placing it in the helicopter as per the rules and were stunned because it had two Rotis, Onions and a dish of Gram Flour (Gathiya). One half of the meal was eaten by Sam Manekshaw and the other by Pagi for dinner.

After seeing the footprints of the camel, Pagi used to tell how many men are riding on it. By looking at the footprints of humans, he accurately guessed their weight, their age and how far they must have gone.

In the beginning of 1965 war, Pakistan Army captured Vidhkot in Kutch border in Gujarat. In this encounter, about 100 Indian soldiers were killed. A 10,000 men Indian Army contingent was mobilised and had to reach Chharkot in three days. The need for Ranchoddas Pagi was felt for the first time by the army. Ranchordas Pagi took work as a scout on behalf of the Indian Army.

Due to his grip on the desert paths, he guided the army to the destination 12 hours before the scheduled time. He was personally chosen by Sam Saheb to guide the army and a special post was created in the army, 'Pagi' i.e., the person with knowledge of feet.

Pagi reportedly found the location and approximate number of 1,200 hidden Pakistani soldiers based only on their footprints.

He reportedly also helped during war at Harami Nala at a channel of Sir Creek which heavily used by militant infiltrators and smugglers.

Along with the guidance of the army in the 1971 war, Pagi also helped get ammunition to the front. He played a vital role in India capturing the Pakistani town of Palinagar. Maneckshaw gave Pagi a cash prize of ₹300.

Field Marshal Sam Manekshaw died on 27 June 2008, and in 2009 aged 108 years, Pagi also took 'voluntary retirement' from the army. Pagi died in 2013 aged 112.

== Honours ==
He had been honoured by both the police and the Border Security Force (BSF). A border post of Suigam in Banaskantha district of Gujarat, at the international border region of North Gujarat was named 'Ranchhoddas Post' by BSF.

He received several awards including Sangram Medal, Police Medal and Samar Seva Star – for his role in the 1965 and 1971 wars. In 2007, he was congratulated by Narendra Modi, then chief minister of Gujarat, at the Independence Day celebration held in Palanpur.

This was the first time that an army post was named after a civilian. A bust of Pagi was also installed.
