= Bhabhar =

Bhabhar may refer to:

- Bhabar, the region south of the Lower Himalayas and the Sivalik Hills in India
- Bhabhar, Gujarat, a town in Vav-Tharad district, Gujarat, India
