= Vasant Bhatol =

Indian politician

MLA of Gujarat
- In office 2009–2012
- Preceded by: Mukesh Gadhvi
- Constituency: Danta

Personal details
- Party: Bhartiya Janata Party

Vasant Bhatol is a Member of Legislative assembly from Danta constituency in Gujarat for its 12th legislative assembly.
