= Akbarbhai Chavda =

Indian politician (born 1916)

Member of Parliament, Lok Sabha
- In office 1952–1962
- Succeeded by: Zohraben Chavda
- Constituency: Banaskantha, Gujarat

Personal details
- Born: 10 April 1916 Parantij, Sabarkantha, Gujarat, India
- Died: 21 January 1997 Sabarkantha, Gujarat, India
- Party: Indian National Congress
- Spouse: Zohraben Chavda

Akbarbhai Dalumiya Chavda (born 10 April 1916) was an Indian social worker, Gandhian and politician. He was elected to the 1st and 2nd Lok Sabha, the lower house of the Parliament of India from Banaskantha constituency in Gujarat. He was succeeded as an MP by his wife Zohraben, who was elected to the 3rd Lok Sabha in 1967.

== Life ==
Chavda started out with a job in the police department, but watching the Indian freedom struggle inspired him to join and fight for his country. Leaving his job, he became a follower of Mahatma Gandhi and contributed to the movement across the country, until finally in 1947 India became a free and independent country.

Post independence, while traveling in the tribal areas of Danta taluka in 1948-49, he witnessed firsthand, the lack of development - near zero literacy, the predominance of a hunter gatherer lifestyle and the apparent exploitation of the region by the local prince. He took it upon himself to help and started a small school in a hut with five children. His wife Zohraben was his steadfast partner in these endeavours.

== Political career ==
In 1952, Chavda was elected to the 1st Session of the Lok sabha as an MP from Banaskantha district. Despite his duties as a lawmaker, he maintained a close relationship with Sanali, opening an Ayurvedic clinic to tend to the health and welfare of the local tribal people. This was soon followed by the establishment of a primary school in the taluka.

Meanwhile, the government had announced the 1952 Sarvodaya Yojana, a Gandhian plan spearheaded by Jaiprakash Narayan that sought to address the fields of education, agriculture, village industry and health, focusing on improving the situation of India's most rural citizens.

He worked in the service of those who needed help, extolling his motto "labor, service, and simplicity". Averse to wealth, he wore simple clothes, didn't own a house and didn't seek financial gain. Chavda was respectfully known as the Gandhiji of Banaskantha, where he served as the District Congress President and as the Chairman of the District Education Committee.

His Ashram at Sanali still stands and continues his work of education and charity.

== Death ==
Akbarbhai Chavda died on 21 January 1997.
