= Kantibhai Kharadi =

Indian politician (born 1969)

Member of Gujarat Legislative Assembly
- Incumbent
- Assumed office 2012
- Preceded by: Vasant Bhatol
- Constituency: Danta

Personal details
- Born: 1 June 1969 (age 56)
- Party: Indian National Congress

Kantibhai Kalabhai Kharadi (born 1 June 1969) is an Indian politician from Gujarat and a member of the Gujarat Legislative Assembly from the Danta. He is associated with the Indian National Congress.
