= Popatlal Joshi =

Indian politician

Popatlal M Joshi

Member of Parliament, Lok Sabha
- In office 1971-1977
- Preceded by: S. K. Patil
- Succeeded by: Motibhai Chaudhary
- Constituency: Banaskantha, Gujarat

Personal details
- Born: Punabhai; 8 December 1917 Sarotra
- Died: 27 December 1999 PALANPUR
- Party: Indian National Congress
- Spouse: Taramati
- Children: Bharatkumar Popatlal Joshi Granddaughter Dr Bijal Joshi and Dr Birva Joshi Jones Great GrandChildren Rohan,Prem, and Tristan

Popatlal Mulshankerbhai Joshi (1917-1999) was an Indian politician. He was elected to the Lok Sabha, the lower house of the Parliament of India from Banaskantha, Gujarat.
