= Gumansinhji Vaghela =

Indian politician

Speaker of Gujarat Legislative Assembly
- In office November 1996 – April 1998
- Constituency: Deodar

MLA
- In office 1995–1998
- Constituency: Deodar

Gumansinhji Vaghela is the Titular King of Deodar State and was a leader of Bharatiya Janata party from Gujarat. He served as the Speaker of the Gujarat Legislative Assembly from 1996 to 1998. Vaghela was elected to the assembly from Deodar in Banaskantha district.
