= Anil Mali =

Indian politician

MLA in the Gujarat Legislative Assembly
- In office 2007–2012
- Constituency: Deodar

Personal details
- Party: Bhartiya Janata Party

Anil Mali is a Member of Legislative assembly from Deodar constituency in Gujarat for its 12th legislative assembly.
