= Chavda =

Chavda or Chavada may refer to:

- Chavda dynasty, a Gurjar dynasty of ancient India
- Chavda (surname), an Indian Gurjar surname
- Asda, British supermarket chain, nicknamed Chavda in some place due to the prominence of chavs there

== See also ==
- Chavdar (disambiguation)
- Chabria, an Indian surname
