= Govind Prajapati =

Indian politician

MLA of Gujarat
- In office 2007–2012
- Succeeded by: Maheshkumar Patel
- Constituency: Palanpur

Personal details
- Party: Bhartiya Janata Party

Govind Prajapati is a politician of Bharatiya Janata Party. He was a Member of Legislative assembly from Palanpur constituency in Gujarat for its 12th legislative assembly.
