= Jayantilal Shah =

Indian politician

Jayantilal virchand Shah

Member of Parliament, Lok Sabha
- In office 1989–1991
- Preceded by: B.K. Gadhvi
- Succeeded by: Harisinh Chavda
- Constituency: Banaskantha

Personal details
- Born: 25 December 1928 Vada, Banaskantha District
- Party: Samajwadi Janata Party (Rashtriya)
- Other political affiliations: Bharatiya Lok Dal; Janata Dal; Janata Party
- Spouse: Kantaben,
- Children: 2 sons and 3 daughters
- Education: Under Graduate

Jayantilal Virchand Shah is an Indian politician and was the member of 9th Lok Sabha from Banaskantha. He started his political career in 1967 when he was elected to Gujarat Legislative Assembly. He was Union Minister of State for Agriculture and Co-operation in Chandra Shekhar ministry.
