= Banaskantha Lok Sabha constituency =

Lok Sabha Constituency in Gujarat

Coordinates: 24.3°N 72.4°E

Banaskantha
- Lok Sabha constituency

Constituency details
- Country: India
- Region: Western India
- State: Gujarat
- Assembly constituencies: Vav; Tharad; Dhanera; Danta; Palanpur; Deesa; Deodar
- Established: 1952
- Total electors: 19,61,924 (2024)
- Reservation: None

Member of Parliament
- 18th Lok Sabha
- Incumbent Geniben Thakor
- Party: Indian National Congress
- Elected year: 2024

Banaskantha is one of the 26 Lok Sabha constituencies in Gujarat, state in western India.

== Vidhan Sabha segments ==
Presently, Banaskantha Lok Sabha constituency comprises seven Vidhan Sabha (legislative assembly) segments. These are:

| Constituency number | Name | Reserved for (SC/ST/None) | District | Party | 2024 Lead |
|---|---|---|---|---|---|
| 7 | Vav | None | Banaskantha | BJP | BJP |
| 8 | Tharad | None | Banaskantha | BJP | BJP |
| 9 | Dhanera | None | Banaskantha | IND | BJP |
| 10 | Danta | ST | Banaskantha | INC | INC |
| 12 | Palanpur | None | Banaskantha | BJP | INC |
| 13 | Deesa | None | Banaskantha | BJP | BJP |
| 14 | Deodar | None | Banaskantha | BJP | INC |

== Members of Parliament ==
| Year | Winner | Party |
|---|---|---|
| 1952 | Akbarbhai Chavda | Indian National Congress |
| 1957 | Akbarbhai Chavda | Indian National Congress |
| 1962 | Zohraben Chavda | Indian National Congress |
| 1967 | Manubhai Amersey | Swatantra Party |
| 1969^ | S. K. Patil | Indian National Congress (O) |
| 1971 | Popatlal Joshi | Indian National Congress |
| 1977 | Motibhai Chaudhary | Janata Party |
| 1980 | B.K. Gadhvi | Indian National Congress |
| 1984 | B.K. Gadhvi | Indian National Congress |
| 1989 | Jayantilal Shah | Janata Dal |
| 1991 | Harisinh Chavda | Bharatiya Janata Party |
| 1996 | B.K. Gadhvi | Indian National Congress |
| 1998 | Haribhai Parthibhai Chaudhary | Bharatiya Janata Party |
| 1999 | Haribhai Parthibhai Chaudhary | Bharatiya Janata Party |
| 2004 | Harisinh Chavda | Indian National Congress |
| 2009 | Mukeshkumar Bheiravdanji Gadhvi | Indian National Congress |
| 2013^ | Haribhai Parthibhai Chaudhary | Bharatiya Janata Party |
| 2014 | Haribhai Parthibhai Chaudhary | Bharatiya Janata Party |
| 2019 | Parbatbhai Patel | Bharatiya Janata Party |
| 2024 | Geniben Thakor | Indian National Congress |

^ by-poll

== Election results ==
=== 2024 ===
2024 Indian general election: Banaskantha
| Party | Candidate | Votes | % | ±% |
|---|---|---|---|---|
| INC | Geniben Thakor | 671,883 | 48.83 | ▲20.63 |
| BJP | Rekhaben Hiteshbhai Chaudhary | 6,41,477 | 46.62 | ▼15.00 |
| BSP | Mansungbhai Mashrubhai Parmar | 9,929 | 0.72 | |
| NOTA | None of the above | 22,167 | 1.61 | |
| Majority | | 30,406 | 2.21 | |
| Turnout | | 13,78,128 | 70.19 | |
| INC gain from BJP | | Swing | | |

=== 2019 ===
2019 Indian general elections: Banaskantha
| Party | Candidate | Votes | % | ±% |
|---|---|---|---|---|
| BJP | Parbatbhai Patel | 679,108 | 61.62 | +4.39 |
| INC | Parthibhai Galbabhai Bhatol | 3,10,812 | 28.20 | −6.23 |
| Independent | Thakor Swarupji Sardarji | 48,634 | 4.41 | N/A |
| NOTA | None of the Above | 12,728 | 1.15 | −0.81 |
| BSP | Tejabhai Nethibhai Rabari | 11,088 | 1.01 | |
| Majority | | 3,68,296 | 33.42 | +10.62 |
| Turnout | | 11,03,739 | 65.03 | +6.49 |
| BJP hold | | Swing | | |

=== General election 2014 ===
2014 Indian general elections: Banaskantha
| Party | Candidate | Votes | % | ±% |
|---|---|---|---|---|
| BJP | Haribhai Parthibhai Chaudhary | 5,07,856 | 57.23 | +3.02 |
| INC | Joitabhai Kasnabhai Patel | 3,05,522 | 34.43 | −7.11 |
| NOTA | None of the Above | 17,397 | 1.96 | −−− |
| BSP | Parsotamgiri Turantgiri Mahant | 11,175 | 1.26 | −−− |
| Independent | Babaji Thakor | 10,897 | 1.23 | −−− |
| Majority | | 2,02,334 | 22.80 | +10.13 |
| Turnout | | 8,87,336 | 58.54 | +19.81 |
| BJP hold | | Swing | +3.02 | |

==== Bye election 2013 ====
Bye-election, 2013: Banaskantha
| Party | Candidate | Votes | % | ±% |
|---|---|---|---|---|
| BJP | Haribhai Parthibhai Chaudhary | 3,07,988 | 54.21 | +11.02 |
| INC | Krishnaben Mukeshkumar Gadhvi | 2,36,011 | 41.54 | −3.24 |
| Independent | S. S. Bharmabhai | 7,706 | 1.36 | −−− |
| Independent | C. A. Nasirbhai | 6,188 | 1.06 | −−− |
| Independent | R. A. Rugjibhai | 3,255 | 0.57 | −−− |
| Margin of victory | | 71,977 | 12.67 | +11.08 |
| Turnout | | 5,68,276 | 38.74 | −11.09 |
| BJP gain from INC | | Swing | +9.43 | |

=== General election 2009 ===
2009 Indian general elections: Banaskantha
| Party | Candidate | Votes | % | ±% |
|---|---|---|---|---|
| INC | Mukeshkumar Bheiravdanji Gadhvi | 2,89,409 | 44.78 | |
| BJP | Haribhai Parthibhai Chaudhary | 2,79,108 | 43.19 | |
| Independent | Ashokbhai Balchandbhai Shrimali | 20,524 | 3.18 | |
| Independent | Aaiyubbhai Ibrahimbhai Sipai | 15,801 | 2.45 | |
| BSP | Chetanbhai Kalabhai Solanki | 11,867 | 1.84 | |
| Majority | | 10,154 | 1.59 | |
| Turnout | | 6,46,231 | 49.83 | |
| INC hold | | Swing | | |

=== General election 2004 ===
2004 Indian general elections: Banaskantha
| Party | Candidate | Votes | % | ±% |
|---|---|---|---|---|
| INC | Harisinh Chavda | 3,01,148 | 46.85 | |
| BJP | Haribhai Parthibhai Chaudhary | 2,94,220 | 45.77 | |
| Independent | Ashokbhai Balchandbhai Shrimali | 23,972 | 3.72 | |
| Independent | Bhopaji Majirana | 9,270 | 1.44 | |
| BSP | Babulal Vidaja | 8,258 | 1.28 | |
| Majority | | 6,928 | 1.08 | |
| Turnout | | 6,42,698 | 48.99 | |
| INC gain from BJP | | Swing | | |

=== General election 1952 ===
- Chavda Akbar Dalumiyan (INC) : 91,753 votes
- Mehta Gordhandas Girdharlal (SP) : 36,042

== See also ==
- Banaskantha district
- List of constituencies of the Lok Sabha
