= B. K. Gadhvi =

Indian politician (1937 – 2005)

President of Gujarat Pradesh Congress Committee
- In office 2004–2005
- Succeeded by: Bharatsinh Madhavsinh Solanki

Member of Parliament Lok Sabha
- In office 1996–1998
- Preceded by: Harisinh Chavda
- Succeeded by: Haribhai Parthibhai Chaudhary
- Constituency: Banaskantha
- In office 1980–1989
- Preceded by: Motibhai Chaudhary
- Succeeded by: Jayantilal Shah
- Constituency: Banaskantha

Union Minister of State for Finance in Government of India
- In office 1986–1989
- Prime Minister: Rajiv Gandhi

Personal details
- Born: 5 April 1937 Peshva, Sirohi, Rajasthan
- Died: 18 September 2005 (aged 68)
- Party: Indian National Congress
- Children: Mukesh Gadhvi

B. K. Gadhvi also known as Bhairavdanji K Gadhvi (5 April 1937 – 18 September 2005) was an Indian politician of Indian National Congress from Gujarat and a former member of Lok Sabha representing Banaskantha.

== Political career ==
He was a member of the Seventh, Eighth and Eleventh Lok Sabhas from 1980 to 1989 and from 1996 to 1998 representing the Banaskantha Parliamentary Constituency. He was also the Union Minister of State for Finance from 1986 to 1989. He has also served as the President of Gujarat Pradesh Congress Committee from 2004-2005. He also served as an MLA in Gujarat and also served as a Cabinet Minister in Gujarat Government.
