= Tharad Assembly constituency =

Legislative Assembly constituency in Gujarat State, India

Coordinates: 24.39°N 71.63°E

Tharad
- Constituency No. 8 for the Gujarat Legislative Assembly

Constituency details
- Country: India
- Region: Western India
- State: Gujarat
- District: Banaskantha district
- Lok Sabha constituency: Banaskantha
- Established: 2008
- Total electors: 248,450
- Reservation: None

Member of Legislative Assembly
- 15th Gujarat Legislative Assembly
- Incumbent Shankarbhai Lagdhirbhai Chaudhary
- Party: Bhartiya Janta Party
- Elected year: 2022

Tharad is one of the 182 Legislative Assembly constituencies of Gujarat state in India. It is part of Banaskantha district and comes under Banaskantha Lok Sabha constituency for national elections. It came into existence after 2008 delimitation.

== List of segments ==
This assembly seat represents the following segments,

1. Tharad Taluka
2. Lakahni Taluka part

== Members of Legislative Assembly ==
Year	Member	Party
2012	Parbatbhai Patel	Bharatiya Janata Party
2017	Parbatbhai Patel	Bharatiya Janata Party
2019 (by-poll)	Gulabsinh Pirabhai Rajput	Indian National Congress
2022	Shankarbhai Lagdhirbhai Chaudhary	Bharatiya Janata Party

== Election results ==
=== 2022 ===
Gujarat Assembly election, 2022: Tharad Assembly constituency
Party	Candidate	Votes	%	±%
BJP	Shankarbhai Chaudhary	1,17,891	54.27	
INC	Gulabsinh Rajput	91,385	42.07	
AAP	Virchandbhai Chavda	278	0.13	
NOTA	None of the above	3,466	1.6	
Majority			12.2	
Turnout				
Registered electors		248,208		
BJP gain from INC		Swing		

=== 2019 Bypoll ===
By-election, 2019: Tharad
Party	Candidate	Votes	%	±%
INC	Gulabsinh Pirabhai Rajput	73,000	48.55	
BJP	Jivraj Jagtabhai Patel	66,587	44.31	
NOTA	None of the above	3,583	2.38	
Majority		6,372	4.24	
Turnout		1,50,286	68.94	
INC gain from BJP		Swing		

=== 2017 ===
Gujarat Legislative Assembly Election, 2017: Tharad
Party	Candidate	Votes	%	±%
BJP	Parbatbhai Patel	69,789	38.75	−3.60
INC	Damraji Rajput	58,056	32.23	−7.97
Independent	Mavjibhai Patel	42,982	23.86	
NOTA	None of the above	2,725	1.51	
Majority		11,733	6.51	
Turnout		1,80,297	86.15	
BJP hold		Swing		

=== 2012 ===
2012 Gujarat Legislative Assembly election: Tharad
Party	Candidate	Votes	%	±%
BJP	Parbatbhai Patel	68,517	42.35	
INC	Mavjibhai Patel	65,044	40.20	
Independent	Shatibhai Jeradiya	14,074	8.70	
Independent	Bhagavanbhai Brahman	7,418	4.58	
Majority		3,473	2.15	
Turnout		161800	85.50	
BJP win (new seat)				

== See also ==
- List of constituencies of the Gujarat Legislative Assembly
- Banaskantha district
