= Vajubhai Vala =

Indian politician

Vajubhai Rudabhai Vala
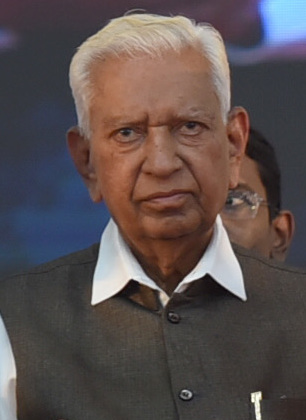

12th Governor of Karnataka
- In office 1 September 2014 – 10 July 2021
- Chief Minister: Siddaramaiah; H. D. Kumaraswamy; B. S. Yediyurappa
- Preceded by: Konijeti Rosaiah
- Succeeded by: Thawar Chand Gehlot

Speaker of the Gujarat Legislative Assembly
- In office 23 January 2012 – 31 August 2014; 26 December 2012 - 19 January 2013 (acting)
- Preceded by: Ganpat Vasava
- Succeeded by: Nimaben Acharya

Member of the Gujarat Legislative Assembly
- In office December 2002 – 31 August 2014
- Preceded by: Narendra Modi
- Succeeded by: Vijay Rupani
- In office July 1985 – February 2002
- Preceded by: Manibhai Ranpara
- Succeeded by: Narendra Modi
- Constituency: Rajkot West

Personal details
- Born: 23 January 1937 (age 89) Rajkot, Rajkot State, British India (present-day Gujarat, India)
- Party: Bharatiya Janata Party
- Spouse: Manoramabahen
- Children: 2 daughters, 2 sons
- Education: Bachelor of Science, Bachelor of Laws
- As of 31 August, 2014

Vajubhai Rudabhai Vala (born 23 January 1937) is an Indian statesman who was the 12th Governor of Karnataka from 1 September 2014 to 6 July 2021. He is also the longest-serving governor for Karnataka after Khurshed Alam Khan.

Vajubhai served as the Speaker of the Gujarat Legislative Assembly from 2012 to 2014. He is still a member of Bharatiya Janata Party. He served as a Cabinet Minister in the Government of Gujarat, holding various portfolios, such as finance, labour and employment, from 1997 to 2012. He was elected to Gujarat Legislative Assembly from Rajkot West constituency multiple times.

== Career ==
Vala started his political career at the Rashtriya Swayamsevak Sangh and subsequently joined Jan Sangh in 1971. He was jailed for eleven months during the emergency in 1975. He was the Mayor of Rajkot in the 1980s. Later he contested state assembly elections from Rajkot and served as the Cabinet Minister holding finance, revenue portfolios from 1998 to 2012. He was the finance minister for two terms. He holds the record of presenting budget in Gujarat Legislative Assembly; 18 times as the finance minister. He was elected as the Speaker of assembly in December 2012 and served till August 2014. He was appointed as the Governor of Karnataka in September 2014.

Vala has also been closely associated with Rajkot Nagarik Sahakari Bank, where he planned, organised and developed the banking service. He was also the Chairman of the bank for five years on-and-off during 1975-90 period.

== Controversy ==
Vala was involved in a controversy during the 2018 Karnataka Legislative Assembly elections. He invited the largest party, Bharatiya Janata Party to form the government and not the largest post poll alliance consisting of the Indian National Congress and the Janata Dal (Secular). He also gave the new Chief Minister BS Yeddyurappa 15 days to prove his majority in the house. His decision was vehemently opposed by all non-BJP alliance parties in the nation, and the INC approached the Supreme Court in this matter. Supreme court decreed that in case when no coalition/party has clear majority, the governor of the state has the legal power to decide who forms the government in that state. But, the same court shortened the 15 day time limit given by Vala to Yeddyurappa to prove majority, into just 3 days, and also mandated that the house proceeding including vote should be telecast live. Yeddyurappa resigned after the house convened, citing that he could not muster the majority. Kumaraswamy of Janata Dal was invited to become the new Chief Minister. However, 14 months later, Kumaraswamy's government collapsed. Later Yeddyurappa easily managed to sail through with 106 BJP MLAs.
