= Mangalbhai Patel =

Indian politician

Prof. Mangadbhai Madhavdas Patel (born 20 October 1951, Ahmedabad.; d. 15 November 2011) was Speaker of the Gujarat Legislative Assembly from December 2002 to January 2008. He belonged to the Bharatiya Janta Party.

== Biography ==
He was born on 7 September 1942 at Parbatpura, Taluka Mansa, Dist. Gandhinagar, and died on 15 November 2011,

He was Professor of Botany at Mansa Science College. He was a member of the tenth Gujarat Legislative Assembly during the year 1998 to 2011 during three consultative session in a row for the Mansa(84) seat He was member of Bharatiya Jan Sangh since 1966. He also served for vijapur taluka panchayat. He was a member of the senate at Gujarat University, North Gujarat University. He represented the Asia region at the Commonwealth Parliamentary Association, London, 2003. He has presented two research papers on the Mesocotyl in Botany.
