= Fatehali Palejwala =

Indian politician

Speaker of the Gujarat Assembly
- In office 1962–1967

Personal details
- Born: 6 June 1911
- Died: 30 September 1995 (aged 84)

Fatehali Palejwala (6 June 1911 – 30 September 1995) was an Indian politician who was the third Speaker of the Gujarat Legislative Assembly.

Palejwala was in office between 19 March 1962 and 17 March 1967. He was the second son of Huseinuddin Nuruddin Palejwala.
