= Govabhai Hamirabhai Rabari =

Indian politician from Gujarat (born 1954)

- Born: 1 June 1954 (age 70); Deesa, Banaskantha, India
- Occupation: Farming
- Children: 4
- Parent: Hamirabhai Rabari

Govabhai Hamirabhai Rabari is an Indian politician from the state of Gujarat. He was a former MLA in Deesa constituency from Gujarat. He belongs to Bharatiya Janata Party. Govabhai Rabari is a politician in North Gujarat. He is Gujarat Pradesh Congress Vice President of Gujarat.
