= Gulabsinh Pirabhai Rajput =

Indian politician

Member of the Gujarat Legislative Assembly
- In office 2019 – 2022
- Preceded by: Parbat Patel
- Constituency: Tharad

Personal details
- Born: Tharad, Gujarat, India
- Party: Indian National Congress
- Occupation: Business

Gulabsinh Pirabhai Rajput was a member of the Gujarat Legislative Assembly representing the Tharad constituency. He is a member of the Indian National Congress party. He was first elected as the MLA for Tharad in 2019. He was State President of Gujarat Youth Congress a part of Indian Youth Congress youth wing of Indian National Congress. He was the Congress Party candidate in the Vav Assembly by-election 2024.
