= Mukesh Gadhvi =

Indian politician

Member of parliament Lok Sabha
- In office 2009–2013
- Preceded by: Harisinh Chavda
- Succeeded by: Haribhai Parthibhai Chaudhary
- Constituency: Banaskantha

Member of the Gujarat Legislative Assembly
- In office 1998–2009
- Preceded by: Kantibhai Kachoriya
- Succeeded by: Kantibhai Kharadi
- Constituency: Danta

Mukesh Gadhvi (1 January 1963 – 1 March 2013) was an Indian politician and a senior member of Indian National Congress. He was a one-time Member of Parliament (MP) from Banaskantha and three-time Member of Legislative Assembly (MLA) from Danta. He was born in Jhanker Village Sirohi, Rajasthan, he was son of Congress leader B.K. Gadhvi, three time MP from the Banaskantha seat, and remained Union Minister of State for Finance during the Rajiv Gandhi ministry and had remained the President of Gujarat Pradesh Congress Committee (GPCC).

== Death ==
He died on 1 March 2013 at age 50, after suffering a brain stroke, a few days earlier. He is survived by his wife, one son and two daughters.
