= Desert fox =

Desert fox may refer to:

== Animals ==
- Fennec fox (Vulpes zerda), the world's smallest canid
- White-footed fox (Vulpes vulpes pusilla), also known as the desert fox

== Games ==
- Desert Fox, a 1976 video game for the Fairchild Channel F released as a part of Videocart-2
- Desert Fox (computer game), a 1985 game for the Commodore 64
- The Desert Fox, a 1981 board wargame published in Strategy & Tactics magazine

== Other uses ==
- Nickname of World War II German field marshal Erwin Rommel
- Rommel: The Desert Fox, a 1950 biography of Erwin Rommel by Desmond Young
- The Desert Fox: The Story of Rommel, a 1951 movie about Erwin Rommel
- The Desert Foxes, nickname for the Algeria national football team
- Operation Desert Fox, the 1998 bombing of Iraq by the United States and United Kingdom
- Nickname for US Major General Jarrett Robertson (1940–1993)
