= Danta Assembly constituency =

Legislative Assembly constituency in Gujarat State, India

Coordinates: 24.19°N 72.76°E

Danta
- Constituency No. 10 for the Gujarat Legislative Assembly

Constituency details
- Country: India
- Region: Western India
- State: Gujarat
- District: Banaskantha
- Lok Sabha constituency: Banaskantha
- Established: 1967
- Total electors: 257,978
- Reservation: ST

Member of Legislative Assembly
- 15th Gujarat Legislative Assembly
- Incumbent Kantibhai Kharadi
- Party: Indian National Congress
- Elected year: 2022

Danta is one of the 182 Legislative Assembly constituencies of Gujarat state in India. It is part of Banaskantha district .It is numbered as 10-Danta and is reserved for candidates belonging to the Scheduled Tribes.

== List of segments ==
This assembly seat represents the following segments,

1. Amirgadh Taluka
2. Danta Taluka

== Members of the Legislative Assembly ==
Year	Member	Party
1985	Baldevsinh D. Veghela	Indian National Congress
1990	Kachoriya Kantibhai Dharamdas	Bharatiya Janata Party
1995	Kachoriya Kantibhai Dharamdas	Bharatiya Janata Party
1998	Mukesh Gadhvi	Indian National Congress
2002	Mukesh Gadhvi	Indian National Congress
2007	Mukesh Gadhvi	Indian National Congress
2009^	Vasant Bhatol	Bharatiya Janata Party
2012	Kantibhai Kharadi	Indian National Congress
2017	Kantibhai Kharadi	Indian National Congress
2022	Kantibhai Kharadi	Indian National Congress

^: bypoll

== Election results ==
=== 2022 ===
Gujarat Assembly election, 2022:Danta Assembly constituency
Party	Candidate	Votes	%	±%
INC	Kharadi Kantibhai Kalabhai	85,134	46.42	
BJP	Parghi Latubhai Chandabhai	78,807	42.97	
AAP	Bumbadiya Mahendrabhai Kesharabhai	12,181	6.64	
NOTA	None of the above	5,213	2.84	
Majority		6,327	3.45	
Turnout				
Registered electors		257,655		

=== 2017 ===
Gujarat Assembly Election, 2017: Danta
Party	Candidate	Votes	%	±%
INC	Kantibhai Kharadi	86,129	52.88	+2.28
BJP	Maljibhai Kodarvi	61,477	37.74	+5.66
Majority			15.14	
Turnout		1,62,880	74.36	−0.59
INC gain from BJP		Swing		

=== 2012 ===
Gujarat Assembly Election, 2012
Party	Candidate	Votes	%	±%
INC	Kantibhai Kharadi	73,751	50.64	
BJP	Gamabhai Kharadi	46,761	32.11	
Independent	Mahendrabhai Bumbariya	12,432	8.54	
Independent	Somabhai Solanki	8,419	5.78	
Majority		26,990	18.53	
Turnout		145,647	74.90	
INC hold		Swing		

=== 2007 ===
Gujarat Assembly Election, 2007
Party	Candidate	Votes	%	±%
INC	Mukesh Gadhvi	74,895	54.64	
BJP	Javansinh Solanki	41,952	30.61	
Independent	Parthabhai Bumbariya	11,039	8.05	
BSP	Khimajibhai Balat	4,164	3.04	
Majority		32,943	24.03	
Turnout		137,061	60.72	
INC hold		Swing		

=== 2002 ===
Gujarat Assembly Election, 2002
Party	Candidate	Votes	%	±%
INC	Mukesh Gadhvi	82,545	61.14	
BJP	Hareshbhai Jani	52,455	38.86	
Majority		30,090	22.29	
Turnout		135,000	65.65	
INC hold		Swing		

=== 1998 ===
Gujarat Assembly Election, 1998
Party	Candidate	Votes	%	±%
INC	Mukesh Gadhvi	49,033	44.20	
BJP	Kantibhai Kachoriya	28,906	26.05	
Majority		20,127	18.14	
Turnout		117,809	68.41	
INC gain from BJP		Swing		

=== 1995 ===
Gujarat Assembly Election, 1995
Party	Candidate	Votes	%	±%
BJP	Kantibhai Kachoriya	59,705	47.50	
INC	Nurmahmadbhai Umatiya	48,016	38.20	
Majority		11,689	9.30	
Turnout		131,378	76.88	
BJP gain from INC		Swing		

=== 1990 ===
Gujarat Assembly Election, 1990
Party	Candidate	Votes	%	±%
BJP	Kantibhai Kachoriya	29,774	37.66	
JD	Narpatsinh Chawda	21,638	30.61	
Majority		8,136	10.29	
Turnout		81,047	55.05	
BJP gain from JD		Swing		

=== 1985 ===
Gujarat Assembly Election, 1985
Party	Candidate	Votes	%	±%
INC	Baldevsinh Vaghela	26,438	57.16	
JP	Ibrahim Habibbhai	18,772	40.59	
Majority		7,666	16.58	
Turnout		81,047	55.05	
INC gain from JP		Swing		

=== 1980 ===
Gujarat Assembly Election, 1980
Party	Candidate	Votes	%	±%
JP	Harisinh Chavda	22703	50.16	
INC	Abdulrehman Memon	22,557	49.84	
Majority		8,136	10.29	
Turnout		81,047	55.05	
BJP gain from JD		Swing		

=== 1975 ===
Gujarat Assembly Election, 1975
Party	Candidate	Votes	%	±%
INC(O)	Harisinh Chavda	17,148	45.79	
INC	Bhairavdan Gadhavi	12,284	32.80	
Majority		4,864	12.99	
Turnout		40,508	49.52	
INC(O) gain from INC		Swing		

== See also ==
- List of constituencies of the Gujarat Legislative Assembly
- Banaskantha district
