= Deesa Assembly constituency =

Legislative Assembly constituency in Gujarat State, India

Coordinates: 24.26°N 72.19°E

Deesa
- Constituency No. 13 for the Gujarat Legislative Assembly

Constituency details
- Country: India
- Region: Western India
- State: Gujarat
- District: Banaskantha
- Lok Sabha constituency: Banaskantha
- Total electors: 289,681
- Reservation: None

Member of Legislative Assembly
- 15th Gujarat Legislative Assembly
- Incumbent Pravin Gordhanji Mali
- Party: Bharatiya Janata Party
- Elected year: 2022

Deesa is one of the 182 Legislative Assembly constituencies of Gujarat state in India. It is part of Banaskantha district. It is numbered as 13-Deesa.

== List of segments ==
This assembly seat represents the following segments,

1. Deesa Taluka (Part) Villages – Sunthiya, Chora, Ramun, Dhanavada, Bural, Kuchavada, Viruna, Vithodar, Bhachalva, Tetoda, Ramsan, Nagafana, Kochasana, Javal, Talegadh, Robas Nani, Robas Moti, Fagudra, Agdol, Sodapur, Meda, Kotha, Ghada, Dhanpura, Talepura, Thervada, Jherda, Pamaru, Gugal, Varan, Sherpura, Kunvara Padar, Kasari, Baiwada, Morthal Golia, Genaji rabari Golia, Chandaji Golia, Bhadath, Chatrala, Latiya, Vasada, Davas, Shamsherpura, Yavarpura, Laxmipura, Dama, Jorapura, Akhol Nani, Akhol Moti, Mahadeviya, Vadli Farm, Ranpur Athamno Vas, Ranpur Vachlovas, Ranpur Ugamno Vas, Kant, Rajpur, Sherganj, Kumpat, Malgadh, Dhedhal, Rampura, Odhava, Dedol, Lorvada, Vadaval, Juna Deesa, Bhoyan, Rasana Nana, Rasana Mota, Dhuva, Dharpada, Fatepura, Vasna (Juna Deesa), Sanath, Sandiya, Sotambla, Khentva, Vahara, Viruvada, Dasanavas, Deesa (M).

== Members of Legislative Assembly ==
Year	Member	Picture	Party
2007	Liladhar Vaghela		Bharatiya Janata Party
2012	Liladhar Vaghela		Bharatiya Janata Party
2017	Pandya Shashikant Mahobatram		Bharatiya Janata Party
2022	Pravinkumar Gordhanji Mali		Bharatiya Janata Party

== Election candidate ==
=== 2022 ===
Gujarat Assembly election, 2022:Deesa Assembly constituency
Party	Candidate	Votes	%	±%
AAP	Ramesh Patel			
Registered electors				

== Election results ==
=== 2017 ===
Gujarat Assembly Election, 2017: Deesa
Party	Candidate	Votes	%	±%
BJP	Shashikant Pandya	85,411	47.51	
INC	Govabhai Hamirabhai Rabari	70,880	39.42	
IND	Bahadursinh Vaghela	15,912	8.85	
Majority			8.09	
Turnout		179,787	71.68	
Registered electors		250,833		
BJP hold		Swing		

=== 2012 ===
Gujarat Assembly Election, 2012
Party	Candidate	Votes	%	±%
BJP	Liladhar Vaghela	66,294	42.56	
INC	Rajendrakumar Joshi	48,588	31.19	
Independent	Mangalji Mali	21,148	13.58	
Majority			11.37	
Turnout		155,810	70.26	
BJP hold		Swing		

=== 2007 ===
Gujarat Assembly Election, 2007
Party	Candidate	Votes	%	±%
BJP	Liladhar Vaghela	72,064	52	
INC	Govabhai Hamirabhai Rabari	53,442	38.56	
Majority			13.44	
Turnout		138,586		
BJP hold		Swing		

== See also ==
- List of constituencies of the Gujarat Legislative Assembly
- Banaskantha district
