= Jagana =

- village
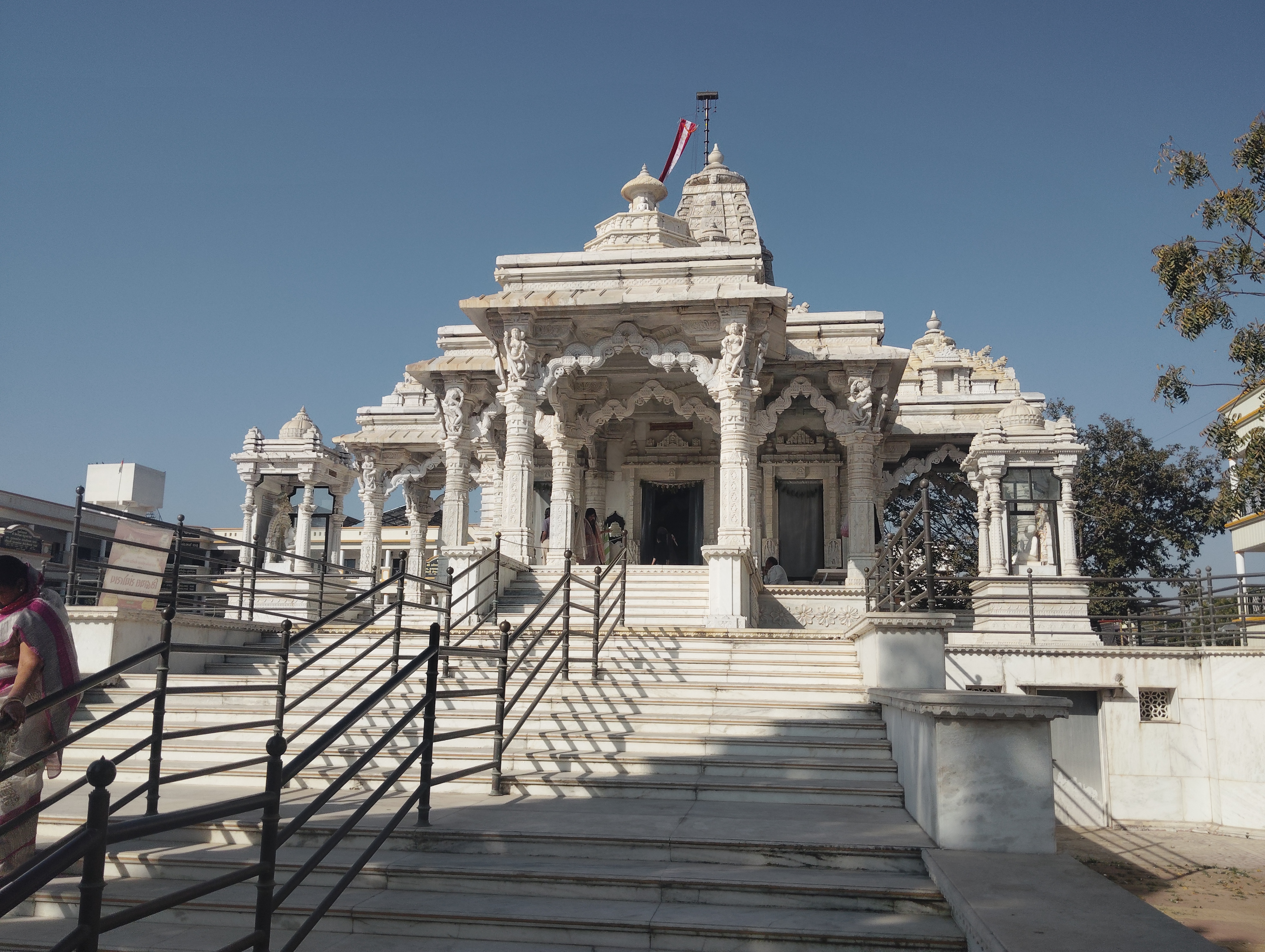
- Bhagyabhumi Parshwadham Jain Temple in Jagana
- Nickname: જગાણા
- Location in Gujarat, India Jagana (India)
- Coordinates: 24°07′28.6″N 72°25′06.2″E
- Country: India
- State: Gujarat
- District: Banaskantha

Languages
  - Official: Gujarati, Hindi
- Time zone: UTC+5:30 (IST)
- PIN: 385001
- Telephone code: 02742-xxxxxx
- Website: gujaratindia.com

Jagana is a village in the Palanpur taluka of Banaskantha district in northern Gujarat, India. The villages Vasna, Bhagal, Sedrasana are located near to Jagana and it is just 6 km away from the district headquarters, Palanpur.

== About ==
Jagana is located at an altitude of 252m (830 feet) at 24°7'30 N, 72°25'15 E. It is believed to be founded by Jagdev whose brother Pal Parmar founded Palanpur.

Jagana has many educational institutes like Government Engineering College, Palanpur, which is one of the major engineering colleges in the nearby region, Srimati S K Mehta High School, Government Primary School. There are many temples in the village such as Guru Maharaj Mandir, Verai Mata Mandir, Shiv Mandir, Maha Gauri Mata Mandir and Hanuman Mandir. Bhagyabhumi Nabhashchandra Parshwadham, a Jain Derasar, is also located near Jagana. There are also many temples in the nearby town Palanpur and the religious sites such as Balaram Mahadev Temple and Ambaji located in the same district are reachable from Palanpur bus stand. There is a branch of BANK OF BARODA in the village. The village falls in the Vadgam Assembly constituency and Patan Parliamentary constituency.

== Transport ==
=== Road ===
The road connecting Jagana to Palanpur was built in 1873–74. Jagana is connected to Palanpur by Gobri Road and Gujarat state highway 41 (SH41) which also connects it directly to Mehsana, Unjha and Ahmedabad.

=== Rail ===
Umardashi railway station is the nearest railway station located in Sedrasana village which is 5 km away. Palanpur junction, a major railway station on the Jaipur–Ahmedabad line is located 7 km away.

=== Airport ===
The nearest Airport is Deesa Airport, originally built to serve the princely state of Palanpur is located 35 km from Jagana. The nearest International Airport is Sardar Vallabhbhai Patel International Airport, Ahmedabad, which is at a distance of 135 km from the village.
