= Palanpur Assembly constituency =

Legislative Assembly constituency in Gujarat State, India

Coordinates: 24.17°N 72.43°E

Palanpur
- Constituency No. 12 for the Gujarat Legislative Assembly

Constituency details
- Country: India
- Region: Western India
- State: Gujarat
- District: Banaskantha
- Lok Sabha constituency: Banaskantha
- Established: 2007
- Total electors: 284,390
- Reservation: None

Member of Legislative Assembly
- 15th Gujarat Legislative Assembly
- Incumbent Aniket Girishbhai Thaker
- Party: Bharatiya Janata Party
- Elected year: 2022

Palanpur is one of the 182 Legislative Assembly constituencies of Gujarat state in India. It is part of Banaskantha district. It is numbered as 12-Palanpur.

== List of segments ==
This assembly seat represents the following segments,

1. Palanpur Taluka (Part) Villages – Gadalwada(Galwada), Surajpura, Ranawas, Juvol, Chekhala, Rampura (Karaza), Bhatamal Nani, Akedi, Badarpura (Bhutedi), Vadhana, Madana (Dangiya), Kotda (Bhakhar), Mota, Chandisar, Kushakal, Delwada, Rajpur (Pakhanva), Bhutedi, Sangla, Bhatamal Moti, Antroli, Pirojpura (Tankani), Kotda (Chand Gadh), Chitrasani, Ranpuriya, Ukarda, Malpuriya, Jaspuriya, Hebatpur, Malana, Pakhanwa, Moriya, Lunwa, Varwadia, Khemana, Sangra, Laxmanpura, Hasanpur, Merwada (Mahajan), Pedagara, Malan, Vasda (Fatepur), Manpur (Karjoda), Asmapura (Karjoda), Karjoda, Songadh, Parpada, Angola, Badarpura (Parpada), Badarpura (Khodla), Khodla, Kumbhalmer, Sundha, Samdhi Ranajivas, Samdhi (Motavas), Samdhi (Nadhanivas), Vasani, Kumbhasan, Vedancha, Akesan, Chadotar, Sadarpur, Aligadh, Vasda (Mujpur), Nalasar, Ambaliyal, Jadial, Bhatwadi, Vasan, Bhagal (Pipli), Dhaniyana, Ambetha, Virpur, Ratanpur, Gathaman, Bhavisana, Salempura, Gadh, Talepura (Madana), Dalwada, Madana (Gadh), Esbipura, Lalawada, Sambarda, Pipli, Gopalpura, Ruppura, Palanpur (M), Palanpur (Rural).

== Members of Legislative Assembly ==
Year	Member	Party
2007	Govind Prajapati	Bharatiya Janata Party
2012	Maheshkumar Patel	Indian National Congress
2017	Maheshkumar Patel	Indian National Congress
2022	Aniket Girishbhai Thakar	Bharatiya Janata Party

== Election results ==
=== 2022 ===
2022 Gujarat Legislative Assembly election: Palanpur
Party	Candidate	Votes	%	±%
BJP	Aniket Thakar	95,588	52.93	
INC	Maheshkumar Amrutlal Patel	68,608	37.99	
AAP	Rameshbhai Nabhani	9,606	5.32	
NOTA	None of the above	2,702	1.5	
Majority		26,980	14.94	
Turnout				
Registered electors		284,390		
BJP gain from INC		Swing		

=== 2017 ===
2017 Gujarat Legislative Assembly election: Palanpur
Party	Candidate	Votes	%	±%
INC	Maheshkumar Patel	91,512	52.10	
BJP	Laljibhai Prajapati	73,919	42.08	
Majority		17,593	10.02	
Turnout		1,75,661	69.86	
INC hold		Swing		

== See also ==
- List of constituencies of the Gujarat Legislative Assembly
- Banaskantha district
