= Kundanlal Dholakia =

Indian politician

Kundanlal Dholakia (10 August 1920 – 8 March 2011) was a politician from Gujarat. He was born in Calcutta to Jashwantray and Jiviben. He started his career as lawyer and was president of Kutch District Bar Association for year 1965–66. He married Harsuta. He was member of erstwhile Bombay Assembly from 1957 to 1960 and Gujarat Assembly from 1960 to 1962 as a member of pre-Indira Congress party from Bhuj. In 1962 elections as candidate of Congress from Bhuj, he lost to independent candidate Gulabshankar Amritlal. After split of Congress in 1969 he became associated with Indian National Congress (Organisation) and was elected as a member of Gujarat Legislative Assembly for 1975-80 again from Bhuj. He was the speaker of Gujarat Assembly from June 1975 to March 1977 and then from April 1977 to June 1980. He worked actively during the earthquake and drought in Kutch during 1956. In 2009, he was awarded Gujarat Pratibha Award. His other major contribution was as a historian, he penned down history of Kutch in books - ‘Shruti ane Smruti: Kutch’ and ‘Kutch na antarango’ both wonderful books on Kutch's recent history. His major contribution to contemporary history of Gujarat was his book ‘Samayne sathvare Gujarat.’ This is most probably the only book that narrates Gujarat's political history between 1952 and 2009 in continuing chapters. Dholakia's book was first published in 1991. Though, Dholakia was from Congress party, he didn't rescue himself from writing something against Congress Chief Ministers of Gujarat while penning down contemporary history. After every few years he would add other chapters on recent political affairs. Thus the subsequent editions with added chapters were published in 1994, 2005 and finally in 2010. One has to take note that as a historian, he was active right till his death at age of 90 in 2011 and his last writings were published just a year before in 2010.
