= Aniket Thakar =

Indian politician

Aniket Girishbhai Thakar (born 1971) is an Indian politician from Gujarat. He is a member of the Gujarat Legislative Assembly from Palanpur Assembly constituency in Banaskantha district. He won the 2022 Gujarat Legislative Assembly election representing Bharatiya Janata Party.

== Early life and education ==
Thakar is from Palanpur, Banaskantha district, Gujarat. He is the son of Girishbhai Thaker. He completed his B.Com. in 1991 at a college affiliated with Hemchandracharya North Gujarat University, Patan. He is a businessman while his wife is a private employee.

== Career ==
Thakar won from Palanpur Assembly constituency representing Bharatiya Janata Party in the 2022 Gujarat Legislative Assembly election. He polled 95.588 votes and defeated his nearest rival, Mahesh Patel of the Indian National Congress, by a margin of 26,980 votes. He garnered a vote share of 52.93 per cent against 37.99 by his opponent Patel.
