= Swarupji Thakor =

Indian politician

Member of Gujarat Legislative Assembly
- Incumbent
- Assumed office 2024
- Preceded by: Geniben Thakor
- Constituency: Vav

Minister of State, Government of Gujarat
- Incumbent
- Assumed office 17 October 2025

Personal details
- Party: Bharatiya Janata Party
- Profession: Politician

Swarupji Thakor is an Indian politician from Gujarat. He is a member of the Gujarat Legislative Assembly since 2024, representing Vav Assembly constituency as a member of the Bharatiya Janata Party.

He is Minister of State, Khadi, Cottage and Rural Industries in Government of Gujarat.

== See also ==
- List of chief ministers of Gujarat
- Gujarat Legislative Assembly
