= Harisinh Pratapsinh Chavda =

Indian politician (1930–2013)

Member of Parliament, Lok Sabha
- In office 2004 — 2009
- Preceded by: Haribhai Parthibhai Chaudhary
- Succeeded by: Mukesh Gadhvi
- Constituency: Banaskantha
- In office 1991 — 1996
- Preceded by: Jayantilal Shah
- Succeeded by: B. K. Gadhvi
- Constituency: Banaskantha

Personal details
- Born: 30 October 1930 Gandhinagar, Gujarat
- Died: 29 June 2013 (aged 82)
- Party: Indian National Congress
- Spouse: Smt. Pushpaben
- Children: 2 sons and 2 daughters
- As of 25 February, 2006

Harisinh Pratapsinh Chavda (30 October 1930 – 29 June 2013) was a member of the 14th Lok Sabha of India. He represented the Banaskantha constituency of Gujarat and is a member of the Indian National Congress.

== A brief introduction ==
- He was born in the village called Ambod, Dist. Gandhinagar, Gujarat, India on 30 October 1930.
- His high school education was at Killol – Patan, Gujarat, India.
- He was a Member, Gujarat Legislative Assembly for two terms between 1975 and 1985.
- He was a cabinet minister, Government of Gujarat from 1975 to 1980.
- He was a member of Indian Parliament from 1991 to 1995.
- He is also a sitting member in 14th parliament since 2004.
- He is a Member of Indian National Committee on Human Resource Development.
- He is widely travelled and has visited Austria, Belgium, Canada, France, Germany, Italy, Netherlands, Switzerland, U.K, and U.S.A.

== Founder ==
Lokniketan and from this platform, started three colleges ten High Schools, five ashram shalas, eight hostels, kindergartens,

Founded "Nootan Bharati" Institute at Taluka Palanpur then handed over its management to the local people. Started Thakkarbapa and Sarvajanik Chhatralaya at Palanpur.
