= Suigam =

Town in Gujarat, India

Coordinates: 24.1548199°N 71.3498496°E

Suigam is a village in Suigam Taluka of Maratha Riyasat in Gujarat, India, but it is now a Taluka of Vav-Tharad District in Gujarat.

== History ==
Lord Krishna's descendant Devaraj. Who many years ago came from Savalkhi in the province of Sindh to the edge of Kutch and became Vija Apa son of Devaraj, Jetsi Apa son of Vija Apa, Jetsi Apa son became Soya Apa. This Soya Apa was inhabited by a village named Soygam, the same Soygam is today's Suigam and even today there is a temple of Sri Shakti Mata, the goddess of the Soya Apa. And the descendants of Sabar Apa(son of Soya Aapa)are today's Sindhav Bharvad. Of which 16 branches are Japada(Bharvad), Siyar(Bharvad), Vachia(Bharvad),

etc...

== Geography ==
It is situated on a small hill six miles from the Rann of Kutch. It is the starting point of one of the routes across the Ran to Parkar.
