= Keshaji Chauhan =

Indian politician

Member of Gujarat Legislative Assembly
- Incumbent
- Assumed office 2022
- Constituency: Deodar constituency

Personal details
- Born: Keshaji Shivaji Chauhan
- Party: Bharatiya Janata Party
- Education: Graduate Professional
- Occupation: Farmer and business

Keshaji Chauhan (born 1 June 1962) is an Indian politician and a member of the Bharatiya Janata Party (BJP). He contested the Deodar constituency in the 2017 elections and was the runner-up candidate. Chauhan also holds the position of president of the Sant Sadaram Kelavani Trust, which is based in Deodar. He is in charge of the Samast Thakor Samaj Samuh Lagna Samiti in Deodar-Bhabhar and has previously served as the vice president of the Banaskantha District BJP.
