= Bhabhar, Gujarat =

Town in Gujarat state, India

- Town
- Location in Gujarat, India
- Coordinates: 24.0718371°N 71.5892314°E
- Country: India
- State: Gujarat
- District: Banaskantha
- Established: 1742
- Founder: Thakor Hathiji of Kankrej

Government
  - Type: Municipality
- Time zone: UTC+5:30 (IST)

Bhabhar is a town in the Vav-Tharad district of Gujarat, India.

== History ==
Bhabhar, was held by Koli Thakor, has a history closely like that of the Kankrej estates. Originally part of the Tervada district, it was taken in farm by thakor Hathiji of Kankrej, who in 1742, took advantage of the prevailing anarchy, to establish the village of Bhabhar, and by degrees to gain possession of the deserted lands of Tervada. During British period, under two nominal chiefs, the village lands were parcelled among a large body of cadets, bhayad.

Bhabhar entered into agreements with the British Government in 1820. It was under Palanpur Agency of Bombay Presidency, which in 1925 became the Banas Kantha Agency. After Independence of India in 1947, Bombay Presidency was reorganized in Bombay State. When Gujarat state was formed in 1960 from Bombay State, it fell under Banaskantha district of Gujarat.
