= Geni Thakor =

Indian politician

Geniben Thakor

Member of Parliament, Lok Sabha
- Incumbent
- Assumed office 4 June 2024
- Preceded by: Parbatbhai Patel
- Constituency: Banaskantha

Member of the Gujarat Legislative Assembly
- In office 14 December 2017 – 4 June 2024
- Preceded by: Shankar Chaudhary
- Succeeded by: Swarupji Thakor
- Constituency: Vav

Personal details
- Born: 19 November 1975 (age 50)
- Party: Indian National Congress
- Spouse: Nagaji Thakor
- Profession: Social Worker
- As of 18 November, 2022

Geniben Nagajibhai Thakor is an Indian politician and was member of the legislative assembly of Gujarat legislative assembly elected from Vav assembly constituency. She contested 2017 Gujarat legislative assembly election from Indian National Congress and won against Shankar Chaudhary of Bharatiya Janata Party. She won the 2024 Indian Lok Sabha Elections from Banaskantha constituency, being the only Indian National Congress candidate from Gujarat.

== Political career ==
Thakor contested 2012 Gujarat legislative assembly election from Vav but lost. She contested 2017 Gujarat legislative assembly election from Vav constituency and won with margin of 6655 votes. Thakor is considered a close-aide of Alpesh Thakor by media sources. She was elected again from Vav in 2022 Gujarat Legislative Assembly election.

Thakor participated in protests during the 2026 Budget Session of the Lok Sabha, where members entered the vale and displayed placards and surrounded the front benches, including the area of the Prime Minister's seat, resulting in adjournment of proceedings.

== Views ==
In 2019, Geni Thakor supported the decision of Thakor community to ban use of mobile phones for unmarried girls of community. Thakor said that nothing was wrong in move to ban mobile for girls and "they should stay away from technology and spend more time in studying". Previously, in 2018, she provoked people to burn the rape accused instead of handing them to police. Later, she clarified that she was trying 'to calm down women'.

In 2023, while being a Congress MLA, Geniben Thakor, along with Fatesinh Chauhan, a BJP MLA, demanded an amendment to the Registration of Marriages Act, 2009, to make signatures of the parents mandatory when adult children choose their own partners. She said that she is against the love marriages that are without parental consent and added that such marriages must also be registered in the same taluka where the man or woman live.
