= S. K. Patil =

Indian politician

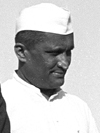

Minister of Railways
- Preceded by: H. C. Dasappa
- Succeeded by: Cheppudira Muthana Poonacha

Member of Parliament, Lok Sabha
- In office 1952–1967
- Succeeded by: George Fernandes
- Constituency: Mumbai South
- In office June 1964 – 12 March 1967

Personal details
- Born: 14 August 1898 Zarap, Kudal Taluka, Sindhudurg district, Bombay Presidency
- Died: 24 May 1981 (aged 82)
- Children: 7 Children including Jagdish Patil, Renowned Urologist in Corbin, KY
- As of 17 September, 2006

Sadashiv Kanoji Patil (abbreviated as S. K. Patil) (1898–1981) was a former INC leader from Maharashtra. A veteran freedom fighter, he was a qualified journalist, scholar and orator. He was thrice elected mayor of Bombay and was known as "the uncrowned king of Bombay". He supported, assisted and nurtured a number of institutions, particularly in Mumbai and enriched the city culturally.

== Early life ==
He was born in 1898 in the village of Zarap between Kudal and Sawantwadi. His father was a police officer in Kolhapur State. He studied law in Pune, then migrated to Mumbai at the age of 23 in 1921 to join the chambers of barrister Velingkar. He started his own law practice in 1929 and practised primarily in the small causes court and the city civil court, and a few civil appeal cases on the appellate side of the Bombay High Court. He was briefed to appear with Muhammad Ali Jinnah in a few criminal cases in the early 1930s. By the end of his active practice in the mid 1940s, he came to be known as a forceful pleader in first appeals before the high court. He was frequently briefed to appear before various district courts in Bombay Presidency.

== Career ==
He was the Member of Parliament from Mumbai when it was part of the unified Bombay State. He was a union minister during the time of Jawaharlal Nehru, Lal Bahadur Shastri and Indira Gandhi. From 1964 to 1967 he was the union minister for railways. Though a three-time MP, he was defeated by George Fernandes in Mumbai South Lok Sabha constituency in 1967 for 4th Lok Sabha. He then fought a by-poll from Banaskantha Lok Sabha constituency in Gujarat and rejoined Lok Sabha. In 1969, during the split in the Indian National Congress, he along with Morarji Desai and S. Nijalingappa became the leading lights of the Congress (O) faction. He contested from Banaskantha Lok Sabha constituency in 1971 on Congress (O) ticket but lost to the Congress (R) candidate.

In the Lok Sabha discussions on the report of the States Reorganisation Commission, on 15 November 1955, Patil demanded that the Mumbai be constituted as an autonomous city-state, laying great stress on its cosmopolitan character. He had said in a meeting that Maharashtra will not get Mumbai in 5000 years. However, within mere five years Bombay state was partitioned into the present day states of Gujarat and Maharashtra in 1960, and the city of Mumbai became the capital of Maharashtra.
