= Zohraben Chavda =

Member of the 3rd Lok Sabha
- In office 1962–1967
- Constituency: Banaskantha

Personal details
- Born: 2 September 1923 Prantij, British Raj
- Died: 1997 (aged 73–74)
- Party: Indian National Congress

Zohraben Akbarbhai Chavda (1923–1997) was a Gandhian social reformer and member of the 3rd Lok Sabha from Banaskantha.

== Early life ==
Chavda was born on 2 September 1923 in Prantij town of Gujarat to Jamiyatkhan Ummarkhan Pathan and his wife. She did her nursing training course from Wardha.

== Career ==
After completing her training, Chavda began working as a nurse in Gujarat Vidyapith and later shifted to Mahatma Gandhi's Sabarmati Ashram. On the advice of Gandhi, she and her husband went to Sanali village with the motive of improving the condition of underprivileged. Here they established an ashram and taught the children in ashramshala. She served as the President of the Congress Committee in Banaskantha district and the Chairman of her district's Social Welfare Project.

During the 1962 Indian general election for the 3rd Lok Sabha, Chavda stood and won from Banaskantha on the ticket of Indian National Congress, polling 1,15,931 votes while her nearest rival, a candidate of Swatantra Party secured 60,975. She and Maimoona Sultan were the only two Muslim women in the 3rd Lok Sabha.

== Personal life ==
Chavda married fellow Gandhian Akbarbhai Dalumiyan Chavda at Gujarat Vidyapith in 1946. She died in 1997 and Akbarbhai followed her the next year.
