= Parbatbhai Patel =

Indian politician from Gujarat state

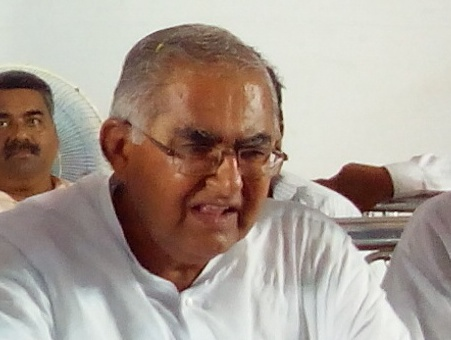

Member of Parliament, Lok Sabha
- In office 23 May 2019 – 4 June 2024
- Preceded by: Haribhai Parthibhai Chaudhary
- Succeeded by: Geni Thakor
- Constituency: Banaskantha

Minister of State Water Resources (Independent Charge), Water Supply, Government of Gujarat
- In office 4 January 2008 – 25 December 2012

MLA of Gujarat
- In office 2012–2017
- Constituency: Tharad

MLA of Gujarat
- In office 2007–2012
- Constituency: Vav

MLA of Gujarat
- In office 1985–1990
- Constituency: Vav (Vidhan Sabha Constituency) Vav

Personal details
- Born: 4 September 1948 (age 78) Bhachar, Taluka Tharad, Banaskantha
- Party: Bharatiya Janata Party
- Spouse: Anjubahen
- Children: 2 Sons
- Education: Gujarat University
- Profession: Farming And Social Work

Parbatbhai Patel is a Gujarati politician who served as a Member of Parliament, Lok Sabha from Banaskantha constituency in Gujarat in the 17th Lok Sabha.

He was elected to the Lok Sabha, lower house of the Parliament of India from Banaskantha, Gujarat in the 2019 Indian general election as member of the Bharatiya Janata Party.
