= Reshma =

Reshma or Resham is a given name and a surname, derived from Persian and meaning silken, and may refer to:

== Known by given name only ==
- Resham, Pakistani film and television actress
- Reshma (singer), Pakistani folk singer
- Reshma (Tamil actress), Indian film actress
- Reshma (Malayalam actress), Indian B-grade film actress
- Reshma of Kashmir (1950–2022), transgender singer and activist from Srinagar, Kashmir

== Given name ==
- Reshma Bhandari, Nepali volleyball player
- Reshma Bombaywala, Indian model, jewellery designer, and actress
- Reshma Gandhi, Indian cricketer
- Resham Lal Chaudhary, Nepali politician
- Reshamlal Jangade, Indian politician
- Reshma Mane, Indian wrestler
- Reshma Nilofer Naha, Indian maritime pilot
- Reshma Pasupuleti, Indian film and television actress
- Reshma Patel, Indian politician
- Reshma Pathan, Indian stuntwoman
- Reshma Qureshi, Indian model, vlogger, and activist
- Reshma Rajan, Indian film actress
- Reshma Rathore, Indian actress and model
- Reshma Saujani, Indian-American lawyer and politician
- Reshma Shetty, British-American television and film actress of Indian origin
- Resham Singh Baines, Indian-Kenyan hockey player
- Reshma Thomas, Indian social worker
- Reshma Valliappan, Indian-Malaysian activist

== Surname ==
- Jahura Akhter Reshma, Bangladeshi weightlifter

== See also ==
- Reshma (air base), former Soviet air base
