= Vaghela (surname) =

Vaghela, sometimes spelled Baghela, is an Indian Gujarati surname. It is commonly found in the Chamar, Mochi, and Vadi caste groups.

== Origin ==
According to the Oxford Dictionary of American Family Names (Vaghela) it derives from the Vyaghreshvari temple in Atkot.

== Surname list ==
Notable individuals with the surname include:

- Darshna Vaghela, Indian politician
- Neelu Vaghela (born 1970), Indian actress
- Shankersinh Vaghela (born 1940), Indian politician
- Gumansinhji Vaghela, Indian politician
- Liladhar Vaghela (born 1935), Indian politician
- Fakir Vaghela, Indian politician
- Gautam Vaghela (born 1936), Indian artist
- Mahendrasinh Vaghela, Indian politician
- Dharmendrasinh Vaghela, Indian politician
- Manilal Vaghela, Indian politician
- Darshna Vaghela, Indian politician
- Kaushaliya Vaghela, former Australian politician
- Vatsal Vaghela, American cricketer
- Isani Vaghela, American cricketer

== See also ==
- Vaghel
