= Jignesh Mevani =

Indian politician and activist

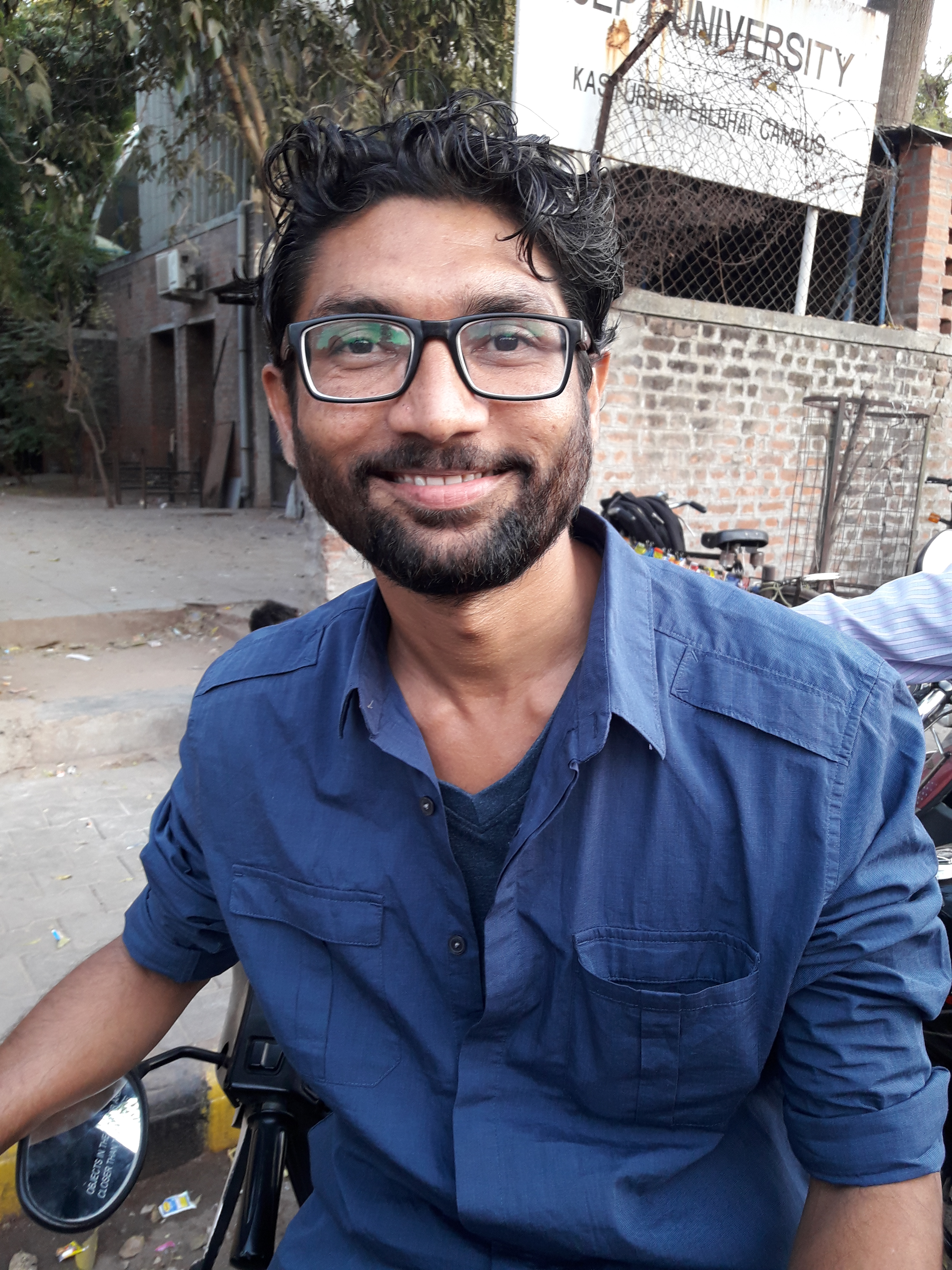
- Jignesh Mevani at Gujarati Literature Festival (GLF) on 16 December 2016

Member of Gujarat Legislative Assembly
- Incumbent
- Assumed office 18 December 2017
- Preceded by: Manilal Vaghela
- Constituency: Vadgam

Personal details
- Born: 11 December 1980 (age 45) Ahmedabad, Gujarat, India
- Party: Indian National Congress (2021–Present)
- Other political affiliations: Independent (2017–2021)
- Education: Gujarat University (BA, LLB); Bharatiya Vidya Bhavan (PGD)
- Occupation: Lawyer; Social Activist; Politician; Journalist
- Website: jigneshmevani.com

Jignesh Mevani (alternatively Mewani; born 11 December 1980) is an Indian politician, lawyer, activist and former journalist serving as the representative of the Vadgam constituency in the Gujarat Legislative Assembly since 2017. He is a member of the Indian National Congress party. He is the convener of the Rashtriya Dalit Adhikar Manch (RDAM).

== Early life and education ==
Jignesh Mevani was born on 11 December 1980 in Ahmedabad, Gujarat to a family of Dalits from the village of Meu in Mehsana district. He grew up in a lower middle class family, his parents had become government clerks, and resided in the Dalit populated locality of Meghaninagar in Ahmedabad. His father worked at the Ahmedabad Municipal Corporation and his mother at the Bharat Sanchar Nigam Limited (BSNL). Mevani attended school at the Swastik Vidyalaya and then the Vishwa Vidyalay Madhaymik Shala in Ahmedabad district. He began his higher secondary education in the core stream of science, dropped out and completed his schooling after switching to humanities. He attained his graduation in 2003 with a Bachelor of Arts in English literature from the HK Arts College, affiliated with the Gujarat University.

Mevani states that in college, he was never seen as just a Dalit student. He was particularly impressed by Saumya Joshi who was an associate professor and dramatist at the college and by the faculty member Sanjay Bhave who introduced him to various historical and contemporary figures of social activism in Gujarat. He further states it was because of Joshi and Bhave that he came into contact with Gujarati civil society newsletters such as Bhoomiputra, Nirikshak and Naya Marg. In his student life, Mevani performed in parallel cinema and researched the works of the Gujarati language poet, Mareez. He was also influenced by the Dutch painter Vincent van Gogh and the human rights activist Mukul Sinha during this period. Following his graduation, he enrolled at the Bhavan's College, Ahmedabad for a postgraduate diploma, in journalism and mass communication, which he received in 2004.

== Activism ==
=== Early career ===
In 2004, Mevani shifted to Mumbai and became a journalist with the Gujarati language news magazine called Abhiyaan. He worked at the magazine for three years before quitting journalism to become an activist. He also briefly worked for a Gujarati language daily newspaper during this period. In his testimony, he states that he "realised that idealism and realism are two different things" and came to the final decision to quit career as a journalist after watching the Gujarati documentary on farmers' suicides called Khedu Mora Re''.

Mevani started his activism through trade unions, and returned to Gujarat in 2008. He worked with the RTI activist Bharatsinh Zala with whom he visited several places to study the causes and issues leading to farmers' suicides. Eventually, he joined the civil rights organisation run by Mukul Sinha, called Jan Sangharsh Manch (JSM). In order to combat issues of discrimination against Dalits, he grew associations with activists such as Manjula Pradeep and Martin Macwan of the Navsarjan Trust and the Dalit Shakti Kendra. He also worked with the activist lawyer Girish Patel and the Gandhian activists Chunilal Vaidya for farmers' rights, land reform and the development of sustainable rural economies. Subsequently, he began leading an agitation for increasing the salaries of sanitation workers. Mevani states that he drew his last salary of ₹15,000 in August 2007 and relied on 10–15 friends to provide him with ₹1,000–1,500 for his monthly expenses in order to continue working as a full time activist.

In 2009, Mevani had led a JSM survey in the districts of Surendranagar and Ahmedabad to study the distribution of surplus government land to landless Dalits under provisions of the Gujarat Agriculture Land Ceiling Act. The findings of the survey revealed that the allotment of land had occurred only on paper and physical transfers of land had been denied. Over the course of the following years, he fought a long drawn out campaign over the allotment of land, in the process filing around 110 RTIs till 2015. Mevani was encouraged to pursue a degree in law in order to be better equipped to assist individuals in need of legal representation. He enrolled in the DT Law College of the Gujarat University while continuing his campaign over land issues during his studies. He graduated for a second time with a Bachelor of Laws degree in 2013, and became a practising activist lawyer at the Gujarat High Court, representing landless Dalits in their cases. He also joined the Aam Aadmi Party in 2014 and became its Gujarat spokesperson.

In 2015, Mevani initiated a public interest litigation at the High Court for the allocation of 56,873 acres of surplus government land to landless labourers in Gujarat. Due to his activism over the years, he gathered a following and a support base among workers' groups and Dalits.

=== Una incident and Dalit protests ===
Mevani rose to national prominence during the protests following the Una flogging incident. On 11 July 2016, seven Dalit youths were tortured in the town of Una, Gujarat on the pretext of cow protection and in the presence of the police. The assailants had filmed the incident and it was widely shared over social media. The incident culminated into a mass movement and large scale militancy among Dalits in the state. In midst of the protests, around 30 Dalit rights organisations had combined to form the Una Dalit Atyachar Ladat Samiti (abb. UDALS; Committee to fight against Una Dalit atrocities). The committee announced that a mass demonstration and assembly against caste based atrocities and discrimination was to be held in Ahmedabad on 30 July 2016. Mevani was one of the key organisers of the event, and was appointed the convener of the committee.

==== Dalit mahasabha and #Chalo Una march ====
The Dalit mahasabha (grand assembly) was held on 31 July 2016, after several refusals and delays in the grant of permission by the state administration. The government granted the venue of Archer Depot, a small water clogged ground to the organisers. It witnessed an assembly of around 20,000 people, consisting of ragpickers, scavengers, tanners, landless farm labourers, among others. The assembly which consisted mostly of young people also saw non-Dalits participants such as upper caste liberals, human rights activists, Muslims and other backward castes (OBCs). The gathering became one of the largest demonstrations for the cause of Dalits in the recent history of Gujarat. Mevani gave a speech during the assembly and was received with a wave of approval from the participants. The assembly invited a number of other speakers from a variety of backgrounds but due to the small size of the ground, many of people left early as they had to stand outside across the road.

Route of the first Azaadi Kooch.

The momentum garnered in the demonstration led the assembly to conclude with the decision to carry out a swabhiman yatra (dignity march) on foot, from Ahmedabad to Una, covering a distance of 380 km. The march was alternatively designated as the Dalit Asmita Yatra (Dalit Self Respect Journey), the Azaadi Kooch (Search for Freedom), or the #Chalo Una (Let's go to Una!) march. It began on 5 August and was led by Mevani along with a core group of 70 marchers, the numbers swelled up to thousands throughout the duration of the march as Dalits from across the state joined along various parts of it. The marchers also included activists from the Navsarjan Trust, the Jan Sangharsh Manch and the Communist Party of India.

One of the primary messages of the march was to encourage the Dalit community to leave their traditional caste based occupations and to demand the distribution of 5 acres of land to every landless Dalit in the state. Mevani was instrumental in making the issue of land reform and the allocation of land to landless Dalits a major demand of the protest reasoning that if Dalits had the land, they would not have to engage in their traditional occupations such as skinning and disposing of dead cows. His speeches drew massive crowds which was credited to his understanding of Dalit issues combined with oratorical skill. He coined the slogan "Gaaye nu puchhdu taame rakho, aamne amaari jameen aapo" (you keep the cow’s tail, give us our land) which came to be in widespread use throughout the protests. In the process, Mevani became a notional leader for the protests across the state since the incident.

On the route, the march received support from Scheduled Caste (SC) villages and no opposition or support from others. Activities such as meetings, distribution of radical literature, etc were confined to the SC villages. Large number of Dalits across the state took oaths to refrain from handling cow carcasses, including the tanners of 25 villages who took collective vows to stop performing their caste based occupation of disposing of dead cows. The procession stopped for the night at various towns and villages through their ten day foot march; Dholka town on 5 August, Koth village on 6 August, Dhandhuka town on 7 August, Barvala village on 8 August, Botad town on 9 August, Gadhada town on 10 August, passing through Amreli and halting at Savarkundla on 11 August, and reaching the town of Rajula on the night of 12 August. From 13 August onwards, the eighth day of the march, as the group approached closer to Una, locals from non-SC villages and Hindu nationalists began attacking the procession with stones, blockading their route and harassing the participants.

The march eventually came to an end on 15 August (Independence Day) after covering 350 km and with a mass meeting in the small village of Mota Samdhiyala. Situated near the town of Una, the village was the residence and place of origin of the victims of the Una incident, and witnessed a gathering of around 15,000 Dalits from around the state in the mass meeting. The assembly also saw the attendance of the Republican Panthers among Dalits, as well as a significant number of Muslims and students from various educational institutions. Due to the attacks on the march, the organisers were fearful of an incident on the day and decided to invite only two speakers who were already in the media spotlight, Mevani himself and the student leader Kanhaiya Kumar. Mevani presented a charter of 10 demands of the UDALS which included justice for the victims of the Una atrocity, alternative livelihood options, legal frameworks for the protection of Dalits against similar atrocities and 5 acres of land for every landless Dalit household in the state, along with a 30 day ultimatum seeking a response from the government. Radhika Vemula, the mother of Rohith Vemula, was also present and concluded the event with a flag salutation.

==== Rashtriya Dalit Adhikar Manch ====
In order to extend their agitation for land rights to a national scale, UDALS had launched the Rashtriya Dalit Adhikar Manch (RDAM; State Dalit Rights Platform). Mevani along with several of his friends were the founders of the platform. During the course of the agitation, Mevani resigned from his membership with the Aam Aadmi Party stating that he intended to keep the protests "untainted by political affiliations". He was also involved in the efforts of UDALS to form an alliance with the large network of Julahas (weavers) composed primarily of Dalit converts to Islam, another targeted community in atrocities on the pretext of cow protection. The RDAM held an agitation in Rajkot on 31 August with the assistance of the Navsarjan Trust, raising calls to renew the agitations for the charter of demands through means such as rail roko (train obstruction) and gheraos (picketing) of government offices for the charter of demands.

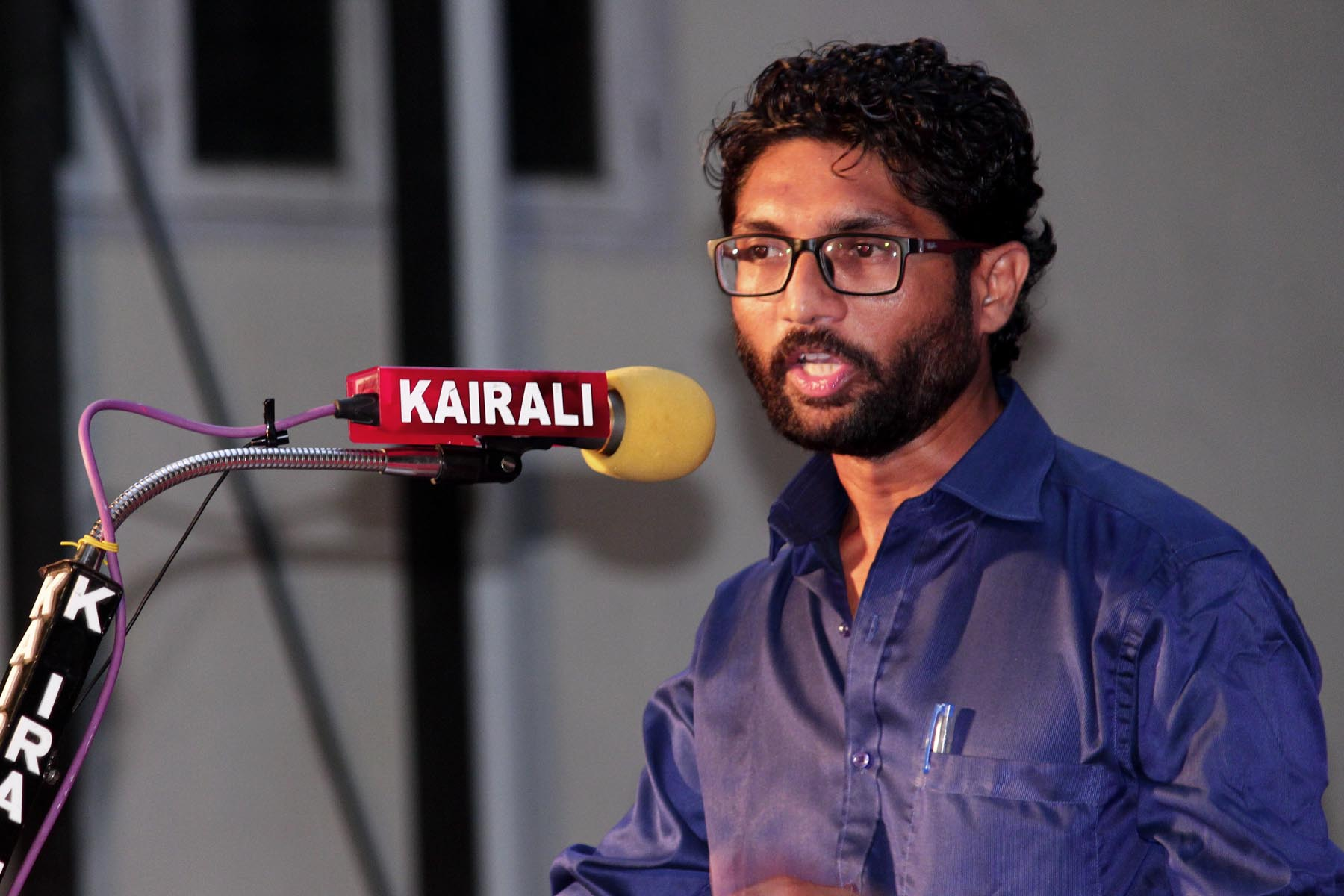
Jignesh Mevani at a programme in Thrissur, Kerala (2016).

Mevani employed the threat of mass civil disobedience after the government's refusal to negotiate, the proposed rail roko agitation was planned to begin on 1 October, at the Maninagar railway station in Ahmedabad. In the meantime, Mevani began to participate in events outside the state to raise support for the movement, bringing national media attention. The protests in Gujarat had been largely ignored by the corporate media. In midst of the protests, Mevani was arrested in the evening of 16 September at the Ahmedabad airport on his return from an event at New Delhi and put under detention for the duration of Narendra Modi's visit to Gujarat on his birthday. He was detained for a second time on 19 September during the staging of a protest outside the District Collector's office in Ahmedabad and again released on 20 September.

The protests continued over the month and the rail roko agitation was eventually called off on 1 October 2016, after the state government acceded to sitting on negotiations. The first meeting between the RDAM and the state government was held on 3 October. On 4 October, activists from the RDAM including Mevani were once again detained by the police before they could join a new wave of protests in Gandhinagar over a number of assaults on Dalits including the murder of one in Anand district in the last couple of days. The repeated use of preventive detention during the protests received criticism and were described as state repression and as a method of stifling the agitations.

The #Chalo Una march inspired a similar rally called Chalo Udupi in the state of Karnataka. Held in response to an assault on a Dalit family by a unit of the Bajrang Dal in the town of Chikmagalur, it began on 4 October at Freedom Park, Bangalore and ended on 9 October in the town of Udupi. Mevani attended the concluding event of the march and gave a speech accusing the government of caste based discrimination in land re-distribution and calling for a ban on gau rakshak groups and the practice of pankti bheda (caste based segregation) at the Udupi Sri Krishna Matha. The protests led by Mevani also inspired a similar protest from Banjaras in Rajasthan in response to another assault by members of the Bajrang Dal on the pretext of cow protection.

As of December 2016, the negotiations between the RDAM and the government had led to the distribution of plots of land to around 200 Dalit families. In his testimony, Mevani states that while Dalits frequently face much worse brutalities, the incident at Una became a symbol of their grievances and created an unmatched outcry, adding that anger among Dalits was simmering for years, and giving the example of the policemen who had shot 3 unarmed Dalits in 2012 and were yet to be arrested.

=== Later agitations ===
On 6 January 2017, Mevani along with Kanhaiya Kumar joined the agitations of the Kachra Vahtuk Shramik Sangh (transl. Garbage Collection Workers' Association) in Mumbai, Maharashtra. In 2015, the monthly minimum wage for municipal workers in the state was increased to ₹14,000 but sanitation was shifted to contractors who hired the workers and paid them wages of around ₹7,000–9,000. Drawing criticism at the Swachh Bharat Abhiyan, Mevani encouraged the workers to strike if they needed to, stating that the prime minister and Bollywood stars who had promoted themselves through the mission could clean the city themselves if the government continued to refuse basic pay for them.

On 9 January 2017, Mevani announced the beginning of an agitation during the Vibrant Gujarat Summit. The reason provided by Mevani for the agitation was that the government was readily offering land to corporate giants and signing countless memorandums of understanding with them while refusing to budge on enacting physical transfers of land to landless farmers and Dalits. The protest was scheduled to be held at Adalaj, 10 km away from the venue of the summit but in the early morning of 10 January, Mevani was detained by the police and released later at night. Sagar Rabari, the farmers' rights activist and the general secretary of the Gujarat Khedut Samaj (transl. Gujarat Farming Society), and Atul Patel, the Patidar Anamat Andolan Samiti (PAAS) leader were also detained on the day for declaring their support for the agitation.

Following release, Mevani accompanied by a team of RDAM activists presented a statement at the district magistrate's office which outlined the reason for holding protests and their demands, which according to him was dismissed by the officials. The dismissal prompted the RDAM and Mevani to commence plans for disrupting the summit by reviving the idea of the rail roko agitation which had been cancelled earlier in October 2016 with the beginning of the negotiations. On 11 January, RDAM activists including Mevani attempted to halt the Rajdhani Express at the Ahmedabad Junction railway station. According to the security commissioner in charge of the Ahmedabad division, Western Railway zone, the protesters emerged out of nowhere, Mevani himself climbed on top of the engine of the train and a group of women began to squat on the tracks in front of the train.

The Railway Protection Force (RPF) and Government Railway Police (GRP) arrested several protesters during the agitation and reportedly manhandled some of the women before the arrest. The women were released at midnight but the rest including Mevani and all the men were kept under arrest. The police booked cases against several of those who were arrested including Mevani and Lakshmiben Maheria, the woman RDAM member who was at the forefront of the protest, under Indian Penal Code sections on "rioting", "hurting public servants", "criminal conspiracy", among others and under the Indian Railways Act section on "endangering lives". The Metropolitan Court gave Mevani and a number of others conditional bail on the evening of 12 January. The agitation in the middle of Ahmedabad was described to have led to an increase in the visibility of the cause of the protesters among the general public.

In March, the Bharatiya Janata Party had begun campaigning in the Adivasi belt for the upcoming election in Gujarat. In response, the RDAM formed a pact with the Adivasi Kisan Sangharsh Morcha (transl. Adivasi Farmers' Struggle Front) and Mevani announced that they would launch their own campaign as an expose on the government's failure to grant land to Adivasis under provisions of the Forests Rights Act 2006.

==== Second Azaadi Kooch ====
Route of the second Azaadi Kooch.

To commemorate the protests of the earlier year and to reinforce the demand for land reforms in the state, Mevani organised a second Azaadi Kooch in July 2017. On the anniversary of the fogging incident, the RDAM conducted an event at the Ambedkar Hall, Ahmedabad. The auditorium saw a full attendance and featured participants from across the country including Kumar, the Manav Suraksha Kanoon committee member Anil Chamdia and the relatives of the victims of various lynching cases. The success of the programme prompted the announcement of the second Azaadi Kooch. It was scheduled to begin in the town of Mehsana and conclude at the town of Dhanera, Banaskantha district. Banaskantha Dalit Sangathan (BDS), a grassroots rights organisation was instrumental in co-ordinating with the RDAM to organise the procession.

The march began on 12 July and was marked by a jan sabha (people's assembly) of around 1,500 people at Somnath Chowk, Mehsana, located 75 km away from Ahmedabad. Mevani at the gathering, re-iterated the continued denial of physical possession of allotted land to the landless labourers and Dalit families in the state and their demands for it. Activists from the Communist Party of India joined the group in solidarity and continued to accompany the procession throughout the march. The Patidar leader Reshma Patel and the lawyer activist Shamshad Pathan were invited to the gathering, who aimed to highlight that the struggle for the rights of Dalits, Patidars and Muslims could be brought under the same platform. It was also attended by activists of the Pendu Mazdoor Union who had arrived from the state of Punjab to support their cause, and the members of the Jaipur Hangama Natak Dal and Budhan Theatre of Ahmedabad, who volunteered to perform at the gathering.

The march was disrupted within hours following its beginning. According to Mevani, a motorcycle attempted to run over him at Fatehpur village, unidentified individuals followed Pathan's vehicle and a group of men came to the procession searching for Kumar. The incidents were reported to the police who according to Pathan advised them to keep marching and not to stop. But as the procession passed through the village of Nani Dau, the police detained the conveners of the RDAM, Mevani and Kaushik Parmar, along with 200 participants of the procession at the village. The activists of the Pendu Mazdoor Union, the performers who had volunteered as well as Kumar and Patel were also detained while on their way back to Ahmedabad from Mehsana. The detainees were released after three hours and with a case of "unlawful gathering" lodged against 14 individuals, the core team of organisers, including Mevani.

On the same day, the police denied permission for the procession to conduct rallies in the towns of Unjha and Siddhpur, the next two destinations of the march. In response, Mevani asserted that the march should be conducted under any circumstances. It was expected to reach Unjha at 8 p.m. but arrived there late at night due to the detentions. The procession held a public meeting in the town at midnight and was joined by a large number of its residents in spite of the delay. Mevani gave a speech at the meeting where he stated that the government was sparing no effort to disrupt the march and that "[t]he momentum of the movement may have been slowed down, but the spirit has certainly not dampened."

The march reached Siddhpur on 13 July where it received a surge of Dalits, Muslims and members of the nomadic tribe of Chharas. Police personnel and attaches from state and central intelligence agencies began accompanying them by the time the march entered Banaskantha district. Dalpat Bhatia of the BDS helped them secure permission to march through the villages of Banaskantha and it continued without further disruption. It passed through the village of Sagrosana, near Palanpur on 14 July where it was received with felicitation, in particular from Dalit women. The RDAM had directly intervened in the village where a Dalit woman named Madhuben was attempting to gain possession of her land which she had been allotted in 2006. One of the committee members of the RDAM, Lakshmiben Maheria was a Dalit woman from the village. From the beginning the march was led by a large contingent of Dalit women, who gave speeches, sang songs and coined slogans on multiple occasions. One of the key issues the movement brought up was to campaign against the traditional custom of ghoonghat (face veil).

It reached the town of Deesa on 15 July, and eventually reached Dhanera on 18 July. One of the objectives of the Azaadi Kooch had been to conclude the march by securing land of 12 acres which was allotted to four Dalit families in the village of Lavara near Dhanera. On 17 July, while they had stopped at the village of Soneth, they were informed by the police personnel that Dileep Rana, the district magistrate (DM) of Banaskantha had taken up the issue and would ensure the physical possession of land. The march held a gathering at Dhanera which witnessed a participation of around 2,500–5,000 people cordoned by around 200 police personnel. During the gathering, the Dalits from Lavara reached the rally and informed them that their land was illegally occupied by a group of Rajputs who had threatened them including their sarpanch (village head). On receiving the news, Mevani announced that they would sit on a dharna (sit in protest) outside the Dhanera police station. The police agreed to file a First Information Report (FIR) against the encroachers, but prevented the procession from entering the village itself.

In the end, Bhatia from the BDS, accompanying members of the Communist Party and four members of the core team of the RDAM, namely Mevani, Dixit Parmar, Kaushik Parmar and Rakesh Maheria, visited the location accompanied by the police in order to oversee the transfer of the land. Activists in the BDS were assigned to maintain communications with the Dalit families to ensure that the land remained in their possession. The march lasted for 7 days and concluded with the transfer of land which occurred after a period of 50 years since they were first allotted to the four families. DM Rana later gave a statement that no case was registered against the encroachers since it was agricultural land and they were using it for that purpose. According to The Citizen news website, the march received a media blackout from most of the mainstream media.

== Member of Legislative Assembly ==
=== 2017 election ===
On 30 November 2017, it was announced that Mevani would contest in the Gujarat Legislative Assembly election as an independent candidate at Vadgam constituency. The constituency was reserved for Scheduled Castes and had a large population of Dalits. The announcement came at the last day for filing of nominations, and campaign lacked both funding and a concrete organisation. Mevani's campaign operated out of a motel situated in a small village on the Ahmedabad–Palanpur highway. The farmers' rights activist Sagar Rabari, volunteered to help the campaign in devising its election strategy. Local activists such as Dalpat Bhatia with a team of 1,000 people from the Banaskantha Dalit Sangathan and Ishaqbhai Maderia from the Jan Sangharsh Manch volunteered to campaign for him. Maderia was elected as sarpanch of Bhangal village, an year earlier in the panchayat (local body) elections and Mevani adopted the election symbol of sewing machine which Maderia had used in his election.

Mevani had appealed to other parties to not field candidates in the constituency stating that his fight was primarily against the ruling Bharatiya Janata Party (BJP). The Indian National Congress and the Aam Aadmi Party withdrew their candidates, and both the parties announced their support for Mevani. This turned it into primarily a bipolar contest between Mevani and Vijay Chakravarthi, the candidate of the BJP. Ashwin Parmar, the son of a former Congress legislator decided to rebel and contest from the constituency as an independent, causing apprehensions that he could draw in some of the votes that would have otherwise went to Mevani. Among other candidates were one from a local party called Jan Chetna, one from the Bahujan Samaj Party and six other independent candidates. According to Bhatia, the Banasakantha Dalit Sangathan was able to sway around 20,000 voters among Dalits towards voting for Mevani instead of Parmar.

Four separate groups emerged to campaign for him; his associates from Ahmedabad, human rights activists and volunteers from Delhi, local communities and organisations in Vadgam and the Congress party workers. His candidacy was endorsed by the Congress party vice-president Rahul Gandhi and the Thakor community activist Alpesh Thakor who had joined the Congress. According to one of Mevani's friends, the Congress party workers stopped working for their campaign after Ashwin Parmar's candidancy despite their party leadership's position. On 5 December, his procession was attacked during campaigning in Tarakwad village although no one was injured. Kaushik Parmar, an associate of Mevani at the RDAM states that the incident caused a surge in supporters volunteering for his campaign. His team arranged a crowdfunding initiative for the campaign which ultimately raised ₹20,50,000. The writer and activist Arundhati Roy donated ₹3,00,000 to the campaign. According to Roy, Mevani represented "a kind of breakthrough in Indian politics, a solidarity that rises from the bottom upwards".

In contrast to Mevani's campaign, the ruling Bharatiya Janata Party (BJP) had a well organised electoral machinery, the Hindustan Times in a later report compared it to a David vs Goliath situation. The BJP campaign created a perception among upper castes that the Dalit leader Mevani would conduct witch-hunts against them. According to Sagar Rabri, the community of Chaudharys were concerned that they would be targeted with cases under the Atrocities Act because Dalits worked in their farms and factories. The Prime Minister of India, Narendra Modi, the party president Amit Shah, the Chief Minister of Gujarat, Vijay Rupani and the Chief Minister of Uttar Pradesh, Yogi Adityanath themselves arrived to campaign against him in the constituency. During the campaign, the BJP spokesperson Sambit Patra accused Mevani of having "terror links" in response to which he threatened to initiate a defamation suit against the party.

Before the announcement of the results, Mevani had predicted that he would either lose or win with a small margin of around 5,000 votes. Mevani won the election with a margin of over 18,000 votes. Chakravarthi secured 75,801 votes polling at 40.32% while Mevani secured 95,397 votes polling at 50.79%.

=== Tenure ===
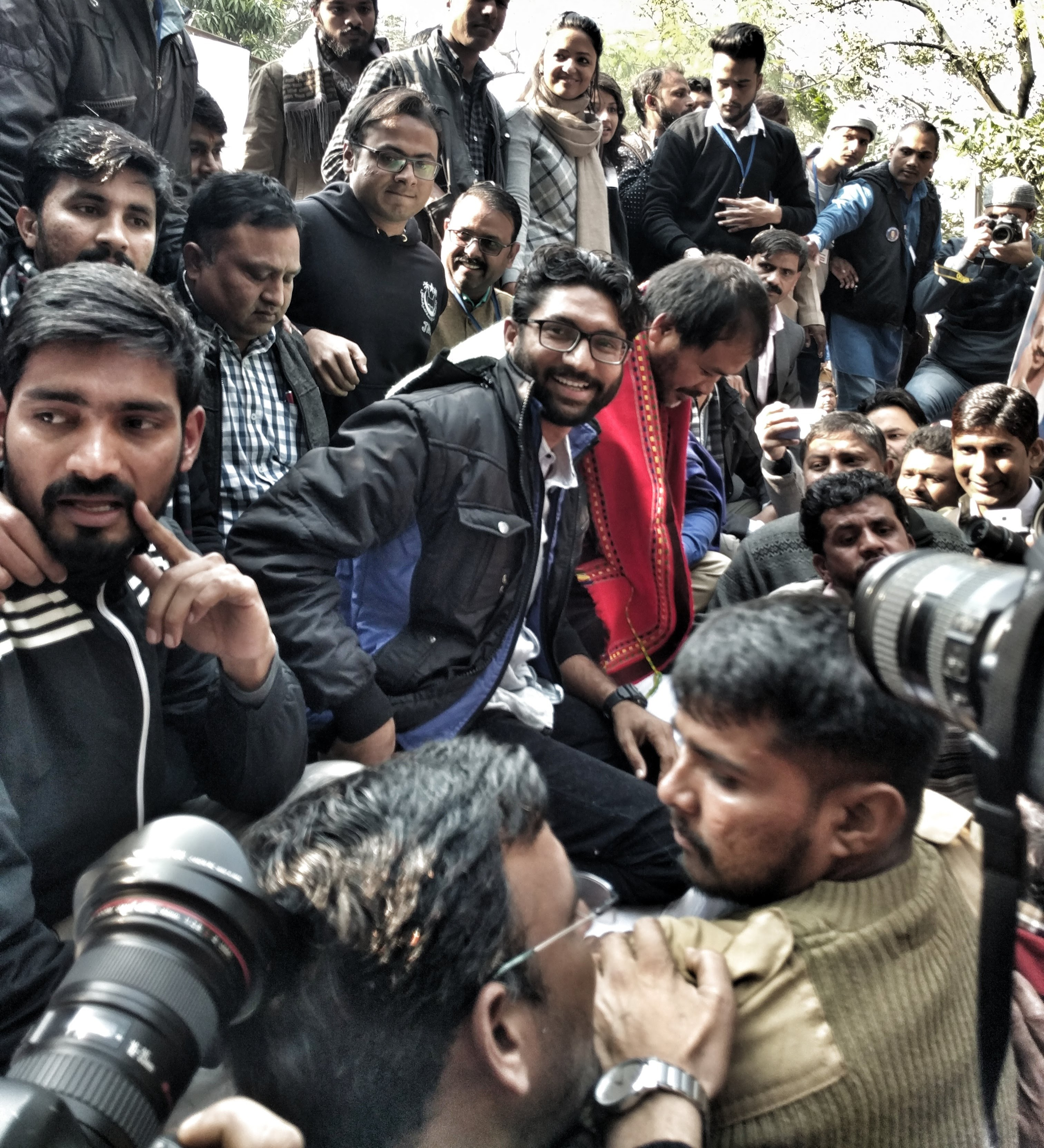
Jignesh Mevani (center) at Youth Hunkar rally on Sansad Marg, New Delhi (9 January 2018)

On 6 October 2018, Mevani attended a panel discussion of Dalit leaders, activists and academics at Jaipur, Rajasthan.

In February 2019, the president and the vice-president of the HK Arts College were forced to cancel an event where they had invited Mevani (an alumnus of the college) and resigned thereafter under pressure from Bharatiya Janata Party affiliated students union leaders.

In December 2019, Mevani opposed the Statue of Unity Area Development and Tourism Governance Bill on the justification that it would adversely effect the tribals in the area, stating that they were displaced from 70 villages when the government forcefully snatched their lands for the construction of the statue. The Bill created a governance authority empowered to take punitive action against engaging in activities which would harm the "tourism potential" of the site, including begging, hawking and unauthorised development. Mevani was suspended for 3 days on grounds of indiscipline after alleging that the Treasury benches followed the Manusmriti and not the Constitution, according to him the bill violated the provisions of the Schedule 5 of the Constitution of India.

In March 2021, Mevani was suspended for a day on grounds of indiscipline from the Gujarat Legislative Assembly by the speaker Rajendra Trivedi. He was demanding the arrest of a police officer and had questioned the Home Minister, Pradipsinh Jadeja on whether he was related to the officer who was allegedly present at an incident where a Dalit RTI activist was beaten to death by a group of upper caste men.

In April 2021, Mevani raised the issue of postponement of offline secondary and higher secondary boards examination in Gujarat, stating that Central Board of Secondary Education has cancelled its offline examinations but the education department is continuing it and risking the lives of students.

==== Arrest ====
Mevani was arrested by the Assam Police on 20 April 2022 after he made a tweet criticising the Prime Minister Narendra Modi, with charges under the Indian Penal Code sections for criminal conspiracy, hurting religious sentiment and threat to peace. The BJP leader who filed the complaint stated that it was done to send a message to people that they need to be careful about making negative posts against the Prime Minister. Mevani stated that the arrest came as a surprise to him but he was not afraid and would continue to fight for the rights of the deprived, adding that the arrest has only gone to highlight the real situation of the country and the motives of the government. He was arrested at midnight from his residence in Gujarat and transported to Kokrajhar district, Assam, where his anticipatory bail was initially rejected by the district court which stating that the hearing for it will be held on a later date.

The arrest received condemnation and was described as an attack on freedom of speech and intimidation of dissidents through the misuse of law and order machinery under the Modi administration in India. Human rights activist such as Akhil Gogoi, Kavita Krishnan, Ajit Kumar Bhuyan and opposition politicians including Debabrata Saikia, Gaurav Gogoi and Rahul Gandhi extended their support to him. Rajasthan Chief Minister Ashok Gehlot stated that the arrest was an attack on democratic norms and an example of the dictatorial attitude of the Modi administration and the Bharatiya Janata Party. The President of the Telangana Rashtra Samithi, K. T. Rama Rao reiterated the statement in Mevani's tweet, that Modi was following Nathuram Godse's ideology and dared the government to arrest him as well. Activists and opposition parties including the Indian National Congress organised a protest outside the Kokrajhar police station where Mevani was being held with plans to move the case to the Guwahati High Court if necessary, while several other activists and supporters of Mevani announced their intention to escalate the protests to Delhi. After a 3 day police custody, he was moved to judicial custody by the district court with the date for the hearing scheduled for 25 April.

He was released on 25 April after the hearing with the court stating that it did not find any reasonable grounds for keeping him detained, but he was re-arrested immediately after his release and moved to a police station in Barpeta district, Assam. The arrest was made with new charges of obscenity and assault based on a complaint that he had used slang words and pushed a police officer when he was being transported to Kokrajhar. Mevani's lawyer stated the new charges were a later fabrication as there was no mention of this allegation during the 3 day custody or in the court hearing arguments. Kirit Rathod, the convener of a rights organisation filed a petition and stated that his fundamental rights were being violated as he was not provided a copy of his FIR and was not allowed to meet his lawyer, leading to the chief secretaries of Gujarat and Assam being sent notices to present the facts of the case to the National Commission for Scheduled Castes. Spontaneous protests against the arrest emerged in several places in Gujarat, occurring at two levels, with one composed of the Indian Nation Congress with Kanhaiya Kumar leading it and the other composed of ordinary Dalits, civil society organisations and other supporters of Mevani. Mevani's supporters have also stated that Gujarat Police has been threatening and harassing Mevani's family and associates since his arrest.

Mevani was released on 30 April after a hearing at the district court stating that one would have to rewrite the entire criminal jurisprudence to the able to accept the case and that "converting our hard-earned democracy into a police state is simply unthinkable". During the court's testimony, the officer contradicted the FIR and did not state that Mevani had used his hands to apply any physical force on the officer or uttered any obscene words, rather that he had spoken words in his language which were allegedly abuses that the officer did not understand. The court reprimanded the police stating that they had manufactured a false case and misused the process to keep him detained for a longer period. The court also sent a request to the Guwahati High Court to take up a petition for police reforms to mandate officers to wear body cameras and install CCTVs in police vehicles, raising concerns that Assam was becoming a police state, citing frequent instances of police brutality and other excesses in the state.

=== 2022 election ===
Mevani was elected from Vadgam constituency again in 2022 Gujarat Legislative Assembly election as an INC candidate defeating his nearest rival and Bharatiya Janata Party candidate Manilal Vaghela.

In 2022 Gujarat assembly elections, Jignesh Mevani won the election with a margin of over 5,000 votes. Manilal Vaghela secured 89,837 votes polling at 45.51% while Mevani secured 94,765 votes polling at 48%.

== Political positions ==
Mevani is the convener of the Rashtriya Dalit Adhikar Manch (State Dalit Rights Platform), who identifies himself as a social liberal and Ambedkarite. He subscribes to the school of thought in Ambedkarism, propounded by Anand Teltumbde, according to which social transformation is not achievable by solely focusing on caste as it leads to repeated division within the movement and that it needs to forge a class unity among all marginalised groups. According to Mevani, there is a material foundation to caste beyond that of just being a sociocultural phenomenon, and that "for the annihilation of caste, struggle against caste and class both go hand in hand".

Described as a part of a new emergent left wing in India, Mevani has formed direct associations with individuals such as Chandrashekhar Azad Ravan, Gauri Lankesh, Kanhaiya Kumar, Shehla Rashid and Umar Khalid, among others. On being called a communist, he states that he is yet to attain the same understanding that communists have to be considered one.

=== Land reform ===
Mevani is a proponent of land reform in India. One of his long standing demands, has been that of allotment and distribution of 5 acres of land to landless farming families. His interest in the question of land is considered to be unique in contemporary Dalit politics. Mevani states that "one can not preach self respect to empty stomachs" and that land reform is a vital tool which can bring about important structural changes for the annihilation of caste.

=== Labour rights ===
Mevani is a vocal supporter of labour rights, including the dismantling of contract employment. He has also advocated for the sanitation workers to be made permanent and offered benefits akin to other government jobs.

=== Anti-fascism ===
Mevani is an advocate for unity between anti-fascist groups, and endorses the formation of a joint platform between all anti-Sangh Parivar and leftist groups. Identifying the Hindutva movement – consisting of the Rashtriya Swayamsevak Sangh, its Sangh Parivar affiliates and the Bharatiya Janata Party – as a movement for fascism in India, he states that it intends to reorient the state into a casteist and fascist system on the lines of the Manusmriti and the teachings of Hindutva ideologues like M. S. Golwalkar. He has taken the stance that he intends to oppose them wherever they are as they threaten the Constitution of India.
