= Jagdish Thakor =

Indian politician (born 1957)

President of Gujarat Pradesh Congress Committee
- In office 6 December 2021 – 9 June 2023
- Preceded by: Amit Chavda
- Succeeded by: Shaktisinh Gohil

Member of the Indian Parliament for Patan
- In office 2009–2014
- Preceded by: Mahesh Kanodia
- Succeeded by: Liladharbhai Vaghela

Assembly Member for Dahegam
- In office 2002–2009
- Preceded by: Gabhaji Thakor
- Succeeded by: Kalyan Chauhan

Personal details
- Born: 1 July 1957 (age 68) Ahmedabad, Bombay State, India
- Party: Indian National Congress
- Spouse: Shradaben
- Children: 2 sons and 3 daughters
- Website: http://jagdishthakor.com/
- As of November, 2021

Jagdish Thakor (born 1 July 1957) is an Indian National Congress politician from Gujarat, India. He was the member of 15th Lok Sabha of India. He represented the Patan constituency of Gujarat. Thakor belongs to the Koli community of Gujarat.

== Political career ==
Thakor began his political career as a student leader in 1973 and won his first Assembly election in 2002.

=== Member of Legislative Assembly (2002-2012) ===
He was elected as MLA from Dahegam in 2002 and 2007. Between 2007 and 2008 he was the Chief Whip, Congress, Gujarat Legislative Assembly.

=== Member of Parliament (2009-2014) ===
He was MP in the 15th Lok Sabha from Patan Lok Sabha constituency between 2009 and 2014, and lost his seat in the 2014 Lok Sabha elections.

On 3 December 2021, Thakor was appointed Gujarat Pradesh Congress Committee president.

== 2022 Gujarat Legislative Assembly Election ==
In December 2021, the Indian National Congress held a mock assembly in Rajkot, to highlight the plight of the youth for jobs. Thakor slammed the government saying "In Gujarat, 11 question papers were leaked. 25 lakh youth applied for government jobs. Despite having lost confidence in the government, 10 to 12 lakh of them are still applying for jobs and those eligible are not getting them." He also added that jobs were not going to the average youth, and that the government was giving jobs to BJP functionaries.

In April 2022, Jignesh Mevani, Gujarat Congress MLA from Vadgam was arrested by Assam Police in Palanpur, Jagdish Thakor hit out at the BJP, saying that he was arrested for tweeting against the Rashtriya Swayamsevak Sangh, a Hindu-nationalist parent organization of the BJP.

In July 2022, Thakor along with several Gujarat Congress leaders workers staged a sit-in in Lal Darwaja, Ahmedabad for 2 hours to protest against the summoning of Sonia Gandhi by the Enforcement Directorate, which they alleged was working with the BJP-led central government to intimidate opposition leaders. Thakor said that this was vindictive politics, "Though Soniaji is unwell, she is cooperating in the probe. The BJP is harassing opposition leaders to distract people from real issues, such as price rise." The Congress also staged a protest at Koba, Gandhinagar demanding Gujarat Subordinate Service Selection Board (GSSSB) chairman and BJP leader Asit Vora to resign.

In July 2022, after the Gujarat toxic liquor deaths, Thakor slammed the BJP, saying that it is maligning the image of Gujarat, and also failing to implement the prohibition in Gujarat. "The sarpanch of Rojid (Dharmendra Patel, a Congress leader) had repeatedly alerted the police in the past regarding illicit sale of spurious liquor in his village yet no action was taken. The BJP and police are running a partnership with the bootleggers in Gujarat." Jagdish Thakor said. He also criticized the BJP for wasting taxpayers money, and for not meeting the victims of the tragedy. He said that unemployment was being neglected, and said that the government was giving booze and drugs to the youth instead of jobs.

In September 2022, Thakor and the Congress party gave a bandh call in Gujarat, as a symbolic protest against inflation and unemployment. He alleged that 4.5 lakh youth were unemployed out of which 4.3 lakh were qualified, even though 4.5 lakh government posts were vacant in the state. He also said that 27000 posts for teachers are open, that there were hundreds of libraries without a librarian. Talking about inflation, Thakor said that prices of basic commodities are very high and that it had a cascading effect on the average citizen's life. He instructed Congress workers to ensure that emergency services were not stopped because of the bandh call.

== See also ==
- List of Koli people
- List of Koli states and clans
