= Bhavsinh Rathod =

Indian politician (died 2021)

MLA of Gujarat
- In office 2007–2012
- Constituency: Sami

MLA of Gujarat
- In office 1995–1998
- Constituency: Sami

Personal details
- Died: 2021 Ahmedabad, Gujarat, India
- Party: Indian National Congress (1990-95, 2007-09, 2012-), Bharatiya Janata Party (2009-12)

Bhavsinh Dahyabhai Rathod (died 29 May 2021) was a politician from Gujarat, India.

He was a Member of the Legislative Assembly from Sami constituency in 9th and 12th Gujarat Legislative Assembly.

== Biography ==
Rathod was a decoit. He later left decoity and joined politics.

He contested 1990 Gujarat Legislative Assembly election from Sami-Harij constituency as a candidate of the Indian National Congress but lost. He again contested 1995 Gujarat legislative assembly election as an independent and won. He contested 2007 Gujarat Legislative Assembly election as an INC candidate and won.

In 2009, he resigned as an INC MLA to join Bharatiya Janata Party (BJP) and contested 2009 Indian general election from Patan as a BJP candidate but lost to INC candidate Jagdish Thakor. He won legislative assembly bye-election in 2009 and retained his seat as BJP candidate from Sami. He rejoined INC in 2012. He contested 2014 Indian general election from Patan as an INC candidate but lost.

He was arrested in 2013 in connection with hashish smuggling and a case against him was registered in Ernakulam in 1989 in which he was convicted.

He died on 9 May 2021 in Ahmedabad due to COVID-19 infections on his kidney.
