= Manjula Pradeep =

Indian human rights activist (born 1969)

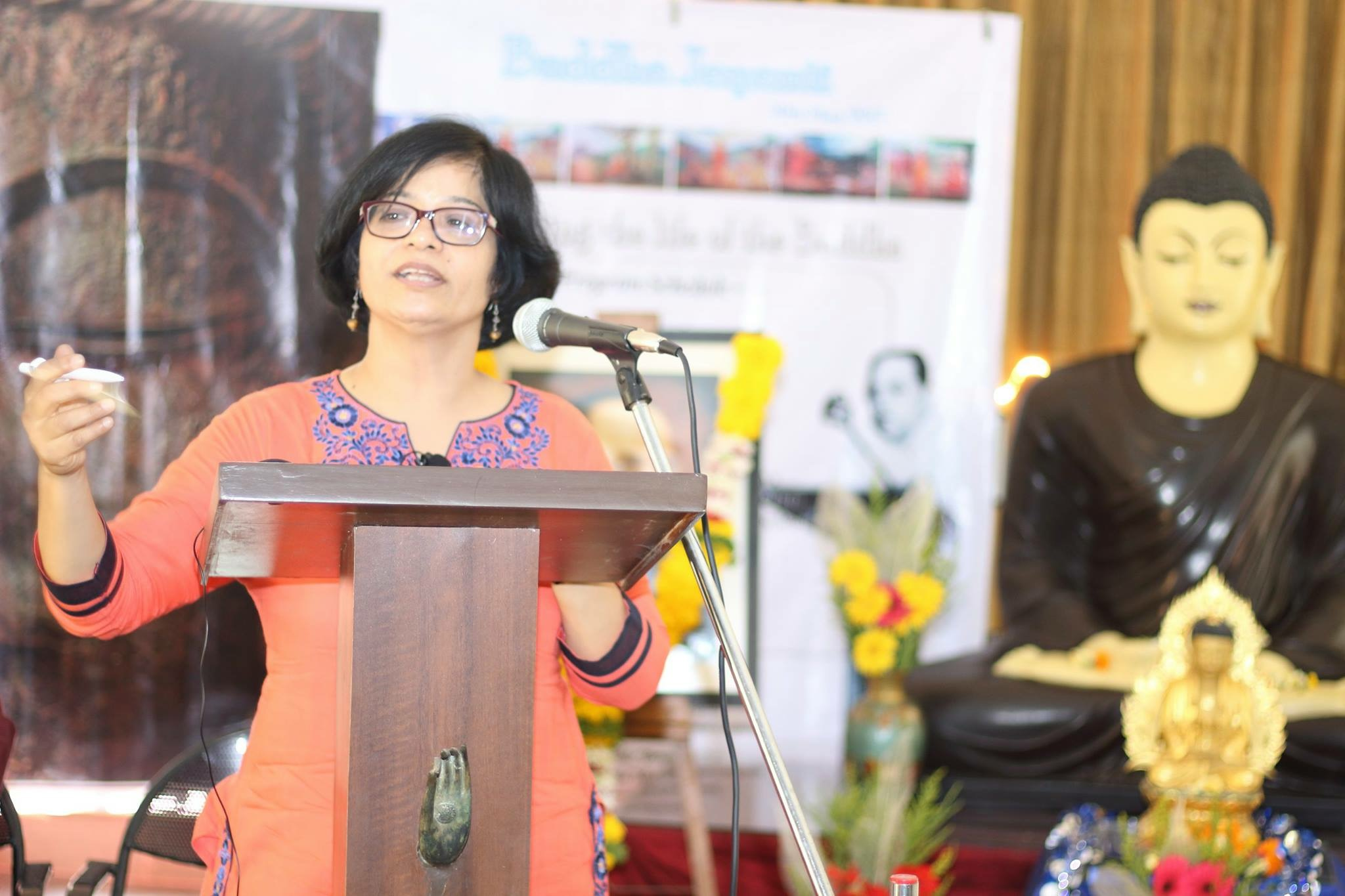
- Born: 6 October 1969 (age 56)
- Education: Social Work, Maharaja Sayajirao University of Baroda (MA, 1992); LL.B., Gujarat University (1998)

Manjula Pradeep (born 6 October 1969) is an Indian human rights activist and a lawyer. She is the former Executive Director of Navsarjan Trust, one of the largest Dalit rights organizations in India, addressing the issues of caste discrimination and gender based discrimination.

== Early life ==
Manjula Pradeep was born on 6 October 1969 in Vadodara (formerly known as Baroda) in Gujarat in an orthodox Dalit family, shortly after her family migrated from Uttar Pradesh in 1968. Her birth was met with disappointment as her father expected a son, instead of a second daughter. He blamed Manjula's mother for her birth and abused both of them physically and mentally since her birth. Manjula was also sexually abused by four men in her childhood.

Fearing caste discrimination, Manjula's father hid their surname and instead took up a generic name 'Pradeep' as a surname. However, that did not prevent Manjula from discrimination at school. Her teachers and peers often ridiculed her due to her caste; students would call her “ABC,” referring to “BC,” or “Backwards Caste”.

The challenges that Manjula faced at home and in the society made her question caste and gender-based discrimination, shaping the trajectory of her future career and activism.

== Education ==
During her undergraduate studies, one of her professors encouraged Manjula to pursue social work. This inspired Manjula to enroll into the Master's degree of Social Work at the Maharaja Sayajirao University of Baroda in 1990. It was at the university, where she started challenging the male-dominated arena of Dalit politics, and became involved in Dalit and feminist activism.

While working at Navsarjan, her first case was of a Dalit woman whose son had died, after being abused in police custody at an Ahmedabad police station. This incident lead Manjula to pursue her Bachelor of Law degree at her Alma mater because she realized that the Dalit rights issue had to be fought both, in the streets and in the courts.

== Career ==
After finishing her master's degree in 1992, Manjula Pradeep joined the Navsarjan Trust at the age of 21 as their first female employee. In 2004, she was elected at the Executive Director at the organisation.

=== Early years at Navsarjan Trust ===
Her first job at Navsarjan was with the legal aid programme that helped survivors of violence and discrimination fight for justice. Manjula realised that in order to effectively defend people's human rights, she would have to study the law. “I need to know the law in order to have any power… So much for that social work degree. A law degree is what I need.”

In 1995, she started training programs to generate awareness against the exploitation among bonded labourers, mainly women who survived on a few rupees a day and were continually in debt to the landlords whose agricultural lands they worked on. They were often subjected to physical and sexual violence. She also helped set up a union of Dalit and tribal women, Vadodara Khet Majoor Sangathan, which aimed to end the injustices faced by these women. In the same year, she joined the board of the Navsarjan Trust.

In 2000, in a first for the organisation, Manjula trained 40 women to take up leadership roles in Navsarjan. She also helped organize a protest attended by around 3,000 Dalits, where the term “Dalit Shakti,” or Dalit Power was first used by Martin Macwan.

In June 2001, Manjula was one of the youngest members of the National Campaign on Dalit Human Rights (NCDHR) delegation sent to the United Nations to represent Dalit rights. The NCDHR delegation was in Geneva, Switzerland to get caste-based discrimination included in the agenda for the United Nations World Conference Against Racism, Xenophobia and Related Intolerance that would be held later that year.

She took a sabbatical in 2002 for a year to work at the Swiss Agency for Development and Cooperation in New Delhi, India and helped develop the Swiss aid program.

=== Executive Director at Navsarjan Trust ===
After Martin Macwan announced his resignation as Executive Director of Navsarjan in 2005, Manjula was elected Executive Director of Navsarjan. She reviewed the functioning of Navsarjan and made efforts to eliminate corruption within the organisation. The following year, she was invited to speak at the International Conference of Dalit Women at The Hague, Netherlands. Manjula joined the International Dalit Solidarity Network, based in Copenhagen, in 2008.

In 2008, Manjula defended the case of a 17-year-old minor Dalit girl who was repeatedly gang-raped by six teachers of the Primary Teacher's Training College (PTC) in Patan, Gujarat for six months. In 2009, Manjula helped win this case where the teachers were sentenced to life imprisonment by the Gujarat High Court. The case was a representation of the intersection of caste, gender and politics in the country.

Following the case, Navsarjan took on more than 30 similar cases representing minors and young women.

==== Cancellation of Navsarjan Trust's FCRA ====
In August 2016, Manjula and Navsarjan were one of the key figures in the Gujarat Dalit unrest, after four tanners from the Dalit community were stripped and attacked by cow vigilantes in Una, Gujarat. In December 2016, the Union Home Ministry canceled Navsarjan's FCRA certificate implicating that the trust was engaged in “undesirable activities aimed to affect prejudicially harmony between religious, racial, social, linguistic, regional groups, castes or communities”. The cancellation resulted in Navsarjan laying off most of its employees, and left the on-ground activities of the trust across 3,000 villages in the lurch. Manjula was asked to resign from her post as the Executive Director in December 2016.

=== Current work ===
Manjula cofounded the Dalit Human Rights Defenders Network (DHRDNet) to address issues of Dalit human rights violations in India. Manjula has founded Wise Act of Youth Visioning and Engagement (WAYVE) Foundation, which works for the empowerment and rights of marginalized women and youth in India, building their leadership and awareness about Constitutional Rights.

Manjula is also involved with the National Council of Women Leaders (NCWL) where she serves as the national convener. She is also a member of the Executive Committee of the National Center for Advocacy Studies, India. She represents issues facing Dalits and Dalit women in international forums, such as the United Nations and the European Union, and other international platforms.

== Awards ==
Manjula Pradeep was conferred Woman Peace Maker award for the year 2011 by the Joan B. Kroc Institute for Peace and Justice (IPJ) of the University of San Diego, US. Over the years, she has received Femina Women 2015 Social Impact Award and Jijabai Women Achievers Award in 2017 by University of Delhi.

In 2021, she was recognized as one of the BBC's 100 women.
