= Chandanji Thakor =

Member of Gujarat Legislative Assembly
- In office 2017–2022
- Preceded by: Balvantsinh Rajput
- Succeeded by: Balvantsinh Rajput
- Constituency: Sidhpur

Personal details
- Born: 1 June 1972 (age 53)
- Party: Indian National Congress

Chandanji Talaji Thakor is an Indian National Congress politician and was a member of the Gujarat Legislative Assembly between 2017 and 2022, elected from Sidhpur.

== Electoral Performance ==
| Year | Election | Party | Constituency Name | Result |
|---|---|---|---|---|
| 2017 | 2017 Gujarat Legislative Assembly election | INC | Sidhpur | Won |
| 2022 | 2022 Gujarat Legislative Assembly election | INC | Sidhpur | Lost |
| 2024 | 2024 Indian general election | INC | Patan | Lost |
