= Jay Narayan Vyas =

Indian politician

Member of Gujarat Legislative Assembly
- In office 1990–2012
- Preceded by: Balvantsinh Rajput
- Succeeded by: Balvantsinh Rajput
- Constituency: Siddhpur

Personal details
- Born: 14 April 1947 (age 79) Sidhpur
- Citizenship: Indian
- Party: Bharatiya Janata Party (1990-2022); Indian National Congress (2022-present)
- Spouse: Suhasini Vyas
- Children: Sapna Vyas
- Parent: Narmadashankar Vyas
- Education: Indian Institute of Technology Bombay
- Occupation: Educationist, Politician, manager
- Profession: Ex.Bureaucrat, Politician
- Cabinet: Government of Gujarat
- Portfolio: Ministry of Health & Family Welfare, Co-ordination of Voluntary Organisations, Non Resident Gujarati Division (2007-2012)
- Website: jnvyas.org

Jay Narayan Vyas (born 14 April 1947) is an Indian politician, scholar, analyst, administrator and public life official from Gujarat, India. He is the former Cabinet Minister of the Government of Gujarat in charge of the Health and Family Welfare department from 2007 to 2012 during the Bharatiya Janata Party rule.

== Education ==
He received a degree in Civil Engineering from the Maharaja Sayajirao University of Baroda and a post graduate degree in Civil Engineering from Indian Institute of Technology Bombay. He also holds postgraduate qualifications in Marketing Management and a degree in law.

== Career ==
Vyas teamed up with Bakul Dholakia, former director of Indian Institute of Management Ahmedabad, and Mukesh Patel, a tax scholar and columnist, to present a post-budget discussion following the presentation of the union budget in the Parliament of India. The session conducted by this trio spans over three decades.

=== Bureaucratic career ===
Vyas is a water management expert. He headed the Sardar Sarovar Dam project as a Chairman responsible for its implementation. It was one of the largest multi-purpose water management projects in India. He also guided the implementation of this project later date as the Minister in charge of Sardar Sarovar and major irrigation projects.

=== Political career ===
Vyas has had a political career spanning over 35 years. He was elected to Gujarat Legislative Assembly in 1990-2007 and became Cabinet Minister in Government of Gujarat in charge of Health & Family Welfare, Co-ordination of Voluntary Organisations, Non Resident Gujarati Division.

Vyas lost to Balvantsinh Rajput of the Indian National Congress for the Siddhpur assembly seat in 2012 Gujarat legislative assembly election who he had defeated in 2007. He lost again to INC candidate Chandaji Thakor for Siddhpur in 2017 Gujarat legislative assembly election. He left BJP in November and joined INC in December 2022.
