= Fakir Vaghela =

Indian politician

Former Member of Legislative assembly of Gujarat Legislative Assembly
- In office 2007–2012
- Succeeded by: Manilal Vaghela
- Constituency: Vadgam

Personal details
- Born: October 17, 1952
- Died: April 30, 2013 (aged 60) Gandhinagar, Gujarat, India
- Party: Bhartiya Janata Party

Fakirbhai Raghabhai Vaghela was a Cabinet Minister in the Bharatiya Janata Party ministry of Gujarat state of India. He was minister in charge of Social Justice and Empowerment,(Including Welfare of Schedule Caste, Welfare of Socially and Educationally Backward Classes), Sports, Youth, Culture Activities. He was M.Com, L.L.B. (Spl), D.L.P. & C.A.I.I.B. (Banking). He died on 30 April 2013 at the age of 61 due to heart attack at their home place, Gandhinagar.

He was a Member of Legislative assembly from Vadgam constituency in Gujarat for its 12th legislative assembly.
