= Reshma (air base) =

- IATA: none; ICAO: RU-2504

Summary
- Airport type: Military
- Location: Dyachevo, or Saltanikha Kineshemsky District, Ivanovo Oblast, Russia
- Elevation AMSL: 410 ft / 125 m
- Coordinates: 57°25′36″N 042°25′48″E
- Interactive map of Reshma

Runways
Direction	Length		Surface
Direction	ft	m	Surface
	4,921	1,500

Reshma (Russian: Решма) is an abandoned Soviet air base in Russia located 17 km (11 mi) east of Kineshma.

It was hastily constructed in summer 1941 after the German attack on the Soviet Union. It was an auxiliary airstrip of the Kineshma airport (also dismantled) and only traces of it remained.
