= Vadgam Assembly constituency =

Legislative Assembly constituency in Gujarat State, India

Coordinates: 24.08°N 72.49°E

Vadgam
- Constituency No. 11 for the Gujarat Legislative Assembly

Constituency details
- Country: India
- Region: Western India
- State: Gujarat
- District: Banaskantha
- Lok Sabha constituency: Patan
- Established: 2007
- Total electors: 295,281
- Reservation: SC

Member of Legislative Assembly
- 15th Gujarat Legislative Assembly
- Incumbent Jignesh Mevani
- Party: Indian National Congress
- Elected year: 2022

Vadgam is one of the 182 Legislative Assembly constituencies of Gujarat state in India. It is part of Banaskantha district, numbered as 11-Vadgam and is reserved for candidates belonging to the Scheduled Castes. It falls under the Patan Lok Sabha constituency.

== List of segments ==
This assembly seat represents the following segments,

1. Vadgam Taluka
2. Palanpur Taluka (Part) Villages – Hathidra, Kumpar, Godh, Dhandha, Khasa, Hoda, Galwada, Sagrosana, Bhagal (Jagana), Manaka, Gola, Merwada (Ratanpur), Vagda, Jagana, Vasna (Jagana), Badarpura (Kalusana), Saripada, Patosan, Salla, Sasam, Takarwada, Tokariya, Sedrasana, Kamalpur, Fatepur, Semodra, Asmapura (Gola), Dhelana, Kharodiya, Jasleni, Badargadh, Kanodar (CT).

== Members of the Legislative Assembly ==
Year	Member	Party
2002	Dolatbhai Parmar	Indian National Congress
2007	Fakir Vaghela	Bharatiya Janata Party
2012	Manilal Vaghela	Indian National Congress
2017	Jignesh Mevani	Independent
2022	Jignesh Mevani	Indian National Congress

== Election results ==
=== 2022 ===
Gujarat Assembly election, 2022: Vadgam Assembly constituency
Party	Candidate	Votes	%	±%
INC	Jignesh Mevani	94,765	48.00%	+48%
BJP	Manilal Vaghela	89,837	45.51%	+5.19%
AAP	Dalpat Bhatiya	4,493	2.28	+2.28%
NOTA	None of the above	2,877	1.46	
Majority		4,928	2.49	
Turnout		197,420	66.21%	−6.00%
Registered electors		295,281		
INC gain from Independent		Swing		

=== 2017 ===
Gujarat Legislative Assembly Election, 2017: Vadgam
Party	Candidate	Votes	%	±%
Independent	Jignesh Mevani	95,497	50.79	New
BJP	Vijaykumar Chakravarti	75,801	40.32	−0.24
NOTA	None of the above	4,255	2.26	
Independent	Narendra Makwana	3,711	1.97	New
BSP	Pushpaben Jadav	1,263	0.67	
Majority		19,696	10.47	
Turnout		1,88,006	72	
Independent gain from INC		Swing		

=== 2012 ===
2012 Gujarat Legislative Assembly election: Vadgam
Party	Candidate	Votes	%	±%
INC	Manilal Vaghela	90375	53.48	
BJP	Fakir Vaghela	68536	40.56	
Independent	Parmar Jayeshkumar Khemchandbhai	5190	3.07	
JD(U)	Vansola Gautambhai Kanjibhai	1672	0.99	
Majority		21839	12.92	
Turnout		168988	72.27	
INC gain from BJP		Swing		

=== 2007 ===
Gujarat Assembly Election, 2007
Party	Candidate	Votes	%	±%
BJP	Fakir Vaghela	50,481	44.76	
INC	Dolatbhai Parmar	40,776	36.16	
Independent	Dineshbhai Parmar	16,372	14.52	
Majority			8.60	
Turnout		112776		
BJP gain from INC		Swing		

== See also ==
- List of constituencies of the Gujarat Legislative Assembly
- Banaskantha district
