= Kalyan Chauhan =

Indian politician

Member of the Gujarat Legislative Assembly
- In office 2009–2012
- Preceded by: Jagdish Thakor
- Succeeded by: Kaminiba Rathod
- Constituency: Dahegam

Personal details
- Party: Bhartiya Janata Party

Kalyan Chauhan is a former member of the Gujarat Legislative Assembly from the Dahegam constituency.
