= Dhandhuka =

- Town
- Location in Gujarat, India Dhandhuka (India)
- Coordinates: 22°22′53″N 71°58′46″E
- Country: India
- State: Gujarat
- District: Ahmedabad

Government
  - Type: Municipality
  - Body: Dhandhuka Municipality
- Elevation: 24 m (79 ft)

Population (2001)
  - Total: 30,000
- Demonym: Kolis

Languages
  - Official: Gujarati, Hindi
- Time zone: UTC+5:30 (IST)
- Postal code: 382460
- Vehicle registration: GJ
- Website: gujaratindia.com

Dhandhuka is a town and a municipality in the Ahmedabad district in the state of Gujarat, India. Moreover, it is a part of the Bhal region.

== History ==
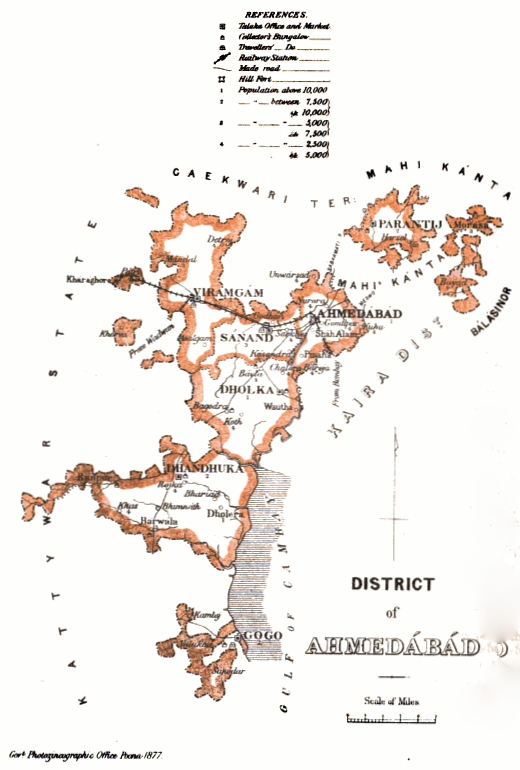
Dhandhuka in the map of Ahmedabad district under Bombay Presidency, British India 1877

In the twelfth century, Dhandhuka became famous as the birthplace of the great Jain teacher Hemchandra and in his honor, Chaulukya king Kumarapala (1143–1174) raised a temple over his birthplace. Under the Muslims and Marathas, Dhandhuka kept its position as a country town, its fortune is almost always linked with the fortune of Dholka. Along with Dholka, it was ceded to the British in 1802.

Chudasama Rajputs of Dhandhuka were the descendants of the ancient and princely line of Junagadh. A younger son of one of the Ra of Sorath, named Bhimji, is said to have received, as his patrimony, four "chorashees," or districts, each containing eighty-four villages; one of which, the district of Dhandhuka, was inherited by his son, Raysalji. From Merjee, the ' fourth son of Raysalji, descended the Chudasama grassia Sursangji.

== Geography ==
Dhandhuka is located at 22.37°N 71.98°E. It has an average elevation of 24 metres (78 feet). The city is 105 km from District center Ahmedabad, on state highway No 1. to Bhavnagar. Bhavnagar is 95 km from Dhandhuka town.

== Demographics ==
As of 2001 India census, Dhandhuka had a population of 29,555. Males constitute 52% of the population and females 48%. Dhandhuka has an average literacy rate of 66%, higher than the national average of 59.5%: male literacy is 75% and, female literacy is 57%. In Dhandhuka, 13% of the population is under 6 years of age.

The great Jain saint Acharya Shri Hemchandracharya (famous as Kalikal Sarvagya) born in 1088 A.D. into the Modha Vanik (merchant) caste, in the town of Dhandhuka. Pujya Shree Punit Maharaj (19 May 1908 – 27 July 1962) is also from Dhandhuka. The city has a population of more than 50,000 and a literacy rate of 66% (compared to the Indian national average of 59.5%). The town has an Arts and Commerce College and Three High Schools. The popular professions in the city include working for the automobile dealership, telecommunication dealership, insurance companies and agriculture. RMS Hospital, one of Gujarat's biggest hospitals, opened in 2007, receiving its funding in large part from some local donors and NRIs (Non-resident Indian). Common plants grown include cotton and wheat. There is a small industrial estate in the city known as G.I.D.C. (Gujarat Industrial Development Corporation), few entrepreneurs have established their small scale industries here.

== See also ==
- Dhandhuka (Vidhan Sabha constituency)
- Dhandhuka (Lok Sabha constituency)
- Dhandhuka (tehsil)
- Sonang Mer
- Rojid
