= Patan Lok Sabha constituency =

Lok Sabha constituency in Gujarat

Coordinates: 23.9°N 72.1°E

Patan
- Lok Sabha constituency
- Patan Lok Sabha Constituency પાટણ લોક સભા મતદાર વિભાગ

Constituency details
- Country: India
- Region: Western India
- State: Gujarat
- Assembly constituencies: Vadgam; Kankrej; Radhanpur; Chanasma; Patan; Sidhpur; Kheralu
- Established: 1957
- Total electors: 20,19,916 (2024)
- Reservation: None

Member of Parliament
- 18th Lok Sabha
- Incumbent Bharatsinhji Dabhi
- Party: Bhartiya Janata Party
- Elected year: 2024

Patan is a Lok Sabha constituency in Gujarat state, in western India.

== Vidhan Sabha segments ==
Presently, Patan Lok Sabha constituency comprises seven Vidhan Sabha (legislative assembly) segments. These are:

Constituency number	Name	Reserved for (SC/ST/None)	District	Party	2024 Lead
11	Vadgam	SC	Banaskantha	INC	INC
15	Kankrej	None	Banaskantha	INC	INC
16	Radhanpur	None	Patan	BJP	BJP
17	Chanasma	None	Patan	INC	BJP
18	Patan	None	Patan	INC	BJP
19	Sidhpur	None	Patan	BJP	INC
20	Kheralu	None	Mahesana	BJP	BJP

== Members of Lok Sabha ==
Year	Elected MP	Party
1957	Thakore Motisinh Bahadursinh	Indian National Congress
1962	Purushottamdas Ranchhoddas Patel	Indian National Congress
1967	D.R. Parmar	Swatantra Party
1971	Khemchanbhai Somabhai Chavda	Indian National Congress (O)
1977	Khemchanbhai Somabhai Chavda	Janata Party
1980	Parmar Hiralal Ranchhoddas	Indian National Congress (I)
1984	Vankar Punamchand Mithabhai	Indian National Congress
1989	Khemchanbhai Somabhai Chavda	Janata Dal
1991	Mahesh Kanodia	Bharatiya Janata Party
1996	Mahesh Kanodia	Bharatiya Janata Party
1998	Mahesh Kanodia	Bharatiya Janata Party
1999	Praveen Rashtrapal	Indian National Congress
2004	Mahesh Kanodia	Bharatiya Janata Party
2009	Jagdish Thakor	Indian National Congress
2014	Liladharbhai Vaghela	Bharatiya Janata Party
2019	Bharatsinhji Dabhi Thakor	Bharatiya Janata Party
2024	Bharatsinhji Dabhi Thakor	Bharatiya Janata Party

== Election results ==
=== 2024 ===
2024 Indian general election: Patan
Party	Candidate	Votes	%	±%
BJP	Bharatsinhji Dabhi Thakor	591,947	49.61	
INC	Chandanji Thakor	5,60,071	46.94	
SDPI	Ghagha Masihullah Abdul Hamid	2,312	0.2	
Majority		31,876		
Turnout		11,95,554	59.13	▼3.32
BJP hold		Swing		

=== 2019 ===
2019 Indian general elections: Patan
Party	Candidate	Votes	%	±%
BJP	Bharatsinhji Dabhi Thakor	633,368	56.24	+1.99
INC	Jagdish Thakor	4,39,489	39.02	−0.72
NOTA	None of the Above	14,327	1.27	+0.01
NCP	Chaudhari Kirtibhai Jeshangbhai	9,215	0.82	
Majority		1,93,879	17.22	+2.71
Turnout		11,28,417	62.45	+3.71
BJP hold		Swing		

=== General election 2014 ===
2014 Indian general elections: Patan
Party	Candidate	Votes	%	±%
BJP	Liladhar Vaghela	5,18,538	54.25	+12.35
INC	Bhavsinh Rathod	3,79,819	39.74	−5.08
BSP	Maganbhai Parmar	9,900	1.04	−0.65
NOTA	None of the Above	12,061	1.26	−−−
Majority		1,38,719	14.51	+11.59
Turnout		9,56,616	58.74	+14.07
BJP gain from INC		Swing		

=== General elections 2009 ===
2009 Indian general elections: Patan
Party	Candidate	Votes	%	±%
INC	Jagdish Thakor	2,83,772	44.82	
BJP	Bhavsinh Rathod	2,65,271	41.90	
MJP	Naranbhai Patel	18,554	2.93	
Majority		18,054	2.92	
Turnout		6,33,209	44.67	
INC gain from BJP		Swing		

=== Lok Sabha 2004 ===
2004 Indian general elections: Patan
Party	Candidate	Votes	%	±%
BJP	Mahesh Kanodia	2,73,970	50.90	
INC	Pravin Rastrapal	2,50,346	46.51	
BSP	Ishwarbhai Karbatiya	13,841	2.57	
Majority		23,624	4.39	
Turnout		5,38,194	47.50	
BJP gain from INC		Swing		

=== Lok Sabha 1957 ===
- Patan was in Bombay State in 1957.
- Thakore, Motisinh Bahadursinh (IND) : 131,802 votes
- Vijaykumar Madhavlal Trivedi (INC) : 90,458

== See also ==
- Patan district
- List of constituencies of the Lok Sabha
