= 2016 Una flogging incident =

Cow vigilante action in Una

Una flogging incident
- Part of cow vigilante violence in India
- Location: 20.82°N 71.03°E; Una, Gujarat
- Date: 11 July 2016; 10 years ago
- Attack type: Flogging
- Injuries: 4
- Motive: Cow protection

In July 2016, seven members of a Dalit family were assaulted by a group of people on the pretext of cow protection in Una in Gujarat, India. The video of the incident was circulated on the social media resulting in statewide protests in following months. Forty-three people including four Gujarat Police officers were arrested and the case is under trial since August 2018.

== Background ==
On 11 July 2016, the seven members of a Dalit family were skinning the carcasses of a dead cow in Mota Samadhiyala village near Una in Gir Somnath district of Gujarat. They had bought the carcass from Bediya village. They were approached by men in two cars who claimed to be a member of a "cow protection group" and accused them of killing cows. The Dalits tried to convince them that they were skinning dead cows. However, the unconvinced gau rakshaks tied the Dalits to the car and beat them with sticks, iron pipes and a knife. Four of them were brought to Una town in the car, stripped and assaulted again in public. When police arrived, the attackers fled in their car. The assault was recorded on video and circulated on social media. The Dalits were moved to hospital in Una and later to Rajkot civil hospital on 14 July.

== Aftermath ==
=== Protests ===
The videos of thrashing went viral on internet and sparked the protests across the state. On 12 July 2016 a huge protest rally was at first organized in Chandkheda area in Ahmedabad by various Dalit leaders in which more than 2,000 Dalits attended and blocked the state highway. On 13 July 2016, hundreds of Dalits hold protest rally against the incident and later occupied Trikon Baug, the main square in Una for an hour. On 21 July, the issue was discussed in Rajya Sabha, the upper house of Parliament. The protests spread across Saurashtra region. Twelve Dalit youth attempted suicide in protest across the region and one of them died. Twelve people including seven police personnel were injured in the protest and one of them died. Bystanders who attempted to interfere were also beaten.

Jignesh Mevani, a Dalit leader, led the protest march called Dalit Asmita Yatra, organised under Rashtriya Dalit Adhikar Manch from Ahmedabad to Una which culminated on 15 August 2016 which was attended by some 20,000 Dalits, including women, who took a pledge to give up their traditional jobs of removing cow carcasses. He demanded the land for upliftment of Dalits. In August 2016, 10 Dalits were injured and vehicles were torched when a mob attacked them returning from Una after attending a flag-hoisting ceremony to mark the end their 10-day Azadi Kooch (freedom march). The government denied the incident.

The government had filed 74 cases against the Dalit protesters who damage private and government property.

=== Other incident ===
On 25 April 2018 two of the victims of the Una incident were again attacked by one of the accused who was out on bail. They were returning from shopping in Una in preparation for their conversion to Buddhism.

== Arrests ==
The Gujarat Crime Investigation Department (CID) arrested 43 people in September 2016 including two minors and four police officers. Later, 35 of them were released on bail and one arrested police officer died of jaundice in September 2017. The prime accused was released on bail on the condition of not entering the limits of Una. Thirty-four of them were charged for attempt to murder, robbery, kidnapping, assault to dishonour person, wrongful confinement, rioting, hurting by weapon and criminal conspiracy. They were also charged for atrocities and recording the video of the incident. The charge sheet was filed in December 2016.

The trial started in August 2018.

== Government response ==
Gujarat Chief Minister Anandiben Patel visited Mota Samadhiyala and promised that the victims would be given Below Poverty Line cards, housing plots, five-acre agricultural land and government jobs. However, in 2018, the BJP government told the Gujarat Legislative Assembly that there was no record of the promises. Jignesh Mevani, who had asked the question in the Assembly, accused the state government of reneging on its promise.

The victims had protested with hunger strike against the government and sought mercy killing for not fulfilling the promise of 5 acres land, BPL card, each one government job, housing plot and Subsidy for house built.

== In popular culture ==
The 2019 Hindi film Article 15 portrayed the flogging incident with a modified story.
