= Bharatsinhji Dabhi =

Indian politician

Member of Parliament, Lok Sabha
- Incumbent
- Assumed office 23 May 2019
- Preceded by: Liladhar Vaghela
- Constituency: Patan

MLA of Gujarat Legislative Assembly
- In office 2007–2019
- Constituency: Kheralu

Personal details
- Born: 18 March 1955 (age 71) Dabhoda, Bombay State, India
- Party: Bharatiya Janata Party
- Spouse: Pravinaba
- Children: 3
- Parent: Shankarji Dabhi
- Education: B.A.
- Occupation: Farmers
- Profession: Politicians

Bharatsinhji Dabhi is a Member of Legislative assembly from Kheralu constituency in Gujarat for its 12th, 13th and 14th legislative assembly.

He was elected to the Lok Sabha, lower house of the Parliament of India from Patan, Gujarat in the 2019 and 2024 general elections as member of the Bharatiya Janata Party.
