= Sidhpur Assembly constituency =

Legislative Assembly constituency in Gujarat State, India

Coordinates: 23.92°N 72.37°E

Sidhpur
- Constituency No. 19 for the Gujarat Legislative Assembly

Constituency details
- Country: India
- Region: Western India
- State: Gujarat
- District: Patan
- Lok Sabha constituency: Patan
- Established: 2007
- Total electors: 271,304
- Reservation: None

Member of Legislative Assembly
- 15th Gujarat Legislative Assembly
- Incumbent Balvantsinh Chandansinh Rajput
- Party: Bharatiya Janata Party
- Elected year: 2022

Sidhpur is one of the 182 Legislative Assembly constituencies of Gujarat state in India. It is part of Patan district. It is numbered as 19-Sidhpur.

== List of segments ==
This assembly seat represents the following segments,

1. Sidhpur Taluka
2. Patan Taluka (Part) Villages – Ajuja, Muna, Khareda, Untvada, Amarpura, Vahana, Bhatsan, Koita, Raviyana, Khodana, Katrasamal, Mesar, Haidarpura, Delvada, Ganeshpura, Abalouva, Jangral, Vasni, Jakha, Lakshmipura, Endla, Kanosan, Morpa, Vagdod, Vachhalva, Lakhdap, Bhilvan, Renchavi, Vadhi, Charup, Vadu, Siyol, Vamaiya, Kimbuva, Kotavad, Sanodarda.

== Members of Legislative Assembly ==
| Year | Member | Party |
|---|---|---|
| 1998 | Jay Narayan Vyas | Bharatiya Janata Party |
| 2002 | Balvantsinh Rajput | Indian National Congress |
| 2007 | Jay Narayan Vyas | Bharatiya Janata Party |
| 2012 | Balvantsinh Chandansinh Rajput | Indian National Congress |
| 2017 | Chandanji Talaji Thakor | Indian National Congress |
| 2022 | Balvantsinh Chandansinh Rajput | Bharatiya Janata Party |

== Election results ==
=== 2022 ===
Gujarat Assembly election, 2022: Sidhpur Assembly constituency
| Party | Candidate | Votes | % | ±% |
|---|---|---|---|---|
| BJP | Balvantsinh Chandansinh Rajput | 91,187 | 48.19 | |
| INC | Chandanji Talaji Thakor | 88,373 | 46.7 | |
| BSP | Govindbhai Rathod | 2,040 | 1.08 | |
| AAP | Rajput Mahendrasinh Dalpatsinh | 2,082 | 1.1 | |
| NOTA | None of the above | 1,857 | 0.98 | |
| Majority | | | 1.49 | |
| Turnout | | | | |
| Registered electors | | 271,103 | | |

=== 2017 ===
Gujarat Legislative Assembly Election, 2017: Sidhpur
| Party | Candidate | Votes | % | ±% |
|---|---|---|---|---|
| INC | Chandanji Talaji Thakor | 88,268 | 52.24 | 10.23 |
| BJP | Jaynarayan Vyas | 71,008 | 42.03 | −10.21 |
| Majority | | 88,268 | 52.24 | +10.21 |
| Turnout | | | | |

=== 2012 ===
Gujarat Assembly Election, 2012
| Party | Candidate | Votes | % | ±% |
|---|---|---|---|---|
| INC | Balvantsinh Rajput | 87,518 | 54.07 | |
| BJP | Jay Narayan Vyas | 61,694 | 38.12 | |
| Majority | | 25,824 | 15.95 | |
| Turnout | | 161,860 | 77.42 | |
| INC gain from BJP | | Swing | | |
