= Dahegam Assembly constituency =

Legislative Assembly constituency in Gujarat State, India

Coordinates: 23.17°N 72.81°E

Dahegam
- Constituency No. 34 for the Gujarat Legislative Assembly

Constituency details
- Country: India
- Region: Western India
- State: Gujarat
- District: Gandhinagar
- Lok Sabha constituency: Ahmedabad East
- Established: 1962
- Total electors: 220,928
- Reservation: None

Member of Legislative Assembly
- 15th Gujarat Legislative Assembly
- Incumbent Chauhan Balrajsinh Kalyansinh
- Party: Bharatiya Janata Party
- Elected year: 2022

Dahegam is one of the 182 Legislative Assembly constituencies of Gujarat state in India. It is part of Gandhinagar district.

== List of segments ==
This assembly seat represents the following segments,

1. Dahegam Taluka

== Members of Legislative Assembly ==
Year	Member	Image	Party
1962	Vitthalbhai Amin		Indian National Congress
1967	M. C. Shah		Swatantra Party
1972	Ghanshyam Oza		Indian National Congress
1975	Gabhaji Thakor		Bharatiya Jana Sangh
1980	Khumansinh Rathod		Indian National Congress
1985	Gabhaji Thakor		Bharatiya Janata Party
1990	Vitthalbhai Shah		Bharatiya Janata Party
1995	Vitthalbhai Shah		Bharatiya Janata Party
1998	Gabhaji Thakor		Bharatiya Janata Party
2002	Jagdish Thakor		Indian National Congress
2007	Jagdish Thakor		Indian National Congress
2009 (Note: by-election)	Kalyan Chauhan		Bharatiya Janata Party
2012	Kaminiba Rathod		Indian National Congress
2017	Balrajsinh Chauhan		Bharatiya Janata Party
2022	Balrajsinh Chauhan		Bharatiya Janata Party

== Election results ==
=== 2022 ===
Gujarat Assembly Election, 2022
Party	Candidate	Votes	%	±%
BJP	Balrajsinh Chauhan	75,133	49.26	−1.62
INC	Vakhatsinh Chauhan	58,960	38.65	−6.67
AAP	Suhag Panchal	12,394	8.13	New
RRP	Ashokbhai Natubhai Rathod	891	0.58	New
Majority			11.99	
Turnout		152,534		
BJP hold		Swing		

=== 2017 ===
Gujarat Legislative Assembly Election, 2017: Dahegam
Party	Candidate	Votes	%	±%
BJP	Balrajsinh Chauhan	74,445	50.88	+5.17
INC	Kaminiba Bhupendrasinh Rathod	63,585	43.46	−4.04
Majority				
Turnout				
BJP gain from INC		Swing		

=== 2012 ===
Gujarat Legislative Assembly Election, 2012: Dahegam
Party	Candidate	Votes	%	±%
INC	Kaminiba Bhupendrasinh Rathod	61,043	47.50	
BJP	Rohitji Chanduji Thakor	58,746	45.71	
IND.	Kiritkumar Natvarlal Rawal	4,199	3.27	
IND.	Jeshangbhai Bijalbhai Rathod	1,899	1.48	
BSP	Harshadbhai Shantilal Rathod	1,282	1.00	
Majority		2,297	1.79	
Turnout		1,28,510	73.77	
INC hold		Swing		

== See also ==
- List of constituencies of the Gujarat Legislative Assembly
- Gandhinagar district
