= Sonang Mer =

Thakor Sonangji Mer
- Thakor
- Successor: Thakor Dhan Mer
- Born: Sangram Singhji Koli; Sindh, Pakistan
- Died: Dhandhuka, Gujarat, India
- Issue: Thakor Dhan Mer, Thakor Jaisinghji Khant, Thakor Patal Khant, Thakor Mer Rana and nine more
Names
- Thakor Shree Sonang Singhji Mer
- House: Bhati Dynasty
- Religion: Hindu Koli

Thakor Sonangji Mer or Thakur Sonangji Mair was chief of Kolis. He came from Sindh to Dhandhuka. His son Dhandhal Khant was founder of Dhandhuka. He conquered the Dhandhuka and founded Dhandhalpur.
