= Balvantsinh Rajput =

Indian politician

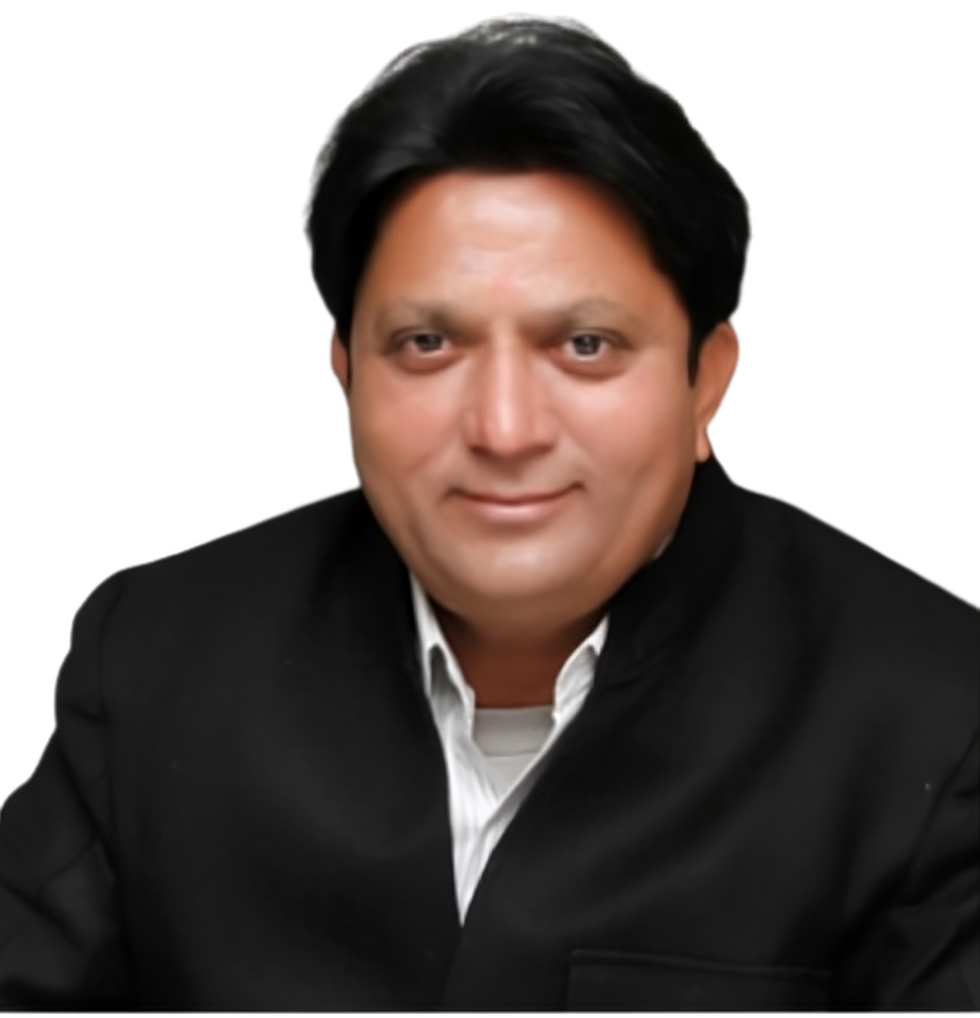

Cabinet Minister of Industries, Civil Aviation, Rural Development, Labour and Employment in Government of Gujarat
- Incumbent
- Assumed office 12 December 2022
- Constituency: Sidhpur

Member of Gujarat Legislative Assembly
- Incumbent
- Assumed office 2022
- Preceded by: Jay Narayan Vyas
- Constituency: Sidhpur
- In office December 2002 – December 2007
- In office December 2012 – 28 July 2017

Chairman of Gujarat Industrial Development Corporation (GIDC)
- In office 23 October 2017 – 2020

Personal details
- Born: 17 August 1962 (age 63) Patan, Gujarat, India
- Party: Bharatiya Janata Party
- Spouse: Bhikiba
- Children: 5
- Parent(s): Chandansinh Rajput (father); Hansaba (mother)
- Occupation: Politician
- Website: www.balwantsinhrajput.org

Balvantsinh Rajput is an Indian politician businessman and cabinet minister of Industries, Civil Aviation, Rural Development, Labour and Employment in the Government of Gujarat. He joined the Bharatiya Janata Party in 2017 after leaving Indian National Congress before the Rajya Sabha election.

== Career ==
During the Gujarat Assembly election of 2012 Rajput who belonged to the Indian National Congress party declared assets worth 2680 million rupees ($41 million). In the election, he defeated Jay Narayan Vyas of the Bharatiya Janata Party from the Sidhpur seat.

On 28 July 2017, Rajput along with two other Congress legislators resigned from the assembly and joined the Bharatiya Janata Party in the presence of party president Amit Shah ahead of the Rajya Sabha election (Election to Upper House of Indian Parliament). It was announced that he was nominated by his new party as a candidate from the state's third seat. He was congratulated by chief minister Vijay Rupani.
