= Gabhaji Thakor =

Indian politician

Gabhaji Mangaji Thakor
- Constituency: Kapadvanj

Personal details
- Born: 15 June 1933 Amdavad (Gujarat)
- Died: 2 January 2021 (aged 87)
- Party: Indian National Congress
- Spouse: Shantaben Thakor (m.1950)
- Children: Three sons, Two daughters
- Education: Matriculation
- Profession: Agriculturist

Gabhaji Mangaji Thakor (koli) was an Indian politician.

He served as a member of the Lok Sabha for Kapadvanj from 1989 to 1996.

He was also served as a member of the Gujarat Legislative Assembly representing Dehgam.
