= Reshma Thomas =

Indian artist

Reshma Elizabeth Thomas is a social worker, gender auditor, and a self-taught artist in India.

She presented a paper about the historical and present influences on the transgender community at a national conference on transgender inequality at Trivandrum, Kerala.

== Exhibitions ==
- A is for ART at Press Club Trivandrum, July 2015 - an art exhibition in support of Queer Pride Kerala
- Mind Network, an exhibition of art inspired by those afflicted by depression in support on World Mental Health Day), October 2015
- Identity, Lalitha Kala Akademi - organised by Department of Social Justice, Government of Kerala, December 2016
- Imprints David Hall, Kochi, 2017
- The Secret Metamorphosis, Trivandrum, 2018
- The Unheard Voices, Trivandrum, 2019
