= Dyachevo =

Dyachevo Дьячево
- Village
- Location within Ivanovo Oblast Location within Russia
- Coordinates: 57°24′N 42°28′E
- Country: Russia
- Region: Ivanovo Oblast
- District: Kineshemsky District
- Time zone: UTC+3:00

Dyachevo (Russian: Дьячево) is a rural locality (a village) in Kineshemsky District, Ivanovo Oblast, Russia. Population: 1,407 (2010 census);

== Geography ==
This rural locality is located 21 kilometres (13 mi) from Kineshma (the district's administrative centre), 102 kilometres (63 mi) from Ivanovo (capital of Ivanovo Oblast) and 344 kilometres (214 mi) from Moscow. Mukhortovo is the nearest rural locality.
