= Reshma Bhandari =

Nepalese volleyball player (born 1994)

Personal information
- Nationality: Nepalese
- Born: 3 January 1994 (age 32); Kathmandu, Nepal
- Hometown: Kathmandu
- Education: Intensive International College

Volleyball information
- Current club: APF Club

Reshma Bhandari (born 3 January 1994) is a National Volleyball player of Nepal. She plays from Armed Police Force Nepal's APF Club of 2013 (2070 in Nepali calendar).

== Early life ==
She was born on 3 January 1994 and is from Kathmandu, Nepal. She studied at Intensive International College.
