= Liladhar Vaghela =

Indian politician (1935–2020)

Member of the India Parliament for Patan
- In office 16 May 2014 – 23 May 2019
- Preceded by: Jagdish Thakor
- Succeeded by: Bharatsinhji Dabhi
- Constituency: Patan

Personal details
- Born: Liladharbhai Khodaji Vaghela; 17 February 1935 Patan, Bombay Presidency, British India
- Died: 17 September 2020 (aged 85) Gandhinagar, Gujarat, India
- Party: Bharatiya Janata Party
- Other political affiliations: Janata Dal; Indian National Congress
- Children: 5
- Education: Gujarat Vidyapith
- Occupation: Farmer, Teacher
- As of 12 December, 2016

Liladharbhai Khodaji Vaghela (17 February 1935 – 17 September 2020) was a Member of Parliament or Lok Sabha from Patan constituency in Gujarat, India.

== Personal ==
Liladharbhai Khodaji Vaghela was born in Patan. He started his career in agriculture, social work and journalism. He was the founder editor of Banas Sandesh weekly for last 25 years. On 31 August 2018, he was attacked by a stray cow outside his residence in Gandhinagar. He suffered two fractured ribs in the attack.

== Political career ==
Liladhar Vaghela was in the Congress party in the past, and he was a minister in late Chimanbhai Patel ministry. He came to limelight when he contested the Lok Sabha election against then heavyweight Congress leader Shankersinh Vaghela in 2004. Though he was from north Gujarat, he was chosen by Modi to contest the election of central Gujarat's Kapadvanj against locally experienced candidate Shankarsinh, because he was from Thakor community. Vaghela lost the election. He found his place in Modi ministry as minister of state after winning the Patan Constituency.

Assembly Career:

Member:

1. Fifth Gujarat Legislative Assembly, 1975–80.
2. Seventh Gujarat Legislative Assembly, 1985–90.
3. Eighth Gujarat Legislative Assembly, 1990–95.
4. Tenth Gujarat Legislative Assembly, 1998–2002.
5. Twelfth Gujarat Legislative Assembly, 2007–2012.
6. Thirteenth Gujarat Legislative Assembly, 2012–2017.

Whip:

1. Gujarat Legislature Janata Dal, 1985–90.

Minister:

1. Minister for Panchayats and Rural Housing in Govt. of Gujarat 1990–95.
2. Minister of State for Consumer affairs, including Weight and Measurement (Independent Charge).
3. Minister of Rural Development, 1999–2001.
4. Minister of Prison (Independent Charge), 2001–2002.
5. Minister of Agriculture, 2001–2002.
6. Minister of State for Labour and Employment, 2011–2012.
7. Minister of State for AH, Fisheries, Cow Breeding, SEBC Welfare, 2012–2013, Minister of State for SEBC Welfare 2013–2017.

Activities: President:

1. Banaskantha District Economically Backward Society Service Union since 1985,
2. Banaskantha District Jan Morcho,
3. Mid-Day Meal Evaluation Committee, Govt. of Gujarat,
4. Banaskantha District Panchayat since 1984,
5. Banaskantha District Thakor Samaj, 1972–91,
6. Banaskantha Youth Congress 1972–75,
7. Banaskantha District Janata Dal, 1989–90.

Vice President:

1. Gujarat Pradesh: Jan Morcho since 1985
2. Banaskantha District: Congress Committee from 1977–78 to 1982–83.

Convenor:

1. Gujarat Vikasati Jati Vikas Mandal since 1985,
2. Gujarat "Aavidal" Vikas Parishad Since 1996.

Other: Organization-

1. District Organiser and District Leader, Banaskantha District Congress Seva Dal, 1955–64.
2. Chairman, Banaskantha District Panchayat, Education Committee, 1981–83.

Teacher:

- He was the Rector and a Teacher at Lokniketan Organisation for Five Years.
- He was a teacher in the Secondary High School run by Vividhlakshi Vidyamandir.

== Assets and Liabilities ==
Liladhar Vaghela, at the time of 2012 Assembly Election, had Movable Assets worth Rs 27,56,580 and Immovable Assets worth Rs 1,12,35,850 against outstanding Debt of Rs 1,55,651.

He spent Rs. 9,00,000 on his campaign and got grant of Rs. 5,00,000 from the Party.
