= Reshma of Kashmir =

Singer and transgender activist from Kashmir

Reshma (1950 - November 2022), popularly known as Reshma of Kashmir, was a transgender singer and activist from Srinagar, Kashmir. She attained celebrity status and videos of her singing have garnered thousands of views on social media.

== Early life ==
Reshma was born in Srinagar. She had two sisters and six brothers. At age 11 she realised her talent and love for singing and dancing. As a child, she was bullied for her feminine clothing choices and style of speaking. She dropped out of school after fifth standard as a result, and began working as a tailor under the supervision of her uncle.

== Career ==
At the age of 22, Reshma was asked to sing by a tailoring client after she came by their home in Lal Bazar to drop off some clothes. The head of the client's family gave her a chit with the word "reshma" on it, which Reshma subsequently adopted as her name. Her mother reacted negatively when Reshma told her of the interaction, so she decided not to pursue singing.

She changed her mind in 2001, after she began caring for her brother's four children after he died in an accident. Working as a wedding singer became a viable option for income in order to support her family.

== Activism ==
Reshma was at the forefront of transgender community's struggle for dignity in Kashmir. In 2011, Reshma, along with other transgender activists, approached the state's social welfare department to initiate an 'Intervention Plan', aimed at rehabilitating transgender persons in the Valley.

== In media ==
Reshma was included in a 2022 documentary on transgender Kashmiri people, entitled Trans Kashmir. In 2023, she was profiled by writer-activist Aditya Tiwari in the anthology Over the Rainbow: India’s Queer Heroes, published by Juggernaut, alongside figures such as Madhu Kinnar, Rituparno Ghosh, Saleem Kidwai, and Laxmi Narayan Tripathi.

== Death ==
Reshma died from cancer in November 2022 at the age of 70, leaving behind a lasting legacy through her songs and tireless work for the transgender community in India-administered Kashmir.
