= Rashtriya Dalit Adhikar Manch =

Indian Non-governmental Organisation

- Abbreviation: RDAM
- Nickname: Dalit Adhikar Manch
- Named after: Dalit Rights Platform
- Formation: July 2016
- Founder: Jignesh Mevani
- Founded at: Vadgam, Gujarat
- Type: Non-governmental Organisation
- Legal status: Active
- Headquarters: Ahmedabad, Gujarat
- Location: Surat, India
- Region served: Gujarat
- President: Jignesh Mevani

Rashtriya Dalit Adhikar Manch is an Indian non-governmental organization founded by former journalist, politician and lawyer Jignesh Mevani in July 2016 for Dalits in Gujarat.

Mevani fought 2017 Gujarat Elections as an independent. Mevani won the election.
