= Rojid =

- village
- Location in Gujarat, India Rojid (India)
- Coordinates: 22.19°N 71.89°E
- Country: India
- State: Gujarat
- District: Ahmedabad

Languages
  - Official: Gujarati, Hindi
- Time zone: UTC+5:30 (IST)
- PIN: 382450
- Vehicle registration: GJ-
- Coastline: 0 kilometres (0 mi)
- Website: gujaratindia.com

Rashid is a village in Barwala Taluka, Gujara, India. The total geographical area of village is 2235.97 hectares.
