= Manilal Vaghela =

Indian politician

Former Member of Legislative assembly of Gujarat Legislative Assembly
- In office 2012–2017
- Succeeded by: Jignesh Mevani
- Constituency: Vadgam

Personal details
- Party: Indian National Congress (until 2021); Bhartiya Janata Party (2022–present)

Manilal Jethabhai Vaghela is an Indian politician from Gujarat.

== Political career ==
Vaghela was elected as a member of the Gujarat Legislative Assembly from Vadgam in 2012 as a candidate of the Indian National Congress (INC). When the INC supported independent candidate Jignesh Mevani from Vadgam in 2017 Gujarat Legislative Assembly election, he was moved to contest as an INC candidate from Idar, where he was defeated. He resigned from INC in November 2021 and joined the Bharatiya Janata Party (BJP) in April 2022. He contested 2022 Gujarat Legislative Assembly election from Vadgam as a BJP candidate but was defeated by his nearest rival, and INC candidate Jignesh Mevani.
