= Reshma Patel =

- Reshma Patel
- Born: Upleta, Gujarat, India
- Citizenship: India
- Education: Bahauddin College, Junagadh, Saurashtra, Gujarat
- Known for: Social Activist fighting for the rights of women, children, youths, farmers and victims of injustice and inequality.
- Political party: Aam Aadmi party

Reshma Patel is an Indian Politician and social activist fighting for the rights of women, children, youths, farmers and victims of injustice and inequality. she is an aam aadmi party leader. She was also associated with NCP. Former chief minister and NCP Gujarat president Sankarsih bapu Vaghela entrusted her as the General Secretary of Gujarat state NCP Nationalist Congress Party.

== Family life ==
Reshma married with Chintan Sojitra who is business person

== Social and political activism ==
She was also a member of Bharatiya Janata Party before joining Nationalist Congress Party. She has actively participated and contributed in well known Patidar reservation agitation after police firing had killed innocent patidars and arrested Hardik Patel. She sat on an indefinite hunger strike for 21 days for the release of community members lodged in jail by the state.

She filed public interest litigation for the use of VVPAT in EVM machines which was dismissed by the Gujarat High Court. She has challenged the said order before the Supreme Court of India which is pending for the adjudication wherein the Supreme Court of India has issued notices to the Central Government, State Government, Election Commission of India, Election Commission of Gujarat and the companies which manufacture EVMs.

As she participated in Mehsana "Jail Bharo Aandolan" which turned violent, she was lodged in Sabarmati Central Jail, Ahmedabad and was released after more than 30 days with the strict and stringent conditions.

In July 2017, in the "Azaddi kooch" held to protest the dalit atrocities in Gujarat, the police detained her, Kanhaiya Kumar and other activists.

But after that she recently changed her political view, resigned from BJP and joined Nationalist Congress Party and contested in Manavadar (Vidhan Sabha constituency) by-election in March 2019.
