= Martin Macwan =

Indian human rights activist (born 1959)

Martin Macwan (born c. 1959) is a Dalit human rights activist in Gujarat, India.

== Life and career ==
He is one of 11 children. As a student, he watched assaults and killings of fellow Dalits, which motivated him to become an activist for Dalit rights.

He barely escaped death in 1986 when colleagues were murdered during a land rights campaign. Since suffering this tragedy, Macwan has fought to bring the killers, a group of feudal Darbars, to justice. He founded the Navsarjan Trust in 1989 to promote the rights of Dalits, addressing issues of land rights, minimum wages, and women’s rights. He served as the organization's director until 2004, and he has also served as a convener of the National Campaign on Dalit Human Rights.

Macwan has been trying to gain more exposure to the plight of Dalits, and has argued that the caste system violates the Universal Declaration of Human Rights, in hopes of gaining international attention to the discrimination against the untouchable class. He argues that the caste system cannot be considered simply a domestic matter: "We say that India did support the U.S. civil rights movement in the 1960s, and also the anti-apartheid struggle in South Africa ... In this era of the globalization of markets and of human rights, no country can claim that it's a domestic matter. It's a universal concern."

== Legacy and awards ==
The U.S.-based Robert F. Kennedy Center for Justice and Human Rights presented him its Robert F. Kennedy Human Rights Award in 2000. In the same year, Human Rights Watch named him one of the year's five "outstanding human rights defenders".

He was also engaged in the bringing together of the Dalit Mithila artists of the godana tradition from Bihar. The godana or tattoo style within the Mithila paintings is practiced by the women of the Dusadh caste of the MIthila region. As Sindalli Thakur says "Macwan's plan was to introduce these painters to the dalit discourse, make them acquainted with icons like Phule and Ambedkar, and inspire them to paint these icons and themes related to caste discrimination. Some of the themes that these artists depicted at Macwan's organization include aspects of B. R. Ambedkar and Phule's life histories, such as the Mahad Satyagraha of 1927: caste discrimination in schools and in the access to public resources like village wells."
